= List of TurboGrafx-16 games =

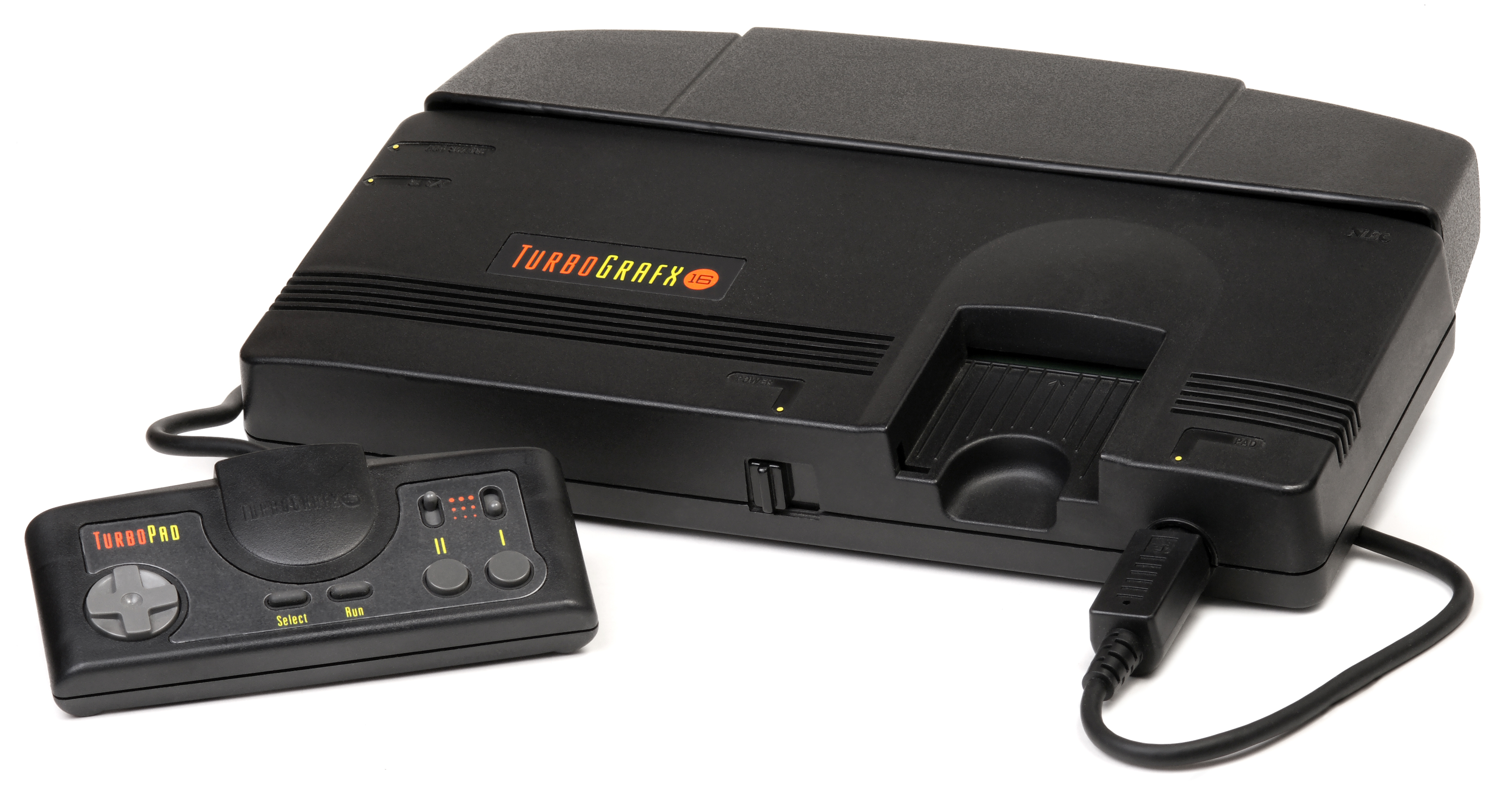
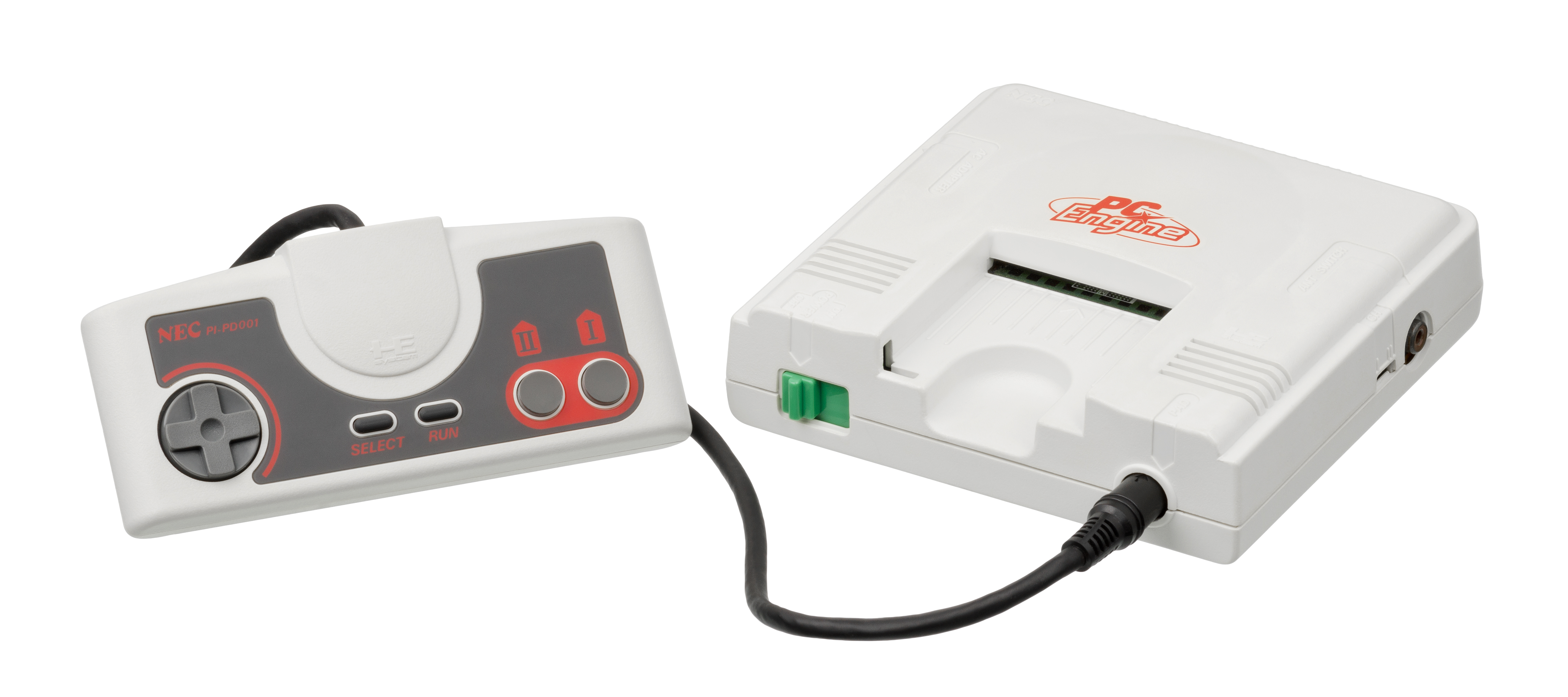
The North American TurboGrafx-16 (top) and Japanese PC Engine (bottom)

This is a list of games released for NEC's PC Engine/TurboGrafx-16 home video game console. It covers 672 commercial releases spanning the system's launch on October 10, 1987, until June 3, 1999. It was released in Japan as the PC Engine in 1987 and North America as the TurboGrafx-16 in 1989.

== Classification ==
Listed here are 672 games released commercially for the console between its launch on October 10, 1987, until June 3, 1999. This includes the TurboGrafx-16 in North America and the PC Engine in Japan. About 121 of those games are localized from the PC Engine library, 18 of those games are exclusive to the U.S. market, and the remainder are exclusive to Japan.

TurboGrafx-16 and PC Engine games were released in two types of storage formats, HuCards (also known as TurboChips) and CD-ROMs, with varying level of compatibility depending on the hardware configurations and options available. Specifically, there are two types of HuCard formats (the standard HuCards that comprised the majority of the PC Engine's library and a few games that are playable only on the PC Engine SuperGrafx) and three types of CD-ROM formats (CD-ROM², Super CD-ROM², and Arcade CD-ROM², each requiring the console to be equipped with a CD drive and the corresponding System Card if needed). There were also dual-compatible games that were designed to run in an older hardware specifications, but are programmed to take advantage of a newer one (such as reduced loading times). Out of the 389 games that were released on CD-ROM² formats, only 45 were released in North America. 213 games supported multiplayer options through the Turbotap, yet only 51 of these games were released in North America.

PC Engine/TurboGrafx-16 format guide
| Format | Description |
|---|---|
| HuCard | Standard HuCards designed to run on any PC Engine or TurboGrafx-16 console. |
| SuperGrafx | HuCard games designed solely for the PC Engine SuperGrafx console. |
| CD-ROM² | Discs designed for any version of the CD-ROM² System add-on. |
| Super CD-ROM² | Discs designed for the Super CD-ROM² System or CD-ROM² System with Super System Card. |
| Arcade CD-ROM² | Discs designed for the Super CD-ROM² System with Arcade Card Duo or CD-ROM² System with Arcade Card Pro. |

== List of games ==
| Main title | Distributor | Release date | | Format |
| Main title | Distributor | Japan | North America | Format |
|---|---|---|---|---|
| 1552: Tenka Tairan | ASK Kodansha | July 16, 1993 | Unreleased | Super CD-ROM² |
| 1941: Counter Attack | Hudson Soft | August 22, 1991 | Unreleased | SuperGrafx |
| 1943 Kai | Naxat Soft | March 22, 1991 | Unreleased | HuCard |
| 21 Emon: Mezase! Hotel Ō | NEC Home Electronics | December 16, 1994 | Unreleased | HuCard |
| Sazan Eyes: Sanjiyan Henjō | NEC Home Electronics | July 8, 1994 | Unreleased | Arcade CD-ROM² |
| A-Ressha de Ikō III | Artdink | June 11, 1993 | Unreleased | Super CD-ROM² |
| Addams Family, The | NEC | Unreleased | November 1991 | CD-ROM² |
| Advanced V.G. | TGL | July 22, 1994 | Unreleased | Super CD-ROM² |
| Adventure Quiz: Capcom World / Hatena no Daibōken | Hudson Soft | June 12, 1992 | Unreleased | Super CD-ROM² |
| Aero Blasters | NEC (US); Hudson Soft (JP) | November 2, 1990 | January 1991 | HuCard |
| After Burner II | NEC Avenue | September 28, 1990 | Unreleased | HuCard |
| Ai Cho Aniki | Masaya | February 24, 1995 | Unreleased | Super CD-ROM² |
| Air Zonk •PC Denjin^{JP} | TTI (US); Hudson Soft (JP) | November 20, 1992 | October 1992 | HuCard |
| Akiyama Jin no Sūgaku Mystery | NHK | December 10, 1994 | Unreleased | Super CD-ROM² |
| Aldynes | Hudson Soft | February 22, 1991 | Unreleased | SuperGrafx |
| Alien Crush | NEC (US); Naxat Soft (JP) | September 14, 1988 | August 29, 1989 | HuCard |
| Alshark | Victor Entertainment | August 26, 1994 | Unreleased | Super CD-ROM² |
| Alzadick | Naxat Soft | July 17, 1992 | Unreleased | CD-ROM² |
| Ane-san | NEC Avenue | February 24, 1995 | Unreleased | Super CD-ROM² |
| Aoi Blink | Hudson Soft | April 27, 1990 | Unreleased | HuCard |
| Aoki Ōkami to Shiroki Mejika: Genchō Hishi | Koei | September 30, 1993 | Unreleased | Super CD-ROM² |
| Appare! Gateball | Hudson Soft | December 22, 1988 | Unreleased | HuCard |
| Asuka 120% Maxima BURNING Fest. | NEC Avenue | July 28, 1995 | Unreleased | Super CD-ROM² |
| The Atlas | Artdink | March 4, 1994 | Unreleased | Super CD-ROM² |
| Atomic Robo-Kid Special | UPL | January 19, 1990 | Unreleased | HuCard |
| Aurora Quest: Otaku no Seiza in Another World | Pack-In-Video | December 10, 1993 | Unreleased | Super CD-ROM² |
| Auto Crusher Palladium | Pack-In-Video | February 25, 1994 | Unreleased | Super CD-ROM² |
| Avenger | Telenet Japan | December 7, 1990 | Unreleased | CD-ROM² |
| Andre Panza Kick Boxing •The Kick Boxing^{JP} | NEC (US); Micro World (JP) | July 31, 1992 | December 1991 | HuCard^{US} Super CD-ROM²^{JP} |
| Babel | Telenet Japan | March 27, 1992 | Unreleased | Super CD-ROM² |
| Baby Jo the Superhero | Micro World | August 28, 1992 | Unreleased | Super CD-ROM² |
| Bakuchō Yoshimoto Shinkigeki | Hudson Soft | January 3, 1994 | Unreleased | Super CD-ROM² |
| Bakuden: Unbalanced Zone | Sony Music Entertainment | April 22, 1994 | Unreleased | Super CD-ROM² |
| Ballistix | NEC (US); Coconuts Japan (JP) | December 13, 1991 | May 1992 | HuCard |
| Bari Bari Densetsu | Taito | November 29, 1989 | Unreleased | HuCard |
| Barunba | Namco | April 27, 1990 | Unreleased | HuCard |
| Basted | NEC Avenue | October 21, 1994 | Unreleased | Super CD-ROM² |
| Batman | Sunsoft | October 12, 1990 | Unreleased | HuCard |
| Battle Ace | Hudson Soft | November 30, 1989 | Unreleased | SuperGrafx |
| Battle Field '94 in Tokyo Dome | Fujicom | November 25, 1994 | Unreleased | Arcade CD-ROM² |
| Battle Lode Runner | Hudson Soft | February 10, 1993 | Unreleased | HuCard |
| Battle Royale | NEC | Unreleased | October 1990 | HuCard |
| Bazar dé Gozarre no Game de Gozāru | NEC Home Electronics | July 25, 1996 | Unreleased | Super CD-ROM² |
| Benkei Gaiden | Sunsoft | December 22, 1989 | Unreleased | HuCard |
| Beyond Shadowgate | TTI | Unreleased | December 1993 | Super CD-ROM² |
| Bikkuriman Daijikai | Hudson Soft | December 23, 1988 | Unreleased | CD-ROM² |
| Bikkuriman World | Hudson Soft | October 30, 1987 | Unreleased | HuCard |
| Bishōjo Senshi Sailor Moon | Banpresto | August 5, 1994 | Unreleased | Super CD-ROM² |
| Bishōjo Senshi Sailor Moon Collection | Banpresto | November 25, 1994 | Unreleased | Super CD-ROM² |
| Black Hole Assault | Micronet | July 23, 1993 | Unreleased | Super CD-ROM² |
| Blazing Lazers •Gunhed^{JP} | NEC (US); Hudson Soft (JP) | July 7, 1989 | November 1989 | HuCard |
| Blood Gear | Hudson Soft | October 28, 1994 | Unreleased | Super CD-ROM² |
| Bloody Wolf •Narazumono Sentō Butai Bloody Wolf^{JP} | NEC (US); Data East (JP) | September 1, 1989 | June 1990 | HuCard |
| Bomberman | NEC (US); Hudson Soft (JP) | December 7, 1990 | April 1991 | HuCard |
| Bomberman '93 | TTI (US); Hudson Soft (JP) | December 11, 1992 | March 1993 | HuCard |
| Bomberman '94 | Hudson Soft | December 10, 1993 | Unreleased | HuCard |
| Bonanza Bros. | NEC Avenue | July 31, 1992 | Unreleased | Super CD-ROM² |
| Bonk's Adventure •PC Genjin^{JP} | NEC (US); Hudson Soft (JP) | December 15, 1989 | April 1990 | HuCard |
| Bonk's Revenge •PC Genjin 2^{JP} | NEC (US); Hudson Soft (JP) | July 19, 1991 | July 1991 | HuCard |
| Bonk 3: Bonk's Big Adventure •PC Genjin 3^{JP} | TTI (US); Hudson Soft (JP) | April 2, 1993 | June 1993 | HuCard |
| Bonk 3: Bonk's Big Adventure (CD) | TTI | Unreleased | December 1994 | Super CD-ROM² |
| Bōken Danshaku Don: The Lost Sunheart | I'Max | January 4, 1992 | Unreleased | HuCard |
| Boxyboy •Sōkoban World^{JP} | NEC (US); Media Rings (JP) | March 16, 1990 | October 1990 | HuCard |
| Brandish | NEC Home Electronics | June 17, 1994 | Unreleased | Arcade CD-ROM² |
| Bravoman •Chōzetsurin-jin Berabōman^{JP} | NEC (US); Namco (JP) | July 13, 1990 | October 1990 | HuCard |
| Break In | Naxat Soft | August 10, 1989 | Unreleased | HuCard |
| Browning | Telenet Japan | February 7, 1992 | Unreleased | Super CD-ROM² |
| Bubblegum Crash! | Naxat Soft | December 6, 1991 | Unreleased | HuCard |
| Builder Land | Micro World | April 1, 1992 | Unreleased | Super CD-ROM² |
| Bullfight Ring no Hasha | Cream | December 8, 1989 | Unreleased | HuCard |
| Burai | Riverhillsoft | August 9, 1991 | Unreleased | CD-ROM² |
| Burai II | Riverhillsoft | December 18, 1992 | Unreleased | Super CD-ROM² |
| Burning Angels | Naxat Soft | December 7, 1990 | Unreleased | HuCard |
| Buster Bros. •Pomping World^{JP} | TTI (US); Hudson Soft (JP) | May 31, 1991 | January 1993 | CD-ROM² |
| Cadash | Working Designs (US); Taito (JP) | January 18, 1991 | November 1991 | HuCard |
| CAL II | NEC Avenue | March 31, 1993 | Unreleased | Super CD-ROM² |
| Cal III | NEC Avenue | March 25, 1994 | Unreleased | Super CD-ROM² |
| Camp California | TTI | Unreleased | January 1993 | Super CD-ROM² |
| Card Angels | Fujicom | December 9, 1994 | Unreleased | Super CD-ROM² |
| Akumajō Dracula X: Chi no Rondo | Konami | October 29, 1993 | Unreleased | Super CD-ROM² |
| CD Battle: Hikari no Yūshatachi | King Records | March 19, 1993 | Unreleased | Super CD-ROM² |
| Champion Wrestler | Taito | December 14, 1990 | Unreleased | HuCard |
| Champions Forever Boxing | NEC | Unreleased | October 1991 | HuCard |
| Championship Rally | Intec | August 6, 1993 | Unreleased | Super CD-ROM² |
| Chase H.Q. •Taito Chase HQ^{JP} | TTI (US); Taito (JP) | January 26, 1990 | November 1992 | HuCard |
| Chew Man Fu •Be Ball^{JP} | NEC (US); Hudson Soft (JP) | March 30, 1990 | July 1990 | HuCard |
| Chibi Maruko-chan: Quiz de Piihira | Namco | January 10, 1992 | Unreleased | HuCard |
| Chiki Chiki Boys | NEC Avenue | July 15, 1994 | Unreleased | Super CD-ROM² |
| Chikudenya Tōbē | Naxat Soft | January 26, 1990 | Unreleased | HuCard |
| China Warrior •The Kung Fu^{JP} | NEC (US); Hudson Soft (JP) | November 27, 1987 | November 1989 | HuCard |
| Cho Aniki | Masaya | December 25, 1992 | Unreleased | Super CD-ROM² |
| Chō Jikū Yōsai Macross: Eien no Love Song | Masaya | December 4, 1992 | Unreleased | Super CD-ROM² |
| Chō Jikū Yōsai Macross 2036 | Masaya | April 3, 1992 | Unreleased | Super CD-ROM² |
| Circus Lido | Uni Post Company Ltd | April 6, 1991 | Unreleased | HuCard |
| City Hunter | Sunsoft | March 2, 1990 | Unreleased | HuCard |
| Cobra: Kokuryū-Ō no Densetsu | Hudson Soft | March 31, 1989 | Unreleased | CD-ROM² |
| Cobra II: Densetsu no Otoko | Hudson Soft | June 7, 1991 | Unreleased | CD-ROM² |
| Color Wars | Coconuts Japan | July 10, 1992 | Unreleased | CD-ROM² |
| Columns | Telenet Japan | March 29, 1991 | Unreleased | HuCard |
| Coryoon: Child of Dragon | Naxat Soft | November 29, 1991 | Unreleased | HuCard |
| Cosmic Fantasy 2 •Cosmic Fantasy 2: Bōken Shōnen Van^{JP} | Working Designs (US); Telenet Japan (JP) | April 5, 1991 | June 1992 | CD-ROM² |
| Cosmic Fantasy 3: Bōken Shōnen Rei | Telenet Japan | September 25, 1992 | Unreleased | Super CD-ROM² |
| Cosmic Fantasy 4: Ginga Shōnen Densetsu: Gekitōhen | Telenet Japan | November 25, 1994 | Unreleased | Super CD-ROM² |
| Cosmic Fantasy 4: Ginga Shōnen Densetsu: Totsunyūhen | Telenet Japan | June 10, 1994 | Unreleased | Super CD-ROM² |
| Cosmic Fantasy: Bōken Shōnen Yū | Telenet Japan | March 30, 1990 | Unreleased | CD-ROM² |
| Cotton: Fantastic Night Dreams •Cotton^{JP} | TTI (US); Hudson Soft (JP) | February 12, 1993 | April 1993 | Super CD-ROM² |
| Cratermaze •Doraemon: Meikyū Daisakusen^{JP} | NEC (US); Hudson Soft (JP) | October 31, 1989 (Note: The overseas version lacks the Doraemon license.) | April 1990 | HuCard |
| Cross Wiber: Cyber Combat Police | Face | December 21, 1990 | Unreleased | HuCard |
| Cyber City Oedo: Kemono no Alignment | Masaya | March 15, 1991 | Unreleased | CD-ROM² |
| Cyber Core | NEC (US); IGS (JP) | March 9, 1990 | May 1990 | HuCard |
| Cyber Cross | Face | June 23, 1989 | Unreleased | HuCard |
| Cyber Dodge | Tonkin House | January 31, 1992 | Unreleased | HuCard |
| Cyber Knight | Tonkin House | October 12, 1990 | Unreleased | HuCard |
| Dai Makaimura | NEC Avenue | July 27, 1990 | Unreleased | SuperGrafx |
| Daichikun Crisis | Salio | November 22, 1989 | Unreleased | HuCard |
| Daisenpū Custom | NEC Avenue | July 26, 1991 | Unreleased | CD-ROM² |
| Daisenpū | NEC Avenue | December 14, 1990 | Unreleased | HuCard |
| Daisenryaku II: Campaign Version | Micro Cabin | May 29, 1992 | Unreleased | Super CD-ROM² |
| Darius Alpha | NEC Avenue | 1990 | Unreleased | HuCard (PC-SG) |
| Darius Plus | NEC Avenue | September 21, 1990 | Unreleased | HuCard (PC-SG) |
| Darkwing Duck | TTI | Unreleased | January 1992 | HuCard |
| Davis Cup Tennis •The Davis Cup Tennis^{JP} | NEC (US); Micro World (JP) | April 1, 1992 | December 1991 | HuCard^{US} Super CD-ROM²^{JP} |
| Dead Moon | TTI (US); T.T.S (JP) | February 22, 1991 | October 1992 | HuCard |
| Dead of the Brain 1 & 2 | NEC Home Electronics | June 3, 1999 | Unreleased | Super CD-ROM² |
| Death Bringer | Telenet Japan | April 27, 1990 | Unreleased | CD-ROM² |
| Deep Blue •Deep Blue: Kaitei Shinwa^{JP} | NEC (US); Pack-In-Video (JP) | March 31, 1989 | April 1990 | HuCard |
| Deko Boko Densetsu | Telenet Japan | November 2, 1990 | Unreleased | CD-ROM² |
| Dennō Tenshi: Digital Angel | Tokuma Shoten Intermedia | November 28, 1994 | Unreleased | Super CD-ROM² |
| Detana!! TwinBee | Konami | February 28, 1992 | Unreleased | HuCard |
| Devil's Crush •Devil Crash^{JP} | NEC (US); Naxat Soft (JP) | July 20, 1990 | September 1990 | HuCard |
| DE.JA | NEC Interchannel | July 12, 1996 | Unreleased | Super CD-ROM² |
| Die Hard | Pack-In-Video (distribution); Nichibutsu | September 28, 1990 | Unreleased | HuCard |
| Digital Champ: Battle Boxing | Naxat Soft | October 13, 1989 | Unreleased | HuCard |
| Digital Comic Patlabor: Chapter of Griffon | Riverhillsoft | September 30, 1993 | Unreleased | Super CD-ROM² |
| Dōkyūsei | NEC Avenue | November 23, 1995 | Unreleased | Super CD-ROM² |
| Don Doko Don | Taito | May 31, 1990 | Unreleased | HuCard |
| Doraemon: Nobita no Dorabian Night | Hudson Soft | December 6, 1991 | Unreleased | HuCard |
| Doraemon: Nobita no Dorabian Night (CD) | Hudson Soft | May 29, 1992 | Unreleased | Super CD-ROM² |
| Double Dragon II: The Revenge | Naxat Soft | March 5, 1993 | Unreleased | Super CD-ROM² |
| Double Dungeons | NEC (US); Masaya (JP) | September 29, 1989 | July 1990 | HuCard |
| Double Ring •W-Ring: The Double Rings^{JP} | Naxat Soft | September 28, 1990 | Unreleased | HuCard |
| Download | NEC Avenue | June 22, 1990 | Unreleased | HuCard |
| Download 2 | NEC Avenue | March 29, 1991 | Unreleased | CD-ROM² |
| Downtown Nekketsu Kōshinkyoku | Naxat Soft | December 11, 1992 | Unreleased | Super CD-ROM² |
| Downtown Nekketsu Monogatari | Naxat Soft | December 24, 1993 | Unreleased | Super CD-ROM² |
| Dragon Ball Z: Idainaru Son Goku Densetsu | Bandai | November 11, 1994 | Unreleased | Super CD-ROM² |
| Dragon EGG! | Masaya | September 27, 1991 | Unreleased | HuCard |
| Dragon Half | Micro Cabin | September 30, 1994 | Unreleased | Super CD-ROM² |
| Dragon Knight & Graffiti | NEC Avenue | March 31, 1995 | Unreleased | Super CD-ROM² |
| Dragon Knight II | NEC Avenue | August 7, 1992 | Unreleased | Super CD-ROM² |
| Dragon Knight III | NEC Avenue | July 22, 1994 | Unreleased | Super CD-ROM² |
| Dragon Saber | Namco | December 27, 1991 | Unreleased | HuCard |
| Dragon Slayer: The Legend of Heroes •Dragon Slayer: Eiyū Densetsu^{JP} | TTI (US); Hudson Soft (JP) | October 25, 1991 | December 1992 | Super CD-ROM² |
| Dragon Slayer: The Legend of Heroes II | Hudson Soft | December 22, 1992 | Unreleased | Super CD-ROM² |
| Dragon Spirit | NEC (US); Namco (JP) | December 16, 1988 | November 1989 | HuCard |
| Dragon's Curse •Adventure Island^{JP} | NEC (US); Hudson Soft (JP) | April 19, 1991 | December 1990 | HuCard |
| Drop Off •Drop Rock Hora Hora^{JP} | NEC (US); Data East (JP) | March 30, 1990 | October 1990 | HuCard |
| Dungeons & Dragons: Order of the Griffon | TTI | Unreleased | September 1992 | HuCard |
| Dungeon Explorer | NEC (US); Hudson Soft (JP) | March 4, 1989 | November 15, 1989 | HuCard |
| Dungeon Explorer II | TTI (US); Hudson Soft (JP) | March 26, 1993 | October 1993 | Super CD-ROM² |
| Dungeon Master •Dungeon Master: Theron's Quest^{JP} | TTI (US); Victor Musical Industries (JP) | September 18, 1992 | May 1993 | Super CD-ROM² |
| Dynastic Hero, The •Chō Eiyū Densetsu Dynastic Hero^{JP} | TTI (US); Victor Entertainment (JP) | May 20, 1994 | March 1994 | Super CD-ROM² |
| Efera and Jiliora: The Emblem from Darkness | Brain Grey | December 13, 1991 | Unreleased | CD-ROM² |
| Eikan wa Kimi ni | Artdink | July 15, 1994 | Unreleased | Arcade CD-ROM² |
| Eiyū Saigokushi | Irem | March 26, 1993 | Unreleased | Super CD-ROM² |
| Emerald Dragon | NEC Home Electronics | January 17, 1994 | Unreleased | Super CD-ROM² |
| Energy | Masaya | April 19, 1989 | Unreleased | HuCard |
| Exile | Working Designs (US); Telenet Japan (JP) | March 29, 1991 | October 1992 | CD-ROM² |
| Exile: Wicked Phenomenon •Exile II^{JP} | Working Designs (US); Telenet Japan (JP) | September 22, 1992 | June 1993 | Super CD-ROM² |
| F-1 Dream | NEC Avenue | August 25, 1989 | Unreleased | HuCard |
| F-1 Pilot | Pack-In-Video | March 23, 1989 | Unreleased | HuCard |
| F1 Circus | Nichibutsu | September 14, 1990 | Unreleased | HuCard |
| F1 Circus '91 | Nichibutsu | July 12, 1991 | Unreleased | HuCard |
| F1 Circus '92 | Nichibutsu | December 18, 1992 | Unreleased | HuCard |
| F1 Circus Special | Nichibutsu | June 26, 1992 | Unreleased | Super CD-ROM² |
| F1 Team Simulation Project F | Telenet Japan | September 4, 1992 | Unreleased | Super CD-ROM² |
| F1 Triple Battle | Human | December 23, 1989 | Unreleased | HuCard |
| Faceball | Riverhillsoft | November 26, 1993 | Unreleased | Super CD-ROM² |
| Falcon | TTI | Unreleased | July 1992 | HuCard |
| Fang of Alnam | Right Stuff | December 23, 1994 | Unreleased | Super CD-ROM² |
| Fantasy Zone | NEC (US); NEC Avenue (JP) | October 14, 1988 | November 1989 | HuCard |
| Farjius no Jakōtei | Human Entertainment | August 29, 1992 | Unreleased | Super CD-ROM² |
| Faussete Amour | Naxat Soft | March 26, 1993 | Unreleased | Super CD-ROM² |
| Fiend Hunter | Right Stuff | April 16, 1993 | Unreleased | Super CD-ROM² |
| Fighting Run | Nichibutsu | November 29, 1991 | Unreleased | HuCard |
| Fighting Street | NEC (US); Hudson Soft (JP) | December 4, 1988 | November 1989 | CD-ROM² |
| Final Blaster | Namco | September 28, 1990 | Unreleased | HuCard |
| Final Lap Twin | NEC (US); Namco (JP) | July 7, 1989 | February 1990 | HuCard |
| Final Match Tennis | Human | March 1, 1991 | Unreleased | HuCard |
| Final Soldier | Hudson Soft | July 5, 1991 | Unreleased | HuCard |
| Final Zone II | NEC (US); Telenet Japan (JP) | March 23, 1990 | November 1990 | CD-ROM² |
| Fire Pro Joshi: Shōmu Chōjo Taisen: Zenjo vs. JWP | Human Entertainment | February 3, 1995 | Unreleased | Arcade CD-ROM² |
| Fire Pro Wrestling 2nd Bout | Human | August 30, 1991 | Unreleased | HuCard |
| Fire Pro Wrestling 3 Legend Bout | Human Entertainment | November 13, 1992 | Unreleased | HuCard |
| Fire Pro Wrestling Combination Tag | Human | June 22, 1989 | Unreleased | HuCard |
| Flash Hiders | Right Stuff | December 19, 1993 | Unreleased | Super CD-ROM² |
| Forgotten Worlds | TTI (US); NEC Avenue (JP) | March 27, 1992 | November 1992 | Super CD-ROM² |
| Formation Armed F | Pack-In-Video | March 23, 1990 | Unreleased | HuCard |
| Formation Soccer | Human | April 27, 1990 | Unreleased | HuCard |
| Formation Soccer '95 della Seria A | Human Entertainment | April 7, 1995 | Unreleased | Arcade CD-ROM² |
| Formation Soccer on J-League | Human Entertainment | January 15, 1994 | Unreleased | HuCard |
| World Circuit | Namco | October 18, 1991 | Unreleased | HuCard |
| Fray CD: Xak Gaiden | Micro Cabin | March 30, 1994 | Unreleased | Super CD-ROM² |
| Fushigi no Yume no Alice | Face | December 7, 1990 | Unreleased | HuCard |
| Gaia no Monshō | Masaya | September 23, 1988 | Unreleased | HuCard |
| Gaiflame | Masaya | January 26, 1990 | Unreleased | HuCard |
| Gain Ground SX | NEC Avenue | December 25, 1992 | Unreleased | Super CD-ROM² |
| Galaga '90 •Galaga '88^{JP} | NEC (US); Namco (JP) | July 15, 1988 | November 1989 | HuCard |
| Galaxy Deka Gayvan | Intec | October 29, 1993 | Unreleased | Super CD-ROM² |
| Galaxy Fraulein Yuna | Hudson Soft | October 23, 1992 | Unreleased | Super CD-ROM² |
| Galaxy Fräulein Yuna 2 | Hudson Soft | June 30, 1995 | Unreleased | Super CD-ROM² |
| Ganbare! Golf Boys | Masaya | March 28, 1989 | Unreleased | HuCard |
| Garō Densetsu 2 | Hudson Soft | March 12, 1994 | Unreleased | Arcade CD-ROM² |
| Garō Densetsu Special | Hudson Soft | December 2, 1994 | Unreleased | Arcade CD-ROM² |
| Gate of Thunder | TTI (US); Hudson Soft (JP) | February 21, 1992 | October 10, 1992 | Super CD-ROM² |
| Gekisha Boy | Irem | October 2, 1992 | Unreleased | HuCard |
| Genji Tsūshin Agedama | NEC Home Electronics | December 13, 1991 | Unreleased | HuCard |
| Genocide | Brain Gray | June 25, 1992 | Unreleased | Super CD-ROM² |
| Genpei Tōma Den | Namco | March 16, 1990 | Unreleased | HuCard |
| Gensō Tairiku Auleria | Taito | February 26, 1993 | Unreleased | CD-ROM² |
| Ghost Manor | TTI | Unreleased | October 1992 | HuCard |
| Ghost Sweeper Mikami | Banpresto | July 29, 1994 | Unreleased | Super CD-ROM² |
| Ginga Fukei Densetsu Sapphire | Hudson Soft | November 24, 1995 | Unreleased | Arcade CD-ROM² |
| Go! Go! Birdie Chance | NEC Home Electronics | June 28, 1996 | Unreleased | Super CD-ROM² |
| God Panic: Shijō Saikyō Gundan | Teichiku | November 27, 1992 | Unreleased | Super CD-ROM² |
| Godzilla •Gojira: Bakutō Retsuden^{JP} | TTI (US); Toho (JP) | February 26, 1994 | October 3, 1994 | Super CD-ROM² |
| Gokuraku! Chūka Daisen | Taito | March 13, 1992 | Unreleased | HuCard |
| Golden Axe | Telenet Japan | March 16, 1990 | Unreleased | CD-ROM² |
| Gomola Speed | UPL | September 28, 1990 | Unreleased | HuCard |
| Götzendiener | NEC Home Electronics | November 25, 1994 | Unreleased | Super CD-ROM² |
| Gradius | Konami | November 15, 1991 | Unreleased | HuCard |
| Gradius II | Konami | December 18, 1992 | Unreleased | Super CD-ROM² |
| Sotsugyō II | Riverhillsoft | December 23, 1994 | Unreleased | Super CD-ROM² |
| Gulclight TDF-2 | Pack-In-Video | January 25, 1991 | Unreleased | CD-ROM² |
| Gulliver Boy | Hudson Soft | May 26, 1995 | Unreleased | Super CD-ROM² |
| Gunboat | NEC | Unreleased | June 1992 | HuCard |
| Gambler Jiko Chūshinha: Gekitō Sanjūroku Janshi | Hudson Soft | November 24, 1989 | Unreleased | CD-ROM² |
| Gambler Jiko Chūshinha: Mahjong Puzzle Collection | Taito | February 28, 1992 | Unreleased | CD-ROM² |
| Hana Tāka Daka!? | Taito | August 9, 1991 | Unreleased | HuCard |
| Hataraku Shōjo: Tekipaki Working Love | NEC Home Electronics | March 28, 1997 | Unreleased | Super CD-ROM² |
| Hatris | Micro Cabin | May 24, 1991 | Unreleased | HuCard |
| Hatsukoi Monogatari | Tokuma Shoten Intermedia | April 28, 1994 | Unreleased | Super CD-ROM² |
| Hawk F-123 | Pack-In-Video | March 13, 1992 | Unreleased | Super CD-ROM² |
| Heavy Unit | Taito | December 22, 1989 | Unreleased | HuCard |
| Hellfire S | NEC Avenue | April 12, 1991 | Unreleased | CD-ROM² |
| High Grenadier | Telenet Japan | April 12, 1991 | Unreleased | CD-ROM² |
| Hihō Densetsu: Chris no Bōken | Pack-In-Video | December 13, 1991 | Unreleased | CD-ROM² |
| Himitsu no Hanazono | Tokuma Shoten Intermedia | December 10, 1993 | Unreleased | Super CD-ROM² |
| Hisō Kihei Kai-Serd (Note: Stylized as Χ-SERD, spelled with the Greek letter Chi.) | Masaya | February 23, 1990 | Unreleased | HuCard |
| Hit the Ice | TTI (US); Taito (JP) | September 20, 1991 | November 1992 | HuCard |
| Honey in the Sky | Face | March 1, 1989 | Unreleased | HuCard |
| Honey on the Road | Face | September 14, 1990 | Unreleased | HuCard |
| Honō no Dōkyūji: Dodge Danpei | Hudson Soft | September 25, 1992 | Unreleased | HuCard |
| Horror Story | NEC Avenue | February 26, 1993 | Unreleased | Super CD-ROM² |
| Human Sports Festival | Human | February 28, 1992 | Unreleased | Super CD-ROM² |
| Hyakumonogatari: Honto ni Atta Kowai Hanashi | Hudson Soft | August 4, 1995 | Unreleased | Super CD-ROM² |
| Hyper Wars | Hudson Soft | November 5, 1994 | Unreleased | Super CD-ROM² |
| I.Q. Panic | IGS | February 21, 1992 | Unreleased | CD-ROM² |
| Iga Ninden Gaiō | Nichibutsu | December 10, 1993 | Unreleased | Super CD-ROM² |
| Image Fight | Irem | July 27, 1990 | Unreleased | HuCard |
| Image Fight II | Irem | December 18, 1992 | Unreleased | Super CD-ROM² |
| Impossamole | NEC | Unreleased | October 1991 | HuCard |
| It Came From The Desert | NEC | Unreleased | December 1991 | CD-ROM² |
| J-League Greatest Eleven | Nichibutsu | May 14, 1993 | Unreleased | HuCard |
| Jack Nicklaus' Turbo Golf •Jack Nicklaus Championship Golf^{JP} | Accolade (US); Victor Musical Industries (JP) | November 24, 1989 | 1990 | HuCard |
| Jack Nicklaus' Turbo Golf •Jack Nicklaus' World Golf Tour^{JP} | Accolade (US); Victor Musical Industries (JP) | September 14, 1990 | 1990 | CD-ROM² |
| Jackie Chan's Action Kung Fu •Jackie Chan^{JP} | TTI (US); Hudson Soft (JP) | January 18, 1991 | August 1992 | HuCard |
| Janshin Densetsu: Quest of Jongmaster | NEC Home Electronics | February 24, 1995 | Unreleased | Arcade CD-ROM² |
| Jantei Monogatari | Telenet Japan | October 9, 1990 | Unreleased | CD-ROM² |
| Jantei Monogatari 2: Uchū Tantei Diban: Kanketsu Hen | Atlus | April 24, 1992 | Unreleased | CD-ROM² |
| Jantei Monogatari 2: Uchū Tantei Diban: Shutsudō Hen | Atlus | February 28, 1992 | Unreleased | CD-ROM² |
| Jantei Monogatari 3: Saver Angels | Atlus | April 23, 1993 | Unreleased | Super CD-ROM² |
| Jaseiken Necromancer | Hudson Soft | January 22, 1988 | Unreleased | HuCard |
| Jigoku Meguri | Taito | August 3, 1990 | Unreleased | HuCard |
| Jim Power | Micro World | March 19, 1993 | Unreleased | Super CD-ROM² |
| Jinmu Denshō Yaksa | Big Club | June 28, 1989 | Unreleased | HuCard |
| John Madden Duo CD Football | TTI | Unreleased | September 1993 | Super CD-ROM² |
| Jūōki (CD) | NEC Avenue | September 22, 1989 | Unreleased | CD-ROM² |
| Jūōki | NEC Avenue | September 29, 1989 | Unreleased | HuCard |
| J. League Tremendous Soccer '94 | NEC Home Electronics | December 23, 1994 | Unreleased | Arcade CD-ROM² |
| J.B. Harold Murder Club | NEC (US); Hudson Soft (JP) | November 23, 1990 | August 1991 | CD-ROM² |
| J.J. & Jeff •Kato-chan Ken-chan^{JP} | NEC (US); Hudson Soft (JP) | November 30, 1987 (Note: The English localization was graphically modified, changing the races of the two main characters and replacing the player's fart attack with a spray can.) | March 15, 1990 | HuCard |
| Kabuki Ittō Ryōdan | Hudson Soft | February 24, 1995 | Unreleased | Arcade CD-ROM² |
| Kagami no Kuni no Legend | Victor Musical Industries | October 27, 1989 | Unreleased | CD-ROM² |
| Kaizō Chōjin Shubibinman | Masaya | March 18, 1989 | Unreleased | HuCard |
| Kaizō Chōjin Shubibinman 3: Ikai no Princess | Masaya | February 28, 1992 | Unreleased | CD-ROM² |
| Kakuto Haō Densetsu Algunos | Intec | January 21, 1994 | Unreleased | Super CD-ROM² |
| Kattobi! Takuhai-Kun | Tonkin House | November 9, 1990 | Unreleased | HuCard |
| Kawa no Nushizuri: Shizenha | Pack-In-Video | March 27, 1992 | Unreleased | CD-ROM² |
| Kaze Kiri | Naxat Soft | April 28, 1994 | Unreleased | Super CD-ROM² |
| Keith Courage in Alpha Zones •Mashin Eiyūden Wataru^{JP} | NEC (US); Hudson Soft (JP) | August 30, 1988 | August 29, 1989 | HuCard |
| Kiaidan 00 | Telenet Japan | October 23, 1992 | Unreleased | Super CD-ROM² |
| Kickball | Masaya | November 23, 1990 | Unreleased | HuCard |
| Kiki Kaikai | Taito | March 27, 1990 | Unreleased | HuCard |
| King of Casino | NEC (US); Victor Musical Industries (JP) | March 30, 1990 | June 1990 | HuCard |
| Kisō Lōga | Kogado Studio | December 3, 1993 | Unreleased | Super CD-ROM² |
| Klax | Tengen | August 10, 1990 | September 1990 | HuCard |
| Knight Rider Special | Pack-In-Video | December 22, 1989 | Unreleased | HuCard |
| Kore ga Pro Yakyū '89 | Intec | December 15, 1989 | Unreleased | HuCard |
| Kore ga Pro Yakyū '90 | Intec | June 29, 1990 | Unreleased | HuCard |
| Kyūkyoku Tiger | Taito | March 31, 1989 | Unreleased | HuCard |
| K.O. Seiki Beast Sanjūshi | Pack-In-Video | June 17, 1994 | Unreleased | Super CD-ROM² |
| L-Dis | Masaya | April 5, 1991 | Unreleased | CD-ROM² |
| La Valeur | Kogado Studio | March 22, 1991 | Unreleased | CD-ROM² |
| Lady Phantom | Telenet Japan | November 29, 1991 | Unreleased | Super CD-ROM² |
| Langrisser: Hikari no Matsuei | Masaya | August 6, 1993 | Unreleased | Super CD-ROM² |
| Laplace no Ma | Human Entertainment | March 30, 1993 | Unreleased | Super CD-ROM² |
| Last Alert •Red Alert^{JP} | NEC (US); Telenet Japan (JP) | December 28, 1989 | November 1990 | CD-ROM² |
| Last Armageddon | Brain Grey | August 31, 1990 | Unreleased | CD-ROM² |
| Legend of Hero Tonma | TTI (US); Irem (JP) | March 13, 1991 | February 1993 | HuCard |
| Legend of Xanadu, The | NEC Home Electronics | February 18, 1994 | Unreleased | Super CD-ROM² |
| Legend of Xanadu II, The | Nihon Falcom | June 30, 1995 | Unreleased | Super CD-ROM² |
| Legendary Axe, The •Makyō Densetsu^{JP} | NEC (US); Victor Musical Industries (JP) | September 23, 1988 | August 29, 1989 | HuCard |
| Legendary Axe II, The •Ankoku Densetsu^{JP} | NEC (US); Victor Musical Industries (JP) | September 7, 1990 | October 1990 | HuCard |
| Legion | Telenet Japan | September 21, 1990 | Unreleased | CD-ROM² |
| Lemmings | Sunsoft | November 28, 1992 | Unreleased | Super CD-ROM² |
| Linda³ | NEC Home Electronics | October 13, 1995 | Unreleased | Arcade CD-ROM² |
| Lode Runner: Ushina Wareta Meikyū | Pack-In-Video | July 27, 1990 | Unreleased | HuCard |
| Loom | TTI (US); Victor Musical Industries (JP) | September 25, 1992 | November 1992 | Super CD-ROM² |
| Lord of Wars | SystemSoft | November 29, 1991 | Unreleased | CD-ROM² |
| Lords of the Rising Sun •Rising Sun^{JP} | NEC (US); Victor Musical Industries (JP) | March 13, 1992 | July 1992 | CD-ROM² |
| Lords of Thunder •Winds of Thunder^{JP} | TTI (US); Hudson Soft (JP) | April 23, 1993 | March 1993 | Super CD-ROM² |
| Lōga II: The Ends of Shangrila | NEC Home Electronics | May 26, 1995 | Unreleased | Super CD-ROM² |
| Mad Stalker: Full Metal Force | NEC Home Electronics | September 15, 1994 | Unreleased | Arcade CD-ROM² |
| Madō King Granzort | Hudson Soft | April 6, 1990 | Unreleased | SuperGrafx |
| Madō Monogatari I | NEC Avenue | December 13, 1996 | Unreleased | Arcade CD-ROM² |
| Magical Chase | TTI (US); Palsoft (JP) | November 15, 1991 | July 1993 | HuCard |
| Magical Dinosaur Tour •Magical Saurus Tour^{JP} | NEC (US); Victor Musical Industries (JP) | August 24, 1990 | December 1990 | CD-ROM² |
| Magicoal | NEC Home Electronics | October 29, 1993 | Unreleased | Super CD-ROM² |
| Mahjong Clinic Special | Naxat Soft | September 24, 1993 | Unreleased | Super CD-ROM² |
| Mahjong Gakuen - Tōma Sōhirō Tōjō | Face | November 24, 1989 | Unreleased | HuCard |
| Mahjong Gakuen Mild | Face | June 29, 1990 | Unreleased | HuCard |
| Mahjong Gokū Special | Sunsoft | August 10, 1990 | Unreleased | HuCard |
| Mahjong Haōden: Kaiser's Quest | UPL | February 28, 1992 | Unreleased | HuCard |
| Mahjong Lemon Angel | Naxat Soft | February 25, 1994 | Unreleased | Super CD-ROM² |
| Mahjong on the Beach | NEC Avenue | September 30, 1993 | Unreleased | Super CD-ROM² |
| Mahjong Shikaku Retsuden: Mahjong Wars | Nichibutsu | February 1, 1990 | Unreleased | HuCard |
| Mahjong Sword Princess Quest Gaiden | Naxat Soft | August 11, 1995 | Unreleased | Arcade CD-ROM² |
| Mahjong Vanilla Syndrome | Nichibutsu | October 25, 1991 | Unreleased | CD-ROM² |
| Maison Ikkoku | Micro Cabin | August 4, 1989 | Unreleased | HuCard |
| Makai Hakkenden Shada | Data East | April 1, 1989 | Unreleased | HuCard |
| Makai Prince Dorabocchan | Naxat Soft | December 21, 1990 | Unreleased | HuCard |
| Inoue Mami: Kono Hoshi ni Tatta Hitori no Kimi | Hudson Soft | December 25, 1992 | Unreleased | Super CD-ROM² |
| Mamono Hunter Yōko: Makai Kara no Tenkōsai | Masaya | March 13, 1992 | Unreleased | CD-ROM² |
| Mamono Hunter Yōko: Tooki Yobikoe | Masaya | January 8, 1993 | Unreleased | Super CD-ROM² |
| The Manhole | Sunsoft | March 22, 1991 | Unreleased | CD-ROM² |
| Maniac Pro Wrestling | Hudson Soft | May 25, 1990 | Unreleased | HuCard |
| Märchen Maze | Namco | December 11, 1990 | Unreleased | HuCard |
| Martial Champion | Konami | December 17, 1993 | Unreleased | Super CD-ROM² |
| Master of Monsters | Micro Cabin | February 15, 1991 | Unreleased | CD-ROM² |
| Mateki Densetsu Astralius | IGS | June 21, 1991 | Unreleased | CD-ROM² |
| Megami Paradise | NEC Home Electronics | September 30, 1994 | Unreleased | Super CD-ROM² |
| Meikyū no Elfine | Telenet Japan | July 6, 1990 | Unreleased | CD-ROM² |
| Metal Angel | Pack-In-Video | September 24, 1993 | Unreleased | Super CD-ROM² |
| Metal Angel 2 | Pack-In-Video | January 20, 1995 | Unreleased | Super CD-ROM² |
| Metal Stoker | Face | July 12, 1991 | Unreleased | HuCard |
| Metamor Jupiter | NEC Home Electronics | January 14, 1993 | Unreleased | Super CD-ROM² |
| Might & Magic | NEC Avenue | January 24, 1992 | Unreleased | CD-ROM² |
| Might and Magic III: Isles of Terra | TTI (US); Hudson Soft (JP) | October 29, 1993 | August 17, 1994 | Super CD-ROM² |
| Military Madness •Nectaris^{JP} | NEC (US); Hudson Soft (JP) | February 9, 1989 | February 1990 | HuCard |
| Minesweeper | Pack-In-Video | March 20, 1992 | Unreleased | CD-ROM² |
| Mirai Shōnen Conan | Telenet Japan | February 28, 1992 | Unreleased | Super CD-ROM² |
| Mitsubachi Gakuen | Hudson Soft | September 14, 1990 | Unreleased | CD-ROM² |
| Mizubaku Daibōken | Taito | January 17, 1992 | Unreleased | HuCard |
| Momotaro Densetsu Gaiden Dai Ichi Shu | Hudson Soft | December 4, 1992 | Unreleased | HuCard |
| Momotarō Densetsu Turbo | Hudson Soft | July 20, 1990 | Unreleased | HuCard |
| Momotarō Densetsu II | Hudson Soft | December 22, 1990 | Unreleased | HuCard |
| Momotarō Katsugeki | Hudson Soft | September 21, 1990 | Unreleased | HuCard |
| Monster Lair •Wonder Boy III: Monster Lair^{JP} | NEC (US); Hudson Soft (JP) | August 31, 1989 | December 1989 | CD-ROM² |
| Monster Maker: Yami no Ryūkishi | NEC Avenue | March 30, 1994 | Unreleased | Super CD-ROM² |
| Monster Pro Wrestling | ASK Kodansha | November 22, 1991 | Unreleased | HuCard |
| Moonlight Lady | NEC Home Electronics | March 26, 1993 | Unreleased | Super CD-ROM² |
| Morita Shogi PC | NEC Avenue | September 27, 1991 | Unreleased | HuCard |
| Motteke Tamago | Naxat Soft | April 16, 1997 | Unreleased | Super CD-ROM² |
| Moto Roader | NEC (US); Masaya (JP) | February 23, 1989 | December 1989 | HuCard |
| Moto Roader II | Masaya | March 29, 1991 | Unreleased | HuCard |
| Moto Roader MC | Masaya | December 18, 1992 | Unreleased | Super CD-ROM² |
| Mr. Heli no Daibōken | Irem | December 1, 1989 | Unreleased | HuCard |
| Mystic Formula | Micro Cabin | July 23, 1993 | Unreleased | Super CD-ROM² |
| Fushigi no Umi no Nadia | Hudson Soft | January 29, 1993 | Unreleased | Super CD-ROM² |
| Naritore: The Sugoroku '92 | Telenet Japan | December 20, 1991 | Unreleased | CD-ROM² |
| Naxat Open | Naxat Soft | May 30, 1989 | Unreleased | HuCard |
| Naxat Stadium | Naxat Soft | October 26, 1990 | Unreleased | HuCard |
| Nazo no Masquerade | Masaya | March 2, 1990 | Unreleased | HuCard |
| Necros no Yōsai | ASK Kodansha | April 20, 1990 | Unreleased | HuCard |
| Nekketsu Kōkō Dodgeball Bu: CD Soccer Hen | Naxat Soft | December 20, 1991 | Unreleased | Super CD-ROM² |
| Nekketsu Kōkō Dodgeball Bu: PC Soccer Hen | Naxat Soft | April 3, 1992 | Unreleased | HuCard |
| Nekketsu Kōkō Dodgeball Bu: PC Bangai Hen | Naxat Soft | March 30, 1990 | Unreleased | HuCard |
| Nekketsu Legend Baseballer | Pack-In-Video | June 16, 1995 | Unreleased | Super CD-ROM² |
| Nemurenu Yoru Chiisaina Ohanashi | NEC Home Electronics | July 30, 1993 | Unreleased | Super CD-ROM² |
| Neo Nectaris | Hudson Soft | July 29, 1994 | Unreleased | Super CD-ROM² |
| Neutopia | NEC (US); Hudson Soft (JP) | November 17, 1989 | April 15, 1990 | HuCard |
| Neutopia II | TTI (US); Hudson Soft (JP) | September 27, 1991 | August 1992 | HuCard |
| New Adventure Island •Takahashi Meijin no Shin Bōken Jima^{JP} | TTI (US); Hudson Soft (JP) | June 26, 1992 | September 1992 | HuCard |
| The NewZealand Story | Taito | February 23, 1990 | Unreleased | HuCard |
| Nexzr | Naxat Soft | December 11, 1992 | Unreleased | Super CD-ROM² |
| NHK Taiga Drama Taiheki | NHK Vook | January 31, 1992 | Unreleased | HuCard |
| Night Creatures | NEC | Unreleased | May 1992 | HuCard |
| Niko Niko Pun | NHK Vook | December 13, 1991 | Unreleased | HuCard |
| Ninja Ryūkenden | Hudson Soft | January 24, 1992 | Unreleased | HuCard |
| Ninja Spirit •Saigo no Nindō: Ninja Spirit^{JP} | NEC (US); Irem (JP) | July 6, 1990 | October 1990 | HuCard |
| Ninja Warriors | Taito | June 30, 1989 | Unreleased | HuCard |
| Nishimura Kyōtaro Mystery: Hokutosei no Onna | Naxat Soft | February 23, 1990 | Unreleased | CD-ROM² |
| No-Ri-Ko | Hudson Soft | December 4, 1988 | Unreleased | CD-ROM² |
| Nobunaga no Yabō: Bushō Fūunroku | Koei | February 27, 1993 | Unreleased | Super CD-ROM² |
| Nobunaga no Yabō: Zenkokuban | Koei | December 11, 1993 | Unreleased | Super CD-ROM² |
| Obocchamakun | Namco | March 15, 1991 | Unreleased | HuCard |
| Operation Wolf | NEC Avenue | August 31, 1990 | Unreleased | HuCard |
| Ordyne | NEC (US); Namco (JP) | September 8, 1989 | March 1990 | HuCard |
| Out Live | Sunsoft | March 17, 1989 | Unreleased | HuCard |
| Out Run | NEC Avenue | December 21, 1990 | Unreleased | HuCard |
| Override | Data East | January 8, 1991 | Unreleased | HuCard |
| P-47: The Freedom Fighter | Aicom | March 20, 1989 | Unreleased | HuCard |
| Pac-Land | NEC (US); Namco (JP) | June 1, 1989 | February 1990 | HuCard |
| Pachio-kun: Jūban Shōbu | Coconuts Japan | March 13, 1992 | Unreleased | HuCard |
| Pachio-kun: Maboroshi no Densetsu | Coconuts Japan | April 19, 1991 | Unreleased | CD-ROM² |
| Pachio-kun: Warau Uchū | Coconuts Japan | December 22, 1992 | Unreleased | Super CD-ROM² |
| Pachio-kun 3: Pachislot & Pachinko | Coconuts Japan | April 15, 1994 | Unreleased | Super CD-ROM² |
| Panic Bomber | Hudson Soft | December 22, 1994 | Unreleased | Super CD-ROM² |
| Parasol Stars: The Story of Bubble Bobble III | Working Designs (US); Taito (JP) | February 15, 1991 | October 1991 | HuCard |
| Parodius Da! | Konami | February 21, 1992 | Unreleased | HuCard |
| Pastel Lime | Naxat Soft | December 18, 1992 | Unreleased | Super CD-ROM² |
| Police Connection | Telenet Japan | February 26, 1993 | Unreleased | Super CD-ROM² |
| Pop'n Magic | Telenet Japan | July 24, 1992 | Unreleased | Super CD-ROM² |
| Popful Mail | NEC Home Electronics | August 12, 1994 | Unreleased | Arcade CD-ROM² |
| Populous | Hudson Soft | April 5, 1991 | Unreleased | HuCard |
| Populous: The Promised Lands | Hudson Soft | October 25, 1991 | Unreleased | Super CD-ROM² |
| Power Drift | Asmik | April 13, 1990 | Unreleased | HuCard |
| Power Eleven | Hudson Soft | June 21, 1991 | Unreleased | HuCard |
| Power Gate | Pack-In-Video | August 30, 1991 | Unreleased | HuCard |
| Power Golf | NEC (US); Hudson Soft (JP) | May 25, 1989 | October 1989 | HuCard |
| Power Golf 2 | Hudson Soft | March 4, 1994 | Unreleased | Super CD-ROM² |
| Power League II | Hudson Soft | August 8, 1989 | Unreleased | HuCard |
| Power League III | Hudson Soft | August 10, 1990 | Unreleased | HuCard |
| Power League 4 | Hudson Soft | August 9, 1991 | Unreleased | HuCard |
| Power League V | Hudson Soft | August 7, 1992 | Unreleased | HuCard |
| Power League '93 | Hudson Soft | October 15, 1993 | Unreleased | HuCard |
| Power Tennis | Hudson Soft | June 25, 1993 | Unreleased | HuCard |
| Prince of Persia | TTI (US); Riverhillsoft (JP) | November 8, 1991 | October 1992 | Super CD-ROM² |
| Princess Maker 1 | NEC Home Electronics | January 3, 1995 | Unreleased | Super CD-ROM² |
| Princess Maker 2 | NEC Home Electronics | June 16, 1995 | Unreleased | Arcade CD-ROM² |
| Princess Minerva | Riverhillsoft | March 25, 1994 | Unreleased | Super CD-ROM² |
| Private Eyedol | NEC Home Electronics | August 11, 1995 | Unreleased | Arcade CD-ROM² |
| The Pro Yakyū | Intec | October 5, 1990 | Unreleased | CD-ROM² |
| The Pro Yakyū Super '94 | Intec | June 17, 1994 | Unreleased | Super CD-ROM² |
| Pro Yakyū World Stadium | Namco | May 20, 1988 | Unreleased | HuCard |
| Pro Yakyū World Stadium '91 | Namco | March 21, 1991 | Unreleased | HuCard |
| The Pro Yakyū Super | Intec | October 9, 1992 | Unreleased | Super CD-ROM² |
| Psychic Detective Series Vol. 3: Aýa | Data West | November 20, 1992 | Unreleased | Super CD-ROM² |
| Psychic Detective Vol. 4: Orgel | Data West | August 6, 1993 | Unreleased | Super CD-ROM² |
| Psychic Storm | Telenet Japan | March 19, 1992 | Unreleased | Super CD-ROM² |
| Psycho Chaser | Naxat Soft | April 6, 1990 | Unreleased | HuCard |
| Psychosis •Paranoia^{JP} | NEC (US); Naxat Soft (JP) | March 1, 1990 | October 1990 | HuCard |
| Puyo Puyo CD | NEC Avenue | April 22, 1994 | Unreleased | Super CD-ROM² |
| Puyo Puyo CD Tsū | NEC Interchannel | March 29, 1996 | Unreleased | Super CD-ROM² |
| Puzzle Boy | Telenet Japan | February 22, 1991 | Unreleased | HuCard |
| Puzznic | Taito | June 29, 1990 | Unreleased | HuCard |
| Quiz Avenue | NEC Avenue | February 15, 1991 | Unreleased | CD-ROM² |
| Quiz Avenue II | NEC Avenue | October 11, 1991 | Unreleased | CD-ROM² |
| Quiz Avenue 3 | NEC Avenue | November 25, 1994 | Unreleased | Super CD-ROM² |
| Quiz Caravan Cult Q | Hudson Soft | May 28, 1993 | Unreleased | Super CD-ROM² |
| Quiz de Gakuensai | Naxat Soft | November 26, 1993 | Unreleased | Super CD-ROM² |
| Quiz Marugoto The World | Atlus | April 5, 1991 | Unreleased | CD-ROM² |
| Quiz Marugoto The World: Time Machine ni Onegai! | Atlus | March 27, 1992 | Unreleased | CD-ROM² |
| Quiz no Hoshi | Sunsoft | August 10, 1992 | Unreleased | Super CD-ROM² |
| Quiz Tonosama no Yabō | Hudson Soft | October 10, 1992 | Unreleased | CD-ROM² |
| R-Type | NEC | March 25, 1988 / June 3, 1988 (Note: HuCards, with R-Type I containing the first four stages of the game, while R-Type II contains the final four. When the game was localized for the TurboGrafx-16 in North America, the two halves were combined into one full release.) | November 1989 | HuCard |
| R-Type: Complete CD | Irem | December 20, 1991 | Unreleased | Super CD-ROM² |
| Rabio Lepus Special | Video System | October 19, 1990 | Unreleased | HuCard |
| Racing Damashii | Irem | July 19, 1991 | Unreleased | HuCard |
| Raiden | NEC (US); Hudson Soft (JP) | November 22, 1991 | November 1991 | HuCard |
| Rainbow Islands | NEC Avenue | June 30, 1993 | Unreleased | CD-ROM² |
| Ranma ½ | Masaya | December 7, 1990 | Unreleased | CD-ROM² |
| Ranma ½: Datō, Ganso Musabetsu Kakuto Ryū | Masaya | October 9, 1992 | Unreleased | CD-ROM² |
| Ranma ½: Toraware no Hayanome | Masaya | December 6, 1991 | Unreleased | CD-ROM² |
| Rastan Saga II | Taito | July 6, 1990 | Unreleased | HuCard |
| Rayxanber II | Data West | June 7, 1991 | Unreleased | CD-ROM² |
| Rayxanber III | Data West | June 26, 1992 | Unreleased | Super CD-ROM² |
| Record of Lodoss War | Hudson Soft | July 17, 1992 | Unreleased | CD-ROM² |
| Record of Lodoss War II | Hudson Soft | December 16, 1994 | Unreleased | Super CD-ROM² |
| Renny Blaster | NEC Avenue | June 23, 1995 | Unreleased | Super CD-ROM² |
| Riot Zone •Crest of Wolf^{JP} | TTI (US); Hudson Soft (JP) | February 26, 1993 | February 1993 | Super CD-ROM² |
| Road Spirits | Pack-In-Video | March 22, 1991 | Unreleased | CD-ROM² |
| Rock-On | Big Club | August 25, 1989 | Unreleased | HuCard |
| ROM ROM Stadium | Masaya | December 22, 1989 | Unreleased | CD-ROM² |
| Ruin: Kami no Isan | Victor Entertainment | November 19, 1993 | Unreleased | Super CD-ROM² |
| Ryukyu | Face | October 26, 1990 | Unreleased | HuCard |
| Ryūkō no Ken | Hudson Soft | March 26, 1994 | Unreleased | Arcade CD-ROM² |
| S.C.I. | Taito | January 25, 1991 | Unreleased | HuCard |
| Sadakichi Sebun: Hideyoshi no Ōgon | Hudson Soft | November 18, 1988 | Unreleased | HuCard |
| Saint Dragon | Aicom | December 21, 1990 | Unreleased | HuCard |
| Salamander | Konami | December 6, 1991 | Unreleased | HuCard |
| Samurai Ghost •Genpei Tōmaden: Kannoni^{JP} | TTI (US); Namco (JP) | April 7, 1992 | December 1992 | HuCard |
| Sangokushi: Eiketsu Tenka ni Nozomu | Naxat Soft | March 29, 1991 | Unreleased | CD-ROM² |
| Sangokushi III | Koei | October 2, 1993 | Unreleased | Super CD-ROM² |
| Seirei Senshi Spriggan | Naxat Soft | July 12, 1991 | Unreleased | CD-ROM² |
| Seiryū Densetsu Monbit | Hudson Soft | August 30, 1991 | Unreleased | CD-ROM² |
| Seisenshi Denshō | Nichibutsu | August 5, 1994 | Unreleased | Super CD-ROM² |
| Seiya Monogatari | Hudson Soft | December 22, 1995 | Unreleased | Super CD-ROM² |
| Sekigahara | Tonkin House | September 14, 1990 | Unreleased | HuCard |
| Sengoku Kantō Sangokushi | Intec | June 28, 1991 | Unreleased | CD-ROM² |
| Sengoku Mahjong | Hudson Soft | July 8, 1988 | Unreleased | HuCard |
| Sexy Idol Mahjong | Nichibutsu | December 24, 1993 | Unreleased | Super CD-ROM² |
| Sexy Idol Mahjong: Mahjong Fashion Monogatari | Nichibutsu | September 16, 1994 | Unreleased | Arcade CD-ROM² |
| Sexy Idol Mahjong 2: Yakyūken no Uta | Nichibutsu | January 31, 1995 | Unreleased | Super CD-ROM² |
| Shadow of the Beast | TTI (US); Victor Musical Industries (JP) | March 27, 1992 | November 1992 | Super CD-ROM² |
| Shanghai | Hudson Soft | October 30, 1987 | Unreleased | HuCard |
| Shanghai II | Hudson Soft | April 13, 1990 | Unreleased | CD-ROM² |
| Shanghai III: Dragon's Eye | ASK Kodansha | December 18, 1992 | Unreleased | CD-ROM² |
| Shape Shifter •Shapeshift: Makai Eiyū Den^{JP} | TTI (US); Victor Musical Industries (JP) | September 25, 1992 | October 1992 | Super CD-ROM² |
| Sherlock Holmes Consulting Detective | NEC (US); Victor Musical Industries (JP) | July 26, 1991 | June 1991 | CD-ROM² |
| Sherlock Holmes: Consulting Detective Vol. II | TTI (US); Victor Musical Industries (JP) | May 28, 1993 | June 1993 | Super CD-ROM² |
| Shin Megami Tensei | Atlus | December 25, 1993 | Unreleased | Super CD-ROM² |
| Shin Onryō Senki | Fujicom | September 22, 1995 | Unreleased | Super CD-ROM² |
| Shin Sangokushi: Tenka wa Waga ni | Naxat Soft | November 20, 1992 | Unreleased | CD-ROM² |
| Shinobi | Asmik | December 8, 1989 | Unreleased | HuCard |
| Shiryō Sensen | Victor Musical Industries | March 24, 1989 | Unreleased | HuCard |
| Shockman •Kaizō Chōjin Shubibinman 2: Aratanaru Teki^{JP} | TTI (US); Masaya (JP) | April 27, 1991 | December 1992 | HuCard |
| Shōgi Database Kiyū | SETA | October 28, 1995 | Unreleased | Super CD-ROM² |
| Shogi Shodan Icchokusen | Home Data | August 10, 1990 | Unreleased | HuCard |
| Shogi Shoshinsha Muyō | Home Data | November 29, 1991 | Unreleased | HuCard |
| Side Arms Hyper Dyne •Hyper Dyne Side Arms^{JP} | Radiance Software (US); NEC Avenue (JP) | July 14, 1989 | December 1989 | HuCard |
| Side Arms Special | NEC Avenue | December 15, 1989 | Unreleased | CD-ROM² |
| Silent Debuggers | NEC (US); Data East (JP) | March 29, 1991 | October 1991 | HuCard |
| SimEarth | Hudson Soft | January 14, 1993 | April 1993 | Super CD-ROM² |
| Sindibad: Chitei No Dai Makyu | IGS | June 2, 1990 | Unreleased | HuCard |
| Sinistron •Violent Soldier^{JP} | IGS | December 14, 1990 | January 1991 | HuCard |
| Skweek | Victor Musical Industries | August 2, 1991 | Unreleased | HuCard |
| Slime World | Micro World | October 9, 1992 | Unreleased | Super CD-ROM² |
| Slot Gambler | Nichibutsu | April 28, 1995 | Unreleased | Super CD-ROM² |
| Snatcher CD-ROMantic | Konami | October 23, 1992 | Unreleased | Super CD-ROM² |
| Sol Bianca | Masaya | June 29, 1990 | Unreleased | CD-ROM² |
| Sol Moonarge | Irem | January 7, 1994 | Unreleased | Super CD-ROM² |
| Soldier Blade | TTI (US); Hudson Soft (JP) | July 10, 1992 | September 1992 | HuCard |
| Solid Force | NEC Home Electronics | March 17, 1995 | Unreleased | Super CD-ROM² |
| Somer Assault •Mesopotamia^{JP} | TTI (US); Atlus (JP) | October 4, 1991 | December 1992 | HuCard |
| Sonic Spike •World Beach Volley^{JP} | IGS | July 27, 1990 | September 1990 | HuCard |
| Son Son II | NEC Avenue | January 27, 1989 | Unreleased | HuCard |
| Sorcerian | Victor Musical Industries | July 17, 1992 | Unreleased | Super CD-ROM² |
| Sotsugyō: Graduation | NEC Avenue | July 30, 1993 | Unreleased | Super CD-ROM² |
| Sotsugyō Shashin: Miki | Coconuts Japan | October 28, 1994 | Unreleased | Super CD-ROM² |
| Space Harrier | NEC (US); NEC Avenue (JP) | December 9, 1988 | February 1990 | HuCard |
| Space Invaders: Fukkatsu no Hi | Taito | March 2, 1990 | Unreleased | HuCard |
| Space Invaders: The Original Game | NEC Avenue | July 21, 1995 | Unreleased | Super CD-ROM² |
| Spin Pair | Media Rings | December 14, 1990 | Unreleased | HuCard |
| Spiral Wave | Media Rings | December 13, 1991 | Unreleased | HuCard |
| Splash Lake | TTI (US); NEC Avenue (JP) | June 28, 1991 | August 1992 | CD-ROM² |
| Splatterhouse | NEC (US); Namco (JP) | April 3, 1990 | August 1990 | HuCard |
| Spriggan Mk. II | Naxat Soft | May 1, 1992 | Unreleased | Super CD-ROM² |
| Star Breaker | Ray Force | February 10, 1994 | Unreleased | Super CD-ROM² |
| Star Mobile | Naxat Soft | October 2, 1992 | Unreleased | CD-ROM² |
| Star Parodier | Hudson Soft | April 24, 1992 | Unreleased | Super CD-ROM² |
| Startling Odyssey | Ray Force | October 22, 1993 | Unreleased | Super CD-ROM² |
| Startling Odyssey II | Ray Force | October 21, 1994 | Unreleased | Super CD-ROM² |
| Steam-Heart's | TGL | March 22, 1996 | Unreleased | Super CD-ROM² |
| Stratego | Victor Musical Industries | July 24, 1992 | Unreleased | HuCard |
| Street Fighter II: Champion Edition | NEC Home Electronics | June 12, 1993 | Unreleased | HuCard |
| Strider Hiryū | NEC Avenue | September 22, 1994 | Unreleased | Arcade CD-ROM² |
| Super Air Zonk •CD Denjin: Rockabilly Tengoku^{JP} | TTI (US); Hudson Soft (JP) | July 30, 1993 | April 1994 | Super CD-ROM² |
| Super Albatross | Telenet Japan | September 14, 1989 | Unreleased | CD-ROM² |
| Super Daisenryaku | Micro Cabin | April 27, 1990 | Unreleased | CD-ROM² |
| Super Darius | NEC Avenue | March 16, 1990 | Unreleased | CD-ROM² |
| Super Darius II | NEC Avenue | December 23, 1993 | Unreleased | Super CD-ROM² |
| Super Mahjong Taikai | Koei | December 28, 1992 | Unreleased | Super CD-ROM² |
| Super Metal Crusher | Pack-In-Video | November 29, 1991 | Unreleased | HuCard |
| Super Momotaro Dentetsu | Hudson Soft | September 15, 1989 | Unreleased | HuCard |
| Super Momotarō Dentetsu II | Hudson Soft | December 20, 1991 | Unreleased | HuCard |
| Super Raiden | Hudson Soft | April 2, 1992 | Unreleased | Super CD-ROM² |
| Super Real Mahjong P II/III Custom | Naxat Soft | August 5, 1994 | Unreleased | Arcade CD-ROM² |
| Super Real Mahjong PIV | Naxat Soft | December 17, 1993 | Unreleased | Super CD-ROM² |
| Super Real Mahjong P.V Custom | Naxat Soft | March 3, 1995 | Unreleased | Arcade CD-ROM² |
| Super Real Mahjong Special | Naxat Soft | December 18, 1992 | Unreleased | Super CD-ROM² |
| Super Schwarzchild | Kogado Studio | December 6, 1991 | Unreleased | CD-ROM² |
| Super Schwarzschild 2 | Kogado Studio | December 4, 1992 | Unreleased | Super CD-ROM² |
| Super Star Soldier | NEC (US); Hudson Soft (JP) | July 6, 1990 | March 1991 | HuCard |
| Super Volleyball | NEC (US); Video System (JP) | February 7, 1990 | September 1990 | HuCard |
| Susano-Ō Densetsu | Hudson Soft | April 27, 1989 | Unreleased | HuCard |
| Sword Master | Right Stuff | November 19, 1993 | Unreleased | Super CD-ROM² |
| Syd Mead's Terraforming •Terraforming^{JP} | TTI (US); Naxat Soft (JP) | May 1, 1992 | May 1993 | Super CD-ROM² |
| Sylphia | Tonkin House | October 22, 1993 | Unreleased | Super CD-ROM² |
| Taidaima Yūsha Boshūchū | Human Entertainment | November 26, 1993 | Unreleased | Super CD-ROM² |
| Taiheiki | Intec | December 13, 1991 | Unreleased | CD-ROM² |
| Takeda Shingen | Aicom | July 28, 1989 | Unreleased | HuCard |
| Takin' it to the Hoop •USA Pro Basketball^{JP} | NEC (US); Aicom (JP) | December 1, 1989 | March 15, 1990 | HuCard |
| TaleSpin | NEC | Unreleased | July 1991 | HuCard |
| Tanjō: Debut | NEC Avenue | September 22, 1994 | Unreleased | Arcade CD-ROM² |
| Tatsu no Ko Fighter | Tonkin House | October 20, 1989 | Unreleased | HuCard |
| TATSUJIN | Taito | July 24, 1992 | Unreleased | HuCard |
| Tecmo World Cup: Super Soccer | Media Rings | December 4, 1992 | Unreleased | Super CD-ROM² |
| Tenchi Muyō! Ryōōki | NEC Avenue | May 26, 1995 | Unreleased | Super CD-ROM² |
| Tenchi wo Kurau | NEC Avenue | June 17, 1994 | Unreleased | Super CD-ROM² |
| Tengai Makyō: Fūun Kabukiden | Hudson Soft | July 10, 1993 | Unreleased | Super CD-ROM² |
| Tengai Makyō: Ziria | Hudson Soft | June 30, 1989 | Unreleased | CD-ROM² |
| Tengai Makyō II: Manji Maru | Hudson Soft | March 26, 1992 | Unreleased | Super CD-ROM² |
| Tenshi no Uta | Telenet Japan | October 25, 1991 | Unreleased | Super CD-ROM² |
| Tenshi no Uta II | Telenet Japan | March 26, 1993 | Unreleased | Super CD-ROM² |
| Terra Cresta II: Mandler's Counterattack | Nichibutsu | November 27, 1992 | Unreleased | HuCard |
| Thunder Blade | NEC Avenue | December 7, 1990 | Unreleased | HuCard |
| Tiger Road •Tora he no Michi^{JP} | NEC (US); Victor Musical Industries (JP) | February 23, 1990 | October 1990 | HuCard |
| Time Cruise •Time Cruise II^{JP} | TTI (US); Face (JP) | November 8, 1991 | December 1992 | HuCard |
| Timeball •Blodia^{JP} | NEC (US); Hudson Soft (JP) | February 23, 1990 | July 1990 | HuCard |
| Titan | Naxat Soft | March 15, 1991 | Unreleased | HuCard |
| Toilet Kids | Media Rings | March 6, 1992 | Unreleased | HuCard |
| Tokimeki Memorial | Konami | May 27, 1994 | Unreleased | Super CD-ROM² |
| Top o Nerae! GunBuster Vol. 1 | Riverhillsoft | June 25, 1992 | Unreleased | Super CD-ROM² |
| Top o Nerae! GunBuster Vol. 2 | Riverhillsoft | March 26, 1993 | Unreleased | Super CD-ROM² |
| Toshi Tensō Keikaku Eternal City | Naxat Soft | April 12, 1991 | Unreleased | HuCard |
| The Tower of Druaga | Namco | June 25, 1992 | Unreleased | HuCard |
| Toy Shop Boys | Victor Musical Industries | December 14, 1990 | Unreleased | HuCard |
| Travelers!: Densetsu o Buttobase | Victor Entertainment | December 29, 1994 | Unreleased | Super CD-ROM² |
| Travel Epuru | Telenet Japan | September 4, 1992 | Unreleased | Super CD-ROM² |
| Tricky Kick •Tricky^{JP} | IGS | July 6, 1991 | March 1991 | HuCard |
| Tsuppari Ōzumō Heisei Ban | Naxat Soft | February 19, 1993 | Unreleased | HuCard |
| Tsuru Teruto no Jissen Kabushiki Buy Game | Intec | November 10, 1989 | Unreleased | HuCard |
| Turrican | Accolade | Unreleased | November 1991 | HuCard |
| The TV Show | Right Stuff | September 29, 1995 | Unreleased | Super CD-ROM² |
| TV Sports Basketball | NEC (US); Victor Musical Industries (JP) | April 29, 1993 | June 1991 | HuCard |
| TV Sports: Football | NEC (US); Victor Musical Industries (JP) | March 29, 1991 | December 1990 | HuCard |
| TV Sports Hockey •TV Sports Ice Hockey^{JP} | NEC (US); Victor Musical Industries (JP) | April 29, 1993 | September 1991 | HuCard |
| Uchū Senkan Yamato | Human Entertainment | December 22, 1992 | Unreleased | Super CD-ROM² |
| Ultra Box No. 2 | Victor Musical Industries | September 28, 1990 | Unreleased | CD-ROM² |
| Ultra Box No. 3 | Victor Musical Industries | December 28, 1990 | Unreleased | CD-ROM² |
| Ultra Box No. 4 | Victor Musical Industries | May 24, 1991 | Unreleased | CD-ROM² |
| Ultra Box No. 5 | Victor Musical Industries | September 27, 1991 | Unreleased | CD-ROM² |
| Ultra Box No. 6 | Victor Musical Industries | January 31, 1992 | Unreleased | CD-ROM² |
| Ultra Box Premiere Issue | Victor Musical Industries | June 15, 1990 | Unreleased | CD-ROM² |
| Urusei Yatsura: Stay With You | Hudson Soft | June 29, 1990 | Unreleased | CD-ROM² |
| Valis II | NEC (US); Telenet Japan (JP) | June 23, 1989 | May 23, 1990 | CD-ROM² |
| Valis III | NEC (US); Telenet Japan (JP) | September 7, 1990 | March 1992 | CD-ROM² |
| Valis IV | Telenet Japan | August 23, 1991 | Unreleased | CD-ROM² |
| Valis: The Fantasm Soldier | Telenet Japan | March 19, 1992 | Unreleased | Super CD-ROM² |
| Valkyrie no Densetsu | Namco | August 9, 1990 | Unreleased | HuCard |
| Vasteel | Working Designs (US); Human Entertainment (JP) | December 20, 1990 | April 1993 | CD-ROM² |
| Vasteel 2 | Human Entertainment | July 8, 1994 | Unreleased | Arcade CD-ROM² |
| Veigues Tactical Gladiator •Veigues^{JP} | NEC (US); Victor Musical Industries (JP) | June 15, 1990 | December 1990 | HuCard |
| Victory Run | NEC (US); Hudson Soft (JP) | December 28, 1987 | August 29, 1989 | HuCard |
| Vigilante | NEC (US); Irem (JP) | January 14, 1989 | October 1989 | HuCard |
| Virgin Dream | Tokuma Shoten Intermedia | May 31, 1996 | Unreleased | Super CD-ROM² |
| Volfied | Taito | December 27, 1989 | Unreleased | HuCard |
| Wai Wai Mahjong | Video System | June 19, 1989 | Unreleased | HuCard |
| Wallaby!! | Masaya | December 14, 1990 | Unreleased | HuCard |
| Where in the World is Carmen Sandiego? | Pack-In-Video | March 30, 1990 | Unreleased | CD-ROM² |
| Winning Shot | Data East | March 3, 1989 | Unreleased | HuCard |
| Wizardry I & II | Naxat Soft | July 23, 1993 | Unreleased | Super CD-ROM² |
| Wizardry III & IV | Naxat Soft | March 4, 1994 | Unreleased | Super CD-ROM² |
| Wizardry V | Naxat Soft | September 25, 1992 | Unreleased | Super CD-ROM² |
| Wonder Momo | Namco | April 21, 1989 | Unreleased | HuCard |
| World Class Baseball •Power League^{JP} | NEC (US); Hudson Soft (JP) | June 24, 1988 | November 1989 | HuCard |
| World Court Tennis •Pro Tennis: World Court^{JP} | NEC (US); Namco (JP) | August 11, 1988 | December 1989 | HuCard |
| World Heroes 2 | Hudson Soft | June 4, 1994 | Unreleased | Arcade CD-ROM² |
| World Jockey | Namco | September 20, 1991 | Unreleased | HuCard |
| World Sports Competition •Power Sports^{JP} | NEC (US); Hudson Soft (JP) | October 10, 1992 | February 1993 | HuCard |
| Wrestle Angels: Double Impact | NEC Home Electronics | May 19, 1995 | Unreleased | Super CD-ROM² |
| Xak I & II | Telenet Japan | December 25, 1992 | Unreleased | Super CD-ROM² |
| Xak III: The Eternal Recurrence | NEC Home Electronics | September 30, 1994 | Unreleased | Super CD-ROM² |
| Xevious: Fardraut Saga | Namco | June 29, 1990 | Unreleased | HuCard |
| Yamamura Misa Suspense: Kizenka Kyō Ezara Satsujin Jiken | Naxat Soft | March 6, 1992 | Unreleased | Super CD-ROM² |
| Yami no Ketsuzoku | Naxat Soft | December 17, 1993 | Unreleased | Super CD-ROM² |
| Yawara! | Sofix | October 1, 1992 | Unreleased | Super CD-ROM² |
| Yawara! 2 | Sofix | September 23, 1994 | Unreleased | Super CD-ROM² |
| Yo, Bro (Note: Also Yo Bro and Yo' Bro on official packaging.) | NEC | Unreleased | September 1991 | HuCard |
| Yōkai Dochuki | Namco | February 5, 1988 | Unreleased | HuCard |
| Yūyū Jinsei | Hudson Soft | April 22, 1988 | Unreleased | HuCard |
| Yū Yū Hakusho: Yami Shōbu!! Ankoku Bujutsu Kai | Banpresto | September 30, 1993 | Unreleased | Super CD-ROM² |
| Ys: Book I & II •Ys I & II^{JP} | NEC (US); Hudson Soft (JP) | December 21, 1989 | May 1990 | CD-ROM² |
| Ys III: Wanderers from Ys | NEC (US); Hudson Soft (JP) | March 22, 1991 | November 1991 | CD-ROM² |
| Ys IV: The Dawn of Ys | Hudson Soft | December 22, 1993 | Unreleased | Super CD-ROM² |
| Zan: Kagerō no Toki | Taito | December 27, 1991 | Unreleased | CD-ROM² |
| Zero4 Champ | Media Rings | March 8, 1991 | Unreleased | HuCard |
| Zero4 Champ II | Media Rings | March 5, 1993 | Unreleased | Super CD-ROM² |
| Zero Wing | Naxat Soft | September 18, 1992 | Unreleased | CD-ROM² |
| Zipang | Pack-In-Video | December 14, 1990 | Unreleased | HuCard |

== Other software ==
=== Limited Editions/Promotional Giveaways ===
| Main title | Distributor | Release date | | Format | | | |
|---|---|---|---|---|---|---|---|
| Main title | Distributor | Bomberman '93 Special Version | Hudson Soft | Format | 1993 | Unreleased | HuCard |
| Bomberman '94 Special Version | Hudson Soft | 1994 | Unreleased | HuCard | | | |
| Bomberman '94 Taikenban | Hudson Soft | 1994 | Unreleased | HuCard | | | |
| Bomberman Users Battle | Hudson Soft | 1990 | Unreleased | HuCard | | | |
| Final Soldier Special Version | Hudson Soft | 1991 | Unreleased | HuCard | | | |
| Gunhed Special Version | Hudson Soft | 1990 | Unreleased | HuCard | | | |
| Soldier Blade Special: Caravan Stage | Hudson Soft | 1992 | Unreleased | HuCard | | | |
| Summer Carnival '92: Alzadick | Naxat Soft | 1992 | Unreleased | Super CD-ROM² | | | |
| Summer Carnival '93: Nexzr Special | Naxat Soft | July 23, 1993 | Unreleased | Super CD-ROM² | | | |
| Tengai Makyō: Deden no Den | Hudson Soft | 1994 | Unreleased | Super CD-ROM² | | | |

=== Non-game software and demodiscs ===
| Main title | Distributor | Release date | | Format |
| Main title | Distributor | Japan | North America | Format |
|---|---|---|---|---|
| 4 in 1 Super CD | Hudson Soft | Unreleased | October 10, 1992 | CD-ROM² |
| Artist Tool | NEC Home Electronics | September 29, 1989 | Unreleased | HuCard |
| Cosmic Fantasy: Visual Collection | Telenet Japan | February 12, 1993 | Unreleased | CD-ROM² |
| Develo Magazine Vol. 1 | Tokuma Shoten Intermedia | 1996 | Unreleased | CD-ROM² |
| Duo Comic: Bakuretsu Hunter | Media Works Inc. | June 30, 1994 | Unreleased | Super CD-ROM² |
| Galaxy Fräulein Yuna HuVIDEO (Note: Bundled with a 1995 rerelease of Galaxy Fräulein Yuna.) | Hudson Soft | June 18, 1995 | Unreleased | Super CD-ROM² |
| PC Engine Fan: Special CD-ROM Vol. 1 | Tokuma Shoten Intermedia | 1996 | Unreleased | CD-ROM² |
| PC Engine Hyper Catalog | Alfa System | 1992 | Unreleased | Super CD-ROM² |
| PC Engine Hyper Catalog 1993 Spring | Alfa System | 1993 | Unreleased | Super CD-ROM² |
| PC Engine Hyper Catalog 1993 Summer | Alfa System | 1993 | Unreleased | Super CD-ROM² |
| PC Engine Hyper Catalog 1993 Winter | Alfa System | 1993 | Unreleased | Super CD-ROM² |
| PC Engine Hyper Catalog 1994 Spring | Alfa System | 1994 | Unreleased | Super CD-ROM² |
| PC Engine Hyper Catalog 1994 Summer | Alfa System | 1994 | Unreleased | Super CD-ROM² |
| ROM² Karaoke Vol. 1 | NEC Avenue | October 27, 1989 | Unreleased | CD-ROM² |
| ROM² Karaoke Vol. 1: Sutekini Standard | Victor Musical Industries | March 30, 1990 | Unreleased | CD-ROM² |
| ROM² Karaoke Vol. 2 | NEC Avenue | October 27, 1989 | Unreleased | CD-ROM² |
| ROM² Karaoke Vol. 2: Nattoku Idol | Victor Musical Industries | March 30, 1990 | Unreleased | CD-ROM² |
| ROM² Karaoke Vol. 3 | NEC Avenue | December 20, 1989 | Unreleased | CD-ROM² |
| ROM² Karaoke Vol. 3: Yatsubashi Band | Victor Musical Industries | April 6, 1990 | Unreleased | CD-ROM² |
| ROM² Karaoke Vol. 4 | NEC Avenue | January 19, 1990 | Unreleased | CD-ROM² |
| ROM² Karaoke Vol. 4: Choito Otona!? | Victor Musical Industries | April 6, 1990 | Unreleased | CD-ROM² |
| ROM² Karaoke Vol. 5 | NEC Avenue | April 20, 1990 | Unreleased | CD-ROM² |
| ROM² Karaoke Vol. 5: Karaoke Makunōchi | Victor Musical Industries | April 6, 1990 | Unreleased | CD-ROM² |
| Snatcher CD-ROMantic: Pilot Disk | Konami | August 7, 1992 | Unreleased | Super CD-ROM² |
| Super CD-ROM² Taiken Soft-shū | Hudson Soft | December 13, 1991 | Unreleased | CD-ROM² |
| Valis: Visual Collection | Telenet Japan | February 19, 1993 | Unreleased | CD-ROM² |

=== Unlicensed games ===
The following games were released without the approval of NEC nor TTI.

| Main title | Distributor | Release date | Format |
|---|---|---|---|
| Atlantean | Aetherbyte Studios | August 8, 2014 | HuCard |
| AV Poker: World Gambler | Hacker International | 1992 | HuCard |
| AV Tanjō | Hacker International | February 24, 1995 | Game Express CD |
| Bikini Girls | Excite Software Corp. | 1993 | CD-ROM² |
| Bishōjo Jyanshi Idol Pai | Hacker International | November 10, 1995 | Game Express CD |
| Body Conquest II | Hacker International | 1993 | HuCard |
| CD Bishōjo Pachinko 4 Sisters | Hacker International | January 5, 1995 | Game Express CD |
| CD Hanafuda Bishōjo Gambler | Hacker International | November 25, 1994 | Game Express CD |
| CD Mahjong Bishōjo Tyuushinha | Hacker International | July 30, 1993 | Game Express CD |
| CD Pachisuro Bishōjo Gambler | Hacker International | July 29, 1994 | Game Express CD |
| Crazy Hospital: Fushigi No Kuni No Tenshi | Asia Soft Lab | March 10, 1995 | Super CD-ROM² |
| FX Unit Yuki: The Henshin Engine | SaruPro | April 12, 2018 | Super CD-ROM² |
| Hawaiian Island Girls | Excite Software Corp. | 1993 | CD-ROM² |
| Hi-Leg Fantasy | Hacker International | September 16, 1994 | Game Express CD |
| Hypernova Blast | MindRec | September 8, 2014 | Super CD-ROM² |
| Idol Hanafuda Fan Club | Hacker International | 1991 | HuCard |
| CD-ROM² game)|Implode | MindRec | September 1, 2002 | Super CD-ROM² |
| CD-ROM² game)|Insanity | Aetherbyte Studios | 2009 | Super CD-ROM² |
| J Thunder | Unknown | 1990 | Super CD-ROM² |
| Jessie Jaeger in Cleopatra's Curse | Bold Game Studio | January 2021 | Super CD-ROM² |
| Kyūkyoku Mah-jong: Idol Graphic | Hacker International | 1992 | HuCard |
| Kyūkyoku Mah-jong II: Super Idol Graphic | Hacker International | 1992 | HuCard |
| Lady Sword | Hacker International | 1992 | HuCard |
| Local Girls of Hawaii | Excite Software Corp. | 1993 | CD-ROM² |
| Meteor Blaster DX | MindRec | August 1, 2004 | Super CD-ROM² |
| Mysterious Song | Frozen Utopia | August 27, 2012 | Super CD-ROM² |
| PC Pachi-Slot: Idol Gambler | Hacker International | 1992 | HuCard |
| Pyramid Plunder | Aetherbyte Studios | March 2013 | Super CD-ROM² |
| Quiz Tōkō Shashin | Hacker International | December 1992 | HuCard |
| Revival Chase | Revival Games | January 2013 | Super CD-ROM² |
| Shiawase Usagi | B-Project | 1995 | Super CD-ROM² |
| Shiawase Usagi 2 | B-Project | August 1, 1995 | Super CD-ROM² |
| Shinsetsu Shiawase Usagi | B-Project | September 30, 1995 | Super CD-ROM² |
| Shinsetsu Shiawase Usagi 2 | B-Project | February 25, 1996 | Super CD-ROM² |
| Shinsetsu Shiawase Usagi F | B-Project | September 10, 1997 | Super CD-ROM² |
| Strip Fighter II | Hacker International | 1993 | HuCard |
