= List of shoot 'em up games =

List "shoot 'em up" video games

A "shoot 'em up", also known as a "shmup" or "STG" (the common Japanese abbreviation for "shooting games"), is a game in which the protagonist combats a large number of enemies by shooting at them while dodging their fire. The controlling player must rely primarily on reaction times to succeed.

== Fixed shooters ==
Games where the player stays at a fixed line on the screen.

- Beamrider
- Centipede
  - Millipede
- Cosmo Gang the Video
- Galaxian / Galaga series
- Moon Cresta
- Space Invaders series

== Side-scrolling shooters ==
- Air Buster
- Air Zonk
  - Super Air Zonk
- Aldynes
- Atomic Robo-Kid
- Barunba
- Battle Chopper
- Bio Hazard Battle
- BioMetal
- BlaZeon
- Bouken Danshaku Don
- Cho Aniki series
- Coryoon - Child of Dragon
- Cotton series
- Darius series
- Dead Moon (video game)
- Download
  - Download 2
- Earth Defense Force
- Eliminate Down
- Fantasy Zone
  - Fantasy Zone II: The Tears of Opa-Opa
  - Super Fantasy Zone
- Forgotten Worlds
- Gate of Thunder
- Gley Lancer
- Gradius series
- Gynoug
- Hana Tāka Daka!?
- Harmful Park
- Heavy Unit
- Hellfire
- Hyper Duel
- Hyper Dyne Side Arms
- Ironclad (video game)
- Keio Flying Squadron
- Kiaidan 00
- L-Dis
- Last Resort
- Lords of Thunder
- Macross series (some games)
- Magical Chase
- Metamor Jupiter
- Mystic Riders
- Ordyne
- Otomedius
  - Otomedius Excellent
- Over Horizon
- Parodius series
- Phalanx
- Prehistoric Isle
  - Prehistoric Isle 2
- Psychosis
- R-Type series
- Rabio Lepus
- Rayxanber
  - Rayxanber II
  - Rayxanber III
- Sigma Star Saga
- Sinistron (video game)
- Spriggan Mark 2: Re-Terraform Project
  - Spriggan Powered
- Steel Empire
- Syd Mead's TerraForming
- Thunder Force series
- Trouble Shooter
  - Battle Mania: Daiginjō
- Uchū no Kishi: Tekkaman Blade
- U.N. Squadron
- Zombie Nation

== Vertically scrolling shooters ==
- 194X series
- Acrobat Mission
- Aero Fighters series
- Aleste series
- Alzadick
- Axelay
- Blazing Lazers
- Burning Angels
- Chōshin Heiki Zeroigar
- Cresta series
- Crisis Force
- Cyber Core
- Dangerous Seed
- Dragon Spirit
- Final Soldier
- Firepower 2000
- Flying Hero
- Ginga Fukei Densetsu Sapphire
- God Panic: Shijō Saikyō Gundan
- Grind Stormer
- The Guardian Legend
- Gun Nac
- Gun.Smoke
- Ikaruga
- Image Fight
  - Image Fight II: Operation Deepstriker
- Iridion II
- MUSHA
- NEXZR
- Override
- Psychic Storm
- Psycho Chaser
- Radiant Silvergun
- Raiden series
- River Raid
- Seirei Senshi Spriggan
- Soldier Blade
- Space Invaders '95
- Star Parodier
- Steam-Heart's
- Strike Gunner S.T.G
- Summer Carnival '92: Recca
- Super Star Soldier
- Sylphia
- Terra Diver
- Touhou Project series
- Toy Shop Boys
- Truxton
  - Truxton II
- TwinBee series
- Twinkle Star Sprites
- Undead Line
- Zanac

== Multidirectional shooters ==
Games that allow the player to shoot and move towards differently directions.

- Armada
- Bangai-O
- Bionicle Heroes (GBA version)
- Dead Connection
- Deae Tonosama Appare Ichiban
- Granada
- Guardian Force
- Ikari Warriors
  - Victory Road
  - Ikari III: The Rescue
- Last Alert
- Märchen Maze
- Metal Stoker
- Mystic Formula
- Pocky & Rocky series
- Shock Troopers
  - Shock Troopers: 2nd Squad
- Soldiers of Fortune
- Sub-Terrania
- Super Smash T.V.
- Thunder Force
  - Thunder Force II
- Zombies Ate My Neighbors
- Xeno Crisis
- Trax
- Twinkle Tale

== Run and gun platformers ==
Games that combine shooting with platforming elements.

- Alien Soldier
- Assault Suit series
- Contra series
- Demon's World
- Earthworm Jim series
- Front Mission series
- G.I. Joe video games
- Gunstar Heroes
  - Gunstar Super Heroes
- Gunners Heaven
- Journey to Silius
- Mega Man series
  - Mega Man X series
- Metal Slug series
- Metal Warriors
- Ranger X
- Rendering Ranger: R2
- Rolling Thunder
  - Rolling Thunder 2
  - Rolling Thunder 3
- Shockman series
- Sunset Riders
- Vectorman
  - Vectorman 2

== See also ==
- List of first-person shooters
- List of third-person shooters
- List of vehicular combat games
