= Coryoon: Child of Dragon =

1991 video game

Coryoon
- Developer: Naxat Soft
- Publisher: Naxat Soft
- Designer: Yoshiharu Takaoka
- Programmer: Yoshiharu Takaoka
- Artist: Kenji Mori
- Composers: Daisuke Morishima; Hisashi Matsushita
- Platform: PC Engine
- Release: JP: November 29, 1991
- Genre: Horizontal-scrolling shooter
- Mode: Single-player

Coryoon (Note: Japanese: コリューン, Hepburn: Koryūn) is a side-scrolling shoot 'em up video game released in 1991 for the PC Engine by Naxat Soft.

== Gameplay ==
Coryoon is a side-scrolling shoot 'em up game.

== Development and release ==
Coryoon was released by Naxat Soft for the PC Engine.

== Reception ==
Reception

Review scores
Publication	Score
Consoles +	89%
Famitsu	6/10, 5/10, 6/10, 5/10
Gekkan PC Engine	70/100, 75/100, 75/100, 70/100, 75/100
Génération 4	90%
Joystick	84%
Consolemania	91/100
Hippon Super!	5/10

Coryoon was met with generally favorable reviews. It received a score of 22.26 out of 30 in a 1993 readers' poll conducted by PC Engine Fan, ranking among PC Engine titles at the number 149 spot.
