= Kaze Kiri =

1994 hack and slash video game

- Developer(s): Naxat Soft
- Publisher(s): Naxat Soft
- Director(s): Kazuhiko Inoue
- Producer(s): Kazuhiko Inoue
- Designer(s): Kazuhiko Inoue; Manabu Sakai; Masanori Iizuka
- Programmer(s): Yoshinori Hironaka
- Artist(s): Kazuhiko Inoue; Manabu Sakai; Masanori Iizuka
- Writer(s): Kazuhiko Inoue
- Composer(s): Daisuke Morishima
- Platform(s): PC Engine CD-ROM²
- Release: JP: April 28, 1994
- Genre(s): Hack and slash
- Mode(s): Single-player

Kaze Kiri, (Note: "Kaze Kiri" (風霧, lit. "Wind Slicer")) also known as Kaze Kiri: Ninja Action, is a 1994 Japanese video game for the PC Engine CD-ROM² system. Developed and published by Naxat Soft the game was released only in Japan. It is a side scrolling ninja game set in feudal Japan.

== Gameplay ==
Gameplay screenshot.

Kaze Kiri is a side scrolling hack and slash game that has nineteen stages in total.

== Plot ==
Set in Japan during Edo jidai, the game begins when Shizuhime, the daughter of a warlord named Yoshikage is kidnapped by the ninja Hiei. Yoshikage sends the ninja Kaze Kiri to retrieve his daughter. Both Hiei and Kaze Kiri were trained by the same master, Gembu, and are rivals to each other.

== Development ==
The game was developed by Naxat Soft, and was directed by Kazuhiko Inoue who also wrote the story.

The game features various graphical effects in the background, including parallax scrolling, and water transparencies.

== Release ==
The game was released in Japan on April 28, 1994 for the PC Engine CD-ROM². The physical game has since gone on to become a rare and valuable item among game collectors.

== Reception ==
Kaze Kiri received a mediocre score of 23/40 from Famitsu. Nick Rox writing in GameFan praised the game and recommended playing it. He compared the game as a combination of Ninja Warriors, Dracula X, and Strider. He praised the graphical effects in the levels, the size of the enemies, as well as the character animations. He explained the only flaw in the game was the music, which he felt was only adequate.

Retrospective reviews were also positive. French magazine Retro Game heavily praised the game. Retro Gamer magazine highlighted it as one of the most memorable games about Japanese warriors, opining it "perhaps doesn't quite live up to the hype generated by its rare status and price tag - its gameplay will lack variety for some - but is and undeniably stylish game that deserves greater exposure."

== See also ==
- Ninja Hayate
- The Legend of Kage
