= L-Dis =

1991 video game

- Developer: Dual Corporation
- Publisher: Masaya
- Director: Yasumasa Shirakura
- Producer: Toshirou Tsuchida
- Designer: Tetsuya Yamamoto
- Programmer: Tsutomu Takano
- Artist: Norio Makino
- Writer: Norio Makino
- Composer: Atsuhiro Motoyama
- Platform: PC Engine CD-ROM²
- Release: JP: April 5, 1991
- Genre: Horizontal-scrolling shooter
- Mode: Single-player

L-Dis (Note: Japanese: エルディス, Hepburn: Erudisu) is a 1991 side-scrolling shoot 'em up video game published by Masaya Games for the NEC PC Engine CD-ROM².

== Gameplay ==
Gameplay screenshot

L-Dis is a side-scrolling shoot 'em up game.

== Development and release ==
In 2009, the game was released for the Nintendo Wii's Virtual Console.

== Reception ==
Reception

Review scores
Publication	Score
Famitsu	6/10, 7/10, 7/10, 6/10
Gekkan PC Engine	75/100, 75/100, 80/100, 75/100, 80/100
Génération 4	90%
Joystick	75%
Marukatsu PC Engine	8/10, 6/10, 7/10, 8/10
Electric Brain	70%
Hippon Super!	7/10

L-Dis received generally favorable reviews. The Japanese publication Micom BASIC Magazine ranked the game seventh in popularity in its July 1991 issue, and it received a score of 21.89 out of 30 in a 1993 readers' poll conducted by PC Engine Fan, ranking among PC Engine titles at the number 174 spot.
