= Aldynes =

1991 video game

- Developer: Produce!
- Publisher: Hudson Soft
- Director: Shinji Imada
- Producer: Masaki Kobayashi
- Designer: Jun Kusaka
- Programmer: Toshiyuki Suzuki
- Composer: Keita Hoshi
- Platform: SuperGrafx
- Release: JP: February 22, 1991
- Genre: Horizontal-scrolling shooter
- Mode: Single-player

Aldynes (オルディネス), full title Aldynes: The Misson Code for Rage Crisis, is a horizontally scrolling shooter developed by Produce! and released on February 22, 1991, for the SuperGrafx only for Japan. The game was made available on the PlayStation Network on February 16, 2011.

== Gameplay ==
There are 7 stages a player has to win in order to complete the game.

== Plot ==
In the year 2020, Earth suffers from a devastating alien invasion. A large mechanical planetoid suddenly emerges from space and attacks the cities of Earth without reason or communication. With all defenses annihilated, the United Nations corresponds with NASA to make a powerful space fighter known as the SWA-402 Ortega, but the fighter fails to end the war. One of the Ortega pilots, known only by his call sign Fox-A, is killed in action. His bereaved girlfriend Hiroko soon discovers his involvement in the Pandora Project which houses the Ortega's successor: the SDE-201 Aldynes. As the invaders attack the air force housing the nearly complete Aldynes, Hiroko hijacks one of the ships and throws herself into battle in hopes of getting revenge.

== Reception ==
Reception

Review scores
Publication	Score
Consoles +	93%
Famitsu	7/10, 6/10, 7/10, 5/10
Gekkan PC Engine	90/100, 85/100, 85/100, 85/100, 85/100
Génération 4	81%
Joystick	90%
Marukatsu PC Engine	6/10, 7/10, 7/10, 7/10
Player One	87%
Tilt	18/20
Hippon Super!	7/10
Micro News	5/6
Super Gaming	9/10, 8/10, 9/10

Aldynes received generally favorable reviews from critics. The game received a score of 19.56 out of 30 in a 1993 readers' poll conducted by PC Engine Fan, ranking among SuperGrafxand PC Engine titles at the number 360 spot.
