= King of Casino =

1990 video game

- Developer: Algorithm Institute (Note: Graphical design by Animation 20)
- Publishers: JP: Victor Musical Industries; NA: NEC
- Director: Toshiyuki Nagai
- Producer: Harunobu Komori
- Designer: Nobuo Shimizu
- Programmer: Masato Nagai
- Composer: Hirotoshi Suzuki
- Platform: TurboGrafx-16
- Release: JP: March 27, 1990; NA: 1990
- Genre: Casino
- Modes: Single-player, multiplayer (Note: Up to five players via TurboTap)

King of Casino (Note: Japanese: キング オブ カジノ, Hepburn: Kingu obu Kajino) is a 1990 gambling simulation video game developed by Algorithm Institute, published in Japan by Victor Musical Industries and in North America by NEC for the TurboGrafx-16. The game sees the players go to different casinos with $10000, using the money to participate in poker, blackjack, roulette, slot machines and keno, in order to win $10 million. After selecting one of the three playing modes (normal, fast or party), there are 15 casinos with slight differences to choose on a town map. Inside the casino the games itself are started by clicking on one of the gambling tables. It received generally favourable reception from critics, most of which reviewed it as an import title.

== Gameplay ==
Gameplay screenshot.

King of Casino is a gambling simulation game, where one or five players go to different casinos and participate in poker, blackjack, roulette, slot machines and keno. There are fifteen casinos to choose on a town map, each with slight differences, and the player can choose to start any of the games once inside the casino by clicking on one of the gambling tables. The player is given $10,000 and the main goal is to win $10 million, but the game ends if a player loses all the money.

== Development and release ==
King of Casino was developed by Algorithm Institute, with graphical design by Animation 20. It was directed by Toshiyuki Nagai and produced by Harunobu Komori. Nobuo Shimizu acted as designer, with Masato Nagai serving as programmer, while the music was composed by Hirotoshi "Hiroshi" Suzuki. The game was first slated for a March 23, 1990 launch window, but was released by Victor Musical Industries on March 27 instead. The title was eventually published by NEC in North America.

== Reception ==
Reception

Review scores
Publication	Score
Aktueller Software Markt	6/12
Gekkan PC Engine	70/100, 75/100, 75/100, 75/100, 70/100
Génération 4	70%
Joystick	70%
Tilt	13/20
VideoGames & Computer Entertainment	6/10
Power Play	24%

King of Casino received generally favourable reception from critics, most of which reviewed it as an import title. Génération 4's Philippe Querleux wrote "As someone who loves jackpots and poker, I love this game, and even I'm going to treat myself to it." Joystick's Jean-Marc Demoly labelled it as a "well-made" game, highlighting its original production and audiovisual presentation. Tilt's Alain Huyghues-Lacour concurred with Demoly regarding the game's presentation but also noted its attention to detail, visuals and sound effects.

Aktueller Software Markt's Sandra Alter agreed with both Demoly and Huyghues-Lacour, but commented that "there is one thing this game cannot offer: the high society that usually hangs out in the casino, trembling player hands, and the unbelievable crackling that is so often in the air in such houses." Power Play's Henrik Fisch commended the graphics but panned the music. VideoGames & Computer Entertainment's Clayton Walnum gave positive remarks to the visuals on each game, but felt mixed in regards to the visuals and playability, stating that "If you've got a TurboGrafx-16 and want a gambling simulation, King of Casino is okay. It's not, however, the kind of quality program that TurboGrafx-16 owners have come to expect."
