= Rabio Lepus =

1987 video game

- Developer: V-System (Note: Ported to PC Engine by Minakuchi Engineering.)
- Publishers: JP: V-System; NA: Bally Midway
- Platforms: Arcade, PC Engine
- Release: Arcade: JP: September 1987; NA: February 1988; PC Engine: JP: October 19, 1990
- Genre: Scrolling shooter
- Modes: Single-player, multiplayer

Rabio Lepus (Note: Japanese: ラビオレプス, Hepburn: Rabio Repusu; known in North America as Rabbit Punch) is a 1987 horizontally scrolling shooter video game developed and published by V-System for arcades. It was released in Japan in September 1987 and in North America by Bally Midway in February 1988 as Rabbit Punch. An NEC PC Engine port, Rabio Lepus Special, was released in 1990. Hamster Corporation released the game for the PlayStation 2 as part of the Oretachi Gēsen Zoku series in 2006, as well as part of the Arcade Archives series for the Nintendo Switch and PlayStation 4 in July 2022.

== Gameplay ==
Rabio Lepus is a horizontal-scrolling shooter game. It follows two colorful robotic rabbits named Rabio and Lepus as they battle waves of enemies including golems, metallic cats, and demonic creatures. Rabio and Lepus can unleash an infinite stream of bullets, but powerful missile attacks are finite and must be replenished. When in close contact with enemies or objects, Rabio and Lepus can punch to damage opponents in close range or destroy carrot canisters for extra points. A tanuki power-up allows them to temporarily become invincible and destroy enemies on contact.

== Reception ==
Reception

Review scores
Publication	Score
ACE	849/1000
Computer and Video Games	79%
Famitsu	7/10, 7/10, 7/10, 5/10
Gekkan PC Engine	80/100, 90/100, 80/100, 85/100, 75/100
Génération 4	8/10
Joystick	87%
Player One	88%
Raze	64%
Tilt	15/20
Zero	81/100
Game Zone	3/5
Micro News	5/5
Power Play	69%

Award
Publication	Award
Gamest Mook (1998)	Best Shooting Award 9th, Annual Hit Game 30th

In Japan, Game Machine listed Rabio Lepus on their November 15, 1987 issue as being the fifth most-popular arcade game for the previous two weeks. Computer and Video Games' Clare Edgeley found the game to be an entertaining and playable shoot 'em up, praising the graphics for the detailed backgrounds, but noted that later stages become more labyrinthine and difficult to overcome. Gamest regarded it to be a well-crafted game and awarded it several prizes at the second annual "Gamest Awards", taking 9th place in the "Best Shooting Award" and 30th place in the "Annual Hit Game". Hardcore Gaming 101's Kurt Kalata stated that it was a solid entry in the shooter genre but noted that flaws kept it behind competing shooters, citing the cramped stages and surprise ambushes by enemy swarms. Jun Sasaki of Akiba PC Hotline! deemed it to be a unique game.

Rabio Lepus Special received generally favorable reviews. Japanese publication Micom BASIC Magazine ranked the game thirteenth in popularity in its January 1991 issue, and it received a score of 20.33 out of 30 in a 1993 readers' poll conducted by PC Engine Fan, ranking among PC Engine titles at the number 316 spot.
