= Metal Stoker =

1991 video game

- Developer: Sankindo
- Publisher: Face
- Director: Hiroyuki Nasu
- Programmers: Mikiya Nagasawa; Noboru Maruyama; Masayuki Akiyama
- Artists: Hiroyuki Nasu; Hiroki Ogawa
- Composers: Hiroto Saitou; Nozomu Takahashi
- Platform: PC Engine
- Release: 1991
- Genre: Multidirectional shooter
- Mode: Single-player

Metal Stoker (Japanese: メタルストーカー) is a multidirectional shooter developed by Sankindo and published by Face. The game was released in Japan for the PC Engine in 1991.

== Plot ==
A female pilot is tasked with completing a VR training exercise and mastering the use of a prototype tank called the CS-05 Metal Stoker. However, during the course of the game, she discovers that she was actually fighting a real battle rather than performing in a simulation.

== Gameplay ==
The first level

The player assumes the role of a female pilot (presented only in several cut-scenes) controlling a prototype CS-05 tank. The tank can move and shoot in any direction, it is also possible to strafe as the tank's firing position can be locked at any time by pressing the second action button. The action is presented in a top-down perspective and takes place across 7 large fields full of enemies and obstacles, with each level being composed of several sub-stages. Most of the levels feature free-directional scrolling areas allowing the players to seek out items and enemies however they wish. Progressing through a stage requires the fulfillment of a necessary condition (usually the destruction of a group of enemies or a mini-boss), an arrow and a Go! sign appear when the conditions are met. Scattered across the stages the players can find extra lives, energy refills and power pods which expand the tank's arsenal. There are five types of weapons available: a rapid firing machine gun, a double barreled laser beam, mines, homing missiles and a force field that damages anything that runs into it. Each weapon can be powered-up by collecting the same power pod twice and can also unleash a special attack (activated by pressing Select).

== Development ==
Metal Stoker was created by Japanese video game developer Sankindo, who had previously worked on games like Cross Wiber and Time Cruise. Japanese film director Hiroyuki Nasu, famous for his award-winning film adaptation of the manga Bee Bop High School, was in charge of the game's direction and graphic design. The game's soundtrack was composed by Hiroto Saitou, who would later work on the PS3 adventure game Folklore (2007), and Nozomu Takahashi who, following the release of Metal Stoker, became a production manager for Studio Ghibli.

== Reception ==
Reception

Review scores
Publication	Score
Aktueller Software Markt	9/12
Consoles +	85%
Famitsu	25/40
Gekkan PC Engine	85/100, 90/100, 85/100, 80/100, 85/100
Joystick	69%
Marukatsu PC Engine	7/10, 7/10, 7/10, 7/10
Electric Brain	77%
Hippon Super!	6/10

Metal Stoker received a 19.47/30 score in a 1993 readers' poll conducted by PC Engine Fan, ranking among PC Engine titles at the number 366 spot. The game garnered generally favorable reviews from critics. Guido Alt of Aktueller Software Markt felt that the game was well-made from a technical standpoint, commending its graphics, music and smooth scrolling. Alt also praised its difficulty curve, arguing that its slowly increasing level of difficulty made it suitable for both beginners and experienced players.

In their retrospective review, Hardcore Gaming 101 argued that Metal Stoker features elements that "help it stand out among the PC Engine's other overhead shooters today". They praised the graphics and soundtrack and highlighted the variety in the game's level design and scenery, noticing that "this variety is where the game consistently shines. (...) There will be a number of specific powerful foes you will usually need to destroy to progress, and every one of these areas (...) has a different look and enemies unique to them to keep things interesting".

== See also ==
Ender's Game, a novel with an identical twist.
