= Jantei Story =

- PC Engine cover art
- Series: Jantei Monogatari
- Platforms: PC Engine, Sega Mega Drive
- Release: PC Engine: JP: October 9, 1990; Sega Mega Drive: JP: March 29, 1991
- Genres: Adventure, mahjong

Jantei Story (Note: Japanese: 雀偵物語, Hepburn: Jantei Monogatari; lit. The Sparrow Detective Story) is a 1990 video game. It combines both adventure game and mahjong gameplay into a story about a detective looking for a lost girl. The game progresses as the player does rounds of mahjong against various female opponents to progress the story.

The game was released in Japan for the PC Engine on October 9, 1990 and the Sega Mega Drive on March 29, 1991. It led to a series of Jantei Monogatari games that lasted until 1993.

Critics in the Japanese video game magazines Gekkan PC Engine, Marukatsu PC Engine and Famicom Tsūshin have complimented the games graphics and animation. Reviews in these magazines were split on the quality of the game as a mahjong title or how the table tops game meshed with an adventure game.

== Plot and gameplay ==
Jantei Story begins with the detective searching for a missing girl. As the adventure unfolds, game of mahjong are interspersed through the story.

== Development and release ==
Towards the late 1980s, mahjong-themed arcade games were popular in Japan game centers. Jantei Story was one of the many mahjong video games released for the PC Engine that featured eroticized content, such as opponents who wear swimsuits. The developers called it less of a mahjong game and more of a game to take advantage of the animation capabilities of CD-ROMs.

Jantei Story was released in Japan for the PC Engine on October 9, 1990. It was later released for the Sega Mega Drive in Japan on March 29, 1991. Jantei Story was the first in a series of Jantei Monogatari games that were released between 1990 and 1993. The next release in the series was released in 1992 in two parts as Jantei Monogatari 2: Uchū Tantei Divan - Shutsudō-hen (Note: 雀偵物語2 宇宙探偵ディバン 完結編; lit. The Sparrow Detective Story 2: Space Detective Divan: The Deployment) and Jantei Monogatari 2: Uchū Tantei Divan - Kanketsu-hen (Note: 雀偵物語2 宇宙探偵ディバン 出動編; lit. The Sparrow Detective Story 2: Space Detective Divan: The Final Chapter).

== Reception ==
Reception

Review scores
Publication	Score	
Publication	Sega Genesis	TurboGrafx-16
Famicom Tsūshin	7/10, 8/10, 7/10, 6/10	7/10, 8/10, 7/10, 5/10
Gekkan PC Engine		70/100, 85/100, 70/100, 75/100, 85/100
Hippon Super!	3/10	
Marukatsu PC Engine		5/10, 6/10, 8/10, 7/10

Reviewing the PC Engine version, reviewers in the Japanese magazines Gekkan PC Engine, Marukatsu PC Engine and Famicom Tsūshin complimented the graphics and animation with one reviewer in the first magazine specifically noting the character's expressions and movements. While one reviewer in Marukatsu PC Engine found the characters and their voice actors matched well, a reviewer in Famicom Tsūshin found the voice acting to be amateur.

One reviewer in Marukatsu PC Engine and Hippon Super! said that the game felt like an arcade mahjong game. While a reviewer in Gekkan PC Engine felt that challenge was balanced, a Marukatsu PC Engine reviewer said the quality of Jantei Story as mahjong game itself was just average. A second reviewer in Marukatsu PC Engine said the opponents' mahjong skills are okay in the first half, but become ridiculously difficult in the second half. Reviewing the Mega Drive version, the reviewer in Hippon Super! said that the ability to cheat and all the lack of skill in the opponents made the game end far too quickly.

Reviewers in Gekkan PC Engine and Markatsu PC Engine said the cute girl opponents in the game made it worth playing. One Famicom Tsūshin reviewer said that the sex appeal of the opponents enhanced the game as otherwise, there was no real excitement in just playing mahjong while another reviewer in the magazine lamented it lacked any "stripping" element to the gameplay.

Some reviewers in Marukatsu PC Engine and Famicom Tsūshin complimented the attempt to include adventure game mechanics, with a reviewer in the latter magazine saying that there were several attempts to combine mahjong with other genres, but that this game was particularly well done. Alternatively, two other reviewers in Marukatsu PC Engine and Famicom Tsūshin described the hybrid of mahjong and adventure game as feeling forced or haphazardly combine respectively. One reviewer in Gekkan PC Engine summarized that most players will follow the story just to see what the next mahjong opponent will be like.
