= Super Mahjong Taikai =

1992 video game

- Developer: Koei
- Publisher: Koei
- Platforms: PC Engine, Super Famicom
- Release: JP: 1992-09-12
- Genre: Strategy
- Mode: Single-player

Super Mahjong Taikai (スーパー麻雀大会 / Super Mahjong Tournament) is a Japanese mahjong video game that was released in Japan by Koei, now Koei Tecmo, in September 1992.

== Overview ==
The players in the game each start out with $100 and the goal of attaining $10,000. The game modes are Suzumesho mode and mahjong tournament mode. If a player becomes bankrupt or attains $10,000.00, the game starts over with each player having $100 each.

== Basic system ==
The game implements rules of Japanese mahjong, including Dan么nine (断么九) and Dora. The 21 available computer-controlled opponents have background music and character dialogue that can include puns.

== Mahjong tournament mode ==
In a tournament up to 22 players can participate. A computer-controlled character can participate even if the player is in debt.

Qualifying 3 Zhuo 12 people (6 people advance, ten seed), the quarter-finals involve 4 Zhuo 16 people (eight people advance), the semi-finals involve 2 Zhuo 8 people (4 people advance), and the finals are done in groups of 4 people.

The winning prize money goes up in accordance with free competition. Initially, the money is set to $120, which increases every time the number of competitions increase. The second place prize money is half that of first place, and the third place prize money is half that of second place.

A public competition has each player assigned from 1 frame to 8 frames (1–6 frames involves 3 people, frames 7 and 8 involve 2 people); players can be expected to see who will win. At that time, a trifecta can be placed for $20 each, and a player who wins can receive an amount of money that is multiplied by 20.

== Characters ==
The characters in the game include the following individuals listed in order.

- Oda Nobunaga – A 16th century warlord from the Warring States period.
- Toyotomi Hideyoshi – A general from the Sengoku period.
- Tokugawa Ieyasu – First shōgun of the Tokugawa shogunate. Often does Tenpai (聴牌).
- Cleopatra – Last pharaoh of Ancient Egypt.
- Yang Guifei
- Ono no Komachi – A Waka poet from the early Heian period. Does fun and bright mahjong.
- Sakamoto Ryōma – Samurai and politician from the Bakumatsu period.
- Minamoto no Yoshitsune – A general from the late Heian period.
- Miyamoto Musashi – Expert swordsman and rōnin. Always fails when trying a one-shot reversal.
- Zhuge Liang – The most accomplished strategist of the Shu Han Chinese state during the Three Kingdoms period.
- Nostradamus – Famously published collections of prophecies.
- Kou Shibusawa
- Genghis Khan – Founder and emperor of the Mongol Empire. Plays mahjong in a secure and dignified manner.
- Napoleon – A French emperor.
- Julius Caesar – A Roman general and statesman. Has a brutish attack but also exhibits human weakness.
