= Kunihiro Abe =

Japanese animator

- 阿部 邦博
- Born: 1968
- Died: August 15, 2018 (aged 49–50)
- Known for: Animator

Kunihiro Abe (阿部 邦博, Abe Kunihiro; 1968 – 15 August 2018) was a Japanese animator.

Abe was known for his mechanical animation, in particular his animation for various projects in Sunrise's Gundam franchise.

Kunihiro Abe was also a notable animator in various AIC projects, such as Bubblegum Crisis, Dangaioh, Vampire Princess Miyu, Dragon Century, Megazone 23 Part III, Sol Bianca, Record of Lodoss War: Chronicles of the Heroic Knight, Armitage III, El Hazard - The Magnificent World, and Blue Genders.

Abe worked also with animator Masami Obari on Fight! Iczer-One, Dangaioh, and Daimaju Gekito Hagane no Oni and with animator Kou Matsuo.

Abe died on 15 August 2018 at the age of 50 of undisclosed cause. Abe's daughter shared one of his illustrations, and noted that "she knew her father loved to draw and could not live as anything other than an animator".

== Works ==
- Mobile Suit Gundam 0083: Stardust Memory
- Mobile Suit Gundam 0083: The Afterglow of Zeon
- Mobile Suit Gundam Wing
- Mobile Suit Gundam Wing: Operation Meteor
- Mobile Suit Gundam Seed
- Mobile Suit Zeta Gundam: A New Translation
- Mobile Suit Gundam Seed C.E.73: Stargazer
- Mobile Suit Gundam 00
- Mobile Suit Gundam UC
- Gundam Build Fighters
- Gundam: Reconguista in G
- Mobile Suit Gundam: Iron-Blooded Orphans
- Mobile Suit Gundam Thunderbolt
