= Psycho Chaser =

1990 video game

- Developer: Sting Entertainment
- Publisher: Naxat Soft
- Director: Tomoyuki Yamagishi
- Programmer: Toyofumi Kunihiro
- Artists: Shinichi Abe; Tsutomu Takase
- Composer: Yasue Santō
- Platform: PC Engine
- Release: JP: April 6, 1990
- Genre: Vertically scrolling shooter
- Mode: Single-player

Psycho Chaser (Note: Japanese: サイコチェイサー, Hepburn: Saiko Cheisā) is a 1990 vertically scrolling shooter video game released by Naxat for the NEC PC Engine.

== Gameplay ==
Gameplay screenshot

Psycho Chaser is a vertical-scrolling shoot 'em up game.

== Development and release ==
Psycho Chaser was released by Naxat Soft for the PC Engine.

== Reception ==
Reception

Review scores
Publication	Score
AllGame	3.5/5
Aktueller Software Markt	7/12
Famitsu	6/10, 7/10, 7/10, 6/10
Gekkan PC Engine	70/100, 70/100, 70/100, 75/100, 80/100
Génération 4	60%
Joystick	65%
The Games Machine (UK)	53%
Tilt	13/20
Famicom Hisshoubon	2.5/5
Power Play	75%

Psycho Chaser received average reviews.
