= Syd Mead's Terraforming =

1992 video game

- Developer: Right Stuff
- Publishers: JP: Right Stuff; NA: Turbo Technologies
- Producer: Jun Satō
- Designer: Jun Satō
- Programmer: Tadakatsu Ogura
- Artist: Syd Mead
- Composer: Katsuhiro Hayashi
- Platform: TurboDuo
- Release: JP: May 1, 1992; NA: May 1993
- Genre: Horizontal-scrolling shooter
- Mode: Single-player

Syd Mead's Terraforming (Note: Japanese: テラフォーミング, Hepburn: Terafōmingu) is a 1992 side-scrolling shoot 'em up video game released by Right Stuff for the TurboGrafx-CD.

== Gameplay ==
Syd Mead's Terraforming is a side-scrolling shoot 'em up game.

== Development and release ==
It is notable for its unique graphics designed by Syd Mead, who also worked on popular American films such as Blade Runner, Aliens, and Tron.

== Reception ==
Reception

Review scores
Publication	Score
Consoles +	80%
Famitsu	5/10, 5/10, 6/10, 4/10
Gekkan PC Engine	75/100, 80/100, 80/100, 75/100, 75/100
Génération 4	92%
Joypad	79%
Joystick	85%
Marukatsu PC Engine	5/10, 7/10, 8/10, 6/10
Player One	79%
VideoGames & Computer Entertainment	5/10
DuoWorld	10/10
VideoGames	5/10

Syd Mead's Terraforming received average reviews. Famitsu's four reviewers noted the game's design but found its gameplay subpar. TurboPlay's Victor Ireland considered it an impressive title, highlighting its graphics and solid gameplay, but lamented the uninspired bosses. GamePro's Otter Matic singled out the game's visuals as its high point, but felt that the soundscapes were inconsistent and found the gameplay to be far from original. Electronic Gaming Monthly's four editors criticized the game's audiovisual department, simple enemy patterns, and average gameplay.
