= Mystic Formula =

1993 video game

- Developer: Microcabin
- Publisher: Microcabin
- Artist: Kunihiro Abe
- Platform: PC Engine Super CD-ROM²
- Release: JP: July 23, 1993
- Genre: Run and gun
- Mode: Single-player

Mystic Formula (Note: Japanese: ミスティックフォーミュラ, Hepburn: Misutikku Fōmyura) is a 1993 run and gun video game released by Microcabin for the PC Engine Super CD-ROM².

== Gameplay ==
Gameplay screenshot

Mystic Formula is a multidirectional shoot 'em up game. It's a "run-and-gun" game that takes place in an anime version of the Wild West. The artwork was done by Kunihiro Abe. It's bright and attractive, giving the game a 90's vibe to this day.

== Development and Release ==
Mystic Formula was released by the Microcabin Game Studio on July 23rd,1993.

== Reception ==
Reception

Review scores
Publication	Score
Famitsu	6/10, 4/10, 4/10, 4/10
Gekkan PC Engine	60/100, 70/100, 60/100, 65/100, 70/100
Mega Fun	69%
Hippon Super!	4/10

Mystic Formula received mixed reviews. Famitsu's four reviewers considered the game too difficult. Hardcore Gaming 101's Kurt Kalata praised the game's artwork and cutscenes, but harshly criticized its graphics and level design.
