= Override (video game) =

1991 video game

- Developer: Sting Entertainment
- Publishers: Data East (PCE); Sting Entertainment (X68000)
- Platforms: PC Engine, X68000
- Release: PC Engine: JP: January 8, 1991; X68000: JP: November 15, 1991
- Genre: Scrolling shooter
- Mode: Single-player

Override (Note: Japanese: オーバーライド, Hepburn: Ōbāraido) is a vertically scrolling shooter developed by Sting Entertainment and published by Data East in 1991 for the PC Engine. A port to the X68000 was self-published by Sting as Last Battalion (Note: Japanese: ラストバタリオン, Hepburn: Rasuto Batarion).

== Gameplay ==
The player can increase the power of their primary weapon by collecting “P” items. The player's ship also has a charge feature, where if the fire button is not touched for a few seconds, the ship will charge up a powerful shot that can destroy many of the enemies on-screen. The player can also acquire secondary weapons by collecting a gem. The gem changes colors, and depending on which color it is when collected, the player will get a different weapon. Players can power up their secondary weapon by collecting another gem of the same color.

== Development and release ==
The X68000 version is available as a free "one stage only" demo download on Sting's website.

On September 4, 2007, G-Mode published the PC Engine version on the Japanese Virtual Console for the Wii.

== Reception ==
Reception

Review scores
Publication	Score
Computer and Video Games	80%
Famitsu	30/40
Génération 4	54%
Joystick	82%
Marukatsu PC Engine	9/10, 8/10, 7/10, 8/10
Player One	84%
Tilt	13/20
Hippon Super!	5/10
Micro News	3/5
PC Engine Gamer	785/1000

Override received an average reception from critics. Japanese publication Micom BASIC Magazine ranked the game twelfth in popularity in its March 1991 issue, and it received a score of 19.67 out of 30 in a 1993 readers' poll conducted by PC Engine Fan, ranking among PC Engine titles at the number 354 spot. Its conversion for the X68000, Last Battalion, also received a middling reception from reviewers.
