= Burning Angels =

1990 Japanese video game

- Developer: Naxat Soft
- Publisher: Naxat Soft
- Artist: Kenji Mori
- Composers: Hiroshi Nishikawa; Makiko Ito
- Platform: PC Engine
- Release: JP: December 7, 1990
- Genre: Scrolling shooter
- Modes: Single-player, multiplayer

Burning Angels (Note: Japanese: バーニングエンジェル, Hepburn: Bāningu Enjerusu) is a 1990 shoot 'em up video game developed and published by Naxat Soft for the PC Engine only in Japan.

== Gameplay ==
Gameplay screenshot

Gameplay consists of 7 stages, and the game allows for simultaneous co-op play. The game also allows for horizontal or vertical screen view.

== Development and release ==
Burning Angels was developed and published by Naxat Soft.

== Reception ==
Reception

Review scores
Publication	Score
Famitsu	7/10, 5/10, 6/10, 5/10
Génération 4	82%
Joystick	79%
Marukatsu PC Engine	6/10, 7/10, 7/10, 6/10
Player One	89%
Raze	69%
Tilt	13/20
Hippon Super!	6/10
Micro News	5/5
Power Play	58%

Burning Angels received generally favorable reviews. Japanese publication Micom BASIC Magazine ranked the game fourteen in popularity in its March 1991 issue.
