= Psychosis (video game) =

1990 video game

- North American cover art
- Developer: Naxat Soft
- Publisher: NEC
- Composer: Atsuhiro Motoyama
- Platform: PC Engine/TurboGrafx-16
- Release: 1990
- Genre: Horizontally scrolling shooter
- Mode: Single-player

Psychosis (Paranoia in Japan) is a side-scrolling shooter video game developed by Naxat Soft and published by NEC for the PC Engine/TurboGrafx-16. It was released in 1990 by Naxat Soft, which also released the games Alien Crush and Devil's Crush (two pinball type games). When released it was praised for its colorful graphics and original backstory. It was released on the Wii's Virtual Console in 2008.

== Story ==
The player's mind has been taken over by an evil power, or at least that is what they are led to think. This force, "The Devil Ugar", plans to make their mind his own, but the player's character will not give up without a fight. The player used their mind to create the vehicle that will travel through their conscious and subconscious to win back their sanity.

== Gameplay ==
Psychosis is a side scrolling shooter. When the ship obtains a power up two indestructible satellites that can be positioned above, behind, below, or in front of the ship using the I button appear. Different powerups (in the form of colored orbs with letters in them) change the satellites in different ways. Some allow the satellites to shoot, others endow them with an electric shield. The II button fires the main weapons. The game consists of 5 stages (causes) with a boss at the end of each. The game is started with 3 ships with an extra ship available at every 50,000 points. Psychosis is a one-player game.

There are minor region differences between the Japanese and US versions. The first is the intermissions and game over screens where an imp will curse at and flip off the player in the Japanese but waves a finger in the US. The other is the swapping between stages 2 and 3 in the US version.

== Reception ==
Reception

Review scores
Publication	Score
Electronic Gaming Monthly	8/10, 8/10, 8/10, 8/10
GamePro	23/25
