= Sinistron (video game) =

1990 video game

- Developer: Alfa System
- Publisher: IGS
- Programmer: Kenichi Sakai
- Artists: Jun Mikawa; Taku Shimizu
- Platform: TurboGrafx-16
- Release: JP: December 14, 1990; NA: January 1991
- Genre: Scrolling shooter
- Mode: Single-player

Sinistron (Note: Known in Japan as Violent Soldier (Japanese: バイオレントソルジャー, Hepburn: Baiorento Sorujā).) is a horizontally scrolling shooter released for the TurboGrafx-16 in 1990.

== Gameplay ==
Gameplay screenshot

The jaws of the player's spacecraft are adjustable. Opening the invincible jaws of the ship increases the spread of the player's shots but exposes the vulnerable cockpit. Obtaining one weapon upgrade allows the ship's jaws to be set half-way open (a 3-shot spread) or closed (with increased damage), and a second upgrade allows them to be closed, half open, or fully open (a 5-shot spread).

Five power-ups exist in the game. The Vulcan flame cannon, crystal-pulse laser, and CHAOS (homing) missiles are weapon upgrades. There are also speed upgrades and plasma droids, invincible pods which will flank the ship. The plasma droids can absorb enemy pellets and will even damage enemies they come into contact with.

The ship's charge-up attack releases a circular wave of force that will damage all enemies in a radius around the ship.

The game has six stages of quickly increasing difficulty. The last two stages take place inside the Sinistron creature itself.

== Plot ==
The story differs partly depending on the PC Engine and TurboGrafix-16 version.

PC Engine: Earth astronomers observe a supernova many astronomical units away; some time after the supernova, several iron cells and alien debris fly directly from the destroyed sun and into the Solar System towards the Earth. After much chaos and the continual shower of iron cells, it was ruled out that the disaster was invasion related, resulting in the construction of a fleet of space fighter class called the Violent Soldier. The Violent Soldiers are sent to the source of the supernova whereupon they find the automated ruins of an advanced civilization led by an enormous, cybernetic iron-spewing alien monster.

TurboGrafix-16: A massive, planet-devouring, cybernetic entity named Sinistron approaches the Solar System. After devouring Pluto, a fleet of space fighters is sent to destroy it, but only one (the player's) survives.

== Reception ==
Reception

Review scores
Publication	Score
AllGame	4.5/5
Famitsu	6/10, 6/10, 6/10, 4/10
Génération 4	71%
Joystick	85%
Marukatsu PC Engine	7/10, 7/10, 7/10, 8/10
Player One	75%
Tilt	13/20
Video Games (DE)	80%
VideoGames & Computer Entertainment	6/10
Zero	78/100
Game Zone	3/5
Micro News	4/5
Power Play	80%
TurboPlay	4/5

Sinistron received generally favorable reviews. Japanese publication Micom BASIC Magazine ranked the game thirteen in popularity in its March 1991 issue.
