= Toy Shop Boys =

1990 video game

- Developer: Mutech
- Publisher: Victor Musical Industries
- Director: Yoshinao Shimada
- Producer: Harunobu Komori
- Designer: Yoshinao Shimada
- Programmers: Ken Hasegawa; Takashi Oka
- Artists: Kazuya Matsuzawa; Kumiko Watanabe; Yasuhiro Kanō; Yojiro Hirashita
- Writer: Hiroyuki Sakai
- Platform: PC Engine
- Release: JP: December 14, 1990
- Genre: Vertically scrolling shooter
- Mode: Single-player

Toy Shop Boys (Note: Japanese: トイショップ ボーイズ, Hepburn: Toi Shoppu Bōizu) is a vertically scrolling shoot 'em up video game released in 1990 for the NEC PC Engine by Victor.

== Gameplay ==
Gameplay screenshot

Toy Shop Boys is a vertical-scrolling shooter game.

== Development and release ==
Toy Shop Boys was published by Victor Musical Industries.

== Reception ==
Reception

Review scores
Publication	Score
Computer and Video Games	70%
Famitsu	7/10, 6/10, 6/10, 5/10
Génération 4	73%
Joystick	80%
Marukatsu PC Engine	5/10, 6/10, 5/10, 7/10
Player One	76%
Tilt	10/20
Hippon Super!	5/10
Micro News	3/5
Play Time	91%

Toy Shop Boys received average reviews. The Japanese publication Micom BASIC Magazine ranked the game fifteenth in popularity in its April 1991 issue.
