= Nexzr =

1992 video game

- Cover art by Yuji Kaida
- Developer: Inter State
- Publisher: Naxat Soft
- Producer: Akihiko Utō
- Designer: Hiroshi Yokoyama
- Programmers: Takaaki Sōno; Takashi Yamashita
- Artists: Hiroshi Yokoyama; Jun Mashino; Kenji Yamamoto
- Composers: Katsuya Yoneda; Tatsuya Watanabe; Yasushi Wada
- Platform: PC Engine Super CD-ROM²
- Release: JP: December 11, 1992
- Genre: Vertically scrolling shooter
- Mode: Single-player

Nexzr (Note: Japanese: ネクスザール, Hepburn: Nekusuzāru) is a 1992 vertically scrolling shoot 'em up video game released by Naxat for the NEC PC Engine Super CD-ROM².

== Gameplay ==
Gameplay screenshot

Nexzr is a vertical-scrolling shoot 'em up game, with gameplay focused on defeating enemies and bosses while navigating through different scrolling 2D environments. The player assumes the role of a spaceship with a rotating selection of projectile weapons.

== Development and release ==
A special "time-attack" edition was released for Naxat's Summer Carnival contest.

== Reception ==
Reception

Review scores
Publication	Score
Consoles +	85%
Famitsu	7/10, 5/10, 5/10, 5/10
Gekkan PC Engine	90/100, 85/100, 75/100, 85/100, 85/100
Joypad	82%
Marukatsu PC Engine	6/10, 9/10, 8/10, 7/10
Player One	70%
Dengeki PC Engine	60/100, 85/100, 65/100, 90/100
Hippon Super!	9/10

Nexzr was met with generally favorable reviews.
