= Barunba =

1990 video game

- Developer: ZAP Corporation
- Publisher: Namco
- Platforms: PC Engine, MSX2
- Release: 1989 (Japan), 1990 (Europe)
- Genre: Shoot 'em up
- Mode: Single player

Barunba (Note: Japanese: バルンバ) is a shoot 'em up video game released in 1990 by Namco for the NEC PC Engine console and the MSX2 computer line.

It received positive reviews from European gaming magazines at the time, with Aktueller Software Markt and Joystick noting its similarity to Mr. Heli and praising its gameplay and graphics.
