= Bōken Danshaku Don: The Lost Sunheart =

1992 video game

- Developer: Manjyudo
- Publisher: I'MAX
- Producer: Kazuya Tobita
- Programmer: Teruaki Kawaguchi
- Artist: Takao Yoshiba
- Composer: Takane Ōkubo
- Platform: PC Engine
- Release: JP: January 4, 1992
- Genre: Horizontal-scrolling shooter
- Mode: Single-player

Bōken Danshaku Don: The Lost Sunheart (Note: Japanese: 冒険男爵★ドンサン・ハート編, Hepburn: Bōken Danshaku Don: San Hāto-hen) is a 1992 side-scrolling shoot 'em up video game published by I'MAX for the NEC PC Engine.

== Gameplay ==
Gameplay screenshot

The game features dark and surreal themes and has been compared to the Cho Aniki series.

== Development and release ==
It was designed by Takane Ōkubo, who also worked on Zombie Nation, a similar game.

== Reception ==
Reception

Review scores
Publication	Score
Consoles +	68%
Famitsu	6/10, 6/10, 7/10, 5/10
Gekkan PC Engine	75/100, 70/100, 75/100, 75/100, 65/100
Joypad	67%
Joystick	67%
Marukatsu PC Engine	5/10, 7/10, 8/10, 7/10
Excalibur	45%

Bōken Danshaku Don: The Lost Sunheart received average reviews.
