= Alzadick =

1992 video game

- Developer: Naxat Soft
- Publisher: Naxat Soft
- Director: Kazuhiko Inoue
- Producer: Kazuhiko Inoue
- Designer: Kazuhiko Inoue
- Programmer: Yoshinori Hironaka
- Artists: Manabu Sakai; Toshiharu Tagami
- Composer: Daisuke Morishima
- Platform: PC Engine CD-ROM²
- Release: JP: July 17, 1992
- Genre: Vertically scrolling shooter
- Mode: Single-player

Alzadick (Note: Also known as Summer Carnival '92: Alzadick (Japanese: アルザディック サマーカーニバル'92, Hepburn: Aruzadikku Samā Kānibaru '92).) is a 1992 "time attack"-style vertically scrolling shoot 'em up video game released for the NEC PC Engine CD-ROM² by Naxat.

== Gameplay ==
Gameplay screenshot

Alzadick is a vertical-scrolling shoot 'em up game.

== Development and release ==
Alzadick was originally made for its Summer Carnival '92 competition, which also included Recca.

== Reception ==
Reception

Review scores
Publication	Score
Famitsu	7/10, 6/10, 7/10, 6/10
Gekkan PC Engine	75/100, 75/100, 80/100, 85/100, 75/100
Joypad	51%
Joystick	50%
Marukatsu PC Engine	8/10, 8/10, 6/10, 7/10

Alzadick received average reviews.
