= Right Stuff (company) =

Japanese video game production company

Right Stuff Co. Ltd 株式会社ライトスタッフ
- Industry: Video games
- Founded: February 27, 1990; 36 years ago
- Defunct: 1999
- Fate: Bankruptcy and liquidation
- Headquarters: No. 10 No. 10 6-chome, Nishi-Ōi, Shinagawa, Tokyo, Japan
- Key people: Shima Tetsuro (CEO); Kimura Akihiro; Atsushi Ii
- Website: web.archive.org/web/*sa_/www.right-stuff.co.jp

Right Stuff Co. Ltd. (株式会社ライトスタッフ), abbreviated as RS, was a video game production company that was founded on February 27, 1990, in Nishi-Ōi, Shinagawa, Tokyo, Japan.

== Games ==
=== Developed ===
Year	Title	Original platform(s)	Publisher	Co-developer
1991	Alshark	PC-98, X68000, FM Towns, Sega CD, PC Engine CD	Right Stuff, Polydor K.K., Victor Entertainment	CRC Research Institute (Sega CD), Ocarina System (PC Engine CD)
1992	Syd Mead's Terraforming	PC Engine CD	Right Stuff, Turbo Technologies	
1992	Libros de Chilam Balam	PC-98	Right Stuff	
1993	Fiend Hunter	PC Engine CD	Right Stuff	
1993	Sword Master	PC Engine CD	Right Stuff	
1993	Flash Hiders	PC Engine CD	Right Stuff	
1994	Revery: Izanai no Masuishō	PC-98	Right Stuff	
1994	Foresight Dolly	PC-98, MS-DOS	Right Stuff	
1994	Alnam no Kiba: Shouzoku Juunishinto Densetsu	PC Engine CD	Right Stuff	
1994	Emerald Dragon	PC Engine CD	NEC Home Electronics	Alfa System
1995	THE TV SHOW	PC Engine CD	Right Stuff	
1995	Battle Tycoon: Flash Hiders SFX	Super Famicom	Right Stuff	
1996	Blue Forest Story: Kaze no Fuuin	3DO, PlayStation	Panasonic, Right Stuff	MBA International (PlayStation)
1996	Alnam no Kiba: Shouzoku Juunishinto Densetsu	PlayStation	Right Stuff	
1996	Jockey Zero	PlayStation	Right Stuff	Zerosystem
1997	Alnam no Tsubasa: Shōjin no Sora no Kanata e	PlayStation	Right Stuff	
1998	Himitsu Kessha Q	PlayStation	Right Stuff	

=== Published ===
Year	Title	Platform	Developer
1995	Dungeon Hack	PC-98	Cybelle

=== Cancelled ===
Title	Platform	Publisher(s)	Planned release date/Last year developed or mentioned	Notes
Blue Forest Story	PC Engine CD	Right Stuff	1994	Reworked for 3DO and PlayStation.
Virtual Jockey	Virtual Boy	Right Stuff	1995	Reworked for PlayStation and released as Jockey Zero.
Alnam no Kiba: Shouzoku Juunishinto Densetsu	Super Famicom	Right Stuff	1995	

== Other ==
A newsletter titled "RSのどいつもこいつも!!" was issued.
