= God Panic: Shijō Saikyō Gundan =

1992 video game

- Developer: Teichiku
- Publisher: Teichiku
- Platform: PC Engine Super CD-ROM²
- Release: JP: November 27, 1992
- Genre: Vertically scrolling shooter
- Mode: Single-player

God Panic: Shijō Saikyō no Gundan (Note: Japanese: ゴッドパニック 至上最強軍団, Hepburn: Goddopanikku Shijō Saikyō Gundan) is a 1992 vertically scrolling shooter video game released by Teichiku for the NEC PC Engine Super CD-ROM².

== Gameplay ==
Gameplay screenshot

God Panic: Shijō Saikyō Gundan is a vertical-scrolling shoot 'em up game.

== Development and release ==
God Panic: Shijō Saikyō no Gundan was published by Teichiku.

== Reception ==
Reception

Review scores
Publication	Score
Famitsu	7/10, 5/10, 6/10, 3/10
Gekkan PC Engine	65/100, 70/100, 80/100, 70/100, 75/,100
Joypad	56%
Joystick	55%
Marukatsu PC Engine	4/10, 5/10, 8/10, 4/10
Player One	55%

God Panic: Shijō Saikyō Gundan received mixed reviews.
