= Image Fight II: Operation Deepstriker =

1992 video game

- Developer: Irem
- Publisher: Irem
- Platform: PC Engine Super CD-ROM²
- Release: December 18, 1992
- Genre: Vertically scrolling shooter
- Mode: Single-player

Image Fight II: Operation Deepstriker (Note: Japanese: イメージファイトII, Hepburn: Imēji Faito Tsu) is a 1992 vertically scrolling shooter video game released by Irem for the NEC PC Engine Super CD-ROM². It is the sequel to the 1988 title Image Fight.

The game was available on the Wii Virtual Console only in Japan on December 11, 2007. It is also included in Irem Collection Volume 1 for the Nintendo Switch, PlayStation 4, PlayStation 5, Xbox One, Xbox Series X/S in 2023.

== Reception ==
Markt+Technik's Video Games gave the title a 72% rating, stating that the title is not innovative and is more difficult than its predecessor.

Player One gave it a 58% rating, calling it bland and derivative in a playful review written as a radio transmission.

The coverage by Joypad was very positive, praising the game's soundtrack, gameplay, and difficulty.

Hardcore Gaming 101 criticized the title's cutscenes and music, rating it as a middle-tier game for its year.
