= Kaga Create =

Video game developing and publishing division of Kaga Electronics

- Native name: 加賀クリエイト株式会社
- Industry: Video games, graphic design, web page production, new source production, merchandise development, event promotion
- Predecessor: Digital Gain
- Founded: June 22, 1988 (as Naxat); October 18, 1999 (as Digital Gain)
- Defunct: December 31, 2015
- Headquarters: Century Tower, Bunkyo, Tokyo, Japan
- Key people: Tomoyasu Kato (President of directors)
- Products: Alien Crush; Devil's Crush; Psychosis
- Number of employees: 13 (as of 2008-03-31)
- Parent: Kaga Electronics (100% stake)
- Website: http://www.kaga-create.co.jp/

Kaga Create Co., Ltd., formerly Naxat Soft, was a Japan-based video game developing and publishing division of Kaga Electronics.

The company initially released games for the PC Engine (known as the TurboGrafx-16 in North America). It later released titles for a wide array of gaming systems, including the Nintendo Entertainment System, Game Boy, Super NES, Dreamcast, 3DO, PlayStation, Sega Saturn, and PC-FX. The company's releases mostly stopped around 2005, with their final games primarily being re-releases of PC Engine titles on the Wii Virtual Console.

== History ==
Kaga's video game division was founded on June 22, 1988 under the name 'Naxat'. The company is named from the backwards spelling of Taxan, which is a brand owned by its parent company.

To compete with Hudson's own Caravan video game marathon competitions in the late 80s, NAXAT held a similar competition dubbed Summer Carnival. The game for which the company is best known, Summer Carnival '92: Recca, commonly abbreviated to simply Recca, was created for this competition and named after it. The Summer Carnival was held for only three years and was not as successful as Hudson's.

In 1998, the company was renamed to Kaga Tech Co., Ltd, but the video games were still sold under the Naxat Soft brand.

In October 1999, Digital Gain Co., Ltd. was established, which was responsible for developing Naxat Soft titles.

Kaga Electronics merged KAGA TECH CO., LTD. and KANTO AUTOMATION Co., Ltd., on April 1, 2005. Under the terms of merger, the Amusement Machines Development Business of KAGA TECH CO., LTD. was transferred to the Specific Industry Sales Headquarters of KAGA ELECTRONICS, the Entrust Business for Game Software Development to the Digital Media Lab., Inc. (100% subsidiary of Kaga Electronics), and the Game Software Development Business to the subsidiary DIGITAL GAIN CO., LTD.

Digital Gain Co., Ltd. was renamed to Kaga Create Co., Ltd., on May 1, 2007. At the time of renaming, the company's business was expanded to graphic design, web page production, new source production, merchandise development, event promotion. It developed software for Pionesoft, Alchemist, and Milestone Inc.

== Summer Carnival ==
In 1991, Spriggan for the PC Engine CD system became the first competition game for Naxat.

In 1992, Recca for the Famicom and Alzadick for the PC Engine CD were the competition games.

In 1993, Nexzr Special for the PC Engine CD system was the game featured the last time Naxat held its Summer Carnival.

== Subsidiaries ==
In April 2010, Kaga Electronics Co., Ltd. acquired 51% of CyberFront Corporation, and became a subsidiary of Kaga Electronics. The remaining shares of CyberFront Corporation were acquired three years later in March. By December, Kaga Electronics Co., Ltd. began to shut down CyberFront Corporation following the discovery of inadequacies of CyberFront's intellectual property contracts and claims by business partners denying existence of such rights, and CyberFront Corporation founder Shinji Fujiwara's lack of cooperation in the investigation. As a result of dissolution, sales of Saints Row IV, Europa Universalis IV, and WRC 4: FIA World Rally Championship were cancelled, and the sales of Operation Abyss: New Tokyo Legacy were indefinitely delayed. Sales of titles at PlayStation Store were terminated from January 21–31, 2014, followed by sales termination at Xbox 360 Marketplace from January 25.

== See also ==
- KID, whose assets CyberFront purchased in February 2007.
- Mages (formerly 5pb.), who acquired CyberFront.
