= PC Engine Fan =

Japanese video game magazine

- Categories: Video game magazine
- Publisher: Tokuma Shoten
- Founded: 1988
- Final issue: 1996
- Country: Japan
- Based in: Shinagawa, Tokyo
- Language: Japanese

PC Engine Fan was a Japanese magazine dedicated to the PC Engine, published by Tokuma Shoten. It ran from 1988 to 1996.

== History ==
The first issue of PC Engine Fan was published in late 1988. The magazine originated as a section in Family Computer Magazine, but was eventually spun out into its own publication. The magazine had two sister titles – MSX Fan and Mega Drive Fan.

Artwork and covers for the magazine were often drawn by artist Akemi Takada. From 1993 onwards, the covers usually featured the magazine's mascot, Mana.

PC Engine Fan was the last magazine to focus exclusively on NEC consoles. It shut down in 1996, but two specials named Super PC Engine Fan Deluxe were published in 1997.

== CD-ROMs ==
Throughout its history, PC Engine Fan produced a number of discs, which could be played on a PC Engine with the CD-ROM² addon. The first disc is notable for including two homebrew games, which were not sold at retail. These games, developed with the Develo kit, are Frisbee Ken John – a one-button game about a dog catching a Frisbee, and Maru-Maru which was a simple Breakout clone.

- PC Engine Fan: Special CD-ROM Vol. 1 contained a simplified version of the game Virgin Dream as well as two homebrew games; Frisbee Ken John and Maru-Maru.
- PC Engine Fan: Special CD-ROM Vol. 2 contained demos of Kokuu Hyouryuu Nirgends and Blue Breaker, as well as a Game Database.
- PC Engine Fan: Special CD-ROM Vol. 3 contained a demo of Super God Trooper Zeroigar.
- Super PC Engine Fan Deluxe Special CD-ROM Vol.1 contains demos for Angelique Special 2, Yuna FX, Nirgends and Fire Woman.
- Super PC Engine Fan Deluxe Special CD-ROM Vol.2 contains demos for Comic Road, Tonari no Princess Rolfee!, Zoku Hatsukoi Monogatari and Last Imperial Prince.

== See also ==
- Video game journalism
