= List of Hudson Soft games =

This is a list of video games developed or published by Hudson Soft. The following dates are based on the earliest release, typically in Japan. While Hudson Soft started releasing video games in 1978, it was not until 1983 that the company began to gain serious notability among the video gaming community.

== Early computer titles (1983-1984) ==
Early on, Hudson Soft's strategy was to port games to as many (japanese) platforms as possible, many of which were short-lived. The table below includes known, preserved ports, including original version of games later remade for Famicom/NES.

Note: Unattested versions listed with ? are listed as existing on MobyGames.

Title	MSX	PC 6001 mkII	PC 8001 mkII	PC 8801	FM 7	MZ 2200	X1	Pa so pia 7	other	Description
3D Bomberman	Yes	Yes	?		?		Yes	?		Adaptation of the original Bomberman in a grid-based faux 3D perspective.
Akarui Nouen	Yes				?		Yes	Yes	Basic Master	Simple rice cultivation arcade game.
Anata wa Meikameraman			Yes				?			"Shooting" game involving photography.
Bean's Jack		?	?		?		Yes		SMC-777	Adaptation of the Jack and the Beanstalk fairy tale.
Binary Land	Yes	Yes		?	?	Yes	Yes			Game about controlling two player characters on the same time through different mazes filled with enemies. Later remade for Famicom/NES.
Biotech/Biotek	Yes	?			Yes					Simple single-screen title about cathing circular-shaped enemies.
Bomberman	Yes	Yes	?	Yes	Yes	Yes	Yes	Yes	MZ-700; SMC-777; Basic Master; ZX Spectrum	Original installment of the series, renamed for ZX Spectrum release as Eric and the Floaters. Gameplay is simpler than the NES remake, lacking many elements.
Boomerang Hunting							Yes			Hunting-themed shmup game involving namesake boomerang.
Bousou Tokkyuu SOS	Yes						?		SMC-777; ZX Spectrum	Released as Stop the Express in UK
Bubble Kund 1999	?	?	?		?		Yes	Yes	Basic Master	Type of shoot-'em-up. Player has to use number keys to launch missiles at right time to prevent circular-shaped "enemies" from blowing up japanese cities.
Cannon Ball	Yes	Yes	Yes	Yes	Yes	Yes	Yes	Yes	MZ-700; SMC-777; Multi8; RX-78; FP-1000; ZX Spectrum	Early version of Buster Bros. Released as Bubble Buster in UK.
Dish Carrier			Yes		?		?			About catching plates, utensils and other things falling from windows.
Field Wars		?	Yes	?	Yes		?	Yes	Basic Master	A Heiankyo Alien clone.
Fire Ball	Yes	?	Yes		?		?		SMC-777	About astronaut trying to catch titular enemies.
Fire Rescue	Yes	?	?		Yes		?		SMC-777	Firefighting-themed single-screen platformer.
Gang Man	Yes	Yes			?	Yes	Yes	Yes		Car chase/shooting title.
Gunman	Yes		Yes		Yes		Yes		MZ-700	Western-themed single-screen shmup where you shoot stereotypical indians.
Guru Guru							Yes			Single-screen attacking game.
Gusha					?		?		MZ-700	Alien-cathing title.
Gyoza Panic			Yes							About cathing gyozas falling from the top of the screen.
Help!	Yes	?	Yes		?	Yes	?		Basic Master	Climbing game about keeping snakes off the ropes to prevent apple from failing on girl's head.
Hitsuji Yaai	Yes	Yes	?	Yes	Yes	Yes	Yes	Yes		A simple children game about herding sheep.
Hiyoko Fighter	?	Yes	?	?	Yes	Yes	?	Yes	Basic Master	Maze game. You play as a chicken and collect eggs while avoiding snakes.
Inidan no Bouken	Yes						Yes			Maze game.
Itasundorious	Yes	Yes	Yes	?	?	Yes	Yes		ZX Spectrum	A Dig-Dug-like game. Released as Driller Tanks in UK.
Justice Knight		?	?	?	Yes	Yes	?	Yes		Maze game about rescuing the princess.
Kaeru Shooter	Yes	?	Yes		?		?	Yes	SMC-777; Basic Master; ZX Spectrum	Third-view pseudo-3d shooting game. Released as Frog Shooter in UK.
Kareina Kaito			Yes		Yes		?		Basic Master	Maze game about stealing money from banks and avoiding policemen.
Killer Station	Yes	?	Yes	?	Yes	?	?			A Space Invaders-like game.
Kinasai!	Yes	Yes	?	Yes	Yes	Yes			Basic Master	A Space Panic clone.
Medaka no Kyoudai			?		Yes	Yes	Yes	?		Licensed game based on namesake children's show.
Mister Butterfly			Yes		Yes		?			Shoot-'em-up where player, as a machinegun, shoots cocoons with butterflies.
MJ-05	Yes	?	Yes	Yes	?	Yes	Yes			Single-screen shoot-'em-up.
Mystery Mountain			Yes		?		Yes			About climbing to the titular mountain.
Ore no Viking							Yes			Simple shoot-'em-up.
Police Dog	Yes	?		Yes	Yes	?	?			Police-themed scrolling maze game about cathing gorilla burglars as a dog policeman.
Power Fail	Yes	Yes	Yes	?	Yes	Yes	?	?	Basic Master	Maze game about repairing electricity cables while avoiding enemies.
Rowdy Ball							Yes			Breakout clone.
Sasurai no Ninja							Yes			Platform game.
Sea Bomber	Yes	?	?	?	Yes		Yes			Sea-themed single-screen shmup where you target sea animals such as jellyfishes and sharks.
Sky Diver	Yes	?	Yes	?	Yes	?	Yes			Simple parachute game where player shoots monsters.
Space Hamburger							Yes			A Space Invaders clone with hamburgers as enemies.
Square Garden	?	?	?	?	?		Yes		Basic Master	Abstract game about shooting square-shaped "enemies".
Star Dust							Yes			Shoot-'em-up where player, as a satellite dish, has to shoot down enemy satellites and spaceships.
Star Stream		?	Yes	?	?	Yes	Yes			Multi-scrolling space-based shoot-'em-up.
Submarine Shooter	Yes	?	Yes	?	?	?	?			Tunnel based shoot-'em-up.
Super Doors	Yes	Yes	Yes	?	Yes	Yes	Yes			A maze game where every wall can be moved like a door.
Super Golf			Yes		?	?	Yes	?	MZ-700; Multi8	Golf game.
The Spider	Yes		?	?	?	Yes	Yes		SMC-777; Basic Master	Shoot-'em-up.
Vegetable Crash	?	Yes	Yes	Yes	?	Yes	Yes	?	Basic Master; FP-1000; ZX Spectrum	A Space Invaders clone.
Zero Fighter	Yes	Yes	Yes	?	Yes	Yes	Yes	Yes	Basic Master	Simple shmup involving airplanes.

== PC-8800 series ==
- 1983
  - Dezeni Land
- 1984
  - Donkey Kong 3: Dai Gyakushū
  - Mario Bros. Special
  - Nuts & Milk
  - Punch Ball Mario Bros.
  - Salad no Kuni no Tomato Hime
- 1985
  - Balloon Fight
  - Excitebike
  - Golf
  - Ice Climber
  - Tennis
- 1986
  - Super Mario Bros. Special
- 1987
  - Dione
- 1988
  - Halanipla

== X1 ==
- 1984
  - Hanafuda
- 1986
  - Super Mario Bros. Special

== MSX ==
- 1983
  - 3D Bomberman
  - MJ-05
- 1984
  - Machinegun Joe vs the Mafia
  - Nuts & Milk
  - Salad no Kuni no Tomato Hime
- 1985
  - Challenger
  - Star Force
- 1986
  - Hudson's Adventure Island
  - Bomberman Special
  - Star Soldier
- 1987
  - Jagur 5
- 1988
  - Wonder Boy
  - Bomber King

== Amiga ==
- 1991
  - Dynablaster
- 1992
  - BC Kid
- 1993
  - Yo! Joe! - Beat the Ghosts

== IBM PC compatibles ==
- 1991
  - Dynablaster
- 1993
  - Yo! Joe! - Beat the Ghosts

== PC Engine/TurboGrafx-16 ==
- 1987
  - China Warrior
  - Bikkuriman World
  - J.J. & Jeff (Kato-chan & Ken-chan; Japanese version)
  - Shanghai
  - Victory Run
- 1988
  - Jaseiken Necromancer
  - Yū Yū Jinsei
  - R-Type Part I
  - R-Type Part II
  - Sengoku Mahjong
  - Keith Courage in Alpha Zones
  - Sadakichi Sebun: Hideyoshi no Ougon
  - Appare! Gate Ball
  - World Class Baseball
- 1989
  - Dungeon Explorer
  - Military Madness
  - Neutopia
  - Blazing Lazers
  - Bonk's Adventure
  - Power Golf
  - Power League II
  - Susano-ou Densetsu
  - Super Momotaro Dentetsu
- 1990
  - Aero Blasters
  - Aoi Blink
  - Bomberman
  - Chew Man Fu
  - Cratermaze
  - Maniac Pro Wrestling
  - Momotaro Densetsu Turbo
  - Momotaro Densetsu II
  - Momotarō Katsugeki
  - Dragon's Curse
  - Power League III
  - Super Star Soldier
  - Timeball
- 1991
  - Final Soldier
  - Neutopia II
  - Power Eleven
  - Shockman
  - Jackie Chan's Action Kung Fu
  - Bonk's Revenge
  - Populous
  - Power League 4
  - Raiden
  - Super Momotaro Dentetsu II
  - Doraemon Nobita no Dorabian Night
- 1992
  - Soldier Blade
  - World Sports Competition
  - New Adventure Island
  - Bomberman '93
  - Air Zonk
  - Ninja Gaiden
  - Power League V
  - Honō no Tōkyūji: Dodge Danpei
  - Momotaro Densetsu Gaiden Dai Ichi Shu
- 1993
  - Bomberman '94
  - Bonk 3: Bonk's Big Adventure
  - Battle Lode Runner
  - Power League '93
  - Power Tennis

== PC Engine CD ROM/TurboGrafx-CD ==
- 1988
  - No.Ri.Ko Ogawa Noriko
  - Fighting Street
  - Bikkuriman Daijikai
- 1989
  - Cobra - Kokuryū Oh no Densetsu
  - Tengai Makyō Ziria
  - Wonder Boy III: Monster Lair
  - Gambler Jiko Chūshinha - Gekitō 36 Janshi
  - Ys I & II
- 1990
  - Mitsubachi Gakuen
  - Shanghai II
  - Urusei Yatsura: Stay With You
  - J.B. Harold Murder Club
- 1991
  - Cobra II - Densetsu no Otoko
  - Ys III: Wanderers from Ys
  - Seiryū Densetsu Monbit
  - Pomping World
  - Dragon Slayer: The Legend of Heroes
  - Populous: The Promised Lands
  - Super CD-ROM² Taiken Soft Shū
- 1992
  - Tengai Makyō II: Manji Maru
  - Super Raiden
  - Riot Zone
  - Star Parodier
  - Gate of Thunder
  - 1992 Hudson CD-ROM² Ongaku Zenshū
  - Adventure Quiz Capcom World Hatena no Daibōken
  - Records of Lodoss War
  - Doraemon Nobita no Dorabian Night
  - Quiz Nobunaga no Yabō
  - Galaxy Fraulein Yuna
  - Dragon Slayer: The Legend of Heroes II
  - Inoue Mami: Kono Hoshi ni Tatta Hitori no Kimi
- 1993
  - SimEarth
  - Nadia: The Secret of Blue Water
  - Dungeon Explorer II
  - Lords of Thunder
  - Quiz Caravan Cult Q
  - Super Air Zonk: Rockabilly-Paradise
  - Tengai Makyō: Fuun Kabukiden
  - Ys IV: The Dawn of Ys
- 1994
  - Bakuchō Yoshimoto Shinkigeki
  - Power Golf 2
  - The Dynastic Hero
  - Bomberman: Panic Bomber
  - Ryūkō no Ken
  - World Heroes 2
  - Neo Nectaris
  - Garō Densetsu 2
  - Garō Densetsu Special
  - Blood Gear
  - Hyper Wars
  - Records of Lodoss War II
- 1995
  - Kabuki Ittō Ryōdan
  - Gulliver Boy
  - Ginga Ojōsama Densetsu Yuna 2
  - Hyakumonogatari: Honto ni Atta Kowai Hanashi
  - Ginga Fukei Densetsu Sapphire
  - Seiya Monogatari

PC Engine Best Collection refers to a series of video game compilations produced by Hudson Soft and released only in Japan in 2008 for the PlayStation Portable handheld system.

Title	Release	Games included (original system and release)
Ginga Ojousama Densetsu Collection	Jul 30, 2008	Ginga Ojousama Densetsu Yuna (PC Engine Super CD-ROM², 1992); Ginga Ojousama Densetsu Yuna 2: Eternal Princess (PC Engine Super CD-ROM², 1995); Ginga Fukei Densetsu Sapphire (PC Engine Arcade CD-ROM², 1995)
Tengai Makyou Collection	Jul 30, 2008	Tengai Makyou: Ziria (PC Engine CD-ROM², 1989); Tengai Makyou II: Manjimaru (PC Engine Super CD-ROM², 1992); Tengai Makyou: Fuun Kabuki Den (PC Engine Super CD-ROM², 1993)
Soldier Collection	Sep 23, 2008	Super Star Soldier (PC Engine, 1990); Final Soldier (PC Engine, 1991); Soldier Blade (PC Engine, 1992); Star Parodier (PC Engine Super CD-ROM², 1992)

- Note: the Ginga Ojousama Densetsu Yuna franchise is known in the West as Galaxy Fräulein Yuna; Sapphire is in fact unrelated to this franchise (except for sharing the character designer, Mika Akitaka).

== PC Engine SuperGrafx ==
- 1989
  - Battle Ace
- 1990
  - Madō King Granzort
- 1991
  - Aldynes
  - 1941: Counter Attack

== PC-FX ==
- 1994
  - Battle Heat!
  - Team Innocent: The Point of No Return
- 1995
  - Tengai Makyō: Dennō Karakuri Kakutōden
  - Kishin Dōji Zenki FX: Vajra Fight
- 1996
  - Ginga Ojōsama Densetsu Yuna FX: Kanashimi no Sirene

== Famicom/Nintendo Entertainment System ==
- 1984
  - 4 Nin Uchi Mahjong
  - Lode Runner
  - Nuts & Milk
- 1985
  - Binary Land
  - Bomberman
  - Challenger
  - Championship Lode Runner
  - Pooyan
  - Raid on Bungeling Bay
  - Star Force
- 1986
  - Hudson's Adventure Island
  - Milon's Secret Castle
  - Ninja Hattori-kun
  - Star Soldier
  - Doraemon
- 1987
  - Faxanadu
  - Mickey Mousecapade
  - Momotaro Densetsu
  - Robowarrior
  - Starship Hector
  - Takahashi Meijin no Bug-tte Honey
  - The Adventures of Dino Riki
- 1988
  - Momotarō Dentetsu
  - Princess Tomato in the Salad Kingdom
  - Xexyz
- 1989
  - Seirei Gari
- 1990
  - Bikkuriman World: Gekitou Sei Senshi
  - Castle Quest
  - Jackie Chan's Action Kung Fu
  - Klax (Japan; licensed from Tengen)
  - Mashin Eiyuden Wataru Gaiden
  - Mendel Palace
- 1991
  - Adventure Island II
  - Bomberman II
- 1992
  - Adventure Island 3
  - Felix the Cat
  - Super Momotaro Dentetsu
- 1993
  - Bonk's Adventure
  - Momotarou Densetsu Gaiden
- 1994
  - Adventure Island 4

== Game Boy ==
- 1990
  - Bomber Boy
  - Klax
- 1991
  - Jikuu Senki Mu
  - Momotaro Densetsu Gaiden
  - Super Momotaro Dentetsu
- 1992
  - Adventure Island
  - Bonk's Adventure
  - Honō no Dōkyūji: Dodge Danpei
- 1993
  - Adventure Island II: Aliens in Paradise
  - Buster Brothers
  - Castle Quest
  - Felix the Cat
  - Milon's Secret Castle
  - Momotaro Dengeki: Momotaro Thunderbolt
- 1994
  - Bomberman GB / Wario Blast: Featuring Bomberman!
  - Bonk's Revenge
  - GB Genjin Land: Viva! Chikkun Ōkoku
  - Momotaro Dengeki 2: Momotaro Thunderbolt
  - Super Momotaro Dentetsu II
- 1995
  - Bomberman GB 2
- 1996
  - Bomberman Collection
  - Bomberman GB 3
  - Genjin Collection
  - Momotaro Collection
  - Momotaro Collection 2
- 1997
  - Pocket Bomberman
  - Game Boy Wars TURBO
  - SameGame
  - Super B-Daman: Fighting Phoenix
- 1998
  - Daikaijū Monogatari: Miracle of the Zone
  - Game Boy Wars 2
  - Chōsoku Supinā
  - Momotarou Dentetsu Jr.: Zenkoku Ramen Meguri no Maki
  - Nectaris GB
  - Pocket Family GB

== Super Famicom/Super NES ==
- 1991
  - Bill Laimbeer's Combat Basketball
- 1992
  - Earth Light
  - Super Adventure Island
  - Battle Grand Prix
  - Super Momotarou Dentetsu II
- 1993
  - Dig & Spike Volleyball
  - Elfaria
  - Super Bomberman
  - Shin Momotaro Densetsu
  - Inspector Gadget
  - Super Power League
- 1994
  - Super Adventure Island II
  - Hagane: The Final Conflict
  - J.League Super Soccer
  - Super Bonk
  - Super Bomberman 2
  - An American Tail: Fievel Goes West
  - Beauty and the Beast
  - Daikaijū Monogatari
  - Super Momotarou Dentetsu III
  - Super Power League 2
- 1995
  - SWAT Kats
  - J.League Super Soccer '95 Jikkyō Stadium
  - Super Genjin 2 (Super Bonk 2)
  - Super Bomberman 3
  - Far East of Eden Zero
  - Caravan Shooting Collection
  - Crystal Beans From Dungeon Explorer
  - Elfaria 2: The Quest of the Meld
  - Kishin Douji Zenki: Batoru Raiden
  - Kishin Douji Zenki: Denei Raibu
  - Saikyō: Takada Nobuhiko
  - The Sporting News: Power Baseball
  - Super Bomberman: Panic Bomber W
  - Super Momotarou Dentetsu DX
  - Super Power League 3
- 1996
  - Bomberman B-Daman
  - Daikaijū Monogatari 2
  - DoReMi Fantasy: Milon no DokiDoki Daibouken
  - Earth Light: Luna Strike
  - J.League '96 Dream Stadium
  - Kishin Douji Zenki: Tenchi Meidou
  - Momotarou Dentetsu Happy
  - Same Game
  - Super Bomberman 4
  - Super Power League 4
- 1997
  - Bakukyuu Renpatsu!! Super B-Daman
  - Super Bomberman 5

== Sega Mega Drive/Genesis ==
- 1994
  - Mega Bomberman

== Sega Mega-CD/Sega CD ==
- 1995
  - Dungeon Explorer
  - Lords of Thunder
  - The Space Adventure

== Virtual Boy ==
- 1995
  - Panic Bomber
  - Vertical Force

== Game Gear ==
- 1995
  - Super Momotarou Dentetsu III

== Sega Saturn ==
- 1996
  - Kuso Kagaku Sekai Gulliver Boy
  - Saturn Bomberman
  - Ginga Ojousama Densetsu Yuna: Mika Akitaka Illust Works
  - Ginga Ojousama Densetsu Yuna: Remix
- 1997
  - Tengai Makyo: Daiyon no Mokushiroku: The Apocalypse IV
  - Anearth Fantasy Stories: The First Volume
  - Willy Wombat
  - Bulk Slash
  - Koden Koureijutsu Hyaku Monogatari: Hontoni Atta Kowai Hanashi
  - Virus
  - Momotarou Douchuuki
  - Ginga Ojousama Densetsu Yuna 3: Lightning Angel
  - Saturn Bomberman Fight!!
  - Ginga Ojousama Densetsu Yuna: Mika Akitaka Illust Works 2
- 1998
  - Kindaichi Shounen no Jikenbo: Hoshimitou Kanashimi no Hukushuuki
  - Shiroki Majo: Mouhitotsu no Eiyuu Densetsu
  - Denpa Shounenteki Game
  - Bomberman Wars
  - Shadows of the Tusk

== Nintendo 64 ==
- 1997
  - Bomberman 64
  - Dual Heroes
  - J-League Eleven Beat 1997
  - Power League 64
  - Ucchannanchan no Honō no Challenger: Denryū Iraira Bō (Fire Electric Pen)
- 1998
  - Bomberman Hero
  - Centre Court Tennis
  - Getter Love!!
  - Mario Party
  - New Japan Pro Wrestling: Tohkon Road Brave Spirits
  - New Japan Pro Wrestling: Tohkon Road Brave Spirits 2, The Next Generation
  - Star Soldier: Vanishing Earth
  - Super B-Daman: Battle Phoenix 64
- 1999
  - Bomberman 64: The Second Attack
  - Last Legion UX
  - Mario Party 2
  - Robot Ponkottsu 64: Nanatsu no Umi no Caramel
- 2000
  - Mario Party 3
- 2001
  - Bomberman 64

== PlayStation ==
- 1997
  - Bloody Roar
- 1998
  - B.L.U.E. Legend of Water
  - Bomberman Fantasy Race
  - Bomberman Party Edition
  - Bomberman Wars
  - Bomberman World
  - Hello Kitty: White Present
- 1999
  - Bloody Roar 2
  - Pi to Mail
  - Pocket Family: Happy Family Plan
  - Weltorv Estleia
  - Planet Dob
- 2000
  - Bomberman Land
- 2002
  - Digimon Rumble Arena
  - PinobeeIGN

== Game Boy Color ==
- 1998
  - Pocket Bomberman
  - Bomberman Quest
  - Pokémon Trading Card Game
  - Robopon
- 1999
  - Bomberman Max
  - Daikaijuu Monogatari: The Miracle of the Zone II
  - Pocket Family GB2
  - Poyon no Dungeon Room
- 2000
  - Beyblade Fighting Tournament
  - Grandia: Parallel Trippers
  - Poyon no Dungeon Room 2
- 2001
  - Bakuten Shoot Beyblade
  - Game Boy Wars 3
  - Minnie & Friends: Yume no Kuni o Sagashite
  - Pokémon Card GB2: Great Rocket-Dan Sanjō!
- 2002
  - Dr. Rin ni Kiitemite!

== Dreamcast ==
- 1999
  - Kita He: White Illumination
  - Elemental Gimmick Gear
  - Denpa Shounen-teki Kenshou Seikatsu: Nasubi no Heya
  - Kita He: Photo Memories
  - Super Producers: Mezase Show Biz Kai
- 2000
  - Rune Jade
  - Sonic Shuffle
- 2001
  - Typing of the Date
  - Bomberman Online

== PlayStation 2 ==
- 2001
  - Bloody Roar 3
- 2002
  - Bomberman Jetters
  - Drift Champ
- 2003
  - Boboboubo Boubobo: Hajike Matsuri
  - Bomberman Kart
  - Bloody Roar 4
  - Bomberman Land 2
  - DreamMix TV World Fighters
  - Hudson Selection Volume 1: Cubic Lode Runner
  - Hudson Selection Volume 2: Star Soldier
  - Hudson Selection Volume 3: Bonk's Adventure
  - Hudson Selection Volume 4: Adventure Island
- 2004
  - Boboboubo Boubobo: Shuumare! Taikan Boubobo
  - Bomberman Kart DX
  - Sakigake!! Kuromati Koukou - Kore wa Hyottoshite Game Nanoka! Hen
  - Bomberman Battles/Bomberman Hardball
- 2005
- Others
  - Net de Bomberman
  - Kamaitachi no Yoru x3
  - Kita He ~ Diamond Dust ~
  - Momotaro Densetsu 11
  - Momotaro Densetsu 12
  - Momotaro Densetsu 15
  - Momotaro Densetsu 16
  - Momotaro Densetsu USA
  - Momotaro Densetsu X
  - Tengai Makyou II: Manjimaru
  - Tengai Makyou III: Namida

== Game Boy Advance ==
- 2001
  - Bomberman Tournament
  - Mahjong Detective
  - Momotarou Matsuri
  - Morita Shogi Advance
  - Hatena Satena
- 2002
  - Beast Shooter: Mezase Beast King
  - Beyblade
  - Bobobo-bo Bo-bobo: Ougi 87.5 Bakuretsu Hanage Shinken
  - Bomberman Jetters
  - Bomberman Max 2
  - Blender Bros.
  - Pinobee & Phoebee
- 2003
  - Bobobo-bo Bo-bobo: Majide!!? Shinken Shoubu
  - Ninja Five-O
  - Oriental Blue: Ao no Tengai
- 2004
  - Bobobo-bo Bo-bobo: 9 Kiwame Senshi Gyagu Yuugou
  - Bobobo-bo Bo-bobo: Backutou Hajike Taisen
- 2005
  - Hudson Best Collections
  - Mario Party Advance
  - Momotaro Dentetsu G: Gold Deck o Tsukure!

== GameCube ==
- 2002
  - Bloody Roar: Primal Fury
  - Bomberman Generation
  - Bomberman Jetters
  - Disney's Party
  - Mario Party 4
- 2003
  - BeyBlade: Super Tournament Battle
  - Bomberman Land 2
  - DreamMix TV World Fighters
  - Frogger's Adventures: The Rescue
  - Hudson Selection Volume 1: Cubic Lode Runner
  - Hudson Selection Volume 2: Star Soldier
  - Hudson Selection Volume 3: Bonk's Adventure
  - Hudson Selection Volume 4: Adventure Island
  - Mario Party 5
- 2004
  - Mario Party 6
- 2005
  - Frogger: Ancient Shadow
  - Mario Party 7

== Nintendo DS ==
- 2005
  - Bomberman
- 2006
  - Bomberman Land Touch!
  - Honeycomb Beat
- 2007
  - Bomberman Story DS
  - Bomberman Land Touch! 2
  - Mario Party DS
  - Zettai Onkan Otodamaster
- 2008
  - Dungeon Explorer: Warriors of Ancient Arts
  - Bomberman 2
- 2009
  - Metal Fight Beyblade
  - Mezase!! Tsuri Master
  - Miami Law
  - MySims Party
  - Deca Sports DS
- 2010
  - Beyblade: Metal Masters
  - Rooms: The Main Building

=== DSiWare ===
- 2009
  - Sudoku 50! For Beginners (Sudoku Student in North America)
  - Sudoku 150! (Sudoku 150! For Challengers in Europe, Sudoku Master in North America)
  - Illustlogic
  - Bomberman Blitz
- 2010
  - 16 Shot! Shooting Watch

== PlayStation Portable ==
- 2005
  - Rengoku: The Tower of Purgatory
- 2006
  - Sudoku
  - Bomberman
  - Rengoku II: The Stairway to H.E.A.V.E.N.
- 2008
  - Dungeon Explorer: Warriors of Ancient Arts
  - Moeru Mahjong: Moejong!
- 2009
  - Creature Defense

== Xbox 360 ==
- 2006
  - Far East of Eden Ziria: Tales from Distant Jipang
  - Bomberman: Act Zero
- 2007
  - Fuzion Frenzy 2
  - Bomberman Live (Xbox Live Arcade)
  - Omega Five (Xbox Live Arcade)
- 2010
  - Deca Sports Freedom
  - Bomberman Live: Battlefest

== Wii ==
- 2006
  - Kororinpa
  - Wing Island
- 2007
  - Bomberman Land (Wii)
  - Fishing Master
  - Mario Party 8
  - Jigsawpuzzle: Kyo no Wanko
  - Crossword
- 2008
  - Deca Sports
  - Bomberman Blast
  - SimCity Creator
  - Help Wanted
  - Karaoke Joysound Wii
- 2009
  - MySims Party
  - Marble Saga: Kororinpa
  - Deca Sports 2
- 2010
  - Walk It Out! (Note: renamed to Step To The Beat in PAL regions.)
  - Calling
  - Tetris Party Deluxe
  - Lost in Shadow
  - Rooms: The Main Building
  - Deca Sports 3
  - Oops! Prank Party

=== WiiWare ===
- 2008
  - Star Soldier R
  - Bomberman Blast
  - Alien Crush Returns
  - Tetris Party
  - My Aquarium
  - Cue Sports: Snooker vs Billiards
  - Pit Crew Panic!
  - Pop Them, Drop Them, SameGame
- 2009
  - My Planetarium
  - Snowboard Riot
  - Onslaught
  - Water Warfare
  - Adventure Island: The Beginning
- 2010
  - My Aquarium 2
  - Military Madness: Nectaris
  - Diner Dash

== PlayStation 3 ==
- 2009
  - Bomberman Ultra (PlayStation Network)
  - Military Madness: Nectaris (PlayStation Network)
- 2010
  - My Aquarium (PlayStation Network)

== Nintendo 3DS ==
- 2011
  - Deca Sports Extreme
  - Tetris: Axis
  - Nikoli's Pencil Puzzle

== Mobile Phones ==
- 2000
  - Star Soldier
  - Super Star Soldier
  - Daimeikyū Kumikyoku (大迷宮組曲)
- 2000
  - MailDrama Cosmos (MailDrama コスモス)
- 2001
  - SameGame (さめがめ)
  - Cannonball (キャノンボール, Kyanonbōru)
  - Miracle Golf (みらくるゴルフ, Mirakuru gorufu)
  - Miracle Quest (ミラクルくえすと, Mirakuru kuesuto)
  - Tamarin DX (タマリンDX)
  - Binary Land (バイナリィランド, Bainaryirando)
  - Burokkusumasshu (ブロックスマッシュ)
  - Kajino kingu (カジノKING)
  - Sen nō dōjō (線脳道場)
  - Hōrai Gakuen' No Bōken (蓬莱学園の冒険)
  - SUPER i-soccer
- 2002
  - Kuru pita! Kakuzō (クルぴた！カクゾー)
  - Chakushin ☆ Sutajiamu (着信☆スタジアム)
  - Gettaipingurabu!! 2 (ゲッタイピングラブ!!２)
  - Sky Glider (スカイグライダー, Sukai Guraidā)
- 2003
  - Finisterre (フィニステル)
  - Jare Neko (じゃれねこ)
  - Mugen Takoage (無限凧あげ)
  - Naisu Dātsu (ナイスダーツ)
  - Morita Shōgi (森田将棋)
  - Shinrei Kyōfu Tsūshin (心霊恐怖通信)
  - Golio 13 (iゴルゴ13)
  - Yatterman (ヤッターマン)
  - The Genie Family (クッキング大魔王)
  - Tsubame-fū - ENFU - (燕風-ENFU-)
  - Miracle Quest 2 (ミラクルくえすと2, Mirakuru Kuesuto Tsu)
  - Bomberman Jetters Mobile
- 2004
  - Tengai Makyō: Ziria
  - Elemental Monster (エレメンタル モンスター, Erementaru Monsutā)
  - Suzume Pai Pazuru (雀牌パズル)
  - Reis Hunter (レイスハンター, Reisu Hantā)
  - Millionaire (大富豪, Daifūgō)
  - Kenchiku no Takumi (建築の匠)
  - Panic Bomber (ぱにっくボンバー)
  - Mahha GoGoGo (マッハGoGoGo)
  - Taisen ☆ Bomberman (対戦☆ボンバーマン)
  - CC7
- 2005
  - Bomberman RPG
  - Sapuri no Jikan (サプリの時間)
  - Momotarou Dentetsu Tokyo
  - Momotarou Dentetsu Japan
- 2006
  - Bonk's Return
  - Real3D SnowBoard
  - Star Soldier vs DoDonPachi DaiOuJou CARAVAN'06
  - Momotarou Dentetsu WORLD
  - Momotaro Dentetsu CHUBU
  - Maniac Pro Wrestling
  - Moeru Mahjong Nyuumon-hen: Moejong! (萌える麻雀入門編 もえじゃん!)
- 2007
  - Gacha wa shi Meijin no Bōken Jima (ガチャはし名人の冒険島)
  - Gachapin & Mukku no Ribāshi (ガチャピン＆ムックのリバーシ)
  - Gachapin & Mukku no Otsukai (ガチャピン＆ムックのおつかい)
  - Bomberman Kart 3D
  - Maware Chikyū! (まわれ地球！)
  - Moeru Mahjong Jissen-hen: Moejong! (萌える麻雀実践編 もえじゃん!)
  - Moeru Mahjong Chou Jissen-hen: Moejong! (萌える麻雀「超」実践編 もえじゃん!2)
  - Momotarou Dentetsu KANTO
  - Momotarou Dentetsu TOHOKU
- 2008
  - Momotaro Dentetsu HOKKAIDO
  - R20 ☆ Moe Bomberman (R20☆萌えボンバーマン)
  - Gachapin & Mukku no Dai Undōkai (ガチャピン＆ムックの大運動会)
  - Miracle Quest: Dokodemo Danjon (ミラクルくえすと～どこでもダンジョン～, Mirakuru kuesuto ~Dokodemo Danjon~)
  - Moeru Mahjong: Moejong! Special (萌える麻雀 もえじゃん!すぺしゃる)
- 2009
  - Super Gachapin ☆ bomberman (Superガチャピン☆ボンバーマン)
  - Momotarou Dentetsu KYUSHU
  - Momotarou Dentetsu SETOUCHI
- 2010
  - Adventure Island Quest by Takahashi Meijin (高橋名人の冒険島クエスト)
  - Takahashi meijin no chōsen-jō (高橋名人の挑戦状)
  - Bomberman Next gotouji Kantou-hen (ボンバーマンNext ご当地関東編)
  - Momotaro Dentetsu KINKI
  - STAR SOLDIER MISSION MODE
  - Momotaro Dentetsu AOMORI
- 2011
  - Momotaro Dentetsu SHIZUOKA
- 2012
  - Momotaro Dentetsu TOKAI

=== iOS ===
- 2008
  - Aqua Forest
  - Bomberman Touch
  - Catch The Egg
  - FB-GIRLs
  - Hanafuda-kyo
  - Happy Face Popper
  - Mahjong Police
  - NeoSameGame
  - Puzzloop
  - Slyder Adventures
  - Do The Hudson!!
- 2009
  - Bomberman Touch 2
  - Cake Mania 3
  - Crayon Physics Deluxe
  - Shot Watch
- 2011
  - Bomberman Dojo
  - Bomberman Chains
  - Crows x Worst: Saikyō Densetsu

=== Android ===
- 2008
  - Charlene’s Beachside
