= Dezeni Land =

- Developer: Hudson Soft
- Publisher: Hudson Soft
- Platforms: FM-7, MSX, MZ-1500, PC-6001, PC-8001, PC-8801, PC-9801, Sharp X1
- Release: JP: October 1983
- Genre: Adventure

Dezeni Land (Note: Japanese: デゼニランド, Hepburn: Dezenirando) is a 1983 adventure game developed by Hudson Soft. It was part of an early wave of adventure games in Japan and was Hudson Soft's first game in the genre. The game involves a humorous story about a player entering an amusement park and trying to escape with the treasure they can find in the area. The game was influenced by the opening of Tokyo Disneyland in the same year.

Dezeni Land sold particularly well and was released across various Japanese personal computers lines. The success of the game changed the way Hudson developed games after, with a focus on making stronger individual titles instead of a large quantity of games at once. Akira Yamashita, in his 1987 book on adventure games, complimented it as one of the best adventure games released in Japan, and the game was included in an overview of the best PC games of the 1980s in Asocon in 1990. The developers of the game followed it up with two other humorous adventure games for Hudson Soft with Princess Tomato in the Salad Kingdom and a sequel, Dezeni World the following year.

== Gameplay ==
Dezeni Land is a humorous fantasy-themed adventure game. It is set in an amusement park. The goal is for the player to make their way through the game's six attractions and find the treasures that lie within, and then escape the park.

The player controls the actions in the game through a text parser. Most of the text is in Japanese, while the user input is handled in English.

== Development ==
Japan released its first adventure game with Omotesandō Adventure in 1982, which was released for the personal computer (PC) market. By the latter half of 1982, other Japanese magazines began to feature adventure games that would slowly spread throughout Japan, which in turn created the first boom period for adventure games in the country. Hudson Soft was one of the earliest companies to begin developing adventure games in Japan with Dezeni Land. It was Hudson Soft's first adventure game. In April 1983, the employees of the company visited Tokyo Disneyland, which had just opened. This led to the creation of the game Dezeni Land. Each of the attractions to escape from in the game are patterned after areas of Tokyo Disneyland that were present at the time.

The game was developed by the duo Takashi Takebe and Shinichi Nakamoto. Takashi Takebe joined Hudson after graduating from Hokkai Gakuen University in the late 1970s. Takebe was in charge of the scenario, design, and programming for Dezeni Land.

The title is a Japanese wordplay pun with "Dezeni" sounding like "Disney", but when spelled in kanji, it roughly means "a display of wealth".

== Release ==
Dezeni Land was released in October 1983. In Japan, the game sold about 50,000 copies in an era when hit games would sell about 10,000 copies. It was released for various Japanese home computers, including FM-7, PC-6001, PC-8001, PC-8801, PC-9801, MZ-1500, MSX, S1, Sharp X1. It was ported to the SPC-1000 computers in Korea under the title Disney Land.

In an overview of the game in Asocon magazine, they wrote that the parody-themed nature of the game caused "quite a stir".

Up until around May 1983, Hudson Soft was releasing about 20 new software titles every month. With the success of Dezeni Land, the company began to switch focus more to individual titles than releasing large amounts of games.

The two developers followed the game up with two further adventure games, first with Princess Tomato in the Salad Kingdom (1984), followed by a sequel to Dezeni Land with Dezeni World (1984).

== Reception ==
Akira Yamashita wrote in Super Soft Magazine that Hudson Soft put a lot of effort into the game, which was shown through the speed at which the screen generated its images. Yamashita continued that the story development and graphics were all top-notch, and it was one of the finest Japanese adventure games.

In March 1985, Technopolis published their poll on their readers favourite personal computer games. Each reader was allowed to submit five games. Dezeni Land placed in fifth place on the list. In an overview of PC games from the 1980s, an Asocon magazine writer found the game was thoroughly funny throughout its playtime, and was refreshing for an era of such bleak and brutal games.

Tomoaki Mori of Square Enix discussed early Japanese adventure games in 2022. He highlighted Dezeni Land as a game that showed the limitations of computers at a time when the commands had to be typed in English. This was done with a scene in the game where the player has to place a cross on a cross-shaped indentation. Typing English phrases such as "Set Cross" or "Put Cross" offers no response, with only "Attach Cross" being accepted despite having the same general meaning.

== See also ==
- List of Hudson Soft games
