= Robopon 2 =

Robopon 2 Ring Version; Robopon 2 Cross Version
- North American cover art for both versions, depicting the Robopon Sun-02 (top) and SunZero (bottom)
- Developer: Red Company
- Publishers: JP: Hudson Soft; NA: Atlus
- Platform: Game Boy Advance
- Release: JP: September 13, 2001; NA: June 11, 2002
- Genre: Role-playing
- Modes: Single-player, multiplayer

Robopon 2 Ring Version (Note: Japanese: ロボットポンコッツ2 リングバージョン, Hepburn: Robot Ponkottsu 2 Ringu Bājon) and Robopon 2 Cross Version (Note: Japanese: ロボットポンコッツ2 クロスバージョン, Hepburn: Robot Ponkottsu 2 Kurosu Bājon) are Role-playing video games developed by Red Company for the Game Boy Advance. Like their predecessor, Robopon (1998), both versions were released simultaneously and feature interconnectivity with each other. Originally published by Hudson Soft in Japan in 2001, the games were localized and released in North America by Atlus in 2002.

== Gameplay ==
Within both versions of Robopon 2, Robopon can be created by finding different types of batteries and combining them (this process in known as "sparking"). Each different combination of batteries produces a different type of Robopon. Robopon 2 also builds upon the battle system of the first game by implementing four-on-four battles, allowing the player's whole party of Robopon to participate in one big battle. Subsequently, targeting certain enemies within battles becomes crucial. Another less drastic change from Robopon is the ability to change the colour of the player's Robopon.

== Story ==
After the events of the first game, the now number one Legend of Porombo Island, Cody, sets out for new lands and new titles, but forgets his Robopon. Before he can turn back to retrieve them, his boat is wrecked in a storm, and he washes up on the continent of Majiko. He decides to become the Robopon champion of this land; however, in order to do this, he must obtain the one-of-a-kind XStones and challenge the rank-holders of Majiko. As he collects the XStones, however, he finds the towns of Majiko are troubled by events past and present, and he must travel through time between the world of 20 years ago and the present to make things right.

== Reception ==
Reception

Aggregate score
Aggregator	Score
Metacritic	(Ring) 70/100 (Cross) 68/100

Review scores
Publication	Score
AllGame	3.5/5
Famitsu	6/10, 6/10, 6/10, 6/10
Game Informer	7/10
GamePro	3.5/5
GameSpot	7.8/10
IGN	7/10
Nintendo Power	2/5, 2.5/5, 2.5/5, 2.5/5, 2.5/5

Both Robopon 2 games received "average" reviews according to video game review aggregator Metacritic.

In Nintendo Power, the overview said that while the first game separated itself from being a Pokemon derivative was its built in infrared support. They found that while this game lacked this unique feature, it was still a step forward due to it including over 180 new Robopon, four-player mini-games and three times the areas to explore.

GameSpot named Robopon 2 the second-best Game Boy Advance game of August 2002.
