= Nuts & Milk =

1983 video game

- MSX box art (EU)
- Developers: Hudson Soft; KG Telecom (mobile)
- Publishers: JP/NA/EU: Hudson Soft; JP: KG Telecom; NA: Living Mobile
- Platforms: MSX, NEC PC-6001mkII, NEC PC-8001mkII, NEC PC-8801, Sharp X1, Sharp MZ-2200, FM-7, Hitachi S1, Sony SMC-777, Pasopia 7, Family Computer, Commodore 64, mobile phones
- Release: 1983: MSX; JP: 1983; EU: 1983 FM-7; JP: 1983 NEC PC-6001mkII; JP: 1983 NEC PC-8001mkII; JP: 1983 NEC PC-8801; JP: June 1984 Family Computer; JP: July 20, 1984 Sharp X1; JP: 1984 Commodore 64; EU: 1984 (Hudson Soft); EU: 1985 (Melbourne House); AU: 1985 Mobile phones; JP: March 18, 2002 (i-mode); NA: July 17, 2003; JP: September 1, 2003 DoJa; EU: June 2003 Virtual Console Wii; JP: November 20, 2007 (Wii) Nintendo 3DS; JP: July 17, 2013 Wii U; JP: November 19, 2014
- Genre: Puzzle-platform
- Modes: Single-player, two players

Nuts & Milk (ナッツ&ミルク, Nattsu ando Miruku) is a puzzle-platform game developed and published by Japanese software developer Hudson Soft in 1983. The game was first released on Japanese home computers such as the MSX, NEC PC-6001mkII, Sharp X1, Fujitsu FM-7, Hitachi S1 and later to the Family Computer in Japan. Along with Lode Runner, it was the first third-party video game to be released on a Nintendo console.

== Gameplay ==
Both versions of Nuts & Milk involve the player moving through various levels while collecting an assortment of fruit scattered throughout each of them. By gathering all the fruit on a particular screen, the player will gain access to a previously unopened house door containing Milk's fiancée, Yogurt. When the player makes contact with the female blob, they are advanced to the next level to start the process anew. Movement through these levels is accomplished by using the directional pad or keyboard to move Milk across the stage while avoiding pitfalls and other obstacles, most notably the character's rival, Nuts. If contact is made at any time during game play with Nuts or other harmful objects such as miniature blimps, the player will lose a life and have to restart the current level, with all fruit reset back to their initial positions. Once all three of Milk's lives are lost in this fashion, the game ends.

In the Famicom version, Milk can jump a short distance vertically or horizontally, allowing him to traverse pits or quickly gain access to an adjacent platform. If the player falls from too great a distance, Milk will become momentarily dazed and unable to move until the player joggles him awake with the jump button. Rope bridges are suspended in mid-air on most levels, and by using the directional pad, the player can climb them up or down as well as walk across them once they reach the top. In all, 50 individual levels exist on the Famicom version, and each one can be skipped freely by pressing the select button. Once a player has cycled through all fifty of them, he will return to the first level and restart the sequence until all of Milk's lives are lost.

The Famicom and MSX version also contain a level editor mode where the player can freely edit the first stage of the game by placing objects or enemies on the screen for Milk to interact with. This stage then takes the place of the first level in normal game play until the console is reset.

== Plot ==
Set in a fantasy world, Nuts & Milk follows the story of a pink male blob named Milk, who must find his fiancée, Yogurt, a similar pink blob with a red hair bow, and rescue her from Nuts, a teal blob who also vies for her affection. The journey will take Milk through several levels where the process of finding and saving his love will repeat itself several times as Nuts mounts an ever-present resistance against his quest for romance.

== Development ==
Originally developed by Japanese software company Hudson Soft for several home computers in Japan, Nuts & Milk became one of the company's first Family Computer video games along with Lode Runner. The game itself borrows elements from Lode Runner, an earlier Hudson project, and other arcade-styled platformers such as Donkey Kong, and even emulates the title screen of Nintendo's early 1980s releases. While the game retains stylistic similarities to other games published at the time, it is unique in being an arcade-styled game that was never released on an actual arcade system.

Two different versions of the game were created: one for home computers, and one for the Famicom.

=== Version differences ===
The MSX (top) and Famicom versions

Nuts & Milk was released for the home computers and Nintendo's Famicom at roughly the same time, and although both versions are very similar, there are a few differences in presentation. The Famicom version is played from a sideways angle typical of 2D sidescrollers with the player walking and jumping from one area to another horizontally. Conversely, the computer version is presented in a top-down fashion with all platforming elements removed, with the player instead moving in four directions. This version also contains a slight degradation in both sound and graphics, due to the comparatively less powerful personal computers at the time. Though the Famicom version makes use of its standard 2-button controller, the computer releases instead rely on a keyboard.

=== Music ===
The music for both versions of Nuts & Milk was composed internally by Hudson Soft and is made up entirely of synth-based chiptunes, a common audio medium for early video games. Though an exclusive soundtrack for either game was never released, the music from both versions can be found on the 1987 compilation album Hudson Game Music (catalog number 28XA-87) released in Japan by Alfa and GMO Records.

== Ports ==
Hudson Soft ported the Famicom version to the Commodore 64. It was first released, only in the United Kingdom, in 1984 as Hot Pop and was later re-released by Melbourne House in the United Kingdom and Australia.

An unofficial port, developed in the Czech Republic, was released on the Atari 8-bit in 2010 under the name of Milk Nuts.

== Legacy ==
A version of Nuts & Milk resembling the Famicom release has since been ported to mobile phones as a download service beginning on September 1, 2003, in Japan by KG Telecom as part of their "GameMaster" compilation, which contains other Hudson Soft games from the 8-bit era. The service was later extended to other parts of the world in January 2004 by TF1 i-games.

In December 2005, Hudson included Nuts & Milk in Hudson Collection Vol. 4: Nazotoki Collection for the Game Boy Advance, released exclusively in Japan. Nintendo would release the Famicom version of the game on the Wii, 3DS and Wii U through the Virtual Console.
