= Princess Tomato in the Salad Kingdom =

1984 video game

- North American NES box art
- Developer: Hudson Soft
- Publisher: Hudson Soft
- Composer: Tomotsune Maeno
- Platforms: NEC PC-8801, NEC PC-6001mkII, PC-8001mkII, PC-98, FM-7, MSX, NES/Famicom, Hitachi S1, Sharp MZ-1500, Sony SMC-777, Virtual Console
- Release: Home computers: Japan: 1984; NES/Famicom: Japan: May 27, 1988; NA: February 1991
- Genre: Adventure
- Mode: Single-player

Princess Tomato in the Salad Kingdom (サラダの国のトマト姫, Sarada no Kuni no Tomato Hime) is a video game by Hudson Soft originally released in 1984 for the NEC PC-8801, NEC PC-6001, FM-7 and MSX Japanese home computers.

It was ported on May 27, 1988, to the Famicom, and February 8, 1991 for the Nintendo Entertainment System in North America. It was also released on the Wii's Virtual Console in Japan on January 19, 2010, and in North America on February 8. Further Japanese Virtual Console releases followed on September 9, 2012 for the Nintendo 3DS, and on May 14, 2014 for the Wii U.

The characters are primarily cartoon-like anthropomorphic fruits and vegetables, though the game does contain some human characters, including Princess Tomato's sister, Lisa, and the villainous Farmies.

== Plot ==
The Garlic Wanderer in Orange Park

In the Salad Kingdom, a peaceful land whose inhabitants are all anthropomorphic foods, the royal advisor Minister Pumpkin stages a coup and kidnaps Princess Tomato, causing her father King Broccoli to die of grief. Before his passing, he tasks Sir Cucumber the knight to rescue Tomato, promising him her hand in marriage should he succeed. Cucumber agrees and sets out towards the Zucchini Mountains to rescue the princess and stop Pumpkin and his Farmies from taking over the kingdom. He is aided along the way by his sidekick, Percy the baby persimmon, and a resistance force led by Tomato's younger brother, Prince Lettuce.

== Gameplay ==
Princess Tomato in the Salad Kingdom plays similarly to a text adventure, though due to the NES's lack of a keyboard accessory, the possible commands are represented by buttons which line both sides of the screen. The commands are fixed and do not change during gameplay. Primarily, the game consists of still screens, with the exception of the "finger wars", mazes and occasional animated character, such as the octoberry and fernbirds. Players can issue commands to the game's protagonist. While the player may run into difficulty determining which actions will advance the game, the only way to "lose" is by failing to defeat the penultimate boss, Minister Pumpkin, in a game of "finger wars".

== Release and reception ==
Reception

Review scores
Publication	Score
Electronic Gaming Monthly	7/10, 5/10, 6/10, 5/10
Famitsu	7/10, 7/10, 8/10, 7/10
Famicom Hisshobon	2/5

Princess Tomato in the Salad Kingdom was released for the Famicom on May 27, 1988.

Reviewing the Famicom release, two reviewers in Biweekly Famicom Tsūshin said that the game has been updated since its home computer release with better selection commands and while one reader said it was written in an "easy-to-read" kanji, the text could use more subtlety. The reviewer in Famicom Hisshobon said it had changed so much, it might as well be a new game.

Three of the reviewers complimented the story and setting and themes as making the game fun and cute. One review in Famicom Hisshobon disliked the gameplay elements of a 3D maze and the Rock Paper Scissors efforts were obnoxious and the graphics were below average, saying that even Princess Tomato is not even cute.

== Legacy ==
Princess Tomato makes an appearance in Super Bomberman R as a playable DLC character named "Princess Tomato Bomber". She was added in the 2.0 update released in November 2017.

== See also ==
- List of Nintendo Entertainment System games
- List of Hudson Soft games
