= Binary Land =

1983 video game

- Japanese Famicom cover art
- Developer: Hudson Soft
- Publisher: Hudson Soft
- Platforms: MSX, FM-7, PC-6001mkII, NEC PC-8801, Sharp MZ-2200, Sharp MZ-5500, Sharp X1, Famicom
- Release: 1983
- Genre: Puzzle
- Mode: Single-player

Binary Land (バイナリィランド, Bainarī Rando) is a puzzle video game developed by Hudson Soft in 1983 for the MSX, FM-7, PC-6001mkII, NEC PC-8801, Sharp MZ-2200, Sharp MZ-5500, Sharp X1 and in 1985 for the Famicom. The MSX version saw release in Japan by Hudson Soft and in Europe by Kuma Computers Ltd in 1984.

While the Famicom version has 99 levels, there is no ending screen implemented in the game.

== Gameplay ==
Gameplay screenshot

In the Famicom version of the game, players have to unite two penguins, Gurin (male) and Malon (female), who are in love. The MSX and PC version features a human boy and a human girl; gameplay remains identical to the Famicom version. Players control Malon and Gurin simultaneously, with a timer adding to the difficulty. These penguins move in mirror images of each other. After completing the 17th stage, players have to start over again on stage 1. Je te veux by Erik Satie is the background music in the game during the levels. Upon uniting the two penguins, Beethoven's "Ode to Joy" is played.

A top-down view is used in the game, similar to the method used in The Adventures of Lolo. Standing in the penguins' paths are spiders, birds and other creatures which the player must attack with the penguins' spray. Cobwebs occupy some of the cells on the playing field, possibly slowing the player down long enough for a spider to kill either Gurin or Malon. With each level arranged on a 10-by-15 grid and a vertical wall separating the two penguins from each other, only the upper central cell is free for both characters to reach. This "free cell" always holds the caged heart that is required to complete the level. A row of walls surrounds each player in a maze-like environment. In order to make the challenges more difficult, they are unbalanced and offer a different experience for Gurin and Malon. Should Gurin or Malon become trapped in a cobweb, they are helpless until the player navigates the maze, crosses the free cell and then enters the other penguin's side of the maze to free them from the web with their spraycan.

Should the player reach a high enough score, the player is asked to put their name on a list of the five highest scores of that session.
