= Galaxy Fraulein Yuna (video game) =

1992 video game

- PC Engine cover art
- Developer: Red Company
- Publisher: Hudson Soft
- Series: Galaxy Fräulein Yuna
- Platforms: PC Engine Super CD-ROM², Sega Saturn
- Release: PC Engine Super CD-ROM²: JP: October 23, 1992; Sega Saturn: JP: December 27, 1996
- Genre: Adventure

Galaxy Fraulein Yuna (Note: Japanese: 銀河お嬢様伝説ユナ, Hepburn: Ginga Ojōsama Densetsu Yuna; lit. 'Galaxy Lady Legend Yuna') is a 1992 adventure game by Red Company for the PC Engine Super CD-ROM². The game is set in Neo-Tokyo in the 23rd Century and features a teenage girl Yuna who not only wins a singing contest to become an idol, but is granted a new super suit to protect her battles against the Queen of Darkness and her army of minions.

On its release, it received middling scores in Famicom Tsūshin and better scores in Gekkan PC Engine. The game received spawned the Galaxy Fräulein Yuna franchise which included sequels, ports, and two anime miniseries.

== Plot and gameplay ==
Galaxy Fraulein Yuna is set in the 23rd century in Neo-Tokyo and features a sixteen-year-old girl named Yuna Kagurazaka. She wins a singing contest which turns her into an idol. She is also suddenly visited by a robotic fairy named Elner, who deems her to be the "Saviour of Light" and grants her special powers, including a suit that allows her to transform. The powers grant her abilities to protect her against the evil Queen of Darkness and her minions, the Thirteen Frauleins of Darkness.

PC Engine Fan magazine and video game journalist Kurt Kalata described the game as an adventure game. Hirokazu Hamamura of Famicom Tsūshin described the game as a bishōjo game. There were many bishōjo games made and ported to the PC-Engine starting with the port of the eroge role-playing game Dragon Knight II by the ELF Corporation in 1992. The game was also described as a "digital comic" in PC Engine Fan magazine. Carl Therrien, author of The Media Snatcher (2019) described digital comics as a generic expression which began circulating following the release of Snatcher to attune players to the expectations of the limited gameplay in some titles.

== Development ==
"Mobile Suit" girl was a type of character invented in the early 1980s, which involved cute girls cosplaying as Gundam robots called mechs. This theme is the premise for Galaxy Fräulein Yuna. It was developed by Red Company and published by Hudson Soft.

Mika Akitaka was an anime artist. Their first work was on a game titled Cruise Chaser Blassty (1986). They were approached by Hudson Soft to work on the Fraulein Yuna. The characters in the game are similar to MS Girl comic, which featured young girls dressed as Gundams.

== Release and reception ==
PC-Engine Reception

Review scores
Publication	Score
Famitsu	6/10, 5/10, 5/10, 5/10
Gekkan PC Engine	85/100, 80/100, 85/100, 75/100, 70/100
Marukatsu PC Engine	7/10, 7/10, 7/10, 7/10

Galaxy Fraulein Yuna was first released in Japan for the PC Engine Super CD-ROM² on October 23, 1992.

A reviewer in Marukatsu PC Engine said that people will either love of hate Galaxy Fraulein Yuna. As Hamamura of Famicom Tsūshin described the game as a bishōjo game, he said that "the target audience of the game is made clear" and said that regardless of the score he gave, audiences for these kind of games would buy it regardless. Another reviewer in the magazine said the game would have a very small audience and did not understand the appeal of it. A reviewer in Gekkan PC Engine similarly only recommended it to those who found the character design appealing, saying that it "may sound harsh, but that's how clear the game is." One reviewer in Famicom Tsūshin said as there are no game over-scenarios in Galaxy Fraulein Yuna, players could just aimlessly push buttons which may be painful for audiences not into these kind of games.

Reviewers commented on the story and characters. One reviewer in Gekkan PC Engine said the conversations between the characters were appealing, while a Famicom Tsūshin reviewer said that the conversations between the characters Yuna and Elna at first are amusing, then quickly grew annoying. One reviewer in Gekkan PC Engine said that Yuna would have players laughing until the very end, while another saying Yuna's voice actress was so over-the-top that it sent shivers down their spine. Two reviewers in Gekkan PC Engine felt the cut-scenes in the game ruined the flow of the game and that long loading times slowed down the gameplay.

On Famitsu's 30th anniversary, they polled their readers asking what video game was the most memorable from their respective consoles. With 2,921 ballots, Galaxy Fraulein Yuna was voted 10th for the PC Engine.

=== Ports ===
Reception

Review score
Publication	Score
Famitsu	6/10, 4/10, 5/10, 4/10 (SS)

Galaxy Fraulein Yuna received sequels, re-releases, and ports, for platforms like the Sega Saturn, PlayStation, and PlayStation Portable. The original publisher, Hudson Soft, merged with Konami Digital Entertainment in 2012 and renewed their copyright on the title in 2023.

A port of the game was released for the Sega Saturn as Galaxy Fraulein Yuna Remix (Note: 銀河お嬢様伝説ユナRemix, Ginga Ojōsama Densetsu Yuna Remix; lit. 'Galaxy Lady Legend Yuna Remix') on December 27, 1996. The game maintains the gameplay and scenario of the original release while changing the graphics and adding video sequences.

Among the four reviewers in Famitsu, one said Galaxy Fraulein Yuna Remix had improved graphics over the original game. Another said that the visuals resemble still resemble older PC games while one said the graphics and direction of the battle sequences were sloppy. Two reviewers commented found the game to have shallow gameplay with one saying that as a digital comic, all you did was push buttons and another saying that the battle sequences had gameplay so shallow that their inclusion was questionable.

== See also ==
- List of Hudson Soft games
- List of TurboGrafx-16 games
