= Getter Love!! =

1998 video game

- Cover art, featuring Reika Kongouji from behind
- Developer: Hudson Soft
- Publisher: Hudson Soft
- Director: Masato Tobisawa
- Producer: Hidetoshi Endo
- Designer: Kokoro Nakamura
- Programmer: Kimihiro Nishino
- Artist: Akihiro Shibata
- Writers: Katsunori Takahashi; Kazumi Katou
- Composer: Shohei Bando
- Platform: Nintendo 64
- Release: JP: December 3, 1998
- Genres: Party, dating sim
- Modes: Single player, multiplayer

Getter Love!! (Note: Japanese: ゲッターラブ!!, Hepburn: Gettārabu!!) (Note: Also known as Getter Love!! Chō Renai Party Game (ゲッターラブ!! ちょー恋愛パーティゲーム, Gettārabu!! Chō Ren'ai Pātigēmu; lit. 'Getter Love!! The Ultimate Dating Party Game') and Getter Love!! Panda Love Unit) is a dating sim party video game developed and published by Hudson Soft for the Nintendo 64. Gameplay revolves around four players competing to be the first to get a girlfriend by successfully romancing their female classmates. It was released only in Japan in December 1998, and received mixed critical reception. To promote the release, Hudson arranged an idol group based on the characters. A few typing-themed spinoffs were released between 2001 and 2002. An unofficial fan translation was released in December 2023.

== Gameplay ==
In Getter Love!!, all players and NPCs move across a map simultaneously during SAMS gameplay segments.

In Getter Love!!, players control a male freshman at Panda High School, who is competing with his friends to get a girlfriend before the end of their summer vacation. Players can customize their name, hairstyle, and personality type. The goal is for players to build up connections with the female NPCs, with the intent of eventually declaring their love. The first player who obtains a girlfriend wins the game. There are seven romanceable girls, collectively known as the "Panda Love Unit": trendy Ayumi Shirai, childish Natsuki Itou, free-spirited Hana Tsuzuki, standoffish Makoto Minagawa, shy Kiiro Amami, sickly Shizuku Morimura, and excitable Meihua Lee. Each girl has different personality traits, favorite locations, and topics of interest. Alfonso Roberto Martini, an Italian exchange student, is the host who explains the rules and provides updates on the players' current standings throughout the game.

At the start of each game, one of the girls is designated as already being an acquaintance of the players, making her slightly easier to romance. Players are given a time limit of two in-game weeks to successfully confess their love to one of the girls; if no one succeeds before time runs out, the game ends in a draw. Each day is split into three phases during which the players can act: morning, evening, and night. During each of these phases, each player selects an area on the map to visit, with all players and NPCs moving to their destinations simultaneously after the last selection has been made, known as the Simultaneous Activity Map System (SAMS) mechanic. During SAMS segments, players have a limited ability to dash, to arrive for a date early or reach a destination before a rival, or brake, to avoid running into someone and triggering an unwanted interaction.

When a player enters a location, they may encounter NPCs that can alter the player's stats, offer information about the girls, or grant "topic balls" which can be used to start conversations during dates. Items can also be purchased from shops, which can be given as gifts to the girls or used to interfere with rivals. If the player encounters a girl, they can chat with her, offer her a gift, or ask her out on a date. Players earn love points by talking to girls, giving them gifts, or using topic balls during a date, with gifts and topics the girl likes being worth more points. Conversely, choosing topics the girl dislikes or missing an arranged date costs the player love points. During dates, special events may occur that can significantly increase the number of love points earned.

During gameplay, players must manage an appearance meter, which loses them love points if they do not maintain their hygiene; a stamina meter, which can cause them to miss dates if not sufficiently rested; and money, which can be spent on items and dates. A battle minigame takes place when two players enter the same location. The winner can steal a rival's items, topic balls, or money. An eighth girl, self-obsessed Reika Kongouji, can also engage in unsolicited attachment toward any of the players, causing her to lower the player's stats and ruin dates with the other girls when she is encountered. Any time they encounter a girl, players can choose to confess their love. The player's success is determined by whether they have earned sufficient love points. Each girl has four different possible endings that can be earned based on the number of love points the player has accrued with them; the best ending requires the most points, which will cause the girl to confess to the player instead.

The standard game mode can be played in single-player against CPU-controlled rivals Chikashi Yoshikawa, Daisuke Sato, and Sesshuu Nakayama, or in multiplayer for up to four players. There are also two alternate multiplayer modes: one in which players all compete for the same girl's affections, and one in which players attempt to earn the most cummulative love points from all the girls. A battle mode allows players to play any of the battle minigames. A "Memories" menu allows players to replay any of the topic balls, special events, or endings that they have encountered in previous games.

== Development and release ==
Getter Love!!'s concept originated in December 1995 with designer Kokoro Nakamura, who had been attempting to come up with ideas for a four-player competitive game for the then-nascent Nintendo 64. Noting the popularity of romance games like Tokimeki Memorial (1994) at the time, Nakamura decided to adapt the genre for a multiplayer format. The game's title and the characters' names were chosen through name divination. At one point, the development team considered including as many as 50 possible love interests. Some of the non-datable NPCs were based directly on members of the development team. Nakamura noted that Makoto was the most popular girl among Hudson Soft employees.

Getter Love!! appeared as part of Hudson's lineup at the 1998 Tokyo Game Show, and was released on December 3 of that year. To promote the game leading up to release, Hudson held an audition on September 24 for actresses to portray the members of the Panda Love Unit in an idol group of the same name. The seven winners were spotlighted in issues of Dengeki Nintendo 64 and The 64 Dream, and held a live concert in Meguro on December 24, with subscribers of the magazines granted free admission. On December 18, Pony Canyon released a Getter Love!! soundtrack album containing music tracks from the game, some of which had been given new lyrics written by Kaori Morikawa of the Go-Bang's and performed by Panda Love Unit, as well as tracks featuring character dialogue from the game recorded by the group's members.

== Reception and legacy ==
Reception

Review scores
Publication	Score
Famitsu	26/40
N64 Magazine	2/5 (Note: While N64 Magazine's standard reviews rated games on a % system, their review of Getter Love!! declined to rate it, giving it a rating of "??%", pleading confusion. However, the "N64 Directory" of past reviews at the end of each issue included a secondary "star mark" rating out of five, intended to represent an updated score, and gave it 2/5 stars the following issue.)
Total Control	10%

Reception to Getter Love!! was mixed. Japanese publication Weekly Famitsu gave the game a score of 26 out of 40 points. Game Criticism felt that the competitive nature of the gameplay made it more accessible to a wide audience than traditional dating games. Reviewing imported copies, English publications N64 Magazine and Total Control found the game impossible to effectively play due to its extensive use of Japanese text.

A spinoff, Typing of the Date, (Note: タイピング OF THE デート, Taipingu OF THE Dēto) was released for Dreamcast on September 27, 2001. It removes the party game elements in favor of typing challenges and minigames using the Dreamcast keyboard. Makoto, Ayumi, and Shizuku all return as potential dates; the remaining girls, as well as other characters like Alfonso and Reika, appear in supporting roles. Two other typing-themed spinoffs, Gettyping Love!! (Note: ゲッタイピングラブ!!, Gettaipingrabu!!) and Gettyping Love!! 2, (Note: ゲッタイピングラブ!!2, Gettaipingrabu!!2) were respectively released on October 25, 2001, and February 12, 2002, for cell phones via the i-mode mobile service. Getter Love!! characters also make guest appearances in the 2001 Game Boy Advance game Hatena Satena.

An English fan translation patch for Getter Love!! was released in December 2023. The patch took four and a half years to develop, and was released to coincide with the game's 25th anniversary.
