= Water Warfare =

2009 video game

- Developer: Hudson Soft
- Publisher: Hudson Soft
- Platform: Wii (WiiWare)
- Release: JP: June 23, 2009; PAL: June 26, 2009; NA: June 29, 2009
- Genre: First-person shooter
- Modes: Single-player, multiplayer

Water Warfare, known in Japan as Bang Bang Kids (バンバン☆キッズ, Ban Ban☆Kizzu), is a first-person shooter video game by Hudson Soft for WiiWare. It is the second game in the genre to be released by Hudson Soft for WiiWare (after Onslaught).

Involving combat with water guns, Hudson has described the family friendly game as a "first-person soaker", which holds up Hudson's core design philosophy that prohibits explicit violence between people playing a game.

== Gameplay ==
Along with replacing firearms with water guns of several types (such as water firing machine guns, sniper rifles and rocket launchers), the game also replaces grenades with water balloons, armor with raincoats, and health bars with wet T-shirts, with health regenerated as the shirt dries in the sun or by the player picking up a towel. The water guns are refilled via drinking fountains situated around each level, with the game featuring 8 maps set amongst nature parks, beaches, playgrounds and a Venetian city.

The game features split-screen multiplayer for 2 players and online multiplayer for up to 8 players. Six multiplayer modes are featured including Battle Royale (survival), Deathmatch, Treasure Chest (capture the flag), a team-based Assault mode and Point Rally (race). The game also features a 38 mission long single player campaign, a spectator mode and bots to play against.

Like other Wii games in the genre, Water Warfare uses the pointer function of the Wii Remote to aim and the Nunchuk to move. The game also supports the Wii Zapper and Classic Controller. Unlike other Wii games, the maps change at random every game. For example, a slide that is on a hill in one game would be somewhere else in another.

== Reception ==
Reception

Aggregate score
Aggregator	Score
Metacritic	73/100

Review scores
Publication	Score
GamesRadar+	3/5
IGN	6.9/10
Nintendo Life	8/10
Official Nintendo Magazine	70%

The game received "mixed or average reviews" according to the review aggregation website Metacritic.
