= My Aquarium =

2008 video game

- Developer: Hudson Soft
- Platforms: Wii (WiiWare), PlayStation 3 (PSN)
- Release: WiiWare: JP: June 24, 2008; PAL: August 15, 2008; NA: September 1, 2008; PlayStation Network: JP: September 8, 2010; NA: September 14, 2010; PAL: September 15, 2010; My Aquarium 2: JP: August 3, 2010; NA: August 9, 2010; PAL: September 10, 2010
- Genre: Virtual pet simulation
- Mode: Single-player

My Aquarium, known in Japan as Blue Oasis: Sakana no Iyashi Kūkan (ブルーオアシス 〜魚の癒し空間〜, Burū Oashisu 〜Sakana no Iyashi Kūkan〜), is a virtual pet video game by Hudson Soft for WiiWare and PlayStation Network. It was released in Japan on June 24, 2008, in the PAL region on August 15, 2008 and in North America on September 1, 2008 for the WiiWare; and in September 2010 for the PlayStation Network.

== Overview ==
The game is a virtual aquarium that sees players caring for fish in up to six aquariums of their own design. The player can choose from 49 species of fish (most of which must be unlocked as only 13 are available at the beginning) to populate an aquarium that can be customized with a choice of decorations, backgrounds, lighting and plant life.

The game also would utilize data from the Forecast Channel, changing lighting and conditions based on the weather. However, there is no emphasis on realism; for example salt water and fresh water fish can be placed together and water temperature is not taken into consideration. While no cheats are available for the game itself, it has been noted that the game runs off of the various aspects of the Wii system and with that in mind, the date from the system settings can be changed repeatedly to unlock new or hidden items.

Players could also send their own aquariums to other players with the game through WiiConnect24.

== Reception ==
My Aquarium

Aggregate score
Aggregator	Score
Metacritic	(Wii) 46/100 (PS3) 42/100

Review scores
Publication	Score
Eurogamer	(Wii) 3/10
IGN	(Wii) 6/10
NGamer	(Wii) 40%
Nintendo Life	(Wii) 8/10
Official Nintendo Magazine	(Wii) 21%
PlayStation Official Magazine – UK	(PS3) 2/10

The game received "generally unfavorable reviews" on both platforms according to the review aggregation website Metacritic. IGN likened the Wii version to a screensaver and called time spent with it a "boot and watch" experience, ultimately leaving readers to decide if the game appeals to them.

== Sequel ==
A sequel entitled My Aquarium 2, known in Japan as Blue Oasis: Michinaru Shinkai (ブルーオアシス 〜未知なる深海〜, Burū Oashisu 〜Michinaru Shinkai〜), was released there on August 3, 2010, in North America on August 9, 2010 and in the PAL region on September 10, 2010 for the WiiWare.

=== Reception ===
My Aquarium 2

Aggregate score
Aggregator	Score
Metacritic	65/100

Review scores
Publication	Score
IGN	6/10
Nintendo Life	7/10

The sequel received "mixed" reviews, a bit more favorable than the original My Aquarium, according to Metacritic.
