= J-League Eleven Beat 1997 =

1997 video game

- Developer(s): Hudson Soft
- Publisher(s): Hudson Soft
- Platform(s): Nintendo 64
- Release: JP: October 24, 1997
- Genre(s): Sports
- Mode(s): Single player, multiplayer

J-League Eleven Beat 1997 (Jリーグ イレブンビート1997) is a soccer game for the Nintendo 64. It was released in Japan in 1997 and licensed by J-League. The players have a cartoon appearance as opposed to other Japanese soccer games at the time, such as J-League Dynamite Soccer 64.
