= Power Eleven =

1991 video game

- Cover art
- Developer: Westone
- Publisher: Hudson Soft
- Programmer: Michishito Ishizuka
- Composers: Shinchi Sakamoto; Hiromitsu Watanabe
- Series: Power Sports Series
- Platform: PC Engine
- Release: PC Engine: JP: June 21, 1991
- Genre: Traditional soccer simulation
- Modes: Single-player; Multiplayer

Power Eleven (パワーイレブン) is a 1991 Japan-exclusive football video game with top-down perspective, published by Hudson Soft for the PC Engine. It was part of the Power Sports Series, a series of sports games released between 1988 and 1998.

The game was also released for the Wii Virtual Console on February 26, 2008.

== Gameplay ==
=== Teams ===
There are 12 teams in total to choose from. These are:

- Argentina
- Brazil
- Colombia
- England
- France
- Netherlands
- Italy
- Japan
- Soviet Union
- Spain
- Uruguay
- West Germany

=== Modes ===
==== General ====
Power Eleven's top-down perspective.

There are no fouls or off-sides. In the case of a draw penalty kicks are shot which decide who the winner is. Before the beginning of the 2nd half of each game there is a short cheerleaders show. At the end of the show their leader gives a message to the player.

All players have a number of attributes. These are:

- Run (RUN)
- Dribble (DBL)
- Kick (KCK)
- Technique (TEQ)
- Power (POW)

Each player has a number for each one which can range from 1 to 10. The higher the number in one attribute the more skilled the player is in that particular area.

The Power attribute refers to the amount of "power" the player begins the game with. During the match this amount is shown in the lower left or right part of the screen for the currently controlled player. When used the player can move faster and strike harder but it also causes the remaining amount to decrease. It is slightly replenished at the beginning of the second half and fully replenished after each match. The total amount of "power" each player can have cannot be changed. Goalkeepers use it automatically when trying to save the ball. The CPU player only ever uses it when shooting.

==== Hudson cup ====
The player chooses one of the 12 teams and play against all the other teams in a series of matches. Winning a game will allow the player to play against the next team. After a loss, the player may either retry right away or at a later time by using a save or a password. Each game half lasts for approximately four minutes.

At the end of each winning game, if enough goals were scored, the player is given up to three new players to add to the team. This is the only time when the player has the option to replace the players in the team. There is a maximum number of such "bonus" players; if there are no more left, previous unused or replaced ones reappear. The player can only be given new substitutes starting from the second game. Regardless of the number of goals scored, the maximum number of substitutes for the second and third games is one and two, respectively. For the rest of the games the maximum number is three. There is normally one substitute for every three goals scored.

Cheerleading during the half-time.

After a victory the player is also given a password and the option to save the current game (if the PC-Engine being used has that ability). The save and password contain information regarding the current progress in the Hudson Cup as well as team players and their positions in the field. Only the last two bits of information are used when the save or password is used in the other modes (Vs etc.).

For the all modes apart from PK, the player can choose the formation of the team before each game (2FB (offensive), 433 (balanced), 532 (defensive)) as well as the position of the players in the field. Both are also possible after each goal (see controls).

After the player beats the final (11th) team there is a congratulations screen in which a hand of a player holding the World Cup is shown, followed by a medals ceremony with fireworks. No credits are shown but instead the player can continue with the current team (with all changes and subs) for another round of 11 matches. This new round is the same as the first one as far as the order of the teams is concerned, but the difficulty is set to "Level 3" for the whole duration so it is much more challenging. Its ending again includes the cup screen and medals ceremony but after that there is a short animation of a person finishing the game and deciding that it is time to turn off the TV and go to sleep, followed by a credits sequence. There is no third round.

==== Vs, Watch & PK modes ====
The Vs mode is a single match against either the CPU or another human player. Each side can be any of the default 12 teams or a saved team. The player can choose from three different levels of difficulty, with "Level 3" being the most difficult one. In Watch mode, the user cannot directly control the players, although the formation and the player positions may be changed. In both Vs and Watch modes, the user can choose the duration of each half which can last 15, 30 or 45 min. (two, four or six minutes in actual time). In PK mode, only penalty kicks are shot.

=== Controls ===
==== Formation screen ====
Pressing Select takes the player to the Substitutions screen.

==== While playing ====
Pressing the "I" button and the directional pad will make the player kick the ball. If the button is pressed quickly he will kick it at a short distance, if pressed for a longer time he will kick it as far away as he can. Pressing the same button without using the directional pad will make the player kick a long ball. The power button can also be used in this case even though the player is not moving. Receiving players can use long balls to perform a header or a scissor kick. Pressing the "II" button will use the power bar making the currently controlled player move faster and kick harder. No power is used up when the button is pressed but the player is not moving unless he kicks. Pausing the match and pressing "I" while playing once will show the map of the football field with all the player positions. Pressing it again will show the time and the current score. Doing the same after a goal and while the words "Kick Off" are shown on the screen will take the user to the formation screen where changes can be made.

== Credits ==
- Planner - Osamu Osanai, Polynesian Jiro
- Programmer - Michishito Ishizuka
- C. G. Engineer - Shinji Tagoh
- Guest - Cyber Akish, Seigo Aihara, Albert Matsuyama
- Music Composer - Shinchi Sakamoto, Hiromitsu Watanabe
- Adviser - Aroma Suma-P, Isao Komuro
- Supervisor - Boo Ueda
- Special Thanks - Hiroaki Katoh, Jun Tanita, Mitsuhiro Kadowaki, Eiji Aoyama, Mikio Ueyama, And You...

== Critical reception ==
The Japanese website Wazap! gave the game a total score of 68 out of 100. It scored specially high in the areas of its sound and longevity.

== See also ==
- Power Golf
- Power Sports
