= Bomberman Max =

- Developer: Hudson Soft
- Publishers: JP: Hudson Soft; NA: Vatical Entertainment
- Series: Bomberman
- Platform: Game Boy Color
- Release: JP: December 17, 1999; NA: May 9, 2000
- Genre: Action
- Modes: Single player, multiplayer

Bomberman Max: Blue Champion (Note: Bomberman Max (ボンバーマンＭＡＸ, Bonbāman Makkusu)) and Bomberman Max: Red Challenger are video games released for the Game Boy Color on May 9, 2000. The game was followed by Bomberman Max 2 which was released for the Game Boy Advance on June 4, 2002. There are two versions called Bomberman Max: Blue Champion and Bomberman Max: Red Challenger. In Blue Champion the playable character is Bomberman where in Red Challenger the playable character is Max.

A third version of the game, Bomberman Max: Ain Version, was a Japan-exclusive limited edition. Limited to 2,000 copies, it was only available through a lucky draw contest by the Pentel Ain ad campaign.

== Story ==
The story in both versions of the game is the same. An artificial intelligence named Brain has transformed five peaceful, happy planets into cold, dark, mechanical worlds. Both Bomberman and Max hear the distress cry of the Charaboms who live on these planets, and they begin a race to see who can save the Charaboms and defeat Brain first.

== Gameplay ==
Bomberman and Max must conquer 100 different stages, all of which have the classic overhead Bomberman view. Only 80 of them are playable by default, as the other 20 stages are version-exclusive. To unlock those version-exclusive stages the player must link the Game Boy Color with another one having the opposite version using the infrared sensors in the Pitch Area. While there are various tasks on each level, gameplay mainly consists of bombing, similar to the debut NES title. Some of the levels can only be unlocked by the Infrared Function on a Game Boy Color.

A new addition to the game is the introduction of the Charaboms. Each game has a unique set of Charaboms obtainable through single player mode.

== Release ==
Bomberman Max was developed by Hudson Soft and published by Vatical Entertainment. It was originally planned for either a spring or summer 2000 release in the United States.

== Reception ==
Bomberman Max: Blue Champion has an aggregated review score of 74.50% based on four reviews on Gamerankings. Christian Huey of Allgame suggested that the Charabom mode owes a lot to Pokémon, citing both the monster battling aspect as well as the fact that the game has two versions like Pokémon Red and Blue did. As far as traditional Bomberman gameplay goes, Huey felt that it was the pinnacle of the series at the time, and that while Bomberman fans will be satisfied, casual gamers may be turned off by the multiple versions. Brett Elston of GamesRadar called it the strangest addition to the Bomberman franchise until Bomberman: Act Zero released, criticizing the developer for "missing the point" of having multiple versions. Jeremy Parish praised it as a quality multiplayer experience for the Game Boy Color, hoping that it would see a re-release on a hypothetical Game Boy Color Mini. Craig Harris of IGN praised the game, citing the music, visuals, and gameplay for making it a quality experience. He also praised the infra-red functionality of the game. However, Harris felt disappointment that a traditional Bomberman multiplayer experience was absent. Justin Speer of GameSpot praised the gameplay, but similarly expressed disappointment that the game lacks a traditional multiplayer mode for the series, feeling that the multiplayer mode present does not make up for it. Pocket Gamer also criticized the lack of a traditional multiplayer mode, noting that it could have become "a classic" but instead felt that the mediocre multiplayer was "uninspired."
