= Virtual Soccer =

1994 video game

Virtual Soccer J.League Super Soccer
- Japanese box art
- Developer(s): Probe Entertainment
- Publisher(s): Hudson Soft
- Composer(s): Andy Brock
- Series: J.League Super Soccer
- Platform(s): Super NES
- Release: JP: March 18, 1994; EU: 1994
- Genre(s): Traditional soccer simulation
- Mode(s): Single-player, multiplayer

Virtual Soccer – known in Japan as J.League Super Soccer (Jリーグスーパーサッカー) – is a 1994 football video game published by Hudson Soft.

== Summary ==
The Japanese version featured all clubs from the top division of Japan Professional Football League J.League Division 1 (1994 J.League season), while the European version featured national teams. The player can choose two views, from a left-right perspective or with top-down perspective. There are many other options such as wind control, weather, environment, pitch type and player's velocity.

== Cancelled sequel ==
After the success of Mega Bomberman (1994), Hudson Soft announced their intention to develop more titles for Sega platforms. One of which was a sequel to Virtual Soccer. The title initially went by Virtual Soccer 2, before it was changed to Hudson Soft's Soccer. It was scheduled for release very late in the Sega CD's lifespan - March 1995 - but never materialized.

== See also ==
- J.League Super Soccer '95 Jikkyō Stadium
