= Bomberman Wars =

1998 video game

- Developers: Hudson Soft (PS1); Metro Corporation (Saturn)
- Publisher: Hudson Soft
- Series: Bomberman
- Platforms: PlayStation, Sega Saturn
- Release: JP: 16 April 1998
- Genres: RPG, strategy
- Modes: Single player, multiplayer

Bomberman Wars (ボンバーマンウォーズ, Bonbāman Wōzu) is a 1998 Japanese video game in the Bomberman series released for the Sega Saturn and PlayStation. It is a strategy role playing game, in contrast to previous games.

== Story ==
The main character is King Bomber who rules over his kingdom. The objective of the game is to conquer all the pieces of the Bomber country. Eventually, you fight the main villain, Bagular, and his four henchmen.

== Gameplay ==
It is a turned based strategy RPG.

It features a Quest mode, and a Battle mode.

== Release ==
It was released for the Sega Saturn and Sony PlayStation on April 16, 1998. It is the third Bomberman game for the Sega Saturn, and the second for the PlayStation. It was never released outside of Japan. In 2016, a fan translation was released for the PlayStation version.

== Reception ==
Reception

Review scores
Publication	Score
Famitsu	24/40
GameSpot	5.8/10

Weekly Famitsu reviewed the PlayStation version of the game, giving it a score of 24 out of 40. The UK Sega Saturn Magazine gave it a score of 81 out of 100. Gamespot gave it a 5.8 out of 10 score.
