= Hyakumonogatari: Honto ni Atta Kowai Hanashi =

1995 PC Engine release

- Publisher: Hudson Soft
- Platform: PC Engine CD-ROM²
- Release: JP: 4 August 1995
- Mode: Single player

Hyakumonogatari: Honto ni Atta Kowai Hanashi (Note: Japanese: 百物語 ~ほんとにあった怖い話~; lit.The Hundred Tales: True Scary Stories) is a compilation of ghost stories. It was published by published by Hudson Soft and made for the PC Engine's CD-ROM add-on hardware, the PC Engine CD-ROM² in Japan.

Hyakumonogatari features 70 ghost stories submitted to the Japanese magazine Honne ni Atta Kowai Hanashi. They are displayed with accompanying sound effects and visuals and shown as text on the screen. The rest feature a map showcasing haunted areas in the Kantō region of Japan, narrated stories from Junji Inagawa, and ten that feature interactive scary stories set in a fictional school.

It was released on August 4, 1995. In Famicom Tsūshin, the four reviewers complimented the visuals and sound effects while being split on whether the stories were scary or not.

== Content and gameplay ==
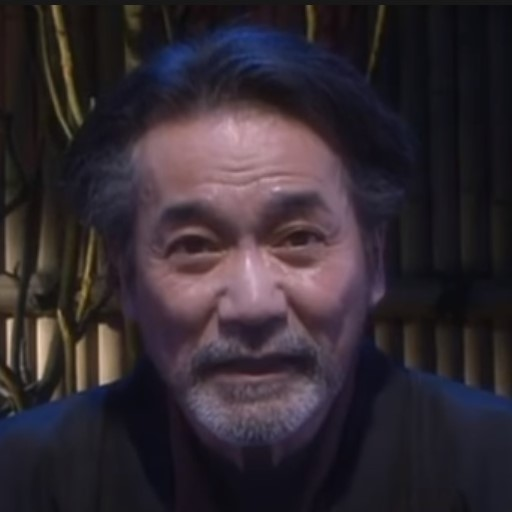
Ten stories in Hyakumonogatari are narrated by Junji Inagawa (pictured in 2018).

Hyakumonogatari: Honto ni Atta Kowai Hanashi features text and is mostly about reading and listening to scary stories, with there being 100 stories in total. Ten stories narrated by Junji Inagawa, who was known for telling scary stories on Japanese television.

Hyakumonogatari: Honto ni Atta Kowai Hanashi has the user select a lit candle on each screen representing a story. The type of story is unknown to its user. After each story, a candle goes out. An event occurs when all the candles go out. The stories are split into four categories: the first is the Main story, which covers 70 of the stories. The second is the "Seven Wonders of School" which are presented as fictional stories set in various classrooms, hallways, stairwells, washrooms in a school. In these stories, the user can select options to change the direction of the story. The third is parts of a map that contain information of paranormal-related details of 13 areas in the Kantō region of Japan. Locations include the Suzugamori execution grounds. The final ten are scary stories narrated by Junji Inagawa based on his own personal experiences.

== Development ==
Hyakumonogatari: Honto ni Atta Kowai Hanashi is a collection of ghost stories submitted by the readers of Honne ni Atta Kowai Hanashi, a magazine published by Asahi Sonorama. There are 100 stories included, 70 of which are from the submitted stories to the magazine.

When asked about his involvement, Junji Inagawa said while his son loved video games, he was not very good at them. He said that he admired that Hyakumonogatari could be enjoyed even by people standing by viewing someone else controlling it. By May 16, development on the project was 90% complete.

== Release and reception ==
Reception

Review score
| Publication | Score |
|---|---|
| Famitsu | 7/10, 7/10, 7/10, 5/10 |

Hyakumonogatari: Honto ni Atta Kowai Hanashi was released in Japan on August 4, 1995 for the PC Engine's CD-ROM add on device, the CD-ROM².

Two reviewers in Famicom Tsūshin found the stories appropriately scary, while the other two felt the opposite. The two reviewers who felt the stories were scary complimented on the use of sound effects and visuals to enhance the scariness of the stories. The reviewer who ranked the game the lowest score of five complimented the presentation but said that the lack of interactivity made it less interesting than similar scary stories watched on television.
