= Robopon =

1998 video games

- Japanese box art for (L to R) the Sun, Star, and Moon versions, depicting the Robopon Sunny, Digit, and Micro respectively
- Developer: Hudson Soft (Note: Developed in collaboration with Red Company))
- Publishers: JP: Hudson Soft; NA: Atlus
- Platform: Game Boy Color
- Release: Sun Version: JP: December 4, 1998; NA: December 11, 2000; Star Version: JP: December 4, 1998; Moon and Special Version: JP: December 24, 1999
- Genre: Role-playing
- Modes: Single-player, multiplayer

Robot Ponkottsu, (Note: Japanese: ロボットポンコッツ; lit. 'Junk Robot') commonly abbreviated as Robopon, (Note: Japanese: ロボポン) is a role-playing video game for the Game Boy Color. It focuses on a boy and his adventures on an island with his robotic Robopon friends, while collecting and battling other Robopon. Players could exchange data wirelessly over infrared using "GB Kiss" features built into the cartridge.

The game was initially split between two versions, Robot Ponkottsu Sun Version (Note: Japanese: ロボットポンコッツSUNバージョン) and Robot Ponkottsu Star Version, (Note: Japanese: ロボットポンコッツSTARバージョン) which were published by Hudson Soft in 1998. An expanded version with additional features, Robot Ponkottsu Moon Version, (Note: Japanese: ロボットポンコッツMOONバージョン) was released the following year, alongside the limited edition Robot Ponkottsu Comic BomBom Special Version, (Note: Japanese: ロボットポンコッツ ボンボンバージョン) which features art based on the concurrently-running Robopon manga. Only Robopon Sun Version was localized into English, being published by Atlus in North America in December 2000.

Critics gave the game mixed reviews, with multiple outlets noting its heavy resemblance to the Pokémon series of video games.

A spinoff, Robot Ponkottsu 64, was released for the Nintendo 64 in 1999, while a sequel, Robopon 2, was similarly split between two versions and released for Game Boy Advance in 2001.

== Gameplay ==
Screenshot of a battle in progress.

Gameplay revolves around collecting, software upgrading, equipment swapping, and battling robotic characters called Robopon in a similar manner to the Pokémon game series. Robopon can be found in the wild and captured using magnets. To power up the Robopon, the player can add software and parts to them. Parts have varying amounts of space to store software and determine what sort of attacks the Robopon can use. For example, a Robopon can have an "Armgun" or a "Punch" part, and its software can add one of 12 elemental attributes to the attacks, such as "Fire", "Thunder", "Holy", or "Sky". Furthermore, software can be added onto other parts, creating more powerful additions. For example, by equipping a "Thunder" software to a "Punch" part, the Robopon is able to use "Thunderpunch". Software can also be mixed together to create special attacks — by mixing "Fire" and "Thunder" software, the Robopon gains the special move "Zapp!!". This software can also be removed, which removes the attack abilities it grants as well.

The initial Sun and Star versions feature a combined 153 different Robopon to obtain, with some exclusive to each version, while the Moon version added 15 more. Because only Sun was released in the US, Robopon that were exclusive to the other versions are not accessible in English. Some Robopon must be upgraded, similar to Pokémon's evolution stages. The Robopon are classified as either Arm, Move, or Boot based on their stats. Arm Robopon tend to have strong offense, Move Robopon are fast, and Boot Robopon generally have high defense and health. Some parts can only be used by one of the three types, while boot Robopon can not have their parts or software changed.

Robopon cartridges have an Infrared panel on their top edge that allows them to trade information using waves much like a TV or VCR remote, allowing the cartridge to react to different objects. For example, pointing a remote control at the cartridges and pressing a button might boost the Robopon's stats, or open a chest within the games. This feature, called the "GB Kiss", was used in a handful of Game Boy games published by Hudson Soft, though Robopon was the only one to release in North America. Some GB Kiss features were not retained for the English release, including a messaging feature accessed from the main menu, which can also send messages over the telephone.

== Story ==
The player assumes the role of a child named Cody, whose grandpa is retiring and gives him the family business, a Robopon dispatching company. Cody travels around Porombo Island collecting Robopon and battling against the "Legend 7", the top-ranked Robopon collectors on the island. Each time Cody successfully beats one of the Legend 7, he takes his or her place in the ranking system.

== Release ==
Robopon Sun Version was the only version to receive an English release.

Initially, the Sun and Star versions were released in Japan on December 4, 1998. The Moon version followed a year later on December 24, 1999, which featured additional content not accessible in the previous releases. The Comic BomBom Special Version, a limited edition release based on Moon with some characters' sprites redrawn to resemble their appearance in the Robopon manga, was released the same day and distributed through Comic BomBom magazine. Only the Sun version was released in North America on December 11, 2000.

== Reception ==
Contemporary reviews

Review scores
Publication	Score
Electronic Gaming Monthly	7.5/10
Famitsu	8/10, 6/10, 7/10, 7/10
IGN	7/10
Nintendo Power	3/5, 2/5, 2/5, 2/5, 1/5

In Famitsu, all four reviewers said the game was similar to Pokémon, with one saying it was a rip-off of the game while others believed it was still enjoyable despite its derivativeness. One reviewer complimented the use of the infrared remote while another said it was not used enough within the game. Craig Harris of IGN said Sun was a decent game, but played like a clone of Pokémon. Nintendo Power's reviewers called Sun "an unabashed Pokémon knock-off", lamenting the game's unoriginality. Ethan Einhorn of Electronic Gaming Monthly called it "the best Pokémon clone yet", but wished it had innovated on the Pokémon gameplay formula more, believing the GB Kiss features were "superfluous".

== Legacy ==
A 3D Robopon game, Robot Ponkottsu 64: Nanatsu no Umi no Caramel, was released in Japan for the Nintendo 64 on the same day as Moon Version. Players could transfer select Robopon between the GBC games and the N64 game using the Transfer Pak.

A sequel was released in Japan in 2001 for the Game Boy Advance, which was split between two versions like the original game: Robopon 2 Cross Version and Robopon 2 Ring Version. It features several gameplay changes from the original game, including the addition of four-on-four Robopon battles. Both versions were released in North America in 2002.

Robopon received three manga adaptations; the first two, Robot Ponkottsu (ロボットポンコッツ) and Robot Ponkottsu 2 (ロボットポンコッツ2), are adaptations of the games of the same name, while the third, Robot Ponkottsu Go! (ロボットポンコッツ豪!), is an original continuation. All three series were illustrated by Hataru Tamori and serialized in Comic BomBom from 1998 to 2004. They are unusually risque for children's manga, as the majority of the female characters are depicted as having enormous breasts. Other merchandise, such as trading cards, was also produced.
