= Pit Crew Panic! =

2008 video game

- Developer: Hudson Soft
- Publisher: Hudson Soft
- Composers: Makoto Igarashi; Kazunori Takahara; Yuzo Takahashi; Chiemi Takano; Yuki Watanabe
- Platform: WiiWare
- Release: NA: December 1, 2008; JP: December 2, 2008; EU: December 5, 2008
- Genre: Puzzle
- Modes: Single-player, multiplayer

Pit Crew Panic! is a WiiWare game by Hudson Soft. It was released in North America on December 1, 2008, in Europe on December 5, 2008, and in Japan on December 2, 2008.

== Gameplay ==
Described by Hudson as an "action panic" game, Pit Crew Panic! sees players controlling a team of six pit crew girls in attempting to fix different objects. The game involves the player directing their pit crew with the pointer of the Wii Remote to fix broken parts on a variety of vehicles, such as racing cars and motorcycles, against a time limit. In addition, players must also fix more unusual objects termed "WHATSITs"; these include items such as toilets, cakes and a bed of flowers, right up to huge objects like castles, aircraft carriers, the Golden Gate Bridge and the International Space Station. In order to speed up repair players can jump in and help the girls out by picking a part and miming their repair action with the Remote.

The game gives players the option of playing in a normal time attack mode, an "abnormal mode" (a competitive mode involving two teams fixing the same WHATSIT) and a training mode. Each mode supports up to four players playing simultaneously. Players will also have the option to customize the rules, the WHATSITs that show up and the time limit they are set before starting the game. In addition, Pit Crew Panic! also features local and online multiplayer modes, and players will also be able to upload their best times onto an online leaderboard.

== Reception ==
WiiWare World gave Pit Crew Panic! a 6/10, finding the game playable but ultimately "rather repetitive" and suffering from some interface issues and visuals that are "all over the map". IGN gave the game 3.9/10, highlighting the game's unique concept but also noting shallow gameplay, limited lasting appeal and frustrating controls.
