= Rooms: The Main Building =

2008 video game

- Nintendo DS cover
- Developer: HandMade Game
- Publishers: Big Fish Games (Note: 2014 Steam release published by Zero Rock Entertainment.); Wii and DS: NA: Hudson Entertainment; JP: Hudson Soft; EU/AU: Nintendo
- Engine: Adobe Flash
- Platforms: Microsoft Windows, Mac OS X, Nintendo DS, Wii, iOS
- Release: August 11, 2008: Windows, Mac OS X; WW: August 11, 2008 Wii, Nintendo DS; NA: March 23, 2010; JP: April 29, 2010; EU: May 21, 2010 (DS); AU: June 17, 2010 (DS) iOS January 27, 2011
- Genre: Puzzle
- Mode: Single-player

Rooms: The Main Building is a puzzle game by South Korean studio HandMade Game, initially released in 2008 for Windows and Mac OS X. The game was released for the Nintendo DS and Wii by Hudson Entertainment in 2010, and for iOS in 2011.

== Gameplay ==
The player moves rooms of a building around to help the game's protagonist reach the exit.

== Development ==
The game was initially developed by independent game studio HandMade Game before being released by Big Fish Games in 2008. Hudson Entertainment, the North American publishing division of Japanese video game company Hudson Soft, released a version for the Wii and DS in 2010, while Nintendo released the DS version in Europe and Australia at the same time.

== Reception ==
Reception

Aggregate score
Aggregator	Score		
Aggregator	DS	PC	Wii
Metacritic	56/100	N/A	60/100

Review scores
Publication	Score		
Publication	DS	PC	Wii
Eurogamer	4/10	N/A	N/A
Famitsu	29/40	N/A	26/40
Game Informer	N/A	N/A	7/10
GameSpot	N/A	N/A	7/10
GameTrailers	N/A	N/A	5.5/10
Gamezebo	N/A	70/100	N/A
IGN	5/10	N/A	5/10
Nintendo Power	7/10	N/A	N/A
Official Nintendo Magazine	68%	N/A	68%
VideoGamer.com	6/10	N/A	N/A
Teletext GameCentral	4/10	N/A	N/A

The DS and Wii versions received "mixed" reviews according to the review aggregation website Metacritic. In Japan, where both versions were ported for release under the game Rooms: Fushigi na Ugoku Heya (Rooms（ルームズ） 不思議な動く部屋, Rūmuzu Fushigi na Ugoku Heya) on April 29, 2010, Famitsu gave it a score of three sevens and one eight for the DS version, and one six, one eight, and two sixes for the Wii version.
