= Galaxy Fräulein Yuna =

Media franchise

- LaserDisc cover of the first OVA

銀河お嬢様伝説ユナ (Ginga Ojōsama Densetsu Yuna)
- Created by: Mika Akitaka
- Original video animation
- Directed by: Yorifusa Yamaguchi
- Produced by: Haruo Sai; Masaki Sawanobori; Kōji Shimana
- Written by: Masashi Noro; Satoru Akahori
- Music by: Takanori Arisawa
- Studio: J.C.Staff
- Licensed by: NA: ADV Films
- Released: September 21, 1995 – November 22, 1995
- Runtime: 27–29 minutes
- Episodes: 2
- Original video animation

Galaxy Fräulein Yuna Returns
- Directed by: Akiyuki Shinbo
- Produced by: Haruo Sai; Masaki Sawanobori; Kōji Shimana
- Written by: Satoru Akahori
- Music by: Takanori Arisawa
- Studio: J.C.Staff
- Licensed by: NA: ADV Films
- Released: December 21, 1996 – May 21, 1997
- Runtime: 30–34 minutes
- Episodes: 3

Galaxy Fräulein Yuna (銀河お嬢様伝説ユナ, Ginga Ojōsama Densetsu Yuna) is a Japanese media franchise created by Mika Akitaka. The Japanese title literally translates to "Galaxy Lady Legend Yuna", "Fräulein" refers to the German word "Fräulein" standing for "Miss".

The main protagonist of the series is Yuna Kagurazaka, a somewhat ditzy 16-year-old girl. After winning a "Galactic Bishōjo Contest", she becomes "The Savior of Light", a magical girl charged with defending the universe from evil. After becoming "The Savior of Light", Yuna gains an impressively powerful armored suit. Her greatest strength, however, lies in her ability to befriend anyone, even her enemies. Her group of comrades (which is extensive) is comprised almost exclusively of former opponents.

== History ==
Galaxy Fräulein Yuna originated in 1992 when Red Company, in association with Hudson Soft, asked Mika Akitaka to create a video game for the PC Engine Super-CD console. Mika Akitaka was an established artist and mechanical designer, having worked on several Mobile Suit Gundam anime titles, including Zeta Gundam, War in the Pocket, and Stardust Memory. Hudson Soft released Galaxy Fräulein Yuna in Japan in 1992, with Mika Akitaka as character designer and writer.

The specific origins of Yuna lie in Mika Akitaka's MS Girls artwork, which were featured in many anime-related magazines during the late 1980s and early 1990s. With "MS" standing for "Mobile Suit", MS Girls was a collection of drawings of pretty girls dressed in Gundam-style powered armor. It is generally acknowledged that his work on Yuna was an evolution of the MS girls artwork. In fact, some of the original drawings in Mika Akitaka's book The World Wide Merchandise Division 2001 of Les MS Girls bear a striking resemblance to characters in the Yuna universe. At the 1998 Anime Expo in Anaheim, California, Mika Akitaka explained that Yuna began when his producer at Red Company asked him to design a shoot-em-up game featuring a character based on his Gundam F91 girl. The shooter ended up evolving instead into a visual novel, although Mika Akitaka would much later develop a title similar to the original Yuna design proposal titled Ginga Fukei Densetsu Sapphire.

The Yuna series became popular quite quickly. This led to the production of several sequels for various platforms, as well as art books, music, CD dramas, and two anime OVA series.

== Video games ==
There are a total of seven Yuna video games, and a few related software releases:

- Galaxy Fraulein Yuna for the PC Engine Super CD-ROM² in 1992. The first Yuna work to be released to the public.
- Galaxy Fräulein Yuna II: Eternal Princess for the PC Engine Super CD-ROM² in 1995.
- Galaxy Fräulein Yuna FX for the PC-FX in 1996.
- Galaxy Fräulein Yuna Remix for the Sega Saturn in 1996. An updated re-release of the original 1992 Yuna game, enhanced by improving the graphics and adding new animation cutscenes. This game was released in both a normal version and a collector's edition which included special oversized packaging and many omake items.
- Galaxy Fräulein Yuna 3: Lightning Angel for the Sega Saturn in 1997.
- Galaxy Fräulein Yuna 3: Final Edition for the PlayStation in 1998. A PlayStation port of Lightning Angel with slightly enhanced graphics and some bonus content.
- Galaxy Fräulein Collection for the PlayStation Portable in 2008. An unenhanced port of the first two Galaxy Fräulein Yuna games, along with Ginga Fukei Densetsu Sapphire, on a single disc. Other than the addition of an image gallery, no enhancements were made from the PC-Engine versions.

In addition, two Sega Saturn discs entitled Mika Akitaka Illust. Works, volumes 1 and 2, were released in 1996 and 1997 respectively. While these were software for a video game console, they are not true games, but rather collections of artwork, music, and digital omake material. Also released in 1997 were two computer software packages: Galaxy Fräulein Yuna Hybrid Collection and Galaxy Fräulein Yuna Visual Soundtrack. The former was a collection of PC-related omake such as desktop wallpaper, custom cursors, and screensavers. The latter contained a few music clips with slide-show style "videos".

All Yuna video games are mainly of the visual novel type. Combat scenes are played out in turn-based role-playing video game style. Yuna 3 incorporates a 3D Isometric view "tactical simulation combat system", transforming the combat into that of a tactical RPG. Yuna also makes a cameo appearance in Saturn Bomberman as a secret unlockable character.

== Anime releases ==
There are two Yuna anime series. The first, Galaxy Fräulein Yuna: Siren's Sadness, is a two-episode OVA. It was later translated and released in the west as simply Galaxy Fräulein Yuna. The plot of this anime overlaps with that of the Yuna FX video game; in fact, the opening sequence is completely identical, except for a difference in title card. This series is quite lighthearted and is primarily a comedy.

The second, Galaxy Fräulein Yuna: The Abyssal Fairy, is a three-episode OVA. It was released in the west as Galaxy Fräulein Yuna Returns or Galaxy Fräulein Yuna: Dawn of the Dark Sisters. This series does not duplicate any of the video game content directly, though chronologically it does takes place sometime after the first OVA but before Yuna 3. This series has a much darker tone than the earlier Yuna works, and while it does contain some comedy it is primarily an action/drama film.

== CD and music releases ==
Music for the series was written by Takanori Arisawa. There have been many Yuna-related audio CDs released, including anime and game soundtracks, image albums, and several drama CDs. As well, in 1997 the Japanese radio station Bunka Housou broadcast a live radio show entitled Galaxy Fräulein Radio. The radio show content was later released on three separate CDs.

== Characters ==
- Yuna Kagurazaka (神楽坂 優奈 Kagurazaka Yuna). Voiced by (Japanese) Chisa Yokoyama, (English) Cynthia Martinez. Yuna is the main protagonist of the series. At first, she was just another normal schoolgirl: a first-year student at Yokohama's Shiraokadai All-Girls' High School, enrolled in class 1-B, commuting from home to school each day via the local train route. Sometime prior to the first game, Yuna and several other girls entered the "Miss Ojousama Contest", an intergalactic beauty pageant, with Yuna herself being chosen as the winner. In doing so, she became an instant celebrity, and began a career as a popular idol singer. One night, the Matrix of Light Elner appeared to Yuna. She introduced herself as part of Yuna's personality (literally translated, "her other self"), and asked her to become the Savior of Light. Yuna then learned a great evil was about to invade the universe, and that Yuna herself had been charged with its protection. Thus began the first of Yuna's intergalactic adventures. Yuna is sometimes a bit clumsy and prone to making silly mistakes, and at first glance, one would think she is a natural airhead. However, she has a very energetic and positive personality that more than makes up for her shortcomings. She is not very skilled as an idol singer, nor is she quite diligent in her studies and exercise routine, and both her enemies and friends often wonder whether she has any potential talent that has yet to be unlocked. During battle or times of great personal danger, Yuna undergoes a transformation sequence and appears wearing her armored battle suit, the Light Suit. Her Light Suit has a very large array of weaponry to use in her battle against the forces of evil, ranging from a sword and rifle to an incredibly powerful beam cannon called the Matrix Divider (In "Galaxy Fräulein Yuna 2: Eternal Princess", it is upgraded to a more powerful version known as the Matrix Divider Plus). Yuna is also a big fan of the TV superheroine Ojousama Kamen Polylina (or Polylina the Masked Maiden), proudly boasting her status as "the #1 fan of the "Polylina-sama Fanclub". This fandom borders on complete obsession, with Yuna even going as far as referring to Polylina as her "one and only". Her heroine is in fact a TV character played by her best friend Lia, but for some reason, Yuna never manages to figure it out. In fact, Yuna's affection for Polylina is a major running joke in the series, with Lia often reacting in some (usually humorous) fashion to Yuna's fangirlish (and somewhat misguided) proclamations of shōjo-ai for her idol. Her friends call her by a variety of nicknames, including "Yuna" and "Yuna-rin". Yuna Kagurazaka currently lives with her parents, Naoko and Yuuichiro Kagurazaka, on Earth, in Japan's Yokohama Prefecture.
- Yuri Cube (ユーリィ・キューブ Yūrii Kyūbu). Voiced by (Japanese). Miki Takahashi, (English) Tamara Lo. Yuri is an android created by a highly advanced race. She was discovered in some ancient ruins on the moon during the storyline of "Galaxy Fräulein Yuna 2: Eternal Princess". Yuri came home with Yuna and lives at her house, and then becomes Yuna's best friend. At some point, she becomes the Kagurazaka family's adopted daughter, making her full name Yuri Cube Kagurazaka. Yuri is best known for her insatiable appetite. Yuri is immensely strong though performing feats of strength depletes her energy reserves, at which point she must eat to regain her strength. Her appetite is also her biggest weakness, as Yuna has been seen bribing Yuri with food on more than one occasion. In combat, Yuri not only uses her super strength, but she uses a weapon called Twin Dragon Fangs that can interchange to Sword mode or Gun mode. Also, she can create reinforced parts for upgrading El-Line to the more powerful El-Line Noi.
- Liavelt von Neuestein (リーアベルト・フォン・ノイエシュタイン Rīaberuto Fon Noieshutain). Voiced by (Japanese) Yumi Tōma, (English) Toni Navarre. Lia was the leader of The 13 Frauleins of Darkness, the 13 servants of the Queen of Darkness. She was defeated by Yuna in the first video game. Since her defeat, she has become one of Yuna's closest friends and a powerful ally. Her alter-ego is Lia the Phoenix. Lia is also Polylina the Masked Maiden, a mask wearing, crime-fighting superheroine with her own TV show. For some reason, Yuna never figures out that her friend Lia is also her beloved Polylina. Lia (and Polylina) has a robotic pet cat named Milky, who can transform into various weapons.
- Erika Kousaka ( Kousaka Erika). Voiced by (Japanese) Akiko Yajima, (English) Meredith Mae. Erika Kousaka appear in the second Galaxy Fräulein Yuna video game. She claims that she was supposed to take part in the Galaxy Beauty contest, but was sick at the time. If she wasn't, she would have won instead of Yuna. Since then, she became enemies with Yuna, getting back at her with all sorts revenge schemes. During Yuna's class taking a field trip to Earth's moon, Erika appear on the same trip and with her are an elite female students who follow Erika which she calls her group, The Erika Seven, who the members are Mami Hoshiyama, Rui Maria Marcie, Serika Koromo, Miki Shiratori, Midori Sasaki, and the Hinokawa twin sisters, Ako and Mako. During a fight of Yuna and Erika, the moon temple activate a signal that went to the Eternal Princess, which Erika and the Erika Seven got transported. Within the Eternal Princess, Erika and the Erika Seven became Galaxy Frauleins by Princess Mirage, they're mission is to stop Yuna from deactivated the beacon for the Eternal Princess to come. After Yuna defeated the Erika Seven, Yuna and Yuri fought Erika and won. Yuna shows compassion to Erika, that she has a change of heart. She helped Yuna defeat Princess Mirage as she became friends with Yuna as well. At the end of the video game, Erika now becomes close friends with Yuna as she fights Yuri for attention.
- Misaki Ichijouin (一条院 ミサキ Ichijōin Misaki). Voiced by (Japanese) Satomi Kōrogi, (English) Laura Chapman. Misaki's debut appearance is at the PC-FX game Galaxy Fräulein Yuna FX: Selene of Sadness and Galaxy Fräulein Yuna OVA: Siren's Sadness. As an intelligence officer of the Galaxy Alliance under the codename: Selene (or Saline in ADV Films' translation) she disguises as a mysterious transfer student in Shiraokadai HS All-Girls' High School to investigate claimed charges that Yuna is trying to take over the galaxy. Later, thanks to Fraulein D's plot, she wrongfully accused Yuna for terrorizing the city and arrested her. Before Yuna's execution, she listened to positive testimonials of Yuna's friends, which caused her to realize that Yuna is truly innocent. In the nick of time, she prevented the execution, foiled Fraulein D's plan and entered into Yuna's circle of friends. Unlike others who receive their armored suits from outside sources Misaki's armored suit is standard issue to the Galaxy Alliance. She specializes in long-range combat with her Linear Railgun, has access to secret files of the Galaxy Alliance for intelligence gathering and has the ability to teleport, one of the only characters other than Lia that can perform such a feat.
- Ayako (亜耶乎 Ayako). Voiced by (Japanese) Kyoko Hikami, (English) Kira Vincent Davis. Ayako is the youngest of the three Dark Sisters, who are powerful androids that cause destruction. They came to Earth to make a place for them to live by wiping out humanity, but they first need to destroy Yuna and the other Galaxy Frauleins. When Ayako got injured, Yuna help her and befriended her, she then show Ayako how humanity is not so bad. Ayako then had a change of heart as she helped Yuna and her friends stop her second big sister Kyako from using a weapon. She then gets killed by her first big sister Genmu for choosing Yuna and her friends over her sisters. Yuna then killed Genmu and recover an orb that belonged to Ayako, which Yuna kept it as a memento. Ayako and her big sisters were then brought back to life by the Machine Empress in the Galaxy Fräulein Yuna 3 video game. Ayako was soulless without her orb as she attacks Yuna and the Galaxy Frauleins. Yuna was able to get Ayako back to herself as her orb return to her body, with this Ayako joins Yuna and the Galaxy Frauleins to stop the Machine Empire. Yuna and Polylina had a final showdown with Genmu and Kyako that they defeated and injured them. Yuna then wanted to help them because their Ayako's big sisters, and when Genmu accepted help, a fail safe in Genmu and Kyako actives inside of them which their bodies exploded, leaving Ayako with no sisters. After defeating the Machine Empress, Ayako returns to Earth with Yuna and the others, as Yuna and Yuri become Ayako's new big sisters. Ayako's appearance is similar to Sasami Jurai from the Tenchi Muyo! franchise.
- Pai-Sang (白香 Paishan). Voiced by (Japanese) Omi Minami. Pai-Sang appears only in Galaxy Fräulein Yuna 3 video game. She is the same kind of android that Ayako and her sisters are. Yuna and the Galaxy Frauleins met her when she was held prisoner and after helping her, she joins Yuna and her friends to stop the Machine Empress. She guided them about saving the three Wise Machines, Jinmin, Chuuphon, and Yui-Pha the White Empress. She is a kind person and has a mechanical snail on her back to use in combat.
- Princess Mirage (プリンセス・ミラージュ Purinsesu Mirāju). Voiced by (Japanese) Yūko Mizutani, (English) Susan Magnuson and Christine Auten. Her real name is "Culture Computer No.3". She first appears in Galaxy Fräulein Yuna 2: Eternal Princess as a captain of an extremely powerful battleship, the titular "Eternal Princess". Scattered throughout the galaxy, hidden beacons are placed throughout every planet left eons ago, which monitors the level of conflict in the area. Whenever there is a strong level of conflict, such as interplanetary warfare, the beacon signals the Eternal Princess to go and stop the wars from reaching galactic scale by destroying the planets that are involved with its main cannon. When Yuna and Erika engaged into a cat-fight, they happen to be close to the beacon which signals the Eternal Princess to come and destroy Earth. Luckily, with the help of Yuri, Yuna managed to stop Earth's destruction and gained Princess Mirage's friendship. Now Princess Mirage orbits around Earth watching over Yuna, and giving the often-oversleeping Yuna her daily "morning alarm" (which usually provokes a humorous reaction from the rudely awakened Yuna). Princess Mirage is designed by Kōsuke Fujishima, hence the strong resemblance to Belldandy from Oh! My Goddess.

=== Matrix of Light ===
They are Yuna's first allies, as her main task in the first game was to find Erina, Jina and Marina. Together they can combine into a giant robot called El-Line to fight against the never ending Battle of Light vs Dark.

- Elner (エルナー Erunā). Voiced by (Japanese) Yuriko Yamamoto, (English) Carol Matthews. Known as "Elner of Wisdom" and sporting a fairy-like appearance, she is the one who brought Yuna into her responsibility as the Savior of Light. In the first game, she guides Yuna in searching for the Matrix of Light: Erina, Jina and Marina to assist her fight against the Queen of Darkness. Elner possesses powerful sensory equipment for information gathering even detecting evil energy, and is shown in the first OVA to have telepathic powers. She also creates Yuna's Light Suit, since Yuna cannot transform herself, and usually she is a constant adviser to Yuna always reminding her to get her act together as the Savior of Light.
- Erina (エリナ). Voiced by (Japanese) Junko Hagimori, (English) Junie Hoang. Known as "Erina of the Sky", she has the ability to fly. Erina has a snobbish personality, and can combine with Yuna's Light Suit to form an aerial flight armor that allows Yuna to reach in high places. She was sealed in a black hole before Yuna found her.
- Jina (ジーナ Jīna). Voiced by (Japanese) Naoko Nakamura, (English) Katrine Pine. Known as "Jina of the Land", she has a quiet and somewhat lazy personality. When combined with Yuna's Light Suit, it granted her the ability to move the ground at high speed and provides heavy firepower. She is the first Matrix of Light Yuna found in a deserted planet.
- Marina (マリナ). Voiced by (Japanese) Suzuki Saori, (English) Cher MacDonald. Known as "Marina of the Sea", she has a bubbly yet sensitive personality. Combining with Yuna's Light Suit enables Yuna, who surprisingly cannot swim, to travel underwater and fight aquatic enemies. Yuna found Marina in a dense mangrove forest on a swamp planet.
- El-Line (エル・ライン Eru Rain). A 21 Meter Matrix Figure (Giant Robot) upon fusion of Elner, Erina, Jina and Marina. Long ago, it was defeated during the battle against the Queen of Darkness and its parts were scattered and sealed. As Yuna is the Savior of Light, an important element of forming El-Line, found Erina, Jina and Marina thus unlocking its ancient power and defeat the Queen of Darkness. With Yuri, she can create reinforced parts to form the more powerful El-Line Noi.

== Episodes ==
=== Galaxy Fräulein Yuna ===
The first OVA series was directed by Yorifusa Yamaguchi under the supervision of Takeshi Mori. Satoru Akahori and Masashi Noro wrote the scripts together, Akiyuki Shinbo storyboarded the episodes, and Noriyuki Nakamura is the episode director. Katsumi Shimazaki designed the charactersr, and Ryouichi Ooki is the animation director.

No.	Title	Original release date
1	"Sorrowful Saline - Act One"; Transliteration: "Kanashimi no Saline: Zenpen" (Japanese: 哀しみのセイレーン 前編)	September 21, 1995
2	"Sorrowful Saline - Act Two"; Transliteration: "Kanashimi no Saline: Kouhen" (Japanese: 哀しみのセイレーン 後編)	November 22, 1995

=== Galaxy Fräulein Yuna Returns ===
The second OVA series was directed by Akiyuki Shinbo with Takafumi Hoshikawa acting as episode director for all episodes. Shimazaki returned to design the characters, as well as act as chief animation director. Satoru Akahori returned, but did not write any of the scripts himself, instead acting as the story editor.

No.	Title	Written by (Note: Information is taken from the ending credits of each episode.)	Storyboarded by	Animation director	Original release date
1	"Fairy of the Deep Darkness Vol.1"; Transliteration: "Shin'nen no Fearī Vol. 1" (Japanese: 深淵のフェアリィ Vol. 1)	Sumio Uetake	Noriyuki Abe	Masahiro Andou	December 21, 1996
2	"Fairy of the Deep Darkness Vol.2"; Transliteration: "Shin'nen no Fearī Vol. 2" (Japanese: 深淵のフェアリィ Vol. 2)	Masashi Kubota	N/A (Note: No storyboard artist credited.)	Yoshiki Yamakawa (characters) (Note: Credited as Yoshinobu Yamakawa (山川良志信).); Sumeragi Jirou (mecha) (Note: A pseudonym written as Sumeragi Jirou (皇ジロー).)	January 22, 1997
3	"Fairy of the Deep Darkness Vol.3"; Transliteration: "Shin'nen no Fearī Vol. 3" (Japanese: 深淵のフェアリィ Vol. 3)	Sumio Uetake	Noriyuki Abe	Masakatsu Sasaki	May 21, 1997
