= Dynablaster =

Dynablaster or Dyna Blaster is a name that has been given to the European releases of four different games of the Bomberman franchise and one clone title:

- Atomic Punk (Game Boy)
- Bomberman (TurboGrafx-16, MS-DOS, Amiga and Atari ST)
- Bomber Man World (Arcade)
- Bomberman II (NES)
- Dynablaster (2023 clone of Bomberman)
