= Power League 64 =

1997 video game

- Developer: Hudson Soft
- Publisher: Hudson Soft
- Platform: Nintendo 64
- Release: JP: August 8, 1997
- Genre: Sports
- Modes: Single player, multiplayer

Reception

Review score
Publication	Score
N64 Magazine	42%

Power League 64 (パワーリーグ64) is a baseball game for the Nintendo 64. It was released in Japan in 1997. The game features licensed teams from Nippon Professional Baseball League
