= Robot Ponkottsu 64: Nanatsu no Umi no Caramel =

1999 video game

- Developer: Red Company
- Publisher: Hudson Soft
- Platform: Nintendo 64
- Release: JP: December 24, 1999
- Genre: Role-playing
- Modes: Single-player, multiplayer

Robot Ponkottsu 64: Nanatsu no Umi no Caramel (ロボットポンコッツ６４ ～七つの海のカラメル～, Robot Ponkottsu 64: Caramel of the Seven Seas) is a turn-based role-playing video game for the Nintendo 64. It was released in Japan on December 24, 1999, having been demonstrated at Space World on August 27–29 of the same year. It is part of the Robopon series, and can use the Transfer Pak to connect to the Game Boy Color Robopon games to exchange and battle specific Robopon. Connecting other unrelated Game Boy Games will create special food items that can be given to a Robopon to increase its stats. A total of 45 different Robopon appear in the game, including the 15 Robopon introduced in Robot Ponkottsu Moon Version.
