= Power Golf =

1989 video game

- Developer: Hudson Soft
- Publishers: Hudson Soft; Konami (Windows)
- Composer: Daisuke Inoue
- Series: Power Sports Series
- Platforms: TurboGrafx-16; Windows
- Release: JP: May 25, 1989; NA: August 29, 1989; Windows Store: JP: May 1, 2014
- Genre: Sports
- Modes: Single-player, multiplayer

Power Golf is a golf video game developed and published by Hudson Soft for the TurboGrafx-16 on August 29, 1989 as one of the system's launch titles. It was part of the Power Sports Series, a series of sports games released between 1988 and 1998.

== Gameplay ==
Played using primarily an overhead view of each hole, Power Golf features stroke and match play, and a competition mode that supports up to three players.

== Release ==
The game was released for the Wii Virtual Console on October 9, 2007 in Japan, on November 5, 2007, in North America, and on November 9, 2007 in Europe, and was released for the Windows Store on May 1, 2014 and for the Wii U Virtual Console on October 22, 2014 in Japan.

== Reception ==
Reception

Review scores
Publication	Score
Aktueller Software Markt	8/12
Computer and Video Games	88%
Eurogamer	3/10
Famitsu	6/10, 6/10, 7/10, 5/10
GameSpot	6/10
IGN	3/10
Marukatsu PC Engine	7/10, 6/10, 7/10, 6/10
Nintendo Life	4/10

Power Golf garnered mixed reviews from critics.

== See also ==
- Power Eleven
- Power Sports
