= J.League Super Soccer '95 Jikkyō Stadium =

1995 video game

- Developer: Hudson Soft
- Publisher: Hudson Soft
- Composers: Masaaki Nishizawa; Eisaku Nanbu; Kennosuke Suemura
- Series: J.League Super Soccer
- Platform: Super Famicom
- Release: JP: March 17, 1995
- Genre: Traditional soccer simulator
- Modes: Single-player; Multiplayer

J.League Super Soccer '95: Jikkyō Stadium (J.League Super Soccer '95 実況 スタジアム) is a 1995 football video game that was released by Hudson Soft exclusively in Japan. It is a sequel to J.League Super Soccer.

== Summary ==
=== Gameplay ===
J.League Super Soccer '95: Jikkyō Stadium featured all clubs from the top division of Japan Professional Football League J.League Division 1 (1995 J.League season). The players can choose from two distinctive views for gameplay. These views include a left-right perspective and a top-down perspective.

=== Audio ===
The main feature was the inclusion of chants from each team.

== Reception ==
On release, Famicom Tsūshin scored the game a 28 out of 40.

== See also ==
- SNES Multitap
