= Bomberman Max 2 =

2002 video game

- Developer: Hudson Soft
- Publishers: JP: Hudson Soft; NA: Majesco; PAL: Vivendi Universal Games
- Series: Bomberman
- Platform: Game Boy Advance
- Release: JP: 7 February 2002; NA: 4 June 2002; EU: 14 March 2003
- Genre: Action
- Modes: Single player, multiplayer

Bomberman Max 2: Blue Advance and Bomberman Max 2: Red Advance are video games released for the Game Boy Advance on 4 June 2002 in North America. The game was preceded by Bomberman Max which was released for the Game Boy Color in May 2000. As with Bomberman Max, there are two versions of Bomberman Max 2: Blue Advance and Red Advance. As in the first, in Blue Advance the playable character is Bomberman and in Red Advance the playable character is Max.

== Story ==
Bomberman and Max have been shrunk by the evil Mujoe's Mini-Mini Device. They must take revenge on him and his Hige Hige Bandits, and hopefully return to their normal size.

== Gameplay ==
The gameplay is similar to most Bomberman games, where Bomberman and Max lay down bombs to destroy enemies, blocks, etc. Unlike past Bomberman games, however, there is a lack of the classic multiplayer, instead featuring a more Pokémon-like game. In this game, there are many monsters that Bomberman and Max can acquire and use to their advantage.

Both games are more or less the same, although they both have some extra levels and different Charaboms.

== Reception ==
Reception

Aggregate scores
Aggregator	Score
GameRankings	71% (Blue); 73% (Red)
Metacritic	75/100 (Blue); 75/100 (Red)
