= Hatena Satena =

2001 video game

- Developer: Hudson Soft
- Publisher: Hudson Soft
- Platform: Game Boy Advance
- Release: JP: October 4, 2001
- Genre: Puzzle
- Mode: Single-player

Hatena Satena (ハテナサテナ) is a Game Boy Advance puzzle video game by Japanese developer Hudson Soft with design elements by Framegraphics of Japan in courtesy of Super Lovers. The gameplay can be described as a mix of nonogram puzzles and Minesweeper, whereas the design is similar to that of Super Milk Chan.
