= Onslaught (2009 video game) =

- Developer: Shade
- Publisher: Hudson Soft
- Platform: WiiWare
- Release: PAL: February 13, 2009; NA: February 23, 2009; JP: March 3, 2009
- Genre: First-person shooter
- Modes: Single-player, multiplayer

Onslaught, known in Japan as MadSecta (マッドセクタ, MaddoSekuta), is a first-person shooter for WiiWare by Hudson Soft. It was released in the PAL regions on February 13, 2009, in North America on February 23, 2009, and in Japan on March 3, 2009.

== Gameplay ==
Onslaught sees the player as a member of a military team sent to a research colony on a distant planet after contact is lost. Upon arrival the team is attacked by swarms of cyborg insects, which the player must destroy and ultimately uncover what happened to the colony. The game features 13 levels grouped into tiers, with the player needing to pass all stages in a tier and defeat a boss in order to progress to the next one.

Like other Wii games in the genre, Onslaught uses the pointer function of the Wii Remote to aim and the Nunchuk to move. Motion controls are also utilized with a throwing motion of the Nunchuk used to toss grenades and waggling of the Remote to reload. Motion controls are also used to wield a laser whip, and to wipe off insect blood which can blind and damage the player. Players can also issue simple orders to two squad mates who provide additional support, while some levels give the player the chance to pilot a heavily armed vehicle.

The game also features online score-based competitive and co-operative multiplayer for up to 4 players through the Nintendo Wi-Fi Connection.

== Plot ==
At an unspecified point in the future, the Space Development Bureau sends research vessels loaded with EICs, Or Enhanced Insect Cyborgs, to various unexplored planets in hopes of the EICs terraforming them, and thus making them suitable for colonization. However, contact with several of the vessels is lost, ultimately leaving the fate of their crews and EICs unknown.

Several years later, the Bureau receives a distress signal from one of the missing ships, originating from the planet HS-0204. In response, the Bureau dispatches several response teams to investigate the planet.

== Development ==
Despite featuring a score-based competitive multiplayer mode, the exclusion of a deathmatch mode from the game is the consequence of Hudson's core design philosophy which prohibits explicit violence between people playing a game. Another design decision was the focus on attaining high scores and rankings compared to simply completing objectives as with other games in the genre.

== Reception ==
Reception

Aggregate score
Aggregator	Score
Metacritic	66/100

Review scores
Publication	Score
Destructoid	6/10
Gamekult	6/10
GamesRadar+	3/5
IGN	6/10
Jeuxvideo.com	13/20
NGamer	40%
Nintendo Life	9/10
Official Nintendo Magazine	78%
Teletext GameCentral	6/10

The game received "average" reviews according to the review aggregation website Metacritic.

Nintendo Life praised the online multiplayer and the replay value of the single player campaign. Official Nintendo Magazine also praised the multiplayer but believed the story mode to be "extremely dull with a plodding pace".

GamesRadar+ praised the solid controls but also noted the game's dull presentation and generic narrative. IGN ultimately summed it up as "a huge mess of different quality standards", citing poor localization and slow and repetitive gameplay, but thought the game was still somewhat fun "in an odd, disjointed, Earth Defense Force kind of way".
