= Sharp MZ =

Early line of personal computers

The Sharp MZ is a series of personal computers sold in Japan and Europe (particularly Germany and Great Britain) by Sharp beginning in 1978.

== History ==
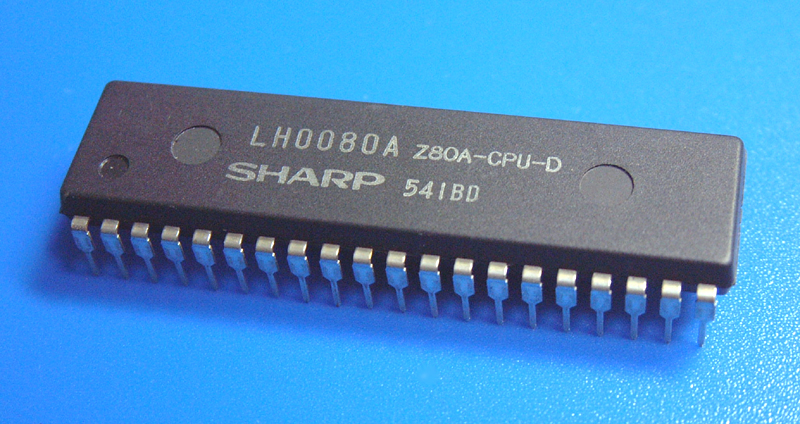
CPU Sharp LH0080A (Z80A compatible)

Although commonly believed to stand for "Microcomputer Z80", the term MZ actually has its roots in the MZ-40K, a home computer kit produced by Sharp in 1978 which was based on Fujitsu's 4-bit MB8843 processor and provided a simple hexadecimal keypad for input. This was soon followed by the MZ-80K, K2, C, and K2E, all of which were based on 8-bit LH0080A Sharp CPU (compatible to Zilog Z80A) with an alphanumeric keyboard.

From the first Z80 processor-based model to the MZ-2200 in 1983, the MZ computers included the PC, monitor, keyboard, and tape-based recorder in a single unit, similar to Commodore's PET series. It was also notable for not including a programming language or operating system in ROM. This invited a host of third-party companies, starting with Hudson Soft, to produce many languages and OSes for the system. In an era when floppy disk drives were too expensive for most home users, the MZ's built-in cassette tape drive was faster and more reliable than the cassette storage on some competing computers; however, this meant that the MZ series was relatively slow to adopt floppy drives as a standard accessory.

In 1983, after the most popular home computers appeared in the UK, the Sharp MZ-700 was briefly the 10th best selling machine out of 20 considered, beating the Apple IIe, Atari 800 and TI-99/4A.

In May 2012, Sharp's Japanese Twitter account announced that they had found a copy of an MZ manual in a warehouse, and were hoping to digitize it in the future. On 21 December 2012, Sharp's Japanese Twitter account announced that they had published digital copies of manuals for the MZ-80 on their official website. It was promoted as a "Christmas present" to fans.

== Products ==
The MZ series is divided into several lines, including the text-based MZ-80K series, the graphics-based MZ-80B series, and the MZ-3500/5500 series, based on a completely different architecture.

In 1982, Sharp's television division released the X1, a completely new computer. The X series proved to outsell Sharp's own MZ series, and in response, Sharp released the MZ-1500/2500 machines, which featured powered-up graphics and sound capabilities. However, this series saw little marketplace success, and eventually the company abandoned the line in favor of the X68000 series.

=== MZ-80K group ===
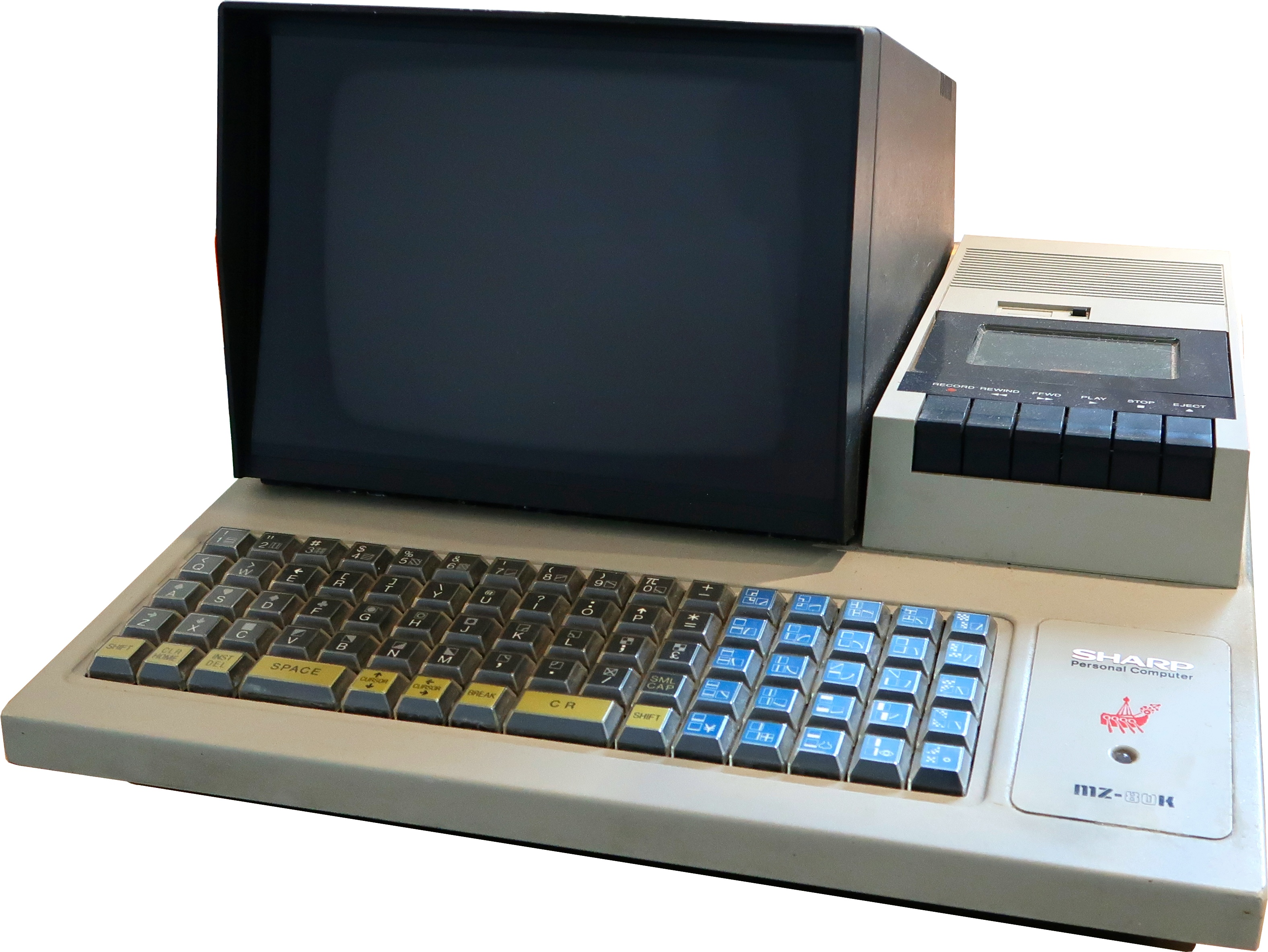
Sharp MZ-80K

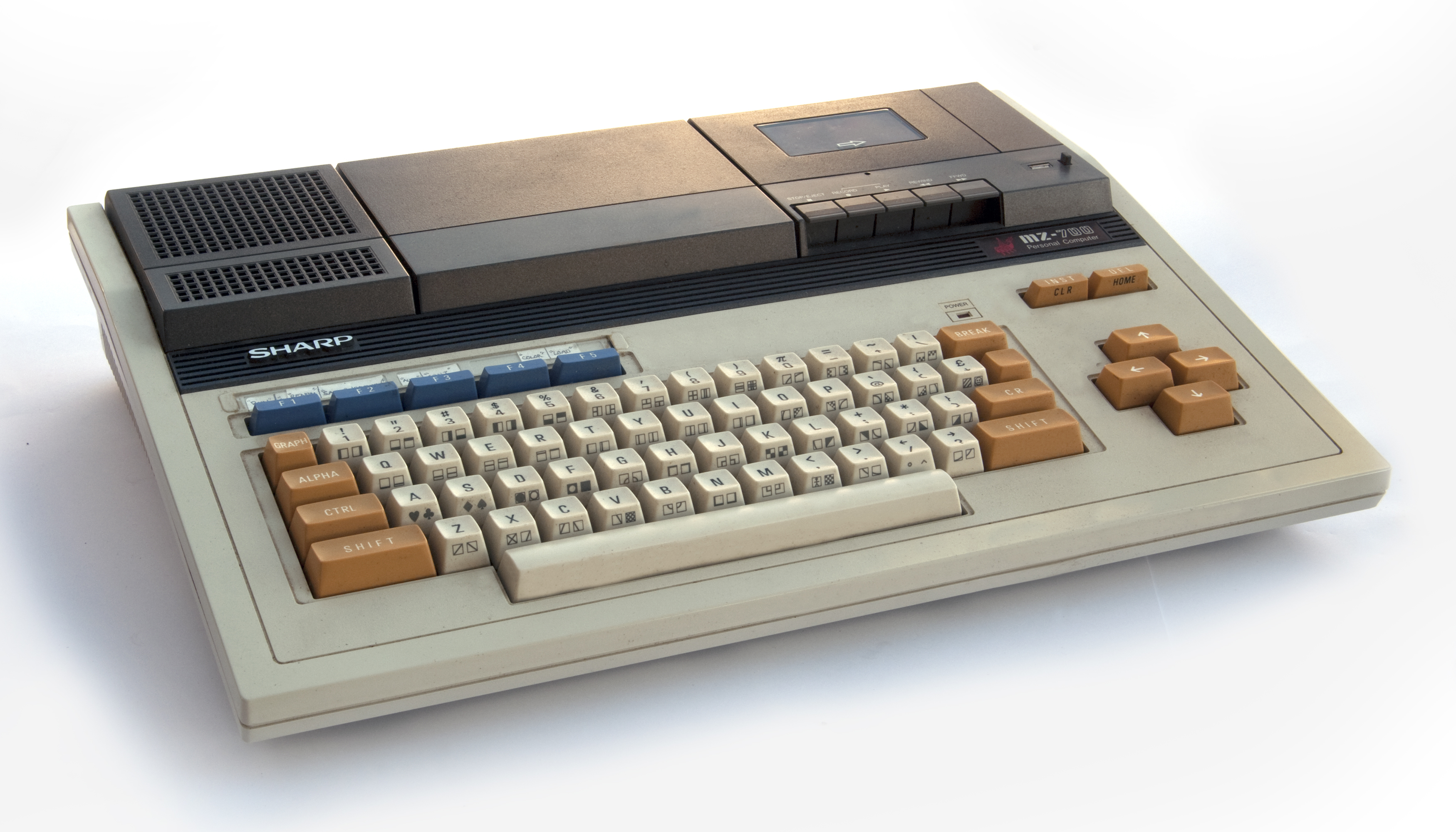
Sharp MZ-700 (MZ-721)

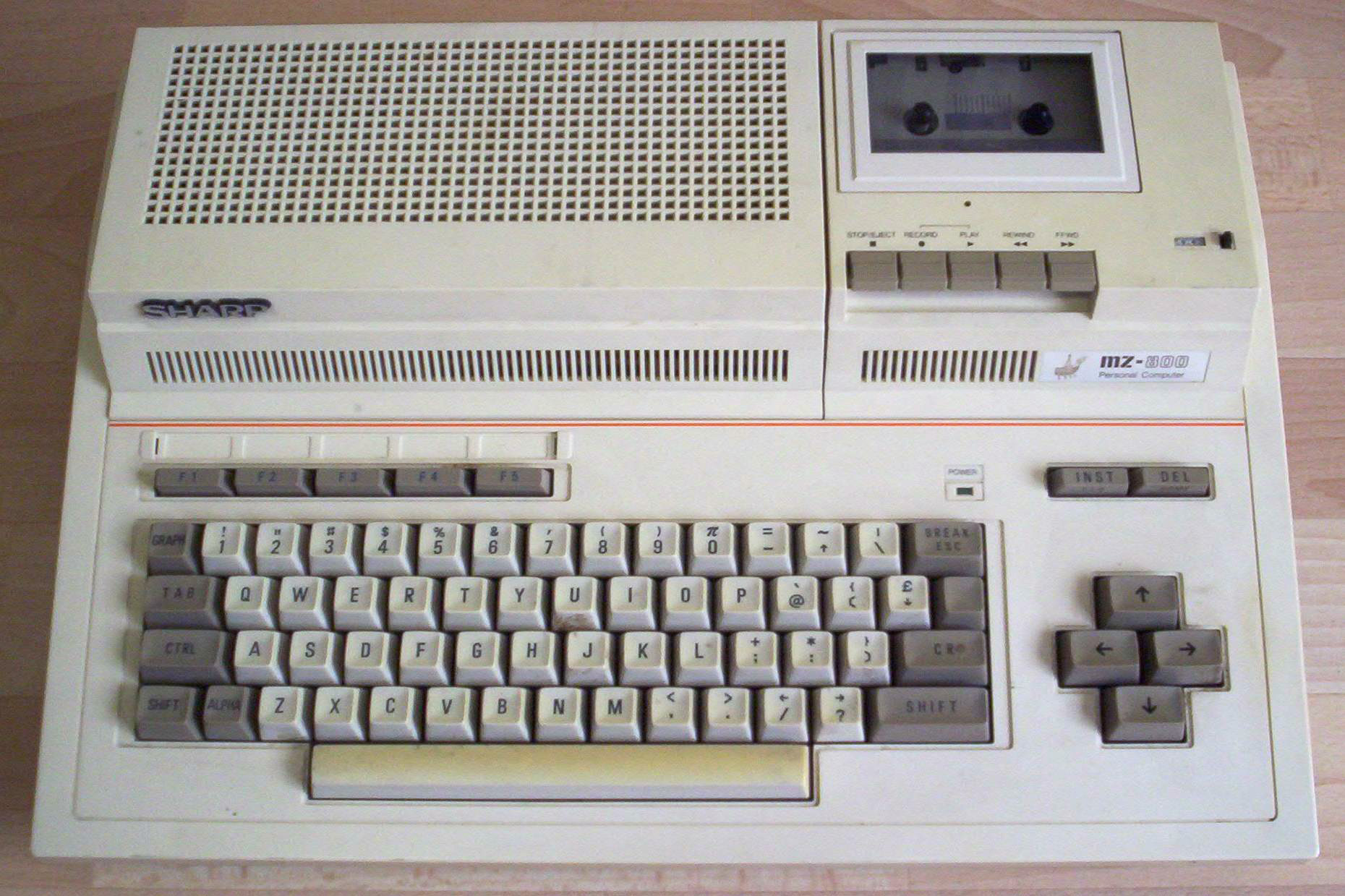
Sharp MZ-800 (MZ821)

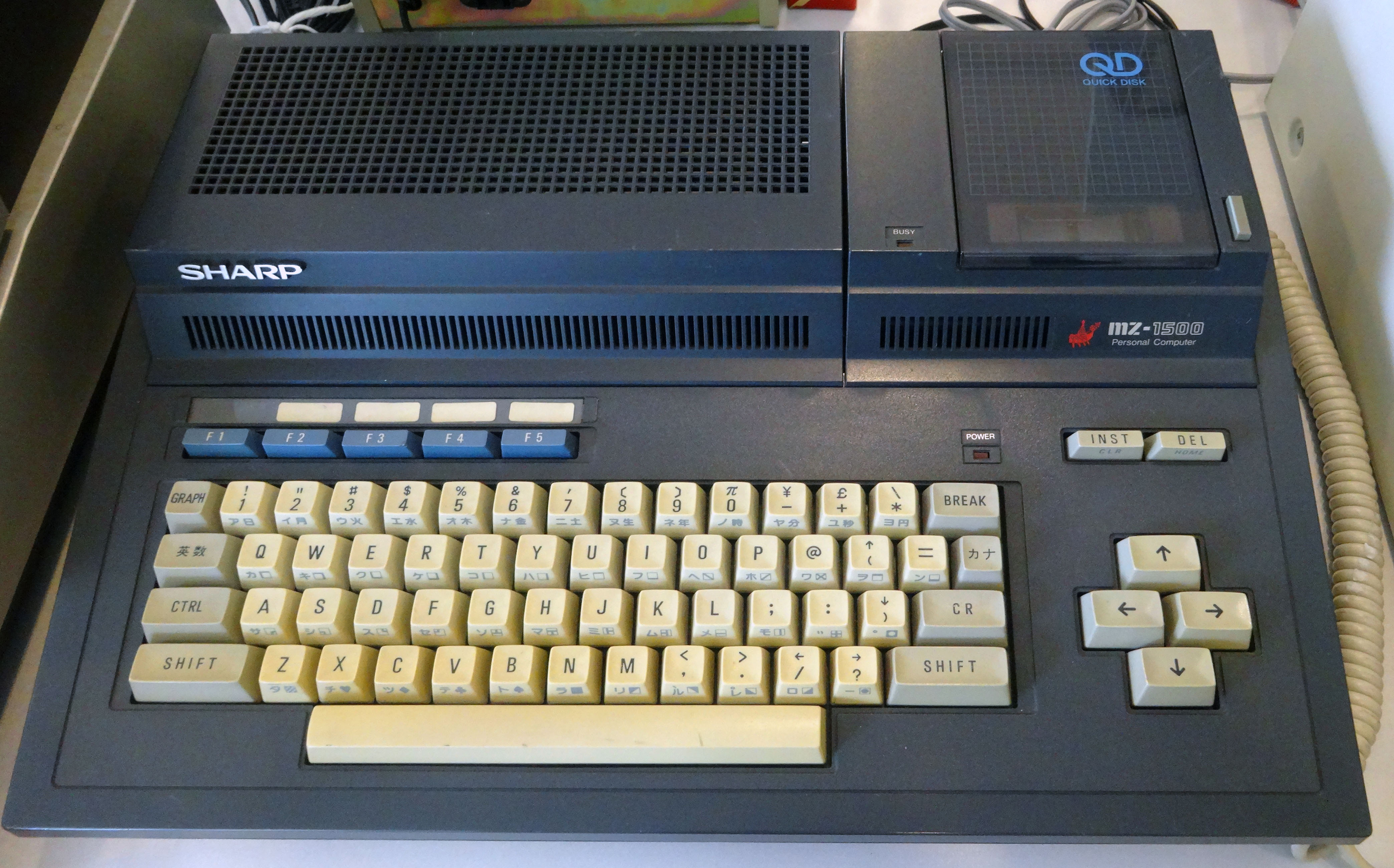
Sharp MZ-1500

The Sharp MZ-80K was one of the popular early consumer-level microcomputers, with an architecture based on the Zilog Z80 8-bit microprocessor. It was introduced into Europe in 1979. The machine had 48KB of RAM, 32KB of which was available for user programs (the actual figure was dependent on the memory configuration and the system languages being used). It could run a variety of high-level languages including BASIC, Pascal and FORTRAN, which had to be loaded into RAM before any programming could be undertaken. It could also be programmed directly in assembly code or machine code. The machine had an inbuilt monochrome display and a cassette tape drive. The display, keyboard and cassette drive lifted on hinges to expose the motherboard and circuitry underneath. Graphics capability was primitive, with only preset shapes and icons being available and no native hi-res capability. This was not unusual for a late-1970s vintage microcomputer. The main drawback, however, of the MZ-80K was the non-standard keyboard, which was difficult to use.

The MZ-80K sold well in Europe despite its high price (it retailed at over £500 in 1980), and a large range of software was available, including some Japanese arcade games. It was superseded in 1982 by the MZ-80A machine.

- MZ-80K series
  - MZ-80K (1978): An all-in-one kit with keyboard.
  - MZ-80C: Featured an improved keyboard and 48KB of memory.
  - MZ-80K2: The assembled version of the 80K.
  - MZ-80K2E: A low-price version of the 80K2.
  - MZ-80A (1982)/MZ-1200: An upgraded version of the 80K with improved keyboard, more VRAM and a green-screen VDU.
- MZ-700 series (MZ-80K machines with color graphics)
  - MZ-700 (1982): The first MZ without a built-in monitor; an optional data recorder and plotter could also be installed to the machine. More-or-less fully compatible with the MZ-80K. MZ-711 was the basic model without any peripherals, 721 had a builtin cassette tape drive, 731 had the tape drive and integrated four-color plotter.
  - MZ-800 (1983): The first MZ with a 640×200-pixel graphics mode, a Texas Instruments SN76489 sound chip. The model numbers were similar as with the 700 series: 811, 821, and 831. In some markets like Europe instead of a tape drive the 821 and 831 models had a Quick Disk drive. There were also more optional peripherals available, like RAM disks and floppy drives.
  - MZ-1500 (1984): Available in Japan only. Features 320×200-pixel graphics and built-in sound capability using two Texas Instruments SN76489 sound chips. The tape recorder has been replaced with a drive that reads 2.8-inch Quick Disks.

=== MZ-80B group ===
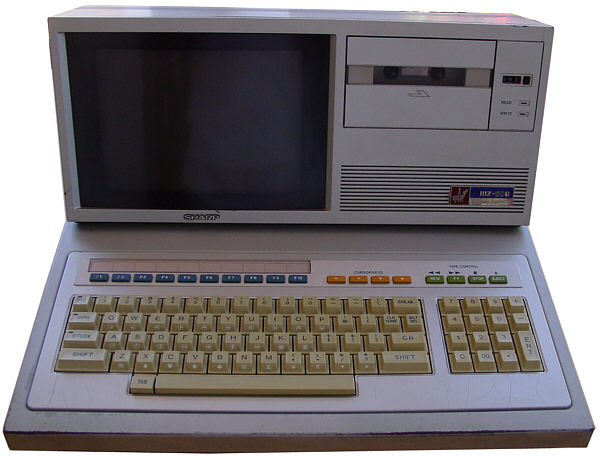
Sharp MZ-80B

This offshoot of the MZ-80K line was primarily marketed for business use.

- MZ-80B series
  - MZ-80B (1981): 320×200-pixel graphics. (Extra VRAM optional)
  - MZ-80B2: An 80B with extra VRAM installed. Sold alongside the MZ-2000 for most of the lineup's lifetime.
  - MZ-2000 (1982): 640×200-pixel monochrome monitor built-in; color optional. BASIC-level compatible with the MZ-80B.
  - MZ-2200 (1983): The only monitorless, standalone unit in the series.
- MZ-2500 (SuperMZ) series: Launched in 1985, the computers in this series all used a Z80B processor running at 6 MHz. They included a data recorder and at least one 3.5 internal floppy disk drive, as well as a YM2203 sound chip, hardware scrolling, and a palette of 256 colors (upgradable to 4096). This makes them among the most powerful 8-bit machines ever released for home use. Some models are also compatible with the MZ-80B and MZ-2000.
  - MZ-2511
  - MZ-2520: The 2511 without a data recorder and the MZ-80B/2000 compatibility modes.
  - MZ-2521
  - MZ-2531(MZ-2500V2) (1986)
- MZ-2800 series
  - MZ-2861 (1987): A hybrid 16-bit machine running on an Intel 80286 and a Z80 for MZ-2500 compatibility. It could run MS-DOS in 16-bit mode, as well as a PC98 emulator.

=== MZ-3500/5500/6500 group ===
A line of business PCs shoehorned into the MZ lineup. All of them feature 5.25-inch floppy disk drives.

- MZ-3500 series (1982): Runs on two Z80A processors.
  - MZ-3541: FDOS and EOS (CP/M compatible)
- MZ-5500 series (1983): An MS-DOS-based machine running on an Intel 8086 processor.
- MZ-6500 series (1984): A high-speed version of the MZ-5500 marketed as a CAD workstation.
  - MZ-6500
  - MZ-6550: A vertically mounted machine with an 80286 processor and a 3.5-inch floppy drive.

=== Other ===
- MZ-100: notebook / laptop with Intel 8088 processor and two 720KB DS/DD 3.5" floppy disk drives.
- MZ-8000 series: A line of PC/AT-compatible machines running on 80286 and 80386 processors.

== See also ==
- Sharp X1
- Sharp MZ character set
