= List of Virtual Console games for Wii =

The following is a list of the Virtual Console games for the Wii; 427 in North America, 395 in the PAL region and 659 in Japan. These games could also be played on the Wii U through Wii Mode, but lack the additional features found in Wii U Virtual Console releases.

In the PAL region, the final update was on September 5, 2013, as the service has been discontinued in all regions. The Virtual Console would go on to continue on the Wii U and 3DS but neither service has seen new games since 2018. A successor to both services that same year was made with the introduction of Nintendo Classics for Nintendo Switch Online.

In Japan, the last new title was released on April 9, 2013.

Nintendo discontinued the Wii Shop Channel on January 31, 2019, worldwide (with the function to add Wii Points and purchase games removed on March 26, 2018). But as of February 1, 2019-current, Wii Shop Channel users can still continue to redownload previously purchased content and/or transfer Wii data over to a Wii U (via the Wii U Transfer Tool—if purchased from the Wii Shop Channel).

== Titles ==
=== Nintendo Entertainment System / Family Computer ===
These games costed 500 Wii Points and can be played with a Wii Remote, Classic Controller, or GameCube controller

Title	Publisher(s)	Platform	North America release date	Europe release date	Oceania release date	Japan release date
Donkey Kong	Nintendo	JP: FC	November 19, 2006	2006-12-08	2006-12-07	December 2, 2006
Mario Bros.	Nintendo	JP: FC	November 19, 2006	2006-12-08	2006-12-07	December 12, 2006
Pinball	Nintendo	JP: FC	November 19, 2006	2006-12-15	2006-12-15	December 2, 2006
Soccer	Nintendo	JP: FC	November 19, 2006	2006-12-22	2006-12-22	December 2, 2006
Solomon's Key	Tecmo	JP: FC	November 19, 2006	2006-12-15	2006-12-15	December 2, 2006
The Legend of Zelda	Nintendo	JP: FDS	November 19, 2006	2006-12-08	2006-12-07	December 2, 2006
Wario's Woods	Nintendo	JP: FC	November 19, 2006	2006-12-08	2006-12-07	December 12, 2006
Baseball	Nintendo	JP: FC	January 1, 2007	2006-12-29	2006-12-29	December 2, 2006
Donkey Kong Jr.	Nintendo	JP: FC	December 4, 2006	2006-12-22	2006-12-22	December 2, 2006
Gomoku Narabe Renju	Nintendo	FC	Unreleased	Unreleased	Unreleased	December 2, 2006
Gradius	Konami	JP: FC	January 8, 2007	2007-02-02	2007-02-02	December 2, 2006
Ice Hockey	Nintendo	JP: FDS	December 11, 2006	2006-12-29	2006-12-29	December 2, 2006
Super Mario Bros.	Nintendo	JP: FC	December 25, 2006	2007-01-05	2007-01-05	December 2, 2006
Tennis	Nintendo	JP: FC	December 18, 2006	2006-12-22	2006-12-22	December 2, 2006
Urban Champion	Nintendo	JP: FC	January 1, 2007	2006-12-15	2006-12-15	December 2, 2006
Xevious	NA: Namco; PAL: Bandai Namco Entertainment; JP: Bandai Namco Games	JP: FC	January 15, 2007	2007-01-12	2007-01-12	December 2, 2006
The Legend of Kage	Taito	JP: FC	February 19, 2007	Unreleased	Unreleased	December 19, 2006
NA: Ninja JaJaMaru-kun (Note: Japan imported title.); PAL: Ninja JaJaMaru-kun (600 Nintendo Points); JP: Ninja JaJaMaru-kun	NA: Jaleco; PAL: Jaleco/Hamster; JP: Jaleco	JP: FC	October 22, 2007	2007-09-21	2007-09-21	December 26, 2006
Ice Climber	Nintendo	JP: FC	February 12, 2007	2007-03-16	2007-03-16	January 16, 2007
Ikki	Sunsoft	FC	Unreleased	Unreleased	Unreleased	January 16, 2007
Kid Icarus	Nintendo	JP: FDS	February 12, 2007	2007-02-23	2007-02-23	January 23, 2007
Zelda II: The Adventure of Link	Nintendo	JP: FDS	June 4, 2007	2007-02-09	2007-02-09	January 23, 2007
Galaga	NA: Bandai Namco; PAL: Bandai Namco Entertainment; JP: Bandai Namco Games	JP: FC	April 9, 2007	2007-03-09	2007-03-09	February 6, 2007
Mighty Bomb Jack	Tecmo	JP: FC	May 7, 2007	2007-04-27	2007-04-27	February 6, 2007
Kirby's Adventure	Nintendo	JP: FC	February 12, 2007	2007-02-16	2007-02-16	February 27, 2007
Excitebike	Nintendo	JP: FC	March 19, 2007	2007-02-16	2007-02-16	March 13, 2007
Elevator Action	Taito	JP: FC	March 5, 2007	Unreleased	Unreleased	April 3, 2007
NA: Lode Runner; PAL: Lode Runner (600 Nintendo Points); JP: Lode Runner	NA: Hudson Soft; PAL: Hudson Soft; JP: Hudson Soft/Konami	JP: FC	June 11, 2007	2010-03-12	2010-03-12	March 6, 2007
NA: Yoshi; PAL: Mario & Yoshi; JP: Yoshi	Nintendo	JP: FC	July 9, 2007	2007-05-16	2007-05-16	March 6, 2007
Tecmo Bowl	Tecmo		March 12, 2007	Unreleased	Unreleased	Unreleased
NA: Teenage Mutant Ninja Turtles (delisted on January 26, 2012); PAL: ~~Teenage Mutant Ninja Turtles~~ (delisted on 2012-01-26); JP: ~~Teenage Mutant Ninja Turtles~~ (delisted on January 24, 2012)	Konami	JP: FC	April 2, 2007	2007-03-16	2007-03-16	April 1, 2008
Valkyrie no Bōken: Toki no Kagi Densetsu	Bandai Namco Games	FC	Unreleased	Unreleased	Unreleased	March 20, 2007
Castlevania	Konami	JP: FDS	April 30, 2007	2007-03-23	2007-03-23	July 17, 2007
Donkey Kong Jr. Math	Nintendo	JP: FC	September 3, 2007	2007-04-20	2007-04-20	March 27, 2007
Punch-Out!!	Nintendo	JP: FC	April 16, 2007	2007-03-30	2007-03-30	April 3, 2007
NA: Milon's Secret Castle; PAL: Milon's Secret Castle (600 Nintendo Points); JP: Milon's Secret Castle	NA: Hudson Soft; PAL: Hudson Soft; JP: Hudson Soft/Konami	JP: FC	June 4, 2007	2010-03-19	2010-03-19	April 10, 2007
NA: Ninja Gaiden; PAL: Ninja Gaiden (600 Nintendo Points); JP: Ninja Gaiden	Tecmo	JP: FC	May 14, 2007	2007-09-21	2007-09-21	April 10, 2007
Pac-Man	NA: Bandai Namco; PAL: Bandai Namco Entertainment; JP: Bandai Namco Games	JP: FC	May 14, 2007	2007-04-13	2007-04-13	April 17, 2007
Gradius II	Konami	FC	Unreleased	Unreleased	Unreleased	April 24, 2007
Exerion	Jaleco	FC	Unreleased	Unreleased	Unreleased	May 1, 2007
NA: Super Mario Bros.: The Lost Levels; PAL: Super Mario Bros.: The Lost Levels (Note: Famicom Disk System title.) (600 Nintendo Points, not available from 2007-10–01 to 2008-08-22); JP: Super Mario Bros. 2	Nintendo	JP: FDS	October 1, 2007	2007-09-14	2007-09-14	May 1, 2007
NA: NES Open Tournament Golf; PAL: NES Open Tournament Golf; JP: Mario Open Golf	Nintendo	JP: FC	June 18, 2007	2007-05-11	2007-05-11	July 24, 2007
Tsuppari Ōzumō	Tecmo	FC	Unreleased	Unreleased	Unreleased	May 15, 2007
Challenger	Hudson Soft/Konami	FC	Unreleased	Unreleased	Unreleased	May 22, 2007
Mach Rider	Nintendo	JP: FC	July 9, 2007	2007-05-25	2007-05-25	September 4, 2007
NA: Super Mario Bros. 2 PAL: Super Mario Bros. 2 JP: Super Mario USA	Nintendo	JP: FC	July 2, 2007	2007-05-25	2007-05-25	August 10, 2007
NA: Adventures of Lolo 2 PAL: Adventures of Lolo 2 JP: Adventures of Lolo	NA: HAL Laboratory; PAL: HAL Laboratory; JP: Nintendo	JP: FC	January 21, 2008	2008-02-01	2008-02-01	June 5, 2007
Front Line	Taito	FC	Unreleased	Unreleased	Unreleased	June 5, 2007
Adventures of Lolo	HAL Laboratory		August 6, 2007	2007-06-08	2007-06-08	Unreleased
Balloon Fight	Nintendo	JP: FC	July 16, 2007	2007-06-08	2007-06-08	November 13, 2007
Field Combat	Jaleco	FC	Unreleased	Unreleased	Unreleased	June 12, 2007
Famicom Mukashibanashi: Shin Onigashima (Parts 1+2)	Nintendo	FDS	Unreleased	Unreleased	Unreleased	June 19, 2007
Mega Man	Capcom	JP: FC	August 18, 2008	2007-06-22	2007-06-22	July 29, 2008
Pooyan	Hudson Soft/Konami	FC	Unreleased	Unreleased	Unreleased	June 26, 2007
Flappy	NetFarm	FC	Unreleased	Unreleased	Unreleased	July 3, 2007
Star Soldier	NA: Hudson Soft; JP: Hudson Soft/Konami	JP: FC	July 30, 2007	Unreleased	Unreleased	July 3, 2007
Metroid	Nintendo	JP: FDS	August 13, 2007	2007-07-20	2007-07-20	March 4, 2008
Antarctic Adventure	Konami	FC	Unreleased	Unreleased	Unreleased	August 7, 2007
Lunar Pool	D4 Enterprise	JP: FC	October 22, 2007	2007-08-10	2007-08-10	December 11, 2007
Volleyball	Nintendo	JP: FDS	November 12, 2007	2007-08-10	2007-08-10	August 21, 2007
Wrecking Crew	Nintendo	JP: FC	November 19, 2007	2007-08-24	2007-08-24	February 5, 2008
NA: Super C PAL: Probotector II: Return of the Evil Forces; JP: Super Contra	Konami	JP: FC	August 27, 2007	2007-10-12	Unreleased	February 12, 2008
NA: Spelunker; PAL: Spelunker (600 Nintendo Points); JP: Spelunker (not available from March 30 to April 2, 2012)	NA: Tozai; PAL: Tozai Games; JP: Irem/Tozai Games	JP: FC	March 17, 2008	2008-09-05	2008-09-05	August 28, 2007
Adventure Island	NA: Hudson Soft; PAL: Hudson Soft; JP: Hudson Soft/Konami	JP: FC	September 3, 2007	2008-02-22	2008-02-22	January 15, 2008
Battle City	Bandai Namco Games	FC	Unreleased	Unreleased	Unreleased	September 4, 2007
NES Play Action Football	Nintendo		September 10, 2007	Unreleased	Unreleased	Unreleased
Bases Loaded	Jaleco	JP: FC	April 7, 2008	Unreleased	Unreleased	September 11, 2007
The Tower of Druaga	Bandai Namco Games	FC	Unreleased	Unreleased	Unreleased	September 25, 2007
Esper Dream	Konami	FDS	Unreleased	Unreleased	Unreleased	October 2, 2007
Zanac	D4 Enterprise	JP: FDS	December 3, 2007	Unreleased	Unreleased	October 9, 2007
Ninja Gaiden II: The Dark Sword of Chaos	Tecmo		October 15, 2007	Unreleased	Unreleased	Unreleased
Famicom Detective Club: The Missing Heir (Vol 1+2)	Nintendo	FDS	Unreleased	Unreleased	Unreleased	October 16, 2007
Castlevania II: Simon's Quest	Konami	JP: FDS	October 29, 2007	2007-10-19	2007-10-19	October 28, 2008
NA: River City Ransom; PAL: Street Gangs; JP: River City Ransom	NA: Aksys Games; PAL: 505 Games; JP: Arc System Works	JP: FC	April 21, 2008	2008-02-22	2008-02-22	October 23, 2007
Hanjuku Hero	Square Enix	FC	Unreleased	Unreleased	Unreleased	October 30, 2007
Super Mario Bros. 3	Nintendo	JP: FC	November 5, 2007	2007-11-09	2007-11-09	December 11, 2007
Ganbare Goemon! Karakuri Dōchū	Konami	FC	Unreleased	Unreleased	Unreleased	November 6, 2007
Double Dribble	Konami		November 26, 2007	2007-11-16	2007-11-16	Unreleased
Ghosts 'n Goblins	Capcom	JP: FC	December 10, 2007	2008-10-31	Unreleased	November 20, 2007
Nuts & Milk	Hudson Soft/Konami	FC	Unreleased	Unreleased	Unreleased	November 20, 2007
Bubble Bobble	Taito	JP: FDS	December 31, 2007	2007-11-23	2007-11-23	May 13, 2008
King's Knight	Square Enix	JP: FC	March 24, 2008	Unreleased	Unreleased	November 27, 2007
Downtown Nekketsu Kōshinkyoku: Soreyuke Daiundōkai	Arc System Works	FC	Unreleased	Unreleased	Unreleased	December 4, 2007
Mega Man 2	Capcom	JP: FC	September 15, 2008	2007-12-14	2007-12-14	August 26, 2008
Metal Slader Glory	HAL Laboratory	FC	Unreleased	Unreleased	Unreleased	December 18, 2007
Blades of Steel	Konami		December 24, 2007	2007-12-21	2007-12-21	Unreleased
Skate or Die!	Konami		Unreleased	2007-12-21	2007-12-21	Unreleased
StarTropics	Nintendo		January 7, 2008	2008-01-11	2008-01-11	Unreleased
Yie Ar Kung-Fu	Konami	FC	Unreleased	Unreleased	Unreleased	January 8, 2008
Devil World	Nintendo	JP: FC	Unreleased	2008-10-31	2008-10-31	January 22, 2008
Mappy	Bandai Namco Games	FC	Unreleased	Unreleased	Unreleased	January 29, 2008
Operation Wolf	Taito		February 4, 2008	2008-03-14	2008-03-14	Unreleased
Ninja Gaiden III: The Ancient Ship of Doom	Tecmo		February 18, 2008	Unreleased	Unreleased	Unreleased
Tantei Jingūji Saburō: Shinjuku Chūō Kōen Satsujin Jiken	Arc System Works	FDS	Unreleased	Unreleased	Unreleased	February 19, 2008
Star Luster	Bandai Namco Games	FC	Unreleased	Unreleased	Unreleased	March 4, 2008
City Connection	NA: Jaleco; PAL: Jaleco/Hamster; JP: Jaleco	JP: FC	May 26, 2008	2008-07-25	2008-07-25	March 11, 2008
Joy Mech Fight	Nintendo	FC	Unreleased	Unreleased	Unreleased	March 11, 2008
Renegade	NA: Aksys Games; JP: Arc System Works	JP: FC	May 5, 2008	Unreleased	Unreleased	March 18, 2008
Sky Kid	NA: Bandai Namco; JP: Bandai Namco Games	JP: FC	May 19, 2008	Unreleased	Unreleased	April 1, 2008
NA: Yoshi's Cookie (delisted on October 18, 2013); PAL: ~~Yoshi's Cookie~~ (delisted on 2013-10-11); JP: ~~Yoshi's Cookie~~ (delisted on October 11, 2013)	Nintendo	JP: FC	April 7, 2008	2008-04-04	2008-04-04	June 10, 2008
Bokosuka Wars	Enterbrain	FC	Unreleased	Unreleased	Unreleased	April 8, 2008
Volguard II	NetFarm	FC	Unreleased	Unreleased	Unreleased	April 8, 2008
Double Dragon	NA: Aksys Games; PAL: 505 Games; JP: Arc System Works	JP: FC	April 28, 2008	2008-04-25	2008-04-25	February 24, 2009
NA: Bio Miracle Bokutte Upa; PAL: Bio Miracle Bokutte Upa (600 Nintendo Points); JP: Bio Miracle Bokutte Upa	Konami	JP: FDS	June 9, 2008	2008-08-29	2008-08-29	June 3, 2008
NA: Dig Dug; PAL: Dig Dug (600 Nintendo Points); JP: Dig Dug	NA: Bandai Namco; PAL: Bandai Namco Entertainment; JP: Bandai Namco Games	JP: FC	June 9, 2008	2008-08-29	2008-08-29	July 1, 2008
Transformers: Mystery of Convoy	Takara Tomy	FC	Unreleased	Unreleased	Unreleased	June 10, 2008
NA: Super Dodge Ball; JP: Super Dodge Ball	NA: Aksys Games; JP: Arc System Works	JP: FC	September 22, 2008	Unreleased	Unreleased	June 17, 2008
Chack'n Pop	Taito	FC	Unreleased	Unreleased	Unreleased	July 8, 2008
Donkey Kong 3	Nintendo	JP: FC	July 14, 2008	2009-01-09	2009-01-09	July 23, 2008
TwinBee	Konami	FC	Unreleased	Unreleased	Unreleased	August 5, 2008
The Mysterious Murasame Castle	Nintendo	FDS	Unreleased	Unreleased	Unreleased	August 19, 2008
NA: Clu Clu Land; PAL: Clu Clu Land; JP: Clu Clu Land: Welcome to New Clu Clu Land	Nintendo	JP: FDS	September 1, 2008	2009-03-06	2009-03-06	March 10, 2009
Tantei Jingūji Saburō: Yokohama-kō Renzoku Satsujin Jiken	Arc System Works	FC	Unreleased	Unreleased	Unreleased	September 2, 2008
Wagyan Land	Bandai Namco Games	FC	Unreleased	Unreleased	Unreleased	September 24, 2008
Nintendo World Cup	Arc System Works	FC	Unreleased	Unreleased	Unreleased	October 7, 2008
Kanshaku Tamanage Kantarō no Tōkaidō Gojūsan-tsugi	Sunsoft	FC	Unreleased	Unreleased	Unreleased	October 14, 2008
Castlevania III: Dracula's Curse	Konami	JP: FC	January 12, 2009	2008-10-31	2008-10-31	April 21, 2009
Mega Man 3	Capcom	JP: FC	November 10, 2008	2008-11-14	2008-11-14	November 4, 2008
Dragon Buster	Bandai Namco Games	FC	Unreleased	Unreleased	Unreleased	November 18, 2008
Smash Ping Pong	Nintendo	FDS	Unreleased	Unreleased	Unreleased	November 25, 2008
Atlantis no Nazo	Sunsoft	FC	Unreleased	Unreleased	Unreleased	December 2, 2008
Ninja-Kid	Jaleco	FC	Unreleased	Unreleased	Unreleased	December 9, 2008
NA: Life Force; JP: Salamander	Konami	JP: FC	February 16, 2009	Unreleased	Unreleased	December 24, 2008
NA: Zoda's Revenge: StarTropics II; PAL: Zoda's Revenge: StarTropics II (600 Nintendo Points)	Nintendo		December 29, 2008	2009-07-10	2009-07-10	Unreleased
Tantei Jingūji Saburō: Kiken na Futari (Part 1+2)	Arc System Works	FDS	Unreleased	Unreleased	Unreleased	January 6, 2009
Zoids: Mokushiroku	Takara Tomy	FC	Unreleased	Unreleased	Unreleased	January 13, 2009
Getsu Fūma Den	Konami	FC	Unreleased	Unreleased	Unreleased	January 27, 2009
Formation Z	Jaleco	FC	Unreleased	Unreleased	Unreleased	February 3, 2009
Takeshi's Challenge	Taito	FC	Unreleased	Unreleased	Unreleased	March 31, 2009
Downtown Special: Kunio-kun no Jidaigeki da yo Zenin Shūgō!	Arc System Works	FC	Unreleased	Unreleased	Unreleased	May 12, 2009
Famicom Wars	Nintendo	FC	Unreleased	Unreleased	Unreleased	May 19, 2009
Ninja-Kid II	Jaleco	FC	Unreleased	Unreleased	Unreleased	May 19, 2009
NA: Final Fantasy; PAL: Final Fantasy (600 Nintendo Points); JP: Final Fantasy	NA: Square Enix; PAL: Square Enix; JP: Square Enix	JP: FC	October 5, 2009	2010-05-07	2010-05-07	May 26, 2009
Final Fantasy II	Square Enix	FC	Unreleased	Unreleased	Unreleased	June 16, 2009
Tantei Jingūji Saburō: Toki no Sugiyuku Mama ni...	Arc System Works	FC	Unreleased	Unreleased	Unreleased	June 30, 2009
Smash Table Tennis (600 Nintendo Points)	Nintendo		Unreleased	2009-07-17	2009-07-17	Unreleased
Final Fantasy III	Square Enix	FC	Unreleased	Unreleased	Unreleased	July 21, 2009
Ike Ike! Nekketsu Hockey Bu: Subette Koronde Dairantō	Arc System Works	FC	Unreleased	Unreleased	Unreleased	August 18, 2009
NA: Crash 'N' The Boys: Street Challenge; JP: Crash 'n' the Boys: Street Challenge	NA: Aksys Games; JP: Arc System Works	JP: FC	September 14, 2009	Unreleased	Unreleased	October 18, 2011
Fire Emblem: Shadow Dragon and the Blade of Light	Nintendo	FC	Unreleased	Unreleased	Unreleased	October 20, 2009
Championship Lode Runner	Hudson Soft/Konami	FC	Unreleased	Unreleased	Unreleased	October 27, 2009
Fire Emblem Gaiden	Nintendo	FC	Unreleased	Unreleased	Unreleased	November 4, 2009
A Boy and His Blob: Trouble on Blobolonia	Majesco		November 23, 2009	2009-12-18	2009-12-18	Unreleased
NA: Blaster Master; PAL: Blaster Master; JP: Blaster Master	Sunsoft	JP: FC	December 14, 2009	2010-04-09	2010-04-09	June 29, 2010
Famicom Detective Club: The Girl Who Stands Behind (Part 1+2)	Nintendo	FDS	Unreleased	Unreleased	Unreleased	December 22, 2009
Princess Tomato in the Salad Kingdom	NA: Hudson Soft; JP: Hudson Soft/Konami	JP: FC	February 8, 2010	Unreleased	Unreleased	January 19, 2010
Mega Man 4	Capcom	JP: FC	April 19, 2010	2010-04-16	2010-04-16	February 9, 2010
Metal Max	Enterbrain	FC	Unreleased	Unreleased	Unreleased	April 27, 2010
NA: Shadow of the Ninja; PAL: Shadow of the Ninja (600 Nintendo Points)	Natsume Inc.		June 14, 2010	2010-07-09	2010-07-09	Unreleased
SD Gundam World - Gachapon Senshi: Scramble Wars	Bandai Namco Games	FDS	Unreleased	Unreleased	Unreleased	June 15, 2010
Ufouria: The Saga	Sunsoft	JP: FC	August 23, 2010	2010-07-02	2010-07-02	March 29, 2011
Stinger	Konami	FC	Unreleased	Unreleased	Unreleased	July 27, 2010
Faxanadu	NA: Hudson Soft; PAL: Hudson Soft; JP: Hudson Soft/Konami	JP: FC	February 21, 2011	2010-11-26	2010-11-26	October 5, 2010
Adventure Island II	PAL: Hudson Soft; JP: Hudson Soft/Konami	JP: FC	Unreleased	2011-04-15	2011-04-15	December 28, 2010
NA: S.C.A.T.: Special Cybernetic Attack Team; PAL: S.C.A.T. (600 Nintendo Points)	Natsume Inc.		February 7, 2011	2011-02-04	2011-02-04	Unreleased
SD Gundam World - Gachapon Senshi 2: Capsule Senki	Bandai Namco Games	FC	Unreleased	Unreleased	Unreleased	February 15, 2011
Mega Man 5	Capcom	JP: FC	June 16, 2011	2012-03-29	2012-03-29	May 31, 2011
BurgerTime	G-Mode	JP: FDS	December 6, 2012	Unreleased	Unreleased	July 12, 2011
Binary Land	Hudson Soft/Konami	FC	Unreleased	Unreleased	Unreleased	July 26, 2011
Seicross	Hamster	FC	Unreleased	Unreleased	Unreleased	September 20, 2011
Sugoro Quest: Dice Heroes	Arc System Works	FC	Unreleased	Unreleased	Unreleased	November 29, 2011
Ganbare Goemon 2	Konami	FC	Unreleased	Unreleased	Unreleased	January 24, 2012
Double Dragon II: The Revenge	NA: Aksys Games; PAL: Aksys Games; JP: Arc System Works	JP: FC	June 21, 2012	2012-07-19	2012-07-19	March 6, 2012
Ganbare Goemon Gaiden: Kieta Ōgon Kiseru	Konami	FC	Unreleased	Unreleased	Unreleased	May 1, 2012

=== Super Nintendo Entertainment System / Super Famicom ===
Title	Publisher(s)	North America release date	Europe release date	Oceania release date	Japan release date
F-Zero	Nintendo	November 19, 2006	2006-12-08	2006-12-07	December 2, 2006
NA: SimCity (delisted on January 2, 2013); PAL: SimCity; JP: SimCity	Nintendo	November 19, 2006	2006-12-29	2006-12-29	December 26, 2006
NA: Street Fighter II: The World Warrior (delisted in October 2014); PAL: Street Fighter II: The World Warrior; JP: Street Fighter II: The World Warrior	Capcom	December 25, 2006	2007-01-19	2007-01-19	December 2, 2006
NA: Super Castlevania IV; PAL: Super Castlevania IV; JP: Akumajō Dracula	Konami	December 25, 2006	2006-12-29	2006-12-29	December 2, 2006
Super Mario World	Nintendo	February 5, 2007	2007-02-09	2007-02-09	December 2, 2006
NA: The Legend of Zelda: A Link to the Past; PAL: The Legend of Zelda: A Link to the Past; JP: Zelda no Densetsu: Kamigami no Triforce	Nintendo	January 22, 2007	2007-03-23	2007-03-23	December 2, 2006
NA: Donkey Kong Country (not available from November 16, 2012, to February 26, 2015); PAL: Donkey Kong Country (not available from 2012-11–25 to 2014-10-30); JP: Super Donkey Kong (not available from December 7, 2012, to November 26, 2014)	Nintendo	February 19, 2007	2006-12-08	2006-12-07	December 12, 2006
PAL: Mario's Super Picross (900 Nintendo Points); JP: Mario no Super Picross	Nintendo	Unreleased	2007-09-14	2007-09-14	December 19, 2006
Fire Emblem: Monshō no Nazo	Nintendo	Unreleased	Unreleased	Unreleased	December 26, 2006
NA: R-Type III: The Third Lightning (delisted on January 2, 2013); PAL: ~~R-Type III: The Third Lightning~~ (delisted on 2012-03-31); JP: ~~R-Type III: The Third Lightning~~ (delisted on March 30, 2012)	NA: Jaleco; PAL: Irem; JP: Irem	January 15, 2007	2007-02-16	2007-02-16	December 26, 2006
NA: Contra III: The Alien Wars; PAL: Super Probotector: Alien Rebels; JP: Contra Spirits	Konami	January 29, 2007	2007-01-19	2007-01-19	January 16, 2007
Fire Emblem: Seisen no Keifu	Nintendo	Unreleased	Unreleased	Unreleased	January 30, 2007
Kamaitachi no Yoru	Chunsoft	Unreleased	Unreleased	Unreleased	February 13, 2007
Shin Megami Tensei	Atlus	Unreleased	Unreleased	Unreleased	February 13, 2007
NA: Romance of the Three Kingdoms IV: Wall of Fire; JP: Sangokushi IV	Koei	March 26, 2007	Unreleased	Unreleased	February 20, 2007
NA: Super Ghouls 'n Ghosts; PAL: Super Ghouls 'n Ghosts; JP: Chou Makaimura	Capcom	March 5, 2007	2007-03-09	2007-03-09	February 20, 2007
NA: The Legend of the Mystical Ninja; PAL: The Legend of the Mystical Ninja; JP: Ganbare Goemon: Yukihime Kyūshutsu Emaki	Konami	April 30, 2007	2007-03-30	2007-03-30	March 13, 2007
ActRaiser	Square Enix	May 28, 2007	2007-04-13	2007-04-13	March 20, 2007
Heracles no Eikō III: Kamigami no Chinmoku	Paon	Unreleased	Unreleased	Unreleased	April 6, 2007
NA: Final Fight (delisted in October 2014); PAL: Final Fight; JP: Final Fight	Capcom	May 7, 2007	2007-04-27	2007-04-27	April 17, 2007
NA: Gradius III; PAL: Gradius III (900 Nintendo Points); JP: Gradius III	Konami	April 23, 2007	2007-09-28	2007-09-28	September 25, 2007
NA: Kirby's Dream Course; PAL: Kirby's Dream Course; JP: Kirby Bowl	Nintendo	July 23, 2007	2007-06-29	2007-06-29	April 24, 2007
NA: Donkey Kong Country 2: Diddy's Kong Quest (not available from November 16, 2012, to February 26, 2015); PAL: Donkey Kong Country 2: Diddy's Kong Quest (not available from 2012-11–25 to 2014-10-30); JP: Super Donkey Kong 2: Dixie & Diddy (not available from December 7, 2012, to November 26, 2014)	Nintendo	May 21, 2007	2007-05-16	2007-05-16	October 23, 2007
Magical Drop	G-Mode	Unreleased	Unreleased	Unreleased	May 29, 2007
NA: Street Fighter II Turbo: Hyper Fighting (delisted in October 2014); PAL: Street Fighter II' Turbo: Hyper Fighting; JP: Street Fighter II Turbo: Hyper Fighting	Capcom	June 25, 2007	2007-07-20	2007-07-20	August 10, 2007
NA: Breath of Fire II; PAL: Breath of Fire II; JP: Breath of Fire II: Shimei no Ko	Capcom	August 27, 2007	2007-08-10	2007-08-10	June 26, 2007
NA: Metal Marines; JP: Militia	NA: Bandai Namco; JP: Bandai Namco Games	October 15, 2007	Unreleased	Unreleased	July 10, 2007
Famicom Bunko: Hajimari no Mori	Nintendo	Unreleased	Unreleased	Unreleased	July 17, 2007
Fushigi no Dungeon 2: Fūrai no Shiren	Chunsoft	Unreleased	Unreleased	Unreleased	July 24, 2007
NA: Kirby's Avalanche; PAL: Kirby's Ghost Trap	Nintendo	September 24, 2007	2007-07-27	2007-07-27	Unreleased
Super Metroid	Nintendo	August 20, 2007	2007-10-12	2007-10-12	September 20, 2007
Otogirisō	Chunsoft	Unreleased	Unreleased	Unreleased	August 28, 2007
Vegas Stakes	Nintendo	November 26, 2007	2007-08-31	2007-08-31	Unreleased
Axelay	Konami	November 12, 2007	Unreleased	2007-10-12	May 7, 2008
NA: Cybernator; PAL: Cybernator; JP: Jūsō Kihei Valken	NA: Hudson Soft; PAL: Hudson Soft; JP: Hudson Soft/Konami	December 17, 2007	2007-12-07	2007-12-07	October 16, 2007
Panel de Pon	Nintendo	Unreleased	Unreleased	Unreleased	November 27, 2007
NA: Super Street Fighter II: The New Challengers (delisted in October 2014); PAL: Super Street Fighter II: The New Challengers; JP: Super Street Fighter II: The New Challengers	Capcom	January 21, 2008	2008-01-25	2008-01-25	December 18, 2007
NA: Donkey Kong Country 3: Dixie Kong's Double Trouble! (not available from November 16, 2012, to February 26, 2015); PAL: Donkey Kong Country 3: Dixie Kong's Double Trouble! (not available from 2012-11–25 to 2014-10-30); JP: Super Donkey Kong 3: Nazo no Krems Shima (not available from December 7, 2012, to November 26, 2014)	Nintendo	December 24, 2007	2007-12-25	2007-12-25	October 21, 2008
Treasure Hunter G	Square Enix	Unreleased	Unreleased	Unreleased	December 25, 2007
Harvest Moon	NA: Natsume Inc. PAL: Marvelous Entertainment	February 11, 2008	2008-01-04	2008-01-04	Unreleased
Pac-Attack	NA: Bandai Namco; PAL: Bandai Namco Entertainment	January 14, 2008	2008-06-27	2008-06-27	Unreleased
NA: Super R-Type (delisted on March 30, 2012); PAL: ~~Super R-Type~~ (delisted on 2012-03-31); JP: ~~Super R-Type~~ (delisted on March 30, 2012)	Irem	March 17, 2008	2008-03-14	2008-03-14	January 29, 2008
Cosmo Gang the Puzzle	Bandai Namco Games	Unreleased	Unreleased	Unreleased	February 12, 2008
NA: DoReMi Fantasy: Milon's DokiDoki Adventure; PAL: DoReMi Fantasy: Milon's DokiDoki Adventure (900 Nintendo Points); JP: DoReMi Fantasy: Milon no Dokidoki Daibouken	NA: Hudson Soft; PAL: Hudson Soft; JP: Hudson Soft/Konami	March 10, 2008	2008-09-05	2008-09-05	February 26, 2008
Super Turrican	Factor 5	March 3, 2008	2008-02-29	2008-02-29	Unreleased
Super Gussun Oyoyo	Bandai Namco Games	Unreleased	Unreleased	Unreleased	March 18, 2008
Heracles no Eikō IV: Kamigami kara no Okurimono	Paon	Unreleased	Unreleased	Unreleased	April 22, 2008
Famicom Tantei Club Part II: Ushiro ni Tatsu Shōjo	Nintendo	Unreleased	Unreleased	Unreleased	April 30, 2008
Front Mission Series: Gun Hazard	Square Enix	Unreleased	Unreleased	Unreleased	May 20, 2008
Ganbare Goemon 2: Kiteretsu Shōgun Magginesu	Konami	Unreleased	Unreleased	Unreleased	May 27, 2008
NA: Super Mario RPG: Legend of the Seven Stars; PAL: Super Mario RPG: Legend of the Seven Stars (900 Nintendo Points); JP: Super Mario RPG	Nintendo	September 1, 2008	2008-08-22	2008-08-22	June 24, 2008
Fire Emblem: Thracia 776	Nintendo	Unreleased	Unreleased	Unreleased	July 15, 2008
Gakkou de atta Kowai Hanashi	Bandai Namco Games	Unreleased	Unreleased	Unreleased	August 5, 2008
NA: Secret of Mana; PAL: Secret of Mana; JP: Seiken Densetsu 2	Square Enix	October 13, 2008	2008-12-26	2008-12-26	September 9, 2008
Space Invaders: The Original Game	Taito	November 17, 2008	2008-11-28	2008-11-28	September 16, 2008
Super Turrican 2 (delisted on October 7, 2013)	Factor 5	September 29, 2008	Unreleased	Unreleased	Unreleased
NA: Ogre Battle: The March of the Black Queen; PAL: Ogre Battle: The March of the Black Queen (900 Nintendo Points); JP: Densetsu no Ogre Battle	NA: Square Enix; PAL: Square Enix; JP: Square Enix	March 2, 2009	2009-07-03	2009-07-03	November 11, 2008
NA: Nobunaga's Ambition; JP: Super Nobunaga no Yabou: Zenkokuban	NA: Tecmo; JP: Koei	April 27, 2009	Unreleased	Unreleased	December 24, 2008
NA: Kirby's Dream Land 3 PAL: Kirby's Dream Land 3 (900 Nintendo Points); JP: Hoshi no Kirby 3	Nintendo	January 5, 2009	2009-07-24	2009-07-24	April 28, 2009
Tactics Ogre: Let Us Cling Together	Square Enix	Unreleased	Unreleased	Unreleased	February 10, 2009
NA: Uncharted Waters: New Horizons; JP: Daikōkai Jidai II	NA: Tecmo; JP: Koei	April 6, 2009	Unreleased	Unreleased	March 17, 2009
Super Punch-Out!!	Nintendo	March 30, 2009	2009-03-20	2009-03-20	July 7, 2009
Der Langrisser	Hudson Soft/Konami	Unreleased	Unreleased	Unreleased	April 14, 2009
Super Wagan Land	Bandai Namco Games	Unreleased	Unreleased	Unreleased	June 2, 2009
NA: Genghis Khan II: Clan of the Gray Wolf; JP: Super Aoki Ōkami to Shiroki Mejika: Genchou Hishi	NA: Tecmo; JP: Koei	June 8, 2009	Unreleased	Unreleased	May 11, 2010
Super Mario Kart	Nintendo	November 23, 2009	2010-04-02	2010-04-02	June 9, 2009
NA: Final Fantasy II; PAL: Final Fantasy II (900 Nintendo Points); JP: Final Fantasy IV	NA: Square Enix; PAL: Square Enix; JP: Square Enix	March 8, 2010	2010-06-11	2010-06-11	August 4, 2009
Super Star Wars	LucasArts	August 10, 2009	2009-09-18	2009-09-18	Unreleased
Pilotwings	Nintendo	December 28, 2009	2009-08-21	2009-08-21	April 6, 2010
Super Star Wars: The Empire Strikes Back	LucasArts	August 24, 2009	2009-10-02	2009-10-02	Unreleased
Taikou Risshiden	Koei	Unreleased	Unreleased	Unreleased	September 1, 2009
Super Star Wars: Return of the Jedi	LucasArts	September 7, 2009	2009-10-16	2009-10-16	Unreleased
Ganbare Goemon 3: Shishijūrokubē no Karakuri Manji Gatame	Konami	Unreleased	Unreleased	Unreleased	September 15, 2009
Bahamut Lagoon	Square Enix	Unreleased	Unreleased	Unreleased	September 29, 2009
NA: Final Fight 2 (delisted in October 2014); PAL: Final Fight 2	Capcom	October 12, 2009	2009-10-09	2009-10-09	Unreleased
NA: Kirby Super Star; PAL: Kirby's Fun Pak; JP: Hoshi no Kirby Super Deluxe	Nintendo	May 17, 2010	2010-05-28	2010-05-28	October 13, 2009
NA: Zombies Ate My Neighbors; PAL: Zombies	LucasArts	October 26, 2009	2009-10-30	2009-10-30	Unreleased
Indiana Jones' Greatest Adventures	LucasArts	November 16, 2009	2010-04-23	2010-04-23	Unreleased
Romancing SaGa	Square Enix	Unreleased	Unreleased	Unreleased	November 24, 2009
The Combatribes	Aksys Games	November 30, 2009	Unreleased	Unreleased	Unreleased
NA: Street Fighter Alpha 2 (delisted in October 2014); PAL: Street Fighter Alpha 2	Capcom	December 7, 2009	2010-01-29	2010-01-29	Unreleased
NA: Final Fight 3 (delisted in October 2014); PAL: Final Fight 3 JP: Final Fight Tough	Capcom	January 4, 2010	2010-02-05	2010-02-05	December 8, 2009
Kirby no Kirakira Kizzu	Nintendo	Unreleased	Unreleased	Unreleased	January 5, 2010
Ghoul Patrol	LucasArts	January 25, 2010	2010-05-14	2010-05-14	Unreleased
Super Famicom Wars	Nintendo	Unreleased	Unreleased	Unreleased	February 16, 2010
Sutte Hakkun	Nintendo	Unreleased	Unreleased	Unreleased	March 2, 2010
Romancing SaGa 2	Square Enix	Unreleased	Unreleased	Unreleased	March 23, 2010
Darius Twin	Taito	December 13, 2010	Unreleased	Unreleased	April 13, 2010
Heisei Shin Onigashima (Zenpen)	Nintendo	Unreleased	Unreleased	Unreleased	May 25, 2010
Wild Guns	Natsume Inc.	May 31, 2010	2010-08-13	2010-08-13	Unreleased
Heisei Shin Onigashima (Kouhen)	Nintendo	Unreleased	Unreleased	Unreleased	June 1, 2010
Metal Max 2	Enterbrain	Unreleased	Unreleased	Unreleased	July 13, 2010
Aero the Acro-Bat	Sunsoft	July 26, 2010	2010-07-23	2010-07-23	Unreleased
Clock Tower	Sunsoft	Unreleased	Unreleased	Unreleased	August 3, 2010
Aero the Acro-Bat 2	Sunsoft	September 20, 2010	2010-08-06	2010-08-06	Unreleased
Shin Megami Tensei II	Atlus	Unreleased	Unreleased	Unreleased	September 7, 2010
Romancing SaGa 3	Square Enix	Unreleased	Unreleased	Unreleased	September 21, 2010
NA: Final Fantasy Mystic Quest; PAL: Mystic Quest Legend; JP: Final Fantasy USA: Mystic Quest	NA: Square Enix; PAL: Square Enix; JP: Square Enix	October 18, 2010	2010-09-24	2010-09-24	December 21, 2010
NA: Rival Turf! PAL: Rival Turf! JP: Rushing Beat	NA: Jaleco; PAL: Jaleco/Hamster; JP: Jaleco	May 2, 2011	2010-10-08	2010-10-08	December 7, 2010
Albert Odyssey	Sunsoft	Unreleased	Unreleased	Unreleased	October 19, 2010
Super E.D.F.: Earth Defense Force	NA: Jaleco; PAL: Jaleco/Hamster; JP: Jaleco	July 14, 2011	2010-10-29	2010-10-29	January 11, 2011
PAL: Super Bonk (900 Nintendo Points); JP: Chō Genjin	PAL: Hudson Soft; JP: Hudson Soft/Konami	Unreleased	2010-12-10	2010-12-10	November 16, 2010
Bishōjo Janshi Suchie-Pai	Jaleco	Unreleased	Unreleased	Unreleased	November 24, 2010
Final Fantasy V	Square Enix	Unreleased	Unreleased	Unreleased	January 18, 2011
Shin Megami Tensei if...	Atlus	Unreleased	Unreleased	Unreleased	February 1, 2011
NA: Natsume Championship Wrestling; PAL: Natsume Championship Wrestling (900 Nintendo Points)	Natsume Inc.	March 21, 2011	2011-02-18	2011-02-18	Unreleased
NA: The Ignition Factor; PAL: The Ignition Factor (900 Nintendo Points); JP: Fire Fighting	NA: Jaleco; PAL: Jaleco/Hamster; JP: Jaleco	August 25, 2011	2011-04-29	2011-04-29	March 1, 2011
NA: Final Fantasy III; PAL: Final Fantasy III (900 Nintendo Points); JP: Final Fantasy VI	NA: Square Enix; PAL: Square Enix; JP: Square Enix	June 30, 2011	2011-03-18	2011-03-18	March 15, 2011
NA: Brawl Brothers; PAL: Brawl Brothers; JP: Rushing Beat Ran: Fukusei Toshi	NA: Jaleco; PAL: Jaleco/Hamster; JP: Jaleco	July 28, 2011	2011-04-01	2011-04-01	May 10, 2011
Super Bonk	Hudson Soft	April 4, 2011	Unreleased	Unreleased	Unreleased
NA: Mega Man X PAL: Mega Man X JP: Rockman X	Capcom	April 18, 2011	2012-03-08	2012-03-08	April 5, 2011
NA: Chrono Trigger; PAL: Chrono Trigger (900 Nintendo Points); JP: Chrono Trigger	Square Enix	May 16, 2011	2011-05-20	2011-05-20	April 26, 2011
NA: Super Adventure Island; PAL: Super Adventure Island; JP: Takahashi Meijin no Daibōken Jima	Hudson Soft	May 30, 2011	2011-05-13	2011-05-13	June 28, 2011
Rudra no Hihō	Square Enix	Unreleased	Unreleased	Unreleased	June 7, 2011
NA: Super Adventure Island II; PAL: Super Adventure Island II; JP: Takahashi Meijin no Daibōken Jima II	Hudson Soft	August 11, 2011	2011-06-10	2011-06-10	August 23, 2011
Majin Tensei	Atlus	Unreleased	Unreleased	Unreleased	September 6, 2011
Gōketsuji Ichizoku	Atlus	Unreleased	Unreleased	Unreleased	October 4, 2011
Metal Max Returns	Enterbrain	Unreleased	Unreleased	Unreleased	November 15, 2011
Majin Tensei II: Spiral Nemesis	Atlus	Unreleased	Unreleased	Unreleased	December 13, 2011
NA: Mega Man X2; PAL: Mega Man X2; JP: Rockman X2	Capcom	June 14, 2012	2012-05-31	2012-05-31	December 27, 2011
NA: Prince of Persia; PAL: Prince of Persia; JP: Prince of Persia	Ubisoft	September 6, 2012	2012-01-19	2012-01-19	April 10, 2012
Kunio-kun no Dodgeball da yo Zenin Shūgō!	Arc System Works	Unreleased	Unreleased	Unreleased	February 14, 2012
Kai: Tsukikomori	Bandai Namco Games	Unreleased	Unreleased	Unreleased	June 5, 2012
Kyūyaku Megami Tensei: Megami Tensei I・II	Atlus	Unreleased	Unreleased	Unreleased	July 3, 2012

=== Nintendo 64 ===
These games costed 1,000 Wii Points and can be played with a Classic Controller or GameCube Controller.

Title	Publisher(s)	North America release date	Europe release date	Australia release date	Japan release date
Super Mario 64	Nintendo	November 19, 2006	2006-12-08	2006-12-07	December 2, 2006
Mario Kart 64	Nintendo	January 29, 2007	2007-01-26	2007-01-26	January 30, 2007
NA: The Legend of Zelda: Ocarina of Time; PAL: The Legend of Zelda: Ocarina of Time; JP: Zelda no Densetsu: Toki no Okarina	Nintendo	February 26, 2007	2007-02-23	2007-02-23	February 27, 2007
NA: Star Fox 64; PAL: Lylat Wars; JP: Star Fox 64	Nintendo	April 2, 2007	2007-04-20	2007-04-20	April 17, 2007
NA: F-Zero X PAL: F-Zero X JP: F-Zero X	Nintendo	June 25, 2007	2007-06-15	2007-06-15	May 29, 2007
NA: Paper Mario; PAL: Paper Mario; JP: Mario Story	Nintendo	July 16, 2007	2007-07-13	2007-07-13	July 10, 2007
Wave Race 64	Nintendo	August 6, 2007	2007-08-17	2007-08-17	July 31, 2007
NA: Yoshi's Story; PAL: Yoshi's Story; JP: Yoshi Story	Nintendo	September 17, 2007	2007-10-26	2007-10-26	October 30, 2007
NA: Sin and Punishment; PAL: Sin and Punishment (1200 Nintendo Points); JP: Tsumi to Batsu: Hoshi no Keishōsha	Nintendo	October 1, 2007	2007-09-28	2007-09-28	September 20, 2007
Pokémon Snap	Nintendo	December 10, 2007	2007-12-11	2007-12-11	December 4, 2007
1080° Snowboarding	Nintendo	January 28, 2008	2008-01-18	2008-01-18	January 15, 2008
Custom Robo V2	Nintendo	Unreleased	Unreleased	Unreleased	February 19, 2008
NA: Kirby 64: The Crystal Shards; PAL: Kirby 64: The Crystal Shards; JP: Hoshi no Kirby 64	Nintendo	February 25, 2008	2008-03-07	2008-03-07	April 15, 2008
Cruis'n USA	Nintendo	March 31, 2008	2008-03-28	2008-03-28	Unreleased
Pokémon Puzzle League	Nintendo	May 5, 2008	2008-05-30	2008-05-30	Unreleased
NA: Mario Golf; PAL: Mario Golf; JP: Mario Golf 64	Nintendo	October 6, 2008	2009-01-23	2009-01-23	September 30, 2008
NA: Super Smash Bros. PAL: Super Smash Bros. JP: Nintendo All-Star! Dairantō Smash Brothers	Nintendo	December 21, 2009	2009-06-12	2009-06-12	January 20, 2009
NA: The Legend of Zelda: Majora's Mask; PAL: The Legend of Zelda: Majora's Mask; JP: Zelda no Densetsu: Mujura no Kamen	Nintendo	May 18, 2009	2009-04-03	2009-04-03	April 7, 2009
NA: Ogre Battle 64: Person of Lordly Caliber; PAL: Ogre Battle 64: Person of Lordly Caliber (1200 Nintendo Points); JP: Ogre Battle 64: Person of Lordly Caliber	NA: Square Enix; PAL: Square Enix; JP: Nintendo	March 29, 2010	2010-03-26	2010-03-26	January 26, 2010
NA: Mario Tennis; PAL: Mario Tennis; JP: Mario Tennis 64	Nintendo	June 28, 2010	2010-06-18	2010-06-18	August 31, 2010
Mario Party 2	Nintendo	December 20, 2010	2010-12-24	2010-12-24	November 2, 2010
NA: Bomberman Hero; PAL: Bomberman Hero; JP: Bomberman Hero: Millian-Oujo wo Sukue!	NA: Hudson Soft; PAL: Hudson Soft; JP: Hudson Soft/Konami	March 7, 2011	2011-03-04	2011-03-04	November 1, 2011

=== TurboGrafx-16 / PC Engine ===
Title	Publisher(s)	Platform	North America release date	Europe release date	Australia release date	Japan release date
NA: Bomberman '94; PAL: Bomberman '94 (700 Nintendo Points); JP: Bomberman '94	NA: Hudson Soft; PAL: Hudson Soft; JP: Hudson Soft/Konami	NA: TG16; PAL: TG16; JP: PCE	March 23, 2009	2009-07-10	2009-07-10	December 2, 2006
NA: Bonk's Adventure; PAL: Bonk's Adventure; JP: PC Genjin: Pithecanthropus Computerurus	NA: Hudson Soft; PAL: Hudson Soft; JP: Hudson Soft/Konami	NA: TG16; PAL: TG16; JP: PCE	November 21, 2006	2006-12-08	2007-07-06	December 2, 2006
Dungeon Explorer	NA: Hudson Soft; PAL: Hudson Soft; JP: Hudson Soft/Konami	NA: TG16; PAL: TG16; JP: PCE	January 8, 2007	2006-12-08	2007-07-06	December 2, 2006
Jaseiken Necromancer	Hudson Soft/Konami	PCE	Unreleased	Unreleased	Unreleased	December 2, 2006
NA: New Adventure Island; PAL: New Adventure Island; JP: Takahashi Meijin no Shin Bōken Jima	NA: Hudson Soft; PAL: Hudson Soft; JP: Hudson Soft/Konami	NA: TG16; PAL: TG16; JP: PCE	February 19, 2007	2007-02-16	2007-07-13	December 2, 2006
Super Star Soldier	NA: Hudson Soft; PAL: Hudson Soft; JP: Hudson Soft/Konami	NA: TG16; PAL: TG16; JP: PCE	November 27, 2006	2006-12-08	2007-07-06	December 2, 2006
Victory Run	NA: Hudson Soft; PAL: Hudson Soft; JP: Hudson Soft/Konami	NA: TG16; PAL: TG16; JP: PCE	December 4, 2006	2006-12-08	2007-07-06	December 2, 2006
Bomberman '93	Hudson Soft	TG16	November 21, 2006	2006-12-08	2007-07-06	Unreleased
R-Type Part I (not available from 2012-03-30 to 2013-09-17)	Hudson Soft/Konami	PCE	Unreleased	Unreleased	Unreleased	December 13, 2006
Alien Crush	NA: Hudson Soft; PAL: Hudson Soft; JP: Hudson Soft/Konami	NA: TG16; PAL: TG16; JP: PCE	December 11, 2006	2006-12-15	2007-07-06	January 9, 2007
NA: Military Madness; PAL: Military Madness; JP: Nectaris	NA: Hudson Soft; PAL: Hudson Soft; JP: Hudson Soft/Konami	NA: TG16; PAL: TG16; JP: PCE	December 18, 2006	2006-12-22	2007-07-06	December 20, 2006
NA: R-Type (not available from March 30, 2012, to September 19, 2013); PAL: R-Type (not available from 2012-03–31 to 2013-09-19)	NA: Hudson Soft, Irem; PAL: Irem	TG16	December 25, 2006	2006-12-29	2007-07-06	Unreleased
NA: Moto Roader; PAL: Motoroader; JP: Moto Roader	NA: Hudson Soft; PAL: Hudson Soft; JP: Hudson Soft/Konami	NA: TG16; PAL: TG16; JP: PCE	January 15, 2007	2007-01-05	2007-07-06	January 16, 2007
R-Type Part II (not available from 2012-03-30 to 2013-09-17)	Hudson Soft/Konami	PCE	Unreleased	Unreleased	Unreleased	January 23, 2007
Soldier Blade	NA: Hudson Soft; PAL: Hudson Soft; JP: Hudson Soft/Konami	NA: TG16; PAL: TG16; JP: PCE	January 8, 2007	2007-01-26	2007-07-06	January 30, 2007
NA: Vigilante (not available from March 30, 2012, to September 19, 2013); PAL: Vigilante (not available from 2012-03–31 to 2013-09-19); JP: Vigilante (not available from 2012-03-30 to 2013-09-17)	NA: Hudson Soft, Irem; PAL: Irem; JP: Irem	NA: TG16; PAL: TG16; JP: PCE	February 5, 2007	2007-02-09	2007-07-06	February 6, 2007
NA: Chew Man Fu; PAL: Chew Man Fu; JP: Be Ball	NA: Hudson Soft; PAL: Hudson Soft; JP: Hudson Soft/Konami	NA: TG16; PAL: TG16; JP: PCE	February 26, 2007	2007-03-02	2007-07-13	February 13, 2007
Yokai Dochuki	Bandai Namco Games	PCE	Unreleased	Unreleased	Unreleased	February 20, 2007
Wonder Momo	Bandai Namco Games	PCE	Unreleased	Unreleased	Unreleased	February 27, 2007
Double Dungeons	NA: Hudson Soft; PAL: Hudson Soft; JP: Hudson Soft/Konami	NA: TG16; PAL: TG16; JP: PCE	March 12, 2007	2007-03-09	2007-07-13	March 6, 2007
Fire Pro Wrestling Combination Tag	Spike	PCE	Unreleased	Unreleased	Unreleased	March 13, 2007
Splatterhouse	NA: Hudson Soft, Bandai Namco; PAL: Bandai Namco Entertainment; JP: Bandai Namco Games	NA: TG16; PAL: TG16; JP: PCE	March 19, 2007	2007-03-16	2007-07-20	July 3, 2007
Galaga '88	Bandai Namco Games	PCE	Unreleased	Unreleased	Unreleased	March 20, 2007
Kaizou Chounin Shubibinman	Hudson Soft/Konami	PCE	Unreleased	Unreleased	Unreleased	March 27, 2007
NA: Dragon's Curse; PAL: Dragon's Curse; JP: Adventure Island	NA: Hudson Soft; PAL: Sega; JP: Hudson Soft/Konami	NA: TG16; PAL: TG16; JP: PCE	April 2, 2007	2007-03-30	2007-07-20	August 7, 2007
NA: Final Soldier; PAL: Final Soldier (700 Nintendo Points); JP: Final Soldier	NA: Hudson Soft; PAL: Hudson Soft; JP: Hudson Soft/Konami	NA: TG16; PAL: TG16; JP: PCE	September 8, 2008	2008-05-02	2008-05-02	April 3, 2007
NA: Bloody Wolf (delisted on March 1, 2012)^{[8]} PAL: ~~Bloody Wolf~~ (delisted on 2012-03-14); JP: ~~Narazumono Sentou Butai: Bloody Wolf~~ (delisted on March 6, 2012)	NA: G-Mode; PAL: G-mode; JP: G-Mode	NA: TG16; PAL: TG16; JP: PCE	June 18, 2007	2007-06-29	2007-08-07	April 10, 2007
NA: Bonk's Revenge; PAL: Bonk's Revenge; JP: PC Genjin 2	NA: Hudson Soft; PAL: Hudson Soft; JP: Hudson Soft/Konami	NA: TG16; PAL: TG16; JP: PCE	April 16, 2007	2007-04-13	2007-07-27	April 10, 2007
Benkei Gaiden	Sunsoft	PCE	Unreleased	Unreleased	Unreleased	April 17, 2007
NA: Shockman; PAL: Shockman; JP: Kaizou Choujin Shubibinman 2: Aratanaru Teki	NA: Hudson Soft; PAL: Hudson Soft; JP: Hudson Soft/Konami	NA: TG16; PAL: TG16; JP: PCE	April 30, 2007	2007-05-04	2007-07-27	April 17, 2007
Battle Lode Runner	NA: Hudson Soft; PAL: Hudson Soft; JP: Hudson Soft/Konami	NA: TG16; PAL: TG16; JP: PCE	April 23, 2007	2007-04-27	2007-07-27	May 29, 2007
Neutopia	NA: Hudson Soft; PAL: Hudson Soft; JP: Hudson Soft/Konami	NA: TG16; PAL: TG16; JP: PCE	August 20, 2007	2007-08-24	2007-08-24	May 1, 2007
NA: Ninja Spirit (not available from March 30, 2012, to September 19, 2013); PAL: Ninja Spirit (not available from 2012-03–31 to 2013-09-19); JP: Saigo no Nindou: Ninja Spirit (not available from 2012-03-30 to 2013-09-17)	Irem	NA: TG16; PAL: TG16; JP: PCE	May 14, 2007	2007-05-11	2007-08-03	May 8, 2007
Out Live	Sunsoft	PCE	Unreleased	Unreleased	Unreleased	May 15, 2007
Sengoku Mahjong	Hudson Soft/Konami	PCE	Unreleased	Unreleased	Unreleased	May 15, 2007
NA: Air Zonk; PAL: Air 'Zonk'; JP: PC Denjin: Punkic Cyborgs	NA: Hudson Soft; PAL: Hudson Soft; JP: Hudson Soft/Konami	NA: TG16; PAL: TG16; JP: PCE	July 9, 2007	2007-07-13	2007-08-07	May 22, 2007
NA: Bravoman; JP: Chōzetsurin Jin: Bravoman	NA: Hudson Soft, Bandai Namco; JP: Bandai Namco Games	NA: TG16; JP: PCE	April 9, 2007	Unreleased	Unreleased	May 22, 2007
NA: Blazing Lazers; PAL: Blazing Lazers; JP: Blazing Lazers (Note: Reskinned version of Gunhed.)	NA: Hudson Soft; PAL: Hudson Soft; JP: Hudson Soft/Konami	NA: TG16; PAL: TG16; JP: PCE	May 21, 2007	2007-05-25	2007-08-03	June 17, 2008
NA: World Sports Competition; PAL: World Sports Competition; JP: Power Sports	NA: Hudson Soft; PAL: Hudson Soft; JP: Hudson Soft/Konami	NA: TG16; PAL: TG16; JP: PCE	June 18, 2007	2007-06-01	2007-08-03	July 17, 2007
NA: China Warrior; PAL: China Warrior; JP: The Kung Fu	NA: Hudson Soft; PAL: Hudson Soft; JP: Hudson Soft/Konami	NA: TG16; PAL: TG16; JP: PCE	June 25, 2007	2007-06-22	2007-08-07	June 5, 2007
NA: Dead Moon; PAL: Dead Moon; JP: Dead Moon: Tsuki Sekai no Akumu	Natsume Inc.	NA: TG16; PAL: TG16; JP: PCE	June 4, 2007	2007-06-08	2007-08-03	July 17, 2007
Neutopia II	NA: Hudson Soft; PAL: Hudson Soft; JP: Hudson Soft/Konami	NA: TG16; PAL: TG16; JP: PCE	September 10, 2007	2007-09-14	2007-09-14	June 12, 2007
J.J. & Jeff	Hudson Soft	TG16	May 28, 2007	2007-06-15	2007-08-03	Unreleased
NA: Bonk 3: Bonk's Big Adventure; PAL: Bonk 3: Bonk's Big Adventure; JP: PC Genjin 3	NA: Hudson Soft; PAL: Hudson Soft; JP: Hudson Soft/Konami	NA: TG16; PAL: TG16; JP: PCE	September 3, 2007	2007-08-31	2007-08-31	June 19, 2007
NA: Devil's Crush; PAL: Devil's Crush; JP: Devil Crash	NA: Hudson Soft; PAL: Hudson Soft; JP: Hudson Soft/Konami	NA: TG16; PAL: TG16; JP: PCE	July 23, 2007	2007-07-27	2007-08-10	June 19, 2007
NA: Silent Debuggers (delisted on March 1, 2012)^{[8]} PAL: ~~Silent Debuggers~~ (delisted on 2012-03-14); JP: ~~The Silent Debuggers~~ (delisted on March 6, 2012)	NA: Hudson Soft, G-Mode; PAL: G-mode; JP: G-Mode	NA: TG16; PAL: TG16; JP: PCE	July 16, 2007	2007-07-20	2007-07-20	June 26, 2007
Dragon Spirit	NA: Bandai Namco; PAL: Bandai Namco Entertainment; JP: Bandai Namco Games	NA: TG16; PAL: TG16; JP: PCE	July 2, 2007	2007-07-06	2007-08-07	November 13, 2007
~~Makai Hakkenden Shada~~ (delisted on March 6, 2012)	G-Mode	PCE	Unreleased	Unreleased	Unreleased	July 10, 2007
Appare! Gate Ball	Hudson Soft/Konami	PCE	Unreleased	Unreleased	Unreleased	July 24, 2007
Power League 4	Hudson Soft/Konami	PCE	Unreleased	Unreleased	Unreleased	July 31, 2007
NA: Drop Off (delisted on March 1, 2012)^{[8]} PAL: ~~Drop Off~~ (delisted on 2012-03-14); JP: ~~Drop Rock Hora Hora~~ (delisted on March 6, 2012)	NA: G-Mode; PAL: G-mode; JP: G-Mode	NA: TG16; PAL: TG16; JP: PCE	July 30, 2007	2007-08-03	2007-08-17	August 28, 2007
Gradius	Konami	PCE	Unreleased	Unreleased	Unreleased	August 7, 2007
Image Fight (not available from 2012-03-30 to 2013-09-17)	Irem	PCE	Unreleased	Unreleased	Unreleased	August 7, 2007
Galaga '90	NA: Bandai Namco; PAL: Bandai Namco Entertainment	TG16	August 6, 2007	2007-08-10	2007-08-17	Unreleased
Cratermaze	Hudson Soft	TG16	August 13, 2007	2007-08-17	2007-08-17	Unreleased
Ordyne	NA: Bandai Namco; JP: Bandai Namco Games	NA: TG16; JP: PCE	May 7, 2007	Unreleased	Unreleased	August 21, 2007
NA: Legend of Hero Tonma (not available from March 30, 2012, to September 19, 2013); PAL: Legend of Hero Tonma (not available from 2012-03–31 to 2013-09-19); JP: Legend of Hero Tonma (not available from 2012-03-30 to 2013-09-17)	Irem	NA: TG16; PAL: TG16; JP: PCE	September 24, 2007	2007-09-28	2007-09-28	September 4, 2007
~~Override~~ (delisted on March 6, 2012)	G-Mode	PCE	Unreleased	Unreleased	Unreleased	September 4, 2007
Gai Flame	Hudson Soft	PCE	Unreleased	Unreleased	Unreleased	September 11, 2007
Salamander	Konami	PCE	Unreleased	Unreleased	Unreleased	September 11, 2007
NA: Detana!! TwinBee; PAL: Detana!! TwinBee (700 Nintendo Points); JP: Detana!! TwinBee	Konami	NA: TG16; PAL: TG16; JP: PCE	March 23, 2009	2009-07-24	2009-07-24	September 18, 2007
World Class Baseball	Hudson Soft	TG16	September 17, 2007	2007-09-21	2007-09-21	Unreleased
Genpei Tōma Den	Bandai Namco Games	PCE	Unreleased	Unreleased	Unreleased	October 2, 2007
Power Golf	NA: Hudson Soft; PAL: Hudson Soft; JP: Hudson Soft/Konami	NA: TG16; PAL: TG16; JP: PCE	November 5, 2007	2007-11-09	2007-11-09	October 9, 2007
NA: Ys Book I & II; PAL: Ys Book I & II (800 Nintendo Points); JP: Ys I・II	NA: Nihon Falcom; PAL: Nihon Falcom; JP: Nihon Falcom, Konami	NA: TGCD; PAL: TGCD; JP: PCE-CD	August 25, 2008	2008-09-05	2008-09-05	October 16, 2007
NA: Gate of Thunder; PAL: Gate of Thunder (800 Nintendo Points); JP: Gate of Thunder	NA: Hudson Soft; PAL: Hudson Soft; JP: Hudson Soft/Konami	NA: TGCD; PAL: TGCD; JP: PCE-SCD	October 15, 2007	2007-10-19	2007-10-19	December 4, 2007
NA: Cho Aniki; PAL: Cho Aniki (900 Nintendo Points); JP: Cho Aniki	NA: Hudson Soft; PAL: Hudson Soft; JP: Hudson Soft/Konami	NA: TGCD; PAL: TGCD; JP: PCE-SCD	September 8, 2008	2008-05-09	2008-05-09	October 23, 2007
NA: Super Air Zonk: Rockabilly-Paradise; PAL: Super Air Zonk (800 Nintendo Points); JP: CD Denjin: Rockabilly Tengoku	NA: Hudson Soft; PAL: Hudson Soft; JP: Hudson Soft/Konami	NA: TGCD; PAL: TGCD; JP: PCE-SCD	November 19, 2007	2007-10-26	2007-10-26	January 29, 2008
NA: Samurai Ghost; PAL: Samurai Ghost; JP: Genpei Tōma Den: Kannoni	NA: Bandai Namco; PAL: Bandai Namco Entertainment; JP: Bandai Namco Games	NA: TG16; PAL: TG16; JP: PCE	October 29, 2007	2007-11-02	2007-11-02	January 8, 2008
NA: The Dynastic Hero; JP: Chou Eiyū Densetsu: The Dynastic Hero	NA: Hudson Soft; JP: Hudson Soft/Konami	NA: TGCD; JP: PCE-SCD	December 3, 2007	Unreleased	Unreleased	November 6, 2007
NA: Gradius II: Gofer no Yabou; PAL: Gradius II: Gofer no Yabou (900 Nintendo Points); JP: Gradius II: Gofer no Yabou	Konami	NA: TGCD; PAL: TGCD; JP: PCE-SCD	October 20, 2008	2008-05-02	2008-05-02	November 13, 2007
A Ressha de Ikou III	Artdink	PCE-SCD	Unreleased	Unreleased	Unreleased	November 20, 2007
Kawa no Nushi Tsuri Shizenha	Marvelous Entertainment	PCE-CD	Unreleased	Unreleased	Unreleased	November 27, 2007
The Dynastic Hero (800 Nintendo Points)	Sega	TGCD	Unreleased	2007-11-30	2007-11-30	Unreleased
Image Fight II (not available from 2012-03-30 to 2013-09-17)	Irem, Konami	PCE-SCD	Unreleased	Unreleased	Unreleased	December 11, 2007
Ai Cho Aniki	Hudson Soft	PCE-SCD	Unreleased	Unreleased	Unreleased	December 18, 2007
NA: Monster Lair; PAL: Monster Lair (800 Nintendo Points); JP: Monster Lair	NA: Hudson Soft; PAL: Sega; JP: Hudson Soft/Konami	NA: TGCD; PAL: TGCD; JP: PCE-CD	December 17, 2007	2007-12-21	2007-12-21	April 15, 2008
Dragon Slayer: Eiyū Densetsu	Nihon Falcom	PCE-SCD	Unreleased	Unreleased	Unreleased	December 25, 2007
NA: Riot Zone; PAL: Riot Zone (800 Nintendo Points); JP: Crest of Wolf	NA: Hudson Soft; PAL: Hudson Soft; JP: Hudson Soft/Konami	NA: TGCD; PAL: TGCD; JP: PCE-SCD	January 14, 2008	2008-01-18	2008-01-18	April 1, 2008
Dungeon Explorer II	Hudson Soft/Konami	PCE-SCD	Unreleased	Unreleased	Unreleased	February 5, 2008
NA: Lords of Thunder; PAL: Lords of Thunder (800 Nintendo Points); JP: Winds of Thunder	NA: Hudson Soft; PAL: Hudson Soft; JP: Hudson Soft/Konami	NA: TGCD; PAL: TGCD; JP: PCE-SCD	February 11, 2008	2008-02-08	2008-02-08	June 10, 2008
The Atlas: Renaissance Voyager	Artdink	PCE-SCD	Unreleased	Unreleased	Unreleased	February 19, 2008
Neo Nectaris	Hudson Soft/Konami	PCE-SCD	Unreleased	Unreleased	Unreleased	February 26, 2008
Power Eleven	Hudson Soft/Konami	PCE	Unreleased	Unreleased	Unreleased	February 26, 2008
NA: Psychosis; PAL: Psychosis; JP: Paranoia	Naxat Soft	NA: TG16; PAL: TG16; JP: PCE	February 25, 2008	2008-02-29	2008-02-29	June 24, 2008
Psycho Chaser	Naxat Soft	PCE	Unreleased	Unreleased	Unreleased	March 11, 2008
Bomberman: Panic Bomber	Hudson Soft/Konami	PCE-SCD	Unreleased	Unreleased	Unreleased	March 18, 2008
Mr. Heli no Daibōken (not available from 2012-03-30 to 2013-09-17)	Irem, Konami	PCE	Unreleased	Unreleased	Unreleased	March 18, 2008
Valkyrie no Densetsu	Bandai Namco Games	PCE	Unreleased	Unreleased	Unreleased	April 1, 2008
NA: Digital Champ: Battle Boxing; PAL: Digital Champ: Battle Boxing (700 Nintendo Points); JP: Digital Champ: Battle Boxing	Naxat Soft	NA: TG16; PAL: TG16; JP: PCE	October 20, 2008	2008-05-16	2008-05-16	April 15, 2008
NA: Castlevania: Rondo of Blood; PAL: Castlevania: Rondo of Blood (900 Nintendo Points); JP: Akumajō Dracula X: Chi no Rondo	Konami	NA: TGCD; PAL: TGCD; JP: PCE-SCD	March 15, 2010	2010-03-19	2010-03-19	April 22, 2008
NA: Star Parodier (delisted in March 2014); PAL: Star Parodier (900 Nintendo Points); JP: Star Parodier	NA: Hudson Soft; PAL: Hudson Soft; JP: Hudson Soft/Konami	NA: TGCD; PAL: TGCD; JP: PCE-SCD	August 11, 2008	2008-05-16	2008-05-16	May 7, 2008
NA: Break In; PAL: Break In (700 Nintendo Points); JP: Break In	Naxat Soft	NA: TG16; PAL: TG16; JP: PCE	August 11, 2008	2008-05-09	2008-05-09	May 20, 2008
Martial Champion	Konami	PCE-SCD	Unreleased	Unreleased	Unreleased	May 13, 2008
Fire Pro Wrestling 2nd Bout	Spike	PCE	Unreleased	Unreleased	Unreleased	May 27, 2008
Power Tennis	Hudson Soft/Konami	PCE	Unreleased	Unreleased	Unreleased	June 3, 2008
Seirei Senshi Spriggan	Naxat Soft	PCE-CD	Unreleased	Unreleased	Unreleased	July 1, 2008
KiKi KaiKai	Taito	PCE	Unreleased	Unreleased	Unreleased	July 8, 2008
Darius Plus	Taito	PCE SGFX	Unreleased	Unreleased	Unreleased	July 15, 2008
Blood Gear	Hudson Soft/Konami	PCE-SCD	Unreleased	Unreleased	Unreleased	July 29, 2008
Dragon Saber	Bandai Namco Games	PCE	Unreleased	Unreleased	Unreleased	August 5, 2008
Eikan wa Kimi ni: Kōkō Yakyū Zenkoku Taikai	Artdink	PCE-SCD	Unreleased	Unreleased	Unreleased	August 5, 2008
Parasol Stars	Taito	PCE	Unreleased	Unreleased	Unreleased	August 19, 2008
NA: Chase H.Q. PAL: Chase H.Q. JP: TAITO Chase H.Q.	Taito	NA: TG16; PAL: TG16; JP: PCE	July 28, 2008	2008-09-05	2008-09-05	August 26, 2008
Final Blaster	Bandai Namco Games	PCE	Unreleased	Unreleased	Unreleased	September 9, 2008
Mizubaku Daibōken Adventure	Taito	PCE	Unreleased	Unreleased	Unreleased	September 16, 2008
The Ninja Warriors	Taito	PCE	Unreleased	Unreleased	Unreleased	September 24, 2008
Nekketsu Kōkō Dodgeball Bu: PC Bangai Hen	Naxat Soft	PCE	Unreleased	Unreleased	Unreleased	September 30, 2008
Super Darius	Taito	PCE-CD	Unreleased	Unreleased	Unreleased	October 7, 2008
The NewZealand Story	Taito	PCE	Unreleased	Unreleased	Unreleased	October 14, 2008
Nekketsu Kōkō Dodgeball Bu: CD Soccer Hen	Naxat Soft	PCE-SCD	Unreleased	Unreleased	Unreleased	November 4, 2008
Cadash	Taito	PCE	Unreleased	Unreleased	Unreleased	November 11, 2008
Volfied	Taito	PCE	Unreleased	Unreleased	Unreleased	November 18, 2008
Kaze no Densetsu Xanadu	Nihon Falcom	PCE-SCD	Unreleased	Unreleased	Unreleased	November 25, 2008
Space Invaders: Fukkatsu no Hi	Taito	PCE	Unreleased	Unreleased	Unreleased	December 2, 2008
S.C.I.	Taito	PCE	Unreleased	Unreleased	Unreleased	December 9, 2008
Jigoku Meguri	Taito	PCE	Unreleased	Unreleased	Unreleased	December 16, 2008
Fire Pro Wrestling 3: Legend Bout	Spike	PCE	Unreleased	Unreleased	Unreleased	December 24, 2008
Rastan Saga 2	Taito	PCE	Unreleased	Unreleased	Unreleased	January 6, 2009
Spriggan mark 2: Re-Terraform Project	Naxat Soft	PCE-SCD	Unreleased	Unreleased	Unreleased	January 13, 2009
Champion Wrestler	Taito	PCE	Unreleased	Unreleased	Unreleased	January 20, 2009
Kaze no Densetsu Xanadu II	Nihon Falcom	PCE-SCD	Unreleased	Unreleased	Unreleased	January 27, 2009
Dai Makaimura	Capcom	PCE SGFX	Unreleased	Unreleased	Unreleased	February 3, 2009
L-Dis	Hudson Soft/Konami	PCE-CD	Unreleased	Unreleased	Unreleased	February 3, 2009
~~Winning Shot~~ (delisted on March 6, 2012)	G-Mode	PCE	Unreleased	Unreleased	Unreleased	February 10, 2009
Super Darius II	Taito	PCE-SCD	Unreleased	Unreleased	Unreleased	February 17, 2009
Wallaby!! Usagi no Kuni no Kangaroo Race	Hudson Soft/Konami	PCE	Unreleased	Unreleased	Unreleased	February 24, 2009
Space Invaders: The Original Game	Taito	PCE-SCD	Unreleased	Unreleased	Unreleased	March 3, 2009
Ninja Gaiden	Tecmo	PCE	Unreleased	Unreleased	Unreleased	April 21, 2009
NA: SimEarth: The Living Planet (delisted in July 2017); PAL: ~~SimEarth: The Living Planet~~ (delisted in July 2017) (800 Nintendo Points); JP: SimEarth: The Living Planet	NA: Hudson Soft; PAL: Maxis; JP: Hudson Soft	NA: TGCD; PAL: TGCD; JP: PCE-SCD	June 22, 2009	2009-06-26	2009-06-26	May 12, 2009
NA: Fighting Street; PAL: Fighting Street (800 Nintendo Points); JP: Fighting Street	Capcom	NA: TGCD; PAL: TGCD; JP: PCE-CD	November 2, 2009	2009-11-06	2009-11-06	October 6, 2009
NA: Street Fighter II: Champion Edition; PAL: Street Fighter II': Champion Edition (700 Nintendo Points); JP: Street Fighter II Dash: Champion Edition	Capcom	NA: TG16; PAL: TG16; JP: PCE	November 16, 2009	2009-12-18	2009-12-18	November 10, 2009

=== Master System ===
Title	Publisher(s)	North America release date	Europe release date	Australia release date	Japan release date
Hokuto no Ken	Sega	Unreleased	Unreleased	Unreleased	February 26, 2008
Fantasy Zone	Sega	April 14, 2008	2008-04-11	2008-04-11	March 11, 2008
NA: Wonder Boy; PAL: Wonder Boy; JP: Super Wonder Boy	Sega	March 31, 2008	2008-04-11	2008-04-11	April 8, 2008
NA: Alex Kidd in Miracle World; PAL: Alex Kidd in Miracle World; JP: Alex Kidd no Miracle World	Sega	June 23, 2008	2008-06-13	2008-06-13	May 13, 2008
NA: Secret Command; PAL: Secret Command; JP: Ashura	Sega	July 13, 2009	2009-04-17	2009-04-17	June 3, 2008
Space Harrier	Sega	November 3, 2008	2008-10-17	2008-10-17	July 23, 2008
NA: Sonic the Hedgehog; PAL: Sonic the Hedgehog; JP: Sonic the Hedgehog (Note: Originally unreleased in Japan.) (not available from March 30, 2012, to October 15, 2013)	Sega	August 4, 2008	2008-09-19	2008-09-19	August 5, 2008
Enduro Racer	Sega	December 15, 2008	2009-01-09	2009-01-09	October 21, 2008
NA: Sonic the Hedgehog 2 PAL: Sonic the Hedgehog 2 JP: Sonic the Hedgehog 2	Sega	December 8, 2008	2008-12-26	2008-12-26	November 18, 2008
NA: Wonder Boy in Monster Land; PAL: Wonder Boy in Monster Land; JP: Super Wonder Boy: Monster World	Sega	January 26, 2009	2009-01-23	2009-01-23	December 24, 2008
NA: Fantasy Zone II: The Tears of Opa-Opa; PAL: Fantasy Zone II; JP: Fantasy Zone II: Opa-Opa no Namida	Sega	June 29, 2009	2009-05-08	2009-05-08	January 13, 2009
NA: Sonic Chaos; PAL: Sonic Chaos; JP: Sonic Chaos (Sonic & Tails)	Sega	February 2, 2009	2009-02-06	2009-02-06	March 17, 2009
Alex Kidd: The Lost Stars	Sega	March 9, 2009	2009-04-17	2009-04-17	February 17, 2009
Phantasy Star	Sega	August 31, 2009	2009-08-14	2009-08-14	April 21, 2009
NA: R-Type (delisted on September 30, 2011); PAL: ~~R-Type~~ (delisted on 2011-09-30); JP: ~~R-Type~~ (delisted on October 18, 2011)	NA: Irem; PAL: Sega; JP: Sega	November 2, 2009	2009-09-25	2009-09-25	May 19, 2009
Wonder Boy III: The Dragon's Trap	Sega	November 9, 2009	2009-10-09	2009-10-09	Unreleased
Alex Kidd in Shinobi World	Sega	February 1, 2010	2009-12-11	2009-12-11	Unreleased

=== Genesis / Mega Drive ===
Title	Publisher(s)	North America release date	Europe release date	Australia release date	Japan release date
NA: Altered Beast; PAL: Altered Beast; JP: Jūōki	Sega	November 19, 2006	2006-12-08	2006-12-07	December 2, 2006
NA: Sonic the Hedgehog; PAL: Sonic the Hedgehog; JP: ~~Sonic the Hedgehog~~ (not available from March 30, 2012, to October 15, 2013; delisted again on October 30, 2015)	Sega	November 19, 2006	2006-12-08	2006-12-07	December 2, 2006
NA: Ecco the Dolphin; PAL: Ecco the Dolphin; JP: Ecco the Dolphin	Sega	November 28, 2006	2006-12-08	2006-12-07	December 2, 2006
Golden Axe	Sega	November 28, 2006	2006-12-08	2006-12-07	December 2, 2006
Columns	Sega	December 4, 2006	2006-12-15	2006-12-15	December 2, 2006
Gunstar Heroes	Sega	December 11, 2006	2006-12-15	2006-12-15	December 2, 2006
Puyo Puyo	Sega	Unreleased	Unreleased	Unreleased	December 2, 2006
NA: Ristar; PAL: Ristar; JP: Ristar the Shooting Star	Sega	December 4, 2006	2006-12-15	2006-12-15	December 2, 2006
Shadow Dancer: The Secret of Shinobi	Sega	January 18, 2010	2010-01-08	2010-01-08	December 2, 2006
Space Harrier II	Sega	December 18, 2006	2006-12-22	2006-12-22	December 2, 2006
ToeJam & Earl	Sega	December 25, 2006	2006-12-22	2006-12-22	December 2, 2006
Dr. Robotnik's Mean Bean Machine	Sega	December 11, 2006	2006-12-15	2006-12-15	Unreleased
Bonanza Bros.	Sega	January 29, 2007	2007-02-02	2007-02-02	January 30, 2007
Comix Zone	Sega	January 29, 2007	2007-02-02	2007-02-02	January 30, 2007
NA: Bio-Hazard Battle; PAL: Bio-Hazard Battle; JP: Crying	Sega	February 26, 2007	2007-03-02	2007-03-02	January 30, 2007
Gain Ground	Sega	February 5, 2007	2007-02-02	2007-02-02	January 30, 2007
Streets of Rage	Sega	February 19, 2007	Unreleased	Unreleased	Unreleased
NA: Beyond Oasis; PAL: The Story of Thor; JP: The Story of Thor: Hikari o Tsugu Mono	Sega	March 19, 2007	2007-04-05	2007-04-05	February 27, 2007
PAL: Streets of Rage; JP: Bare Knuckle: Ikari no Tekken	Sega	Unreleased	2007-03-02	2007-03-02	February 27, 2007
NA: Sword of Vermilion; PAL: Sword of Vermilion; JP: Vermilion	Sega	March 5, 2007	2007-03-02	2007-03-02	February 27, 2007
NA: Vectorman; PAL: Vectorman; JP: Vectorman (Note: Originally unreleased in Japan.)	Sega	September 22, 2008	2007-04-05	2007-04-05	February 27, 2007
Puzzle & Action: Tanto-R	Sega	Unreleased	Unreleased	Unreleased	March 6, 2007
NA: Sonic Spinball; PAL: Sonic Spinball; JP: Sonic Spinball	Sega	March 12, 2007	2007-04-05	2007-04-05	March 13, 2007
NA: Alex Kidd in the Enchanted Castle; PAL: Alex Kidd in the Enchanted Castle; JP: Alex Kidd: Tenkū Majou	Sega	April 9, 2007	2007-05-04	2007-05-04	March 20, 2007
NA: Virtua Fighter 2 PAL: Virtua Fighter 2 JP: Virtua Fighter 2	Sega	April 16, 2007	2007-05-04	2007-05-04	March 20, 2007
Alien Storm	Sega	December 17, 2007	2008-01-11	2008-01-11	March 27, 2007
Dyna Brothers	Sega	Unreleased	Unreleased	Unreleased	March 27, 2007
NA: Wonder Boy in Monster World; PAL: Wonder Boy in Monster World; JP: Wonder Boy V: Monster World III	Sega	April 23, 2007	2007-05-04	2007-05-04	March 27, 2007
Rent-A-Hero	Sega	Unreleased	Unreleased	Unreleased	April 17, 2007
Bahamut Senki	Sega	Unreleased	Unreleased	Unreleased	April 24, 2007
NA: Pulseman; PAL: Pulseman (900 Nintendo Points); JP: Pulseman	NA: Game Freak; PAL: Game Freak; JP: Sega	July 13, 2009	2009-07-03	2009-07-03	April 24, 2007
NA: Puyo Puyo 2 PAL: Puyo Puyo 2 (900 Nintendo Points); JP: Puyo Puyo 2	Sega	March 10, 2008	2008-05-09	2008-05-09	April 24, 2007
NA: Streets of Rage 2 PAL: Streets of Rage 2 JP: Bare Knuckle II: Shitou he no Chinkonka	Sega	May 21, 2007	2007-06-01	2007-06-01	May 15, 2007
NA: Kid Chameleon; PAL: Kid Chameleon; JP: Chameleon Kid	Sega	May 28, 2007	2007-06-01	2007-06-01	May 22, 2007
The Hybrid Front	Sega	Unreleased	Unreleased	Unreleased	May 29, 2007
ToeJam & Earl in Panic on Funkotron	Sega	June 4, 2007	2007-06-01	2007-06-01	Unreleased
Golden Axe II	Sega	June 11, 2007	2007-07-06	2007-07-06	June 5, 2007
NA: Sonic the Hedgehog 2 PAL: Sonic the Hedgehog 2 JP: ~~Sonic the Hedgehog 2~~ (not available from March 30, 2012, to October 15, 2013; delisted again on October 30, 2015)	Sega	June 11, 2007	2007-07-06	2007-07-06	June 19, 2007
NA: Shining in the Darkness; PAL: Shining in the Darkness; JP: Shining and the Darkness	Sega	August 13, 2007	2007-09-07	2007-09-07	June 12, 2007
NA: Ecco: The Tides of Time; PAL: Ecco: The Tides of Time; JP: Ecco the Dolphin 2	Sega	July 2, 2007	2007-07-06	2007-07-06	June 26, 2007
NA: Shinobi III: Return of the Ninja Master; PAL: Shinobi III: Return of the Ninja Master; JP: The Super Shinobi II	Sega	August 20, 2007	2007-08-03	2007-08-03	July 3, 2007
NA: Shining Force; PAL: Shining Force; JP: Shining Force: Kamigami no Isan	Sega	July 23, 2007	2007-08-03	2007-08-03	July 10, 2007
Ichi Tanto-R	Sega	Unreleased	Unreleased	Unreleased	July 17, 2007
Dynamite Headdy	Sega	July 30, 2007	2007-08-03	2007-08-03	July 24, 2007
NA: Ghouls 'n Ghosts; PAL: Ghouls 'n Ghosts; JP: Dai Makaimura	Capcom	August 27, 2007	2007-09-07	2007-09-07	July 31, 2007
Crack Down	Sega	Unreleased	2007-09-07	2007-09-07	August 7, 2007
Sonic the Hedgehog 3	Sega	September 10, 2007	2007-09-07	2007-09-07	August 21, 2007
PAL: ESWAT: City Under Siege; JP: ESWAT: Cyber Police	Sega	Unreleased	2007-09-07	2007-09-07	August 28, 2007
NA: Landstalker: The Treasures of King Nole; PAL: Landstalker: The Treasures of King Nole; JP: Landstalker: Koutei no Zaihou	Sega	September 3, 2007	2007-10-05	2007-10-05	September 25, 2007
Golden Axe III	Sega	October 22, 2007	2007-10-05	2007-10-05	September 4, 2007
Chelnov	Paon	Unreleased	Unreleased	Unreleased	September 11, 2007
Super Thunder Blade	Sega	September 17, 2007	2007-10-05	2007-10-05	September 18, 2007
NA: Streets of Rage 3 PAL: Streets of Rage 3 JP: Bare Knuckle III: Tekken Seiten	Sega	September 24, 2007	2007-10-05	2007-10-05	October 2, 2007
Alien Soldier	Sega	November 5, 2007	2007-11-02	2007-11-02	October 9, 2007
NA: Sonic 3D Blast; PAL: Sonic 3D: Flickies' Island; JP: Sonic 3D Blast	Sega	November 19, 2007	2007-11-02	2007-11-02	October 16, 2007
Dyna Brothers 2 Special	Sega	Unreleased	Unreleased	Unreleased	October 23, 2007
Jūsō Kihei Leynos	Nippon Computer Systems	Unreleased	Unreleased	Unreleased	October 30, 2007
NA: Ecco Jr. PAL: Ecco Jr. JP: Ecco Jr.	Sega	November 26, 2007	2008-08-08	2008-08-08	November 6, 2007
Light Crusader	Sega	December 31, 2007	2007-12-07	2007-12-07	November 13, 2007
Eternal Champions	Sega	December 3, 2007	2008-02-15	2008-02-15	November 20, 2007
Langrisser	Nippon Computer Systems	Unreleased	Unreleased	Unreleased	November 27, 2007
Rolling Thunder 2	NA: Bandai Namco; PAL: Sega; JP: Bandai Namco Games	December 24, 2007	2007-12-07	2007-12-07	December 4, 2007
NA: Columns III: Revenge of Columns; PAL: Columns III: Revenge of Columns (900 Nintendo Points); JP: Columns III: Taiketsu! Columns World	Sega	February 4, 2008	2008-05-02	2008-05-02	December 11, 2007
Party Quiz Mega Q	Sega	Unreleased	Unreleased	Unreleased	December 18, 2007
Langrisser II	Nippon Computer Systems	Unreleased	Unreleased	Unreleased	December 25, 2007
NA: Monster World IV; PAL: Monster World IV (900 Nintendo Points); JP: Monster World IV	Sega	May 10, 2012	2012-05-10	2012-05-10	January 15, 2008
NA: Phantasy Star II; PAL: Phantasy Star II; JP: Phantasy Star II: Kaerazaru Toki no Owari ni	Sega	February 18, 2008	2008-02-15	2008-02-15	January 29, 2008
NA: Powerball; JP: Wrestleball	NA: Bandai Namco; JP: Bandai Namco Games	March 24, 2008	Unreleased	Unreleased	February 19, 2008
NA: Gley Lancer; PAL: Gley Lancer (900 Nintendo Points); JP: Gley Lancer	NA: NCS Corp; PAL: Nippon Computer Systems; JP: Nippon Computer Systems	July 21, 2008	2008-05-16	2008-05-16	February 26, 2008
Mega Turrican	NA: Factor 5 PAL: Sega	April 14, 2008	2008-03-21	2008-03-21	Unreleased
NA: M.U.S.H.A. PAL: M.U.S.H.A. (900 Nintendo Points); JP: Musha Aleste: Full Metal Fighter Ellinor	NA: Sega; PAL: Naxat Soft; JP: Naxat Soft	January 19, 2009	2009-07-17	2009-07-17	April 1, 2008
NA: Phantasy Star III: Generations of Doom; PAL: Phantasy Star III: Generations of Doom; JP: Toki no Keishousha: Phantasy Star III	Sega	April 21, 2008	2008-04-18	2008-04-18	April 30, 2008
Phelios	Bandai Namco Games	Unreleased	Unreleased	Unreleased	April 22, 2008
Super Fantasy Zone	Sunsoft	July 21, 2008	2008-06-27	2008-06-27	May 7, 2008
Gynoug	Nippon Computer Systems	Unreleased	Unreleased	Unreleased	May 20, 2008
NA: Phantasy Star IV: The End of the Millennium; PAL: Phantasy Star IV; JP: Phantasy Star: Sennenki no Owari ni	Sega	December 22, 2008	2008-11-14	2008-11-14	June 24, 2008
NA: Splatterhouse 2 PAL: Splatterhouse 2 JP: Splatterhouse Part 2	NA: Bandai Namco; PAL: Sega; JP: Bandai Namco Games	August 4, 2008	2008-08-08	2008-08-08	July 1, 2008
NA: Shining Force II: Ancient Sealing; PAL: Shining Force II; JP: Shining Force II: Inishie no Fūin	Sega	October 6, 2008	2008-10-03	2008-10-03	July 15, 2008
NA: Street Fighter II: Special Champion Edition; PAL: Street Fighter II': Special Champion Edition; JP: Street Fighter II Dash Plus: Champion Edition	Capcom	October 13, 2008	2008-10-17	2008-10-31	July 29, 2008
Lord Monarch: Tokoton Sentou Densetsu	Nihon Falcom	Unreleased	Unreleased	Unreleased	August 19, 2008
Hokuto no Ken: Shin Seikimatsu Kyūseishu Densetsu	Sega	Unreleased	Unreleased	Unreleased	September 9, 2008
Sorcerian	Nihon Falcom	Unreleased	Unreleased	Unreleased	September 16, 2008
Forgotten Worlds	Capcom	November 17, 2008	2008-11-28	2008-11-28	September 24, 2008
NA: Earthworm Jim; PAL: Earthworm Jim; JP: Earthworm Jim	NA: Interplay Entertainment; PAL: Interplay; JP: Interplay	October 27, 2008	2008-10-03	2008-10-03	December 16, 2008
NA: Mercs; PAL: Wolf of the Battlefield: MERCS; JP: Senjou no Ōkami II	Capcom	February 9, 2009	2009-02-20	2009-02-20	November 4, 2008
Boogerman: A Pick and Flick Adventure	NA: Interplay Entertainment; PAL: Interplay	November 24, 2008	2008-12-12	2008-12-12	Unreleased
Wonder Boy III: Monster Lair	Sega	April 20, 2009	2009-03-06	2009-03-06	January 6, 2009
Galaxy Force II	Sega	May 11, 2009	2009-05-01	2009-05-01	February 3, 2009
ClayFighter	NA: Interplay Entertainment; PAL: Interplay	May 25, 2009	2009-02-06	2009-02-06	Unreleased
Dragon Slayer: Eiyū Densetsu	Nihon Falcom	Unreleased	Unreleased	Unreleased	February 10, 2009
Dragon Slayer: Eiyū Densetsu II	Nihon Falcom	Unreleased	Unreleased	Unreleased	March 3, 2009
NA: The Revenge of Shinobi; PAL: The Revenge of Shinobi; JP: The Super Shinobi	Sega	August 17, 2009	2009-08-07	2009-08-07	March 10, 2009
NA: Pitfall: The Mayan Adventure (delisted on January 1, 2014); PAL: ~~Pitfall: The Mayan Adventure~~ (delisted on 2013-12-31); JP: ~~Pitfall: The Mayan Adventure~~ (delisted on December 26, 2013)	Activision	April 13, 2009	2009-05-15	2009-05-15	August 25, 2009
Pepen ga Pengo	Sega	Unreleased	Unreleased	Unreleased	August 4, 2009
NA: Earthworm Jim 2 PAL: Earthworm Jim 2 JP: Earthworm Jim 2	NA: Interplay Entertainment; PAL: Interplay; JP: Interplay	December 14, 2009	2009-12-04	2009-12-04	September 1, 2009
NA: Sonic & Knuckles; PAL: Sonic & Knuckles; JP: Sonic & Knuckles (not available from March 30, 2012, to October 15, 2013)	Sega	February 15, 2010	2010-02-12	2010-02-12	October 27, 2009
NA: Shanghai II: Dragon's Eye (delisted on January 1, 2014); PAL: ~~Shanghai II: Dragon's Eye~~ (delisted on 2013-12-31)	Activision	January 11, 2010	2009-11-27	2009-11-27	Unreleased
Super Street Fighter II: The New Challengers	Capcom	April 26, 2012	2012-04-12	2012-04-12	November 8, 2011
NA: Strider; PAL: Strider; JP: Strider Hiryū	Capcom	February 16, 2012	2012-03-15	2012-03-15	November 15, 2011

=== Neo Geo ===
Title	Publisher(s)	North America release date	Europe release date	Australia release date	Japan release date
NA: Fatal Fury: King of Fighters; PAL: Fatal Fury: King of Fighters; JP: Garō Densetsu: Shukumei no Tatakai	D4 Enterprise	October 8, 2007	2007-10-05	2007-10-05	September 18, 2007
Magician Lord	D4 Enterprise	October 29, 2007	2007-10-26	2007-10-26	September 28, 2007
World Heroes	D4 Enterprise	October 8, 2007	2007-10-19	2007-10-19	September 28, 2007
NA: Art of Fighting; PAL: Art of Fighting; JP: Ryūko no Ken	D4 Enterprise	October 8, 2007	2007-11-02	2007-11-02	October 9, 2007
NA: Samurai Shodown; PAL: Samurai Shodown; JP: Samurai Spirits	D4 Enterprise	June 16, 2008	2008-05-30	2008-05-30	October 16, 2007
NA: Blue's Journey; PAL: Blue's Journey; JP: Raguy	D4 Enterprise	November 12, 2007	2007-11-09	2007-11-09	October 23, 2007
The King of Fighters '94	D4 Enterprise	January 7, 2008	2007-11-23	2007-11-23	November 6, 2007
Baseball Stars 2	D4 Enterprise	December 10, 2007	2007-11-30	2007-11-30	November 13, 2007
Top Hunter: Roddy & Cathy	D4 Enterprise	December 31, 2007	2007-12-14	2007-12-14	November 20, 2007
Metal Slug	D4 Enterprise	May 26, 2008	2008-05-09	2008-05-09	April 22, 2008
Burning Fight	D4 Enterprise	June 23, 2008	2008-05-30	2008-05-30	May 7, 2008
NA: Fatal Fury 2 PAL: Fatal Fury 2 JP: Garō Densetsu 2: Aratanaru Tatakai	D4 Enterprise	June 30, 2008	2008-06-13	2008-06-13	May 20, 2008
Ninja Combat	D4 Enterprise	June 2, 2008	2008-06-13	2008-06-13	May 27, 2008
King of the Monsters	D4 Enterprise	July 7, 2008	2008-06-27	2008-06-27	June 3, 2008
NA: Art of Fighting 2 PAL: Art of Fighting 2 JP: Ryūko no Ken 2	D4 Enterprise	July 28, 2008	2008-07-11	2008-07-11	June 17, 2008
Ninja Commando	D4 Enterprise	July 14, 2008	2008-07-11	2008-07-11	June 24, 2008
NA: Neo Turf Masters; PAL: Neo Turf Masters; JP: Big Tournament Golf	D4 Enterprise	August 18, 2008	2008-07-25	2008-07-25	July 8, 2008
NA: Samurai Shodown II; PAL: Samurai Shodown II; JP: Shin Samurai Spirits: Haōmaru Jigokuhen	D4 Enterprise	August 25, 2008	2008-08-08	2008-08-08	July 23, 2008
Metal Slug 2	D4 Enterprise	December 1, 2008	2008-11-28	2008-11-28	October 28, 2008
NA: Fatal Fury Special; PAL: Fatal Fury Special; JP: Garō Densetsu Special	D4 Enterprise	March 1, 2010	2010-03-26	2010-03-26	November 4, 2009
NA: Ironclad; PAL: Ironclad (1000 Nintendo Points); JP: Chōtetsu Brikin'ger: Ironclad	D4 Enterprise	April 5, 2010	2010-03-12	2010-03-12	November 24, 2009
The King of Fighters '95	D4 Enterprise	April 26, 2010	2010-04-30	2010-04-30	December 1, 2009
Galaxy Fight: Universal Warriors	D4 Enterprise	Unreleased	Unreleased	Unreleased	March 23, 2010
NA: Fatal Fury 3: Road to the Final Victory; PAL: Fatal Fury 3: Road to the Final Victory; JP: Garō Densetsu 3: Harukanaru Tatakai	D4 Enterprise	October 4, 2010	2010-08-20	2010-08-20	April 20, 2010
NA: Samurai Shodown III: Blades of Blood; PAL: Samurai Shodown III: Blades of Blood; JP: Samurai Spirits: Zankurō Musōken	D4 Enterprise	September 6, 2010	2010-09-03	2010-09-03	April 27, 2010
Waku Waku 7	D4 Enterprise	Unreleased	Unreleased	Unreleased	April 27, 2010
NA: Magical Drop II; PAL: Magical Drop II; JP: Magical Drop 2	D4 Enterprise	November 29, 2010	2010-12-03	2010-12-03	May 25, 2010
NA: Karnov's Revenge; PAL: Karnov's Revenge; JP: Fighter's History Dynamite	D4 Enterprise	December 27, 2010	2010-12-03	2010-12-03	June 8, 2010
~~Flying Power Disc~~ (delisted on December 24, 2013)	D4 Enterprise	Unreleased	Unreleased	Unreleased	June 22, 2010
Magical Drop III	D4 Enterprise	December 27, 2010	2011-01-14	2011-01-14	July 6, 2010
NA: Street Slam; PAL: Street Slam; JP: Dunk Dream	D4 Enterprise	November 1, 2010	2010-10-22	2010-10-22	July 20, 2010
PAL: Spinmaster; JP: Miracle Adventure	D4 Enterprise	Unreleased	2010-11-12	2010-11-12	August 3, 2010
Spinmaster	D4 Enterprise	November 22, 2010	Unreleased	Unreleased	Unreleased
World Heroes Perfect	D4 Enterprise	July 26, 2012	2012-10-18	2012-10-18	January 11, 2011
The King of Fighters '96	D4 Enterprise	July 12, 2012	2012-11-22	2012-11-22	February 15, 2011
Last Resort	D4 Enterprise	Unreleased	Unreleased	Unreleased	March 29, 2011
King of the Monsters 2: The Next Thing	D4 Enterprise	Unreleased	Unreleased	Unreleased	April 12, 2011
Tsūkai GanGan Kōshinkyoku	D4 Enterprise	Unreleased	Unreleased	Unreleased	May 10, 2011
Fire Suplex	D4 Enterprise	Unreleased	Unreleased	Unreleased	May 17, 2011
Fūun Mokushiroku: Kakutou Sousei	D4 Enterprise	Unreleased	Unreleased	Unreleased	May 31, 2011
Joy Joy Kid	D4 Enterprise	Unreleased	Unreleased	Unreleased	June 14, 2011
Fūun: Super Tag Battle	D4 Enterprise	Unreleased	Unreleased	Unreleased	June 28, 2011
League Bowling	D4 Enterprise	Unreleased	Unreleased	Unreleased	July 12, 2011
Ninja Master's: Haō Ninpō Chō	D4 Enterprise	November 22, 2012	2013-01-10	2013-01-10	July 26, 2011
Twinkle Star Sprites	D4 Enterprise	Unreleased	Unreleased	Unreleased	August 9, 2011
NA: Art of Fighting 3: The Path of the Warrior; PAL: Art of Fighting 3: The Path of the Warrior; JP: Art of Fighting: Ryūko no Ken Gaiden	D4 Enterprise	March 21, 2013	2013-06-13	2013-06-13	August 23, 2011
The King of Fighters '97	D4 Enterprise	March 8, 2012	2012-02-09	2012-02-09	September 6, 2011
Crossed Swords	D4 Enterprise	Unreleased	Unreleased	Unreleased	September 20, 2011
NA: Super Baseball 2020; PAL: Super Baseball 2020; JP: 2020-Nen Super Baseball	D4 Enterprise	July 5, 2012	2012-08-23	2012-08-23	October 4, 2011
Shin'ōken	D4 Enterprise	Unreleased	Unreleased	Unreleased	October 18, 2011
NA: Sengoku; PAL: Sengoku; JP: Sengoku Denshō	D4 Enterprise	April 25, 2013	2013-07-25	2013-07-25	November 1, 2011
World Heroes 2	D4 Enterprise	January 10, 2013	2012-12-27	2012-12-27	November 15, 2011
ASO II: Last Guardian	D4 Enterprise	Unreleased	Unreleased	Unreleased	December 6, 2011
World Heroes 2 Jet	D4 Enterprise	February 14, 2013	2013-05-09	2013-05-09	December 20, 2011
NA: Sengoku 2 PAL: Sengoku 2 JP: Sengoku Denshō 2	D4 Enterprise	November 8, 2012	2013-02-07	2013-02-07	January 10, 2012
NA: Real Bout Fatal Fury; PAL: Real Bout Fatal Fury; JP: Real Bout Garō Densetsu	D4 Enterprise	December 13, 2012	2013-04-25	2013-04-25	January 24, 2012
NA: Samurai Shodown IV: Amakusa's Revenge; PAL: Samurai Shodown IV: Amakusa's Revenge; JP: Samurai Spirits: Amakusa Kourin	D4 Enterprise	March 15, 2012	2012-03-08	2012-03-08	February 14, 2012
NA: Real Bout Fatal Fury Special; PAL: Real Bout Fatal Fury Special; JP: Real Bout Garō Densetsu Special	D4 Enterprise	August 9, 2012	2012-09-06	2012-09-06	February 28, 2012
NA: The Last Blade; PAL: The Last Blade; JP: Bakumatsu Roman: Gekka no Kenshi	D4 Enterprise	June 7, 2012	2012-08-02	2012-08-02	March 13, 2012
Soccer Brawl	D4 Enterprise	Unreleased	Unreleased	Unreleased	March 27, 2012
Metal Slug 3	D4 Enterprise	May 31, 2012	2012-05-24	2012-05-24	April 17, 2012
The Super Spy	D4 Enterprise	Unreleased	Unreleased	Unreleased	May 8, 2012
Shock Troopers	D4 Enterprise	October 25, 2012	2012-11-08	2012-11-08	May 22, 2012
Pulstar	D4 Enterprise	Unreleased	Unreleased	Unreleased	June 5, 2012
NA: Real Bout Fatal Fury 2: The Newcomers; PAL: Real Bout Fatal Fury 2: The Newcomers; JP: Real Bout Garō Densetsu 2: The Newcomers	D4 Enterprise	September 27, 2012	2012-10-04	2012-10-04	June 19, 2012
Metal Slug X	D4 Enterprise	August 23, 2012	2012-09-13	2012-09-13	July 10, 2012
Stakes Winner	D4 Enterprise	Unreleased	Unreleased	Unreleased	July 17, 2012
Blazing Star	D4 Enterprise	Unreleased	Unreleased	Unreleased	August 21, 2012
NA: The Last Blade 2 PAL: The Last Blade 2 JP: Bakumatsu Roman Daini Maku: Gekka no Kenshi - Tsuki ni Saku Hana, Chiri Yuku Hana	D4 Enterprise	October 11, 2012	2012-12-06	2012-12-06	August 21, 2012
Shock Troopers: 2nd Squad	D4 Enterprise	December 27, 2012	2013-04-04	2013-04-04	September 18, 2012
NA: The King of Fighters '98: The Slugfest; PAL: The King of Fighters '98: The Slugfest; JP: The King of Fighters '98: Dream Match Never Ends	D4 Enterprise	March 7, 2013	2013-05-30	2013-05-30	October 23, 2012
Metal Slug 4	D4 Enterprise	January 31, 2013	2013-03-07	2013-03-07	November 20, 2012
The King of Fighters '99: Millennium Battle	D4 Enterprise	May 16, 2013	2013-07-04	2013-07-04	December 18, 2012
NAM-1975	D4 Enterprise	April 4, 2013	2013-08-15	2013-08-15	January 22, 2013
Stakes Winner 2	D4 Enterprise	Unreleased	Unreleased	Unreleased	February 12, 2013
Tokuten Oh: Honō no Libero	D4 Enterprise	Unreleased	Unreleased	Unreleased	March 12, 2013
NA: Sengoku 3 PAL: Sengoku 3 JP: Sengoku Denshō 2001	D4 Enterprise	June 6, 2013	2013-09-05	2013-09-05	April 9, 2013

=== Commodore 64 ===
Title	Publisher(s)	North America release date	Europe release date	Australia release date	Japan release date
NA: International Karate; PAL: ~~International Karate~~	NA: Commodore Gaming; PAL: Commodore Gaming	February 23, 2009	2008-03-28	Unreleased	Unreleased
~~Uridium~~	Commodore Gaming	Unreleased	2008-03-28	Unreleased	Unreleased
NA: California Games; PAL: ~~California Games~~	NA: Commodore Gaming; PAL: Commodore Gaming	July 6, 2009	2008-04-11	Unreleased	Unreleased
~~Impossible Mission~~	Commodore Gaming	Unreleased	2008-04-11	Unreleased	Unreleased
NA: The Last Ninja; PAL: ~~The Last Ninja~~	NA: Commodore Gaming; PAL: Commodore Gaming	February 23, 2009	2008-04-25	Unreleased	Unreleased
~~World Games~~	Commodore Gaming	Unreleased	2008-04-25	Unreleased	Unreleased
~~Paradroid~~	Commodore Gaming	Unreleased	2008-05-23	Unreleased	Unreleased
NA: Last Ninja 2: Back with a Vengeance; PAL: ~~Last Ninja 2: Back with a Vengeance~~	NA: Commodore Gaming; PAL: Commodore Gaming	September 21, 2009	2008-06-13	Unreleased	Unreleased
NA: Tower Toppler; PAL: ~~Nebulus~~	NA: Commodore Gaming; PAL: Commodore Gaming	May 4, 2009	2008-06-13	Unreleased	Unreleased
NA: Cybernoid: The Fighting Machine; PAL: ~~Cybernoid: The Fighting Machine~~	NA: Commodore Gaming; PAL: Commodore Gaming	November 9, 2009	2008-06-27	Unreleased	Unreleased
NA: Summer Games II; PAL: ~~Summer Games II~~	NA: Commodore Gaming; PAL: Commodore Gaming	March 16, 2009	2008-06-27	Unreleased	Unreleased
~~International Karate +~~	Commodore Gaming	Unreleased	2008-07-25	Unreleased	Unreleased
NA: Pitstop II; PAL: ~~Pitstop II~~	NA: Commodore Gaming; PAL: Commodore Gaming	February 23, 2009	2008-08-08	Unreleased	Unreleased
NA: Boulder Dash; PAL: ~~Boulder Dash~~	NA: Commodore Gaming; PAL: Commodore Gaming	June 1, 2009	2008-09-19	Unreleased	Unreleased
~~Jumpman~~	Commodore Gaming	Unreleased	2008-09-19	Unreleased	Unreleased
~~Mayhem in Monsterland~~	Commodore Gaming	Unreleased	2008-10-17	Unreleased	Unreleased
~~Impossible Mission II~~	Commodore Gaming	Unreleased	2008-12-12	Unreleased	Unreleased
~~Last Ninja 3~~ (delisted on 2010-02-23)	Commodore Gaming	Unreleased	2008-12-12	Unreleased	Unreleased
~~Winter Games~~	Commodore Gaming	Unreleased	2009-02-20	Unreleased	Unreleased

=== MSX ===
These games were only available in Japan. They costed 700 Wii Points and can be played with the Wii Remote, Classic Controller, or GameCube controller.

Title	Publisher(s)	Platform	North America release date	Europe release date	Australia release date	Japan release date
~~Aleste~~ (delisted on May 22, 2012)	D4 Enterprise	MSX2	Unreleased	Unreleased	Unreleased	May 27, 2008
~~Eggy~~ (delisted on May 22, 2012)	D4 Enterprise	MSX	Unreleased	Unreleased	Unreleased	July 29, 2008
Road Fighter	Konami	MSX	Unreleased	Unreleased	Unreleased	November 24, 2009
Space Manbow	Konami	MSX2	Unreleased	Unreleased	Unreleased	November 24, 2009
Yumetairiku Adventure	Konami	MSX	Unreleased	Unreleased	Unreleased	November 24, 2009
Metal Gear	Konami	MSX2	Unreleased	Unreleased	Unreleased	December 8, 2009
Yie-Gah-kōtei no Gyakushū: Yie Ar Kung-Fu 2	Konami	MSX	Unreleased	Unreleased	Unreleased	December 8, 2009
Gradius 2	Konami	MSX	Unreleased	Unreleased	Unreleased	December 22, 2009
Majou Densetsu	Konami	MSX	Unreleased	Unreleased	Unreleased	December 22, 2009
Parodius: Tako wa Chikyū wo Sukū	Konami	MSX	Unreleased	Unreleased	Unreleased	January 12, 2010
Salamander	Konami	MSX	Unreleased	Unreleased	Unreleased	January 12, 2010
Contra	Konami	MSX2	Unreleased	Unreleased	Unreleased	February 2, 2010
Quarth	Konami	MSX2	Unreleased	Unreleased	Unreleased	February 2, 2010
Gofer no Yabou: Episode II	Konami	MSX	Unreleased	Unreleased	Unreleased	March 30, 2010
Metal Gear 2: Solid Snake	Konami	MSX2	Unreleased	Unreleased	Unreleased	March 30, 2010

=== Virtual Console Arcade ===
Title	Publisher(s)	North America release date	Europe release date	Australia release date	Japan release date
Gaplus	NA: Bandai Namco; PAL: Bandai Namco Entertainment; JP: Bandai Namco Games	March 25, 2009	2009-03-25	2009-03-25	March 26, 2009
Mappy	NA: Bandai Namco; PAL: Bandai Namco Entertainment; JP: Bandai Namco Games	March 25, 2009	2009-03-25	2009-03-25	April 14, 2009
Star Force	Tecmo	March 25, 2009	2009-03-25	2009-03-25	March 26, 2009
NA: The Tower of Druaga; PAL: The Tower of Druaga; JP: Druaga no Tou	NA: Bandai Namco; PAL: Bandai Namco Entertainment; JP: Bandai Namco Games	March 25, 2009	2009-03-25	2009-03-25	May 12, 2009
Emeraldia	Bandai Namco Games	Unreleased	Unreleased	Unreleased	March 26, 2009
Ishtar no Fukkatsu	Bandai Namco Games	Unreleased	Unreleased	Unreleased	March 26, 2009
Solvalou	Bandai Namco Games	Unreleased	Unreleased	Unreleased	March 26, 2009
NA: Space Harrier; PAL: Space Harrier (800 Nintendo Points); JP: Space Harrier	Sega	June 15, 2009	2009-05-29	2009-05-29	March 26, 2009
Genpei Tōma Den	Bandai Namco Games	Unreleased	Unreleased	Unreleased	March 31, 2009
Cosmo Gang the Puzzle	Bandai Namco Games	Unreleased	Unreleased	Unreleased	April 7, 2009
Space Invaders	Taito	Unreleased	Unreleased	Unreleased	April 7, 2009
Starblade	Bandai Namco Games	Unreleased	Unreleased	Unreleased	April 21, 2009
Numan Athletics	Bandai Namco Games	Unreleased	Unreleased	Unreleased	April 28, 2009
Yokai Dochuki	Bandai Namco Games	Unreleased	Unreleased	Unreleased	April 28, 2009
Cyber Sled	Bandai Namco Games	Unreleased	Unreleased	Unreleased	May 19, 2009
Splatterhouse	Bandai Namco Games	Unreleased	Unreleased	Unreleased	May 26, 2009
NA: Altered Beast; PAL: Altered Beast (900 Nintendo Points); JP: Juuouki	Sega	September 28, 2009	2009-06-26	2009-06-26	June 2, 2009
Hopping Mappy	Bandai Namco Games	Unreleased	Unreleased	Unreleased	June 2, 2009
Assault	Bandai Namco Games	Unreleased	Unreleased	Unreleased	June 9, 2009
Wonder Momo	Bandai Namco Games	Unreleased	Unreleased	Unreleased	June 16, 2009
Galaga '88	Bandai Namco Games	Unreleased	Unreleased	Unreleased	June 23, 2009
NA: Golden Axe; PAL: Golden Axe (900 Nintendo Points); JP: Golden Axe	Sega	October 26, 2009	2009-09-18	2009-09-18	June 23, 2009
Marvel Land	Bandai Namco Games	Unreleased	Unreleased	Unreleased	June 30, 2009
Sky Kid	Bandai Namco Games	Unreleased	Unreleased	Unreleased	July 7, 2009
Burning Force	Bandai Namco Games	Unreleased	Unreleased	Unreleased	July 14, 2009
NA: Shinobi; PAL: Shinobi (800 Nintendo Points); JP: Shinobi	Sega	December 7, 2009	2009-10-23	2009-10-23	July 14, 2009
Rolling Thunder	Bandai Namco Games	Unreleased	Unreleased	Unreleased	July 21, 2009
NA: Ninja Gaiden; PAL: Ninja Gaiden (800 Nintendo Points); JP: Ninja Ryūkenden	Tecmo	December 21, 2009	2009-11-13	2009-11-13	July 28, 2009
Phelios	Bandai Namco Games	Unreleased	Unreleased	Unreleased	July 28, 2009
Tecmo Bowl	Tecmo	August 3, 2009	Unreleased	Unreleased	September 29, 2009
Cosmo Gang the Video	Bandai Namco Games	Unreleased	Unreleased	Unreleased	August 4, 2009
Pac-Mania	Bandai Namco Games	Unreleased	Unreleased	Unreleased	August 4, 2009
Bomb Jack	Tecmo	Unreleased	Unreleased	Unreleased	August 18, 2009
Knuckle Heads	Bandai Namco Games	Unreleased	Unreleased	Unreleased	August 18, 2009
NA: Solomon's Key; PAL: Solomon's Key; JP: Solomon no Kagi	Tecmo	November 30, 2009	2009-09-11	2009-09-11	August 18, 2009
Finest Hour	Bandai Namco Games	Unreleased	Unreleased	Unreleased	August 25, 2009
Xevious	Bandai Namco Games	Unreleased	Unreleased	Unreleased	September 1, 2009
Dragon Spirit	Bandai Namco Games	Unreleased	Unreleased	Unreleased	September 8, 2009
NA: Rygar; PAL: Rygar (600 Nintendo Points); JP: Argus no Senshi	Tecmo	October 19, 2009	2009-09-11	2009-09-11	September 8, 2009
Dragon Buster	Bandai Namco Games	Unreleased	Unreleased	Unreleased	September 15, 2009
Dragon Saber	Bandai Namco Games	Unreleased	Unreleased	Unreleased	September 15, 2009
Galaxian	Bandai Namco Games	Unreleased	Unreleased	Unreleased	September 29, 2009
Märchen Maze	Bandai Namco Games	Unreleased	Unreleased	Unreleased	September 29, 2009
Chōzetsurin Jin: Bravoman	Bandai Namco Games	Unreleased	Unreleased	Unreleased	October 6, 2009
New Rally-X	Bandai Namco Games	Unreleased	Unreleased	Unreleased	October 6, 2009
Baraduke	Bandai Namco Games	Unreleased	Unreleased	Unreleased	October 13, 2009
Baraduke II	Bandai Namco Games	Unreleased	Unreleased	Unreleased	October 13, 2009
Dig Dug	Bandai Namco Games	Unreleased	Unreleased	Unreleased	October 20, 2009
Dig Dug II	Bandai Namco Games	Unreleased	Unreleased	Unreleased	October 20, 2009
Face Off	Bandai Namco Games	Unreleased	Unreleased	Unreleased	October 27, 2009
Rolling Thunder 2	Bandai Namco Games	Unreleased	Unreleased	Unreleased	October 27, 2009
Grobda	Bandai Namco Games	Unreleased	Unreleased	Unreleased	November 10, 2009
Tank Force	Bandai Namco Games	Unreleased	Unreleased	Unreleased	November 10, 2009
Bosconian	Bandai Namco Games	Unreleased	Unreleased	Unreleased	November 17, 2009
Libble Rabble	Bandai Namco Games	Unreleased	Unreleased	Unreleased	November 17, 2009
Galaga	Bandai Namco Games	Unreleased	Unreleased	Unreleased	November 24, 2009
Toy Pop	Bandai Namco Games	Unreleased	Unreleased	Unreleased	November 24, 2009
Ordyne	Bandai Namco Games	Unreleased	Unreleased	Unreleased	December 1, 2009
Rompers	Bandai Namco Games	Unreleased	Unreleased	Unreleased	December 1, 2009
Quester	Bandai Namco Games	Unreleased	Unreleased	Unreleased	December 8, 2009
Valkyrie no Densetsu	Bandai Namco Games	Unreleased	Unreleased	Unreleased	December 8, 2009
Zaxxon	Sega	April 12, 2010	2010-03-05	2010-03-05	December 15, 2009
Crazy Climber	Hamster	Unreleased	Unreleased	Unreleased	February 23, 2010
Moon Cresta	Hamster	Unreleased	Unreleased	Unreleased	March 9, 2010
~~Karate Dou~~ (delisted on February 1, 2013)	Hamster	Unreleased	Unreleased	Unreleased	March 16, 2010
Mr. Do!	Hamster	Unreleased	Unreleased	Unreleased	April 27, 2010
NA: SonSon; PAL: SonSon (800 Nintendo Points); JP: SonSon	Capcom	December 6, 2010	2010-12-17	2010-12-17	September 7, 2010
NA: Super Hang-On; PAL: Super Hang-On (900 Nintendo Points); JP: Super Hang-On	Sega	May 3, 2012	2012-05-03	2012-05-03	September 14, 2010
NA: Exed Exes; PAL: Exed Exes (800 Nintendo Points); JP: Exed Exes	Capcom	January 10, 2011	2011-01-07	2011-01-07	September 21, 2010
NA: Wolf of the Battlefield: Commando; PAL: Wolf of the Battlefield: Commando (800 Nintendo Points); JP: Senjō no Ōkami	Capcom	December 6, 2010	2010-12-17	2010-12-17	October 5, 2010
NA: Ghosts 'n Goblins; JP: Makaimura	Capcom	January 10, 2011	Unreleased	Unreleased	November 16, 2010
NA: Black Tiger; PAL: Black Tiger (800 Nintendo Points); JP: Black Dragon	Capcom	January 24, 2011	2011-01-21	2011-01-21	December 7, 2010
NA: 1942; PAL: 1942 (800 Nintendo Points); JP: 1942	Capcom	January 24, 2011	2011-01-21	2011-01-21	December 21, 2010
Ghosts 'n Goblins (800 Nintendo Points)	Capcom	Unreleased	2011-01-07	2011-01-07	Unreleased
Puyo Puyo	Sega	Unreleased	Unreleased	Unreleased	April 12, 2011
Puyo Puyo 2	Sega	Unreleased	Unreleased	Unreleased	June 7, 2011
NA: Wonder Boy in Monster Land; PAL: Wonder Boy in Monster Land (900 Nintendo Points); JP: Wonder Boy: Monster Land	Sega	December 6, 2012	2012-05-10	2012-05-10	June 21, 2011
Nekketsu Kōha Kunio-kun	D4 Enterprise	Unreleased	Unreleased	Unreleased	March 6, 2012
Ikki	D4 Enterprise	Unreleased	Unreleased	Unreleased	July 24, 2012
Shanghai	D4 Enterprise	Unreleased	Unreleased	Unreleased	September 4, 2012

== See also ==
- List of Virtual Console games for Wii U
- List of Virtual Console games for Nintendo 3DS
- List of WiiWare games
