= Silent Debuggers =

1991 video game

- North American TurboGrafx-16 box art
- Developer: Data East
- Publishers: NA: NEC International (TurboGrafx-16); JP: Data East (PC Engine)
- Platform: TurboGrafx-16/PC Engine
- Release: JP: March 29, 1991; NA: October 1991
- Genre: First-person shooter
- Mode: Single-player

Silent Debuggers is a 1991 sci-fi horror first-person shooter video game developed and released by Data East for the PC Engine and published by NEC International for the TurboGrafx-16. The player investigates a space freight station called Gane, aided by a partner character named Leon, as they investigate why the station's crew have disappeared. The game features the "Sound Detection System" that detects, searches, and defeats enemies with sound. Silent Debuggers was notable for the TurboGrafx-16 in how it is an early entry in the first-person shooter genre.

The game was released in North America in 1991 and in Japan on March 29, 1991. It was re-released on the Virtual Console in Japan on June 26, 2007, in North America on July 16, 2007 and in Europe and Australia on July 20, 2007. However, the Virtual Console version was delisted in early March 2012.

== Plot ==
From the Silent Debuggers Game Manual by NEC Technologies, 1991:

The Great War is over. Mankind is united into one peaceful world. Or is it?

While the Joint Government pursues a policy of "Advancement into Outer Space" it encounters pockets of resistance. The evil forces ("Bugs") must be destroyed before they threaten the peace of the Universe. Yet there are no armies, only small groups of highly paid soldiers left over from the Great War. The most famous of these groups is the "Silent Debuggers". Powerful and mysterious, now the government calls upon them again. As an aspiring Debugger with your sidekick Leon, you are assigned to enter the Evil Space Station Gane. While it is rumoured that riches abound, no Debugger has ever returned from this fortress of evil.

== Gameplay ==
Silent Debuggers title screen.

Players explore the Gane cargo station in search of treasure which, when recovered, will triggers the station's self-destruct sequence. The player must then progress from level to level, killing every monster on that floor in order to advance. On the lowest floor is a computer that must be "debugged" in order to stop the self-destruct sequence. The player is assisted by a buddy character, a fellow debugger named Leon who provides information and weapons. The game restricts the player's ability to look up and down. Selecting higher difficulties will also cause a monster to spawn on the ceiling, which is harder to detect on the game's viewfinder.

=== System ===
The gameplay takes place within a first-person viewfinder, through which the player spots and attacks aliens with various guns and weaponry. The player's energy is provided by two battery packs and is consumed whenever attacked by an enemy or when using the jump command.

From the station's second floor onwards, the game implements a time limit wherein all the floors must be cleared within 100 minutes before the station's self-destruct sequence commences. If the player resumes via the game's continue system, the game takes 5 minutes off of the remaining time counter each time they try again. This is explained in-game as the player losing energy from being attacked.

The game's ending contains a sequel hook, but no sequel was ever released, nor put into development.

=== Sound Detection System ===
The game's most prominent feature is its sound-based enemy search system. The game's interface has a "sound sensor" that announces the distance and position of incoming enemies with sound effects that increase in volume and "move" through the game's left-and-right stereo audio channels. The interface's colour sensor blinks blue → yellow → red as the enemy gets closer. When the enemy enters the visual field, sound cues will play, and colour alerts will flash on the sides of the game interface. The sound sensor will change to a alarm when the player gets closer to enemies, and the enemy aliens have vocal sound effects when they attack. The game can still be played in monaural mode but the player cannot track the left-and-right auditory positions.

== Staff ==
Silent Debuggers was produced by a small team of Data East staff members. Much of this staff was credited in-game via pseudonyms.

- Planning: TDR Watanabe
- Graphics: Takehiko Ishiro (as "68000 Isiro")
- Programmer: Kōji Sasamoto (as "Works Sasamoto")
- Sound: Nyanko Sakai, Shogo Sakai (as "Syougo"), Masaaki Iwasaki (as "Kosei"), Takashi Miura (as "Atomic Takafumi"), Yusuke Takahama, Yūji Suzuki
- Test player: Verago Nakamura
- Director: A. Kawai
- Producer: Tokinori Kaneyasu

== Reception ==
Reception

Review scores
Publication	Score
Eurogamer	6/10
Famitsu	6/10, 7/10, 8/10, 7/10
Game Informer	6.75/10
GameSpot	3.5/10
Gekkan PC Engine	75/100, 90/100, 80/100, 85/100, 75/100
IGN	4.5/10
Marukatsu PC Engine	9/10, 7/10, 7/10, 7/10
Nintendo Life	3/10
VideoGames & Computer Entertainment	7/10
Hippon Super!	6/10
TurboPlay	7/10

Silent Debuggers received a 20.84/30 score in a 1993 readers' poll conducted by PC Engine Fan, ranking among PC Engine titles at the number 274 spot. The game garnered mixed reviews from critics.

The game has been cited as an inspiration for Enemy Zero by Warp and Kenji Eno. In particular, Silent Debuggers's "Sound Detection System" influenced the similar game mechanic featured in Enemy Zero.
