= Dead Moon (video game) =

1991 video game

- North American box art
- Developer: Zap
- Publishers: JP: TSS; NA: Natsume Inc.
- Platform: TurboGrafx-16
- Release: JP: February 22, 1991; NA: 1992
- Genre: Scrolling shooter
- Mode: Single-player

Dead Moon (デッドムーン 月世界の悪夢, Dead Moon: Tsuki Sekai no Akumu; lit. "Dead Moon: Nightmare of the Moon World") is a horizontally scrolling shooter released for the TurboGrafx-16. It was developed by Zap and published by TSS on February 22, 1991 in Japan and later in 1992 in North America. It was re-released for the Wii Virtual Console in 2007 by Natsume Inc.

== Gameplay ==
Dead Moon features similar gameplay to other horizontally scrolling shoot 'em ups of the era like Gradius and Darius, with enemies attacking the player's ship in sweeping patterns and weapon power-ups that double as one-time shields. The ship can be upgraded with up to three of the same power-up, and any damage will reduce these power-ups by one. Collecting additional power-ups of the same type will reward the player with screen-clearing bombs. Clearing all six levels unlocks a hard mode in which enemies take twice as much damage.

== Reception ==
Reception

Review scores
| Publication | Score |
|---|---|
| AllGame | 3/5 |
| Electronic Gaming Monthly | 7/10, 8/10, 7/10, 7/10 |
| GameFan | 82%, 85% |
| Games-X | 78% |
| Gekkan PC Engine | 75/100, 90/100, 80/100, 80/100, 70/100 |
| Génération 4 | 68% |
| Joystick | 86% |
| Player One | 94% |
| Tilt | 16/20 |
| Zero | 85/100 |
| Game Zone | 3/5 |
| Hippon Super! | 6/10 |
| Micro News | 4/6 |
| Power Play | 48% |
| TurboPlay | 5/10 |

Dead Moon received mixed reviews from critics. GamePro's Uggs the Bug deemed Dead Moon to be a likeable shooter for intermediate players.
