= Digital Champ: Battle Boxing =

1989 video game

- Cover art
- Developer: Naxat Soft
- Publisher: Naxat Soft
- Platform: TurboGrafx-16
- Release: JP: October 13, 1989
- Genre: Sports
- Mode: Single-player

Digital Champ: Battle Boxing is a boxing video game developed and published by Naxat Soft for the TurboGrafx-16. The game was released on the Wii's Virtual Console in Japan on April 15, 2008, Europe on May 16, 2008, and in North America on October 20, 2008. It was also released in the mid-2010s for the Virtual Console on the Wii U.

The game takes place in the fictional year 20XX, with the main player as a mutant fighting hordes of boxer clones before facing off against a robotic boxer. Three clone opponents exist; Marciano, Mick and Samson. Each match is a maximum of twelve rounds, each being three minutes.
