= The Ignition Factor =

1994 SNES video game

Fire Fighting The Ignition Factor
- Box cover for Fire Fighting
- Developer: Jaleco
- Publisher: Jaleco
- Platforms: SNES, Virtual Console
- Release: SNES: JP: November 11, 1994; NA: January 1995; Wii Virtual Console: JP: March 1, 2011; NA: August 25, 2011; PAL: April 29, 2011; Wii U Virtual Console: NA: September 24, 2015
- Genre: Action
- Mode: Single-player

The Ignition Factor, known in Japan as Fire Fighting (ファイヤー・ファイティング), is a video game for the Super Nintendo Entertainment System published by Jaleco. The game features firefighters in realistic situations saving civilians in burning buildings, mining incidents, and industrial accidents. It was released on the Wii Virtual Console in Japan on March 1, 2011, in the PAL region on April 29, 2011, and in North America on August 25, 2011, as well as the Nintendo Classics service on December 18, 2020.

== Gameplay ==
The player-controlled character fights a fire.

The Ignition Factor is a 2D adventure where the player controls a firefighter through emergency situations in differing locations. Each level consists of multiple rooms, areas, or building floors where players can possibly explore, extinguish fires, and rescue people. Most levels dictate a specific number of people that must be saved within a set time limit for the mission to be considered a success. Fire spreads throughout an area automatically, and the player can be injured when touching a patch of fire on screen. The player can also be harmed by falling through holes in the floor.

The player has various tools of firefighting at their disposal. Before a level begins, the player may choose the primary and secondary equipment with which they wish to begin the level. Only one of each type of equipment can be equipped at once. Primary equipment consists of an oxygen mask and tank and three types of fire extinguishers that correspond to the different types of fires that can be encountered in the game; regular, chemical, and electrical. These fires and their extinguishers are red-orange, green, and blue, respectively. As these are used, a counter goes from 99 to 0. The counter of the regular extinguisher rapidly increases back to 99 after a brief period of inactivity, while the oxygen tank and mask and the other extinguishers can only go back to 99 after being resupplied by allies in the level. Secondary equipment consists of a firefighter's axe, a rope for crossing gaps, a metal pole to reveal holes by checking for weak places in the floor, plastic explosives to blow through debris and certain wall sections, and CO_{2} bombs to extinguish large areas of fire. Only five plastic explosives and CO_{2} bombs can be carried at one time and can be replenished by an ally on the map.

=== Controls ===
The direction pad is used to direct the character on screen. Pressing the pad twice in one direction causes the character to sprint. Though the character can walk diagonally, he can not run diagonally. The character can jump with the use of the B button and can kick in jammed doors with the X button. The Y and A buttons are used to initiate the actions of the primary equipment and the secondary equipment that are equipped respectively. The use of the Start button pauses the game and brings up the inventory screen while the select button pauses the game and brings up the map screen.

The character is only capable of carrying five items (including the required red extinguisher/oxygen tank and mask) before their weight begins to affect his actions. While carrying five or six items, he is incapable of running or kicking but he will still walk at his normal speed. If he carries seven or more items not only can he not run or kick, his walking speed is drastically reduced.

Failing a mission occurs when the player either dies or runs out of time. The player is then shown a screen that displays the number of chances left (the game's term for continues) and is given the choice to try again, quit, or enter a password. The game allows the player a total of three chances. If the player chooses the try again, one chance is consumed and the player is returned to the level select screen and allowed to select a different level or retry the same level. If all chances are used, the game is over.

== Reception ==
Reception

Review scores
Publication	Score
Electronic Gaming Monthly	9/10, 8/10, 7/10, 9/10
Famitsu	22/40
Game Informer	7/10
Game Players	76%
Hyper	80%
Next Generation	3/5
Electronic Games	B
Flux	B
VideoGames	8/10

The Ignition Factor received a 18.2/30 score in a readers' poll conducted by Super Famicom Magazine. The game garnered varying levels of critical response. Electronic Gaming Monthly's four reviewers gave it their "Game of the Month" award, commenting that the game is an excellent test of the player's wits, the graphics are impressive, and the numerous ways to solve each problem ensures that every playthrough is unique. GamePro's Sarah Nade gave it a far more mixed review, criticizing that the graphics are average, the voice is annoying, and the controls are very touchy. They nonetheless concluded that "The Ignition Factor is a relatively fun strategy game."

Next Generation was still more critical, faulting the game chiefly for its lack of originality: "At first glance, the fire-fighting angle promises a new game play experience, but the title is a repackaged version of older games like Capcom's Commando and Sega's Alien Syndrome. ... The action is good, but stages are repetitive, and mostly just rearrange the placement of hostages without adding any significantly new gameplay". Next Generation reviewed the game a second time, and stated that "The game is fast and furious, but it's over fairly quick, too. A few more levels might have put this over the edge". Flux's Chris Hudak magazine praised the nonviolent gameplay writing: "Ignition Factor is a helluva lot of fun for a game that doesn't involve any killing or space travel."
