= Bio-Hazard Battle =

1992 video game

- North American Genesis box art
- Developer: Sega
- Publisher: Sega
- Composer: Shigeharu Isoda(credited as Kazumi Nasu / K.N.U.)
- Platforms: Sega Genesis, arcade
- Release: JP: October 30, 1992; NA: December 1992; EU: January 1993
- Genre: Scrolling shooter
- Modes: Single-player, multiplayer
- Arcade system: Sega Mega Play

Bio-Hazard Battle, released in Japan as Crying: Aseimei Sensou (クライング 亜生命戦争, Crying: Sublife War), is a 1992 scrolling shooter released for the Sega Genesis and Sega Mega Play arcade platform. It was made available on the Wii's Virtual Console in February 2007. The game was also re-released on the Steam platform in October 2010. An unreleased X68000 version exists currently under ownership of M2 CEO Naoki Horii.

== Plot ==
During the first global biowar on the planet Avaron, a retrovirus was released as a deadly reprisal from the enemy. The viruses unleashed biological forces which couldn't be stopped, leaving the planet filled with new and deadly forms of life.

Only a few survivors remain in suspended animation in O.P. Odysseus, an orbiting platform circling Avaron. The space station's purpose is to keep the surviving humans alive until Avaron is habitable again. The crew of the Odysseus, along with four organic ships known as the "Biowarriors", have been frozen in cryogenic tanks for hundreds of years, and now the onboard computer has awakened them.

Computer probes show that conditions on Avaron are hostile, but livable. The Biowarriors are sent to Avaron to scout areas which the probes have designated least hostile, ascertaining planetary conditions and, ultimately finding a new home for the remaining survivors. The game ends showing all four characters flying back into the mothership.

== Gameplay ==
The player character (lower left) dodging enemies and shooting using an 8-directional weapon.

The game is a 2D horizontally scrolling shooter. The character chosen by the player can be moved in 8 directions by the D-Pad. The player can move, shoot, dodge, and block. To block an enemy projectile, the player must place the Power Star in the path of the projectile. There is also an array of different weapons at the ships' disposal. Four different craft are available and each has different weapons. Their flight speeds also vary.

The player begins with a pre-set number of lives, from 1 to 5, 3 being the default. When a player is hit by a hostile creature or environment, their ship is destroyed and will reappear with one less life. Extra lives are attainable by absorbing 1-UP icons in the various stages, or reaching milestones for accumulating points without getting Game Over. 20,000, 50,000 and 100,000 points are the first three.

The game also features strong usage of deep, bass-heavy music tracks, creative and colorful artwork and foreground and background elements. Despite the many obstacles in the scenery and landscape, the player cannot be harmed or die by bumping into anything other than an enemy or enemy fire. Players can, however, die by being crushed between the screen's edge and a wall. Scrolling and enemy movement is extremely fast in comparison to other games of its time. The player travels through eight levels, each one increasing in difficulty, with the last three only being available on the higher difficulties.

== Reception ==
Reception

Aggregate score
Aggregator	Score
GameRankings	68.60% (GEN)

Review scores
Publication	Score
MegaTech	88%
Mega	75%
