= World Sports Competition =

1992 video game

- Developer: Make Software
- Publisher: Hudson Soft
- Platform: PC Engine/TurboGrafx-16
- Release: 1992
- Genre: Sports
- Modes: Single-player, multiplayer

World Sports Competition is a sports video game developed by Make Software and published by Hudson Soft for the PC Engine in 1992 and released on the TurboGrafx-16 in 1993. It has also been released on the PlayStation Network in Japan and North America and on the Virtual Console in Europe and North America. The game has a Summer Olympics theme and features several events, including archery, rowing, shooting, swimming, and track and field.

The game is known in Japan as Power Sports which was part of the Power Sports Series, a series of sports games released between 1988 and 1998.

== See also ==
- Summer Games
