= Legend of Hero Tonma =

1989 video game

Legend Of Hero Tonma
- Japanese arcade flyer of Legend of Hero Tonma.
- Developer: Irem
- Publisher: Irem
- Platforms: Arcade, TurboGrafx-16
- Release: Arcade: 1989; TurboGrafx-16: February 1993^{NA}
- Genre: Platform
- Modes: Single-player, multiplayer
- Arcade system: Irem M72

Legend of Hero Tonma (レジェンド・オブ・ヒーロー・トンマ) is a side scrolling platform game released by Irem to arcades in 1989. The player controls a caped hero named Tommy in his quest to rescue a princess. Tommy can cast fireballs (which can be upgraded in power) to dispatch enemies, and jump on their heads to temporarily stun them.

The game was ported to the TurboGrafx-16 in 1991 and localized to North America in 1993. The TurboGrafx-16 version was re-released on the Wii Virtual Console in Japan on September 4, 2007, in North America on September 24, (delisted on March 30, 2012; returning in September 2013), and in PAL regions on September 28. The game was then released for the Wii U Virtual Console in Japan on March 18, 2015, and in North America and Europe on October 12, 2017.

== Reception ==
In Japan, Game Machine listed Legend of Hero Tonma on their June 1, 1989 issue as being the tenth most-popular arcade game for the previous two weeks.
