= Cho Aniki (video game) =

1992 video game

- Developer: Masaya
- Publishers: JP: Nippon Computer Systems; JP/NA: Hudson Soft (Virtual Console); JP: D4 Enterprise (Project EGG); WW: Edia (Nintendo Switch)
- Composer: Koji Hayama
- Series: Cho Aniki
- Platform: PC Engine Super CD-ROM² System
- Release: PC Engine Super CD-ROM²: JP: December 25, 1992; Windows: JP: October 29, 2003 (as Project EGG); Nintendo Switch: JP: December 12, 2024; WW: January 29, 2025
- Genre: Scrolling shooter
- Mode: Single player

Cho Aniki (超兄貴, Chō Aniki; lit. "Super Big Brother") is a 1992 side-scrolling shooter video game developed by Masaya Games and published by Nippon Computer Systems (NCS). The first game in the Cho Aniki series, it was originally released in 1992 on the PC Engine Super CD-ROM² System add-on. Many years later, the game was released as part of Project EGG for Microsoft Windows only in Japan, the Wii Virtual Console and the PC Engine/TurboGrafx-16 Mini worldwide, making it the first time this game has seen the release in Western regions. Cho Aniki was also included with the sequel Ai Cho Aniki as part of Cho Aniki Collection for the Nintendo Switch, which was first released in Japan on December 12, 2024 and then in North America and Europe on January 29, 2025.

== Plot ==
The game's plot involves the heroes moving through various locations — space, urban environments, elaborate ruins — and fighting alien invaders. Bo Emperor Bill (Botei-biru, a pun on bodibil, a shortened form of bodybuild in Japanese), the man who achieved ten consecutive victories in the Great Galaxy Bodybuilding contest, faces an ever-decreasing supply of protein. He unilaterally invades neighboring star systems, in order to establish protein factories to replenish his supply. Feeling threatened, the heaven realm sent Idaten and Benten to vanquish Bill. Thus the sweaty hot battle between the muscle brothers (aniki) and Builders Army begins.

== Gameplay ==
From top to bottom, Samson, Idaten, and Uminin in Cho Aniki.

Upon beginning a game or continuing, the player chooses between two playable characters: Idaten, a young man wearing a cape, and Benten, a blue-haired woman.

The player can pick up one of three support options by collecting randomly appearing power-ups. The most common is Samson/Adon, musclebound men clad in Speedos. The two hover about the hero, firing shots from the holes in their bald heads. The pair eventually became the series' mascots. The other options are Angel and Uminin.

The player character's firepower is increased by collecting proteins. They also have a stock of bombs which can be replenished with bomb pickups. Each player character has ten build levels, while each option has five build levels.

== Reception ==
Lucas M. Thomas of IGN rated the Wii Virtual Console game 7.5 (good) for being the weirdest and most nonsensical import to come to the Western Virtual Console so far. Scott Sharkey of 1up.com listed the PC Engine game's sequel as having one of the worst game box covers of all time.

== Soundtrack ==
Cho Aniki: Aniki no Subete is a soundtrack based on the video game. It was released by NEC Avenue in 1993-03-21, then by Columbia Music Entertainment in 1998-05-21.
