= Break In =

1989 video game

- Developer: Naxat Soft
- Publisher: Naxat Soft
- Composer: Takeaki Kunimoto
- Platform: PC Engine
- Release: JP: August 10, 1989
- Genre: Sports simulation
- Modes: Single-player, multiplayer

Break In is a sports simulation video game by Naxat Soft in 1989 for the PC Engine and released only in Japan. The pool (pocket billiards) simulator was re-released on Nintendo's Wii Virtual Console in all nations in 2008. It was later released for the Wii U Virtual Console.

== Gameplay ==
The game simulates playing pool. There are six modes to choose from and up to six players can play together on the Virtual Console release.

== Reception ==
IGN rated the game 5.5 of 10, citing broken English text, and very simple graphics and gameplay. The game received 3 out of 5 stars from VC-Reviews, who said that the game has a wide variety of pool games to choose from and who thought it included everything a pool fan would need to be satisfied for the short term.
