= Ironclad (video game) =

1996 video game

- Developer: Saurus
- Publisher: Saurus
- Director: Takehiro Uematsu
- Producer: Nobuyuki Tanaka
- Programmer: Masaaki Yuki
- Artists: Kaori Ito; Keisuke Tsugita; Kengo Tanaka
- Writer: Makoto Maeda
- Composer: Hiroyuki Takei
- Platform: Neo Geo CD
- Release: JP: September 20, 1996
- Genre: Scrolling shooter
- Modes: Single-player, multiplayer

Ironclad (Note: Also known as Super Iron Brikinger (Japanese: 超鉄ブリキンガー, Hepburn: Chōtetsu Brikin'ger) in Japan.) is a 1996 horizontally scrolling shooter video game developed and published by Saurus for the Neo Geo CD video game console. It was originally developed for the Neo Geo MVS arcade system, and repeatedly advertised as such, but SNK did not release it for unknown reasons despite its completion.

The unreleased MVS version was re-released by D4 Enterprise for Wii via the Virtual Console in Japan on November 24, 2009, and in 2010 in PAL regions on March 12, and in North America on April 5. A port for Microsoft Windows, OS X, Linux and asm.js developed by DotEmu was released by SNK Playmore as part of the Humble NEOGEO 25th Anniversary Bundle on December 15, 2015. The game was later released on GOG.com on October 5, 2017.

== Gameplay ==
Gameplay screenshot

Ironclad is a horizontal-scrolling shooter game.

== Reception ==
Reception

Review score
Publication	Score
Neo Geo Freak	(Neo Geo CD) 9/20

In 2014, HobbyConsolas identified Ironclad as one of the twenty best games for the Neo Geo CD.
