= Drop Off =

1990 video game

- Developer: ISCO Inc.
- Publishers: JP: Data East; NA: NEC
- Platform: TurboGrafx-16
- Release: JP: March 30, 1990; NA: 1990
- Genre: Breakout clone
- Mode: Single-player

Drop Off is a Breakout clone by Data East. The game was published in 1990 for the PC Engine as Drop Rock Hora Hora and subsequently saw a US release for the TurboGrafx-16 as Drop Off.

== Gameplay ==
Gameplay screenshot

The game is a Breakout clone, where the player moves a paddle back and forth in order to destroy objects. Each stage has a set of the same object (for example, apples on the first stage). Unlike Breakout and other comparable games, the player in Drop Off does not automatically lose a life if the paddle touches the floor and the player is never required to hit the objects in order to clear the stage. Instead, the player must avoid the series of objects that are scrolling vertically downward to move on to next stage, and the gameplay is practically identical to Cluster Buster, an earlier title on the DECO Cassette System. The player has the option of switching the direction of their paddle from vertical to horizontal during the game and is free to move the paddle anywhere on the screen.

Drop Off contains 16 stages divided in 5 rounds.

== Release ==
Drop Off was re-released on the Wii's Virtual Console in North America on July 30, 2007 and in Japan on August 28, 2007. It was released for the first time ever in Europe by Nintendo on August 3, 2007 on the Virtual Console. The publisher was G-Mode which currently owns the rights to most of Data East's video games. The game was delisted from the Virtual Console in early March 2012.

== Reception ==
Reception

Review scores
Publication	Score
AllGame	4.5/5
Famitsu	27/40
Génération 4	55%
Joystick	69%
Tilt	13/20
VideoGames & Computer Entertainment	4/10
Power Play	51%
TurboPlay	4/10

Drop Off received mixed reception from critics since its release on the TurboGrafx-16, most of which reviewed it as an import title. Famitsu's four reviewers called it "a deformed Breakout-type" game that felt more modified than Arkanoid due to its ruleset, but they commended the ability to freely move the paddle around the screen was commended. Génération 4's Philippe Querleux regarded it as a "grape breaker" because of the title's use of fruits instead of bricks. Joystick's Jean-Marc Demoly also noted its use of fruits instead of bricks and limited animation in the anime-style introduction sequence. Regardless, Demoly stated that Drop Off was a "well realized" game inspired by Arkanoid and similar titles on computers, giving positive remarks to the audiovisual presentation, animations and controls. Tilt's Alain Huyghues-Lacour compared it with Addictaball for Atari ST due to both titles sharing similar principles. Nevertheless, Huyghues-Lacour found the game to be fun and interesting than other Arkanoid clones, noting that the descending fruit pieces added pressure into the gameplay and praised the visuals, animations and sound effects, but criticized the controls for being less ergonomic than a mouse for these types of games.

Power Play' Henrik Fisch regarded Drop Off as a nice but non-addictive title, criticizing the audiovisual presentation and other aspects. VideoGames & Computer Entertainment's B.W. noted the ability to freely move the paddle around the screen but expressed mixed thoughts about the game's playability, and criticized both the visuals and sound. TurboPlay's Donn Nauert concurred with B.W. when reviewing the title, giving a mixed remark to its playability and criticizing the graphics and sound. In contrast to the other reviewers, AllGame's Shawn Sackenheim called it "one of the best puzzle games on the system." Sackenheim praised its fast action and "tried and true breakout formula", but criticized the visuals for being sparse and repetitive gameplay.

=== Retrospective coverage ===
Commentary on Drop Off has been more negative since its re-release on the Virtual Console. Nintendo Life regarded it as "possibly the worse example of a Breakout style game out there." They found that its gameplay innovations made it cumbersome and criticized the lack of variety and power-ups. IGN's Lucas M. Thomas called it "a half-hearted clone of an old design from the '70s, that was done better... in the '70s." Thomas felt that its premise did not make sense and stated that its gameplay elements did not work together, but commended the addition of boss battles. Eurogamer's Dan Whitehead wrote that the title "It's amusing enough for what it is and can be quite addictive in a simplistic sort of way but, with little variety between levels and no power ups to speak of, I suspect most gamers will find the basic appeal wears off quite rapidly." GameSpot's Frank Provo commended its "few twists" on the Breakout formula, but criticized the game's design for being challenging and the paddle controls for being sluggish.
