= Metal Marines =

1993 video game

- European cover art
- Developers: Namco (SNES); Mindscape (PC)
- Publishers: SNES: WW: Namco; EU: Mindscape; Windows; Mindscape
- Platforms: Super Nintendo Entertainment System, Microsoft Windows
- Release: SNES: NA: December 1993; JP: November 18, 1994; PAL: 1994; Windows: NA: 1994
- Genre: Real-time strategy
- Mode: Single-player

Metal Marines, released in Japan as Militia, (Note: Japanese: ミリティア, Hepburn: Militia) is a 1993 real-time strategy video game developed and published by Namco for the Super Nintendo Entertainment System. It was ported to Microsoft Windows by Mindscape. The Super NES version was re-released on the Virtual Console in Japan on July 10, 2007, for the Wii and on March 4, 2015, for the Wii U, and in North America on October 15, 2007, for the Wii.

== Gameplay ==
In the game, the player must construct both offensive and defensive structures to launch attacks on enemy territory while protecting their own. With the exception of the I.C.B.M. silo, every structure occupies a single square on the map. Bases and a series of other buildings must be built before the operation starts, with the opponents' bases being the player's target. Enemy bases can be attacked with missiles or the titular robot, which can attack enemy territory or protect player territory in close range, but has limited hit points.

== Plot ==
The game is set in the year 2117, two years after a cataclysmic Antimatter War. The player leads a military force whose main unit is the Metal Marine: a 16-meter (50 ft) high, 93-plus ton mecha.

The PC and SNES versions of the game feature a number of minor gameplay differences, namely the plot. In the PC version the player controls a commander of the "United Earth Empire" ("Empire" in short) a futuristic version of United Nations. The adversarial Zorguef's force is a dictatorial government. After conquering all space colonies, Zorguef sets his eyes on Earth and the player must take up arms to protect the planet. In the SNES version the player controls a commander of the "Space Colonies Allied Forces" ("SCAF" in short), an alliance formed by the independent space colonies. The primary mission is to take the battle to the Earth, which is currently in the grip of Zorguef's empire. The goal is to save the humans living on Earth who are being oppressed by Zorguef while securing the future of Space Colonies.

A special "Master Edition" of the PC version was released by Mindscape in 1996. In the Master Edition the characters were given voices, the overall look of the GUI changed, and the game featured better sound and warning effects.

In both versions, the game consists of 20 missions where the player will slowly regain the conquered territories of the Earth until the enemy force is defeated. The game is played in an isometric style when building and in an aerial grid style when planning an attack on the enemy territory. In the PC version both players can attack at the same time, while the SNES version only permits one attack at a time from one of the factions.

== Reception ==
Reception

Aggregate score
Aggregator	Score
GameRankings	69.62% (SNES)

Damien McFerran of Nintendo Life gave the Wii Virtual Console version a 7/10 score, noting the outdated gameplay to be too basic but nevertheless commended the game for its presentation and fun gameplay. In contrast, Lee Meyer of Nintendo Life also gave the Wii U Virtual Console a 7/10 score, criticizing its bland presentation and confusing gameplay but still praised its fun nature and challenge.
