= Samurai-Ghost =

1992 video game

- Developer: Now Production
- Publishers: JP: Namco; NA: Turbo Technologies
- Designer: H. Chatani
- Programmer: Naoki Higashio
- Artists: Masaru Moriya; Takashi Yoshida
- Composer: Miyoshi Okuyama
- Series: Genpei Tōma Den
- Platform: TurboGrafx-16
- Release: JP: April 7, 1992; NA: 1992
- Genre: Hack and slash
- Mode: Single-player

Samurai-Ghost (Note: Known in Japan as The Genji and Heike Clans: Vol. 2 (Japanese: 源平討魔伝 巻ノ弐, Hepburn: Genpei Tōma Den: Kan no Ni)) is a 1992 hack and slash video game released by Namco for the TurboGrafx-16. It is the sequel to Genpei Tōma Den. It was released on the Wii Virtual Console in North America on October 29, 2007, and in Europe on November 2, 2007.

== Gameplay ==
Gameplay screenshot.

As with the previous game, the player controls the resurrected samurai Taira no Kagekiyo, defeating demons and monsters across several levels. Given his undead nature, Kagekiyo has access to supernatural powers such as levitation and the ability to cast energy projectiles.

Samurai-Ghost has a similar plot to its predecessor, in that Kagekiyo fights against Minamoto no Yoshitsune, Saitō Musashibō Benkei, and his arch enemy Minamoto no Yoritomo. Kagekiyo now also faces Minamoto no Yoshinaka (also known as Kiso no Yoshinaka), who commits seppuku when defeated.

== Reception ==
Reception

Review scores
Publication	Score
Electronic Gaming Monthly	20/40
Eurogamer	5/10
Famitsu	6/10, 5/10, 5/10, 5/10
GamesMaster	33%
GameSpot	2/10
Gekkan PC Engine	70/100, 70/100, 80/100, 70/100, 70/100
IGN	2.5/10
Joypad	80%
Joystick	66%
Marukatsu PC Engine	8/10, 7/10, 8/10, 8/10
Nintendo Life	3/10
Play Time	46%

The Japanese publication Micom BASIC Magazine ranked the game fifth in popularity in its July 1992 issue, and it received a 20.28/30 score in a 1993 readers' poll conducted by PC Engine Fan, ranking among PC Engine titles at the number 320 spot. Samurai-Ghost was met with mixed reception from critics.
