= List of Virtual Console games for Wii U =

This is a list of Virtual Console games that were available for purchase on the Wii U via the Nintendo eShop. As of March 27, 2023, the Nintendo 3DS eShop has closed and all games are no longer available for download.

== Available titles ==
In total, 503 Virtual Console games were released for the Nintendo 3DS across all regions. Of these games, 491 were released in Japan, 311 were released in North America, and 300 were released in PAL regions.

=== Nintendo Entertainment System ===
A total of 158 NES games (Note: 149 games in Japan, 94 games in North America, 89 games in PAL regions) were available to purchase. Select Japanese releases are based on their Famicom Disk System versions.

Title	Publisher	JP Release Date	NA Release Date	PAL Release Date
Adventure Island	Konami	September 24, 2014	September 11, 2014	July 3, 2014
The Adventures of Bayou Billy	Konami	September 21, 2016	January 7, 2016	November 26, 2015
Adventures of Lolo	Nintendo	Unreleased	May 15, 2014	August 21, 2014
Adventures of Lolo 2	HAL Laboratory	September 3, 2014	Unreleased	Unreleased
Antarctic Adventure	Konami	June 19, 2014	Unreleased	Unreleased
Atlantis no Nazo	Sunsoft	April 22, 2015	Unreleased	Unreleased
Balloon Fight	Nintendo	April 27, 2013	January 23, 2013	June 27, 2013
Baseball	Nintendo	October 23, 2013	October 24, 2013	October 24, 2013
Baseball Simulator 1.000	Culture Brain	October 26, 2016	July 7, 2016	Unreleased
Bases Loaded	Hamster Corporation	October 22, 2014	July 10, 2014	Unreleased
Battle City	Bandai Namco Entertainment	July 9, 2014	Unreleased	Unreleased
Bio Miracle Bokutte Upa (Note: Japanese version based on Famicom Disk System release.)	Konami	July 15, 2015	Unreleased	Unreleased
Blaster Master	Sunsoft	May 27, 2015	July 16, 2015	February 12, 2015
Bubble Bobble	Square Enix	January 29, 2014	Unreleased	Unreleased
Castlevania	Konami	December 4, 2013	December 19, 2013	March 20, 2014
Castlevania II: Simon's Quest	Konami	March 5, 2014	January 16, 2014	May 1, 2014
Castlevania III: Dracula's Curse	Konami	April 16, 2014	June 26, 2014	September 4, 2014
Championship Lode Runner	Konami	July 8, 2015	Unreleased	Unreleased
Circus Charlie	Konami	June 24, 2015	Unreleased	Unreleased
City Connection	City Connection^{JP} Hamster Corporation^{US}	March 29, 2017	March 17, 2016	Unreleased
Clu Clu Land	Nintendo	November 20, 2013	October 17, 2013	October 17, 2013
Crash 'n' the Boys: Street Challenge	Arc System Works	November 12, 2014	December 11, 2014	December 4, 2014
Devil World	Nintendo	November 5, 2014	Unreleased	October 30, 2014
Dig Dug	Bandai Namco Entertainment	October 15, 2014	February 5, 2015	January 8, 2015
Dig Dug II	Bandai Namco Entertainment	September 7, 2016	March 17, 2016	October 8, 2015
Donkey Kong	Nintendo	July 15, 2013	July 15, 2013	July 15, 2013
Donkey Kong 3	Nintendo	November 6, 2013	September 26, 2013	October 24, 2013
Donkey Kong Jr.	Nintendo	July 15, 2013	April 26, 2013	April 27, 2013
Donkey Kong Jr. Math	Nintendo	April 15, 2015	August 28, 2014	January 22, 2015
Double Dragon	Arc System Works	January 22, 2014	December 12, 2013	March 13, 2014
Double Dragon II: The Revenge	Arc System Works	September 14, 2016	August 14, 2014	August 21, 2014
Double Dragon III: The Sacred Stones	Arc System Works	Unreleased	February 18, 2016	November 26, 2015
Downtown Nekketsu Kōshinkyoku: Soreyuke Daiundōkai	Arc System Works	April 27, 2013	Unreleased	Unreleased
Downtown Special: Kunio-kun no Jidaigeki da yo Zenin Shūgō!	Arc System Works	December 4, 2013	Unreleased	Unreleased
Dr. Mario	Nintendo	February 26, 2014	March 27, 2014	February 13, 2014
Dragon Buster	Bandai Namco Entertainment	January 21, 2015	Unreleased	Unreleased
Duck Hunt	Nintendo	December 24, 2014	December 25, 2014	December 25, 2014
EarthBound Beginnings	Nintendo	June 15, 2015	June 14, 2015	June 15, 2015
Elevator Action	Square Enix	February 19, 2014	Unreleased	Unreleased
Esper Dream	Konami	July 22, 2015	Unreleased	Unreleased
Excitebike	Nintendo	April 27, 2013	April 26, 2013	April 27, 2013
Exerion	Hamster Corporation	September 16, 2015	Unreleased	Unreleased
Famicom Tantei Club: Kieta Kōkeisha (Zengohen)	Nintendo	May 28, 2014	Unreleased	Unreleased
Famicom Wars	Nintendo	December 3, 2014	Unreleased	Unreleased
Field Combat	Hamster Corporation	November 25, 2015	Unreleased	Unreleased
Final Fantasy	Square Enix	November 13, 2013	Unreleased	Unreleased
Final Fantasy II	Square Enix	December 11, 2013	Unreleased	Unreleased
Final Fantasy III	Square Enix	January 8, 2014	Unreleased	Unreleased
Fire Emblem Gaiden	Nintendo	August 20, 2014	Unreleased	Unreleased
Fire Emblem: Shadow Dragon and the Blade of Light	Nintendo	June 4, 2014	Unreleased	Unreleased
Flying Dragon: The Secret Scroll	Culture Brain	September 10, 2014	July 7, 2016	March 5, 2015
Flying Warriors	Culture Brain	September 21, 2016	January 26, 2017	May 28, 2015
Formation Z	City Connection	March 29, 2017	Unreleased	Unreleased
Front Line	Square Enix	June 29, 2016	Unreleased	Unreleased
Galaga	Bandai Namco Entertainment	July 24, 2013	August 15, 2013	August 8, 2013
Ganbare Goemon 2	Konami	March 11, 2015	Unreleased	Unreleased
Ganbare Goemon Gaiden: Kieta Ōgon Kiseru	Konami	October 21, 2015	Unreleased	Unreleased
Ganbare Goemon Gaiden 2: Tenka no Zaihō	Konami	May 20, 2015	Unreleased	Unreleased
Ganbare Goemon! Karakuri Dōchū	Konami	July 2, 2014	Unreleased	Unreleased
Gargoyle's Quest II	Capcom	May 21, 2014	October 30, 2014	September 4, 2014
Getsu Fūma Den	Konami	April 8, 2015	Unreleased	Unreleased
Ghosts 'n Goblins	Capcom	July 3, 2013	May 30, 2013	May 30, 2013
Golf	Nintendo	November 13, 2013	October 10, 2013	October 10, 2013
Gomoku Narabe Renju	Nintendo	October 29, 2014	Unreleased	Unreleased
Gradius	Konami	October 2, 2013	January 9, 2014	September 26, 2013
Hanjuku Hero	Square Enix	April 9, 2014	Unreleased	Unreleased
Hogan's Alley	Nintendo	June 22, 2016	January 7, 2016	October 22, 2015
Ice Climber	Nintendo	April 27, 2013	April 26, 2013	April 27, 2013
Ice Hockey	Nintendo	December 11, 2013	February 20, 2014	February 20, 2014
Ike Ike! Nekketsu Hockey Bu: Subette Koronde Dairantō	Arc System Works	June 19, 2014	Unreleased	Unreleased
Ikki	Sunsoft	May 22, 2013	Unreleased	Unreleased
Joy Mech Fight	Nintendo	May 28, 2014	Unreleased	Unreleased
Kanshaku tamanage Kantarō no Tōkaidō Gojūsan-tsugi	Sunsoft	October 7, 2015	Unreleased	Unreleased
Kid Icarus	Nintendo	August 14, 2013	July 25, 2013	July 11, 2013
King's Knight	Square Enix	July 6, 2016	Unreleased	Unreleased
Kirby's Adventure	Nintendo	April 27, 2013	April 17, 2013	April 18, 2013
Kung Fu Heroes	Culture Brain	July 23, 2014	January 26, 2017	March 5, 2015
The Legend of Kage	Square Enix	June 4, 2014	Unreleased	Unreleased
The Legend of Zelda	Nintendo	August 28, 2013	August 29, 2013	August 29, 2013
Little Ninja Brothers	Culture Brain	October 19, 2016	January 26, 2017	May 28, 2015
Lode Runner	Konami	September 17, 2014	December 4, 2014	January 8, 2015
Mach Rider	Nintendo	October 1, 2014	May 1, 2014	August 7, 2014
MagMax	Hamster Corporation	September 14, 2016	Unreleased	Unreleased
Mappy	Bandai Namco Entertainment	May 15, 2013	Unreleased	Unreleased
Mappy-Land	Bandai Namco Entertainment	May 13, 2015	February 5, 2015	February 12, 2015
Mario Bros.	Nintendo	May 29, 2013	June 20, 2013	June 20, 2013
Mega Man	Capcom	June 12, 2013	May 2, 2013	May 2, 2013
Mega Man 2	Capcom	June 12, 2013	June 11, 2013	June 11, 2013
Mega Man 3	Capcom	May 1, 2013	June 11, 2013	June 11, 2013
Mega Man 4	Capcom	June 12, 2013	June 11, 2013	June 11, 2013
Mega Man 5	Capcom	April 23, 2014	August 7, 2014	July 24, 2014
Mega Man 6	Capcom	May 14, 2014	August 21, 2014	July 24, 2014
Metal Slader Glory	HAL Laboratory	July 1, 2015	Unreleased	Unreleased
Metro-Cross	Bandai Namco Entertainment	November 25, 2015	Unreleased	Unreleased
Metroid	Nintendo	August 14, 2013	July 11, 2013	July 11, 2013
Mighty Bomb Jack	Koei Tecmo	February 5, 2014	January 23, 2014	March 27, 2014
Mighty Final Fight	Capcom	February 10, 2015	November 27, 2014	December 18, 2014
The Mysterious Murasame Castle	Nintendo	July 30, 2014	Unreleased	Unreleased
NES Open Tournament Golf	Nintendo	January 15, 2014	March 6, 2014	February 6, 2014
Ninja Gaiden	Koei Tecmo	March 26, 2014	February 6, 2014	March 27, 2014
Ninja Gaiden II: The Dark Sword of Chaos	Koei Tecmo	Unreleased	February 18, 2016	November 26, 2015
Ninja Gaiden III: The Ancient Ship of Doom	Koei Tecmo	Unreleased	February 18, 2016	November 26, 2015
Ninja JaJaMaru-kun	Hamster Corporation	June 19, 2013	Unreleased	Unreleased
Nintendo World Cup	Arc System Works	March 19, 2014	Unreleased	Unreleased
Nuts & Milk	Konami	November 19, 2014	Unreleased	Unreleased
Pac-Land	Bandai Namco Entertainment	June 11, 2014	June 10, 2014	June 12, 2014
Pac-Man (Note: Delisted on April 28, 2017)	Bandai Namco Entertainment	May 15, 2013	May 2, 2013	May 2, 2013
Pinball	Nintendo	October 23, 2013	October 24, 2013	October 24, 2013
Pooyan	Konami	June 10, 2015	Unreleased	Unreleased
Princess Tomato in the Salad Kingdom	Konami	May 14, 2014	Unreleased	Unreleased
Punch-Out!!	Nintendo	June 5, 2013	March 20, 2013	April 27, 2013
Quinty (Note: Delisted on March 25, 2020)	Bandai Namco Entertainment	July 2, 2014	Unreleased	Unreleased
Renegade	Arc System Works	January 15, 2014	February 27, 2014	March 6, 2014
River City Ransom	Arc System Works	August 5, 2015	October 1, 2015	April 23, 2015
Salamander	Konami	October 8, 2014	August 21, 2014	September 18, 2014
S.C.A.T.	Natsume Inc.	Unreleased	January 22, 2015	December 4, 2014
Seicross	Hamster Corporation	July 1, 2015	Unreleased	Unreleased
Shadow of the Ninja	Natsume Inc.	Unreleased	January 29, 2015	December 4, 2014
Shin Onigashima	Nintendo	September 18, 2013	Unreleased	Unreleased
Sky Kid	Bandai Namco Entertainment	March 4, 2015	March 5, 2015	
Smash Ping Pong	Nintendo	March 18, 2015	Unreleased	Unreleased
Soccer	Nintendo	December 3, 2014	June 12, 2014	June 12, 2014
Solomon's Key	Koei Tecmo	May 1, 2013	May 9, 2013	May 9, 2013
Spelunker	Tozai Games	April 27, 2013	June 6, 2013	June 6, 2013
Star Luster	Bandai Namco Entertainment	November 4, 2015	Unreleased	Unreleased
StarTropics	Nintendo	Unreleased	May 26, 2016	September 3, 2015
Stinger	Konami	October 28, 2015	November 5, 2015	
Street Fighter 2010: The Final Fight	Capcom	October 15, 2014	January 15, 2015	December 18, 2014
Sugoro Quest: Dice no Senshi Tachi	Arc System Works	June 3, 2015	Unreleased	Unreleased
Super Contra	Konami	March 5, 2014	February 13, 2014	June 19, 2014
Super Dodge Ball	Arc System Works	December 18, 2013	June 18, 2014	March 13, 2014
Super Mario Bros.	Nintendo	June 5, 2013	September 19, 2013	September 12, 2013
Super Mario Bros. 2	Nintendo	March 19, 2014	May 16, 2013	May 16, 2013
Super Mario Bros. 3	Nintendo	December 25, 2013	April 17, 2014	December 26, 2013
Super Mario Bros.: The Lost Levels	Nintendo	August 8, 2013	March 13, 2014	January 23, 2014
Tatakai no Banka	Capcom	August 31, 2016	Unreleased	Unreleased
Tecmo Bowl	Koei Tecmo	Unreleased	September 10, 2015	September 17, 2015
Tennis	Nintendo	October 30, 2013	October 10, 2013	October 10, 2013
Tower of Babel	Bandai Namco Entertainment	October 22, 2014	Unreleased	Unreleased
The Tower of Druaga	Bandai Namco Entertainment	August 21, 2013	Unreleased	Unreleased
Tsuppari Ōzumō	Koei Tecmo	October 8, 2014	Unreleased	Unreleased
TwinBee	Konami	September 4, 2013	Unreleased	Unreleased
Ufouria: The Saga	Sunsoft	January 28, 2015	July 24, 2014	October 9, 2014
Urban Champion	Nintendo	October 23, 2013	October 17, 2013	October 17, 2013
Valkyrie no Bōken: Toki no Kagi Densetsu	Bandai Namco Entertainment	February 4, 2015	Unreleased	Unreleased
Volleyball	Nintendo	March 12, 2014	March 20, 2014	May 8, 2014
Vs. Excitebike	Nintendo	September 16, 2015	August 31, 2015	Unreleased
Wagan Land	Bandai Namco Entertainment	May 7, 2014	Unreleased	Unreleased
Wagyan Land 2	Bandai Namco Entertainment	November 11, 2015	Unreleased	Unreleased
Wai Wai World 2: SOS!! Parsley Jō	Konami	September 2, 2015	Unreleased	Unreleased
Wario's Woods	Nintendo	January 29, 2014	November 7, 2013	February 27, 2014
Wild Gunman	Nintendo	June 22, 2016	January 7, 2016	October 22, 2015
Wrecking Crew	Nintendo	June 19, 2013	June 20, 2013	June 20, 2013
Xevious	Bandai Namco Entertainment	April 27, 2013	May 9, 2013	May 9, 2013
Yie Ar Kung-Fu	Konami	September 17, 2014	Unreleased	May 9, 2013
Yokai Dochuki	Bandai Namco Entertainment	February 25, 2015	Unreleased	Unreleased
Yoshi	Nintendo	June 12, 2013	June 12, 2013	June 13, 2013
Zelda II: The Adventure of Link	Nintendo	September 11, 2013	September 12, 2013	September 26, 2013
Zoda's Revenge: StarTropics II	Nintendo	Unreleased	May 26, 2016	September 3, 2015

=== Super Nintendo Entertainment System ===
A total of 107 SNES games (Note: 101 games in Japan, 51 games in North America, 49 games in PAL regions) were available to purchase.

Title	Publisher	JP Release Date	NA Release Date	PAL Release Date
Albert Odyssey	Sunsoft	July 29, 2015	Unreleased	Unreleased
Axelay	Konami	February 25, 2015	February 19, 2015	January 15, 2015
Bahamut Lagoon	Square Enix	February 5, 2014	Unreleased	Unreleased
Bishōjo Janshi Suchie-Pai	City Connection	March 29, 2017	Unreleased	Unreleased
Brawl Brothers	Hamster Corporation	November 27, 2013	November 21, 2013	November 21, 2013
Breath of Fire	Capcom	September 10, 2014	February 12, 2015	November 27, 2014
Breath of Fire II	Capcom	July 10, 2013	September 5, 2013	September 5, 2013
Castlevania: Dracula X	Konami	April 23, 2014	October 2, 2014	November 13, 2014
Clock Tower	Sunsoft	November 6, 2013	Unreleased	Unreleased
Contra III: The Alien Wars	Konami	November 27, 2013	November 28, 2013	January 9, 2014
Cosmo Gang the Puzzle	Bandai Namco Entertainment	April 28, 2015	Unreleased	Unreleased
Cybernator	Konami	January 14, 2015	August 7, 2014	February 26, 2015
Darius Twin	Square Enix	October 12, 2016	Unreleased	Unreleased
Demon's Crest	Capcom	July 8, 2015	October 30, 2014	January 15, 2015
Donkey Kong Country	Nintendo	November 26, 2014	February 26, 2015	October 16, 2014
Donkey Kong Country 2: Diddy's Kong Quest	Nintendo	November 26, 2014	February 26, 2015	October 23, 2014
Donkey Kong Country 3: Dixie Kong's Double Trouble!	Nintendo	November 26, 2014	February 26, 2015	October 30, 2014
EarthBound	Nintendo	April 27, 2013	July 18, 2013	July 18, 2013
F-Zero	Nintendo	April 27, 2013	February 20, 2013	April 27, 2013
Famicom Bunko: Hajimari no Mori	Nintendo	August 21, 2013	Unreleased	Unreleased
Famicom Tantei Club Part II: Ushiro ni Tatsu Shōjo	Nintendo	July 31, 2013	Unreleased	Unreleased
Final Fantasy IV	Square Enix	February 19, 2014	Unreleased	Unreleased
Final Fantasy V	Square Enix	March 26, 2014	Unreleased	Unreleased
Final Fantasy VI	Square Enix	June 26, 2013	Unreleased	Unreleased
Final Fantasy Mystic Quest	Square Enix	April 16, 2014	Unreleased	Unreleased
Final Fight	Capcom	August 6, 2014	October 3, 2013	October 3, 2013
Final Fight 2	Capcom	August 27, 2014	October 3, 2013	October 3, 2013
Final Fight 3	Capcom	October 29, 2014	October 3, 2013	October 3, 2013
Fire Emblem: Monshō no Nazo	Nintendo	April 27, 2013	Unreleased	Unreleased
Fire Emblem: Seisen no Keifu	Nintendo	April 27, 2013	Unreleased	Unreleased
Fire Emblem: Thracia 776	Nintendo	July 10, 2013	Unreleased	Unreleased
Gakkou de atta Kowai Hanashi	Bandai Namco Entertainment	August 27, 2014	Unreleased	Unreleased
Ganbare Goemon 2: Kiteretsu Shōgun Magginesu	Konami	September 25, 2013	Unreleased	Unreleased
Ganbare Goemon 3: Shishijūrokubē no Karakuri Manji Gatame	Konami	October 16, 2013	Unreleased	Unreleased
Genghis Khan II: Clan of the Gray Wolf	Koei Tecmo	July 22, 2015	August 20, 2015	Unreleased
Harvest Moon	Natsume Inc.	Unreleased	August 1, 2013	August 1, 2013
Heisei Shin Onigashima (Zenpen)	Nintendo	September 24, 2014	Unreleased	Unreleased
Heisei Shin Onigashima (Kōhen)	Nintendo	September 24, 2014	Unreleased	Unreleased
Heracles no Eikō III: Kamigami no Chinmoku	Paon	May 22, 2013	Unreleased	Unreleased
Heracles no Eikō IV: Kamigami kara no Okurimono	Paon	February 10, 2015	Unreleased	Unreleased
The Ignition Factor	City Connection^{JP} Hamster Corporation^{US}	March 29, 2017	September 24, 2015	Unreleased
Kai: Tsukikomori	Bandai Namco Entertainment	September 7, 2016	Unreleased	Unreleased
Kamaitachi no Yoru	Spike Chunsoft	August 7, 2013	Unreleased	Unreleased
Kirby no Kirakira Kizzu	Nintendo	May 8, 2013	Unreleased	Unreleased
Kirby Super Star	Nintendo	May 1, 2013	May 23, 2013	May 23, 2013
Kirby's Dream Course	Nintendo	May 8, 2013	May 23, 2013	May 23, 2013
Kirby's Dream Land 3	Nintendo	May 8, 2013	May 23, 2013	July 25, 2013
Kunio-kun no Dodgeball da yo Zenin Shūgō!	Arc System Works	July 16, 2014	Unreleased	Unreleased
Last Bible III	Atlus	January 28, 2015	Unreleased	Unreleased
The Legend of the Mystical Ninja	Konami	September 4, 2013	December 5, 2013	January 16, 2014
The Legend of Zelda: A Link to the Past	Nintendo	February 12, 2014	January 30, 2014	December 12, 2013
Live A Live	Square Enix	June 24, 2015	Unreleased	Unreleased
Majin Tensei	Atlus	July 15, 2015	Unreleased	Unreleased
Majin Tensei II: Spiral Nemesis	Atlus	June 1, 2016	Unreleased	Unreleased
Mario's Super Picross	Nintendo	April 27, 2013	Unreleased	April 27, 2013
Marvelous: Mōhitotsu no Takarajima	Nintendo	February 12, 2014	Unreleased	Unreleased
Mega Man 7	Capcom	August 6, 2014	September 12, 2014	November 6, 2014
Mega Man X	Capcom	May 22, 2013	May 30, 2013	September 19, 2013
Mega Man X2	Capcom	October 9, 2013	January 2, 2014	November 14, 2013
Mega Man X3	Capcom	October 8, 2014	August 28, 2014	November 6, 2014
Metal Marines	Bandai Namco Entertainment	March 4, 2015	May 7, 2015	Unreleased
Metal Slader Glory: Director's Cut	Nintendo	December 9, 2015	Unreleased	Unreleased
Natsume Championship Wrestling	Natsume Inc.	Unreleased	December 18, 2014	November 20, 2014
Nobunaga's Ambition	Koei Tecmo	October 29, 2014	September 4, 2014	September 25, 2014
Ogre Battle: The March of the Black Queen	Square Enix	November 20, 2013	Unreleased	Unreleased
Otogirisō	Spike Chunsoft	July 30, 2014	Unreleased	Unreleased
Pac-Attack	Bandai Namco Entertainment	Unreleased	June 4, 2015	February 26, 2015
Pac-Man 2: The New Adventures	Bandai Namco Entertainment	Unreleased	March 3, 2016	October 8, 2015
Panel de Pon	Nintendo	May 29, 2013	Unreleased	Unreleased
Pilotwings	Nintendo	May 29, 2013	July 4, 2013	July 4, 2013
Pop'n TwinBee	Konami	May 7, 2014	Unreleased	July 10, 2014
Pop'n TwinBee: Rainbow Bell Adventures	Konami	May 21, 2014	Unreleased	July 31, 2014
Power Instinct	Atlus	November 11, 2015	Unreleased	Unreleased
Rival Turf!	Hamster Corporation	September 30, 2015	May 28, 2015	Unreleased
Romance of the Three Kingdoms IV: Wall of Fire	Koei Tecmo	July 24, 2013	August 8, 2013	August 8, 2013
Romancing SaGa	Square Enix	December 18, 2013	Unreleased	Unreleased
Romancing SaGa 2	Square Enix	January 22, 2014	Unreleased	Unreleased
Romancing SaGa 3	Square Enix	February 26, 2014	Unreleased	Unreleased
Secret of Mana	Square Enix	June 26, 2013	Unreleased	Unreleased
Shin Megami Tensei	Atlus	July 3, 2013	Unreleased	Unreleased
Shin Megami Tensei II	Atlus	September 25, 2013	Unreleased	Unreleased
Shin Megami Tensei if...	Atlus	October 16, 2013	Unreleased	Unreleased
Space Invaders: The Original Game	Square Enix	October 12, 2016	Unreleased	Unreleased
Street Fighter II: The World Warrior	Capcom	June 25, 2014	August 22, 2013	August 22, 2013
Street Fighter II Turbo: Hyper Fighting	Capcom	June 25, 2014	August 22, 2013	August 22, 2013
Street Fighter Alpha 2	Capcom	August 20, 2014	May 22, 2014	October 2, 2014
Super Castlevania IV	Konami	September 11, 2013	October 31, 2013	October 31, 2013
Super Chinese World	Culture Brain	October 1, 2014	Unreleased	Unreleased
Super E.D.F.: Earth Defense Force	Hamster Corporation	August 26, 2015	May 21, 2015	Unreleased
Super Famicom Wars	Nintendo	October 2, 2013	Unreleased	Unreleased
Super Ghouls 'n Ghosts	Capcom	April 27, 2013	May 16, 2013	May 16, 2013
Super Gussun Oyoyo (Note: Delisted on September 30, 2016)	Bandai Namco Entertainment	August 19, 2015	Unreleased	Unreleased
Super Mario Kart	Nintendo	June 19, 2013	August 6, 2014	March 27, 2014
Super Mario RPG	Nintendo	August 5, 2015	June 30, 2016	December 24, 2015
Super Mario World	Nintendo	April 27, 2013	April 26, 2013	April 27, 2013
Super Metroid	Nintendo	May 15, 2013	May 15, 2013	May 16, 2013
Super Punch-Out!!	Nintendo	April 9, 2014	December 26, 2013	June 12, 2014
Super Street Fighter II	Capcom	June 25, 2014	August 22, 2013	August 22, 2013
Super Wagan Land	Bandai Namco Entertainment	September 18, 2013	Unreleased	Unreleased
Sutte Hakkun	Nintendo	February 4, 2015	Unreleased	Unreleased
Tactics Ogre: Let Us Cling Together	Square Enix	March 12, 2014	Unreleased	Unreleased
Taikō Risshiden	Koei Tecmo	May 20, 2015	Unreleased	Unreleased
Treasure of the Rudras	Square Enix	December 2, 2015	Unreleased	Unreleased
Uncharted Waters: New Horizons	Koei Tecmo	October 30, 2013	November 14, 2013	November 28, 2013
Vegas Stakes	Nintendo	Unreleased	June 27, 2013	June 27, 2013
Wild Guns	Natsume Inc.	Unreleased	September 18, 2014	November 20, 2014
Wrecking Crew '98	Nintendo	September 28, 2016	September 18, 2014	November 20, 2014

=== Nintendo 64 ===
A total of 22 N64 games (Note: 22 games in Japan, 21 games in North America and PAL regions) were available to purchase.

Title	Publisher	JP Release Date	NA Release Date	PAL Release Date
1080° Snowboarding	Nintendo	January 20, 2016	December 31, 2015	December 31, 2015
Bomberman 64	Konami	June 28, 2017	March 9, 2017	March 9, 2017
Custom Robo V2	Nintendo	June 8, 2016	Unreleased	Unreleased
Donkey Kong 64	Nintendo	April 2, 2015	April 16, 2015	April 2, 2015
Excitebike 64	Nintendo	June 21, 2017	November 17, 2016	December 8, 2016
F-Zero X	Nintendo	November 2, 2016	January 12, 2017	November 3, 2016
Harvest Moon 64	Marvelous Entertainment^{JP} Natsume Inc.^{NA/PAL}	July 5, 2017	February 23, 2017	February 23, 2017
Kirby 64: The Crystal Shards	Nintendo	August 19, 2015	July 30, 2015	June 25, 2015
The Legend of Zelda: Majora's Mask	Nintendo	June 29, 2016	November 24, 2016	June 23, 2016
The Legend of Zelda: Ocarina of Time	Nintendo	December 22, 2015	July 2, 2015	July 2, 2015
Mario Golf	Nintendo	September 2, 2015	September 3, 2015	October 8, 2015
Mario Kart 64	Nintendo	January 6, 2016	December 29, 2016	January 21, 2016
Mario Party 2	Nintendo	March 30, 2016	December 22, 2016	April 21, 2016
Mario Tennis	Nintendo	July 20, 2016	July 9, 2015	December 17, 2015 (Note: Initially available via a free download code for purchasing Mario Tennis: Ultra Smash from the Nintendo eShop between November 20 and December 17, 2015.)
Ogre Battle 64: Person of Lordly Caliber	Nintendo	July 5, 2017	February 16, 2017	February 9, 2017
Paper Mario	Nintendo	July 15, 2015	April 30, 2015	May 21, 2015
Pokémon Snap	Nintendo	April 6, 2016	January 5, 2017	August 18, 2016
Sin and Punishment	Nintendo	April 27, 2016	August 27, 2015	September 3, 2015
Star Fox 64	Nintendo	August 31, 2016	January 19, 2017	March 24, 2016
Super Mario 64	Nintendo	April 8, 2015	April 1, 2015	April 2, 2015
Wave Race 64	Nintendo	July 13, 2016	August 11, 2016	December 31, 2015
Yoshi's Story	Nintendo	February 17, 2016	March 24, 2016	April 14, 2016

=== Game Boy Advance ===
A total of 110 GBA games (Note: 102 games in Japan, 74 games in North America, 70 games in PAL regions) were available to purchase.

Title	Publisher	JP Release Date	NA Release Date	PAL Release Date
Advance Wars	Nintendo	April 3, 2014	April 3, 2014	April 3, 2014
Advance Wars 2: Black Hole Rising	Nintendo	April 3, 2014	August 20, 2015	July 2, 2015
Car Battler Joe	Natsume Inc.	Unreleased	September 17, 2015	Unreleased
Castlevania: Aria of Sorrow	Konami	August 26, 2015	October 23, 2014	March 19, 2015
Castlevania: Circle of the Moon	Konami	August 27, 2014	October 9, 2014	January 29, 2015
Castlevania: Harmony of Dissonance	Konami	January 21, 2015	October 16, 2014	February 19, 2015
Chocobo Land: A Game of Dice	Square Enix	February 10, 2016	Unreleased	Unreleased
ChuChu Rocket!	Sega	October 21, 2015	Unreleased	Unreleased
Contra Advance: The Alien Wars EX	Konami	March 9, 2016	November 12, 2015	November 5, 2015
Densetsu no Starfy	Nintendo	July 29, 2015	Unreleased	Unreleased
Densetsu no Starfy 2	Nintendo	March 16, 2016	Unreleased	Unreleased
Densetsu no Starfy 3	Nintendo	April 6, 2016	Unreleased	Unreleased
DK King of Swing	Nintendo	November 19, 2014	November 20, 2014	January 22, 2015
Drill Dozer	Nintendo	December 16, 2015	June 16, 2016	January 7, 2016
F-Zero Climax	Nintendo	December 16, 2015	Unreleased	Unreleased
F-Zero: GP Legend	Nintendo	October 1, 2014	March 12, 2015	January 1, 2015
F-Zero: Maximum Velocity	Nintendo	April 3, 2014	April 17, 2014	April 17, 2014
Family Tennis Advance	Bandai Namco Entertainment	May 27, 2015	Unreleased	Unreleased
Final Fantasy I & II Advance	Square Enix	January 6, 2016	Unreleased	Unreleased
Final Fantasy IV Advance	Square Enix	April 13, 2016	Unreleased	Unreleased
Final Fantasy V Advance	Square Enix	April 20, 2016	Unreleased	Unreleased
Final Fantasy VI Advance	Square Enix	December 22, 2015	Unreleased	Unreleased
Final Fantasy Tactics Advance	Square Enix	March 30, 2016	January 28, 2016	January 28, 2016
Final Fight One	Capcom	July 29, 2015	October 15, 2015	July 16, 2015
Fire Emblem	Nintendo	May 14, 2014	December 4, 2014	August 21, 2014
Fire Emblem: Fūin no Tsurugi	Nintendo	September 2, 2015	Unreleased	Unreleased
Fire Emblem: The Sacred Stones	Nintendo	August 6, 2014	June 18, 2015	January 1, 2015
Game & Watch Gallery 4	Nintendo	March 16, 2016	April 7, 2016	December 10, 2015
Golden Sun	Nintendo	April 3, 2014	April 17, 2014	April 17, 2014
Golden Sun: The Lost Age	Nintendo	July 23, 2014	August 6, 2015	November 13, 2014
Granbo	Capcom	June 1, 2016	Unreleased	Unreleased
Gyakuten Saiban	Capcom	November 4, 2015	Unreleased	Unreleased
Gyakuten Saiban 2	Capcom	December 2, 2015	Unreleased	Unreleased
Gyakuten Saiban 3	Capcom	March 2, 2016	Unreleased	Unreleased
Harvest Moon: Friends of Mineral Town	Natsume Inc.	Unreleased	June 11, 2015	Unreleased
Harvest Moon: More Friends of Mineral Town	Natsume Inc.	Unreleased	October 29, 2015	Unreleased
Kawa no Nushi Tsuri 3 & 4	Marvelous	May 11, 2016	Unreleased	Unreleased
Kawa no Nushi Tsuri 5: Fushigi no Mori kara	Marvelous	July 6, 2016	Unreleased	Unreleased
Kirby & the Amazing Mirror	Nintendo	April 3, 2014	April 10, 2014	April 10, 2014
Kirby: Nightmare in Dream Land	Nintendo	April 30, 2014	October 30, 2014	July 17, 2014
Klonoa: Empire of Dreams	Bandai Namco Entertainment	September 3, 2014	May 29, 2014	May 22, 2014
Klonoa 2: Dream Champ Tournament	Bandai Namco Entertainment	January 20, 2016	March 19, 2015	Unreleased
Konami Krazy Racers	Konami	February 3, 2016	November 26, 2015	October 15, 2015
Kotoba no Puzzle: Mojipittan Advance	Bandai Namco Entertainment	March 18, 2015	Unreleased	Unreleased
Kuru Kuru Kururin	Nintendo	July 16, 2014	February 11, 2016	December 25, 2014
Kururin Paradise	Nintendo	December 9, 2015	Unreleased	Unreleased
The Legend of Zelda: The Minish Cap	Nintendo	April 30, 2014	June 5, 2014	May 29, 2014
Lufia: The Ruins of Lore	Square Enix	August 17, 2016	Unreleased	Unreleased
Magical Vacation	Nintendo	August 19, 2015	Unreleased	Unreleased
Mario & Luigi: Superstar Saga	Nintendo	April 30, 2014	April 3, 2014	April 3, 2014
Mario Golf: Advance Tour	Nintendo	September 10, 2014	September 25, 2014	August 28, 2014
Mario Kart: Super Circuit	Nintendo	July 22, 2015	November 13, 2014	April 23, 2015
Mario Party Advance	Nintendo	October 28, 2015	December 25, 2014	December 25, 2014
Mario Pinball Land	Nintendo	September 17, 2014	November 27, 2014	September 11, 2014
Mario Tennis: Power Tour	Nintendo	April 30, 2014	July 3, 2014	June 26, 2014
Mario vs. Donkey Kong	Nintendo	July 23, 2014	February 9, 2017	September 17, 2015
Medabots AX: Metabee	Natsume Inc.	Unreleased	February 25, 2016	November 5, 2015
Medabots AX: Rokusho	Natsume Inc.	Unreleased	February 25, 2016	November 5, 2015
Medabots: Metabee	Natsume Inc.^{NA/PAL} Rocket Company^{JP}	January 27, 2016	December 10, 2015	October 1, 2015
Medabots: Rokusho	Natsume Inc.^{NA/PAL} Rocket Company^{JP}	January 27, 2016	December 10, 2015	October 1, 2015
Medarot G: Kabuto Version	Rocket Company	October 14, 2015	Unreleased	Unreleased
Medarot G: Kuwagata Version	Rocket Company	October 14, 2015	Unreleased	Unreleased
Medarot Navi: Kabuto Version	Rocket Company	June 15, 2016	Unreleased	Unreleased
Medarot Navi: Kuwagata Version	Rocket Company	June 15, 2016	Unreleased	Unreleased
Mega Man & Bass	Capcom	February 18, 2015	May 7, 2015	August 13, 2015
Mega Man Battle Chip Challenge	Capcom	July 30, 2014	August 14, 2014	August 7, 2014
Mega Man Battle Network	Capcom	July 9, 2014	July 31, 2014	July 24, 2014
Mega Man Battle Network 2	Capcom	November 12, 2014	January 8, 2015	May 14, 2015
Mega Man Battle Network 3: Blue	Capcom	December 17, 2014	May 14, 2015	June 11, 2015
Mega Man Battle Network 3: White	Capcom	December 17, 2014	May 14, 2015	June 11, 2015
Mega Man Battle Network 4: Blue Moon	Capcom	March 25, 2015	May 28, 2015	July 9, 2015
Mega Man Battle Network 4: Red Sun	Capcom	March 25, 2015	May 28, 2015	July 9, 2015
Mega Man Battle Network 5: Team Colonel	Capcom	September 9, 2015	December 17, 2015	November 5, 2015
Mega Man Battle Network 5: Team ProtoMan	Capcom	September 9, 2015	December 17, 2015	November 5, 2015
Mega Man Battle Network 6: Cybeast Falzar	Capcom	November 18, 2015	March 10, 2016	January 14, 2016
Mega Man Battle Network 6: Cybeast Gregar	Capcom	November 18, 2015	March 10, 2016	January 14, 2016
Mega Man Zero	Capcom	October 22, 2014	December 17, 2014	December 25, 2014
Mega Man Zero 2	Capcom	January 7, 2015	May 21, 2015	February 5, 2015
Mega Man Zero 3	Capcom	May 13, 2015	May 28, 2015	March 26, 2015
Mega Man Zero 4	Capcom	June 3, 2015	December 17, 2015	May 14, 2015
Metroid Fusion	Nintendo	April 30, 2014	April 3, 2014	April 3, 2014
Metroid: Zero Mission	Nintendo	June 19, 2014	January 14, 2016	March 12, 2015
Mother 3	Nintendo	December 17, 2015	Unreleased	Unreleased
Mr. Driller 2	Bandai Namco Entertainment	August 20, 2014	July 17, 2014	May 15, 2014
Mr. Driller A	Bandai Namco Entertainment	March 11, 2015	Unreleased	Unreleased
Namco Museum	Bandai Namco Entertainment	December 10, 2014	March 26, 2015	October 23, 2014
Napoleon	Nintendo	January 7, 2015	Unreleased	Unreleased
Onimusha Tactics	Capcom	February 24, 2016	August 6, 2015	December 17, 2015
Pac-Man Collection (Note: Delisted on April 28, 2017)	Bandai Namco Entertainment	June 11, 2014	June 10, 2014	June 12, 2014
Pocky & Rocky with Becky	Natsume Inc.	Unreleased	October 8, 2015	October 8, 2015
Pokémon Mystery Dungeon: Red Rescue Team	Nintendo^{NA/PAL} The Pokémon Company^{JP}	March 23, 2016	June 23, 2016	February 11, 2016
Pokémon Pinball: Ruby & Sapphire	Nintendo^{NA/PAL} The Pokémon Company^{JP}	December 10, 2014	January 1, 2015	December 11, 2014
Polarium Advance	Nintendo	January 13, 2016	February 11, 2016	December 10, 2015
Rayman 3: Hoodlum Havoc	Ubisoft	Unreleased	April 20, 2017	May 25, 2017
Rayman Advance	Ubisoft	Unreleased	April 20, 2017	May 25, 2017
Rockman EXE 4.5 Real Operation	Capcom	January 13, 2016	Unreleased	Unreleased
Sennen Kazoku	Nintendo	June 8, 2016	Unreleased	Unreleased
Shining Force: Resurrection of the Dark Dragon	Sega	May 18, 2016	Unreleased	Unreleased
Shining Soul	Sega	February 17, 2016	Unreleased	Unreleased
Shining Soul II	Sega	March 9, 2016	Unreleased	Unreleased
Sonic Advance	Sega	February 18, 2015	Unreleased	Unreleased
Sonic Advance 2	Sega	February 24, 2016	Unreleased	Unreleased
Sonic Advance 3	Sega	May 25, 2016	Unreleased	Unreleased
Super Ghouls 'n Ghosts	Capcom	January 14, 2015	October 22, 2015	February 19, 2015
Super Mario Advance	Nintendo	July 16, 2014	November 6, 2014	March 10, 2016
Super Mario Advance 4: Super Mario Bros. 3	Nintendo	December 29, 2015	January 21, 2016	March 10, 2016
Super Mario World: Super Mario Advance 2	Nintendo	April 3, 2014	December 25, 2014	March 10, 2016
Super Street Fighter II Turbo Revival	Capcom	July 1, 2015	November 19, 2015	July 16, 2015
Tomato Adventure	Nintendo	August 26, 2015	Unreleased	Unreleased
Wario Land 4	Nintendo	April 30, 2014	May 8, 2014	June 5, 2014
WarioWare, Inc.: Mega Microgames!	Nintendo	April 3, 2014	April 10, 2014	April 10, 2014
Yoshi's Island: Super Mario Advance 3	Nintendo	October 15, 2014	April 24, 2014	April 24, 2014

=== Nintendo DS ===
A total of 31 Nintendo DS games were available to purchase, all of which were available across all regions.

Title	Publisher	JP Release Date	NA Release Date	PAL Release Date
Advance Wars: Dual Strike	Nintendo	April 20, 2016	December 1, 2016	March 3, 2016
Animal Crossing: Wild World	Nintendo	July 27, 2016	October 13, 2016	November 19, 2015
Big Brain Academy	Nintendo	April 2, 2015	February 11, 2016	June 4, 2015
Brain Age: Train Your Brain in Minutes a Day!	Nintendo	August 5, 2015 (Note: Initially available as a free download between June 4 and June 30, 2014.)	April 14, 2016 (Note: Initially available as a free download between June 13 and July 10, 2014.)	June 25, 2015
DK: Jungle Climber	Nintendo	July 8, 2015	July 23, 2015	August 6, 2015
Fire Emblem: Shadow Dragon	Nintendo	February 10, 2016	December 8, 2016	July 2, 2015
Kirby: Canvas Curse	Nintendo	February 3, 2016	October 13, 2016	December 3, 2015
Kirby Mass Attack	Nintendo	March 2, 2016	July 28, 2016	December 3, 2015
Kirby: Squeak Squad	Nintendo	September 9, 2015	July 30, 2015	June 25, 2015
The Legend of Zelda: Phantom Hourglass	Nintendo	August 3, 2016	May 12, 2016	November 13, 2015
The Legend of Zelda: Spirit Tracks	Nintendo	August 9, 2016	October 20, 2016	November 13, 2015
Mario & Luigi: Partners in Time	Nintendo	June 10, 2015	June 25, 2015	July 16, 2015
Mario Hoops 3-on-3	Nintendo	May 11, 2016	November 3, 2016	May 26, 2016
Mario Kart DS	Nintendo	May 25, 2016	April 23, 2015	April 2, 2015
Mario Party DS	Nintendo	April 27, 2016	April 21, 2016	April 21, 2016
Mario vs. Donkey Kong 2: March of the Minis	Nintendo	August 17, 2016	October 6, 2016	September 17, 2015
Metroid Prime Hunters	Nintendo	September 30, 2015	June 2, 2016	September 15, 2016
New Super Mario Bros.	Nintendo	April 2, 2015	May 14, 2015	December 17, 2015
Picross 3D	Nintendo	October 19, 2016	March 16, 2017	September 1, 2016
Pokémon Mystery Dungeon Blue Rescue Team	Nintendo^{NA/PAL} The Pokémon Company^{JP}	March 23, 2016	June 23, 2016	February 11, 2016
Pokémon Mystery Dungeon: Explorers of Sky	Nintendo^{NA/PAL} The Pokémon Company^{JP}	July 20, 2016	June 23, 2016	August 18, 2016
Pokémon Ranger	Nintendo^{NA/PAL} The Pokémon Company^{JP}	April 13, 2016	July 21, 2016	February 25, 2016
Pokémon Ranger: Guardian Signs	Nintendo^{NA/PAL} The Pokémon Company^{JP}	August 3, 2016	August 18, 2016	June 9, 2016
Pokémon Ranger: Shadows of Almia	Nintendo^{NA/PAL} The Pokémon Company^{JP}	July 27, 2016	August 4, 2016	June 9, 2016
Star Fox Command	Nintendo	September 28, 2016	June 25, 2015	August 6, 2015
Style Savvy	Nintendo	July 13, 2016	May 5, 2016	June 23, 2016
Super Mario 64 DS	Nintendo	January 6, 2016	August 25, 2016	December 24, 2015
Wario: Master of Disguise	Nintendo	October 7, 2015	June 9, 2016	August 20, 2015
WarioWare: Touched!	Nintendo	April 15, 2015	April 9, 2015	April 2, 2015
Yoshi Touch & Go	Nintendo	May 18, 2016	April 9, 2015	July 23, 2015 (Note: Initially available via a free download code for purchasing Yoshi's Woolly World from the Nintendo eShop between June 25 (AU) / 26 (EU) and July 23, 2015.)
Yoshi's Island DS	Nintendo	April 8, 2015	April 1, 2015	May 7, 2015

=== TurboGrafx-16 ===
A total of 52 TurboGrafx-16 games (Note: 52 games in Japan, 40 games in North America and PAL regions) were available to purchase. This list includes games originally released for the TurboGrafx-CD add-on.

Title	Publisher	JP Release Date	NA Release Date	PAL Release Date
Ai Cho Aniki (Note: TurboGrafx-CD game)	Konami	April 20, 2016	Unreleased	Unreleased
Air Zonk	Konami	June 19, 2014	July 27, 2017	August 3, 2017
Alien Crush	Konami	July 9, 2014	June 8, 2017	June 29, 2017
Battle Chopper (Note: Delisted on June 30, 2020)	Konami	April 15, 2015	February 1, 2018	February 1, 2018
Battle Lode Runner	Konami	December 21, 2016	November 30, 2017	December 14, 2017
Blazing Lazers	Konami	June 11, 2014	May 18, 2017	June 8, 2017
Bomberman '93	Konami	December 28, 2016	November 30, 2017	December 14, 2017
Bomberman '94	Konami	November 19, 2014	February 2, 2017	February 2, 2017
Bomberman: Panic Bomber	Konami	September 16, 2015	November 23, 2017	December 7, 2017
Bonk 3: Bonk's Big Adventure	Konami	June 25, 2014	June 29, 2017	August 3, 2017
Bonk's Adventure	Konami	December 25, 2013	July 14, 2016	July 28, 2016
Bonk's Revenge	Konami	March 12, 2014	May 4, 2017	June 1, 2017
Break In	Konami	January 21, 2015	November 16, 2017	November 30, 2017
Chew Man Fu	Konami	July 30, 2014	September 21, 2017	September 28, 2017
China Warrior	Konami	April 30, 2014	September 7, 2017	September 28, 2017
Cho Aniki	Konami	March 23, 2016	Unreleased	Unreleased
Detana!! TwinBee	Konami	November 26, 2014	September 7, 2017	September 21, 2017
Devil's Crush	Konami	March 18, 2015	June 29, 2017	July 13, 2017
Digital Champ: Battle Boxing	Konami	December 17, 2014	October 12, 2017	November 9, 2017
Double Dungeons	Konami	February 10, 2015	September 28, 2017	October 5, 2017
Dragon Egg!	Konami	April 26, 2017	Unreleased	Unreleased
Dungeon Explorer	Konami	July 22, 2015	March 2, 2017	March 16, 2017
Final Soldier	Konami	August 27, 2014	August 10, 2017	August 24, 2017
Gai Flame	Konami	February 24, 2016	Unreleased	Unreleased
Gaia no Monshō	Konami	April 19, 2017	Unreleased	Unreleased
Gradius	Konami	April 16, 2014	February 2, 2017	February 2, 2017
Hisou Kihei X-Serd	Konami	April 26, 2017	Unreleased	Unreleased
Image Fight	Konami	June 24, 2015	February 8, 2018	February 1, 2018
Image Fight II	Konami	November 25, 2015	February 8, 2018	February 1, 2018
Jaseiken Necromancer	Konami	March 29, 2017	February 1, 2018	February 1, 2018
Kaizō Chōjin Shubibinman	Konami	December 16, 2015	Unreleased	Unreleased
Kaizō Chōjin Shubibinman 3: Ikai no Princess	Konami	September 28, 2016	Unreleased	Unreleased
Langrisser: The Descendants of Light'	Konami	March 29, 2017	Unreleased	Unreleased
Legend of Hero Tonma	Konami	March 18, 2015	October 12, 2017	October 12, 2017
Lords of Thunder	Konami	October 21, 2015	November 9, 2017	December 14, 2017
Moto Roader	Konami	December 17, 2014	October 12, 2017	October 12, 2017
Moto Roader II	Konami	April 19, 2017	Unreleased	Unreleased
Moto Roader MC	Konami	April 26, 2017	Unreleased	Unreleased
Neutopia	Konami	April 16, 2014	March 2, 2017	March 16, 2017
Neutopia II	Konami	July 30, 2014	June 8, 2017	June 29, 2017
New Adventure Island	Konami	January 29, 2014	July 14, 2016	July 28, 2016
Ninja Spirit	Konami	January 14, 2015	July 27, 2017	August 10, 2017
Power Golf	Konami	October 22, 2014	November 2, 2017	November 30, 2017
R-Type	Konami	April 30, 2014	July 14, 2016	July 28, 2016
Salamander	Konami	October 22, 2014	November 16, 2017	December 7, 2017
Shockman	Konami	August 27, 2014	September 21, 2017	September 28, 2017
Soldier Blade	Konami	September 24, 2014	August 10, 2017	August 24, 2017
Super Star Soldier	Konami	February 26, 2014	April 6, 2017	May 18, 2017
Victory Run	Konami	September 17, 2014	July 27, 2017	August 10, 2017
Vigilante	Konami	February 10, 2015	September 14, 2017	October 5, 2017
Wallaby!! Usagi no Kuni no Kangaroo Race	Konami	January 27, 2016	Unreleased	Unreleased
World Sports Competition	Konami	April 15, 2015	April 6, 2017	April 6, 2017

=== MSX ===
A total of 23 MSX and MSX2 games were available to purchase. These games were not released outside of Japan.

Title	Publisher	JP Release Date
Akumajō Dracula (Note: MSX2 game)	Konami	December 17, 2014
Circus Charlie	Konami	June 24, 2015
Contra	Konami	October 15, 2014
Ganbare Goemon! Karakuri Dōchū	Konami	February 25, 2015
Gofer no Yabō: Episode II	Konami	April 15, 2015
Hyper Sports 2	Konami	October 28, 2015
Kekkyoku Nankyoku Daibōken: Antarctic Adventure	Konami	November 19, 2014
Konami's Soccer	Konami	November 25, 2015
Magical Tree	Konami	August 19, 2015
Majō Densetsu	Konami	March 19, 2014
Nemesis	Konami	September 30, 2015
Nemesis 2	Konami	May 25, 2016
Parodius: Tako wa Chikyū wo Sukū	Konami	December 25, 2013
Quarth	Konami	April 23, 2014
Road Fighter	Konami	June 19, 2014
Salamander	Konami	July 20, 2016
Sky Jaguar	Konami	May 20, 2015
Space Manbow	Konami	February 19, 2014
The Treasure of Uşas	Konami	August 24, 2016
TwinBee	Konami	March 18, 2015
Yie Ar Kung-Fu	Konami	January 14, 2015
Yie-Gah-kōtei no Gyakushū: Yie Ar Kung-Fu 2	Konami	May 21, 2014
Yumetairiku Adventure	Konami	January 29, 2014

== See also ==
- List of Virtual Console games for Wii
- List of Virtual Console games for Nintendo 3DS
- List of Wii games on Wii U eShop
