= List of PlayStation Store TurboGrafx-16 games =

This is a list of downloadable TurboGrafx-16 (PC Engine) games to be purchased from the PlayStation Store for Sony's PlayStation 3 (PS3), PlayStation Portable (PSP) and PlayStation Vita (PSV) video game consoles.

A red cell indicates that the title is no longer available to purchase on the PlayStation Store.

There are 48 games on this list.

Title	Developer	North America	Japan
Aldynes	Produce	Unreleased	February 16, 2011
Alien Crush	Compile	May 17, 2011	February 17, 2010
Battle Ace	Hudson Soft	Unreleased	April 21, 2010
Benkei Gaiden	Sunsoft	Unreleased	December 15, 2010
Blazing Lazers	Compile	Unreleased	July 21, 2010
Bomberman '94	Hudson Soft	April 26, 2011	July 15, 2009
Bonk's Adventure	Red Company, Atlus	May 17, 2011	November 18, 2009
Chiki Chiki Boys	NEC Avenue	Unreleased	April 20, 2011
Cho Aniki	Masaya	Unreleased	December 15, 2010
Dai Makaimura	Hudson Soft	Unreleased	August 18, 2010
Detana!! TwinBee	Konami	Unreleased	June 16, 2010
Devil's Crush	Naxat Soft	Unreleased	July 15, 2009
Double Dungeons	NCS Corporation	Unreleased	November 17, 2010
Dungeon Explorer	Atlus	May 31, 2011	October 21, 2009
Dungeon Explorer II	Hudson Soft	Unreleased	September 15, 2010
Galaga '88	Namco	Unreleased	March 17, 2011
Gate of Thunder	Red Company	Unreleased	March 17, 2010
Gradius	Konami	Unreleased	June 16, 2010
Gradius II: Gofer no Yabou	Konami	Unreleased	October 20, 2010
Jaseiken Necromancer	Hudson Soft	Unreleased	December 16, 2009
Kaizou Choujin Schbibinman 2: Arata Naru Teki	NCS Corporation	Unreleased	February 16, 2011
Kaizou Chounin Shubibinman	NCS Corporation	Unreleased	January 19, 2011
Kaizō Chōjin Shubibinman 3: Ikai no Princess	NCS Corporation	Unreleased	April 20, 2011
Langrisser	NCS Corporation	Unreleased	February 16, 2011
Moto Roader II	NCS Corporation	Unreleased	January 19, 2011
Neutopia	Hudson Soft	April 19, 2011	June 16, 2010
Neutopia II	Hudson Soft	Unreleased	July 21, 2010
New Adventure Island	Now Production	June 7, 2011	July 15, 2009
PC Genjin 2	Red Company, Mutech	Unreleased	November 18, 2009
PC Genjin 3	A.I. Company Ltd.	Unreleased	January 20, 2010
Power League 4	Hudson Soft	Unreleased	September 16, 2009
R-Type	Hudson Soft	Unreleased	April 20, 2011
Salamander	Konami	Unreleased	July 21, 2010
Sengoku Mahjong	Hudson Soft	Unreleased	July 15, 2009
Soldier Blade	Hudson Soft	June 7, 2011	February 17, 2010
Splatterhouse	Namco	Unreleased	July 6, 2011
Super Star Soldier	Kaneko	May 31, 2011	August 19, 2009
Tengai Makyō: Ziria	Red Company	Unreleased	October 20, 2010
Tengai Makyou II: Manjimaru	Red Company	Unreleased	March 17, 2011
The Kung Fu	Hudson Soft	Unreleased	January 20, 2010
Valis: The Fantasm Soldier	Telenet Japan	Unreleased	December 15, 2010
Valis II	Telenet Japan	Unreleased	March 17, 2011
Victory Run	Hudson Soft	May 31, 2011	April 21, 2010
Winds of Thunder	Red Company	Unreleased	August 18, 2010
World Sports Competition	Hudson Soft	May 31, 2011	December 16, 2009
Ys I & II	Alfa System	Unreleased	November 17, 2010
Ys III: Wanderers from Ys	Alfa System	Unreleased	February 16, 2011
Ys IV: The Dawn of Ys	Hudson Soft	Unreleased	July 6, 2011

== See also ==
- Lists of downloadable PlayStation games
- List of downloadable PlayStation 2 games
- List of DSiWare games and applications
- List of WiiWare games
