= TurboGrafx-16 Mini =

Home video game console by Konami

Turbo Grafx-16 Mini
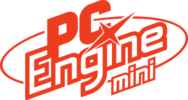
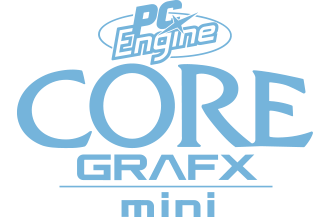
- Also known as: PC Engine Mini (PCエンジン mini, Pī Shī Enjin mini), PC Engine CoreGrafx Mini
- Developer: Konami, M2
- Manufacturer: Konami
- Type: Dedicated console
- Released: JP: March 19, 2020; NA: May 22, 2020; EU: June 5, 2020
- Lifespan: 2020
- Introductory price: US$100 €99.99 £99 ¥10,500
- Controller input: 2 USB controller ports (up to five through a new Multi Tap)
- Power: USB Micro-B
- Dimensions: 240 mm x 156 mm x 35 mm (TG-16 Mini); 120 mm × 115 mm × 35 mm (PCE Mini, PCE CoreGrafx Mini)

The TurboGrafx-16 Mini, also known as the PC Engine Mini (PCエンジン mini, Pī Shī Enjin mini) in Japan and PC Engine CoreGrafx Mini in Europe, is a dedicated home video game console modeled on NEC's TurboGrafx-16, released in 2020. It is developed by Konami, who owns the properties of Hudson Soft, the designer of the original system. The Mini emulates the original's 8-bit hardware and comes with 57 or 58 games built-in.

== Hardware ==
The Mini is half the size of the original TurboGrafx-16 video game console and can support two controllers (instead of one) out of the box. It includes one full-size replica controller (that connects through USB, so that original controllers are incompatible), a USB-to-Micro-B power cable and an HDMI video cable. Sold exclusively through Amazon, there are separate Mini console releases for North America, Europe and Japan, as the Mini and its included controller that reproduces the original console's regional decal and color variations.

== Games ==
Sixty titles were announced between all regions for the Mini, 54 of which are unique. Konami lists the titles either under the category of "TurboGrafx-16" for the American games or "PC Engine" for the Japanese games; though this listing is heavily simplified as TurboGrafx-CD/CD-ROM², Super CD-ROM², Arcade CD-ROM² and SuperGrafx titles are also included on all regions of the Mini. The Japanese model includes 24 TurboGrafx-16 (American) games and 34 PC Engine (Japanese) games for a total of 58 games. The international model, however, includes 25 TurboGrafx-16 (American) games and 32 PC Engine (Japanese) games for a total of 57 games. Five of the games are counted twice by Konami as they are available in both their TurboGrafx-16 (American) and PC Engine (Japanese) versions on all regions' models. The title Splatterhouse is also technically counted twice, with the uncensored PC Engine (Japanese) version being exclusive to the Japanese model and the censored TurboGrafx-16 (American) version being exclusive to the international models. In addition, three of the other PC Engine (Japanese) games are also exclusive to a specific region, with Tokimeki Memorial and Tengai Makyō II: Manji Maru being exclusive to the Japanese model and Salamander being exclusive to the international models. Aside from Splatterhouse and the five games listed as two game titles, all TurboGrafx-16 listed games remain in English only and all PC Engine listed games remain in Japanese only respectively on all region's model of the Mini (even if both an English and Japanese version exist due to the game being released in both regions during the original console's lifespan). Castlevania: Rondo of Blood Includes a mini-game named "Akumajyo Dracula Peke", Soldier Blade also has its Caravan edition, while Gradius, Fantasy Zone and Salamander have received arrangements listed as "near arcade" versions. These five alternative versions can be played by highlighting them and holding Select while booting the desired game. Tokimeki Memorial and Salamander include the mini-games Force Gear and Twinbee Returns, which are available through cheat codes.

- TG-16 = North American TurboChip game for the TurboGrafx-16
- TG-CD = North American CD-ROM game for the TurboGrafx-CD add-on
- PCE = Japanese HuCard game for the PC Engine
- PCE-CD = Japanese CD-ROM game for the CD-ROM² add-on or Super CD-ROM² add-on
- PCE-CDA = Arcade CD-ROM² (Japanese CD-ROM game for the Super CD-ROM² add-on with Arcade Card upgrade)
- SGFX = SuperGrafx-exclusive HuCard game

Game	Copyright	Version	TurboGrafx-16 / Core Grafx Mini	PC Engine Mini
Air Zonk	Konami/RED	TG-16	Yes	Yes
Aldynes	Konami	SGFX	Yes	Yes
Alien Crush	Konami	TG-16	Yes	Yes
Appare! Gateball	Konami	PCE	Yes	Yes
Blazing Lazers	Konami	TG-16	Yes	Yes
Bomberman '93	Konami	TG-16	Yes	Yes
Bomberman '94	Konami	PCE	Yes	Yes
Bomberman: Panic Bomber	Konami	PCE-CD	Yes	Yes
Bonk's Adventure	Konami/RED	PCE	Yes	Yes
Bonk's Revenge	Konami/RED	TG-16	Yes	Yes
Cadash	Taito	TG-16	Yes	Yes
Castlevania: Rondo of Blood	Konami	PCE-CD	Yes	Yes
Chew Man Fu	Konami	TG-16	Yes	Yes
China Warrior	Konami	PCE	Yes	Yes
Cho Aniki	Extreme	PCE-CD	Yes	Yes
Dragon Spirit	Bandai Namco	PCE	Yes	Yes
Dungeon Explorer	Konami	TG-16	Yes	Yes
Dungeon Explorer	Konami	PCE	Yes	Yes
Fantasy Zone	Sega	PCE	Yes	Yes
Galaga '88	Bandai Namco	PCE	Yes	Yes
The Genji and the Heike Clans	Bandai Namco	PCE	Yes	Yes
Ghouls 'n Ghosts	Capcom	SGFX	Yes	Yes
Ginga Fukei Densetsu Sapphire	Konami	PCE-CDA	Yes	Yes
Gradius	Konami	PCE	Yes	Yes
Gradius II: Gofer no Yabō	Konami	PCE-CD	Yes	Yes
J.J. & Jeff	Konami	TG-16	Yes	Yes
Jaseiken Necromancer	Konami	PCE	Yes	Yes
The Legend of Valkyrie	Bandai Namco	PCE	Yes	Yes
Lords of Thunder	Konami/RED	TG-CD	Yes	Yes
Military Madness	Konami	TG-16	Yes	Yes
Military Madness	Konami	PCE	Yes	Yes
Moto Roader	Extreme	TG-16	Yes	Yes
Neutopia	Konami	TG-16	Yes	Yes
Neutopia	Konami	PCE	Yes	Yes
Neutopia II	Konami	TG-16	Yes	Yes
Neutopia II	Konami	PCE	Yes	Yes
New Adventure Island	Konami	TG-16	Yes	Yes
Ninja Gaiden	Koei Tecmo	PCE	Yes	Yes
Ninja Spirit	Irem	TG-16	Yes	Yes
Parasol Stars	Taito	TG-16	Yes	Yes
Power Golf	Konami	TG-16	Yes	Yes
Psychosis	Konami	TG-16	Yes	Yes
R-Type	Irem	TG-16	Yes	Yes
Salamander	Konami	PCE	Yes	No
Seirei Senshi Spriggan	Konami	PCE-CD	Yes	Yes
Snatcher	Konami	PCE-CD	Yes	Yes
Soldier Blade	Konami	TG-16	Yes	Yes
Space Harrier	Sega	TG-16	Yes	Yes
Splatterhouse	Bandai Namco	TG-16	Yes	No
Splatterhouse	Bandai Namco	PCE	No	Yes
Spriggan Mark 2: Re-Terraform Project	Konami	PCE-CD	Yes	Yes
Star Parodier	Konami	PCE-CD	Yes	Yes
Super Darius	Taito	PCE-CD	Yes	Yes
Super Momotarō Dentetsu II	Konami	PCE	Yes	Yes
Super Star Soldier	Konami	PCE	Yes	Yes
Tengai Makyō II: Manji Maru	Konami	PCE-CD	No	Yes
Tokimeki Memorial	Konami	PCE-CD	No	Yes
Victory Run	Konami	TG-16	Yes	Yes
Ys Book I & II	Nihon Falcom	TG-CD	Yes	Yes
Ys Book I & II	Nihon Falcom	PCE-CD	Yes	Yes

== Production and release ==
The Mini was first announced at the E3 show in June 2019. The announcement was part of a trend of releasing smaller versions of 1980s and 1990s retro video game consoles.

Through its Japanese YouTube channel, Konami revealed all of the titles from the Mini's line-up, including American, European and Japanese line-ups. The Japanese game controller maker Hori also revealed some accessories for the Mini, including a Turbo Pad controller, a multitap that add the number of players up to five and an AC Adapter that accepts USB A to USB Micro-B connectors. American and European representative stores of Hori Japan sell them through their area of continents coverage.

The Mini was originally set to be released worldwide on March 19, 2020, exclusively through Amazon, but was delayed everywhere except for Japan because of the COVID-19 pandemic. Konami announced that the launch of the TurboGrafx-16 Mini and its peripheral accessories would be delayed indefinitely due to the COVID-19 outbreak. The console was shipped in North America on May 22, 2020. The CoreGrafx Mini was released in Europe on June 5, 2020.
