= Super Genjin 2 =

1995 video game

- Developers: A.I Co., Ltd
- Publisher: Hudson Soft
- Series: Bonk
- Platform: Super Famicom
- Release: JP: July 28, 1995; JP: December 1, 1997 (Nintendo Power)
- Genre: Platform
- Mode: Single-player

Super Genjin 2 (超原人 2) is a 1995 2D platform video game by Hudson Soft for Super Famicom. It is the sequel to Super Bonk and the fifth platform game in the Bonk series, and the second game in the series overall never to be released outside Japan.

== Release and reception ==
Reception

Review score
Publication	Score
Famitsu	7/10, 7/10, 7/10, 8/10

Super Genjin 2 was released for the Super Famicom in Japan on July 28, 1995.
