= Super Air Zonk: Rockabilly-Paradise =

1993 video game

- Developer: Dual Corporation
- Publishers: JP: Hudson Soft; NA: Turbo Technologies
- Series: Bonk
- Platform: TurboGrafx-CD/TurboDuo
- Release: JP: July 30, 1993; NA: 1994
- Genre: Horizontal-scrolling shooter
- Mode: Single-player

Super Air Zonk: Rockabilly-Paradise, released in Japan as CD Denjin: Rockabilly Tengoku (Japanese: PC原人シリーズ CD電人 ～ロカビリー天国～), is a horizontally scrolling shooter developed by Dual and published by Hudson Soft. It was released for the TurboGrafx-CD/TurboDuo in 1993, and was later made available on the Wii's Virtual Console on November 19, 2007, in North America, and on January 29, 2008, in Japan.

Super Air Zonk is the sequel to the 1992 game Air Zonk, both of which are part of the Bonk series. As a sequel, Super Air Zonk introduces all-new levels, assistants, and enemies, as well as a Red Book CD audio soundtrack featuring rockabilly music.

== Reception ==
Reception

Review scores
Publication	Score
Consoles +	84%
Eurogamer	6/10
Famitsu	7/10, 6/10, 7/10, 7/10
GameSpot	6.5/10
Gekkan PC Engine	75/100, 70/100, 85/100, 80/100, 80/100
IGN	7/10
Joypad	91%
Mega Fun	79/100
Nintendo Life	7/10
Player One	91%
Hippon Super!	8/10
Megablast	77%
VideoGames	6/10

Super Air Zonk: Rockabilly-Paradise received a score of 19.9 out of 30 in a readers' poll conducted by PC Engine Fan. The game also garnered an average reception from critics. Electronic Gaming Monthly's four reviewers commented that it features very little action or intensity and is far too easy, while GamePro's Manny LaMancha also found the game to be too easy but praised its controls, animation, and soundtrack.
