= Dungeon Explorer: Warriors of Ancient Arts =

- PAL region Nintendo DS version cover art
- Developer: Amble
- Publishers: JP/NA: Hudson Soft; PAL: Rising Star Games
- Platforms: Nintendo DS, PlayStation Portable
- Release: JP: 15 November 2007; NA: 12 February 2008; EU: 28 March 2008 (PSP); PAL: 4 April 2008 (DS)
- Genre: Action role-playing
- Modes: Single player, multiplayer

Dungeon Explorer: Warriors of Ancient Arts, released as simply Dungeon Explorer in Europe, is a video game published by Hudson Soft for the Sony PlayStation Portable and the Nintendo DS handheld game consoles. It is an action role-playing game, related to the TurboGrafx-16 game Dungeon Explorer. It features wireless connectivity to allow multiple players to connect to each other, and also allows for online play using Nintendo Wi-Fi Connection on the Nintendo DS.

== Gameplay ==
The bulk of the storyline for Dungeon Explorer: Warriors of Ancient Arts takes place in various dungeons. Each dungeon is unlocked after various quests are completed by acquiring "plates" and can be leveled up by inserting jewels in said plates. Each level is more challenging than the previous one and can be selected at any given time. At one point Dungeon level progression is stopped until an item called a Sirius Jewel is acquired, a reusable item that unlocks further dungeon empowerment. Specific levels have specific challenges in them, such as Level 6 of a dungeon are considered blind; without the usage of a specific item, the mini-map is blanked out with only the character icons visible.

The title features 3 races and 6 classes that the player can choose from the beginning. From a certain point on, the character has the option to change classes when he is not in the dungeons, each one keeping its own ranks (from "E" to "S"). There are also 6 advanced classes that require the combination of two basic classes: one with rank B and the other with rank A. These advanced classes include the skills of the previous two classes plus new own abilities and unique weapons. All of these skills are acquired as characters level up their range of weapons as well as their range of work, and two of them can be equipped and changed on the fly.

The jewels have multiple purposes in addition to powering up dungeons, they can be consolidated, used in alchemy or installed onto weapons are armor. These jewels are elemental in nature and match each element of the dungeons, which follow a planetary theme (Neptune, Saturn, Jupiter, etc.). In addition, each element has a status ailment associated with it.

== Synopsis ==
The game begins as the "player", an unnamed, but customized character tries to make his or her way as an adventurer by attempting to save a town from certain doom. The hero is told about the great evil trying to escape from a large structure right in the middle of town. Someone or something is weakening the barrier holding the evil inside, and it is up to the new adventurer to find out what it is.

== Reception ==
Reception

Aggregate score
Aggregator	Score	
Aggregator	DS	PSP
Metacritic	60/100	56/100

Review scores
Publication	Score	
Publication	DS	PSP
1Up.com	C	B+
Famitsu	26/40	27/40
Game Informer	N/A	6/10
IGN	6/10	6/10
Jeuxvideo.com	11/20	8/20
Nintendo Power	6.5/10	N/A
Nintendo World Report	6.5/10	N/A
PlayStation: The Official Magazine	N/A	2.5/5
RPGamer	2/5	N/A
RPGFan	70%	72%

Dungeon Explorer: Warriors of Ancient Arts received "mixed" reviews on both platforms according to the review aggregation website Metacritic. In Japan, Famitsu gave it a score of 27 out of 40 for the PSP version, and 26 out of 40 for the DS version. GamePro said of the former handheld version, "Graphics are decent, but the sound is obnoxious. You're going to be sick to death of the sonic snails you fight over and over (since missions constantly send you back to do practically the same thing every time) with their ear-drum piercing screeches. No significant voice acting, either, which could've livened things up a bit. Co-op games are great, but Dungeon Explorer failed to excite us." (Note: GamePro gave the PSP version 3/5 for graphics, 2/5 for sound, 2.25/5 for control, and 2.5/5 for fun factor.)
