= GB Genjin Land: Viva! Chikkun Ōkoku =

1994 video game

- Developers: A.I Co., Ltd
- Publisher: Hudson Soft
- Series: Bonk
- Platform: Game Boy
- Release: JP: April 22, 1994
- Genre: Action game
- Mode: Single-player

GB Genjin Land: Viva! Chikkun Kingdom (GB原人ランド ビバ!チックン王国, GB Genjin Land: Viva! Chikkun Ōkoku lit. GB Primitive Man Land: Viva! Chikkun Kingdom) is an action video game that was released by Hudson Soft for Game Boy on April 22, 1994 in Japan. It is a unique entry in the Bonk series as it consists of multiple mini-games rather than being a standard side-scrolling platformer.
