= Bonk's Adventure =

1989 video game

Bonk's Adventure / PC Kid
- North American cover
- Developers: Red Company/Atlus/A.I; Factor 5 (Amiga)
- Publishers: JP: Hudson Soft; NA: NEC Home Electronics; EU: Ubisoft (Amiga)
- Composers: Tsukasa Masuko; Rudolf Stember (Amiga); Kunio Komatsu (NES)
- Series: Bonk
- Platforms: TurboGrafx-16, NES, Game Boy, Amiga, Arcade
- Release: JP: December 15, 1989; NA: April 1990
- Genre: Platform
- Mode: Single-player

Bonk's Adventure, known as PC Genjin (Note: Japanese: PC原人; lit. "PC Caveman") in Japan, PC Kid and B.C. Kid in Europe, is a scrolling platform game for the PC Engine/TurboGrafx-16 released in 1989 in Japan by Hudson Soft and 1990 in North America by NEC.

Red Company designed the original PC Engine/TurboGrafx-16 version and created its characters whereas Atlus handled most of the game's development, with A.I being responsible of the background details. Hudson Soft supervised and provided the work. Red Company and A.I Company would each later be involved in the development of separate ports for the Game Boy and NES respectively, both of which were published by Hudson Soft.

The Japanese title PC Genjin is a play on the system's original name, PC Engine, with the European title PC Kid similarly referencing the system's name. The first game in the Bonk series, it was followed by two more games for the TurboGrafx-16 before branching out to other platforms.

Bonk's Adventure was ported to the NES and Amiga, as well as being released as a coin-operated arcade game, under different titles (FC Genjin and BC Genjin in Japan, and BC Kid in Europe). A different platformer with the same name, characters and gameplay appeared on the Game Boy in late 1992 (under the title GB Genjin in Japan).

In the arcade version, Bonk is also assisted by a female version of himself.

== Plot ==
The game takes place in a fictional prehistoric era. Its protagonist is Bonk, a strong and bald caveboy who battles anthropomorphic dinosaurs and other prehistoric enemies. Bonk's mission is to rescue Princess Za (a small pink Plesiosaur-type reptile), who has been kidnapped by the evil King Drool (a large, green, Tyrannosaurus-type dinosaur). Drool kidnaps Princess Za after learning that her crown contains special powers, which he uses for taking over her kingdom by brainwashing Princess Za along with the inhabitants of her kingdom, while also transforming the princess into his servant. After several challenges, however, Bonk defeats King Drool on the moon (the home of Princess Za) and frees both the princess and her people from Drool’s control while restoring Princess Za to normal, who also regains her crown.

A 2003 remake of the game featured a cliffhanger ending in which Princess Za is captured in a magical cage that flies off. Bonk powers up before setting off to rescue her, and a ‘TO BE CONTINUED’ sign appears on the screen; foreshadowing the events of the sequel Bonk's Revenge.

== Gameplay ==
Screenshot of the original version

Bonk attacks enemies by "bonking" them with his large, invincible forehead. Bonk starts the game with three hearts' worth of health, which are depleted to blue as Bonk takes damage, and three extra lives. Bonk's health can be restored in increments by collecting fruits and vegetables.

Bonk can also collect pieces of meat as power-ups; these lend him special abilities and make him stronger. There are three stages of a power-up: his normal self, a second stage during which he can stun enemies by pounding on the ground, and a third stage where he becomes temporarily invulnerable. Meat can be found in two varieties: big meat and small meat. The effects of meat are additive but wear off over time. A small meat gives Bonk the second stage of meat power, and a large one takes him to stage three. Eating small meat while in stage two will also put Bonk into the third, invincible stage of meat power. When the third stage effect wears off, he returns to the second state and remains there for a while before turning back to the regular Bonk. Eating either size of meat while in the third stage of meat power-up will reset the timer on Bonk's meat power.

Bonk can occasionally collect red heart power-ups that refill an entire heart worth of health, or even more rarely, a large red heart, which restores all of Bonk's missing health. There are also two rare, blue heart power-ups in the game, which will increase Bonk's maximum health by one heart.

Bonking an enemy will typically knock it backward and slightly into the air. Defeating an enemy yields points and also releases a small "smiley" power-up. Bonk's smileys are totaled at the end of each stage after defeating the boss of that stage. The player is given additional points and a caveman-type congratulation based on how many smileys were collected.

The arcade version is very different: at the beginning of the game, the player can choose from one of 28 different levels. Unlike the console versions, the levels are extremely short, and the goal is to get to the end as quickly as possible while trying to get a high score. There are various sports items in the stages, like basketballs and footballs. As long as Bonk continues to dribble these items, the player will get bonus points. There is a goal post at the end of each level, which grants more points if Bonk hits it at its apex. After completing three stages, the player gets to choose from one of seven boss battles. There are no power-ups in this version. Instead, there are smiley faces, which attach themselves to Bonk's head and can be used to absorb enemy projectiles or extend the length of Bonk's attacks. However, if Bonk gets hit once, he will lose all of his smiley faces, and he will have to pick them up again. This version of the game also includes a two-player mode, where player 2 plays as a female Bonk. The game can be set up to dispense tickets, and the ticket payouts can be adjusted by the operator.

== Regional name differences ==
The character of Bonk, known in Japan as PC-Genjin (PC原人, in English: PC-Caveman), was created by Kobuta Aoki and first appeared in comics created for the magazine Gekkan PC-Engine, in order to promote the console in Japan. In Japanese, PC-Genjin sounds like PC-Engine, and the PC stands for Pithecanthropus Computerus, a pun on Pithecanthropus erectus. It is generally called PC-Kid in English, as he was meant to be NEC's mascot at the time. Later, when the game was ported (or given different versions) for other platforms, it was renamed accordingly, like FC-Kid (after Family Computer, the original Japanese name for the NES, and the FC stood for Freakthoropus Computerus), GB-Kid (after the Game Boy), or the more generic name BC-Kid in some other versions, including Amiga. In North America, this was scrapped, as the game name is always Bonk's Adventure or something similar.

== Reception ==
Reception

Review score
Publication	Score
Electronic Gaming Monthly	7/10, 8/10, 7/10, 8/10

Entertainment Weekly picked the game as the #3 greatest game available in 1991, saying that it is much fun to watch and play at the same time. In 1997 Electronic Gaming Monthly editors ranked the TurboGrafx-16 version as number 85 on their "100 Best Games of All Time", citing its imaginative level designs and hilarious player character.

Computer and Video Games reviewed BC Kid for the Amiga and scored it 93% in 1992. Tim Boone praised the original PC Kid for the PC Engine as being among his "all-time fave console games" and said the Amiga port was a faithful conversion, but with a different title. While praising the original PC Engine version, however, the review criticized the American TurboGrafx-16 version for being titled Bonk, which is an inappropriate slang in British English.

The game sold 350,000 copies.

== Legacy ==
Bonk’s Adventure was followed by the sequels Bonk's Revenge and Bonk 3: Bonk's Big Adventure that were released exclusively on the PC Engine/TurboGrafx-16, together with two games based on the first two games that were released on the Game Boy. An arcade game inspired by the first game was also released, together with various spin-off games on the Game Boy and SNES.

In 2003, Hudson Soft included a 3D remake of Bonk's Adventure in their Hudson Selection series of games released exclusively in Japan for the PlayStation 2 and GameCube consoles.

Factor 5, developers of the Amiga port, have made the Amiga version of BC-Kid available for free through their company website.

The TurboGrafx-16 version was released for Wii's Virtual Console on November 22, 2006, and according to informal surveys it has been one of the most purchased games.

In 2006, a retelling of the original game called Bonk’s Return was released on mobile phones.

In March 2008, a version for mobile phones was released in Japan.

Bonk's Adventure was released on the Virtual Console for Wii U on July 14, 2016, in its TurboGrafx-16 form. The PC Engine version of the game (fully in Japanese) was included on every regional variant of the TurboGrafx-16 Mini which was released exclusively through Amazon on March 19, 2020.

Hudson was developing a new game in the series entitled Bonk: Brink of Extinction for WiiWare and PlayStation Network, but the project was later cancelled when Hudson was closed. In a 2025 interview, Jeremy Staz (who worked on the game) said that by the time of its cancellation it was “mostly finished” and had “No idea” what the official reason for the game’s cancellation was. At the time of the interview, Staz said that if the game were to have a retail release in 2025 it would need a total overhaul, adding “A remake of a game that never shipped, there’s a novel concept. That’s probably the simplest route though, if somebody wanted to.”
