= Bonk (series) =

- Genre: Platformer
- Developer: Red Company
- Publishers: Hudson Soft; Konami (currently)
- Platforms: PC Engine/TurboGrafx-16, Arcade, SNES, NES, Game Boy, Amiga, PS2, GameCube, PSN, iOS, Virtual Console, Mobile
- First release: Bonk's Adventure; December 15, 1989
- Latest release: Bonk's Return; November 1, 2006

Bonk, known as PC-Genjin (Note: Japanese: PC原人; lit. "PC-Primitive-Man" or "PC Caveman") in Japan and as PC Kid or B.C. Kid in PAL territories, is a video game character and former mascot for NEC's PC Engine/TurboGrafx-16 video game console. Three platform games featuring the character appeared on the PC Engine/TurboGrafx-16, as well as two spin-offs featuring Air Zonk. The protagonist is a bald caveman named Bonk who attacks using his comically large head.

His Japanese name PC-Genjin is a pun on the PC Engine, with his European name PC Kid similarly referencing the system's name (the console is also called PC Engine in Europe). The "PC" part of his Japanese and European names also stands for "Pithecanthropus Computerurus", a fictitious species name for the character. The American title Bonk is also not used in the European versions due to the word "bonk" being connoted with having sex in British English.

Konami now owns the rights to the Bonk series as a result of its absorption of the series' publisher Hudson Soft in 2012.

== Origin ==
As stated on Hudson Soft's website, in their "The Definitive Bonk" article, Bonk was originally created as a comic character, PC Caveman (Genjin), in a magazine for the PC Engine. Many people liked the character and there were talks held on giving him a game of his own. In addition to this, many people even mistook him for an upcoming game character even before his game was in development, because the magazine frequently featured comics of upcoming games. It was created by Keisuke Abe.

== Games ==
Bonk's Adventure (PC-Genjin in Japan, PC Kid in Europe) was the first game starring Bonk and was released for the TurboGrafx-16 in 1989. A variation of the TG-16 original eventually appeared on the NES with fewer colors and reduced graphic quality. Another variation was released for the Amiga under the name BC Kid. A completely new game, with 2-player co-op, was released for the arcades, while another new game utilizing the same name was released for the Game Boy. A remake of the original was released in Japan many years later on the PlayStation 2 and the GameCube.

Bonk's Revenge (PC-Genjin 2 in Japan, PC Kid 2 in Europe) was released for the TurboGrafx-16 in 1991, while a completely different game using the same name made it to the Game Boy, the TurboGrafx-16 version was re-released for Windows on December 13, 2013, and the Wii U Virtual Console on March 12, 2014, in Japan.

Bonk 3: Bonk's Big Adventure (PC-Genjin 3) was released for the TurboGrafx-16 as 2 versions in 1993: a TurboChip (cartridge) version and a Super CD-ROM version, the latter of which featured an updated redbook audio soundtrack.

GB Genjin Land: Viva! Chikkun Kingdom was a collection of mini games starring Bonk, released for the Game Boy.

Super Bonk (Super Genjin, Super B.C. Kid) was the 4th game in the series and was released for the Super NES in 1994. It was the first entry in the Bonk series to not be released for the TurboGrafx-16. Super Bonk was later re-released for Nintendo's Virtual Console in Japan on November 16, 2010, the PAL region on December 10, and in North America on April 4, 2011.

Super Genjin 2 was the 5th and final console game in the series. It was the follow-up to Super Bonk, and was released in 1995 only in Japan on the Super Famicom (Super NES).

Genjin Collection, a collection of the 3 Game Boy titles, was released for the Game Boy.

Bonk's Return was released for mobile phones. It features gameplay similar to that of the first two Bonk games.

Mekuttepon! (PC Genjin Version) (めくってポン!(PC原人版)), released on iPhone OS on 2008 in Japan, is part of Do the Hudson!!.

Same Game (PC Genjin Version) (鮫亀(PC原人版)), released on iPhone OS on 2008 in Japan, is part of Do the Hudson!!.

Meijin o Sagase!! (PC Genjin Version) (名人をさがせ!!(PC原人版)), released on iPhone OS on 2008 in Japan, is part of Do the Hudson!!.

Dokka kawatta? (どっか変わった?(PC原人版)), released on iPhone OS on 2008 in Japan, is part of Do the Hudson!!.

=== Unreleased games ===
A conversion of PC Genjin titled Genjin Show: Tobidase! VB Genjin was planned for the Virtual Boy, with a former Hudson Soft employee stating that he played Virtual Bomberman as reference during development but the adaptation was scrapped due to the commercial and critical failure of the platform. PC Alajin, Bonk Strategy (Uesugi Genjin in Japan), PC Genjin no Te-to-Risu, Bonk IV: The Role-Playing Game/Bonk's Quest (RPG Genjin in Japan), Ultra Genjin and Bonk 3D were planned for the TurboGrafx-16, Nintendo 64 and Nintendo 3DS respectively, but were never released. Work done on Ultra Genjin was later repurposed for Bomberman Hero (1998). A new Bonk game developed by Pi Studios, Bonk: Brink of Extinction, was announced for the PlayStation Network, Xbox Live Arcade, WiiWare and the Nintendo 3DS. The title would have included cooperative play but it was cancelled.

== Other media ==
=== Manga ===
- PC Genjin-kun

PC原人くん
- Manga
- Written by: HIKAWA Hirokazu
- Published by: Shogakukan
- Original run: February 1992 – April 1994
- Volumes: 1

- PC Genjin-kun (PC原人くん), was a manga that was released in February 1992 to April 1994, and published by Shogakukan and Author Hikawa Hirokazu.
- The event of Bonk's Revenge, featuring Bonk, was adapted into a manga featuring the Hudson characters titled Hudson Makyou (ハドソン魔境) by Minori Shobo on 1992.
- In the 2010 manga titled Hi Score Girl (ハイスコアガール Haisukoagāru), Bonk makes a cameo in the cartridge for the PC Engine.
