= Neutopia II =

1991 video game

- Developer: Hudson Soft
- Publishers: JP: Hudson Soft; NA: Turbo Technologies, Inc.
- Director: Shigeki Fujiwara
- Designer: Shigeki Fujiwara
- Programmers: Kōji Kaneta; Masato Tobisawa
- Artists: Fumie Takaoka; Yoshikazu Yasuhiko; Yutaka Satō
- Composer: Keita Hoshi
- Series: Neutopia
- Platform: TurboGrafx-16
- Release: JP: September 27, 1991; NA: August 1992
- Genre: Action-adventure
- Mode: Single-player

Neutopia II (Note: Japanese: ニュートピアII, Hepburn: Nyūtopia Tsū) is a 1991 action-adventure and action role-playing video game developed and published in Japan by Hudson Soft and in North America by Turbo Technologies for the TurboGrafx-16. It is the sequel to Neutopia, which was released earlier in 1989. In the game, the player takes control of Jazeta's son, who embarks on a quest to both save his father and defeat the returning evil demon Dirth.

Headed by director and designer Shigeki Fujiwara, Neutopia II was created by a mostly different team at Hudson Soft who did not work on the first Neutopia. First released on the TurboGrafx-16, the game has since been re-released through download services such as the Virtual Console and PlayStation Network download services, in addition to being included on the TurboGrafx-16 Mini console.

Neutopia II received mostly positive reception from critics since its release; praise was given to the varied monster designs, new gameplay additions, straightforward plot and audiovisual presentation, while criticism was geared towards its lack of originality, simplistic puzzles and poor sprite animations, with some stating that the sequel felt indistinguishable from the first Neutopia. A third entry, Neutopia III, was teased by Hudson Soft but never materialized. Retrospective commentary has been equally positive, although some have criticized it as very derivative and imitative of The Legend of Zelda series.

== Gameplay ==
Gameplay screenshot

Neutopia II shares many similarities in visuals and gameplay with the early Legend of Zelda titles. The player takes control of a young boy who freely roams through a sizable 2D environment. The player may progress through accepted tasks in any order at certain points of the game, at other times it is more linear in progression and story.

== Development and release ==
Neutopia II was created by a mostly different team at Hudson Soft who did not work on the first Neutopia, with Shigeki Fujiwara leading its development as director and also acting as game designer. Two members of the original Neutopia staff, Kōji Kaneta and Masato Tobisawa, returned to serve as co-programmers. The characters were designed by Fumie Takaoka, while Yutaka Satō and Yoshikazu Yasuhiko were responsible for designing background graphics and sprites respectively. The soundtrack was composed by Keita Hoshi, who would later work on Soldier Blade and Super Bomberman 3. Hoshi also created the game's sound effects.

Neutopia II was first published in Japan by Hudson Soft on September 27, 1991 for the PC Engine. Prior to launch, it was demonstrated at the 1991 Tokyo Toy Show during summer. The game was first slated for a July 1992 release date in North America, but was published by Turbo Technologies in August 1992 for the TurboGrafx-16. The game was one of many launch titles under the Turbo Technologies Inc relaunch for the TurboGrafx-16, the other games including Air Zonk, Jackie Chan's Action Kung-Fu, and Dungeons and Dragons: Order of the Griffon. The title was re-released for the Wii's Virtual Console on June 12, 2007 in Japan, then in North America on September 10 and later in Europe on September 14. It was also re-released for the PlayStation Network as part of the "PC Engine Archives" line in Japan on July 21, 2010. It was re-released in June 2013 across Japanese cloud gaming services like Hikari TV and G-cluster. In addition, it was re-released through the Wii U's Virtual Console in Japan on July 30, 2014 and later in North America on January 8, 2017. It was included in both the Japanese and western variants of the PC Engine Mini console in 2020.

== Reception ==
Reception

Review scores
Publication	Score
Aktueller Software Markt	8/12
Consoles +	91%
Electronic Gaming Monthly	7/10, 8/10, 7/10, 6/10
Famitsu	7/10, 8/10, 7/10, 5/10
GameFan	85%, 89%
Gekkan PC Engine	85/100, 90/100, 90/100, 85/100, 80/100
Génération 4	90%
Joypad	92%
Joystick	40%
Marukatsu PC Engine	8/10, 8/10, 9/10, 8/10
Video Games (DE)	82%
Hippon Super!	7/10
Play Time	81%
TurboPlay	7/10

Neutopia II received mostly positive reception from critics since its release on the TurboGrafx-16, most of which reviewed it as an import title. Public reception was also positive; readers of PC Engine Fan voted to give the game a 22.24 out of 30 score, ranking at the number 150 spot in a poll, indicating a popular following. Video Games' Martin Gaksch commended its visuals for the varied monster designs, new gameplay additions and stylish music. Famitsu's four reviewers commended the plot for being straightforward and easy to understand, as well as the Zelda-style gameplay but criticized its lack of originality. Consoles Plus' Kaneda Kun and Matt gave positive remarks to the presentation, graphics, character animations, pleasant music and playability but criticized its simplistic puzzles. Likewise, Génération 4's Philippe Querleux gave positive commentary in regards to the audiovisual presentation and gameplay. Similarly, Joypad's Alain Huyghues-Lacour praised its graphics, sprite animations, controls and sound. Joystick's Jean-François Morisse concurred with Lacour on most points but gave the title a low rating.

Aktueller Software Markt's Michael Anton praised Neutopia II for its "great" visuals and soundtrack, "cute" enemy designs and controls but noted that the gameplay was nothing new. TurboPlay stated that the game's graphics, presentation, items and puzzle were "virtually indistinguishable" from the original Neutopia aside from the enemies, plot and world layout. They commended the sound design and gameplay but criticized its labyrinths for their limited variety of puzzles and not deviating in terms of strategy, stating that "your imagination won't be stretched nearly as much as it is in Zelda III". Electronic Gaming Monthly's four reviewers commented that the sequel still felt like Zelda gameplay-wise but gave positive remarks to the effective and fast-paced action, as well as the increased length compared to the original game and audiovisual presentation, although they criticized its poor character animations and lack of originality. GameFan's Dave Halverson and Brody noted that its quest was longer than the first entry but felt that the game was not graphically on par. Play Time's Ray found both graphics and sound fitting for the in-game action, as well as the plot to be dense and atmospheric. He gave a positive remarks to the gameplay, despite noting that it borrowed from Zelda franchise.

=== Retrospective coverage ===
Retrospective reviews for Neutopia II have been equally positive, although some have criticized it as very derivative and imitative of The Legend of Zelda series. Reviewing the Virtual Console re-release, Nintendo Life's Damien McFerran stated that the sequel felt more like an expansion pack to its predecessor than a full-fledged sequel. McFerran commended the game's main quest for being substantial but expressed disappointment with the lack of graphical upgrades compared to the first Neutopia. Eurogamer's Dan Whitehead also reviewed the Virtual Console release and regarded it as a solid role-playing game for the TurboGrafx. IGN's Lucas M. Thomas concurred with McFerran when reviewing the Virtual Console relaunch, stating that the title felt more like a remixed second quest of the original game. Thomas gave positive remarks to its more polished and accessible gameplay due to the introduction of diagonal movement, improved plot progression and diverse character interactions, but felt mixed in regards to the visuals and criticized the sound for not being as "great" as its predecessor, as well as the overuse of hidden rooms. Regardless, he stated that both Neutopia games are equally replayable, and that together offer complete story.

GameSpot's Austin Shau also agreed with both McFerran and Thomas, stating that the game felt like an extension of the first entry. Shau commended its "interesting" mix of enemies and complex labyrinths, as well as the improved audio and gameplay, but criticized the presentation for being generic and for not distinguishing enough from the original. The Japanese book PC Engine Complete Guide 1987-1999 noted that its difficulty level felt low due to the overpowered items the player obtains during gameplay and similarities with the Zelda series. Nevertheless, they stated that Neutopia II was "a good work" and not just an imitation.

=== Legacy ===
A third entry, Neutopia III, had been teased by Hudson Soft during the credits sequence of Neutopia II, but it never materialized. An unofficial iteration of the third title had been in development for the TurboGrafx-CD by homebrew developer Frozen Utopia since 2005, who teased a single in-game screenshot of the game. The last update from Frozen Utopia was in May 2008, when it was said that development on the project was postponed due to the developers focusing on other homebrew projects.
