= Cyber Citizen Shockman 3: The Princess from Another World =

1992 video game

- Developer: Masaya Games
- Publishers: Masaya Games; Ratalaika Games (NS, PS4/5, XBO, XSX)
- Producer: Toshiro Tsuchida
- Platforms: PC Engine CD-ROM²; Nintendo Switch; PlayStation 4; PlayStation 5; Xbox One; Xbox Series X/S
- Release: PC Engine CD-ROM²: JP: February 28, 1992; Nintendo Switch, PS4, PS5, Xbox One, Xbox Series X/S: WW: May 3, 2024
- Genres: Platformer, hack and slash
- Modes: Single-player, multiplayer

Cyber Citizen Shockman 3: The Princess from Another World (Japanese: 改造町人シュビビンマン3 －異界のプリンセス, Hepburn: Kaizō Chōjin Shubibinman 3: Ikai no Princess) is an action game developed and published by Masaya for the PC Engine CD-ROM² in 1992 only in Japan. It is a sequel to Cyber Citizen Shockman 2: A New Menace.

== Gameplay ==
Gameplay screenshot

Shockman 3 is a 2D side scrolling action game.

== Release ==
The game was slated for release in North America in August 1993 under the tentative title Shockman 2, with Turbo Technologies, Inc. as the publisher and Working Designs handling the translation. However, this release was later cancelled.

In 2016, it received a re-release through Project Egg.

Ratalaika Games released the game for the first time in the West on May 3, 2024 for Nintendo Switch, PlayStation 4 and 5, Xbox One, and Xbox Series X/S.

== Reception ==
Reception

Review scores
Publication	Score
Consoles +	80%
Famitsu	6/10, 6/10, 5/10, 4/10
Gekkan PC Engine	85/100, 75/100, 85/100, 75/100, 75/100
Joypad	89%
Joystick	83%
Marukatsu PC Engine	5/10, 7/10, 8/10, 7/10
Game Power	90%

Shockman 3 received generally favorable reviews. The Japanese publication Micom BASIC Magazine ranked the game third in popularity in its May 1992 issue, and it received a score of 23.83 out of 30 in a 1993 readers' poll conducted by PC Engine Fan, ranking among PC Engine titles at the number 49 spot. Joystick's Jean-Marc Demoly and Grégoire Hellot of Joypad praised the game's graphics, soundtrack, and frenetic action, but criticized its low difficulty, particularly in two-player mode. The Ravetto brothers of the Italian magazine Game Power lauded the game's audiovisual present for its detailed sprites, animated cutscenes, soundscapes, and two-player mode, but faulted its overall longevity. Video Games' Julian Eggebrecht opined that players "should not be fooled" by the game's graphics, as it is unplayable due to being "most chaotic action title ever".

Hardcore Gaming 101's David DiRienzo lauded it for being one of the best-looking PC Engine CD-ROM² titles, noting the large, well-animated sprites. DiRienzo also praised its hard rock soundtrack, but felt that the gameplay was simplified and the game rushed due to a lack of structure. Retro Gamer highlighted it as one of the most memorable games about Japanese warriors, opining it "is arguably the best looking" in the series and "spectacular bosses and set pieces complement its demanding swordplay". The Japanese book PC Engine Complete Guide 1987-1999 commented positively on the changes in the plot depending on the selected character, the improved graphics and the abundance of visual scenes, but noted the reduced level of difficulty.
