= Super Bonk =

1994 video game

- Developers: A.I Co, Ltd.
- Publishers: Hudson Soft; Nintendo (AUS)
- Director: Shoichi Yoshikawa
- Artist: Kobuta Aoki
- Composer: Kennosuke Suemura
- Series: Bonk
- Platform: Super Nintendo Entertainment System
- Release: JP: July 22, 1994; NA: November 1994; EU: February–March 1995; AU: 1997
- Genre: Platform
- Mode: Single-player

Super Bonk (released in Europe as Super B.C. Kid and in Japan as Super Genjin (超原人)) is a 1994 platform video game developed by A.I. Co, Ltd. and published by Hudson Soft for the Super Nintendo Entertainment System. It is the fourth game in the Bonk series.

== Gameplay ==
The fourth game in the regular Bonk series, its gameplay is similar to Bonk 3. Super Bonk allows Bonk to travel through time from his prehistoric levels to the inside of a dinosaur, a version of modern Chinatown, and the moon. Along the way, Bonk can find power-ups that can change his form into creatures, such as the shooting Bonk Crab, a dinosaur form called Big Kronk, and candies that change his size from tiny to huge. He can also travel through transportation tubes and find multiple bonus levels. Additionally, Bonk uses his head to smash his enemies, propeller seeds allow Bonk to fly, and for the first time can carry flowers on his head in his continuing battle against his arch nemesis King Drool.

== Development and release ==
Super Bonk was released for the Super Famicom in Japan on July 22, 1994.

The game was later re-released for the Wii Virtual Console in Japan on November 16, 2010, in Europe on December 10, and in North America on April 4, 2011.

== Reception ==
Reception

Aggregate score
Aggregator	Score
GameRankings	71.50%

Review scores
Publication	Score
AllGame	4/5
Famitsu	6/10, 6/10, 6/10, 5/10
IGN	5.5/10
Nintendo Life	8/10
Nintendo Power	3.05/5
Official Nintendo Magazine	83/100
Super Play	75%
Total!	(UK) 85/100 (DE) 2
Games Amusement Pleasure	77%
Nintendo Magazine System	8/10
Super Gamer	85/100
Ultimate Future Games	91%

Super Bonk garnered an average reception from critics, holding a rating of 71.50% based on four reviews according to review aggregator GameRankings. The Japanese publication Micom BASIC Magazine ranked the game ninth in popularity in its October 1994 issue, and it received a 22.2/30 score in a readers' poll conducted by Super Famicom Magazine. GamePro's Tommy Glide praised the clever usage of Bonk's various forms, the crisp graphics, the easy controls, and the numerous bonus rounds, but nonetheless gave Super Bonk an overall negative assessment, concluding that platformer fans in general and Bonk fans in particular would find very little new content about the game. In 1995, Total! ranked the game as number 44 on its list of the top 100 SNES games, writing: "Despite slightly awkward controls this is an amusing, well crafted and gripping platformer".
