= Neutopia =

1989 video game

- North American box art
- Developer: Hudson Soft
- Publishers: JP: Hudson Soft; NA: NEC
- Platform: TurboGrafx-16
- Release: JP: November 17, 1989; NA: April 15, 1990
- Genre: Action-adventure
- Mode: Single-player

Neutopia (Note: Japanese: ニュートピア, Hepburn: Nyūtopia) is an overhead action-adventure video game developed by Hudson Soft. It was released by Hudson for the PC Engine in Japan on November 17, 1989. It was then released by NEC for the TurboGrafx-16 in North America on April 15, 1990. It was re-released for the Virtual Console service worldwide for the Wii in 2007; it was re-released for the PlayStation Network in Japan in 2010 and in North America in 2011. It was re-released for the Wii U on April 16, 2014 in Japan, and in USA and Europe in 2017. The game takes place in the land of Neutopia, where the evil demon Dirth has captured Princess Aurora and has stolen the eight ancient medallions which contain the wisdom and power necessary to maintain peace and prosperity throughout the land. It is up to the protagonist Jazeta to retrieve the eight medallions, defeat Dirth, rescue Princess Aurora, and save the land and its people.

Neutopia is widely regarded as a clone of the popular Nintendo game The Legend of Zelda in nearly every aspect. Many reviewers have praised the game for making noticeable improvements over Zelda, but various shortcomings – which include long passwords unless the system is used in conjunction with an add-on providing battery-backed RAM, repetitive gameplay, and poor collision detection – prevent the game from being superior to the 1986 Nintendo title. Overall, reviewers have called Neutopia one of the better video games of its type and one of the better titles in the TurboGrafx-16 library. The game received a sequel, Neutopia II, in which Jazeta disappears and his son sets out to find him.

== Plot ==
Neutopia takes place in the distant past in the land of Neutopia – a prosperous and peaceful land in which the people worshipped at a Sacred Shrine and were watched over by Princess Aurora. The land was divided into four contiguous areas called spheres: land, subterrain, sea, and sky. The people lived in prosperity and happiness with the help of eight spiritual medallions which were controlled by the Princess and were used for good; a "Climactic Castle" was built as a symbolization of their prosperity. Each of the medallions represented powers of an ancestor whom Neutopia's nemesis, the evil demon Dirth, turned to stone but whose spirit remains.

Then, one night, Dirth appears and invades the land. He sends his army of demons to ravage the land, and he captures Princess Aurora and holds her captive in the Climactic Castle, where he would rule over the invading demons. He also steals the eight medallions, which he now controls for evil purposes; he scatters the eight medallions across the four spheres and places them in crypts. A young warrior named Jazeta arrives at the Sacred Shine, where he is given a "charmed compass" which "has the force of the medallions" and can guide him to them. He is also told that he would inherit the wisdom of his ancestors and win the Princess' love if victorious. Jazeta then ventures out to defeat Dirth and rescue Princess Aurora, so that she can free Dirth's spell over the ancient ancestors' spirits and use the medallions to restore peace to Neutopia.

== Gameplay ==
Neutopia is an action adventure game which features a top-down perspective and labyrinthine exploration similar to that of The Legend of Zelda. The player controls Jazeta as he sets out to rescue Princess Aurora from Dirth. The game has four levels called spheres which Jazeta must explore and recover the two medallions from each. The medallions are hidden in crypts, where each medallion is guarded by a boss. After collecting all eight of them, Jazeta gains access to the North Pole, where Dirth resides. The player controls Jazeta by moving in any direction with the control pad. Jazeta can also attack with his weapons or use items, scroll through messages, or access the "status screen" with the controller. Jazeta's life meter, the weapons he is currently holding, and the amount of gold and bombs remaining are displayed during gameplay on the top of the screen. On the status screen, players can choose an item to use, see which direction they must travel as indicated by the charmed compass (which also sounds an alarm when Jazeta is near a crypt or a medallion), and view the map of the crypt Jazeta is in, provided they have collected the Crystal Ball inside.

The basic gameplay of Neutopia, which shows off the fire rod weapon.

Throughout the game, players can collect information from other non-player characters, many of whom are located in caves throughout the overworld, in which some can be uncovered only by burning objects with fire, blowing up walls with bombs, or by pushing certain rocks. While Jazeta's main weapon is a sword, he can also use other items scattered throughout the game. The "fire rod" unleashes fireballs whose strength and range depend on Jazeta's health level; Other items include the "moonbeam moss" which can illuminate dark rooms; the "rainbow drop" which allows Jazeta to cross small gaps; "falcon shoes" which give him extra speed; medicine which refills his life meter; magic rings which can transform tough enemies into weaker ones; hourglasses which temporarily stop enemies; and wings which can warp him back to the place where he last received a password. Jazeta can also obtain sword, shield, and armor upgrades throughout the game which can increase attack power, increase defense against projectiles, and decrease enemy damage, respectively; each type of sword, shield, and armor ranges from bronze to silver to "strongest". Enemies in the game include spear-throwing goblins, fireball-throwing fish, fake rocks, ghosts, and charging knights.

Jazeta has a life meter, which increases by one unit every time the player collects a medallion or finds a monk throughout the spheres; it decreases whenever he gets hit, and the game ends when it runs out. However, provided players have collected the "Book of Revival", they can continue and restart the game wherever they have last obtained a password, even after the console has been shut off; passwords also allow players to resume play at a later time. In addition, for users with a TurboGrafx-CD or a TurboBooster-Plus, they can save their progress in the systems' RAM via a "File Cabinet" feature; in the same places where passwords are distributed, players have the option to save the game in one of four available file slots, each of which can be overwritten at any time with a new file.

== Development and release ==
Neutopia was developed by Hudson Soft and was released on November 17, 1989 in Japan for the PC Engine and on April 15, 1990 in North America for NEC's TurboGrafx-16 console. It received preview coverage in video game magazines Electronic Gaming Monthly and GamePro, and was described in the latter as "a magic and monsters type role play". The game received a brief description in GamePro's May 1990 issue and a full walkthrough in the premiere issue of TurboPlay in June that year. It would later be released for the Wii's Virtual Console service in Japan on May 1, 2007, in North America on August 20, and in Europe on August 24; it was released alongside Super Metroid and Shinobi III: Return of the Ninja Master. It was released for the PlayStation Network along with a series of other TurboGrafx-16 titles that were published by Hudson Soft; it was released in Japan on June 16, 2010, and in North America on April 19, 2011. It was also later released for the Wii U Virtual Console service in Japan on April 16, 2014, and in March 2017 for North America and Europe.

== Reception ==
Reception

Review scores
Publication	Score
Electronic Gaming Monthly	7/10, 6/10, 7/10, 8/10
Game Informer	8.5/10
GameSpot	7.0/10
IGN	7.5/10
Nintendo Life	8/10
Power Play	81/100

Since its release, people have widely regarded Neutopia as a clone of Nintendo's The Legend of Zelda. The PC Engine version of the game was reviewed in the February 1990 issue of German magazine Power Play, where reviewer Martin Gaksch called the game "Zelda on the PC-Engine" and said that the "differences between Zelda and Neutopia must be found with an electron microscope". They said that the graphics, music, and gameplay were good, and that the only thing that kept Neutopia from being superior to Zelda was the 24-character password system and that the text was in Japanese.

Neutopia received much coverage from various video gaming websites after its release on the Virtual Console, and each drew comparisons to Zelda. Marcel van Duyn from Nintendo Life noted many similarities to Zelda, including the existence of 8 dungeons and medallions, the need to blow up walls or burn bushes to uncover secrets, the dungeon designs, and the need to push blocks to uncover staircases, but also said that what sets it apart from Zelda are the fire rod, the ability to warp with wings, and a lower difficulty level. He concluded that the game, while copying Zelda, might be better as it added additional features that set it apart. Destructoid's Tony Ponce compared the game's copying of Zelda to China Warrior's copying of Kung-Fu Master, and he pointed out what are also considered Zelda clones such as Crusader of Centy and Alundra for the Sega Genesis and PlayStation, respectively.

GameSpot's Austin Shau reviewed Neutopia in November 2007 and said progression through the game was "quick and direct" but was also more linear, unlike with Zelda. He praised the game for its variety of environments, which he said "helps to combat monotony", but he noted the lack of detail in the graphics itself. He also criticized the game's sound, in which he said the background music was a series of "grating instrumentations" while also pointing out the low-quality TurboGrafx-16 sound chip. IGN's Lucas Thomas called Neutopia "one of the most shameless Legend of Zelda clones ever created" in nearly every aspect. He praised one of the differences in the presence of the fire rod, which he said "is unlike any weapon the 8-bit Link ever wielded"; he also noted the clean, crisp graphics and a good quality soundtrack. He criticized another difference from Zelda, that Neutopia had poor collision detection, saying that it can lead to additional damage to Jazeta, which causes the power of the fire rod to decrease and lead to the annoying "beeping sound" just as in Zelda. In general, Thomas said that, despite its lack of originality, Neutopia is a good TurboGrafx-16 game which has deserved all the praise it has received.
