= Jaseiken Necromancer =

1988 video game

- Cover art by H. R. Giger from his 1976 painting, The Spell III
- Developer: Hudson Soft
- Publisher: Hudson Soft
- Composers: Jun Chikuma; Nightmare Reborn; Yuzo Koshiro; Takeshi Yanagawa
- Platform: PC Engine
- Release: JP: January 22, 1988
- Genre: Role-playing
- Mode: Single-player

Jaseiken Necromancer (邪聖剣(じゃせいけん)ネクロマンサー) is a 1988 role-playing video game by Hudson Soft for the PC Engine. The game has never been officially translated into English despite becoming available as a downloadable purchase in United States and Europe.

A sequel, Necromancer 2, was released on mobile devices in Japan. It was ported to the Nintendo DSi as Jaseiken Necromancer: Nightmare Reborn in 2010.

== Re-releases ==
On December 2, 2006, Jaseiken Necromancer saw its first release on the Nintendo Wii Virtual Console in Japan.

On December 16, 2009, the game was re-released for the PlayStation 3 and PlayStation Portable, available only on PlayStation Network in Japan.

In February 2011, the game was released as Necromancer on Apple's App Store, but is no longer available to purchase.

In March 2017, the game was released in Japan on the Nintendo Wii U Virtual Console. In February 2018 it was added to the United States and Europe eShops in original untranslated form, the first time the game was available for purchase outside of Japan.

In 2020, the game was released as one of the 57 games included in the international release of the TurboGrafx-16 Mini.
