= Victory Run =

1987 video game

- Developer: Hudson Soft
- Publisher: Hudson Soft
- Composer: Takeaki Kunimoto
- Platforms: PC Engine/TurboGrafx-16, Virtual Console, PlayStation Network
- Release: PC Engine: JP: December 28, 1987; TurboGrafx-16: NA: August 29, 1989; Virtual Console: JP: December 2, 2006 (Wii); NA: December 4, 2006 (Wii); EU: December 8, 2006 (Wii); JP: September 17, 2014 (Wii U); PlayStation Network: JP: April 22, 2010; NA: June 3, 2011
- Genre: Racing

Victory Run (ビクトリーラン栄光の13,000キロ―, Bikutoriran Eikou no 13,000 Kiroo; "Victory Run: 13,000 Kilometers of Glory") is a racing game released by Hudson Soft for the PC Engine in Japan in 1987 and the TurboGrafx-16 in North America in 1989. It was also available worldwide on the Nintendo Wii's Virtual Console and the PlayStation Network. The game depicts the Paris-Dakar Rally, one of the earliest to do so. One of the unique features at the time of release of Victory Run was that the car's parts degraded as they are used and/or abused. Degraded parts could be replaced, but only if the player has the correct type of spare part. The player can acquire up to 20 spare parts before the first race, but cannot acquire any more spare parts after starting the first race.

== Release ==
Victory Run was first released for the PC Engine in 1987 in Japan, and one of the first games to be released on the platform. Two years later, it also saw its North American debut on the TurboGrafx-16, marking the first game to ever be released on the PC Engine's North American counterpart platform.

The game was made available on the Virtual Console for the Wii in Japan on December 2, 2006, North America on December 4, 2006, Europe on December 8, 2006 and Australia on July 6, 2007. It was also available on the PlayStation Network in Japan on April 21, 2010 and in North America on May 31, 2011, and can be playable on the PlayStation 3, PlayStation Portable or PlayStation Vita.

In 2020, Victory Run has been included on the PC Engine Mini in Japan, TurboGrafx-16 Mini in North America and on the PC Engine CoreGrafx Mini in Europe, and it is one of sixty titles be released on respective consoles.

== Reception ==
Reception

Review scores
Publication	Score
Computer and Video Games	80%, 82%
Electronic Gaming Monthly	6/10, 8/10, 7/10, 8/10
Eurogamer	1/5
IGN	6.5/10
Nintendo Life	5/10
The Games Machine (UK)	59%
Power Play	76/100

Victory Run received a 15.48/30 score in a 1993 readers' poll conducted by PC Engine Fan, ranking among PC Engine titles at the number 482 spot. The game received mixed reviews from critics.
