= Double Dungeons =

1989 video game

- Japanese box art
- Developer: Thinking Rabbit
- Publishers: JP: Masaya Games; NA: NEC
- Platform: TurboGrafx-16
- Release: JP: September 29, 1989; NA: July 1990
- Genres: Role-playing, dungeon crawl
- Modes: Single-player, multiplayer

Double Dungeons is a dungeon crawl role-playing video game developed by Thinking Rabbit and published by NEC for the TurboGrafx-16 in 1989 in Japan and in 1990 in North America. Its unique selling point was that it supports simultaneously two-player gameplay.

It was released for the Wii Virtual Console in Japan on March 6, 2007, in Europe on March 9, 2007, and in North America on March 12, 2007. It was released for the Wii U Virtual Console in Japan on February 10, 2015, in North America on September 28, 2017, in Europe on October 5, 2017, and in Australia on October 6, 2017.

== Gameplay ==
In the game, players select from 22 levels, earning gold and experience by killing enemies. The last level is not accessible until the player beats the others. Gold can be used to buy weapons, armors and items at a shop, or rest at an inn, while the experience points help to raise the player's level.

The player(s) cannot die, but are sent back to the start of the dungeon if they lose in battle. The two-player split-screen mode is co-op.

== Reception ==
The Virtual Console release received poor scores by IGN and Nintendo Life.
