= Cyber Citizen Shockman 2: A New Menace =

1991 video game

- Japanese cover art
- Developer: Winds
- Publishers: Masaya Games; NCS Corporation; Hudson Soft; Ratalaika Games (NS, PS4/5, XBO, XSX)
- Producer: Toshiro Tsuchida
- Platforms: TurboGrafx-16; Nintendo Switch; PlayStation 4; PlayStation 5; Xbox One; Xbox Series X/S
- Release: TurboGrafx-16: JP: April 27, 1991; NA: November 22, 1992; Nintendo Switch, PlayStation 4/5, Xbox One, Xbox Series X/S: WW: September 22, 2023
- Genre: Platform
- Mode: Up to 2 players

Cyber Citizen Shockman 2: A New Menace (改造町人シュビビンマン2 新たなる敵, Kaizō Chōjin Shubibinman 2: Aratanaru Teki) is a 1991 video game developed by Winds and released exclusively for the TurboGrafx-16. It was released in the United States in 1992 as Shockman, making it the only game in the Cyber Citizen Shockman series to have a contemporary release outside Japan before the entire series got re-released by Ratalaika Games.

== Plot ==
A New Menace takes about two years after the original Cyber Citizen Shockman. Arnold (Note: Tasuke (太助) in the Japanese version)) is no longer a student and works as a cook in a local restaurant. Sonya (Note: Kyapiko (キャピ子)) remains a student. Since the fall of the Dark Skull, Doc has constantly suspected that another invasion was coming sending Arnold and Sonya on searches for the new invaders although never finding anything. However, one day, after Doc is kidnapped, Arnold and Sonya find out that an alien empire led by Ryo is planning to take over the world. Also, two other villains have appeared with similar powers to Arnold and Sonya. They are dark Shockmen named Jeeta (Note: In Japan: ベータ Bēta) and Mue (Note: ミュー Myū). Arnold and Sonya must now rescue Doc, stop Ryo from taking over the world, and avoid being killed by Jeeta and Mue.

== Gameplay ==
A New Menace plays very differently from the previous title. Swordplay has been eliminated and is replaced by a ranged weapon much like Mega Man's Mega Buster. The world map, upgrades, and hostages have also been removed from the game. There are also now two side-scrolling shooter stages. Additionally, jump control has been altered.

== Release ==
The game was released in Japan on April 27, 1991. It was re-released on the Wii Virtual Console worldwide throughout 2007. It was released in the 2010s for the Wii U Virtual Console.

It received a release for the iPhone in 2011, through an app called "PC Engine Gamebox", which included several other PC Engine titles.

Ratalaika Games re-released the game on September 22, 2023 for Nintendo Switch, PlayStation 4 and 5, Xbox One, and Xbox Series X/S.

== Reception ==
Reception

Review scores
Publication	Score
Eurogamer	6/10
Famitsu	5/10, 5/10, 6/10, 5/10
Gekkan PC Engine	80/100, 85/100, 80/100, 75/100, 80/100
Génération 4	70%
Joystick	83%
Marukatsu PC Engine	4/10, 7/10, 7/10, 8/10
Nintendo Life	6/10
Game Boy	3/5, 4/5, 3/5, 5/5, 4/5
Hippon Super!	7/10
Play Time	44%

Cyber Citizen Shockman 2: A New Menace received average reviews from critics. Japanese publication Micom BASIC Magazine ranked the game third in popularity in its July 1991 issue, and it received a score of 22.63 out of 30 in a 1993 readers' poll conducted by PC Engine Fan, ranking among PC Engine titles at the number 113 spot.
