= Bonk 3: Bonk's Big Adventure =

1993 video game

- Developers: A.I Co., Ltd.
- Publishers: JP: Hudson Soft; NA: Turbo Technologies
- Series: Bonk
- Platforms: TurboGrafx-16, TurboDuo
- Release: TurboGrafx-16: JP: April 2, 1993; NA: August 1993; TurboDuo Super CD: NA: December 1994
- Genre: Platform
- Modes: Single-player, multiplayer

Bonk 3: Bonk's Big Adventure (PC-原人3, PC-Genjin 3) is an action video game released for the TurboGrafx-16 in 1993, the third game in the Bonk video game series.

== Gameplay ==
Bonk 3: Bonk's Big Adventure brought the series many new gameplay elements, including candies that made the player shrink and grow, and cooperative multiplayer. The story is similar to that of the other Bonk games, putting the player character up against Evil King Drool and many new enemies in the Dinosaur Kingdom.

== Release ==
The game was rereleased for the TurboDuo in 1994, with a new cover illustration by Marc Ericksen. Bonk 3: Bonk's Big Adventure was the last North American HuCard and Super CD game released for the TurboGrafx-16. It was released for the Wii Virtual Console in Europe on August 31, 2007, and in North America on September 3. It was also released in Japan on the PlayStation Store on January 20, 2010, and on the Wii U Virtual Console June 25, 2014, the latter receiving a North American release on June 29, 2017.

== Reception ==
Reception

Aggregate score
Aggregator	Score
GameRankings	77.25%

Review scores
Publication	Score
Consoles +	91%
Eurogamer	6/10
Famitsu	8/10, 6/10, 7/10, 6/10
GameFan	70%, 66%, 73%, 64%
GamesMaster	86%
GameSpot	6.5/10
Gekkan PC Engine	90/100, 80/100, 95/100, 80/100, 85/100
IGN	7.5/10
Jeuxvideo.com	16/20
Joypad	93%
Mega Fun	83/100
Nintendo Life	8/10
Official Nintendo Magazine	89%
Video Games (DE)	86% 84%
VideoGames & Computer Entertainment	8/10
Dengeki PC Engine	75/100, 85/100, 75/100, 75/100
Go! Hand-Held Video Games	92/100
Hippon Super!	7/10
Megablast	86%
Play Time	85%
VideoGames	8/10

Bonk 3: Bonk's Big Adventure garnered generally favorable reception from critics, holding a rating of 77.25% based on four reviews according to review aggregator GameRankings. The game received a score of 23.27 out of 30 in a 1993 readers' poll conducted by PC Engine Fan, ranking among PC Engine titles at the number 71 spot. Electronic Gaming Monthly's four editors praised the co-op mode, attractive cartoonish graphics, and quirky audio, but felt that it offered little new content to the Bonk series. Reviewing the TurboDuo version, GamePro's Manny LaMancha praised Bonk's variety of abilities, the cartoony graphics, and the CD audio, but criticized the pacing and controls and stated that it offers too little new content to be worthwhile to gamers who had already played the cartridge version.
