= Dungeon Explorer (1989 video game) =

1989 video game

- Developer: Atlus
- Publishers: JP: Hudson Soft; NA: NEC
- Directors: Kazutoshi Ueda; Yōsuke Niino
- Programmers: Takashi Hasegawa; Uni Arato
- Artists: Hideyuki Yokoyama; Hiroshi Tsuji; Yoshiaki Kitamura
- Composer: Tsukasa Masuko
- Series: Dungeon Explorer
- Platform: TurboGrafx-16
- Release: JP: 4 March 1989; NA: 15 November 1989
- Genres: Action role-playing game Dungeon crawl Hack and slash
- Modes: Single-player, multiplayer

Dungeon Explorer (Note: Japanese: ダンジョン エクスプローラー, Hepburn: Danjon Ekusupurōrā) is an action role-playing video game developed by Atlus for the TurboGrafx-16 and originally published by Hudson Soft in Japan on March 4, 1989, and later in North America by NEC on November 15 of the same year. The first installment in the eponymous franchise, the game is set in the land of Oddesia, which has been overrun by an alien race and where players assume the role of one of eight main characters tasked with recovering the Ora stone to kill the alien king Natas. Co-directed by Kazutoshi Ueda and Yōsuke Niino, the title was created by most of the same team that would work on later several projects such as entries in the Megami Tensei series. Though it was initially launched for the TurboGrafx-16, it was later re-released through download services for various consoles.

Dungeon Explorer garnered positive reception from critics during its initial release and is considered a pioneer title in the action role-playing game genre due to its co-operative multiplayer gameplay for up to five players, but has been met with a more mixed response from reviewers in recent years. It was followed by four sequels: Dungeon Explorer II (1993), Dungeon Explorer for Sega CD and Crystal Beans from Dungeon Explorer (1995), as well as Dungeon Explorer: Warriors of Ancient Arts (2007).

== Gameplay ==
Gameplay screenshot

Dungeon Explorer is an action role-playing game with dungeon crawl and hack and slash elements that is played in a top-down perspective reminiscent of Gauntlet where players assume the role of one of the eight main characters tasked with recovering the Ora stone to ultimately kill the alien king Natas and restore peace to the land of Oddesia. Each character belongs to a class (fighter, thief, warlock, witch, bishop, elf, bard, or gnome) and their abilities vary primarily in their black and white magic as well as statistics. For example, the bishop's white potion heals nearby allies, whereas the bard's black potion has the ability to change the music. Special classes, like the princess and hermit, can also be unlocked via password as the game progresses.

The players explore towns or fields to find a dungeon, which hosts a boss that must be defeated to advance and each boss leaves a crystal after their defeat, which cycles through four colors and corresponds with the character's stats (attack, strength, agility and intelligence). Players can also increase their stats by defeating enemies or finding accessories through the map. The game supports up to five players simultaneously but lives are shared between players and the game is over once they are lost. The password system is also used to keep progress for each player.

== Synopsis ==
Dungeon Explorer centers on the quest of several heroes to find the Ora Stone for the king of Oddesia. When the alien race that now rules the land invaded, the stone was hidden deep in the dungeons of the land by the King to keep it safe. Now, however, the king wants the players to recover the stone, which can bring life, light, and happiness to kill the alien king Natas. The heroes progress through several different dungeons, fight fearsome beasts, and finally recover the Ora stone. Upon giving it to the king, the latter reveals himself as Natas and steals the stone. A guard named Judas also betrays the heroes, but is defeated by them. The adventurers then chase and confront Natas, killing him and taking back the Ora stone, ushering in a time of peace.

== Development and release ==
Dungeon Explorer was created by most of the same team that would work on several projects such as later entries in the Megami Tensei series, with Kazutoshi "Boo" Ueda and Yōsuke "HotRice" Niino acting as directors. Takashi "Hieimon" Hasegawa and Uni "oooo" Arato served as programmers, while artists Hideyuki "Tonny" Yokoyama, Hiroshi "BLADOE" Tsuji and Yoshiaki "Sting" Kitamura were responsible for the pixel art. The soundtrack was composed by Tsukasa "Dosanko Macco" Masuko. Other people also collaborated in its development, with Star Parodier designer Tadayuki Kawada being also involved with the project as his first work in the video game industry, supervising the graphics and game balancing.

Dungeon Explorer was first released for the PC Engine in Japan by Hudson Soft on March 4, 1989, and later in North America by NEC on November 15 of the same year. The game was later re-released for the Wii's Virtual Console in Europe on December 8, 2006, and in North America on January 8, 2007. The Wii version could be played with 5 players, with at least one person using a GameCube controller. The title was also re-released on the Japanese and North American PlayStation Network.

== Reception ==
Contemporary reception

Review scores
Publication	Score
ACE	890/1000
Aktueller Software Markt	9/12; 11/12
Computer and Video Games	94%
Dragon	5/5
Electronic Gaming Monthly	28/40
Famitsu	29/40
HobbyConsolas	84/100
Tilt	15/20
Power Play	75/100

The original PC Engine and TurboGrafx-16 releases of Dungeon Explorer were met with a positive reception from reviewers upon release. Public reception was also positive; readers of PC Engine Fan voted to give the game a 23.66 out of 30 score, ranking at the number 60 spot in a poll, indicating a popular following. ACE and Computer and Video Games' Julian Rignall praised the visual presentation for its small but detailed animated sprites, atmospheric imaginative backdrops, stereo soundtrack, challenging but addictive gameplay, as well as the multiplayer mode. Both Peter Braun and Manfred Kleimann of Aktueller Software Markt commended its audiovisual presentation, gameplay and length but criticized certain shortcomings of the game. Dragon's three reviewers gave the title a perfect rating in 1990, referring it as a greatly expanded version of Gauntlet. They noted its combination of arcade-style action with role-playing game elements due to character-specific abilities and magic, as well as the freedom to search regions without requiring previous dungeon victories.

Electronic Gaming Monthly's four reviewers referred Dungeon Explorer as a "better-than-average action/adventure title" similar to Gauntlet and felt that its mixture of text and adventure elements were fitting. They also commended its audiovisual presentation and gameplay. Hobby Consolas' Sonia Herranz praised its small but sharp visuals, music, sound effects, addictive gameplay, ability to play with five players and choose between eight characters with their own attributes. However, Herranz criticized the game's password system for starting players back at the beginning area and lack of care with the scenery. Tilt's Alain Huyghues-Lacour felt that the title was inspired by Gauntlet but gave positive remarks to the graphics, sprite animations and sound. Power Play's Michael Hengst stated that the visuals were better than Gauntlet II and noted its infusion of role-playing elements into the Gauntlet formula. Hengst gave positive commentary in regards to the stereo sound and multiplayer, but remarked that playing solo makes the game more difficult.

=== Retrospective coverage ===
Retrospective reviews for Dungeon Explorer have been more mixed. Eurogamer's Kristan Reed felt more like Zelda with Gauntlet elements and noted the ability to support five players simultaneously. However, Reed stated that the game was "nothing special these days, but one to pick up if you've got nostalgic associations as it's perfectly playable in a mindless way." GameSpot's Greg Mueller commended its large and diverse dungeons, colorful graphics and catchy music but criticized the gameplay for being shallow, punishing difficulty and clunky password system. IGN's Mark Birnbaum gave positive remarks to the dungeon layouts, soundtrack and multiplayer but criticized its visuals, average sound effects and repetitive gameplay. Nintendo Life's Damien McFerran remarked that the title built on the concept of Gauntlet by introducing role-playing game elements and locations to explore, which added more depth and felt it was a much better game than Gauntlet. Richard Aihoshi of RPG Vault considered it a pioneer title in the action role-playing game genre due to its co-operative multiplayer gameplay for up to five players.

== Legacy ==
A sequel to the game, Dungeon Explorer II, was later released for the TurboGrafx-CD console in 1993. A heavily modified port of Dungeon Explorer II was made for the Super Famicom, titled Crystal Beans from Dungeon Explorer, and was released in Japan in 1995. There was also a Sega CD game which goes by the name of Dungeon Explorer. It is related to the series, but not a port of any previous game, and very different from the others. Developed by Westone, Dungeon Explorer for the Sega CD is far closer to Gauntlet than other games in the series. Weapons and armor may be bought with the gold found in dungeons.

In 2007, two related games, again different from the original titles, were released to coincide with the release of the original Dungeon Explorer on the Wii's Virtual Console. Both Dungeon Explorer: Meiyaku no Tobira and Dungeon Explorer: Jashin no Ryouiki were released for the PlayStation Portable and Nintendo DS respectively on November 15, 2007. Both games were localized but released as Dungeon Explorer: Warriors of Ancient Arts.
