= Moto Roader =

1989 video game

- Developer: NCS
- Publishers: JP: Masaya Games (PC Engine); NA: NEC (TurboGrafx-16) (Note: Wii Virtual Console published worldwide by Hudson Soft.); (Note: Wii U Virtual Console published by Konami in Japan and North America and by Extreme in PAL regions.)
- Platform: PC Engine/TurboGrafx-16
- Release: JP: February 23, 1989; NA: 1989
- Genre: Racing
- Mode: Single-player

Moto Roader is a futuristic racing game developed by NCS for the PC Engine/TurboGrafx-16. The game is the first in a series which includes Moto Roader 2 and Moto Roader MC. It is notable for having a possible five players race simultaneously, one more player than most games' maximum number.

== Development and release ==
The game was released on the Wii's Virtual Console worldwide in January 2007. It was released on the Wii U's Virtual Console in Japan on December 17, 2014, and in North America, Europe, and Australia in October 2017.

== Reception ==
Reception

Review scores
Publication	Score
AllGame	3.5/5
Computer and Video Games	78%
Eurogamer	2/10
Famitsu	7/10, 6/10, 7/10, 6/10
IGN	6/10
Joystick	86%
Marukatsu PC Engine	4/10, 5/10, 6/10, 5/10
Nintendo Life	4/10
Tilt	11/20
Micro News	5/5
Power Play	74/100

According to Famitsu, Moto Roader sold over 1,379 copies in its first month on the market in Japan. The game received a 21.19/30 score in a 1993 readers' poll conducted by PC Engine Fan, ranking among PC Engine titles at the number 233 spot. It also garnered mixed reviews from critics.
