= Air Zonk =

1992 video game

- North American box art
- Developers: Red Company; Naxat Soft
- Publishers: JP: Hudson Soft; NA: Turbo Technologies
- Composers: Daisuke Morishima; Hisashi Matsushita
- Platform: TurboGrafx-16
- Release: NA: October 1992; JP: December 12, 1992
- Genre: Scrolling shooter
- Mode: Single-player

Air Zonk (Note: Known in Japan as PC Denjin (PC電人)) is a 1992 scrolling shooter video game developed by Red Company with assistance from Naxat Soft and published by Hudson Soft for the TurboGrafx-16. It was an effort to update the company's image with a modern, punkish character named Zonk, who bears a deliberate resemblance to the TurboGrafx-16's caveman mascot, Bonk.

The game was developed by Red Company, the original creators of the Bonk series, and also known for their Gate of Thunder series. Air Zonk features King Drool, the antagonist of the Bonk series, along with many other enemies from that series. A sequel, Super Air Zonk: Rockabilly-Paradise, was released in 1993 for the TurboDuo and has been made available on the Wii's Virtual Console.

== Gameplay ==
Air Zonk is a reimagining of the Bonk video game series as a scrolling shooter set in the future. Artistically, the game is lighthearted, featuring humorous designs for the environment and characters. Throughout the five levels, the gameplay focuses on the effective use of shooting and bombing to complete each stage. At the start, the player may choose a companion character to team up with, such as an anthropomorphic gumball machine or a mummy with a drill attached to its head, in order to enhance Zonk's powers. Players can limit the use of designated companion characters for each level or opt not to use them at all. Each companion character, or friend, can only be used once. Air Zonk adopts the distinct visual style sometimes referred to as a "cute 'em up." There are three difficulty settings: sweet, spicy, and bitter.

Zonk can charge his shots, allowing him to fire a more powerful attack. A longer charge causes Zonk to drop a bomb, which damages all enemies on the screen. Zonk can also acquire seven types of power-ups, each of which can be charged for a unique special attack. As with most scrolling shooters, whenever Zonk acquires a new power-up, he loses the current one. If Zonk is hit while holding a power-up, he loses it but does not die, except in the case of the Mini-Zonk power-up. The Mini-Zonk power-up differs from other power-ups in that it cannot be charged and can be found in both florets and random enemy drops (while other power-ups can only be found in florets).

Zonk begins each stage alone and without power-ups. He must collect eight smiley faces, the eighth of which will appear in giant form with sunglasses, in order to summon his friend. Initially, the friend acts as a Gradius-style support, following Zonk and shooting projectiles. If the player collects another eight smiley faces, Zonk and his friend will merge into a hybrid form, granting a new attack and 20 seconds of invulnerability. This new attack cannot be charged, and Zonk cannot drop bombs while in hybrid form. Once invincibility expires, if Zonk is hit, he will revert to his normal form, and his friend will leave. However, Zonk retains any power-up he had before transforming into hybrid form.

== Release ==
Air Zonk was released on the Wii's Virtual Console in May 2007 in Japan, July in America, and on July 13 in Europe. It was also released on the Wii U's Virtual Console in Japan on June 19, 2014, in America on July 27, 2017, and in Europe on August 3.

== Reception ==
Reception

Aggregate score
Aggregator	Score
GameRankings	76.25%

Review scores
Publication	Score
Eurogamer	7/10
Famitsu	7/10, 6/10, 7/10, 5/10
GameSpot	7.5/10
Gekkan PC Engine	75/100, 85/100, 85/100, 80/100, 80/100
IGN	8/10
Joypad	91%
Joystick	91%
Marukatsu PC Engine	7/10, 7/10, 6/10, 4/10
Mega Fun	82/100
Nintendo Life	8/10
Player One	90%
Video Games (DE)	72%
VideoGames & Computer Entertainment	7/10
Go! Hand-Held Video Games	91/100
Hippon Super!	9/10
Play Time	85%

Award
Publication	Award
Electronic Gaming Monthly (1992)	TurboGrafx-16 Game of the Year

Air Zonk garnered generally favorable reception from critics, holding a rating of 76.25% based on four reviews according to review aggregator GameRankings. The game received a score of 23.74 out of 30 in a 1993 readers' poll conducted by PC Engine Fan, ranking among PC Engine titles at the number 55 spot. For their 1992 game awards, Electronic Gaming Monthly honored Air Zonk as their "Game of the Year" on the TurboGrafx-16.

== Legacy ==
Air Zonk received a sequel in 1993 titled Super Air Zonk: Rockabilly-Paradise (also known as CD Denjin Rockabilly), which was released in the SuperCD format and requires the Super System Card to play on first-generation TurboGrafx-CD consoles. As its name suggests, the game features a CD audio soundtrack consisting of rockabilly music. The game includes all-new levels, assistants, and enemies.
