= China Warrior =

1987 video game

- North American box art
- Developer: Hudson Soft
- Publishers: JP: Hudson Soft; NA: NEC
- Composer: Daisuke Inoue
- Platforms: TurboGrafx 16, mobile phone
- Release: JP: November 21, 1987; NA: November 1989
- Genre: Beat 'em up
- Mode: Single-player

China Warrior, known as The Kung Fu (Note: Japanese: ザ・クンフー, Hepburn: Za Kunfū) (THE 功夫) in Japan, is a beat 'em up video game created in 1987 by Hudson Soft for the TurboGrafx-16. The game received mixed reviews upon release, with praise for its large sprite graphics but criticism towards its gameplay.

The game was ported to mobile phones and the Hudson Channel for the PlayStation 2 exclusively in Japan with redone graphics, audio, and gameplay. The PC Engine version was also released for the Wii's, Nintendo 3DS's, and Wii U's Virtual Console and on the Japanese PlayStation Store.

== Plot ==
A Chinese martial artist named Wang (王（ワン）), whose style resembles that of Bruce Lee, embarks on a mission to bring down opposing enemies and the Dark Emperor, who stands atop the castle Luo Yang Ge (洛陽閣（ルーヤンカク）) in China.

== Gameplay ==
The object of the game is to walk through each stage while throwing punches and kicks at enemies and objects, which also can be done in midair. There are four levels which are broken down into three stages each, for a total of twelve stages. When Wang gets knocked out, the game starts over at the beginning of the stage in which he got knocked out. Players can memorize the object/enemy pattern in order to get through the stage more easily whenever Wang gets knocked out. At the end of each level, there is a boss fight.

The gameplay and controls are similar to Irem's arcade game Kung-Fu Master (1984), with gameplay also similar to Taito's Gladiator (1986) without the sword or shield held in hand. The graphics utilized very large character models that fill up the screen. They were capable of moving without any graphical flickering.

== Reception ==
Reception

Review scores
Publication	Score
Computer and Video Games	58%, 76%
Electronic Gaming Monthly	4/10, 4/10, 5/10, 5/10
Eurogamer	1/10
Game Informer	3.5/10
GameSpot	1.5/10
IGN	1.5/10
Nintendo Life	2/10
The Games Machine (UK)	63%
Game Zone	3/5
Excalibur	45%
Power Play	67/100

China Warrior received a 16.68/30 score in a 1993 readers' poll conducted by PC Engine Fan, ranking among PC Engine titles at the number 474 spot. The game garnered generally unfavorable reviews from critics.

Computer and Video Games reviewed Drunken Master for the PC Engine, giving it a 58% score. They praised the "giant-sized sprites" as "very impressive on this horizontally scrolling kung-fu game" but said "only three moves result in the game becoming ultimately dull". Electronic Gaming Monthly criticized its simple gameplay and Bruceploitation but praised for the large character sprites.

Upon its release for the Wii Virtual Console in 2007, IGN denounced the game for its overly limiting gameplay, forcing the player to constantly move right. In addition, while the graphical advancements of the game were prominent, many felt that they were not substantial enough to pardon the game's critical flaws. In the game's review for Wii's Virtual Console, IGN and GameSpot gave the game an abysmal review, citing bad graphics and repetitive gameplay, among other things. The game was also featured in 1UP's "Broken Pixels", a show dedicated to mocking bad video games. Michael Plasket of Hardcore Gaming 101 said it is "probably best treated as little more than a tech demo for the potential of the TurboGrafx-16 instead of a legitimately entertaining game".
