= Bonk's Revenge =

1991 video game

- North American TurboGrafx-16 box art
- Developers: Red Company; Mutech
- Publishers: JP: Hudson Soft; NA: NEC
- Composer: Hirohiko Takayama
- Series: Bonk
- Platforms: TurboGrafx-16, Game Boy
- Release: TurboGrafx-16: JP: July 19, 1991; NA: August 1991; EU: 1991; Game Boy: JP: October 21, 1994; NA: November 1994; EU: 1994
- Genre: Platform
- Mode: Single-player

Bonk's Revenge, known as PC-Genjin 2 (Note: Japanese: PC-原人 2, Hepburn: PC-Genjin Tsū; lit. "PC-Caveman 2") in Japan and PC Kid 2 in Europe, is a 2D platformer set in prehistory, originally for the PC Engine/TurboGrafx-16 console, created in 1991 by the Red Company for Hudson Soft, and licensed by NEC. This is the second title in the Bonk series, and was re-released for the TurboGrafx-16 in 1992 on the Gate of Thunder 4-in-1 game CD-ROM. A completely different game with the same name appeared on the Game Boy, whereas the original version was re-released for Wii Virtual Console. It was released in Japan on Windows Store on December 13, 2013, and on Wii U Virtual Console on March 12, 2014. The title is also playable on the Turbografx-16/PC Engine Mini Console.

== Gameplay ==
This time, the titular large-headed caveman is on a quest to recover half of the Moon, the home of the monarch of the dinosaur kingdom Princess Za, which was stolen by the evil King Drool III to turn into his own kingdom. Its multiple stages each contain several specific areas, which range from outdoors to trains to space to underwater. As in most platformers, Bonk has several crucial abilities: the I button causes him to jump; the II button causes him to "bonk", an action in which Bonk slams his head forward, inflicting a killing blow on most enemies; I jump-II combo causes Bonk to headbutt the Earth, killing enemies he lands on and creating a damaging shock wave; holding down the II button in midair causes Bonk to spin and hover, allowing for long, controlled jumps. Bonk can also use his large mouth to grip onto certain surfaces for climbing.

Bonk's health is reflected in heart containers, similar to games in the Zelda series. Taking damage will cause Bonk to lose a certain amount of hearts, and hearts can be refilled through items, such as fruit. Bonk can also obtain blue hearts that grant him extra heart containers, allowing him to gain more health as the game progresses. The game also features Smileys, similar to coins in the Mario series, which are helpful if the player reaches the bonus round after fighting a boss. Bonk can also become invincible when he collects a large meat or two small meats, and can gain an extra life when he acquires a miniature model of himself.

== Power-up forms ==
Bonk can power-up and change into various forms by eating meat. With one small piece of meat, when he Bonks, a cloud floats towards enemies, freezing them when they come in contact. When he spins in the air, a cloud surrounds him. When he lands on his head, it freezes all enemies on-screen. With an additional small piece or one large piece, he becomes fully powered up and is temporarily invincible. In this form, he breathes fire, which destroys any enemies that come into contact with it. When spinning, he is surrounded by fire, and when he lands, it causes damage to all enemies, and instantly destroys most of them on-screen.

== Variations in gameplay ==
In the Game Boy version, Bonk can turn into one of three unique heroes: Master Bonk, Hungry Bonk, or Stealth Bonk. Becoming Master Bonk dresses Bonk in a cape, provides him with Vulcan-like ears, and gives him the ability to move faster and jump higher. Becoming Hungry Bonk gives Bonk an animalistic appearance with evil eyes and a mouth full of razor-sharp teeth, and allows him to chew enemies to death, as well as providing him with a much stronger headbutt that can kill nearby enemies. Becoming Stealth Bonk dresses Bonk in a striped jail outfit, and gives him the ability to enter special locked doors that lead to areas such as the bank, where Bonk can collect Smileys, the butcher's, where Bonk can eat more slabs of meat for a different power-up, and jail, where Bonk loses a portion of his Smileys.

Grabbing one of many tulips scattered throughout the game carries Bonk to a special bonus stage where he can face off against Mechabonk -- a RoboCop-like version of Bonk—in a best-of-three battle to "bonk" one another off the edge of a small stage. Winning two rounds provides Bonk with an extra life, while a loss transforms Bonk into Wounded Bonk, where Bonk resembles a mummy and takes twice as much damage as usual.

The game overall is very similar to the Mario series, providing linear, side-scrolling action, multiple power-ups, and several small boss confrontations leading up to a final boss. Its treatment of power-ups is similar as well: taking a hit while powered-up causes Bonk to not suffer damage, but instead lose his power. The game also has a password system.

== Reception ==
In the United Kingdom, PC Kid 2 was the top-selling PC Engine game in September 1991.

Reviewing the Game Boy version, GamePro commented that the game is fun, but too short and easy. Entertainment Weekly gave the game a B. French gaming magazine Joypad gave PC Kid II a 97% score.
