= Shiho Kikuchi =

Japanese voice actress (born 1972)

- 菊池 志穂
- Born: May 6, 1972 (age 54); Kanagawa Prefecture, Japan
- Occupation: Voice actress
- Years active: 1990–present
- Agent: Remax
- Height: 160 cm (5 ft 3 in)

Shiho Kikuchi (菊池 志穂, Kikuchi Shiho; born May 6, 1972) is a Japanese voice actress from Kanagawa Prefecture, Japan.

== Filmography ==
=== Anime ===
Unknown date

- Ayakashi Ninden Kunoichiban – Kaede Hagakure
- Beyblade – Hiromi Tachibana
- Galerians: Ash – Lilia Pascalle
- Martian Successor Nadesico – Hikaru Amano
- Martian Successor Nadesico: The Prince of Darkness – Hikaru Amano
- Mazinkaiser vs. Great General of Darkness – Roll
- Meltylancer – Patricia MacGarren
- Papillion Rose – Tsubomi
- Princess Rouge: Legend of the Last Labyrinth (1997) – Princess Rouge
- Stratos 4 – Ayamo Nakamura
- Vandread – Amarone Slantheav

=== Video games ===
- Tokimeki Memorial (1994) – Miharu Tatebayashi
- Tekken 2 (1995) – Jun Kazama, Kunimitsu
- Harmful Park (1997) – Lesca
- Dodge De Bell! (1998) – Kyoko Ageha
- Tekken Tag Tournament (1999) – Jun Kazama, Kunimitsu
- The King of Fighters '99 (1999) – Whip
- The King of Fighters 2000 (2000) – Whip
- Eithea (2001) – Hikaru Ito
- The King of Fighters 2001 (2001) – Whip
- The King of Fighters 2002 (2002) – Whip
- Atelier Violet: The Alchemist of Gramnad 2 (2003) – Brigitt Sihern
- Puyo Pop Fever (2003) – Amitie
- The King of Fighters 2003 (2003) – Whip
- Puyo Puyo Fever 2 (2005) – Amitie
- The King of Fighters XI (2005) – Whip
- Super Robot Wars A Portable (2008) – Hikaru Amano
- Puyo Puyo Chronicle (2016) – Amitie
- Puyo Puyo! 15th Anniversary (2006) – Amitie
- Puyo Puyo 7 (2009) – Amitie
- Puyo Puyo Tetris (2014) – Amitie
- Puyo Puyo!! 20th Anniversary (2011) – Amitie
- Super Robot Wars V (2017) – Hikaru Amano
- The King of Fighters XIV (2017) – Whip
- Another Eden: The Cat Beyond Time and Space (2017) – Lovinia, Erina
- The King of Fighters All Star (2019) – Whip
- Super Robot Wars T (2019) – Hikaru Amano
- Puyo Puyo Tetris 2 (2020) – Amitie
- The King of Fighters XV (2022) – Whip
- Bomberman World (1998) – Cyclone Bomber
