= List of Sonic Team games =

Sonic Team is a Japanese video game development division of Sega. The initial team was composed of developers from Sega's Consumer Development division, including programmer Yuji Naka, artist Naoto Ohshima, and level designer Hirokazu Yasuhara. The team took the name Sonic Team in 1991 with the release of Sonic the Hedgehog for the Sega Genesis. The game was a major success, and started the long-running Sonic the Hedgehog franchise.

The next several games were developed by Naka and Yasuhara in America at Sega Technical Institute. In late 1994, Naka returned to Japan to become the head of CS3, later renamed R&D #8. During this time, the division was branded with the Sonic Team name but also developed games that do not feature Sonic, such as Nights into Dreams (1996) and Burning Rangers (1998). Following the release of Sonic Adventure in 1998, some Sonic Team staff moved to the United States to form Sonic Team USA and develop Sonic Adventure 2 (2001). With Sega's diversification of its studios, R&D #8 became Sonic Team in 2000, with Naka as CEO and Sonic Team USA as its subsidiary. Sega's financial troubles led to several major structural changes in the early 2000s, the United Game Artists studio was absorbed by Sonic Team in 2003, and Sonic Team USA became Sega Studios USA in 2004. After Sammy Corporation purchased Sega in 2005, Sonic Team was restructured to become Sega's GE1 research and development department, and later, CS2. As of 2019, Sonic Team is a team within CS2.

In addition to the Sonic series, the company has developed other games for Sega, such as Nights into Dreams (1996) and Billy Hatcher and the Giant Egg (2003). The 1991 release of Sonic the Hedgehog is considered significant in video game history, as it increased the Sega Genesis's sales and Sega displaced Nintendo as the leading video game company. Some Sonic Team games, such as the Sonic games and Nights, are considered among the greatest of all time.

On this list, games are gathered that are either on the official Japanese Sonic Team website or titles where it is officially mentioned that Sonic Team is involved. The website of Sonic Team has not been updated since 2015.

== Games ==
=== As R&D9 ===
| Game | Platforms | Release date | JP | NA | PAL | Role | Notes | Ref. |
|---|---|---|---|---|---|---|---|---|
| Sonic the Hedgehog | Sega Genesis | June 23, 1991 | Yes | Yes | Yes | Developer | | |

=== As CS R&D 3/R&D 8 ===
| Game | Platforms | Release date | JP | NA | PAL | Role | Notes | Ref. |
|---|---|---|---|---|---|---|---|---|
| Nights into Dreams | Sega Saturn | July 5, 1996 | Yes | Yes | Yes | Developer | | |
| Sonic 3D Blast | Sega Genesis | November 7, 1996 | No | Yes | Yes | Co-developer with Traveller's Tales | | |
| Sonic 3D Blast | Sega Saturn | November 20, 1996 | Yes | Yes | Yes | Co-developer with Traveller's Tales | Special Stages developed by Sonic Team | |
| Sonic Jam | Sega Saturn | June 20, 1997 | Yes | Yes | Yes | Developer | | |
| Sonic R | Sega Saturn | November 18, 1997 | Yes | Yes | Yes | Co-developer with Traveller's Tales | | |
| Sonic R | Windows | November 11, 1998 | Yes | Yes | Yes | Co-developer with Traveller's Tales | | |
| Burning Rangers | Sega Saturn | February 26, 1998 | Yes | Yes | Yes | Developer | | |
| Sonic Adventure | Dreamcast | December 23, 1998 | Yes | Yes | Yes | Developer | | |
| Sonic the Hedgehog Pocket Adventure | Neo Geo Pocket Color | December 4, 1999 | Yes | Yes | Yes | Supervisor | Developed by SNK | |
| ChuChu Rocket! | Dreamcast | November 11, 1999 | Yes | Yes | Yes | Developer | | |
| Space Channel 5 | Dreamcast | December 16, 1999 | Yes | Yes | Yes | Originally developed by United Game Artist | Retroactively credited, United Game Artist staff merged into Sonic Team in 2003 | |
| Samba de Amigo | Arcade | December 1999 | Yes | Yes | No | Developer | | |

=== As Sonic Team Ltd. ===
| Game | Platforms | Release date | JP | NA | PAL | Role | Notes | Ref. |
|---|---|---|---|---|---|---|---|---|
| Samba de Amigo | Dreamcast | April 27, 2000 | Yes | Yes | Yes | Developer | | |
| Phantasy Star Online | Dreamcast | December 21, 2000 | Yes | Yes | Yes | Developer | | |
| Phantasy Star Online | Windows | December 20, 2001 | Yes | No | No | Developer | Enhanced version subtitled Blue Burst, which includes a new exclusive episode, released in 2004. | |
| Phantasy Star Online | GameCube | September 12, 2002 | Yes | Yes | Yes | Developer | Includes more content, titled Phantasy Star Online Episode I & II. A Plus enhanced version was later published. | |
| Phantasy Star Online | Xbox | April 15, 2003 | Yes | Yes | Yes | Developer | Includes more content, titled Phantasy Star Online Episode I & II. | |
| Sonic Adventure 2 | Dreamcast | June 19, 2001 | Yes | Yes | Yes | Developer | Developed by Sonic Team USA | |
| Sonic Adventure 2 | GameCube | December 20, 2001 | Yes | Yes | Yes | Developer | Includes more content, titled Sonic Adventure 2 Battle. | |
| ChuChu Rocket! | Game Boy Advance | March 21, 2001 | Yes | Yes | Yes | Developer | | |
| Puyo Pop | Game Boy Advance | October 18, 2001 | Yes | Yes | Yes | Co-developer with Caret House | First game developed after acquiring the Puyo Puyo IP from Compile | |
| Rez | PlayStation 2 | November 22, 2001 | Yes | Yes | Yes | Originally developed by United Game Artist | Retroactively credited, United Game Artist staff merged into Sonic Team in 2003 | |
| Space Channel 5: Part 2 | PlayStation 2 | February 14, 2002 | Yes | Yes | Yes | Originally developed by United Game Artist | Retroactively credited, United Game Artist staff merged into Sonic Team in 2003 | |
| Sonic Advance | Game Boy Advance | December 20, 2001 | Yes | Yes | Yes | Co-developer with Dimps | | |
| Sonic Mega Collection | GameCube | November 10, 2002 | Yes | Yes | Yes | Developer | Games were compiled by VR-1 Japan | |
| Sonic Mega Collection | PlayStation 2 | November 2, 2004 | Yes | Yes | Yes | Developer | Includes more content, titled Sonic Mega Collection Plus. | |
| Sonic Mega Collection | Xbox | November 2, 2004 | Yes | Yes | Yes | Developer | Includes more content, titled Sonic Mega Collection Plus. | |
| Sonic Advance 2 | Game Boy Advance | December 19, 2002 | Yes | Yes | Yes | Co-developer with Dimps | | |
| Sonic Pinball Party | Game Boy Advance | June 1, 2003 | Yes | Yes | Yes | Co-developer with Jupiter | | |
| Sonic Adventure: DX Director's Cut | GameCube | June 17, 2003 | Yes | Yes | Yes | Co-developer with Now Production | | |
| Sonic Adventure: DX Director's Cut | Windows | December 18, 2003 | Yes | Yes | Yes | Co-developer with Now Production | | |
| Billy Hatcher and the Giant Egg | GameCube | September 23, 2003 | Yes | Yes | Yes | Developer | | |
| Puyo Pop Fever | Arcade | November 26, 2003 | Yes | No | No | Co-developer with MileStone Inc. | | |
| Puyo Pop Fever | PlayStation 2 | February 4, 2004 | Yes | No | Yes | Developer | | |
| Puyo Pop Fever | Dreamcast | February 24, 2004 | Yes | No | No | Developer | | |
| Puyo Pop Fever | GameCube | February 27, 2004 | Yes | Yes | Yes | Developer | | |
| Puyo Pop Fever | Xbox | February 27, 2004 | Yes | No | Yes | Developer | | |
| Puyo Pop Fever | Mac OS X | June 24, 2004 | Yes | No | No | Developer | | |
| Puyo Pop Fever | Game Boy Advance | July 24, 2004 | Yes | No | Yes | Developer | | |
| Puyo Pop Fever | Windows | September 24, 2004 | Yes | No | Yes | Developer | | |
| Puyo Pop Fever | Pocket PC | October 24, 2004 | Yes | No | No | Developer | | |
| Puyo Pop Fever | Nintendo DS | December 24, 2004 | Yes | Yes | Yes | Developer | | |
| Puyo Pop Fever | PlayStation Portable | December 24, 2004 | Yes | No | Yes | Developer | | |
| Phantasy Star Online Episode III: C.A.R.D. Revolution | GameCube | November 27, 2003 | Yes | Yes | Yes | Developer | | |
| Sonic Heroes | PlayStation 2 | December 4, 2003 | Yes | Yes | Yes | Developer | Developed by Sonic Team USA | |
| Sonic Heroes | GameCube | December 4, 2003 | Yes | Yes | Yes | Developer | Developed by Sonic Team USA | |
| Sonic Heroes | Xbox | December 4, 2003 | Yes | Yes | Yes | Developer | Developed by Sonic Team USA | |
| Sonic Battle | Game Boy Advance | December 30, 2003 | Yes | Yes | Yes | Developer | | |
| Astro Boy | PlayStation 2 | April 18, 2004 | Yes | Yes | Yes | Co-developer with Tezuka Productions | | |
| Sonic Advance 3 | Game Boy Advance | June 7, 2004 | Yes | Yes | Yes | Co-developer with Dimps | | |
| Sega Superstars | PlayStation 2 | October 22, 2004 | Yes | Yes | Yes | Developer | | |

=== As GE R&D 1 ===
| Game | Platforms | Release date | JP | NA | PAL | Role | Notes | Ref. |
|---|---|---|---|---|---|---|---|---|
| Feel the Magic: XY/XX | Nintendo DS | November 16, 2004 | Yes | Yes | Yes | Developer | | |
| Sonic Gems Collection | PlayStation 2 | August 11, 2005 | Yes | No | Yes | Developer | Games were compiled by VR-1 Japan | |
| Sonic Gems Collection | GameCube | August 11, 2005 | Yes | Yes | Yes | Developer | Games were compiled by VR-1 Japan | |
| The Rub Rabbits! | Nintendo DS | October 20, 2005 | Yes | Yes | Yes | Developer | | |
| Shadow the Hedgehog | PlayStation 2 | November 15, 2005 | Yes | Yes | Yes | Developer | Developed by Sega Studios USA | |
| Shadow the Hedgehog | GameCube | November 15, 2005 | Yes | Yes | Yes | Developer | Developed by Sega Studios USA | |
| Shadow the Hedgehog | Xbox | November 15, 2005 | Yes | Yes | Yes | Developer | Developed by Sega Studios USA | |
| Sonic Rush | Nintendo DS | November 15, 2005 | Yes | Yes | Yes | Co-developer with Dimps | | |
| Puyo Puyo Fever 2 | PlayStation 2 | November 24, 2005 | Yes | No | No | Developer | | |
| Puyo Puyo Fever 2 | PlayStation Portable | November 24, 2005 | Yes | No | No | Developer | | |
| Puyo Puyo Fever 2 | Nintendo DS | December 24, 2005 | Yes | No | No | Developer | | |
| Sonic Riders | PlayStation 2 | February 21, 2006 | Yes | Yes | Yes | Co-developer with Now Production | | |
| Sonic Riders | GameCube | February 21, 2006 | Yes | Yes | Yes | Co-developer with Now Production | | |
| Sonic Riders | Xbox | February 21, 2006 | Yes | Yes | Yes | Co-developer with Now Production | | |
| Sonic Riders | Windows | November 17, 2006 | No | Yes | Yes | Co-developer with Now Production | | |
| Jukugon | PlayStation Portable | July 13, 2006 | Yes | No | No | Developer | | |
| Mind Quiz: Your Brain Coach | Nintendo DS | September 14, 2006 | Yes | Yes | Yes | Developer | | |
| Sonic the Hedgehog (2006) | Xbox 360 | November 14, 2006 | Yes | Yes | Yes | Developer | | |
| Sonic the Hedgehog (2006) | PlayStation 3 | December 21, 2006 | Yes | Yes | Yes | Developer | | |
| Puyo Puyo! 15th Anniversary | Nintendo DS | December 14, 2006 | Yes | No | No | Developer | | |
| Puyo Puyo! 15th Anniversary | PlayStation 2 | March 21, 2007 | Yes | No | No | Developer | | |
| Puyo Puyo! 15th Anniversary | PlayStation Portable | March 21, 2007 | Yes | No | No | Developer | | |
| Puyo Puyo! 15th Anniversary | Wii | July 26, 2007 | Yes | No | No | Developer | | |
| Mario & Sonic at the Olympic Games | Wii | November 22, 2007 | Yes | Yes | Yes | Supervisor | Developed by Sega Sports R&D | |
| Mario & Sonic at the Olympic Games | Nintendo DS | January 17, 2008 | Yes | Yes | Yes | Supervisor | Developed by Sega Sports R&D | |
| Sonic and the Secret Rings | Wii | February 20, 2007 | Yes | Yes | Yes | Developer | | |
| Onsei Kanjou Sokuteiki: Kokoro Scan | Nintendo DS | August 16, 2007 | Yes | No | No | Developer | | |
| Sonic Rush Adventure | Nintendo DS | September 13, 2007 | Yes | Yes | Yes | Co-developer with Dimps | | |
| Nights: Journey of Dreams | Wii | December 13, 2007 | Yes | Yes | Yes | Developer | Developed by Sega Studios USA | |
| Sonic Riders: Zero Gravity | PlayStation 2 | January 8, 2008 | No | Yes | Yes | Co-developer with O-Two | | |
| Sonic Riders: Zero Gravity | Wii | January 8, 2008 | Yes | Yes | Yes | Co-developer with O-Two | | |

=== As GE R&D 3 ===
| Game | Platforms | Release date | JP | NA | PAL | Role |
|---|---|---|---|---|---|---|
| Phantasy Star Universe | PlayStation 2 | August 31, 2006 | Yes | Yes | Yes | Developer |
| Phantasy Star Universe | Windows | August 31, 2006 | Yes | Yes | Yes | Developer |
| Phantasy Star Universe | Xbox 360 | October 25, 2006 | Yes | Yes | Yes | Developer |
| Phantasy Star Portable | PlayStation Portable | July 31, 2008 | Yes | Yes | Yes | Co-developer with Alfa System |

=== As CS2 ===
| Game | Platforms | Release date | JP | NA | PAL | Role | Notes | Ref. |
|---|---|---|---|---|---|---|---|---|
| Sonic Unleashed | PlayStation 2 | November 18, 2008 | No | Yes | Yes | Co-developer with Dimps, O-Two | | |
| Sonic Unleashed | Wii | November 18, 2008 | Yes | Yes | Yes | Co-developer with Dimps | | |
| Sonic Unleashed | Xbox 360 | November 18, 2008 | Yes | Yes | Yes | Developer | | |
| Sonic Unleashed | PlayStation 3 | December 9, 2008 | Yes | Yes | Yes | Developer | | |
| Nights Into Dreams | PlayStation 2 | February 21, 2008 | Yes | Yes | Yes | Supervisor | Developed by Sega Shanghai Studio | |
| Nights Into Dreams | Xbox 360 | October 5, 2012 | Yes | Yes | Yes | Supervisor | Developed by Sega Shanghai Studio | |
| Nights Into Dreams | PlayStation 3 | October 5, 2012 | Yes | Yes | Yes | Supervisor | Developed by Sega Shanghai Studio | |
| Nights Into Dreams | Windows | October 5, 2012 | Yes | Yes | Yes | Supervisor | Developed by Sega Shanghai Studio | |
| Sonic and the Black Knight | Wii | March 3, 2009 | Yes | Yes | Yes | Developer | | |
| Mario & Sonic at the Winter Olympic Games | Wii | November 5, 2009 | Yes | Yes | Yes | Supervisor | Developed by Sega CS2 | |
| Mario & Sonic at the Winter Olympic Games | Nintendo DS | November 5, 2009 | Yes | Yes | Yes | Supervisor | Developed by Sega CS2 | |
| Puyo Puyo 7 | Nintendo DS | July 30, 2009 | Yes | No | No | Co-developer with h.a.n.d. | | |
| Puyo Puyo 7 | PlayStation Portable | November 26, 2009 | Yes | No | No | Co-developer with h.a.n.d. | | |
| Puyo Puyo 7 | Wii | November 26, 2009 | Yes | No | No | Co-developer with h.a.n.d. | | |
| Sonic the Hedgehog 4: Episode I | Wii | October 11, 2010 | Yes | Yes | Yes | Co-developer with Dimps | | |
| Sonic the Hedgehog 4: Episode I | PlayStation 3 | October 12, 2010 | Yes | Yes | Yes | Co-developer with Dimps | | |
| Sonic the Hedgehog 4: Episode I | Xbox 360 | October 13, 2010 | Yes | Yes | Yes | Co-developer with Dimps | | |
| Sonic Free Riders | Xbox 360 | November 4, 2010 | Yes | Yes | Yes | Co-developer with O-Two | | |
| Sonic Colors | Wii | November 11, 2010 | Yes | Yes | Yes | Developer | | |
| Sonic Colors | Nintendo DS | November 11, 2010 | Yes | Yes | Yes | Co-developer with Dimps | | |
| Sonic Colors | Nintendo Switch | September 7, 2021 | Yes | Yes | Yes | Co-developer with Blind Squirrel Games | Includes more content, titled Sonic Colors Ultimate. | |
| Sonic Colors | PlayStation 4 | September 7, 2021 | Yes | Yes | Yes | Co-developer with Blind Squirrel Games | Includes more content, titled Sonic Colors Ultimate. | |
| Sonic Colors | Xbox One | September 7, 2021 | Yes | Yes | Yes | Co-developer with Blind Squirrel Games | Includes more content, titled Sonic Colors Ultimate. | |
| Sonic Colors | Windows | September 7, 2021 | Yes | Yes | Yes | Co-developer with Blind Squirrel Games | Includes more content, titled Sonic Colors Ultimate. | |
| Mario & Sonic at the London 2012 Olympic Games | Wii | November 15, 2011 | Yes | Yes | Yes | Supervisor | Developed by Sega CS2 | |
| Mario & Sonic at the London 2012 Olympic Games | Nintendo 3DS | February 9, 2012 | Yes | Yes | Yes | Supervisor | Developed by Sega CS2 | |
| Puyo Puyo 20th Anniversary | Nintendo DS | July 14, 2011 | Yes | No | No | Co-developer with h.a.n.d. | | |
| Puyo Puyo 20th Anniversary | PlayStation Portable | December 15, 2011 | Yes | No | No | Co-developer with O-Two | | |
| Puyo Puyo 20th Anniversary | Wii | December 15, 2011 | Yes | No | No | Co-developer with O-Two | | |
| Puyo Puyo 20th Anniversary | Nintendo 3DS | December 15, 2011 | Yes | No | No | Co-developer with h.a.n.d. | | |
| Sonic Generations | PlayStation 3 | November 1, 2011 | Yes | Yes | Yes | Developer | | |
| Sonic Generations | Xbox 360 | November 1, 2011 | Yes | Yes | Yes | Developer | | |
| Sonic Generations | Windows | November 3, 2011 | No | Yes | Yes | Developer | | |
| Sonic Generations | Nintendo 3DS | November 22, 2011 | Yes | Yes | Yes | Co-developer with Dimps | | |
| Sonic Generations | PlayStation 4 | October 25, 2024 | Yes | Yes | Yes | Developer | Includes more content, titled Sonic X Shadow Generations. | |
| Sonic Generations | PlayStation 5 | October 25, 2024 | Yes | Yes | Yes | Developer | Includes more content, titled Sonic X Shadow Generations. | |
| Sonic Generations | Xbox One | October 25, 2024 | Yes | Yes | Yes | Developer | Includes more content, titled Sonic X Shadow Generations. | |
| Sonic Generations | Xbox Series X/S | October 25, 2024 | Yes | Yes | Yes | Developer | Includes more content, titled Sonic X Shadow Generations. | |
| Sonic Generations | Nintendo Switch | October 25, 2024 | Yes | Yes | Yes | Developer | Includes more content, titled Sonic X Shadow Generations. | |
| Sonic Generations | Windows | October 25, 2024 | Yes | Yes | Yes | Developer | Includes more content, titled Sonic X Shadow Generations. | |
| Sonic Generations | Nintendo Switch 2 | June 5, 2025 | Yes | Yes | Yes | Developer | Includes more content, titled Sonic X Shadow Generations. | |
| Sonic the Hedgehog 4: Episode II | PlayStation 3 | May 15, 2012 | Yes | Yes | Yes | Co-developer with Dimps | | |
| Sonic the Hedgehog 4: Episode II | Xbox 360 | May 16, 2012 | Yes | Yes | Yes | Co-developer with Dimps | | |
| Mario & Sonic at the Sochi 2014 Olympic Winter Games | Wii U | November 8, 2013 | Yes | Yes | Yes | Supervisor | Developed by Sega CS2 | |
| Sonic Lost World | Wii U | October 18, 2013 | Yes | Yes | Yes | Developer | | |
| Sonic Lost World | Nintendo 3DS | October 18, 2013 | Yes | Yes | Yes | Co-developer with Dimps | | |
| Sonic Lost World | Windows | November 2, 2015 | Yes | Yes | Yes | Developer | | |
| Puyo Puyo Tetris | PlayStation 3 | February 6, 2014 | Yes | No | No | Co-developer with O-Two | | |
| Puyo Puyo Tetris | Nintendo 3DS | February 6, 2014 | Yes | No | No | Co-developer with O-Two | | |
| Puyo Puyo Tetris | PlayStation Vita | February 6, 2014 | Yes | No | No | Co-developer with O-Two | | |
| Puyo Puyo Tetris | Wii U | February 6, 2014 | Yes | No | No | Co-developer with O-Two | | |
| Puyo Puyo Tetris | Xbox One | December 4, 2014 | Yes | No | No | Developer | | |
| Puyo Puyo Tetris | PlayStation 4 | December 4, 2014 | Yes | Yes | Yes | Developer | | |
| Puyo Puyo Tetris | Nintendo Switch | March 3, 2017 | Yes | Yes | Yes | Developer | | |
| Puyo Puyo Tetris | Windows | February 27, 2018 | Yes | Yes | Yes | Developer | | |
| Sonic Boom: Rise of Lyric | Wii U | November 11, 2014 | Yes | Yes | Yes | Supervisor | Developed by Big Red Button | |
| Sonic Boom: Shattered Crystal | Nintendo 3DS | November 11, 2014 | Yes | Yes | Yes | Supervisor | Developed by Sanzaru Games | |
| Sonic Runners | Mobile | February 25, 2015 | Yes | Yes | Yes | Developer | Discontinued on July 27, 2016. | |
| Sonic Mania | Windows | August 15, 2017 | Yes | Yes | Yes | Supervisor | Developed by Christian Whitehead, PadogaWest Games and Headcanoon | |
| Sonic Mania | Nintendo Switch | August 15, 2017 | Yes | Yes | Yes | Supervisor | Developed by Christian Whitehead, PadogaWest Games and Headcanoon | |
| Sonic Mania | PlayStation 4 | August 15, 2017 | Yes | Yes | Yes | Supervisor | Developed by Christian Whitehead, PadogaWest Games and Headcanoon | |
| Sonic Mania | Xbox One | August 15, 2017 | Yes | Yes | Yes | Supervisor | Developed by Christian Whitehead, PadogaWest Games and Headcanoon | |
| Sonic Forces | Windows | November 7, 2017 | Yes | Yes | Yes | Developer | | |
| Sonic Forces | Nintendo Switch | November 7, 2017 | Yes | Yes | Yes | Developer | | |
| Sonic Forces | PlayStation 4 | November 7, 2017 | Yes | Yes | Yes | Developer | | |
| Sonic Forces | Xbox One | November 7, 2017 | Yes | Yes | Yes | Developer | | |
| Sakura Wars | PlayStation 4 | December 12, 2019 | Yes | Yes | Yes | Co-developer with Sega CS2 | Developed the battle portion, and lent the Hedgehog Engine 2 | |
| Sonic Origins | Nintendo Switch | June 23, 2022 | Yes | Yes | Yes | Developer | Games ported by Headcannon and Christian Whitehead | |
| Sonic Origins | PlayStation 4 | June 23, 2022 | Yes | Yes | Yes | Developer | Games ported by Headcannon and Christian Whitehead | |
| Sonic Origins | PlayStation 5 | June 23, 2022 | Yes | Yes | Yes | Developer | Games ported by Headcannon and Christian Whitehead | |
| Sonic Origins | Xbox One | June 23, 2022 | Yes | Yes | Yes | Developer | Games ported by Headcannon and Christian Whitehead | |
| Sonic Origins | Xbox Series X/S | June 23, 2022 | Yes | Yes | Yes | Developer | Games ported by Headcannon and Christian Whitehead | |
| Sonic Origins | Windows | June 23, 2022 | Yes | Yes | Yes | Developer | Games ported by Headcannon and Christian Whitehead | |
| Sonic Frontiers | Nintendo Switch | November 8, 2022 | Yes | Yes | Yes | Developer | | |
| Sonic Frontiers | PlayStation 4 | November 8, 2022 | Yes | Yes | Yes | Developer | | |
| Sonic Frontiers | PlayStation 5 | November 8, 2022 | Yes | Yes | Yes | Developer | | |
| Sonic Frontiers | Xbox One | November 8, 2022 | Yes | Yes | Yes | Developer | | |
| Sonic Frontiers | Xbox Series X/S | November 8, 2022 | Yes | Yes | Yes | Developer | | |
| Sonic Frontiers | Windows | November 8, 2022 | Yes | Yes | Yes | Developer | | |
| Sonic Frontiers | Nintendo Switch 2 | June 23, 2026 | Yes | Yes | Yes | Developer | | |
| Sonic Superstars | Nintendo Switch | October 17, 2023 | Yes | Yes | Yes | Co-developer with Arzest | | |
| Sonic Superstars | PlayStation 4 | October 17, 2023 | Yes | Yes | Yes | Co-developer with Arzest | | |
| Sonic Superstars | PlayStation 5 | October 17, 2023 | Yes | Yes | Yes | Co-developer with Arzest | | |
| Sonic Superstars | Xbox One | October 17, 2023 | Yes | Yes | Yes | Co-developer with Arzest | | |
| Sonic Superstars | Xbox Series X/S | October 17, 2023 | Yes | Yes | Yes | Co-developer with Arzest | | |
| Sonic Superstars | Windows | October 17, 2023 | Yes | Yes | Yes | Co-developer with Arzest | | |
| Shadow Generations | Nintendo Switch | October 25, 2024 | Yes | Yes | Yes | Developer | | |
| Shadow Generations | PlayStation 4 | October 25, 2024 | Yes | Yes | Yes | Developer | | |
| Shadow Generations | PlayStation 5 | October 25, 2024 | Yes | Yes | Yes | Developer | | |
| Shadow Generations | Xbox One | October 25, 2024 | Yes | Yes | Yes | Developer | | |
| Shadow Generations | Xbox Series X/S | October 25, 2024 | Yes | Yes | Yes | Developer | | |
| Shadow Generations | Windows | October 25, 2024 | Yes | Yes | Yes | Developer | | |
| Shadow Generations | Nintendo Switch 2 | June 5, 2025 | Yes | Yes | Yes | Developer | | |
| Sonic Racing: CrossWorlds | Nintendo Switch | September 25, 2025 | Yes | Yes | Yes | Developer | Developed with Initial D arcade game series team | |
| Sonic Racing: CrossWorlds | PlayStation 4 | September 25, 2025 | Yes | Yes | Yes | Developer | Developed with Initial D arcade game series team | |
| Sonic Racing: CrossWorlds | PlayStation 5 | September 25, 2025 | Yes | Yes | Yes | Developer | Developed with Initial D arcade game series team | |
| Sonic Racing: CrossWorlds | Xbox One | September 25, 2025 | Yes | Yes | Yes | Developer | Developed with Initial D arcade game series team | |
| Sonic Racing: CrossWorlds | Xbox Series X/S | September 25, 2025 | Yes | Yes | Yes | Developer | Developed with Initial D arcade game series team | |
| Sonic Racing: CrossWorlds | Windows | September 25, 2025 | Yes | Yes | Yes | Developer | Developed with Initial D arcade game series team | |
| Sonic Racing: CrossWorlds | Nintendo Switch 2 | December 4, 2025 | Yes | Yes | Yes | Developer | Developed with Initial D arcade game series team | |

== See also ==
- List of Sega video games
