= Puyo Puyo Box =

2000 video game

- Developer(s): Compile
- Publisher(s): Compile; Sega (PSN)
- Series: Puyo Puyo
- Platform(s): PlayStation
- Release: PlayStation: JP: December 21, 2000
- Genre(s): Puzzle
- Mode(s): Single-player, multiplayer

Puyo Puyo Box (ぷよぷよBOX, Puyo Puyo Bokkusu) is a 2000 puzzle video game compilation developed by Compile for the PlayStation. It is Compile's last Puyo Puyo game before Sega, previously only owning the character rights, fully obtained the rights to the series. Puyo Puyo Box, being a compilation, primarily consists of earlier Puyo Puyo games, but also contains original content.

== Gameplay ==
Puyo Puyo Box has several game modes. It consists of the Sega Mega Drive (Genesis in the US) versions of Puyo Puyo and Puyo Puyo 2, as well as a Madō Monogatari-style quest mode in which the player plays as Arle Nadja and battles against members of the other cast in Puyo Puyo matches. It includes a Stage Clear mode in which the player has to face either 10, 20 or 30 opponents, as well as two multiplayer modes which can be played with either other players or AI substitutes.

For the Quest mode itself, it allows the player to customise the armoury in ways in which made Arle stronger with a double-edged sword effect. For example, the player could remove the Puyo Rings in order to beef up her attack at the expense of being unable to see the next pieces, and the amount of experience gained and gold won was relative to how big a chain was scored and how quickly the opponent was defeated.

The key point in the gameplay of Puyo Puyo BOX is that the player can choose a ruleset from either Puyo Puyo, Puyo Puyo 2 (with countering), Puyo Puyo Sun (with countering and Sun Puyos dropping after each counter), and Puyo Puyo~n (with countering and a special gauge, with a select number of specials for the player to choose before a game begins). This can effectively lead to four-player battles where each player plays with independent or mixed rules. The game also allows for team battles to take place.

== Legacy ==
Despite being the last of the series released by Compile, it enjoyed great success. One of the special multiplayer modes made available in this game, known as Treasure Mode, was later adapted in Puyo Puyo! 15th Anniversary as its Excavation Mode to pay homage to the idea.
