= Yuriko Fuchizaki =

Japanese actress (born 1968)

- 渕崎 ゆり子
- Born: December 5, 1968 (age 57); Ōta, Japan
- Other name: Fucchii (ふっちー)
- Education: Nihon University
- Occupations: Actress; voice actress
- Years active: 1970–present
- Agent: REMAX
- Height: 161 cm (5 ft 3 in)
- Children: 2

Yuriko Fuchizaki (渕崎 ゆり子, Fuchizaki Yuriko; born December 5, 1968) is a Japanese stage actress and voice actress from Ōta, Tokyo. She is a graduate of the College of Fine Arts at Nihon University. She then moved to Sigma Seven in 1991, and on July 1, 2003, she moved to her current agency, REMAX. From 1987 to early 1989, her roles were credited under her real name (渕崎 有里子) - the reading is unchanged.

Fuchizaki's roles often range from young boys to cute girls. Her representative roles include Retsu Seiba of Bakusou Kyoudai Let's & Go!!, Ibuki Yagami in Maison Ikkoku, Kazuma Tamura of Ojarumaru, Li Kohran in the Sakura Wars series, Anthy Himemiya in Revolutionary Girl Utena, and Loki in Mythical Detective Loki Ragnarok.

== Filmography ==
=== Television animation ===
1984

- Persia, the Magic Fairy (Kishin Shinokawa)
- Panzer World Galient (Chururu)

1985

- Pro Golfer Saru (Mashima Nekosuke)
- Musashi no Ken (Musashi Natsuki)

1986

- Anmitsu Hime (Manjuu)
- Doteraman (Onizou)
- Pastel Yumi, the Magic Idol (Keshimaru)
- Maison Ikkoku (Ibuki Yagami)

1987

- The Three Musketeers Anime (Mimi)
- Mami the Psychic (Noriko Momoi)
- City Hunter (Nagisa Matsumura)

1988

- Osomatsu-kun (Bara Nosei)

1989

- Aoi Blink (Rakururu)
- Obocchamakun (Tama No Koshi Tsuya Ko Sensei)
- Patlabor (Satoru)
- City Hunter 3 (Hitomi Takano)
- The Adventures of Peter Pan (Michael)
- Sally the Witch (1989) (Ayako)

1990

- Tasuke, the Samurai Cop (Ninomiya Kintaro)
- Oishinbo (Nishino Youko)
- Anpanman (Kemurinu)
- Chibi Maruko-chan (Hiroaki)
- Goddamn (Polignac, Josephine)
- Magical Angel Sweet Mint (Takuto, Waffle)
- My Daddy Long Legs (Emily)

1991

- Anime Himitsu no Hanazono (Jiein)
- Ekubo Ouji (Ekubo)
- City Hunter '91 (Mami Asaka)
- Jankenman (Genta)
- Dororonpa! (Daifuku Tera Anko)
- Magical Princess Minky Momo (Maria)
- Watashi to Watashi: Futari no Lotte (Martin)
- Warau Salesman (Ware Kan Machiko)

1992

- Tomatoman (Meronpurinsu, Kon Jr.)
- Sailor Moon (Sakiko)

1993

- Ghost Sweeper Mikami (Chiho)
- Little Women II: Jo's Boys (Rob)

1994

- Tonde Burin (Tonrariano the 3rd, Narrator)
- Soreike! Anpanman (Howaitokurimu Hime, Poporu)
- Sailor Moon S (Cyprine)

1995

- Zenki (Nasu Isshi)
- Nurse Angel Ririka SOS (Dewey)
- Bit the Cupid (Bit)

1996

- Soreike! Anpanman (Kotecchan, Supana-kun)
- Bakusō Kyōdai Let's & Go!! (Retsu Seiba)
- Rurouni Kenshin (Young Sanosuke Sagara)

1997

- Revolutionary Girl Utena (Anthy Himemiya)
- Grander Musashi (Rozumari)
- Ninpen Manmaru (Atsupirun)
- Bakusou Kyoudai Let's & Go WGP (Retsu Seiba)

1998

- Ojarumaru (Kazuma Tamura, Obaasan, Shufu, Kodomo, Okusan, Joou Ari)
- Bakusou Kyoudai Let's & Go MAX (Retsu Seiba, Minami Arai)

1999

- Shuukan!! Storyland (Kobayashi Mayumi, Ooshima Senka)
- Bomberman B-Daman Bakugaiden Victory (Hiroinbon)
- Ojamajo Doremi (Mimi)

2000

- Carried by the Wind: Tsukikage Ran (Sakura)
- Sakura Wars TV (Li Kohran)

2001

- Shaman King (Melos)
- Fruits Basket (Hiro Sohma)

2003

- Gunslinger Girl (Patrizia)
- Cheeky Angel (Yuusuke Yasuda)
- Human Crossing (Someya Satoshi)
- Pluster World (Tan-Q)
- The Mythical Detective Loki Ragnarok (Loki)
- Someday's Dreamers (Narrator of Instructional Video)

2004

- Kochira Katsushika-ku Kameari Kōen-mae Hashutsujo (Jiruba Kasutanetto)
- Shura no Mon (Oume)
- Monster (Young Petr Capek)
- Legendz (Halca Hepburn)

2005

- Ah! My Goddess (Megumi Morisato)
- The Snow Queen (Kurisuteine)

2006

- Ah! My Goddess: Flights of Fancy (Megumi Morisato)
- Pretty Cure Splash Star (Moop, Michiru Kiryu)
- We Were There (Yano's Mother)
- Kaiketsu Zorori (Pepero)
- Yōkai Ningen Bem (Kisaragi Ryouko)

2007

- Dinosaur King (Roto, Parapara)
- Maple Story (Zukka)

2008

- Ancient Ruler Dinosaur King DKidz Adventure: Pterosaur Legend (Roto, Parapara, Tatsunoanmo, Darutanian)

2009

- Kon'nichiwa Anne: Before Green Gables (Miss Keru)

2011

- Natsume's Book of Friends (Menashi No Youkai)

2012

- Digimon Fusion (Bakomon)
- Saint Seiya Omega (Nguyen)

2013

- Toriko (Sen Ryu)
- Case Closed (Toba Hatsuho)

2016

- Keijo!!!!!!!! (Ayako Sakashiro)

2017

- The Art of 18 (Mari Kaneda)

2024

- Banished from the Hero's Party (Mistorm)

=== Original video animation (OVA) ===
- Bastard!! (Rushe Renren)
- Gunbuster (Kimiko Higuchi)
- Oh My Goddess! (Megumi Morisato)
- Plastic Little (Tita)
- Sol Bianca (June Ashel)

=== Theatrical animation ===
- Adolescence of Utena (Anthy Himemiya)
- Ah! My Goddess: The Movie (Megumi Morisato)
- Akira (Kaori)
- Crayon Shin-chan: Adventure in Henderland (Topema Mappet)
- Kiki's Delivery Service (Ket)
- Night on the Galactic Railroad (Tadashi)

=== Video games ===
- Arc the Lad III (Theo)
- Azure Dreams (Patty, Weedy)
- Dragon Force (Reinhart of Tradnor)
- Eve: Burst Error (Misumi Kagawa)
- Eve: Burst Error Plus (Misumi Kagawa)
- Eve: Ghost Enemies (Misumi Kagawa)
- Kemono Friends 3 (Sanmoto Gorōzaemon)
- Kingdom Hearts (Wendy Darling)
- Klonoa 2: Lunatea's Veil (Leorina)
- Klonoa Beach Volleyball (Leorina)
- Klonoa Phantasy Reverie Series (Leorina)
- Mario + Rabbids Sparks of Hope ( Rabbid Peach, JEANIE)
- Puyo Puyo Fever 2 (Sig)
- Puyo Puyo! 15th Anniversary (Sig)
- Puyo Puyo 7 (Sig)
- Puyo Puyo!! 20th Anniversary (Sig, Black Sig)
- Puyo Puyo Tetris (Sig)
- Sakura Wars Series (Li Kohran)
- Shōjo Kakumei Utena: Itsuka Kakumeisareru Monogatari (Anthy Himemiya)
- Sword of the Berserk: Guts' Rage (Puck)
- Super Adventure Rockman (Cutman, Iceman)

=== Films ===
- Typhoon Club (Midori Morisaki)

=== Dubbing ===
==== Live-action ====
- The Blue Lagoon (1983 TBS edition), Young Emmeline (Elva Josephson)
- Cujo (1986 TBS edition), Tad Trenton (Danny Pintauro)
- Dune, Chani (Sean Young)
- Falling Down (1997 TV Asahi edition), Angie (Karina Arroyave)
- Hairspray, Tracy Turnblad (Nikki Blonsky)
- Kramer vs. Kramer, Billy Kramer (Justin Henry)
- The Lost World: Jurassic Park, Kelly Curtis (Vanessa Lee Chester)
- Mac and Me, Courtney (Tina Caspary)
- Mad Love, Casey Roberts (Drew Barrymore)
- Scooby-Doo, Velma Dinkley (Linda Cardellini)
- Scooby-Doo 2: Monsters Unleashed, Velma Dinkley (Linda Cardellini)
- Scream, Tatum Riley (Rose McGowan)
- Village of the Damned, David McGowen (Thomas Dekker)

==== Animation ====
- Peter Pan, Wendy Darling
