= Puyo Puyo Champions =

2018 video game

- Steam cover art
- Developer: Sega
- Publisher: Sega
- Director: Harumasa Nakajima
- Producer: Mizuki Hosoyamada
- Designer: Harumasa Nakajima
- Programmers: Koichi Nomura; Toshiyuki Ito
- Artist: Shinichi Moroka
- Composer: Jun Senoue
- Series: Puyo Puyo
- Platforms: Nintendo Switch; PlayStation 4 Xbox One; Microsoft Windows; Arcade
- Release: Nintendo Switch, PlayStation 4: JP/AS: October 25, 2018; WW: May 7, 2019; Xbox One: WW: May 7, 2019; Microsoft Windows: WW: May 7, 2019; JP/AS: May 8, 2019; Arcade: JP: April 18, 2019
- Genre: Puzzle
- Modes: Single-player, multiplayer

Puyo Puyo Champions (Puyo Puyo eSports (ぷよぷよeスポーツ) in Japan) is a 2018 puzzle video game developed and published by Sega for the Nintendo Switch, Xbox One, PlayStation 4, and in 2019 for Microsoft Windows (through the Steam platform).

Released in Japan under the name Puyo Puyo eSports, the game was localized for international release in 2019 under the name Puyo Puyo Champions. As with Puyo Puyo Tetris, the international release features English characters voices, allowing the player to change between the original Japanese and the English localized voices; the game interface is also available in French, German, Italian, Spanish, Traditional Chinese, Simplified Chinese and Korean.

== Gameplay ==
The game features two gameplay rulesets from the earlier games:

- Puyo Puyo 2
- Puyo Pop Fever

The game modes available include:

- Multiplayer, the main focus of the game; it can be played locally on the same device or via LAN, or with other players online, casually or competitively.
- Tournament, a local multiplayer mode for up to eight players, featuring a single-elimination tournament.
- Lessons, a single-player mode for learning the basics of the game and training.
- Challenges, the only other single-player mode available, mainly to test players' skills and abilities.

In both Multiplayer and Tournament modes, players are eliminated if they top out, and the last player (or side) standing wins the round.

As per its Japanese title, this game is aimed at eSports and thus focuses on competitive multiplayer, lacking the single-player campaign mode prominently featured in most other Puyo Puyo games.

Puyo Puyo Champions features 24 playable characters, complete with their own distinct AI behavior and Fever drop pattern, though some of these characters simply reuse the existing AI of characters not appearing in the game as playable. These characters include fan-favorites from the original Compile game series such as Arle Nadja and Dark Prince, as well as newer characters such as Ally, who debuted in the Japan-only Nintendo 3DS game Puyo Puyo Chronicle, even a handful of characters from Puyopuyo!! Quest. The 2.02 update, released in August 2020, added two hidden characters, Rafisol and Paprisu, each of whom can be selected by inputting a specific button combination while selecting character.

The game also allows players to personalize their in-game profile image, with over a hundred characters to choose from both the main game series and Puyopuyo!! Quest, as well as a selection of backgrounds and borders, all of which seem to be carried over from Puyopuyo!! Quest.

== Reception ==
Reception

Aggregate score
Aggregator	Score
Metacritic	74

Review scores
Publication	Score
Nintendo Life	80
Nintendo World Report	70
Pocket Gamer	70
CGMAGAZINE	80
Multiplayer.it	75
Gameblog.fr	70
Hobby Consolas	76
InsiderGamer.nl	78

The game received mostly favorable reviews. The Nintendo Switch version received a score of 74/100 at Metacritic, based on 10 reviews, while the PlayStation 4 one received a score of 74/100, based on 4 reviews.

Nintendo Life says that Puyo Puyo Champions ably covers the essentials of the series at a great price point, leaving a score of 80/100.
