= Kenichi Ono =

Japanese actor

- 小野 健一
- Born: Kikuo Ono; January 11, 1958 (age 68); Tokyo, Japan
- Occupations: Actor, tarento, voice actor
- Years active: 1983–present
- Agent: Rush Style
- Height: 180 cm (5 ft 11 in)

Kenichi Ono (小野 健一, Ono Ken'ichi; born January 11, 1958) is a Japanese voice actor, tarento, and actor from Tokyo. His birth name is Kikuo Ono (小野 喜久男, Ono Kikuo). He is best known for voicing as the villain character, Yoichi Takato, from Kindaichi Case Files series.

== Filmography ==
=== Anime television series ===
- Zillion (1987) (Dr. Kariga)
- Topo Gigio (1988) (Pierre)
- Shurato (1989) (Antena)
- Idol Angel Yokoso Yoko (1990) (Zen)
- Future GPX Cyber Formula (1991) (Asurada)
- Tonde Burin (1994) (Shinichiro Kokubu)
- Saint Tail (1995) (Kawai)
- Mama Loves the Poyopoyo-Saurus (1995) (Gendai's Father)
- Martian Successor Nadesico (1996) (Prospector)
- B'TX (1996) (B'T Falcon)
- Inuyasha (2000) (Newscaster)
- Hikaru no Go (2001) (Kawaii-san)
- Futari wa Pretty Cure (2004) (Evil King, Shiklp)
- Futari wa Pretty Cure Max Heart (2005) (Evil King, Baldez)
- Eureka Seven (2005) (Morita)
- RockMan.EXE (2005) (Dark Miyabi)
- Keroro Gunsō (2008) (Alien Kanryō)
- Yashahime: Princess Half-Demon (2021) (Nanahoshi)

Unknown date

- Kaiketsu Zorori (Yocchan)
- Kindaichi Case Files (Takato Youichi, Watson)
- Kinnikuman: Nisei (Ramenman)
- Cinderella Boy (Romer)
- Beyblade (George Smith)
- Attacker You! (Machio Tsuruoka)
- Hajime no Ippo (Fujii)
- Bobobo-bo Bo-bobo (Nenchaku)
- Super Robot Wars Original Generation: Divine Wars (Sanger Zonvolt)
- Machine Robo: Revenge of Cronos (Gillhead, Devil Satan 6)
- Machine Robo: Battle Hackers (Shuttle Robo, Shibumidas, Devil Satan 6)
- Muka Muka Paradise (Bundoi)
- Romeo's Blue Skies (Leon)
- Love Hina (Naru's stepfather)
- Flame of Recca (Fumio Tatesako (Tatesako-sensei))
- One Piece (Gin, Dalton, Mr. 11, San Juan Wolf)
- Powerpuff Girls Z (Radio Wave Monster)
- Dai-Guard (Shirou Shirota)
- Kaito Joker (Dark Eye)

=== OVA ===
- Cosmo Police Justy (1985) (Bolbar)
- Guyver (1989) (Aptom)
- Future GPX Cyber Formula (1991) (Asurada)
- Legend of the Galactic Heroes (1991) (Sound Soulszzcuaritter)
- Mōryō Senki Madara (1991) (Koubaku)
- Mega Man: Upon a Star (1993) (Yuta's Father)
- The Rapeman (1994) (Tatsuo)
- Special Duty Combat Unit Shinesman (1996) (Shinesman Sepia)
- Gekigangar III (1998) (Umitsubame Joe)
- Super Robot Wars Original Generation: The Animation (2005) (Sanger Zonvolt)
- Stratos 4 (2006) (Jun Mikuriya)

=== Anime films ===
- Noiseman Sound Insect (1997) (Prospector)
- Martian Successor Nadesico: The Prince of Darkness (1998) (Prospector)
- Kindaichi Case Files 2 (xxxx) (Takato Youichi)
- Trigun: Badlands Rumble (2010)

=== Games ===
- Super Adventure Rockman (1998) (Gutsman, Flashman)
- Zettai Zetsumei Toshi (2002) (Takashi Tsuzugi, Yoshitaka Shinzaki)
- From TV Animation - One Piece: Grand Battle! 2 (2002) (Dalton)
- Project X Zone (2012) (Sanger Zonvolt)
- Kinnikuman Series (xxxx-xx) (Ramenman/Mongolman, Specialman)
- Super Robot Wars Series (xxxx-xx) (Sanger Zonvolt, Prospector, Devil Satan 6, Wodan Ymir)
- Super Robot Wars MX (2004) (Devil Satan 6)
- Super Robot Wars Z (2008)
- Puyo Puyo~n (1999) (Satan)
- Puyo Puyo 7 (2009) (Risukuma-senpai, Skeleton-T)
- Puyo Puyo!! 20th Anniversary (2011) (Risukuma-senpai)
- Puyo Puyo Tetris (2014) (Risukuma-senpai)

=== Drama CDs ===
- Analyst no Yuutsu series 1: Benchmark ni Koi wo Shite (xxxx) (Shinjirou Tsujitani)
- Fushigi Yūgi Genbu Kaiden (xxxx) (Soruen)
- Last Order (xxxx) (Kazuhiro Shiho)
- Pearl series 2: Yokubari na Pearl (xxxx) (Shuuichi Kawamura)
- Pearl series 3: Wagamama na Pearl (xxxx) (Shuuichi Kawamura)
- Pearl series 4: Kimagure na Pearl (xxxx) (Shuuichi Kawamura)
- Shinshitsu No Kagi Kaimasu (xxxx) (Pastor)
- Tokyo Deep Night (xxxx) (Kitou)
- Yumemiru Nemuri Otoko (xxxx) (Okagami)

=== Dub work ===
==== Live-action ====
- 1987: When the Day Comes (Han Byung-yong (Yoo Hae-jin))
- All of Us Are Dead (Nam So-ju (Jeon Bae-soo))
- Apollo 13 (Henry Hurt (Xander Berkeley))
- Coherence (Mike (Nicholas Brendon))
- Confidential Assignment (Kang Jin-tae (Yoo Hae-jin))
- Die Hard with a Vengeance (1999 TV Asahi edition) (Rolf (Robert Sedgwick))
- Deep Rising (Mulligan)
- Dawn of the Dead (Steve (Ty Burrell))
- The Fast and the Furious (Muse)
- The Goonies (Troy Perkins (Steve Antin))
- L.A. Law (Jonathan Rollins)
- Last Light (2009 DVD edition) (Lt. Lionel McMannis (Clancy Brown))
- Mad About You (Paul Buchman (Paul Reiser))
- On the Edge (Mikey (Paul Hickey))
- Scrooged (James Cross (John Murray))

==== Animation ====
- Dorothy and the Wizard of Oz (Cowardly Lion)
