= Puyo Puyo Tetris 2 =

2020 video game

- Developer: Sega
- Publisher: Sega
- Director: Naohiro Hirao
- Producer: Mizuki Hosoyamada
- Programmer: Naoko Shimura
- Artist: Akira Mikame
- Composer: Hideki Abe
- Series: Puyo Puyo; Tetris
- Platforms: Nintendo Switch; PlayStation 4; PlayStation 5; Xbox One; Xbox Series X/S; Windows; Nintendo Switch 2
- Release: NS, PS4, PS5, Xbox One, Xbox Series X/S; WW: December 8, 2020; JP/AS: December 10, 2020; Windows; WW: March 23, 2021; Switch 2; WW: June 5, 2025
- Genre: Puzzle
- Modes: Single-player, multiplayer

Puyo Puyo Tetris 2 (Note: Japanese: ぷよぷよテトリス2, Hepburn: Puyopuyo Tetorisu 2) is a puzzle video game developed and published by Sega. It is an installment in the Puyo Puyo series and a direct sequel to Puyo Puyo Tetris. The game was released for Nintendo Switch, PlayStation 4, PlayStation 5, Xbox One, and Xbox Series X/S on December 8, 2020 with a Windows version released on March 23, 2021. A version for Nintendo Switch 2, titled Puyo Puyo Tetris 2S, released on June 5, 2025. The game was released to generally positive reviews.

This game is notable for being the first Puyo Puyo game that allowed players outside of Japan to compete in Sega's esport events.

== Gameplay ==
Gameplay

Like the previous game, Puyo Puyo Tetris 2 revolves around the two different gameplay styles of the Puyo Puyo and Tetris series respectively. Players can choose between Puyo style, which involves arranging colored blobs (puyos) and matching them together to set off combo chains, and Tetris style, which involves placing shaped blocks (tetriminos) to create lines and removing them from the grid. Players compete against each other with the style of their choosing, with the aim of sending garbage to their opponents, causing their play field to overflow and eliminating them. The game features all the modes featured in the original Puyo Puyo Tetris, including the Swap and Fusion modes which feature both styles.

In addition to a new story and characters, the game introduces new modes, such as Skill battles which allow for character based skills and items to quickly change the game. The game has an improved online mode from the first game, allowing for more competition in leagues and free play, as well as new modes. In Adventure mode, the players traverse an overworld and engage in Skill Battles with other characters in the story, that acts more like a JRPG.

== Story ==
After the events of the first game, the worlds of Puyo and Tetris are separated once more, leading to all of the characters forgetting the memories they gained from their previous adventure. Strangely, the two puzzle worlds merge once more, seemingly caused by a brand new character, Marle. Ringo first encounters Tee and his crew in Suzuran, who are encouraged to pursue the mysterious force by the Keeper of Dimensions, Ex.

After Ringo gathers Amitie, Arle Nadja, and Carbuncle the characters are introduced to the S.S Tetra's crew, and they pursue Marle. Eventually, they learn that she had brainwashed many of the citizens of Primp Town into constantly desiring to battle. Through the act of battling, Tee's crew and Ringo's friends free the citizens from Marle's spell and eventually find and defeat her.

Marle reveals that she herself had been under the control of another new character, Squares. The cast of characters travel aboard the S.S Tetra to ask for Ex's guidance, who creates a path of various riddles to help Marle recall the circumstances surrounding the merging of worlds and Squares. After regaining her memories, Marle explains that she is the human incarnation of the Will of the Worlds, and that Squares was created by her to focus on maintaining the order of the world.

The group of friends travel to the edge of the two worlds and face off against Squares, who wishes to destroy both worlds entirely due to their merging disrupting the natural order. As they battle Squares, Marle comes to the realization that Squares has the mentality of an infant despite his older appearance and voice. Marle calms Squares, and the group help quell the power he had progressively gained over the course of the adventure. After saying their sentimental goodbyes, the worlds separate once more.

== Development and release ==
Puyo Puyo Tetris 2 was showcased during a Nintendo Direct Mini presentation in August 2020, and was released in December for Nintendo Switch. The game was also released in the same month for PlayStation 4, Xbox One, Xbox Series X/S and PlayStation 5. A Windows version on Steam was released on March 23, 2021. It is also set to be released for the Nintendo Switch 2 as Puyo Puyo Tetris 2S on June 5, 2025. This version includes an additional game mode, "Puyo Tetris Doubles", and support for the system's mouse functionality.

Three updates were released in 2021: the first update for January added four additional playable characters including Sonic the Hedgehog from the series of the same name. In a second update, released in February, four new characters were added from Puyo Puyo 2, the Puyo Pop Fever games, and Puyo Puyo Chronicle. Accessibility options for color blind players were added, alongside three new songs and multiplayer support for certain modes previously only playable in single-player. New challenge rules were also added. In March, the final update was released, adding four characters from the Puyo Puyo series, the ability for PlayStation 4 and PlayStation 5 players to participate in online play together, four additional songs, a spectator mode (allowing players to watch online matches), and a harder "Super Spicy" difficulty setting, in addition to also adding twenty new user avatar pictures.

A re-release of the game available exclusively on Nintendo Switch 2, Puyo Puyo Tetris 2S, adds a new game mode called "Puyo Tetris Doubles" and Joy-Con 2 "mouse" controls.

== Esports ==
In September 2024, Sega initiated the Puyo Puyo GLOBAL RANKING SERIES, a series of tournaments with the aim of expanding competitive Puyo Puyo outside of Japan. The winner of the series would receive a paid trip to Japan to participate in the Puyo Puyo Grand Prix Final, which is a Puyo Puyo esport tournament licensed by Sega, as well as a cash prize and a uniform. This is the first set of events where players outside of Japan could compete in Sega's esport tournaments.

== Reception ==
Reception

Aggregate scores
Aggregator	Score
Metacritic	NS: 80/100; PS4: 80/100; PS5: 76/100; XBXS: 80/100
OpenCritic	78% recommend

Review scores
Publication	Score
GameSpot	7/10
GamesRadar+	3.5/5
Nintendo Life	8/10
Nintendo World Report	9/10
Retro Gamer	80%

Nintendo Life gave the Nintendo Switch version 8/10 and praised the Adventure mode, stating that it was "just as entertaining as the last one", as well as describing Skill Battle as "an interesting way to try and add more depth and strategy to Tetris and Puyo Puyo battling", but criticized the lack of new features compared to the predecessor.

The game received "generally favorable reviews" according to review aggregator website Metacritic. Fellow review aggregator OpenCritic assessed that the game received strong approval, being recommended by 78% of critics.

Nick Thorpe of Retro Gamer found that very little had changed from the first Puyo Puyo Tetris. Thorpe found the addition of the new Skill Battle mode "works well enough" while stating that the addition of a health bar meant that a player could be defeated without "topping out" which "feels a bit wrong." He recommended the game to general players but cautioned that if you had already owned the first game, it was only worth upgrading if they were fanatical about the game or online play.
