= Puyo Puyo Chronicle =

2016 video game

- Developer: Sega
- Publisher: Sega
- Director: Naohiro Hirao
- Producer: Tetsu Katano
- Designer: Hiroki Kakishita
- Artist: Hiroshi Kanazawa
- Composers: Teruhiko Nakagawa; Tadashi Kinukawa
- Series: Puyo Puyo
- Platform: Nintendo 3DS
- Release: JP: December 8, 2016
- Genres: Puzzle, role-playing
- Modes: Single-player, multiplayer

Puyo Puyo Chronicle (ぷよぷよクロニクル, Puyopuyo Kuronikuru) is a 2016 puzzle video game developed and published by Sega for the Nintendo 3DS. It was released in Japan on December 8, 2016, to celebrate the 25th anniversary of the Puyo Puyo series.

In addition to the standard Puyo Puyo gameplay, this game introduces role-playing elements, allowing to have up to three allies in the player's team, as well as over 60 side missions and introduces a new protagonist, Ally. The single player story takes place in an RPG, where the protagonist Arle Nadja gets sucked into the Book World and has to free five stars trapped inside mysterious balls across the land.

Puyo Puyo Chronicle received mixed reviews. While the multiplayer content was praised, the game was criticized for its tedious and repetitive single player mode, as well recycling gameplay modes and other assets from previous titles. The game failed commercially, and is the last dedicated Puyo Puyo anniversary game to date, with subsequent anniversaries being celebrated via updates to existing games in the series. In a Japanese survey, Puyo Puyo Chronicle was ranked among the least favorite games in the series.

== Gameplay ==
Puyo Puyo Chronicle game has 18 modes of gameplay, with 16 of them from Puyo Puyo!! 20th Anniversary and one from Puyo Puyo Tetris. Except in Mission mode, a player is eliminated when they top out, and the last player (or team) standing wins the round.

=== Skill Battle ===
Skill Battle is a mode based on the games single-player campaign. The goal of this mode is to knock out the opponent by draining their health bar, where filling up the third column causes them to lose a large amount of HP (instead of losing the battle). Each player assembles a group of three characters, where each character has different skills that can change the outcome of the match.

== Reception and sales ==
Reception

Review scores
| Publication | Score |
|---|---|
| Famitsu | 32/40 |
| SEGAbits | B− |

Puyo Puyo Chronicle received mixed reviews.

Reviewers praised the game's 3D artstyle, noting that the shift to models allowed characters to be more flexible in animation and movement. The selection of game modes divided critics; while one reviewer from Famitsu stated that the game offers a wide variety of rules, SEGAbits noted that most of these rules were recycled from past titles.

The RPG story mode received heavy criticism. Reviewers felt that while the mode make it easy for beginners to play, it lacked quality and that the battles were redundant, repetitive, and tedious. In addition, SEGAbits opined that while the RPG mode was ambitious, experienced players could ignore the added mechanics by hitting enemies with a large enough chain.

Puyo Puyo Chronicle is considered a commercial failure. The game sold 13,873 copies in the first week in Japan, increasing to a lifetime total of 21,451 copies, and series producer Mizuki Hosoyamada stated that the game sold poorly in a 2021 interview.

== Legacy ==
Puyo Puyo Chronicle was the last mainline game released to celebrate the series anniversary. The next Puyo Puyo anniversary was celebrated via Super Puyo Quest Project, a large update to Puyopuyo!! Quest that changed major parts of the game, such as adding main characters and a main storyline.

In a 2021 netlab survey asking players for their favorite Puyo Puyo game, Puyo Puyo Chronicle was ranked as the second least favorite game out of the 14 main choices. At rank 13, it was ahead of Puyo Pop and below Puyo Puyo Champions, an esports game.
