= Madō Monogatari I =

1996 video game

- Official cover art (Mega Drive version)
- Developer: Compile
- Publisher: Compile
- Designer: Hitoshi Nishizaka
- Composer: Masanobu Tsukamoto
- Series: Madō Monogatari
- Platforms: Mega Drive, PC Engine, Game Gear
- Release: JP: March 22, 1996
- Genre: Role-playing video game w/ first-person perspective
- Mode: Single-player

Madō Monogatari I (Note: Madō Monogatari I (魔導物語Ｉ; lit. Story of Sorcery I)) is a 1996 role-playing video game developed and published by Compile for the Mega Drive. It is the last official Mega Drive game released in Japan. The game is part of the long-running Madō Monogatari series.

It is a later revision to the Game Gear version, Madō Monogatari I: Mittsu no Madō-kyū, (Note: Madō Monogatari I: Mittsu no Madō-kyū (魔導物語I 3つの魔導球; lit. Story of Sorcery I: Three Magical Spheres)) which is based on the original MSX and PC98 versions, and borrows heavily from the PC Engine version, Madō Monogatari I: Honō no Sotsuenji. (Note: Madō Monogatari I: Honō no Sotsuenji (魔導物語I 炎の卒園児; lit. Story of Sorcery I: Flame Graduate))

== Gameplay ==
The game takes place in a 3D maze with obstacles, enemies, and characters to confront. Attacking monsters is similar to Paladin's Quest and the Phantasy Star series. A few examples of crazy items are Japanese curry, champagne, mini-elephant, and strange little crystals that may summon Santa. There is also a capsule item that allows players to capture enemies in a similar way to the Pokémon video games. Once captured, these enemies will serve as allies to the main player. Both brains and brawn must be used as the battles and puzzles are equally difficult in the lower levels of the game.

== Plot ==
Five-year-old Arle Nadja (later the protagonist in the Puyo Puyo series) is a member of the magic school. For her final exam, she must go through the Dark Prince's tower. Her knowledge and skills will be greatly tested with the puzzles and illusions of fiends that are inside. Not all are illusions though, there may be rivals and friends in this tower and Arle has to be on the lookout if she wants to pass this test.
