= Puyo Puyo Da! =

1999 video game

- Dreamcast cover art
- Developer: Compile
- Publisher: Sega
- Series: Puyo Puyo
- Platforms: Dreamcast, Arcade
- Release: Dreamcast: JP: December 16, 1999; Arcade: JP: December 26, 1999
- Genre: Dancing
- Modes: Single-player, multiplayer
- Arcade system: Sega Naomi

Puyo Puyo Da! featuring Ellena System (ぷよぷよDA! –featuring ELLENA System–) is a Puyo Puyo dancing game created in 1999 for Arcade and Dreamcast. The game was released only in Japan. It is an adaptation of one of developer Compile's Disc Station games, Broadway Legend Ellena.

== Objective ==
Arle Nadja and her friends take some time off from Puyo fighting and challenge players to dance with them. The game features several dance stages, similar to games such as Space Channel 5 and PaRappa the Rapper. It also introduces a new ELLENA system used to render the game as well as a new exclusive character featuring the same name (Ellena Stevens, the protagonist of the original Broadway Legend Ellena featuring Park Jin-young). One or two players can dance to a variety of J-pop tunes by using the controller buttons to copy their opponent's moves. Based on how well a player copies the moves, Nuisance Puyos are sent to their opponent. The player loses if their health bar drops to 0, or if they have Nuisance Puyos on their side of the screen.

== Reception ==
Unlike other Puyo Puyo games, this one met with mainly negative reviews. GameSpot gave a 2.3 'terrible' rating stating that "you can pick up Puyo Puyo DA! and be completely fed up with it within an hour".
