= Puyo Puyo!! 20th Anniversary =

2011 video game

- Nintendo DS cover art
- Developer: Sonic Team
- Publisher: Sega
- Director: Takumi Yoshinaga
- Producer: Mizuki Hosoyamada
- Designers: Utako Yoshino; Takeshi Yamazaki
- Programmer: Takuma Komatsu
- Artist: Akira Mikame
- Composer: Hideki Abe
- Series: Puyo Puyo
- Platforms: Nintendo DS, Nintendo 3DS, Wii, PlayStation Portable
- Release: Nintendo DS: JP: July 14, 2011; Nintendo 3DS, Wii, PlayStation Portable: JP: December 15, 2011
- Genre: Puzzle
- Modes: Single-player, multiplayer

Puyo Puyo!! 20th Anniversary is a puzzle video game developed by Sonic Team and published by Sega. The game honored the twentieth year of the Puyo Puyo series, and was first released for the Nintendo DS in July 2011, and later for Wii, Nintendo 3DS, and PlayStation Portable in December.

== Gameplay ==
The gameplay follows the traditional mechanics of the series: players connect falling pieces ("Puyo") of the same color in groups of four or more to trigger chain reactions and send Nuisance Puyo to their opponent's field. In total, the game has 20 gameplay modes, including five unlockable modes from Puyo Puyo! 15th Anniversary and 15 modes available from the start: classic rules from Puyo Puyo, Puyo Puyo Tsu, Puyo Puyo Fever, and Nazo Puyo; returning modes Puyo Puyo SUN, Mini Puyo Fever, and Mega Puyo Rush; and eight new modes (Active, Blocks, Cross Spinner, Gust, Quartet, Slot, Foursight, and Mini Puyo Excavation).

The story mode features 24 playable characters from previous entries (spanning the original Puyo Puyo to Puyo Puyo 7), each with their own eight-stage scenario and comedic cutscenes. A tutorial "School" mode offers lessons on building chains for beginners as well as challenge missions and high-difficulty AI matches for experienced players. Except in Mission and Pair Puyo modes, a player is eliminated when they top out, and the last player (or side) standing wins the round.

=== "Pair Puyo" ===
"Pair Puyo" is a two-on-two cooperative team mode playable with human or AI partners. Teammates share Nuisance Puyo and a pool of lives; when a player's field tops out, the board is cleared at the cost of a life so play can continue. When all lives are lost, the team is eliminated, and the last team standing wins the match.

Players earn bonuses for "Extra Chains" (initiating a chain while a teammate's chain is active) and "Synchro Chains" (simultaneously triggering chains of three or more of the same length).

=== Shop ===
As in Puyo Puyo Fever 2, the game includes a shop, though instead of gameplay items, players spend points earned in various modes on Puyo skins, alternate character voices, and costumes. Purchasing advice in the shop also unlocks the five hidden modes from Puyo Puyo! 15th Anniversary.

== Development and release ==
According to producer Mizuki Hosoyamada, the developers wanted the series' twentieth anniversary entry to have a festive atmosphere and bring together players of different generations, such as parents and children. New rules like Slot were designed so beginners could defeat experienced players by switching modes, while Puyo Puyo SUN returned due to strong fan demand.

The December 2011 ports added platform-specific features. The Nintendo 3DS version supports stereoscopic 3D and the built-in camera, allowing players to use photos to customize the playing field and Puyo pieces. The DS version supports local multiplayer for up to eight players, single-card Download Play for up to four players, and online matches over Wi-Fi; the 3DS and Wii versions also include online play. The Wii version features a 16:9 widescreen display and cooperative modes using Wii Remote controllers, while the PlayStation Portable version includes two-player matches on a single system as well as Ad Hoc and Game Sharing support for up to four players. Special editions, including an anniversary box and pouch set for the DS and a limited edition with 41 character pins for the 3DS, were also sold in Japan alongside a pre-order remix soundtrack CD for the December releases.

== Reception ==
Previewing the Nintendo 3DS version at the Tokyo Game Show in September 2011, Allistair Pinsof of Destructoid praised the faster gameplay, variety of modes, and user interface improvements, such as a dotted drop indicator and the highlighting of matching pieces below the held Puyo (which he noted aids color-blind players), though he criticized the 3D effect and the shrunken playing field. In a 2017 retrospective for Hardcore Gaming 101, Will M. considered the game a more fulfilling experience than Puyo Puyo! 15th Anniversary, citing the distinct story scenarios for each character, the ability to choose rules before rounds rather than relying solely on a roulette, the "Pair Puyo" mode, and the challenging tutorial missions.
