= Kirby's Avalanche =

1995 video game

- North American cover art
- Developers: Compile; HAL Laboratory
- Publisher: Nintendo
- Director: Kazunori Ikeda
- Producer: Masamitsu Niitani
- Programmer: Takayuki Hirono
- Artist: Koji Teramoto
- Composer: Akiyoshi Nagao
- Series: Kirby; Puyo Puyo
- Platform: Super NES
- Release: NA/EU: February 1995
- Genre: Puzzle
- Modes: Single-player, multiplayer

Kirby's Avalanche, known in Europe as Kirby's Ghost Trap, is a puzzle video game developed by Compile and HAL Laboratory and published by Nintendo for the Super Nintendo Entertainment System. It was released in North America and Europe in February 1995. It is a Western release of the Japanese Super Puyo Puyo featuring characters from the Kirby series. There was not a Japanese release, and the game remains the only Kirby title not released there. In Europe and Australia, the game was re-released on the Wii's Virtual Console service on July 27, 2007, and in North America on September 24, 2007. The game was re-released for the Nintendo Classics service on July 21, 2022.

== Gameplay ==
Kirby's Avalanche pits players against either computer-controlled or player-controlled opponents.

The gameplay is the same as in Super Puyo Puyo, with groups of two colored blobs fall from the top of the screen. The player must rotate and move the groups before they touch the bottom of the screen or the pile, so that matching-colored blobs touch from above, below, the left or the right. Once four or more same-colored blobs touch, they will disappear, and any blobs above them will fall down to fill in space. If a player manages to set off a chain reaction with these blobs, rocks will fall on the other player's screen, filling it up and giving them less room to drop additional blobs. The number of rocks that falls depends on both the number of blobs popped and the number of consecutive chain reactions. These rocks will only disappear if a player manages to pop a group of blobs that are in direct contact with the rocks. A player will lose if either of the middle columns in the top row is filled with a blob or rock.

== Plot ==
King Dedede has challenged Kirby and other members of Dream Land to an Avalanche Competition at the Fountain of Dreams. Kirby decides to take on the challenge, battling his way through the forest in Avalanche matches against an assortment of his old foes from Kirby's Dream Land and Kirby's Adventure (including recurring bosses such as Whispy Woods, Kracko and Meta Knight), and ultimately to a final showdown at the Fountain of Dreams with King Dedede to win the Cup.

== Version differences ==
While the core gameplay remains the same, the Japanese and Western versions are drastically different cosmetically. As the story in Super Puyo Puyo is more focused on Arle Nadja and Carbuncle's adventures like the Madou Monogatari and Mega Drive Puyo Puyo versions, the Western version replaced them with Kirby characters to appeal to Western audiences.

As a game released later in the SNES's life cycle, this game has bright colors and advanced graphics for its time. The sound consists of remixed tracks from Kirby's Adventure and Kirby's Dream Course, with only one original track from the Puyo Puyo game itself (the panic music). The game also includes several voice samples.

Both versions have cinematics between each round, with differences being Kirby and his opponents shown having full conversations and trash-talking each other in full sentences in the Western version, and that Kirby's personality comes off as a lot more sarcastic and confrontational, just as Arle and Carbuncle were in the Japanese version. This differs greatly from other Kirby games, where Kirby hardly speaks at all and is also friendlier in general.

== Reception ==
Reception

Aggregate score
Aggregator	Score
GameRankings	74%

Review scores
Publication	Score
AllGame	3.5/5
Computer and Video Games	3/5
GameSpot	6.5/10
Hyper	80/100
IGN	7.5/10
Mega Fun	73%
Next Generation	4/5
Nintendo Life	6/10
Nintendo Power	3.425/5
Official Nintendo Magazine	90/100
Total!	91/100
Video Games (DE)	75%
VideoGames & Computer Entertainment	8/10

Kirby's Avalanche received generally positive reviews, garnering an aggregate score of 74% on GameRankings based on seven reviews. IGN awarded the game 7.5 out of 10, comparing it favorably to Dr. Robotnik's Mean Bean Machine, another Puyo Puyo reskin released for the Sega Genesis in North America. GamePro commented that "Although Kirby's Avalanche is a rehash of an overdone puzzler theme, it's so well done that it's worth playing—that is, if you don't already have three puzzle games just like it." They particularly praised the graphics and the cuteness of the digitized speech.

Next Generation stated that "While we've seen this kind of game before, and this version doesn't offer any improvements it's still excellent fun."

In 1997 Electronic Gaming Monthly ranked Kirby's Avalanche and Mean Bean Machine collectively as number 84 on their "100 Best Games of All Time", calling it "one of the simplest, most addicting puzzle games around." IGN rated the game 68th on its "Top 100 SNES of All Time." In 1995, Total! listed the game 9th on their Top 100 SNES Games.
