= Puyo Puyo~n =

1999 video game

- Dreamcast cover art
- Developer: Compile
- Publishers: Sega (Dreamcast, PSN); Compile (other releases)
- Series: Puyo Puyo
- Platforms: Dreamcast, Nintendo 64, PlayStation, Game Boy Color
- Release: Dreamcast: JP: March 4, 1999; Nintendo 64: JP: December 3, 1999; PlayStation: JP: December 16, 1999; Game Boy Color: JP: September 22, 2000
- Genre: Puzzle
- Modes: Single-player, multiplayer

Puyo Puyo~n (ぷよぷよ〜ん, Puyopuyōn), also known as Puyo Puyo 4 and Puyo Puyo~n Party (for the N64 version), is a 1999 puzzle video game and the fourth installment of the Puyo Puyo series, created by Compile for the Dreamcast, PlayStation, Nintendo 64 and Game Boy Color. Like many of the Puyo Puyo games, it was never officially released outside Japan. The title of Puyo Puyo~n comes from the Japanese word yon (四; meaning four), signifying the fourth game in the series.

== Gameplay ==
The gameplay of ~n remains similar to Puyo Puyo 2, with a new addition of character specials. As Puyo are erased from the field, a power gauge fills up, enabling the use of a special ability. Each character's ability differs, and vary between the home console versions and the Game Boy Color version. Each grid in the home console versions follows Special Rule, where a preset field and special board rules are implemented. In the Game Boy Color version, whenever garbage is countered, Sun Puyo fall on the field. The game also features several Endless modes involving grids larger or smaller than 6x12, and a Free Battle mode allowing for matches against any unlocked characters. The game has graphic design by artist Sunaho Tobe.

There were subtle differences between the home console versions of ~n, but the Game Boy Color version is vastly different. Puyo Puyo~n: Kaa-kun to Issho (lit. "Puyo Puyo~n: Together with Carby") for the PlayStation has the same music as the Dreamcast version of Puyo Puyo~n, but only supports up to two players. Puyo Puyo~n Party 64 for the Nintendo 64 has different music from the Dreamcast version and lacks the voiced cutscenes, but retains four player multiplayer. This version also includes Transfer Pak support, with players able to view artwork unlocked in Pocket Puyo Puyo SUN, some of which can only be unlocked by linking the two games. Pocket Puyo Puyo~n for the Game Boy Color uses music from Pocket Puyo Puyo Sun as well as music from Puyo~n itself, and features more characters, including some of the cast from Pocket Puyo Puyo Sun. It supports two players and follows the story of ~n, retaining the comic humor of previous handheld versions. Pocket Puyo Puyo~n also has a special Rally mode to unlock the specials, and allows the player to choose their special before the game starts. Pocket Puyo Puyo~n does not have Special Rule or any board-specific functions like the home console versions, nor does it have any of the different grid sizes for Endless Puyo Puyo, but it does feature the ability to play Endless similarly to Puyo Puyo 2's Action Endless (where garbage appears in the tray, and helpers appear at random times depending on the difficulty setting).

== Plot ==
The Dark Prince is found looking at some books in a magical library when he comes across a black box. He begins to examine the black box before it breaks free from his hands and opens. The next morning a Puyo Circus arrives, which Arle Nadja and Carbuncle go to check out. They are greeted by Pierrot, a mysterious jester-looking character.

When Arle arrives, something does not appear right, and Carbuncle disappears once more. Arle has to navigate her way past a number of foes as before. During her quest Draco, Serilly, Witch and Chico join up with Arle as they face Schezo and Rulue. Rulue knew something was up with the Dark Prince, and when Arle meets him, he appears strange and unlike his normal self. He freezes the other characters so that they do not interfere. Arle defeats the Dark Prince, who wakes up and asks why Arle is there. He further explains to Arle that he was brainwashed by a stronger foe, and Pierrot appears afterwards, revealing herself to be Doppelganger Arle. She and Arle fight to see who should exist, and Arle is victorious.

After the fight, Doppelganger Arle insists that she is "The Real Arle" who existed in the previous world. Weakened by her defeat, she soon fades away, much to Arle's shock. Seconds later, Carbuncle reappears in the room and Arle is thrilled to see him again. The gem on Carbuncle's forehead shines, and as Arle asks what was wrong, he discharges the beam from his forehead. The screen fades to white, then black, and the credits roll.
