= Puyo Puyo =

Video game series

- Genre: Puzzle
- Developers: Compile (1991–2000); Sonic Team (2001–2013); Sega (2013–present); h.a.n.d. (2009-2011, 2024); O-Two (2011-2016)
- Publishers: Compile (1991–2000); Sega (1992–present)
- Creator: Kazunari Yonemitsu
- First release: Puyo Puyo; October 25, 1991
- Latest release: Puyo Puyo Puzzle Pop; April 4, 2024
- Parent series: Madō Monogatari

Puyo Puyo (ぷよぷよ), formerly known as Puyo Pop outside Japan, is a series of tile-matching video games created by Compile. Sega has owned the franchise since 1998, with games after 2001 being developed by Sonic Team. Puyo Puyo was created as a spin-off franchise to Madō Monogatari (Sorcery Saga), a series of first-person dungeon crawler role-playing games by Compile from which the Puyo Puyo characters originated. The series has sold over 10 million copies, including the Madō Monogatari games.

== Gameplay ==
Generally, the objective of Puyo Puyo games is to defeat the opponent by causing the third column from the left of their side of the screen to become filled with Puyo. Puyo are round, slime-like creatures that, in most variations of the game, fall from the top of the screen in groups of two, three, and four. The pieces can be moved, dropped, and rotated as they fall. The piece falls until it reaches another Puyo or the bottom of the screen. When four or more Puyo of the same color line up adjacent to each other, the Puyo will connect to each other, "Pop", and disappear. Puyo of the same color can connect horizontally or vertically, but not diagonally.

The Puyo above those that are cleared fall onto other pieces or the bottom of the screen. Simultaneous Pops (同時消し, simultaneous erasing) are created when more than one group is formed at a time.

A Chain occurs when falling Puyo trigger a new group of Puyo to Pop, setting off a chain reaction. Achieving a Chain results in Garbage Puyo, also known as Ojama Puyo (お邪魔ぷよ), being sent to either block the opponent's screen or counterbalance (offset, 相殺) the Garbage Puyo sent by the opponent. Garbage Puyo are translucent pieces that disappear when adjacent Puyo are popped. If multiple groups of Puyo are cleared consecutively due to a chain, the amount of Garbage Puyo increases based solely on the number of steps in the chain. Garbage Puyo are cached above the opponent's playing field, and do not fall until the attacker's chain concludes, and then the defender puts down a piece. Garbage Puyo block the opponents' playing fields, and can cause them to lose if one is placed the third spot from the left in the top row.

== Games ==
Release timeline
1991	Puyo Puyo
1992
1993	Nazo Puyo
1993	Nazo Puyo 2
1994	Nazo Puyo: Arle no Roux
1994	Puyo Puyo 2
1995	Super Nazo Puyo: Rulue no Roux
1996	Super Nazo Puyo 2: Rulue no Tetsuwan Hanjōki
1996	Puyo Puyo Sun
1997
1998	Wakuwaku Puyo Puyo Dungeon
1999	Puyo Puyo~n
1999	Puyo Puyo Gaiden: Puyo Wars
1999	Puyo Puyo Da!
2000	Arle no Bōken: Mahō no Jewel
2000	Puyo Puyo Box
2001	Minna de Puyo Puyo
2002
2003	Puyo Puyo Fever
2004	Puyo Puyo DX
2005	Puyo Puyo Fever 2
2006	Puyo Puyo! 15th Anniversary
2007
2008
2009	Puyo Puyo 7
2010
2011	Puyo Puyo!! 20th Anniversary
2012
2013	Puyopuyo!! Quest
2013	Puyopuyo!! Quest Arcade
2014	Puyo Puyo Tetris
2015
2016	Puyo Puyo Chronicle
2017
2018	Puyo Puyo Champions
2019
2020	Puyo Puyo Tetris 2
2021
2022
2023
2024	Puyo Puyo Puzzle Pop

=== Compile games ===
The first Puyo Puyo game was developed by Compile and released in 1991 for the MSX2 and Family Computer Disk System; the latter release was published by Tokuma Shoten as a pack-in for their Famimaga magazine. The puzzle game features characters from the 1990 role-playing video game Madō Monogatari 1-2-3, also developed by Compile. The game includes "Endless" mode, where the player attempts to amass a large score, "Mission" mode, where the player is given a pre-configured board and must attempt to satisfy conditions, and a two-player competitive mode.

Compile and Sega collaborated to create an arcade version of Puyo Puyo. It was released in October 1992 for Sega's System C2 hardware. Unlike the previous release, the game focuses on competitive play; the single-player mode consists of a gauntlet consisting of either 3, 10, or 13 computer opponents, while the multiplayer mode allows two human players to battle each other. The game was ported to several major platforms in Japan, with the Mega Drive becoming a bestseller.

The game was followed by Puyo Puyo 2 in September 1994, also released for Sega System C2. Puyo Puyo 2 adds the ability to counter the opponent's chains; additionally, it changes the single-player gauntlet from a linear structure to a roulette-based structure that requires the player to pass certain score thresholds to advance. Like its predecessor, Puyo Puyo 2 was released on a variety of home platforms. In 2004, it was included in the Sega Ages 2500 line of PlayStation 2 games.

Puyo Puyo Sun, released in 1996 for the Sega Titan Video arcade hardware, adds a "Sun Puyo" mechanic that allows the player to send extra garbage to opponents. Puyo Puyo~n, released in 1999 for the Dreamcast, adds character-specific powers that assist the player in clearing Puyo. Compile's final Puyo Puyo game, Puyo Puyo Box, includes ports of the first two arcade games alongside original content.

Compile released a variety of spin-off titles on home consoles, handhelds, and through their Disc Station disk magazine. The Nazo Puyo series expands on the original Puyo Puyo's Mission mode, with the Nazo Puyo: Arle no Roux for Game Gear in 1994, Super Nazo Puyo: Rulue no Roux for Super Famicom in 1995 and Super Nazo Puyo 2: Rulue no Tetsuwan Hanjōki for Super Famicom in 1996 introducing role-playing elements. Other notable spin-offs include the roguelike Wakuwaku Puyo Puyo Dungeon (1998, Sega Saturn and PlayStation), Puyo Puyo Da! dancing game (1998, arcade and Dreamcast), and Arle no Bōken: Mahō no Jewel monster-collecting role-playing game (2000, Game Boy Color).

=== Sonic Team-developed games ===
Sonic Team's first Puyo Puyo game was Minna de Puyo Puyo for the Game Boy Advance, released in Japan in 2001 and elsewhere in 2002 as Puyo Pop. It is one of three games named Puyo Pop.

Sega released Puyo Pop Fever in November 2003, for their NAOMI arcade hardware. The game features a mostly new set of characters, alongside new gameplay mechanics such as Fever Mode. Like its arcade predecessors, Fever was ported to many platforms; the Dreamcast version notably serves as Sega's final first party video game. A direct sequel, Puyo Puyo Fever 2 was released in 2005. Fever 2 added more characters and an expanded single-player mode. Puyo Puyo 7, released in 2009, adds a third protagonist and includes a new "Transformation" gameplay system.

In addition, games celebrating Puyo Puyo's 15th and 20th Anniversary were released. Puyo Puyo! 15th Anniversary (2006) includes more than ten gameplay rulesets, including the rules of the first Puyo Puyo, Puyo Puyo 2, and Puyo Puyo Fever, reintroduces characters that were absent from the series since Minna de Puyo Puyo, and gives every character in the game a single-player story. Puyo Puyo!! 20th Anniversary (2011) adds even more rulesets, such as Sun rules.

Puyo Puyo Tetris and Puyo Puyo Tetris 2, released in 2014 and 2020, include both Puyo Puyo and Tetris gameplay.

Puyo Puyo!! Quest is a free-to-play role-playing game released for iOS and Android in 2013. Sega has claimed that the game is a major success, and stated that the game has reached 11 million downloads and a monthly income of over 500 million yen (approx. US$4 million) as of February 2015.

Puyo Puyo was a mini-game in Hatsune Miku: Project Mirai Deluxe/DX in 2015. In game, this was called Puyo Puyo 39.

Puyo Puyo Chronicle was released in December 2016, in Japan for Nintendo 3DS, as part of the original Puyo Puyo game's 25th anniversary with no plans for localization, despite the demand for it. Unlike the other anniversary games, it features a role-playing game mode, although the classic rules are also included, and features a new character named Ally.

Puyo Puyo Champions (named Puyo Puyo eSports in Japan), a digital title with an emphasis on eSports tournament play, was released for PlayStation 4 and Nintendo Switch in October 2018, in Japan, and later for North America and Europe in May 2019.

=== International releases ===
The 1992 arcade Puyo Puyo was translated to English with character name changes and minor visual changes to Harpy, renamed Dark Elf, character's skit. Sega added this version into their Sega Ages port on Nintendo Switch. The Game Gear version of the 1992 arcade game, when played on non-Japanese Game Gears, plays a similar version titled Puzlow Kids, but the Game Gear version was never released outside Japan.

Instead of directly translating the Mega Drive version of the 1992 arcade game, Sega decided to replace the Madou Monogatari cast with villains from the Adventures of Sonic the Hedgehog animated television series. The resulting game, Dr. Robotnik's Mean Bean Machine, was released in 1993, along with a Game Gear version adapted from Nazo Puyo. Nintendo followed suit in 1995, modifying Super Puyo Puyo into Kirby's Avalanche (Kirby's Ghost Trap in Europe), featuring Kirby characters. Spectrum HoloByte also released a Puyo Puyo title for Microsoft Windows 3.1 and the Macintosh in August 1995, under the name Qwirks.

The next localized release was in 1999, when the Neo Geo Pocket Color port of Puyo Puyo 2 was released in English as Puyo Pop. Unlike the arcade translation, most characters kept their original names; only the character Satan retained his English arcade title of the Dark Prince. After the Game Boy Advance Puyo Pop, Puyo Pop Fever saw a worldwide release, with North America receiving the GameCube and Nintendo DS versions and Europe receiving it on the majority of platforms it came out on. A Mega Drive version of Puyo Puyo 2 was released, untranslated, on the Wii's Virtual Console as an import title and the arcade version of Puyo Puyo 2 is included in Sega 3D Classics Collection. Sonic Runners ran a collaboration event with Puyo Puyo!! Quest in July 2015.

Puyo Puyo Tetris was released overseas on the Nintendo Switch and the PlayStation 4 in 2017. This marks the first time a localized Puyo Puyo game was marketed overseas under its original name.

=== Other releases ===
The 1995 video game Timon & Pumbaa's Jungle Games, developed by 7th Level and published by Disney Interactive for Microsoft Windows and Mac OS, features a variation of Puyo Puyo titled Bug Drop, in which Puyos are replaced by bugs.

2003's Billy Hatcher and the Giant Egg features an unlockable Puyo Pop minigame, which requires the use of the GameCube – Game Boy Advance link cable to download the minigame to a Game Boy Advance.

In July 2005, Bandai released Kidou Gekidan Haro Ichiza: Haro no Puyo Puyo (機動劇団はろ一座 ハロのぷよぷよ) (lit. "Mobile Theatrical Company Haro: Haro's Puyo Puyo") in Japan for the GBA. It is based on the Mobile Suit Gundam anime series and presented in the style of the SD Gundam series. In this game, Puyo are replaced by Gundam's mascot, Haro.

A new mobile game, Puyo!! Touch, was released for iOS and Android devices in November 2015, but the service was shut down the following year on November 30, citing lackluster performance in the market.

A fan game, Puyo Puyo VS, was released for Microsoft Windows and focuses on multiplayer battles.

Sonic Mania (2017) contains a Puyo Puyo minigame as a boss battle in the Chemical Plant Zone and as an unlockable mode, directly referencing Dr. Robotnik's Mean Bean Machine. Director Christian Whitehead considered it the most "complex" boss fight for them to develop.

Puyo Puyo is playable via in-game arcade machines in Yakuza 6 and the PlayStation 4 version of Judgment.

An Apple Arcade exclusive title for iOS, macOS and tvOS, Puyo Puyo Puzzle Pop, was released in April 2024 and was developed by h.a.n.d..

== Development ==
Puyo Puyo was originally conceived by Compile employee and Sting Entertainment founder Kazunari Yonemitsu, who felt that the puzzle games at the time had "weak" characters and thus decided to create a puzzle game using characters from Compile's Madou Monogatari RPG series. The success of Street Fighter II influenced Puyo Puyo's focus on competitive gameplay, with Yonemitsu trying out many mechanics in an attempt to recapture the fighting game's competitive nature.

In March 1998, Sega obtained the rights to the Puyo Puyo series and its characters from Compile, while Compile continued to develop and publish Puyo Puyo games, even on platforms that Sega was competing against. These games include Sega in their copyright information. Prior to assuming full development duties for the franchise, Sega ported Puyo Puyo 2 to the WonderSwan.

== Esports ==
Puyo Puyo was approved as an esports game by the Japanese esports Union in March 2018. The first esports tournament for the game was held during Sega Fest 2018 from April 14 to April 15 of the same year.

In September 2024, Sega announced the Puyo Puyo GLOBAL RANKING SERIES, a series of Puyo only Puyo Puyo Tetris 2 tournaments with the aim of expanding competitive Puyo Puyo outside of Japan. The winner of the series would get a paid trip to Japan to participate in the Puyo Puyo Grand Prix Final, which is a Puyo Puyo esport tournament licensed by Sega; as well as a cash prize and a uniform. This is notable as it is the first set of events where players outside of Japan could compete in Sega's esport tournaments.

The following year, Sega announced the Puyo Puyo GLOBAL RANKING SERIES 2025. This expands upon the previous format by awarding "Global Points" based upon how well players perform on three types of tournaments. The first type involves four tournaments hosted and ran by Sega. The second type are four tournaments hosted and ran by Ascension, an international Puyo Puyo community. The last type are tournaments ran by overseas communities. The rankings are made of two divisions based on if the player is in Japan ("Japan Region") or not ("Other Region"). The top 2 players in Japan will be invited to the Puyo Puyo Grand Prix Final; while the top twelve players outside of Japan compete in one last tournament, where the top two winners will be invited to the Puyo Puyo Grand Prix Final. Both Sega and Ascension tournaments are ran on the Steam version of Puyo Puyo Tetris 2, while community tournaments are ran on the Switch or Steam versions of either Puyo Puyo Tetris 2 or Puyo Puyo Champions.

== Sales ==
Sega Sammy reported in 2022 that the sum of games sold, downloads of free-to-play titles, registered IDs totaled 37.7 million. This figure does not account for units sold prior to Sega's acquisition of the series, but the series' sales numbers without the free-to-play titles and registered IDs totals to at least over 10 million, including games from the Compile era of the series.

== Other media ==
For the franchise's 24th anniversary, a stage play adaptation titled Puyo Puyo On Stage ran from May 2–6, 2015, in Japan. In Japan there is a manju treat that looks like one of the Puyos from the games that was called Puyoman. Which was released in 1995 according to the Game Gear version of Madou Monogatari III and was made until Compile shut down on 2003. However Sega started to sell a recreation of Puyoman in 2023 now under the rebranded name of Puyo Puyo Manjyu likely due to D4 owning the Puyoman name.
