= Puyo Puyo Sun =

1996 video game

- Box art for the Nintendo 64 version
- Developers: Compile; M2 (Genesis Mini 2 version)
- Publishers: Compile; Sega (later re-releases)
- Series: Puyo Puyo
- Platforms: Arcade, Sega Saturn, Nintendo 64, PlayStation, Windows, Game Boy Color, Sega Genesis Mini 2 (Note: A port of only the multiplayer mode known as VS Puyo Puyo Sun, developed for the Sega Genesis Mini 2.)
- Release: Arcade: JP: December 1996; Sega Saturn: JP: February 14, 1997; Nintendo 64: JP: October 31, 1997; PlayStation: JP: November 27, 1997; Windows: JP: April 17, 1998; KOR: 1998; Game Boy Color: JP: November 27, 1998; Sega Genesis Mini 2: WW: October 27, 2022
- Genre: Puzzle
- Modes: Single-player, multiplayer
- Arcade system: Sega ST-V

Puyo Puyo Sun (ぷよぷよSUN, Puyopuyo San) is a 1996 puzzle arcade video game developed and published by Compile. It is the third installment of the Puyo Puyo series, and the sequel to Puyo Puyo 2. After the highly acclaimed success of its predecessor, Compile took a slightly more retro approach, so players had a more original feel to the game over that of 2.

The name of Puyo Puyo Sun comes from a Japanese pun on san, and also indicates a new Puyo brought into the game. As Sun Puyo were used in this game, and the game itself is not only set on a tropical beach, but is the third in the series (san (三) is the Japanese word for the number three), the name served multiple purposes.

Puyo Puyo Sun was also released for the PC, which was also translated into Korean. A cut-down port of the game to the Sega Genesis featuring just the versus mode, titled VS Puyo Puyo Sun, was released as part of the Sega Genesis Mini 2 dedicated console in 2022.

== Gameplay ==
Like the previous games, Puyo fall from the top of the screen in pairs, can be moved left and right, and can be rotated clockwise and counter-clockwise by 90°; if the third column from the left fills up to the top, the game is over. The offset (Sousai) and all clear (Zenkeshi) rules from the previous game remain, but every time the player counters, special garbage falls on the screen in a preset pattern (in the Game Boy version of this game, it falls randomly). Every time player clears the screen however, Sun Puyo fall on the screen since the All Clear bonus is removed in this game.

Ports of this game have music slightly different than the arcade original. The Game Boy Color version allows players to unlock special artwork, which can be viewed in the Nintendo 64 version of Puyo Puyo~n using the Transfer Pak.

== Plot ==
Satan (Dark Prince in the series' English localizations) has used special magic to make the Sun bigger on a remote island, hoping to create a paradise where he can relax surrounded by girls in bikinis. Draco Centauros, in the Easy difficulty, uses this as an opportunity to find a spot to get a tan, but gets a sunburn in the ending. Arle Nadja and Schezo, in the Normal and Hard difficulties respectively, find the weather too extreme. Both of them set out to find Satan and stop his plans, but are repeatedly interrupted by others such as Zoh Daimoh, Draco Centauros after her storyline, Suketoudara, Lagnus the Brave (Ragnus in later games), Rulue, and even each other. The ending depends on the playable character; Arle's ending involves Carbuncle firing a laser at the Moon and turning it into a second sun, and Schezo's ending involves him shattering the crystal Satan had used to enlarge the Sun and then being beaten up by Satan, with Schezo asking, "What's with this ending!?"

== Reception ==
Reception

Review scores
Publication	Score
IGN	7.2/10
N64 Magazine	80%

In Japan, Game Machine listed Puyo Puyo Sun on their February 15, 1997 issue as being the fifth most-successful arcade game of the month.
