= Puyo Puyo! 15th Anniversary =

2006 video game

- Nintendo DS cover art
- Developer(s): Sonic Team
- Publisher(s): Sega
- Director(s): Mizuki Hosoyamada
- Producer(s): Akinori Nishiyama
- Designer(s): Misako Hamada; Kohei Takeda; Chisako Nishitani
- Programmer(s): Masafumi Uchida
- Artist(s): Nanako Yarimizu
- Composer(s): Hideki Abe
- Series: Puyo Puyo
- Platform(s): Nintendo DS, PlayStation 2, PlayStation Portable, Wii
- Release: Nintendo DS: JP: December 14, 2006; PlayStation 2, PSP: JP: March 21, 2007; Wii: JP: July 26, 2007
- Genre(s): Puzzle
- Mode(s): Single-player, multiplayer

Puyo Puyo! 15th Anniversary (ぷよぷよ!, Puyopuyo!) is a puzzle video game of the Puyo Puyo series, developed by Sonic Team and published by Sega for the Nintendo DS in 2006, as well as PlayStation 2, PlayStation Portable, and Wii in 2007. It has not been released outside of Japan for any consoles. This is the first Puyo Puyo game to be released on the Wii console.

== Gameplay ==
Puyo Puyo! 15th Anniversary has multiple gameplay modes, including modes based on Puyo Puyo, Puyo Puyo 2, and Puyo Pop Fever. Typically, a Puyo Puyo game is played against either a computer-controlled or player-controlled opponent, and the objective is to survive the longest. This is done by stacking Puyo blobs efficiently in player's play area. If at least the equivalent of four Puyo blobs are touching, this will cause them to disappear, partially clearing out the player's play area. If a set of four or more Puyo blobs being cleared causes another set of them to be cleared, this will send Nuisance Puyo to opponent's play area. The only way to get rid of these Puyos are to clear other Puyos that are adjacent to it. The first one to lose is the one that is unable to place more Puyos in their play area. In addition to the modes based on previous games, there are also modes that change the nature of the gameplay, such as one where Puyos are twice as large. Players can also tweak the rulesets of the modes they play. This game can be played both locally and online, and players without a copy can still play with the DS Download Play function.

== Plot ==
Ms. Accord, the teacher at Primp Magic School, informs Sig of an upcoming tournament where the reward is a medal that will grant any single wish. Sig witnesses six comets fall down onto Earth, but decides to ignore them and joins the competition. It turns out that the comets are actually six characters from the Madou Monogatari series, who serve as boss characters in the story modes.

== Release ==
In the original release of the game, a bug existed where data would not be saved more than 255 times. A new version, nicknamed 1.1, was released to solve the problem in January 2007. Information on how to find out the game version and instructions on how to get replacement can be found on Sega's website.

Because the game was never localized into English, a fan translation into English was created.

== Reception ==
Hardcore Gaming 101 writer Kurt Kalata praised it for its wide variety of modes and characters as well as how engaging the gameplay is. GamesRadar+ staff enjoyed the variety of characters and puzzles, as well as the multiplayer, although they begrudged how difficult online multiplayer could be to set up due to the need for friend codes.
