= Puyo Puyo 7 =

2009 video game

- Nintendo DS cover art
- Developers: Sonic Team h.a.n.d.
- Publisher: Sega
- Director: Takumi Yoshinaga
- Producer: Mizuki Hosoyamada
- Designers: Takako Nagase; Kohei Takeda
- Artist: Akira Mikame
- Composer: Masaru Setsumaru
- Series: Puyo Puyo
- Platforms: Nintendo DS, PlayStation Portable, Wii
- Release: Nintendo DS: JP: July 30, 2009; PlayStation Portable/Wii: JP: November 26, 2009
- Genre: Puzzle
- Modes: Single-player, multiplayer

Puyo Puyo 7 (ぷよぷよ7, Puyo Puyo Sebun) is the seventh installment in the Puyo Puyo series, released in Japan for the Nintendo DS on July 30, 2009, and for the PlayStation Portable and Wii on November 26.

The staple gameplay mode, Great Transformation, allows characters to take on child or adult forms, the Puyos used by them becoming smaller or bigger respectively.

== Gameplay ==
There are five modes of gameplay used in Free Battle games. Except in Mission mode, a player is eliminated when they top out, and the last player (or side) standing wins the round.

Puyo Puyo Great Transformation (ぷよぷよだいへんしん, Puyopuyo Daihenshin)
The main focus of the game. There are two transformations, Mini (ちび, Chibi) and Mega (でか, Deka), with each character having representations of each. The Transformations refer to the grid size, not so much the character representation.
Puyo Puyo Fever (ぷよぷよフィーバー, Puyopuyo Fībā)
This is Fever mode and is identical to the mode in 15th Anniversary.
Puyo Puyo 2 (ぷよぷよ通, Puyopuyo tsū)
This mode emulates the gameplay of Puyo Puyo 2.
Puyo Puyo (ぷよぷよ, Puyopuyo)
This mode emulates the gameplay of the original Puyo Puyo.
Mission Puyo (なぞぷよ, Nazo puyo)
In Mission mode, the player is given a task which they must complete before their opponents. The first player (or side) to complete all tasks wins the round. This mode is named after the Puyo Puyo spin-off game released in 1993.

The story mode focuses mainly on Great Transformation, but has a small number of other modes in addition. The first three modes were also available for use in multiplayer games over Nintendo Wi-Fi Connection until its disconnection in 2014.

== Plot ==
The game opens with a storm of Puyo falling down onto Earth, flooding a high school in its wake. Ringo Ando, a student who witnesses the flood, trembles until Arle Nadja appears. She teaches Ringo how to play Puyo Puyo and fight the many enemies with her skill. Arle soon finds herself being endangered and runs off; Ringo sets out to find her, encountering old and new friends and rivals along the way. During most battles, she is able to use a special ability: she can transform into an adult or a child while playing, which affects the size of the Puyos she uses in the process.

After a match with Klug, Ringo decides that in order to solve the problem, she must travel to seven power spots of the planet, encountering the strongest opponents. During the trek, she discovers that Arle has been possessed by a new adversary: Ecolo. When Ringo comes upon the newly transformed Dark Arle, she defeats her, reverting her to normal. Ecolo decides to bury the universe in Puyos, just for amusement. Ringo, Arle, and Amitie team up to save the day. Ecolo is defeated, and everyone returns home.
