= Puyopuyo!! Quest =

2013 mobile game

- Japanese Google Play app icon
- Developer: Sega
- Publisher: Sega
- Series: Puyo Puyo
- Platforms: iOS, Android, Kindle Fire
- Release: iOS: JP: April 24, 2013; Android: JP: June 11, 2013; Kindle Fire: JP: October 1, 2014
- Genres: Puzzle, role-playing
- Mode: Single-player

Puyopuyo!! Quest Arcade
- Developer: Sega
- Publisher: Sega
- Series: Puyo Puyo
- Platform: Arcade
- Release: JP: November 7, 2013
- Genres: Puzzle, role-playing
- Mode: Single-player

Puyopuyo!! Quest (ぷよぷよ!!クエスト) and Puyopuyo!! Quest Arcade (ぷよぷよ!!クエスト アーケード), are two free-to-play puzzle role-playing video games developed and published by Sega for the iOS, Android, Kindle Fire and Arcade, released in Japan.

The game features the characters from the Puyo Puyo series, and also featured guest characters from several Japanese franchises like Detective Conan, Sailor Moon, and My Melody.

Puyopuyo!! Quest can be linked to its companion arcade game, Puyopuyo!! Quest Arcade. It supports ALL.Net system, and uses Sega's Aime Card to store player data and game progress, which adds a new card to the player's inventory.

== Gameplay ==
The game offers an experience similar to several puzzle role-playing games like Puzzle & Dragons, with a playability different from traditional Puyo Puyo games. The player deletes five types of "Puyo" (red, blue, green, yellow and purple) on a 6x8 square matrix puzzle screen by finger swiping. When four or more puyos of the same color are connected vertically or horizontally, they disappear and their actions are linked to make an ally card attack, corresponding to the color of each card. The board is constantly filling as the player deletes Puyos.

=== Card collection ===
As a gacha game, the player can collect character and item cards to improve them by combining them. These cards can be obtained by completing matches, or by redeeming them with tickets, or magic stones present in the game (the latter can be purchased with real money).

=== Board elements ===
- Coloured Puyos, the main element of the game. When the players match four or more adjacent Puyos horizontally or vertically, they disappear, giving attack points.
- Heart Box, which is popped by popping adjacent Puyos, recovering health points to the player's characters.
- Chance Puyos, that appears when making a 6 chain or higher, or popping 16 or more Puyos simultaneously. By cleaning that Puyo, a "large chain chance" similar to Fever mode is activated, with pre-formed chains, in order to get more attack points.
- Nuisance Puyos, which some enemy cards with certain skills can transform the players Puyos into nuisance Puyos. These cannot be cleaned by sliding player's finger, but by cleaning adjacent Puyos. A variant is the nuisance Puyos, which the adjacent Puyos must be popped once to clean them.
- Prism ball, which will appear thanks to the abilities of certain characters. These objects can be cleaned by deleting adjacent Puyos, giving attack points to the whole player's team.

=== Game modes ===
- One-player quest, where the player can choose between several missions, in which they faces a series of characters controlled by the CPU, in one or more stages. The player must form a team of up to 9 characters, in which the player must strengthen over time in order to win further matches; in most games, the player can choose a guild mate's character, that will be added to the in-game team. Each game is played with up to 5 characters at a time, plus the sixth guild mate character. Certain combinations of members allow to enhance their abilities. Some prizes are given to the player depending on their performance.
- Cooperative multiplayer, where the player plays with up to three more partners (chosen randomly), in a series of missions against the CPU.
- Versus multiplayer, where the player chooses an opponent and plays against the CPU using the selected opponent's team in a limited-time game. The player must form a team of 9 characters, which will play three-on-three at time. The team that beats all the opponent's characters, or the player that has more health points at the time end, wins the game. The player accumulates stars to open a chest with prizes, as well as advancing in the world rankings, depending on their performance.
- Event matches, available during limited-time events. The player chooses the difficulty level, and accumulates points according to their performance, which will result in prizes at the end of those events.

== Reception ==
The game's official website claimed that Puyopuyo!! Quest received over 30 million downloads as of June 2025.

Puyopuyo!! Quest and Puyopuyo!! Quest Arcade were nominated for a CEDEC Award in 2014 in the Game Design department, citing the ingenious linkage of the smartphone and arcade games creates a fulfilling play cycle for players. The pair lost to Kantai Collection for the highest accolade award.

== Status ==
While the Puyopuyo!! Quest servers remain online as of April 2021, Puyopuyo!! Quest Arcade servers were terminated on April 1 of that year. Since its shutdown, playing the game via arcade cabinets was made impossible.

== In other media ==
=== PuyoQue Cafe ===
PuyoQue Cafe (ぷよクエカフェ) is a limited time concept cafe establishment, featuring decoration and menu items inspired by the game's characters. The first installment was opened in Shibuya from September to November 2014, later extended to December the same year. A second installment opened from February to May 2015 at six locations across Japan, including Osaka, Fukuoka, Hiroshima, Ikebukuro, Nagoya and Miyagi.
