= Puyo Puyo Tetris =

2014 video game

- Developer: Sega CS2 (Note: Additional work by Bitbaboon for the Windows version)
- Publishers: JP/NA: Sega; PAL: Deep Silver
- Director: Koji Shindo
- Producer: Mizuki Hosoyamada
- Designer: Hiroyuki Yamazura
- Programmers: Naoto Ogawa; Hiroki Hayami
- Artists: Shoko Kambe; Akira Mikame
- Writer: Utako Yoshino
- Composer: Hideki Abe
- Series: Puyo Puyo; Tetris
- Platforms: Nintendo 3DS; PlayStation Vita; PlayStation 3; Wii U; Xbox One; PlayStation 4; Nintendo Switch; Windows
- Release: February 6, 2014: 3DS, Wii U, PS Vita, PS3; JP: February 6, 2014 Xbox One; JP: December 4, 2014 PlayStation 4; JP: December 4, 2014; NA: April 25, 2017; EU: April 28, 2017; AU: May 12, 2017 Switch; JP: March 3, 2017; NA: April 25, 2017; EU: April 28, 2017; AU: May 12, 2017 Windows; WW: February 27, 2018
- Genre: Puzzle
- Modes: Single-player, multiplayer

Puyo Puyo Tetris (ぷよぷよテトリス, Puyopuyo Tetorisu) (Note: Puyo Puyo Tetris S (ぷよぷよテトリスS) for the Japanese Nintendo Switch release) is a 2014 puzzle video game developed by Sega CS2 and published by Sega. The game is a crossover between the Puyo Puyo series and the Tetris franchise, and features various gameplay modes incorporating both aspects. The game includes characters modeled and named after the seven Tetrominos, which are the different, four-block puzzle pieces used in Tetris.

Puyo Puyo Tetris was the first Tetris-related title published by Sega since the PlayStation 2 game Sega Ages 2500: Tetris Collection, an installment in the Sega Ages series, in 2006. Puyo Puyo Tetris adopts the guidelines used in contemporary Tetris games, so the rotation patterns and colors of the Tetrominoes differ from Sega's previous releases.

Puyo Puyo Tetris was released for the Nintendo 3DS, Wii U, PlayStation Vita and PlayStation 3 in Japan in February 2014, followed by versions for PlayStation 4 and Xbox One in December the same year, and Nintendo Switch in March 2017 as a launch title. The Nintendo Switch and PlayStation 4 versions were released outside of Japan in April 2017, marking the first English localization of a Puyo Puyo game since Puyo Pop Fever in 2004. A Windows version was released in February 2018. It was followed up by a sequel titled Puyo Puyo Tetris 2 in 2020.

== Gameplay ==
Gameplay screenshot showing four players, two of which are Tetris and two others Puyo Puyo

Puyo Puyo Tetris centers around the combination of two main gameplay styles, Puyo and Tetris. In the Puyo Puyo style, colored blobs known as Puyos will fall from the top of the screen and can be rotated before being placed down. The Puyos can be popped by matching four and more of the same color next to each other. By carefully arranging the Puyos, players can perform chain combos in which additional Puyos are matched and popped as they fall into place, earning more points as a result. The Tetris style, on the other hand, has players placing shaped blocks known as Tetrominos down on the playing field. Successfully filling a complete horizontal line of blocks on the field will make it disappear, and additional points can be earned clearing multiple lines at once. In Puyo style, the game ends if a Puyo reaches the X mark. In Tetris style, the game ends if Tetrominos pile up over the top of the playing field.

Using these two gameplay styles, Puyo Puyo Tetris features five main game modes, each of which can be played with up to four players, both locally or online, or against computer opponents. With the exception of Swap and Fusion modes, each player can independently choose between Puyo and Tetris styles. Versus mode is a standard match in which players face off against each other with their chosen style. By performing chain combos in Puyo style or clearing lines in Tetris style, garbage is sent over to the player's opponents, which appears as Garbage Puyos in Puyo style and added lines in Tetris style. In most cases, players are eliminated once their playing field is filled over the top, and the last player (or side) standing wins the round.

Party mode throws in power-ups that can give the player benefits or hinder opponents. The player who has the highest score at the end of a time limit wins the match, and players won't be eliminated from filling up the board in this mode. Swap mode has the players periodically alternate between Puyo and Tetris styles, each on its own board. Players are eliminated when one of their boards become completely filled. Fusion mode combines both Puyo and Tetris styles onto one board, with Tetrinimoes sinking below any Puyos when placed. Big Bang mode combines Fever mode from Puyo Puyo with Lucky Attack from Tetris. Depending on the style, players must quickly clear waves of pre-arranged Puyos or Tetris blocks, aiming to clear as many waves as possible within a time limit. After each time limit, players are dealt damage depending on how much slower they were against the leading player. Players are eliminated if they run out of health, and the last player (or side) standing wins the match. There is also an Adventure story mode campaign consisting of various battles against computer opponents and mode-specific challenges, and six single-player Challenge modes: Endless Fever, Endless Puyo, and Tiny Puyo for the Puyo style; Sprint, Marathon, and Ultra for the Tetris style. Playing through each mode earns credits that can be spent in an in-game shop to unlock different art styles for Puyos and Tetriminoes and alternate voice packs.

== Story ==
After the power of Puyos reunites Ringo with Amitie, Arle Nadja, and Carbuncle, they are suddenly alerted by the appearance of strange blocks (Tetriminos) raining down on their world. They are then transported to a spaceship known as the SS Tetra, where they meet Tee and his crew, who come from a world where they battle using Tetris instead of Puyo Puyo. After the ship crash lands on Ringo's world, the girls help Tee repair his ship, only to discover some of their friends are acting strangely, foretelling the merging of dimensions. After managing to cure their friends of this mind control, the gang search in space to find who is responsible for the merging of the two dimensions. Upon reaching the edge of spacetime, they finally come across the Keeper of Dimensions and former captain of the SS Tetra, Ex, who has felt lonely from having to maintain the two dimensions. Tee offers to take Ex's place as Keeper, but luckily Ecolo and the Dark Prince manage to create a portal between the SS Tetra and the edge of spacetime so Tee can visit Ex at any time. With the matter solved, Tee and his crew bid farewell to Ringo and her friends as their dimensions are once again separated.

In 3 bonus acts (DLC in JP), the cast is thrown into "Dream" scenarios. The first features some of the cast putting on a talent show with Ringo as the host. The second features Schezo going after Sig for his red hand but later rejects it after finding out it is home to his bug collection. The third one features Ex on the SS Tetra and wonder why he is there, only to find out it is a dream of his first encounter with Tee with a bunch of unexpected guest invading it like Dark Prince and Ringo.

== Development and release ==
Puyo Puyo Tetris was originally scheduled to be the direct sequel to Puyo Puyo 7, but due to various circumstances, it was rescheduled that Puyo Puyo!! 20th Anniversary be released next and this game was pushed later. It was initially released for the Nintendo 3DS, Wii U, PlayStation 3 (following the replacement of EA's Tetris on PS3), and PlayStation Vita in Japan on February 6, 2014. Ports for the PlayStation 4 and Xbox One were later released in December the same year, and included all DLC from the other versions. The Xbox One version is one of the seven Xbox One titles to be Japan exclusive. A Nintendo Switch version called Puyo Puyo Tetris S, which also contained all previously released DLC, was released in Japan alongside the system itself as a launch title, on March 3, 2017.

The PlayStation 4 and Nintendo Switch versions were later localized in English and released in April 2017. The Switch version was released as Puyo Puyo Tetris.

In February 2018, multiple games on the Steam marketplace published by Sega were given additions to their news feeds. These titles included Nights into Dreams, Tembo the Badass Elephant, Jet Set Radio, Binary Domain, and more. These posts were ASCII art representations of different Puyos and Tetriminos, hinting at the idea that there would be a PC port, which was officially confirmed by Sega on February 6, and was released on Steam on February 27. This port contained all previous DLC, as well as 4K output support and the option to switch between the original Japanese voiceover and the English voiceover. It was criticized for using the Denuvo DRM system to prevent cheating and piracy. The game suffered from issues at launch, but Sega has since fixed many user-reported bugs and crashes.

== Reception ==
Reception

Aggregate scores
Aggregator	Score
Metacritic	PS4: 83/100; NS: 81/100; PC: 78/100
OpenCritic	85% recommend

Review scores
Publication	Score
4Players	85/100
Destructoid	9.5/10
Edge	8/10
Electronic Gaming Monthly	4/5
Eurogamer	Recommended
Famitsu	35/40
Game Informer	7/10
GameRevolution	4/5
GameSpot	8/10
GamesTM	8/10
Hardcore Gamer	4.5/5
IGN	8.7/10
Nintendo Life	8/10
Nintendo World Report	9/10
PlayStation Official Magazine – UK	7/10
Play	8/10
Push Square	9/10
USgamer	3.5/5

PlayStation LifeStyle gave the Vita version 8/10 and called it "an example of a franchise entry done right", somewhat disliking Big Bang Mode but with high praise for Adventure and Swap. Famitsu gave the game a score of 9/9/9/8. Eurogamer ranked the PlayStation 4 and Switch versions 24th on their list of the "Top 50 Games of 2017".

The 3DS version was the best-selling one in Japan, with 44,627 units sold in the first week compared to 10,306 for the PS3 version and 8,973 for the PS Vita version. The Wii U version did not chart. By November 2020, the game had sold over 1.4 million copies worldwide.

The PS4 and Switch versions won the award for "Game, Puzzle" at the National Academy of Video Game Trade Reviewers Awards.

== Sequel ==
A sequel, titled Puyo Puyo Tetris 2, was released in December 2020 on Nintendo Switch, PlayStation 4, PlayStation 5, Xbox One, and Xbox Series X, with a 2021 release for Windows and Steam.
