= Puyo Pop (video game) =

2001 video game

- North American cover art
- Developers: Sonic Team; Caret House
- Publisher: Sega: NA: THQ (GBA)
- Director: Akinori Nishiyama
- Producer: Yuji Naka
- Programmers: Atsushi Ohike; Akira Semimaru
- Artist: Yuji Uekawa
- Composer: Hideki Abe
- Series: Puyo Puyo
- Platforms: Game Boy Advance, N-Gage
- Release: Game Boy Advance: JP: October 18, 2001; NA: February 4, 2002; EU: April 2, 2002; N-Gage: NA: October 6, 2003; EU: October 7, 2003
- Genre: Puzzle
- Modes: Single-player, multiplayer

Puyo Pop, known as Minna de Puyo Puyo (みんなでぷよぷよ; "Everybody Puyo Puyo") in Japan, is the first of the Puyo Puyo games made for the Game Boy Advance, and the first produced by Sonic Team. It is the last game to solely use the original Madō Monogatari cast, as later games would introduce many new characters to go alongside them.

The Japanese title refers to the game's four player mode and became a staple in future games. The Western title is simply named Puyo Pop (a recycled title from the Neo-Geo Pocket version of Puyo Puyo 2).

== Gameplay ==
The game is divided into several modes. The Single Puyo Puyo mode is essentially the game's story mode. Each course is unlocked as Arle Nadja progresses through the story. An interesting feature of this mode is the ability to attain and deliver various items throughout the courses. The item side quest can be played after clearing the game. Each item is received after the player completes the course for the second time. The player navigates through six different areas - Hamaji Forest, Gold Town, Gachinko Dungeon, Magical Tower, Dark Prince Castle and Trial Labyrinth - each with their own Special Rule. The first five areas are each unlocked by completing the one before it, but Trial Labyrinth has to be unlocked after completing an item delivery quest following the completion of the first five areas a second time.

Double Puyo Puyo and Everybody Puyo Puyo are the game's two player and four player modes respectively. They allow for both single and multi-cart play. The Point and Hard Puyo rules can be used once they are unlocked. Carbuncle and the Dark Prince can also be used once they have been unlocked.

Unique to Puyo Pop is the Card Collection, a series of item delivery quests allowing the player to collect character cards of the cast. These can only be performed after the player has already beaten the normal story mode once. Once collected, the cards act as a gallery system typical of the genre, featuring artwork of the character and allowing the player to hear their voices by pressing the A button. There are 20 cards in all, with cards 19 and 20 playing music not otherwise used in the game.

== Plot ==
The Dark Prince, the main "villain" from the previous games, is once again up to no good. He splits up five gold runes, and they are handed off to different individuals across the globe. The Dark Prince then sets up a Puyo Puyo contest. Carbuncle runs off for it, and Arle gives chase, thus starting her strange journey to collect the runes and find Carbuncle. At the end, it is revealed that the runes are actually a ticket for Arle and himself to go and bathe at some hot springs, made from the finest curry powder with the faintest scent for Carbuncle to trace. Arle then breaks the curry blocks, foiling the Dark Prince once again and leaving him to cry hysterically, whilst Arle uses the blocks to make curry.

== Reception ==
Reception

Review scores
Publication	Score
GameSpy	89%
Detroit Free Press	3/4

Puyo Pop received mostly positive reviews. It received a score of 84/100 at Metacritic, based on 14 reviews.

IGN cited it as "a fantastic puzzle game that's enhanced simply by letting a development team exploit the Game Boy Advance's link capabilities as far as it can go. Four player Puyo Pop is just so much fun and highly recommended". GameSpy reviewed Puyo Pop favorably, noting that despite the rather dark charcoal-gray background, the game looks good on the GBA, has a "highly-addictive style of gameplay" and is "strong game for the GBA system".
