= Puyo Puyo 2 =

1994 video game

- Japanese arcade flyer
- Developers: Compile; Sega (re-releases); Bits Laboratory (SS); Goo! (PCE); M2 (Nintendo 3DS)
- Publishers: JP/KOR: Compile; JP/NA/PAL: Sega (PS2, re-releases); JP: Bandai (WS); JP: NEC Interchannel (PCE); JP/NA/EU: SNK (NGPC); JP: Bohtec (Quest Corp) (Mac)
- Series: Puyo Puyo
- Platform: Arcade: Super Famicom, Sega Saturn, PlayStation, PlayStation 2, Mega Drive, Game Gear, Game Boy, PC, NEC PC-9801, Windows 95, Macintosh, PC Engine CD, Neo-Geo Pocket Color, WonderSwan
- Release: September 1994: Arcade; JP: September 1994 Mega Drive; JP: December 2, 1994 Game Gear; JP: December 16, 1994 PC-9801; JP: October 27, 1995 Sega Saturn; JP: October 27, 1995; JP: June 20, 1997 (reprint) Super Famicom; JP: December 8, 1995; JP: March 8, 1996 (remix); NA: September 9, 2019 Windows 95'; JP: 1995; KOR: 1997 PC Engine CD; JP: March 29, 1996 PlayStation; JP: November 15, 1996; JP: March 30, 2000 (PlayStation the Best) Game Boy; JP: December 13, 1996 Macintosh; JP: July 4, 1998 WonderSwan; JP: March 11, 1999 Neo Geo Pocket Color; JP: July 22, 1999; NA: September 30, 1999; EU: November 26, 1999 PlayStation 2; JP: May 24, 2004 Arcade; JP: June 7, 2011 Sega Mega Drive (Wii Virtual Console); JP: April 24, 2007; NA: March 10, 2008 Nintendo 3DS Game Gear; JP: December 25, 2013 Arcade; JP: December 23, 2015; NA: April 26, 2016; EU: November 4, 2016
- Genre: Puzzle
- Modes: Single-player, multiplayer

Puyo Puyo 2 (ぷよぷよ通, Puyo Puyo Tsū) is a 1994 puzzle video game developed and published by Compile. It is the second installment in the Puyo Puyo series and the sequel to Puyo Puyo (1992).

Due to its highly acclaimed success, it became the most predominant game of the series. Though with many of its rules being experimental, the ability of Sousai (相殺, sōsai; the damage offset rule) and Rensa Sibari (連鎖縛り, rensa shibari; a custom rule that causes chains with fewer than a set number of steps to score nothing and to send no garbage) became a top hit immediately, thus creating longer matches for better gameplay. Also due to its successes, it became the most widely known multiplatform game in Japan, appearing in the Arcade, on major domestic consoles, on major handhelds, on the NEC PC-9800 series, on the PC, and on others.

The name of Puyo Puyo 2/Tsū derives from an English pun, as "tsu" (通, tsū; meaning Expert) when spoken aloud sounds similar to the English word "two". Compile used similar puns for Puyo Puyo SUN and Puyo Puyo~n.

== Gameplay ==
Just like the first game, Puyo fall from the top of the screen in pairs, can be moved left and right, and can be rotated clockwise and counter-clockwise by 90°; if the third column from the left fills up to the top, the game is over. The game has multiple new rules. The first extended rule added to this game was called "Offsetting". This will allow a player to counter and negate Garbage Puyos being sent by the opponent with chains of their own. Offsetting can also be used to send the Puyos back to the opponent, known as "Garbage overflow". The standard ojamas were kept with the release of Puyo Puyo 2, but two new garbage types also appeared, known as Point Puyos and Hard Puyos. Point Puyos, when erased adjacently with neighbouring groups of Puyos, add points to the player's overall score, and can also make chains more powerful in the short-term. Hard Puyos, when they land on the field, are harder to erase than Standard Garbage or Point Puyos, and are often referred to as Steelies.

Unlike its predecessor, Puyo Puyo 2 has three different modes for each type. The three main modes are, Single Puyo Puyo, Double Puyo Puyo, and Endless Puyo Puyo. For Super Puyo Puyo 2, and Super Puyo Puyo 2 Remix, using a Super Multitap, an additional mode known as Minna de Puyo Puyo (Everybody Puyo Puyo, also the name of a Puyo Puyo game for the Game Boy Advance), means that up to 4 players (though for Remix, including a COM player) can play. Single Puyo Puyo is a story mode. In an attempt not only to steal Arle Nadja's heart, but also to nab Carbuncle, the Dark Prince sets up a battle tower, in which Arle has to beat characters on each floor to climb up the tower. As Arle wins every match, she gains bonus points which add on to her total score, and this acts as Experience. The chains are balanced to be weaker and do less damage than in the first game, providing a greater chance to make a comeback. There are five predefined rule sets available in the versus menu. The player can set custom rules. Multiplayer lets multiple players play together.

== Development and legacy ==
Puyo Puyo 2 was originally developed by Compile and released by Sega for arcades in 1994, and became the biggest arcade game to have been played in Japan since the arrival of Street Fighter II. The success of the game prompted Compile to port the game to several consoles and computers, including the Super Famicom, Mega Drive, PC Engine, Game Boy, Game Gear, Sega Saturn, PlayStation, PC under Windows 95, WonderSwan, Neo Geo Pocket Color, PlayStation 2, et al. The Game Boy Advance game Puyo Pop is also heavily inspired by this particular installment of the series.

The Super Famicom version added a 4-player mode - Compile's first attempt at such a mode for a domestic console - with the use of a multitap. Without a multitap, it is impossible to play with more than two people, as the Super NES only has two controller ports. Translation group J2E would translate this version in 2001. Months later, Compile released Super Puyo Puyo 2 Remix (す〜ぱ〜ぷよぷよ通リミックス), a special version of the Super Famicom game that allowed up to 4 players to play without the need of the multitap, by replacing the human players with computer ones. This version also included two new Extended Training and Special Modes, as well as other features. A port was also released for the PC Engine (in Super CD-ROM² format) titled Puyo Puyo CD 2 (ぷよぷよCD通). Other cases include the PC Engine CD, Saturn and PlayStation versions, which add voice-overs and cutscenes. The PC version of Puyo Puyo 2 was the only version to include a separate Nazo Puyo quest, as the CD versions had a "cut-down" version included into them. This version was also translated into Korean. To show the success of Puyo Puyo 2, in the Sega Ages 2500 series for the PlayStation 2, Sega released a version titled Sega Ages 2500 series Vol. 12: Puyo Puyo 2 PERFECT SET (セガエイジズ2500シリーズ Vol.12 ぷよぷよ通パーフェクトセット), which paid tribute to one of the most popular versions, the Sega Saturn version. Only one version of Puyo Puyo 2 was internationally released, and that was Puyo Pop for the Neo Geo Pocket Color, which was the first Puyo Puyo game to use the international title of Puyo Pop, but the third Western release after Dr. Robotnik's Mean Bean Machine and Kirby's Ghost Trap/Avalanche.

The Sega Mega Drive version of Puyo Puyo 2 saw a western release for the first time on March 10, 2008, on the Wii console's Virtual Console service, remaining untranslated.

In 2016, developer M2 released Puyo Puyo 2 for the Nintendo 3DS as a part of the Sega 3D Classics Collection game pack. The game itself still remained untranslated.

An arcade version was released for the Nintendo Switch under the Sega Ages Puyo Puyo 2 (SEGA AGES ぷよぷよ通) brand in 2019. The US version contained a database translating all the information seen right before battling a character, but the ROM itself was left untranslated.

Super Puyo Puyo 2 received an untranslated re-release via the Nintendo Classics service in February 2021.

== Reception ==
In Japan, Game Machine listed Puyo Puyo 2 on their November 1, 1994 issue as being the fourth most-successful table arcade unit of the month. It went on to be Japan's fourth highest-grossing arcade printed circuit board (PCB) software of 1995.
