= Puyo Puyo (video game) =

1991 video game

- Japanese Mega Drive cover art, featuring protagonist Arle
- Developer: Compile (Note: Arcade version developed by Sega AM1; FM Towns version developed by CRI; Game Boy version developed by Compile and Winkysoft.)
- Publishers: Compile: MSX, PC-9801; Compile; Famicom Disk System, Famicom; Compile; Tokuma Shoten; Arcade, Mega Drive, Game Gear, mobile; Sega; Super Famicom, Game Boy; Banpresto; FM Towns; CRI; X68000; SPS Co., Ltd.; CD-ROM²; NEC Avenue; Windows, Mac OS; Bothtec
- Directors: Masanobu Tsukamoto (FC and 1992–1996 releases)
- Producer: Masamitsu Niitani
- Programmers: Mitsugi Tanaka: MSX2, Famicom Disk System, Famicom; Mitsugi Tanaka; Mega Drive; K. Yoshinaka; Super Famicom; Takayuki Hirono; Game Gear; Nattoh; Game Boy; Shigemitsu Takamiya; CD-ROM²; Masashi Katsuragi
- Composers: List: MSX; Masanobu Tsukamoto; Akiyoshi Nagao; Toshiaki Sakoda; Masaaki Harada; Famicom Disk System, Famicom; Masaaki Harada; Game Boy; Daisuke Fujimoto
- Series: Puyo Puyo
- Platform: List: MSX2, Famicom Disk System, arcade, Mega Drive, Game Gear, PC-9801, Famicom, Super Famicom, FM Towns, X68000, PC Engine CD-ROM², Game Boy, Windows, Windows CE, Mac OS, mobile phone
- Release: October 25, 1991: MSX2, Famicom Disk System; JP: October 25, 1991 Arcade; JP: October 1992; EU: 1992 Mega Drive; JP: December 18, 1992 Game Gear, PC-9801; JP: March 19, 1993 Famicom; JP: July 23, 1993 Super Famicom; JP: December 10, 1993 FM Towns; JP: March 18, 1994 X68000; JP: July 29, 1994 CD-ROM²; JP: April 22, 1994 Game Boy; JP: July 31, 1994 Windows 3.1; JP: May 28, 1995 Windows 95; JP: August 2, 1996 Windows CE2; JP: May 29, 1998 Mac OS; JP: December 28, 1996 Mobile i-appli; JP: April 2, 2001 J-Sky; JP: November 14, 2001 EZweb; JP: December 18, 2002 BREW; JP: October 2, 2003
- Genre: Puzzle
- Modes: Single-player, multiplayer

Puyo Puyo (ぷよぷよ) is a 1991 puzzle video game developed and published by Compile for the MSX2. It is the first installment of the Puyo Puyo series, and uses characters from Compile's 1990 role-playing game Madō Monogatari. The game was produced by Compile founder Masamitsu "Moo" Niitani, who was inspired by certain elements from the Tetris and Dr. Mario series of games.

The game was released for the Famicom Disk System by Tokuma Shoten on the same day of the MSX2 release under the name Famimaga Disk Vol. 5: Puyo Puyo (ファミマガディスク Vol.5 ぷよぷよ, Famimaga Disuku Boryūmu Faibu: Puyo Puyo) and as part of the Famimaga Disk series. A year after the MSX2 and FDS versions, Sega released an arcade version that heavily expanded upon the original versions by including a one-player story mode and a two-player competitive mode.

== Gameplay ==
The main game of Puyo Puyo is played against at least one opponent, computer or human. The game itself has three modes, Single Puyo Puyo, Double Puyo Puyo, and Endless Puyo Puyo. In Single mode, the player takes on the role of Arle Nadja, a 16-year-old female spellcaster that has the pleasure of foiling the Dark Prince's plans. The Dark Prince wishes to take over the world, and Arle stands in his way. As such, Arle must first however battle her way through 12 opponents before facing the Dark Prince. With the exception of Rulue, they are not sent by the Dark Prince, and mostly they just want to pull shenanigans with her (for Rulue, she fell in love with the Dark Prince). Once Arle has beaten the Dark Prince, the world is saved, so she can return home. As in all main Puyo games, the story mode consists of playing Puyo matches against a fixed sequence of characters in one of three courses. In Double mode, two players play against each other. In exactly the same fashion as before, by out-chaining one another, the player tries to fill up their opponent's grid. Since the rules of sending so many garbage blocks made games short-lived, no matter how many chains are sent, Compile added the rule of Offsetting in Puyo Puyo 2 and onwards. This lets players counter opponents' attacks with chains of their own, sending any garbage blocks back to them as a result of overflow. In endless mode, the player must continually match puyos to get the highest score they can. In Mission mode, the player must complete 52 missions requiring the Puyos on the field to be eliminated by using limited pieces.

== Development ==
An English-translated version of the arcade original was created and released internationally which replaces the original voice work, changes many of the characters' names, and removes the wings of the Harpies (which are called Dark Elves in the English version). Sega released Puyo Puyo for the Mega Drive on December 18, 1992 and the Game Gear on March 19, 1993 in Japan. The Game Gear version contains an English version named Puzlow Kids; this version appears whenever the game cartridge is used in a North American or European system. A PC-9801 port was released by Compile on the same day the Game Gear port was released. Tokuma Shoten re-released their version Puyo Puyo for the Family Computer on July 23 of the same year, which added a two-player competitive mode. Banpresto released a version for the Super Famicom under the title Super Puyo Puyo (す〜ぱ〜 ぷよぷよ, Sūpā Puyo Puyo) on December 10, 1993. In 1994, a port for the Game Boy was developed by Winkysoft, published by Banpresto and released on July 31 under the original name. NEC Avenue released their version of Puyo Puyo for the PC Engine CD-ROM² on April 22, titled Puyo Puyo CD (ぷよぷよCD, Puyo Puyo Shī Dī). CRI released their version of Puyo Puyo for the FM Towns in December.

Before the series was branded as Puyo Pop internationally, the Genesis version of the first game saw release outside Japan in 1993 as Dr. Robotnik's Mean Bean Machine in North America and Europe; this version omitted the characters and setting of the original release, replacing them with characters from the Adventures of Sonic the Hedgehog animated series. The Game Gear version was likewise altered for North America and Europe, and also ported to the Master System in Europe. Two years later, the game was released for the SNES as Kirby's Avalanche in North America and as Kirby's Ghost Trap in Europe, utilizing characters from Nintendo's Kirby series.

== Reception ==
Reception

Review scores
Publication	Score
Famitsu	24/40 (CD-ROM²)
Mean Machines Sega	90% (Mega Drive)

In Japan, Game Machine listed the arcade version of Puyo Puyo as the fifth most successful table arcade unit of December 1992.

The Mega Drive version was a bestseller in Japan for four months.

== Legacy ==
The Mega Drive version was re-released for the Wii Virtual Console in Japan on December 2, 2006, while the arcade version was released on April 12, 2011. The arcade VC release features online play.

The arcade version was re-released for the Nintendo Switch under the Sega Ages Puyo Puyo (SEGA AGES ぷよぷよ) brand in August 2019, with online play features.

Several clones of the game were created in the years following the game's release. Super Foul Egg was one such clone created for the Amiga by request of Amiga Power magazine and was featured on a cover disk. It was then ported to RISC OS on Acorn by Owain Cole (and featured on an Acorn User cover disk), and finally ported to Java.

In late 1995, it was ported to the Apple IIGS by Bret Victor.
