= Puyo Pop Fever =

2003 puzzle video game

- North American GameCube cover art
- Developer: Sonic Team (Note: Ported to the Game Boy Advance and Nintendo DS by ENTER and Milestone respectively.)
- Publisher: Sega (Note: The North American Nintendo DS release was localised and published by Atlus in North America.)
- Director: Takashi Yuda
- Producer: Yuji Naka
- Artist: Yuji Uekawa
- Composer: Hideki Abe
- Series: Puyo Puyo
- Engine: RenderWare (PS2, GC, Xbox)
- Platform: Arcade: PlayStation 2, Dreamcast, GameCube, Xbox, Mac OS X, Game Boy Advance, Windows, Pocket PC, Palm OS, Nintendo DS, PlayStation Portable, Xbox 360, Android, iOS
- Release: November 2003: Arcade; JP: November 2003 PlayStation 2; JP: February 4, 2004; PAL: February 27, 2004 Dreamcast; JP: February 24, 2004 GameCube; PAL: February 27, 2004; JP: March 24, 2004; NA: July 20, 2004 Xbox; PAL: February 27, 2004; JP: April 24, 2004 Mac OS X; JP: June 24, 2004 Game Boy Advance; JP: July 24, 2004; PAL: March 24, 2005 Windows; JP: September 24, 2004 Pocket PC; JP: October 24, 2004 Palm; JP: November 24, 2004 Java; WW: December 14, 2004 Nintendo DS; JP: December 24, 2004; NA: May 3, 2005; PAL: July 21, 2005 PlayStation Portable; JP: December 24, 2004; PAL: May 19, 2006 Xbox 360; JP: December 4, 2007 Android; WW: August 2012
- Genre: Puzzle
- Modes: Single-player, multiplayer
- Arcade system: NAOMI

Puyo Pop Fever (Note: Japanese: ぷよぷよフィーバー, Hepburn: Puyopuyo Fībā) is a 2003 puzzle video game developed by Sonic Team and published by Sega. It is the fifth main installment in the Puyo Puyo series, and the second Puyo Puyo game to be programmed by Sonic Team after Puyo Pop (which was released just after the series' original developer, Compile, went bankrupt). This was the start of what can be considered a reboot of the Puyo Puyo franchise, with this entry's plot revolving around Professor Accord losing her flying cane.

Sega, which acquired the series' character rights from Compile in 1998, and eventually the full rights in 2001, published all the Japanese releases of the game, and also published the arcade and GameCube versions internationally. The game was scarcely released internationally, and certain versions were released by other publishers in those areas.

== Gameplay ==
The basic game mechanics are mainly similar to those of Puyo Puyo: the player has a 6x12 board, and must decide where to place incoming groups of variously colored blobs, or puyo. After placing each set of puyo, any groups of four or more of the same colored adjacent puyo will pop. Any above will fall down and can form more groups for a chain reaction.

Each time groups of puyo pop, the player will score points and send "trash" (aka "garbage" and "nuisance") to their opponent. Garbage temporarily gets stored in a bar above the playfield, represented by symbols and warning the player of an incoming amount of garbage. These trash puyo are colorless and will only pop when puyo next to them do so, rather than in groups as normal. These will only fall if the player fails to make a chain, and trash falls in groups of 30 (one rock) at a time. When a player's board fills up, either if they cannot make groups or if they are sent a large amount of trash (usually the latter), they lose and the other player will win.

A new addition to the game mechanics is Fever mode, which occurs when a bar in the middle of the screen is filled up. To fill the bar, one must offset (or counterattack) the trash being sent to the field by the opponent. Every chain, which is a single popping of puyo, will fill one space in the fever meter until it is full, which is when fever activates. In Fever mode, a pre-designed chain will fall onto an empty field. In a limited amount of time, one must find a trigger point in the puzzle, which will cause a large chain to go off and attack the opponent. Once a chain is made, another puzzle falls, bigger and more complicated than the previous one. This keeps occurring until time runs out, then it returns the player to their original field.

The Nintendo DS version supports 2 to 8 players, as opposed to the others, which only support 2 or 4. In this mode, one can play as any available character. The GameCube, Xbox, and PS2 versions used 3D models for the Puyos instead of the sprites used in all other versions.

There is also an Endless mode, where one can practice fever mode, complete small tasks as they are given, or play the original game, but the grid and all clear rules remain the same as they do in Fever, so it is not exactly classic.

== Plot ==
Ms. Accord, a teacher at the Primp Magic School, has lost her Flying Cane, the equivalent of a magic wand, and claims to have a reward for the student who can find it. The player plays the role of either Amitie or Raffine, students at the school, as they venture across the Puyo Pop Fever world to find the cane, while meeting many wacky characters along the way and battling them. Raffine's course contains more difficult gameplay and alters the characters the player meets, as well as which character actually finds the wand. When playing as Raffine near to the end of the game, it is revealed that Accord never actually lost her flying cane. Raffine then plans on revealing her and Popoi's secret, but fails in her ending, as she is knocked unconscious by Ms. Accord, losing all memories of the flying cane incident. She regains consciousness near her school where Amitie and her friends congratulate her.

== Release ==
The GameCube and Nintendo DS versions were released in North America, with Atlus handling publishing duties for the latter. Europe received both versions plus the PlayStation 2, Xbox, Game Boy Advance, and PlayStation Portable versions. The Dreamcast version, the last first-party release for the console, was exclusively released in Japan on February 24, 2004, nearly three years after the system was discontinued.

There were also plans to release the Xbox version in North America, but the idea was later scrapped. Puyo Pop Fever is listed as a backward compatible game for the Xbox 360 and is playable on newer Xbox One and Series X|S consoles. Despite this, users have reported difficulties with region-specific versions and a lack of physical availability.

=== Soundtrack ===
PuyoPuyo Fever 1&2 Sound Track ぷよぷよフィーバー1&2サウンドトラック (Puyo Puyo Fībā Saundotorakku) for both games Puyo Pop Fever and Puyo Puyo Fever 2 was released on July 26, 2007. The track has a total of 45 tracks.

=== Mobile remake ===
On February 1, 2009, Sega released a remake of Puyo Puyo Fever in Japan for iOS and Android, titled Puyo Puyo Fever Touch (ぷよぷよフィーバー Touch, Puyo Puyo Fībā Touch). In 2012 the game was released for the Sony NWZ-E470 Walkman music player as a preloaded game.

== Reception ==
Reception

Aggregate scores
Aggregator	Score
GameRankings	NGC: 73% DS: 74% PSP: 67%
Metacritic	NGC: 72/100; DS: 76/100; PSP: 68/100

Edge ranked the game #64 on its list of "The 100 Best Games To Play Today", stating that "behind sugary visuals lies a game that revels in bringing about the ultimate chain reaction, the play area riddled with hidden score opportunities until the entire screen collapses into implosions of multipliers".

== Sequel ==
A sequel, titled Puyo Puyo Fever 2, was released in November 2005 for PlayStation 2 and PlayStation Portable, and for Nintendo DS in December. The game was not released outside of Japan. It features the same style and gameplay, as well as a third protagonist named Sig. Each protagonist has their own story and three sets of difficulties each, as well as items that can be used in story mode. Another new mode is called "Chu Panic", which is similar to endless mode but with a bar that increases every turn; when the bar is full, pink nuisance Puyo queue up. Another mode added was one where the player fights one character after another, with each character being more difficult than the last. The former mode was not included in future Puyo Puyo titles, while the latter has. Hardcore Gaming 101 writer Will M criticized the title for being too similar to its predecessor, arguing that the new content was not enough to differentiate it.

== Legacy ==
In Sega Superstars, there is a game based on Puyo Pop Fever, though the gameplay differs from the original game. Players must position their bodies to get the Puyos into a pot of the same color. Bombs will also fall, and if they get into a pot, points are lost.

In Sega Superstars Tennis, a minigame based on Puyo Pop Fever is featured. Players have to clear Puyos by hitting the ball at them. If the ball hits a Puyo touching another Puyo of the same color, all of them disappear and extra points are awarded. Occasionally, some Puyos become garbage Puyos that do not disappear when the ball hits them, but they can be cleared if one of the colored Puyos attached to them are hit. This minigame is played on the stage based on Nights into Dreams.
