= Madō Monogatari =

Video game series

- Madō Monogatari 1-2-3 cover art
- Genre: Role-playing
- Developers: Compile (1989-1998); D4 Enterprise (2005-present); Compile Heart (2013-present); ZeroDiv (2013)
- Publishers: Compile (1989-1998); Sega (1993-1994); NEC Avenue (PCE); D4 Enterprise (2005-present); Compile Heart (2013-present)
- First release: Madō Monogatari Episode II: Carbuncle; December 10, 1989
- Latest release: Madō Monogatari: Fia and the Mysterious School; November 28, 2024
- Spin-offs: Puyo Puyo

Madō Monogatari, (Note: 魔導物語 (lit. 'A tale of sorcery' or 'A story of sorcery') romanized as Madou Monogatari or Madoh Monogatari in some versions.) formerly known as Sorcery Saga outside Japan, is a dungeon crawler role-playing video game franchise created by Compile. The first game was released in 1990 for MSX2. Sega published the Game Gear remakes based on 1-2-3. The characters of this series would later be used in the puzzle game Puyo Puyo.

The plot of the first game consists of a six-year-old named Arle Nadja, who has passed the written test and needs to scale a giant tower to pass the actual test. In the second game, ten years later, Arle Nadja encounters Schezo Wegey, and also Satan (Dark Prince outside of Japan), and in the end Carbuncle joins Arle Nadja.

== Gameplay ==
Gameplay combines role-playing elements with some unique twists. For example, there are no numeric stats; instead, everything is represented by character facial expressions and sprites. Another is the complete lack of physical attacks. Everything utilizes one of four magical elements: Fire, Ice Storm, Thunder, and Bayoen. Some enemies are weaker against one particular magic attack than another.

== Games in the series ==
Game	Details
Madō Monogatari 1-2-3 Original release date(s): JP: June 15, 1990 (MSX2); JP: November 23, 1991 (PC-9801); WW: June 26, 2025 (Nintendo Switch)	Release years by system: 1990 – MSX2; 1991 – PC-9801; 2025 – Nintendo Switch
Madō Monogatari 1-2-3 Original release date(s): JP: June 15, 1990 (MSX2); JP: November 23, 1991 (PC-9801); WW: June 26, 2025 (Nintendo Switch)	Notes: The MSX2 version was re-released by D4 Enterprise under its EGG Console label for Nintendo Switch in 2025. Despite releasing worldwide, the game remained playable in Japanese only.
Madō Monogatari A-R-S Original release date(s): JP: December 10, 1993	Release years by system: 1993 – PC-9801
Madō Monogatari: Hanamaru Daiyōchienji Original release date(s): JP: January 12, 1996	Release years by system: 1996 – Super Famicom
Madō Monogatari: Hanamaru Daiyōchienji Original release date(s): JP: January 12, 1996	Notes: Japanese: (はなまる大幼稚園児, Kids of Hanamaru Big Kindergarten), another episode of Madō Monogatari I.; Released on Project EGG in March 2024 as Madō Monogatari Hanamaru dai youchienji, despite no in-game English translation available.
Madō Monogatari Original release date(s): JP: July 23, 1998	Release years by system: 1998 – Sega Saturn
Madō Monogatari Original release date(s): JP: 2005	Release years by system: 2005 – i-mode
Madō Monogatari Original release date(s): JP: 2005	Notes: Developed and published by D4 Enterprise.
Sorcery Saga: Curse of the Great Curry God Original release dates: JP: March 28, 2013; NA: December 10, 2013; EU: February 21, 2014	Release years by system: 2013 – PlayStation Vita; 2018 – Windows
Sorcery Saga: Curse of the Great Curry God Original release dates: JP: March 28, 2013; NA: December 10, 2013; EU: February 21, 2014	Notes: Known in Japan as Sei Madou Monogatari (聖魔導物語, Sei Madō Monogatari, Story of Holy Sorcery).; Developed and published by Compile Heart in cooperation with D4 Enterprise and ZeroDiv.; First game in the series to receive an English-language release.
Mado Monogatari: Fia and the Wondrous Academy Original release date(s): JP: November 28, 2024; WW: July 29, 2025	Release years by system: 2024 – Nintendo Switch, PlayStation 4, PlayStation 5; 2026 – Windows
Mado Monogatari: Fia and the Wondrous Academy Original release date(s): JP: November 28, 2024; WW: July 29, 2025	Notes: Developed by Sting Entertainment and published by Compile Heart in cooperation with D4 Enterprise and Sega. Published in the West by Idea Factory International.

=== Remakes ===
Game	Details
Madō Monogatari I: Mittsu no Madō-kyū Original release date(s): JP: December 3, 1993	Release years by system: 1993 – Game Gear
Madō Monogatari I: Mittsu no Madō-kyū Original release date(s): JP: December 3, 1993	Notes: Japanese: (3つの魔導球, The Three Magic Spheres), remake of the first part of 1-2-3; Published by Sega.; Released on Project EGG in November 2023 as Madō Monogatari I The Three Magic Spheres, despite no in-game English translation available.
Madō Monogatari II: Arle 16-Sai Original release date(s): JP: May 20, 1994	Release years by system: 1994 – Game Gear
Madō Monogatari II: Arle 16-Sai Original release date(s): JP: May 20, 1994	Notes: Japanese: (アルル16才, 16-year-old Arle), remake of the second part of 1-2-3.; Published by Sega.; Released on Project EGG in December 2023 as Madō Monogatari II 16-year-old Arle, despite no in-game English translation available.
Madō Monogatari III: Kyūkyoku Joō-sama Original release date(s): JP: November 25, 1994	Release years by system: 1994 – Game Gear
Madō Monogatari III: Kyūkyoku Joō-sama Original release date(s): JP: November 25, 1994	Notes: Japanese: (究極女王様, The Ultimate Queen), remake of the third part of 1-2-3; Published by Sega.; Released on Project EGG in January 2024 as Madō Monogatari III The Ultimate Queen, despite no in-game English translation available.
Madō Monogatari A: Dokidoki Vacation Original release date(s): JP: November 24, 1995	Release years by system: 1995 – Game Gear
Madō Monogatari A: Dokidoki Vacation Original release date(s): JP: November 24, 1995	Notes: Japanese: (ドキドキばけ～しょん, Excited Vacation), remake of the first part of A-R-S.; Released on Project EGG in February 2024 as Madō Monogatari A, despite no in-game English translation available.
Madō Monogatari I Original release date(s): JP: March 22, 1996	Release years by system: 1996 – Mega Drive
Madō Monogatari I Original release date(s): JP: March 22, 1996	Notes: Remake of the first part of 1-2-3.; Released on Project EGG in January 2024 as Madō Monogatari I, despite no in-game English translation available.
Madō Monogatari: Honō no Sotsuenji Original release date(s): JP: December 13, 1996	Release years by system: 1996 – PC Engine CD-ROM²
Madō Monogatari: Honō no Sotsuenji Original release date(s): JP: December 13, 1996	Notes: Japanese: (炎の卒園児, Graduate Child of Flame), remake of the first part of 1-2-3 published by NEC Avenue.

=== Disc Station ===
Game	Details
Madō Monogatari Episode II: Carbuncle Original release date(s): JP: December 10, 1989	Release years by system: 1989 – MSX
Madō Monogatari Episode II: Carbuncle Original release date(s): JP: December 10, 1989	Notes: Found in Disc Station Special: Christmas Edition; prototype of the second part of 1-2-3.
Madō Monogatari: Michikusa Ibun Original release date(s): JP: July 15, 1994	Release years by system: 1994 – PC-9801
Madō Monogatari: Michikusa Ibun Original release date(s): JP: July 15, 1994	Notes: Japanese: (道草異聞, lit. 'Loitering around and the rumor'); found in Disc Station Vol. 3.
Madō Monogatari: Hachamecha Kimatsu Shiken Original release date(s): JP: September 6, 1996	Release years by system: 1996 – Windows
Madō Monogatari: Hachamecha Kimatsu Shiken Original release date(s): JP: September 6, 1996	Notes: Japanese: (はちゃめちゃ期末試験, lit. 'Confused final exam'); found in Disc Station Vol. 12.
Madō Monogatari: Madōshi no Tō Original release date(s): JP: September 6, 1997	Release years by system: 1997 – Windows
Madō Monogatari: Madōshi no Tō Original release date(s): JP: September 6, 1997	Notes: Japanese: (魔導師の塔, lit. 'Magician's Tower'); found in Disc Station Vol. 16.
Mado Jeongi: Elysion e Bimil Original release date(s): KO: 1997	Release years by system: 1997 – Windows
Mado Jeongi: Elysion e Bimil Original release date(s): KO: 1997	Notes: Korean: (엘리시온의 비밀, lit. 'Secret of Elysion'); found in the Korean version of Disc Station Vol. 5.
