= Kumiko Watanabe =

Japanese voice actress (born 1965)

- 渡辺 久美子
- Born: October 7, 1965 (age 61); Chiba Prefecture, Japan
- Other names: Nabekumi (ナベクミ); Kumin (くーみん); Kumio (久美男); Coo (クー)
- Occupation: Voice actress
- Years active: 1984–present
- Agent: Sigma Seven
- Notable work: Klonoa as Klonoa; Digimon Frontier as Tomoki Himi; Inuyasha as Shippō; Sgt. Frog as Sergeant Keroro; Tales of Vesperia as Karoi
- Spouse: Kōji Tsujitani (m. 2012; died 2018)

Kumiko Watanabe (渡辺 久美子, Watanabe Kumiko; born October 7, 1965) is a Japanese voice actress.

Her most notable voice roles include the eponymous protagonist of the Klonoa franchise, the titular character of the Sgt. Frog franchise, Shippō in InuYasha, Mother in the Atashin'chi series, and Regina in DokiDoki! PreCure. She was married to Kōji Tsujitani.

== Biography ==
Watanabe was born on October 7, 1965, in Chiba Prefecture, Japan.

Her awareness of becoming a voice actress was sparked by applying for the voice acting contest of the Space Warrior Baldios theatrical version. Although she was not chosen, making it into the final 30 for the studio audition out of the large number of applicants gave her the confidence to think, "Maybe I'm suited for voice acting work".

After attending the Japan Narration Actor Institute, she joined Arts Vision.

At a point she thought she might not be suited to be a voice actress, deciding, "I'll pay and study here for about a year, and the moment I realize the agency has no intention of promoting me or that I lack the real ability, I'll quit." However, back then Arts Vision had no young actors who could voice young boy roles, so she kept getting called for auditions, leading to her first regular role as Jun Yamano in Ronin Warriors, and her first starring role as Kouta Hoshikawa in Brave Exkaiser.

On July 20, 2012, Watanabe announced on her personal blog that she had married voice actor Kōji Tsujitani.

She officially transferred from Arts Vision to Sigma Seven on February 1, 2018. Later that same year on October 17, her husband Tsujitani suddenly died of a stroke at the age of 57.

In 2023, she officially took over the role of Hanako Hanazawa in the Sazae-san television anime series from Keiko Yamamoto.

== Filmography ==
=== Animation ===
List of voice performances in animation
Year	Title	Role	Notes	Source
1986	Uchūsen Sagittarius	Lib	Debut role	
1986	Gundam ZZ	Beat		
1988	Sonic Soldier Borgman	Jun Momoki (Tooru)		
1988	Ronin Warriors	Jun Yamano		
1989	Momotaro Densetsu	Kintarou		
1990	Brave Exkaiser	Kouta Hoshikawa		
1990–1991	The Hakkenden	Kurayago	OVA	
1991	The Heroic Legend of Arslan	Alfreed	OVA	
1991–1992	Magical Princess Minky Momo Hold on to Your Dreams	Fairy 2		
1991	Genji Tsūshin Agedama	Wapuro		
1991	Condition Green	Barney Page	OVA	
1991	Oh! My Konbu ja:OH!MYコンブ	Musubi		
1992	Tekkaman Blade	Jody		
1992	Ashita e Free Kick ja:あしたへフリーキック			
1992	Jeanie with the Light Brown Hair	Helen		
1992	Babel II	LaShelle	OVA	
1992–1993	Ys II: Castle in the Heavens	Tarf Hadal		
1993	Mobile Suit Victory Gundam	Katejina Loos		
1993	Nintama Rantarō	Minamoto Kingo		
1993	Muka Muka Paradise	Uiba Shikatani		
1994	Tekkaman Blade II	Anita	OVA	
1994	Sins of the Sisters	Kozue Takemiya	Eps. 3-4	
1995	Crayon Shin Chan	Kenji	Ep. from January 6, 1995	
1995	Sailor Moon SuperS	JunJun		
1995	Soar High! Isami	Onna Karasu Tengu		
1995	Bonobono	Bonobono		
1995	Sailor Moon SuperS	Kigurumiko	Ep. 133	
1995	Megami Paradise	Rouge		
1995	Saint Tail	Kenta	Ep. 19	
1996	Bakusō Kyōdai Let's & Go!!	J		
1996	Case Closed	Yuuta Ogawa	Ep. 7	
1996	Ijiwaru Baasan ja:いじわるばあさん	Tsutomu		
1997	Revolutionary Girl Utena	Shadow Girl C-ko		
1998	Bakusou Kyoudai Let's & Go!! Max	Goki Ichimonji (Gou)		
1998	Anime Shūkan DX! Mi-Pha-Pu	Pu-chan		
1998	Brain Powerd	Quincy Issā/Iiko Isami		
1999	Corrector Yui	Eco		
1999	Turn A Gundam	Fran Doll		
1999	Zoids: Chaotic Century	Moonbay		
1999	Gundress	Kei Yung		
2000	Hamtaro	Moguru-kun		
2000	Inuyasha	Shippō		
2001	Gyōten Ningen Batseelor	Tsuchiwarashi		
2001	Hikaru no Go	Hideki Isobe		
2002	MegaMan NT Warrior series	Tōru Hikawa		
2002	Digimon Frontier	Tomoki Himi		
2002–2009	Atashin'chi	Mother		
2003	Beyblade G-Revolution	Julia		
2003	Zatch Bell!	Sauza		
2003	Rumiko Takahashi Anthology	Ritsuko Hirooka	Ep. 10	
2003	Planetes	Claire Rondo		
2004–2011	Sgt. Frog	Sergeant Keroro		
2004	Doki Doki School Hours	Linda Matsumoto		
2004	Samurai 7	Honoka		
2004	Ojamajo Doremi Naisho	Fami Harukaze	OVA	
2004	Gankutsuou: The Count of Monte Cristo	Héloïse de Villefort		
2005	Gun Sword	Catharine		
2005	Oku-sama wa Mahō Shōjo: Bewitched Agnes	Miki Sakano		
2006	One Piece	Fukurou		
2006	Silk Road Kids ja:シルクロード少年 ユート	Bani		
2006	Demashita! Powerpuff Girls Z	Rod	Ep. 23	
2007–2009	Yes! Pretty Cure 5	Yu Natsuki	Also GoGo	
2007	You're Under Arrest: Full Throttle	Randi Toranosuke Hamondo		
2009	Shangri-La	Klaris Lutz		
2010–present	Working!! series	Kyōko Shirafuji		
2011	Digimon Fusion	Gumdramon, Chackmon	Season 3	
2011	Un-Go	Fumihiko Sasa		
2013	Tamako Market	Fumiko Mitsumura		
2013–2014	Dokidoki! Precure	Regina		
2014	Inari, Konkon, Koi Iroha	Sanjou Keiko		
2014	Keroro	Sergeant Keroro		
2015	Shin Atashin'chi	Mother		
2017	Duel Masters	Kabamaro		
2019	Midnight Occult Civil Servants	Dream Demon	Eps 9-10	
2020	Shachibato! President, It's Time for Battle!	Ruck	Eps 1, 3, 8	
2021	Higurashi When They Cry – GO	Teacher	Eps 19-20	
2022	Cue!	Setsuko Takasaka		
2023–present	Sazae-san	Hanako Hanazawa	Third voice	
2025	Butt Detective	Kaitou Q	Eps 129-130	

=== Theatrical animation ===
List of voice performances in theatrical animation
Year	Title	Role	Notes	Source
1990	Ronin Warriors: Legend of the Inferno Armor	Jun Yamano		
1993	Crayon Shin-chan: Action Mask vs. Leotard Devil	Rope Lady B		
1996	Hello Kitty: Everyone Protect the Forest!	Ant-san		
1996	Nintama Rantarō the Movie	Minamoto Kingo		
1996	The Day the Angel Flew	Yū		
1997	Let's & Go!! WGP: The Chase of the Uncontrollable Mini 4WD!	J		
1999	Gundress: The Movie	Yung Kay		
1999	Adolescence of Utena	Shadow Girl C-Ko		
2001	Inuyasha the Movie: Affections Touching Across Time	Shippō		
2002	Turn A Gundam: Earth Light	Fran Doll		
2002	Turn A Gundam: Moonlight Butterfly	Fran Doll		
2002	Digimon Frontier: Island of Lost Digimon	Tomoki Himi	Short film	
2002	Inuyasha the Movie: The Castle Beyond the Looking Glass	Shippō		
2003	Atashin'chi the Movie	Mother		
2003	Inuyasha the Movie: Swords of an Honorable Ruler	Shippō		
2004	Inuyasha the Movie: Fire on the Mystic Island	Shippō		
2005	Rockman EXE the Movie: Programs of Light and Darkness	Tōru Hikawa		
2006	Majime ni Fumajime Kaiketsu Zorori: Nazo no Otakara Daisakusen	Sergeant Keroro		
2006	Keroro Gunso the Super Movie	Sergeant Keroro		
2007	Keroro Gunso the Super Movie 2: The Deep Sea Princess	Sergeant Keroro		
2008	Keroro Gunso the Super Movie 3: Keroro vs. Keroro Great Sky Duel	Sergeant Keroro, Dark Keroro		
2008	Mushakero Unveiled! Sengoku Star Big Battle!!	Sergeant Keroro	Short film	
2009	Keroro Gunso the Super Movie 4: Gekishin Dragon Warriors	Sergeant Keroro		
2009	Kero 0: Depart! Assembly of Everyone!!	Sergeant Keroro	Short film	
2010	Keroro Gunso the Super Movie 5: Creation! Ultimate Keroro, Wonder Space-Time Island	Sergeant Keroro		
2010	Atashin'chi: The 3D Movie: Passionate Superpowers♪ Mother Goes Wild!	Mother		
2010	Inazuma Eleven: Saikyō Gundan Ōga Shūrai	Mistrene "Mistore" Callous		
2012	One Piece Film: Z	Gali		
2014	Tamako Love Story	Fumiko Mitsumura		
2017	Sound! Euphonium: The Movie – May the Melody Reach You!	Akemi Tanaka		
2019	Crayon Shin-chan: Honeymoon Hurricane ~The Lost Hiroshi~	Kaō Kosugi		
2022	One Piece Film: Red	Mini Bruno		
2025	Butt Detective the Movie: Star and Moon	Additional voice		
2026	New Theatrical Movie Keroro Gunsō: Upon Revival, Immediately Facing the Threat of Earth's Destruction!	Sergeant Keroro		
2026	The Apothecary Diaries: The Late Lady's Treasure	Qiuyu		

=== Video games ===
List of voice performances in video games
Year	Title	Role	Notes	Source
1993	Battle Tycoon: Flash Hiders SFX	Calnarsa Lue Bonn		
1994	Star Breaker	Isshu, Leina	PC Engine	
1994	Advanced V.G.	Reimi Jahana	PC Engine	
1994	Megami Tengoku: Megami Paradise	Rouge	PC Engine	
1994	Lunar: Eternal Blue	Mauri	MegaCD	
1995	Battle Tycoon	Calnarsa LeBon	Super Famicom	
1995	Mahjong Sword	Lepias	PC Engine	
1996	Advanced V.G.	Reimi Jahana	PlayStation	
1996	Megami Paradise II	Rouge	PC FX	
1996	Alice in Cyberland	Nikaido Yoko	PlayStation	
1997	Dragon Knight 4	Rhynus, Sayla	PlayStation	
1997	Marica: Shinjitsu no Sekai	Toudou Kaname	Sega Saturn	
1997	Klonoa: Door to Phantomile	Klonoa	PlayStation	
1998	Bakusō Kyōdai Let's & Go!!: Eternal Wings	Gouki	PlayStation	
1998	Lunar 2: Eternal Blue Complete	Mauri	Sega Saturn, remake of Lunar: Eternal Blue	
1998	Advanced V.G. 2	Reimi Jahana	PlayStation	
1999	Klonoa: Moonlight Museum	Klonoa	WonderSwan	
1999	Ace Combat 3	Fiona Chris Fitzgerald	PlayStation	
2001	Klonoa 2: Lunatea's Veil	Klonoa	PlayStation 2	
2001	Klonoa: Empire of Dreams	Klonoa	Game Boy Advance	
2001	Inuyasha	Shippō	PlayStation	
2002	Alpine Racer 3	Klonoa	PlayStation 2	
2002	Klonoa Beach Volleyball	Klonoa	PlayStation	
2002	Klonoa 2: Dream Champ Tournament	Klonoa	Game Boy Advance	
2002	Klonoa Heroes: Densetsu no Star Medal	Klonoa	Game Boy Advance	
2005	Namco × Capcom	Klonoa, Amazona	PlayStation 2	
2006	Final Fantasy Fables: Chocobo Tales	Mowgli		
2007	Final Fantasy Fables: Chocobo's Dungeon	Mowgli		
2008	Tales of Vesperia	Karol Capel	PS3, XB360	-
2008	Klonoa	Klonoa	Wii remake of Klonoa: Door to Phantomile	
2008	Chocobo to Mahō no Ehon: Majō to Shōjo to Gonin no Yūsha	Mowgli		
2017	Tales of the Rays	Karol Capel, Sergeant Keroro		
2017	The Legend of Zelda: Breath of the Wild	Yunobo		
2021	Digimon New Century	Penmon, Chackmon, Blizzarmon, Daipenmon	Android	
2022	Klonoa Phantasy Reverie Series	Klonoa	Remakes of Klonoa: Door to Phantomile and Klonoa 2: Lunatea's Veil	

=== Audio dramas ===
List of voice performances in audio dramas
Title	Role	Notes	Source
Chivas 1-2-3	Hop		
Doki Doki School Hours	Linda Matsumoto		
Hanasaki Komachi Girls	Sakurako Natsukawa		
Little Princess: Marl Ōkoku no Ningyō Hime 2	Gao, Tea		
Little Princess: Marl Ōkoku no Ningyō Hime 2: Another Diary			
Megami Paradise	Rouge		
Pathway for Santa Claus -Santa ga kureta okurimono-			
s-CRY-ed	Ryuko Saekki		
Silent Mobius: Silent Lovers	Minazuki Saya		
Wrestle Angels	Bomber Kijima		

=== Dubbing roles ===
List of dub performances in overseas productions
Title	Role	Notes	Source
Die Hard with a Vengeance	Raymond	1999 TV Asahi edition	
Pororo the Little Penguin	Pororo		
Racing Stripes	Stripes children		
The Simpsons			
Woody Woodpecker	Woody		

=== Tokusatsu ===
List of voice performances in tokusatsu
Year	Title	Role	Notes	Source
2014	Ressha Sentai ToQger	Mikey	Also in ToQger vs. Kyoryuger	
2026	Super Space Sheriff Gavan Infinity	Patran's Mother		
