= Tomoko Kawakami =

Japanese voice actress (1970–2011)

- 川上 とも子
- Born: April 25, 1970; Tokyo, Japan
- Died: June 9, 2011 (aged 41); Tokyo, Japan
- Other names: Tomozou; Cecilia
- Occupation: Voice actress
- Years active: 1994–2010
- Employer: Production Baobab
- Notable work: Revolutionary Girl Utena as Utena Tenjou; Air as Misuzu Kamio; Bleach as Soifon; Chrono Crusade as Rosette Christopher; Fushigi Yugi as Chiriko; Hikaru no Go as Hikaru Shindo; Sgt. Frog as Fuyuki Hinata; Ape Escape as Natsumi; Kenichi: The Mightiest Disciple as Miu Fūrinji

Tomoko Kawakami (川上 とも子, Kawakami Tomoko; April 25, 1970 – June 9, 2011) was a Japanese voice actress. She was also known by her pen-name Tomozou (とも蔵), and her Christian name Cecilia (セシリア, Seshiria). Having graduated from the Toho Gakuen College of Drama and Music, she was a member of Production Baobab.

== Career ==
Kawakami debuted in 1994 as a role of a boy in Metal Fighter Miku. Her first regular performance was in 1995 as Chiriko in Fushigi Yuugi. Two years after, she landed her first starring voice role as Utena Tenjou in Revolutionary Girl Utena. Aside from Chiriko and Utena, her famous roles are in Air (Misuzu Kamio), Bleach (Soifon), Chrono Crusade (Rosette Christopher), Hikaru no Go (Hikaru Shindo), Sgt. Frog (Fuyuki Hinata), Ape Escape (Natsumi), Yukiko Kawasaki (Dear Boys), Sugar (A Little Snow Fairy Sugar), Aria (Athena Glory), and Miu Fūrinji (Kenichi: The Mightiest Disciple).

Kawakami provided voices for young boys, girls and comical characters. The best-known genre of her roles are tomboyish characters (Soifon, Utena Tenjou). With such a powerful voice, she was often affiliated in paranormal and yuri-themed anime. She also made her name voicing the heroine in the Harukanaru Toki no Naka de series, based from the Neoromance game with the same title produced by Koei in 2000.

=== Illness and death ===
In August 2008, Kawakami was diagnosed with ovarian cancer, which required surgery. During her battle with cancer over the next three years, replacement voice actresses stepped into most of her ongoing roles, although Kawakami managed to do some voice work until her retirement in early 2010. She died on June 9, 2011. Her death was met with an outpouring of grief. Kumiko Watanabe, a fellow voice actress and particularly close friend of hers who worked alongside Kawakami in series such as Klonoa and Sgt. Frog, responded on her web diary with condolences just two days after Kawakami's death. Her mother Shizuko thanked all her fans for their condolences in an online letter on 29 June 2011.

== Filmography ==
=== Anime series ===
- Air - Misuzu Kamio
- Amaenaideyo!! - Sumi Ikuina
- A Little Snow Fairy Sugar - Sugar
- Angelic Layer - Madoka Fujisaki
- Aria - Athena Glory
- Ashita no Nadja - Stefan (in episode 31)
- Battle Athletes Victory - Chris Christopher
- Best Student Council - Cyndi Manabe
- Betterman - Sēme
- Bleach - Soifon (Episode 24 - 205)
- Cardcaptor Sakura - Rika Sasaki
- Chrono Crusade - Rosette Christopher
- Clannad - Girl from the Illusionary World
- Crush Gear Turbo - Yamano Kimomo
- Cyborg 009 - Cynthia
- Darker than BLACK - Amber
- Dear Boys - Yukiko Kawasaki
- Descendants of Darkness - Kazusa Otonashi
- Detective School Q - Kazuma Narusawa
- Di Gi Charat Nyo! - Chibi Akari, Kareida-san
- Doki Doki School Hours - Akane Kobayashi
- Elfen Lied - Mariko
- Emily of New Moon - Emily Byrd Starr
- F-Zero GP Legend - Sasuke Reina
- Fullmetal Alchemist - Kyle (in episode 9)
- Fushigi Yûgi, Fushigi Yūgi Oni, and Fushigi Yūgi Eikoden - Chiriko
- Gakuen Heaven - Satoshi Umino
- Gaiking - Lulu
- Gakko no Kaidan - Satsuki Miyanoshita
- Genesis of Aquarion - Futaba
- Great Teacher Onizuka - Hoshino (in episode 28)
- Godannar - Luna
- Harukanaru Toki no Naka de - Akane Motomiya
- Hikaru no Go - Hikaru Shindō
- I'm Gonna Be An Angel! - Noelle
- Jigoku Shōjo - Yoshimi Kuroda (in episode 1)
- Jibaku-kun - Pink
- Jinki: Extend - Elnie Tachibana
- Kanon - Sayuri Kurata
- Kara no Kyōkai - Ryougi Shiki (Drama CD)
- Magical Project S - Konoha Haida/Funky Connie
- Kenichi: The Mightiest Disciple - Miu Fūrinji
- Martian Successor Nadesico - Eri, Ai
- MegaMan NT Warrior - Princess Pride
- Mirmo! - Wakaba
- Mon Colle Knights - Fearī
- NieA 7 - Kāna
- Nodame Cantabile - Elise (main story in anime), Puririn (Purigorota)
- One Piece - Amanda
- Orphen: Revenge - Licorice Nelson
- Paranoia Agent - "Otokomichi/A Man's Path" manga heroine (Episode 4)
- Piano: The Melody of a Young Girl's Heart - Yūki Matsubara
- Pocket Monsters - Ayame, Takami, Hikari's Mimirol, Pokédex (Sinnoh region)
- Popotan - Mai/Konami
- Power Stone - Ayame
- Rune Soldier - Merrill
- Revolutionary Girl Utena - Utena Tenjō
- Saiyuki Reload series - Lirin
- Saru Get You -On Air- - Natsumi
- Sgt. Frog - Fuyuki Hinata (Episode 1 + 231)
- Shaman King - Pirika, Mini Mongomeri
- Space Pirate Mito - Mito Mitsukuni
- Steel Angel Kurumi - Eiko Kichijōji
- Tactics - Yōko
- The Law of Ueki - Ai Mori
- The Twelve Kingdoms - Rangyoku
- The World of Narue - Ran Tendō
- Those Who Hunt Elves - Annette, Emily
- Those Who Hunt Elves 2 - Annette, Pichi
- Tokyo Mew Mew - Ayano Uemura (in episode 34)
- Touch: Miss Lonely Yesterday - Kōchi
- Trinity Blood - Elise Wasmeyer (in episode 2)
- Uta Kata - Satsuki Takigawa
- VS Knight Ramune & 40 Fire - Trumpet
- Yakitate!! Japan - Princess Anne (episode 31)

=== Anime films ===
- The Doraemons: The Great Operation of Springing Insects (1998) - Momo
- Revolutionary Girl Utena: The Adolescence of Utena (1999) - Utena Tenjō
- Inuyasha the Movie: Affections Touching Across Time (2001) - Hari
- Lupin III: Alcatraz Connection (2001) - Monica
- Air (2005) - Misuzu Kamio
- Bleach: Memories of Nobody (2006) - Soifon
- Keroro Gunso the Super Movie (2006) - Fuyuki Hinata
- Bleach: The DiamondDust Rebellion (2007) - Soifon
- Keroro Gunso the Super Movie 2: The Deep Sea Princess (2007) - Fuyuki Hinata
- Keroro Gunso the Super Movie 3: Keroro vs. Keroro Great Sky Duel (2008) - Fuyuki Hinata

=== Video games ===
- Air - Misuzu Kamio
- Ape Escape - Natsumi, Charu
- Bleach: Blade Battlers 2 - Soifon
- Bleach: Heat The Soul 3 - Soifon
- Bleach: Heat the Soul 4 - Soifon
- Bleach: Shattered Blade - Soifon
- Bomberman Generation - Bomberman
- Brave Story: New Traveler - Yuno
- Growlanser II: The Sense of Justice - Charlone Claudius
- Klonoa 2: Lunatea's Veil - Lolo
- Klonoa Beach Volleyball - Lolo
- Klonoa Phantasy Reverie Series - Lolo
- Magical Drop F - Judgment
- Never 7: The End of Infinity - Yuka Kawashima
- Radiant Silvergun - Reana
- Ratchet & Clank: Up Your Arsenal - Sasha (Japanese dub)
- SD Gundam G Generation - Rachel Ransom
- Sengoku Basara - Itsuki
- Shoujo Kakumei Utena: Itsuka Kakumei Sareru Monogatari - Utena Tenjō
- Skies of Arcadia - Aika
- Sonic Wings Assault - Mao Mao
- Super Smash Bros. Brawl - Fushigisou (Ivysaur)
- Tales of Destiny 2 - Nanaly Fletch
- The King of Fighters 2001 - May Lee
- The King of Fighters 2002 - May Lee
- The Law of Ueki: Taosu ze Roberuto Juudan! - Ai Mori
- The Legend of Dragoon - Meru
- Thousand Arms - Sodina Dawnfried
- Tokimeki Memorial: Girl's Side (Konami Palace Selection) - Fujii Natsumi
- Tokimeki Memorial Girl's Side 1st Love - Fujii Natsumi
- Tokimeki Memorial Girl's Side: 1st Love Plus - Fujii Natsumi
- Viper F40 - Raika Grace
- Viper CTR - Miki

=== Dubbing roles ===
- Blue Crush – Anne Marie Chadwick (Kate Bosworth)
- Gumby – Goo (Gloria Clokey)
- Hearts in Atlantis – Carol Gerber (Mika Boorem)
- Heat – Lauren Gustafson (Natalie Portman)
- Jumanji – Judy Shepherd (Kirsten Dunst)
- The Secret World of Alex Mack - Alex Mack (Larisa Oleynik)

=== Original video animation ===
- Amon: The Apocalypse of Devilman -Yumi
- Tokio Private Police -Noriko Ibuki

=== Successors ===
- Houko Kuwashima - Sgt. Frog as Fuyuki Hinata, Bleach as Soifon
- Sayuri Yahagi - Nodame Cantabile as Puririn - Season 2 (Kawakami returned in Season 3)
- Kumi Sakuma - Nodame Cantabile as Elise - Season 2 (Kawakami returned in Season 3)
- Yuki Kaida - A Foreign Love Affair as Kaoru Omi
- Satsuki Yukino - Pokémon Diamond and Pearl as Dawn's Buneary (Hikari's Mimirol), Pokedex, Momoan, additional characters
- Shiho Kawaragi - Desperate Housewives as Kayla Huntington - Season 4
- Akiko Kimura - Battle Spirits as Mama
- Yumi Kakazu - Tales of VS, Tales of the World: Radiant Mythology 3 as Nanaly Fletch
- Omi Minami - Elemental Gerard as Ashea
- Yuki Matsuoka - Heroes Fantasia as Mileru
- Saki Fujita - Cardcaptor Sakura: Clear Card as Rika Sasaki
- Rie Kugimiya - Kenichi: The Mightiest Disciple as Miu
- Miyuki Sawashiro - Sengoku Basara as Itsuki
- Ai Nonaka - Anpanman as Candle-Man
- Yuka Imai - Demonbane PS2 game, Super Robot Wars UX as Claudius
- Aimi Tanaka - The King of Fighters All Star as May Lee Jinju
- Rina Hidaka - Shaman King 2021 as Pirika Usui
- Rina Sato - Aria the Crepuscolo as Athena Glory
- Inuko Inuyama - Super Smash Bros. Ultimate as Ivysaur

== Sources ==
- Nakagami, Yoshikatsu. "The Official Art of AIR" (October 2007), Newtype USA. pgs. 135–41
