= Satomi Kōrogi =

Japanese actress, voice actress, & singer (born 1962)

- こおろぎ さとみ
- Born: Satomi Kōrogi (興梠 さとみ); November 14, 1962 (age 64); Mitaka, Tokyo, Japan
- Other name: Mii-chan (みぃちゃん)
- Occupations: Actress; voice actress; singer; narrator; disc jockey
- Years active: 1988–present
- Employer: Production Baobab
- Notable work: Crayon Shin-chan as Himawari Nohara; Mama wa Shōgaku 4 Nensei as Natsumi Mizuki; Chi's Sweet Home as Chi; Dragon Ball Super as Omni King; Guilty Gear as May; Pokémon as Togepi and Pichu; Shonen Ashibe as Goma-chan; Excel Saga as Menchi
- Spouse: Shigeru Nakahara (divorced)
- Children: 1
- Website: Official profile

Satomi Kōrogi (こおろぎ さとみ, Kōrogi Satomi; born November 14, 1962) is a Japanese actress, voice actress, singer, narrator, and disc jockey from Tokyo. Her birth name is Satomi Kōrogi (興梠 さとみ) and she is affiliated with Production Baobab.

She is best known for her roles as the titular character in Chi's Sweet Home, Himawari Nohara in Crayon Shin-chan, Misty's Togepi and Togetic in both the Japanese and English versions of Pokémon, Goma-chan in Shonen Ashibe and May from Guilty Gear.

In addition to Togepi, Kōrogi also voiced Ritchie's Pikachu nicknamed "Sparky" in the first season of Pokémon. She also voiced Casey's Chikorita, Bayleef and Meganium during the Johto series.

She is also bilingual; her first language being Japanese and her second language being English.

== Filmography ==
=== Television animation ===
- Blood Blockade Battlefront (Aligura)
- Chi's Sweet Home (Chi)
- Clannad After Story (Ushio Okazaki)
- Comic Party (Asahi Sakurai)
- Crayon Shin-chan (Himawari Nohara, Megumi Yamura)
- Dragon Ball Super (Omni-King)
- Excel Saga (Menchi, Sandora, Puchū, Ropponmatsu 2, Kumi Kumi, others)
- Fairy Tail (Frosch)
- Floral Magician Mary Bell (Yūri)
- Fresh Pretty Cure! (Chiffon)
- Fullmetal Alchemist (Nina Tucker)
- Fushigiboshi no Futagohime (Poomo)
- Gasaraki (Misuzu Gowa)
- Go! Princess PreCure (Tina)
- Jeanie with the Light Brown Hair (Jimmy)
- Jigoku Shōjo (Inko)
- Zatch Bell! (Ponygon)
- Kore wa Zombie Desu ka? (Delusion Eucliwood)
- Kyatto Ninden Teyandee (Otama)
- Love Hina (Mecha-Tama-chan)
- Magic Knight Rayearth (Sanyun)
- Mahōjin Guru Guru (Migu)
- Mama wa Shōgaku 4 Nensei (Natsumi Mizuki)
- Miracle Giants Dome-kun (Kaori)
- Mobile Suit Victory Gundam (Suzy Relane, Karlmann Doukatous, Connie Francis)
- Nichijou (Cider at episode 12)
- Ojarumaru (Ai Tamura, Kame Kameda, Tome Kameda, Enma Wife, others)
- Planetes (Nono)
- Please Teacher! (Maho Kazami)
- Pokémon (Togepi, Pichu, Mew, others)
- Pop Team Epic (Popuko (Episode 7 A-part)
- Raimuiro Senkitan (Kuki)
- Revolutionary Girl Utena (Chu-Chu, Shadow Girl B)
- Rurouni Kenshin (Sakura)
- Saint Tail (Ruby)
- Scrapped Princess (Natalie)
- Shukufuku no Campanella (Tango)
- Steam Detectives (Marian)
- Shōnen Ashibe (Goma-chan)
- Tamagotchi! (Hapihapitchi, Doremitchi)
- Turn A Gundam (Lulu)
- Yuri's World (Cat)

=== Theatrical animation ===
- Pocket Monsters the Movie – Mewtwo Strikes Back (1998) (Kasumi's Togepi)
- Pocket Monsters the Movie - Mirage Pokémon: Lugia's Explosive Birth (1999) (Kasumi's Togepi)
- Pocket Monsters the Movie - Emperor of the Crystal Tower (2000) (Kasumi's Togepi)
- Pocket Monsters the Movie - Celebi: Encounter Beyond Time (2001) (Kasumi's Togepi)
- Pocket Monsters the Movie - Guardian Gods of the City of Water (2002) (Kasumi's Togepi)
- Pocket Monsters Advanced Generation the Movie - Mew and the Wave Hero: Lucario (2005) (Mew)
- Pocket Monsters the Movie – Mewtwo Strikes Back: EVOLUTION (2019) (Kasumi's Togepi)
- Paprika (2006) (Japanese doll)
- Tamagotchi: Happiest Story in the Universe! (2008) (Hapihapitchi)

=== OVA ===
- RG Veda (Aizenmyo)
- Mega Man: Upon a Star (Roll)

=== Video games ===
- Crash Bandicoot series (Polar, Nina Cortex (Twinsanity))
- Cookie's Bustle
- Dragon Ball Xenoverse 2 (Zeno)
- Fate Grand Order (Aurora)
- Guilty Gear series (May)
- Klonoa 2: Lunatea's Veil (Tat)
- Klonoa Beach Volleyball (Tat)
- Klonoa Phantasy Reverie Series (Tat)
- Kyatto Ninden Teyandee (Otama)
- Konjiki no Gash Bell series (Umagon)
- Legaia 2: Duel Saga (Marianne)
- The Legendary Starfy (Starfy, Mermaid)
- Magic Knight Rayearth (Sera)
- Monster Hunter Tri (Cha-cha)
- Phantom of Inferno (Cal Devens/ Drei)
- Puyo Puyo~n (Harpy)
- Ratchet & Clank: Size Matters (Luna)
- Silhouette Mirage (Dynamis06)
- Super Smash Bros. Melee (Pichu, Togepi)
- Super Smash Bros. Brawl (Togepi)
- Super Smash Bros. for Nintendo 3DS and Wii U (Togepi)
- Super Smash Bros. Ultimate (Pichu, Togepi)
- Tales of Phantasia (Super Famicom version) (Mint Adnade)
- The King of Fighters All Star (May)
- Clannad (Okazaki Ushio)
- G-Senjou no Maou (Azai Kanon)
- Tokimeki Memorial Girl's Side: 2nd Kiss (Young Saeki)
- Wizardry Variants Daphne (Elmon)
- Magical Drop F - Lovers, World

=== Drama CDs ===
- Gohan wo Tabeyou series 1 - 6 (Haruka Kuga)

=== Dubbing roles ===
==== Live-action ====
- Clear and Present Danger (Sally Ryan (Thora Birch))
- Ed (Liz (Doren Fein))
- The Hard Way (Bonnie (Christina Ricci))
- In America (Ariel Sullivan (Emma Bolger))
- Man on Fire (Lupita Martin Ramos (Dakota Fanning))
- Multiplicity (Jennifer Kinney)
- Patriot Games (Sally Ryan (Thora Birch))
- This Boy's Life (Pearl Hansen (Eliza Dushku))
- Village of the Damned (1998 TV Asahi edition) (Mara Chaffee (Lindsey Haun))
- West Side Story (1990 TBS edition) (Graziella (Gina Trikonis))

==== Animation ====
- We're Back! A Dinosaur's Story (Buster the Bird)
- Kung Fu Panda (additional voices)
- The Land Before Time franchise (Ducky)
- ThunderCats (Snarf)
- The Magic School Bus (Arnold Perlstein)
- Bear in the Big Blue House (Ojo)
- Rolie Polie Olie (Zowie)
- Space Jam: A New Legacy (Tweety Bird)

=== Others ===
- Nintendo's The Legendary Starfy television advertisement series (Starfy)
