= Klonoa Heroes: Densetsu no Star Medal =

2002 video game

- Developer(s): Namco (Klonoa Works)
- Publisher(s): Namco
- Director(s): Toshiyuki Nakanishi
- Designer(s): Toshiyuki Nakanishi; Aisaku Yamanaka
- Series: Klonoa
- Platform(s): Game Boy Advance
- Release: JP: December 13, 2002
- Genre(s): Action role-playing
- Mode(s): Single-player

Klonoa Heroes: Densetsu no Star Medal (クロノアヒーローズ 伝説のスターメダル, Kuronoa Hīrōzu: Densetsu no Sutā Medaru; "Klonoa Heroes: Legendary Star Medal") is a 2002 action role-playing game developed and published by Namco for the Game Boy Advance exclusively in Japan. It is the first game in the Klonoa series to combine both standard action-gaming elements with role-playing features.

== Gameplay ==
Taking a unique twist on the normal gameplay of the Klonoa handheld games, Klonoa Heroes instead relies on the player moving Klonoa, Guntz, or Pango across the screen from a top-down perspective, having them defeat enemies and earn experience points in the form of Dream Shards (small, crystal-like objects) and gold, which is used for currency, along the way. Klonoa once again utilizes his familiar weapon, the Wind Ring, but this time the "wind bullet" he can fire from it can be either blue or red. Guntz's handguns and Pango's bombs work the same way. Characters can acquire different weapons throughout the game. Likewise, each enemy in the game is given a color affinity of either blue or red, and Klonoa (or the other characters) can deal more damage to them by attacking with the same color.

Restorative items can be either found in chests located sporadically throughout each level, or purchased from merchants in town. These items, when used, restore a portion of the character's hit points, as well as provide other small benefits. Characters can also "level up", which allows the player to place points of their choice in different statistics: such as attack power, defense, and agility. Players can change the number of points attributed to each stat at any time (when not in a section of a level).

Klonoa and his friends must travel through eight worlds separated into several small levels called visions. At the end of each world, the characters must take on a boss monster, a much more difficult encounter than usual, in order to advance.

== Story ==
Klonoa Heroes takes place in an alternate universe of the series, where Klonoa dreams of earning a Hero Medal, a mystical emblem that ranks one’s heroism. Legends speak of a special variant of the medal that has never been seen. The story begins in Klonoa’s hometown of Breezegale, where he and his friend Chipple seek a rare Hikari Sakura flower, said to bring good luck. After retrieving it, Klonoa learns from Popka, his dog-like companion, that monsters are threatening the town. While investigating, he visits his childhood friend Lolo, a priestess-in-training, who warns him of monsters on nearby Bell Hill. Klonoa is ambushed by Moos but rescued by Guntz, a motorcycle-riding bounty hunter with a bronze Hero Medal. Guntz takes the Hikari Sakura, but Klonoa defeats him and returns the flower to Lolo before her journey. Soon after, Guntz invites Klonoa to join him as a partner, and the two leave Breezegale to pursue bounty hunting.

During one mission, Guntz crosses paths with Janga, a deadly foe responsible for his father’s death. Both Klonoa and Guntz are captured but escape with the help of Pango, a bomb expert pangolin seeking a cure for his son Boris’s mysterious sleeping sickness. Janga, working with the mad clown Joka, plans something sinister involving the Sky Temple. Hoping to find the cure in a sacred book, Klonoa and Pango head to the temple, where they reunite with Lolo. There, Klonoa receives his own blank Hero Medal. Joka kidnaps Lolo and steals the cure’s book. Klonoa and Pango track them to Volk, deducing that Joka and Janga plan to launch a rocket. Despite teaming up with Guntz again, they fail to save Lolo but defeat Joka.

The trio travels by rocket to the moon, where they discover the mastermind: Garlen, who orchestrated the monster attacks and the sleeping sickness to harvest energy from people’s nightmares. His goal is to resurrect Nahatomb, a once-revered hero who became corrupted by his own power and transformed into a demon of darkness. Nahatomb created the Star Medals to drain dreams from aspiring heroes. Sealed in the moon long ago, Nahatomb now needs a priestess as a “living battery” for his revival—hence Lolo’s capture.

En route to Garlen’s base, the heroes confront Janga. In a climactic battle, Janga poisons Klonoa, enraging Guntz, who fatally shoots him. Klonoa falls into a coma, experiencing a nightmare where he must discover why he wants to be a hero. With encouragement from his friends, Klonoa awakens, realizing that his strength lies in always moving forward despite failure. Together, Klonoa, Guntz, and Pango defeat Garlen, but Nahatomb awakens and absorbs him. Empowered by the dreams of those freed from nightmares, including Lolo, the heroes strike Nahatomb down for good.

After the battle, Lolo remains comatose. Pango recalls that the Hikari Sakura can cure sleeping sickness. Since the moon’s weaker gravity allows the flower to bloom, Lolo awakens, fulfilling Klonoa’s promise to protect her. The heroes return home, where Pango cures his son and Guntz departs for unknown adventures. Klonoa discovers that his Hero Medal, which had turned gold, has reverted to blank. Smiling, he declares that “I can be a hero any time,” content with the journey rather than the title.

== Songs ==
Theme song:

- "Sign of Hero" by Kumiko Watanabe (渡辺 久美子), Kanako Kakino (柿埜嘉奈子)

On March 22, 2011, Namco released the full soundtrack for the game called "Klonoa Heroes: Legendary Star Medal Music Collection" which includes the full studio version as well as karaoke version of "Sign of Hero". Previously, fans could only listen to the downscaled GBA synthesized version, with part of the full studio version being heard in a commercial for the game animated by Studio 4°C. The song, as well as the entire soundtrack, is now available on iTunes. On December 20, 2022, the soundtrack was made available for streaming and purchase on numerous other music streaming platforms alongside the soundtracks for Klonoa: Door to Phantomile and Klonoa 2: Lunatea's Veil.

== Reception ==
On release, Famitsu magazine scored the game a 31 out of 40.
