= Klonoa 2: Dream Champ Tournament =

2002 video game

- North American box art
- Developer: Now Production
- Publishers: JP: Namco; NA: Namco Hometek
- Series: Klonoa
- Platform: Game Boy Advance
- Release: JP: August 6, 2002; NA: February 22, 2005
- Genre: Platform
- Mode: Single-player

Klonoa 2: Dream Champ Tournament (Note: Known in Japan as Kaze no Klonoa G2: Dream Champ Tournament (風のクロノアG2 ドリームチャンプ・トーナメント, Kaze no Kuronoa G2 Dorīmu Chanpu Tōnamento)) is a video game published by Namco and released on the Game Boy Advance in Japan in 2002 and North America in early 2005. As the third game in the Klonoa handheld series, the game retains many of the gameplay elements of the previous titles, while adding in a few of its own.

== Gameplay ==
As the third handheld Klonoa game, Dream Champ Tournament plays very similarly to the rest of the games in the series. Using traditional platformer elements, the player can move Klonoa left and right, moving the screen forward as they progress. To defeat enemies, Klonoa will have to use his special weapon, the Wind Bullet, to pull them towards him so he can pick them up. From this position, he can either toss them forward to defeat other enemies, or use them to perform a double-jump to reach places he couldn't normally. In addition, by holding the jump button, Klonoa can flap his large ears to float in place for a short time, which also somewhat increases his jump height or distance.

The game consists of five worlds split into nine small levels called "visions", including a boss level where Klonoa must compete in a foot-race with another adventurer and battle a boss at the same time. One vision is also devoted to a special stage where Klonoa must navigate his hoverboard over water or other terrain while avoiding enemies.

In each vision, there a number of items Klonoa can collect, including exactly 3 stars (Moon Stones), 30 crystals-like objects called "Dream Shards", and one sun-shaped item called a "Sun Stone". The three stars are needed to open the exit door at the end of each vision, but the remaining items are optional. By collecting all 30 Dream Shards, a section of a piece of original artwork is revealed (5 in all, one for each world). If every Sun Stone in the game is collected by the time the player beats it, special stages called "EX Stages" will become available. Beating these new stages has no bearing on the actual game, and are included just for fun.

Klonoa must find the exit to all the visions in each of the five worlds to beat the game, and must race his current opponent at the last vision of each world.

== Story ==
Klonoa 2: Dream Champ Tournament takes place sometime after the events of Klonoa: Empire of Dreams and Klonoa 2: Lunatea's Veil. The game begins with a flashback to when Klonoa defeated the King of Despair, before jumping to the present day where Klonoa receives an invitation letter that floats from the sky telling him that he has been selected to compete in the prestigious "Dream Champ Tournament" among other accomplished adventurers for the title of "Greatest Hero" as well as a cash reward.

After Klonoa finishes reading, he is enveloped in a bright light and finds himself transported inside a gigantic arena alongside several other adventurers. He meets up with his old friends Lolo and Popka, only to learn that they are taking part in the competition as well, and a pompous rogue named Guntz who brushes him off immediately. The master of ceremonies, and sponsor of the tournament itself, Garlen, makes his appearance and informs everyone that they will be paired off in a single-elimination tournament that has them racing across several worlds of his own choosing. The first one to reach the end will be the winner and will advance to the next round. Klonoa asks if Lolo and Popka would want to accompany him, but they decline, with Lolo saying that she has grown stronger since they last met.

Klonoa makes it through the preliminary rounds, as do Lolo and Popka. Klonoa also meets up with Chipple, another old friend, before facing off against his old foe Joka in his first match. Despite Joka's attempted foul play, Klonoa defeats him and advances to the second round while Joka is eliminated. After several matches, Klonoa faces Suiryu who warns him that he will find out Garlen's true colors should he win. At the end, Klonoa defeats Suiryu and witnesses him get turned into a gear, as Garlen admits to changing people into gears to function his fortress. Klonoa is disgusted as his friend Chipple has met this fate and he is not moved by Garlen's words on not turning the winner into a gear and still giving the cash prize. Guntz appears pleased with this, as Klonoa becomes worried on what became of his friend Lolo.

Garlen then broadcasts Lolo as a hostage on the monitor, revealing she is next to turn into a gear after being defeated. Klonoa is angry especially when Guntz mocks Lolo's situation and is revealed to have injured Popka in the match. Klonoa declares that he won't lose to an amused Guntz once Garlen promises to release Lolo. Klonoa faces Guntz and after struggling in their match, emerges victorious over the bounty hunter who is then captured to be made into a gear. Garlen betrays his promise and decides to make Klonoa into his main gear since his talent is incredible, but Guntz interjects and frees Klonoa who faces against Garlen's giant robot to finish him off. Klonoa overcomes Garlen and destroys the machine, while also liberating Lolo.

Garlen's defeat causes his fortress to be destroyed and turns his captives back to normal. Suiryu then arrests Garlen and it is revealed that he infiltrated the tournament to learn Garlen's plot. Guntz then makes off with Garlen's fortune while giving Klonoa the trophy, effectively bestowing upon him the title of champion of the tournament. Everyone celebrates Klonoa's recognition and victory that saved them all.

== Reception ==
Reception

Aggregate scores
Aggregator	Score
GameRankings	77.50%
Metacritic	78/100

Review scores
Publication	Score
1Up.com	B+
Famitsu	8/10, 8/10, 8/10, 8/10
Game Informer	8.25/10
GamePro	4/5
GameSpot	7.6/10
GameSpy	4/5
GameZone	8.5/10
IGN	8/10
Nintendo Power	4.2/5
Nintendo World Report	8/10
X-Play	4/5
DS Central	2/5

Klonoa 2: Dream Champ Tournament received generally positive reviews from critics upon release, earning aggregate scores of 77.50% at GameRankings and 78/100 at Metacritic.
