= Klonoa: Empire of Dreams =

2001 video game

- North American cover art
- Developer: Now Production
- Publishers: JP: Namco; NA: Namco Hometek; EU/AU: Infogrames
- Directors: Junichi Ōno; Taisuke Ishida; Masashi Koyanagi
- Producer: Toshiya Hara
- Designers: Masanosuke Shimizu; Shinsuke Kimura
- Artist: Takashi Yoshida
- Writers: Hideo Yoshizawa; Yoshihiko Arawi
- Series: Klonoa
- Platform: Game Boy Advance
- Release: JP: July 19, 2001; NA: August 30, 2001 (Note: Other sources claim it was released on August 30, 2001.); EU/AU: March 29, 2002
- Genre: Puzzle-platform
- Mode: Single-player

Klonoa: Empire of Dreams (Note: Known in Japan as Kaze no Klonoa: Dreaming Empire (風のクロノア 夢見る帝国, Kaze no Kuronoa Yumemiru Teikoku)) is a 2001 puzzle-platform game published by Namco for the Game Boy Advance. Falling somewhere between Klonoa: Door to Phantomile and Klonoa 2: Lunatea's Veil, Empire of Dreams takes place in the new realm in the Klonoa series, the Empire of Jillius.

== Gameplay ==
Klonoa approaching an enemy while carrying a block

Klonoa: Empire of Dreams is a 2D sidescroller, with the player moving Klonoa left or right on a scrolling screen while defeating enemies using his Wind Ring, a special ring that can shoot a small gust of wind forward and draw an enemy in, allowing Klonoa to lift them over his head. From this position, he can either throw them straight forward like a projectile, taking out any enemy they hit, or he can perform a double-jump, allowing him to reach places he couldn't normally. In addition to enemies, Klonoa can also pick up large square blocks and place them wherever the player chooses. By holding the jump button after Klonoa has left the ground, Klonoa flaps his ears and can float in mid-air for a short duration, which also somewhat increases his jumping height.

The game is progressed by finding the exit to a stage after collecting three stars within the level. Other items like crystals and hearts can be collected in addition, and 1-up items (resembling Klonoa's hat) are usually hidden within a level as well. Hearts can also be found to increase Klonoa's health.

== Plot ==
Klonoa: Empire of Dreams is a side-story to the main console series, and follows the adventures of Klonoa after he mysteriously awakens one morning in the Empire of Jillius and is dragged by the emperor's royal guards to his throne room for seemingly no reason. Emperor Jillius himself informs Klonoa that he broke the sacred law of his kingdom by dreaming, which he views as a worthless endeavor and a total waste of time. The Emperor himself suffers from insomnia, and decrees that if he cannot be allowed to dream, then no one can. Rather than punish Klonoa outright, he instead offers him a challenge: defeat the four great monsters that are wreaking havoc on the land, and he will be set free. Joined by his friend Huepow, Klonoa has no choice but to travel to the surrounding lands and do battle with the monsters living there, hoping to earn his freedom and bring peace to the kingdom at last.

As they defeat the monsters, Klonoa and Huepow become suspicious that someone is using people's dreams for their own ends, as the monsters are in fact transformed versions of various people from each region (including Chipple). Once the duo figure out the culprit is at the imperial castle, they engage Jillius in a fight and manage to defeat him. Only afterwards it is revealed that Jillius' minister, Bagoo, was behind everything. Bagoo, revealing himself to be the King of Despair, explains that through Jillius he had orchestrated a master plan to create his own kingdom of stolen dreams, even if it meant turning all dreamers in the empire into monsters. Klonoa and Huepow manage to destroy him and Jillius afterwards seems to die in Klonoa's arms. It all turns out to be a dream that Jillius himself had and he decides that to give his people their dreams and to protect them as well is his real purpose, thus remaking his empire into the Empire of Dreams.

== Development ==
Empire of Dreams was developed jointly by Namco and produced by Hideo Yoshizawa, who had worked on all the previous Klonoa games. It was the second portable Klonoa game after Klonoa: Moonlight Museum (1999) on the WonderSwan. Unlike the console games, which were focused on action, Yoshizawa wanted Empire of Dreams to focus on the puzzles and "to have the same audience, but let them enjoy it in a different way". Representatives from Namco revealed the first details of the game in March 2001, stating that the title would retain all of Klonoa's "general moves" from the console series on Nintendo's Game Boy Advance (GBA) handheld. The game would later make an appearance at the 2001 Tokyo Game Show that same month, which included an early playable demo. A North American English release was announced at the 2001 Electronic Entertainment Expo the following May, with an initial release date set for August of that year. The game was released on the Wii U's Virtual Console on May 22 in Europe, May 29 in North America, and September 3, 2014 in Japan, and on the Nintendo Classics service for the Nintendo Switch and Nintendo Switch 2 on September 25, 2025.

== Reception ==
Reception

Aggregate score
Aggregator	Score
Metacritic	85/100

Review scores
Publication	Score
AllGame	4/5
Electronic Gaming Monthly	7.83/10
Eurogamer	9/10
Famitsu	34/40
Game Informer	7.5/10
GamePro	4.5/5
GameSpot	8/10
GameSpy	89%
GameZone	9/10
IGN	9/10
Nintendo Life	9/10
Nintendo Power	4/5

Empire of Dreams received positive reviews from critics, earning an 85 out of 100 average rating from aggregate review website Metacritic. Upon its release in Japan, Weekly Famitsu scored the game a 34 out of 40, earning the magazine's Gold Award. GameSpot called it "a highly respectable emulation of the general feel of the Klonoa universe", but overall found it "less ambitious" than Klonoa 2 on the PlayStation 2. They would also praise the game's audio and visual presentation, including its multiplaned backgrounds, image scaling, and rotation effects, declaring that "despite a minimal level of background animation, the game looks awesome". IGN similarly applauded the game's graphic capabilities, but found the color palette a lacking when compared to other GBA games. The website additionally favored its overall gameplay and puzzles, ultimately calling the game "absolutely wonderful" and "one of the most cleverly-designed platform games" on the GBA. During their "Best of 2001" awards, IGN named Empire of Dreams "Best Platformer" for the GBA.

While Game Informer also found the game's visuals to be "sharp and colorful", the magazine also felt that Empire of Dreams didn't take enough advantage of the system by providing "pseudo-3D" background graphics that had become the series hallmark, summarizing that "the end result is a fun game, but doesn't hit the mark as well as previous efforts". GamePro called attention to the "bright, kaleidoscopic levels", declaring that the "graphics and sounds are as sharp as those of any other GBA game", ultimately calling Empire of Dreams "a straightforward platformer with enough gameplay variety that will make you want to play to the very end".
