= 興梠 =

興梠 is a Japanese surname that means rise, small beam supporting the rafters at the eaves.

It may refer to:

- Satomi Kōrogi (こおろぎ さとみ, born 1962), Japanese actress and voice actress
- Shinzo Koroki (興梠 慎三, born 1986), Japanese footballer
