= Kerokero Ace =

Japanese manga magazine

- Cover of premiere issue.
- Categories: Shōnen manga
- Frequency: Monthly
- First issue: October 21, 2007
- Final issue: September, 2013
- Company: Kadokawa Shoten
- Country: Japan
- Language: Japanese
- Website: Official website (archived)

Kerokero Ace (ケロケロエース, Kerokero Ēsu) was a Japanese shōnen manga magazine published in Japan by Kadokawa Shoten. It directly focused on the Sgt. Frog series and other works promoted by Bandai. The magazine contained manga comics, computer game reviews, merchandise promotions and gifts.

== Focus ==
The magazine focused primarily on the series Sgt. Frog, containing features, promotions and a new manga. The manga saw Keroro and his allies sent to an alien world which resembles feudal Japan. They are tasked with attempting to bring order to it.

The magazine's secondary focus was Gundam. Similar to Sgt. Frog, the magazine contained much promotion of its related merchandise and four of the comics running were Gundam titles. These included an adaptation of the television series Mobile Suit Gundam 00, latest chapters of SD Gundam and GPEX Gunpla Extreme, in which humans use special gadgets to shrink down and turn Gundam models into working miniature mecha.

The remainder of titles printed in the magazine alternated between comedy adventure gag comics and further promotional tie ins.

== Titles ==
These manga series were carried by the magazine.

- .hack//Link
- Angler Hero
- Appare! Tonomaru-kun
- Battle Spirits Series
- BB Senshi Romance of the Three Kingdoms: Clash of the Heroes Chapter (SD Gundam)
- Cardfight!! Vanguard
- Chō Seiki α
- Code Geass: Tales of an Alternate Shogunate
- Daikaijū Battle: Ultra Adventure
- Dragon Tamer Sound Spirit F
- GPEX Gunpla Extreme
- Keroro Gunsō Tokubetsu Kunren: Sengoku Ran Star Dai Battle!
- Kung-fu-kun
- MapleStory
- Mobile Suit Gundam-san
- Mobile Suit Gundam 00
- Mugen no Frontier: Super Robot Wars OG Saga
- Net Ghost PiPoPa
- Petit Eva Bokura Tanken Dōkōkai
- Saint Seiya Omega
- Sore Ike! Momotarō Dentetsu
- Sgt. Frog
- Soulcalibur Legends
- Treasure Island Z: The Rose Pearl

== Connection to other publications ==
Due to its role of promoting Bandai projects, the title was linked to similar magazines such as Hobby Japan and Dengeki Hobby. The title also included popular comics which run in Gundam Ace; it was also a special edition of Gundam Ace.

== Gifts ==
Similar to many Shonen magazines (Shonen Ace, Monthly Shonen Sunday), Kerokero Ace often included 'gifts' to increase interest. Such items were usually linked to the comics that ran within the title or exclusive collectables. Items offered included Haro digital watches, Keroro stickers and kaiju trading cards.
