= Cookie's Bustle =

1999 video game

Cookie's Bustle: Mysterious Bombo World
- Developer: Rodik
- Publisher: Rodik
- Director: Keisuke Harigai
- Designer: Aki Harigai
- Programmers: Keisuke Harigai; Kouhei Kanai
- Artists: Aki Harigai; Yoi Hibino; Mikiko Kondo; Makoto Chiba; Naotsugu Yabe
- Writer: Keisuke Harigai
- Composer: Kouhei Okamura
- Engine: Macromedia Director
- Platforms: Microsoft Windows; Classic Mac OS
- Release: JP: December 9, 1999
- Genre: Adventure
- Mode: Single-player

Cookie's Bustle: Mysterious Bombo World (Note: Japanese: Kukkīzu Bassuru: Nazo no Bonbo Wārudo (クッキーズ・バッスル～謎のボンボワールド～)) is a 1999 Japanese point-and-click adventure game developed and published by Rodik on Windows and Mac OS. The game received media coverage in 2022 because of persistent use of the Digital Millennium Copyright Act by a copyright troll to remove traces of the game's existence off the internet.

== Gameplay ==
Cookie's Bustle is a point-and-click adventure game where the player controls the title character, Cookie Blair, with the mouse by having her interact with items and non-player characters by walking into them. Cookie's Bustle also uses several survival mechanics where the player must find food, drink, restrooms, and places for Cookie to rest, as well as kiss her by clicking her when she gets lonely. If the player fails to do so, Cookie will return home, ending the game. Conversely, the player can have Cookie eat too much or hazardous things, thereby reducing her skills in the sports mini games. Dialogue and events for plot-irrelevant non-player characters are randomized. The cut scenes in the game utilize QuickTime.

== Plot ==
=== Setting ===
A hundred years prior to the events of the game, aliens crash-landed on Bombo World, a fictional island country in the South Pacific. In exchange for the aliens' technology, the President of Bombo World gave them the northern part of the island, where the aliens established Derocity. However, some of the Bombo World citizens opposed this exchange and has resulted in terrorist activity against the Bombo World government and the aliens.

The player takes control of Cookie Blair (voiced by Racco Guma), a five-year-old girl from New Jersey who believes she is a bear. She travels to Bombo World to compete in the Bombo World Olympics, a sports event held in Derocity every four years. Other characters central to the game include Nancy Blair (voiced by Miyuki Ichijo), Cookie's grandmother; Unmo Sable (voiced by Shigeru Shibuya), a novelist who helps Cookie get to Derocity; Dr. Right (voiced by Mugihito), a professor; Mr. Goldman (voiced by Kōsei Tomita), a former athlete who Cookie convinces to become her coach; and Jessica (voiced by Satomi Kōrogi), a musician who Cookie meets in Derocity.

=== Synopsis ===
After arriving in Bombo World, which is still in a state of political unrest, Cookie plans on meeting her grandmother, Nancy. However, Cookie learns that Nancy has been arrested and taken to Derocity. As Derocity's entrance has been shrouded by fog, Unmo Sable tells Cookie that she must have a strong heart before she is allowed to pass.

While exploring Bombo World, Cookie meets Dr. Right and Mr. Goldman, the latter of whom she convinces to become her coach. In addition, after Cookie reattaches a missing part to a statue, the statue tells her to look for the grave of John Simpson, the leader of the terrorists. Near Mt. Bombo, Cookie frees Mu, a groundhog, with the help of the goddess of the Rainbow Waterfalls. After lifting the cross on Simpson's grave, his ghost tells her the location of the N66 bomb to pass it on to his allies inside Derocity. Cookie learns that the goblins are in possession of the N66 and trades for it. Afterwards, she is able to cross into Derocity, and the aliens confiscate the N66 from her.

After winning the gold medal at the Bombo World Olympics, the goddess notifies Cookie that the aliens have captured Dr. Right. Cookie arrives at Dr. Right's prison cell too late, but before Dr. Right dies, he informs her that the aliens plan on destroying Earth and the only way to stop the bomb is with the passcode "Nancy" — named after Cookie's grandmother. Cookie also frees Jessica, but the former is arrested by the police and is trapped in prison for three days until Mu saves her. Once Cookie finds Jessica, Jessica gives her a music sheet, telling her that music can convey love. The aliens begin activating the bomb, starting a countdown in Derocity. Cookie briefly reunites with Nancy, who is being pursued by the police for her research with Dr. Right, and the latter gives her an ID card to enter the bomb chamber.

Cookie disarms the bomb in time, but the aliens approach her and reveal that they came to Earth and held the Bombo World Olympics to observe humanity. However, because humans are divided by religion and politics, the aliens have decided to destroy Earth, to which Cookie begs them to give humanity a second chance. Once she returns to Bombo World, during a press conference celebrating her gold medal win, she tells the world that they must stop the war and prove they can be united to prevent the aliens from destroying the world, but the citizens become even more divided. As humanity is erased, Cookie is then pulled into virtual space and remembers from Jessica that music can unite humanity, prompting her to play her song on a piano that is heard by everyone in the world. With the Earth saved, Cookie joins the aliens as they leave for another galaxy.

== Production ==
Cookie's Bustle was designed and conceptualized by Keisuke Harigai, who was also in charge of planning and control. It was produced as Rodik's first video game, a company of which at the time had a total of eight employees. The game took about 2.5 years to develop. Harigai stated that the game was developed with Macromedia Director instead of C++ because of its "multi-platform capability" and effectiveness in reducing development time. Harigai coded the game in Windows while the game assets were created through Macintosh. The 3D assets were created through 3D Studio Max and Poser. The dialogue for Cookie and the non-playable characters were programmed with Lingo so that various conversations can be held between them. Harigai stated in 2001 that Cookie's Bustle originally targeted the European market.

== Legacy ==
=== Copyright claim ===
A company named Graceware filed copyright claims to the game in late December 2022 and January 2023, taking down online footage and other related media. The Video Game History Foundation, who had obtained a CD-ROM of the game and catalogued it on their digital archive, also received takedown notices from the Ukie trade association on behalf of Graceware. The Video Game History Foundation notified Ukie that the takedown notices were not legally enforceable, as Graceware could not prove that they own the copyright, resulting in Ukie no longer sending takedown notices regarding the game.

Despite Rodik closing down, the original developers were made aware of the game's newfound fame and invited players who purchased the original game to a 25th anniversary party in 2026.

== See also ==
- Streisand effect
