= Keroro Gunsō the Super Movie =

2006 film by Yusuke Yamamoto

- Japanese theatrical release poster art
- 超劇場版ケロロ軍曹
- Directed by: Yusuke Yamamoto; Junichi Satō (chief)
- Screenplay by: Mamiko Ikeda
- Based on: Sgt. Frog by Mine Yoshizaki
- Produced by: Masayuki Ozaki; Chieo Ohashi
- Starring: Kumiko Watanabe; Tomoko Kawakami; Chiwa Saitō; Etsuko Kozakura; Jōji Nakata; Takehito Koyasu; Takeshi Kusao; Ogi Yahagi; Yui Aragaki
- Narrated by: Keiji Fujiwara
- Production company: Sunrise (Note: As of 2015, the copyright for this work is owned by Bandai Namco Pictures.)
- Distributed by: Kadokawa Herald Pictures
- Release date: March 11, 2006
- Running time: 60 minutes
- Country: Japan
- Language: Japanese
- Box office: $5,374,376

Keroro Gunsō the Super Movie (超劇場版ケロロ軍曹, Chō Gekijō-ban Keroro Gunsō) is a 2006 Japanese animated comic science fiction film directed by Yusuke Yamamoto and written by Mamiko Ikeda. It is the first movie in the Sgt. Frog series created by Mine Yoshizaki.

== Plot ==
Keroro skips out on destroying military planes in a simulated reality in favor of buying the newest Gundam model with Fuyuki. As they head home, they encounter a mystery shrine resembling a space fort. As Keroro prepares to give a monetary offering, he accidentally drops a 100-yen coin into the shrine, forcing him and Fuyuki to go after it. Inside the shrine is a prehistoric-looking jungle, where Fuyuki finds an ancient dome and a small glass container, inside it a glowing orb. As Keroro triumphantly finds his coin, he knocks over the container, which breaks, causing the orb to shine wildly. After Keroro attempts to fix the container with rubber cement, the duo dashes out of the shrine and toward home, leaving the remaining piece of the container to transform into a pink

As Keroro builds his new GM Sniper Custom model, he discovers a small red X on his face. He goes to both Fuyuki and Natsumi to tell them about his dilemma, but neither of them are of any help. That night, a menacing white Keronian appears from the mystery shrine, and gives numerous Earthlings the same red X. The next day, it is discovered that anyone who possesses this red mark gains telepathic powers named "Revocommi", allowing them to communicate with their minds. The X mark is also contagious: it can be spread from one person to another, allowing other people to become Revolutor. Keroro then orders Kururu to create an amplifying device, planning to use his new power to send amplified orders to the Revolutor of Earth, putting them under his control. That night, the white Keronian (who has taken residence on a tower) sends out a strange signal.

The next day, everyone has become depressed, this is because the Revolutor can sense each other's malicious thoughts, they're avoiding others, and begin to withdraw from society. What's more, because of telepathy, there's no need for cops, TV broadcasts, Internet, or cell phones, and the entire city shuts down. That night, strange green orbs emerge from the Revolutor's marks, and are fed to the white Keronian. On the same night, as Keroro's order-magnifying helmet is completed, the pink Keronian arrives in a gigantic Keronian statue. The Keronian introduces herself as Mirara, the Keron Army's ancient weapon researcher. She is fascinated by Keroro's helmet, but is frightened to see the X symbol on everyone, and tells them a story: The red X is a part of the Keronian weapon named Kiruru, which was sealed away in a vase by the Keron Army. It grows and multiplies from people's conflicts, pain, worries, and negative mental energy, after which it destroys the planet. The only thing that can reseal Kiruru is strong friendship and a heart of trust, but when Mirara reminds the group that invaders and invadees are sworn enemies, more negative energy is produced and Kiruru grows stronger. She turns to Momoka and Tamama for help, but only ends up causing the same problem.

Having absorbed everyone's malicious thoughts, Kiruru transforms into a colossal monster and rampages through the city. The Keroro Platoon decides to take matters into their own hands and send Giroro and Tamama to attack Kiruru, but even their most powerful attacks fail to put a scratch on Kiruru. Seeing no other alternative, Keroro dons the helmet, intending to enlarge himself and send orders to Kiruru. But when that fails, he decides to stall Kiruru while Fuyuki, Natsumi, and Giroro head for the mystery shrine and figure out a way to stop Kiruru. Back at the mystery shrine, Fuyuki and Natsumi discover that it was Kiruru that destroyed the dinosaurs, and when Kiruru absorbs enough dark emotions, he starts multiplying, and only Mirara can stop Kiruru.

Keroro finally admits defeat to Kiruru, who then absorbs his energy, transforming into a large tower. Keroro returns to see the Hinata household (and all of his Gunpla) in ruins. The good memories Keroro and Fuyuki share together cause the red X on their heads to disappear. Mirara appears and gives the group red circles, after which she transforms into a key, which will seal Kiruru if it is inserted into the gigantic X on the tower. Using Mirara's Keronian statue as a mode of transportation, Keroro and Fuyuki are close to approaching the tower, but as soon as they come into close proximity, Kiruru starts to clone himself and chases after them. The statue crash lands, leaving the others to take care of the situation. Keroro and Fuyuki find a new mode of transportation in the form of Mutsumi's giant paper airplane, but the Kirurus continue to multiply. After the key continuously switches between owners, Kululu finally tosses it towards the X, which is shielded by a barrier. The barrier is broken when Giroro flies his mech into it. Natsumi and Giroro hold off the Kirurus while Fuyuki and Keroro go inside the tower.

After a long stairway, the duo find a gigantic glass vase with a key-shaped slot. They finally seal away Kiruru, and the Kiruru Tower disappears in a brilliant yellow light, along with everyone's red X.

== Voice cast ==
Character	Voice actor
Sergeant Keroro	Kumiko Watanabe
Fuyuki Hinata	Tomoko Kawakami
Private Second Class Tamama	Etsuko Kozakura
Corporal Giroro	Jōji Nakata
Sergeant Major Kururu	Takehito Koyasu
Lance Corporal Dororo	Takeshi Kusao
Natsumi Hinata	Chiwa Saitō
Aki Hinata	Akiko Hiramatsu
Saburo	Akira Ishida
Momoka Nishizawa	Haruna Ikezawa
Angol Mois	Mamiko Noto
Koyuki Azumaya	Ryō Hirohashi
556	Nobuyuki Hiyama
Lavie	Tomoko Kaneda
Mirara	Yui Aragaki
Kiruru	Ogi Yahagi
Zorori	Kōichi Yamadera
Manga artist	Tōru Furuya
Narration Paul Moriyama	Keiji Fujiwara

== Video game adaptation ==
Keroro Gunsō the Super Movie
- Developer: Aspect
- Publisher: Bandai
- Platform: Nintendo DS
- Release: JP: March 16, 2006
- Genre: Action game
- Modes: Single-player, multiplayer

Sergeant Keroro the Super Movie: Practice! Assembly of Everyone (超劇場版ケロロ軍曹 演習だよ！ 全員集合, Chō Gekijōban Keroro Gunsō Enshū Dayo! Zenin Shūgō) is a party game based on the movie developed by Aspect and published by Bandai in 2006 and only in Japan.

== Mini-games ==
Mini-games that support the multiplayer mode are marked with * (multi-card play and download play) and ** (multi-card play only).

=== Hashire Kerosu* (はしれケロス) ===
The player must collect 20 coins and reach the goal while avoiding the obstacles in order to not be run over by a steamroller.

The name of the minigame is a parody of Hashire Merosu (走れメロス).

Playable characters: Keroro, Tamama, Giroro, Kururu and Dororo

=== Janpingu Keron** (ジャンピングケロン) ===
The player must reach the top of the levels before the time runs out.

Playable characters: Keroro, Tamama, Giroro, Kururu and Dororo

=== Keron wo Sakaze (ケロンをさがせ) ===
The player must slide the parts of the wanted character until it is complete. After that, the player have to touch it. It must be done before the time runs out.

Playable character: Keroro

=== Keroro Rēshingu** (ケロロレーシング) ===
The player must reach the goal before the time runs out.

Playable characters: Keroro, Tamama, Giroro, Kururu and Dororo

=== Keron Fisshingu (ケロンフィッシング) ===
The player must fish until get required weight before the time runs out.

Playable characters: Tamama (as the fishman), Keroro and Giroro (as the baits)

=== Tatchi Kuraishisu (タッチクライシス) ===
It plays like Time Crisis.

Playable character: Giroro

=== Bouei! Misairu Keron Dā (ぼうえい! ミサイルケロンダー) ===
Kururu must defend the Hinata family's house before it becomes destroyed.

Playable character: Kururu

=== Keron Tagu Match** (ケロンタグマッチ) ===
It plays like Tag Team Match: MUSCLE, but for more advanced players.

Playable characters: Keroro (Special move: Keroro Driver), Tamama (Special move: Tamama Impact), Giroro (Special move: Bull Docking) and Dororo (Special move: Dororo Slash)

=== Keron Torēnā (ケロントレーナー) ===
Keroro must reach the goal before the time runs out by using a mecha robot. It walks continuously and the players must touch the buttons of a "Family Fun Fitness" like carpet on the bottom screen to run faster and to avoid the obstacles.

Playable character: Keroro

=== Keron Sukōpu (ケロンスコープ) ===
The player must find the wanted character before the time runs out. In harder levels, they will do more poses.

Playable character: Keroro

=== Ikuso! Fainaru Batoru (いくそ！ ファイナルバトル) ===
The last minigame is a battle of Keroro Shoutai against Kiruru. It can only be unlockable after the player beat the level 3 of all minigames.

Playable characters: Keroro, Tamama, Giroro, Kururu and Dororo

== Reception ==
Famicom Tsūshin scored the game a 26 out of 40.
