= Mobile Suit Gundam-san =

Japanese manga and anime series

- Cover art to Volume 1 of the Gundam-san manga, artwork by Hideki Ohwada

機動戦士ガンダムさん (Kidō Senshi Gandamu-san)
- Genre: Comedy, mecha, science fiction
- Created by: Hajime Yatate; Yoshiyuki Tomino
- Manga
- Written by: Hideki Ohwada
- Published by: Kadokawa Shoten
- English publisher: Denpa (The Men Who Created Gundam)
- Magazine: Gundam Ace, Comic Charge, Kerokero Ace, 4-Koma Nano Ace
- Original run: June 25, 2001 – present
- Volumes: 22
- Anime television series
- Directed by: Mankyū
- Produced by: Kōichi Ueyama, Shin Sasaki
- Written by: Hideki Ohwada, Mankyū
- Music by: Jun Abe, Seiji Muto
- Studio: Sunrise
- Licensed by: NA: Sunrise
- Original network: Tokyo MX, BS11
- Original run: July 6, 2014 – September 28, 2014
- Episodes: 13

Mobile Suit Gundam-san (Japanese: 機動戦士ガンダムさん, Hepburn: Kidō Senshi Gandamu-san), commonly referred to as Gundam-san, is a Japanese yonkoma (4-panel) parody gag manga series by Hideki Ohwada. A part of the Gundam media franchise, it is a parody of the original Mobile Suit Gundam anime series, featuring Amuro Ray, Lalah Sune, and Char Aznable as main characters. It has been serialized in Kadokawa Shoten's seinen manga magazine Gundam Ace since June 2001 and collected in twenty-two tankōbon volumes.

The manga has spawned an anime television series adaptation by Sunrise. The series of animated shorts was broadcast on the BS11 network between July 6 and September 28, 2014.

== Overview ==
The manga is a parody of the original Mobile Suit Gundam and features most of its characters for its yonkoma strips. In addition, there are several "sub-stories" featured in the manga tankōbon, including Captain Zaku-san (隊長のザクさん), which features anthropomorphic versions of the mobile suits from Mobile Suit Gundam, and Genesis of Gundam (ガンダム創世, Gundam Sousei), which dramatizes the story of the creation of the Gundam franchise and features Yoshiyuki Tomino as well as other staff and cast members. On January 24, 2014, Kadokawa released two tankōbon volumes collecting Gundam Sousei chapters as a separate manga titled The Men Who Created Gundam (「ガンダム」を創った男たち, "Gundam" wo Tsukutta Otoko-tachi). At Anime NYC 2019, Denpa announced that they would publish The Men Who Created Gundam in English, with the omnibus volume released on June 7, 2022.

== Publication ==
Gundam-san began as a fan created yonkoma series on Ohwada's personal website prior to being officially published in Gundam Ace in June 2001. The manga was also serialized in the seinen magazine Comic Charge from the magazine's inception to its cancellation in 2009; in the magazine Kerokero Ace; and in the 4-Koma Nano Ace from 2011. The first collected volume was released on August 24, 2005, and the latest—the 22nd—was released on October 25, 2024.

Another series, Naruhodo! Kotowaza Gundam-san (なるほど☆ことわざ ガンダムさん; lit. "I see! Proverbs Gundam-san") was serialized in Kerokero Ace starting 2007. Its collected volume was released on January 22, 2009. Yappari! Kotowaza Gundam-san (やっぱり☆ことわざガンダムさん; lit. "As I Thought! Proverbs Gundam-san") was released on August 21, 2010. Another book, which included Kotowaza Gundam-san stories, subtitled Nippon Saihakken (ニッポン☆再発見; lit. "Japan Rediscovery"), was released on December 21, 2011. A Kotowaza Gundam-san definitive edition (決定版), including Naruhodo and Yappari and the proverbs which appeared in the anime series, was released on October 25, 2014.

Additionally, a box of mini books and goods about the character Comet Chick was released on July 24, 2007. Also, a fanbook, which included a special story, was released on February 24, 2010.

== Anime adaptation ==
The 13-episode anime television series adaptation was broadcast between July and September 2014 in the BS11 (during the Gundam Selection program) and Tokyo MX networks. Episodes are about 3 minutes each. The show was first announced in a Gundam Ace issue in June 2014. Mankyū directed and wrote the screenplay for the anime. Sao Tamado was the character designer. Tohru Furuya and Keiko Han returned as cast members but did not reprise their original roles from Mobile Suit Gundam as Amuro Ray and Lalah Sune, respectively. Instead all of the roles were cast to new voice actors.

=== Episode list ===
13 episodes are released on television, while the additional extra episodes (including event premieres) are included in the DVD/Blu-Ray release of the anime.

No.	Title	Original release date
1	"He Likes the Red One" "Akai no ga Suki" (赤いのが好き)	July 6, 2014
2	"Amuro Going Through Puberty" "Shishunki no Amuro-san" (思春期のアムロさん)	July 13, 2014
3	"The Melancholy of Haro-Man" "Haro Otoko no Yūtsu" (ハロ男の憂鬱)	July 20, 2014
4	"How They Met" "Deai" (出会い)	July 27, 2014
5	"The Red Comet Chick's Menace" "Suisei Hiyoko no Kyōi" (彗星ヒヨコの脅威)	August 3, 2014
6	"Dr. Sayla's Consultation Room" "Joi Seira no Onayami Soudanshitsu" (女医セイラのお悩み相談室)	August 10, 2014
7	"He Likes Those Who Have Fallen" "Chitta Hito ga Suki" (散った人が好き)	August 17, 2014
8	"Daydreaming Amuro" "Mousou no Amuro-san" (妄想のアムロさん)	August 24, 2014
9	"Showdown of Destiny" "Shukumei no Taiketsu" (宿命の対決)	August 31, 2014
10	"Lalah Moves Out" "Raraa Shutsugeki" (ララァ出撃)	September 7, 2014
11	"A Mobile Suit's Feelings" "Mobiru Sutsu no Kimochi" (モビルスーツの気持ち)	September 14, 2014
12	"Kycilia-tan, Age 14" "Kishiria-tan, Jūyonsai" (キシリアたん14歳)	September 21, 2014
13	"He Likes People with Moles" "Hokuro no Hito ga Suki" (ホクロの人が好き)	September 28, 2014

== Reception ==
Three volumes of the series have been featured on the top 10 of Oricon's weekly chart of the best-selling manga; volume 4 peaked at the fifth spot, while volume 5 ranked ninth, and volume 6 reached the sixth place. Volumes 7, 8 and 9 also reached the chart but at 15th, 29th and 36th place respectively.

The anime DVD and Blu-Ray reached the Oricon's list at the 23rd and 16th place respectively.

== See also ==
Mobile Suit Gundam

Preceded by Gundam Build Fighters	Gundam metaseries (production order); 2013–2014	Succeeded by Gundam Reconguista in G
