= Klonoa =

Video game series

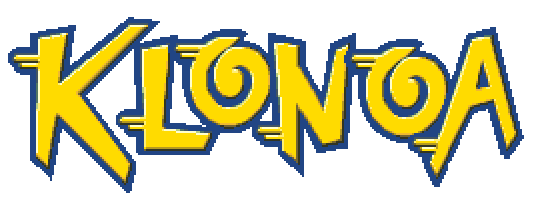
- Genres: Platformer; action role-playing; sports
- Developers: Namco (1997-2002); Now Production (2002); Paon (2008); Monkey Craft (2022)
- Publisher: Namco (1997-2002); EU: Sony Computer Entertainment (1997-2002); Bandai Namco Entertainment (2008-present)
- Creator: Hideo Yoshizawa
- Platforms: PlayStation, WonderSwan, PlayStation 2, Game Boy Advance, Wii, Microsoft Windows, PlayStation 4, Xbox One, Nintendo Switch, PlayStation 5, Xbox Series X/S
- First release: Klonoa: Door to Phantomile; December 11, 1997
- Latest release: Klonoa Phantasy Reverie Series; July 7, 2022

Klonoa (Note: Known in Japan as Kaze no Klonoa (風のクロノア, Kaze no Kuronoa; lit. "Klonoa of the Wind")) is a platform video game series primarily developed and published by Namco. It stars Klonoa, an anthropomorphic creature who explores dream worlds. The series includes two main games: Klonoa: Door to Phantomile (1997) for the PlayStation and Klonoa 2: Lunatea's Veil (2001) for the PlayStation 2. A remake of Door to Phantomile was released for the Wii in 2008, and remasters of both games were released in 2022. The series also includes a set of handheld games released between 1999 and 2002 for the WonderSwan and Game Boy Advance.

== Series elements ==
=== Gameplay ===
The games are set in different worlds, though the primary and known ones are Phantomile and Lunatea. It revolves around Klonoa and how he, the Dream Traveler, must save whatever world he is in from peril. Along the way he makes new friends and enemies, some of them becoming recurring characters. The game is an early example of a side-scrolling 3D game. It is an adventure and puzzle type of game. The main gameplay feature involves using Klonoa's ring and "Wind Bullets" to inflate enemies, which can be thrown at other objects or at the ground, giving him a boost upwards allowing him to double jump.

=== Character ===
Klonoa as he appears in Klonoa Phantasy Reverie Series (Klonoa 2: Lunatea's Veil)

The series stars the titular character, Klonoa, who has features of a cat and rabbit but is not explicitly any particular animal. He is described within the games and manga as a "Dream Traveler", who is fated to travel to various places where the state of dreams is in danger. Voice acting for Klonoa in most appearances is provided by Kumiko Watanabe, although English dub performances have been provided by Eric Stitt in the Wii remake of Klonoa: Door to Phantomile, and by an uncredited voice actor in Klonoa Beach Volleyball. He has Namco's mascot Pac-Man on the side of his blue hat. Wanting to be a hero, he is young and very kind-hearted and is willing to go against all odds to make sure justice is served. He is easily able to befriend characters along the way who support his cause. His attitude is innocent and even a bit naive, as shown in Klonoa 2: Lunatea's Veil.

Klonoa was designed by Yoshihiko Arai. Arai's first design, "Shady", had a shadow-like appearance. However, he felt that the lack of color did not seem tasteful, and dropped the design. His next design was created with characteristically animal eyes and long ears, as Arai felt that a person's eyes and silhouette are the features noticed when they are first met. He added a large hat with a Pac-Man emblem on it and collar to give the character a childlike and energetic quality. The design was kept and used for Klonoa.

== History ==
Release timeline Main entries in bold
1997	**Door to Phantomile**
1998
1999	Moonlight Museum
2000
2001	**Lunatea's Veil**
2001	Empire of Dreams
2002	Beach Volleyball
2002	Dream Champ Tournament
2002	Klonoa Heroes: Densetsu no Star Medal
2003
2004
2005
2006
2007
2008	**Klonoa (Wii)**
2009
2010
2011
2012
2013
2014
2015
2016
2017
2018
2019
2020
2021
2022	**Phantasy Reverie Series**

The first entry in the series, Klonoa: Door to Phantomile (1997), was developed by published by Namco with director Hideo Yoshizawa. The Klonoa character and other game characters were designed by Yoshihiko Arai. The game released to a positive critical reception. Critics labeled it as Namco's first notable 3D platformer and a bid for creating a gaming mascot. The game has been renowned for its blend of 2D gameplay with 3D visuals.

After Door to Phantomile, Namco developed two follow-ups simultaneously: Klonoa: Moonlight Museum (1999) for the WonderSwan, and Klonoa 2: Lunatea's Veil (2001) for the PlayStation 2. Moonlight Museum was released exclusively in Japan, and set the design standards for future handheld Klonoa games. Lunatea's Veil was released to critical acclaim but weak commercial performance.

Namco published three Klonoa games for the Game Boy Advance in the early 2000s. The first two, Klonoa: Empire of Dreams (2001) and Klonoa 2: Dream Champ Tournament (2002), are platform games which continued the 2D gameplay used in Moonlight Museum but with a new cast of supporting characters. The third game, Klonoa Heroes: Densetsu no Star Medal (2002) was an action role-playing game released exclusively in Japan. Also during this period, Namco published Klonoa Beach Volleyball (2002) in Japan and Europe.

With no home console release in the series since 2001, Namco sought to revive the franchise with Klonoa (2008) for the Wii, a remake of Door to Phantomile. The game featured revised graphics and voice acting, as well as new unlockable bonuses not in the original. Despite receiving positive reviews, the game was a commercial failure and plans for a remake of Lunatea's Veil as well as a third main line installment were scrapped.

In September 2019, a trademark filing under the name Klonoa of the Wind Encore was discovered. Further trademark filings for Wahoo Encore and 1&2 Encore were discovered in September 2021. In December 2021, a trademark for Klonoa Phantasy Reverie Series was filed in the United Kingdom. Phantasy Reverie Series, which features remasters of the Wii version of Klonoa: Door to Phantomile and the original Klonoa 2: Lunatea's Veil, was officially announced in a Nintendo Direct in February 2022, and was released in July for Nintendo Switch, Microsoft Windows, PlayStation 4, PlayStation 5, Xbox One and Xbox Series X/S. The game is titled Kaze no Klonoa 1&2 Encore in Japan, making it another entry in Bandai Namco's Encore series of remakes.

== Reception ==
Aggregate review scores
Game	Metacritic
Klonoa: Door to Phantomile	(PS1) 87% (Note: GameRankings score)
Klonoa 2: Lunatea's Veil	(PS2) 91/100
Klonoa: Empire of Dreams	(GBA) 85/100
Klonoa 2: Dream Champ Tournament	(GBA) 78/100
Klonoa	(Wii) 77/100
Klonoa Phantasy Reverie Series	(PS5) 78/100 (XSXS) 79/100 (NS) 78/100 (PC) 76/100

The Klonoa series has been mostly critically well received. It was praised for its gameplay, graphics and story. It also received several awards including Lunatea's Veil winning GameSpy's PlayStation 2 "Platform Game of the Year" in 2001.

However, the series saw disappointing sales commercially. Lunatea's Veil only sold 133,401 copies in Japan during 2001, making it the 85th best-selling game of the year, while Klonoa on Wii only debuted with 5,800 copies sold in Japan, making it the 33rd highest-selling game in the region in its first week.

Phantasy Reverie Series made #5 in the UK sales charts in its first week, with 52% of its sales being on Switch and 33% being on PlayStation 5. While in Japan, the Switch version sold 9,602 copies in its first week, placing fifth in sales charts, whilst the PlayStation 4 version shifted 1,252 units and made #25.

== Other media ==
The character Klonoa has made cameo appearances in other video games developed by Namco. He is playable in Namco × Capcom, MotoGP, Alpine Racer 3, Smash Court 3, World Kicks, Super World Stadium 2000, Family Tennis Advance, Pro Baseball: Famista 2011 and Famista Dream Match. Other games in which Klonoa is referenced in include several games in the Tales of series, several entries in the Taiko no Tatsujin series, several entries in the Ridge Racer series, several entries in the Mr. Driller series (also created by Hideo Yoshizawa), several entries in the Kotoba no Puzzle: Mojipittan series, the Japanese version of Xenosaga Episode I, Final Lap 2000, Namco Stars, Point Blank 3, Family Stadium 2003, QuickSpot, Dragon Tamer Sound Spirit, Seven Bridge, Keroro RPG: Kishi to Musha to Densetsu no Kaizoku, Magical Girl Lyrical Nahoha A's Portable: The Gears of Destiny, We Ski and its sequel We Ski & Snowboard, Soulcalibur V, Tekken 7, We Love Katamari REROLL+ Royal Reverie, Pac-Man Mega Tunnel Battle: Chomp Champs, and Little Nightmares 3, among others. Klonoa: Door to Phantomile is also among the games parodied in the game Segagaga for the Dreamcast, and Klonoa himself is among the many PlayStation heroes featured in the Team Asobi title Astro Bot.

Shippuu Tengoku Kaze no Klonoa is a two-volume long comedy/slapstick manga that, unlike the somewhat more serious tone from the video games, feature Klonoa as a good natured, clumsy and dim-witted kid obsessed with being a super hero. His attempts to make good deeds tend to fail or cause the opposite effect, due to his being overly enthusiastic, his habit of jumping to conclusions and, sometimes, just because of bad luck. The volumes were released in 2002 and 2003.

Klonoa: Dream Traveller of Noctis Sol was a webcomic series published by ShiftyLook, written by Jim Zub and drawn by Hitoshi Ariga. It began in September 2012 and lasted for two seasons with new pages being released every Wednesday, later Wednesdays and Fridays, before abruptly stopping in mid-late 2014 with the closing of ShiftyLook, ending the story on a cliffhanger. In addition, Klonoa has made cameo appearances in ShiftyLook's other series Bravoman: Super Unequaled Hero of Excellence, and Lolo, a recurring character in the Klonoa series, appears in ShiftyLook's web browser-based dating simulation game Namco High, albeit with an entirely different personality from her other appearances.

A Klonoa anime film adaptation was under pre-production at Henshin. Hideo Yoshizawa joined the project as executive producer. Ash Paulsen, a former GameXplain member, also joined in as an associate producer. After two years with no updates, writer Hitoshi Ariga confirmed the project was cancelled on January 4, 2019.
