= Klonoa (2008 video game) =

2008 video game

- European Wii box art
- Developer: Paon
- Publisher: Namco Bandai Games (Note: Published under the Namco brand outside North America.)
- Producer: Hideo Yoshizawa
- Composer: Yoshitaka Hirota
- Series: Klonoa
- Platform: Wii
- Release: JP: December 4, 2008; NA: May 5, 2009; EU: May 22, 2009
- Genre: Platform
- Mode: Single-player

Klonoa (Note: Known in Japan as Kaze no Klonoa: Door to Phantomile (風のクロノア door to phantomile, "Klonoa of the Wind: Door to Phantomile")) is a 2008 platform game developed by Paon and published by Namco Bandai Games for the Wii. It is a remake of Namco's 1997 PlayStation game Klonoa: Door to Phantomile, the first game in the Klonoa series, updating the game with fully 3D graphics, additional content, and gameplay changes. It was released in Japan in December 2008 and in North America and Europe in May 2009.

The game was conceived in an effort to revive the series for its 10th anniversary. It was produced by Hideo Yoshizawa, the director of the original Door to Phantomile, who brought in other former team members. Despite being released to positive critical reception, with some deeming it one of the best titles released on the Wii, it was a commercial failure, resulting in Bandai Namco abandoning its planned revival of the franchise at the time. The Klonoa series would not see another entry in over a decade until Klonoa Phantasy Reverie Series, (Note: Known in Japan as Kaze no Klonoa 1 & 2 Encore (風のクロノア １＆２アンコール)) a compilation consisting of remastered versions of Klonoa and Klonoa 2: Lunatea's Veil, which was released in July 2022.

== Gameplay ==
Klonoa carrying an inflated enemy in the game's first level

Klonoa is a side-scrolling platform video game, serving as a remake of Klonoa: Door to Phantomile. The game follows the eponymous Klonoa and his companion Huepow as they journey to save the songstress Lephise from the evil Ghadius. Players control Klonoa as he runs and jumps through each stage, using his ring to fire a "Wind Bullet" that can inflate enemies. These enemies can be thrown in multiple directions to attack enemies or break obstacles, or launched from to perform an extra jump in mid-air and attack enemies from above. The remake additionally adds an optional "Whirlwind" move that can slow down enemies. The remake features fully 3D graphics as opposed to the original game's mixture of 2D sprites and 3D environments, as well as full voice acting in English, French, German, Italian, Spanish or Japanese, depending on the game's region, in addition to the "Phantomilian" language from the original game. The remake also includes an unlockable Reverse Mode in which players play through mirrored versions of each stage, each containing hidden challenge areas, as well as unlockable costumes based on other games in the series and a Time Attack mode.

== Development ==
Following the merger of Namco and Bandai to form Bandai Namco Holdings in 2005, Namco Bandai Games vice president Shin Unozawa expressed interest in reviving the Klonoa series due to its large fan community. The company chose to remake the original Klonoa: Door to Phantomile for its 10th anniversary, using it to determine if the series would be suitable for a proper revival, and chose to develop it for the Wii due to its wide appeal, allowing the game, like the original, to appeal to both older and younger players. Development of the game began in October 2007.

Klonoa's character redesign (left) and Klonoa's proposed North American redesign (right)

The remake was developed by Japanese studio Paon, with the original game's director Hideo Yoshizawa serving as producer. The development team was formed of former members of the Klonoa Works development studio, including chief planner Tsuyoshi Kobayashi, Yoshihiko Arai, and sound designer Kanako Kakino, as well as fans of the series from within the company. Unlike the original game, which featured 2D character sprites in 3D environments, the entire game features 3D graphics similar to the game's 2001 sequel, Klonoa 2: Lunatea's Veil, with cutscenes recreated in-game. Yoshizawa stated that the Wii's hardware capabilities allowed the team to bring the world of Klonoa closer to its original vision, allowing for elements such as transparent water and sunlight. The remake added gameplay and level tweaks from the original to make the game more "playful", while the unlockable Reverse Mode and costumes were added to appeal to hardcore fans of the genre. The game also features full voice acting in Japanese for the Japanese version and English, French, German, Italian and Spanish for the International versions, in addition to a Phantomilian language option voiced by the Japanese cast. The Japanese cast includes Kumiko Watanabe as Klonoa, Akemi Kanda as Huepow, Yuko Minaguchi as Lephise, and Bin Shimada as Joka. The remake was officially unveiled at the 2008 Tokyo Game Show and released in Japan on December 4, 2008.

During development of the international version, Namco Bandai released a public survey which proposed a region-specific redesign of Klonoa with more cat-like ears, as Yoshizawa felt that the original design would be considered too "old-fashioned" and "cute" for Western audiences. This design was met with negative reception from critics; Joystiq and Kotaku both found the design unappealing and compared it to a bat. As a result, Namco Bandai decided to scrap the redesign and keep Klonoa's original design for the international release instead. The Western release also dropped the Door to Phantomile subtitle from its title and added a new "whirlwind" attack which utilized the Wii Remote's motion functionality. The game was released in North America on May 2, 2009, and in Europe on May 22, 2009.

=== Remaster ===
In February 2022, it was announced that Klonoa: Phantasy Reverie Series, a remastered compilation of Klonoa: Door to Phantomile and Klonoa 2: Lunatea's Veil, would be released for Nintendo Switch, PlayStation 4, PlayStation 5, Xbox One, Xbox Series X and Series S, and PC via Steam on July 7, 2022. It is the fourth remastered title in Bandai Namco Entertainment's Encore series following remasters of Katamari Damacy, Kotoba no Puzzle: Mojipittan, and Mr. Driller Drill Land. The remaster of Klonoa: Door to Phantomile is based on the Wii remake, albeit with HD graphics and updated character models, with the art style being based on the original PlayStation game. The Japanese version had downloadable costumes as pre-order bonuses, and a downloadable Special Bundle was released worldwide that includes the bonus costume items, original soundtracks, and a digital artbook.

== Reception ==
Reception

Aggregate score
Aggregator	Score
Metacritic	77/100

Review scores
Publication	Score
Destructoid	7.25/10
Edge	6/10
Eurogamer	7/10
Game Informer	7/10
GamePro	4/5
GameRevolution	B+
GameSpot	7.5/10
GameTrailers	8/10
GameZone	8/10
Giant Bomb	4/5
IGN	8/10
Nintendo Power	9/10

The game received mostly positive reviews from critics, earning a 77 out of 100 rating from Metacritic. The title experienced low sales in Japan, however, debuting as the 33rd highest-selling game in the region during its first week with only 5,800 copies sold. Its poor commercial performance resulted in Bandai Namco scrapping plans for reviving the franchise, including plans for a remake of the second game and a new third game for the series.

Reviews of the gameplay have been mixed. Weekly Famitsu felt that the game was overall enjoyable, awarding it a 36 out of 40 score and a Platinum Award, but criticised it for a lack of freshness. The magazine also felt that the graphics had "evolved significantly", sentiments echoed by Kotaku, who also praised its gameplay while criticizing the game's overall simplicity, calling it a "fairly stock platformer". GameSpot also felt the game was enjoyable, but criticised the game for being linear and easy. GameSpot praised the game for a large amount of detail, and called the environment "bright and colorful". IGN similarly praised the colours of the game, calling it "visually impressive" due to its "lush water palette" and "great water effects". 1UP.com compared the graphics to those of the original game's successor, Klonoa 2, and would later include the title in their list of the "Six Obscure Wii Games You Must Play". Editors of Nintendo Power named Klonoa as one of the 30 "Wii Essentials" in June 2012, and later ranked it as the 63rd greatest game ever released for a Nintendo console in their farewell issue the following December. GamesRadar placed the game 38th on its own list of the Top 50 Wii games in 2013.
