= Flash Hiders =

1993 video game

- Front cover of Flash Hiders.
- Developer: Right Stuff
- Publisher: Right Stuff
- Platform: PC Engine CD
- Release: JP: December 19, 1993
- Genre: Fighting
- Modes: Single-player, multiplayer

Flash Hiders (Japanese: フラッシュハイダース) is a fighting video game developed and published in Japan by Right Stuff in 1993 for the PC Engine Super CD-ROM² console.

Flash Hiders was followed by a 1995 sequel titled Battle Tycoon: Flash Hiders SFX, which was also released exclusively in Japan, but developed for the Super Famicom.

== Gameplay ==
In Flash Hiders there are three different play modes: a scenario mode, an "Advance mode", and a versus mode. While the scenario mode limits the player to using protagonist Bang Vipot, the "Advance mode" allows the player to choose their character. While the game requires the Super System Card to run, it is recommended that the Arcade Card Pro/Duo is installed in the PC Engine for the game to run at its intended speed. If the game is played with a two-button controller, gently pressing the punch or kick button results in a weak attack while holding the button down executes a harder attack. If it is played with a six-button controller, four basic attacks from weak punch to hard kick are assigned to the first four buttons. Each fighter has three other gauges besides his or her health; the strength of the attacks, the speed of the player, and the toughness of the defense.

== Characters ==
Bang Bipot: The protagonist of the game. A kickboxer from the Wallace tribe who uses the ability to turn into a tiger in one of his moves.

Tiria Rosette: A bojutsu practitioner from the Meijia tribe who uses the fire spirit, Ifreis.

Ottoh Halford: A member of the cyborg tribe, Boranzo. He also wields crowbar-tip claws on his hand.

Harman Do Elan: A member of the Wallace tribe who uses the ability to turn into a panther in one of her moves.

Rablehalt: A sword-wielding knight of the Wallace tribe who can turn into a werewolf in one of his moves.

Spenoza Thunderhead: A member of the Meijia tribe who uses the thunder spirit, Bolvick.

Calnarsa Lue Bonn: A bojutsu expert from the Boranzo tribe.

Horow: A ninja from the Boranzo tribe.

Seena Vanpied: A vampire from the Meijia tribe who uses the ice spirit, Windy.

Graneel: The game's sub-boss. He is a member of the Wallace tribe who wields a lance and can turn into a dragon.

Moonrize: The game's antagonist. A secretary of Spenoza and also a member of the Boranzo tribe.

== Battle Tycoon: Flash Hiders SFX ==
Battle Tycoon: Flash Hiders SFX
- Front cover
- Developer: Right Stuff
- Publisher: Right Stuff
- Platform: Super Famicom
- Release: JP: May 19, 1995
- Genre: Fighting
- Modes: Single-player, multiplayer

Battle Tycoon: Flash Hiders SFX (バトルタイクーン) is a fighting video game developed and published by Right Stuff for the Super Famicom on May 19, 1995. It is a sequel to the original Flash Hiders. Like its predecessor, Battle Tycoon: Flash Hiders SFX simulates the life of a fantasy martial arts prize fighter with an anime theme to it.

=== Gameplay ===
Players can go to the store from sunrise to sunset and upgrade equipment with the money won in a fight. From sunset to sunrise, the player can either bet on arena fights to gain extra cash or participate in them in order to gain experience points. Also, the player has the ability to fight on the streets during any moment of the day. Computer opponents that are defeated in low levels often come back in higher level formats, although they occasionally respawn as a lower level warrior. Sometimes, a player can even fight a clone of either himself or herself. This clone will either be superior, inferior, or on equal terms to the player's character. There are six difficulty levels; Easy, Normal, Hard, Metal, Truth, and Death. The game can be played by either one or two players. There is no blood and fantasy violence (either with or without melee weapons) dominate most of the game.

By the end of most games, the player will have a wealthy, powerful fighter with the strongest gear and protection. Settings for fights can take place anywhere from military bases to arena and even the city streets. Each fighter has three other gauges besides his or her health; they determine the strength of the attacks, the speed of the player, and the toughness of the defense (guard).

=== Characters returned from Flash Hiders ===
- Bang Vipot
- Tiria Rosette
- Ottoh Halford
- Harman Do Elan
- Spenoza Thunderhead
- Calnarsa Lue Bonn
- Seena Vanpied

=== Characters introduced in Battle Tycoon ===
- Guston Slayed: A mixed martial artist of the Boranzo tribe.
- Pachet Vain: A tomboyish swordswoman of the Wallace tribe who can turn into a polar bear in one of her moves.
- Jail Lance: The game's antagonist. He is a sword-wielding member of the Wallace tribe who is also Bang's father. Though he has the spirit of a lion, he does not have a special move that will turn him into an animal unlike other Wallace tribe members.

=== Reception ===
On release, Famicom Tsūshin scored the Super Famicom sequel a 20 out of 40.
