= List of video game mascots =

A video game mascot is a mascot that is used by video game companies to promote both the company and their specific video game series and franchises. Video game mascots are sometimes considered to be similar to those at sporting events, with larger-than-life animals, such as Pikachu or Crash Bandicoot. However, some video game mascots, especially modern ones, are more human, such as Nathan Drake or Lara Croft becoming a series mascot.

There are few rules surrounding which characters are considered to be mascots for a series, but they are generally those that are featured highly in the promotional media for the game, and are often those that are known outside of the game platform. Many video game mascots have transcended their original video game series and have been promoted across multiple games and platforms.

== Company/System mascots ==
- Accolade – Bubsy
- ASCII Entertainment – Ardy Lightfoot
- Bandai Namco Entertainment – Pac-Man, Klonoa
- Capcom – Captain Commando, Mega Man, Ryu, Chun-Li, Morrigan Aensland, Jill Valentine, Chris Redfield, Dante, Phoenix Wright
- Data East – Karnov
- Halfbrick Studios – Barry Steakfries
- Irem – Rocky Rodent
- Kojima Productions – Ludens
- Koei Tecmo — Nyabraham Lynnyahn
- Konami – Power Pro-kun,, Simon Belmont, Alucard, Shiori Fujisaki, Solid Snake Sparkster
  - Hudson Soft – Bomberman
  - TurboGrafx-16 – Bonk
  - PC-FX – Princess Rolfee (formerly NEC)
- LucasArts – Chuck the Plant
- Marvelous Inc. – Yumi
- Midway Games – Liu Kang
- miHoYo - Kiana Kaslana, Ai-Chan, Paimon, DAVIS, Pom-Pom and Bangboos.
- Nintendo – Mario
  - Wii, 3DS, Wii U, Switch and Switch 2 – Miis
  - Game Freak – Pikachu
  - HAL Laboratory – Kirby
- Nippon Ichi Software - Prinny
- Nitroplus – Super Sonico
- PlatinumGames – Bayonetta
- Psygnosis – Owl
- Rare – Mr. Pants
- Sega – Professor Asobin (unofficial, former), Dr. Games (unofficial, former), Opa-Opa (former), Alex Kidd (former), Sonic the Hedgehog, Segata Sanshiro
  - Atlus - Jack Frost
  - Sonic Team – Sonic the Hedgehog
  - Rovio Entertainment – Red
- Spike Chunsoft – Monokuma
- Sony Interactive Entertainment – Ratchet, Toro and Kuro, Sackboy, Nathan Drake, Kratos
  - PlayStation – Polygon Man (former), Crash Bandicoot (former), Spyro the Dragon (former)
  - PlayStation 5 – Astro Bot
- Square Enix – Chocobo (Square), Slime (Enix), Moogle, Cloud Strife, Musashi
  - Crystal Dynamics – Gex
  - Taito – Bubblun, Space Invader
- Studio MDHR – Cuphead
- Sunsoft – Aero the Acro-Bat
- Tengen – Awesome Possum
- Titus Software – Titus the Fox
- Ubisoft – Rayman
- WayForward Technologies – Shantae
- Xbox Game Studios – Master Chief
  - Xbox – Blinx the Time Sweeper
  - Xbox 360 – Marcus Fenix
- Yacht Club Games – Shovel Knight
- 07th Expansion – Rena Ryūgū

== Specific series mascots ==
- Aero the Acro-Bat – Aero the Acro-Bat
- Angry Birds – Red
- Animal Crossing – Villagers, Isabelle, Tom Nook
- Ape Escape – Pipo Monkeys
- Banjo-Kazooie – Banjo & Kazooie
- Battletoads – Rash, Zitz, Pimple
- BioShock – Big Daddy
- Boomerang Kid – Boomerang Kid
- Bomberman – Bomberman
- Bonk – Bonk
- Bubsy – Bubsy the Bobcat
- Castlevania – Simon Belmont
- Circus Charlie — Charlie the Clown
- Conker – Conker the Squirrel
- Crash Bandicoot – Crash Bandicoot
- Croc – Croc
- Danganronpa – Monokuma
- Disgaea – Prinny
- Donkey Kong – Donkey Kong
- Dragon Quest – Slime
- Fallout – Vault Boy
- Fate/stay night – Saber
- Final Fantasy – Chocobo, Moogle, Cloud Strife
- Gex – Gex
- Glover – Glover
- God of War – Kratos
- Gran Turismo – Nissan Skyline GT-R / Nissan GT-R, Toyota Castrol TOM'S Supra
- Halo – Master Chief
- James Pond – James Pond
- Jazz Jackrabbit – Jazz Jackrabbit
- Jet Grind Radio – Beat and Gum
- Just Dance – Panda
- Katamari Damacy – The King and The Prince
- Kid Icarus – Pit
- Kingdom Hearts – Sora
- Kirby – Kirby
- Klonoa – Klonoa
- LittleBigPlanet – Sackboy
- Life Is Strange – Max Caulfield
- Mega Man – Mega Man
- Mega Man Legends – Servbot
- Metal Gear – Solid Snake
- Metroid – Samus Aran
- Minecraft – Steve, Creeper
- Mort the Chicken – Mort the Chicken
- Mortal Kombat – Scorpion
- Pac-Man - Pac-Man
- PaRappa the Rapper – PaRappa the Rapper
- Pikmin – Pikmin and Captain Olimar
- Plants vs. Zombies – Sunflowers, Peashooters, Zombies
- Pocky & Rocky – Pocky & Rocky
- Pokémon – Pikachu
- Persona 5 – Morgana
- Postal – The Postal Dude
- Pro Evolution Soccer - Pierluigi Collina
- Professor Layton – Hershel Layton
- Psycho Soldier – Athena Asamiya
- Punch-Out!! – Little Mac
- Puyo Puyo – Carbuncle
- Ragnarok Online – Poring

-->

- Q*bert – Q*bert
- Ratchet & Clank – Ratchet & Clank
- Raving Rabbids – Rabbids
- Rayman – Rayman
- Resident Evil – Jill Valentine
- Ristar – Ristar
- Rick Dangerous – Rick Dangerous
- Ridge Racer – Reiko Nagase
- Skylanders – Spyro the Dragon, Master Eon
- Sly Cooper – Sly Cooper
- Soccer Kid – Soccer Kid
- Sonic the Hedgehog – Sonic the Hedgehog
- Space Channel 5 – Ulala
- Spyro – Spyro the Dragon
- Star Fox – Fox McCloud
- Street Fighter – Ryu
- Super Mario – Mario, Luigi
- Super Monkey Ball – AiAi
- Tekken – Kazuya Mishima, Jin Kazama
- The King of Fighters – Kyo Kusanagi
- The Legend of Zelda – Link, Princess Zelda
- Tomb Raider – Lara Croft
- Twisted Metal – Sweet Tooth
- Uncharted – Nathan Drake
- Yoshi – Yoshi
- Zero the Kamikaze Squirrel –Zero the Kamikaze Squirrel
- Zool – Zool

== See also ==
- List of computing mascots
- List of mascots
