= Alpine Racer 3 =

2002 video game

- Developer: Namco
- Publisher: Namco: PAL: Sony Computer Entertainment
- Series: Alpine Racer
- Platform: PlayStation 2
- Release: JP: 28 March 2002; PAL: 6 December 2002
- Genres: Racing, Sports
- Modes: Single-player, multiplayer

Alpine Racer 3 (Note: アルペンレーサー3) is a 2002 racing video game developed and published by Namco for the PlayStation 2. It is the successor to the 1996 arcade game Alpine Racer 2 and was released in Japan and PAL regions.

== Gameplay and characters ==
Alpine Racer 3 is a racing video game based on the sport of alpine skiing and snowboarding. Winning races earns the player prize money to buy better snowboards or skiboards, in the Extreme Winners Cup. There are a total of five gamemodes as well as a split-screen multiplayer.

The character Klonoa from the Klonoa franchise appears as a playable guest character. Namco's sports mascot Hitomi Yoshino also appears.

== Reception ==
Reception

Aggregate score
Aggregator	Score
GameRankings	47%

Official UK PlayStation 2 Magazine rated Alpine Racer 3 three out of 10, commenting that it "can be fun" but "lacks the character" of rival ski games, criticising its "limited tricks, bland courses" and the "easily forgettable characters". JeuxVideo.com rated the game six out of 10, being critical to the low number of characters and tracks, stating that it is not as good as the SSX series. German magazine MANiAC gave a score of 56 out of 100, saying that is offers far too little amount of challenge.

The game was not published in North America, with IGN reporting this was due to the "graphics, outdated mechanics, and lack of maneuvers".
