= Klonoa Beach Volleyball =

2002 video game

- European cover art
- Developer: Namco
- Publishers: JP: Namco; EU: Sony Computer Entertainment
- Director: Hideyuki Ishida
- Producer: Tsuyoshi Kobayashi
- Artist: Yoshihiko Arawi
- Composers: Kanako Kakino; Yoshinori Kawamoto; Kazuhiro Nakamura
- Series: Klonoa
- Platform: PlayStation
- Release: JP: April 25, 2002; EU: September 20, 2002
- Genre: Sports
- Modes: Single-player, multiplayer

Klonoa Beach Volleyball, known in Japan as Klonoa Beach Volley: Saikyō Team Ketteisen! (クロノアビーチバレー 最強チーム決定戦!, Kuronoa Bīchi Barē: Saikyō Chīmu Ketteisen!; "Klonoa Beach Volleyball: Strongest Team Playoff!"), is a 2002 sports video game developed and published by Namco for the PlayStation. It is a spin-off of the Klonoa game series, and has the distinction of being the last game Namco published for the PlayStation. Its release was limited to Japan and Europe, with the European release notably featuring the characters speaking in multiple languages, such as English, Spanish, French, Italian and German. This marks the first time the Klonoa series would include separate languages as options, which would not happen again until the release of Klonoa, the Wii remake of Klonoa: Door to Phantomile, years later.

This is one of the only Klonoa titles to feature a multiplayer mode, allowing up to four players to compete in pairs against the other team using a multitap.

== Overview ==
Klonoa Beach Volleyball features three main modes: a multiplayer mode, a championship mode and a training mode which houses the in-game tutorial. In the championship mode, players choose a team of their choosing and make their way through a beach volleyball tournament that consists of five rounds. In the penultimate match, it is revealed that Garlen, the host of the tournament, intends to take over all sports resorts unless the player's chosen team happens to win. Winning the last match allows the player to watch an ending sequence featuring the leader of their chosen team as the credits roll.

Gameplay-wise, Klonoa Beach Volleyball plays just like a proper 2v2 beach volleyball game, with the goal being to keep the ball in the air and return it to the other side of the net. If the opposing team drops the ball, the player's team earns a point, and the opposing team gains a point if the player's team drops the ball. If one team has ten points or higher, they win the match. In addition, all playable characters have a unique special move that is worth a maximum of nine points.

The roster consists of numerous characters from across the history of the Klonoa series, and there are twelve in total each with their own unique stats. Below is a list of all playable characters. Unlockable characters are marked in bold.

- Klonoa
- Lolo
- Popka
- Chipple
- Heart Moo
- Joka
- Leorina
- Tat
- **Guntz**
- **Garlen**
- **Nahatomb**
- **Super Garlen**

In addition to the playable cast, Huepow also prominently appears as the referee, and several other characters make appearances in some specific character endings.

== Reception ==
Reception

Review scores
Publication	Score
Consoles +	80%
GamesMaster	74%
Jeuxvideo.com	10/20
M! Games	72%
PlayStation Official Magazine – UK	7/10
Super Game Power	9.5/10

According to Famitsu, Klonoa Beach Volleyball sold approximately 3,230 copies during its lifetime in Japan. The game garnered an average reception from critics.
