= Klonoa: Moonlight Museum =

1999 video game

- Developer: Namco
- Publisher: Bandai
- Director: Hideo Yoshizawa
- Series: Klonoa
- Platform: WonderSwan
- Release: JP: May 20, 1999
- Genre: Platform
- Mode: Single-player

Klonoa: Moonlight Museum (Note: Japanese: 風のクロノア ムーンライトミュージアム, Hepburn: Kaze no Kuronoa Mūnraito Myūjiamu; Klonoa of the Wind: Moonlight Museum) is a 1999 platform game developed by Namco and published by Bandai for the WonderSwan exclusively in Japan. It is the first handheld game in the Klonoa series to place him in a fully two-dimensional world, and established the system that the Game Boy Advance titles later used.

== Gameplay ==
Klonoa holding an enemy in a level

The player controls Klonoa as he runs, jumps, and fights his way across several worlds, solving small puzzles in the process. Klonoa defeats enemies by picking them up using a special weapon called the "wind bullet", a ring-shaped object inlaid with a small blue jewel that can fire a small burst of wind straight forward and draw in an enemy, allowing for Klonoa to pick them up over his head. Once he has them, Klonoa can either throw them straight forward, taking out any enemies they happen to hit, or use them to perform a double jump, giving him access to places he otherwise could not reach. Also, by holding the jump button, Klonoa can hover in midair for a short duration by flapping his large ears, which also slightly increases his jump distance.

The game itself is divided into five worlds, each of which is split into six stages called "visions". At the end of each stage, Klonoa must find a door which is unlocked by finding all 3 stars within the vision itself. There are also 30 crystals (or "dream stones") in each vision, collecting all these to finish the part of the picture shown at the end of the vision (one picture per world). In addition, Klonoa can also find hearts that can replenish his health, as well as 1-up items that look like Klonoa's hat.

== Plot ==
Klonoa: Moonlight Museum stars Klonoa and his friend Huepow as they come across a young crying girl who tells them that the moon has been divided into fragments and stolen by a mysterious group of artists that reside in the nearby Moonlight Museum. Determined to help, the duo rush off to the Museum's entrance, and once they come inside, they are greeted by a painter named Picoo who traps them inside a piece of artwork. Klonoa and Huepow must fight their way through five worlds within the Museum itself before finding the source of all their troubles and restoring the moon to the sky.

== Development ==
Moonlight Museum was announced a month before its release in April 1999 as a side-story to the original Klonoa: Door to Phantomile for the PlayStation. The game was in development simultaneously with Klonoa 2: Lunatea's Veil for the PlayStation 2, with the production of both games headed by Hideo Yoshizawa. While the Klonoa 2 team focused more on "action", Moonlight Museum's crew was instructed to focus on the "puzzle" aspect, a trend that would continue for subsequent handheld games in the series.

== Reception ==
Reception

Review scores
Publication	Score
Famitsu	28/40
IGN	6/10

Klonoa: Moonlight Museum entered the Japanese sales charts as the 10th best-selling game during its debut week. In a review of an import version in 2000, IGN called the title "a WonderSwan platformer that's cute, cuddly... and painfully average" finding the level design to be "decent (if not a little dull)" and visuals that didn't push the limits of the handheld. The website remarked that the title could be played equally well on the WonderSwan's horizontal or vertical display modes, and the audio was "decidedly above-average" despite limited background music. Famitsu found the game simplistic and fun, but not as good as its PlayStation predecessor. Staff at Retro Gamer listed it among the best WonderSwan games for its cute character designs and replay value.
