= Dragon Tamer Sound Spirit =

2007 video game

- Developer: Namco Bandai
- Publisher: Namco Bandai
- Platform: Nintendo DS
- Release: JP: November 1, 2007
- Genre: Role-playing video game
- Modes: Single-player, multiplayer

Dragon Tamer Sound Spirit (Note: Japanese: ドラゴンテイマー サウンドスピリット, Hepburn: Doragon Teimā Saundo Supiritto) is a role-playing video game published by Namco Bandai for the Nintendo DS handheld video game console.

== Story ==
The hero, a teenage boy in Japan, is trying out his new guitar one sunny day when he suddenly finds himself whisked away to another world. He is woken by Tonto, an otomori and servant of the recently deceased Orochi, one of the seven wise dragons. Tonto informs the hero that he was summoned by Orochi to be his champion, raising and pitting dragon against dragon in a series of battles to change the world.

== Gameplay ==
Most of the game centers around the battles, which use a turn-based system pitting parties of up to three dragons at a time (with up to three more in reserve) against each other. Dragons can be commanded to attack, defend, use a special power (Dragon Force), charge to restore points enabling special moves, or change with another dragon in reserve. Dragons gain experience points from battles with which they can attain higher levels.

The game also has a unique system by which the player acquires new dragons. After finding a dragon egg, it can be brought to the "Nest" in a town, where the player may hatch it by recording sounds into the DS's built in microphone. Some dragons can only be attained by playing particular melodies.

== Reception ==
On release, Famicom Tsūshin scored the game one six, two sevens and one eight for a total of 28 out of 40.
