= Klonoa Phantasy Reverie Series =

2022 video game

- Developer: Monkey Craft
- Publisher: Bandai Namco Entertainment
- Director: Masashi Yamamoto
- Programmers: Takeshi Ohishi; Mineyuki Ueda; Kazuta Tagashira; Tomohiro Nagata
- Series: Klonoa
- Engine: Unity
- Platforms: Nintendo Switch; PlayStation 4; PlayStation 5; Windows; Xbox One; Xbox Series X/S
- Release: JP: July 7, 2022; WW: July 8, 2022
- Genre: Platform
- Modes: Single-player, multiplayer

Klonoa Phantasy Reverie Series (Note: Known in Japan as Kaze no Klonoa 1&2 Encore (Japanese: 風のクロノア 1&2アンコール, Hepburn: Kaze no Kuronoa 1&2 Ankōru)) is a 2022 platform game compilation developed by Monkey Craft and published by Bandai Namco Entertainment. It features remasters of Klonoa: Door to Phantomile (1997), originally released on PlayStation, and Klonoa 2: Lunatea's Veil (2001), originally released on PlayStation 2. The remaster of Door to Phantomile is built from its 2008 Wii remake developed by Paon. It is the first installment in the Klonoa series in 14 years since the 2008 game.

The collection contains updated versions of both games designed to run at 60 frames-per-second and up to 4K resolution on certain platforms, with added features such as adjustable difficulty and a two-player cooperative mode. It was released in July 2022 for Nintendo Switch, PlayStation 4, PlayStation 5, Windows, Xbox One and Xbox Series X/S, for the franchise's 25th anniversary.

== Gameplay ==
Klonoa Phantasy Reverie Series is a compilation featuring remastered versions of the platform video games Klonoa: Door to Phantomile and Klonoa 2: Lunatea's Veil. Door to Phantomile, which was originally released on the PlayStation in 1997, is built from its 2008 remake for the Wii, albeit with character designs and voices representative of the original PlayStation version. Lunatea's Veil is based on its original 2001 PlayStation 2 version. Both games have been remastered with improved visuals and sound.

Both games feature 3D graphics set on a two-dimensional plane where players run from side to side, jump on platforms, and defeat enemies to advance. Players take control of Klonoa, whose primary attack involves grabbing enemies with his Wind Ring, a object that fires Wind Bullets which inflate and pulls enemies back to him to carry. He can then throw them forward or use them to perform a double-jump in midair, allowing him to reach greater heights and bypass obstacles. New features include selectable difficulty levels, a two-player cooperative mode (originally from Lunatea's Veil), a "stopwatch" mode, and a higher resolution and framerate.

== Development ==
In September 2019, a trademark filing under the name Klonoa of the Wind Encore was first discovered, hinting towards a new entry in the series.

Two years later in September, Bandai Namco Entertainment filed a Japanese trademark for "Klonoa Encore", with another trademark named "Wahoo Encore" around the same month, followed by a UK trademark for "Klonoa Phantasy Reverie Series" the following December. The title was officially announced in February 2022 as part of a Nintendo Direct broadcast for the Nintendo Switch along with a release date set for the following July. Bandai Namco confirmed the same day that Phantasy Reverie Series would also see a release on PlayStation 4, PlayStation 5, Windows, Xbox One, and Xbox Series X/S at an undisclosed date. In North America, the collection was given a digital-only release. It is developed by Monkey Craft, who previously worked with Bandai Namco on another remaster, Katamari Damacy Reroll, which was released in 2018. Its release was meant to coincide with the series' 25th anniversary, with the publisher launching a commemorative website at the launch of the game's official page.

== Reception ==
Reception

Aggregate score
Aggregator	Score
Metacritic	(NS) 78/100 (PC) 76/100 (PS5) 78/100 (XSXS) 79/100

Review scores
Publication	Score
Destructoid	7/10
Hardcore Gamer	4/5
HobbyConsolas	79/100
Jeuxvideo.com	15/20
Nintendo Life	8/10
Push Square	7/10
The Games Machine (Italy)	7.8/10

Klonoa Phantasy Reverie Series received "generally positive" reviews, according to review aggregator Metacritic.

Destructoid praised the game's "terrific" aesthetics, lively world, and polished gameplay while criticizing the exclusion of other titles from the franchise and the lack of substantial content outside the two games. Hardcore Gamer gave the title a score of 4/5 and praised the visuals, controls, and audio quality, writing, "[Klonoa Phantasy Reverie Series] is a gorgeous-looking and fun-sounding collection overall and an impressive showcase of how to remake classic games and keep what made them great to begin with intact." Nintendo Life gave the Switch port 8/10 stars and lauded the puzzle-platforming gameplay, HD visuals, and its length, but took issue with the borderline simplistic gameplay, drops in performance, and the lack of content included alongside the two titles. Push Square praised its charming aesthetics, varied level designs, short length, and jaunty music but criticized the "saccharine", insubstantial story, slight difficulty spikes, and single trophy list spanning two games. Pocket Tactics found the title to be a "splendid platformer" and felt that its platforming segments "rival that of Mario and Crash, while it also succeeds in reminding us that it stands alone, and that Klonoa has its own identity."

=== Sales ===
The game made #5 in the UK sales charts in its first week, with 52% of its sales being on Switch and 33% being on PlayStation 5. In Japan, the Switch version sold 9,602 copies in its first week, making it the fifth bestselling retail game of the week in the country, while the PlayStation 4 version sold 1,252 units and was the twenty-fifth bestselling retail game in the country throughout the same week.

It charted as Spain's fourth bestselling PlayStation 5 retail release of July, as well as their second bestselling Xbox Series X/S retail release in the same month.
