= Klonoa: Door to Phantomile =

1997 video game

- North American box art
- Developer: Namco
- Publishers: JP: Namco; NA: Namco Hometek; EU: Sony Computer Entertainment
- Director: Hideo Yoshizawa
- Producer: Shigeru Yokoyama
- Series: Klonoa
- Platform: PlayStation
- Release: JP: December 11, 1997; NA: March 10, 1998; EU: June 5, 1998
- Genre: Platform
- Mode: Single-player

Klonoa: Door to Phantomile (Note: In Japanese: Kaze no Klonoa: Door to Phantomile (風のクロノア door to phantomile, lit. "Klonoa of the Wind: Door to Phantomile")) is a 1997 platform game developed and published by Namco for the PlayStation. It is the first game in the Klonoa series. The story follows Klonoa and his friend Huepow in their efforts to save the dream world of Phantomile from an evil spirit intent on turning it into a world of nightmares. The player controls Klonoa through a 2.5D perspective; the stages are rendered in three dimensions but the player moves along a 2D path. Klonoa can grab enemies and throw them as projectiles, or use them as a jump boost to navigate through the stages.

The game was directed by Hideo Yoshizawa, who conceptualized the setting as a dream world that could appeal to children and adults. The Klonoa character was designed early on and the environments and other characters were designed around him. Door to Phantomile received positive reviews, being praised for its clever level design, impressive graphics and visual appeal. Some critics thought it lacked in certain gameplay innovations and was excessive in its Japanese cuteness. In retrospect, it is considered one of the best 2.5D platformers and PlayStation games.

The game spawned a direct sequel, Klonoa 2: Lunatea's Veil, for PlayStation 2 in 2001, as well as multiple other titles. It was remade for the Wii by Paon in 2008; a higher-definition remaster of said remake alongside Klonoa 2 are included in the Klonoa Phantasy Reverie Series compilation.

== Gameplay ==
Klonoa approaching an enemy

Klonoa: Door to Phantomile is a side-scrolling platform game. It is presented from a 2.5D perspective; the environments are rendered in 3D but the gameplay takes place on a 2D plane. The player moves the protagonist Klonoa along this path; he can run left and right, jump, and hover for a short period of time. The path may often curve, overlap itself, or branch into different directions. Paths visible in the background may be traversed later in the stage.

Klonoa can grab enemies using a large ring inhabited by his spirit friend Huepow. After grabbing an enemy, they are inflated in a similar manner to a balloon and the player can either throw them as a projectile weapon at other enemies, or use them as a springboard to perform a larger jump. Enemies can be thrown into the foreground or background as well as along the 2D plane. The stages are laced with obstacles that must be traversed by using a combination of these techniques. Some stages end in boss fights which take place in circular 3D arenas or head-on against a 2D plane.

== Plot ==
The game is set in Phantomile, a land fueled by dreams people have at night. An anthropomorphic animal named Klonoa has had a dream about an airship crashing into a nearby mountain known as Bell Hill, and the next day an airship does indeed crash into the mountain. Klonoa and his friend, a "ring spirit" named Huepow, decide to investigate. They find a dark spirit named Ghadius and his henchman Joka on the mountain searching for a magical moon pendant so he can turn Phantomile into a world of nightmares, all the while kidnapping the diva Lephise in order to prevent her from renewing the world with her "Song of Rebirth". After a brief scuffle, Klonoa finds the pendant under a bell and ventures back to his home in Breezegale, where his caretaker, Grandpa, tells him that the chieftess of the nearby Forlock Forest, named Granny, knows about the pendant. The pendant is left with his caretaker.

Klonoa and Huepow travel there to find Granny, but end up having to detour to the kingdom of Jugpot to stop the water from flowing backwards, which was something done by Ghadius in order to kill off Forlock Forest. After rescuing Granny from Joka, she tells them about a legend that involves the pendant, the legendary moon kingdom, Ghadius and "the dream not of this world". Granny asks about where the moon pendant's being kept, and Klonoa answers by saying that Grandpa has it. Joka eavesdrops on the conversation, and ventures off to steal the pendant before Klonoa can arrive back. Once there, Joka ends up bombing Klonoa's home while Grandpa is nearby, stealing the pendant after doing so. Klonoa is unable to reach Grandpa in time and he ends up dying in Klonoa's arms, but not before telling him to get the pendant back, which he says is his destiny. Klonoa is distraught by the loss of his caretaker, but Huepow reminds him of their mission.

With the help of the flying fish Pamela, Klonoa and Huepow head to the Temple of the Sun and confront Ghadius at the top, asking him about his motivation in turning Phantomile into a world of nightmares. Ghadius answers by saying he is motivated out of revenge against those who banished him. Ghadius disappears, and Klonoa ends up battling Joka. After Joka's defeat, the moon kingdom, Cress, appears. Klonoa and Huepow make their way there with Pamela's help. There, Huepow reveals himself to be the prince of the moon kingdom, saying that his "ring spirit" form was merely a disguise. Klonoa continues to help Huepow and they make their way to Ghadius, whom they eventually defeat. However, an ancient nightmarish beast known as Nahatomb, who was birthed using the diva Lephise as a living battery and Ghadius' own nightmares, is revived just before he dies. Klonoa and Huepow eventually defeat Nahatomb and restore peace to Phantomile, with Lephise thankful of her rescue.

Later, a noticeably guilt-ridden Huepow finally tells Klonoa the truth; that he was never from Phantomile at all and that all the memories they had shared together prior to their adventure were fake. Klonoa is distraught by the news and initially thinks of it as a lie, but Huepow reaffirms that it is the truth. Huepow then mentions that when Lephise sings the Song of Rebirth, Klonoa will not be able to stay in Phantomile any longer. Moments after, Lephise begins to sing, and a vortex appears in the sky, slowly sucking Klonoa forcefully back to his own world. Now realizing that the bond they shared was truly real despite the fabricated memories, Huepow chases after Klonoa and grabs his Wind Ring, with Klonoa himself clinging on to it, not wanting to leave Phantomile. Eventually, the ring slips from Huepow's hands, and Klonoa is taken back to his home world. The vortex closes, and Phantomile is restored back to normal.

== Development ==
Original concept of the main character

Klonoa: Door to Phantomile was developed by Namco and directed by Hideo Yoshizawa as his tenth project. Yoshizawa is known for having previously directed Ninja Gaiden (1988) for the Nintendo Entertainment System at Tecmo. The idea for Door to Phantomile originated when Yoshizawa wanted to create a more cinematic game following his dissatisfaction with other developers not prioritizing story. The game was originally planned to be an adaptation of the manga Spriggan, but the licensing fell through. Not wanting their work wasted, the team morphed what they had built into an original game. The original concept was more serious and featured robots and an "ancient ruins" motif. The main character was a robot that would defeat enemies with spinning iron balls. This idea was dropped for a dreams motif and a more comical story. Yoshizawa established the dream concept because he was interested in exploring the idea of where dreams go when they are forgotten. He envisioned a world where these dreams could be collected and felt players could relate the setting to their own dreams and experiences. Namco felt that the game would appeal to a wide audience, thinking the adventure-like aspects would be enjoyed by children and the emotional plot twists would be appreciated by adults. Lead designer Tsuyoshi Kobayashi conceptualized the fast-paced action gameplay. Originally the game used three buttons, but was reduced to two for quicker input and faster play.

Klonoa and other characters were designed by Yoshihiko Arai. The initial designs of Klonoa had a shadow-like design and the character was called "Shady". Arai felt that this design lacked color and dropped it. His next design had cat eyes and long ears, as he believed that a person's eyes and silhouette are their foremost features. He added a large hat and necklace to give him a childlike and mischievous quality. The character has features of a dog, cat, and rabbit but is not explicitly any particular animal. His hat features a Pac-Man design. After Klonoa was designed, the setting and other characters were designed around him. Having now adopted a dreams theme, the enemies were designed as nightmarish. Klonoa and Huepow's movements in cinematics were based on motion capture data. Some of the cinematic animators acted out their own motion capture in addition to professional actors. Differences in the character movements can be spotted with a close eye, according to the developers. The 3D graphics and cinematics were made with LightWave 3D. The levels were designed in Softimage 3D. The background music was the work of several different composers, each working on their stages independently.

== Release ==
The game was revealed at the 1997 E3 trade fair with a video demonstration. In previews, both IGN and GameFan compared the 2.5D gameplay to Pandemonium!. Namco stated they hoped the cartoonish antics of Klonoa would appeal to children, their target demographic. The game was also presented at the 1997 Tokyo Game Show with playable demos and an actor in a Klonoa costume. The game was published by Namco on December 11, 1997 in Japan. The soundtrack was published by Nippon Crown in February the following year. It was originally going to feature only a selection of songs because the entire score could not fit on a single disc. It was postponed so it could be upgraded to a two-disc set to fit the full score. Japan also received a manga based on the game, published by Enix in March. Namco published the game in North America in March 1998, and it was published in Europe on June 5 by Sony Computer Entertainment Europe. It struggled to gain sales in North America.

Door to Phantomile was included in a PlayStation 2 compilation of Namco games titled NamCollection in July 2005. The Japanese exclusive compilation commemorated Namco's 50th anniversary and included five original PlayStation games by the company. It was also re-released for Japanese mobile phones in July 2009, and as a downloadable PSone Classic on the PlayStation Network in December 2011.

== Reception ==
Reception

Aggregate score
Aggregator	Score
GameRankings	87%

Review scores
Publication	Score
Computer and Video Games	3/5
Edge	7/10
Famitsu	30/40
Game Informer	8/10
GameFan	276/300
GameRevolution	3/5
GameSpot	9.2/10
Hyper	91%
IGN	8.0/10
Official U.S. PlayStation Magazine	5/5
MAN!AC	87%
Strana Igr	5/10

Critics labeled Klonoa: Door to Phantomile as Namco's first notable 3D platformer and a bid for creating a gaming mascot. GameSpot called it "one of the best side-scrollers in years". Critics praised how the game built upon simple controls and maneuvers to create interesting gameplay. Computer and Video Games liked how the game's level design lent itself as a "satisfying puzzle element" rather than just "an exercise in platform skills". IGN wrote that it was perhaps the best platformer on the market, and "the first 2.5D platformer that makes use of classic 2D game elements without sacrificing the versatility of a 3D environment". Critics praised the level design and diverse environments. Although well made, some argued that it was somewhat formulaic and lacked innovation. Edge explained that "it uses platforming mainstays to create a surprisingly pleasing, if generic, gaming experience." Game Informer recommended it to fans of classic platformers. Ulrich Steppberger of Man!ac praised the game, and only was critical of the game's short length.

The cinematics received praise, with Edge believing they rivaled some film CGI. The in-game graphics and visual artistry were also commended for their quality. The game's Japanese cuteness was met with mixed reviews, some thought it was overly cute. Game Revolution complained about the character voices, and labeled the cuteness "nausea" inducing. Others like Edge and Computer and Video Games appreciated the game's cute aspects. Because of the game's cuteness, Game Revolution felt the game was geared towards children (indeed, Namco itself stated that the game was geared for children). They also believed the game was too difficult for young players while likewise too simple for more skillful gamers. Others agreed the game was too short and could have been more challenging. Game Informer did agree that the game appealed to younger players, but felt the game had a fair challenge and could appeal to those looking for a simple game.

Namco won "Best Character" for Klonoa at the 1997 Japan Game Awards. The game was deemed the Platform Game of the Year for 1998 by videogames.com, which called it a "sleeper hit" and "a triumph from an unexpected source."

According to Yoshizawa, the game sold at least 200,000 copies.

== Legacy ==
Klonoa: Door to Phantomile is remembered for its blend of 2D gameplay and 3D visuals. Critics praised it for retaining classic side-scrolling gameplay while still keeping alongside the industry's transition to 3D. GameSpy, Polygon, and GamesRadar+ ranked it as the 5th, 10th, and 25th best PlayStation game of all-time respectively. Nintendo Power called it "arguably the best platformer released for the PlayStation" and GameSpy called it the best 2.5D game ever and of the best platformers of its generation. In 2015, Hardcore Gaming listed the game on their 200 Best Video Games of All Time.

The game spawned a series of sequels, including a direct sequel titled Klonoa 2: Lunatea's Veil (2001) for the PlayStation 2, as well as other titles for the Game Boy Advance. The original game was remade as Klonoa in 2008 for the Wii, developed with key members of the original team, including director Yoshizawa. A compilation featuring a high-definition remaster of Door to Phantomile and the original Klonoa 2, titled Klonoa Phantasy Reverie Series, was released July 8, 2022 for multiple platforms. The remaster is built from the Wii remake but incorporates elements from the PlayStation original. An anime film set in the same universe as Door to Phantomile was announced in 2016, but was then canceled in 2019.
