= Klonoa 2: Lunatea's Veil =

2001 video game

- North American cover art
- Developer: Namco
- Publishers: JP: Namco; NA: Namco Hometek; EU: Sony Computer Entertainment
- Director: Tsuyoshi Kobayashi
- Producer: Shigeru Yokoyama
- Designers: Masao Kunimori; Toshiyuki Nakanishi; Hideyuki Ishida
- Artist: Yoshihiko Arawi
- Writers: Hideo Yoshizawa; Yoshihiko Arawi
- Composers: Kanako Kakino; Eriko Imura; Katsuro Tajima; Asuka Sakai; Kohta Takahashi; Go Shiina
- Series: Klonoa
- Platform: PlayStation 2
- Release: JP: March 21, 2001; NA: July 24, 2001; EU: November 9, 2001
- Genre: Platform
- Mode: Single-player

Klonoa 2: Lunatea's Veil (Note: Kaze no Klonoa 2 ~Sekai ga Nozonda Wasuremono~ (風のクロノア2 〜世界が望んだ忘れもの〜); "Klonoa of the Wind 2 ~The Lost Article That the World Wished For~" in Japanese) is a 2001 platform game developed and published by Namco for the PlayStation 2. It is the third installment in the Klonoa series and a sequel to Klonoa: Moonlight Museum (1999). The game puts players in the role of Klonoa, who, along with a new cast of friends, has stumbled into another adventure, this time to save the world of Lunatea and help unveil the mysteries of the enchanted world. The game features gameplay inspired by the original Klonoa with 2D side-scrolling in a 3D-rendered environment. Klonoa's equipped weapon is a crystal ring which contains the life of Lolo inside helping him.

Despite underperforming commercially, Lunatea's Veil received widespread critical acclaim, with many critics commending its simple yet challenging gameplay and citing it as one of the best platformers of 2001. A high-definition remaster of the game was released alongside a remaster of Paon's 2008 remake of its predecessor as part of the Klonoa Phantasy Reverie Series compilation in 2022.

== Gameplay ==
Gameplay screenshot

The gameplay of Klonoa 2: Lunatea's Veil is comparable to its predecessor Klonoa: Door to Phantomile, consisting of standard platforming stages and boss battles, as well as board-riding stages. After a specific point in the game, the player has the option of choosing which stage, or "Vision", to play on the game's world map. For most of the game, the player is restricted to a side-scrolling 2D path in a 3D environment, with the ability to move left, right, up, or down. The player can also turn toward or away from the screen to interact with or throw things at objects in the foreground or background. In the standard stages the goal is to reach the end of level by means of using the enemies to overcome obstacles and solve puzzles. Klonoa has a limited amount of health in the form of hearts, which is reduced when coming in contact with enemies and certain obstacles.

In addition to being able to jump, Klonoa can shoot enemies with his signature "Wind Bullet" using the ring he carries. Once Klonoa has shot an enemy with a Wind Bullet, the player can throw it or use it to double jump by tossing the enemy towards the ground after jumping. There are also special kinds of enemies that are required for progressing through each Vision. These include the enemies called "Boomies", which will explode after a certain amount of time and must be used to break certain barricades; "Likuries", which absorb the enemies they are thrown at, resulting in them changing color from which point the player can use them to break crystals of the matching color; "Erbils" that give Klonoa the ability to jump higher than normal; and "Kitons", enemies the player can use to fly for a short time. There are also jet-like enemies and large cannons that rocket Klonoa towards distant parts of a Vision. Additionally, there is a feature that lets a friend use a second controller to make the character Popka give Klonoa an extra boost while jumping. Other than that, however, there is no multiplayer mode in this game. Board-riding stages put Klonoa on a fixed, continuously-moving path towards the end goal. Boss battles normally consists of grabbing enemies or objects to throw at the boss until its health depletes.

In each Vision, there are a number of items for Klonoa to collect. For example, Hearts will refill Klonoa's health and Alarm Clocks serve as a checkpoint in the event the player dies. Each Vision, aside from boss battles, contains at least 150 "Dream Stones" scattered around. The item called the "Mirror Spirit" temporarily makes each stone worth double its original value. Every Vision also contains six star-like items called "Momett Doll Bells". Collecting 150 Dream Stones for a Vision will unlock a picture in the game's "Scrapbook", while collecting six Bells earns the player a "Momett Doll", used to unlock other in-game features.

== Plot ==
=== Setting ===
The game takes place in the dream world of Lunatea. It is composed of four kingdoms. The Kingdom of Tranquility, La-Lakoosha, is a peaceful kingdom that lies at the north of Lunatea and where the High Priestess resides. The Kingdom of Joy, Joilant, is a kingdom to the south of Lunatea and resembles an amusement park. The Kingdom of Discord, Volk, which lies to the west, resembles several metalworking factories and its people wage a neverending war. The Kingdom of Indecision, Mira-Mira, is secluded and snowbound all year long. Each kingdom contains a bell housing its element.

=== Characters ===
The protagonist of the game is Klonoa, known by the people of Lunatea as the "Dream Traveler," one who is summoned to save unbalanced dream worlds. Throughout most of the game, he is accompanied by Lolo, an anthropomorphic monkey and a priestess in training. She has continuously failed the test to become a full-fledged priestess, but is asked by the High Priestess of the Goddess Claire to aid Klonoa in his journey to save Lunatea. She is hinted to have feelings for Klonoa. In the game, she provides the energy of Klonoa's ring. Klonoa is also joined by the dog-like creature Popka, who acts as the rude but charismatic sidekick of Lolo. Despite his rough exterior, Popka cares greatly for Lolo, which is shown to great effect during a pivotal scene later in the story.

Early in the game, the trio seek the aid of the enigmatic prophet, Baguji, who apparently predicted Klonoa's arrival and directs the team throughout the early parts of their journey.

The game's primary antagonist is the pirate Leorina, a former priestess who eventually lost her patience and set off to gain "The power of the gods." She is accompanied by Tat, a floating cat-like creature who has the power to split herself into two beings. She shows a liking to Klonoa at the beginning of the game, giving off a few tips to Klonoa when he is pursuing her.

=== Story ===
The story begins with Klonoa, in what appears to be a dream, being asked for help by an unknown silhouette. Klonoa suddenly starts falling into water. A flying ship, carrying sky pirates Leorina and Tat, appears above him. Before they can take his ring, the priestess-in-training Lolo and her sidekick Popka appear and they fly off, not wanting to risk losing the ring. Klonoa wakes up and is greeted by Lolo and Popka. Klonoa introduces himself, and Lolo mentions that Klonoa is "the name of the Dream Traveler". Klonoa is confused, but before he could ask anything, they are interrupted by a Digon attack that they barely evade. With Lolo powering Klonoa's ring, they make their way across the Sea of Tears and ring the Spirit Bell. Lolo believes she rang the bell, saying she can become a full-fledged priestess now. They then decide to speak to the prophet Baguji, and Klonoa learns that he is in the world of Lunatea.

While the trio speak with Baguji, Klonoa learns about the bells of its four kingdoms, as well as the looming threat of a fifth bell that would cause chaos throughout the land if it were to appear. They then make their way to the High Priestess, where Lolo is granted the title of a priestess. Klonoa learns he must get the elements from the giant bells spread throughout Lunatea in order to stop the fifth bell from appearing. Throughout their journey, their progress is impeded by Leorina and Tat, who at first try to steal Klonoa's Wind Ring but eventually end up gaining data from it in order to create a fake ring, which Leorina uses to gain one of the elements for herself.

At the Maze of Memories in Mira-Mira, Klonoa ends up finding out about Lolo's past; prior to his arrival in Lunatea, she was bullied and mocked by her peers, and after hearing about his foretold arrival from Baguji, decided that she would accompany Klonoa in order to show her peers that she has what it takes to become a priestess. Having been forced to relive this memory, Lolo breaks down and apologizes for everything, with Klonoa noticeably feeling bad for her. Later, Klonoa ends up struggling against the last element's guardian, as the guilt-racked Lolo is on the cusp of giving up, believing that she isn't qualified to save the world, and as a result is unwilling to power the Wind Ring. However, Popka gives Lolo a pep-talk, telling her that "qualifications don't matter" and that Klonoa, despite not being from Lunatea, is giving it his all to save it because he knows that to keep trying is the right thing to do. Lolo ultimately regains her confidence and lends a helping hand to Klonoa.

After collecting the element of indecision, the trio head back to Baguji with three out of the four elements collected. However, they instead end up meeting with Leorina, who disguised herself as Baguji and manages to steal the remaining elements. Leorina disappears, and Klonoa, Lolo and Popka head back to the High Priestess, where they learn that Leorina used to be a priestess in the past. However, she was impatient and ended up leaving the temple altogether, deciding to find her own way of achieving power. In the present, Leorina had gone to the Sea of Tears in order to use the elements' power to re-emerge the fifth bell, which she soon rings just as Klonoa arrives, opening the gate to the fifth kingdom known as the Kingdom of Sorrow, Hyuponia.

After catching up with her, Leorina explains that with the power she has, she'll get her revenge on Lunatea, but instead, she gets cursed by sorrow, turning into a giant silver bird-like creature. After Klonoa saves her, she realizes she was a pawn and she and Tat decide to help Klonoa. The heroes arrive in Hyuponia and eventually end up face to face with its ruler, the King of Sorrow, who tells them that the fifth kingdom was always there, but that they "put a veil over it" and refused to see it, explaining that he only wants to reconnect the Kingdom of Sorrow with the rest of Lunatea so its inhabitants can remember sorrow. It is revealed that the King of Sorrow led the heroes through false prophecies and made them false saviors by using the seer Baguji as an illusion before finally revealing that he was the one who summoned Klonoa to Lunatea, as well as the mysterious voice that wanted Klonoa's help. In the end however, the king attacks Klonoa instead, claiming it will be so the Dream Traveler could "atone for Lunatea's sins". Leorina aids Klonoa by lending him the other elements from her fake ring to Klonoa's Wind Ring, and the King of Sorrow is ultimately defeated. Upon asking for help one last time, Klonoa rings the bell and reconnects Hyuponia with Lunatea.

Klonoa promises the dying King of Sorrow that the world would remember sorrow. The king, content with this outcome, disappears and fades away into particles of light, granting Klonoa the element of sorrow. Sometime later, Leorina and Tat decide to restore the Kingdom of Sorrow, and Lolo gives up her title as a priestess, aiming to regain it on her own. Klonoa decides to return to his home world, and Lolo is disappointed that he has to leave. She initially tells him that it's fine and that she'll be okay because "[she's] going to do [her] best", but ends up breaking down shortly after saying that Klonoa taught her that it was okay to cry so long as she kept doing so. After asking him if it was okay to cry now, she runs up to him and hugs him, crying audibly and begging him not to leave. Klonoa tells Lolo that as long as she doesn't forget the sadness of this moment, they will always be together. After letting out her final tears, Lolo lets go of Klonoa. Klonoa then bids her farewell, thanking her for everything, and walks away as Lunatea ripples into a white void.

In the credits, it is revealed that the inhabitants of the four kingdoms in Lunatea are now moving about freely to the other kingdoms, with some of them assisting Leorina and Tat in rebuilding the Kingdom of Sorrow while others are exploring the other four kingdoms with curiosity and wonder.

== Development and release ==
The soundtrack for Klonoa 2: Lunatea's Veil was composed by eight individuals. A two-disc, 73 track set was released exclusively in Japan by Scitron Digital Content on August 21, 2002. The score includes the vocal song "Stepping Wind", sung by Klonoa voice actress Kumiko Watanabe in the character's fictional in-game language. Despite this, the guidebook released by Enterbrain contains a Japanese translation for the lyrics.

In Japan, Enterbrain released an official strategy guide to Klonoa 2: Lunatea's Veil in 2001. Another guide was released by BradyGames in North America. Yujin released a 4-inch tall gashapon figure of Lolo and Popka as part of the "Namco Girls" Mini-Figures Series 5 collection.

=== Remakes ===
In January 2009, Hideo Yoshizawa, the executive producer and director of the Klonoa series, said that if the Wii remake of Klonoa: Door to Phantomile was received well, he would likely make a Wii version of Lunatea's Veil too, but it never materialised due to poor sales of the first game's remake. In February 2022, it was announced that a collection featuring remasters of both the Wii remake of Door to Phantomile and Lunatea's Veil would be remade in a collection called Klonoa Phantasy Reverie Series for Microsoft Windows, Nintendo Switch, PlayStation 4, PlayStation 5, Xbox One and Xbox Series X/S, which would be released on July 8, 2022.

== Reception ==
Reception

Aggregate score
Aggregator	Score
Metacritic	91/100

Review scores
Publication	Score
AllGame	4/5
Edge	7/10
Electronic Gaming Monthly	8.33/10
Famitsu	8/10, 8/10, 8/10, 9/10
Game Informer	8.25/10
GamePro	5/5
GameSpot	8.9/10
GameSpy	96%
GameZone	9.1/10
IGN	9.2/10
Next Generation	3/5
Official U.S. PlayStation Magazine	4.5/5

=== Reviews ===
Klonoa 2: Lunatea's Veil received "universal acclaim", according to review aggregator Metacritic.

GamePro gave it an acclaimed review, awarding it five out of five, saying that it was "a prime lesson on simple yet addictive gameplay with awe-inspiring visuals - a blend that no gamer should miss". Benjamin Galway from GameSpy gave the game a positive review: "While the story isn't quite as moving as the original, Klonoa 2 has a wonderful mix of action, great control, nice challenge [...], and just beautiful presentation". IGN's David Smith gave the game a positive review: "With the aid of PS2 graphics, not only is Klonoa the star of a superior platformer, he's the star of one of the most beautiful games available". GameZone too gave it a positive review, saying that the game was one that would make you "smile". GameSpot gave it a positive review, praising it for its "airtight gameplay, awesome visuals, and great soundtrack", and saying that it was an "almost perfect platform game [...] almost".

Jim Preston reviewed the PlayStation 2 version of the game for Next Generation, saying that it was "worth renting for its first-rate visuals" but lamented that it was "short, sweet, and shallow".

Although the game was well-received from many game critics, the game underperformed in sales. Klonoa 2: Lunatea's Veil sold 133,401 copies in Japan during 2001, making it the 85th best-selling game of the year. Famitsu reported that the game sold 33,785 copies during its first week of release in that region. Klonoa 2, along with MotoGP and Seven: Molmorth no Kiheitai, were expected to sell a combined 900,000 copies during the release quarter, but only managed to sell 290,000 units together. Lunatea's Veil was re-released in Japan on June 27, 2002 as part of Sony's The Best range of budget titles.

=== Accolades ===
Klonoa 2: Lunatea's Veil won GameSpy's PlayStation 2 "Platform Game of the Year" in 2001 and was later named the 20th best PlayStation 2 game by the website. Gaming Age also named it the best platformer in its "Best of 2001 Awards". It was also a runner-up for GameSpot's annual "Best Platform Game" award among console games, which went to Conker's Bad Fur Day. It was called the tenth best PlayStation 2 game for the system's first year by IGN. In 2004, staff of IGN also included it as "one of twelve games you've probably never played, but should".

In 2025, Klonoa 2: Lunatea's Veil was included on indy100's best 100 video games of all time list.
