= Mr. Driller (video game) =

1999 video game

- European arcade flyer
- Developer: Namco
- Publishers: Namco: PlayStation; JP: Namco; NA: Namco Hometek; PAL: Sony Computer Entertainment Dreamcast, Game Boy Color; JP: Namco; NA: Namco Hometek; PAL: Virgin Interactive Windows; JP: Namco; EU: Midas Interactive Entertainment iOS Namco Networks
- Director: Yasuhito Nagaoka
- Producer: Hideo Yoshizawa
- Designer: Yasuhito Nagaoka
- Artist: Kaori Shinozaki
- Composer: Go Shiina
- Series: Mr. Driller
- Platforms: Arcade, PlayStation, Dreamcast, Windows, Game Boy Color, WonderSwan Color, mobile phone, iOS
- Release: November 1999: Arcade; JP/NA: November 1999; EU: 1999 PlayStation; NA: May 10, 2000; JP: June 29, 2000; PAL: 2000 Dreamcast; NA: June 23, 2000; JP: June 29, 2000; PAL: 2000 Game Boy Color; JP: June 29, 2000; NA: August 3, 2000; PAL: 2000 Windows; JP: March 2, 2001; EU: 2001 WonderSwan Color; JP: April 15, 2001 Mobile; WW: September 20, 2004 iOS; WW: August 28, 2009
- Genre: Puzzle
- Mode: Single-player
- Arcade system: Namco System 12

Mr. Driller (Note: Japanese: ミスタードリラー, Hepburn: Misutā Dorirā) is a 1999 puzzle video game developed and published by Namco for arcades. It was later ported to various home and portable systems. Controlling Susumu Hori, the titular "Mr. Driller", the player must dig their way to the bottom of the screen by destroying colored blocks that litter the playfield. Blocks will be cleared if four or more are touching each other, which can be used to cause chain reactions. Susumu has a constantly-depleting oxygen meter that can be refilled by collecting air capsules found throughout stages.

Mr. Driller was designed by Yasuhito Nagaoka and produced by Hideo Yoshizawa, best known for his work on Klonoa: Door to Phantomile and the Ninja Gaiden series. It was intended as the third entry in Namco's Dig Dug series, tentatively titled Dig Dug 3. Originally meant to be exclusive to home consoles, it was instead made an arcade game to help increase sales. The game was completed before it was ever pitched, leading to a lengthy process that ended with the game being presented to company president Masaya Nakamura.

Upon release, Mr. Driller was met with mostly positive reviews from critics — reviewers praised its "refreshing" gameplay premise, colorful visuals and soundtrack, although criticized its low replay value and lack of extra content. It was met with a long series of sequels and spin-offs for multiple platforms, beginning with Mr. Driller 2 in 2000. The PlayStation version of the game was released for the PlayStation Store under the PSOne Classics series in 2014, before being delisted in 2019. It was also included as one of the 20 games in the PlayStation Classic mini console, and was released digitally on PlayStation 4 and PlayStation 5 in 2022.

== Gameplay ==
Arcade version screenshot

Mr. Driller is a puzzle video game, commonly described as a mix between Dig Dug and Columns. The player controls Susumu Hori, the titular "Mr. Driller", who must destroy all of the piling-up blocks before they take over the city of Downtown. The objective is to make it to the bottom of the stage by destroying, or "drilling", colored blocks that litter the playfield. Susumu can move left and right to drill surrounding blocks, and can also jump up a block next to him by moving against it. Blocks can also be cleared if four or more touch each other, which can be used to cause chain reactions. Blocks will also fall if there is nothing underneath to support them, which can crush Susumu and lose a life if he is under them.

Susumu has an oxygen meter at the right-hand side of the screen, which constantly depletes as the game progresses — he can replenish 20% of his oxygen meter by collecting air capsules found throughout the game. The player will lose a life if his meter reaches 0%. If Susumu drills brown "X-Blocks", which take five hits to destroy, they will release toxic gases and drain 20% of his oxygen meter. If his oxygen drops below 30%, he will begin gasping for air, his face will turn blue, a skull-and-crossbones symbol will appear over his head, and an alarm will go off as a warning sign. The home console versions of the game add two new game modes, a "Time Attack" mode where Susumu must constantly collect clocks to reduce his elapsed time, and a "Survival Mode" where the player must drill as much as they can before dying.

== Development ==
Concept art of the player character

Mr. Driller was designed by Yasuhito Nagaoka and produced by Hideo Yoshizawa, the latter being known for his work on the Ninja Gaiden series for Tecmo. Nagaoka based the concept of Mr. Driller on a Japanese children's game, where at a beach players had to stand a piece of wood in the middle of the sand and carve away the sand without knocking down the wood. The idea of a person being in the sand pile instead of the wood intrigued Nagaoka, who believed it made for an interesting game idea. He also based Mr. Driller on Dig Dug, a classic Namco arcade game from 1982. The prototype was named Dig Dug 3 and starred Dig Jr., a tall and lanky character intended as the son of Dig Dug protagonist Taizo Hori. Nagaoka was designing Dig Dug 3 as a title for home consoles, as arcades at the time were dominated by fighting games.

When Nagaoka showed the prototype game to Yoshizawa, he became immediately interested and joined the project as its producer. Yoshizawa convinced Nagaoka to make Dig Dug 3 an arcade game, believing it would become lost in a crowded home console market. Several changes were made when Yoshizawa joined the project, which included a faster pace, a new player character, and the game being renamed to Mr. Driller. The characters and graphical style were designed by Namco artist Kaori Shinozaki, who had previously assisted in production of Klonoa: Door to Phantomile and LiberoGrande. Shinozaki wanted the characters and look of Mr. Driller to appeal to a wide audience. She used bright, pastel colors like pink and blue to create a bright, colorful world, and designed Susumu to be cute and marketable. The development staff for Mr. Driller designed the game before they ever pitched it to Namco executives, and planned out a location test without any idea how well the game would perform. The game's development cycle, which Yoshizawa described as "the opposite of the typical game development and sales pitch", lead to a lengthy process that ended with the game being pitched directly to Masaya Nakamura, the president and executive chairman of Namco. His approval of the game lead to him being mentioned in the end credits. Minoru Sashida, a graphic designer for games such as Techno Drive and Ace Combat 3: Electrosphere, designed the graphical interface and the overall look of the game.

The soundtrack for Mr. Driller was composed by Go Shiina, a then-new hire for Namco. As the company's other composers were more interested in working on larger franchises, Shiina was assigned to be the composer for Mr. Driller as nobody else signed on. Shiina is known for his strange and unusual-sounding soundtracks, which Yoshizawa felt was a perfect fit for the game's style. He originally made the music sound like "pretty normal puzzle game music", which Yoshizawa rejected and encouraged him to do whatever he pleased for the music. When the finished product was presented to the sales department of Namco, executives estimated that 3,000 units had to be sold in order for the game to turn a profit.

== Release ==
Namco demonstrated Mr. Driller at the 1999 Amusement Machine Show (AMO) in Tokyo, alongside Crisis Zone and Sweet Land 4. The game attracted attention for its colorful graphics and original concept; Game Machine in particular believed that its simplicity would make it a surefire hit in arcades. The game was first released in Japanese arcades in October 1999, running on the Namco System 12 arcade system board and sold only as a conversion kit for other arcade units. Namco released the game in North America the same month, and in Europe later that year.

A PlayStation conversion of the game was released on May 10, 2000, followed by a Dreamcast version on June 23, a Microsoft Windows version and a Game Boy Color version later that year. A version for the WonderSwan Color was released exclusively in Japan on April 5, 2001. A mobile phone port was distributed in 2005. The PlayStation port was digitally re-released onto the PlayStation Store on February 18, 2014, under the "PSOne Classic" brand, which was delisted from the North American storefront on April 4, 2019. The PlayStation version is also one of the 20 built-in games in the PlayStation Classic dedicated console.

== Reception ==
Reception

Aggregate score
Aggregator	Score					
Aggregator	Dreamcast	GBC	iOS	mobile	PC	PS
GameRankings	82%	65%	62%	78%	83%	75%

Review scores
Publication	Score					
Publication	Dreamcast	GBC	iOS	mobile	PC	PS
AllGame	3/5	3/5	N/A	N/A	N/A	3/5
CNET Gamecenter	8/10	N/A	N/A	N/A	N/A	8/10
Edge	N/A	N/A	N/A	N/A	N/A	8/10
Electronic Gaming Monthly	N/A	N/A	N/A	N/A	N/A	6/10
Famitsu	8/10, 9/10, 8/10, 7/10	30/40	N/A	N/A	N/A	8/10, 9/10, 8/10, 7/10
Game Informer	N/A	8.25/10	N/A	N/A	N/A	8/10
GameFan	93%	N/A	N/A	N/A	N/A	(T.R.) 93% 71% (Note: In GameFan's viewpoint of the PlayStation version, three critics gave it each a score of 84, 69, and 60.)
GameSpot	5.6/10	7.9/10	N/A	7.8/10	N/A	6.1/10
GameSpy	8.5/10	N/A	N/A	N/A	N/A	N/A
IGN	8.9/10	6/10	6.5/10	N/A	N/A	8/10
Next Generation	N/A	N/A	N/A	N/A	N/A	4/5
Official U.S. PlayStation Magazine	N/A	N/A	N/A	N/A	N/A	4/5
PC Zone	N/A	N/A	N/A	N/A	80%	N/A

The PlayStation, Dreamcast, PC and mobile versions received favorable reviews, while the Game Boy Color and iOS versions received mixed reviews, according to the review aggregation website GameRankings.

The game was praised for its visuals, addictiveness and soundtrack. The arcade version had exceeded Namco's expectations, selling over 3,000 arcade units shortly after its release.

Reviewing the PlayStation version, IGN stated that it is "quirky, different, and speedy arcade fun", praising its simplistic gameplay and "quirky" graphical style. IGN also praised its soundtrack, comparing it favorably to music composed by Capcom and Konami. NextGen commended the game's layer of strategy and controls. GameSpot applauded the PlayStation port for its "refreshing" gameplay, colorful graphics and catchy music, while AllGame praised its pick-up-and-play gameplay and "clean" character graphics. GameSpot liked the mobile phone version's portability and addictiveness, calling it "a stellar mobile port of a great game", and praised the Game Boy Color port's faithfulness to the original. IGN highly praised the Dreamcast version for its fresh gameplay idea, addictive gameplay and cute visuals.

Criticism was drawn towards the game's lack of replay value and low amount of content. IGN noted that the game was not a "long-term kinda game", saying that it was only best played in short bursts. GameSpot echoed a similar response, criticizing the PlayStation and Game Boy Color versions for lacking any sort of replay value and being a "short-lived" experience, while AllGame disliked the poor amount of content and presentation, unfavorably comparing it to Puzzle Bobble. GameSpot also criticized the PlayStation version for not having a multiplayer mode, although noted that the $20 price point made this somewhat forgivable.

=== Accolades ===
The Game Boy Color version was nominated for "Best Puzzle Game" at GameSpot's Best and Worst of 2000 Awards, which went to Samba de Amigo.

== Sequels and legacy ==
Mr. Driller was met with a long series of sequels and spin-offs for several platforms. The first of these, aptly titled Mr. Driller 2, was released for arcades in 2000 and followed by a Game Boy Advance port a year later, adding multiplayer and new gameplay mechanics. Mr. Driller G was released for both arcades and the PlayStation in 2001 for Japan only, adding a story mode and new characters, including Dig Dug series protagonist Taizo Hori. A Game Boy Advance game, Mr. Driller A, was released in Japan in 2002, featuring support for the GameCube - Game Boy Advance link cable peripheral, which could be used for Mr. Driller: Drill Land for the GameCube, also released in 2002. Mr. Driller Drill Spirits was released as a launch title for the Nintendo DS in Japan and North America in 2004, and in Europe in 2005. Mr. Driller Aqua, an aquatic-themed spin-off, was released for Japanese mobile phones in 2006. An Xbox 360 sequel, Mr. Driller Online, was released in 2008. Two digital-only sequels, Mr. Driller W and Mr. Driller: Drill Till You Drop, were released in 2009.

Protagonist Susumu Hori would make multiple cameos in later Namco video games. He appears as a playable character in the arcade game Star Trigon, and as a supporting character in Dig Dug: Digging Strike, where he would assist the player in sinking parts of the island. The PlayStation Portable version of Pac-Man World Rally adds Susumu and his dog Puchi as playable characters, alongside Mappy. Susumu is also an unlockable character in the Game Boy Advance game Family Tennis Advance and as part of the "Namco Stars" baseball team in the iOS title Famista Dream Match. Susumu also appears in the now-defunct browser game Namco High, simply known as "Mr. Driller".

On June 13, 2022, the PS1 version of Mr. Driller was released digitally for PlayStation 4 and PlayStation 5.
