= Mr. Driller W =

2009 video game

- Developer: Namco Bandai Games
- Publisher: Namco Bandai Games
- Series: Mr. Driller
- Platform: WiiWare
- Release: JP: February 25, 2009; NA: August 24, 2009; PAL: August 28, 2009
- Genre: Puzzle
- Mode: Single-player

Mr. Driller W (Note: Known in Japan as Mr. Driller World (ミスタードリラーワールド, Misutā Dorirā Wārudo)) is a 2009 puzzle video game developed and published for the WiiWare service by Namco Bandai Games. The eighth entry in the Mr. Driller series, gameplay revolves around clearing each level by destroying, or "drilling", large formations of colorful blocks. Players have an oxygen meter that acts as a time limit, and constantly depletes; air is replenished by collecting air capsules, and is depleted further by destroying brown "X" blocks.

Mr. Driller W was part of Namco Bandai's effort in bringing their classic franchises to digital distribution platforms, due to the concept seeing success with services such as Xbox Live Arcade. The game re-uses many assets from previous games in the series, such as Mr. Driller Drill Land and Mr. Driller Drill Spirits. It was the company's first game for the WiiWare service. W received mixed reviews, being praised for its addictive gameplay and visuals and criticized for its lack of content compared to earlier entries and a lack of an online multiplayer mode.

== Gameplay ==
In-game screenshot

Mr. Driller W is a puzzle video game. It features gameplay reminiscent of the Dig Dug series, being presented in a colorful, 2D style. Players control one of seven characters as they must make their way to the bottom of each level, all of which take place in real-world locations such as Japan, Egypt, and even the moon. The seven characters include Susumu Hori, the main protagonist of the series; Anna Hottenmeyer, a German driller and rival of Susumu; Ataru Hori, Susumu's outcast older brother; Taizo Hori, the protagonist of Dig Dug and the father of Susumu and Ataru; Puchi, Susumu's pet dog; Holinger-Z, a drilling robot; and Usagi, Atari's pet rabbit-like alien who is locked from the start. Each character possesses their own unique abilities; for instance, Holinger-Z can sustain an extra hit, essentially doubling the player's life count. The gameplay revolves around destroying, or "drilling", colorful formations of blocks that litter the playfield. The player has a constantly-depleting oxygen meter, which acts as a time limit; oxygen can be replenished by collecting air capsules found throughout the level, while oxygen is lost by destroying brown-colored "X" blocks.

== Development and release ==
With digital distribution services for home video game consoles becoming increasingly popular with players towards the late 2000s, Namco Bandai Games sought to begin production of games exclusive to these services for the purpose of feeding into the demand. After seeing success with games such as Pac-Man Championship Edition and their various arcade game conversions for the Xbox 360, the company looked to other digital services to bring their back catalog of games to. Namco Bandai chose to bring over many of their more popular and well-known franchises to these platforms, due to their large brand recognition worldwide. The popularity and success of the Mr. Driller series prompted the creation of a new game in the series for these services, leading to what later became Mr. Driller W. It was in production alongside the DSiWare sequel Mr. Driller: Drill Till You Drop. The game reuses many assets from previous games in the series, such as Mr. Driller Drill Land and Mr. Driller Drill Spirits.

Namco Bandai teased the game in the January 2009 issue of their magazine Side-BN, alongside Xevious Resurrection and Korogashi Puzzle Katamari Damacy. It was further shown off by Famitsu, presented in conjunction with Drill Till You Drop. It was the company's first game announced for the WiiWare service. It was released in Japan on February 25. The game was later released in North America on August 24, and in PAL territories on August 28. The game features support for the GameCube controller and the Wii Classic Controller, and is backwards-compatible with the Wii U.

== Reception ==
Reception

Aggregate score
Aggregator	Score
Metacritic	71/100

Review scores
Publication	Score
GamePro	4/5
IGN	6/10
Nintendo Life	9/10
Official Nintendo Magazine	70%

According to the review aggregator website Metacritic, Mr. Driller W received "mixed or average reviews". Reviewers focused primarily on the game's lack of content compared to its predecessors, such as the lack of a multiplayer mode.

Nintendo Life described the game as "a truly unique and rewarding action-puzzler". IGN criticized the game for its lack of gamemodes, specifically the omission of a multiplayer, which they expressed confusion towards due to it being a mainstay in the series. A similar response was made by Official Nintendo Magazine, who said the lack of additional game modes ultimately "crippled" the main game. GamePro and Inside Games, by contrast, were content with the package overall, but argued that the $8 price point might turn off those looking for more content.

Most publications agreed that the gameplay was still fun to play and had an addictive quality to it. Nintendo Life labeled it as "urgently addictivey", saying it made for an easy recommendation to puzzle game fans. The simplicity of its gameplay was praised by Inside Games, who felt it made the game unique and was its strongest point. IGN commented on the game's fast-paced action and addictive nature, saying that the game requires the player to simultaneously look ahead and behind their character. GamePro compared the game's simplicity and addictive gameplay to that of Dig Dug, particularly for its arcade-esc feel to it.

Critics praised the game's "Japanese"-like art style and character designs. Nintendo Life in particular claimed the large cast of unique characters gave the game variety, allowing the player to switch between different playstyles. IGN and Official Nintendo Magazine agreed, but argued that some characters — specifically Holinger-Z — were unbalanced. GamePro stated that the artstyle felt like a mix between Hi Hi Puffy AmiYumi and The Powerpuff Girls, posing a cute, bright-looking game. IGN said that it "comes with the usual Japanese quirkiness and charms", praising its soundtrack for the multiple different genres and its cartoonish nature. They also liked the game's implementation of support for the GameCube controller and Wii Classic Controller, as well as its lack of "forced in" motion controls. GamePro and IGN both recommended the game to those who had never previously played a Mr. Driller game before. Retrospectively, Retronauts said that it didn't have anything particularly unique about it, and that it lacked the high-definition visuals and amount of content as its Xbox 360 predecessor Mr. Driller Online.
