= Mr. Driller A =

2002 video game

- Developer: Namco (Project Driller)
- Publisher: Namco
- Producer: Hideo Yoshizawa
- Series: Mr. Driller
- Platforms: Game Boy Advance, mobile phone
- Release: Game Boy Advance: JP: August 23, 2002; Mobile: JP: March 27, 2008
- Genre: Puzzle
- Mode: Single-player

Mr. Driller A (Note: Japanese: ミスタードリラーエース 〜ふしぎなパクテリア〜, Hepburn: Misutā Dorirā Ēsu 〜 Fushigi na Pakuteria 〜; Mr. Driller Ace: Mysterious Pacteria) is a 2002 puzzle video game developed and published in Japan by Namco for the Game Boy Advance. The fourth installment in its Mr. Driller series, players control one of seven characters and must make it to the bottom of the level by destroying colorful formations of blocks. A adds several new mechanics to the gameplay of its predecessors, such as a virtual pet named the "Pacteria" that players can grow and care for.

Created by series producer Hideo Yoshizawa and Namco's Contents & Technology Creator Group, A was developed as part of a partnership between Namco and Nintendo where the former would create a GameCube game that made use of the GameCube – Game Boy Advance link cable. The game was in development alongside its GameCube counterpart Mr. Driller Drill Land, allowing A to borrow several of Drill Land's concepts and ideas. Though it was well-received for its gameplay and additions to the Mr. Driller concept, A was a commercial failure and struggled to gain sales. The game has since been re-released for Japanese mobile phones and the Wii U Virtual Console.

== Gameplay ==
Susumu digging down in the Dori Dorado Ruins mode

Mr. Driller A is a puzzle game similar to Puyo Puyo (1991) and the classic arcade game Dig Dug (1982). Players choose from one of seven characters to play as: Susumu Hori, the protagonist; Ataru Hori, Susumi's self-contained older brother; Taizo Hori, the protagonist of Dig Dug; Puchi, Susumu's dog; Anna Hottenmeyer, a rival driller from Germany; and Holinger-Z, a drilling robot. In each level, players must make it to the bottom of a well by destroying, or "drilling", colorful formations of blocks. Destroying blocks results in those above it falling and connecting with similarly-colored ones; should four or more matching blocks connect, they will be destroyed, which is useful for creating chain reactions. Blocks will also fall if there is nothing underneath to support them, which can crush players that are underneath them. Players will need to manage their constantly-depleting oxygen, which acts as both a health bar and a timer. Oxygen is replenished by collecting blue air capsules, while oxygen is lost by destroying brown X-marked blocks. If a player is next to a block with an open space above it, they can "jump" up that block.

A adds multiple mechanics and concepts to the core gameplay of the series. The main gamemode is "Dori Dorado Ruins", which features Susumu donning a knight's armor and venturing into ancient ruins. In this mode, the player's oxygen meter does not deplete on its own, but instead drains by 1% each time a block is destroyed. Susumu can find houses inhabited by blue creatures named Undergrounders to learn tips and secrets. He can also enter shops to purchase items, such as those that increase his movement speed and a protective shield; these items are purchased with "mileage points", which are earned based on how far the player has gotten in the well. At certain points, Susumu will engage in RPG-esc combat scenarios with Dig Dug enemies Pooka and Fygar. By collecting fruits and vegetables found throughout, the player can feed these to their Pacteria, a gelatinous-like virtual pet that can evolve and grow. The player can transfer their Pacteria pets to the GameCube game Mr. Driller Drill Land for use with certain mechanics and modes in the latter.

== Development and release ==
Mr. Driller A was created by Mr. Driller series producer Hideo Yoshizawa and Namco's Contents & Technology Creator Group (Project Driller). The project came into fruition when Namco was approached by Nintendo to create a new Mr. Driller game for its newly-unveiled GameCube, specifically one that took advantage of the GameCube – Game Boy Advance link cable peripheral. As A was in development alongside its GameCube counterpart, Mr. Driller Drill Land, it borrows several of Drill Land's concepts and mechanics, as well as those from the PlayStation version of Mr. Driller G. The Dori Dorado Ruins game mode was designed to be a slower-paced experience, as it gave the player time to think and search for necessary items. The development team was inspired by early role-playing games for the Nintendo Entertainment System and Family Computer while designing the presentation, leading to Susumu wielding a sword and the setting taking place within ancient ruins. A took little time to produce as the Game Boy Advance's hardware capabilities were comparable to that of the Super Famicom, which many of the staff members had experience programming for.

Namco announced Mr. Driller A in April 2002, the same month it announced Mr. Driller Drill Land. The game was demonstrated Mr. Driller A at the 16th Next Generation World Hobby Fair in July, shown alongside Klonoa 2: Dream Champ Tournament and complimenting Nintendo's booth. Originally scheduled for release on July 12, it was pushed back to August 23 of that year. It was re-released as a budget title under Nintendo's "Value Selection" brand in February 2006. A Japanese mobile phone version was released on March 27, 2008 by Namco Bandai Games, which was accessible through the company's Namco EZ Games storefront for EZweb devices. A was digitally re-released through the Wii U Virtual Console on March 3, 2015.

== Reception ==
Reception

Review score
Publication	Score
Famitsu	8/10, 8/10, 8/10, 8/10

Award
Publication	Award
Famitsu	Gold Hall of Fame

During its first week of release, Mr. Driller A sold 9,189 copies and received the "Gold Hall of Fame" award from Famitsu. By the end of 2002, it sold 14,799 copies and was ranked in Japan's list top 350 best-selling games of the year. The game has since been considered a commercial failure.

Reception for A, both at release and retrospectively, have been positive. Famitsu staff focused largely on the Pacteria raising and RPG-esc game mode; one wrote they complimented each other well and added to the game's replay value. Another enjoyed the number of game modes for having their own playstyles and difficulty options. Colin Tabi of Nintendo World Report stated A "carries the torch well for the series", and enjoyed its addictive quality and simplicity. Though he noted the language barrier prevented players from properly using the Pacteria, Tabi felt the game was a worthy purchase nonetheless. In a 2020 retrospective on the series, journalist Jeremy Parish said that A felt like an appropriate "half-step" between Mr. Driller G and Mr. Driller Drill Land. He compared the Pacteria to the Chao Garden in Sega's Sonic Adventure, claiming it was the game's centerpiece and a unique concept for the series.
