= Go Shiina =

Japanese composer (born 1974)

Go Shiina 椎名 豪
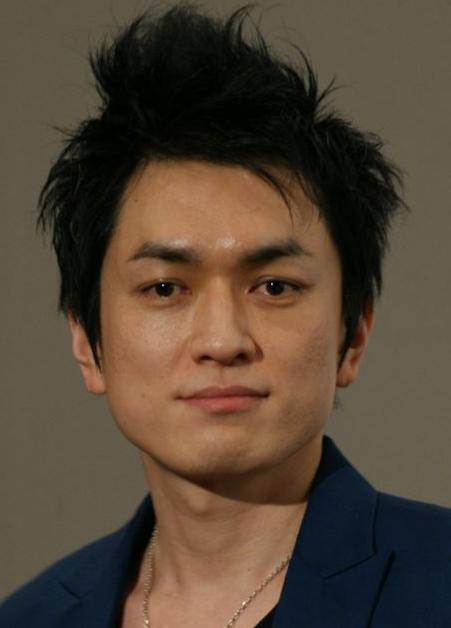

Background information
- Born: Masaru Shiina; May 16, 1974 (age 52); Yashio, Saitama, Japan
- Genres: Orchestral; jazz fusion; rock; electronic; video game music
- Occupations: Composer; arranger
- Instrument: Keyboard
- Years active: 1998–present

Masaru Shiina (椎名 豪, Shiina Masaru; born May 16, 1974), known professionally as Go Shiina, is a Japanese music composer primarily known for his work in video games and anime. He joined Namco in 1997 and was best known during his time with the company for writing music for a number of games in the Tales, Mr. Driller, and God Eater franchises, He gained widespread recognition with his score for Tales of Legendia in 2005. Since then, he has also contributed music for several titles in the Tekken, Ace Combat, and The Idolmaster franchises. In addition to video games, Shiina has also composed soundtracks for various anime series and films, starting with the 2011 film Sakura no Ondo and Demon Slayer: Kimetsu no Yaiba, as well as composing and arranging songs for bands and other artists.

Shiina's works is known for having strong and heavy, orchestral sounds. He left Bandai Namco Entertainment in 2017, and is currently a freelance composer. Despite being freelance, he has continued to work with the company for various other projects, including the God Eater series, as well as other games such as Code Vein.

== Biography ==
Born in Saitama, Japan, Shiina was taught how to play the electronic organ from his parents when he was growing up. Although he was not a dedicated musician before becoming a composer, he was at one time a member of a Megadeth cover band who also played J-pop music. Shiina enrolled at Dokkyo Junior High School. After being rejected by 46 companies, including a jewelry company, a finance company, and a fast food company, he was hired by Namco (now Bandai Namco Games); he had little prior experience with video games.

Creating music for old arcade releases using Namco's sound trackers felt more like computer programming than composing for Shiina, but he has said that the experience helped him out when he would have to use MIDI sounds in future games. The songs he composed for the first Mr. Driller were deemed unfitting for a puzzle game by some of the staff and they almost didn't make it into the final product.

Shiina's first solo project was Mr. Driller G. He was given extensive access to live instruments and an incredible amount of creative freedom, setting the stage for his later work. The scores for future games in the Mr. Driller series would also be composed exclusively by Shiina.

When he began writing songs for Tales of Legendia, he originally tried to follow in the footsteps of the lead Tales series composer Motoi Sakuraba, but was later inspired to develop his own style for it.

Bandai Namco gave Shiina freedom to compose for anime projects during his later years with the company. In September 2017, Shiina announced that he had retired from Bandai Namco. He is currently a freelance composer.

== Musical style and influences ==
Go Shiina's music is characterized by dramatic melodies and unusual arrangements. His soundtracks contain a wide range of musical styles, including jazz, orchestral, fusion, and rock, and he often mixes different genres and instruments together for unique sounds. Many of Shiina's songs use live string sections, slap bass, audio filter effects and artificial languages.

He has said that he can write music in any genre, as long as he is motivated, and has also stated that "when I write a song, the time it takes me depends on whether I know the singer's natural voice. The genre doesn't matter..." Shiina feels that there are two types of compositions: "some tracks can stand alone as musical pieces, and some only work when you hear them in the game," and he often alters or leaves out certain songs when putting together albums. When composing vocal or instrumental tracks, he often sings the parts out loud.

For the soundtrack to God Eater, Shiina explained that the creative nature of the story pushed him to be creative with the music as well. He looked around for a variety of instruments from many countries, and some of the styles and instruments featured in the score include Japanese traditional music, African rhythms, and the Indian sitar. He has also done string arrangements for bands.

== Awards and honors ==
On 14 May 2021, asteroid 119846 Goshiina, discovered by American astronomer Roy A. Tucker at the Goodricke-Pigott in 2002, was named in his honor by the Working Group for Small Bodies Nomenclature.

Shiina was honored in the Sound/Music/Performance category at the 2022 Tokyo Anime Film Festival along with composer, Yuki Kajiura. The two composers were also jointly nominated for Best Score at the 4th Crunchyroll Anime Awards in 2021 for their work on Demon Slayer: Kimetsu no Yaiba, and won at the sixth edition in 2022 for the second season's Mugen Train Arc. The film version was also honored at the 2021 Japanese Academy Awards for Outstanding Score.

== Works ==
=== Video games ===
- Hammer Champ (1998)
- World Stadium 98 EX (1998)
- Ace Combat 3: Electrosphere (1998) – with various others
- Quick & Crash (1998)
- Mr. Driller (1999)
- Mr. Driller 2 (2000)
- Klonoa 2: Lunatea's Veil (2001) – with Kanako Kakino, Eriko Imura, Katsuro Tajima, and Asuka Sakai
- Mr. Driller G (2001)
- Taiko no Tatsujin 3 (2002) – with various others
- Mr. Driller: Drill Land (2002)
- MotoGP 3 (2003) – one track
- Taiko no Tatsujin: Appare Sandaime (2003) – "MEKADON~Uchuu ni Kieta Meka Taiko"
- The Idolmaster (2005) – "Taiyou no Jealousy" and "Aoi Tori"
- Tales of Legendia (2005)
- Tekken: Dark Resurrection (2005) – with various others
- Tales of the World: Radiant Mythology (2006) – with Motoi Sakuraba and Takuya Yasuda
- Pro Baseball Nechu Star 2006 (2006) – opening theme
- Kyou Kara Maoh! - Hajimari no Tabi (2006) – with various others
- Tales of Fandom Vol.2 (2007) – opening and ending theme
- Tekken 6 (2007) – with various others
- Taiko no Tatsujin 11 (2008) – "Haikei, Gakkou nite..."
- Mr. Driller Online (2008)
- Tales of the World: Radiant Mythology 2 (2009) – with various others
- Tales of VS. (2009) – with Motoi Sakuraba
- The Idolmaster Dearly Stars (2009) – "ALIVE"
- God Eater (2010)
- Ace Combat: Joint Assault (2010) – with Kanako Kakino and Inon Zur
- Gods Eater Burst (2010)
- Tales of the World: Radiant Mythology 3 (2011) – with Motoi Sakuraba, Takuya Yasuda, Kota Nakashima, and Kazuhiro Nakamura
- Tekken Tag Tournament 2 (2011) – with various others
- Ace Combat 3D: Assault Horizon Legacy (2012) – with various others
- Tales of the Heroes: Twin Brave (2012) – with Motoi Sakuraba
- Tales of the World: Tactics Union (2012)
- God Eater 2 (2013)
- Golden Time: Vivid Memories (2014) – ending themes
- The Idolmaster One For All (2014) – "Saihyou"
- Tales of the World: Reve Unitia (2014)
- God Eater 2: Rage Burst (2015)
- Tales of Zestiria (2015) – with Motoi Sakuraba
- God Eater Resurrection (2015)
- Tales of the Rays (2017) – with Motoi Sakuraba, Eriko Sakurai, and Kazuhiro Nakamura
- Tekken 7: Fated Retribution (2017) – "DUOMO DI SIRIO 1st" and "DUOMO DI SIRIO 2nd"
- LayereD Stories 0 (2017) – with Mitsuhiro Kitadani and Hiroyuki Fujita
- The Idolmaster Stella Stage (2017) – "Blooming Star"
- God Eater Resonant Ops (2018)
- God Eater 3 (2018)
- Sound Voltex Vivid Wave (2019) – "Unkai"
- Yume Utsutsu Re:Master (2019) – "Natsukashi Machi"
- Code Vein (2019)
- Various Daylife (2019)
- Arknights (2020) – "Tower Fierce"
- 9-nine- Shinshou (2021) – "InFINITE Line"
- Uma Musume Pretty Derby (2021) - "Takarazuka Kinen Race" (Fanfare)
- Tales of Luminaria (2022) – with Homari Kawazu, and Yuri Ookubo
- Harvestella (2022)
- Sin Chronicle (2023) – "Kenshi"
- Tekken 8 (2024) – with various others
- Gakuen Idolmaster (2024) – "Chiisana Yabou"
- Code Vein II (2026)

=== Anime ===
- The Idolmaster (2011) – "Happy Christmas"
- Sakura no Ondo (2011)
- Gyo: Tokyo Fish Attack (2012)
- Kyousougiga (2013)
- Yoyo and Nene, the Little Witch Sisters (2013)
- In Search of the Lost Future (2014) – arrangement with Tomoki Kikuya and Akito Matsuda
- Tales of Zestiria: Dawn of the Shepherd (2014) – with Motoi Sakuraba
- God Eater (2015)
- Dimension W (2016) – with Yoshiaki Fujisawa
- Tales of Zestiria the X (2016) – with Motoi Sakuraba
- Juni Taisen: Zodiac War (2017)
- LayereD Stories 0 (2017)
- Fate/Grand Order x Himuro's World: Seven Most Powerful Great Figures Chapter (2017)
- Today's Menu for the Emiya Family (2018)
- Million Arthur (2018)
- Demon Slayer: Kimetsu no Yaiba (2019–present) – with Yuki Kajiura
- Demon Slayer: Kimetsu no Yaiba – The Movie: Mugen Train (2020) – with Yuki Kajiura
- Eien no 831 (2022)
- The Vexations of a Shut-In Vampire Princess (2023)
- Demon Slayer: Kimetsu no Yaiba – The Movie: Infinity Castle (2025) – with Yuki Kajiura
- Mobile Suit Gundam RG: XARX-ZERO (2027)

=== Other works ===
- THE iDOLM@STER RADIO Utahime Rakuen (2006) – "Gekkasai ~la festa sotto la luna~"
- Egoist (2006) – "ardore"
- THE iDOLM@STER MASTER ARTIST 07 Azusa Miura (2007) – "Tonari ni..."
- Echoes of War: The Music of Blizzard Entertainment (2008) – arranged "Eradicate and Evolve"
- THE iDOLM@STER MASTER ARTIST 2 -FIRST SEASON- 05 Chihaya Kisaragi (2010) – "Nemurihime"
- THE iDOLM@STER CINDERELLA MASTER 004 Kaede Takagaki (2012) – "Koi Kaze"
- Hasta La Vista / Asami Imai (2012) – "Hasta La Vista"
- Dear Darling / Asami Imai (2013) – "Tabibito"
- little legacy / Asami Imai (2014) – "little legacy"
- Words of GRACE / Asami Imai (2016) – "Aurora no Oto"
- THE iDOLM@STER CINDERELLA MASTER KOI KAZE -SAI- (2018)
- THE iDOLM@STER CINDERELLA GIRLS MASTER SEASONS SPRING! (2018) – "Mikansei no Rekishi"
- Flow of time / Asami Imai (2019) – "Kodoku na Ginga"
- THE IDOLM@STER CINDERELLA MASTER 055-057 Mirei Hayasaka, Hajime Fujiwara, Riamu Yumemi (2020) – "Arakane no Utsuwa"
- THE IDOLM@STER CINDERELLA MASTER 070-072 －COOL SELECTION－ (2025) – "Messiah"
