= Smash Tennis =

1993 video game

- European box art
- Developer: Namco
- Publishers: JP: Namco; PAL: Virgin Interactive
- Director: Hideo Yoshizawa
- Composer: Yoshinori Kawamoto
- Series: Family Tennis
- Platform: Super Nintendo Entertainment System
- Release: JP: June 25, 1993 (Note: Re-released on July 1, 1998 as part of the Nintendo Power peripheral.); PAL: 1994
- Genre: Sports (tennis)
- Modes: Single-player, multiplayer

Smash Tennis, released in Japan as Super Family Tennis, (Note: Japanese: スーパーファミリーテニス, Hepburn: Sūpā Famirī Tenisu) is a 1993 tennis video game developed and published by Namco for the Super Nintendo Entertainment System. It is a follow-up to Family Tennis. It was designed by Hideo Yoshizawa, a former employee of Tecmo that later created Klonoa: Door to Phantomile, Mr. Driller and R4: Ridge Racer Type 4. It did not receive a North American release until it was released on the Nintendo Classics service in February 2020.

== Gameplay ==
Smash Tennis is a tennis video game which can be played with up to four players simultaneously. They must hit the ball with the SNES controller; failing to do so will result in the announcer saying "fault!". After the maximum score is achieved, the court changes.

The Japanese version featured a hidden mode named "NAMCOT Theater", which is a story mode that was absent from the western release.

== Development and release ==
Super Family Tennis was released for the Super Nintendo Entertainment System in Japan on June 25, 1993. It was released in Europe later that year for the Super Nintendo Entertainment System, published by British developer Virgin Interactive and renamed to Smash Tennis. The game was designed by Hideo Yoshizawa, a former employee of Tecmo who is best known for creating Klonoa: Door to Phantomile, Mr. Driller, and R4: Ridge Racer Type 4; Super Family Tennis was the first game for Namco he worked on. Development of the game was done by Namcot, the former home console division of Namco that was later abolished in 1995. It is the sequel to Family Tennis, which was originally released in 1987 for the Family Computer in Japan. It was digitally re-released in Japan for the Nintendo Switch on September 6, 2019 and in the rest of the world on February 19, 2020 as one of twenty SNES titles announced for the Nintendo Classics service, making it the first time the game was released in the Americas.

== Reception ==
Reception

Review scores
Publication	Score
Computer and Video Games	90/100
Edge	7/10
Famitsu	8/10, 7/10, 7/10, 7/10
GamesMaster	89%
Hyper	76/100
Official Nintendo Magazine	92/100
Super Play	83%
Total!	(UK) 94% (DE) 1-
Dengeki Super Famicom	8/10, 8/10, 9/10, 9/10
Games World	81/100
Hippon Super!	8/10
Marukatsu Super Famicom	7/10, 7/10, 9/10, 7/10
Super Action	95%
Super Control	65%
The Super Famicom	70/100
Super Gamer	94/100
Super Pro	93/100

According to Famitsu, Smash Tennis sold 21,572 copies in its first week on the market and 83,213 copies during its lifetime in Japan. The game received generally favorable reviews from critics. In 1995, Total! ranked it as number 19 on its list of the top 100 SNES games. In 1996, Super Play also ranked the game as number 71 on its list of the top 100 SNES games.
