= QuickSpot =

2006 video game

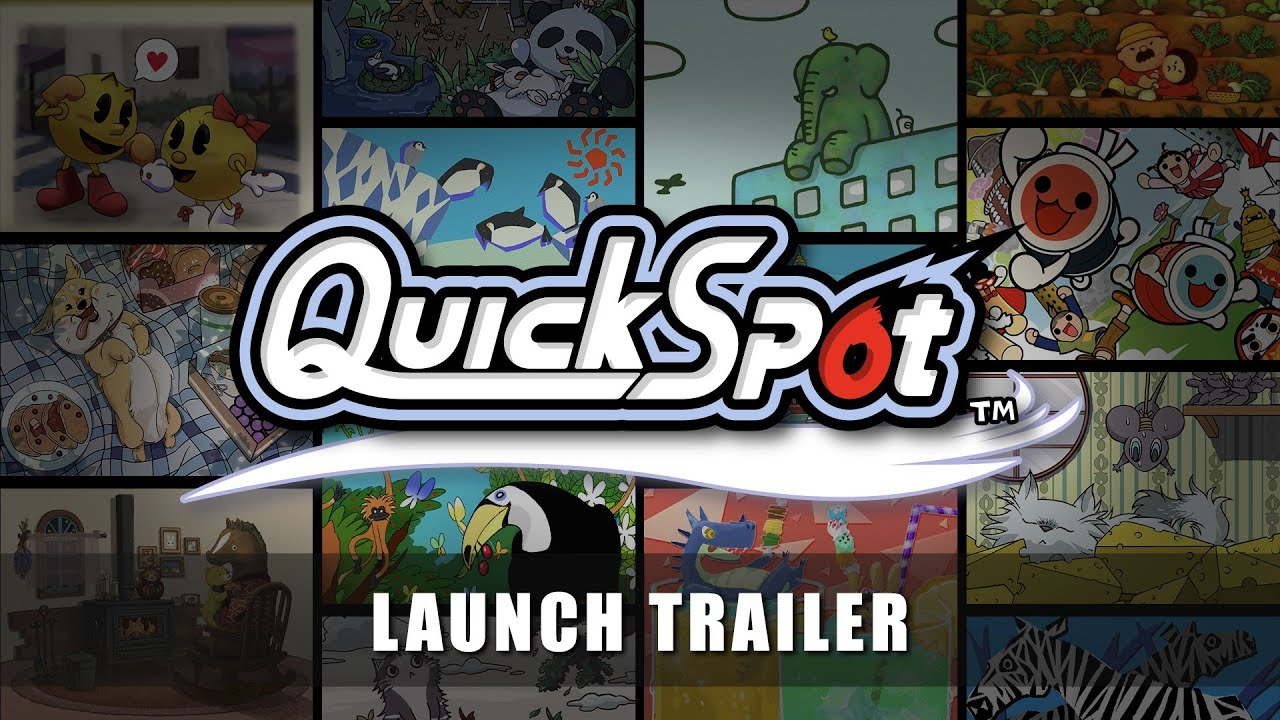
- Key art
- Developer: Namco
- Publishers: JP: Namco; WW: Namco Bandai Games
- Producer: Hideo Yoshizawa
- Series: Unō no Tatsujin
- Platforms: Nintendo DS, Nintendo Switch
- Release: JP: February 9, 2006; NA: March 19, 2007; Nintendo Switch: JP: April 22, 2021; NA: January 6, 2022
- Genre: Puzzle
- Modes: Single-player, multiplayer

QuickSpot (Note: Known in Japan as Unō no Tatsujin: Sayaka Kai! Machigai Museum (右脳の達人 爽解！まちがいミュージアム, Unō no Tatsujin: Sayaka Kai! Machigai Myūjiamu; Right-Brain Master: Refreshing! Mistake Museum)) is a puzzle video game developed and published by Namco for the Nintendo DS. It is one of the last games to be released by Namco, whose successor Namco Bandai Games would release it internationally. the first in the Unō no Tatsujin series. A sequel, titled Unou no Tatsujin Soukai! Machigai Museum 2, was released exclusively in Japan on March 1, 2007. An updated port of the game, titled QuickSpot: Master of the Right Brain, was developed by Bandai Namco Studios and published by Bandai Namco Entertainment for Nintendo Switch. It was released on April 22, 2021, in Japan and on January 6, 2022, in the west.

Trailer for the Nintendo Switch version

== Gameplay ==
The game projects two images, the correct one on the top screen, and an error filled one on the bottom screen. Comparing the two images, the player has to locate and find the inaccuracies or changes from the top screen to the touch screen. Sometimes the player has to find the unused puzzle piece or part.

This game is based on the traditional game spot the difference. GamePro.com described the game "like a mix between Where's Waldo and the Hidden Pictures section in Highlights magazine".

The players use none of the face buttons or D-Pad on the DS. The entire game is played using the touch screen and stylus. The player draws a circle using the stylus when the player spots the differences between the top image on the bottom screen. In some instances, the built in microphone is used.

This game has 3 modes each for single player and multiplayer. Single player has 3 modes: Rapid Play, Focus Play, and Today's Fortune. Multiplayer has 3 modes: Time Bomb, Scramble, and Download Play. In the main stages of Rapid Play, there is 1 difference, except in some special stages. Special stages are unlocked by earning medals, the first medal unlocks "Animation". The 50th medal unlocks "Story".

Focus Play has 10 differences in 140 puzzles, of which 50 are unlocked from the start. After completing all available puzzles, 10 more are unlocked. If 3 mistakes are made in a puzzle, then it's game over. The amount of differences remaining are indicated by the frowns at the bottom right corner. After a difference is found, a frown will smile.

Today's Fortune has 5 differences in 5 images and after circling a difference in an image, it advances to the next image. There are 4 fortune types: Health, Study/Work, Romance and Money. The game will give a fortune from 0–5 after completing all images. These fortunes can be viewed once a day.

Time Bomb involves up to 8 players circling the difference so they can pass the system to the next player. Sometimes "reverse" and "skip" prompts show up. When the bomb explodes, the player with the DS loses.

== Development and release ==
It was announced on the website GoNintendo that the game would be localized for North America, and was released on March 19, 2007, 13 months after the Japanese launch. An early review of this game on GameSpot gave it a score of 6.3. The North American version also adds references to other Namco franchises like Pac-Man, Mappy, and Mr. Driller.
