= Trioncube =

2006 video game

- North American cover art
- Developer: Namco Bandai Games
- Publisher: Namco Bandai Games (Note: Released under the Namco brand outside North America)
- Producer: Hideo Yoshizawa
- Designer: Kouji Asuna
- Composer: Ryuichi Takada
- Platform: Nintendo DS
- Release: JP: August 3, 2006; NA: February 20, 2007; EU: June 8, 2007
- Genre: Puzzle
- Modes: Single-player, multiplayer

Trioncube (Note: Japanese: 気持ちよさ連鎖パズル トリオンキューブ, Hepburn: Kimochiyo-sa Rensa Pazuru Torionkyūbu; lit. Comfortable Chain Puzzle Trion Cube) is a puzzle video game developed by Namco Bandai Games and released for the Nintendo DS. It follows The Captain, sole pilot of the penguin-shaped spaceship Penko, in his pursuit of the princess captured by the evil Hell Metal and King Pluto.

== Gameplay ==
Trioncube consists of 45 levels and four different game modes, each of which has the player moving their ship toward an end goal by combining trominoes (a la Tetris' tetrominoes) into overlapping 3x3 squares, referred to in-game as cubes. Creating cubes in succession starts a combo, which ends either when a certain time passes without placing a block or a block is placed that fails to form a new 3x3 cube. This moves the ship a distance forward depending on the size of the combo, completing the level if the end goal is reached before the timer runs out. Ending a combo produces coins, which can be used to unlock various in-game graphics and sound effects.

The game features four modes:

- Story mode is 45 levels and features cutscenes as well as gold, silver, and bronze completion times for each level.
- Arcade is a continuous level that progressively increases in difficulty.
- Endless is a game mode with 99 levels.
- VS allows players to compete against a computer or one another via DS Download Play.

== Development ==
Trioncube was developed by Namco Bandai Games. The game was chiefly designed by Kouji Asuna and was produced by Hideo Yoshizawa, known for his work on the Mr. Driller series of puzzle games. The idea for the game came to Asuna while he was at home, watching television after a bath. He had been working on a separate puzzle game at the time and was stuck on how to bring the project together. "Something just clicked in my head as soon as this certain shape appeared on the screen," he explained. "That was the moment Trioncube started to [materialize] in my head." Asuna wanted to make Trioncube unique by emphasizing large combos rather than clearing lines. Asuna considered utilizing the DS touchscreen for moving blocks, but chose not to because "it didn't really feel natural or make things easier". The game's "cute" aesthetic was also intentional, evolving from a more basic interface to one the design team hoped would appeal to both younger and female players.

Prior to its release, an Adobe Flash demo version of the game could be played on both the English and Japanese Bandai Namco websites. The Japanese site also hosted special promotional content for the game, including commercials, wallpapers, and an official manga featuring the game's development team.

== Reception ==
Reception

Aggregate score
Aggregator	Score
Metacritic	55/100

Review scores
Publication	Score
Edge	5/10
Eurogamer	5/10
Famitsu	25/40
Game Informer	6/10
GameSpot	5.3/10
GameZone	6/10
IGN	5.5/10
Nintendo Life	8/10
Nintendo Power	5.5/10
Nintendo World Report	4.5/10
Pocket Gamer	2.5/5

The game received "mixed" reviews according to the review aggregation website Metacritic. It was said to be far too easy, with the slow pace of the game giving a lack of challenge and making it dull. ONM mentioned that the game was not as addictive as Tetris, and there were better puzzle games on the DS. In Japan, Famitsu gave it a score of 25 out of 40. GamePro said, "In the end, Trioncube doesn't offer much for a puzzle game. There's little depth or difficulty to be found, and while the odd story is surprisingly entertaining, it isn't enough to keep you playing for long." (Note: GamePro gave the game 3.75/5 for graphics, two 3.5.5 scores for sound and control, and 2.5/5 for fun factor.)
