= Muscle March =

2009 video game

- Developer: Namco Bandai Games
- Publisher: Namco Bandai Games (Note: Published under the Namco brand outside North America.)
- Producer: Shinya Satake
- Platform: Wii
- Release: JP: May 26, 2009; NA: January 18, 2010; PAL: March 19, 2010
- Genre: Action
- Modes: Single-player, multiplayer

Muscle March, known in Japan as Muscle Kōshinkyoku (Note: Japanese: マッスル行進曲, Hepburn: Massuru Kōshinkyoku), is an action game developed and published by Namco Bandai Games for the Wii through the WiiWare service. It was released in Japan in 2009, and in North America and the PAL region in 2010. Players control one of seven different bodybuilders and try to catch a thief that has stolen their bodybuilding friends' tub of protein powder. Its gameplay is similar to Hole In The Wall, where players use the Wiimote and Nunchuck to perform specific bodybuilder poses to pass through corresponding holes in walls left by the thief.

Muscle March is based on an unreleased arcade game of the same name, where players used a set of dual joysticks to make a character perform various poses. The arcade version was developed by a team of newcomers to the company and was canceled due to it being too similar to "another arcade game at the time". Company veteran Hideo Yoshizawa suggested porting Muscle March to the Wii as he believed its motion controls worked well with the game. Critics highlighted its bizarre nature and camp style, which they compared to games such as Namco Bandai's sister franchise Katamari Damacy, though its gameplay was criticized for being too simplistic and suffering from unresponsive controls.

== Gameplay ==
A screenshot of Muscle March, showing the player (as Mr. Pedroso) performing the same pose as the hole.

Muscle March is an action game in which players control a bodybuilder trying to stop a thief that has stolen their bodybuilding friends' tub of protein powder. Players can select one of seven different flamboyant characters, which include the Russian Radimov; the top hat-wearing Spaniard, Mr. Pedroso; and a Norwegian polar bear. The differences between each character are cosmetic, and do not affect the gameplay itself depending on which one is chosen.

The gameplay is similar to Hole In The Wall; the thief will crash through walls, leaving holes in the shape of bodybuilding poses, and players use the Wiimote and Nunchuck to match the pose. Failing to match the pose in time will remove a heart from the players' stamina meter. If the meter is fully depleted, the game is over. Players begin at the end of a single-file line of computer-controlled bodybuilders, which one by one are knocked out of play. Once the thief is the only character remaining, players must shake the controllers to catch up and tackle him. The main gamemode is "Arcade", where players complete a series of six stages that increase in difficulty. There is also a time attack mode where the objective is to get as far as possible before a life is lost.

== Development ==
Muscle March was created by Namco Bandai Games, a company formed through the merger of Namco and Bandai in 2006. It was originally intended as an arcade game where players used a set of dual joysticks for control. The arcade version was created in 2006 by a team of newcomer employees for the company, who were given exactly one month to make it as a learning experience. They came up with a game where players use the joysticks to make the character perform different poses. Though the prototype was completed and later demonstrated at an arcade tradeshow in Tokyo, it was canceled before its test marketing due to it being too similar to "another arcade game at the time".

The same year the arcade version of Muscle March was canceled, Nintendo released the Wii, a home game console that utilized motion controls. Hideo Yoshizawa, a long-time veteran of Namco Bandai and the producer of its Klonoa series, suggested releasing Muscle March for the Wii, as it was his belief the motion controls would work well with the game. Yoshizawa showed the game to Nintendo, who reportedly liked its concept. The Wii version was produced by newcomer Shinya Satake. Muscle March's characters, setting, and plot rarely attempt any semblance of realism, in a manner similar to Katamari Damacy (2004) and Noby Noby Boy (2009). This design choice was based on Satake wanting to make games with a comedic tone.

Namco Bandai released Muscle March in Japan on May 26, 2009 through the WiiWare service. Though news outlets believed its heavily-stylized and bizarre design made an international version unlikely, Namco Bandai announced a Western release in December. Namco Bandai's North American division worked to promote the game using strange and eccentric advertisements, which generated considerable attention. Muscle March was released in North America on January 10, 2010, and later for the PAL region on March 19.

== Reception ==
Reception

Aggregate score
| Aggregator | Score |
|---|---|
| Metacritic | 62/100 |

Review scores
| Publication | Score |
|---|---|
| 1Up.com | D |
| The A.V. Club | D− |
| Eurogamer | 7/10 |
| Gamekult | 4/10 |
| GamesRadar+ | 3.5/5 |
| IGN | 6.1/10 |
| MeriStation | 6/10 |
| NGamer | 60% |
| Nintendo Life | 6/10 |
| Official Nintendo Magazine | 63% |

Muscle March received "mixed" reviews according to the review aggregation website Metacritic. IGN reviewer Daemon Hatfield considered Muscle March "more fun to watch than it is to play". Reviewers were primarily critical of its controls, which they claimed became unresponsive in later portions of the game. Kotaku writer Michael McWhertor expressed his frustration with the game not being able to recognize controller movements at high speeds, making later levels unnecessarily difficult. Nathan Meunier of GamesRadar+, though not as critical as McWhertor, felt the controls required time getting used to, and listed it as being one of Muscle March's weakest aspects. The short length and lack of content were also criticized. Writing for MeriStation, Ramon Mendez thought the game was too short and lacked a proper challenge, and wrote that Muscle March was "nothing more than a curiosity".

Critics were drawn to the camp style and bizarre premise. Hardcore Gaming 101's Neil Foster described the game as being "a homoerotic Simon Says." Its lack of attempt at realism was compared to games such as Cho Aniki and Katamari Damacy, which similarly used abstract characters and outlandish premises. Mendez and McWhertor both suggested playing the game with friends for the same reason. Foster complained the graphics were on-par with budget-priced Dreamcast games, while Hatfield felt it added to its charm. The gameplay itself left reviewers indifferent; where as some stated it was too simplistic, others believed it was part of what made it appealing. Eurogamer's Ellie Gibson said its simplicity and strangeness were its biggest strengths, and ultimately made it worth the purchase: "Muscle March is shallow, stupid, short, repetitive and crude. It's also the best WiiWare game."
