= Echoes of War =

Music from the video game series World of Warcraft, StarCraft, and Diablo

Echoes of War is a Blizzard Entertainment-produced orchestral version of the music from their three most popular video game series, World of Warcraft, StarCraft, and Diablo. It includes previously unreleased theme music from StarCraft II: Wings of Liberty, Diablo III, and World of Warcraft: Wrath of the Lich King.

The album went on sale on November 1, 2008, with the Standard Edition at $29.95 and the Legend Collector's Edition priced at $49.95. The Standard version includes 15 tracks. In addition, the Legend Collector's Edition also contains an extra DVD, which includes behind-the-scenes content including Japanese composer Kow Otani talking about work on Diablo III, as well as a 32-page color booklet and nine exclusive postcards.

== Creative process ==
The album was inspired by previous iTunes sales of World of Warcraft music tracks. The track received much unexpected support from players, so Blizzard Entertainment worked to create an album of music.

Eminence Symphony Orchestra is responsible for the production. They invited several composers in the games' soundtracks, including Blizzard Entertainment's Music Director, Russell Brower, and Go Shiina from Namco Bandai Games.

== Track list ==
Echoes of War (Disc I) (35:14)

1. Journey to Kalimdor (4:06)
2. Eternity's End (2:41)
3. A Tenuous Pact (7:41)
4. Anar' alah Belore (5:14)
5. The Betrayer and The Sun King (6:51)
6. The Visions of the Lich King Overture (8:41)

Echoes of War (Disc II) (54:32)

1. No Matter the Cost (5:42)
2. En Taro Adun (4:07)
3. Eradicate and Evolve (6:33)
4. Victorious but not Unscarred (5:15)
5. The Hyperion Overture (5:18)
6. The Eternal Conflict (6:35)
7. Legacy of Terror (5:26)
8. Children of the Worldstone (7:54)
9. Last Angel (BONUS) (7:42)
