= Dig Dug: Digging Strike =

2005 video game

- North American box art
- Developers: Bullets; Namco
- Publishers: JP: Namco; NA: Namco Hometek; EU: Atari Europe
- Designers: Yuta Hamaka; Teruyuki Shirakawa
- Series: Dig Dug
- Platform: Nintendo DS
- Release: JP: September 8, 2005; NA: October 19, 2005; PAL: August 25, 2006
- Genre: Maze
- Modes: Single-player, multiplayer

Dig Dug: Digging Strike (Note: Japanese: ディグダグ ディギング ストライク, Hepburn: Digu Dagu Digingu Sutoraiku) is a 2005 maze video game developed and published by Namco for the Nintendo DS. In Europe, the game was published by Atari Europe. It is the fifth entry in the Dig Dug series, and the second to be made for a handheld, following New Dig Dug. The game follows series protagonist Taizo Hori, bitter about his son Susumu getting more attention than him. After a chain of tropical islands is threatened by monsters, Taizo sets out to defeat them and reclaim his fame. Gameplay combines mechanics established in the original Dig Dug and its sequel Dig Dug II, centered around sinking a large "boss" character into the ocean by digging under large stakes in the ground.

Development of the game was outsourced to independent Japanese studio Bullets, who worked on the Hero Bank series for Sega, and designed by both Yuta Hamaka and Truyuki Shirakawa. It was one of six games published by both Namco Bandai and Atari as part of an exclusive publishing deal in Europe. Digging Strike was met with mixed reviews upon release—critics disliked the game's short length and lack of both replay value and long-lasting appeal, although would praise its usage of collectibles and references to other Namco arcade games. Some also praised its gameplay for combining elements found in the first two entries.

== Gameplay ==
In-game screenshot. The top shows the boss character and island, while the bottom displays the player, enemies and stakes.

Dig Dug: Digging Strike is a maze video game that combines elements from the first two games in the series: Dig Dug (1982) and Dig Dug II (1985). Controlling Taizo Hori, the player must complete each of the game's fifteen stages by sinking a large boss character, displayed on the top screen, into the ocean. This is accomplished by digging underneath large stakes placed underground; lining up stakes will create massive fault lines that will cause a section of the island to break off and sink underwater. Taizo starts each stage on the island, and can travel underground by entering large holes placed around the stage.

While underground, Taizo will need to fend off different types of enemies. Alongside the return of Pookas and Fygars from the original Dig Dug, new enemy types have also been introduced, such as ghosts that phase through dirt, penguins and miniature octopuses. Enemies can be defeated by pumping them up full of air until they pop, or by having them collide with obstacles, such as falling rocks, lava pockets and quicksand. Placed throughout the underground sections are items that can help Taizo progress—these include large magnets, time-stopping clocks, and boxing gloves that can be shot at enemies. The player can also collect fossils throughout the game, which when all are found will unlock a special bonus stage.

Some power-ups will summon Susumu that will either automatically force a stake into a ground via a weight being dropped on them, or temporarily stun the boss character. Unlike other items, a minigame will need to be completed for the intended effect to occur, where the player takes control of Susumu and must perform certain tasks—some of these are based on other Namco video games, including Xevious and Rally-X. Some stages will contain parts that can be used to construct more powerful weapons when collected, such as a faster drill. Food can also be found underground, which can be collected by enemies and brought up to the boss to transform it into a more powerful version of itself.

== Development and release ==
Development of Dig Dug: Digging Strike was outsourced to external studio Bullets, which has worked on titles such as the Hero Bank series for Sega and Mega Man Legacy Collection 2 for Capcom. Designed by Yuta Hamaka and Teruyuki Shirakawa, Digging Strike's concept was borrowed from the unreleased Dig Dug 3, an arcade game in development at Namco in the late 1990s that was later reworked into the original Mr. Driller (1999). The game was part of Namco's continuing attempt in making its Dig Dug and Mr. Driller series part of the company's pillar franchises, an idea hampered by financial constraints and a general lack of interest. Famitsu revealed the game's development in June 2005, being reportedly 80% complete. Namco published the game in Japan on September 8 and in North America on October 19. Digging Strike was released in Europe on August 25, 2006 and was part of a six game licensing partnership between the newly-formed Namco Bandai Games and Atari Europe.

== Reception ==
Reception

Aggregate score
Aggregator	Score
Metacritic	65/100

Review scores
Publication	Score
1Up.com	B
Famitsu	31/40
GameSpot	6/10
GameSpy	3.5/5
IGN	6.5/10
Nintendo World Report	5/10

Dig Dug Digging Strike received mixed reviews upon release—common criticisms were towards its short length and lack of long-lasting appeal. It holds a 65/100 on aggregator website Metacritic.

IGN said that the game was only fun for a few minutes, feeling it was not as creative as Namco's other DS remakes such as Pac-Pix and Pac 'N Roll, only recommending the game to die-hard fans of the original. Similar responses were echoed by GameSpot and GameSpy, with GameSpot in particular criticizing it for straying too far from its source material. Nintendo World Report was the most critical, saying the game itself is disappointing compared to the first two Dig Dug games and makes the player "wish you were playing those instead", disliking its short length and lack of content. IGN was also critical towards the game's "sloppy" presentation and "bland" in-game cutscenes, as well as the game's multiplayer requiring two game cartridges to play. Nintendo World Report criticized its control layout for being difficult to use, while GameSpot disliked the game's lack of touch-screen features.

Despite its criticisms, reviewers praised the game's mixture of the first two Dig Dug games, collectibles and references to other Namco games. Nintendo World Report said its usage of gameplay from earlier Dig Dug games was an interesting concept, which IGN, GameSpy and 1UP.com agreed with. 1UP in particular was the most positive towards the game, praising its "addictive" gameplay, enemy variety and its usage of concepts from other Dig Dug games, saying that it helps "celebrate" the legacy of the series. IGN, GameSpot and GameSpy all liked the game's usage of callbacks to other Namco video games and large amount of collectible items. While IGN said the game's graphics were unappealing to look at, GameSpy contested this, praising its cartoony art style and anime-style cutscenes. Famitsu awarded the game the "Silver Hall of Fame" badge.
