= GameCube–Game Boy Advance link cable =

Accessory for GameCube and Game Boy Advance

GameCube – Game Boy Advance link cable
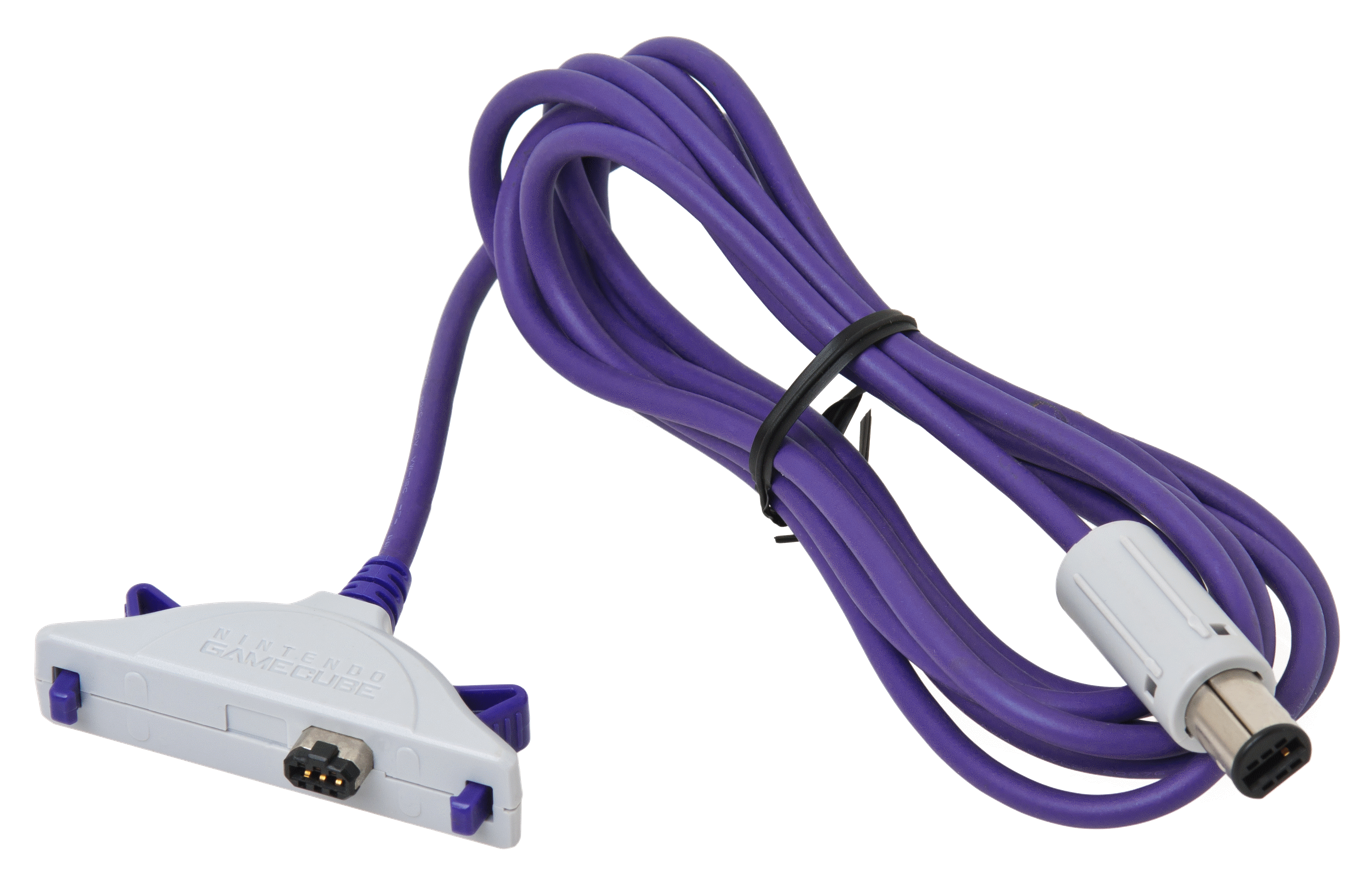
- Also known as: DOL-011
- Manufacturer: Nintendo
- Type: Gamepad adapter cable
- Generation: Sixth
- Released: JP: December 14, 2001; NA: February 2002
- Connectivity: GameCube controller port, Game Boy Advance

The GameCube Game Boy Advance cable is a video game accessory manufactured by Nintendo which is used to connect the Game Boy Advance (GBA) handheld console to the GameCube (GCN) home console. Depending on the games it is used with, the cable may facilitate transferring data between related games, unlocking additional content, or turning the GBA into a controller or second screen. The accessory is compatible with over 60 GameCube games.

== History ==
The concept of a cable that allowed for the transfer of data and second-screen gameplay was originally conceived for the Nintendo 64 as the "64 GB Cable", a device designed by Marigul Management which would allow certain Nintendo 64DD games to connect to a Game Boy Color. However, the device was never released—interactivity between Nintendo 64 and Game Boy games was limited to those that supported the Transfer Pak, released in 1998.

== Functionality ==
The cable has one end that plugs into a GameCube controller slot and another end that plugs into the GBA's extension port. The cable is compatible with the GameCube and Wii (Note: New Wii units released from 2011 onward lack support for GameCube games and accessories, making the cable incompatible.) on the console side; and the Game Boy Advance, Game Boy Advance SP, Game Boy Player, and e-Reader on the portable side. When used with the Game Boy Player accessory, the Game Boy Advance system can be used to control any Game Boy game played through the GameCube.

Because the Game Boy Micro has a differently-shaped link port, the official cable does not work with it, but enthusiasts have been able to hack together homemade versions which do. The cable is also incompatible with the Nintendo DS family, as the original Nintendo DS and DS Lite's backwards compatibility for the Game Boy Advance does not extend to its accessories, lacking the necessary extension port.

In July 2021, the team behind the GameCube emulator Dolphin announced the integration of the Game Boy Advance emulator mGBA into the program, allowing a Game Boy Advance emulator to run within Dolphin simultaneously to simulate GameCube-GBA connectivity. In addition to supporting transfer of data to and from emulated GBA titles, up to four Game Boy Advance instances can be simultaneously active in Dolphin at once, making multiplayer in games that require the GBA such as The Legend of Zelda: Four Swords Adventures and Final Fantasy Crystal Chronicles viable within Dolphin locally and via netplay. In contrast, GBA connectivity is not available in Nintendo's official GameCube emulator for the Nintendo Classics service on Nintendo Switch 2.

=== Supported games ===
The following is a list of 63 compatible GameCube games, with the corresponding Game Boy Advance (GBA) game if applicable. Games which optionally support a GBA game but do not require it are marked accordingly.

List of games compatible with the GameCube – Game Boy Advance link cable
GameCube game	Game Boy Advance game	Features
All-Star Baseball 2004	All-Star Baseball 2004	Trading cards can be transferred between both versions.
Amazing Island	—N/a	Players can access a playable card game on the GBA, through which they can unlock items for GameCube.
Animal Crossing	(e-Reader optional)	The GBA is used as a second screen to design patterns, to access a secret island and/or play a virtual pet style mini-game with the islander, and to play downloadable NES games. When connected to the e-Reader, it allows scanning compatible cards for bonus items, patterns, and town tunes. The e-Reader support is absent in the European version.
Batman: Rise of Sin Tzu	Batman: Rise of Sin Tzu	Connecting the two games unlocks special modes on the GBA version, but these cannot be saved and must be re-unlocked each time by reconnecting. The GBA link option is absent in the European version.
Billy Hatcher and the Giant Egg	—N/a	Special minigames based on ChuChu Rocket!, Nights into Dreams, and Puyo Pop can be unlocked and downloaded to the GBA.
Bobobo-bo Bo-bobo: Dassutsu! Hajike Royale	(Bobobo-bo Bo-bobo: Bakutou Hajike Taisen optional)	Players can download and play minigames from the GBA Bobobo-bo Bo-bobo games. Connecting to Bakutou Hajike Taisen unlocks secret techniques in both games.
Bomberman Land 2	—N/a	A set of 10 minigames can be downloaded to the GBA.
Crash Bandicoot: The Wrath of Cortex	—N/a	A secret minigame, called "Crash Blast", can be played on the GBA.
Crash Nitro Kart	Crash Nitro Kart	Connecting the two versions will unlock three characters (N. Oxide, N. Tropy & Spyro) and all four cheats in the GBA game; these bonuses can also be unlocked through normal gameplay. It also unlocks a dancing minigame on GBA.
Dakar 2: The World's Ultimate Rally	—N/a	Players can download a set of top-down racing challenges to GBA.
Disney Sports Basketball	Disney Sports Basketball	Power-ups can be transferred from the GBA to the GCN version.
Disney Sports Soccer	Disney Sports Soccer	Power-ups can be transferred from the GBA to the GCN version.
Disney's Magical Mirror Starring Mickey Mouse	Disney's Magical Quest Starring Mickey and Minnie	Items can be transferred from Magical Quest to Magical Mirror.
FIFA Football 2004	(FIFA Football 2004 optional)	The GBA can be used as a virtual scoreboard during gameplay. Connecting the two games will also unlock special tournaments in both versions.
Final Fantasy Crystal Chronicles	—N/a	A GBA is required for each player in the multiplayer mode. Each player can control their character and access an individual menu, without interrupting gameplay.
Fire Emblem: Path of Radiance	Fire Emblem: The Binding Blade, Fire Emblem: The Blazing Blade, Fire Emblem: The Sacred Stones	Each GBA game will unlock additional artwork and a different map in Path of Radiance.
Harry Potter and the Chamber of Secrets	(Harry Potter and the Chamber of Secrets optional)	Players can download a slide-puzzle game when no GBA cartridge is present. Connecting both versions opens secret areas in both games to unlock special items.
Harry Potter and the Prisoner of Azkaban	(Harry Potter and the Prisoner of Azkaban optional)	Players can download minigames to GBA when no game is connected. The GBA version will unlock an "Owl Care Kit" when connected.
Harry Potter: Quidditch World Cup	Harry Potter: Quidditch World Cup	Connecting the two games allows for co-op play, with the GBA controlling the seeker.
Harvest Moon: A Wonderful Life	Harvest Moon: Friends of Mineral Town	Characters in each game will travel to the other game and bring back special items.
Harvest Moon: Another Wonderful Life	Harvest Moon: More Friends of Mineral Town	Characters in each game will travel to the other game and bring back special items.
Hikaru no Go 3	Hikaru no Go 3 Exclusive Joy Carry Cartridge	A rewritable "Joy Carry" cartridge is packaged with the game. Connecting to it will allow the player to download a series of single player Go puzzles or a portable Go board for multiplayer play.
Hot Wheels: Velocity X	Hot Wheels: Velocity X	Connecting the two games unlocks additional racers in each version.
James Bond 007: Everything or Nothing	James Bond 007: Everything or Nothing	The GBA will provide statistics and hints for the current area in the GameCube version.
Korokke! Ban-Ō no Kiki o Sukue	Korokke! 3: Guranyū Ōkoku no Nazo	The GBA can be used as a radar to locate hidden items. Connecting the two games also unlocks Burger in Korokke! 3.
Kururin Squash!	—N/a	A memory match minigame can be downloaded to the GBA.
The Legend of Zelda: Four Swords Adventures	—N/a	The GBA can be used as the controller instead of the GameCube controller for single player. Multiplayer cooperative play can also be enabled with up to four players, but a separate GBA and cable is required for each player.
The Legend of Zelda: The Wind Waker	—N/a	When connected to GBA, optional two-player cooperative play can be enabled using the in-game Tingle Tuner.
The Lord of the Rings: The Return of the King	The Lord of the Rings: The Return of the King	Connecting the two games unlocks Sam Gamgee as a playable character and other additional features on GameCube.
Madden NFL 2003	Madden NFL 2003	The GBA can be used as an interactive scoreboard.
Madden NFL 2004	Madden NFL 2004	The GBA can be used as an interactive scoreboard, and unlocks additional GameCube features. The GBA link option is absent in the European GameCube version because the GBA version was not released in Europe.
Mario Golf: Toadstool Tour	Mario Golf: Advance Tour	Players can transfer their Advance Tour player characters between games to earn experience in gameplay. Luigi, Waluigi, Wario and Bowser are also unlocked in Advance Tour.
Mario Kart Double Dash Bonus Disc	Fire Emblem: The Blazing Blade	Connecting to Fire Emblem unlocks 15 exclusive items that can only be obtained from the bonus disc, as well as two additional soundtrack entries. In Japan, these items were instead distributed through "Monthly Nintendo" demo kiosks. The GBA link option is absent in the European version of Fire Emblem, since the Bonus Disc was not released in Europe.
Medabots Infinity	Medabots: Metabee and Rokusho	Connecting to the GBA games unlocks two secret characters and additional parts in Infinity. The GBA link option is absent in the European version.
Medal of Honor: Rising Sun	Medal of Honor: Infiltrator	A map of the current level will be displayed on the Game Boy Advance.
Mega Man X: Command Mission	—N/a	The GBA can be used to find hidden items and unlock additional figures.
Metroid Prime	Metroid Fusion	Connecting the two games unlocks a Fusion Suit costume and an emulation of Metroid on NES in Prime.
Mr. Driller: Drill Land	Mr. Driller A	The player can transfer their Pacteria digital pets between games.
NASCAR Thunder 2003	—N/a	During races, players can use the GBA to manage data on the player's car (fuel, damage, tires), and view realtime telemetry data and current race standings.
Nintendo GameCube Preview Disc	—N/a	Demos of WarioWare, Inc.: Mega Microgame$! and Dr. Mario can be played on GBA.
Nintendo Puzzle Collection	—N/a	The GBA can be used as a controller. Players can also download the NES versions of Dr. Mario and Yoshi's Cookie along with a GBA port of Panel de Pon.
One Piece Grand Battle! 3	—N/a	Connecting to the GBA unlocks a set of mini-games and a playable demo of the GBA game One Piece: Going Baseball (2004).
Pac-Man Vs.	—N/a	A GBA is required to play. Three players play as the ghosts hunting down Pac-Man, with normal controllers looking at the TV screen; the fourth player controls Pac-Man on the GBA and can see the whole map. Only when the player is Pac-Man can they score points.
Phantasy Star Online Episode I & II series	—N/a	Minigames based on ChuChu Rocket!, Nights into Dreams, and Puyo Pop can be downloaded to the GBA. The game also includes a special version of the Tiny Chao Garden, which players can use to import a Tails Chao into Sonic Adventure DX or Sonic Adventure 2: Battle.
Pikmin 2	e-Reader	Using special e-Reader cards, players can unlock and play minigames on a Game Boy Advance connected to the GameCube. Only available in Japan.
Pokémon Box: Ruby and Sapphire	Pokémon Ruby and Sapphire, Pokémon Emerald, Pokémon FireRed and LeafGreen	Players can transfer their Pokémon from the GBA games to Box for storage. A connected copy of Pokémon Ruby or Pokémon Sapphire can also be emulated on the television, similar to the Game Boy Player. If the game is connected by using the Adventure mode and has the Berry Glitch, it will patch the glitch and display a message on saving.
Pokémon Channel	Pokémon Ruby and Sapphire, e-Reader	Using special e-Reader cards, players can receive special line art for coloring. In European and Australian versions of the game, players can unlock a downloadable Jirachi to put into Pokémon Ruby or Sapphire. This downloadable Jirachi patches the Berry Glitch present in these games.
Pokémon Colosseum	Pokémon Ruby and Sapphire, Pokémon Emerald, Pokémon FireRed and LeafGreen, e-Reader	Pokémon can be transferred between Colosseum and the GBA games, and battles can be held in Colosseum using the GBA to issue orders. If the players are using Ruby or Sapphire to connect, it will also patch the Berry Glitch present in these games. Preordered copies came with a bonus disc that included a Celebi (Japan) or Jirachi (US) available for download. Downloading Jirachi from the US bonus disc also fixes the Berry Glitch. In the Japanese version, a set of e-Reader cards will also unlock additional battles, allowing players to capture three additional Shadow Pokémon.
Pokémon XD: Gale of Darkness	Pokémon Ruby and Sapphire, Pokémon Emerald, Pokémon FireRed and LeafGreen	Pokémon can be transferred between XD and the GBA games, and battles can be held in XD using the GBA to issue orders. If the players are using Ruby or Sapphire to connect, it will also patch the Berry Glitch present in these games.
Prince of Persia: The Sands of Time	Prince of Persia: The Sands of Time	Connecting the two versions unlocks a "health restore" function and an emulation of the original Prince of Persia game on GameCube.
Rayman 3: Hoodlum Havoc	(Rayman 3: Hoodlum Havoc optional)	Connecting to a GBA unlocks three special multiplayer minigames, with players on GBA and GameCube working cooperatively. The GBA version will also unlock several additional levels when connected to the GameCube.
Road Trip: The Arcade Edition	Road Trip: Shifting Gears	Connecting both games unlocks additional tracks in each one. The GBA can also be used as a controller in Arcade Edition.
The Sims: Bustin' Out	(The Sims Bustin' Out optional)	Players will unlock a furniture item that allows them to play minigames on GBA to earn Simoleons. Sims can also be transferred between versions.
Sonic Adventure 2: Battle	(Sonic Advance, Sonic Advance 2 or Sonic Pinball Party optional)	A player's Chao can be transferred to the Tiny Chao Garden minigame on GBA, similar to Chao Adventure 2 for VMU. If one of the GBA games is connected, the Chao can be saved to that game's Tiny Chao Garden.
Sonic Adventure DX: Director's Cut	(Sonic Advance, Sonic Advance 2 or Sonic Pinball Party optional)	A player's Chao can be transferred to the Tiny Chao Garden minigame on GBA, similar to Chao Adventure for VMU. If one of the GBA games is connected, the Chao can be saved to that game's Tiny Chao Garden.
SSX 3	SSX 3	Cash can be transferred between the GBA and GCN versions.
Star Wars Rogue Squadron III: Rebel Strike	—N/a	The GBA can be used to issue wingman orders privately in Versus mode.
Tiger Woods PGA Tour 2004	Tiger Woods PGA Tour 2004	Connecting both versions unlocks additional cosmetics on GameCube, and an additional golfer and course on GBA. Player stats and cash can also be transferred between versions.
Tom Clancy's Splinter Cell	(Tom Clancy's Splinter Cell optional)	The GBA can be used as a mini map/radar for the GCN version. Additional levels for the GBA version will also be unlocked when connected.
Tom Clancy's Splinter Cell: Chaos Theory	—N/a	The GBA can be used as a mini map/radar.
Tom Clancy's Splinter Cell: Pandora Tomorrow	(Tom Clancy's Splinter Cell: Pandora Tomorrow optional)	The GBA can be used as a mini map/radar for the GCN version. Additional levels for the GBA version will also be unlocked when connected.
Wario World	—N/a	The player can send demos of WarioWare, Inc.: Mega Microgame$! to the GBA.
WarioWare, Inc.: Mega Party Game$!	—N/a	The GBA can be used as a controller.

Support for the accessory was also planned for Donkey Kong Plus, Roll-O-Rama, and Stage Debut, though none of these games were ever released. Other games, such as Metal Gear Solid: The Twin Snakes, were originally intended to feature connectivity, but dropped the feature during development.

== See also ==
- Transfer Pak
- Game Boy Player
