= Mr. Driller G =

2001 video game

- Promotional artwork
- Developer: Namco (Project Driller)
- Publisher: Namco
- Director: Yasuhito Nagaoka
- Producer: Hideo Yoshizawa
- Designer: Yasuhito Nagaoka
- Programmers: Tomohiro Kaneko; Eiichi Saita; Naoto Kumagai; Shogo Nakamura
- Artists: Minoru Sashida; Kaori Shinozaki
- Composer: Go Shiina
- Series: Mr. Driller
- Platforms: Arcade, PlayStation
- Release: Arcade: JP: March 2001; PlayStation: JP: November 22, 2001
- Genre: Puzzle
- Modes: Single-player, multiplayer
- Arcade system: Namco System 10

Mr. Driller G (Note: Japanese: ミスタードリラーグレート, Hepburn: Misutā Dorirā Gurēto; Mr. Driller Great) is a 2001 puzzle arcade game developed and released in Japan by Namco for its System 10 hardware. It is the third installment in its Mr. Driller series, and the last released for arcades. Controlling one of seven characters, players must make it to the bottom of the level by destroying colorful formations of blocks. G introduces several new ideas to the series, such as power-ups, a story campaign, and online multiplayer.

The game was developed by Project Driller, the nickname given to Namco's Creative Department #2. Production was headed by series producer Hideo Yoshizawa and Yasuhito Nagaoka. G was intended as the last game in the series, leading to the addition of a larger cast of characters and proper introduction to the in-game world. It was also designed to bridge connections with Dig Dug, an older Namco arcade game that served as inspiration for Mr. Driller. The soundtrack was composed by Go Shiina, featuring a distinct mix of acid house and jazzy J-Pop compositions.

Mr. Driller G performed well in arcades, leading to a home release on the PlayStation the same year. The game was well-received both at release and retrospectively, and is cited as one of the best games in the series. Reviewers praised its visual presentation, amount of content, soundtrack, and additions to the gameplay of its predecessors. In 2013, it was digitally re-released in Japan for the PlayStation Network.

== Gameplay ==
Susumu Hori destroying a group of blocks in the PlayStation version

Mr. Driller G is a puzzle game similar to Puyo Puyo (1990) and the classic arcade game Dig Dug (1982). The story revolves around Susumu Hori, the titular Mr. Driller, and his friends trying to stop the villainous Dr. Manhole and his Ankoku Drillers from destroying the world with giant drills. G has a greater emphasis on story compared to its predecessors, with anime-style intermissions preceding levels. Players choose from one of seven characters to play as: Susumu Hori, the protagonist; Ataru Hori, Susumi's self-contained older brother; Taizo Hori, the protagonist of Dig Dug; Puchi, Susumu's dog; Anna Hottenmeyer, a rival driller from Germany; and Holinger-Z, a drilling robot.

In each level, players must make it to the bottom of a well by destroying, or "drilling", colorful formations of blocks. Destroying blocks results in those above it falling and connecting with similarly colored ones; should four or more matching blocks connect, they will be destroyed, which is useful for creating chain reactions. Blocks will also fall if there is nothing underneath to support them, which can crush players that are underneath them. Players will need to manage their constantly-depleting oxygen, which acts as both a health bar and a timer. Oxygen is replenished by collecting blue air capsules, while oxygen is lost by destroying brown X-marked blocks. If a player is next to a block with an open space above it, they can "jump" to that block. There are also power-up items scattered around levels, such as those that provide a protective shield or refill the player's oxygen to 100%.

The PlayStation version of Mr. Driller G features multiple additions to the game. The main focus is Scenario Driller, an adventure-based story mode where players control each character through a series of levels as they ultimately team up to stop Dr. Manhole. Dristone Mode takes a different approach from the core gameplay, instead playing more like an action role-playing game. Players lose one percent of oxygen by destroying a block, instead of losing it gradually. Destroying certain blocks reveals gems known as Dristones, which are stored in the player's inventory. Depending on their color, Dristones can have a wide array of effects, such as destroying all blocks of a same color on the screen or warping the player back to a previous section. In the multiplayer mode, two players could compete against each other online by connecting to Namco-operated network services through a computer or mobile phone.

== Development and release ==
Mr. Driller G was designed by Project Driller, the nickname given to Namco's Creative Department #2. Production was led by series producer Hideo Yoshizawa and R4: Ridge Racer Type 4 director Yasuhito Nagaoka. Yoshizawa intended G to be the final entry in the series; as such, it was designed to expand on the Mr. Driller universe with an extensive cast of characters and to bridge the connection between Mr. Driller and its predecessor series Dig Dug. The soundtrack was composed by Go Shiina, who is known for his work on franchises such as Tales and God Eater. Where as the first two Mr. Driller games' music were known for its acid house inspiration, the one in G adds new types of music such as jazzy J-Pop. Minoru Sashida, the head graphic designer for Ace Combat 3: Electrosphere, was responsible for the game's bright, visually-distinctive menu interface and graphics. The designs for the new characters were provided by Kaori Shinozaki, as she had done for the first Mr. Driller.

Namco demonstrated Mr. Driller G at the 2001 Amusement Operators Union (AOU) tradeshow in February, presented alongside the lightgun shooter Vampire Night. According to Edge magazine, it attracted considerable attention from attendees. The game was released in Japan in March, running on the company's PlayStation-based System 10 arcade system board. A home release for the PlayStation was released in Japan on November 22, which added new modes and gameplay features. Computer and Video Games reported that Namco was looking to find a publisher for the game in Europe, but G ultimately remained Japan-exclusive. Mr. Driller G was digitally re-released for the PlayStation Network in Japan under the Game Archives series on June 26, 2013.

== Reception ==
Reception

Review scores
Publication	Score
Famitsu	30/40
Joypad	8/10

Award
Publication	Award
Famitsu	Silver Hall of Fame

According to Game Machine, a Japanese arcade trade publication, Mr. Driller G performed well in arcades; its April 15, 2001 issue reported that it was the second best-selling arcade game in Japan, behind Capcom's Street Fighter Zero 3 Upper. The PlayStation version sold 10,938 copies during its first week on the market, and was awarded the Silver Hall of Fame award by Famitsu.

Both at release and retrospectively, Mr. Driller G was well received. Greg, a writer for the French magazine Joypad, believed it was the best Mr. Driller game up to that point. Critics were pleased with the game's amount of content and additions to the gameplay of the series. Masumi Kawamoto of Game Watch called it "the culmination of the series", recommending it to those who haven't played the original or Mr. Driller 2 yet. Medium's Kat Koller agreed, applauding its wide array of playmodes and inventive gameplay mechanics. In a preview, Computer and Video Games writer Paul praised the addition of multiplayer and power-ups, features that were previously absent from its predecessors.

The gameplay and visuals also received praise. Retronauts co-founder Jeremy Parish outright stated G is "essentially the pinnacle of the Mr. Driller arcade experience", and worth importing from the Japanese PlayStation Network. Kawamoto shared his admiration of the game's sound effects and music, in addition to the extensive cast of characters. Koller applauded the presentation for its slick aesthetic and its characters for being visually-distinctive from one another. He concluded that the game builds on what worked in the previous two games, and that successfully establishes the basis for later games.
