= Tales of the World: Tactics Union =

2012 video game

- Developers: Namco Bandai Games, Jupiter
- Publisher: Namco Bandai Games
- Composer: Go Shiina
- Series: Tales
- Platforms: Android, iOS, Nintendo 3DS
- Release: Android: JP: July 2, 2012; iOS: JP: January 10, 2013; Reve Unitia (3DS): JP: October 23, 2014
- Genre: Tactical RPG
- Mode: Single-player

Tales of the World: Tactics Union (Japanese: テイルズ オブ ザ ワールド タクティクス ユニオン, Hepburn: Teiruzu Obu Za Warudo: Takutikusu Yunion) is a tactical role-playing game released for Android mobile devices by Bandai Namco Games. It is a spinoff of the Tales series of video games. It was released on July 2, 2012 in Japan, with no announcement towards release in English speaking regions. In January 2013, the game was ported to the iOS platform, and in October 2014, a 3DS version entitled Tales of the World: Reve Unitia was released as well.

== Gameplay ==
The game plays in the same vein as most tactical role-playing games, such as Final Fantasy Tactics, where the player moves a party of characters across a grid to fight an opposing party. The game is controlled entirely through touch screen input. Prior to starting a battle, characters are customized with different equipment and skills, the latter of which consume "mystic point" when used in battle, but replenish over time.

As battles progress, different characters develop "favorability ratings" for other characters, which can either lead to status bonuses, characters attacking together when near one another, or revealing special conversations.

== Story ==
Like all of the games in the Tales of the World sub-series, the game features crossover appearances of characters from other games in the main series of Tales games. However, the game features an original story, featured in a new land named "Revaila", and two new characters, named "Terun" and "Nahato".

== Development ==
The game was formally announced by Bandai Namco Games in May 2012, for release on July 2, 2012 release. While being announced as a free-to-play game, it supports in-game purchases for things such as equipment or moves, and requires a paid monthly subscription to the KDDI’s Smartpass program. Downloadable content was made available in the weeks after the game's initial release, including an extra level, "Trembling Grove", and additional characters from Tales of Innocence and Tales of Vesperia.

The game was developed to be simple, for casual players not familiar with games of the genre.
