= Family Tennis =

1987 video game

- Cover art
- Developer: Namco
- Publisher: Namco
- Platforms: Family Computer, arcade
- Release: JP: December 1987
- Genre: Sports
- Modes: Single-player, multiplayer
- Arcade system: Nintendo VS. System

Family Tennis (Note: Japanese: ファミリーテニス, Hepburn: Famirī Tenisu) is a 1987 tennis video game developed and published by Namco for the Family Computer. It was released only in Japan in December 1987. An arcade version for the Nintendo VS. System titled VS. Family Tennis was released the same month. It spawned a franchise of the same name, which was renamed World Court for numerous sequels. It was followed by Smash Tennis for the Super Nintendo Entertainment System and Family Tennis Advance for the Game Boy Advance.

While the original game remained exclusive to Japan, Hamster Corporation re-released the VS. System arcade version globally as part of their Arcade Archives series for the Nintendo Switch and PlayStation 4 in January 2025.

== Gameplay ==
Family Tennis is a tennis video game where up to two players can play against each other. There are sixteen playable characters available to choose from. A player scores if the returned ball bounces twice on the opponent's side of the arena or the opponent produces two faults in a row. A World Tour mode and Tournament mode are available for single-player play; they are removed in the arcade version.

== Reception ==
According to Famitsu, Family Tennis sold 74,458 copies during its lifetime in Japan. The game received a 26/40 score from the publication.
