= Tales of Luminaria =

- Developer: Colopl
- Publisher: Bandai Namco Entertainment
- Writers: Sekina Aoi; Okina Baba; Shunsaku Yano; Takashi Tanaka
- Composer: Go Shiina
- Series: Tales
- Platforms: iOS, Android
- Release: JP: November 3, 2021; WW: November 4, 2021

Tales of Luminaria (Note: Japanese: テイルズ オブ ルミナリア, Hepburn: Teiruzu obu Ruminaria) was a 2021 mobile game developed by Colopl which also serves as the twenty-eighth main title in the Tales series. The game was published by Bandai Namco Entertainment and released on iOS and Android. An anime adaptation by Kamikaze Douga premiered on January 20, 2022. The game was shut down on July 19, 2022.

== Development ==
In October 2020, the name Tales of Luminaria was trademarked by Bandai Namco Entertainment in Europe and Japan. At Gamescom 2021, the game was officially revealed, and set to release on iOS and Android. In September 2021, it was announced the game would be developed by Colopl, with Sekina Aoi, Okina Baba, Shunsaku Yano, and Takashi Tanaka handling scenario writing. Shun Saeki handled the character designs and Go Shiina composed the music. The opening animation is produced by Kamikaze Douga and Sunrise. Three songs are created for the game, the inspire song, "Answer" by Frederic and Keina Suda, the opening theme song, "Tomoshi Beat" by Frederic, and the ending theme song, "Regret" (リグレット, Riguretto) by Keina Suda. The game was released on November 3, 2021, in Japan and November 4, 2021, internationally. The Japanese version supports English and Japanese voices and text at launch with no option to change the voice language, while the Global version only has English voices and text, with the Japanese voice option being added on March 29, 2022.

On May 10, 2022, about six months since the game's official launch, the Luminaria development team announced that the game would be shutdown on July 19 of the same year, at 19:00 PDT. All work on any unreleased episodic content during that time would be halted, except for a special "Episode Final" focused around Hugo that leads into the anime adaptation.

== Plot ==
The setting of Luminaria revolves around ancient beings known as Primordial Beasts. When these beasts died, mana flowed from their corpses that gave birth to the world of the present. The humans who lived among them split into two major factions. On one side: the Jerle Federation, a group of city-states who worshipped the Primordial Beasts and live in harmony with them. Most of their fighters carry "Embleo" on their bodies that allow them to tap into hidden reserves of magic power when needed. The Federation's military is about to graduate new students from its elite Blaze Class into the army to defend their nation from enemy incursion. On the other side: the Gildllan Empire, which sees the Primordial Beasts and their mana as a mere means to an end, and exploits them to build high-tech cities for their nation's prosperity. The Empire equips their fighters with "Reactors" that allows them to tap into mana reserves through artificial means. The conflict between the two factions is about to erupt as the Empire's new Lord Chancellor, August Wallenstein, has plans to conquer the world after taking revenge on those who murdered his family. Meanwhile, an unaffiliated group of Adventurers tries to discover the true link between the Primordial Beasts, mana, and the potential fate of the world.

=== Main characters ===
All 21 playable characters are unlocked from the start (after completing the tutorial missions as Leo). The developers had planned to release new episodes for each character on a weekly basis, with eight additional "Crossroad" episodes that involve multiple character perspectives. As of February 2022, all characters had at least one story episode released, including one Crossroad episode. When the game was shut down, not all characters had Episode 2 of their stories released.

| Jerle Federation | Adventurer Group | Gildllan Empire |
|---|---|---|
| Leo Fourcade | Eduoard Rouquier | August Wallenstein |
| Celia Arvier | Lydie Delacroix | Gaspard Herbet |
| Michelle Bouquet | Raoul | Laplace |
| Maxime Hasselmans | Charles | Alexandra von Sonne |
| Yelsy Tw'elteu Huainaz'jin | Ana-Maria Marschner | Amelie Laurence |
| Vanessa Morax | | Falk |
| Lucien Dufaure | | Bastien Forge |
| Lisette Regnier | | Hugo Simon |

== Gameplay ==
Unlike most other games with a gacha system, Luminaria allowed players to use any of 21 playable characters from the start. The gacha system was primarily used to obtain various weapons and costumes to increase the characters' level cap and battle power, with super rare 5-star outfits and weapons unlocking powerful new "Mystic Artes" for the character wearing them that can be used in battle.

Players could choose to play through an individual character's story chapter, or join a party of up to four players for co-op boss battles known as "Fave Fests." The Fave Fests were rotated on a weekly basis, where players choose their favorite of three characters wielding that week's chosen weapon type to use in the battle. Rewards were doled out as players collect more points at the end of the battle, and players can retry as many times as they like.

Most of the gameplay relied on a large button placed near the center of the screen of the player's device. By dragging it in a direction they can move their character, and by tapping it or holding it in place for a second, they made their character unleash attacks that differ depending on the character and the weapon they held. Characters could also unleash Mystic Artes which were charged by landing enough attacks on enemies, or tap another button to make their character instantly consume an equipped recipe for its healing effects.

== Anime adaptation ==
- Tales of Luminaria: The Fateful Crossroad
- Genre: Fantasy
- Original net animation
- Directed by: Shiori Kato; Midori Kato
- Written by: Yoriko Tomita
- Music by: Go Shiina
- Studio: Kamikaze Douga; Anima
- Licensed by: Funimation
- Released: January 21, 2022
- Episodes: 2

In September 2021, an anime adaptation produced by Kamikaze Douga and Anima, titled Tales of Luminaria: The Fateful Crossroad, was announced. The ONA series was streamed internationally by Funimation and Crunchyroll. The series is directed by Shiori Kato and Midori Kato, with scripts by Yoriko Tomita, character designs by Shun Saeki, and composing by Go Shiina. It premiered as a two-part special on January 21, 2022.

| No. | Title | Directed by | Written by | Original release date |
|---|---|---|---|---|
| 1 | "Episode 1" | Shiori Kato & Midori Kato | Yoriko Tomita | January 20, 2022 |
Newly minted Jerle Federation soldiers Leo Fourcade and Celia Arvier arrive at the Fed-occupied city of Lunne with their instructor, Lisette Regnier, on a mission to shut down the Pilier, a large tower created by the Gildllan Empire that provides the town with most of its electricity by sucking the mana out of the surrounding land, leaving it increasingly barren. After dealing with enraged, ape-like beasts near the city gates, the three Feds meet with a researcher named Nicola, who holds a device crafted to shut down the Pilier. However, inside the Pilier, the group runs into two Imperial infiltrators. Alexandra von Sonne, the White Wolf, clashes with Lisette. The others find themselves facing off against Hugo Simon, a former ally who defected to the Empire. Despite their efforts, the Fed soldiers are defeated as Alexandra and Hugo escape with Nicola's device, and soon repurpose it to supercharge the Pilier instead. The following night, Alexandra fights Lisette again, and Hugo manages to jump to the top of the Pilier where Leo awaits. During the duel, Hugo places the device into a pedestal to charge the Pilier, but is shocked to discover he activated a hidden energy cannon that destroys a section of the city and the wall, allowing the Empire to retake the city.
| 2 | "Episode 2" | Shiori Kato & Midori Kato | Yoriko Tomita | January 20, 2022 |
Leo soon finds himself surrounded by the Empire's most powerful troops on top of the Pilier, when he is saved at the last minute by his ally Lucien Dufaure who uses a rare relic to trap the enemy in a giant sphere before fleeing the city with Leo. Leo and Lucien regroup with Celia, Lisette, and Nicola to think of a way to destroy the cannon before it can be fired on another city, while August Wallenstein uses his immense magic power to break the sphere from inside. The following night, Lisette fights Bastien Forge, Lucien tries to hold off Alexandra, and Celia tries to line up a difficult shot with her bow to destroy the magic crystal powering the cannon. Meanwhile, Leo goes back to the top of the Pilier for a rematch with Hugo. Despite the Empire's attacks throwing off her aim, Celia manages to destroy the crystal, only for August to reveal he has enough magic power to fuel the cannon himself. Leo fights through Hugo and uses all his strength to cut through August's staff and shut down the Pilier. With his plans ruined, August retreats through a portal and Hugo soon follows. The next day, the Empire still holds Lunne, but starts evacuating several wounded citizens who can no longer rely on the Pilier's power for assistance. Outside the city, Leo hopes to one day reconcile with Hugo.
