= Mr. Driller 2 =

2000 video game

- Promotional sales flyer, depicting Susumu and Anna
- Developer: Namco
- Publishers: Namco: Game Boy Advance; JP: Namco; NA: Namco Hometek
- Director: Yasuhito Nagaoka
- Producer: Hideo Yoshizawa
- Composer: Go Shiina
- Series: Mr. Driller
- Platforms: Arcade, Game Boy Advance, Windows
- Release: July 2000: Arcade; JP: July 2000; NA: September 2000 Game Boy Advance; JP: March 21, 2001; EU: January 30, 2004; NA: April 12, 2005 Windows; JP: March 29, 2002
- Genre: Puzzle
- Modes: Single-player, multiplayer
- Arcade system: Namco System 10

Mr. Driller 2 (Note: Japanese: ミスタードリラー2, Hepburn: Misuta Dorira Tsu) is a 2000 puzzle video game developed and published by Namco for arcades. It is the second game in the Mr. Driller series, and was later ported to the Game Boy Advance and Windows in 2001 and 2002. The game introduces two new characters to the series, Puchi (Susumu's dog), and Anna (Susumu's rival).

The Game Boy Advance version of Mr. Driller 2 was digitally re-released via the Wii U Virtual Console in 2014, and via the Nintendo Classics service in 2025.

== Gameplay ==
Screenshot taken from the Windows version. To the left is the player destroying formations of blocks, and to the right is the player's air meter and score.

Mr. Driller 2 is a puzzle video game and the direct sequel to Mr. Driller. The playing area consists of a large stack of colored blocks, which the player digs through as one of the Drillers (Susumu or Anna) in order to reach an end goal at a specified depth; in Endless Driller, the block field is infinite and has no set goal. The player is given a limited number of lives and a limited supply of air to reach the goal. Throughout the playing area, the player can find air capsules to replenish 20% of their air supply. If the driller is either crushed by blocks or runs out of air, the player will lose a life.

When drilling into a standard block (yellow, blue, red, or green), it will dissolve. Falling blocks will join with the first block it meets of the same color while it is falling. A block segment made up of 4 or more blocks will dissolve if it is created by a falling block joining onto the segment. There are also Crystal Blocks that eventually dissolve after flashing for a brief amount of time. Every 500 ft. there is a large green block that once drilled will clear all blocks above it. Brown X-Blocks require 5 drills to dissolve and consume 20% of the player's air supply in Mission and Endless Driller, while they add 5 seconds to the player's timer in Time Attack Driller. Exclusive to Time Attack Driller are the Silver X-Blocks which cannot be dissolved.

=== Modes ===
==== Single Player Modes ====
- Mission Driller
  - Mission Driller is the story mode of the game. The player selects one of three stages of varying difficulty to start. Each stage requires the player to reach the goal by drilling to a certain depth. The player is shown a story-related cutscene upon completing a stage. The cutscene changes based on the character the player uses. Upon completing the starting three stages, a fourth extra stage is unlocked.
- Endless Driller
  - In Endless Driller, the player chooses between three difficulty levels which determine the number of lives the player gets. Unlike Time Attack Driller and Mission Driller, Endless Driller does not have an end goal. Due to the lack of an end goal, the player keeps drilling until they are out of lives.
- Time Attack Driller
  - In Time Attack Driller, the player must reach the goal of a certain depth within a certain time. Unlike Mission Driller and Endless Driller, the player is given an unlimited supply as there are no air capsules to be found. Small clocks replace air capsules in this mode; when collected the timer is reduced by the amount of time specified on the clock.

==== Two-Player Mode ====
The two-player mode is a versus mode between the two players to see who can drill the furthest. In the Game Boy Advance version of the game, the players must use a Link Cable to connect their systems, and both players require a copy of the game. In the Virtual Console release of the game, the two-player mode is unplayable due to the inability to connect with another system.

== Development and release ==
Mr. Driller 2 was released by Namco for arcades in Japan in July 2000, and in North America in September. A home port for the Game Boy Advance was released in Japan as a system launch title on March 21, 2001 and was later released in Europe on January 30, 2004, with distribution through Infogrames. The North American release was delayed to April 12, 2005. A Windows version of the game was developed by NEC Interchannel and released on March 29, 2002, allowing support for multiplayer via LAN. The Game Boy Advance port was digitally re-released for the Wii U Virtual Console in North America on July 17, 2014, and in PAL regions on May 15, 2015.

== Reception ==
Reception

Aggregate score
Aggregator	Score
Metacritic	62/100

Review scores
Publication	Score
1Up.com	C
Famitsu	31/40
GameSpot	6.9/10
GameSpy	2.5/5
IGN	5/10

Award
Publication	Award
Famitsu	Silver Hall of Fame

In Japan, Game Machine listed Mr. Driller 2 as the third most successful arcade game of September 2000.

The Game Boy Advance home port was met with a more divided response, holding a 62/100 score on review aggregator website Metacritic. IGN found the game to have very few additions compared to the original game, specifically with its gameplay for being nothing more than "repetitive buttonmashing" with small amounts of strategy involved. GameSpy felt that the game was much more barebones than other games in the series, unfavorably comparing to Mr. Driller Drill Spirits on the Nintendo DS, stating that the game was a pointless purchase compared to the latter. GameSpy also criticized Namco for releasing the Game Boy Advance version four years after its debut in Japan, saying that they instead should have put resources into localizing the Japanese-exclusive Mr. Driller Drill Land for the GameCube. GameSpot was lukewarm towards the graphics and small amount of game modes, while 1UP.com labeled it an "incredibly dated" addition to the console's library for its general lack of content. 1UP.com also agreed with GameSpy on the game being dated compared to other games in the series, saying that it would have been much more of a worthwhile purchase had it been released four years prior.

In a more positive review, Japanese publication Famitsu, who awarded it the Silver Hall of Fame award, found it to be an addictive puzzle game and a large improvement over its predecessor. They also praised the multiplayer aspect and colorful graphics. GameSpot praised it for the core gameplay still being challenging and addictive, alongside its budget-friendly price point and humorous character animations. They stated that the game was worth owning simply for its gameplay alone. IGN liked the game's high-score saving, save point system and unlockables, while GameSpy liked its strategic and addictive gameplay, alongside the multiplayer mode for being a "fun little diversion". German publication 64 Power liked the game's interesting premise and colorful visuals, although stated it was inferior to titles such as ChuChu Rocket! and Kuru Kuru Kururin.
