= Star Trigon =

2002 video game

- App Store icon
- Developers: Project Driller; Namco Networks (PC, mobile)
- Publisher: Namco
- Composers: Jesahm; Satoru Kosaki; Hiroshi Okubo; Tetsukazu Nakanishi
- Series: Mr. Driller
- Platforms: Arcade, iOS, iPod Touch, Windows
- Release: Arcade: JP: July 2002; iPod/iOS: WW: September 16, 2008; Windows: NA: 2009
- Genre: Puzzle
- Mode: Single-player
- Arcade system: Namco System 10

Star Trigon (Note: Japanese: スタートリゴン, Hepburn: Sutā Torigon) is a 2002 puzzle arcade game published in Japan by Namco. Ports for iPod, iOS devices and Windows were also released. In the game, the player controls one of three characters — Wataru Hoshi, Chuta Bigbang and Susumu Hori — the objective being to rescue creatures known as "Uchijins" by hopping from planet to planet to draw triangles and capture them. The player will automatically circle the planet they are on, requiring timed jumps to avoid falling off the playfield. It ran on the Namco System 10 hardware.

The game was developed by Project Driller, the internal development team behind the Mr. Driller series, and is both a spin-off of said series and the team's only off-shoot title. The mobile and PC ports of the game were developed by Namco Networks, and is one of the first mobile games to be ported to multiple platforms at once. The iOS version of Star Trigon was met with mixed reviews from critics, who praised its anime-influenced art style and refreshing concept but criticized its high price tag and lack of depth.

== Gameplay ==
Screenshot of the tutorial stage

Star Trigon is a puzzle action video game. Controlling a character, the player is tasked with rescuing the Uchijins drifting through space under a time limit, done by hopping planet to planet to form large triangles. An Uchijin will be collected if it is in a triangle once completed, and the player would progress to the next stage once all the Uchijins are saved. The player rotates around the planet it is standing on, and can jump to another by pressing the button; jumps must be timed carefully to avoid falling off the playfield and losing a life. The player has an oxygen meter that will deplete as the stage progresses, but can be replenished by collecting air capsules.

The player can select one of three characters, each having different speed and oxygen consumption rates — Mr. Driller protagonist Susumu Hori, Wataru Hoshi and Chuta Bigbang. The iPod and iOS versions of the game add Taizo Hori from the Dig Dug series as a playable character. Stages become progressively more difficult as the game continues, increasing both the character's speed and oxygen consumption. Later stages introduce obstacles that must be avoided, such as large flares and black holes that will suck in the player if close by.

== Development and release ==
Star Trigon was originally released for arcades in Japan in July 2002. The game was developed by internal group Project Driller, known for creating the Mr. Driller franchise, and is both a spin-off of said series and the team's only off-shoot game. It ran on the Namco System 10 arcade board, which also ran games Taiko no Tatsujin and Kotoba no Puzzle: Mojipittan. A version for iPod Touch and iOS devices was developed by Namco Networks and released worldwide on September 16, 2008, followed by a Microsoft Windows port in 2009. The game was later retconned into Bandai Namco's fictional United Galaxy Space Force video game saga in 2011, alongside the original Mr. Driller and several other Namco video games. Bandai Namco Entertainment ended support for the arcade version on October 1, 2017.

== Reception ==
Reception

Review scores
Publication	Score
IGN	6.9/10 (iOS)
Pocket Gamer	6/10 (iOS)
GameZebo	4/5 (PC)
Slide to Play	2/4 (iOS)

The mobile port of Star Trigon in particular received mixed reviews from critics, being criticized for its high price point and lack of depth or variety. IGN said that the game became boring after a while and disliking its $10 price tag, saying that the game was better off as a $5 title instead. Slide to Play echoed a similar response, saying that the game was "mediocre" at its $10 price and criticizing its sudden spike in difficulty towards the end. Pocket Gamer said the game was "too shallow" in terms of content to warrant its price, while also noting the game's lack of longevity. Reviewing the Windows version, GameZebo disliked the game's long game over sequences and "mind-bogglingly slow" story cutscenes.

Despite its criticism, reviewers praised its unique gameplay concept and character designs. GameZebo called its gameplay "fantastic" and "delightfully original", while Slide to Play praised its anime-like character designs and soundtrack. IGN had a similar response, applauding its original gameplay and cute art style, with Pocket Gamer adding that the game was fun to play despite its high price point. IGN also appreciated the game's replay value with its character selection, which GameZebo agreed with. GAME Watch compared the arcade version's controls to games like Libble Rabble (1983) and Katamari Damacy (2004).
