= Hideo Yoshizawa =

Japanese video game designer and director

- 吉沢 秀雄
- Born: September 2, 1960 (age 65); Yokohama, Kanagawa, Japan
- Occupations: Video game director, producer and writer
- Notable work: Ninja Gaiden; Klonoa; Mr Driller

Hideo Yoshizawa (吉沢 秀雄, Yoshizawa Hideo) born September 2, 1960, is a Japanese video game director, screenwriter, and producer, most famous for his work on the Ninja Gaiden and Klonoa series of video games. Prior to being employed by Namco, he worked for Tecmo and was involved in the original Ninja Gaiden trilogy for the Nintendo Entertainment System under the name "Sakurazaki".

As of April 2016, Yoshizawa has left Bandai Namco Studios and is now working freelance. On January 10, 2017, Henshin announced that they had signed Yoshizawa on board for their then upcoming animated film adaptation of Klonoa as an executive producer.

Yoshizawa is a professor at Tokyo Polytechnic University.

== Games credited ==
- 1986: Mighty Bomb Jack (director)
- 1988: Ninja Gaiden (director, story, screenplay)
- 1990: Ninja Gaiden II: The Dark Sword of Chaos (executive director, story)
- 1991: Ninja Gaiden III: The Ancient Ship of Doom (executive producer)
- 1991: Radia Senki: Reimeihen (scenario, executive producer)
- 1993: Smash Tennis (director, screenplay, designer)
- 1997: Klonoa: Door to Phantomile (director, screenplay)
- 1998: R4: Ridge Racer Type 4 (project supervisor)
- 1999: Mr. Driller (producer)
- 2000: Mr. Driller 2 (producer)
- 2001: Mr. Driller G (producer)
- 2001: Klonoa 2: Lunatea's Veil (supervisor, story)
- 2004: Mr. Driller Drill Spirits (producer)
- 2005: Pac-Pix (producer)
- 2006: Trioncube (producer)
- 2006: QuickSpot (producer)
- 2008: Klonoa (Wii) (producer)
- 2009: Mr. Driller: Drill Till You Drop
- 2009: Muscle March (producer)
- 2022: Klonoa Phantasy Reverie Series (special thanks)
