= Mr. Driller =

Video game series

- Genre: Puzzle
- Developers: Namco; Project Driller
- Publishers: Namco; Bandai Namco Entertainment
- Creators: Yasuhito Nagaoka; Hideo Yoshizawa
- Platforms: Arcade, PlayStation, Dreamcast, WonderSwan Color, Game Boy Color, Windows, Game Boy Advance, mobile phone, GameCube, Nintendo DS, Xbox 360, DSiWare, Wii, iOS, Nintendo Switch, PlayStation 4, PlayStation 5, Xbox One, Xbox Series X/S
- First release: Mr. Driller; November 1999
- Latest release: Mr. Driller Drill Land (PS4, PS5); November 4, 2021
- Parent series: Dig Dug

Mr. Driller (Note: Japanese: ミスタードリラー, Hepburn: Misuta Dorira) is a puzzle video game franchise created by Yasuhito Nagaoka and Hideo Yoshizawa for Namco. The eponymous first game was released in 1999 for arcades and several home consoles, such as the PlayStation. Gameplay in the series consists of controlling Susumu Hori, the titular Mr. Driller, or one of his friends and destroying colorful formations of blocks to make it to the bottom of a well. In order to survive, players need to collect air capsules to replenish their depleting oxygen and avoid being crushed by falling blocks.

Nagaoka intended Mr. Driller to be the third mainline entry in Namco's Dig Dug series. The two franchises have since been directly connected to one another through sharing characters and similar gameplay concepts. Project Driller was established as the development team for the series, which produced four sequels from 2000 to 2004. Bandai Namco Entertainment became the owner of the Mr. Driller property after Namco's 2005 merger with Bandai, where it released several more installments for digital distribution services and mobile devices.

The Mr. Driller series was popular in Japan and its characters have become synonymous with the Namco brand. Reception from western publications has varied depending on the game. Most critics agree the series benefits from its simplicity and addictive nature, though several installments have been criticized for their lack of content and recycling of assets from earlier games.

== Titles ==
=== Games ===
Release timeline
1999	Mr. Driller
2000	Mr. Driller 2
2001	Mr. Driller G
2002	Mr. Driller A
2002	Mr. Driller Drill Land
2003	Mr. Driller: Driller Puzzle
2004	Mr. Driller Drill Spirits
2005
2006	Mr. Driller Aqua
2007
2008	Mr. Driller Online
2009	Mr. Driller W
2009	Mr. Driller: Drill Till You Drop
2010	Mr. Driller VS
2011
2012
2013
2014
2015	Mr. Driller for Kakao

- Mr. Driller (1999) was first released to arcades for Namco's System 12 arcade hardware. It was later ported to several consoles, including the Game Boy Color, PlayStation, Dreamcast, WonderSwan Color, Windows, and mobile phones. It introduces the core components of the series, the character Susumu Hori, and a story involving creatures known as Undergrounders flooding the Earth with giant blocks.
- Mr. Driller 2 (2000) was released for arcades in Japan and later for the Game Boy Advance and Windows. The sequel features Susumu's rival, the hot-headed German driller Anna Hottenmeyer, alongside improvements such as increasing the game speed, two-player cooperative play, and additional game modes.
- Mr. Driller G (2001) was released for arcades and the PlayStation in Japan, serving as the final Mr. Driller game for arcades and the first developed by Project Driller. In addition to including a story-driven campaign mode, G adds several new playable characters, including Susumu's older brother Ataru Hori, his father Taizo Hori, the dog Puchi, and the drilling robot Horinger-Z.
- Mr. Driller A (2002) was released in Japan for the Game Boy Advance. The game presents new mechanics and concepts that are designed after classic role-playing games, as opposed to the fast-paced action of previous installments. Players can also care for and train a virtual pet named a "Pacteria" through progress made in the main game.
- Mr. Driller Drill Land (2002) was released for the GameCube in Japan. The game is more ambitious than previous Mr. Driller games, featuring multiple game modes that vary in gameplay. These modes are tied together through a menu and presentation designed after an amusement park. In 2020, the game was remastered for the Nintendo Switch and PC through Steam with English subtitles.
- Mr. Driller: Driller Puzzle (2003) was released for Japanese mobile phones through Java and i-Mode. The game has players completing a series of levels in the quickest amount of time. A sequel named Mr. Driller: Driller Puzzle S was released in 2006.
- Mr. Driller Drill Spirits (2004) was released for the Nintendo DS and takes advantage of the system's dual screens. The game reuses concepts established in Drill Land and includes boss fights, item shops, and multiplayer modes.
- Mr. Driller Aqua (2006) was released for Japanese mobile phones through the i-Mode and EZweb networks. It features an aquatic theme and was available for a limited time through Namco Bandai Games' mobile phone content providers.
- Mr. Driller Online (2008) was released for the Xbox 360 as a downloadable release. It contains an online multiplayer mode that is accessible through the Xbox Live online subscription service, though a single-player mode is also available.
- Mr. Driller: Drill Till You Drop (2009) was released for the Nintendo DSi through the DSiWare service, and is titled Sakkuto Hama Reru Hori Hori Action: Mr. Driller in Japan. It features the "Dristone" role-playing game mode from G and Drill Land, where players collect crystals that have varying effects on the game. The game was delisted as of March 2019.
- Mr. Driller W (2009) was released for the WiiWare service for the Wii, and is known as Mr. Driller World in Japan. W reuses mechanics from Drill Land while being presented in high-definition and featuring online leaderboards.
- Mr. Driller VS (2010) was released for i-Mode cellular devices in Japan. It includes a local multiplayer mode and online co-op using Bluetooth. The servers were shut down in May 2011.
- Mr. Driller for Kakao (2015) was developed and published by Netmarble for iOS in South Korea. It uses free-to-play elements and involves players trying to collect pets that are trapped inside blocks.

== Common elements ==
The Mr. Driller games are puzzle action games and have been described as a cross between Puyo Puyo and Dig Dug. Players control a character that must destroy, or "drill", colorful formations of blocks in order to reach the bottom of a well. Blocks of the same color can connect to each other; if four of a kind connect, they are destroyed, which can be used to create chain reactions. The player has a constantly depleting oxygen meter that can be replenished by collecting blue air capsules. Oxygen is lost by destroying brown "x"-marked blocks, which take five hits to destroy. Certain characters have their own attributes and abilities, such as depleting oxygen less and moving faster. Later games introduce mechanics such as star-marked blocks that disappear after a brief period, boss fights, power-ups, and game modes that implement ideas from role-playing games.

== Development ==
The original Mr. Driller was created by R4: Ridge Racer Type 4 director Yasuhito Nagaoka and former Tecmo employee Hideo Yoshizawa. Nagaoka drafted the game in 1998 as a second sequel to Dig Dug, a classic Namco arcade game from 1982, aptly named Dig Dug 3. The game was designed to be more puzzle-like in gameplay structure, a contrast to the action-oriented gameplay of Dig Dug and Dig Dug II. Yoshizawa made several alterations to Nagaoka's prototype build, including the renaming to Mr. Driller. Namco released the game in arcades in 1999 to critical and commercial success. Mr. Driller was ported to several platforms, including the Dreamcast, PlayStation, and Game Boy Color.

Yoshizawa and Nagaoka quickly began work on a sequel, Mr. Driller 2, in late 1999. The two worked to implement new features, such as a second-player character and making the gameplay faster and more chaotic than the original. The sequel was released for arcades in 2000 to moderate success and was followed by a port for the Game Boy Advance in 2001. The Game Boy Advance version was a launch title for the system and sold over 100,000 copies, but the game wasn't released in North America and Europe until 2005.

The third entry, Mr. Driller G, was released in 2001 for arcades and later the PlayStation. The game was created to be more story-driven than the previous installments, which expanded on the Mr. Driller universe and helped bridge the connection between the Mr. Driller and Dig Dug franchises. Taizo Hori, the protagonist of the Dig Dug series, is a playable character in G and is revealed to be the father of Susumu and his older brother Ataru Hori. The PlayStation version was only moderately successful with around 10,000 being sold during launch week.

Yoshizawa intended G to be the final game in the series, but Namco was approached by Nintendo to create a Mr. Driller game for the GameCube that took advantage of the console's GameCube – Game Boy Advance link cable peripheral. This resulted in the creation of Mr. Driller A for the Game Boy Advance and Mr. Driller Drill Land for the GameCube in 2002. A implemented a Tamagotchi-inspired virtual pet that could be transferred to Drill Land. Though Drill Land received the most acclaim out of any game in the series, its exclusivity to the GameCube made it a commercial failure. Namco became less interested in supporting the franchise as a result. Mr. Driller Drill Spirits, the second portable entry in the series, was released in 2004 for the Nintendo DS and reused many of Drill Land's game modes and assets, though condensed to meet the system's hardware limitations. Namco's North American division stripped most of its content in order for it to be ready in time for the launch of the DS in the United States, a move that garnered significant criticism from publications.

Namco Bandai Games became the owner of the Mr. Driller intellectual property after Namco's 2005 merger with Bandai. Mr. Driller Online (2008) for the Xbox 360, Mr. Driller: Drill Till You Drop (2009) for DSiWare, and Mr. Driller W (2009) for WiiWare all recycle art assets and pre-established concepts from earlier games. Yoshizawa considered Drill Till You Drop to be the "culmination" of the series and likely the last one he would develop. By the early 2010s, Namco Bandai largely abandoned the property outside several mobile phone spin-offs.

In 2020, Bandai Namco Entertainment began to remaster of Drill Land for the Nintendo Switch and PC as part of its Encore series of remasters. The decision to remaster the game was based on the success of the remake for Katamari Damacy (2004). Yoshizawa, who had left Bandai Namco in 2016, supervised the project. The remaster was released in 2020 worldwide, titled Mr. Driller Encore in Japan. Maya Ito, the producer for Encore, said that Bandai Namco would consider continuing the series if the remake was popular enough.

=== Related games ===
The scrolling shooters Baraduke (1985) and Baraduke II (1988) have retroactively been connected to the Mr. Driller series through Baraduke's protagonist, Masuyo Tobi, having been formerly married to Taizo Hori. The 2002 arcade game Star Trigon adopts many of Mr. Driller's characters and concepts. Star Trigon is a puzzle game where players hop across planets to create triangles in order to rescue yellow creatures. Project Driller developed Star Trigon and is considered a spin-off of the Mr. Driller series. The game was ported to mobile phones and Windows in 2008.

In 2005, Namco revived its Dig Dug series with Dig Dug: Digging Strike for the Nintendo DS. The game was designed to be closer to the company's original vision of Mr. Driller, and features gameplay that combines mechanics present in Dig Dug, Dig Dug II, and Mr. Driller. Digging Strike was part of Namco's continuing efforts in making Dig Dug and Mr. Driller part of the company's pillar franchises. It received mixed reviews and was primarily criticized for its lack of long-lasting appeal and replay value. The 2005 compilation NamCollection includes Mr. Driller along with four other Namco-published PlayStation games for the PlayStation 2, in addition to bonus material such as conceptual art.

== Reception ==
Aggregate review scores
Game	GameRankings	Metacritic
Mr. Driller (PlayStation)	75%	
Mr. Driller (Dreamcast)	82%	
Mr. Driller (Game Boy Color)	65%	
Mr. Driller 2	65%	62/100
Mr. Driller Drill Land	89%	
Mr. Driller A	80%	
Mr. Driller Drill Spirits	71%	70/100
Mr. Driller Online	50%	45/100
Mr. Driller W	75%	71/100
Mr. Driller Drill Till You Drop	77%	73/100

In Japan, the Mr. Driller series was commercially and critically successful, and its characters have become synonymous with the Namco brand. The original received the 1st Arcadia Grand Prize from the Japanese magazine Monthly Arcadia, and Namco received a prestigious award from Edge for Drill Land. Famitsu awarded the Game Boy Color port of Mr. Driller, Mr. Driller G, and the Game Boy Advance port of Mr. Driller 2 the Silver Hall of Fame awards, while Mr. Driller A and Drill Land received the Gold Hall of Fame award.

Western perception of the series has varied depending on the game, though consensus agrees its gameplay is simple and addictive. The Dreamcast conversion of Mr. Driller received negative attention from the press for being technically inferior to Namco's previous Dreamcast offering, the 3D weapon-based fighter Soulcalibur. Journalist Jeremy Parish speculates this backlash resulted in the series receiving a largely lukewarm reception outside Japan.

Mr. Driller G and Drill Land have been ranked as the best in the series for their quality and amount of content, while Online, W, and Drill Till You Drop have been listed as the weakest for their poor presentation and lack of innovation. Online in particular was negatively received for its online multiplayer, which multiple reviews found to have been unfinished and "broken". Drill Spirits and home ports of Mr. Driller and Mr. Driller 2 were criticized for being barren of content, though the Japanese and European releases of Drill Spirits have been identified as being a far bigger improvement over the North American version for their inclusion of additional game modes.
