= Mr. Driller Drill Spirits =

2004 video game

- Japanese box art
- Developer: Namco
- Publisher: Namco
- Producer: Hideo Yoshizawa
- Designer: Fumihiro Suzuki
- Programmers: Masanori Higashi; Ayako Murakami
- Artist: Kaori Shinozaki
- Composer: Hiromi Shibano
- Series: Mr. Driller
- Platform: Nintendo DS
- Release: NA: November 30, 2004; JP: December 2, 2004; PAL: March 11, 2005
- Genre: Puzzle
- Modes: Single-player, multiplayer

Mr. Driller Drill Spirits (Note: Japanese: ミスタードリラー ドリルスピリッツ, Hepburn: Misutā Dorirā Doriru Supirittsu) is a 2004 puzzle video game developed and published by Namco for the Nintendo DS. Controlling one of six characters, the player must make it to the bottom of each stage by destroying, colored formations of blocks while preventing their oxygen meter from depleting. Multiple different gamemodes are present, including a single-player campaign, a time-attack mode, and a competitive multiplayer mode. It is the sixth entry in the Mr. Driller series.

Originally known as New Mister Driller and later Mr. Driller DS, Drill Spirits was first shown at the E3 2004 tradeshow during a showcasing of third-party games in development for the Nintendo DS. It was produced by series creator Hideo Yoshizawa, and was created to take advantage of the system's touch control and dual-screen features. The game was announced as a launch title for the system, alongside Namco's own Ridge Racer DS. The North American version excludes several features announced prior in press releases due to time constraints, including an entire gamemode called Dristone Driller. Drill Spirits received mixed reviews for its lack of depth and multiplayer modes requiring two game cards to play, although its gameplay, visuals and modes were the subject of praise. It was followed by Mr. Driller Online in 2008.

== Gameplay ==
In the Pressure Driller gamemode, the player will need to destroy a giant mechanical drill that pursues them, by collecting energy capsules and firing back at them.

Mr. Driller Drill Spirits is a puzzle video game. The player controls a character that must make it to the bottom of each stage by destroying, or "drilling", formations of colored blocks that litter the playfield. The game features six playable characters: Susumu Hori, the main protagonist of the series; Anna Hottenmeyer, a German driller and rival of Susumu; Ataru Hori, Susumu's self-contained older brother; Taizo Hori, the father of Susumu and Ataru and the protagonist of the Dig Dug series; Puchi, Susumu's pet dog; and Holinger-Z, a drilling robot. Each character has their own unique traits that can alter the gameplay; for instance, Taizo can drill faster than other, while Holinger-Z can sustain an extra hit. The player has an oxygen meter at the right of the screen that acts as a timer, which will deplete as the stage progresses. Oxygen can be replenished by collecting air capsules, while oxygen can be lost by destroying brown-colored X Blocks. Blocks will disappear if four or more matching colors connect, and will fall if there is nothing supporting them underneath.

Drill Spirits contains several gamemodes. In "Mission Driller" the player must complete each stage, taking place in different countries around the world and becoming increasingly difficult. "Pressure Driller" has the player outrunning an enormous mechanical drill named the Destroyer Drill that pursues them through an endless stage; the objective is to collect orange energy capsules and use them to launch powerful blasts at the drill when its weakspot is revealed. "Time Attack" has the player completing a short stage as fast as they can while collecting clocks to stop the countdown timer. A multiplayer mode is also present, which requires two copies of the game to play. The Japanese and European releases of the game features slight alterations; these include the addition of a new character, Ataru's black pet rabbit Usagi, and a mode called "Dristone Driller" where the player must complete a stage while drilling as little as possible, with a small percentage of oxygen being depleted for drilling blocks. Items called "dristones" can also be found that have varying effects on the game based on their color, such as changing the colors of certain blocks, destroying entire formations of blocks, and giving the player a one-hit shield.

== Development and release ==
Mr. Driller Drill Spirits was first announced during E3 2004 by Nintendo, in a panel relating to third-party games being produced for their then-upcoming handheld, the Nintendo DS. It was originally given the tentative title of New Mister Driller. Namco revealed further details on the game in September, renaming the game to Mr. Driller DS and was about 70% complete. Produced by series creator Hideo Yoshizawa, the game was created to take advantage of the system's dual screen and touch control features. A playable demo was presented at the Nintendo Gamer's Summit in October, announced to be a system launch title alongside Ridge Racer DS. It was officially released in North America on November 30; due to time constraints, several features announced during press releases, such as the Dristone mode, were cut from the game. Drill Spirits was released in Japan on December 2 with the removed features added, coinciding with the debut of the system in Japan. It was later released in both Europe and Australia on March 11, 2005.

== Reception ==
Reception

Aggregate score
Aggregator	Score
Metacritic	70/100

Review scores
Publication	Score
Famitsu	29/40
GameSpot	6.6/10
GameSpy	3.5/5
IGN	6.5/10
Nintendo World Report	7/10
Nintendojo	6.5/10
Yahoo! Games	7/10

Mr. Driller Drill Spirits was met with a mixed response from critics. It holds a 70/100 on review aggregator website Metacritic, indicating "mixed or average reviews".

Nintendo World Report said it was a great title for fans of "skin-of-your-teeth puzzle games". The graphics were praised by many, with IGN, GameSpot and Famitsu liking the bright colors and cartoony art-style. GameSpy said that its Powerpuff Girls-style was a fresh idea for the genre. IGN said that the game's presentation was decent, with an interesting style and sprite effects. Nintendojo and Famitsu also liked the sprites for their smooth, clean animation. The inclusion of touch-screen controls via the DS Stylus was seen by IGN and GameSpy as a generally unneeded mechanic, with both saying that the D-Pad allowed for much quicker, precise actions. While some liked the game's music for being upbeat and catchy, others found it forgettable and bland. The game's sound effects and voice acting were also the subject of criticism, with IGN and Nintendo World Report in particular calling them annoying and poorly-implemented. IGN also liked the game's usage of the console's dual-screens, but thought that DS platform should have utilized more capabilities for this game.

Most publications found the gameplay to be enjoyable and fun to play. Nintendo World Report greatly praised Drill Spirits's gameplay for being well-designed and unique compared to other puzzle games, with IGN and Nintendojo saying it would satisfy fans of the series. Yahoo! Games appreciated its balanced difficulty level and appealing nature to newer players. The lack of a single-card multiplayer feature was the subject of criticism by several publications; Nintendo World Report and GameSpy criticized Namco for removing the single-card feature from the Japanese and European versions, while IGN reacted with confusion since Namco's other multiplayer game for the system, Ridge Racer DS, had a single-card option for multiplayer. Several also disliked the lack of depth and additional gamemodes. Nintendojo criticized the multiplayer itself for being unenjoyable at times, finding it inferior to the multiplayer options found in games such as Puyo Pop Fever and Bomberman DS. Famitsu felt the game was inferior to previous games in the series, such as Mr. Driller Drill Land and Mr. Driller Ace, with its lack of extra features. The included modes critics reacted to positively; Famitsu labeled the Dristone Driller mode as the highlight of the package, while IGN liked the Pressure Driller mode for its uniqueness and for building on the series' core gameplay. Famitsu and Yahoo! Games praised the usage of unlockable extras for adding replay value. Retrospectively, Retronauts said the game was more of a stripped-down version of Mr. Driller Drill Till You Drop, only recommending it to players who were unable to get ahold of the latter.
