= Mr. Driller Online =

2008 video game

- Developer(s): Namco Bandai Games
- Publisher(s): Namco Bandai Games
- Series: Mr. Driller
- Platform(s): Xbox 360
- Release: WW: April 2, 2008
- Genre(s): Puzzle
- Mode(s): Single-player, multiplayer

Mr. Driller Online (Note: Japanese: ミスタードリラーオンライン, Hepburn: Misutā Dorirā Onrain) is a downloadable puzzle video game created by Namco Bandai and released in 2008 for the Xbox 360. It is the fourth game in the Mr. Driller series of puzzle games and re-uses many assets from Mr. Driller Drill Land.

== Gameplay ==
Gameplay screenshot

The objective of Mr. Driller Online is to drill to the bottom of a long, vertical pit filled with blocks of varying colors. The player controls Susumu (or one of his friends) and can move left or right, fall infinitely, and climb single blocks if there are no other blocks on top of them. The player can also drill in any direction. Colored blocks clear from the playfield when drilled, causing other blocks above them to shake and then fall. When falling, like-colored blocks stick together, and if they form a large block of four or more units, that block immediately clears from the playfield as well. Blocks that fall on top of the driller will crush him/her, causing the player to lose a life. The driller also has a limited air supply that depletes slowly and can be replenished by picking up air capsules and special items along the way. Drilling a brown "X" block causes the player to consume a large amount of air at once, and the player loses a life if the driller's air runs out. The game is over when all lives have been lost or the player successfully reaches the bottom of the pit.

Mr. Driller Online features two single-player modes, Arcade and Challenge. Arcade mode presents the player with the basic gameplay rules stated above, while Challenge mode adds specific, randomly chosen challenges to each section of the level, such as completing the section within a certain time limit or picking up a limited number of air capsules. Additionally, the game supports online multiplayer via Xbox Live, allowing ranked and unranked matches of two types: Versus mode, in which two players compete for the highest score within a set time limit, and Tag Team mode, where four players split into two teams. Mr. Driller Online also supports online leaderboards, but does not support local split-screen multiplayer.

Mr. Driller Online was included as one of the games in Namco Museum Virtual Arcade, but unlike the majority of the games on the compilation, it is not actually accessible from the disc itself. Instead, it is added to the user's Xbox Live Arcade menu, but is removed once the disk is removed from the system.

== Reception ==
Reception

Aggregate score
Aggregator	Score
Metacritic	45/100

Review scores
Publication	Score
Eurogamer	8/10
GameSpot	2.5/10
IGN	2.5/10

Mr. Driller Online received negative reviews from critics due to the game's "broken" and laggy online mode, lack of local multiplayer, and fuzzy character sprites. GameSpot reviewer Don Francis recommended to avoid this title due to its shallow single-player campaign and a broken online mode. IGN's Ryan Geddes had the problems with online multiplayer, freezing his Xbox 360 completely, which forced him to shut the system off and restart.

GameSpot nominated Mr. Driller Online for the dubious award of Flat-Out Worst Game in its 2008 video game awards.
