= Mr. Driller Drill Land =

2002 video game

- Developer: Namco (Project Driller)
- Publishers: Namco; Remaster; Bandai Namco Entertainment
- Director: Hiroyuki Onoda
- Producer: Hideo Yoshizawa
- Designers: Hiroyuki Onoda; Koji Inokuchi
- Composer: Go Shiina
- Series: Mr. Driller
- Platforms: GameCube; Nintendo Switch; Windows; PlayStation 4; PlayStation 5; Xbox One; Xbox Series X/S
- Release: GameCube: JP: December 20, 2002; Nintendo Switch, Windows, WW: June 25, 2020; PlayStation 4, PlayStation 5, Xbox One, Xbox Series X/S: WW: November 4, 2021
- Genre: Puzzle
- Modes: Single-player, multiplayer

Mr. Driller Drill Land (Note: Japanese: ミスタードリラードリルランド, Hepburn: Misutā Dorirā Doriru Rando) (Note: The Switch/Windows version is titled Mr. Driller Encore (ミスタードリラーアンコール) in Japan.) is a 2002 puzzle video game developed and published in Japan by Namco for the GameCube. It is the fifth entry in the Mr. Driller video game series, and the second developed for a Nintendo platform following Mr. Driller A. Controlling one of seven characters, the player must make it to the bottom of each stage by destroying colored blocks, which can connect to each other and form chain reactions. The game is divided into five different modes themed as amusement park attractions, which feature new mechanics such as enemies, items and different block types.

Development of the game was by Project Driller, the internal development group behind the series. The soundtrack was composed by Go Shiina and was the last Mr. Driller title he worked on. A prototype game featuring four-person multiplayer was shown off at a Nintendo press conference, titled Shin Mr. Driller, and intended for a fall 2002 release in Japan. It was later delayed to winter of that year after being shown at the 2002 Tokyo Game Show, where it was given its final title of Drill Land. The game features support for the GameCube - Game Boy Advance link cable, allowing the player to import their "Pacteria" pets from Mr. Driller A into the game.

Mr. Driller Drill Land was met with a positive response from critics, who applauded the game's overall presentation, amount of content, multiplayer and graphics, some calling it one of the best Mr. Driller games and one of the best puzzle games for the GameCube. It was followed by Mr. Driller Drill Spirits for the Nintendo DS in 2004. A high-definition remaster for the Nintendo Switch and Windows was released internationally on June 25, 2020. Versions for the PlayStation 4, PlayStation 5, Xbox One, and Xbox Series X/S, were released on November 4, 2021.

== Gameplay ==
Screenshot from the game, showing the Hole of Druaga gamemode

Mr. Driller Drill Land is a puzzle video game where the player controls one of seven different characters who make it to the bottom of the stage by destroying formations of colored blocks that litter the playfield. Blocks of the same color will connect to each other if touching, and will be destroyed when four or more are connected, which can be used to cause chain reactions. The player has an oxygen meter at the right-hand side of the screen that constantly depletes as the stage progresses — collecting small air capsules found within the stage will replenish 20% of the player's oxygen, while destroying brown "X-Blocks" will deplete 20% of their oxygen. Unsupported blocks will fall, which can crush the player if under it.

Drill Land introduces five gameplay modes, themed as "attractions" in an amusement park. Upon selecting one, the player can select the difficulty of the stage before progressing to the main game. Completing an attraction will award the player with a stamp, and collecting all five stamps from each ride will allow the player to engage in a boss fight with Dr. Manhole in the middle of the park, which when defeated will unlock the next level. The five game modes include: Drill Land World Tour, which has the standard Mr. Driller gameplay, The Hole of Druaga, a parody of Namco's own The Tower of Druaga where the player needs to retrieve a key to open a door, Horror Night House, where the player needs to inject ghost-filled blocks with Holy water, Drindy Adventure, which features traps such as rolling boulders and spikes, and Star Driller, based on the Space Stage in Mr. Driller G featuring flashing "Star Blocks" that disappear after a brief moment.

Alongside the five attractions, the player can visit a night-time parade featuring many of the game's characters marching. Completing any of the game's attractions will award currency, which can be used in a gift shop to purchase power-ups, souvenirs and trading cards with the characters printed on them. The game features support for the GameCube - Game Boy Advance link cable peripheral, which allows the player to import their "Pacteria" digital pets from Mr. Driller A into the game's parade or purchase exclusive power-up items.

== Development and release ==
Mr. Driller Drill Land was released exclusively for the GameCube in Japan by Namco on December 20, 2002. Development was headed by Project Driller, the internal development group behind the Mr. Driller series, and was the last entry in the franchise composed by Go Shiina. The game was known in development as Shin Mr. Driller, known as New Mr. Driller in English, and intended for a fall 2002 release. A prototype version showcasing four-person multiplayer was presented to Nintendo during a press conference, which was part of an established collaboration between Nintendo and Namco for the GameCube, and scheduled to be released in November. The game was presented at the 2002 Tokyo Game Show, under the final title of Mr. Driller Drill Land, being delayed to a winter 2002 release.

A high-definition remaster of Drill Land for both PC and the Nintendo Switch was released in June 2020. The remaster features enhanced graphics and an additional Casual mode for beginner players. It is the third game released under the company's Encore line, following remasters of Katamari Damacy and Kotoba no Puzzle: Mojipittan. Versions for Xbox One, Xbox Series X/S, PlayStation 4 and PlayStation 5 were released on November 4, 2021.

== Reception ==
Reception

Review scores
Publication	Score
Famitsu	30/40
Cube (AUS)	8.8/10
GamesTM	8/10

Mr. Driller Drill Land was met with a positive critical response, some calling it one of the best games in the series and one of the best puzzle games for the GameCube. Japanese publication Famitsu awarded it the "Gold Hall of Fame" award based on four reviews, while UK magazine GamesTM listed it among the top twenty best GameCube games of all time. The remastered version holds an 81/100 on the aggregator website Metacritic, indicating "generally favorable reviews".

Critics applauded the game's presentation and amount of content. GAME Watch said the amount of content and overall presentation added a lot of replay value to the game for their interesting premise and gameplay mechanics. GamesTM called it "easily the GameCube's best puzzle game" for its colorful visuals and surplus amount of content, saying that the shopping system helped break up the action. They also thought the addition of new gameplay modes helped make the game feel more modern compared to earlier entries. Cube magazine praised the game's graphics, originality and large amount of collectibles, labeling it "a puzzle game for the more hands-on type of person". They also praised the amount of gamemodes, finding The Hole of Druaga to be the "cleverest" of the attractions.

Several also praised the multiple gamemodes, graphics, multiplayer and soundtrack. GAME Watch liked the game's four-player multiplayer for its intense and addictive gameplay, and for adding a new layer of replay value to the overall game. They also heavily praised its "gorgeous" music and sound effects, which GamesTM agreed with. GamesTM also added that the soundtrack adds to the game's action and style. Cube highly praised the game's multiplayer aspect and challenge for increasing both the replay value and appeal. Engadget listed it among the ten best exclusive GameCube games, saying its "undeniably adorable" and amount of content helps it stand out from other games in the series. Retronauts called it "the ultimate Driller experience", recommending it to players who have tried out previous Mr. Driller installments.
