= (119070) 2001 KP77 =

Trans-Neptunian object

(119070) 2001 KP_{77}
Discovery
- Discovered by: M. W. Buie
- Discovery site: Cerro Tololo Obs.
- Discovery date: 23 May 2001

Designations
- Minor planet category: TNO · res (4:7)

Orbital characteristics
- Epoch 1 July 2021 (JD 2459396.5)
- Uncertainty parameter 3 · 4
- Observation arc: 3.97 yr (1,449 d)
- Aphelion: 51.855 AU
- Perihelion: 36.095 AU
- Semi-major axis: 43.975 AU
- Eccentricity: 0.1792
- Orbital period (sidereal): 291.62 yr (106,514 d)
- Mean anomaly: 23.170°
- Mean motion: 0° 0^{m} 12.24^{s} / day
- Inclination: 3.3179°
- Longitude of ascending node: 22.164°
- Argument of perihelion: 219.65°

Physical characteristics
- Mean diameter: 176 km (est. at 0.09)
- Spectral type: B–R = 1.720±0.319
- Apparent magnitude: 22.8
- Absolute magnitude (H): 7.0

(119070) 2001 KP_{77} is a resonant trans-Neptunian object in the Kuiper belt, a circumstellar disc located in the outermost region of the Solar System. It was discovered on 23 May 2001, by American astronomer Marc Buie at the Cerro Tololo Observatory in Chile.

The object is locked in a 4:7 orbital resonance with Neptune. It has a red surface color and measures approximately 176 kilometers (110 miles) in diameter.

== Discovery ==
2001 KP_{77} was first observed near its perihelion on 23 May 2001, using the 4-meter Blanco Telescope at Cerro Tololo Inter-American Observatory in Chile. During the same night, 2001 KN_{77}, 2001 KO_{77}, and 2001 KQ_{77} were also discovered. Besides Marc Buie, who is solely credited with the discovery of this object, the Minor Planet Electronic Circular also mentions James Elliot, Lawrence Wasserman, Robert Millis and Susan Kern as observers and measurers, respectively. Follow-up observations with the 6.5-meter Baade Telescope (Magellan) at the Las Campanas Observatory were made three weeks later. The body's observation arc begins with its official discovery observation at Cerro Tololo on 23 May 2001.

== Orbit and classification ==
This minor planet orbits the Sun at a distance of 36.1–51.9 AU once every 291 years and 7 months (106,514 days; semi-major axis of 43.98 AU). Its orbit has an eccentricity of 0.18 and an inclination of 3° with respect to the ecliptic. The object came to perihelion in 2002. As of 2021, it is 37.0 AU from the Sun and has an apparent magnitude of 22.8.

2001 KP_{77} is a resonant trans-Neptunian object that stays in a 4:7 mean-motion orbital resonance with Neptune, orbiting exactly four times the Sun for every seven orbits Neptune does. The classification is deemed secure. The 4:7 resonance is located at 43.7 AU in the midst of the classical objects of the Kuiper belt, a circumstellar disc of typically non-resonant bodies, contrary to the more prominent resonant plutinos (2:3) and twotinos (1:2) which form the inner and outer rim of the Kuiper belt, respectively.

== Numbering and naming ==
This minor planet was numbered by the Minor Planet Center on 16 November 2005, receiving the number 119070 in the minor planet catalog (M.P.C. 55533). As of 2025, it has not been named. According to the established naming conventions, it will be given a mythological name associated with the underworld or with creation.

== Physical characteristics ==
This object has a red surface color, with a high B−R color index of 1.720±0.319 in the visible part of the spectrum. A red surface color is typically associated with the presence of tholins, polymer-like organic compounds, formed by long exposures to solar and cosmic radiation. A higher B−R magnitude of 1.980±0.229 including B−V and V−R color indices of 1.544 and 0.574, respectively, were previously published in 2004.

Based on a generic magnitude-to-diameter conversion, 2001 KP_{77} measures approximately 176 kilometers (110 miles) in diameter, for an assumed albedo of 0.9 and a magnitude of 7.0. According to Mike Brown, who estimates a mean diameter of 113 km (70 mi), the object is too small for being considered a dwarf planet candidate ("probably not"). As of 2021, no rotational lightcurve for this body has been obtained from photometric observations. Its rotation period, pole and shape, as well as its composition remain unknown.
