= List of minor planets: 119001–120000 =

The following is a partial list of minor planets, running from minor-planet number 119001 through 120000, inclusive. The primary data for this and other partial lists is based on JPL's "Small-Body Orbital Elements" and data available from the Minor Planet Center. Critical list information is also provided by the MPC, unless otherwise specified from Lowell Observatory. A detailed description of the table's columns and additional sources are given on the main page including a complete list of every page in this series, and a statistical break-up on the dynamical classification of minor planets.

Also see the summary list of all named bodies in numerical and alphabetical order, and the corresponding naming citations for the number range of this particular list. New namings may only be added to this list after official publication, as the preannouncement of names is condemned by the Working Group for Small Bodies Nomenclature of the International Astronomical Union.

Near-Earth obj.	MBA (inner)	MBA (outer)	Centaur
Mars-crosser	MBA (middle)	Jupiter trojan	Trans-Neptunian obj.
Unclassified

== 119001–119100 ==
Designation			Discovery			Properties		Ref
Permanent	Provisional	Named after	Date	Site	Discoverer(s)	Category	Diam.	Ref
119001	2000 YX_{60}	—	December 30, 2000	Socorro	LINEAR	·	5.4 km	MPC · JPL
119002	2000 YW_{61}	—	December 30, 2000	Socorro	LINEAR	·	9.7 km	MPC · JPL
119003	2000 YF_{69}	—	December 30, 2000	Socorro	LINEAR	·	3.0 km	MPC · JPL
119004	2000 YK_{69}	—	December 30, 2000	Socorro	LINEAR	·	5.2 km	MPC · JPL
119005	2000 YP_{72}	—	December 30, 2000	Socorro	LINEAR	·	6.2 km	MPC · JPL
119006	2000 YG_{75}	—	December 30, 2000	Socorro	LINEAR	·	6.5 km	MPC · JPL
119007	2000 YT_{75}	—	December 30, 2000	Socorro	LINEAR	·	3.8 km	MPC · JPL
119008	2000 YH_{79}	—	December 30, 2000	Socorro	LINEAR	·	7.6 km	MPC · JPL
119009	2000 YY_{79}	—	December 30, 2000	Socorro	LINEAR	·	4.7 km	MPC · JPL
119010	2000 YC_{80}	—	December 30, 2000	Socorro	LINEAR	VER	5.3 km	MPC · JPL
119011	2000 YN_{82}	—	December 30, 2000	Socorro	LINEAR	·	6.1 km	MPC · JPL
119012	2000 YK_{105}	—	December 28, 2000	Socorro	LINEAR	H	1.2 km	MPC · JPL
119013	2000 YM_{121}	—	December 22, 2000	Socorro	LINEAR	·	6.5 km	MPC · JPL
119014	2000 YA_{124}	—	December 28, 2000	Haleakala	NEAT	·	3.8 km	MPC · JPL
119015	2000 YX_{136}	—	December 23, 2000	Socorro	LINEAR	TIR	5.7 km	MPC · JPL
119016	2001 AD_{5}	—	January 2, 2001	Socorro	LINEAR	·	8.3 km	MPC · JPL
119017	2001 AE_{27}	—	January 5, 2001	Socorro	LINEAR	EMA	7.9 km	MPC · JPL
119018	2001 AQ_{27}	—	January 5, 2001	Socorro	LINEAR	H	1.1 km	MPC · JPL
119019	2001 AJ_{35}	—	January 5, 2001	Socorro	LINEAR	·	5.3 km	MPC · JPL
119020	2001 AH_{38}	—	January 5, 2001	Socorro	LINEAR	·	7.3 km	MPC · JPL
119021	2001 AL_{43}	—	January 4, 2001	Anderson Mesa	LONEOS	·	4.3 km	MPC · JPL
119022	2001 AU_{46}	—	January 15, 2001	Socorro	LINEAR	H	950 m	MPC · JPL
119023	2001 BW_{2}	—	January 18, 2001	Socorro	LINEAR	H	960 m	MPC · JPL
119024	2001 BX_{18}	—	January 19, 2001	Socorro	LINEAR	·	5.2 km	MPC · JPL
119025	2001 BG_{30}	—	January 20, 2001	Socorro	LINEAR	HYG · fast	5.2 km	MPC · JPL
119026	2001 BC_{61}	—	January 26, 2001	Socorro	LINEAR	H	1.2 km	MPC · JPL
119027	2001 CQ_{2}	—	February 1, 2001	Socorro	LINEAR	·	6.6 km	MPC · JPL
119028	2001 CB_{33}	—	February 13, 2001	Socorro	LINEAR	·	4.1 km	MPC · JPL
119029	2001 CV_{39}	—	February 13, 2001	Socorro	LINEAR	·	3.4 km	MPC · JPL
119030	2001 DO_{8}	—	February 16, 2001	Oizumi	T. Kobayashi	·	7.9 km	MPC · JPL
119031	2001 DQ_{24}	—	February 17, 2001	Socorro	LINEAR	·	4.3 km	MPC · JPL
119032	2001 DC_{44}	—	February 19, 2001	Socorro	LINEAR	EOS	3.6 km	MPC · JPL
119033	2001 EU_{12}	—	March 13, 2001	Socorro	LINEAR	EUP	9.4 km	MPC · JPL
119034	2001 FR	—	March 16, 2001	Socorro	LINEAR	·	7.3 km	MPC · JPL
119035	2001 FD_{23}	—	March 21, 2001	Anderson Mesa	LONEOS	THM	5.8 km	MPC · JPL
119036	2001 FQ_{34}	—	March 18, 2001	Socorro	LINEAR	·	7.2 km	MPC · JPL
119037	2001 FH_{50}	—	March 18, 2001	Socorro	LINEAR	·	1.5 km	MPC · JPL
119038	2001 FE_{87}	—	March 21, 2001	Anderson Mesa	LONEOS	HYG	6.5 km	MPC · JPL
119039	2001 FZ_{91}	—	March 16, 2001	Socorro	LINEAR	T_{j} (2.93)	10 km	MPC · JPL
119040	2001 FH_{105}	—	March 18, 2001	Socorro	LINEAR	·	7.2 km	MPC · JPL
119041	2001 FP_{145}	—	March 24, 2001	Kitt Peak	Spacewatch	·	5.9 km	MPC · JPL
119042	2001 HS_{1}	—	April 17, 2001	Socorro	LINEAR	·	1.3 km	MPC · JPL
119043	2001 HS_{4}	—	April 16, 2001	Socorro	LINEAR	PHO	5.4 km	MPC · JPL
119044	2001 HV_{7}	—	April 18, 2001	Kitt Peak	Spacewatch	·	1.5 km	MPC · JPL
119045	2001 HN_{8}	—	April 21, 2001	Socorro	LINEAR	PHO	1.7 km	MPC · JPL
119046	2001 HL_{11}	—	April 18, 2001	Socorro	LINEAR	·	1.2 km	MPC · JPL
119047	2001 HM_{12}	—	April 18, 2001	Socorro	LINEAR	·	1.4 km	MPC · JPL
119048	2001 HQ_{29}	—	April 27, 2001	Socorro	LINEAR	·	1.3 km	MPC · JPL
119049	2001 HB_{63}	—	April 26, 2001	Anderson Mesa	LONEOS	·	1.9 km	MPC · JPL
119050	2001 HA_{67}	—	April 27, 2001	Kitt Peak	Spacewatch	·	1.2 km	MPC · JPL
119051	2001 JK_{5}	—	May 14, 2001	Kitt Peak	Spacewatch	·	1.5 km	MPC · JPL
119052	2001 KZ	—	May 17, 2001	Socorro	LINEAR	·	1.3 km	MPC · JPL
119053	2001 KR_{11}	—	May 18, 2001	Socorro	LINEAR	·	1.9 km	MPC · JPL
119054	2001 KY_{11}	—	May 18, 2001	Socorro	LINEAR	slow	1.7 km	MPC · JPL
119055	2001 KN_{12}	—	May 18, 2001	Socorro	LINEAR	·	1.3 km	MPC · JPL
119056	2001 KL_{13}	—	May 18, 2001	Socorro	LINEAR	·	3.0 km	MPC · JPL
119057	2001 KT_{19}	—	May 22, 2001	Socorro	LINEAR	·	1.2 km	MPC · JPL
119058	2001 KT_{24}	—	May 17, 2001	Socorro	LINEAR	·	1.3 km	MPC · JPL
119059	2001 KP_{25}	—	May 17, 2001	Socorro	LINEAR	·	1.5 km	MPC · JPL
119060	2001 KM_{42}	—	May 21, 2001	Socorro	LINEAR	·	1.5 km	MPC · JPL
119061	2001 KP_{42}	—	May 22, 2001	Socorro	LINEAR	·	1.8 km	MPC · JPL
119062	2001 KC_{43}	—	May 22, 2001	Socorro	LINEAR	·	1.5 km	MPC · JPL
119063	2001 KF_{49}	—	May 24, 2001	Socorro	LINEAR	NYS	2.6 km	MPC · JPL
119064	2001 KO_{52}	—	May 18, 2001	Anderson Mesa	LONEOS	·	1.3 km	MPC · JPL
119065	2001 KB_{72}	—	May 24, 2001	Socorro	LINEAR	·	1.0 km	MPC · JPL
119066	2001 KJ_{76}	—	May 23, 2001	Cerro Tololo	M. W. Buie	res · 4:7 · critical	186 km	MPC · JPL
119067	2001 KP_{76}	—	May 23, 2001	Cerro Tololo	M. W. Buie	res · 4:7 · moon · critical	203 km	MPC · JPL
119068	2001 KC_{77}	—	May 23, 2001	Cerro Tololo	M. W. Buie	res · 2:5 · critical	184 km	MPC · JPL
119069	2001 KN_{77}	—	May 23, 2001	Cerro Tololo	M. W. Buie	plutino · critical	160 km	MPC · JPL
119070	2001 KP_{77}	—	May 23, 2001	Cerro Tololo	M. W. Buie	res · 4:7 · critical	146 km	MPC · JPL
119071	2001 LC_{1}	—	June 13, 2001	Socorro	LINEAR	·	1.9 km	MPC · JPL
119072	2001 LF_{4}	—	June 13, 2001	Socorro	LINEAR	·	1.8 km	MPC · JPL
119073	2001 LD_{9}	—	June 15, 2001	Socorro	LINEAR	·	1.6 km	MPC · JPL
119074	2001 LC_{15}	—	June 11, 2001	Anderson Mesa	LONEOS	·	1.2 km	MPC · JPL
119075	2001 LK_{15}	—	June 11, 2001	Kitt Peak	Spacewatch	·	1.5 km	MPC · JPL
119076	2001 LE_{19}	—	June 15, 2001	Socorro	LINEAR	·	1.6 km	MPC · JPL
119077	2001 MQ_{8}	—	June 16, 2001	Palomar	NEAT	·	1.9 km	MPC · JPL
119078	2001 MA_{9}	—	June 19, 2001	Palomar	NEAT	·	1.8 km	MPC · JPL
119079	2001 MA_{17}	—	June 27, 2001	Palomar	NEAT	·	1.6 km	MPC · JPL
119080	2001 MG_{28}	—	June 24, 2001	Socorro	LINEAR	·	2.1 km	MPC · JPL
119081	2001 NR_{3}	—	July 13, 2001	Palomar	NEAT	·	1.5 km	MPC · JPL
119082	2001 NR_{4}	—	July 13, 2001	Palomar	NEAT	NYS	1.1 km	MPC · JPL
119083	2001 NT_{9}	—	July 15, 2001	Ondřejov	L. Kotková	NYS	1.6 km	MPC · JPL
119084	2001 NH_{10}	—	July 14, 2001	Palomar	NEAT	·	1.4 km	MPC · JPL
119085	2001 NW_{15}	—	July 14, 2001	Palomar	NEAT	·	2.2 km	MPC · JPL
119086	2001 NR_{19}	—	July 12, 2001	Haleakala	NEAT	NYS	2.0 km	MPC · JPL
119087	2001 NK_{21}	—	July 14, 2001	Palomar	NEAT	·	2.7 km	MPC · JPL
119088	2001 NP_{21}	—	July 14, 2001	Palomar	NEAT	V	1.2 km	MPC · JPL
119089	2001 NR_{21}	—	July 14, 2001	Palomar	NEAT	·	2.3 km	MPC · JPL
119090	2001 OU_{1}	—	July 18, 2001	Palomar	NEAT	·	1.6 km	MPC · JPL
119091	2001 OG_{9}	—	July 20, 2001	Anderson Mesa	LONEOS	·	2.5 km	MPC · JPL
119092	2001 OU_{10}	—	July 19, 2001	Palomar	NEAT	·	2.0 km	MPC · JPL
119093	2001 OR_{18}	—	July 17, 2001	Haleakala	NEAT	V	1.1 km	MPC · JPL
119094	2001 OO_{24}	—	July 16, 2001	Anderson Mesa	LONEOS	·	1.2 km	MPC · JPL
119095	2001 OE_{25}	—	July 17, 2001	Anderson Mesa	LONEOS	V	1.2 km	MPC · JPL
119096	2001 OT_{28}	—	July 18, 2001	Palomar	NEAT	·	2.6 km	MPC · JPL
119097	2001 OX_{34}	—	July 19, 2001	Palomar	NEAT	V	1.4 km	MPC · JPL
119098	2001 OD_{35}	—	July 20, 2001	Palomar	NEAT	·	2.1 km	MPC · JPL
119099	2001 OR_{40}	—	July 20, 2001	Palomar	NEAT	V	1.1 km	MPC · JPL
119100	2001 OZ_{41}	—	July 22, 2001	Palomar	NEAT	·	2.1 km	MPC · JPL

== 119101–119200 ==
back to top

Designation			Discovery			Properties		Ref
Permanent	Provisional	Named after	Date	Site	Discoverer(s)	Category	Diam.	Ref
119101	2001 OG_{47}	—	July 16, 2001	Anderson Mesa	LONEOS	·	2.3 km	MPC · JPL
119102	2001 OB_{49}	—	July 16, 2001	Haleakala	NEAT	ERI	5.6 km	MPC · JPL
119103	2001 OM_{51}	—	July 21, 2001	Palomar	NEAT	·	2.0 km	MPC · JPL
119104	2001 ON_{53}	—	July 21, 2001	Palomar	NEAT	V · fast	1.1 km	MPC · JPL
119105	2001 OM_{56}	—	July 26, 2001	Palomar	NEAT	V	1.4 km	MPC · JPL
119106	2001 OU_{56}	—	July 16, 2001	Anderson Mesa	LONEOS	·	2.3 km	MPC · JPL
119107	2001 OX_{56}	—	July 16, 2001	Anderson Mesa	LONEOS	NYS	2.0 km	MPC · JPL
119108	2001 OC_{64}	—	July 23, 2001	Haleakala	NEAT	·	1.7 km	MPC · JPL
119109	2001 OZ_{64}	—	July 19, 2001	Haleakala	NEAT	·	3.3 km	MPC · JPL
119110	2001 OT_{70}	—	July 19, 2001	Palomar	NEAT	MAS	1.5 km	MPC · JPL
119111	2001 OK_{71}	—	July 20, 2001	Palomar	NEAT	NYS	2.6 km	MPC · JPL
119112	2001 OV_{75}	—	July 25, 2001	Palomar	NEAT	·	2.2 km	MPC · JPL
119113	2001 OE_{77}	—	July 28, 2001	Ondřejov	P. Pravec	·	1.5 km	MPC · JPL
119114	2001 OY_{77}	—	July 26, 2001	Palomar	NEAT	·	3.5 km	MPC · JPL
119115	2001 OJ_{80}	—	July 29, 2001	Palomar	NEAT	·	1.7 km	MPC · JPL
119116	2001 OB_{81}	—	July 29, 2001	Socorro	LINEAR	PHO	3.9 km	MPC · JPL
119117	2001 OB_{82}	—	July 26, 2001	Haleakala	NEAT	MAS	1.5 km	MPC · JPL
119118	2001 OG_{85}	—	July 20, 2001	Anderson Mesa	LONEOS	·	920 m	MPC · JPL
119119	2001 OP_{86}	—	July 28, 2001	Haleakala	NEAT	·	2.3 km	MPC · JPL
119120	2001 OM_{87}	—	July 29, 2001	Palomar	NEAT	·	2.5 km	MPC · JPL
119121	2001 OD_{88}	—	July 20, 2001	Haleakala	NEAT	ERI	3.7 km	MPC · JPL
119122	2001 OU_{89}	—	July 23, 2001	Haleakala	NEAT	·	1.5 km	MPC · JPL
119123	2001 OQ_{90}	—	July 25, 2001	Haleakala	NEAT	·	1.4 km	MPC · JPL
119124	2001 OB_{99}	—	July 27, 2001	Anderson Mesa	LONEOS	PHO	1.8 km	MPC · JPL
119125	2001 OW_{99}	—	July 27, 2001	Anderson Mesa	LONEOS	·	1.5 km	MPC · JPL
119126	2001 OK_{101}	—	July 28, 2001	Anderson Mesa	LONEOS	V	1.3 km	MPC · JPL
119127	2001 OT_{101}	—	July 28, 2001	Anderson Mesa	LONEOS	·	1.3 km	MPC · JPL
119128	2001 OY_{101}	—	July 28, 2001	Haleakala	NEAT	·	2.0 km	MPC · JPL
119129	2001 OL_{111}	—	July 16, 2001	Anderson Mesa	LONEOS	MAS	1.0 km	MPC · JPL
119130	2001 OT_{111}	—	July 27, 2001	Anderson Mesa	LONEOS	NYS	2.2 km	MPC · JPL
119131	2001 PN	—	August 1, 2001	Palomar	NEAT	·	1.5 km	MPC · JPL
119132	2001 PS_{1}	—	August 8, 2001	Palomar	NEAT	MAS	1.4 km	MPC · JPL
119133	2001 PX_{1}	—	August 8, 2001	Haleakala	NEAT	·	1.3 km	MPC · JPL
119134	2001 PA_{5}	—	August 8, 2001	Haleakala	NEAT	V	980 m	MPC · JPL
119135	2001 PZ_{9}	—	August 8, 2001	Haleakala	NEAT	·	1.7 km	MPC · JPL
119136	2001 PC_{12}	—	August 11, 2001	Haleakala	NEAT	V	1.6 km	MPC · JPL
119137	2001 PF_{12}	—	August 11, 2001	Haleakala	NEAT	·	2.6 km	MPC · JPL
119138	2001 PS_{15}	—	August 9, 2001	Palomar	NEAT	·	2.4 km	MPC · JPL
119139	2001 PY_{17}	—	August 9, 2001	Palomar	NEAT	·	1.9 km	MPC · JPL
119140	2001 PS_{24}	—	August 11, 2001	Haleakala	NEAT	·	3.8 km	MPC · JPL
119141	2001 PX_{25}	—	August 11, 2001	Haleakala	NEAT	·	2.3 km	MPC · JPL
119142	2001 PL_{27}	—	August 11, 2001	Haleakala	NEAT	·	2.0 km	MPC · JPL
119143	2001 PX_{27}	—	August 13, 2001	Haleakala	NEAT	NYS	1.8 km	MPC · JPL
119144	2001 PH_{32}	—	August 10, 2001	Palomar	NEAT	·	2.5 km	MPC · JPL
119145	2001 PS_{41}	—	August 11, 2001	Palomar	NEAT	PHO	2.1 km	MPC · JPL
119146	2001 PQ_{45}	—	August 12, 2001	Palomar	NEAT	·	1.8 km	MPC · JPL
119147	2001 PF_{47}	—	August 14, 2001	Bergisch Gladbach	W. Bickel	PHO	2.2 km	MPC · JPL
119148	2001 PS_{49}	—	August 14, 2001	Palomar	NEAT	·	3.3 km	MPC · JPL
119149	2001 PY_{55}	—	August 14, 2001	Haleakala	NEAT	NYS	1.9 km	MPC · JPL
119150	2001 PR_{60}	—	August 13, 2001	Haleakala	NEAT	NYS	2.1 km	MPC · JPL
119151	2001 PW_{61}	—	August 13, 2001	Haleakala	NEAT	·	4.2 km	MPC · JPL
119152	2001 PB_{63}	—	August 13, 2001	Haleakala	NEAT	NYS	3.0 km	MPC · JPL
119153	2001 QH_{3}	—	August 16, 2001	Socorro	LINEAR	·	2.8 km	MPC · JPL
119154	2001 QS_{3}	—	August 16, 2001	Socorro	LINEAR	NYS	1.2 km	MPC · JPL
119155	2001 QJ_{7}	—	August 16, 2001	Socorro	LINEAR	·	2.1 km	MPC · JPL
119156	2001 QM_{7}	—	August 16, 2001	Socorro	LINEAR	·	1.6 km	MPC · JPL
119157	2001 QH_{9}	—	August 16, 2001	Socorro	LINEAR	·	2.4 km	MPC · JPL
119158	2001 QX_{21}	—	August 16, 2001	Socorro	LINEAR	·	1.9 km	MPC · JPL
119159	2001 QX_{22}	—	August 16, 2001	Socorro	LINEAR	·	2.6 km	MPC · JPL
119160	2001 QT_{23}	—	August 16, 2001	Socorro	LINEAR	NYS	2.1 km	MPC · JPL
119161	2001 QB_{24}	—	August 16, 2001	Socorro	LINEAR	·	2.1 km	MPC · JPL
119162	2001 QD_{26}	—	August 16, 2001	Socorro	LINEAR	NYS	1.8 km	MPC · JPL
119163	2001 QX_{26}	—	August 16, 2001	Socorro	LINEAR	·	4.7 km	MPC · JPL
119164	2001 QJ_{37}	—	August 16, 2001	Socorro	LINEAR	NYS	1.8 km	MPC · JPL
119165	2001 QJ_{38}	—	August 16, 2001	Socorro	LINEAR	·	2.9 km	MPC · JPL
119166	2001 QJ_{39}	—	August 16, 2001	Socorro	LINEAR	·	2.5 km	MPC · JPL
119167	2001 QX_{39}	—	August 16, 2001	Socorro	LINEAR	NYS	1.7 km	MPC · JPL
119168	2001 QK_{42}	—	August 16, 2001	Socorro	LINEAR	·	1.3 km	MPC · JPL
119169	2001 QM_{47}	—	August 16, 2001	Socorro	LINEAR	·	1.6 km	MPC · JPL
119170	2001 QO_{48}	—	August 16, 2001	Socorro	LINEAR	MAS	1.1 km	MPC · JPL
119171	2001 QH_{49}	—	August 16, 2001	Socorro	LINEAR	V	1.3 km	MPC · JPL
119172	2001 QJ_{49}	—	August 16, 2001	Socorro	LINEAR	MAS	1.2 km	MPC · JPL
119173	2001 QL_{49}	—	August 16, 2001	Socorro	LINEAR	·	2.4 km	MPC · JPL
119174	2001 QR_{51}	—	August 16, 2001	Socorro	LINEAR	·	1.6 km	MPC · JPL
119175	2001 QU_{53}	—	August 16, 2001	Socorro	LINEAR	NYS · slow	1.8 km	MPC · JPL
119176	2001 QS_{55}	—	August 16, 2001	Socorro	LINEAR	MAS	1.5 km	MPC · JPL
119177	2001 QN_{61}	—	August 16, 2001	Socorro	LINEAR	·	1.2 km	MPC · JPL
119178	2001 QW_{66}	—	August 17, 2001	Socorro	LINEAR	·	2.3 km	MPC · JPL
119179	2001 QM_{67}	—	August 19, 2001	Socorro	LINEAR	NYS	1.6 km	MPC · JPL
119180	2001 QN_{68}	—	August 20, 2001	Oakley	Wolfe, C.	·	3.5 km	MPC · JPL
119181	2001 QX_{68}	—	August 17, 2001	Socorro	LINEAR	·	2.1 km	MPC · JPL
119182	2001 QZ_{80}	—	August 17, 2001	Socorro	LINEAR	·	3.0 km	MPC · JPL
119183	2001 QV_{82}	—	August 17, 2001	Socorro	LINEAR	·	1.9 km	MPC · JPL
119184	2001 QK_{87}	—	August 17, 2001	Palomar	NEAT	·	3.8 km	MPC · JPL
119185	2001 QJ_{88}	—	August 21, 2001	Kitt Peak	Spacewatch	NYS	1.2 km	MPC · JPL
119186	2001 QM_{93}	—	August 22, 2001	Socorro	LINEAR	(5)	2.8 km	MPC · JPL
119187	2001 QA_{94}	—	August 22, 2001	Socorro	LINEAR	·	2.5 km	MPC · JPL
119188	2001 QO_{97}	—	August 17, 2001	Socorro	LINEAR	·	2.7 km	MPC · JPL
119189	2001 QO_{102}	—	August 19, 2001	Socorro	LINEAR	NYS	2.1 km	MPC · JPL
119190	2001 QC_{104}	—	August 20, 2001	Socorro	LINEAR	·	1.8 km	MPC · JPL
119191	2001 QO_{104}	—	August 22, 2001	Socorro	LINEAR	V	1.3 km	MPC · JPL
119192	2001 QM_{106}	—	August 23, 2001	Anderson Mesa	LONEOS	·	1.7 km	MPC · JPL
119193	2001 QH_{108}	—	August 23, 2001	Desert Eagle	W. K. Y. Yeung	·	2.2 km	MPC · JPL
119194	2001 QH_{109}	—	August 20, 2001	Palomar	NEAT	·	2.2 km	MPC · JPL
119195 Margaretgreer	2001 QF_{111}	Margaretgreer	August 25, 2001	Emerald Lane	L. Ball	·	2.0 km	MPC · JPL
119196	2001 QZ_{112}	—	August 25, 2001	Socorro	LINEAR	·	4.9 km	MPC · JPL
119197	2001 QU_{118}	—	August 17, 2001	Socorro	LINEAR	·	2.5 km	MPC · JPL
119198	2001 QN_{121}	—	August 19, 2001	Socorro	LINEAR	·	2.0 km	MPC · JPL
119199	2001 QP_{121}	—	August 19, 2001	Socorro	LINEAR	·	1.9 km	MPC · JPL
119200	2001 QV_{124}	—	August 19, 2001	Socorro	LINEAR	·	1.6 km	MPC · JPL

== 119201–119300 ==
back to top

Designation			Discovery			Properties		Ref
Permanent	Provisional	Named after	Date	Site	Discoverer(s)	Category	Diam.	Ref
119201	2001 QL_{126}	—	August 20, 2001	Socorro	LINEAR	V	1.3 km	MPC · JPL
119202	2001 QN_{128}	—	August 20, 2001	Socorro	LINEAR	fast	2.2 km	MPC · JPL
119203	2001 QU_{128}	—	August 20, 2001	Socorro	LINEAR	V	1.3 km	MPC · JPL
119204	2001 QV_{128}	—	August 20, 2001	Socorro	LINEAR	·	1.5 km	MPC · JPL
119205	2001 QN_{141}	—	August 24, 2001	Socorro	LINEAR	MAS	1.3 km	MPC · JPL
119206	2001 QW_{145}	—	August 25, 2001	Kitt Peak	Spacewatch	NYS	2.1 km	MPC · JPL
119207	2001 QB_{149}	—	August 21, 2001	Haleakala	NEAT	NYS	2.0 km	MPC · JPL
119208	2001 QJ_{156}	—	August 23, 2001	Anderson Mesa	LONEOS	·	1.7 km	MPC · JPL
119209	2001 QC_{159}	—	August 23, 2001	Anderson Mesa	LONEOS	·	2.2 km	MPC · JPL
119210	2001 QF_{160}	—	August 23, 2001	Anderson Mesa	LONEOS	MAS	1.2 km	MPC · JPL
119211	2001 QD_{161}	—	August 23, 2001	Anderson Mesa	LONEOS	·	1.8 km	MPC · JPL
119212	2001 QY_{166}	—	August 24, 2001	Haleakala	NEAT	·	2.3 km	MPC · JPL
119213	2001 QF_{168}	—	August 25, 2001	Haleakala	NEAT	·	1.2 km	MPC · JPL
119214	2001 QS_{173}	—	August 25, 2001	Socorro	LINEAR	·	2.0 km	MPC · JPL
119215	2001 QX_{188}	—	August 22, 2001	Kitt Peak	Spacewatch	·	1.9 km	MPC · JPL
119216	2001 QO_{191}	—	August 22, 2001	Haleakala	NEAT	V	1.0 km	MPC · JPL
119217	2001 QV_{200}	—	August 22, 2001	Socorro	LINEAR	·	2.8 km	MPC · JPL
119218	2001 QV_{210}	—	August 23, 2001	Anderson Mesa	LONEOS	·	2.5 km	MPC · JPL
119219	2001 QJ_{211}	—	August 23, 2001	Anderson Mesa	LONEOS	NYS	1.8 km	MPC · JPL
119220	2001 QL_{211}	—	August 23, 2001	Anderson Mesa	LONEOS	·	2.4 km	MPC · JPL
119221	2001 QS_{214}	—	August 23, 2001	Anderson Mesa	LONEOS	MAS	1.3 km	MPC · JPL
119222	2001 QD_{219}	—	August 23, 2001	Anderson Mesa	LONEOS	·	1.6 km	MPC · JPL
119223	2001 QB_{220}	—	August 23, 2001	Socorro	LINEAR	EUN	2.4 km	MPC · JPL
119224	2001 QE_{223}	—	August 24, 2001	Anderson Mesa	LONEOS	·	1.4 km	MPC · JPL
119225	2001 QM_{223}	—	August 24, 2001	Anderson Mesa	LONEOS	·	3.2 km	MPC · JPL
119226	2001 QB_{224}	—	August 24, 2001	Anderson Mesa	LONEOS	·	2.2 km	MPC · JPL
119227	2001 QD_{226}	—	August 24, 2001	Anderson Mesa	LONEOS	V	1.9 km	MPC · JPL
119228	2001 QZ_{226}	—	August 24, 2001	Anderson Mesa	LONEOS	·	2.5 km	MPC · JPL
119229	2001 QV_{232}	—	August 24, 2001	Socorro	LINEAR	·	1.6 km	MPC · JPL
119230	2001 QV_{236}	—	August 24, 2001	Socorro	LINEAR	NYS	2.0 km	MPC · JPL
119231	2001 QQ_{238}	—	August 24, 2001	Socorro	LINEAR	MAR	1.7 km	MPC · JPL
119232	2001 QA_{239}	—	August 24, 2001	Socorro	LINEAR	·	2.7 km	MPC · JPL
119233	2001 QZ_{243}	—	August 24, 2001	Socorro	LINEAR	·	3.4 km	MPC · JPL
119234	2001 QL_{255}	—	August 25, 2001	Socorro	LINEAR	·	2.1 km	MPC · JPL
119235	2001 QP_{261}	—	August 25, 2001	Socorro	LINEAR	·	2.6 km	MPC · JPL
119236	2001 QO_{271}	—	August 19, 2001	Socorro	LINEAR	·	1.5 km	MPC · JPL
119237	2001 QE_{275}	—	August 19, 2001	Socorro	LINEAR	(5)	2.9 km	MPC · JPL
119238	2001 QL_{277}	—	August 19, 2001	Socorro	LINEAR	·	2.3 km	MPC · JPL
119239	2001 QY_{277}	—	August 19, 2001	Socorro	LINEAR	·	5.1 km	MPC · JPL
119240	2001 QF_{278}	—	August 19, 2001	Socorro	LINEAR	·	3.0 km	MPC · JPL
119241	2001 QQ_{282}	—	August 19, 2001	Anderson Mesa	LONEOS	·	1.6 km	MPC · JPL
119242	2001 QL_{286}	—	August 17, 2001	Palomar	NEAT	·	2.2 km	MPC · JPL
119243	2001 QZ_{288}	—	August 16, 2001	Palomar	NEAT	fast	3.3 km	MPC · JPL
119244	2001 QL_{290}	—	August 16, 2001	Socorro	LINEAR	MAS	1.0 km	MPC · JPL
119245	2001 QD_{293}	—	August 26, 2001	Socorro	LINEAR	PHO	3.8 km	MPC · JPL
119246	2001 QH_{295}	—	August 24, 2001	Socorro	LINEAR	MAS	1.3 km	MPC · JPL
119247	2001 QX_{296}	—	August 24, 2001	Socorro	LINEAR	·	3.3 km	MPC · JPL
119248 Corbally	2001 RS_{10}	Corbally	September 10, 2001	Goodricke-Pigott	R. A. Tucker	·	1.9 km	MPC · JPL
119249	2001 RR_{14}	—	September 10, 2001	Socorro	LINEAR	MAS	1.6 km	MPC · JPL
119250	2001 RR_{15}	—	September 7, 2001	Socorro	LINEAR	·	3.2 km	MPC · JPL
119251	2001 RE_{20}	—	September 7, 2001	Socorro	LINEAR	·	2.3 km	MPC · JPL
119252	2001 RD_{21}	—	September 7, 2001	Socorro	LINEAR	·	2.4 km	MPC · JPL
119253	2001 RL_{24}	—	September 7, 2001	Socorro	LINEAR	MAS	1.1 km	MPC · JPL
119254	2001 RL_{28}	—	September 7, 2001	Socorro	LINEAR	fast	2.1 km	MPC · JPL
119255	2001 RP_{28}	—	September 7, 2001	Socorro	LINEAR	NYS	1.4 km	MPC · JPL
119256	2001 RW_{28}	—	September 7, 2001	Socorro	LINEAR	·	3.2 km	MPC · JPL
119257	2001 RN_{34}	—	September 8, 2001	Socorro	LINEAR	·	3.0 km	MPC · JPL
119258	2001 RK_{39}	—	September 10, 2001	Socorro	LINEAR	·	2.2 km	MPC · JPL
119259	2001 RC_{44}	—	September 9, 2001	Palomar	NEAT	V	1.2 km	MPC · JPL
119260	2001 RB_{45}	—	September 9, 2001	Palomar	NEAT	V	1.4 km	MPC · JPL
119261	2001 RG_{48}	—	September 11, 2001	Desert Eagle	W. K. Y. Yeung	·	5.0 km	MPC · JPL
119262	2001 RQ_{49}	—	September 10, 2001	Socorro	LINEAR	·	1.8 km	MPC · JPL
119263	2001 RG_{51}	—	September 11, 2001	Socorro	LINEAR	·	2.4 km	MPC · JPL
119264	2001 RZ_{55}	—	September 12, 2001	Socorro	LINEAR	NYS	1.6 km	MPC · JPL
119265	2001 RJ_{56}	—	September 12, 2001	Socorro	LINEAR	·	2.5 km	MPC · JPL
119266	2001 RA_{58}	—	September 12, 2001	Socorro	LINEAR	·	2.4 km	MPC · JPL
119267	2001 RZ_{65}	—	September 10, 2001	Socorro	LINEAR	·	2.8 km	MPC · JPL
119268	2001 RC_{67}	—	September 10, 2001	Socorro	LINEAR	·	2.5 km	MPC · JPL
119269	2001 RK_{68}	—	September 10, 2001	Socorro	LINEAR	V	1.3 km	MPC · JPL
119270	2001 RU_{72}	—	September 10, 2001	Socorro	LINEAR	·	2.6 km	MPC · JPL
119271	2001 RB_{76}	—	September 10, 2001	Socorro	LINEAR	·	1.9 km	MPC · JPL
119272	2001 RG_{77}	—	September 10, 2001	Socorro	LINEAR	·	2.8 km	MPC · JPL
119273	2001 RX_{78}	—	September 10, 2001	Socorro	LINEAR	·	4.7 km	MPC · JPL
119274	2001 RY_{79}	—	September 12, 2001	Socorro	LINEAR	PHO	2.4 km	MPC · JPL
119275	2001 RR_{81}	—	September 14, 2001	Palomar	NEAT	·	2.0 km	MPC · JPL
119276	2001 RS_{83}	—	September 11, 2001	Anderson Mesa	LONEOS	·	3.2 km	MPC · JPL
119277	2001 RZ_{88}	—	September 11, 2001	Anderson Mesa	LONEOS	NYS	2.4 km	MPC · JPL
119278	2001 RG_{91}	—	September 11, 2001	Anderson Mesa	LONEOS	NYS	2.0 km	MPC · JPL
119279	2001 RV_{91}	—	September 11, 2001	Anderson Mesa	LONEOS	·	1.6 km	MPC · JPL
119280	2001 RW_{92}	—	September 11, 2001	Anderson Mesa	LONEOS	·	2.0 km	MPC · JPL
119281	2001 RQ_{98}	—	September 9, 2001	Palomar	NEAT	·	1.8 km	MPC · JPL
119282	2001 RK_{100}	—	September 12, 2001	Socorro	LINEAR	·	1.8 km	MPC · JPL
119283	2001 RV_{100}	—	September 12, 2001	Socorro	LINEAR	·	2.7 km	MPC · JPL
119284	2001 RR_{101}	—	September 12, 2001	Socorro	LINEAR	·	1.1 km	MPC · JPL
119285	2001 RR_{107}	—	September 12, 2001	Socorro	LINEAR	·	2.1 km	MPC · JPL
119286	2001 RD_{109}	—	September 12, 2001	Socorro	LINEAR	NYS	1.9 km	MPC · JPL
119287	2001 RU_{110}	—	September 12, 2001	Socorro	LINEAR	·	2.1 km	MPC · JPL
119288	2001 RZ_{124}	—	September 12, 2001	Socorro	LINEAR	MAS	1.6 km	MPC · JPL
119289	2001 RW_{125}	—	September 12, 2001	Socorro	LINEAR	·	1.9 km	MPC · JPL
119290	2001 RA_{127}	—	September 12, 2001	Socorro	LINEAR	NYS	1.6 km	MPC · JPL
119291	2001 RK_{132}	—	September 12, 2001	Socorro	LINEAR	MAS	1.3 km	MPC · JPL
119292	2001 SR_{1}	—	September 17, 2001	Desert Eagle	W. K. Y. Yeung	·	2.1 km	MPC · JPL
119293	2001 SB_{2}	—	September 17, 2001	Desert Eagle	W. K. Y. Yeung	·	2.6 km	MPC · JPL
119294	2001 SV_{7}	—	September 18, 2001	Kitt Peak	Spacewatch	·	2.0 km	MPC · JPL
119295	2001 SV_{9}	—	September 18, 2001	Desert Eagle	W. K. Y. Yeung	·	2.6 km	MPC · JPL
119296	2001 SD_{10}	—	September 20, 2001	Desert Eagle	W. K. Y. Yeung	EUN	2.3 km	MPC · JPL
119297	2001 SH_{12}	—	September 16, 2001	Socorro	LINEAR	NYS	1.6 km	MPC · JPL
119298	2001 SY_{18}	—	September 16, 2001	Socorro	LINEAR	·	1.7 km	MPC · JPL
119299	2001 SX_{19}	—	September 16, 2001	Socorro	LINEAR	·	1.9 km	MPC · JPL
119300	2001 SO_{24}	—	September 16, 2001	Socorro	LINEAR	·	2.0 km	MPC · JPL

== 119301–119400 ==
back to top

Designation			Discovery			Properties		Ref
Permanent	Provisional	Named after	Date	Site	Discoverer(s)	Category	Diam.	Ref
119301	2001 SH_{25}	—	September 16, 2001	Socorro	LINEAR	·	3.1 km	MPC · JPL
119302	2001 SR_{26}	—	September 16, 2001	Socorro	LINEAR	NYS	3.8 km	MPC · JPL
119303	2001 SZ_{26}	—	September 16, 2001	Socorro	LINEAR	·	1.4 km	MPC · JPL
119304	2001 SQ_{33}	—	September 16, 2001	Socorro	LINEAR	·	3.0 km	MPC · JPL
119305	2001 SH_{42}	—	September 16, 2001	Socorro	LINEAR	MAS	1.3 km	MPC · JPL
119306	2001 SX_{47}	—	September 16, 2001	Socorro	LINEAR	·	2.4 km	MPC · JPL
119307	2001 SF_{48}	—	September 16, 2001	Socorro	LINEAR	NYS	3.3 km	MPC · JPL
119308	2001 SR_{51}	—	September 16, 2001	Socorro	LINEAR	·	2.2 km	MPC · JPL
119309	2001 SC_{52}	—	September 16, 2001	Socorro	LINEAR	·	2.7 km	MPC · JPL
119310	2001 SR_{62}	—	September 17, 2001	Socorro	LINEAR	·	2.4 km	MPC · JPL
119311	2001 SL_{66}	—	September 17, 2001	Socorro	LINEAR	·	1.5 km	MPC · JPL
119312	2001 SR_{70}	—	September 17, 2001	Socorro	LINEAR	·	3.7 km	MPC · JPL
119313	2001 SS_{72}	—	September 17, 2001	Socorro	LINEAR	(5)	1.8 km	MPC · JPL
119314	2001 SW_{72}	—	September 17, 2001	Socorro	LINEAR	·	2.7 km	MPC · JPL
119315	2001 SQ_{73}	—	September 19, 2001	Kitt Peak	Spacewatch	centaur	90 km	MPC · JPL
119316	2001 SR_{80}	—	September 20, 2001	Socorro	LINEAR	·	1.7 km	MPC · JPL
119317	2001 SG_{97}	—	September 20, 2001	Socorro	LINEAR	·	2.8 km	MPC · JPL
119318	2001 SL_{101}	—	September 20, 2001	Socorro	LINEAR	MAS	1.1 km	MPC · JPL
119319	2001 SZ_{104}	—	September 20, 2001	Socorro	LINEAR	·	1.7 km	MPC · JPL
119320	2001 SH_{109}	—	September 20, 2001	Socorro	LINEAR	·	3.4 km	MPC · JPL
119321	2001 SX_{114}	—	September 20, 2001	Desert Eagle	W. K. Y. Yeung	·	2.5 km	MPC · JPL
119322	2001 SA_{119}	—	September 16, 2001	Socorro	LINEAR	·	2.5 km	MPC · JPL
119323	2001 SQ_{121}	—	September 16, 2001	Socorro	LINEAR	GEF	3.1 km	MPC · JPL
119324	2001 SM_{124}	—	September 16, 2001	Socorro	LINEAR	·	2.4 km	MPC · JPL
119325	2001 SP_{125}	—	September 16, 2001	Socorro	LINEAR	·	1.3 km	MPC · JPL
119326	2001 SS_{128}	—	September 16, 2001	Socorro	LINEAR	V	1.2 km	MPC · JPL
119327	2001 SD_{130}	—	September 16, 2001	Socorro	LINEAR	NYS	1.6 km	MPC · JPL
119328	2001 SX_{131}	—	September 16, 2001	Socorro	LINEAR	NYS	2.5 km	MPC · JPL
119329	2001 SV_{135}	—	September 16, 2001	Socorro	LINEAR	MAS	1.4 km	MPC · JPL
119330	2001 SY_{135}	—	September 16, 2001	Socorro	LINEAR	·	2.4 km	MPC · JPL
119331	2001 SS_{136}	—	September 16, 2001	Socorro	LINEAR	·	1.6 km	MPC · JPL
119332	2001 SA_{140}	—	September 16, 2001	Socorro	LINEAR	·	2.0 km	MPC · JPL
119333	2001 SM_{141}	—	September 16, 2001	Socorro	LINEAR	·	1.6 km	MPC · JPL
119334	2001 SD_{143}	—	September 16, 2001	Socorro	LINEAR	·	2.0 km	MPC · JPL
119335	2001 SN_{144}	—	September 16, 2001	Socorro	LINEAR	·	2.8 km	MPC · JPL
119336	2001 SC_{145}	—	September 16, 2001	Socorro	LINEAR	·	2.0 km	MPC · JPL
119337	2001 SB_{146}	—	September 16, 2001	Socorro	LINEAR	NYS	2.3 km	MPC · JPL
119338	2001 SR_{152}	—	September 17, 2001	Socorro	LINEAR	PAD	3.1 km	MPC · JPL
119339	2001 SR_{154}	—	September 17, 2001	Socorro	LINEAR	·	3.1 km	MPC · JPL
119340	2001 SY_{161}	—	September 17, 2001	Socorro	LINEAR	·	1.8 km	MPC · JPL
119341	2001 SL_{168}	—	September 19, 2001	Socorro	LINEAR	·	3.6 km	MPC · JPL
119342	2001 SZ_{172}	—	September 16, 2001	Socorro	LINEAR	·	3.0 km	MPC · JPL
119343	2001 SR_{176}	—	September 16, 2001	Socorro	LINEAR	·	2.5 km	MPC · JPL
119344	2001 SK_{179}	—	September 17, 2001	Socorro	LINEAR	·	2.4 km	MPC · JPL
119345	2001 SB_{180}	—	September 19, 2001	Socorro	LINEAR	·	1.4 km	MPC · JPL
119346	2001 SS_{203}	—	September 19, 2001	Socorro	LINEAR	NYS	1.7 km	MPC · JPL
119347	2001 SM_{204}	—	September 19, 2001	Socorro	LINEAR	·	2.0 km	MPC · JPL
119348	2001 SQ_{209}	—	September 19, 2001	Socorro	LINEAR	·	1.7 km	MPC · JPL
119349	2001 SP_{212}	—	September 19, 2001	Socorro	LINEAR	NYS	2.2 km	MPC · JPL
119350	2001 SM_{220}	—	September 19, 2001	Socorro	LINEAR	·	2.6 km	MPC · JPL
119351	2001 SR_{222}	—	September 19, 2001	Socorro	LINEAR	NYS	1.4 km	MPC · JPL
119352	2001 ST_{226}	—	September 19, 2001	Socorro	LINEAR	V	940 m	MPC · JPL
119353	2001 SV_{231}	—	September 19, 2001	Socorro	LINEAR	NYS	1.8 km	MPC · JPL
119354	2001 SR_{232}	—	September 19, 2001	Socorro	LINEAR	·	1.9 km	MPC · JPL
119355	2001 SU_{232}	—	September 19, 2001	Socorro	LINEAR	AST	4.6 km	MPC · JPL
119356	2001 SF_{235}	—	September 19, 2001	Socorro	LINEAR	MAS	1.3 km	MPC · JPL
119357	2001 SM_{238}	—	September 19, 2001	Socorro	LINEAR	·	2.9 km	MPC · JPL
119358	2001 SW_{238}	—	September 19, 2001	Socorro	LINEAR	·	1.6 km	MPC · JPL
119359	2001 SN_{242}	—	September 19, 2001	Socorro	LINEAR	·	1.8 km	MPC · JPL
119360	2001 SL_{244}	—	September 19, 2001	Socorro	LINEAR	(5)	1.7 km	MPC · JPL
119361	2001 SK_{246}	—	September 19, 2001	Socorro	LINEAR	·	3.6 km	MPC · JPL
119362	2001 SQ_{246}	—	September 19, 2001	Socorro	LINEAR	·	2.6 km	MPC · JPL
119363	2001 SX_{246}	—	September 19, 2001	Socorro	LINEAR	·	1.9 km	MPC · JPL
119364	2001 SY_{246}	—	September 19, 2001	Socorro	LINEAR	NYS	2.6 km	MPC · JPL
119365	2001 SK_{250}	—	September 19, 2001	Socorro	LINEAR	V	1.4 km	MPC · JPL
119366	2001 SZ_{252}	—	September 19, 2001	Socorro	LINEAR	BRG	3.5 km	MPC · JPL
119367	2001 SO_{253}	—	September 19, 2001	Socorro	LINEAR	(5)	2.1 km	MPC · JPL
119368	2001 SD_{273}	—	September 26, 2001	Socorro	LINEAR	(14916)	4.9 km	MPC · JPL
119369	2001 SZ_{277}	—	September 21, 2001	Anderson Mesa	LONEOS	·	3.2 km	MPC · JPL
119370	2001 SL_{286}	—	September 21, 2001	Palomar	NEAT	·	2.2 km	MPC · JPL
119371	2001 SZ_{286}	—	September 22, 2001	Palomar	NEAT	·	1.8 km	MPC · JPL
119372	2001 SP_{292}	—	September 16, 2001	Socorro	LINEAR	·	2.4 km	MPC · JPL
119373	2001 SS_{308}	—	September 22, 2001	Socorro	LINEAR	EUN	2.3 km	MPC · JPL
119374	2001 SL_{311}	—	September 19, 2001	Socorro	LINEAR	·	2.5 km	MPC · JPL
119375	2001 SG_{315}	—	September 25, 2001	Socorro	LINEAR	EUN	2.2 km	MPC · JPL
119376	2001 SP_{316}	—	September 25, 2001	Socorro	LINEAR	·	4.1 km	MPC · JPL
119377	2001 SK_{318}	—	September 20, 2001	Socorro	LINEAR	·	2.1 km	MPC · JPL
119378	2001 SD_{321}	—	September 25, 2001	Socorro	LINEAR	·	2.5 km	MPC · JPL
119379	2001 SS_{323}	—	September 25, 2001	Socorro	LINEAR	·	4.2 km	MPC · JPL
119380	2001 SK_{325}	—	September 16, 2001	Socorro	LINEAR	·	2.3 km	MPC · JPL
119381	2001 SH_{326}	—	September 18, 2001	Anderson Mesa	LONEOS	·	2.2 km	MPC · JPL
119382	2001 SX_{346}	—	September 25, 2001	Socorro	LINEAR	·	2.9 km	MPC · JPL
119383	2001 SC_{349}	—	September 21, 2001	Socorro	LINEAR	·	2.4 km	MPC · JPL
119384	2001 TG	—	October 5, 2001	Palomar	NEAT	PHO	2.8 km	MPC · JPL
119385	2001 TU_{7}	—	October 11, 2001	Desert Eagle	W. K. Y. Yeung	·	3.5 km	MPC · JPL
119386	2001 TB_{11}	—	October 13, 2001	Socorro	LINEAR	·	2.5 km	MPC · JPL
119387	2001 TD_{12}	—	October 13, 2001	Socorro	LINEAR	·	1.8 km	MPC · JPL
119388	2001 TT_{12}	—	October 13, 2001	Socorro	LINEAR	·	2.7 km	MPC · JPL
119389	2001 TG_{20}	—	October 9, 2001	Socorro	LINEAR	·	7.0 km	MPC · JPL
119390	2001 TR_{27}	—	October 14, 2001	Socorro	LINEAR	·	3.4 km	MPC · JPL
119391	2001 TD_{32}	—	October 14, 2001	Socorro	LINEAR	·	2.0 km	MPC · JPL
119392	2001 TK_{33}	—	October 14, 2001	Socorro	LINEAR	·	4.0 km	MPC · JPL
119393	2001 TE_{34}	—	October 14, 2001	Socorro	LINEAR	V	1.4 km	MPC · JPL
119394	2001 TS_{38}	—	October 14, 2001	Socorro	LINEAR	EUN	2.1 km	MPC · JPL
119395	2001 TC_{40}	—	October 14, 2001	Socorro	LINEAR	·	5.5 km	MPC · JPL
119396	2001 TJ_{40}	—	October 14, 2001	Socorro	LINEAR	HNS	3.2 km	MPC · JPL
119397	2001 TQ_{43}	—	October 14, 2001	Socorro	LINEAR	JUN	3.5 km	MPC · JPL
119398	2001 TV_{46}	—	October 15, 2001	Desert Eagle	W. K. Y. Yeung	·	3.1 km	MPC · JPL
119399	2001 TH_{49}	—	October 15, 2001	Desert Eagle	W. K. Y. Yeung	V	1.3 km	MPC · JPL
119400	2001 TM_{50}	—	October 13, 2001	Socorro	LINEAR	·	3.7 km	MPC · JPL

== 119401–119500 ==
back to top

Designation			Discovery			Properties		Ref
Permanent	Provisional	Named after	Date	Site	Discoverer(s)	Category	Diam.	Ref
119401	2001 TY_{50}	—	October 13, 2001	Socorro	LINEAR	MAS	1.2 km	MPC · JPL
119402	2001 TY_{51}	—	October 13, 2001	Socorro	LINEAR	·	2.4 km	MPC · JPL
119403	2001 TU_{62}	—	October 13, 2001	Socorro	LINEAR	NYS	1.5 km	MPC · JPL
119404	2001 TK_{63}	—	October 13, 2001	Socorro	LINEAR	V	1.8 km	MPC · JPL
119405	2001 TU_{64}	—	October 13, 2001	Socorro	LINEAR	·	1.9 km	MPC · JPL
119406	2001 TY_{64}	—	October 13, 2001	Socorro	LINEAR	·	2.2 km	MPC · JPL
119407	2001 TG_{69}	—	October 13, 2001	Socorro	LINEAR	·	1.8 km	MPC · JPL
119408	2001 TS_{70}	—	October 13, 2001	Socorro	LINEAR	·	2.9 km	MPC · JPL
119409	2001 TH_{72}	—	October 13, 2001	Socorro	LINEAR	·	2.8 km	MPC · JPL
119410	2001 TU_{72}	—	October 13, 2001	Socorro	LINEAR	·	1.6 km	MPC · JPL
119411	2001 TJ_{73}	—	October 13, 2001	Socorro	LINEAR	·	1.8 km	MPC · JPL
119412	2001 TE_{76}	—	October 13, 2001	Socorro	LINEAR	·	5.4 km	MPC · JPL
119413	2001 TF_{78}	—	October 13, 2001	Socorro	LINEAR	(5)	2.1 km	MPC · JPL
119414	2001 TQ_{80}	—	October 13, 2001	Socorro	LINEAR	(5)	3.2 km	MPC · JPL
119415	2001 TC_{84}	—	October 14, 2001	Socorro	LINEAR	NEM	4.1 km	MPC · JPL
119416	2001 TD_{87}	—	October 14, 2001	Socorro	LINEAR	·	3.4 km	MPC · JPL
119417	2001 TH_{88}	—	October 14, 2001	Socorro	LINEAR	AGN	2.5 km	MPC · JPL
119418	2001 TX_{88}	—	October 14, 2001	Socorro	LINEAR	NYS ·	3.3 km	MPC · JPL
119419	2001 TO_{91}	—	October 14, 2001	Socorro	LINEAR	·	2.3 km	MPC · JPL
119420	2001 TL_{92}	—	October 14, 2001	Socorro	LINEAR	NEM	2.5 km	MPC · JPL
119421	2001 TG_{94}	—	October 14, 2001	Socorro	LINEAR	V	1.4 km	MPC · JPL
119422	2001 TS_{94}	—	October 14, 2001	Socorro	LINEAR	·	2.3 km	MPC · JPL
119423	2001 TH_{98}	—	October 14, 2001	Socorro	LINEAR	(5)	2.1 km	MPC · JPL
119424 Russelldurkee	2001 TG_{104}	Russelldurkee	October 15, 2001	Desert Eagle	W. K. Y. Yeung	·	3.2 km	MPC · JPL
119425	2001 TA_{107}	—	October 13, 2001	Socorro	LINEAR	·	3.4 km	MPC · JPL
119426	2001 TW_{107}	—	October 13, 2001	Socorro	LINEAR	PHO	3.4 km	MPC · JPL
119427	2001 TZ_{116}	—	October 14, 2001	Socorro	LINEAR	(5)	2.9 km	MPC · JPL
119428	2001 TP_{120}	—	October 15, 2001	Socorro	LINEAR	slow	2.7 km	MPC · JPL
119429	2001 TH_{123}	—	October 12, 2001	Haleakala	NEAT	·	3.1 km	MPC · JPL
119430	2001 TK_{124}	—	October 12, 2001	Haleakala	NEAT	·	1.8 km	MPC · JPL
119431	2001 TM_{128}	—	October 12, 2001	Haleakala	NEAT	·	3.5 km	MPC · JPL
119432	2001 TL_{131}	—	October 11, 2001	Palomar	NEAT	·	2.2 km	MPC · JPL
119433	2001 TT_{132}	—	October 12, 2001	Haleakala	NEAT	·	2.4 km	MPC · JPL
119434	2001 TL_{133}	—	October 12, 2001	Haleakala	NEAT	·	2.6 km	MPC · JPL
119435	2001 TP_{133}	—	October 12, 2001	Haleakala	NEAT	·	6.6 km	MPC · JPL
119436	2001 TL_{135}	—	October 13, 2001	Palomar	NEAT	·	4.1 km	MPC · JPL
119437	2001 TZ_{136}	—	October 14, 2001	Palomar	NEAT	·	2.1 km	MPC · JPL
119438	2001 TE_{138}	—	October 10, 2001	Palomar	NEAT	V	1.3 km	MPC · JPL
119439	2001 TJ_{138}	—	October 10, 2001	Palomar	NEAT	V	1.5 km	MPC · JPL
119440	2001 TN_{140}	—	October 10, 2001	Palomar	NEAT	·	1.9 km	MPC · JPL
119441	2001 TR_{141}	—	October 10, 2001	Palomar	NEAT	·	3.2 km	MPC · JPL
119442	2001 TC_{147}	—	October 10, 2001	Palomar	NEAT	V	1.5 km	MPC · JPL
119443	2001 TF_{147}	—	October 10, 2001	Palomar	NEAT	EUN	2.0 km	MPC · JPL
119444	2001 TY_{148}	—	October 10, 2001	Palomar	NEAT	·	3.0 km	MPC · JPL
119445	2001 TM_{154}	—	October 15, 2001	Palomar	NEAT	·	2.6 km	MPC · JPL
119446	2001 TT_{154}	—	October 15, 2001	Palomar	NEAT	·	2.1 km	MPC · JPL
119447	2001 TC_{164}	—	October 11, 2001	Palomar	NEAT	·	2.0 km	MPC · JPL
119448	2001 TX_{169}	—	October 15, 2001	Socorro	LINEAR	·	2.9 km	MPC · JPL
119449	2001 TX_{170}	—	October 15, 2001	Palomar	NEAT	JUN	2.4 km	MPC · JPL
119450	2001 TO_{174}	—	October 15, 2001	Socorro	LINEAR	·	2.7 km	MPC · JPL
119451	2001 TJ_{175}	—	October 14, 2001	Socorro	LINEAR	·	2.3 km	MPC · JPL
119452	2001 TQ_{185}	—	October 14, 2001	Socorro	LINEAR	·	2.9 km	MPC · JPL
119453	2001 TF_{186}	—	October 14, 2001	Socorro	LINEAR	·	2.9 km	MPC · JPL
119454	2001 TS_{189}	—	October 14, 2001	Socorro	LINEAR	·	2.7 km	MPC · JPL
119455	2001 TV_{189}	—	October 14, 2001	Socorro	LINEAR	·	1.7 km	MPC · JPL
119456	2001 TQ_{191}	—	October 14, 2001	Socorro	LINEAR	·	3.2 km	MPC · JPL
119457	2001 TS_{191}	—	October 14, 2001	Socorro	LINEAR	·	2.7 km	MPC · JPL
119458	2001 TJ_{192}	—	October 14, 2001	Socorro	LINEAR	·	2.4 km	MPC · JPL
119459	2001 TV_{192}	—	October 14, 2001	Socorro	LINEAR	HNS	2.9 km	MPC · JPL
119460	2001 TQ_{194}	—	October 15, 2001	Socorro	LINEAR	(5)	1.9 km	MPC · JPL
119461	2001 TA_{202}	—	October 11, 2001	Socorro	LINEAR	·	1.5 km	MPC · JPL
119462	2001 TE_{203}	—	October 11, 2001	Socorro	LINEAR	·	2.8 km	MPC · JPL
119463	2001 TL_{208}	—	October 11, 2001	Kitt Peak	Spacewatch	·	2.2 km	MPC · JPL
119464	2001 TX_{226}	—	October 14, 2001	Haleakala	NEAT	·	2.1 km	MPC · JPL
119465	2001 TG_{233}	—	October 15, 2001	Palomar	NEAT	EUN	2.6 km	MPC · JPL
119466	2001 UK_{5}	—	October 18, 2001	Desert Eagle	W. K. Y. Yeung	·	2.3 km	MPC · JPL
119467	2001 UB_{7}	—	October 18, 2001	Desert Eagle	W. K. Y. Yeung	(5)	2.2 km	MPC · JPL
119468	2001 UH_{8}	—	October 17, 2001	Socorro	LINEAR	·	3.4 km	MPC · JPL
119469	2001 UE_{11}	—	October 22, 2001	Desert Eagle	W. K. Y. Yeung	·	3.2 km	MPC · JPL
119470	2001 UN_{13}	—	October 24, 2001	Desert Eagle	W. K. Y. Yeung	·	3.7 km	MPC · JPL
119471	2001 UZ_{13}	—	October 24, 2001	Desert Eagle	W. K. Y. Yeung	·	3.6 km	MPC · JPL
119472	2001 UM_{16}	—	October 25, 2001	Farpoint	G. Hug	·	2.5 km	MPC · JPL
119473	2001 UO_{18}	—	October 19, 2001	Kitt Peak	M. W. Buie	plutino	115 km	MPC · JPL
119474	2001 UW_{19}	—	October 16, 2001	Palomar	NEAT	V	1.1 km	MPC · JPL
119475	2001 UF_{28}	—	October 16, 2001	Socorro	LINEAR	·	2.7 km	MPC · JPL
119476	2001 UG_{28}	—	October 16, 2001	Socorro	LINEAR	·	2.6 km	MPC · JPL
119477	2001 UH_{30}	—	October 16, 2001	Socorro	LINEAR	·	2.4 km	MPC · JPL
119478	2001 US_{32}	—	October 16, 2001	Socorro	LINEAR	NYS	2.8 km	MPC · JPL
119479	2001 UT_{33}	—	October 16, 2001	Socorro	LINEAR	·	2.1 km	MPC · JPL
119480	2001 UE_{34}	—	October 16, 2001	Socorro	LINEAR	·	1.7 km	MPC · JPL
119481	2001 UK_{34}	—	October 16, 2001	Socorro	LINEAR	·	2.0 km	MPC · JPL
119482	2001 UJ_{38}	—	October 17, 2001	Socorro	LINEAR	·	1.6 km	MPC · JPL
119483	2001 UH_{47}	—	October 17, 2001	Socorro	LINEAR	·	2.8 km	MPC · JPL
119484	2001 UT_{50}	—	October 17, 2001	Socorro	LINEAR	EUN	2.7 km	MPC · JPL
119485	2001 UU_{53}	—	October 17, 2001	Socorro	LINEAR	·	2.7 km	MPC · JPL
119486	2001 UD_{55}	—	October 16, 2001	Socorro	LINEAR	·	2.4 km	MPC · JPL
119487	2001 UT_{59}	—	October 17, 2001	Socorro	LINEAR	·	2.1 km	MPC · JPL
119488	2001 UK_{63}	—	October 17, 2001	Socorro	LINEAR	(5)	2.5 km	MPC · JPL
119489	2001 UM_{64}	—	October 18, 2001	Socorro	LINEAR	KON	4.9 km	MPC · JPL
119490	2001 UA_{68}	—	October 20, 2001	Socorro	LINEAR	MAS	1.4 km	MPC · JPL
119491	2001 UM_{72}	—	October 20, 2001	Haleakala	NEAT	EUN	2.7 km	MPC · JPL
119492	2001 UF_{78}	—	October 20, 2001	Socorro	LINEAR	·	2.1 km	MPC · JPL
119493	2001 UA_{79}	—	October 20, 2001	Socorro	LINEAR	·	2.5 km	MPC · JPL
119494	2001 UK_{80}	—	October 20, 2001	Socorro	LINEAR	·	1.9 km	MPC · JPL
119495	2001 UW_{80}	—	October 20, 2001	Socorro	LINEAR	·	2.0 km	MPC · JPL
119496	2001 UW_{93}	—	October 19, 2001	Haleakala	NEAT	·	2.7 km	MPC · JPL
119497	2001 UR_{105}	—	October 20, 2001	Socorro	LINEAR	·	2.9 km	MPC · JPL
119498	2001 UU_{109}	—	October 20, 2001	Socorro	LINEAR	·	3.8 km	MPC · JPL
119499	2001 UV_{113}	—	October 22, 2001	Socorro	LINEAR	·	2.2 km	MPC · JPL
119500	2001 UO_{116}	—	October 22, 2001	Socorro	LINEAR	·	3.0 km	MPC · JPL

== 119501–119600 ==
back to top

Designation			Discovery			Properties		Ref
Permanent	Provisional	Named after	Date	Site	Discoverer(s)	Category	Diam.	Ref
119501	2001 UL_{119}	—	October 22, 2001	Socorro	LINEAR	·	3.0 km	MPC · JPL
119502	2001 UH_{120}	—	October 22, 2001	Socorro	LINEAR	·	2.4 km	MPC · JPL
119503	2001 UR_{124}	—	October 22, 2001	Palomar	NEAT	·	4.5 km	MPC · JPL
119504	2001 UQ_{126}	—	October 17, 2001	Socorro	LINEAR	·	2.1 km	MPC · JPL
119505	2001 UR_{127}	—	October 17, 2001	Socorro	LINEAR	·	2.7 km	MPC · JPL
119506	2001 UQ_{128}	—	October 20, 2001	Socorro	LINEAR	·	2.2 km	MPC · JPL
119507	2001 UP_{131}	—	October 20, 2001	Socorro	LINEAR	·	2.7 km	MPC · JPL
119508	2001 UD_{132}	—	October 20, 2001	Socorro	LINEAR	EUN	2.1 km	MPC · JPL
119509	2001 UH_{133}	—	October 21, 2001	Socorro	LINEAR	NYS ·	4.3 km	MPC · JPL
119510	2001 UW_{134}	—	October 21, 2001	Socorro	LINEAR	·	2.8 km	MPC · JPL
119511	2001 UX_{134}	—	October 21, 2001	Socorro	LINEAR	·	2.7 km	MPC · JPL
119512	2001 UC_{136}	—	October 22, 2001	Socorro	LINEAR	slow	2.2 km	MPC · JPL
119513	2001 UU_{138}	—	October 23, 2001	Socorro	LINEAR	MAS · fast	1.4 km	MPC · JPL
119514	2001 UT_{141}	—	October 23, 2001	Socorro	LINEAR	·	2.1 km	MPC · JPL
119515	2001 UL_{149}	—	October 23, 2001	Socorro	LINEAR	·	2.7 km	MPC · JPL
119516	2001 UP_{150}	—	October 23, 2001	Socorro	LINEAR	·	2.7 km	MPC · JPL
119517	2001 US_{150}	—	October 23, 2001	Socorro	LINEAR	·	1.9 km	MPC · JPL
119518	2001 UJ_{154}	—	October 23, 2001	Socorro	LINEAR	·	3.8 km	MPC · JPL
119519	2001 UJ_{157}	—	October 23, 2001	Socorro	LINEAR	·	2.3 km	MPC · JPL
119520	2001 UB_{159}	—	October 23, 2001	Socorro	LINEAR	·	2.1 km	MPC · JPL
119521	2001 UU_{161}	—	October 23, 2001	Socorro	LINEAR	·	3.3 km	MPC · JPL
119522	2001 UX_{162}	—	October 23, 2001	Socorro	LINEAR	·	2.1 km	MPC · JPL
119523	2001 UU_{164}	—	October 23, 2001	Palomar	NEAT	·	2.2 km	MPC · JPL
119524	2001 UW_{167}	—	October 19, 2001	Socorro	LINEAR	·	4.0 km	MPC · JPL
119525	2001 UC_{169}	—	October 19, 2001	Socorro	LINEAR	EUN	6.6 km	MPC · JPL
119526	2001 UF_{175}	—	October 24, 2001	Palomar	NEAT	·	4.8 km	MPC · JPL
119527	2001 UH_{177}	—	October 21, 2001	Socorro	LINEAR	·	2.4 km	MPC · JPL
119528	2001 US_{179}	—	October 26, 2001	Haleakala	NEAT	L5	22 km	MPC · JPL
119529	2001 UY_{187}	—	October 17, 2001	Socorro	LINEAR	·	2.1 km	MPC · JPL
119530	2001 VE_{1}	—	November 6, 2001	Socorro	LINEAR	PHO	2.2 km	MPC · JPL
119531	2001 VX_{1}	—	November 8, 2001	Bisei SG Center	BATTeRS	(5)	5.5 km	MPC · JPL
119532	2001 VD_{9}	—	November 9, 2001	Socorro	LINEAR	·	3.4 km	MPC · JPL
119533	2001 VV_{9}	—	November 9, 2001	Socorro	LINEAR	·	2.5 km	MPC · JPL
119534	2001 VL_{10}	—	November 10, 2001	Socorro	LINEAR	·	4.2 km	MPC · JPL
119535	2001 VR_{11}	—	November 10, 2001	Socorro	LINEAR	·	2.6 km	MPC · JPL
119536	2001 VP_{12}	—	November 10, 2001	Socorro	LINEAR	·	3.5 km	MPC · JPL
119537	2001 VF_{14}	—	November 10, 2001	Socorro	LINEAR	·	3.0 km	MPC · JPL
119538	2001 VD_{15}	—	November 10, 2001	Socorro	LINEAR	EUN	2.9 km	MPC · JPL
119539	2001 VL_{15}	—	November 10, 2001	Socorro	LINEAR	·	4.0 km	MPC · JPL
119540	2001 VJ_{18}	—	November 9, 2001	Socorro	LINEAR	(5)	2.2 km	MPC · JPL
119541	2001 VP_{20}	—	November 9, 2001	Socorro	LINEAR	·	1.7 km	MPC · JPL
119542	2001 VB_{26}	—	November 9, 2001	Socorro	LINEAR	·	1.6 km	MPC · JPL
119543	2001 VE_{26}	—	November 9, 2001	Socorro	LINEAR	MAR	2.0 km	MPC · JPL
119544	2001 VR_{26}	—	November 9, 2001	Socorro	LINEAR	·	5.5 km	MPC · JPL
119545	2001 VY_{26}	—	November 9, 2001	Socorro	LINEAR	·	2.6 km	MPC · JPL
119546	2001 VC_{29}	—	November 9, 2001	Socorro	LINEAR	·	3.9 km	MPC · JPL
119547	2001 VG_{29}	—	November 9, 2001	Socorro	LINEAR	MAR	2.6 km	MPC · JPL
119548	2001 VZ_{29}	—	November 9, 2001	Socorro	LINEAR	·	3.2 km	MPC · JPL
119549	2001 VO_{33}	—	November 9, 2001	Socorro	LINEAR	NYS	2.8 km	MPC · JPL
119550	2001 VG_{34}	—	November 9, 2001	Socorro	LINEAR	·	3.7 km	MPC · JPL
119551	2001 VX_{34}	—	November 9, 2001	Socorro	LINEAR	EUN	4.0 km	MPC · JPL
119552	2001 VN_{35}	—	November 9, 2001	Socorro	LINEAR	(5)	2.3 km	MPC · JPL
119553	2001 VH_{36}	—	November 9, 2001	Socorro	LINEAR	slow	3.3 km	MPC · JPL
119554	2001 VQ_{36}	—	November 9, 2001	Socorro	LINEAR	·	4.1 km	MPC · JPL
119555	2001 VW_{39}	—	November 9, 2001	Socorro	LINEAR	·	3.7 km	MPC · JPL
119556	2001 VS_{41}	—	November 9, 2001	Socorro	LINEAR	MAR	2.1 km	MPC · JPL
119557	2001 VV_{41}	—	November 9, 2001	Socorro	LINEAR	·	2.5 km	MPC · JPL
119558	2001 VS_{42}	—	November 9, 2001	Socorro	LINEAR	·	2.1 km	MPC · JPL
119559	2001 VE_{45}	—	November 9, 2001	Socorro	LINEAR	ADE	4.9 km	MPC · JPL
119560	2001 VM_{46}	—	November 9, 2001	Socorro	LINEAR	·	4.4 km	MPC · JPL
119561	2001 VO_{48}	—	November 9, 2001	Socorro	LINEAR	·	2.3 km	MPC · JPL
119562	2001 VC_{66}	—	November 10, 2001	Socorro	LINEAR	·	3.0 km	MPC · JPL
119563	2001 VX_{68}	—	November 11, 2001	Socorro	LINEAR	NYS	1.7 km	MPC · JPL
119564	2001 VR_{69}	—	November 11, 2001	Socorro	LINEAR	·	2.4 km	MPC · JPL
119565	2001 VL_{72}	—	November 12, 2001	Kitt Peak	Spacewatch	·	1.7 km	MPC · JPL
119566	2001 VN_{72}	—	November 12, 2001	Kitt Peak	Spacewatch	·	2.7 km	MPC · JPL
119567	2001 VV_{79}	—	November 9, 2001	Palomar	NEAT	·	6.4 km	MPC · JPL
119568	2001 VP_{81}	—	November 15, 2001	Palomar	NEAT	ADE	4.0 km	MPC · JPL
119569	2001 VD_{82}	—	November 10, 2001	Bergisch Gladbach	W. Bickel	EUN	2.7 km	MPC · JPL
119570	2001 VC_{84}	—	November 11, 2001	Socorro	LINEAR	·	2.4 km	MPC · JPL
119571	2001 VJ_{88}	—	November 12, 2001	Haleakala	NEAT	·	2.1 km	MPC · JPL
119572	2001 VM_{88}	—	November 15, 2001	Palomar	NEAT	·	1.5 km	MPC · JPL
119573	2001 VP_{90}	—	November 15, 2001	Socorro	LINEAR	·	3.9 km	MPC · JPL
119574	2001 VT_{90}	—	November 15, 2001	Socorro	LINEAR	·	2.5 km	MPC · JPL
119575	2001 VK_{91}	—	November 15, 2001	Socorro	LINEAR	·	3.4 km	MPC · JPL
119576	2001 VF_{93}	—	November 15, 2001	Socorro	LINEAR	EUN	2.8 km	MPC · JPL
119577	2001 VB_{96}	—	November 15, 2001	Socorro	LINEAR	·	3.9 km	MPC · JPL
119578	2001 VX_{96}	—	November 15, 2001	Socorro	LINEAR	·	4.4 km	MPC · JPL
119579	2001 VU_{97}	—	November 15, 2001	Socorro	LINEAR	·	2.4 km	MPC · JPL
119580	2001 VD_{101}	—	November 12, 2001	Socorro	LINEAR	·	3.5 km	MPC · JPL
119581	2001 VK_{103}	—	November 12, 2001	Socorro	LINEAR	·	2.7 km	MPC · JPL
119582	2001 VL_{103}	—	November 12, 2001	Socorro	LINEAR	·	3.2 km	MPC · JPL
119583	2001 VM_{103}	—	November 12, 2001	Socorro	LINEAR	·	2.4 km	MPC · JPL
119584	2001 VS_{108}	—	November 12, 2001	Socorro	LINEAR	·	2.6 km	MPC · JPL
119585	2001 VX_{108}	—	November 12, 2001	Socorro	LINEAR	·	2.0 km	MPC · JPL
119586	2001 VZ_{108}	—	November 12, 2001	Socorro	LINEAR	·	3.0 km	MPC · JPL
119587	2001 VA_{110}	—	November 12, 2001	Socorro	LINEAR	·	2.3 km	MPC · JPL
119588	2001 VV_{110}	—	November 12, 2001	Socorro	LINEAR	·	3.0 km	MPC · JPL
119589	2001 VK_{113}	—	November 12, 2001	Socorro	LINEAR	RAF	2.1 km	MPC · JPL
119590	2001 VS_{117}	—	November 12, 2001	Socorro	LINEAR	·	4.1 km	MPC · JPL
119591	2001 VD_{118}	—	November 12, 2001	Socorro	LINEAR	MAS	1.7 km	MPC · JPL
119592	2001 VJ_{125}	—	November 15, 2001	Socorro	LINEAR	·	3.8 km	MPC · JPL
119593	2001 VA_{126}	—	November 14, 2001	Kitt Peak	Spacewatch	·	2.7 km	MPC · JPL
119594	2001 WC_{8}	—	November 17, 2001	Socorro	LINEAR	·	2.6 km	MPC · JPL
119595	2001 WY_{8}	—	November 17, 2001	Socorro	LINEAR	·	2.3 km	MPC · JPL
119596	2001 WT_{9}	—	November 17, 2001	Socorro	LINEAR	·	2.4 km	MPC · JPL
119597	2001 WS_{11}	—	November 17, 2001	Socorro	LINEAR	·	3.5 km	MPC · JPL
119598	2001 WT_{11}	—	November 17, 2001	Socorro	LINEAR	·	3.0 km	MPC · JPL
119599	2001 WB_{12}	—	November 17, 2001	Socorro	LINEAR	·	2.7 km	MPC · JPL
119600	2001 WM_{12}	—	November 17, 2001	Socorro	LINEAR	·	3.0 km	MPC · JPL

== 119601–119700 ==
back to top

Designation			Discovery			Properties		Ref
Permanent	Provisional	Named after	Date	Site	Discoverer(s)	Category	Diam.	Ref
119601	2001 WA_{14}	—	November 17, 2001	Socorro	LINEAR	·	2.6 km	MPC · JPL
119602 Italodimaria	2001 WD_{15}	Italodimaria	November 24, 2001	Farra d'Isonzo	Farra d'Isonzo	·	2.9 km	MPC · JPL
119603	2001 WW_{16}	—	November 17, 2001	Socorro	LINEAR	·	2.4 km	MPC · JPL
119604	2001 WT_{18}	—	November 17, 2001	Socorro	LINEAR	·	2.3 km	MPC · JPL
119605	2001 WY_{18}	—	November 17, 2001	Socorro	LINEAR	·	2.6 km	MPC · JPL
119606	2001 WM_{19}	—	November 17, 2001	Socorro	LINEAR	·	2.1 km	MPC · JPL
119607	2001 WT_{20}	—	November 17, 2001	Socorro	LINEAR	·	3.5 km	MPC · JPL
119608	2001 WC_{23}	—	November 27, 2001	Socorro	LINEAR	PHO	2.5 km	MPC · JPL
119609	2001 WN_{26}	—	November 17, 2001	Socorro	LINEAR	HNS	2.1 km	MPC · JPL
119610	2001 WV_{26}	—	November 17, 2001	Socorro	LINEAR	·	3.6 km	MPC · JPL
119611	2001 WY_{26}	—	November 17, 2001	Socorro	LINEAR	·	2.7 km	MPC · JPL
119612	2001 WY_{27}	—	November 17, 2001	Socorro	LINEAR	·	2.2 km	MPC · JPL
119613	2001 WT_{32}	—	November 17, 2001	Socorro	LINEAR	·	3.1 km	MPC · JPL
119614	2001 WM_{35}	—	November 17, 2001	Socorro	LINEAR	·	2.0 km	MPC · JPL
119615	2001 WO_{35}	—	November 17, 2001	Socorro	LINEAR	·	1.9 km	MPC · JPL
119616	2001 WH_{36}	—	November 17, 2001	Socorro	LINEAR	·	3.8 km	MPC · JPL
119617	2001 WL_{38}	—	November 17, 2001	Socorro	LINEAR	GAL	3.6 km	MPC · JPL
119618	2001 WL_{39}	—	November 17, 2001	Socorro	LINEAR	·	2.9 km	MPC · JPL
119619	2001 WP_{39}	—	November 17, 2001	Socorro	LINEAR	·	2.3 km	MPC · JPL
119620	2001 WY_{42}	—	November 18, 2001	Socorro	LINEAR	·	2.8 km	MPC · JPL
119621	2001 WQ_{43}	—	November 18, 2001	Socorro	LINEAR	·	1.6 km	MPC · JPL
119622	2001 WY_{48}	—	November 17, 2001	Kitt Peak	Spacewatch	·	2.9 km	MPC · JPL
119623	2001 WK_{53}	—	November 19, 2001	Socorro	LINEAR	·	2.6 km	MPC · JPL
119624	2001 WM_{73}	—	November 20, 2001	Socorro	LINEAR	·	2.3 km	MPC · JPL
119625	2001 WZ_{81}	—	November 20, 2001	Socorro	LINEAR	·	3.1 km	MPC · JPL
119626	2001 WD_{91}	—	November 21, 2001	Socorro	LINEAR	·	5.3 km	MPC · JPL
119627	2001 WJ_{99}	—	November 17, 2001	Socorro	LINEAR	·	4.2 km	MPC · JPL
119628	2001 WQ_{100}	—	November 16, 2001	Kitt Peak	Spacewatch	·	2.8 km	MPC · JPL
119629	2001 WP_{101}	—	November 17, 2001	Kitt Peak	Spacewatch	THM	4.0 km	MPC · JPL
119630	2001 XJ_{5}	—	December 5, 2001	Haleakala	NEAT	·	2.6 km	MPC · JPL
119631	2001 XC_{7}	—	December 7, 2001	Socorro	LINEAR	·	4.5 km	MPC · JPL
119632	2001 XE_{11}	—	December 8, 2001	Socorro	LINEAR	·	3.6 km	MPC · JPL
119633	2001 XR_{13}	—	December 9, 2001	Socorro	LINEAR	·	3.9 km	MPC · JPL
119634	2001 XM_{16}	—	December 13, 2001	Oaxaca	Roe, J. M.	·	3.7 km	MPC · JPL
119635	2001 XB_{17}	—	December 9, 2001	Socorro	LINEAR	·	4.7 km	MPC · JPL
119636	2001 XB_{18}	—	December 9, 2001	Socorro	LINEAR	·	2.5 km	MPC · JPL
119637	2001 XC_{19}	—	December 9, 2001	Socorro	LINEAR	slow	5.0 km	MPC · JPL
119638	2001 XG_{24}	—	December 10, 2001	Socorro	LINEAR	V	1.7 km	MPC · JPL
119639	2001 XV_{24}	—	December 10, 2001	Socorro	LINEAR	·	5.4 km	MPC · JPL
119640	2001 XM_{25}	—	December 10, 2001	Socorro	LINEAR	·	4.7 km	MPC · JPL
119641	2001 XP_{25}	—	December 10, 2001	Socorro	LINEAR	(5)	1.9 km	MPC · JPL
119642	2001 XX_{28}	—	December 11, 2001	Socorro	LINEAR	(5)	2.8 km	MPC · JPL
119643	2001 XN_{30}	—	December 11, 2001	Socorro	LINEAR	·	1.9 km	MPC · JPL
119644	2001 XM_{36}	—	December 9, 2001	Socorro	LINEAR	·	3.0 km	MPC · JPL
119645	2001 XF_{40}	—	December 9, 2001	Socorro	LINEAR	HNS	2.1 km	MPC · JPL
119646	2001 XN_{40}	—	December 9, 2001	Socorro	LINEAR	EUN	3.0 km	MPC · JPL
119647	2001 XS_{40}	—	December 9, 2001	Socorro	LINEAR	·	3.7 km	MPC · JPL
119648	2001 XV_{41}	—	December 9, 2001	Socorro	LINEAR	EUN	3.1 km	MPC · JPL
119649	2001 XU_{45}	—	December 9, 2001	Socorro	LINEAR	·	9.1 km	MPC · JPL
119650	2001 XT_{48}	—	December 14, 2001	Socorro	LINEAR	·	3.8 km	MPC · JPL
119651	2001 XE_{49}	—	December 10, 2001	Socorro	LINEAR	·	4.3 km	MPC · JPL
119652	2001 XV_{49}	—	December 10, 2001	Socorro	LINEAR	·	1.8 km	MPC · JPL
119653	2001 XK_{54}	—	December 10, 2001	Socorro	LINEAR	MAS	1.1 km	MPC · JPL
119654	2001 XO_{54}	—	December 10, 2001	Socorro	LINEAR	·	2.4 km	MPC · JPL
119655	2001 XV_{55}	—	December 10, 2001	Socorro	LINEAR	·	2.4 km	MPC · JPL
119656	2001 XJ_{58}	—	December 10, 2001	Socorro	LINEAR	·	1.9 km	MPC · JPL
119657	2001 XQ_{58}	—	December 10, 2001	Socorro	LINEAR	·	3.5 km	MPC · JPL
119658	2001 XX_{58}	—	December 10, 2001	Socorro	LINEAR	·	3.3 km	MPC · JPL
119659	2001 XE_{62}	—	December 10, 2001	Socorro	LINEAR	·	4.5 km	MPC · JPL
119660	2001 XL_{62}	—	December 10, 2001	Socorro	LINEAR	·	2.6 km	MPC · JPL
119661	2001 XN_{62}	—	December 11, 2001	Socorro	LINEAR	·	4.7 km	MPC · JPL
119662	2001 XN_{63}	—	December 10, 2001	Socorro	LINEAR	MRX	2.2 km	MPC · JPL
119663	2001 XP_{65}	—	December 10, 2001	Socorro	LINEAR	·	3.9 km	MPC · JPL
119664	2001 XN_{67}	—	December 10, 2001	Socorro	LINEAR	EUN	2.1 km	MPC · JPL
119665	2001 XR_{67}	—	December 10, 2001	Socorro	LINEAR	EUN	2.9 km	MPC · JPL
119666	2001 XQ_{73}	—	December 11, 2001	Socorro	LINEAR	·	2.7 km	MPC · JPL
119667	2001 XY_{73}	—	December 11, 2001	Socorro	LINEAR	HNS ·	2.0 km	MPC · JPL
119668	2001 XB_{74}	—	December 11, 2001	Socorro	LINEAR	MAS	1.1 km	MPC · JPL
119669	2001 XR_{74}	—	December 11, 2001	Socorro	LINEAR	NYS	2.1 km	MPC · JPL
119670	2001 XO_{75}	—	December 11, 2001	Socorro	LINEAR	·	2.9 km	MPC · JPL
119671	2001 XO_{77}	—	December 11, 2001	Socorro	LINEAR	·	2.7 km	MPC · JPL
119672	2001 XC_{86}	—	December 11, 2001	Socorro	LINEAR	·	3.5 km	MPC · JPL
119673	2001 XN_{87}	—	December 13, 2001	Socorro	LINEAR	EUN	3.3 km	MPC · JPL
119674	2001 XY_{90}	—	December 10, 2001	Socorro	LINEAR	·	2.1 km	MPC · JPL
119675	2001 XX_{91}	—	December 10, 2001	Socorro	LINEAR	·	2.3 km	MPC · JPL
119676	2001 XG_{95}	—	December 10, 2001	Socorro	LINEAR	·	3.4 km	MPC · JPL
119677	2001 XW_{96}	—	December 10, 2001	Socorro	LINEAR	·	2.6 km	MPC · JPL
119678	2001 XX_{105}	—	December 10, 2001	Socorro	LINEAR	·	2.4 km	MPC · JPL
119679	2001 XV_{107}	—	December 10, 2001	Socorro	LINEAR	·	4.4 km	MPC · JPL
119680	2001 XX_{107}	—	December 10, 2001	Socorro	LINEAR	·	3.6 km	MPC · JPL
119681	2001 XY_{107}	—	December 10, 2001	Socorro	LINEAR	·	3.9 km	MPC · JPL
119682	2001 XE_{108}	—	December 10, 2001	Socorro	LINEAR	NEM	5.2 km	MPC · JPL
119683	2001 XB_{110}	—	December 11, 2001	Socorro	LINEAR	·	3.7 km	MPC · JPL
119684	2001 XC_{113}	—	December 11, 2001	Socorro	LINEAR	GEF	2.0 km	MPC · JPL
119685	2001 XS_{114}	—	December 13, 2001	Socorro	LINEAR	·	3.7 km	MPC · JPL
119686	2001 XY_{116}	—	December 13, 2001	Socorro	LINEAR	·	4.1 km	MPC · JPL
119687	2001 XQ_{121}	—	December 14, 2001	Socorro	LINEAR	·	2.9 km	MPC · JPL
119688	2001 XK_{126}	—	December 14, 2001	Socorro	LINEAR	·	1.8 km	MPC · JPL
119689	2001 XJ_{129}	—	December 14, 2001	Socorro	LINEAR	·	4.3 km	MPC · JPL
119690	2001 XP_{130}	—	December 14, 2001	Socorro	LINEAR	·	2.9 km	MPC · JPL
119691	2001 XK_{132}	—	December 14, 2001	Socorro	LINEAR	·	2.6 km	MPC · JPL
119692	2001 XN_{140}	—	December 14, 2001	Socorro	LINEAR	·	3.4 km	MPC · JPL
119693	2001 XD_{145}	—	December 14, 2001	Socorro	LINEAR	·	3.1 km	MPC · JPL
119694	2001 XE_{146}	—	December 14, 2001	Socorro	LINEAR	·	3.8 km	MPC · JPL
119695	2001 XP_{148}	—	December 14, 2001	Socorro	LINEAR	·	2.9 km	MPC · JPL
119696	2001 XC_{152}	—	December 14, 2001	Socorro	LINEAR	MAS	1.4 km	MPC · JPL
119697	2001 XT_{152}	—	December 14, 2001	Socorro	LINEAR	NYS ·	3.2 km	MPC · JPL
119698	2001 XA_{155}	—	December 14, 2001	Socorro	LINEAR	·	5.5 km	MPC · JPL
119699	2001 XV_{155}	—	December 14, 2001	Socorro	LINEAR	(5)	3.1 km	MPC · JPL
119700	2001 XE_{156}	—	December 14, 2001	Socorro	LINEAR	AGN	2.1 km	MPC · JPL

== 119701–119800 ==
back to top

Designation			Discovery			Properties		Ref
Permanent	Provisional	Named after	Date	Site	Discoverer(s)	Category	Diam.	Ref
119701	2001 XW_{156}	—	December 14, 2001	Socorro	LINEAR	·	2.2 km	MPC · JPL
119702	2001 XM_{157}	—	December 14, 2001	Socorro	LINEAR	AGN	2.4 km	MPC · JPL
119703	2001 XG_{158}	—	December 14, 2001	Socorro	LINEAR	·	2.9 km	MPC · JPL
119704	2001 XW_{164}	—	December 14, 2001	Socorro	LINEAR	·	3.0 km	MPC · JPL
119705	2001 XP_{169}	—	December 14, 2001	Socorro	LINEAR	MAS	1.4 km	MPC · JPL
119706	2001 XW_{183}	—	December 14, 2001	Socorro	LINEAR	JUN	1.9 km	MPC · JPL
119707	2001 XA_{185}	—	December 14, 2001	Socorro	LINEAR	fast	2.7 km	MPC · JPL
119708	2001 XN_{185}	—	December 14, 2001	Socorro	LINEAR	·	3.9 km	MPC · JPL
119709	2001 XR_{186}	—	December 14, 2001	Socorro	LINEAR	KOR	2.7 km	MPC · JPL
119710	2001 XP_{191}	—	December 14, 2001	Socorro	LINEAR	·	2.0 km	MPC · JPL
119711	2001 XP_{193}	—	December 14, 2001	Socorro	LINEAR	·	4.5 km	MPC · JPL
119712	2001 XU_{195}	—	December 14, 2001	Socorro	LINEAR	DOR	4.2 km	MPC · JPL
119713	2001 XV_{203}	—	December 11, 2001	Socorro	LINEAR	(5)	2.5 km	MPC · JPL
119714	2001 XG_{205}	—	December 11, 2001	Socorro	LINEAR	MRX	2.0 km	MPC · JPL
119715	2001 XX_{207}	—	December 11, 2001	Socorro	LINEAR	·	3.2 km	MPC · JPL
119716	2001 XH_{208}	—	December 11, 2001	Socorro	LINEAR	·	3.6 km	MPC · JPL
119717	2001 XX_{220}	—	December 15, 2001	Socorro	LINEAR	·	2.6 km	MPC · JPL
119718	2001 XZ_{222}	—	December 15, 2001	Socorro	LINEAR	·	3.4 km	MPC · JPL
119719	2001 XS_{228}	—	December 15, 2001	Socorro	LINEAR	·	3.5 km	MPC · JPL
119720	2001 XB_{236}	—	December 15, 2001	Socorro	LINEAR	·	3.4 km	MPC · JPL
119721	2001 XT_{236}	—	December 15, 2001	Socorro	LINEAR	·	3.2 km	MPC · JPL
119722	2001 XN_{238}	—	December 15, 2001	Socorro	LINEAR	·	3.9 km	MPC · JPL
119723	2001 XO_{244}	—	December 15, 2001	Socorro	LINEAR	(17392)	2.8 km	MPC · JPL
119724	2001 XX_{244}	—	December 15, 2001	Socorro	LINEAR	MAR	2.0 km	MPC · JPL
119725	2001 XO_{256}	—	December 7, 2001	Socorro	LINEAR	·	2.6 km	MPC · JPL
119726	2001 XB_{257}	—	December 7, 2001	Socorro	LINEAR	·	2.3 km	MPC · JPL
119727	2001 XG_{257}	—	December 7, 2001	Socorro	LINEAR	EUN	1.7 km	MPC · JPL
119728	2001 XT_{259}	—	December 9, 2001	Anderson Mesa	LONEOS	·	3.0 km	MPC · JPL
119729	2001 XX_{260}	—	December 10, 2001	Kitt Peak	Spacewatch	·	3.6 km	MPC · JPL
119730	2001 YP_{7}	—	December 17, 2001	Socorro	LINEAR	·	3.7 km	MPC · JPL
119731	2001 YB_{8}	—	December 17, 2001	Socorro	LINEAR	·	3.2 km	MPC · JPL
119732	2001 YM_{8}	—	December 17, 2001	Socorro	LINEAR	·	2.3 km	MPC · JPL
119733	2001 YQ_{10}	—	December 17, 2001	Socorro	LINEAR	HOF	5.1 km	MPC · JPL
119734	2001 YE_{14}	—	December 17, 2001	Socorro	LINEAR	·	3.5 km	MPC · JPL
119735	2001 YS_{17}	—	December 17, 2001	Socorro	LINEAR	·	3.4 km	MPC · JPL
119736	2001 YM_{22}	—	December 18, 2001	Socorro	LINEAR	·	3.4 km	MPC · JPL
119737	2001 YJ_{23}	—	December 18, 2001	Socorro	LINEAR	·	2.1 km	MPC · JPL
119738	2001 YV_{23}	—	December 18, 2001	Socorro	LINEAR	KON	5.0 km	MPC · JPL
119739	2001 YN_{24}	—	December 18, 2001	Socorro	LINEAR	·	2.9 km	MPC · JPL
119740	2001 YP_{28}	—	December 18, 2001	Socorro	LINEAR	·	3.4 km	MPC · JPL
119741	2001 YC_{37}	—	December 18, 2001	Socorro	LINEAR	·	3.2 km	MPC · JPL
119742	2001 YJ_{37}	—	December 18, 2001	Socorro	LINEAR	·	3.8 km	MPC · JPL
119743	2001 YW_{40}	—	December 18, 2001	Socorro	LINEAR	·	3.9 km	MPC · JPL
119744	2001 YN_{42}	—	December 18, 2001	Socorro	LINEAR	(5) · slow	2.3 km	MPC · JPL
119745	2001 YU_{44}	—	December 18, 2001	Socorro	LINEAR	(5) · slow	5.2 km	MPC · JPL
119746	2001 YZ_{51}	—	December 18, 2001	Socorro	LINEAR	·	3.2 km	MPC · JPL
119747	2001 YP_{52}	—	December 18, 2001	Socorro	LINEAR	NYS	2.0 km	MPC · JPL
119748	2001 YO_{53}	—	December 18, 2001	Socorro	LINEAR	·	3.3 km	MPC · JPL
119749	2001 YG_{62}	—	December 18, 2001	Socorro	LINEAR	HOF	4.2 km	MPC · JPL
119750	2001 YL_{64}	—	December 18, 2001	Socorro	LINEAR	·	3.9 km	MPC · JPL
119751	2001 YL_{68}	—	December 18, 2001	Socorro	LINEAR	·	4.3 km	MPC · JPL
119752	2001 YN_{77}	—	December 18, 2001	Socorro	LINEAR	·	4.4 km	MPC · JPL
119753	2001 YO_{90}	—	December 18, 2001	Socorro	LINEAR	KOR	2.4 km	MPC · JPL
119754	2001 YU_{91}	—	December 17, 2001	Palomar	NEAT	EOS	4.0 km	MPC · JPL
119755	2001 YO_{102}	—	December 17, 2001	Socorro	LINEAR	·	3.5 km	MPC · JPL
119756	2001 YT_{105}	—	December 17, 2001	Socorro	LINEAR	·	2.5 km	MPC · JPL
119757	2001 YE_{108}	—	December 17, 2001	Socorro	LINEAR	·	2.3 km	MPC · JPL
119758	2001 YV_{112}	—	December 19, 2001	Socorro	LINEAR	·	3.7 km	MPC · JPL
119759	2001 YX_{112}	—	December 18, 2001	Palomar	NEAT	HYG	6.0 km	MPC · JPL
119760	2001 YN_{113}	—	December 19, 2001	Socorro	LINEAR	·	3.6 km	MPC · JPL
119761	2001 YK_{116}	—	December 18, 2001	Socorro	LINEAR	EUN	4.7 km	MPC · JPL
119762	2001 YS_{117}	—	December 18, 2001	Socorro	LINEAR	·	4.2 km	MPC · JPL
119763	2001 YM_{120}	—	December 20, 2001	Socorro	LINEAR	·	3.2 km	MPC · JPL
119764	2001 YO_{121}	—	December 17, 2001	Socorro	LINEAR	RAF	2.7 km	MPC · JPL
119765	2001 YF_{122}	—	December 17, 2001	Socorro	LINEAR	·	6.5 km	MPC · JPL
119766	2001 YA_{130}	—	December 17, 2001	Socorro	LINEAR	·	3.0 km	MPC · JPL
119767	2001 YQ_{133}	—	December 18, 2001	Kitt Peak	Spacewatch	·	2.3 km	MPC · JPL
119768	2001 YA_{136}	—	December 22, 2001	Socorro	LINEAR	EUN	2.6 km	MPC · JPL
119769	2001 YD_{136}	—	December 22, 2001	Socorro	LINEAR	EUN	2.3 km	MPC · JPL
119770	2001 YK_{136}	—	December 22, 2001	Socorro	LINEAR	EUN	2.4 km	MPC · JPL
119771	2001 YV_{151}	—	December 19, 2001	Palomar	NEAT	·	2.9 km	MPC · JPL
119772	2002 AV_{3}	—	January 8, 2002	Oizumi	T. Kobayashi	·	3.8 km	MPC · JPL
119773	2002 AB_{11}	—	January 11, 2002	Oizumi	T. Kobayashi	URS	7.5 km	MPC · JPL
119774	2002 AP_{28}	—	January 7, 2002	Anderson Mesa	LONEOS	·	3.6 km	MPC · JPL
119775	2002 AX_{29}	—	January 8, 2002	Socorro	LINEAR	EMA	7.7 km	MPC · JPL
119776	2002 AF_{35}	—	January 8, 2002	Socorro	LINEAR	·	2.7 km	MPC · JPL
119777	2002 AN_{35}	—	January 8, 2002	Socorro	LINEAR	·	3.4 km	MPC · JPL
119778	2002 AF_{38}	—	January 9, 2002	Socorro	LINEAR	·	4.6 km	MPC · JPL
119779	2002 AX_{44}	—	January 9, 2002	Socorro	LINEAR	·	2.6 km	MPC · JPL
119780	2002 AA_{46}	—	January 9, 2002	Socorro	LINEAR	·	5.3 km	MPC · JPL
119781	2002 AF_{49}	—	January 9, 2002	Socorro	LINEAR	·	4.9 km	MPC · JPL
119782	2002 AC_{51}	—	January 9, 2002	Socorro	LINEAR	KOR	2.3 km	MPC · JPL
119783	2002 AZ_{51}	—	January 9, 2002	Socorro	LINEAR	KOR	2.9 km	MPC · JPL
119784	2002 AQ_{55}	—	January 9, 2002	Socorro	LINEAR	KOR	2.4 km	MPC · JPL
119785	2002 AM_{57}	—	January 9, 2002	Socorro	LINEAR	HYG	4.9 km	MPC · JPL
119786	2002 AE_{65}	—	January 11, 2002	Socorro	LINEAR	EOS	3.8 km	MPC · JPL
119787	2002 AN_{76}	—	January 8, 2002	Socorro	LINEAR	·	4.6 km	MPC · JPL
119788	2002 AJ_{81}	—	January 9, 2002	Socorro	LINEAR	·	4.3 km	MPC · JPL
119789	2002 AG_{85}	—	January 9, 2002	Socorro	LINEAR	EOS	3.5 km	MPC · JPL
119790	2002 AQ_{87}	—	January 9, 2002	Socorro	LINEAR	·	3.6 km	MPC · JPL
119791	2002 AS_{96}	—	January 8, 2002	Socorro	LINEAR	·	3.6 km	MPC · JPL
119792	2002 AR_{103}	—	January 9, 2002	Socorro	LINEAR	EOS	4.0 km	MPC · JPL
119793	2002 AE_{104}	—	January 9, 2002	Socorro	LINEAR	AGN	1.9 km	MPC · JPL
119794	2002 AL_{107}	—	January 9, 2002	Socorro	LINEAR	KOR	2.6 km	MPC · JPL
119795	2002 AR_{109}	—	January 9, 2002	Socorro	LINEAR	·	3.4 km	MPC · JPL
119796	2002 AB_{113}	—	January 9, 2002	Socorro	LINEAR	NYS	1.7 km	MPC · JPL
119797	2002 AD_{120}	—	January 9, 2002	Socorro	LINEAR	·	2.9 km	MPC · JPL
119798	2002 AM_{127}	—	January 13, 2002	Socorro	LINEAR	·	2.6 km	MPC · JPL
119799	2002 AH_{133}	—	January 8, 2002	Socorro	LINEAR	HOF	5.5 km	MPC · JPL
119800	2002 AG_{134}	—	January 9, 2002	Socorro	LINEAR	·	2.7 km	MPC · JPL

== 119801–119900 ==
back to top

Designation			Discovery			Properties		Ref
Permanent	Provisional	Named after	Date	Site	Discoverer(s)	Category	Diam.	Ref
119801	2002 AO_{135}	—	January 9, 2002	Socorro	LINEAR	HYG	4.5 km	MPC · JPL
119802	2002 AZ_{138}	—	January 9, 2002	Socorro	LINEAR	AGN	2.4 km	MPC · JPL
119803	2002 AE_{139}	—	January 9, 2002	Socorro	LINEAR	·	3.4 km	MPC · JPL
119804	2002 AZ_{139}	—	January 13, 2002	Socorro	LINEAR	·	2.4 km	MPC · JPL
119805	2002 AR_{140}	—	January 13, 2002	Socorro	LINEAR	·	3.2 km	MPC · JPL
119806	2002 AA_{149}	—	January 13, 2002	Socorro	LINEAR	·	4.2 km	MPC · JPL
119807	2002 AD_{151}	—	January 14, 2002	Socorro	LINEAR	·	4.4 km	MPC · JPL
119808	2002 AX_{152}	—	January 14, 2002	Socorro	LINEAR	EOS	5.9 km	MPC · JPL
119809	2002 AD_{154}	—	January 14, 2002	Socorro	LINEAR	·	5.2 km	MPC · JPL
119810	2002 AA_{156}	—	January 14, 2002	Socorro	LINEAR	·	5.8 km	MPC · JPL
119811	2002 AC_{156}	—	January 14, 2002	Socorro	LINEAR	·	6.8 km	MPC · JPL
119812	2002 AS_{157}	—	January 13, 2002	Socorro	LINEAR	THM	4.0 km	MPC · JPL
119813	2002 AV_{159}	—	January 13, 2002	Socorro	LINEAR	·	2.9 km	MPC · JPL
119814	2002 AY_{159}	—	January 13, 2002	Socorro	LINEAR	·	5.3 km	MPC · JPL
119815	2002 AY_{169}	—	January 14, 2002	Socorro	LINEAR	·	4.8 km	MPC · JPL
119816	2002 AC_{170}	—	January 14, 2002	Socorro	LINEAR	KOR	2.5 km	MPC · JPL
119817	2002 AY_{170}	—	January 14, 2002	Socorro	LINEAR	THM	5.0 km	MPC · JPL
119818	2002 AO_{172}	—	January 14, 2002	Socorro	LINEAR	KOR	2.5 km	MPC · JPL
119819	2002 AE_{173}	—	January 14, 2002	Socorro	LINEAR	·	5.2 km	MPC · JPL
119820	2002 AG_{175}	—	January 14, 2002	Socorro	LINEAR	fast	4.0 km	MPC · JPL
119821	2002 AL_{195}	—	January 13, 2002	Socorro	LINEAR	·	6.7 km	MPC · JPL
119822	2002 AY_{202}	—	January 14, 2002	Socorro	LINEAR	HOF	4.3 km	MPC · JPL
119823	2002 BB_{2}	—	January 22, 2002	Desert Eagle	W. K. Y. Yeung	·	4.3 km	MPC · JPL
119824	2002 BO_{3}	—	January 20, 2002	Anderson Mesa	LONEOS	·	4.8 km	MPC · JPL
119825	2002 BZ_{8}	—	January 18, 2002	Socorro	LINEAR	·	3.5 km	MPC · JPL
119826	2002 BX_{9}	—	January 18, 2002	Socorro	LINEAR	·	5.6 km	MPC · JPL
119827	2002 BE_{10}	—	January 18, 2002	Socorro	LINEAR	·	3.0 km	MPC · JPL
119828	2002 BW_{19}	—	January 22, 2002	Socorro	LINEAR	·	3.7 km	MPC · JPL
119829	2002 BP_{22}	—	January 23, 2002	Socorro	LINEAR	EUN	3.8 km	MPC · JPL
119830	2002 BO_{23}	—	January 23, 2002	Socorro	LINEAR	EUN	2.5 km	MPC · JPL
119831	2002 BM_{28}	—	January 19, 2002	Anderson Mesa	LONEOS	·	6.2 km	MPC · JPL
119832	2002 CL_{2}	—	February 6, 2002	Socorro	LINEAR	·	4.9 km	MPC · JPL
119833	2002 CT_{2}	—	February 3, 2002	Palomar	NEAT	EOS	3.6 km	MPC · JPL
119834	2002 CK_{3}	—	February 3, 2002	Palomar	NEAT	·	4.0 km	MPC · JPL
119835	2002 CC_{8}	—	February 4, 2002	Palomar	NEAT	·	4.7 km	MPC · JPL
119836	2002 CS_{12}	—	February 8, 2002	Fountain Hills	C. W. Juels, P. R. Holvorcem	EUN · slow	2.9 km	MPC · JPL
119837	2002 CY_{12}	—	February 8, 2002	Fountain Hills	C. W. Juels, P. R. Holvorcem	·	4.1 km	MPC · JPL
119838	2002 CA_{16}	—	February 9, 2002	Desert Eagle	W. K. Y. Yeung	THM	3.5 km	MPC · JPL
119839	2002 CX_{17}	—	February 6, 2002	Socorro	LINEAR	·	3.8 km	MPC · JPL
119840	2002 CE_{23}	—	February 5, 2002	Haleakala	NEAT	slow	2.4 km	MPC · JPL
119841	2002 CN_{27}	—	February 6, 2002	Socorro	LINEAR	AGN	2.1 km	MPC · JPL
119842	2002 CN_{35}	—	February 7, 2002	Socorro	LINEAR	·	3.6 km	MPC · JPL
119843	2002 CO_{39}	—	February 11, 2002	Desert Eagle	W. K. Y. Yeung	THM	4.7 km	MPC · JPL
119844	2002 CC_{40}	—	February 5, 2002	Haleakala	NEAT	·	8.0 km	MPC · JPL
119845	2002 CD_{46}	—	February 8, 2002	Palomar	NEAT	·	6.6 km	MPC · JPL
119846 Goshiina	2002 CL_{46}	Goshiina	February 6, 2002	Goodricke-Pigott	R. A. Tucker	·	2.6 km	MPC · JPL
119847	2002 CF_{48}	—	February 3, 2002	Haleakala	NEAT	·	7.1 km	MPC · JPL
119848	2002 CJ_{55}	—	February 7, 2002	Socorro	LINEAR	THM	5.0 km	MPC · JPL
119849	2002 CC_{60}	—	February 6, 2002	Socorro	LINEAR	·	3.1 km	MPC · JPL
119850	2002 CY_{61}	—	February 6, 2002	Socorro	LINEAR	·	3.3 km	MPC · JPL
119851	2002 CG_{62}	—	February 6, 2002	Socorro	LINEAR	EOS	3.9 km	MPC · JPL
119852	2002 CU_{65}	—	February 6, 2002	Socorro	LINEAR	·	3.5 km	MPC · JPL
119853	2002 CR_{75}	—	February 7, 2002	Socorro	LINEAR	fast	1.9 km	MPC · JPL
119854	2002 CY_{76}	—	February 7, 2002	Socorro	LINEAR	·	5.7 km	MPC · JPL
119855	2002 CH_{78}	—	February 7, 2002	Socorro	LINEAR	·	6.7 km	MPC · JPL
119856	2002 CJ_{83}	—	February 7, 2002	Socorro	LINEAR	BRA	2.6 km	MPC · JPL
119857	2002 CX_{83}	—	February 7, 2002	Socorro	LINEAR	THM	4.5 km	MPC · JPL
119858	2002 CN_{94}	—	February 7, 2002	Socorro	LINEAR	MRX	2.0 km	MPC · JPL
119859	2002 CB_{110}	—	February 7, 2002	Socorro	LINEAR	·	4.9 km	MPC · JPL
119860	2002 CE_{120}	—	February 7, 2002	Socorro	LINEAR	KOR	2.7 km	MPC · JPL
119861	2002 CV_{120}	—	February 7, 2002	Socorro	LINEAR	KOR	2.3 km	MPC · JPL
119862	2002 CY_{121}	—	February 7, 2002	Socorro	LINEAR	·	3.4 km	MPC · JPL
119863	2002 CU_{123}	—	February 7, 2002	Socorro	LINEAR	·	5.9 km	MPC · JPL
119864	2002 CA_{132}	—	February 7, 2002	Socorro	LINEAR	·	5.4 km	MPC · JPL
119865	2002 CE_{140}	—	February 8, 2002	Socorro	LINEAR	·	6.8 km	MPC · JPL
119866	2002 CL_{142}	—	February 8, 2002	Socorro	LINEAR	·	2.9 km	MPC · JPL
119867	2002 CW_{144}	—	February 9, 2002	Socorro	LINEAR	EOS	4.2 km	MPC · JPL
119868	2002 CU_{149}	—	February 10, 2002	Socorro	LINEAR	·	3.2 km	MPC · JPL
119869	2002 CY_{162}	—	February 8, 2002	Socorro	LINEAR	HYG	4.8 km	MPC · JPL
119870	2002 CL_{163}	—	February 8, 2002	Socorro	LINEAR	·	4.7 km	MPC · JPL
119871	2002 CP_{167}	—	February 8, 2002	Socorro	LINEAR	·	6.3 km	MPC · JPL
119872	2002 CC_{168}	—	February 8, 2002	Socorro	LINEAR	EOS	4.5 km	MPC · JPL
119873	2002 CN_{168}	—	February 8, 2002	Socorro	LINEAR	·	6.3 km	MPC · JPL
119874	2002 CP_{170}	—	February 8, 2002	Socorro	LINEAR	·	6.0 km	MPC · JPL
119875	2002 CT_{174}	—	February 8, 2002	Socorro	LINEAR	·	5.9 km	MPC · JPL
119876	2002 CO_{195}	—	February 10, 2002	Socorro	LINEAR	THM	3.8 km	MPC · JPL
119877	2002 CF_{202}	—	February 10, 2002	Socorro	LINEAR	·	3.5 km	MPC · JPL
119878	2002 CY_{224}	—	February 7, 2002	Kitt Peak	M. W. Buie	res · 5:12	220 km	MPC · JPL
119879	2002 CE_{238}	—	February 11, 2002	Socorro	LINEAR	·	4.4 km	MPC · JPL
119880	2002 CH_{238}	—	February 11, 2002	Socorro	LINEAR	EOS	3.3 km	MPC · JPL
119881	2002 CA_{239}	—	February 11, 2002	Socorro	LINEAR	EOS	3.6 km	MPC · JPL
119882	2002 CP_{239}	—	February 11, 2002	Socorro	LINEAR	(12739)	3.8 km	MPC · JPL
119883	2002 CE_{241}	—	February 11, 2002	Socorro	LINEAR	526	6.3 km	MPC · JPL
119884	2002 CJ_{241}	—	February 11, 2002	Socorro	LINEAR	·	7.1 km	MPC · JPL
119885	2002 CZ_{244}	—	February 13, 2002	Socorro	LINEAR	·	7.9 km	MPC · JPL
119886	2002 CC_{247}	—	February 15, 2002	Socorro	LINEAR	·	3.2 km	MPC · JPL
119887	2002 CH_{252}	—	February 4, 2002	Anderson Mesa	LONEOS	·	2.2 km	MPC · JPL
119888	2002 CP_{254}	—	February 6, 2002	Kitt Peak	Spacewatch	KOR	2.3 km	MPC · JPL
119889	2002 CX_{254}	—	February 6, 2002	Anderson Mesa	LONEOS	·	6.4 km	MPC · JPL
119890 Zamka	2002 CD_{258}	Zamka	February 6, 2002	Kitt Peak	M. W. Buie	KOR	2.2 km	MPC · JPL
119891	2002 CQ_{261}	—	February 7, 2002	Haleakala	NEAT	·	4.0 km	MPC · JPL
119892	2002 CL_{266}	—	February 7, 2002	Palomar	NEAT	·	5.5 km	MPC · JPL
119893	2002 CF_{272}	—	February 8, 2002	Anderson Mesa	LONEOS	EOS	5.1 km	MPC · JPL
119894	2002 CH_{272}	—	February 8, 2002	Anderson Mesa	LONEOS	EOS	4.7 km	MPC · JPL
119895	2002 CY_{272}	—	February 8, 2002	Anderson Mesa	LONEOS	·	8.0 km	MPC · JPL
119896	2002 CV_{274}	—	February 8, 2002	Kitt Peak	Spacewatch	·	4.0 km	MPC · JPL
119897	2002 CZ_{277}	—	February 7, 2002	Palomar	NEAT	·	4.3 km	MPC · JPL
119898	2002 CO_{289}	—	February 10, 2002	Socorro	LINEAR	EOS	7.7 km	MPC · JPL
119899	2002 CM_{299}	—	February 12, 2002	Socorro	LINEAR	·	5.6 km	MPC · JPL
119900	2002 CK_{306}	—	February 6, 2002	Palomar	NEAT	·	3.7 km	MPC · JPL

== 119901–120000 ==
back to top

Designation			Discovery			Properties		Ref
Permanent	Provisional	Named after	Date	Site	Discoverer(s)	Category	Diam.	Ref
119901	2002 CP_{306}	—	February 6, 2002	Socorro	LINEAR	·	6.7 km	MPC · JPL
119902	2002 DH_{8}	—	February 19, 2002	Socorro	LINEAR	EUN	3.0 km	MPC · JPL
119903	2002 EE_{6}	—	March 12, 2002	Farpoint	G. Hug	SYL · CYB	7.3 km	MPC · JPL
119904	2002 EX_{6}	—	March 6, 2002	Siding Spring	R. H. McNaught	HIL · 3:2	7.7 km	MPC · JPL
119905	2002 EH_{10}	—	March 14, 2002	Palomar	NEAT	·	5.1 km	MPC · JPL
119906	2002 EO_{10}	—	March 11, 2002	Palomar	NEAT	·	5.7 km	MPC · JPL
119907	2002 EJ_{12}	—	March 14, 2002	Desert Eagle	W. K. Y. Yeung	·	1.9 km	MPC · JPL
119908	2002 EO_{23}	—	March 5, 2002	Kitt Peak	Spacewatch	·	4.2 km	MPC · JPL
119909	2002 EL_{28}	—	March 9, 2002	Socorro	LINEAR	·	7.3 km	MPC · JPL
119910	2002 ET_{30}	—	March 9, 2002	Socorro	LINEAR	THM	6.4 km	MPC · JPL
119911	2002 EN_{31}	—	March 10, 2002	Socorro	LINEAR	·	3.8 km	MPC · JPL
119912	2002 EQ_{51}	—	March 12, 2002	Kitt Peak	Spacewatch	·	3.8 km	MPC · JPL
119913	2002 EU_{55}	—	March 13, 2002	Socorro	LINEAR	·	3.9 km	MPC · JPL
119914	2002 EV_{57}	—	March 13, 2002	Socorro	LINEAR	·	5.4 km	MPC · JPL
119915	2002 EX_{78}	—	March 10, 2002	Haleakala	NEAT	EOS	4.0 km	MPC · JPL
119916	2002 ER_{83}	—	March 9, 2002	Socorro	LINEAR	·	4.5 km	MPC · JPL
119917	2002 ER_{84}	—	March 9, 2002	Socorro	LINEAR	·	3.4 km	MPC · JPL
119918	2002 EX_{84}	—	March 9, 2002	Socorro	LINEAR	3:2 · SHU	10 km	MPC · JPL
119919	2002 EG_{85}	—	March 9, 2002	Socorro	LINEAR	THM	3.5 km	MPC · JPL
119920	2002 EW_{88}	—	March 9, 2002	Socorro	LINEAR	·	4.5 km	MPC · JPL
119921	2002 EE_{101}	—	March 6, 2002	Socorro	LINEAR	EMA	9.2 km	MPC · JPL
119922	2002 ES_{112}	—	March 10, 2002	Kitt Peak	Spacewatch	3:2 · SHU	12 km	MPC · JPL
119923	2002 EP_{121}	—	March 11, 2002	Palomar	NEAT	EOS	3.9 km	MPC · JPL
119924	2002 EB_{125}	—	March 12, 2002	Palomar	NEAT	·	5.1 km	MPC · JPL
119925	2002 EY_{129}	—	March 12, 2002	Anderson Mesa	LONEOS	·	5.1 km	MPC · JPL
119926	2002 EL_{132}	—	March 13, 2002	Palomar	NEAT	EMA	5.1 km	MPC · JPL
119927	2002 EK_{135}	—	March 14, 2002	Palomar	NEAT	·	6.5 km	MPC · JPL
119928	2002 EZ_{140}	—	March 12, 2002	Palomar	NEAT	·	3.5 km	MPC · JPL
119929	2002 FE_{7}	—	March 24, 2002	Kvistaberg	Uppsala-DLR Asteroid Survey	·	7.2 km	MPC · JPL
119930	2002 FH_{27}	—	March 20, 2002	Socorro	LINEAR	·	7.0 km	MPC · JPL
119931	2002 FA_{34}	—	March 20, 2002	Socorro	LINEAR	HYG	5.3 km	MPC · JPL
119932	2002 FS_{38}	—	March 30, 2002	Palomar	NEAT	·	3.9 km	MPC · JPL
119933	2002 GN	—	April 3, 2002	Kvistaberg	Uppsala-DLR Asteroid Survey	·	6.8 km	MPC · JPL
119934	2002 GW_{4}	—	April 10, 2002	Palomar	NEAT	·	6.2 km	MPC · JPL
119935	2002 GD_{23}	—	April 15, 2002	Palomar	NEAT	3:2 · SHU	6.5 km	MPC · JPL
119936	2002 GC_{27}	—	April 15, 2002	Kitt Peak	Spacewatch	CYB	5.9 km	MPC · JPL
119937	2002 GR_{49}	—	April 5, 2002	Palomar	NEAT	EOS	4.1 km	MPC · JPL
119938	2002 GQ_{54}	—	April 5, 2002	Palomar	NEAT	·	4.4 km	MPC · JPL
119939	2002 GN_{69}	—	April 8, 2002	Palomar	NEAT	·	6.6 km	MPC · JPL
119940	2002 GQ_{79}	—	April 10, 2002	Palomar	NEAT	·	3.0 km	MPC · JPL
119941	2002 GS_{105}	—	April 11, 2002	Anderson Mesa	LONEOS	EOS	4.7 km	MPC · JPL
119942	2002 GJ_{129}	—	April 12, 2002	Socorro	LINEAR	3:2	7.2 km	MPC · JPL
119943	2002 GJ_{148}	—	April 14, 2002	Socorro	LINEAR	·	4.3 km	MPC · JPL
119944	2002 GN_{171}	—	April 10, 2002	Socorro	LINEAR	3:2	10 km	MPC · JPL
119945	2002 JH_{12}	—	May 4, 2002	Desert Eagle	W. K. Y. Yeung	3:2	8.4 km	MPC · JPL
119946	2002 JD_{53}	—	May 9, 2002	Socorro	LINEAR	HIL · 3:2	13 km	MPC · JPL
119947	2002 JZ_{71}	—	May 8, 2002	Socorro	LINEAR	·	4.3 km	MPC · JPL
119948	2002 JH_{121}	—	May 5, 2002	Palomar	NEAT	·	3.7 km	MPC · JPL
119949	2002 KD	—	May 16, 2002	Fountain Hills	Hills, Fountain	·	5.7 km	MPC · JPL
119950	2002 KF_{2}	—	May 16, 2002	Haleakala	NEAT	3:2	9.1 km	MPC · JPL
119951	2002 KX_{14}	—	May 17, 2002	Palomar	C. A. Trujillo, M. E. Brown	other TNO	389 km	MPC · JPL
119952	2002 LD_{51}	—	June 9, 2002	Socorro	LINEAR	EOS	3.7 km	MPC · JPL
119953	2002 ML	—	June 17, 2002	Socorro	LINEAR	H	1.1 km	MPC · JPL
119954	2002 NR_{24}	—	July 9, 2002	Socorro	LINEAR	H	1.2 km	MPC · JPL
119955	2002 OB_{2}	—	July 17, 2002	Socorro	LINEAR	H	1.1 km	MPC · JPL
119956	2002 PA_{149}	—	August 10, 2002	Cerro Tololo	M. W. Buie	res · 4:7	195 km	MPC · JPL
119957	2002 RB_{106}	—	September 5, 2002	Socorro	LINEAR	·	1.6 km	MPC · JPL
119958	2002 RU_{121}	—	September 7, 2002	Socorro	LINEAR	·	1.5 km	MPC · JPL
119959	2002 SY_{21}	—	September 26, 2002	Palomar	NEAT	·	1.5 km	MPC · JPL
119960	2002 TO_{25}	—	October 2, 2002	Socorro	LINEAR	·	1.4 km	MPC · JPL
119961 Nastasi	2002 TQ_{57}	Nastasi	October 2, 2002	Campo Imperatore	F. Bernardi, M. Di Martino	H	1.2 km	MPC · JPL
119962	2002 TM_{60}	—	October 5, 2002	Socorro	LINEAR	H	1.3 km	MPC · JPL
119963	2002 TE_{68}	—	October 7, 2002	Anderson Mesa	LONEOS	H	1.2 km	MPC · JPL
119964	2002 TU_{226}	—	October 8, 2002	Anderson Mesa	LONEOS	·	2.1 km	MPC · JPL
119965	2002 TT_{265}	—	October 10, 2002	Socorro	LINEAR	·	2.5 km	MPC · JPL
119966	2002 TX_{286}	—	October 10, 2002	Socorro	LINEAR	·	1.3 km	MPC · JPL
119967 Daniellong	2002 TD_{310}	Daniellong	October 4, 2002	Apache Point	SDSS	·	1.5 km	MPC · JPL
119968	2002 UF	—	October 18, 2002	Palomar	NEAT	·	1.9 km	MPC · JPL
119969	2002 UU_{17}	—	October 30, 2002	Kvistaberg	Uppsala-DLR Asteroid Survey	·	1.5 km	MPC · JPL
119970	2002 VL_{21}	—	November 5, 2002	Socorro	LINEAR	·	1.9 km	MPC · JPL
119971	2002 VZ_{70}	—	November 7, 2002	Socorro	LINEAR	·	1.5 km	MPC · JPL
119972	2002 VG_{124}	—	November 14, 2002	Socorro	LINEAR	·	1.1 km	MPC · JPL
119973	2002 VK_{124}	—	November 11, 2002	Socorro	LINEAR	·	1.4 km	MPC · JPL
119974	2002 VP_{127}	—	November 15, 2002	Socorro	LINEAR	H	990 m	MPC · JPL
119975	2002 VB_{128}	—	November 15, 2002	Socorro	LINEAR	H	1.4 km	MPC · JPL
119976	2002 VR_{130}	—	November 7, 2002	Kitt Peak	M. W. Buie	centaur	24 km	MPC · JPL
119977	2002 WB_{3}	—	November 23, 2002	Palomar	NEAT	V	1.2 km	MPC · JPL
119978	2002 WK_{4}	—	November 24, 2002	Palomar	NEAT	V	1.4 km	MPC · JPL
119979	2002 WC_{19}	—	November 16, 2002	Palomar	Palomar	twotino · moon	338 km	MPC · JPL
119980	2002 XW_{3}	—	December 2, 2002	Socorro	LINEAR	·	1.3 km	MPC · JPL
119981	2002 XP_{4}	—	December 1, 2002	Haleakala	NEAT	(5)	2.4 km	MPC · JPL
119982	2002 XX_{29}	—	December 5, 2002	Socorro	LINEAR	·	1.7 km	MPC · JPL
119983	2002 XB_{39}	—	December 7, 2002	Ondřejov	P. Kušnirák, P. Pravec	·	1.4 km	MPC · JPL
119984	2002 XE_{46}	—	December 10, 2002	Palomar	NEAT	·	1.4 km	MPC · JPL
119985	2002 XO_{47}	—	December 10, 2002	Socorro	LINEAR	·	2.3 km	MPC · JPL
119986	2002 XZ_{52}	—	December 10, 2002	Socorro	LINEAR	·	3.1 km	MPC · JPL
119987	2002 XA_{54}	—	December 10, 2002	Socorro	LINEAR	·	4.9 km	MPC · JPL
119988	2002 XT_{63}	—	December 11, 2002	Socorro	LINEAR	·	2.8 km	MPC · JPL
119989	2002 XB_{76}	—	December 11, 2002	Socorro	LINEAR	·	1.5 km	MPC · JPL
119990	2002 XU_{78}	—	December 11, 2002	Socorro	LINEAR	·	1.8 km	MPC · JPL
119991	2002 XV_{81}	—	December 11, 2002	Socorro	LINEAR	·	1.5 km	MPC · JPL
119992	2002 XZ_{87}	—	December 12, 2002	Palomar	NEAT	MAR	2.7 km	MPC · JPL
119993 Acabá	2002 XT_{105}	Acabá	December 5, 2002	Kitt Peak	M. W. Buie	·	1.5 km	MPC · JPL
119994	2002 YJ	—	December 27, 2002	Anderson Mesa	LONEOS	·	1.5 km	MPC · JPL
119995	2002 YU	—	December 27, 2002	Anderson Mesa	LONEOS	V	1.3 km	MPC · JPL
119996	2002 YO_{1}	—	December 27, 2002	Anderson Mesa	LONEOS	(2076)	1.5 km	MPC · JPL
119997	2002 YD_{6}	—	December 28, 2002	Kitt Peak	Spacewatch	·	2.0 km	MPC · JPL
119998	2002 YN_{6}	—	December 28, 2002	Anderson Mesa	LONEOS	·	2.5 km	MPC · JPL
119999	2002 YC_{8}	—	December 28, 2002	Anderson Mesa	LONEOS	·	1.4 km	MPC · JPL
120000	2002 YA_{11}	—	December 31, 2002	Socorro	LINEAR	·	1.2 km	MPC · JPL

back to top

== See also ==
- Meanings of minor-planet names: 119001–120000
