= Meanings of minor-planet names: 119001–120000 =

As minor planet discoveries are confirmed, they are given a permanent number by the IAU's Minor Planet Center (MPC), and the discoverers can then submit names for them, following the IAU's naming conventions. The list below concerns those minor planets in the specified number-range that have received names, and explains the meanings of those names.

Official naming citations of newly named small Solar System bodies are approved and published in a bulletin by IAU's Working Group for Small Bodies Nomenclature (WGSBN). Before May 2021, citations were published in MPC's Minor Planet Circulars for many decades. Recent citations can also be found on the JPL Small-Body Database (SBDB). Until his death in 2016, German astronomer Lutz D. Schmadel compiled these citations into the Dictionary of Minor Planet Names (DMP) and regularly updated the collection.

Based on Paul Herget's The Names of the Minor Planets, Schmadel also researched the unclear origin of numerous asteroids, most of which had been named prior to World War II. This article incorporates text from this source, which is in the public domain: SBDB New namings may only be added to this list below after official publication as the preannouncement of names is condemned. The WGSBN publishes a comprehensive guideline for the naming rules of non-cometary small Solar System bodies.

== 119001–119100 ==
Named minor planet	Provisional	This minor planet was named for...	Ref · Catalog
There are no named minor planets in this number range

== 119101–119200 ==
back to top

Named minor planet	Provisional	This minor planet was named for...	Ref · Catalog
119195 Margaretgreer	2001 QF_{111}	Margaret Hatcher Greer (b. 1951) is a retired teacher who taught at Walter Jackson Elementary and Ben Davis Elementary.	IAU · 119195

== 119201–119300 ==
back to top

Named minor planet	Provisional	This minor planet was named for...	Ref · Catalog
119248 Corbally	2001 RS_{10}	Christopher J. Corbally S.J. (born 1946) was ordained in the Society of Jesus and earned a PhD in astronomy. He continues a long career in astronomy where his contributions have included areas of multiple stellar systems, stellar spectral classification, galactic structure, star formation and telescope technology.	JPL · 119248

== 119301–119400 ==
back to top

Named minor planet	Provisional	This minor planet was named for...	Ref · Catalog
There are no named minor planets in this number range

== 119401–119500 ==
back to top

Named minor planet	Provisional	This minor planet was named for...	Ref · Catalog
There are no named minor planets in this number range

== 119501–119600 ==
back to top

Named minor planet	Provisional	This minor planet was named for...	Ref · Catalog
There are no named minor planets in this number range

== 119601–119700 ==
back to top

Named minor planet	Provisional	This minor planet was named for...	Ref · Catalog
119602 Italodimaria	2001 WD_{15}	Italo Di Maria (1942–2002) was a town clerk in Sicily and the father of Dario Di Maria, one of the Farra d'Isonzo amateur astronomers who discovered this minor planet.	IAU · 119602

== 119701–119800 ==
back to top

Named minor planet	Provisional	This minor planet was named for...	Ref · Catalog
There are no named minor planets in this number range

== 119801–119900 ==
back to top

Named minor planet	Provisional	This minor planet was named for...	Ref · Catalog
119846 Goshiina	2002 CL_{46}	Go Shiina (born 1974) is a Japanese music composer and arranger. He has composed music for many video games, anime series and films, including the soundtrack of the Demon Slayer: Kimetsu no Yaiba anime adaption with Yuki Kajiura.	IAU · 119846
119890 Zamka	2002 CD_{258}	George D. Zamka (born 1962) is a retired American astronaut. Zamka piloted the Space Shuttle Discovery in its October 2007 mission to the International Space Station. He was the commander of the Space Shuttle mission in February 2010, an International Space Station assembly mission.	JPL · 119890

== 119901–120000 ==
back to top

Named minor planet	Provisional	This minor planet was named for...	Ref · Catalog
119961 Nastasi	2002 TQ_{57}	Alessandro Nastasi (b. 1983), an Italian astronomer.	IAU · 119961
119967 Daniellong	2002 TD_{310}	Daniel Long (born 1961), American astronomer with the Sloan Digital Sky Survey	JPL · 119967
119993 Acabá	2002 XT_{105}	Joseph Acabá (born 1967) is an American astronaut. He flew to the International Space Station in 2009, 2012 and 2018 aboard both the Space Shuttle and the Soyuz spacecraft. On his first flight, he participated in space walks to assemble the International Space Station. As of July 2020, he has spent 306 days in space.	JPL · 119993

back to top

Preceded by 118,001–119,000	Meanings of minor-planet names List of minor planets: 119,001–120,000	Succeeded by 120,001–121,000
