= Power Strike II (Master System video game) =

1993 video game

- Developer(s): Compile
- Publisher(s): Sega
- Director(s): Takayuki Watanabe
- Producer(s): Masamitsu Niitani
- Designer(s): Zod Hoshijima
- Programmer(s): Takayuki Hirono
- Artist(s): Hiroshi Ryūōin
- Composer(s): Tsuyoshi Matsushima
- Series: Aleste
- Platform(s): Master System
- Release: EU: September 1993
- Genre(s): Vertically scrolling shooter
- Mode(s): Single-player

Power Strike II is a 1993 vertically scrolling shooter video game developed by Compile and published by Sega for the Master System. Part of the Aleste series, the game takes place across the seas and skies near Italy during the 1930s, with the player assuming the role of a Pothunter piloting the Falcon Flyer aircraft to shoot down sky pirates, former pilots that turned to air piracy for survival as result of the Great Depression. It retains the same gameplay conventions as the original Power Strike, with the player fighting endless waves of enemies while avoiding collision with their projectiles and other obstacles.

Power Strike II for the Master System was created by most of the same Compile personnel who worked on previous Aleste entries. Because of its late release during the console's lifecycle, it has become quite in demand and is considered a sought after item on the game collecting market. It was also never released in Japan until its inclusion on the Aleste Collection for Nintendo Switch and PlayStation 4 in 2020. The game garnered generally positive reception from critics, while retrospective commentary has been equally positive.

== Gameplay ==
Gameplay screenshot

Power Strike II is a vertical-scrolling shoot 'em up game. The plot takes place in the early 1930s, where people have lived in poverty since the Great Depression, which led many pilots to become sky pirates for survival after being laid off from their jobs. The player takes on the role of a Pothunter, pilot of the Falcon Flyer aircraft who earns a living by shooting down pirates. Prior to starting, a configuration menu is presented where multiple option settings can be altered.

Its gameplay follows the same conventions as the original Power Strike, albeit with improvements carried from Aleste 2; The player controls Falcon Flyer through eight increasingly difficult stages over a constantly scrolling background, populated with an assortment of enemy forces and obstacles, and the scenery never stops moving until a boss is reached, which must be fought to progress further. The player has a main weapon that can be powered up by collecting "Power Chips".

There are also seven different special weapons that can be picked up and upgraded if the same weapon is picked up that is currently being used. The Falcon Flyer is equipped with a speed setting, which can be increased or decreased across three levels by pressing its dedicated button. The player can also collect two spinning satellites, which affect the strength, speed, and spread of the ship's main weapon. New to the Aleste series is the addition of a charged attack, which is fired by letting go the fire button after a determined time period. If hit while a special weapon is equipped, the player will lose the special weapon but remain alive. Getting hit without a special weapon will result in losing a life, as well as a penalty of decreasing the Falcon Flyer's firepower to its original state and the game is over once all lives are lost, though the player has limited continues to keep playing.

== Development and release ==
Power Strike II for the Master System was created by most of the same personnel at Compile who worked on previous Aleste entries. It was directed by Takayuki "Kerol" Watanabe, with Masamitsu Niitani serving as producer. Zod Hoshijima acted as planner, with Takayuki Hirono taking over the role of main programmer. Hiroshi Ryūōin and members under the pseudonyms "Ajari" and "Great Samurai" were responsible for the pixel art, while the sound was handled by Tsuyoshi "PSG Factory" Matsushima. Other people also collaborated with its creation, including Gennosuke Yumi, "Winner", and Hiroshi "Tan" Konishi.

Hirono recounted its development process in the 2020 book Aleste History, stating that he took a storyline that came down from Compile, but didn't know the details aside from the fact that the Master System was still active in Europe at the time of production. Development lasted over four months, with staff members working for 20 hours a day and sleeping at the company. The fictional 1930s Italian setting was conceived by a Compile staffer known as "Sato", as the game was being released in Europe. The ship's main shot was strengthened due to being a weak weapon in Aleste 2, while the weapon leveling system from Zanac was also altered for the title. Hirono claimed that the charged attack was introduced due to his previous experience with R-Type, as he could not attack midway while charging the shot. Hirono adopted the idea after thinking what kind of attack would help him without breaking the game, telling Watanabe that it would be convenient to charge while shooting.

Power Strike II was published by Sega in September 1993, and was housed in a 4-megabit cartridge. Because of its late release during the console's lifecycle, the title is harder to find and more expensive than earlier European Master System games, becoming a rare collector's item that commands high prices on the secondary game collecting market. As the European cartridge is encoded for PAL regions, it exhibits faster gameplay when played on a North American (NTSC) Master System. It was also never released in Japan until its inclusion on the Aleste Collection for Nintendo Switch and PlayStation 4 in 2020, which marked the game's first appearance in the region. An album containing the game's original soundtrack and other games featured in the Aleste Collection was distributed in Japan by Wave Master on April 21, 2022.

== Reception ==
Reception

Review scores
Publication	Score
HobbyConsolas	78/100
Joypad	64/100
Mean Machines Sega	92/100
Micromanía	89/100
Player One	65%
Gamers	1-
Mega Force	72%
Megablast	83%
Sega Master Force	71/100
Sega Power	72%
Sega Pro	89%
Sega Zone	67/100
TodoSega	81/100

Power Strike II for the Master System received generally positive reception from critics. Sega Power's John Cantlie commended the game's variety of levels, graphics, and speed for showcasing the console's potential. However, he also criticized this aspect for making enemies difficult to distinguish, in addition to the "mouldy" gameplay and collision detection issues. Gamers' Julian Eggebrecht found its plot to be absurd and criticized the music for being occasionally boring. Nevertheless, he regarded it as the best shooting game on the platform, praising the graphical presentation for its visual effects and level of detail, playability and technical performance for the number of sprites on-screen.

HobbyConsolas' Antonio "Boke" Caravaca gave positive remarks to the introduction of numerous gameplay settings, improved visuals compared to the original Power Strike, audio and large variety of enemies, but noted its excessive difficulty. Regardless, he called it one of the best titles for the system. Sega Pro's Mark Hill and Sam Hickman praised the colorful and detailed graphics, sound, frantic gameplay, fast action and controls, but found its ideas dated. Mean Machines Sega's Paul Davies and Richard Leadbetter also commended the overall presentation, lack of sprite flickering, sound department, playability and longevity. Micromanía's Óscar Santos García wrote that "It is the best shooter made for the Master System."

Sega Master Force's three reviewers found Power Strike II to be a decent and challenging shoot 'em up, commending its audio and longevity but felt mixed regarding the graphics and playability. In a similar manner, Sega Zone's Josse Bilson commended its addictive factor and playability but felt mixed towards the audiovisual presentation. In contrast to Sega Master Force's three reviewers and Bilson, Spanish magazine TodoSega praised the variety of stages and enemies, speed and music but, like Caravaca, noted its high difficulty. French publication Joypad expressed preference towards R-Type, recommending the title for younger players or those who want to complete every shoot 'em up on the Master System.

Mega Force's Jean-Marc Demoly gave the game a positive outlook, but ultimately regarded it as a "shoot 'em up full of implausibilities." Player One's Véronique Boissarie criticized the difficulty, lack of originality and playability, as well as expressing mixed feelings towards its longevity. However, Boissarie gave praise to both visuals and audio, ultimately recommending it to shoot 'em up fans. Megablast's Richard Löwenstein also recommended it for shooter fans, highlighting its technical performance, gameplay, controls, visuals and audio.

=== Retrospective coverage ===
Retrospective commentaries for Power Strike II have been equally positive. Alex Vormbrock of SHMUPS! (a classic network of GameSpy) stated that its visuals were the best seen on Master System due to the number of sprites on-screen without flickering or slowdown, artstyle and detailed backgrounds. Vormbrock also praised the sound effects and gameplay similar to other games in the Aleste series, but criticized the ship's overall speed for being too fast and found the music above-average. Retro Gamer's Nick Thorpe agreed with Vormbrock, stating that the graphics and sound are amongst the best on the console. However, Thorpe wrote that "In fact, you could argue that Compile maybe even pushed the machine a little too hard, as you can see sprite break-up and other telltale signs of a struggling console." He also gave positive remarks to its level design and power-up system. Concurring with Vormbrock and Thorpe, Hardcore Gaming 101's Kurt Kalata found it to be an impressive 8-bit shoot 'em up, writing that "Outside of the premise and setting, there's not much that's particularly unique about Power Strike II compared to other titles in the Aleste series, but it's also better than pretty much every other shooter on the system (not that there were very many), including its predecessor."
