= Ruiner Pinball =

1995 video game

- Cover art by Steve Lang
- Developer: High Voltage Software
- Publisher: Atari Corporation
- Designers: Mike Baker; Scott Corley
- Programmer: Scott Corley
- Artist: Mike Baker
- Platform: Atari Jaguar
- Release: NA: November 6, 1995; EU: December 1995
- Genre: Pinball
- Modes: Single-player, multiplayer

Ruiner Pinball is a 1995 pinball video game developed by High Voltage Software (HVS) and published by Atari Corporation for the Atari Jaguar. The game features two different pinball tables: the nuclear war-inspired Ruiner, and the medieval-themed Tower. Each table contains targets for the player to hit with the ball, increasing their score before the ball is lost. It was marketed as the first title to support the ProController, a redesigned Jaguar controller that added three more face buttons and two triggers.

As long-time fans of pinball games, HVS proposed the Ruiner pinball concept to Atari, who later requested a second table in the game. The game earned disapproval from game critics, who took issue with the game's audiovisual elements, controls, and unrealistic physics. Later reviewers were mixed on the game's reception, in retrospect. In 2022, it was included in the Atari 50 compilation.

== Gameplay ==
Ruiner Pinball includes two pinball tables: Ruiner (left) and Tower (right)

Ruiner Pinball is a pinball game that features a choice of two different pinball tables: Ruiner and Tower. Ruiner is a double-width table with four flippers on each side, the style of which is inspired by the impending nuclear war of the 1960s. Tower is a three-screen high table with a set of flippers on each area, styled as a medieval fantasy setting with an evil sorceress.

Each table has its own main objective: in Ruiner, the player must lower the DEFCON level from 5 to 1 and launch a counterattack, while navigating the ball using interconnected ramps to move between sides. In Tower, the player must defeat the sorceress by casting three magic spells to destroy the castle and escape. The player's score increases by hitting targets before the ball is lost. Both tables also have features such as extra balls and multi-ball play. The player can choose between three difficulty levels, as well as configure the number of players, and the number and texture of the ball(s).

== Development and release ==
Ruiner Pinball was created by High Voltage Software (HVS), which previously worked on a video game adaptation of the 1992 sports comedy film White Men Can't Jump for Atari Jaguar. The game was programmed by Scott Corley as his first work in the video game industry. Corley entered the gaming industry in 1993 as one of the first members to work at HVS before becoming the company's vice president of software development. He was also designer of the Ruiner table, while artist Mike Baker designed the Tower table. HVS proposed a pinball game to Atari Corporation, as many of the company's staff were pinball fans. According to Corley, the game was named "Ruiner" after the song of the same name from the album The Downward Spiral by Nine Inch Nails. As development continued, Atari requested a second table. Baker created the game's artwork on a large hand-painted board, which was scanned into Deluxe Paint slowly, part by part. The cover art was illustrated by Steve Lang.

The game was first showcased at the 1994 Summer Consumer Electronics Show, announced for release in the second quarter of 1995 under the name Ruiner. It made additional appearances at tradeshows such as the 1995 ECTS Spring event and E3 1995. The game was later scheduled for an August release date and was also showcased during an event hosted by Atari dubbed "Fun 'n' Games Day" under its final title, Ruiner Pinball. It was first published by Atari in North America on November 6, 1995, and later in Europe in December 1995. The game was marketed as the first to support the ProController, a redesigned Atari Jaguar controller that added three more face buttons and two triggers. In 2022, Ruiner Pinball was re-released for the first time as part of the Atari 50 compilation, porting the game to Nintendo Switch, PlayStation 4, Xbox One, and Windows PCs.

== Reception ==
Reception

Review scores
Publication	Score
Consoles +	80%
EP Daily	4/10
M! Games	54%
Next Generation	2/5
Atari Fan	75/100
Atari Gaming Headquarters	5/10
The Atari Times	20%
Game Zero Magazine	15.0/50
ST Magazine	52%
Ultimate Future Games	23%
VideoGames	5/10

Ruiner Pinball received generally unfavorable reviews. Reviewers compared the game unfavorably to other contemporary pinball games such as Crüe Ball, Dragon's Fury, and Dragon's Revenge. Evan Morris and Bryan Carter of Game Zero Magazine criticized the game's visuals, music, and ball physics, instead recommending pinball titles for rival consoles. Andy Robertson, writing for Ultimate Future Games and The Atari Times, lambasted its audiovisual presentation, controls, and limited number of tables, stating that "Ruiner is not even a very good pinball". The Electric Playground's Shane Garber described the gameplay as tedious, while criticizing the busy visuals for obscuring the ball's position. MAN!AC's Robert Bannert also described how several game elements are lost in the hand-drawn backgrounds, and additionally criticized the lack of bonus rounds.

Véronique Boissarie of Consoles + praised Ruiner's colorful graphics and playability, feeling that it was an overall well-designed and original pinball game. Marc Abramson of the French ST Magazine faulted the game's audiovisual presentation, controls, and unrealistic physics. VideoGames felt that the game failed to simulate the feeling of a real pinball game, while criticizing the graphics and layout of both tables. GamePro described it as an enjoyable but unexceptional title, saying that it "looks like a plain old 16-bit pinball game". Next Generation described how the animations and multi-level tables made good use of the video game format, but felt that these elements were "superfluous" due to the flawed gameplay and physics. Atari Gaming Headquarters' Keita Iida wrote that "Ruiner Pinball resembles most 16-bit pinball games like Alien Crush and Crüe Ball in that realism is discarded".

Retrospective commentary for Ruiner Pinball has been mixed. Retro Gamer labelled it as a fun homage to Dragon's Fury and Alien Crush, while PCMag called it the best pinball game on the Atari Jaguar. Author Andy Slaven praised the game's colorful visuals, but felt that the unrealistic physics failed to capture the feeling of pinball. In a retrospective review for The Atari Times, David Sherwin felt that the audiovisual elements for the Ruiner table were much stronger than the Tower table.
