= Demon's Tilt =

2019 video game

- Developer: Adam Ferrando (WIZNWAR)
- Publisher: Flarb
- Composer: Charlie Heinrich (ec2151)
- Platforms: macOS; Windows; Xbox One; Nintendo Switch; PlayStation 4
- Release: macOS, Windows, Xbox One: WW: December 13, 2019; Nintendo Switch: WW: December 23, 2019; PlayStation 4: NA: July 28, 2020; PAL: November 9, 2020
- Genre: Pinball
- Mode: Single-player

Demon's Tilt is a pinball video game by American developer Adam Ferrando under his handle WIZNWAR, released on Steam Early Access in January 2019, with eventual publication on Windows, macOS, PlayStation 4, Xbox One, and Nintendo Switch in December 2019. The game features occult inspiration pulled from H.P. Lovecraft, tarot and other horror themes. The game has been called a spiritual successor to the Crush Pinball series of pinball video games, namely Devil's Crush. A sequel, Xenotilt, was released on Steam Early Access on August 18th, 2023, with a full release on November 12th, 2024.

== Gameplay ==
The start of a Demon's Tilt game, showing off the second tier ("Lilith") of the game board. Gameplay elements like the tilt meter, score, and ritual objectives are displayed as overlays

Demon's Tilt occurs primarily on a pinball board that spans across three separate screens, one for each of the sections: Lilith, Hermit and Zodiac. They contain different objectives or items which help add to the player's multiplier score. The player is given three balls per game and moves the ball around the board by four pairs of flippers (two pairs on the first tier, the remaining two divided up among the other two tiers). By shaking the table, the trajectory of the ball can be shifted with the game's Nudge feature, designed to help the player control the ball. The player will face a number of enemy characters and obstacles around the board, along with boss characters that can cause ball loss. Unlike other pinball games, the tilt mechanics add a "hack 'n slash" gameplay element, allowing the player to use the ball to attack enemies and avoid obstacles. Another gameplay element is the incorporation of bullet hell mechanics, where enemy characters will fill the board with bullets that halt ball progress. A game over is triggered by the player losing all of their three balls.

== Development ==
Development of Demon's Tilt was inspired by an email chain between Adam Ferrando ("WIZNWAR") and Ralph Barbagallo of FLARB, LLC, about their shared love of video pinball games from the early 90s. Discussions between the two brought up their main inspirations for developing the a game heavily inspired by the 16-bit Crush Pinball series of games, drawing heavy inspiration from Alien Crush on the Turbografx-16, Devil's Crush also on the Turbografx-16 and Sega Mega Drive, and Jaki Crush on the Super Famicom, along with KAZe's pinball games for the 32-bit Sega Saturn. Development of the game began some time in 2017, with the prototype of Demon's Tilt being finished in late-2017. Development on the main game began in April 2018 after Barbagallo approached Ferrando about publishing the game. The game was released for Steam Early Access on January 22, 2019, with a full release on December 13, 2019.

Music for the game was composed by ec2151, and tries to emulate 16-bit video game chiptune soundtracks, with the Yamaha YM2612 specifically being a reference for style and sound limitations.

== Reception ==
Reception

Review score
Publication	Score
Nintendo Life	8/10

Demon's Tilt has received generally positive reviews. PC Gamer reviewed the Steam Early Access release positively, praising the game mechanics and bullet hell game mechanics. PC Gamer to date has not given a full review of the commercial release, but featured it on their list "The hidden gems of PC gaming in 2019". Rock, Paper, Shotgun, also reviewing the Early Access release, praised the game's chaotic gameplay along with the chiptune soundtrack and featured it on a "best new indie games" list. Nintendo Life gave the released game an 8/10, praising the visuals, the soundtrack, and the gameplay but noted that the Switch release lacked some of the extra visuals of the PC release.
