= Dr. Fetus' Mean Meat Machine =

- Developer: Team Meat
- Publishers: Headup Games; Thunderful Games
- Engine: Unity
- Platforms: Nintendo Switch; PlayStation 4; PlayStation 5; Windows; Xbox One; Xbox Series X/S
- Release: WW: June 22, 2023
- Genre: Puzzle
- Mode: Single-player

Dr. Fetus' Mean Meat Machine is a 2023 puzzle video game developed by Team Meat. A spinoff of Super Meat Boy and Super Meat Boy Forever, it was published by Thunderful and Headup Games for multiple systems in June 2023. The game was inspired by Dr. Robotnik's Mean Bean Machine.

== Plot ==
After his last attempt to beat Meat Boy, Dr. Fetus tries to create a clone of Meat Boy via various recordings of him and his girlfriend, Bandage Girl. His plan to create the clone is to put the imperfect clones thorough a series of tests based on the worlds and enemies of Super Meat Boy and Super Meat Boy Forever. After many clone mutations and personally fighting them, Dr. Fetus finally has enough data to make the perfect Meat Boy and sends it into a cloning device to make it. After killing the first one with a plasma shotgun, he proceeds to spawn as many as he can and prepares to launch a spike ball at them but gets sucked into a Warp Zone before he can do it. As he gets whisked away, the ball fires and destroys the machine controlling the spawn of clones and starts spewing out Meat clones as the screen fades to black.

== Gameplay ==
Dr. Fetus' Mean Meat Machine is a spinoff of Super Meat Boy and Super Meat Boy Forever, and it features locations and characters from those games. Gameplay is similar to Puyo Puyo and other falling block puzzle games. Players must get the falling clones to the bottom and match them without touching any hazards. Touching hazards causes the game to reset to a previous checkpoint. Checkpoints are created by getting matches. As players get more matches, more hazards are placed. There are 120 levels.

== Development ==
The game is inspired by Dr. Robotnik's Mean Bean Machine. Thunderful and Headup Games published Dr. Fetus' Mean Meat Machine for Windows, PlayStation 4 and 5, Xbox One and Series X/S, and Switch on June 22, 2023.

== Reception ==
On Metacritic, Dr. Fetus' Mean Meat Machine received positive reviews for Windows and mixed reviews for the Switch version. Nintendo Life called it "a serviceable puzzler" but said it has low replayability if players are uninterested in making an already difficult game even harder. Slant Magazine praised its ability to retain the core elements of a Meat Boy game while transposing them to another genre. They also felt the difficulty made solving levels feel "incredibly rewarding" without it becoming too frustrating, thanks to the checkpoints. While praising the concept, TouchArcade felt Dr. Fetus' Mean Meat Machine relies too much on luck to bypass the hazards, and they recommended Puyo Puyo instead. Push Square enjoyed the game's presentation and said it has an interesting twist. However, they felt the gameplay is repetitive and called the difficulty "brutally unfair".
