= Aleste Gaiden =

1989 video game

- Cover art of the autumn special edition of Disc Station, featuring Aleste Gaiden
- Developer: Compile
- Publisher: Compile
- Producer: Masamitsu Niitani
- Designers: Kōji Mizuta; Zod Hoshijima
- Programmers: Kōji Mizuta; Takafumi Tanida
- Artist: Hiroshi Ryūōin
- Composers: Masanobu Tsukamoto; Keiji Takeuchi; Toshiaki Sakoda
- Series: Aleste
- Platform: MSX2
- Release: JP: September 8, 1989 (Disc Station Special 4 Autumn)
- Genre: Vertically scrolling shooter
- Mode: Single-player

Aleste Gaiden (Note: Japanese: アレスタ外伝, Hepburn: Aresuta Gaiden) is a 1989 vertically scrolling shooter video game developed and published by Compile for the MSX2 home computer. A follow-up to Aleste (1988), it was included as part of the autumn special edition of Disc Station, a monthly disk publication by Compile. It is a sidestory to the main series, taking place in an alternative continuity. Controlling the soldier Raymond Waizen, protagonist of the first game wearing a cybernetic ninja suit, the player must overthrow the supercomputer DIA 51 by fight waves of enemies and bosses, while avoiding collision with their projectiles and other obstacles.

== Gameplay ==
Gameplay screenshot.

Aleste Gaiden is a vertical-scrolling shoot 'em up game. The plot takes place in an alternative continuity and follows Raymond Waizen, protagonist of the first Aleste game, who wears a cybernetic ninja suit in order to overthrow the supercomputer DIA 51. Its gameplay differs from the original entry; the player controls Raymond instead of a ship through five increasingly difficult stages over a constantly scrolling background, populated with an assortment of enemy forces and obstacles such as pits that must be avoided by jumping, and the scenery never stops moving until a boss is reached, which must be fought to progress further.

Unlike other Aleste titles, enemies move in a preset formation instead of being determined by an artificial intelligence. There are three types of power-ups that can be collected by the player, which come in capsules marked with a chikara symbol, as well as equip Raymond with shadow clones of himself. Gaiden employs a checkpoint system in which a downed player will start off at the beginning of the checkpoint they managed to reach before dying. However, the player respawn immediately when fighting a boss. Getting hit will result in losing a life, as well as a penalty of decreasing Raymond's firepower to his original state and the game is over once all lives are lost.

== Development and release ==
Aleste Gaiden was created by Compile, which had previously developed Aleste (1988) for Master System and MSX2. It was produced by Masamitsu Niitani, with Kōji Mizuta and Zod Hoshijima serving as the co-designers. Mizuta also acted as co-programmer alongside Takafumi Tanida, while character designs were provided by Hiroshi Ryūōin. The music was scored by Masanobu "Mats" Tsukamoto, Toshiaki Sakoda (of MUSHA), and Keiji Takeuchi under direction of Masatomo Miyamoto. Other staff members collaborated with its production as well. The game was included as part of the autumn special edition of Disc Station, a monthly disk publication by Compile, released on September 8, 1989. Due to not receiving a full retail title, the autumn edition of Disc Station commands high prices on the secondary game collecting market.

== Reception ==
Reception

Review scores
| Publication | Score |
|---|---|
| MSX Club | 4/6 |
| MSX Gids | 5/5 |

Aleste Gaiden received a mixture of opinions from reviewers. MSX Gids' José Herps applauded the graphical production, audio and overally quality. MSX Club's Jesús Manuel Montané and Ramón Casillas expressed similar thoughts about the visuals, addictive factor, pacing and sound, but felt mixed regarding its presentation and originality. SHMUPS! (a classic network of GameSpy) stated that "the game isn't all that bad, it just falls in the 'Above Average' category. The fact is that we expect higher quality games from Compile, and being the worst game in a series that has only fantastic games isn't that a bad thing at all." Hardcore Gaming 101's Kurt Kalata opined that "Considering Aleste Gaiden wasn't a full retail release, it's not exactly fair to judge it against the standards of the other games. It is a little short and on the easy side, but it still maintains the core elements of a solid Compile shooter."
