= Robo Aleste =

1992 video game

- European cover art
- Developer: Compile
- Publishers: JP: Compile; EU: Sega; NA: Tengen
- Series: Aleste
- Platform: Sega CD
- Release: JP: November 27, 1992; EU: April 1993; NA: August 1993
- Genre: Vertically scrolling shooter
- Mode: Single-player

Robo Aleste, released in Japan as Dennin Aleste (電忍アレスタ), is a 1992 vertically scrolling shooter video game developed and published by Compile for the Sega CD. Tengen and Sega released the English version of the game overseas in 1993. It is a follow-up to MUSHA for the Sega Genesis. A sequel titled Dennin Aleste 2 (Robo Aleste 2) was planned for the Sega CD on 1993, but was cancelled.

== Gameplay ==
Gameplay screenshot.

Robo Aleste follows the traditional vertically scrolling shooter style, with the player flying forward and enemies coming from the front, sides, and rear. At the end of each level is a boss, which the player must defeat to move on. Each boss is one of the enemy warlords. Like most scrolling shooters, there are several weapons which can be collected and powered up.

The main kunai shot and the three subweapons from Musha Aleste return, joined by new power levels for the main shot and a new subweapon. The sideship system has been completely redesigned: the player is always accompanied by two indestructible units, which also fire subweapons themselves. The ability to give the sideships commands has been replaced with a new subweapon that hits in many different directions. Additionally, the sideships can be launched at enemies.

The Aleste starts out with nothing but the main shot and sideships, and will return to this state whenever the player loses a life. To power up the main weapon, the player must collect small power chips dropped from a certain type of friendly ship. As more chips are collected, the number of knives in a shot increases (up to four), and eventually the Aleste can start firing stronger fireballs instead.

The other weapons are subweapons that each have a particular ability and function separately from the main weapon; only one subweapon can be equipped at a time. To collect, switch between, and power up subweapons, the player must collect one of four colored spheres dropped by another type of friendly ship. Each subweapon has four levels of power, growing stronger and more destructive with each increase in level, obtained by collecting the same subweapon again and again. The four subweapons are:

- The red Bakuryu-housen-ka, or Exploding Flower, releases a large barrage of bomblets, which explode upon impact with the ground or an enemy. Useful for quickly clearing the entire forward screen of foes, as the explosion persists for a short time after impact. This weapon returns from Musha.
- The yellow Hiei-meppu-jin, or Flying Shadow Formation, causes the options that normally fly in front of the craft to circle the Aleste with a protective shield. The options will also actively attack any nearby enemies. It is useful for when enemy craft are coming in from the rear of the screen, and the options can still block bullets in this mode. This weapon returns from Musha, where it was blue.
- The blue Raisen-ha, or Lightning Flash, fires a large blue bolt of electricity at the player's foes. Useful for large enemies (such as bosses) or for when many foes are flying in from the front of the screen, as it deals great damage but with poor horizontal range. This weapon returns from Musha, where it was yellow.
- The green Fuusha-shuriken, or Windmill Throwing-Knife, fires large shuriken in either four or eight different directions, depending on the weapon's powerup level. The stars are flaming at higher levels. Useful for when many enemies are coming in from the front and sides. This weapon is new to Dennin, and as mentioned replaces the ability to give the sideships commands.

== Plot ==
The plot of the game refers to the Sengoku era feudal Japan being given giant mecha. The player takes control of one such mecha, the Aleste, piloted by a man named Kagerou, as he fights other feudal lords.

Kagerou (Shadow) is the sole surviving member of Oda "Demon King" Nobunaga's robot ninja army, the White Fang. The Aleste is an 8-metre tall mechanized steam-powered mech. At the start of the game, Nobunaga's home is razed to the ground by Kurogane, who is a frequent end-of-level boss throughout the game and the older brother of Kagerou. Nobunaga survives, Kagerou defeats Kurogane and resumes his mission to bring down the anti-Oda alliance.

Kurogane is humiliated and refuses to believe that he was defeated by his younger brother Kagerou through skill alone, so he builds himself a gigantic mecha to match the power of the Aleste. He then tests the machine's firepower on a defenseless village, killing all of the innocent villagers caught in the onslaught. Kagerou eventually learns of this and fights Kurogane in a battle to the death. The Aleste, in the end, wins and Kurogane dies.

Kagerou continues his mission and after defeating all of the opposing warlords he comes face-to-face with Astaroth, the leader of the anti-Oda alliance. After defeating Astaroth, Kagerou learns that she has come from another dimension which was supposedly destroyed by Nobunaga, who she believes to be the resurrected figure of Lucifer. Nobunaga plans to take over the world and Kagerou eventually uses the Aleste to stop him once and for all, trapping him in Honnō-ji.

== Release ==
The game was released on November 27, 1992, in Japan for the Mega Drive CD. It was released in North America and Europe in 1993. It was re-released on the Sega Genesis Mini 2 in October 2022.

== Reception ==
Reception

Review scores
Publication	Score
AllGame	3.5/5
Electronic Gaming Monthly	29/40
Famitsu	24/40
GameFan	89.75%
Electronic Games	93%
Mega	52%
MegaTech	92/100
Sega Pro	60%
Sega Zone	70/100

Robo Aleste garnered generally favorable reviews from critics. It also received scores of 19.96 out of 30 and 7.0955 out of 10 in public polls taken by Mega Drive Fan and the Japanese Sega Saturn Magazine respectively. Famitsu's four reviewers found the game to be fun, feeling that it carried the same flow as other Aleste entries, but noted that the game's slow loading times was detrimental to its overall longevity. GameFan's four reviewers regarded it as one of the best shooters of 1993, lauding the visual presentation for making use of the Sega CD's hardware, audio, and fast action. Mega's Neil West commended the animated cutscenes and CD-quality sound, but criticized its gameplay and in-game visuals, questioning its requirement of the Mega-CD add-on. MegaTech's Mark Holmes and Paul Glancey disagreed, giving positive remarks to the detailed graphics, sound, and addictive gameplay, but noted its difficulty and the presentation was seen as basic due to limited options and short level intermissions.

Sega Pro's Dino Boni praised the game's visuals for being well-drawn, use of the Mega-CD's rotation and scaling features, as well as the music and challenge but its gameplay, limited sound effects and lack of continues were seen as negatives. Sega Zone's David McCandless concurred with Boni regarding the soundtrack and commended its playability, but panned its graphical presentation. Electronic Gaming Monthly's four reviewers saw its audiovisual presentation, weapon power-ups, use of the Sega CD's special features and length as positive aspects, but felt that the game's challenge was cheapened due to its "one-hit kills" and difficulty that may alienate fans of MUSHA. GamePro's Scary Larry gave positive remarks to the graphics, sound, controls and overall fun factor. Electronic Games's Bill Kunkel wrote that "Frankly, the Sega CD needed a game like Robo Aleste, with its strong visuals and superior play action, almost as much as Nobunaga." Kunkel also found its retro-futuristic setting as unique.

Retrospective coverage for the game has been equally favorable. GameFan's Eric C. Mylonas highlighted its solid visuals, character designs, soundtrack and feudal Japanese thematic but felt that the title was overshadowed by MUSHA. AllGame Shawn Sackenheim wrote that "Though it may not be the greatest looking Sega CD shooter, Robo Aleste does a great job of keeping the action high, filling the screen with enemies, and keeping everything well animated and believable throughout." Retro Gamer included it on their list of top ten games for the Mega CD, commenting that "the music and cut-scenes genuinely elevate the game to a new level of greatness." Hardcore Gaming 101's Kurt Kalata opined that "the CD medium doesn't add much to the game other than some OK music and some nice scaling effects here and there. Still good, but MUSHA and Spriggan are better.". Sega-16's Ken Horowitz disagreed with Kalata, stating that "There's no real reason why any shmup fan with a Sega CD wouldn't own a copy of Robo Aleste. It's tough and a blast to play, exactly what one would want from any game in the genre."
