= Tombs & Treasure =

1986 video game

- North American NES box art
- Developers: Nihon Falcom; Compile (FC/NES)
- Publishers: Nihon Falcom; Tokyo Shoseki (FC); Infocom (NES)
- Composer: Takahito Abe
- Platforms: PC-8801, PC-9801, FM-7, Sharp X1, MSX2, Famicom/NES
- Release: PC-88: JP: October 1986; NES: JP: August 3, 1988; NA: June 1991
- Genres: Adventure, role-playing
- Mode: Single-player

Tombs & Treasure, known in Japan as Asteka II: Templo del Sol (太陽の神殿: ASTEKA II, Taiyō no Shinden: Asutekā Ni; "Temple of the Sun: Asteka II"), is an adventure game originally developed by Falcom in 1986 for the PC-8801, PC-9801, FM-7, MSX 2 and X1 Japanese computer systems. A NES version, released in 1988, was altered to be more story-based, and features new music and role-playing elements; an English-language NES version was published by Infocom in 1991. Japanese enhanced remakes were released for the Saturn and Windows systems in 1998 and 1999, respectively.

The game takes place in the ancient Mayan city of Chichen Itza on the Yucatán Peninsula. It alternates between using a three-quarters overhead view for travelling from ruin to ruin, and switching to a first-person perspective upon entering a specific location.

== Plot ==
At the start of the game, the player is allowed to name both the protagonist, a young brown-haired man, and the lead female, a green-haired lass who is the daughter of one Professor Imes; if no names are manually entered, the game will randomly choose from a pre-coded list of names for both characters.

Professor Imes is a renowned archaeologist who has been investigating an artifact known as the Sun Key, which potentially has the ability to unlock the greatest secrets of the lost Mayan civilization, and is rumored to be housed somewhere within Chichen Itza. On his latest expedition, he and his team mysteriously disappeared while exploring different temples between June 22 and July 14; only his guide, José, was able to escape unharmed and return with some artifacts that the team found, hoping they will help the player in his quest to find the professor. The three, after talking with the professor's secretary Anne, travel to Mexico and into the ancient city to look for clues.

Several actual sites of Chichen Itza are explored by the player, although their interiors and purposes are purposefully changed slightly in order to help create an atmosphere of fantasy and mystery-solving intrigue. Furthermore, each ruin is home to a demon that is said to be under the control of a creature known only as Tentacula, although this is only speculation that is gathered from the professor's notes and what José has to say to the player at the start.

== Gameplay ==
Tombs & Treasure is predominantly about solving puzzles and interacting objects with one another as they are found throughout the Mayan city. When travelling from temple to temple, the only available action is to walk using the D-pad, but once a temple is entered, the player may start exploring much more thoroughly. Using a list of picture-based action keys ("Go", "Push", "Wash", etc.), the characters can interact with the environment, inspecting it for clues and manipulating it to unlock another area elsewhere. There are several items to collect, as well, whose purpose can be learned by looking at them. The game gives each of the three characters—the boy, the girl, and José—their own special attributes to let them all contribute to the quest. The boy is the player's in-game avatar and usually does the most hands-on work; the girl is talented musically; and José is very strong and able to move things the other two cannot.

The player entering the Ball Court

Some light turn-based combat also faces the player when a demon is encountered inside a ruin. These encounters almost always happen in the very first room of a ruin, although there are some exceptions. Fighting is accomplished, simply enough, using the "Fight" command, although doing this means the player is using his bare hands. Equipping the sword is done before each fight by selecting "Use", and then highlighting the sword in the inventory, first. Battles are strictly turn-based, with no means of healing, and are simply bashing away at the monster until one or the other is dead, but it is possible to run away from the fight with the "Go" command, with the player being fully healed when he comes back to try the battle again later.

The game uses a simplistic experience point system which gives the player additional levels (and hit points) both from winning battles, and from successfully solving puzzles throughout Chichen Itza. As such, the player is kept from advancing too far, or too early, simply because he won't be strong enough yet to contend with the higher-level monsters he's sure to encounter. Occasionally the player may be defeated despite being strong enough. The game also came packaged with a small guide which represented the professor's journal; it is written in an awkward cursive form and can be hard to understand, as well as speaking in riddles, but can often aid the player if read correctly. While there are a few ruins which are strictly for show and cannot be entered, the vast majority can.
