= Aleste =

1988 video game

- Developer: Compile
- Publishers: Sega (MS); CP Communications (MSX2); Square Enix Mobile (JM)
- Director: Masamitsu Niitani
- Designers: Koji Teramoto; Kazunari Komehika
- Programmers: Takayuki Hirono (MSX); Kenji Shintani (MS)
- Artists: Koji Teramoto; Hiromichi Sueyoshi (MS)
- Composers: Masamoto Miyamoto; Takeshi Santo
- Platforms: Master System; MSX2; Java Midlet
- Release: February 29, 1988: Master System; JP: February 29, 1988; NA: December 1988; EU: 1988; MSX2; JP: July 23, 1988; Java Midlet; EU: July 8, 2004
- Genre: Scrolling shooter
- Mode: Single-player

Aleste (アレスタ) is a vertically scrolling shooter developed by Compile, originally published by Sega in 1988 for the Master System and then by CP Communications for the MSX2. The Master System version was released outside Japan as Power Strike. The game spawned the Aleste and Power Strike franchises.

== Plot ==
The story of Aleste concerns the manmade supercomputer DIA 51, which has been infected by a hybrid virus that is spreading like wildfire, eventually leading DIA 51 to eliminate the human race. When Yuri, Ray's girlfriend, gets injured in DIA's assault, Raymond Waizen has all the reason in the world to get rid of DIA 51 once and for all in his Aleste fighter.

== Releases ==
The game was originally released for the Master System in February 1988. This version was released outside Japan, as Power Strike. The US release was initially a mail-only limited edition, however it did later see some retail distribution at Toys R' Us and other chains in North America. The European release was a regular retail package.

An MSX2 version was released in July of that year, featuring two new stages, lowered difficulty, and a series of cutscenes.

A version of the game has been released on phones by Square Enix, presumably based on the MSX2 version. The MSX2 version has been re-released on Nintendo's Wii Virtual Console service in Japan. It along with Aleste 2 had also been rereleased through the now-defunct WOOMB service.

== Reception ==
The Master System version called Power Strike received positive reviews. Computer and Video Games scored it 86% in 1989. Console XS scored it 90% in 1992.

== Aleste series ==
Aleste was followed by several sequels:

- Aleste Gaiden (MSX2, 1989)
- Aleste 2 (MSX2, 1989)
- Musha Aleste (Mega Drive, 1990)
- GG Aleste (Game Gear, 1991)
- Super Aleste (SNES, 1992)
- Dennin Aleste (Mega-CD, 1992)
- GG Aleste II (Game Gear, 1993)
- GG Aleste 3 (Game Gear Micro, 2020)
- Senxin Aleste (Arcade, 2021)
- Aleste Branch (TBA)

=== Cancelled games ===
- Dennin Aleste 2 (Mega-CD, cancelled)

=== Related games ===
There is also a number of similar games, some of which various Aleste entries are based on; for example, Gunhed would inspire Super Aleste on the SNES. Zanac is the game that set down the template for the Aleste series and nearly all of Compile's future shooters. Finally, it is known that around 1993, various employees left Compile and joined Raizing, where they made some similar games.

- Zanac (MSX, FDS, NES, 1986)
- The Guardian Legend (NES, 1988)
- Gunhed (PC Engine, 1989)
- Gun-Nac (NES, 1990)
- Seirei Senshi Spriggan (PC Engine CD, 1991)
- Spriggan Mark 2: Re-Terraform Project (PC Engine CD, 1992)
- Mahou Daisakusen (Arcade, 1993)
- Power Strike II (Master System, 1993)
- Sylphia (PC Engine CD, 1993)
- Spriggan Powered (Super Famicom, 1996)
