= Juggernaut (video game) =

1998 video game

- Developer: Will
- Publishers: JP: Tonkin House; NA: Jaleco
- Platform: PlayStation
- Release: JP: November 19, 1998; NA: September 30, 1999
- Genre: Adventure
- Mode: Single-player

Juggernaut, known in Japan as Juggernaut: Senritsu no Tobira (Note: Japanese: ジャガーノート 戦慄の扉, Hepburn: Jagānōto Senritsu no Tobira; lit. "Juggernaut: The Door to Terror"), is an adventure video game developed by Will and published by Tonkin House for the PlayStation. Jaleco released the game in North America. The gameplay is similar to that of the popular adventure game Myst and features FMV sequences.

== Plot ==
The player controls an unnamed young man whose girlfriend, Sarah, has been possessed by demonic forces. A priest appears to instruct him on how to save her soul. After shedding his mortal body the man enters Sarah's mind, which has taken the shape of a large mansion. He must then collect items, solve puzzles, and utilize different bodies provided in the mansion to unlock the microcosm hub. This leads to other parts of Sarah's soul that must be cleansed. As he nears the final confrontation with the devil, he quickly discovers that there are other, more pressing mysteries about his encounter that need to be solved.

== Gameplay ==
Juggernaut is a first person game that focuses on item collection and puzzle solving. The player can only move along set paths with the compass on the bottom of the screen and interact with objects using the research cursor, which spins when an item can be used. While in the mansion, the player must also utilize several different bodily forms to access all available areas. Machines called ’body converters’ will transfer the player's spirit into either a Juvenile body, which is used to open small doors, or an Adult Body, which is used to open large doors and interact with most objects. While in the soul form, the player can fit through small holes in the mansion but cannot pick up items or open doors.

While the focus is on solving puzzles and riddles, several scenarios occur in which the player must use weapons or dodge attacks within a set time frame. If the player fails to complete the event, he is either sent back to the point right beforehand or sent back to the beginning to complete the scenario again.

There are four microcosm hubs to explore, each with two scenarios to complete. The scenarios are set in either a prison island, a jungle, a forest or cyberspace, and all spread across three discs. Although each hub requires a different disc to play, the order has no effect on the overall game play, giving it a bit of an open world feel.

== Reception ==
Reception

Aggregate score
Aggregator	Score
GameRankings	56%

Review scores
Publication	Score
Electronic Gaming Monthly	7.5/10
Famitsu	30/40
Game Informer	6.5/10
GameSpot	4.4/10
IGN	4.5/10
Next Generation	3/5
Official U.S. PlayStation Magazine	2/5
PlayStation: The Official Magazine	3/5

The game received mixed reviews according to the review aggregation website GameRankings. Adam Pavlacka of NextGen said, "Juggernaut isn't anything new or especially exciting, just a solid entry in the point-and-click genre, with a better puzzle selection and more intriguing story than most." In Japan, Famitsu gave it a score of 30 out of 40.
