= Devil's Crush =

1990 video game

- North American TurboGrafx-16 box art
- Developer: Compile (Note: Ported to Sega Mega Drive by Technosoft)
- Publishers: TurboGrafx-16: JP: Naxat Soft; NA: NEC; Genesis/Mega Drive: JP: Technosoft; NA/PAL: Tengen
- Composers: Masanobu Tsukamoto; Toshiaki Sakoda
- Series: Crush Pinball
- Platforms: TurboGrafx-16, Genesis/Mega Drive
- Release: TurboGrafx-16: JP: July 20, 1990; NA: October 1990; Genesis/Mega Drive: JP: October 10, 1991; NA: July 1992; PAL: September 14, 1992
- Genre: Pinball
- Modes: Single-player, multiplayer

Devil's Crush (Note: Also known as Devil Crash (Japanese: デビルクラッシュ, Hepburn: Debiru Kurasshu) in Japan.) is a pinball video game developed by Compile for the TurboGrafx-16 and released in 1990. The second installment in the Crush Pinball series after Alien Crush, the game has an eerie occult theme with skulls, skeletons, and demons. It was later followed by Jaki Crush and Alien Crush Returns.

The game was ported to the Mega Drive/Genesis as Dragon's Fury (Devil Crash MD in Japan) by developer Technosoft. Both North American TurboGrafx-16 and Genesis versions are censored: all pentagrams have been changed to generic stars, and coffins with crucifixes on them in one bonus stage have been changed to vases. Devil's Crush was later released on the Wii's Virtual Console, with the European release reverting to its original title; however, the pentagram symbols were removed and replaced with an 8-sided star. It also saw release on the Wii U eShop in 2017.

== Gameplay ==
TurboGrafx-16 version screenshot

The playfield of Devil's Crush consists of a free scrolling pinball table three screens high. There are three pairs of flippers. The player can nudge/bump the table to influence the ball's path. Using the tilt button too much will result in the game "tilting" and the flippers will stop working, causing a lost ball. There are many targets to shoot for and hidden bonus rooms.

In the Genesis version, after the player achieves the highest score and beats the table, there is a battle against a final boss and his minions on a much smaller table.

The Genesis / Mega Drive version did not utilize a battery back-up to save high scores.

== Reception ==
Reception

Review scores
| Publication | Score | |
| Publication | Sega Genesis | TurboGrafx-16 |
|---|---|---|
| Computer and Video Games | 93% | N/A |
| Electronic Gaming Monthly | N/A | 5/10, 7/10, 7/10, 8/10 |
| GameSpot | N/A | 7.5/10 |
| Nintendo Life | N/A | 9/10 |
| MegaTech | 91% | N/A |

Award
| Publication | Award |
|---|---|
| MegaTech | Hyper Game |

Devil's Crush has generally been critically applauded. Damien McFerran of Nintendo Life noted the game's audiovisual presentation, stating: "The graphics are really stunning, the designers were obviously smoking something strong when they created this game. The music is also noteworthy, with a brilliant main theme that never gets annoying or repetitive." Frank Provo gave an overall positive review in GameSpot, despite complaints about the pinball physics: "While the ball generally behaves like it's supposed to, it does feel lighter than it should, and it will occasionally ricochet off a wall at an unbelievable angle. Unless you're dead serious about your pinball, though, you'll come to terms with the ball's unique quirks real quick. The intricate table, the flashy visuals, and the surreal setting make it very easy to overlook a few goofy caroms."

The TurboGrafx version reached the top of the Computer & Video Games charts.

In 1997, Electronic Gaming Monthly ranked the TurboGrafx-16 version of Devil's Crush number 50 on its list of the "100 Best Games of All Time", calling it "the best video pinball game of all time—mainly because it didn't try to be anything like real pinball."

== See also ==
- Dragon's Revenge
- Demon's Tilt
