= Alien Crush =

1988 video game

- North American box art
- Developer: Compile
- Publishers: JP: NAXAT Soft; NA: NEC
- Series: Crush Pinball
- Platform: TurboGrafx-16
- Release: JP: September 14, 1988; NA: August 29, 1989
- Genre: Pinball
- Mode: Single-player

Alien Crush is a 1988 pinball video game developed by Compile for the TurboGrafx-16. The game is the first installment in the Crush Pinball series, and was followed by three sequels: Devil's Crush, Jaki Crush, and Alien Crush Returns. Alien Crush was later re-released via emulation on the Virtual Console for Wii, Nintendo 3DS, and Wii U, and for PlayStation 3 through PlayStation Network.

Alien Crush garnered generally favorable reception from critics, some of which reviewed it as an import title; praise was given to the unusual and original graphical design reminiscent of the Alien films, realistic physics, accessibility towards less experienced players and playability but some felt divided regarding its audio, while the transition between the two screens and lack of variety in gameplay aside from the bonus rounds were seen as negative points. Retrospective commentary has been mostly positive.

== Gameplay ==
Alien Crush features a science fiction theme reminiscent of the film Alien. Essentially, the player is "fighting" against the aliens with their pinball skills.

The playfield of Alien Crush consists of two main screens arranged vertically, with a pair of flippers at the bottom of each. The play stops momentarily as the ball shifts from one screen to the next. There are also several hidden/bonus rooms. These hidden rooms mainly involve destroying all the aliens (or several waves of aliens) for bonus points. Should the player achieve the maximum possible score of 10 less than 1 billion, the game ends with the destruction of the table and a congratulatory message.

The player is given the choice of a fast or slow ball speed and two different music tracks.

== Reception ==
Reception

Review scores
Publication	Score
Famitsu	33/40
Game Informer	8.75/10
CVG Mean Machines	90%
The Games Machine	75%
Power Play	73%

Award
Publication	Award
Famitsu (1988)	Gold Hall of Fame

Alien Crush garnered generally favorable reception from critics, some of which reviewed it as an import title. It was given the "Gold Hall of Fame" award from Famitsu and ranked at the number 110 spot with a 22.66 out of 30 score in a public poll taken by PC Engine Fan. Julian Rignall of Computer and Video Games Mean Machines highlighted its graphics reminiscent of the Alien films, atmospheric soundtrack and wide variety of bonus screens, writing that "This stunning pinball simulation is the best yet seen on any machine." Power Play's Martin Gaksch concurred with Rignall, lauding its well-drawn visuals and atmospheric sound design. Gaksch also commended the game's realistic physics and accessibility towards less experience players, but expressed dislike regarding the transition between the two screens. The Games Machine's Warren Lapworth found its graphical design unusual and original when compared to titles such as Captain Blood and Purple Saturn Day. Lapworth commented that the music was competent but forgettable, while noting its lack of variety in gameplay aside from the bonus rounds. TurboPlay's Donn Nauert gave the title positive ratings for its audiovisual presentation and playability.

=== Retrospective coverage ===
Retrospective reviews for Alien Crush have been mostly positive. Nintendo Life's Corbie Dillard praised its addictive gameplay, Alien-themed visuals and audio. IGN's Lucas M. Thomas commended the game's presentation, graphics, audio and engaging gameplay, but noted its limited scope. Nevertheless, Thomas stated that "This Turbo title is an important installment in the industry's pinball genre, and set the bar high for the games to come after it in later years." GameSpot's Aaron Thomas gave positive remarks to its addictive and fun gameplay, catchy music tracks, colorful visuals, interesting table design reminiscent of H.R. Giger's artwork, depth and controls, but the lack of save support for high scores and single table were seen as negative points. In contrast, Eurogamer's Kristan Reed felt that "this is a game that even hardcore pinball nutters will (or should) tire of after a few minutes", criticizing its lack of "neat" ideas and single table restriction. Retro Gamer's Darran Jones wrote that "This wonderfully polished pinball title has a decent main table, solid ball physics and plenty of excellent table features". Hardcore Gaming 101's Kurt Kalata found it to be the most balanced entry in the Crush Pinball, labeling it as a "fun experience to both newcomers as well as experts."

== Sequels ==
Alien Crush was the first game in the Crush Pinball series developed by Compile and distributed by Naxat Soft and later Hudson Soft. A common theme amongst all installments in the series that sets them apart from other pinball games is the presence of sci-fi, fantasy or occult themes.

Devil's Crush was released in 1990 also for the TurboGrafx-16, which featured an occult theme with skulls, skeletons, and demons. Devil's Crush was ported to the Sega Genesis, retitled Dragon's Fury (Devil Crash MD in Japan), by developer Technosoft. A third game was later developed for the Super Famicom called Jaki Crush that contained a Japanese demon/ogre mythology theme, although the game was never released outside Japan.

The series was revived in 2008 when Hudson Soft published a sequel/remake to Alien Crush called Alien Crush Returns for WiiWare.

While Jaki Crush became largely obscure, Alien Crush and Devil's Crush were well received and have both been re-released on the Virtual Console.

Demon's Tilt was released in 2019. The game has been called a spiritual successor to the Crush Pinball series, namely Devil's Crush.

=== Games list ===
- Alien Crush - 1988 - TG16
- Devil's Crush - 1990 - TG16
- Jaki Crush - 1992 - Super Famicom
- Dragon's Revenge - 1993 - Mega Drive (a follow-up to Devil's Crush, developed by Tengen)
- Alien Crush Returns - 2008 - WiiWare (developed by Tamsoft)
