= Power Strike =

Video game series

Power Strike is a series of vertically scrolling shooter video games, developed by Compile for the Master System and Game Gear. It consists of three titles, only one of which was designed from the ground up as a Power Strike title. The other two are Aleste games re-branded for release outside of Japan.

== Power Strike ==
Originally released in Japan in 1988 under the name Aleste, Power Strike is a slightly stripped-down version of the game released for international audiences in the same year. Power Strike contains one less level than Aleste and the anime-styled storyline was removed. In the United States, Power Strike is notable because it was the first mail-order only Master System title. It was also the only title in the Power Strike series to be released in the United States. The US release was initially a mail-only limited edition, however it did later see some retail distribution at Toys R' Us and other American chains. The European release was always a regular retail package.

== Power Strike II (Master System) ==
Power Strike II, released in 1993 in Europe and Brazil for the Master System only, was the only game in the series designed from the ground up as a Power Strike game. It takes place in an alternate past in the 1930s, where players try to capture aerial pirates in retro-futuristic aircraft. The title plays similar to its predecessor, but adds a charged attack by holding the fire button.

== Power Strike II (Game Gear) ==
Power Strike II, released in 1993 in Europe and Brazil for the Game Gear, was originally released in Japan under the name of GG Aleste II: Lance Bird. It is the sequel to GG Aleste rather than a Power Strike title.

== See also ==
- Aleste
