= Casino Games =

1989 video game compilation

- Box art
- Developer: Compile
- Publisher: Sega
- Platform: Master System
- Release: NA: September 1989; EU: November 1989
- Genres: Casino, Pinball
- Mode: Single-player

Casino Games is a video game compilation developed by Compile, published by Sega and released in 1989 for the Master System. The game is a compilation of five games in one cartridge, mainly gambling games.

== Gameplay ==
The compilation contains three card games (including Poker, Blackjack and Baccarat) and two arcade games (including Slot Machine and Pinball), designed to simulate casino games in Las Vegas. The player takes the role of a male/female character with a custom name and starts off with $500 in the casino "Club Sega". The player is able to choose how much to bet in the card games and slot machine and in the case of pinball choose the type of slope for difficulty level. If the player wins a game, a password is outputted to continue progress. If the player runs out of money, the game is over. The player wins if they are able earn $1,000,000.

== Reception ==
Reception

Review scores
Publication	Score
1Up.com	78%
The Games Machine	70%

Scores for the game were mediocre, with Allgame calling it a "Nice collection of games for those who like cards and gambling" and The Games Machine regarding it as well worth the money, while lacking grab and attention.
