= Cycle Race: Road Man =

1988 video game

- Title screen of Cycle Race: Road Man
- Developer(s): Advance Communication Company
- Publisher(s): Tokyo Shoseki
- Composer(s): Michiharu Hasuya
- Platform(s): Family Computer
- Release: JP: December 17, 1988
- Genre(s): Alternative sports (biking); Strategy
- Mode(s): Single-player

Cycle Race: Road Man (サイクルレース ロードマン 激走！！日本一周4000km, Cycle Race Roadman Gekisou!! Nihon Isshu 4000km) is a Family Computer video game based on the sport of road bicycle racing.

== Gameplay ==
=== General gameplay ===
It is the player's ultimate objective to make it all the way around Japan. Players who end up completely damaging the bicycle, running out of energy, or falling behind a certain ranking, will automatically lose the race. Players can choose a representative from either Team USA, Team Japan, Team France, or Team Italy. As long as the player has at least one spare bicycle in the inventory, games will never end on a completely damaged bicycle. Passwords are used to save the game.

The race is 4,000 kilometers long (2485.5 miles). Players must traverse the countryside that separates major Japanese cities along the coastline during the course of these 4,000 kilometres. Interesting scenery includes forests and cattle farms.

Players are always given the exact altitude of each section; they are also shown how far in a stage the player has to advance in order to reach the finish line.

=== Strategy elements ===
The rider is going 66 kilometres per hour (41 miles per hour) and has reached the top ten ranking for that section.

Teammates give out useful power-ups that increase the speed of the bicycle. The power-ups can also give the player the opportunity to make on the spot repairs, and extra energy (i.e., water or energy drink) for those longer courses. Each team has five members to choose from; each with their own strengths and weaknesses and a name that is typical of his nationality. Points (which are used as currency) are earned by finishing as close to first place as possible. Once acquired, points can be used to buy bicycles that are faster and longer lasting. Bicycle sales cannot be cancelled or revoked; discarding a bike is only possible by intentionally destroying them in a race. Bicycles come in different colors including green, red and blue.

There are also technical differences with the different bicycles. Some are better in higher altitude places like mountains while others function better in lower altitude places like valleys and flat land. However, there are also bicycles that can endure both high altitude and low altitude places. Endurance is linked directly to the weight and speed of the bicycle. Longer races require bicycles with a larger endurance rating.
