= Borderline (video game) =

1981 video game

- New Zealand SG-1000 box art
- Developer: Sega (Note: SG-1000 version developed by Compile.)
- Publishers: Arcade: JP: Sega; NA: Sega/Gremlin; EU: Karateco; 2600, SG-1000: WW: Sega
- Platforms: Arcade, Atari 2600, SG-1000
- Release: April 1981: Arcade; JP: April 1981; NA: August 1981; EU: 1981 2600; October 1983 SG-1000; JP: March 1984; EU: 1984
- Genres: Scrolling shooter, maze
- Mode: Single-player
- Arcade system: Dual

Borderline (ボーダーライン, Bōdārain) is a 1981 vertically scrolling shooter maze game developed and published by Sega for Japanese arcades; it was distributed in North America by Sega/Gremlin and in Europe by Karateco. The player controls a jeep and has to destroy enemy refineries. There are four stages with different gameplay. The first stage plays like a vertically scrolling shooter; in the second stage, the player maneuvers the Jeep through underbrush, and enemies can only follow on its path, a concept later found in Namco's Dig Dug (1982).

Borderline was reissued later in 1981 with slightly altered graphics as Star Raker. In 1983, it was converted for the Atari 2600 under the name Thunderground by Sega's home division, making it one of the last games Sega released as a third-party developer for Atari. It was also ported to Sega's own SG-1000 console in 1984. The SG-1000 and 2600 ports received positive reviews from critics.

== Reception ==
E.C. Meade and Jim Clark of Videogaming Illustrated magazine reviewed the Atari 2600 version Thunderground in 1983. Despite the original Borderline predating Dig Dug and Mr. Do! (1982), the reviewers were under the impression that Thunderground was a "semi-clone" of Dig Dug and Mr. Do! Despite this, they gave it positive reviews. Meade gave it an A rating; she said "there are superficial similarities to Dig Dug and Mr. Do" but Thunderground "is a semi-clone with muscle!" She called it "a real challenge" to play, stating "What a game!" Clark gave it a B rating, calling it "a thrilling game" and very "good stuff" but said "the sense of deja-vu detracted from its appeal" while also commenting on its "violence" though he didn't "think anyone will be too bothered."

French magazine Tilt reviewed the SC-3000 version of Borderline in 1984. They gave the game an overall rating of 5 out of 6 stars, while giving 5 stars for the graphics and 4 stars for the sound.

In a retrospective review of the SG-1000 version in 2014, Sega Does gave it a generally favorable review with a B− rating.
