= Compile Maru =

Japanese video game development company

Compile Maru Co., Ltd.
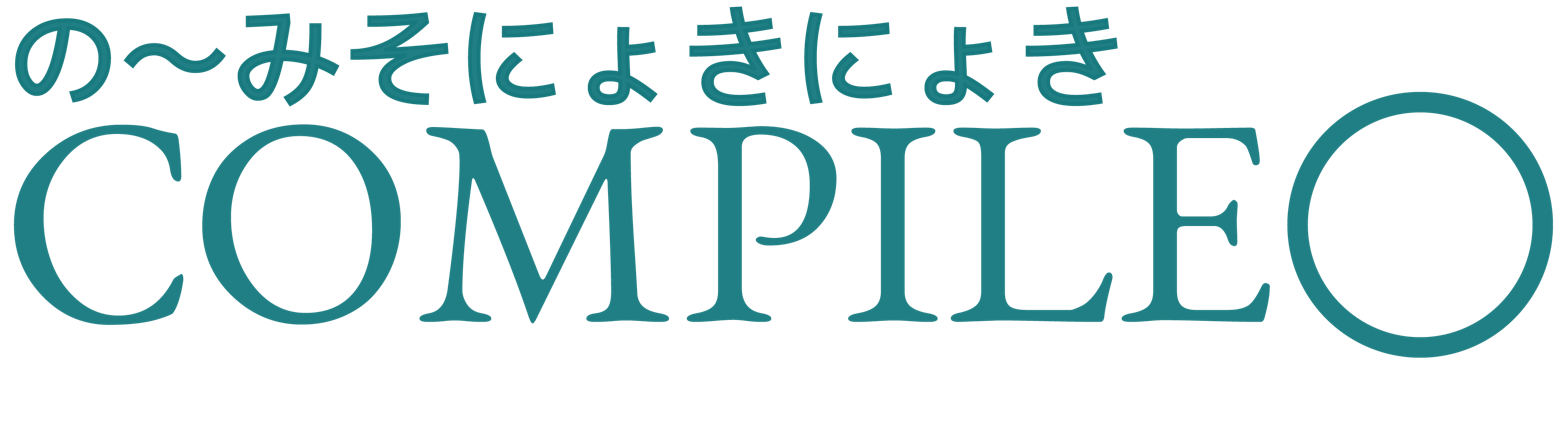
- Formation: April 19, 2016
- Type: Business
- Purpose: Video game development
- Location: Chiba Prefecture (Japan)
- Key people: Masamitsu Niitani (founder and CEO)
- Website: https://www.compile-o.com

Compile Maru Co., Ltd. (株式会社コンパイル丸, Kabushiki gaisha Konpairu Maru; stylized as COMPILE◯, コンパイル〇) is a video game development company founded in 2016 by Masamitsu Niitani (founder of the former company Compile and the creator of Puyo Puyo).

== History ==
Niitani decided to found Compile Maru to publish his new development, Nyoki Nyoki, and as a new venture after the previous company he founded: Compile.

In an interview with Fumio Kurokawa, Niitani talks about the success of Puyo Puyo and how a game potentially on par with Tetris grew the company he founded in 1982. He also mentions that "entrepreneurship is 'but me', and there are no objectives" and "the common people only know tactics", criticizing the big companies and their commercial objectives. He also mentions that "the opportunity to start a business is 'alone or as a company'", which led him to create his own company Compile, spirit that he would maintain throughout his life when he founded Compile Maru and developed Nyoki Nyoki.

== Games ==
- Nyoki Nyoki: Tabidachi Hen for the Nintendo 3DS, based on Pochi and Nyaa
- Dominon X (どみのんX), a falling blocks game with dominoes based on an early Puyo Puyo prototype, published through Project EGG
- Pochi and Nyaa for Windows, based on the unreleased Sega NAOMI version

== See also ==
- Compile, former company founded by Niitani
- Compile Heart, another company founded after Compile's bankruptcy
- D4 Enterprise, the company that holds the majority of the rights to Compile's old IP
