= Ultimate Pinball Quest =

1994 video game

- Developer(s): Interactivision
- Publisher(s): Infogrames; BitWise Software
- Platform(s): Amiga, MS-DOS
- Release: 1994
- Genre(s): Pinball
- Mode(s): Single-player

Ultimate Pinball Quest (also known as The Ultimate Pinball Quest) is a pinball video game for the Amiga developed by Interactivision. It was published by Infogrames in Europe and BitWise Computer Software in the United States in 1994. A version for MS-DOS compatible operating systems was renamed Living Ball.

== Gameplay ==
The game can be played in either normal Arcade or story-driven Adventure modes, and in Bonus mode for the minigame tables.

== Plot ==
In the game's Adventure mode, six elements ensuring the temporal and ecological balance of the planet Calypso have been stolen by three power-hungry magical princesses. A warrior needs to challenge and defeat each of the witches (Wuhan, Omdura and Freila) in their respective domains (the desert, the arctic, and metal wasteland themed tables) in order to find and retrieve the elements and restore the planet.

== Reception ==
The game's Amiga version received generally mediocre or negative reviews.

== See also ==
- Dragon's Revenge
