= A.E. (video game) =

1982 video game

- Developer: Programmers-3
- Publisher: Broderbund
- Designers: Jun Wada; Makoto Horai
- Platforms: Apple II, Atari 8-bit, VIC-20, MSX
- Release: 1982: Apple, Atari; 1983: VIC-20; 1984: MSX
- Genre: Fixed shooter
- Mode: Single-player

A.E. (sometimes shown unpunctuated as AE) is a fixed shooter for the Apple II and Atari 8-bit computers and published by Broderbund in 1982. It was written by Jun Wada and Makoto Horai of Japan-based Programmers-3, a precursor to Compile. Versions followed for the VIC-20 (1983) and MSX (1984). Unlike most earlier shooters which have a solid color or starfield as a background, the action in A.E. takes place in front of science fiction scenes. Attacking creatures emerge from points in the image, often appearing to come from behind objects. Combined with a slight scaling as they advance, there is the impression of depth.

According to the back of the box, "A.E. is the Japanese word for 'ray' as in Manta Ray or Sting Ray", robotic versions of which are enemies in the game.

== Gameplay ==
The player's "missile battery" can be moved left and right along the bottom of the screen. The fire button launches a missile upward which detonates when the button is released.

Chains of creatures swoop in, flying in curves in front of and behind elements of the scene in a 2.5D effect The movement is much like Galaga, but enemies never settle into a formation; they're always moving. The creatures shoot projectiles downward at the player. A missile battery is destroyed if hit by an enemy or an enemy projectile.

== Development ==
Broderbund partnered with Japanese developer Programmers-3 for several games, and A.E. was the first of these. According to Broderbund co-founder Doug Carlston, the Atari 8-bit version of A.E. was the first Atari computer game written in Japan. Programmers-3 became Compile in 1982.

== Reception ==
Arnie Katz wrote for Arcade Express: "The swirling flightpaths of the attackers as they zoom hither and yon around the eight playscreens is the principal feature that distinguishes 'A.E.' from the usual run of invasion games." He pointed out that the images the game is played over have little bearing on gameplay. Citing a satisfying difficulty balance, Katz concluded with a score of 8/10.

InfoWorld's Essential Guide to Atari Computers cited it as "another winner" for Broderbund. Computer Games magazine gave the Atari and Apple versions an "A" in its "1985 Software Buyers Guide." Writing for Videogaming and Computer Gaming Illustrated, Susan Levitan concluded: "A.E. is a highly recommended, very challenging and rewarding game. The 3-D graphics are stunning and the serpentine movement of the A.E. is mesmerizing."
