= Nyoki Nyoki: Tabidachi Hen =

2016 video game

- Developer: Compile Maru
- Publisher: D4 Enterprise
- Platform: Nintendo 3DS
- Release: Nintendo 3DS: JP: November 11, 2016
- Genre: puzzle video game
- Modes: Single-player multiplayer

Nyoki Nyoki: Tabidachi Hen (にょきにょき たびだち編, Nyokinyoki tabidachi-hen) is a puzzle video game developed by Compile Maru and published by D4 Enterprise for the Nintendo 3DS. This is a "fighting puzzle" video game based on 2003 Neo Geo game Pochi and Nyaa, co-produced by Aiky, Taito and SNK, and inspired by Puyo Puyo.

== Gameplay ==
The game consists of two 8x16 grids, one for each player, where the Nyokis fall in pairs, and each player must gather several adjacent Nyokis to clear them from the board, and send nuisance Nyoki to the opponent. The game ends when the Nyoki reach the top of the third column.

Unlike Puyo Puyo, where the mechanics is to gather 4 or more adjacent Puyos of the same color and form chains, the player can accumulate as many adjacent Nyoki as they want and eliminate them when they consider it convenient by converting the falling Nyoki pair into an "activator", forming a chain reaction through the adjacent Nyoki.

== Development ==
Masamitsu Niitani, Compile founder and the creator of Puyo Puyo, founded Compile Maru at 2016, with Nyoki Nyoki: Tabidachi Hen being his first announced project. Niitani's intention was to "eliminate the" complexity of the chains "in conventional puzzles", where "Puzzle beginners are welcome".

During 2017, intentions to launch the video game for the Nintendo Switch were announced. The funds would be collected through a crowdfunding campaign; However the campaign failed to reach the 10-million-yen goal for the port

== See also ==
- Pochi and Nyaa
- Puyo Puyo (series)
