= Space Megaforce =

1992 video game

- North American box art
- Developer: Compile
- Publisher: Toho
- Designer: Takayuki Hirono
- Composers: Keiji Takeuchi; Akiyoshi "Einosuke" Nagao; Katsumi Tanaka
- Series: Aleste
- Platform: Super NES
- Release: JP: April 28, 1992; NA: October 1992; EU: 1992
- Genre: Scrolling shooter
- Mode: Single-player

Space Megaforce, known in Japan and Europe as Super Aleste (スーパーアレスタ, Sūpā Aresuta), is a vertically scrolling shooter developed by Compile. It was published by Toho in 1992 for the Super Nintendo Entertainment System as part of the Aleste series. The player pilots a spacecraft through a variety of locales shooting enemy ships. The story in the Japanese version is different from the American and European one. Super Aleste also offers a "Short Game", with segments of the regular levels; the emphasis is on scoring as many points as possible.

== Plot ==
The story differs slightly depending on which version is played, though the opening premise is always the same.

In the year 2048, a large mechanical sphere falls from space and starts attacking major cities around the world. After much destruction, the sphere hovers over the jungles of South America, drawing lines into the ground similar to the Nazca Line drawings as it expands itself and draws energy from the jungle foliage. Equipped with its own defense system, the sphere destroys all attacks made on it by Earth's military. The original Aleste fighter ship's failure to stop the sphere's growth prompts the construction of a space fighter capable of wielding amazing weaponry, that fighter being the Super Aleste. Tasked with flying into and destroying the sphere, the Super Aleste must also destroy any reinforcements the sphere calls for which come from the deepest depths of space.

In the original Japanese story, the Super Aleste is piloted by an ace named Raz and his co-pilot is a mysterious young alien woman named Thi, a prisoner aboard the sphere who harnesses strange powers freed by the constant attacks against the sphere. Thi's role in the game is to fly with Raz into the sphere, weaken its defenses and properly wrest the sphere's power source. The presence of both characters, and thus the game's original ending, were cut from Space Megaforce and the European version of Super Aleste.

== Gameplay ==
There are eight types of weapons to use, and each can be powered up by collecting chips (small egg-shaped items). Picking up chips causes the player's current weapon to level-up, to a maximum of six. There are two types of chips to find; Orange chips contribute to a level-up, but at higher levels, more chips are required to reach the next level. Green chips make the weapon level up instantly. Each weapon has a function that can be manipulated with the Shot-Control button, changing around the weapon's abilities to suit different situations. Switching to another weapon is done by picking up a numbered item, with initials representing one of the eight weapons.

The player's health is tied to the level of their weapon. When the ship is hit, the weapon loses four levels of power (but it cannot go below 0). If the weapon is already at level 0 upon getting hit, the player dies. This means the weapon must be at level 5 or 6 for the ship to survive two hits. Also, there are two types of extra lives; normally, if the player dies, they try the level again at the last checkpoint. However, it is possible to convert lives into Special Lives with a certain power-up; these allow the player to come back at the exact place they were killed, losing no progress. If the player has enough lives that a number is used to display them, then the icon becomes red if they have at least one Special Life left.

The player's ship cannot be directly harmed by on-screen background structures, but will be crushed if caught between an edge of the screen and an object scrolling towards that edge.

== Version differences ==
The Japanese version has more content than the European and American versions:

- It has super deformed art on the options and game over screen.
- The ending is twice as long and reveals the mystery behind the enemy invasion. More information is revealed upon beating the game on the harder, very hard, and then the hardest difficulty levels.
- The names of the levels and their bosses are different.
- Some voice samples are different.
- Certain Super Aleste music tracks that may have infringed on songs by band New Order were removed from US/EU Space Megaforce. Tracks for the bonus stages (levels 3, 6, 9 and 10) were swapped around, and one track was entirely removed (this track sounds close to several New Order's hit songs, such as "The Perfect Kiss" or "Fine Time").

== Reception ==
Reception

Review scores
Publication	Score
Computer and Video Games	92/100
Electronic Gaming Monthly	8/10, 9/10, 9/10, 9/10
Famitsu	8/10, 8/10, 8/10, 8/10
Game Informer	9/10
GameFan	87%, 94%
Official Nintendo Magazine	92%
Super Play	87%
Total!	(UK) 85% (DE) 1-
Control	70%
Electronic Games	96%
Mean Machines	92%
SNES Force	78%
Super Action	92%
The Super Famicom	74/100
Super Pro	81/100

According to Famitsu, Space Megaforce sold 2,463 copies in its first week on the market and 6,618 copies during its lifetime in Japan. The Japanese publication Micom BASIC Magazine ranked the game fourteenth in popularity in its July 1992 issue, and it received a 21.45/30 score in a 1993 readers' poll conducted by Super Famicom Magazine, ranking among Super Famicom titles at the number 106 spot. It also received generally favorable reviews from critics.

In 1997, Electronic Gaming Monthly ranked it the 46th best console video game of all time, citing its ingenuous power-ups and usage of the Super NES's mode 7 graphical features to present differing level styles.

== Legacy ==
A manga based on the game, written by Kubo Muneo, was published by Monthly ASCII Comic and released on February 22, 1993 in Japan.

== See also ==
- Naoyuki Kato, Super Aleste illustrator
