= Ghostbusters (1990 video game) =

- North American box art
- Developers: Sega; Compile
- Publisher: Sega
- Series: Ghostbusters
- Platform: Sega Genesis
- Release: JP: June 30, 1990; NA: August 1990; PAL: December 1990
- Genres: Platform, shoot 'em up
- Mode: Single-player

Ghostbusters is a 1990 platform shoot 'em up video game developed by Sega and Compile for the Sega Genesis. It features an original story based on the Ghostbusters films, and is unrelated to the 1984 Ghostbusters game by Activision. The game was released in the United States in August 1990, and was released in the United Kingdom later that year. A Brazilian version by Tec Toy was released for the console in 1991.

== Gameplay ==
Ghostbusters is a platform shoot 'em up with side-scrolling gameplay. The game's story involves ghosts terrorizing a city after an earthquake. The game features a choice of three playable Ghostbuster characters from the films: Peter Venkman, Ray Stantz and Egon Spengler. The Ghostbusters each have their own traits relating to speed and shooting strength, and they are each animated with oversized heads meant to resemble their respective actor's likeness. The player can crouch, jump, and is equipped with a positron gun, which can be shot in all directions and is used to eliminate ghosts. The player earns money by eliminating ghosts, and can use the funds to buy upgraded weapons through shops that appear in between levels. Upgraded weapons include a bomb and a gun that emits flames. The player can also purchase a shield that provides temporary invincibility. Money is also used to buy food for health replenishment.

Ghostbusters includes six levels, including four which are set in haunted residential buildings and can be played in any order. The objective of the Ghostbusters is to retrieve pieces of a stone tablet from each of the four initial levels by ridding the areas of ghosts. "Middle ghosts" appear during the middle portion of a level and must be eliminated to progress to the main boss enemy at the end. Middle ghosts include Slimer from the films, while boss enemies include the first film's Stay Puft Marshmallow Man. The player must capture each boss enemy after its defeat. The fifth level, set in a medieval castle, only becomes available upon completion of the other levels, and is followed by a final battle. The game features 22 selectable musical scores, including Ray Parker Jr.'s song "Ghostbusters".

== Reception ==
Reception

Review scores
Publication	Score
ACE	815/1000
Computer and Video Games	82%
Famitsu	6/10, 6/10, 8/10, 5/10
The Games Machine	78%
Mean Machines	80%
Raze	72%
Sega-16	7/10
VideoGame	4/5
Mega Play	33/40

Mean Machines praised the introduction sequence, the graphics, and the variety of options. The magazine concluded that the game was "fairly enjoyable" and that it would likely appeal most to people who enjoy platform games. Julian Boardman of Raze liked the graphics, but criticized the gameplay as repetitive and average.

The Games Machine praised the playable character sprites for resembling their film counterparts, but criticized the simple and repetitive backgrounds. The magazine wrote that it was one of the better platform games available for the Genesis, but considered that it did not capture the spirit of the film. Robert Swan of Computer and Video Games praised the graphics, including the playable character sprites. He also praised the in-game music, but criticized the game's version of Parker's "Ghostbusters" song. Swan considered the game addictive despite its difficulty. Eugene Lacey of ACE praised the design of the game's ghosts, but believed that Parker's song had been rendered better in other Ghostbusters games. Mega Play's four reviewers gave very positive reviews unanimously to the graphics, diverse gameplay, the variety of enemies and the boss fights. One reviewer opined that it was one of the best games made for the Genesis.

In 2004, Ken Horowitz of Sega-16 wrote that it was one of the better movie-licensed games of its time, although he was disappointed by the minimum amount of visual effects, and said that the opening theme music was the major weakness of the game. Horowitz stated that the game had good graphics upon its release, but not as appealing by today's standards.

In 2008, Levi Buchanan of IGN said that the game was "pretty cool" upon its release, especially for Ghostbusters fans, but wrote that it was now something of a mediocre side-scroller, stating that the graphics were still adequate but that the gameplay was "fairly tame compared to what would come later" on the Genesis. Buchanan also questioned the absence of the Ghostbuster character Winston Zeddemore. In 2014, Robert Workman of Shacknews ranked it among the top three best Ghostbusters games. Although Workman believed that there were superior Sega platform games available at the time of its release, he stated that the game had an "innocuous charm to it". In 2016, Luke McKinney of Den of Geek called the game "pretty decent" but ranked it among the weirdest Ghostbusters games, for its "macrocephalic" Ghostbuster characters and its absence of Winston.
