= Senxin Aleste =

- Developer: M2
- Publisher: M2
- Series: Aleste
- Platforms: Arcade, Nintendo Switch, PlayStation 4, PlayStation 5
- Release: Arcade: JP: 15 July 2021; Switch, PS4, PS5: JP: 18 March 2027
- Genre: Shoot 'em up

Senxin Aleste (Note: Japanese: 戦刃アレスタ) is a 2021 shoot 'em up developed and published by M2. Part of the Aleste series, it was released for arcades in Japan on 15 July 2021.

Ports for Nintendo Switch, PlayStation 4 and PlayStation 5 are planned to be released on 18 March 2027.

== Gameplay ==
Senxin Aleste a vertical scrolling shoot 'em up. Players choose one of the four female pilots as a captain: Yuri Kunugi, Ratna Francis, Tanya Yaezakura, and Huang Kexin. Each pilot offers additional perks for the gameplay. Four difficulty levels are available, from Novice, Casual, Original to Expert.

== Development and release ==
Senxin Aleste was developed by M2. It was announced in February 2020. It was released for ALL.Net arcade board on 15 July 2021.

On 15 October 2026, M2 announced it will released Senxin Aleste for Nintendo Switch, PlayStation 4 and PlayStation 5 on 18 March 2027. The home console versions will include both a port of the arcade version, Senxin Aleste Origin, and a newly created version, Senxin Aleste Blade.
