= Pochi and Nyaa =

2003 video game

- Developer: Aiky (Note: Additional work by Compile)
- Publishers: Taito (Note: Co-published and co-distributed with SNK Playmore) (Arcade); Bandai (PS2); Compile Maru (Windows)
- Producer: Masamitsu Niitani
- Designer: Tadayuki Kashima
- Artist: Ichi
- Composers: Daisuke Nagata; Katsumi Tanaka; Kō Hayashi
- Platforms: Arcade, PlayStation 2, Microsoft Windows
- Release: Arcade: WW: 24 December 2003; PlayStation 2: JP: 28 October 2004; Windows: WW: 30 May 2025
- Genre: Puzzle
- Modes: Single-player, multiplayer
- Arcade system: Neo Geo MVS

Pochi and Nyaa (ポチッとにゃ〜, Pochittonya〜) is a puzzle video game developed by Aiky (continuing on from Compile) and released by Taito in 2003 for the Neo Geo. It was one of the last games developed for the platform, as well as the final Neo Geo MVS title developed by a third-party company. In 2004, it was ported to the PlayStation 2 by Bandai, featuring several improvements and new characters.

== Gameplay ==
Arcade version screenshot.

The game is played on a pair of 7x12 grids, where the pieces, called Pochis and Nyaas, fall in pairs, similar to Puyo Puyo. Pieces can be moved and rotated as they fall. Unlike many matching puzzle games, the player can accumulate as many pieces of the same color as they want. A falling piece can be changed into a "trigger", which will clear adjacent pieces of the same color and form a chain reaction. A detonation will send nuisance pieces over to the opponent's grid, with longer chains and branching paths increasing the power of the attack. Like in Puyo Puyo, incoming nuisance pieces can be offset by the defending player triggering a chain in response. A player loses when a piece lands in the top-center square of their grid, represented by a skull. The game has a single-player story mode, a two-player versus mode, and a single-player infinite mode.

== Development ==
Pochi and Nyaa was announced under a commercial alliance between Compile and Taito, and was initially scheduled for release in mid-September 2002, running on the NAOMI arcade board. However, the game was repeatedly delayed due to Compile's bankruptcy until finally being released in December 2003 for the Neo Geo, with then-reformed SNK Playmore helping publish the game. Many characters originally announced for the game did not make it into the final arcade version, but were added as additional characters for the PS2 version.

In November 2005, Aiky's intellectual property, including this game, was transferred to D4 Enterprise.

An unofficial PC port of the cancelled NAOMI version was released by Compile founder Masamitsu Niitani in June 2025.

== Plot ==
In the sky where several gods live, the dog god Pochi and the cat god Nyaa watch over a festival which occurs every thousand years. During this festival, prospective idols compete against one another, and Pochi and Nyaa bet on the best idols to determine which god will be spoiled for the next 1,000 years.

Prim receives an invitation from God promising pumpkin pudding as a reward, so she joins the Pochi and Nyaa festival and competes against various opponents. At the end of the story mode, a giant pudding appears and covers the city.

== Characters ==
Pochi and Nyaa (ポチッ&にゃ〜)
The two rival worshiped gods. Nyaa supports the first player, while Pochi supports the second.

=== Playable characters ===
Primrose "Prim" Amor (プリムローズ・アモル)
The player character in story mode. An novice wizard who lives with her parents and sister in the port city of Solciel.
Liv (リヴ)
A young plant-race girl. She is a spirit of the world tree who has just been born.
Misty (ミスティ)
A user of Ancient Arts, a battle technique which guides magic through dance.
Jurad Tethtith (ジュラード・テスティス)
A strange demon-mage.
Kumada Udon (くまだうどん)
A white bear that is worshiped as a sacred beast and a mountain god in his hometown.
Graber (グラベル)
The spirit of a hero who was active 300 years ago. A character of the same name appears in Madō Monogatari for i-mode mobile phones.
Paradisus (パラディスス)
The older brother of Jurad, a judge who determines the fate of the deceased in the Court of Justice. He has a "book of the past" in which he writes out the past and future of the desired opponent in the trial. The website and manga suggest that Paradisus has an alternate identity as a masked man named "Red Moonlight", which he denies.
Señor Shellhead (ミスターシェルヘッド)
The final boss of the story mode. A mysterious person with a mask.

=== Characters introduced in the PS2 version ===
Eudex (ユーデクス)
The father of Paradisus and Jurad. Former governor of the fifth chamber of the underworld. He passed his role down to his eldest son and lives in retirement.
Punpkie (パンプキー)
A demon who resembles a jack-o'-lantern. Aggressive, impatient and mischievous.
Song-Hua (善花)
A dragon-type girl with an older sister.
Bomby~na (ボンビ〜ナ)
Hidden character. Blue-skin dragon. He is the fiance of Song-Hwa.
Kyle (カイル)
Hidden character. Graber's great-grandson. A handsome hero who uses a gun with a yellow silencer.

== See also ==
- Nyoki Nyoki: Tabidachi Hen, a 3DS game also directed by Masamitsu Niitani with similar mechanics.
