= N-Sub =

1980 video game

- PAL region SG-1000 box art
- Developer: Sega (Note: SG-1000 version developed by Compile.)
- Publishers: Arcade: JP: Sega; NA: Sega/Gremlin; SG-1000; Sega
- Platforms: Arcade, SG-1000
- Release: Arcade: JP: December 1980; NA: 1980; SG-1000: JP: July 15, 1983; PAL: November 1983
- Genre: Fixed shooter
- Modes: Single-player, multiplayer

N-Sub (N-サブ) is a 1980 fixed shooter video game developed and published by Sega for Japanese arcades; in North America, it was distributed by Sega/Gremlin. It was later ported by Compile as a launch game for the SG-1000 in 1983.

== Gameplay ==
The object of the game is to maneuver an on-screen submarine, the "N-Sub," with the joystick and sink the enemy fleet with torpedo fire in the Cobalt Blue Sea. The player can fire torpedoes vertically and horizontally from their submarines by pressing two separate "FIRE" buttons. The player can hold the button longer to fire three torpedoes in rapid succession. Enemy ships attack the N-Sub with missiles, torpedoes and depth charges. A round of gameplay ends when the player defeats a wave of twelve enemy ships. Successive rounds increase in difficulty. The player has multiple lives, or chances to continue after being hit by an enemy ship, and can receive more lives by reaching high scores. The game ends when the player exhausts their lives.

Arcade screenshot
