= Gun-Nac =

1990 video game

- North American box art
- Developer: Compile
- Publishers: JP: Tonkin House; NA: ASCII Corporation
- Designers: Takayuki Hirono; Kouji Mizuta
- Programmers: Takayuki Hirono; Kouji Mizuta
- Artist: Koji Teramoto
- Composer: Toshiaki Sakoda
- Platform: Nintendo Entertainment System
- Release: JP: October 5, 1990; NA: September 1991
- Genre: Scrolling shooter
- Mode: Single-player

Gun-Nac (ガンナック, Gan-Nakku) is a 1990 scrolling shooter video game developed by Compile for the Nintendo Entertainment System. The game was released in Japan by Tonkin House on October 5, 1990 and in North America by ASCII Corporation in September 1991.

== Gameplay ==
The player assumes the role of commander Gun-Nac, and throughout eight different levels, fights a host of enemies from a space ship. The ship can be upgraded to a larger ship by acquiring a "wing", which allows the player to sustain two enemy hits rather than one, and allows the player to upgrade his weapons further than the standard ship would allow.

The game contains five primary weapons, as well as four types of secondary bombs. Examples of primary weapons are a standard gun, a flamethrower and a type of guided boomerang. All weapons have unlimited ammunition, and they are obtained by collecting circles with numbers that correspond to one of the five different weapons. The primary weapons can be upgraded by collecting multiple "Power P's" that float throughout the stage. The secondary bombs work on a similar principle; they are obtained by collecting circles with corresponding letters in them. The bombs, however, are limited in supply to however many the player can collect.

Both the weapons and bombs can be progressively upgraded throughout the game. When a player has acquired a particular type of weapon, he can upgrade weapon level by collecting several of the same circles in a row. Each time another matching circle is collected, the weapon is upgraded. This is limited to five upgrades.

Using the same method, bombs can also be upgraded. When a bomb is upgraded, it becomes twice as powerful, but also consumes twice as much ammunition.

Money can be found randomly floating through the levels, or being released by destroyed objects or enemies; it can be used to purchase upgrades in a shop in between levels.

== Plot ==
In the distant future, the Earth's resources have been depleted, and many of Earth's inhabitants are moving to the new, artificial planetary system called IOTA Synthetica. The planetary system, like all the planetary systems created by the "Galactic Federation", is very hip and up-scale.

This image ended abruptly though, as a mysterious wave of cosmic radiation swept through the planetary system. This radiation caused ordinary inanimate objects to spring to life, and attack the system's residents.

The Galactic Federation, realizing the situation was beyond their control, calls on Commander Gun-Nac, son of the Legendary Xan, (in the original Japanese version, a shrine maiden who summoned the Gun-Nac ship and eventually became its pilot) to save IOTA Synthetica from the ensuing destruction from this strange cosmic energy.

== Development ==
The American release had a number of things removed or changed, such as the first phase of the last boss, the intro and the ending.

== Reception ==
Reception

Review score
Publication	Score
AllGame	4.5/5

AllGame editor Skyler Miller praised Gun-Nac, describing the game as "perhaps the best shooter for the NES".

Famitsu awarded Gun-Nac a score of 26/40.
