= Compile (company) =

Japanese video game developer

Compile Corporation
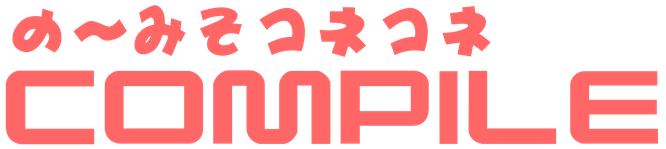
- Logo after being acquired by Compile Heart
- Native name: 株式会社コンパイル
- Romanized name: Kabushikigaisha Konpairu
- Type: Privately held limited company
- Industry: Video games
- Predecessor: Programmers-3, Inc.
- Founded: April 7, 1982
- Founder: Masamitsu Niitani
- Defunct: November 6, 2003
- Fate: Bankruptcy, trademark and intellectual property acquired by Compile Heart and D4 Enterprise, Puyo Puyo franchise acquired by Sega.
- Successor: Compile Heart; Compile Maru
- Headquarters: Japan
- Products: Madō Monogatari; Puyo Puyo

Compile Corporation (株式会社コンパイル, Kabushikigaisha Konpairu) was a Japanese video game developer, most notable for having developed the Puyo Puyo series, a franchise derived from the Madō Monogatari series. On November 6, 2003, the company shut down amid bankruptcy. As a result, key staff moved to Compile Heart, the company's spiritual successor, whereas shoot-'em-up staff moved to MileStone Inc.

The Compile trademark is being used as a brand label by Compile Heart to promote merchandise and games based on Compile properties. As of 2010, Compile Heart entered into a licensing deal with D4 Enterprise to create new video games based on franchises from Compile properties. This agreement does not affect the rights to the Puyo Puyo series as Sega retains ownership of the property.

In April 2016, Niitani started a new successor company to Compile, Compile Maru. The company launched the game Nyoki Nyoki: Tabidachi Hen for Nintendo 3DS on the Nintendo eShop with a follow-up scheduled for Nintendo Switch.

== Puyo Puyo ==
Compile debuted their most successful title, Puyo Puyo, on the MSX computer in 1991. Puyo Puyo is a falling-block puzzle game similar to Tetris (1984). The object of the game is to create groups of four or more "Puyos" of the same color as they fall from the top of the screen. This simple yet addictive concept was expanded on in a series of sequels over the course of two decades.

Puyo Puyo reached North America and the PAL region in graphically altered form under the title of Dr. Robotnik's Mean Bean Machine for the Sega Mega Drive/Genesis, as well as on the Super NES (as Kirby's Avalanche in North America and Kirby's Ghost Trap in the PAL region). However, the series' unaltered appearance was Puyo Pop, a title used for games that were released on the PC Engine, Neo Geo Pocket Color and Game Boy Advance.

As part of Compile's restructuring in 1998, the rights to Puyo Puyo were sold to Sega, but Compile's franchise right would remain until their bankruptcy in 2002, thus allowing Sega to publish Puyo Puyo~n and Puyo Puyo Box. Later Puyo Puyo games were developed by Sonic Team, who created Puyo Pop Fever.

== Guru Logi Champ ==
Guru Logi Champ (ぐるロジチャンプ, Guru Roji Chanpu) is a puzzle game by the Japanese developer released in 2001 for the Game Boy Advance. "Guru Logi" is an abbreviation of "Guruguru Logic", "guruguru" (ぐるぐる) being a Japanese onomatopoeia for a rotating motion. Players control two small yellow birds solving logic puzzles involving placing and removing blocks on the board to create an image. The puzzles have immovable areas that require the player constantly construct and deconstruct their own barriers. The board itself may be rotated so that the player can construct the solution from all four sides. An additional Battle Mode exists in which two players must race to finish puzzles in the fastest time. Battle mode requires a Game Link Cable and only one game pak cartridge. A reworking of the game concept was released by D4 Enterprise for DSiWare under the name Guruguru Logic (ぐるぐるロジック, Guruguru Rojikku), known as Snapdots outside Japan. It was released on December 2, 2009 in Japan and October 18, 2010 in North America. New to Snapdots is the presence of a human-like alien character named Dotty, who acts as player's guide during the tutorial and provides commentary on each puzzle that the players solve. In addition, the game now displays the number of moves it took players to solve each puzzle along with the time, and it also features a Time Attack mode in which players are tasked with solving as many puzzles as they can, chosen randomly, in a specific time frame. The basic rules and gameplay mechanics remain unchanged from Guru Logi Champ, and many of the puzzles in Snapdots were identical to puzzles found in the previous game.

== Shoot 'em ups ==
Until 1993, Compile focused much of their development efforts on the shoot 'em up genre. In the 1990s, a few Compile personnel left the company to work for another video game development company, 8ing/Raizing (est. 1993). There they contributed to such games as Mahou Daisakusen (1993) and Battle Garegga (1996).

Some employees who stayed with Compile until its end reincorporated as MileStone Inc. in April 2003, and continued to develop new shooters.

Some of Compile's shoot-'em-up games include:

=== Zanac ===
First released on the MSX computer in 1986, Zanac combined fast action with an AI system, which changes based on your style of play. Zanac received a true sequel, Zanac EX and an NES port. There was also a parody of Zanac called Gun-Nac, released by Nexoft for the NES in 1991. Similar to Konami's own Parodius games, Gun-Nac brought humor to the gameplay of the original by replacing the enemies with carrot-throwing rabbits and letting the player purchase weapons in a fast food store at the end of each stage. In 2001, Compile released an updated version for the PlayStation titled Zanac X Zanac, which included an original sequel entitled Zanac Neo.

=== Aleste ===
Aleste was released on the MSX2 and ported to the Master System. A sequel, Aleste 2, was also released for the MSX2. Musha Aleste (titled M.U.S.H.A. in the US) was released on the Mega Drive in 1990. The game takes place in a unique Japanese futuristic setting. Super Aleste came out in 1992 for the Super Famicom and was retitled Space Megaforce in North America. Aleste is now available on cellular phones, courtesy of Aiky.

=== Gunhed / Blazing Lazers ===
Gunhed (retitled Blazing Lazers for North America) was released in 1989 and became a showpiece for NEC's PC Engine console.

=== Spriggan ===
Developed jointly by Compile and Naxat Soft under the common label Nazac, Seirei Senshi Spriggan and Spriggan Mark 2 were respectively released in 1991 and 1992 for the PC Engine CD-ROM system.

== Games developed ==
Games marked with a dagger are conversions of a pre-existing version of a game as opposed to being natively developed.

=== As Programmers-3 Inc. ===
Title	Publisher(s)	Platform(s)	Release date	JP	NA	Notes
A.E.	Broderbund	Apple II	1982	No	Yes	
A.E.	Broderbund	Atari 8-bit	1982	No	Yes	
A.E.	Broderbund	C64	1982	No	Yes	
A.E.	Toshiba EMI	PC-88	April 1984	Yes	No	
A.E.	Toshiba EMI	FM-7	May 1984	Yes	No	
A.E.	Toshiba EMI	MSX	1984	Yes	No	
Borderline†	Sega	SG-1000	July 15, 1983	Yes	No	Originally developed by Sega for arcades in 1981.
N-Sub†	Sega	SG-1000	July 15, 1983	Yes	No	Originally developed by Sega for arcades in 1980.
Safari Hunting†	Sega	SG-1000	1983	Yes	No	A port of Tranquilizer Gun, an arcade game by Sega.
Crisis Mountain†	Comptiq	PC-88	August 1984	Yes	No	Originally developed by David Schroeder and Creative Software, published by Synergistic Software for the Apple II, Atari 8-bit, and C64, and released in 1983.
Mr. Robot and His Robot Factory†	Comptiq	PC-88	August 1984	Yes	No	Originally published by Datamost for the Atari 8-bit, Apple II, C64.
The Heist†	Comptiq	PC-88	August 1984	Yes	No	Originally published by Micro Fun for the Apple II in 1983.
Hustle Chumy	General	MSX	1984	Yes	No	
Hustle Chumy	Sega	SG-1000	1984	Yes	No	
Lode Runner†	Sony	MSX	1984	Yes	No	Originally developed for the Apple II, Atari 8-bit, VIC-20, C64, and IBM PC. They were published by Broderbund in 1983.
E.I. - Exa Innova	Sony	MSX	1984	Yes	No	

=== As Compile ===
Title	Publisher(s)	Platform(s)	Release date	JP	NA	PAL	Notes
Lunar Ball	Pony Canyon	PC-88	June 1985	Yes	No	No	
Lunar Ball	Pony Canyon	NES	December 5, 1985	Yes	Yes	Yes	This version was published by FCI in North America in October 1987 and in Europe in 1991.
Championship Lode Runner†	ASCII	MSX	1985	Yes	No	No	This game was originally published by Broderbund for the Apple II in 1983.
Championship Lode Runner†	Sega	SG-1000	1985	Yes	No	No	This game was originally published by Broderbund for the Apple II in 1983.
Final Justice	Pony Canyon	MSX	1985	Yes	No	No	
Lode Runner II	Sony	MSX	1985	Yes	No	No	The license to the Lode Runner series was from Broderbund.
Swing	Pony Canyon	MSX	1985	Yes	No	No	
Choplifter†	ASCII	MSX	1985	Yes	No	No	This game was originally published by Broderbund for the Apple II in May 1982.
Choplifter†	Sega	SG-1000	1985	Yes	No	No	This game was originally published by Broderbund for the Apple II in May 1982.
C-So!	Pony Canyon	MSX	1985	Yes	No	No	
C-So!	Sega	SG-1000	1985	Yes	No	No	This version was a port of the MSX version.
Zanac	Pony Canyon	MSX	July 25, 1986	Yes	No	No	
Zanac	Pony Canyon	Famicom Disk System	November 28, 1986	Yes	No	No	FCI published an NES conversion in North America in October 1987.
Zanac	Compile	Palm OS	October 24, 2001	Yes	No	No	
Thexder†	Game Arts	MSX	July 1986	Yes	No	No	The game was originally developed and released by Game Arts for the PC-8801mkII SR in April 1985.
Gulkave	Pony Canyon	MSX	1986	Yes	No	No	
Gulkave	Sega	SG-1000	1986	Yes	No	No	
Guardic	Compile	MSX	1986	Yes	No	No	
Champion Billiards	Sega	SG-1000	1986	Yes	No	No	
Zanac EX†	Pony Canyon	MSX2	January 1987	Yes	No	No	
City Adventure Touch: Mystery of Triangle	Toho	NES	March 14, 1987	Yes	No	No	
Ghostbusters†	Sega	Master System	May 1987	No	Yes	Yes	This game is based on the 1984 film of the same name.
Romancia: Dragon Slayer Jr.†	Tokyo Shoseki	NES	October 30, 1987	Yes	No	No	This game was originally developed, published, and released by Nihon Falcom for the PC-8801 in 1986.
Parlour Games	Sega	Master System	December 27, 1987	Yes	Yes	Yes	
Golvellius	Compile	MSX	1987	Yes	No	No	
Golvellius	Sega	Master System	August 14, 1988	Yes	Yes	Yes	
Higemaru Makaijima - Nanatsu no Shima Daibōken	Capcom	MSX2	1987	Yes	No	No	
Jagur-5: Golden Triangle	Hudson Soft	MSX	1987	Yes	No	No	
The Guardian Legend	Irem	NES	February 5, 1988	Yes	Yes	Yes	This game was published and released in North America by Broderbund in April 1989.
Aleste	Sega	Master System	February 29, 1988	Yes	Yes	Yes	
Aleste	Compile	MSX	July 23, 1988	Yes	No	No	
Disc Station #0	Compile	MSX	July 1988	Yes	No	No	
Tombs & Treasure	Tokyo Shoseki	NES	August 3, 1988	Yes	Yes	Yes	This game was originally developed, published, and released by Nihon Falcom for the PC-8801 in October 1986. This game was also published and released in North America by Infocom in June 1991.
Alien Crush	Naxat Soft	TurboGrafx-16	September 14, 1988	Yes	Yes	No	This game was published in North America by NEC on August 29, 1989.
R-Type†	Sega	Master System	October 1, 1988	Yes	Yes	Yes	This game was originally developed, published and released by Irem in Arcades in July 1987.
Disc Station #1	Compile	MSX	October 8, 1988	Yes	No	No	
Godzilla: Monster of Monsters!	Toho	NES	December 9, 1988	Yes	Yes	Yes	This game is based on the Godzilla movies.
Xevious: Fardraut Saga	Namco	MSX	December 23, 1988	Yes	No	No	
Xevious: Fardraut Saga	Namco	TurboGrafx-16	June 29, 1990	Yes	No	No	
Disc Station #2	Compile	MSX	1988	Yes	No	No	
Randar no Bouken	Kemsx	MSX	1988	Yes	No	No	
Disc Station Special: Spring Edition	Compile	MSX	March 8, 1989	Yes	No	No	
Disc Station Special: Summer Edition	Compile	MSX	May 1, 1989	Yes	No	No	
Blazing Lazers	Hudson Soft	TurboGrafx-16	July 7, 1989	Yes	Yes	No	This game is based on the Gunhed movie. This game was also published in North America by NEC on August 29, 1989.
Disc Station Special: Autumn Edition	Compile	MSX	September 8, 1989	Yes	No	No	
Casino Games	Sega	Master System	September 1989	No	Yes	Yes	
Disc Station Special: Christmas Edition	Compile	MSX	December 10, 1989	Yes	No	No	Madou Monogatari Episode II: Carbuncle is bundled in the game.
Aleste Gaiden	Compile	MSX	1989	Yes	No	No	
Aleste 2	Compile	MSX	1989	Yes	No	No	
Rune Master	Compile	MSX	1989	Yes	No	No	
Randar II: Revenge of Death	Compile	MSX	1989	Yes	No	No	
Disc Station #3	Compile	MSX	1989	Yes	No	No	
Disc Station #4	Compile	MSX	1989	Yes	No	No	
Disc Station #5	Compile	MSX	1989	Yes	No	No	
Disc Station #6	Compile	MSX	1989	Yes	No	No	
Disc Station #7	Compile	MSX	1989	Yes	No	No	
Disc Station #8	Compile	MSX	January 1990	Yes	No	No	
Disc Station #9	Compile	MSX	February 1990	Yes	No	No	
Disc Station #10	Compile	MSX	March 1990	Yes	No	No	
Disc Station #11	Compile	MSX	April 1990	Yes	No	No	
Disc Station #12	Compile	MSX	May 1990	Yes	No	No	
Madō Monogatari 1-2-3	Compile	MSX	June 15, 1990	Yes	No	No	
Madō Monogatari 1-2-3	Compile	PC-8801	November 23, 1991	Yes	No	No	
Madō Monogatari 1-2-3	Sega	Game Gear	December 3, 1993	Yes	No	No	This version is a remake of the first part of 1-2-3. It was re-titled Madō Monogatari I: Mittsu no Madō-kyū.
Madō Monogatari 1-2-3	Sega	Game Gear	May 20, 1994	Yes	No	No	This version is a remake of the second part of 1-2-3. It was re-titled Madō Monogatari II: Arle 16-Sai.
Madō Monogatari 1-2-3	Sega	Game Gear	December 30, 1994	Yes	No	No	This version is a remake of the third part of 1-2-3. It was re-titled Madō Monogatari III: Kyūkyoku Joō-sama.
Madō Monogatari 1-2-3	Compile	Sega Genesis	March 22, 1996	Yes	No	No	This version is a remake of the first part of 1-2-3. It was re-titled Madō Monogatari I.
Madō Monogatari 1-2-3	Compile	PC Engine CD-ROM²	December 13, 1996	Yes	No	No	This version is a remake of the first part of 1-2-3. It was re-titled Madō Monogatari I: Honoo No Sotsuenji.
Ghostbusters	Sega	Sega Genesis	June 30, 1990	Yes	Yes	Yes	This game is based on the Ghostbusters franchise.
Disc Station #13	Compile	MSX	June 1990	Yes	No	No	
Devil's Crush	Naxat Soft	TurboGrafx-16	July 20, 1990	Yes	Yes	No	This game was published in North America by NEC in 1990.
Disc Station #14	Compile	MSX	July 1990	Yes	No	No	
Disc Station #15	Compile	MSX	August 1990	Yes	No	No	
Disc Station #16	Compile	MSX	September 1990	Yes	No	No	
Gun-Nac	Tonkin House	NES	October 5, 1990	Yes	Yes	No	This game was published in North America by ASCII in September 1991.
Cyber Knight	Tonkin House	TurboGrafx-16	October 12, 1990	Yes	No	No	
Godzilla	Toho	Game Boy	October 1990	Yes	Yes	Yes	
Disc Station #17	Compile	MSX	October 1990	Yes	No	No	
Disc Station #18	Compile	MSX	November 1990	Yes	No	No	
M.U.S.H.A.	Toaplan	Sega Genesis	December 21, 1990	Yes	Yes	No	This game was published in North America by Seismic in 1991.
Columns†	Telenet Japan	MSX	December 25, 1990	Yes	No	No	This game was originally developed by Jay Geertson and ported across various computer platforms.
Disc Station #19	Compile	MSX	December 1990	Yes	No	No	
Rune Master II	Compile	MSX	1990	Yes	No	No	
Randar no Bouken III: Yami ni Miserareta Majutsushi	Compile	MSX	1990	Yes	No	No	
Disc Station #20	Compile	MSX	January 1991	Yes	No	No	
Disc Station #21	Compile	MSX	February 1991	Yes	No	No	
Disc Station #22	Compile	MSX	March 1991	Yes	No	No	
Gorby no Pipeline Daisakusen	Compile	FM Towns	April 12, 1991	Yes	No	No	
Gorby no Pipeline Daisakusen	Compile	MSX	April 12, 1991	Yes	No	No	
Gorby no Pipeline Daisakusen	Tokuma Shoten	NES	April 12, 1991	Yes	No	No	
Disc Station #23	Compile	MSX	April 1991	Yes	No	No	
Disc Station #24	Compile	MSX	May 1991	Yes	No	No	
Disc Station #25	Compile	MSX	June 1991	Yes	No	No	
Seirei Senshi Spriggan	Naxat Soft	PC Engine CD-ROM²	July 12, 1991	Yes	No	No	
Disc Station #26	Compile	MSX	July 1991	Yes	No	No	
Disc Station #27	Compile	MSX	August 1991	Yes	No	No	
Disc Station #28	Compile	MSX	September 1991	Yes	No	No	
Puyo Puyo	Compile	MSX	October 25, 1991	Yes	No	No	
Puyo Puyo	Tokuma Shoten	Famicom Disk System	October 25, 1991	Yes	No	No	
Puyo Puyo	Tokuma Shoten	NES	July 23, 1993	Yes	No	No	
Disc Station #29	Compile	MSX	October 1991	Yes	No	No	
Disc Station #30	Compile	MSX	November 1991	Yes	No	No	
GG Aleste	Compile	Game Gear	December 29, 1991	Yes	No	No	
Disc Station #31	Compile	MSX	December 1991	Yes	No	No	
The Laughing Salesman	Compile	MSX2	1991	Yes	No	No	This game is based on Fujiko Fujio A's The Laughing Salesman.
The Laughing Salesman	Compile	PC-9801	1991	Yes	No	No	This game is based on Fujiko Fujio A's The Laughing Salesman.
Dragon Quiz	Compile	MSX	1991	Yes	No	No	
Rune Master: War among Three Empires	Compile	MSX	1991	Yes	No	No	
Disc Station #32	Compile	MSX	January 1992	Yes	No	No	
Super Aleste	Toho	Super NES	April 28, 1992	Yes	Yes	Yes	
Spriggan Mark 2	Naxat Soft	PC Engine Super CD-ROM²	May 1, 1992	Yes	No	No	
Shiki Oni no Koku: Chūgokuhen – Daiisshō	Compile	PC-98	July 22, 1992	Yes	No	No	
Shiki Oni no Koku: Chūgokuhen – Dainishō	Compile	PC-98	August 29, 1992	Yes	No	No	
Shiki Oni no Koku: Chūgokuhen – Daisanshō	Compile	PC-98	September 18, 1992	Yes	No	No	
Shiki Oni no Koku: Chūgokuhen – Daiyonshō	Compile	PC-98	October 20, 1992	Yes	No	No	
Puyo Puyo	Sega	Arcade	October 1992	Yes	Yes	Yes	
Puyo Puyo	Sega	Sega Genesis	December 18, 1992	Yes	Yes	Yes	This version was remade and re-released in some other countries as Dr. Robotnik's Mean Bean Machine by Sega on November 26, 1993.
Puyo Puyo	Sega	Game Gear	March 19, 1993	Yes	Yes	Yes	This version was remade and re-released in some other countries as Dr. Robotnik's Mean Bean Machine by Sega in December 1993.
Puyo Puyo	Compile	PC-98	March 19, 1993	Yes	No	No	
Puyo Puyo	Banpresto	Super NES	December 10, 1993	Yes	Yes	Yes	Released as Super Puyo Puyo. This version was also remade and re-released in some other countries as Kirby's Avalanche by Nintendo on February 1, 1995.
Puyo Puyo	SPS	X68000	March 25, 1994	Yes	No	No	
Puyo Puyo	Banpresto	Game Boy	July 25, 1994	Yes	No	No	This version was co-developed by Winkysoft.
Puyo Puyo	Bothtec	PC-98	May 28, 1995	Yes	No	No	Released as Puyo Puyo for Windows.
Puyo Puyo	Bothtec	Microsoft Windows	August 2, 1996	Yes	No	No	Released as Puyo Puyo for Windows 95.
Puyo Puyo	Bothtec	Macintosh	December 28, 1996	Yes	No	No	
Robo Aleste	Compile	Sega CD	November 27, 1992	Yes	Yes	Yes	The game was published and released in North America by Tengen in 1993.
Jaki Crush	Naxat Soft	Super NES	December 18, 1992	Yes	No	No	
Disc Saga: Iraisha wa Monster?	Compile	PC-98	1992	Yes	No	No	
Disc Saga: Yukemuri ni Kieta Bijotachi Yume no Naka e Rendezvous	Compile	PC-98	1992	Yes	No	No	
Disc Saga: Nagisa no Baka Taishō	Compile	PC-98	1992	Yes	No	No	
Nazo Puyo	Sega	Game Gear	July 23, 1993	Yes	No	No	
The Laughing Salesman	Sega	Sega CD	September 17, 1993	Yes	No	No	This game is based on Fujiko Fujio A's The Laughing Salesman.
Power Strike II	Sega	Master System	September 1993	No	No	Yes	
GG Aleste II	Sega	Game Gear	October 1, 1993	Yes	No	Yes	
Disc Station Vol. 1	Compile	PC-98	October 6, 1993	Yes	No	No	
Sylphia	Tonkin House	PC Engine Super CD-ROM²	October 22, 1993	Yes	No	No	
Madou Monogatari A.R.S	Compile	PC-98	December 10, 1993	Yes	No	No	
Madou Monogatari A.R.S	Compile	Game Gear	November 24, 1995	Yes	No	No	This version is a remake of the first part of A.R.S. It was re-released as Madō Monogatari A: Dokidoki Vacation.
Nazo Puyo 2	Sega	Game Gear	December 10, 1993	Yes	No	No	
Disc Station Vol. 2	Compile	PC-98	January 13, 1994	Yes	No	No	
Disc Station Vol. 3	Compile	PC-98	July 15, 1994	Yes	No	No	Contains Madō Monogatari: Michikusa Ibun.
Nazo Puyo: Arle no Roux	Sega	Game Gear	July 29, 1994	Yes	No	No	
Puyo Puyo Tsu	Compile	Arcade	September 1994	Yes	No	No	
Puyo Puyo Tsu	Compile	Sega Genesis	December 2, 1994	Yes	No	No	
Puyo Puyo Tsu	Compile	Game Gear	December 16, 1994	Yes	No	No	
Puyo Puyo Tsu	Compile	PC-9801	October 27, 1995	Yes	No	No	
Puyo Puyo Tsu	Compile	Sega Saturn	October 27, 1995	Yes	No	No	This version was co-developed by Bits Laboratory.
Puyo Puyo Tsu	Compile	Super NES	December 8, 1995	Yes	No	No	Released as Super Puyo Puyo Tsu.
Puyo Puyo Tsu	Compile	PC Engine CD-ROM²	March 29, 1996	Yes	No	No	This version was co-developed by Goo! and released as Puyo Puyo CD Tsu.
Puyo Puyo Tsu	Compile	Windows 95	November 15, 1996	Yes	No	No	
Puyo Puyo Tsu	Compile	PlayStation	November 15, 1996	Yes	No	No	Released as Puyo Puyo Tsu Ketteiban.
Puyo Puyo Tsu	Compile	Game Boy	December 13, 1996	Yes	No	No	
Puyo Puyo Tsu	Bandai	WonderSwan	March 11, 1999	Yes	No	No	Sega had ownership of Puyo Puyo at the time of this port.
Puyo Puyo Tsu	SNK	Neo Geo Pocket Color	July 22, 1999	Yes	Yes	Yes	Sega had ownership of Puyo Puyo at the time of this port.
Disc Station Vol. 4	Compile	PC-98	October 7, 1994	Yes	No	No	Contains Gensei Fūkyō Den.
Nazo Puyo	Compile	PC-98	November 11, 1994	Yes	No	No	
Gensei Kitan: Disc Saga III	Compile	PC-98	January 4, 1995	Yes	No	No	
Disc Station Vol. 5	Compile	PC-98	January 9, 1995	Yes	No	No	
Gensei Kitan	Compile	PC-98	April 1, 1995	Yes	No	No	
Disc Station Vol. 6	Compile	PC-98	April 7, 1995	Yes	No	No	
Super Nazo Puyo: Rulue no Roux	Banpresto	Super NES	May 26, 1995	Yes	No	No	
Disc Station Vol. 7	Compile	PC-98	July 7, 1995	Yes	No	No	Contains Wind's Seed.
Disc Station Vol. 8	Compile	PC-98	October 6, 1995	Yes	No	No	
Disc Station Vol. 9	Compile	PC-98	January 9, 1996	Yes	No	No	
Madō Monogatari: Hanamaru Daiyōchienji	Tokuma Shoten	Super NES	January 12, 1996	Yes	No	No	
Shadowrun	Compile	Sega CD	February 23, 1996	Yes	No	No	
Disc Station Vol. 10	Compile	PC-98	April 5, 1996	Yes	No	No	Contains Rude Breaker.
Super Nazo Puyo 2: Rulue no Tetsuwan Hanjouki	Compile	Super NES	June 26, 1996	Yes	No	No	
Disc Station Vol. 11	Compile	PC-98	July 5, 1996	Yes	No	No	
Disc Station Vol. 12	Compile	Microsoft Windows	September 6, 1996	Yes	No	No	
Puyo Puyo Sun	Compile	Arcade	December 1996	Yes	No	No	
Puyo Puyo Sun	Compile	Sega Saturn	February 14, 1997	Yes	No	No	
Puyo Puyo Sun	Compile	Nintendo 64	October 31, 1997	Yes	No	No	
Puyo Puyo Sun	Compile	PlayStation	November 27, 1997	Yes	No	No	Released as Puyo Puyo Sun Ketteiban.
Puyo Puyo Sun	Compile	Microsoft Windows	April 17, 1998	Yes	No	No	
Puyo Puyo Sun	Compile	Game Boy Color	November 27, 1998	Yes	No	No	Sega had ownership of Puyo Puyo at the time of this port.
Disc Station Vol. 13	Compile	Microsoft Windows	December 6, 1996	Yes	No	No	
Disc Station Vol. 14	Compile	Microsoft Windows	March 6, 1997	Yes	No	No	
Disc Station Vol. 15	Compile	Microsoft Windows	June 6, 1997	Yes	No	No	Contains Tales of the Float Land.
Disc Station Vol. 16	Compile	Microsoft Windows	September 6, 1997	Yes	No	No	
DiscStation Bessatsu i miss you.	Compile	Sega Saturn	October 30, 1997	Yes	No	No	
Disc Station Vol. 17	Compile	Microsoft Windows	December 6, 1997	Yes	No	No	
Disc Station Vol. 18	Compile	Microsoft Windows	March 6, 1998	Yes	No	No	
Waku Waku Puyo Puyo Dungeon	Compile	Sega Saturn	April 2, 1998	Yes	No	No	
Waku Waku Puyo Puyo Dungeon	Compile	PlayStation	March 8, 1999	Yes	No	No	Released as Waku Waku Puyo Puyo Dungeon Ketteiban. Sega had ownership of Puyo Puyo at the time of this port.
Disc Station Vol. 19	Compile	Microsoft Windows	July 6, 1998	Yes	No	No	Contains Mystic Arts.
Madou Monogatari	Compile	Sega Saturn	July 23, 1998	Yes	No	No	This is the first game to acknowledge Sega's ownership of the Puyo Puyo characters.
Disc Station Vol. 20	Compile	Microsoft Windows	September 6, 1998	Yes	No	No	Contains Comet Summoner.
Disc Station Vol. 21	Compile	Microsoft Windows	December 6, 1998	Yes	No	No	
Puyo Puyo~n	Sega	Dreamcast	March 4, 1999	Yes	No	No	
Puyo Puyo~n	Compile	Nintendo 64	December 3, 1999	Yes	No	No	
Puyo Puyo~n	Compile	PlayStation	December 16, 1999	Yes	No	No	
Puyo Puyo~n	Compile	Game Boy Color	September 22, 2000	Yes	No	No	
Disc Station Vol. 22	Compile	Microsoft Windows	March 6, 1999	Yes	No	No	
Disc Station Vol. 23	Compile	Microsoft Windows	June 6, 1999	Yes	No	No	
Puyo Puyo Gaiden: Puyo Wars	Compile	Game Boy Color	August 27, 1999	Yes	No	No	
Disc Station Vol. 24	Compile	Microsoft Windows	September 6, 1999	Yes	No	No	
Disc Station Vol. 25	Compile	Microsoft Windows	December 6, 1999	Yes	No	No	
Puyo Puyo Da!	Compile	Dreamcast	December 16, 1999	Yes	No	No	
Puyo Puyo Da!	Compile	Arcade	December 26, 1999	Yes	No	No	
Disc Station Vol. 26	Compile	Microsoft Windows	March 6, 2000	Yes	No	No	
Arle no Bouken: Mahou no Jewel	Compile	Game Boy Color	March 31, 2000	Yes	No	No	
Disc Station Vol. 27	Compile	Microsoft Windows	June 6, 2000	Yes	No	No	
Wander Wonder	Compile	Microsoft Windows	October 13, 2000	Yes	No	No	
Puyo Puyo Box	Compile	PlayStation	December 21, 2000	Yes	No	No	
Zanac X Zanac	Compile	PlayStation	November 29, 2001	Yes	No	No	
Guru Logi Champ	Compile	Game Boy Advance	November 29, 2001	Yes	No	No	
Pochi and Nyaa	Taito	Arcade	December 24, 2003	Yes	No	No	Aiky took over development, co-published with SNK Playmore.
