= Super Tennis =

1991 video game

- North American cover art
- Developer: Tose
- Publishers: JP: Tonkin House; NA/EU: Nintendo; BRA: Playtronic
- Director: Ma-chu
- Producers: Ikurō Urai; Phil Sandhop
- Designers: Chiemi Haruki; Katsuhiko Motono; Mika Inoue
- Artist: S. Waki
- Writer: Yuka Nakata
- Composer: Yoshiki Nishimura
- Platform: Super Nintendo Entertainment System
- Release: JP: August 30, 1991; NA: November 1991; EU: April 11, 1992; BRA: August 30, 1993
- Genre: Sports (tennis)
- Modes: Single-player, multiplayer

Super Tennis (Note: Also known as Super Tennis World Circuit (Japanese: スーパーテニス ワールドサーキット, Hepburn: Sūpā Senisu Wārudo Sākitto) in Japan) is a 1991 tennis video game developed by Tose and published by Tonkin House for the Super Nintendo Entertainment System. Nintendo localized the game and released it outside Japan. It utilizes mode 7 graphics.

== Gameplay ==
Gameplay screenshot

The game itself features three different modes: Doubles mode, World Circuit mode, and Singles mode, in which the player competes against a human or chosen computer opponent. In doubles mode, the player and a human teammate can face the CPU. Said-players can each pair with a CPU opponent, or one player can pair with a CPU opponent to face two other computer opponents. Circuit mode is the most unlike the other modes and featuring a wide range of sequential tours the player can choose to battle through each to earn ranking points, with aim to finish number one in the rankings. There are four minor tournaments and four major tournaments, each taking place on one of three surfaces that each have different effects on how the ball bounces; the tournaments are based on real-life counterparts and include nearly every world tournament in existence at that current time.

All tennis players, whether playable or the opponents, are cute, short representations of the then-top world players, though their last names are left out of the game. Each playable tennis player has their own talents on the court. Multiple of the right-hand buttons of the SNES controller perform different tennis racket moves and the direction of the ball when hit is influenced by the control pad, which also moves the player around their side of the tennis court in anticipation of the ball. Super Tennis takes time to master, as the game itself neither tells the player how to play, nor gives them any knowledge on how the many different playable characters subtly differ in play style.

== Reception ==
Reception

Review scores
Publication	Score
ACE	920/1000
Computer and Video Games	96%
Famitsu	5/10, 6/10, 6/10, 5/10
Game Informer	7.25/10
Game Players	9/10
Games-X	4.5/5
Super Play	92%
Total!	96%
Control	83%, 91%
Cubed3	9/10
Game Zone	90/100
Hippon Super!	9/10
Mean Machines	93%
N-Force	92%
SNES Force	88%
Super Action	5/5
The Super Famicom	B
Super Gamer	91%
Super Pro	91/100

According to Famitsu, Super Tennis sold 7,095 copies in its first week on the market and 27,930 copies during its lifetime in Japan. The Japanese publication Micom BASIC Magazine ranked the game ninth in popularity in its November 1991 issue. It also received acclaim from critics.

Mean Machines magazine declared it to be "the best tennis game available [as of October 1991]" and scored all aspects of the game very highly, from sound, to gameplay, to their impressions overall. They were impressed by the attention to detail, like how ball runners get the ball off of the court whenever it gets caught in the net. Computer and Video Games' editors said that Super Tennis is "more fun than should be allowed" when a set is played against a friend. They also echoed the declaration that this was the best tennis game available up until that point. Professional film critics Siskel and Ebert featured the game in a brief segment to end a "Holiday Video Gift Guide" special which was syndicated on television in the United States in December 1991. Gene Siskel praised its realism and claimed it was his "favorite video game".

In a 2000s retrospective, Mean Machines' then-editor Damo stated that the game was still "the best representation of the sport to date" and also the most "fantastically competitive", but also said the single player was "nothing special". Super Tennis was included as one of the titles in the 2010 book 1001 Video Games You Must Play Before You Die. IGN ranked the game 84th in their "Top 100 SNES Games of All Time" list. In 1995, Total! rated the game 40th on their "Top 100 SNES Games" list. They commented that Super Tennis is superb and it does not have as many features compared to Smash Tennis and praised the gameplay as "unbelievably slick".
