= Dr. Robotnik's Mean Bean Machine =

1993 video game

- North American Genesis box art
- Developer: Compile
- Publisher: Sega
- Directors: Tetsuo Shinyu; Takayuki Yanagihori; Masanobu Tsukamoto
- Producers: Yoji Ishii; Noriyoshi Oba; Masamitsu Niitani; Max Taylor
- Programmers: Manabu Ishihara; Tsukasa Aoki
- Composers: Masanori Hikichi; Masayuki Nagao
- Series: Sonic the Hedgehog; Puyo Puyo
- Platforms: Sega Genesis; Game Gear; Master System
- Release: Genesis; NA: December 1993; EU: January 21, 1994; Game Gear; NA: December 1993; EU: March 1994; Master System; EU: March 1994
- Genre: Falling block puzzle
- Modes: Single-player, multiplayer

Dr. Robotnik's Mean Bean Machine (Note: Alternatively named Dr. Robotnik and His Mean Bean Machine in European countries outside the United Kingdom and Dr. Eggman's Mean Bean Machine (Dr.(ドクター)エッグマンのミーンビーンマシーン, Dokutā Egguman no Mīn Bīn Mashīn) in Japanese compilation releases.) is a falling block puzzle video game developed by Compile and published by Sega. It was released for the Sega Genesis and Game Gear in 1993 and ported to the Master System in 1994.

The game is a Westernized version of Compile's Puyo Puyo (1991), replacing almost all of its characters with those from the Sonic the Hedgehog franchise, specifically the Adventures of Sonic the Hedgehog animated series. The Puyo Puyo character Carbuncle appears under the name "Has Bean" and makes different animations depending on how the player plays the game. The gameplay is similar to puzzle games such as Tetris, in which the player organises coloured shapes as they descend a board. The plot sees Sonic antagonist Doctor Robotnik kidnapping residents from Beanville and turning them into robots. The game received generally positive reviews, with critics praising the gameplay but criticising the difficulty.

== Premise and gameplay ==
Gameplay of the final stage

The game is set on the planet Mobius, which is inhabited by bean-like creatures. Doctor Robotnik conceives a plan to bring terror to the world by kidnapping the citizens of Beanville and turning them into robot slaves, and eventually creating an army that will help him rid the planet of fun and joy. To achieve this, he creates the "Mean Bean-Steaming Machine" in order to transform the bean-like creatures into robots. Putting his plan into motion, Robotnik sends out his Henchbots (among them some of the bounty hunters that had appeared in the AoStH episode "Super Special Sonic Search and Smash Squad") to gather all the bean-like creatures and group them together in dark dungeons so they can be sent to the Mean Bean-Steaming Machine. The rest of the game's story revolves around the player character, "Has Bean", and their journey to stop Robotnik's henchmen by breaking into the dungeons and freeing the bean-like creatures.

Dr. Robotnik's Mean Bean Machine is based on Puyo Puyo, a Japanese falling-block puzzle game. In the story, players must rescue Beanville from Dr. Robotnik and his army of Badniks. In Scenario Mode, the player plays against 13 increasingly challenging computer opponents. In the multiplayer 1P vs 2P Mode, two players battle against each other, and in Exercise Mode, players can simply practice. The Game Gear and Master System versions feature an additional mode, Puzzle Mode, in which players must attempt to clear predetermined sets of beans. On each player's grid, groups of beans fall from the top of the screen and can be moved and rotated until they reach the bottom. When four beans of the same colour are matched together, they disappear from the grid, causing any beans above to drop. These beans can trigger other matches, resulting in chain combos. By performing chain combos, players can send grey "refugee beans" to hinder their opponent. These beans cannot be matched normally and can only be removed by completing a match adjacent to them. A player loses when beans spill over the top of the board, leaving them unable to add more beans into the grid.

== Development and release ==
Dr. Robotnik's Mean Bean Machine is a Westernized version of Puyo Puyo (1991), a Japanese falling-block puzzle game developed by Compile and released for the MSX2 in 1991. Fearing that the game would not be popular with Western audiences, Sega replaced the characters of Puyo Puyo with those from the Sonic the Hedgehog franchise, particularly those from the 1993 Adventures of Sonic the Hedgehog animated series. An 8-bit version was also released for the Game Gear in the same year and the Master System in the following year, adapted from the Japanese Nazo Puyo game.

Dr. Robotnik's Mean Bean Machine has also appeared in retrospective compilations, such as Sonic Classics 3 in 1 for the Genesis in 1995, Sonic Mega Collection for the GameCube in 2002, as an unlockable bonus Game Gear game in Sonic Adventure DX: Director's Cut for the GameCube and Windows in 2003, Sonic Mega Collection Plus for the PlayStation 2 and Xbox in 2004; which also contains the Game Gear version, Sonic's Ultimate Genesis Collection (known as Sega Mega Drive Ultimate Collection in PAL regions) for PlayStation 3 and Xbox 360 in 2009, and Sega Genesis Classics (known as Sega Mega Drive Classics in PAL regions) for the Nintendo Switch, PlayStation 4, and Xbox One in 2018. In 2006, Sega released the game on the Wii's Virtual Console. In 2010, it was released on Windows via Steam. In June 2013, the Game Gear version was released for the Nintendo 3DS via its Virtual Console emulation service. In 2021, the Genesis version was released on the Nintendo Classics service. On June 23, 2023, the Game Gear version was released on Sonic Origins Plus.

== Reception ==
Reception

Aggregate score
Aggregator	Score
GameRankings	75%

Review scores
Publication	Score
AllGame	3.5/5
Computer and Video Games	90%
Electronic Gaming Monthly	8/10, 8/10, 7/10, 8/10, 7/10
Eurogamer	4/5
GamePro	5/5
GameSpot	6.3/10
IGN	7.5/10
Jeuxvideo.com	15/20
Nintendo Life	6/10 (Mega Drive); 7/10 (Game Gear)
Nintendo World Report	8/10 (Game Gear)
Mega	90%
Gamezebo	3/5
Joypad	87%

Critics praised the various aspects of gameplay, although the puzzle genre's difficulty and overuse were negative factors. Andy Dyer from Mega acknowledged that the game had a simple concept and also observed that it did not provide enough of a challenge. Lucas Thomas of IGN enjoyed the game's array of puzzles and recognised that its design was intended to encourage two-player competition. Reviewing the Mega Drive version, Damien McFerran of Nintendo Life similarly echoed Thomas' opinion of the game's intention to encourage two-player competition, and also noted that it provided a "decent" challenge despite viewing that a single player could get bored easily. In contrast, Andrew Webster of Gamezebo criticised the high level of difficulty and the game's general accessibility due to its "ancient" password save system. Aaron Thomas of GameSpot found the game difficult to recommend due to the availability of free Puyo Puyo clones on the PC, but commended its basic mechanics, a wide range of game modes, and gradually increasing difficulty. Eurogamer's Kristan Reed labelled the game as a "fairly unapologetic reskin" of Puyo Puyo and thought that Sega decided to "shoehorn" it into the Sonic the Hedgehog franchise in order to enhance their sales, although Reed admitted the gameplay was solid and addictive. A reviewer from Jeuxvideo.com questioned the game's originality, saying that "stacking beans to make them disappear is not a new concept" but would still satisfy fans of the genre. Amanda Tipping from Computer and Video Games thought that the game was as addictive and as puzzling as the Tetris series, and also preferred the game's colourful visuals as opposed to Tetris. GamePro reviewer Andromeda found the game most enjoyable when using an offensive strategy.

The Game Gear version was well received. In a retrospective review, Ron DelVillano from Nintendo Life praised the game's wide variety of game modes but noted the soundtrack's lack of diversity. DelVillano also thought that the graphics had not aged well as of 2013, but accepted that games in the puzzle genre did not require prominent visuals. In a similar vein, a reviewer from Joypad opined that the game's graphics were not "a joy" to look at, but understood that it was "normal" for a game of that genre. Neal Ronaghan of Nintendo World Report lauded the game's addictive and "fun" puzzle gameplay but admitted it contained flaws due to the limitations of the Game Gear. In 1995, Mega Zone included the game in their "Top 50 Games in History".

== See also ==
- Kirby's Avalanche, an international reskin of Puyo Puyo for the Super Nintendo Entertainment System
