= Tokyo Shoseki =

Japanese publishing company

Tokyo Shoseki Co.Ltd
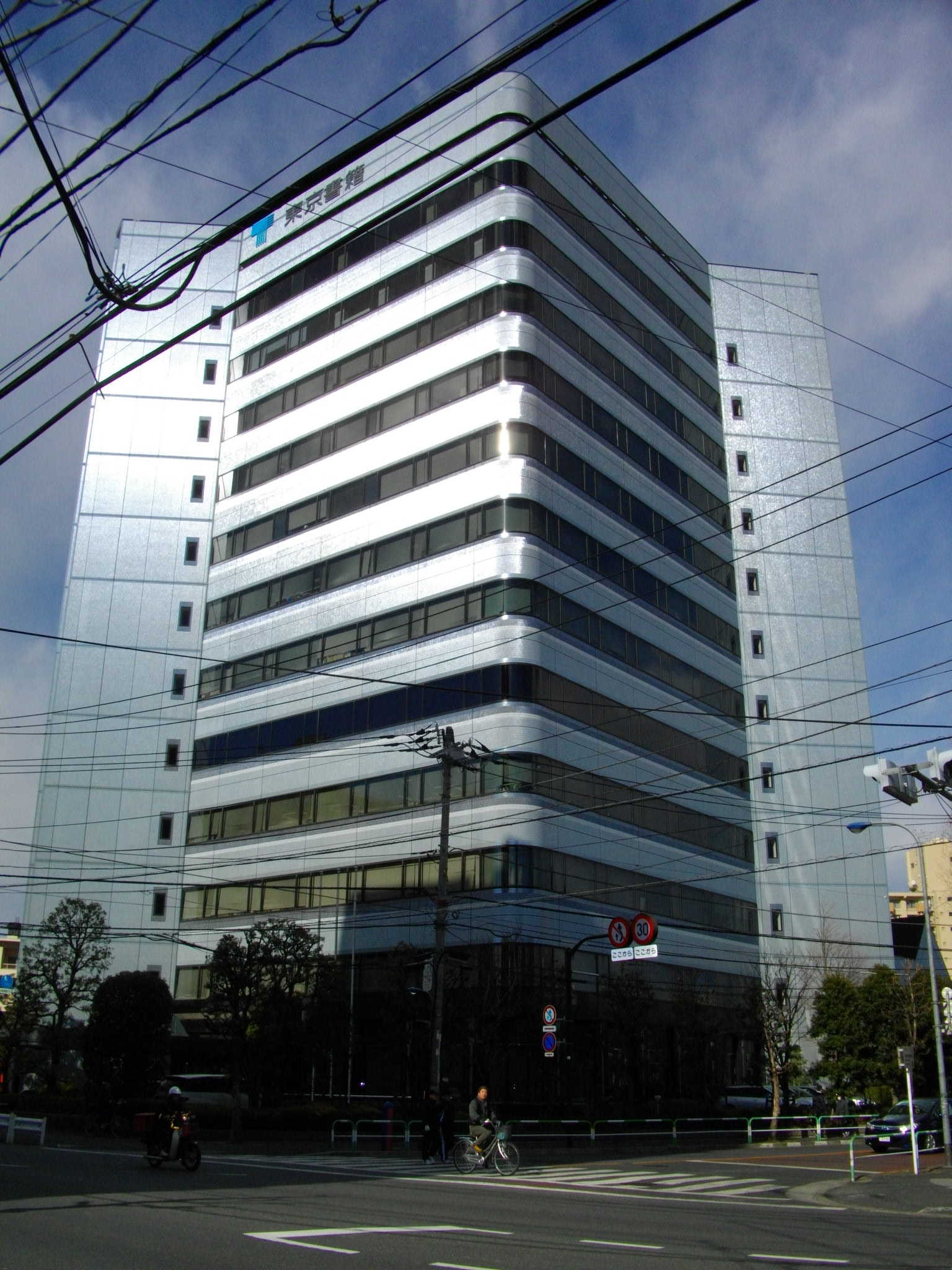
- Industry: Publisher
- Founded: 1909
- Headquarters: Horifune, Kita-ku, Tokyo, Japan
- Area served: Japan
- Key people: Norio Watanabe (President)
- Products: textbook, digital textbook, book, software
- Number of employees: 500

Tokyo Shoseki Co. Ltd. (東京書籍株式会社) is a Japanese company engaged in the textbook and other publishing businesses. The company is well known as the largest publisher of textbooks in Japan, but also publishes reference books and Digital textbooks, educational assessment question, and many other general books (mainly educational books, personal documents, and literary books), in a wide range of business areas. The company was founded in 1909 and celebrated its 100th anniversary in 2009.

== Product areas ==
=== Textbook ===
- For elementary schools – 10 types (Japanese, shodo-calligraphy, social studies, arithmetic, science, English, life, home economics, physical education, and morality) are published.
- For junior high schools – 10 types (Japanese, shodo-calligraphy, social studies, mathematics, science, English, home economics and technology, physical education, and morality) are published.
- For high schools – 8 types (Japanese, geography, maps, mathematics, science, English, home economics and technology, shodo-calligraphy, and information) are published.

=== Digital textbook ===
Digital textbooks have been produced that correspond to the above textbooks. In addition, they have produced teaching materials that are compatible with digital textbooks.

=== Study reference book ===
A number of reference books, workbooks that correspond to the above textbooks have been published.

=== Educational assessment ===
An educational Assessment for elementary and middle schools. In addition to ability of each subject, they also survey life behavior.

=== Book ===
- Sushi Handbook – A series of hand-held notebooks containing information on specific fields such as sushi and sake.
- Emperor Showa Jitsuroku – Compiled by the Imperial Household Agency, 19 volumes in all. The works of Emperor Showa for 89 years from his birth in the 34th year of Meiji to his death in the 64th year of Showa.

=== Video game ===
The company used to publish games like Cycle Race: Road Man and Super Tennis. The company developed video games from 1986 to 1998; their last game was Go-Jin Senki for the Sony PlayStation. All resources were eventually re-allocated to their Tonkin House company. As of 2008, Tokyo Shoseki makes textbooks and educational software.
