= Aleste 2 =

1989 video game

- Developer: Compile
- Publisher: Compile
- Producer: Masamitsu Niitani
- Designers: Takayuki Hirono; Katsuji Suenaga; Kenkoh Nakashima
- Programmers: Takayuki Hirono; Koji Mizuta
- Artists: Hiromichi Sueyoshi; Inu Nakashima
- Composers: Masatomo Miyamoto; Toshiaki Sakoda; Sydon Inoue
- Series: Aleste
- Platforms: MSX2, Windows
- Release: November 1989 (MSX); 2009 (Windows)
- Genre: Vertical scrolling shooter
- Mode: Single-player

Aleste 2 (アレスタ2) is a scrolling shooter video game developed and released by Compile for the MSX2 in 1989 exclusively in Japan. It is a sequel to Aleste and is the first game in the Aleste series to feature the recurring series heroine Ellinor who later appeared in Musha Aleste. Aleste 2, along with other Compile shooters, was also released for the now-defunct WOOMB service. In 2009, ProjectEGG released the game digitally for Windows, also in English.

== Gameplay ==
Just like in the first Aleste, the player controls a spaceship the flies across a scrolling land. It features the same gameplay from its predecessor, with multiple weapons which are equipped by picking the corresponding icon, though this time the player can choose its starting secondary weapon before starting the game, with the chosen weapon becoming more powerful.

== Plot ==
The game takes place in the year 2039, two decades after the supercomputer DIA 51 attacked and decimated the Earth. After the long restoration period, Earth is invaded by a race of alien plantlike humanoids called the Vagand, intent on finding a new food source on Earth. In their first attack on Earth, the Vagand destroy an Earth space cruiser commanded by the previous Earth hero, Ray Waizen. Their plan to invade Earth is challenged by the newest version of the Aleste piloted by the daughter of Ray and Yuri Waizen, Ellinor, who has vowed to avenge her father's death and to personally kill the Vagand leader Gaizel.

== Development and release ==
Former Compile members Yuichi Toyama and Kazuyuki Nakashima stated that a prototype of Aleste 2 for Sega Mega Drive was developed but it was ultimately reworked into MUSHA.

== Reception ==
Retro Gamer included it among top ten MSX games. While the three Aleste titles for the MSX computers "all are worth seeking out", they chose Aleste 2 "because it looks superb, allows you to select your weapons at the start of the game, and is the first title in the canon to feature reoccurring protagonist Ellinor".

== Adaptation ==
Aleste 2 was adapted into a manga on January 8, 1990 in Japan and it is part of the Compile Club series.
