= Alien Crush Returns =

2008 video game

- Developer: Tamsoft
- Publisher: Hudson Soft
- Director: Adrian Ludley
- Designer: Yoshiyuki Urushibara
- Series: Crush Pinball
- Platform: WiiWare
- Release: JP: August 26, 2008; NA: November 3, 2008; PAL: November 7, 2008
- Genre: Pinball
- Modes: Single-player, multiplayer

Alien Crush Returns is a WiiWare pinball video game developed by Tamsoft and published by Hudson Soft. It is a sequel/remake to 1988's Alien Crush, and is the fourth installment in the Crush Pinball series. It was released in Japan on August 26, 2008, in North America on November 3 and in Europe on November 7.

== Overview ==
In comparison to the original game, Alien Crush Returns features 3D graphics and controls using the Wii Remote and Nunchuk that allow functions such as tilting the table using motion sensing. In addition, the game introduces "Action Balls", pinballs with special attributes that can be used repeatedly during gameplay. Downloadable content in the form of extra stages and additional Action Balls could be available as well.

The game features a high score-based arcade mode where players can select from three tables, a six-stage story mode with gameplay goals and boss battles, as well as online versus multiplayer and leaderboards.

== Reception ==
Reception

Aggregate score
Aggregator	Score
Metacritic	64/100

Review scores
Publication	Score
IGN	7.8/10
Nintendo Life	8/10

Alien Crush Returns received mixed reviews from critics upon release. On Metacritic, the game holds a score of 64/100 based on 5 reviews, indicating "mixed or average reviews".

IGN gave the game a 7.8/10, calling the visual presentation impressive but noting some slight ball physics issues and that overall the game was short, with only three tables out of the box. Nintendo Life gave the game a score of 8 out of 10 stars, praising the game for being similar to the original game while feeling new at the same time, but also cites the game's short length.
