= Jaki Crush =

1992 video game

- Cover art
- Developer: Compile
- Publisher: NAXAT Soft
- Series: Crush Pinball
- Platform: Super Famicom
- Release: JP: December 18, 1992
- Genre: Pinball
- Mode: Single-player

Jaki Crush (Note: Japanese: 邪鬼破壊, Hepburn: Jaki Hakai; lit. "Evil Demon Destruction") is a pinball video game developed by Compile and published by NAXAT Soft. Jaki Crush was released exclusively in Japan for the Super Famicom in 1992. The game is the third in the Crush Pinball series, and was preceded by Alien Crush and Devil's Crush (Devil Crash on the PC Engine in Japan) on the TurboGrafx-16.

== Gameplay ==
The game features a theme revolving around the mythology of a type of Japanese demon or ogre, called a jaki and is inspired by traditional Japanese depictions of hell. A single table is divided into three different sectors; carrying two flippers each. Moving targets must be hit for points along with stationary targets. Shooting the ball into the demon's mouth allows players to access up to six bonus levels.

== Reception ==
Reception

Review scores
| Publication | Score |
|---|---|
| Aktueller Software Markt | 9/12 |
| Computer and Video Games | 70/100 |
| GameFan | 306/400 |
| Joypad | 67% |
| Joystick | 62% |
| Mega Fun | 76/100 |
| Official Nintendo Magazine | 86/100 |
| Super Play | 73% |
| Total! | 61% |
| Video Games (DE) | 64% |
| Control | 68% |
| Game Power | 34/40 |
| N-Force | 56/100 |
| Nintendo Game Zone | 78/100 |
| Play Time | 81% |
| SNES Force | 56% |
| The Super Famicom | 65/100 |
| Super Power | 70/100 |

Jaki Crush received mixed reception from critics, all of which reviewed it as an import title. Game Power's Lord Mathias praised the visuals for their quality and "terrifying" graphical effects, rock opera-style sound, fun factor and challenge. Mega Fun's Ulf Schneider commended its audiovisual presentation and fun factor. Despite comparisons with Devil's Crush, Schneider labeled it as a "thoroughly good fantasy pinball game and a welcome change in the otherwise weak pinball genre." Joypad's Olivier Prézeau and Joystick's Jean-Marc Demoly gave positive remarks to the graphics, animations and audio, but felt mixed regarding its limited controls and ultimately found the game to be monotonous compared to Devil's Crush. In contrast, Play Time's Ray wrote that it was a great pinball game despite heavily borrowing from Devil's Crush, highlighting its presentation and playability. Echoing similar thoughts as Prézeau and Demoly, Video Games' Jan Barysch expressed mixed feelings towards the graphical presentation and criticized the overall audio design, but noted that the game was playable and varied due to the constantly changing playfield and abundance of bonus rounds. Regardless, Barysch felt that the title was weaker than Devil's Crush.

Aktueller Software Markt's Hans-Joachim Amann praised the visual style and realistic behavior of the ball. However, Amann stated that its music tracks were mediocre and unfitting for gameplay, an aspect he felt it was not as "snappy" as Devil's Crush. Nevertheless, Amann recommended it for pinball fans. N-Force's Chris Rice and Carl Rowley found the graphics to be dark and sinister, but criticized the "rocky" soundtrack and slow action restricted to a single table, labeling its gameplay to be poor and repetitive. Computer and Video Games' Garth Sumpter commended its diabolic-themed graphical style and gameplay but ultimately found the title to be dull and uninspired, criticizng the monotonous music. Joystiq's J.C. Fletcher wrote that "Jaki Crush is merely the third best video pinball game" due to its bonus stages and excellent pinball physics, but felt that it failed to stand up visually compared to Alien Crush and Devil's Crush on PC Engine. Contrasting most reviewers, Hardcore Gaming 101 felt that the presentation exceeded any game in the Crush Pinball series, giving positive remarks to the jaki-inspired visuals and audio, but they lamented its lack of release outside of Japan.
