= Sega Zone =

Defunct video game magazine 1992-1994

- March 1993 cover
- Editor: Amaya Lopez
- Categories: Video game magazines
- Frequency: Monthly
- First issue: November 1992
- Final issue: 1994
- Company: Dennis Publishing (November 1992 - 1993); Future Publishing (1993 - Early 1994); Maverick Magazines (1994)
- Country: United Kingdom
- Based in: London
- Language: English
- ISSN: 0967-7291
- OCLC: 500046860

Sega Zone was a Sega orientated publication from Dennis Publishing in the early 1990s. Sega Zone had split off from the former multiformat console title Game Zone, which continued as a Nintendo magazine. Early Dennis Publishing staff members included launch editor Amaya Lopez, deputy editor Vivienne Nagy, and staff writer Martin Pond.

In 1993 Sega Zone, along with Game Zone, was sold to Future Publishing. During this period Sega Zone had the following familiar Future names working for the magazine; Tim Norris (editor), Tim Tucker (deputy editor), Josse Billson (staff writer) and Stuart Campbell (longtime contributor).

In early 1994 Future Publishing itself sold the Sega Zone title onto Maverick Magazines. Later that year the titles were closed down.

== See also ==
- Sega Power
- Sega Force
- Sega Pro
- Mean Machines Sega
- Sega Magazine
