= Tonkin House =

Japanese video game publisher

- Industry: Video games
- Founded: 1988
- Defunct: 2008
- Headquarters: Japan
- Website: Original http://www.tokyo-shoseki.co.jp/tonkin/tkindexj.htm (archived); Last working http://www.tokyo-shoseki.co.jp/tonkin (archived)

Tonkin House was a Japanese video game publisher owned by Tokyo Shoseki, which was active in late 1980s and early 2000s.

== Video games ==
- Super Tennis (1991, Super NES)
- Dig & Spike Volleyball (1992, Super NES)
- Felicia (1995, Super NES)
- Super Rugby (1994, Super NES)
- Ugetsu Kitan (1996, PlayStation)
- Juggernaut (1998, PlayStation)

== See also ==
- Tokyo Shoseki
