= Dragon's Revenge =

1993 video game

- Japanese cover art
- Developer: Tengen
- Publisher: Tengen
- Producer: Mitzi S. McGilvray
- Designers: Peter Adams; Joe Hitchens; Bill Hindorff
- Programmer: Peter Adams
- Artists: Joe Hitchens; Steve Klein; Jay Ryness
- Composer: Earl Vickers
- Platform: Sega Genesis
- Release: NA: November 1993; JP: December 10, 1993; EU: January 14, 1994
- Genre: Pinball
- Mode: Single-player

Dragon's Revenge (ドラゴンズ・リベンジ) is a pinball video game by Tengen, released for Sega Genesis in 1993. It is a follow-up to Devil's Crush (Dragon's Fury), a pinball game set in sword and sorcery scenario, wherein the player has to defeat a dragon and a witch. The game was released to generally positive reviews.

== Gameplay ==
There are several various stages and bonus/boss stages in the game. None of the stages attempt to simulate an actual pinball machine like in most other pinball games and the game only uses basic pinball mechanics.

== Plot ==
The village of Kalfin's Keep has been enslaved by a villain and his consort Darzel, who used her magic to capture three adventurers: Kragor the warrior, a female barbarian named Flavia, and a good sorceress named Rina. The player's role is to guide magic balls (the game's game pinball balls) as a weapon on the quest to rescue the captive heroes, and then them lead in their fight against the forces of darkness. If the game is finished, the dragon is slain and Darzel gets herself trapped in a ball.

== Reception ==
Dragon's Revenge was given a review score of 14.5 out of 20 by GamePro, who called it "a solid game for pinball fans and gamers who like fast action" and have enjoyed Dragon's Fury. Electronic Gaming Monthly complimented the graphics and said the game was worthwhile for those who like pinball games, giving it a 6.8 out of 10. Mean Machines Sega rated 74% but opined it was a mediocre title and a disappointment compared to Dragon's Fury two years earlier. A review in Sega Visions, however, was much more positive, as were the reviews in French magazines such as Consoles Plus (90%), Joypad (83%), MEGA Force (84%), and Player One (89%).

== See also ==
- Ultimate Pinball Quest
