= Star Soldier: Vanishing Earth =

1998 video game

- North American Nintendo 64 cover art
- Developer: Hudson Soft
- Publishers: JP: Hudson Soft; NA: Electro Brain
- Producer: Toshiyuki Takahashi
- Series: Star Soldier
- Platforms: Arcade, Nintendo 64
- Release: N64: JP: 10 July 1998; NA: 15 December 1998; Arcade: JP: November 1998
- Genre: Vertically scrolling shooter
- Mode: Single-player
- Arcade system: Aleck 64

Star Soldier: Vanishing Earth (Note: Japanese: スターソルジャー・バニシングアース, Hepburn: Sutā Sorujā Banishingu Āsu) is a 1998 shoot 'em up video game developed and published by Hudson Soft (Electro Brain for the North American release) for the Nintendo 64. It serves as a direct sequel to Soldier Blade and is part of the Star Soldier series. An arcade version was also released for Seta's Aleck 64, an arcade hardware system similar to the Nintendo 64.

== Gameplay ==
Gameplay screenshot

Star Soldier: Vanishing Earth is a science fiction-themed vertically scrolling shoot 'em up game. Players can collect power-ups to increase the damage of their shot, roll to create shields which block enemy damage, and fire limited-use "ExARMS" attacks which deal incredible damage to enemies.

== Reception ==
Reception

Aggregate score
Aggregator	Score
GameRankings	52.40%

Review scores
Publication	Score
AllGame	2.5/5
CNET Gamecenter	7/10
Electronic Gaming Monthly	7/10, 4.5/10, 4.5/10, 7/10
Famitsu	6/10, 5/10, 5/10, 5/10
IGN	5/10
N64 Magazine	62%
Nintendo Power	7.2/10
Total!	65/100
64 Magazine	65%
Digital Press	4/10
Gamers' Republic	C
N64 Pro	35%

Star Soldier: Vanishing Earth received mixed reception from critics, holding a rating of 52.40% based on five reviews according to review aggregator GameRankings.
