= Adventures of Dino Riki =

1987 video game

- North American cover art
- Developer(s): Hudson Soft
- Publisher(s): JP: Rix Soft; NA: Hudson Soft
- Designer(s): Meijin Sakurada
- Programmer(s): Shinichi Nakamoto; Hitoshi Okuno
- Artist(s): Gaku Miyao
- Composer(s): Takeaki Kunimoto
- Platform(s): Nintendo Entertainment System
- Release: JP: February 10, 1987; NA: October 1989
- Genre(s): Scrolling shooter
- Mode(s): Single-player

Adventures of Dino Riki, known in Japan as Shin Jinrui: The New Type (新人類; lit. "New Humans"), is a scrolling shooter video game developed by Hudson Soft for the Nintendo Entertainment System. The player takes on the role of the titular Dino Riki in a prehistoric setting, tasked with completing a series of vertically-scrolling stages while contending with various enemies, platforming sections, and bosses. Power-ups that improve the player's weapons or mobility can be uncovered by hitting boulders scattered about each stage.

Japanese magazines previewed it as an action game with unique mechanics before it was converted into a scrolling shooter just prior to launch. Hudson had desired to release a game similar to Konami's 1986 MSX shooter Knightmare. The Adventures of Dino Riki development staff has only been revealed through social media posts. Wrestler Riki Choshu lent his name and likeness to the project and was featured prominently in its Japanese advertising.

Due to a five game-per-year limit imposed by Nintendo on its licensees, Hudson partnered with electronics corporation Ricoh to get Adventures of Dino Riki released in Japan under the briefly-established Rix Soft label in early 1987. Hudson self-published it in North America in late 1989. It was met with average review scores and mixed opinions regarding its graphics, gameplay, and difficulty.

== Gameplay ==
Dino Riki throws a series of stone axes at some enemies. The player's health, score and remaining lives are displayed at the top.

Adventures of Dino Riki is a scrolling shooter where the player takes on the role of the titular, primitive human Dino Riki in a prehistoric setting with dinosaurs. Each stage scrolls vertically with the objective being to avoid enemies and their projectiles then to defeat the boss at its end. Dino Riki can move in all directions, jump, and throw weapons to destroy enemies and uncover health and power-ups from boulders strewn about the landscape. These power-ups include speed boosts, wings that enable flight, and enhanced weapons. The player begins with rocks which can be upgraded to stone axes, then boomerangs, and finally torches, each consecutively improving range and spread of attack. A hidden item tile will transform the player into Macho Riki who can fire powerful projections of himself.

The game has four stages with the last of these consisting of four sub-stages. Some stages contain environmental hazards. For instance, the first features platforming sections with a bodies of water and lilypads that the player must jump or fly across. Some lilypads move back and forth while others submerge then resurface. Falling into the water results in instant death. Taking a hit from an enemy will drop speed and weapon upgrades down one level while dying will remove all power-ups and bring the player back to specific checkpoints.

== Development and release ==
Adventures of Dino Riki was developed by Hudson Soft. Previews in Japanese magazines revealed that it was initially an action game with unique mechanics before being reworked into a scrolling shooter mere months before launch. In this earlier incarnation the player would have scrolled to different screens by following the direction indicated by an arrow. The objective on each screen would be to pick up three flowers while battling enemies, who would have to be stunned with stones then kicked offscreen. The player could still uncover item tiles which would have included additional power-ups for moving over different terrain, a stopwatch for freezing enemies, and others. It would have consisted of 16 stages with a boss on every fourth stage. Features such as a day/night cycle and bonus stages were also shown.

South Korean-Japanese professional wrestler Riki Choshu, who was at the height of his popularity, lent his name and likeness to the game. The game was not conceived with Choshu's inclusion and his celebrity status was intended to increase sales. In the pre-release version of the game, Choshu's sprite could appear on-screen as a separate character to assist the player. In the final Japanese version, the transformed protagonist's clone attack is officially called the "Riki Lariat," Choshu's signature move.

The game's development team was never made public by Hudson, but former employees have mentioned its history through social media posts. Beep magazine columnist Hiroaki Iwasaki interviewed some of the company's personnel. Programmer Satoshi Mikami told Iwasaki that he was not involved in the production but claimed that Hudson wished to release a scrolling shooter similar to Konami's Knightmare, first available for the MSX in 1986. Makami further stated that the "New Humans" from the Japanese title references the new staff brought in for the project. Hudson executive Toshiyuki Takahashi wrote that the moniker was chosen because Shin Jinrui was Japan's "buzzword of the year" for 1986.

Iwasaki determined that the game was programmed by Shinichi Nakamoto and Hitoshi Okuno. Sakurada Meijin, a disciple of Takahashi, worked on it as well. Manga artist Gaku Miyao created its cover illustration. He had been instructed to "make it with rolling energy" but that it was not specified he include Choshu in the image. The girl featured on the Japanese cover does not appear in the game and Miyao admitted he added her unprompted. Takeaki Kunimoto is credited online as the game's music composer. However, when talking about the Hudson music compilation 20th Century Famicom Boy on his own blog, Kunimoto stated that he only made the boss victory jingle and that his old colleague Daisuke Inoue was mostly likely responsible for the bulk of the tracks. Sound programmer Keita Hoshi told Iwasaki that he believed Toshiaki Takimoto worked as its audio based on a process of elimination, but Iwasaki concluded it was instead Fumihiko Itagaki.

Nintendo restricted its licensees to releasing just five titles per year for its Family Computer console. Wanting to exceed this limit, Hudson partnered with electronics corporation Ricoh as a workaround and briefly established a software branch called Rix Soft to publish Shin Jinrui in the developer's stead. The game was originally scheduled for retail in Japan in mid-December 1986 but was delayed until February 10, 1987. Takahashi and Choshu both appeared in print and television advertisements as well as at a live promotion at the Ryōgoku Kokugikan arena. Hudson announced the game as Adventures of Dino Riki for the Nintendo Entertainment System at the Winter Consumer Electronics Show in January 1989 and self-published it in North America that October. Hudson advertised it alongside their Joycard Samsui SSS, a gamepad with rapid-fire capability and a port for wired earbuds.

== Reception and legacy ==
Reception

Review scores
Publication	Score
AllGame	3.5/5
Famitsu	23/40
Nintendo Power	3.25/5
Famicom Hisshoubon	3/5

Adventures of Dino Riki received consistently mediocre review scores but drew a mixed response from critics who disagreed on its presentation, gameplay quality, and challenge level. One writer for the Japanese magazine Famicom Hisshōbon complimented the game's visuals but found it to be a standard shooter best enjoyed by fans of the genre. The quartet of commentators from Famicom Tsūshin compared the gameplay to Knightmare and Hudson's own Star Soldier with one reviewer noting the difficulty of battling numerous onscreen enemies that do not fit the prehistoric setting. Gary Meredith of Game Players positively stated "Adventures of Dino-Riki won't be mistaken for an educational program on prehistory. But it does provide nonstop action and excitement, spiced with a touch of humor." Computer Entertainer felt that despite its nice graphics, the game was most likely only geared toward young boys and that it offered nothing unique compared to many other titles in the same genre.

AllGame’s Brett Alan Weiss called the game "easy to learn, yet challenging enough for most action fans." Weiss opined that the scenery could be dull at times, but that the variety of swarming enemies would be enough to keep a player busy. Hardcore Gaming 101 contributor Steven Barbato was also complimentary of its overall presentation and assortment of enemies but labelled the platforming segments the game's biggest weakness, especially when the player collects too many speed powerups. "While skilled players can hold onto a flight power-up to bypass some of these platforming sections, it won't take long for most people to become utterly demoralized," he concluded. A later issue of Game Players opined that the game, alongside Hudson Soft's Adventure Island, would most likely be too difficult for inexperienced or younger players. Damien McFerran of Retro Gamer considered Adventures of Dino Riki among Hudson's weakest games when chronicling the company's past. "Terrible graphics, a steep learning curve and an over-reliance on power ups (lose them and you may as well reset the game) result in a title so poor it's not surprising no one's heard of it," he said of the game. "And there are hardly any dinosaurs in it."

In October 1991, South Korean developer Zemina released unlicensed ports of Adventures of Dino Riki to the MSX and Master System under the title Wonsiin (Korean: 원시인; lit. "Primitive Man"). It features altered versions of the original game's first three stages and omits the final stage altogether. A sequel to Wonsiin was announced in 1992 but was cancelled.
