= Star Soldier (video game) =

1986 video game

- North American NES cover art
- Developer: Hudson Soft
- Publishers: JP: Hudson Soft; NA: Taxan
- Composer: Takeaki Kunimoto
- Series: Star Soldier
- Platforms: NES, MSX, mobile phone, Palm OS, Game Boy Advance, iOS
- Release: June 13, 1986: NES; JP: June 13, 1986; NA: January 1989; MSX; JP: 1986; Mobile; JP: January 26, 2001; JP: March 2, 2004 (Special+); JP: December 14, 2005 (SP Arcade); JP: October 6, 2008 (Fukkoku-Ban); Palm OS; JP: November 22, 2001; Game Boy Advance; JP: February 14, 2004; iOS; NA: January 4, 2012; JP: June 20, 2013 (GREE)
- Genre: Scrolling shooter
- Mode: Single-player

Star Soldier (Note: Japanese: スターソルジャー, Hepburn: Sutā Sorujā) is a 1986 vertically scrolling shooter video game developed and published by Hudson Soft for the Nintendo Entertainment System and MSX. It is the first game in the Star Soldier series. The player pilots the starship "Caesar", traveling through space stations occupied by powerful supercomputers known as "Starbrains" who threaten the galactic empire. Star Soldier greatly resembles the earlier arcade game Star Force.

Mobile versions were released on January 26, 2001, in Japan as Star Soldier Special+ in 2004, Star Soldier SP Arcade in 2005 and Star Soldier Fukkoku-Ban (Note: Japanese: スターソルジャー 復刻版, Hepburn: Sutāsorujā fukkoku-ban) in 2008; they were also released for Palm OS in November 2001 in Japan and iOS on January 4, 2012, in United States.

Star Soldier has spawned numerous sequels, starting with Super Star Soldier on the PC Engine. It was ported to the Game Boy Advance in 2004 in Japan as part of the Famicom Mini series, and to the Wii's Virtual Console in the Japanese and North American regions in July 2007. An enhanced remake of the game was released on PlayStation Portable only in Japan in 2005.

Star Soldier was re-released by Konami on the Nintendo 3DS Virtual Console on November 14, 2012, in Japan, on August 15, 2013, in PAL regions, and September 24 in North America, and via iOS, titled Star Soldier for GREE (Note: Japanese: スターソルジャー for GREE, Hepburn: Sutāsorujā for GREE) on June 20, 2013, in Japan.

== Gameplay ==
Star Soldier is a vertically scrolling shooter where the player controls the pilot and space fighter Caesar in a ship. The player can move and shoot enemies that appear from the top of the screen. Bullets from the starship can hit both flying and grounded enemies, and the player only has one shooting attack. The game has sixteen unique stages with vertically scrolling background and foreground elements. With the scrolling background of the space station, the player may occasionally enter the "trap zone", an area where the ship can fly underneath the space station to avoid enemy fire. Shooting the "P-mark" that appears in the stages can reward the player with a capsule, a power-up that increases the power of the ship's bullets as more capsules are collected. If the capsule is not collected, the ship will move slower and only shoot one bullet at a time. If two capsules are collected, the ship will transform and can be able to shoot from behind. If the player collects three capsules, the ship will start shooting in five directions and will summon a shield that protects the player until the ship is hit five times, with the fourth and final capsule collected being able to destroy any flying enemies. Starbrain appears as the boss fight at the end of each stage, with Big Starbrain, a harder variant of Starbrain, appearing in levels four, eight, twelve, and sixteen.

== Legacy ==
In 1987, Starship Hector originally released as a follow-up to the game Star Soldier. The game received its first sequel with Super Star Soldier on the PC Engine. In 1992, Star Parodier released for the PC Engine CD-ROM², and was a parody spin-off of the Star Soldier series.

Vertical Force, another vertically scrolling shooter released by Hudson Soft for the Virtual Boy contains similar gameplay mechanics to those introduced in Star Soldier.

In the Japanese exclusive game DreamMix TV World Fighters, the stage "Floating Continent" is a reference to Star Soldier, including enemies such as Lazaro that attack fighters during the match. The game's main character Caesar was put in Super Bomberman R as the character "Caesar Bomber". Sprites from the NES game were added to Hudson Soft's Puzzle Series Vol. 1: Jigsaw Puzzle on Nintendo DS in Japan and Konami's Pixel Puzzle Collection on iOS and Android. On March 1, 2005, Hudson Soft released the Japan-exclusive mobile game Enfu 2: Revival Messiah with Caesar as a playable character alongside Bomberman. Both Kororinpa and Marble Saga: Kororinpa contain remixes from Star Soldier in the secret levels, along with other themes from Hudson Soft games. In 2021, Konami announced a contest encouraging indie developers to make games based on some of its classic series, including Star Soldier. The game was re-released on the Nintendo Classics service on April 2, 2019.

In DVD #21 of GameCenter CX (known as "Retro Game Master" outside Japan), Shinya Arino, the host of the show, played through the Star Soldier video game and successfully cleared it.

A promotional web manga 40th Anniversary of the Home Console Version of TwinBee, Nami-chan dresses up in a pilot costume directly referencing Star Soldier, a legendary shooter originally developed by Hudson Soft.
