= Lost in Shadow =

2010 video game

- North American box art
- Developer: Hudson Soft
- Publisher: Hudson Soft
- Director: Osamu Tsuchihashi
- Producer: Osamu Tsuchihashi
- Designers: Masakazu Echigo; Ryohei Sato
- Artist: Hiromasa Ogura
- Composer: Takasi Watanabe
- Platform: Wii
- Release: JP: July 22, 2010; AU: October 8, 2010; EU: October 15, 2010; NA: January 4, 2011
- Genre: Puzzle-platform
- Mode: Single-player

Lost in Shadow, known as A Shadow's Tale in Australia and Europe and as Kage no Tō (影の塔; lit. "Tower of Shadows") in Japan, is a puzzle-platform video game developed and published by Hudson Soft for the Wii. It was released in Japan in July 2010, in Australia and Europe in October 2010, and in North America in January 2011. It was also released for Wii U via Nintendo eShop in 2016 by Konami, 4 years after Hudson Soft was absorbed by the company. Lost in Shadow is played largely in the background of the game environment as the player controls a boy's shadow, which must climb the shadows of a tall tower, rife with puzzles and enemies. He is accompanied by a sylph that can alter the direction of the foreground light sources, altering the alignment of shadows upon which he climbs. There are times in the game when the boy is able to materialize into the three-dimensional world and briefly interact with the objects themselves as opposed to simply their shadows.

== Gameplay ==
Lost in Shadow is a 2D platform game. The player must navigate each level, fighting enemies, and using switches and levers to open up paths. Selected platforms can be rotated to provide different routes. At certain points, the player is given control over light sources in the foreground which can be moved to alter the layout of the level.

== Development ==
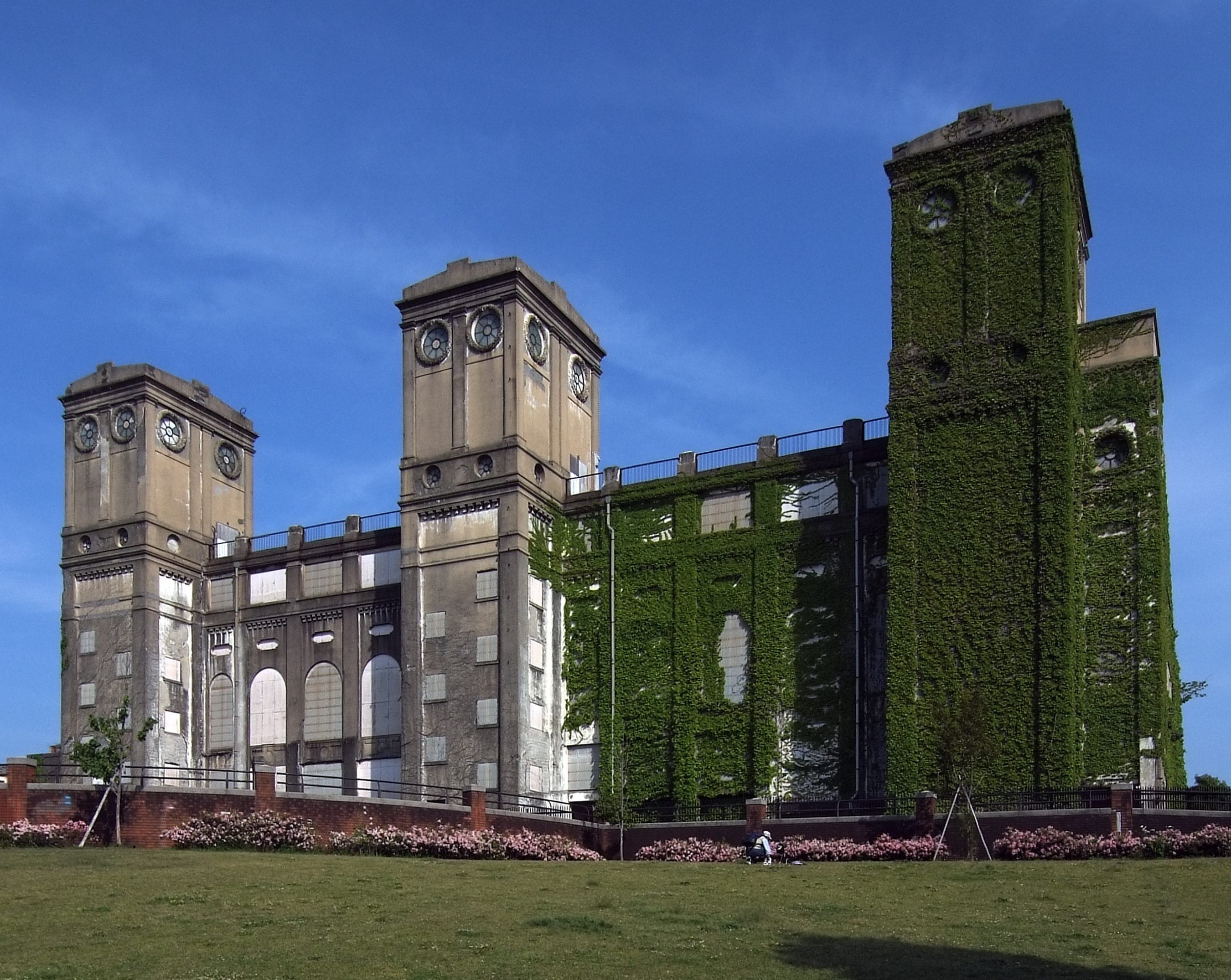
The old racing track in Negishi served as the principal basis for the atmosphere in the game.

Lost in Shadow was developed by the team at Hudson Soft that had previously created Kororinpa and its sequel for the Wii. The original inspiration came from the game shadow tag, the objective of which is to step on an opponent's shadow. Director Osamu Tsuchihashi was reminded of his experience with the game as a child when he saw some kids playing tag in a park. He conceived the concept of Lost in Shadow as a result, combining it with an earlier idea of a title revolving around climbing a tower. The atmosphere and setting of the game was based on a disused tower in Tokyo and an abandoned racing track in Negishi, the latter of which Tsuchihashi was intrigued by after he coincidentally came upon a photo of the location. For the lighting of Lost in Shadow, he tried to recreate the horizontal incidence of sunlight while playing shadow tag, and the muted color palette used in the title was inspired by ancient Japanese art. The enemies in the levels were made to convey a sense of fear and sadness, and were thought of as "it", the current chaser in a game of tag.

The shadow protagonist of the story was left unnamed because Tsuchihashi did not want to over-characterize it. Similarly, chief designer Masakazu Echigo kept its shape fairly simple not to obscure it on the various surfaces it is cast on, and sound director Shohei Bando was faced with the challenge of creating sounds a shadow would make. The health system of the game, centered around the weight of the shadow, was based on Duncan MacDougall's alleged determination of the human soul weighing 21 grams. Hiromasa Ogura, who is a character designer of director Hayao Miyazaki's Studio Ghibli and had previously worked on the anime films Patlabor: The Movie and Ghost in the Shell, was commissioned as the art director for the game and drew the Japanese box cover, as part of a team of seven graphic artists. The music composed by Takasi Watanabe is mostly ambient in nature, and is supplemented by the image song "Hinagiku" from artist Gutevolk. The team conceived the easier puzzles in the game with a computer program, though actual toy blocks were used to model more complex ones, resulting in a lot of trial and error. However, most of the development time of one and a half years was spent on creating and adjusting the shadow engine which posed many unforeseen problems for the game's programmers.

Initially, the game's English working title was Tower of Shadow, but it was renamed.

== Reception ==
Reception

Aggregate scores
Aggregator	Score
GameRankings	69%
Metacritic	68/100

Review scores
Publication	Score
Eurogamer	5/10
IGN	8.5/10
Nintendo Power	8/10
VideoGamer.com	6/10
MSN	5/5
Impulse Gamer	8.7/10

Lost in Shadow received "mixed or average" reviews, according to review aggregator website Metacritic.

Writing for MSN, Kristan Reed praised the game as "an outside bet for Game of the Year", with his only criticisms being the difficulty level and lack of anti-aliasing. Eurogamer called the game "as insubstantial as its hero.", lamenting that "it's no longer enough to simply come up with a concept and let it do the heavy lifting for the entire length of a game."
