= Soldier Blade =

1992 video game

- North American cover art
- Developer: Hudson Soft
- Publisher: Hudson Soft
- Designer: Uriko Uribo
- Composers: Keita Hoshi; Makiko Tanifuji
- Series: Star Soldier
- Platform: TurboGrafx-16
- Release: JP: July 10, 1992; NA: September 1992
- Genre: Scrolling shooter
- Mode: Single-player

Soldier Blade (Note: Japanese: ソルジャーブレイド, Hepburn: Sorujā Bureido) is a 1992 vertically scrolling shooter developed and published by Hudson Soft for the TurboGrafx-16. Controlling the titular starship, the player is tasked with completing each of the game's seven stages in order to wipe out the Zeograd Army, an alien race bent on conquering Earth. The game is the fourth entry in the Star Soldier series and shares many similarities with its predecessor Super Star Soldier, with Soldier Blade having a heavy emphasis on speed.

The initial idea for Soldier Blade came from Hudson designer Uriko Uribo's conversations with other employees over which game to use for the company's upcoming Caravan video game tournament. With the event only six months away, Uribo was hesitant to begin production, however executives from Hudson pushed for him to go forward with the idea. Miscommunication between Uribo and staff lead to several mechanics being altered or changed by mistake, such as several stronger enemies instead being easy to kill.

Although the game was rushed to meet its deadline, critics liked its gameplay, visuals and power-up system, though some thought it lacked originality and felt inferior to Hudson's previous shooters for the system: Blazing Lazers and Final Soldier. Retrospective reviews were much more positive, with some labeling it one of the TurboGrafx-16's definitive shooter games for its fast-paced gameplay and easy learning curve.

== Gameplay ==
The player exchanges shots with the first stage boss.

Soldier Blade is a vertical-scrolling shooter video game, and the fourth in Hudson's successful Star Soldier series. The player assumes the role of the titular starship, which must complete each of the game's seven stages (referred to as "operations" in-game) in an effort to wipe out the Zeograd Army, an alien race bent on conquering Earth. Gameplay is often compared to its predecessor Super Star Soldier, sharing many of its gameplay elements and mechanics, but with a heavy emphasis on speed.

The Soldier Blade begins the game with a standard "Vulcan" projectile, which can destroy most enemies with a single shot, and can collect other weapons by acquiring different colored power capsules; these include a wave gun and a deadly laser that wipes out anything in its path. Collecting a power capsule will also cause a pod-like craft to join the player, which provides additional firepower. The Soldier Blade can be destroyed by colliding with either an enemy or a projectile; by collecting up to three power capsules, the player can take up to three hits. The player can also store three power-up items in a storage box placed towards the bottom of the screen, which can be deployed at any time. Weapons can also be destroyed to give the player a devastating screen-clearing superweapon, which can wipe out all enemies on the screen. A miniboss will need to be fought towards the middle of the stage, followed by an actual boss at the end. Bosses can be destroyed by shooting at its weak point.

Akin to other games in the series, Soldier Blade has two "Caravan" time attack modes, a two-minute version and a five-minute version. In both of these, the player is tasked with scoring as many points before the time runs out. Completing the main game will give the player access to a stage select, allowing them to play whichever area they choose.

== Development ==
Soldier Blade was originally titled Sonic Blaster F-92, which had to be changed due to trademark issues.

The initial idea for Soldier Blade was conceived by Hudson Soft designer Ukiuki Uribo, during conversations with others about which game to use for the company's upcoming Caravan video game tournament. Hikaru Aoyama suggested creating a new shooting game with the tournament in mind; Uribo was hesitant to begin working on it due to it being around six months away, but Hudson executives pushed for the idea to go forth anyway. During early stages of production Uribo was simultaneously working on several Game Boy titles, which gave him less time to focus on the new game until these were completed. Planning for the project was known to be constantly under pressure via time and memory constraints, with employees simply throwing in ideas on the spot and creating the game as they went. It was originally called Sonic Blaster F-92 in early versions, named after the player's ship designed by artist Tatsuya Doe, however trademark issues caused it to be renamed Soldier Blade instead. It began development on a 6-megabit HuCard, reduced to a 4-megabit one later on.

Uribo originally wanted enemy sprites to have more diversity and variety, which due to memory limitations had to be cut. Miscommunication between Uribo and the rest of the development team within the planning documents caused some elements of the game to be altered by mistake, such as the large "Bay Wolf" battleships in the first stage being near-defenseless and easy kills and the "missile pod" enemies in the sixth stage to fire a simple spread shot instead of homing missiles. The development team were interested in including an asteroid belt stage with diagonal scrolling and enemies using the asteroids as shields, however time and hardware constraints forced it to be scrapped. Composers Keita Hoshi and Makiko Tanifuji composed the music. Per Uribo's request, Keita Hoshi created a medley theme featuring music from each stage of the game to be played at the end credits. Atsushi Kakutani designed the Caravan Mode almost entirely alone, although Uribo provided some minor assistance. The cover art was created by Yuji Kaida, a famed Japanese illustrator known for producing art for series such as Godzilla, Ultraman and Macross.

== Release ==
Soldier Blade was released for the PC Engine in Japan on July 10, 1992. It was released in North America for the TurboGrafx-16 two months later in September. Uribo wished that he and the development team had more time to correct and refine many of its mechanics and features, but the time constraints forced them to release it in its current stage. After its release Uribo began drafts for a potential Soldier Blade II, an idea that was never fulfilled. For their Caravan tournament, Hudson produced a modified version of the game called Soldier Blade Special Version, which only features the two Caravan time attack modes. It was produced in very limited quantities, and typically commands high prices on online auction sites.

Soldier Blade was digitally re-released for the Wii Virtual Console worldwide in January 2007. It is included in the 2008 PlayStation Portable compilation Soldier Collection alongside its predecessors Super Star Soldier, Final Soldier and Star Parodier. It was re-released for the PlayStation Network service on February 17, 2010 in Japan under the Game Archives brand. A digital version for the Wii U Virtual Console was released in 2014.

== Reception ==
Reception

Review scores
Publication	Score
Electronic Gaming Monthly	7/10, 7/10, 7/10, 6/10
Eurogamer	7/10
Famitsu	8/10, 7/10, 7/10, 5/10
GameFan	80%, 88%
GameSpot	7.2/10
IGN	7.5/10
Nintendo Life	9/10
Player One	40%

The original TurboGrafx-16 version of Soldier Blade was met with a mixed response from critics. GameFan compared the game favorably to Hudson's own Blazing Lazers, while Famitsu said it was one of the better shooters released for the console. One reviewer from Electronic Gaming Monthly labeled it "a hastily crafted title to herald the coming of the soon-to-be-released TurboDuo", but other reviewers from the magazine were more positive, despite noting the game's lack of originality. Reviews were mixed on the gameplay. The reviewers from Electronic Gaming Monthly rated it from average to very good. GameFan greatly applauded it for its originality and fast-paced action. Famitsu said that while the gameplay was enjoyable, it was not as refined as Hudson's earlier shooters for the systems. Player One magazine found it not well-designed and too easy, feeling it was disappointing compared to Final Soldier. Many praised the graphics for being detailed and colorful, with Player One adding that was one of the game's defining features.

The Wii Virtual Console version garnered a more positive response. Eurogamer said it was "twitch gaming in its purest, most basic form", while Nintendo Life called it "one of the most respected games for the system". IGN found it to be an excellent addition to the Wii Virtual Console library, saying that it stuck out from most shooters available for the service. The gameplay itself was praised by many, with GameSpot applauding its easy learning curve and IGN liking its fast pace, saying it had some of the best on the TurboGrafx-16 as a whole. Eurogamer claimed it to be the fastest shooter on the system and for its gameplay being "surprisingly easy". Several praised the game's graphics, visual effects and soundtrack. Nintendo Life said that it added a "timeless quality" to it, with GameSpot and IGN commending the graphics for being colorful and detailed. GameSpot also liked the game's visual effects for being impressive and well-made. Many publications greatly appreciated the power-up system for being unique and fun to use, with GameSpot in particular liking its flexibility and for being easy to understand.
