= List of PicoPico games =

There are currently 84 PicoPico games by the Japanese game company D4 Enterprise on this list, 6 of which are no longer available.

== Games ==
Title	Release date	Original platform	Original rightsholder	Ref.
Championship Bowling	October 16, 2020	Famicom	Athena	
De-Block	October 16, 2020	Famicom	Athena	
Family Block	October 16, 2020	Famicom	Athena	
Sword Master	October 16, 2020	Famicom	Athena	
Wit's	October 16, 2020	Famicom	Athena	
8-bit Rhythm Land	October 16, 2020	Famicom	Columbus Circle	
Neo Heiankyo Alien	October 16, 2020	Famicom	Columbus Circle	
B-Wings	October 16, 2020	Famicom	Data East	
BurgerTime	October 16, 2020	Famicom	Data East	
Heavy Barrel	October 16, 2020	Famicom	Data East	
World Grand Prix: Pole to Finish	October 16, 2020	Famicom	Data East	
Introduction to Go	October 16, 2020	Famicom	I'MAX	
Shogi Ryuo Battle	October 16, 2020	Famicom	I'MAX	
Argus	October 16, 2020	Famicom	Jaleco	
City Connection	October 16, 2020	Famicom	Jaleco	
Exerion	October 16, 2020	Famicom	Jaleco	
Field Combat	October 16, 2020	Famicom	Jaleco	
Ninja JaJaMaru-kun	October 16, 2020	Famicom	Jaleco	
Battletoads	October 16, 2020	Famicom	Masaya Games	
~~Battle City~~ (delisted)	October 16, 2020	Famicom	Namco	
~~Dragon Buster~~ (delisted)	October 16, 2020	Famicom	Namco	
~~Pac-Man~~ (delisted)	October 16, 2020	Famicom	Namco	
~~Xevious~~ (delisted)	October 16, 2020	Famicom	Namco	
Battle Marine	October 16, 2020	Famicom	Suzuki Plan	
Cosmic Shooter	October 16, 2020	Famicom	Suzuki Plan	
Daiva Story 6: Imperial of Nirsartia	October 16, 2020	Famicom	T&E Soft	
Hydlide Special	October 16, 2020	Famicom	T&E Soft	
Snow Bros.	October 16, 2020	Famicom	Toaplan	
Spelunker	October 16, 2020	Famicom	Tozai Games	
Zanac (overseas version)	October 16, 2020	NES	Compile	
Dragon Unit	November 13, 2020	Famicom	Athena	
Family Quiz: 4-nin wa Rival	November 13, 2020	Famicom	Athena	
Dark Lord	November 13, 2020	Famicom	Data East	
Double Moon Densetsu	November 13, 2020	Famicom	Masaya Games	
~~The Tower of Druaga~~ (delisted)	November 13, 2020	Famicom	Namco	
Buggy Popper	December 14, 2020	Famicom	Data East	
Hoshi wo Miro Hito	December 14, 2020	Famicom	HOT-B	
Formation Z	December 14, 2020	Famicom	Jaleco	
JaJaMaru no Daibouken	December 14, 2020	Famicom	Jaleco	
~~Aero-Cross~~ (delisted)	December 14, 2020	Famicom	Namco	
Pipeline Daisakusen (Note: Originally released as Gorby no Pipeline Daisakusen. The PicoPico re-release changed the title, altered game content and censored the cartridge art to remove all references to former Soviet leader Mikhail Gorbachev)	January 18, 2021	Famicom	Compile	
Daikaiju Deburasu	January 18, 2021	Famicom	Data East	
Golf Club: Birdie Rush	January 18, 2021	Famicom	Data East	
Little Magic	January 18, 2021	Famicom	Data East	
Soccer League - Winner's Cup	January 18, 2021	Famicom	Data East	
Madō Monogatari I: Mittsu no Madō-kyū	February 15, 2021	Game Gear	Compile	
Madō Monogatari II: Arle 16-Sai	February 15, 2021	Game Gear	Compile	
Madō Monogatari III: Kyūkyoku Joō-sama	February 15, 2021	Game Gear	Compile	
Relics	February 15, 2021	MSX	Bothtec, Inc.	
Guardic	February 15, 2021	MSX	Compile	
Madō Monogatari A: Dokidoki Vacation	March 22, 2021	Game Gear	Compile	
Gulkave	March 22, 2021	MSX	Compile	
Maou Golvellius	March 22, 2021	MSX	Compile	
Zanac	March 22, 2021	MSX	Compile	
Pyramid Warp	March 22, 2021	MSX	T&E Soft	
Dragon Slayer IV: Drasle Family	April 12, 2021	MSX	Nihon Falcom	
Romancia	April 12, 2021	MSX	Nihon Falcom	
Xanadu: Dragon Slayer II	April 12, 2021	MSX	Nihon Falcom	
American Truck	April 12, 2021	MSX	Nihon Telenet	
Final Zone Wolf	April 12, 2021	MSX	Nihon Telenet	
Aquapolis SOS	April 29, 2021	MSX	Compile	
Bee & Flower	April 29, 2021	MSX	Compile	
Devil's Heaven	April 29, 2021	MSX	Compile	
Megalopolis SOS	April 29, 2021	MSX	Compile	
Karnov	May 26, 2021	Famicom	Data East	
Tōjin Makyō Den: Heracles no Eikō	June 2, 2021	Famicom	Data East	
Heracles no Eikou II: Titan no Metsubou	June 9, 2021	Famicom	Data East	
Aramo	June 16, 2021	MSX	Creative Brain	
Tritorn	June 23, 2021	MSX	Creative Brain	
Future	June 30, 2021	MSX	Creative Brain	
Hydlide	July 7, 2021	MSX	T&E Soft	
Battleship Clapton II	July 14, 2021	MSX	T&E Soft	
Seal of the Dark Lord	August 13, 2021	MSX	Kogado Studio	
Psychic War: Cosmic Soldier 2	August 19, 2021	MSX	Kogado Studio	
Yokai Detective Chima Chima	August 26, 2021	MSX	Bothtec, Inc.	
Final Justice	September 1, 2021	MSX	Compile	
Crusader	September 8, 2021	MSX	Compile	
Deep Dungeon: Madō Senki	September 30, 2021	MSX	HummingBirdSoft	
Anty	October 6, 2021	MSX	Bothtec, Inc.	
Topple Zip	October 13, 2021	MSX	Bothtec, Inc.	
Borfes and the Five Demons	November 10, 2021	MSX	Xtalsoft	
Märchen Veil	November 17, 2021	MSX	System Sacom	
Courageous Perseus	December 8, 2021	MSX	Cosmos Computer	
C-So!	August 30, 2022	MSX	Compile	

== See also ==
- List of Project EGG games
- List of EGGY games
- Lists of Virtual Console games
- Nintendo Classics
- List of Arcade Archives games
- List of G-Mode Archives games
