= Gunhed =

Gunhed may refer to:

- Gunhed (film), a 1989 Japanese film
  - Gunhed is a fictional giant robot, whose name is an acronym that stands for "Gun Unit Heavy Elimination Device".
- Media adaptations of Gunhed
  - The manga adaptation of the film by Kia Asamiya
  - Gunhed (video game), a shooting game developed by Compile in 1989 for the PC Engine (known as Blazing Lazers in the West)
  - Gunhed: The New Battle, released for the Famicom (Nintendo Entertainment System) in 1990
