= Takahashi Meijin =

Japanese businessman

- 高橋名人
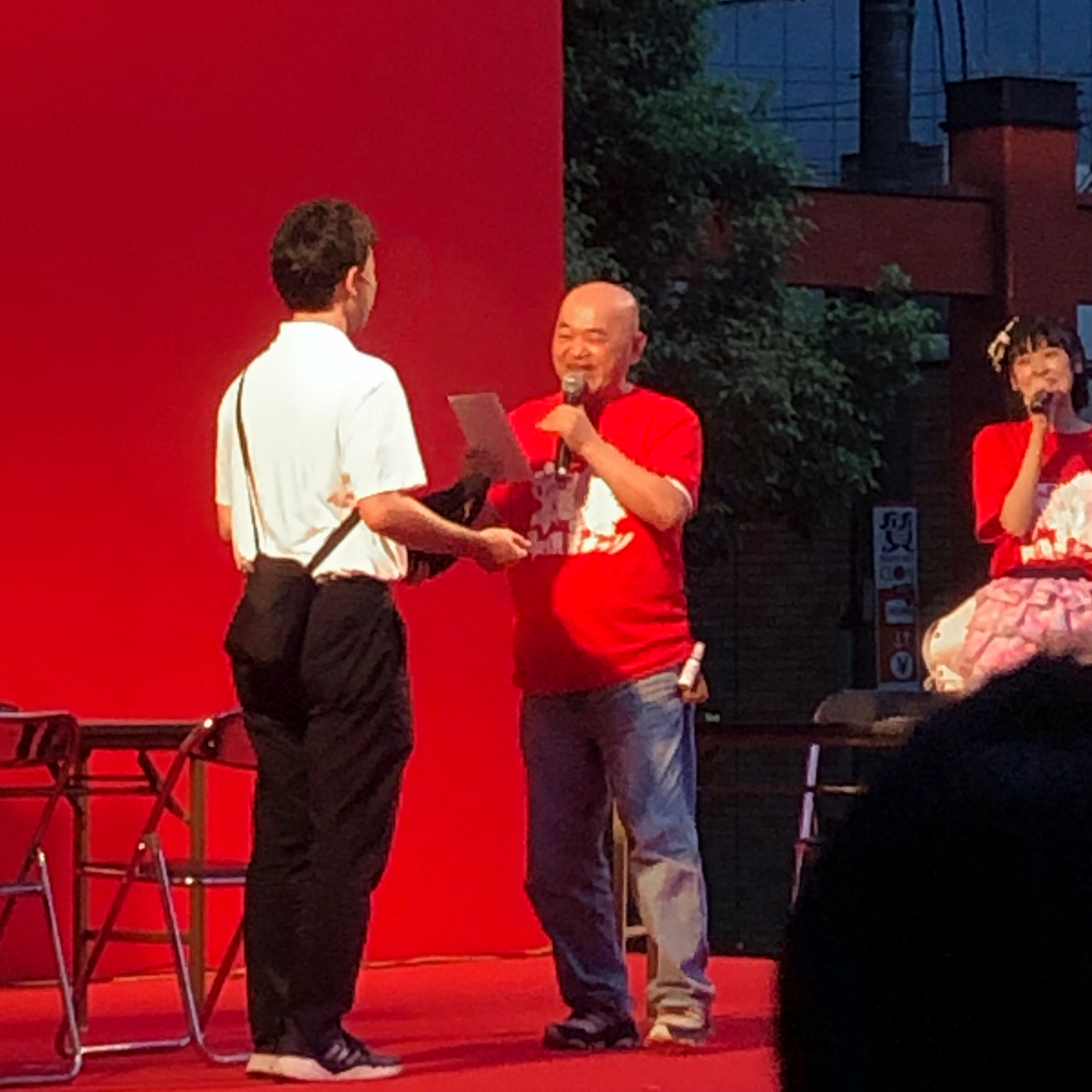
- appearance at the "Osu Puyo Puyo eSports Tournament" 2022
- Born: Toshiyuki Takahashi; May 23, 1959 (age 67); Sapporo, Hokkaidō, Japan
- Occupation: Executive
- Known for: Fast trigger finger speed of 16 shots per second

Takahashi Meijin (高橋名人; literally Master Takahashi), real name Toshiyuki Takahashi (高橋 利幸, Takahashi Toshiyuki; born May 23, 1959 in Sapporo, Hokkaidō), is a former executive of Hudson Soft.

== Biography ==
=== Joining Hudson Soft ===
While Toshiyuki Takahashi worked at a supermarket, he decided to invest in a Sharp brand computer. Since the investment was substantial, Toshiyuki decided to learn programming with the BASIC language. At the same time, a friend of his was interviewed at Hudson Soft and invited him to come. The CEO recruited Toshiyuki for his "energy".

=== Career at Hudson soft ===
Toshiyuki Takahashi was primarily employed to sell computer software to resellers. He helped programmers with his programming skills after finishing his workday. After a year, he transferred to the marketing division. He convinced resellers to market Hudson Soft's first game for the Famicom: Lode Runner. Due to the success of his support, he became responsible for writing a book to learn BASIC with Family BASIC.

Thereafter he ran a section devoted to the Famicom and tips related to Hudson Soft games in the CoroCoro Comic. Following the success of this column, the Shogakukan publishing house ceded stage time to the presentation of Championship Lode Runner at a festival. Toshiyuki Takahashi was appointed to present the game, and practiced to know the game by heart. It was very popular with the public (mainly made up of children).

This success pushed Hudson Soft to organize tournaments dedicated to young audiences on the company's video games, the Hudson Caravan.

=== Gaining popularity ===
In August 1985, Toshiyuki Takahashi joined the Ohayō Studio team in which he presented games from Hudson Soft once a week. The show was watched by many middle school students and Toshiyuki Takahashi gained much popularity. The same year the first Hudson Caravans were organized. These were tournaments organized in several Japanese cities in which 250 young people attempt to achieve the best score. These tournaments were presented by Toshiyuki Takahashi and he used the nickname Takahashi Meijin. The popularity of Takahashi kept growing, and many derivative products emerged, such as an anime (with Bug-tte Honey), in manga, in film (in GAME KING) and in video games (with Adventure Island and Takahashi Meijin no Bug-tte Honey).

=== 2000s ===
In 1999, Toshiyuki Takahashi transferred to a new branch of Hudson Soft dedicated to card games, Future Bee Cards. In 2003, he was appointed communication manager and in 2006, he was awarded the title of Meijin by his company.

On May 31, 2011, he left Hudson and joined Getcha Communications on June 1, 2011. He cited the disappearance of consumer games from Hudson's operations as the reason for his departure from Hudson. After negotiations with Hudson, he was allowed to continue to use the name "Takahashi Meijin".

== 16 shots per second ==
Takahashi became famous for his fast trigger finger speed of 16 shots per second during the 1980s and is particularly known for his use of this skill in the game Star Soldier and the Family Computer version of Star Force. In an interview with Katsuhiro Harada, the producer of the Tekken series, he revealed that his trigger finger speed was actually filmed and counted to be 17 shots per second, but he rounded down to 16 because it had a "computer sound" to it.

Later on in his life, his trigger speed was reduced to 130 presses per ten seconds. In the 2005-12-8 edition of Yaguchihitori show, he was only able to fire 12 shots per second. During the Star Soldier R challenge event in 2008-3-28, he fired at 12.3 shots per second.

In various fiction featuring Takahashi Meijin, the "16 shots per second" milestone became a key plot element.

The Mario Party 4 mini-game "Domination" is loosely based on Takahashi's trigger speed.

== Appearances ==
=== Video games ===
Takahashi appeared as a character in Hudson Soft's Hudson's Adventure Island series. In the Western localization of the games, Takahashi's character was renamed "Master Higgins". In Wonder Boy Returns, the character's name is just called "Boy".

- Bug-tte Honey
- Saturn Bomberman
- DreamMix TV World Fighters
- Fairy Tail Gekitotsu! Kardia Daiseidō

The Adventure Island series was also adapted into an animated series titled Bug-tte Honey, featuring the character under the name Takahashi Genjin.

Guest starring roles in civilian form include:

- Quiz Derby
- GameCenter CX
- Pop Jam
- Yaguchihitori
- Culture SHOwQ
- Hyperdimension Neptunia Mk2 (Live action)
- Tetris Party Deluxe
- Marble Saga: Kororinpa

=== Anime ===
- Running Boy Star Soldier no Himitsu
- Bug-tte Honey
- Gintama Episode 98
- Btooom! (Takanohashi)
- Barakamon Episode 4

=== Film ===
- Game King Takahashi Meijin vs Mouri Meijin

=== Advertisement ===
- Hudson Soft: Shooting Watch
- Meiji Seika: Falcon High Score and Falcon Impulse ads
- Moonstar Shoes
- Sharp: Twin Famicom
