= Starship Hector =

1987 video game

- North American cover art
- Developer(s): Hudson Soft
- Publisher(s): Hudson Soft
- Composer(s): Takeaki Kunimoto
- Platform(s): Nintendo Entertainment System
- Release: JP: July 16, 1987; NA: June 1990
- Genre(s): Scrolling shooter
- Mode(s): Single-player

Starship Hector, originally released as Hector '87 (ヘクター'87), is a scrolling shooter developed and published by Hudson Soft for the Nintendo Entertainment System. The game contains both horizontally and vertically scrolling segments. The player's starship has two modes of fire: one to tackle flying enemies and one for ground-based ones.

Starship Hector is a follow-up to Hudson Soft's earlier shooter Star Soldier, itself inspired by Tecmo's Star Force, an arcade game that Hudson had ported to the Famicom in 1985. The background music of Starship Hector was reused as background music in Super Star Soldier. The theme also appears in the Wii game Kororinpa, which itself has many themes from older Hudson Soft games.

The game was released in 1995 for the Super Famicom, along with Star Force and Star Soldier, in the Caravan Shooting Collection released exclusively in Japan.
