= Mickey Mousecapade =

1987 video game

- North American box art
- Developer: Hudson Soft
- Publishers: JP: Hudson Soft; NA: Capcom
- Composer: Takeaki Kunimoto
- Platform: Nintendo Entertainment System
- Release: JP: March 6, 1987; NA: October 1988
- Genre: Platform
- Mode: Single-player

Mickey Mousecapade, released in Japan as Mickey Mouse: Adventures in Wonderland, (Note: Japanese: ミッキーマウス 不思議の国の大冒険, Hepburn: Mickey Mouse: Fushigi no Kuni no Daibouken) is a platform video game based on Disney's Mickey Mouse franchise. It was developed and published by Hudson Soft originally in 1987 for the Family Computer in Japan. Capcom published the game for the Nintendo Entertainment System in the United States in 1988.

== Summary ==
Mickey Mouse in the first stage - the Fun House.

Mickey Mousecapade's gameplay consists of players controlling Mickey Mouse through 2D platforming, while Minnie Mouse follows Mickey and occasionally gets kidnapped.

The game's plot involves Mickey and Minnie traveling through a fun house, an ocean, a forest, a pirate ship, and a castle to rescue Alice from Alice in Wonderland. In the Japanese version, Alice is prominently featured on the box art and instruction manual, but Alice is vaguely referred to as "a friend" in the American version's advertisements and instruction manual, despite her still appearing in the ending cutscene. Various villains from Disney cartoons and animated films appear throughout the game as bosses.

The Japanese and American versions contain a variety of differences from each other, including: enemies, items, weapons, boss characters, and level names.

== Reception ==
Reception

Review score
Publication	Score
AllGame	2/5

Allgame's Skyler Miller described the visuals as serviceable, but the music as overly repetitive. Miller awarded the game two out of five stars. IGN rated it the 86th greatest NES game of all time.

The game sold over one million units.

== See also ==
- List of Disney video games
