= Star Soldier =

- Genre: Scrolling shooter
- Developer: Hudson Soft
- Publisher: Hudson Soft
- Platforms: MSX, NES, TurboGrafx-16, Super Famicom, Nintendo 64, GameCube, Game Boy Advance, Mobile phone, PlayStation Portable, Wii, iOS
- First release: Star Soldier; June 13, 1986
- Latest release: Star Soldier R March 25, 2008
- Spin-offs: Starship Hector; Blazing Lazers; Star Parodier

Star Soldier (Note: Japanese: スターソルジャー, Hepburn: Sutā Sorujā) is a series of scrolling shooters mainly developed by Hudson Soft. Konami has owned the rights to the series since their absorption of Hudson Soft in 2012.

The eponymous first game, Star Soldier, was released in 1986 for the MSX and NES, and lead to a series of sequels that continued on various gaming systems. Star Soldier itself was re-released with little change in the compilation Caravan Shooting Collection for the Super Famicom in 1995, received enhanced remakes for both the GameCube and PlayStation 2 in 2003, and a different remake for the PlayStation Portable in 2005. The Nintendo 64 got an exclusive release called Star Soldier: Vanishing Earth in 1998, while the latest installment of the series was released on the Wii as a WiiWare game in 2008. In addition, the TurboGrafx-16 games Super Star Soldier, Final Soldier, Soldier Blade and Star Parodier have been re-released on the Wii's Virtual Console and on the Japanese PC Engine's Best Collection lineup for the PSP.

The Star Soldier games are best known for their distinctive music, unique weapon power-ups, and a special time attack high score mode called "Caravan Mode".

== Caravan gaming tournaments ==
Star Soldier was developed as a spiritual successor to Tecmo's Star Force, from which it borrows most of its gameplay elements. The Star Force series, along with Hudson's Star Soldier, was often featured in the popular Japanese gaming tournament known as "Hudson All-Japan Caravan Festival". Home ports of Star Soldier games would sometimes feature "Caravan" modes in which the player would race through timed stages while trying to accumulate a high score.

== Common elements ==
Being an arcade-style game, Star Soldier's objective is primarily based on achieving a high score. The series often makes use of hidden destructible tiles that offer bonus points when shot, but may occasionally power-up the player's ship instead. Bonus points will also be awarded for defeating sequences of enemy formations while they are within a certain proximity to the player's ship, or defeating mini bosses before they have a chance to attack.

== Games ==
Release timeline
1986	Star Soldier
1987	Starship Hector
1988
1989
1990	Super Star Soldier
1991	Final Soldier
1992	Soldier Blade
1992	Star Parodier
1993
1994
1995	Caravan Shooting Collection
1996
1997
1998	Star Soldier: Vanishing Earth
1999
2000
2001
2002
2003	Star Soldier (GCN)
2004
2005	Star Soldier (PSP)
2006
2007	Soldier Collection
2008	Star Soldier R

- 1986: Star Soldier - MSX, Famicom/NES, Game Boy Advance, iOS, Wii VC, 3DS VC, Nintendo Online (Switch).
  - Star Soldier Special+ - Mobile Phone
  - Star Soldier SP Arcade - Mobile Phone
  - Star Soldier Fukkoku-Ban - Mobile Phone
- 1990: Super Star Soldier - PC Engine/TurboGrafx-16, Wii VC, Windows Store, Wii U VC
- 1991: Final Soldier - PC Engine, Wii VC, Wii U VC
- 1992: Soldier Blade - PC Engine/TurboGrafx-16, Wii VC, Wii U VC
- 1992: Star Parodier - PC Engine CD ROM, Wii VC
- 1998: Star Soldier: Vanishing Earth - Nintendo 64
- 2008: Star Soldier R - Wii (WiiWare)
- 2010: Star Soldier Mission Mode - Mobile Phone
- 2013: Star Soldier for GREE - iOS

During the Konami Action & Shooting Contest hosted by the Shueisha Game Creator’s Camp and Tokyo Game Show 2022, Beep won the rights from Konami to develop the game through the competition, a game titled Star Soldier RE:VIVE Multiverse is in development.

=== Crossover ===
- 2006: Star Soldier vs DoDonPachi DaiOuJou CARAVAN'06 - Mobile Phone
- 2018: Super Bomberman R - Nintendo Switch
- 2018: Pixel Puzzle Collection - iOS, Android

=== Compilations and remakes ===
- 1995: Caravan Shooting Collection - SNES
  - Compilation of Star Force, Star Soldier and Starship Hector
- 2003: Star Soldier - GameCube, PS2
  - 3D remake with arranged stages
- 2005: Star Soldier - PSP
  - Enhanced port of the 2003 remake
- 2006: Hudson Best Collection Vol. 5: Shooting Collection - GBA
  - Compilation of Star Force, Star Soldier and Starship Hector
- 2008: PC Engine Best Collection: Soldier Collection - PSP
  - Compilation of Super Star Soldier, Final Soldier, Star Parodier and Soldier Blade

=== Canceled games ===
- 1995: Kuma Soldier - PC-FX

== Other media ==
- 1985–1987: Famicom Rocky - manga: Star Soldier is one of the videogames based on the manga.
- 1986-1987: Famicom Cap - manga: Star Soldier is one of the videogames based on the manga.
- 1986–1987: Nekketsu! Famicom Shounendan: Star Soldier is one of the videogames based on the manga.
- 1991–1993: Cyber Boy - manga: Soldier Blade and Star Parodier, two of the video games based on the manga.
- 1986: Running Boy Star Soldier no Himitsu - anime film
