= Marble Man =

Marble Man may refer to:

- Man of Marble, a 1977 Polish film
- Marble Man: Marble Madness II, an unreleased video game
- Robert E. Lee or Marble Man (1807–1870), American and Confederate soldier
- Marble Man, a character on Mighty Man and Yukk

== See also ==
- Kororinpa: Marble Mania, a video game
