= Takeaki Kunimoto =

- 国本 剛章
- Born: January 11, 1962 (age 64); Hokkaido, Japan
- Other names: Kinoko Kunimoto, TAKE-CHAN
- Occupations: Composer, arranger
- Years active: 1985–1989
- Musical career
- Genres: Video game music
- Instruments: Bass, keyboards
- Website: Official website

Takeaki Kunimoto (国本剛章, Kunimoto Takeaki) is a former composer of video game music. He used to work for the Japanese video game developer Hudson Soft. With them he would go on to compose several of their most famous early hits, including Star Soldier, Milon's Secret Castle, Mickey Mousecapade and Robowarrior. In recent years, he has dedicated his time to performing video game music at live venues in the Shibuya area, as well as releasing several albums containing his video game music material.

Kunimoto is noted as one of the first to write accompanying lyrics to the music featured in the video games he composed for, printed in the instruction booklet supplied with the game software.

== Biography ==
Kunimoto began his career after attending college and being scouted by Hudson Soft staff member Sasagawa Toshiyuki who visited the musical instrument store Kunimoto was working at, often coding the pre-composed melodies in keyboard software. Sasagawa assigned him to compose for Challenger on the Famicom. He went on to compose the majority of Hudson Soft's earlier hits. Most of his work was done on the YAMAHA CX-11 (MSX) + SFG-01 module.

In 1987, Kunimoto made the move to Tokyo in order to begin a career as a live musician and session player, and as a result his work on video games slowed down considerably. He was brought in to assist on the soundtracks for Momotaro Densetsu, and also to do work on Hudson's new PC Engine software. In 1990. Kunimoto appeared on the popular TV show "Yuji Miyake's exciting band heaven" on TBS.

As was the standard in the mid-1980s, video game composers were often not credited for their work, and would remain in obscurity. Due to Hudson's increased output of their video game music library in the mid-2000s, as well as acknowledgement from former colleagues on various blogs and interviews, Kunimoto stepped back into the spotlight in 2006 with his own active blog and video game music CD collections. He would go on to form several bands dedicated to performing video game music live in the Shibuya area. His newfound popularity also landed him a publishing deal with record label SuperSweep, with the release of "Takeaki Kunimoto WORKS ~Hitsuji no Oka~" in 2012.

A friend of the late video game composer Ryu Umemoto, Kunimoto has held several memorial concerts as well as partaken in tribute albums for Umemoto, including JADE-II, JADE-IV and WOODSOFT's "Umemoto Was Here" album.

== List of works ==
=== Famicom ===
- Challenger (1985)
- Ninja Hattori Kun (1986)
- Star Soldier (1986)
- Milon's Secret Castle (1986)
- Dino Riki (1987)
- Mickey Mousecapade (1987)
- Takahashi Meijin no Bug-tte Honey (1987)
- Starship Hector (1987)
- Robowarrior (1987)
- Momotaro Densetsu (1987)

=== PC Engine ===
- J.J. & Jeff (1987)
- Victory Run (1987)
- Victory Life (1988)
- Break In (1989)

== Discography ==
=== Albums ===
Year	Album	Notes
1986	"Hudson Game Music" (ハドソン・ゲーム・ミュージック)	Featured artist
1986	"Star Soldier (Arrange Version)" (スターソルジャー（アレンジ・バージョン）)	
2006	"20th Century Famicom Boy" (２０世紀ファミコン少年)	Collection of Famicom works
2006	"PC Engine" (PC園児)	Collection of PC Engine works
2007	"Hudson Premium Audio Collection"	Featured artist
2007	"TAKE-CHAN & KEN-CHAN HAPPY CD" (タケちゃん＆健ちゃん ごきげんCD)	Arrangement album featuring Ken Matsuzawa and Akira Hagiwara
2012	"Takeaki Kunimoto WORKS ~Hitsuji no Oka~" (国本剛章WORKS～ひつじの丘～)	Studio album featuring new original works and arrangement of video game works.
2014	"1" (１ オール１ブラザーズ)	Studio album featuring original works with Tendō(guitar & vocals)
