= James Thompson (judoka) =

American judoka

Medal record

Men's Judo

US National Championships
Gold medal – first place	Gold	1995

US Olympic Trials
Bronze medal – third place	Bronze	1996

James "Brewster" Thompson is a former judoka competitor. James was an Olympic alternate for the US team in 1984.

== Personal life ==
While Brewster Thompson was on his high school basketball team, his coach made him learn to jump rope. Brewster would become well known for his jump roping ability and is an advocate of a drug free life style.

Brewster allegedly had a fight with Dave Camarillo in a BJJ academy in which his arm was broken. During this altercation Brewster picked up Dave and proceeded to throw him onto the pavement of the street (with a broken arm) but was stopped by the members of the BJJ academy.

== Judo ==
Brewster competed in the 1981 U.S. National Judo Championships falling to Miguel Tedula. Brewster would compete at the U.S. Olympic judo team trials in 1976, 1980, 1984, 1996, and 2008 (at the age of 55). In 1985, Brewster was US National Champion in the Open weight division. Brewster finished third at the 1986 Olympic festival in judo. Brewster would win Gold in the Masters Heavyweight division in sumo.

== Media ==
Brewster has appeared as an actor in the movies Gunhed (1989), Lionheart (1990) and No Laughing Matter (1998). He has appeared on David Letterman and Arsenio Hall. Brewster has been the subject of multiple articles including Jet Magazine and Black Belt Magazine.
