= Sigma Star Saga =

2005 video game

- North American cover art
- Developer: WayForward
- Publishers: Namco Hometek (NA); Atari (EU); WayForward (DX)
- Director: Matt Bozon
- Producers: Matt Bozon; Philip Cohen
- Designers: Matt Bozon; Hwang Nguyen; Greg Weller
- Artists: Jeremy Dower; Vuduberi
- Writer: Matt Bozon
- Composer: Martin Schioeler
- Platforms: Game Boy Advance, PlayStation 5, Nintendo Switch, Windows
- Release: Game Boy Advance: NA: August 16, 2005; EU: June 23, 2006; WW: March 2026 (DX); PlayStation 5, Nintendo Switch, Windows: WW: April 7, 2026
- Genres: Action role-playing, shoot 'em up
- Mode: Single-player

Sigma Star Saga is a 2005 hybrid action role-playing shoot 'em up developed by WayForward and published by Namco Hometek for the Game Boy Advance. The game alternates between top-down overworld exploration and side-scrolling space combat, following human pilot Ian Recker as he infiltrates the alien Krill empire. An updated remaster, Sigma Star Saga DX, was released in April 2026 for modern consoles and PC.

== Gameplay ==
Sigma Star Saga is defined by its unique gameplay loop, which is divided into two distinct but interconnected phases: overworld exploration and arcade-style ship combat.

=== Overworld ===
In the overworld, players control Recker directly from a top-down perspective. The primary objectives involve navigating various planets, interacting with non-player characters to advance the narrative, and searching for hidden items and "Gun Data". As Recker explores, he acquires new weapons to combat local flora and fauna, alongside environmental power-ups that grant access to previously unreachable areas and barriers.

=== Ship Battles ===
Combat is initiated through random encounters that seamlessly transport the player into space to pilot the biological ships of the alien Krill fleet. Unlike traditional shoot 'em ups that feature a fixed vessel, Sigma Star Saga randomly assigns the player one of several ship classes during battles, ranging from agile fighters to heavy bombers and cumbersome cargo vessels. The objective typically involves destroying a set quota of enemy targets to conclude the encounter.

The role-playing elements are deeply integrated into these space battles. Defeating enemies yields experience bubbles that enhance the ship's offensive and defensive statistics. Furthermore, the "Gun Data" system allows for extensive weapon customization. Players can modify three distinct firing parameters: the "cannon" (altering fire direction and rate), the "bullet" (changing projectile size and range), and the "impact" (dictating status effects or explosions upon hitting a target). With dozens of data fragments discoverable in the overworld, the original system boasts 15,680 potential weapon combinations. The DX remaster later expanded this to over 70 Gun Data items, yielding over 20,000 combinations.

== Plot ==
The narrative centers on Ian Recker, a decorated human pilot who goes undercover to infiltrate the Krill, an alien species responsible for a devastating attack on Earth. The Krill's initial assault involved excavating a massive, Canada-sized crater beneath the Atlantic Ocean, causing the oceans to boil and nearly rendering the planet uninhabitable.

To aid his infiltration, Recker is "captured" and outfitted with a Krill parasite suit, which augments his physical capabilities and grants him the neural link required to pilot their biological starships. He soon becomes entangled in an interstellar race across multiple planets to secure control over a mysterious "bio-matter" located within planetary cores. Following a series of betrayals, Recker discovers that this bio-matter is actually a dormant, monstrous superweapon coveted by both the Krill High Command and his own human superiors. The conflict is further complicated by the introduction of a specialized virus, initially believed to be a biological weapon designed to eradicate the Krill, which is ultimately revealed to be the only means of destroying the bio-matter.

=== Characters ===
The emotional core of the story relies on the tense, shifting dynamics between Recker and his two primary companions: Psyme, a Krill pilot, and Scarlet, a human scientist. Mutual distrust defines their relationship, forcing Recker to constantly balance his undercover allegiance to Psyme with his duty to protect Scarlet. The supporting cast includes various Krill starbase commanders, the enigmatic Krill officer Blune, and Commander Tierney, Recker's human commanding officer—a character named in honor of Adam Tierney, a member of the game's development team.

=== Endings ===
The game features a branching narrative that culminates in four distinct endings, determined by the survival of Psyme and Scarlet during the final chapter. While Psyme can be saved during an initial playthrough, Scarlet's survival is locked behind a "New Game+" cycle, encouraging replayability. Additionally, a secret canonical ending is unlocked if the player manages to save both companions.

== Development ==
Sigma Star Saga was directed, written, and designed by Matt Bozon at WayForward. The project was originally conceived as a pseudo-sequel to Namco's arcade and PlayStation space combat titles, such as Star Ixiom and Star Luster. Bozon cited The Legend of Zelda, Chrono Trigger, and Disgaea as inspirations for the top-down exploration, while the side-scrolling combat was heavily influenced by Gradius and R-Type. He compared the unusual genre mashup to Zelda II: The Adventure of Link, Gargoyle's Quest, and The Guardian Legend.

During the game's development, WayForward published a series of "Developer Diaries" detailing the technical hurdles of rendering seamless transitions between the top-down overworld and the side-scrolling combat engine without compromising the handheld's limited memory. Testing the game was particularly challenging due to the massive number of custom weapon combinations and the random nature of the ship assignments during skirmishes.

== Release ==
The original Game Boy Advance version of Sigma Star Saga was published in North America by Namco Hometek on August 16, 2005. In Europe, the game was distributed through a publishing partnership between Namco Bandai and Atari, releasing on June 23, 2006.

Following the original release, the rights to the franchise eventually reverted to Bandai Namco. In 2025, WayForward's Adam Tierney spearheaded an effort to resurrect the game with Bandai Namco's approval. On October 29, 2025, WayForward officially announced Sigma Star Saga DX, a definitive remaster developed to coincide with the game's 20th anniversary. Ported by Mighty Rabbit Studios and running on Limited Run Games' Carbon Engine, the DX edition was built to modernize the experience with quality-of-life improvements, bug fixes, and updated visual options.

The remaster was released worldwide on April 7, 2026, for the PlayStation 5, Nintendo Switch, and PC via Steam, priced at $19.99. Enhancements in the DX version include an improved map, decreased random encounter rate, rebalanced EXP system, modified hit boxes, adjusted auto-fire, and additional save points. Modern versions also feature a concept-art gallery, music player, border art options, rewind functionality, and save states. Additionally, a physical Game Boy Advance cartridge release for retro collectors was made available for pre-order in March 2025, with reproduction carts shipping in November 2025. Physical releases of the modern console versions were distributed by Limited Run Games.

== Reception ==
Reception

Aggregate score
Aggregator	Score
Metacritic	68/100

Review scores
Publication	Score
1Up.com	B
Edge	5/10
Game Informer	8.5/10
GamePro	3.5/5
GameSpot	7.2/10
IGN	6/10
Nintendo Power	8.5/10
X-Play	3/5

Sigma Star Saga received "mixed or average" reviews upon its initial release, holding a score of 68 out of 100 on the review aggregator Metacritic. Critics generally praised the game's ambitious genre-blending and the depth of the "Gun Data" customization system, but were divided on the execution of the random encounters and overworld pacing.

Greg Kasavin of GameSpot praised the game's original ideas of blending elements from the shoot 'em up genre with the role-playing genre, noting that the biological ships and deep weapon customization offered a fresh take on the GBA library. However, he noted that the gameplay could become tedious due to frequent backtracking and the interruption of overworld exploration by random space battles. Game Informer and Nintendo Power both awarded the game an 8.5 out of 10, highlighting the charm of the story, the distinct visual styles of the overworld and space combat, and the high replay value offered by the multiple endings and New Game+ mode.

Conversely, IGN gave the game a 6/10, criticizing the repetitive nature of the ship battles and the lack of direct control over ship classes during random encounters. Edge magazine echoed some of these frustrations, scoring the game a 5/10 and feeling that the two distinct gameplay halves did not mesh together as smoothly as intended. Other contemporary reviews were similarly divided; 1UP.com awarded the game a B grade, acknowledging its unique genre-blending while criticizing its repetitive encounters. GamePro, GameSpy, and X-Play offered average assessments, citing the steep learning curve of the Gun Data system. Meanwhile, GameZone and the Detroit Free Press were more critical of the game's pacing and random battle interruptions.

=== DX Remaster Reception ===
Upon its release in April 2026, the DX remaster, like its original counterpart, received "mixed or average" reviews, holding a Metacritic score of 72 out of 100. Reviewers praised the game's unique atmosphere, with one critic comparing its mature, dark tone to Metroid Fusion and Metal Gear Solid: Ghost Babel. A highly positive review awarded it a 90 out of 100, calling it "one of the very best games published by WayForward" and expressing hope for a modern sequel. However, more critical reviews pointed out that the overworld's zoomed-in camera, respawning enemies, and retraversal could become frustrating, while the shoot 'em up segments remained somewhat repetitious despite the reduced encounter rate. Hey Poor Player highlighted that the seamless transition between RPG exploration and shmup combat still felt remarkably unique on modern hardware like the Nintendo Switch.
