= 1chipMSX =

MSX-2 computer by D4 Enterprise

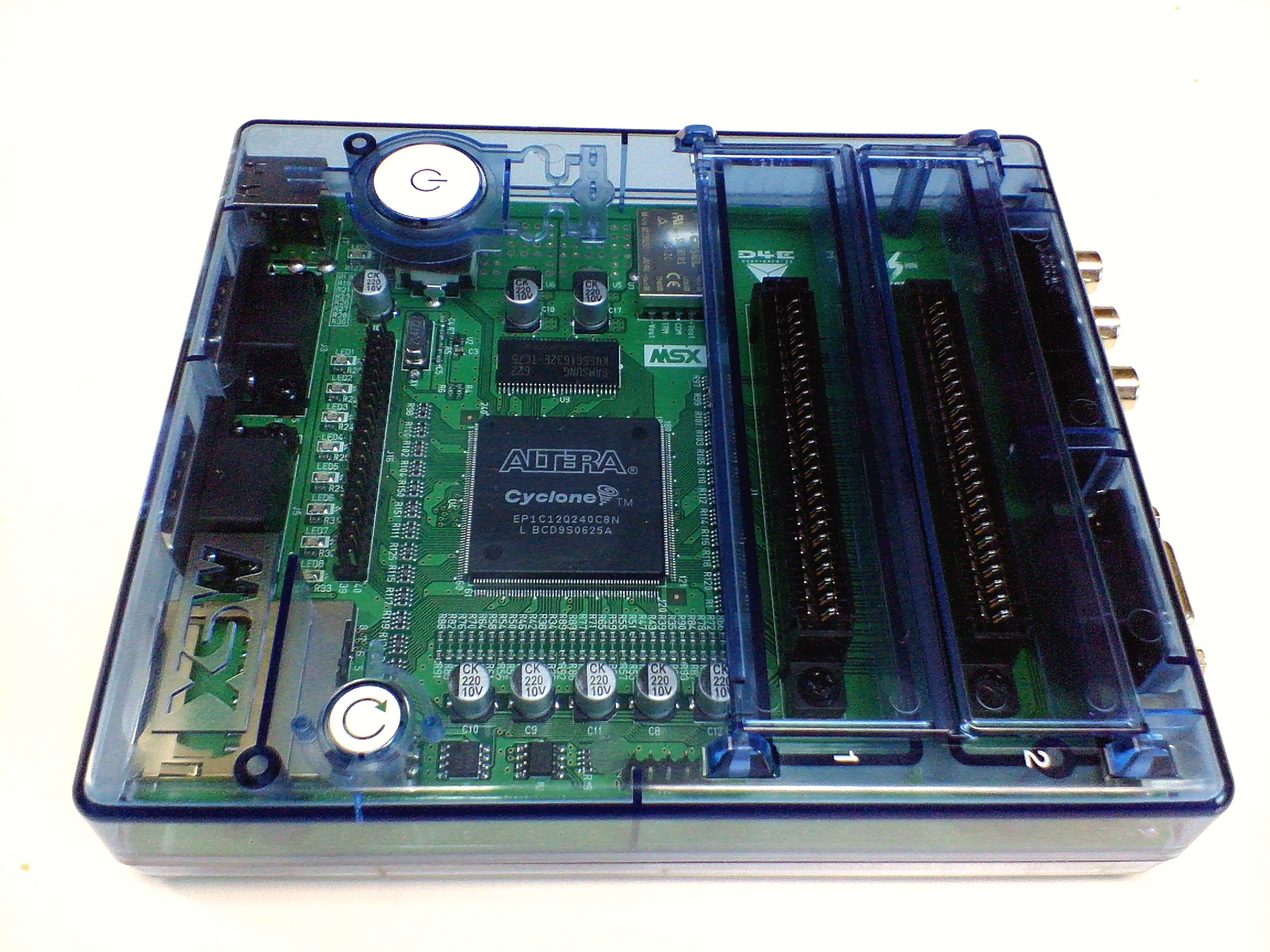
- Type: Home computer
- Released: 2006
- Discontinued: batch 1 completed
- Operating system: MSX-DOS / MSX BASIC
- CPU: Zilog Z80 implemented in VHDL on an FPGA
- Memory: 1 MB

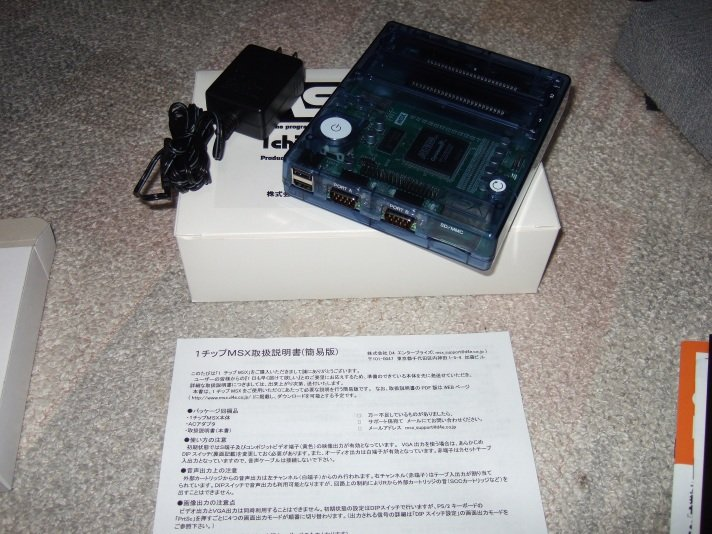
A 1chipMSX displayed with power adapter, instruction manual, and cardboard packaging.

The One chip MSX, or 1chipMSX as the D4 Enterprise distributional name for the ESE MSX System 3, is a re-implementation of an MSX-2 home computer that uses a single FPGA to implement all the electronics (except the RAM) of an MSX-2, including the MSX-MUSIC and SCC+ audio extensions.

The system is housed in a transparent blue plastic box, and can be used with a standard monitor (or TV) and a PC keyboard. Original MSX cartridges can be inserted, as well as SD and MMC memory cards as an external storage medium. Even though it lacks a 3.5" disk drive, disks are supported through emulation on a memory card, including support for booting MSX-DOS. Due to its VHDL programmable hardware, it's possible to give the device new hardware extensions by simply running a reconfiguration program under MSX-DOS. The "one chip-MSX" is equipped with two USB connectors, that can be used after adding some supporting VHDL code.

== Availability ==
The ESE MSX System 3 is designed by ESE Artists' Factory and distributed as 1chipMSX by D4 Enterprise and was supposed to be distributed outside Japan by Bazix. However, due to RoHS regulations in Europe, it was claimed it could not be distributed to Europe in its original form and the European market had to wait for an adapted version which would be produced through Bazix and distributed to Europe by Bazix. However, no violation of RoHS has ever been proven, with all identifiable components of the PCB and power supply being RoHS-compliant. Bazix stopped being the representative of MSX Association and thus did not bring the 1chipMSX to the Western market. In the end, MSX Association was dissolved due to a dispute with other parties involved, resulting in a shift of all intellectual property rights concerning MSX to MSX Licensing Corporation. Bazix also dissolved because this dispute made an end to their efforts and ambitions to bring the 1chipMSX to the Western market (along with other projects that were also dependent on the Japanese partners).

== Hardware specifications ==
- Altera Cyclone EP1C12Q240C8N FPGA chip
- 32 MB SDRAM
- SD/MMC card slot
- 2 MSX Cartridge slots
- 2 audio outputs (for future stereo support)
- S-Video video output
- Composite video output
- VGA video output
- PS/2 keyboard connector
- 2 USB connector
- 2 MSX Joystick ports
- FPGA I/O pin (40 pins and 10 pins)

Also included:

- English-language instruction manual, which includes an introduction to VHDL
- Full VHDL code used to achieve MSX2 compatibility (default configuration)
- CD-ROM with VHDL code examples and the following software:
  - Altera Quartus 2 Web Edition - VHDL development environment
  - PLDLOAD and PLDSAVE - Software to read and program the FPGA chip
  - EP, FDLOAD and FDSAVE - Software to create, load and play disk images
- 220 V adapter or 110 V converter plug
- Schematics to the One Chip MSX PCB
- Blueprint of the One Chip MSX casing

== Specifications ==
Default specifications of the implemented MSX system:

- MSX 2 computer system
- 1 MB RAM
- 128 kB VRAM
- Kanji-ROM
- MSX-MUSIC
- MSX-DOS2 with FAT16 support
- MEGA-SCSI compatible support for SD card as primary drive

== See also ==
- Minimig is a similar FPGA project synthesizing a different home computer's circuitry.
