= Star Soldier R =

2008 video game

- Star Soldier R logo
- Developer: Hudson Soft
- Publisher: Hudson Soft
- Platform: WiiWare
- Release: JP: March 25, 2008; NA: May 19, 2008; EU: May 20, 2008
- Genre: Scrolling shooter
- Mode: Single-player

Star Soldier R (スターソルジャー R, Sutā Sorujā R) is a futuristic scrolling shooter video game developed by Hudson Soft, and is the seventh installment in the Star Soldier series. The game features classic Star Soldier gameplay combined with 3D graphics.

Star Soldier R is one of several video games released exclusively as WiiWare through the Wii Shop Channel. It was released with the Japanese launch of WiiWare on March 25, 2008, in North America on May 19, and in Europe on May 20 with the European launch of WiiWare.

== Gameplay ==
Gameplay in Star Soldier R

Star Soldier R retains classic gameplay features from the Star Soldier series, such as the vertical-scrolling shooter style and three adjustable speeds for the player's ship. Instead of a traditional progressive level structure, the game revolves around time attack-style gameplay, called Caravan mode, with players aiming to score as many points as possible in either two- or five-minute game modes in one of the game's levels. Unlike previous installments in the series, however, there are only two playable levels. Aside from regular scrolling-shooter gameplay, the game also has a Fast Shot mode which measures how quickly the player can press the fire button. The game has two types of primary power-ups, in the form of red and blue capsules. Red power-up capsules enhance the offensive ability of the player's ship, eventually resulting in a five-way shot. Blue power-ups enhance the ship's "Force", a shield that protects the ship from enemy attacks and can be separated from the ship to attack enemies.

== Reception ==
Reception

Aggregate score
Aggregator	Score
Metacritic	64/100

Review scores
Publication	Score
1Up.com	B−
Eurogamer	5/10
GameDaily	7/10
GameSpot	7/10
IGN	6/10
Jeuxvideo.com	8/20
Nintendo Life	7/10
Nintendo World Report	7/10
Official Nintendo Magazine	72%
Retro Gamer	89%

The game received "mixed" reviews according to the review aggregation website Metacritic. IGN lauded the quality of the game's core design and top-down shooter gameplay, but criticized the time limitations and repetition with the levels as "thin and ultimately cheap for most gamers". 1Up.com praised the game as "fun and addictive", but noted that the price of 800 Wii points may be somewhat high for the casual gamer to accept. GameSpot also criticized the game for being too short, but described the gameplay as addictive and supported by an excellent control scheme. Eurogamer noted the game as targeting a narrow niche among gamers, saying that the game was more oriented to high-score seekers than a casual audience. GamePro said, "Some may not appreciate Star Soldier R's replay-intensive gameplay, and may view the game as something that can be seen in its entirety in less than ten minutes. It's a fun ten minutes, though, and assuming you're willing to accept it for what it is, your Wii Points will be well-spent." (Note: GamePro gave the game 4/5 for graphics, two 3.5/5 scores for sound and fun factor, and 5/5 for control.)

== See also ==
- List of WiiWare games
- Star Soldier series
