= The Guardian Legend =

1988 video game

- North American NES cover art
- Developer: Compile
- Publishers: JP: Irem; NA: Broderbund; EU: Nintendo
- Director: Masamitsu Niitani
- Programmer: Takayuki Hirono
- Artist: Koji Teramoto
- Composers: Masatomo Miyamoto; Takeshi Santo
- Platform: NES
- Release: JP: February 5, 1988; NA: April 1989; EU: 1991
- Genres: Action-adventure, scrolling shooter
- Mode: Single-player

The Guardian Legend (Note: Known in Japan as Guardic Gaiden (Japanese: ガーディック外伝(がいでん), Hepburn: Gādikku Gaiden)) is a 1988 hybrid action-adventure and shoot 'em up video game developed by Compile for the Nintendo Entertainment System (NES). It is the sequel to the 1986 MSX game Guardic, and was published and released in Japan by Irem in 1988, in North America by Broderbund in 1989, and in Europe by Nintendo in 1991.

It incorporates gameplay elements from other games such as The Legend of Zelda, Metroid, and 1942. In the game, the player controls a lone protagonist, the Guardian, who is on a quest to destroy a large alien-infested world named Naju before it reaches the planet Earth. The player must deactivate ten safety devices scattered throughout Naju, thus activating the alien world's self-destruct sequence. The player explores Naju in a non-linear fashion and can acquire different weapons during the course of the game.

The Guardian Legend received mixed reviews from magazines such as Electronic Gaming Monthly and Nintendo Power. While it has been praised for its impressive graphics, memorable sound, and responsive controls, it has been criticized for its repetitive gameplay and complicated password system. It has since been considered a classic example of a multiple-genre game that set a standard for others such as Sigma Star Saga.

== Gameplay ==
Gameplay varies depending on the player's location within Naju. The player controls the Guardian in humanoid form when exploring the surface of Naju (the Labyrinth) and in spaceship form when investigating Naju's interior (the Dungeon). The Guardian has a life meter that decreases after sustaining damage from enemies; it can be replenished by collecting various items. If the life meter runs out, the Guardian explodes, and the game ends. The player can use a primary rapid-fire weapon with unlimited ammunition as well as various powerful secondary weapons that consume "power chips" with each use. Power chips are also used as currency to purchase upgrades for the Guardian in a handful of shops throughout Naju. Found within the Labyrinth or obtained after defeating a boss, these upgrades include primary weapon improvements, new or upgraded secondary weapons, and round, brightly colored creatures called Landers.

Blue and Red Landers, recurring characters in many Compile games, increase the player's maximum life and power chip capacities, respectively. (Note: The original Japanese name for the Lander creatures is ランダー (Randā). The names of similar items in Guardic and the NES version of Zanac are romanized as "Randar" and "Render", respectively.) Blue Landers play multiple roles in The Guardian Legend. Some of them are not items but non-player characters that dispense advice to the player or exchange upgrades for power chips; others provide a password that allows the player to resume the game at a later time with their progress retained. These Blue Landers also serve as checkpoints; players can restart their game in these designated rooms after being defeated provided the system has not been turned off.

The Guardian Legend features both action-adventure gameplay (top) and shoot 'em up gameplay (bottom).

In the action-adventure portion of the game known as the "Labyrinth", the player explores the surface of Naju in humanoid form in a top-down perspective. The player must navigate the Labyrinth and find and infiltrate the corridors and ultimately activate Naju's ten safety devices. The Labyrinth consists of screen-wide passages and rooms individually plotted as X–Y coordinates. A map that details these coordinates in a grid-like form can be viewed on the pause subscreen. While the player can generally walk from one screen to the next, some screens are separated by portals called "warp panels". Warp panels bear a symbol indicative of their surrounding area, and the player can only access these warp panels with keys that match these symbols. Some warp panels lead to rooms containing various clues and story elements while others are gateways to shops, password rooms, and corridors. Keys allow players to access different portions of the Labyrinth, which they can then explore in a non-linear fashion.

In the shoot 'em up portion of the game known as the "Dungeon", the player battles through Naju's interior in spaceship form. The Dungeon consists of a series of enemy-filled corridors which are found during exploration of the Labyrinth. The player's objective in the Dungeon is to progress through each corridor and defeat the boss at the end. Upon completion, the player destroys the corridor and is returned to the Labyrinth, where a power-up (and sometimes a warp panel key) is collected as a reward. While some corridors can be accessed freely, others can only be entered by performing a particular action in the corridor room. Some rooms in the Labyrinth contain clues that indicate how to unseal these corridors. Ten of the corridors in the game serve as the safety devices which must be deactivated to win the game.

== Plot ==
In The Guardian Legend, the player controls the gynoid guardian of Earth, a "highly sophisticated aerobot transformer". (Note: Although her name is never stated in The Guardian Legend, she is given the nickname Miria (ミリア) and described as a "System D.P." cyborg in Guardic Gaiden.) The player's mission is to infiltrate Naju, a large planet-like object which aliens sent hurtling towards the Earth. (Note: Naju is described in many ways: as a "huge world" and a "star" in the American release, and as a "capsule" and a "planet" in the original Japanese game.) While inside, the player must activate ten safety devices in order to initialize Naju's self-destruct mechanism and destroy the alien world before it reaches Earth. Five hostile tribes of alien lifeforms are vying for control of territories within Naju, and the player needs to fight through them to successfully activate the switches and escape.

The story is advanced through a series of messages left by one or more unidentified predecessor(s) who unsuccessfully attempted to engage the self-destruct mechanism of Naju before the Guardian arrived. Left by the sole remaining survivor of the attack on Naju, the first message serves as an introduction; later messages give hints that help the player open locked corridors.

== Development ==
The Guardian Legend was developed for the Nintendo Famicom by Compile as the sequel to the 1986 MSX game Guardic, and was released as Guardic Gaiden in Japan by Irem on February 5, 1988. The director was Masamitsu "Moo" Niitani, Compile's president and the creator of the Puyo Puyo series. The development team featured many of the staff who helped create Guardic as well as Zanac and Blazing Lazers. The box art for Guardic Gaiden was created by Japanese science-fiction illustrator Naoyuki Kato and depicts the Guardian as a female cyborg. Though it is the sequel to a MSX game that was developed and published by Compile and makes use of the company's Lander characters, The Guardian Legend is the intellectual property of Irem.

The Guardian Legend was released for the NES in North America by Broderbund in April 1989; it was published in Europe by Nintendo in 1991. Nintendo Power previewed The Guardian Legend in January 1989, where they discussed the game's mechanics, graphics, and shoot 'em up sequences. They promised a full review in the following issue, but it was postponed due to a delay of the game's release. The Guardian Legend was exhibited at the 1989 Winter Consumer Electronics Show in Las Vegas, Nevada before its release; it was one of the prime attractions at the Broderbund booth along with the U-Force controller. In 1990, remaining inventory of The Guardian Legend was among the assets Broderbund sold to THQ along with the rest of its New Ventures Division.

== Reception ==
Reception

Review scores
| Publication | Score |
|---|---|
| Electronic Gaming Monthly | 6/5/6/7 |
| Famitsu | 30/40 |
| Game Informer | 7.75/10 |
| VideoGames & Computer Entertainment | 7/10 |
| Video Games | 76% |
| Power Play (DE) | 75% |

The game has received both praise and criticism for its multiple-genre format. It was reviewed by four people in a 1989 issue of Electronic Gaming Monthly shortly after the release of the game in 1989. Steve Harris said that the game does more than most shoot 'em ups and that it's a "good follow-up for Zanac fans". He added that the multiple-genre format "helps elevate the whole title to a much higher level". Ed Semrad called the game a Blaster Master clone and "only average at best", and he echoed Harris' opinion that those who enjoyed Zanac would enjoy The Guardian Legend. Donn Nauert said that the game is repetitive and offers little challenge and that it would have been better as a pure shoot 'em up; he pointed to a special password ("TGL") in which players can enter to bypass all of the Labyrinth portions. Jim Allee also compared the game to Zanac and repeated what Nauert said about the lack of difficulty except in the boss battles; he overall praised the game for successfully bringing together two distinct themes.

The Guardian Legend received accolades from the editors of Nintendo Power. The game appeared in the magazine's September 1989 issue, where it debuted at #9 on its "Top 30" NES Chart. The editors praised the game, and described the protagonist as "the ultimate transforming hero". The game would remain on the chart for nearly a year. In recognition of its achievements, the magazine's editors and staff nominated the game for several awards in its first-ever Nintendo Power Awards for 1989—among them, "Best Graphics & Sound", "Best Play Control", and "Best Overall"—but the game did not win the top award in any of these categories. Nintendo Power published a partial walkthrough for the game in the following November 1989 issue.

The game received moderate praise in some German gaming magazines after its European release. In Video Games magazine the reviewer praised the game as being a good action-adventure game in the same style of The Legend of Zelda; he notes that the need to find hidden items and areas and the top-down perspective closely resemble the Nintendo classic. He appreciated the variety and extras in the game, the various strategies needed to fight bosses, its difficulty, and the well-done graphics. The reviewers from Power Play compared The Guardian Legend to The Legend of Zelda and Life Force. They praised the diverse gameplay and weapons, difficulty, and the mixture of action-adventure and shoot 'em up elements. They criticized the game for lacking battery-backed RAM to save player progress—one of the reviewers said that "the wretched fumbling with the password had long ended"—as well as its lack of challenging puzzles and a high difficulty level in some of the shoot 'em up sections.

The game continued to receive praise from major game reviewers more than a decade since its release. In 2005, Lucas Thomas of the Evansville Courier & Press favorably compared The Guardian Legend with the NES title The Legend of Zelda and the Game Boy Advance title Sigma Star Saga; he emphasized Compile's successful fusion of the action-adventure, shoot 'em up and action role-playing game genres. Later, in a 2008 IGN article, Thomas listed the game at #2 on his "Top 10 Unreleased NES Hits" list and contended that The Guardian Legend took the concept of the multiple-genre game to a farther extent than Blaster Master. In October 2009, IGN ranked The Guardian Legend as #87 on its "Top 100 NES Games of All Time" list and deemed it "one of the most influential games in the history of the gaming industry". In March 2008, Game Informer editors referred to the game as "the ultimate genre bender" and likened it to a combination of the NES games The Legend of Zelda, Metroid, and 1942. While they acclaimed the game for its "exciting and challenging" shooter stages, they criticized it for its complex world map and "outrageous" password system. In a Gamasutra interview, Retro Game Challenge designer Mike Engler said that "The Guardian Legend is one of the best games ever released".

The graphics and sound of The Guardian Legend have been influential. Robert Dewar and Matthew Smosna of the open computing magazine Open Systems Today cited the game as an example of how graphics co-processors such as those in the NES can compensate for inadequate CPU speed in graphics-intensive computer applications. They noted that the fast-paced action seen in the game could not be replicated on a personal computer at that time (1992) without an expensive graphics board and regardless of CPU speed. The music of the game, composed by Masatomo Miyamoto and Takeshi Santo, has remained popular years after the game's release. Samantha Amjadali of the Melbourne-based newspaper The Herald Sun reported that a remixed tune from the game was rated as the second most popular track on the website OverClocked ReMix in March 2002. Video game cover band The Advantage's 2006 album Elf Titled features a cover version of music from one of the game's dungeon levels.

== See also ==
- Cauldron – 1985 video game that combines platformer and shoot 'em up gameplay
