= Zanac =

1986 video game

- North American NES box art
- Developer: Compile
- Publishers: JP: Pony Canyon; NA: FCI
- Designers: Masamitsu Niitani; Takayuki Hirono; Koji Teramoto
- Programmers: Takayuki Hirono; Masamitsu Niitani
- Artist: Koji Teramoto
- Composer: Masatomo Miyamoto
- Series: Zanac
- Platforms: MSX; Famicom Disk System; Nintendo Entertainment System; PlayStation
- Release: MSX: JP: 1986; Famicom Disk System: JP: November 11, 1986; NES: NA: October 1987; PlayStation: JP: November 29, 2001
- Genre: Scrolling shooter
- Mode: Single-player

Zanac (ザナック) is a scrolling shooter video game developed by Compile and published in Japan by Pony Canyon and in North America by FCI. It was released for the MSX computer, the Family Computer Disk System, the Nintendo Entertainment System, and for the Virtual Console. It was reworked for the MSX2 computer as Zanac EX and for the PlayStation as Zanac X Zanac. Players fly a lone starfighter, dubbed the AFX-6502 Zanac, through twelve levels; their goal is to destroy the System—a part-organic, part-mechanical entity bent on destroying mankind.

Zanac was developed by main core developers of Compile, including Masamitsu "Moo" Niitani, Koji "Janus" Teramoto, and Takayuki "Jemini" Hirono. All of these developers went on to make other popular similarly based games such as The Guardian Legend, Blazing Lazers, and the Puyo Puyo series. The game is known for its intense and fast-paced gameplay, level of difficulty, and music which seems to match the pace of the game. It has been praised for its unique adaptive artificial intelligence, in which the game automatically adjusts the difficulty level according to the player's skill level, rate of fire and the ship's current defensive status/capability.

== Gameplay ==
In Zanac, the player controls the spaceship AFX-6502 Zanac as it flies through various planets, space stations, and outer space and through an armada of enemies comprising the defenses of the game's main antagonist—the "System". The player must fight through twelve levels and destroy the System and its defenses. The objective is to shoot down enemies and projectiles and accumulate points. Players start with three lives, and they lose a life if they get hit by an enemy or projectile. After losing a life, gameplay continues with the player reappearing on the screen and losing all previously accumulated power-ups; the player remains temporarily invincible for a moment upon reappearing on the screen. The game ends when all the player's lives have been lost or after completing the twelfth and final area. However, the player can earn 1-ups (extra lives) throughout the game by accumulating high point scores. Zanac has a continue option which allows players to restart the game from the level in which they lost all their lives.

The player operates a rapid-fire main cannon, which can be upgraded by collecting power-ups found in blue boxes that periodically descend from the top of the screen. As the main cannon's power level is upgraded, the number of bullets fired from the ship as well as their speed increases. In addition, the player operates a specialty weapon that is separate from the main cannon. There are eight different specialty weapons, each represented by differently-numbered power-ups. The player can change the type of specialty weapon equipped by collecting a differently-numbered power-up or can upgrade their current specialty weapon by collecting a numbered power-up that matches their current weapon. These weapons range from directional bullets to shields to indestructible projectiles. Players lose all accumulated power-ups if they lose a life.

Gameplay on the NES version

Enemies in Zanac include meteors, various bullet-shooting enemy aircraft, bullet-resistant disks, ground turrets, and reconnaissance planes. The bosses consist of stationary fortresses consisting entirely of ground turrets. The player must destroy all these turrets within a specified time limit to score bonus points. Every stage has one or more of these stationary fortresses. In addition, large enemy ships acting as "mini-bosses" appear throughout the game. These ships are more resistant to the player's weaponry; all bullets inflict minor damage and are repelled off the mini-bosses, which change color as they become more damaged.

The distinguishing aspect of Zanac's gameplay is its unique enemy artificial intelligence, called the "Automatic Level of Difficulty Control" or ALC. The ALC measures the System's aggressiveness and the game's difficulty depending on the actions of the player, such as attack pattern and skill level. The ALC increases for experts but decreases for inexperienced players. For instance, shooting the main cannon frequently, collecting power-ups, and failing to destroy bosses within the specified time limit increases the ALC, resulting in a greater number of tougher enemies appearing on-screen. However, actions such as losing lives, starting a new level, or destroying reconnaissance planes reduces the ALC, resulting in fewer on-screen enemies.

== Plot ==
Gameplay of Zanac on the MSX, where the game debuted

The plot of Zanac revolves around the "System"—a device figuratively similar to Pandora's box. The System was created millennia ago by an unknown alien race. It contains boundless wisdom and knowledge, as well as vast destructive potential. If properly opened it would grant access to untold wisdom and technology, but if improperly accessed it would unleash almost unlimited destruction. Mankind attempted to access the System and failed, causing the System to spread throughout space and to exert mass destruction on all forms of life, including the human race. Mankind then discovered how to properly access the knowledge and technology within the System, but could not shut its destructive expansion down because of its vast tactical systems.

Moreover, the defenses of the System are designed around destroying and overcoming entire fleets. Mankind hopes that a lone starfighter may be able to slip through and penetrate the defenses of the System, allowing such a ship to fight its way into the heart of the System and destroy it. The AFX-6502 Zanac, the most advanced starfighter ever produced, is launched on a desperate mission to fight its way to the heart of the System and shut it down.

== Release history ==
Zanac was initially released in 1986 for the MSX computer by the Japanese video game company Compile—the same company responsible for other games such as Blazing Lazers, Devil's Crush, and the Puyo Puyo series. Compile then re-released the game for the MSX2 computer later that same year as Zanac EX, which featured improved graphics (with smooth scrolling) and extended music over the original MSX version. Zanac was then ported and heavily reworked again for release on the Family Computer Disk System in Japan on November 11, 1986, and then in North America for the NES in October 1987. The NES version was later re-released for Wii's Virtual Console service on December 3, 2007, and published by D4 Enterprise. This version is identical to the NES version released in 1987.

Compile released a compilation titled Zanac X Zanac for Sony's PlayStation console in Japan on November 29, 2001, to commemorate the 15th anniversary of the original. This compilation features an updated version of Zanac—titled Zanac Neo—and three versions of the NES version of the game, including a version featuring enhanced graphics and sound. The game features two-player cooperative gameplay as well as a remix of the game's soundtrack.

A version of the game was released on the Nintendo Switch via the G-Mode Archives series in January 2021.

== Reception and legacy ==
Reception

Review scores
Publication	Score
AllGame	4/5
GameSpot	7.5
IGN	6.5

Zanac, in retrospect, has been considered a unique shoot 'em up game, combining gameplay elements from games such as Xevious, especially with the extensive power-up system and vertical-scrolling gameplay that features both air and ground targets. Brett Alan Weiss of Allgame praised Zanac, calling it an extremely fast-paced shooter in which the player is almost completely surrounded by enemy ships and bullets. He praises the game for its music which seems to flow along with the action of the game; he calls the music "at least as close as you can get to a Zen moment while playing a shooting game on the NES". Frank Provo of GameSpot lauded Zanac for its difficulty level, its ability to handle many sprites on the screen without slowdown or other glitches, and its unique AI, which placed this game in a subgenre of its own. However, criticisms include mediocre and primitive music and sound, a steep learning curve in gameplay and difficulty level, and poor translation in the game itself and in the game's instruction manual. In addition, Weiss says that enemies in Zanac, while fearsome, "don't have much personality".
