= Star Parodier =

1992 video game

- Developer: Kaneko
- Publisher: Hudson Soft
- Composers: Hiroshi Saito; Jin Watanabe; Shinichi Sakamoto (PSG)
- Platform: PC Engine CD
- Release: 1992
- Genre: Shoot 'em up
- Mode: Single-player

Star Parodier (スターパロジャー, Sutā Parojā) is a vertical-scrolling shoot 'em up video game developed by Kaneko and published by Hudson Soft for the PC Engine CD-ROM² in 1992. It is a spin-off of the Star Soldier series and was localized for North America as Fantasy Star Soldier, but this version was never released. The game was released for the Wii Virtual Console on March 7, 2008 in Japan, March 16 in Europe and later in North America on August 11.

== Gameplay ==
Star Parodier is a vertical scrolling shooter, much like the Star Soldier games, and features many of the same conventions, such as collecting power-ups to upgrade the player's weapons, and facing several bosses and minibosses as they progress through the game. The game also features the 2- and 5-minute high score time attack modes seen in previous games.

In parodying the hard sci-fi atmosphere of the Star Soldier games, Star Parodier takes a lighthearted approach by featuring cute, cartoonish graphics and toning down the violence (for example, defeated enemies wave white flags in surrender). The players choose from three craft to play as in the game: the Paro Ceaser from Star Soldier, a giant flying Bomberman or an anthropomorphic PC Engine console that shoots HuCards and CD-ROMs at enemies.

== Development and release ==
The title is also playable on the Turbografx-16/PC Engine Mini Console.

== Reception ==
Reception

Review scores
Publication	Score
Consoles +	80%
Eurogamer	7/10
Famitsu	8/10, 8/10, 7/10, 6/10
Gekkan PC Engine	85/100, 85/100, 95/100, 80/100, 90/100
Génération 4	91%
IGN	8/10
Joypad	93%
Joystick	90%
Marukatsu PC Engine	8/10, 9/10, 9/10, 9/10
Nintendo Life	9/10
Player One	92%
Play Time	69%

According to Famitsu, Star Parodier sold over 2,999 copies in its first month on the market in Japan. The Japanese publication Micom BASIC Magazine ranked the game second in popularity in its July 1992 issue, and it received a 24.97/30 score in a 1993 readers' poll conducted by PC Engine Fan, ranking among PC Engine titles at the number 14 spot. It also garnered generally favorable reviews from critics.
