= Golvellius =

1987 video game

- Developer: Compile
- Publishers: Compile; Sega (Master System)
- Platforms: MSX, Master System, iPhone OS
- Release: MSX: JP: April 1987; Master System: JP: August 14, 1988; NA: December 1988; EU: 1988; MSX2: JP: December 15, 1988; MSX2 (Super Cooks): JP: May 1, 1989; iPhone OS: WW: September 22, 2009
- Genre: Action role-playing
- Mode: Single-player

Maou Golvellius (魔王ゴルベリアス; lit. "Devil Golvellius") is an action role-playing video game developed by Compile and originally released for the Japanese MSX home computer system in 1987. In 1988, Compile released a remake for the MSX2 system, titled Shin Maou Golvellius (真・魔王ゴルベリアス; lit. "True Devil Golvellius"). This game featured mostly the same graphics as the ones in the Sega Master System version, but the overworld and dungeon layouts are entirely different.

== Master System ==
Sega licensed the franchise in 1988 and released the game for the Master System (the Mark III in Japan), featuring enhanced graphics and entirely different overworld and dungeon layouts. This version was released worldwide under the name Golvellius: Valley of Doom. The plot revolved around the hero (Kelesis) entering the Valley of Doom to rescue Princess Rena, who had gone to the valley to obtain a rare herb needed to heal her father the King.

Gameplay mostly focused on a top down action game, where the player attacked monsters with a sword. Sometimes a secret chamber opened up where various characters would offer advice, better weapons, and other items. The game was divided into eight distinct environments (Note: Valley, desert, graveyard, fields, swamp, beach, woods, and forest. The "fields" level connects the graveyard and swamp and has no boss to defeat) each ruled by a boss, which needed to be defeated before progressing to the next area of the map. (Note: A loophole in the game allows the player, once acquiring aqua-boots, to enter the final level much earlier using an underground river, yet the level is nearly impossible to navigate due to the lack of proper weapons and experience levels) The game also consisted of an underground portion in caverns, rotating between a sideways advancing and top down scrolling screen in order to reach a level boss's lair.

The final level, only reachable once all boss monsters have been beaten, is to defeat Golvellius who has a secret lair revealed by following clues of the game characters. Once Golvellius is defeated, it is revealed he was possessed by a demon and is in fact a good and kind creature who will now travel with the hero Kelesis. The game implies a sequel involving Kelesis, Golvellius and Rena, but this was never produced.

== Other versions ==
In 2009, it was announced by DotEmu/D4 Entreprise that Golvellius was to be re-released for the iPhone OS platform. It is a port of the Master System version.

The scenario is the same in all the three different versions of Golvellius. The ending promised a sequel, which was never developed/released. However, there is a spin-off game titled Super Cooks that was included in the 1989 release of the Disc Station Special Shoka Gou.

== Reception ==
Computer and Video Games rated the Sega Master System version 87% in 1989. Computer Entertainer scored it 7 out of 8 stars the same year. Console XS rated it 82% in 1992.
