= MMode =

AT&T Data Service name

mMode was the brand name for the wireless data service offered by the former AT&T Wireless. Based on NTT DoCoMo's i-mode, it was available to any AT&T Wireless subscriber with a WAP-capable phone. Operating over GPRS, EDGE, and UMTS, mMode was the successor to AT&T's unsuccessful CDPD-based Pocketnet. Launched in April 2002, it was no longer available to new subscribers following the Cingular takeover, but legacy AT&T Wireless subscribers were able to access the system until June 2010.

== Features ==
- Access to sites with WAP-enabled pages, such as eBay and Yahoo!
- "@mmode.com" email account
- Ringtones and graphics available for purchase and download
- "Find a Friend", a service which enabled one subscriber to find another subscriber's approximate location using triangulation. Cingular has since removed this feature.
- mMode Music Store, launched in October 2004, allowed subscribers to purchase music and have it charged to their wireless bill (note that the music could not be played on the phone, it had to be downloaded to the user's computer)
