= Final Soldier =

1991 video game

- Developer: Now Production
- Publisher: Hudson Soft
- Platform: PC Engine
- Release: 1991
- Genre: Vertical-scrolling shooter
- Mode: Single-player

Final Soldier (Note: Japanese: ファイナルソルジャー, Hepburn: Fainaru Sorujā) is a 1991 vertical-scrolling shooter video game developed by Now Production and published by Hudson Soft in Japan. It is the third game in the main Star Soldier series, and has been released in Europe for the Wii Virtual Console on May 2, 2008 and in North America on September 8. It was subsequently released for the Wii U Virtual Console in Japan in 2014 and North America in 2017.

== Gameplay ==
This game features 7 stages to play as well as a 2-minute and 5-minute challenge mode. Unlike the other PC-Engine Star Soldier games, the player chooses at the beginning of the game the exact kind of weapon each color power-up grants.

== Reception ==
Reception

Review scores
Publication	Score
AllGame	3.5/5
Aktueller Software Markt	9/12
Consoles +	68%
Computer and Video Games	92/100
Eurogamer	6/10
Famitsu	28/40
Games-X	4/5
Gekkan PC Engine	80/100, 75/100, 80/100, 80/100, 75/100
Génération 4	92%
IGN	7/10
Joypad	90%
Joystick	91%
Marukatsu PC Engine	8/10, 8/10, 7/10, 8/10
Nintendo Life	8/10
Player One	70%
Video Games (DE)	74%
Consolemania	90/100
Electric Brain	77%
Game Boy	4/5, 4/5, 4/5, 3/5, 3/5
Game Zone	82/100
Hippon Super!	7/10
Power Play	73%

The Japanese publication Micom BASIC Magazine ranked Final Soldier fifth in popularity in its September 1991 issue, and it received a 21.31/30 score in a 1993 readers' poll conducted by PC Engine Fan, ranking among PC Engine titles at the number 214 spot. The game garnered generally favorable reviews from critics.
