= Gunhed (film) =

1989 film by Masato Harada

- Theatrical release poster
- Japanese: ガンヘッド
- Directed by: Masato Harada
- Written by: Masato Harada; James Bannon
- Produced by: Tomoyuki Tanaka; Eiji Yamoura
- Starring: Masahiro Takashima; Brenda Bakke; Eugene Harada; Kaori Mizushima
- Cinematography: Juniichi Fujisawa
- Edited by: Fumio Ogawa
- Music by: Toshiyuki Honda
- Production companies: Toho; Nippon Sunrise; Bandai; Kadokawa; Imagica
- Distributed by: Toho
- Release date: 22 July 1989 (Japan)
- Running time: 100 minutes
- Country: Japan
- Languages: Japanese; English

Gunhed (Japanese: ガンヘッド, Hepburn: Ganheddo) is a 1989 Japanese cyberpunk tokusatsu mecha action film co-written and directed by Masato Harada, featuring special effects by Kōichi Kawakita, and starring Masahiro Takashima, Brenda Bakke, Eugene Harada, Kaori Mizushima, and Mickey Curtis. It was released by Toho on July 22, 1989.

== Plot ==
In the year 2038, the world is ruled by supercomputers powered by a rare and powerful element called Texmexium. Years earlier, the Kyron-5 AI, created by the Cybortech Company and housed on the isolated island 8JO, rebelled against humanity, sparking a devastating war. Though a specialized GUNHED (Gun UNit of Heavy Eliminate Device) battalion was sent to shut it down, they were defeated. The island was abandoned, left to Kyron-5’s control—until a group of tech scavengers arrives seeking profit in the ruins.

The scavenger team aboard the Mary Ann, led by Captain Bansho, includes Brooklyn, a skilled but reluctant former pilot; Babe, a brave and determined crew member; Bombbay, Barabbas, and Boomerang. They infiltrate the facility, but Kyron-5's automated defenses quickly eliminate several of them—Boomerang and Boxer die outside, while Bansho and Barabbas are killed inside an elevator. Brooklyn, Babe, and Bombbay survive and discover Sgt. Nim, a wounded Texas Air Ranger on a mission to recover the stolen Texmexium and destroy a rogue Bio-Droid.

Nim joins the scavengers, but the Bio-Droid soon kills Bombbay. The survivors find a vial of Texmexium in Kyron-5's core, only to be attacked by the Bio-Droid again. Babe sacrifices herself, falling into a vat of chemicals with the Bio-Droid—though she survives, fused with the machine in a tragic transformation.

Brooklyn and Nim encounter Aerobot, Kyron-5’s lethal guardian robot, and narrowly escape. They meet Seven and Eleven, two children who are the last human survivors of the original custodians of the island. While Eleven is mute, her silence hides a dangerous secret: Kyron-5 embedded a hidden activation code in her, making her an unwitting tool in its plan for world domination.

Meanwhile, Brooklyn and Seven uncover the remains of the old GUNHED battalion. Brooklyn repairs and revives GUNHED 507, confronting his fear of piloting. Through GUNHED, they learn that Kyron-5 halted its attacks 13 years ago to wait for the final form of Texmexium to be developed. With the Bio-Droid still hunting them and Kyron-5's plan nearing completion, Brooklyn prepare to launch an assault.

Nim couldn't wait for Brooklyn and decided to travel ahead with Eleven. While traveling to the upper-levels, the Bio-Droid took back the Texmexium from Nim. After notifying Brooklyn what happened, Nim decided to head to the core to retrieve the Texmexium back. Brooklyn realized they couldn't wait anymore and launched GUNHED. As Brooklyn battled his way through the heavily armed facility, Kyron-5 manipulated Eleven to activate the code. Nim realizes this just in time and prevents Eleven from executing the code.

During the climactic battle, GUNHED fights Aerobot but is ultimately disabled. Brooklyn finishes the fight manually, destroying Aerobot in a final showdown. The Bio-Droid returns one last time, but the fused Babe sacrifices herself with a grenade to destroy it and save the others.

With its plans foiled, Kyron-5 initiates a self-destruct sequence to obliterate the island. In a final act of heroism, the damaged GUNHED launches itself into Kyron-5, buying the team 15 minutes to escape. Brooklyn, Nim, Seven, and Eleven flee aboard the Mary Ann, narrowly escaping the explosion. As they fly away, GUNHED transmits its final message: “Mission complete.”

== Cast ==
- Masahiro Takashima as Brooklyn
- Brenda Bakke as Sgt. Nim
- Eugene Harada as Seven
- Kaori Mizushima as Eleven
- Mickey Curtis as Bansho
- Aya Enjōji as Babe
- Jay Kabira as Bombbay
- Brewster Thompson as Barabbas James
  - Thompson is also the Bio-Droid suit actor
- Yôsuke Saitô as Boxer
- Doll Nguyen as Boomerang
- Randy Reyes as the voice of Gunhed
- Michael Yancy as the voice of the narrator

== Release ==
Gunhed was released theatrically on July 22, 1989, in Japan where it was distributed by Toho. In the Philippines, the film was released as Killer Tank on December 17, 1992. It was released in the United Kingdom in 1994.

=== Home media ===
Gunhed was released in the United States by ADV Films in both an English dub and English subtitled format on November 30, 2004.

== Reception ==
=== Critical response ===
In a contemporary review, Derek Elley wrote in Variety that the film was "derivative of films by Ridley Scott and James Cameron" and described Gunhed as "hokey" and critiqued "cheesy dialogue", "unflashy f/x" and "a bland pop-synth soundtrack" while noting "good model work". Elley concluded that in Gunhed, "Things pick up in the final half-hour, which eventually delivers the action goods without springing any major surprises."

From retrospective reviews, Donald C. Willis wrote about the film in his book Horror and Science Fiction Film IV, specifying that Gunhed was a "exuberant action/effects spectacular" with "an effect-a-second pace and an Alien, lost-in-technology feel to its human interaction." The Time Out Film Guide referred the film as "impenetrable tosh (at least in the English version)".

== Video games ==
There are two video games based on Gunhed:

- Blazing Lazers (Gunhed), released for the PC Engine (TurboGrafx-16) in 1989.
- Gunhed: The New Battle, released for the Famicom (Nintendo Entertainment System) in 1990.

Other video games had elements inspired by Gunhed:

- In the original 1990 MSX2 release of Metal Gear 2: Solid Snake, the character portrait for Holly White is based on Brenda Bakke in Gunhed.
- The Gunhed and Brooklyn were featured as downloadable content in Super Robot Wars X-Ω, the 2015 IOS Android installment of Bandai Namco Entertainment's tactical role-playing crossover Mecha game franchise, Super Robot Wars.

== "Mindphaser" music video ==
A promotional music video for the Front Line Assembly song "Mindphaser" (1992) was directed by Robert Lee and produced by Gary Blair Smith including footage from Gunhed. The video depicts Front Line Assembly inserted into clips of the film. The Japanese film company let Front Line Assembly use any footage of the film in exchange for the right to use any changes the band would make for themselves. The video also received airplay on MTV.

The video won "Best Alternative Video" at MuchMusic's 1992 Canadian Music Video Awards. After having won the award, Front Line Assembly shed some light on the production of the video on MuchMusic. Bill Leeb considered their approach to writing to be quite unconventional. "I was shown some footage first", said Leeb, "we actually wrote the song to the footage. Also the lyrics were written to the footage." "There was a lot of brainstorming between us and the people involved in the video", added Rhys Fulber. According to the band it was rather the images than the actual plot of the film the video clip is based on that inspired writing. "The actual storyline is kind of hard to follow because it's all in Japanese obviously", Fulber explained. Although "even just visually it's hard to follow [...] it's just the imagery we found quite amazing." Leeb commented on concerns that the imagery might push the music into the background. "A lot of times videos actually wreck songs" by pushing the listener in a direction, he said. In contrast, "this way it worked hand in hand really well."
