= Marble Saga: Kororinpa =

2009 video game

- Developer: Hudson Soft
- Publisher: Hudson Soft
- Platform: Wii
- Release: NA: March 17, 2009; EU: May 1, 2009; JP: August 6, 2009
- Genre: Puzzle
- Modes: Single-player, multiplayer (Nintendo Wi-Fi Connection)

Marble Saga: Kororinpa is a video game for Nintendo's Wii video game console. It was released in North America on March 17, 2009, roughly two years after the original title Kororinpa: Marble Mania. The game was released in Europe under the title Marbles! Balance Challenge and in Japan as Kororinpa 2: Anthony to Kiniro Himawari no Tane (コロリンパ２ アンソニーと金色ひまわりのタネ, Kororinpa 2 Ansonī to Kiniro Himawari no Tane; Kororinpa 2: Anthony and the Golden Sunflower Seed).

The game sets players on a journey to help Anthony the Ant on his quest to find the Golden Sunflower. Players must navigate their customized marble through unique and treacherous mazes to help Anthony reach his goal. The game utilizes the same world-turning technique as the first, requiring players to twist and turn the Wii Remote to control the environment.

According to an interview with the producer Osamu Tsuchihashi, the game took around 2 years to develop, and it was made by 15 developers.

== Gameplay ==
In Marble Saga: Kororinpa, the player tilts the playing field, using the Wii Remote to navigate a spherical object around mazes to reach the end goal, similar to Kororinpa: Marble Mania, the preceding title. Players have also drawn similarities to the Super Monkey Ball series. Some mazes cause the player to tilt them in such a way so that a wall becomes a floor, or to interact with objects such as magnets, conveyor belts, or cannons. Depending on the difficulty level, different collectibles are available in each level. On all difficulty settings, players must collect the Yellow Crystals to complete the level. In Easy and Normal Mode, players must also collect the Stump Temple Pieces in order to unlock the game's final world. Also in Normal Mode, players can collect Green Crystals which unlock extra levels. In the highest difficulty setting, players must retrieve the colony's missing ants from each level. In addition to the collectibles, players may be awarded with bronze, silver, gold, or platinum trophies for completing levels within a predetermined amount of time. Obtaining these trophies also unlocks new balls.

The game features 7 different worlds with a variety of gadgets to help players through their journey. The game features 150+ levels with a variety of collectibles available in each mode including Yellow Crystals, Green Crystals, Stump Temple Pieces, and eventually ants from Anthony's colony. New features for Marble Saga: Kororinpa include increased customization elements in the game. Players can design their own marble by assigning it certain attributes and techniques, and they can even place their own Mii inside the marble. A brand-new level editor has been included, allowing players to share their creations through WiiConnect24.

== Reception ==
Reception

Aggregate score
Aggregator	Score
Metacritic	74/100

Review scores
Publication	Score
Destructoid	7/10
Famitsu	26/40
Game Informer	8/10
GamePro	4/5
GameSpot	7/10
GameZone	8/10
IGN	6.5/10
Nintendo Life	6/10
Nintendo Power	7.5/10
Nintendo World Report	9/10

The game received "mixed or average reviews" according to the review aggregation website Metacritic. In Japan, Famitsu gave it a score of two sevens and two sixes for a total of 26 out of 40.
