= Blazing Lazers =

1989 video game

- North American box art
- Developer: Compile
- Publishers: JP: Hudson Soft; NA: NEC
- Director: Masamitsu Niitani
- Designers: Koji Teramoto; Hiromichi Sueyoshi; Kazuyuki Nakashima
- Programmer: Takayuki Hirono
- Platform: TurboGrafx-16
- Release: JP: July 7, 1989; NA: November 1989
- Genre: Scrolling shooter
- Mode: Single-player

Gunhed, (Note: Japanese: ガンヘッド, Hepburn: Ganheddo) known as Blazing Lazers (Note: Japanese: ブレイジングレーザーズ, Hepburn: Bureijingu Rēzāzu) in North America, is a vertically scrolling shooter game by Hudson Soft and Compile, based on the Japanese film Gunhed. The title was released in 1989 for the PC Engine in Japan and re-skinned for the TurboGrafx-16 in North America, with Gunhed unofficially imported for the PC Engine in Europe. In the game, a fictional galaxy is under attack by an enemy space armada called the Dark Squadron, and this galaxy's only chance for survival is the Gunhed Advanced Star Fighter, who must destroy the Dark Squadron and its Super Weapons. The gameplay features fast vertical scrolling and a wide array of weapons for the player to use.

Blazing Lazers was produced by the same personnel who developed other video game series such as Puyo Puyo and Super Bomberman as well as other games such as Zanac, The Guardian Legend, and DoReMi Fantasy: Milon's DokiDoki Adventure. It was one of the first games released for the TurboGrafx-16 and has received critical praise for its graphical capabilities, lack of slowdown, intense gameplay, and sound. The Blazing Lazers version of the game has been released on the Wii's Virtual Console service in North America, Europe and Australia in 2007, and in Japan the following year. This same version was later released in Japan on the PlayStation Network in 2010, and on the Wii U's Virtual Console in 2014.

== Gameplay ==
The player dealing with enemy ships, shooting pyramids, and Moais in Area 5

The player takes control of the Gunhed Advanced Star Fighter through nine vertically scrolling areas. The player's mission is to destroy the Dark Squadron and its eight enemy Super Weapons. Every area contains one or more bosses, all of which must be destroyed before continuing in the game. Players lose a life if they are hit by an enemy or projectile, with the game continuing at a previously–crossed checkpoint, unless they grab a flashing orb which destroys all on-screen enemies and allows them to continue at the point where their previous ship was destroyed (represented by the icon illustrating the remaining number of ships turning gold). The game ends when all lives have been lost, but the game awards 1-ups when the player scores a particular number of points. The game provides four continues in which players can restart the game at that level in which their previous game ended provided the system is not turned off.

The player controls a rapid-fire main cannon, which can either be upgraded or changed to other types of weapons by collecting various numbered power-ups and purple orbs called "gel capsules". Players can collect optional power-ups to help fight through the game such as "multibodies" that shadow their actions, homing missiles, shields, and enhanced firing capabilities known as "full fire". The player carries a limited supply of "cluster bombs" that can be deployed, destroying large quantities of enemies and bosses within the player's vicinity. Players have the function of selecting the speed of their ship, which can be toggled by pressing a button on the gamepad, among five different speeds (the button cycles between them in order). The number of triangles that appear below the player's score designate the speed of the player's ship. This allows players to customize the behavior of their ship at any time, trading off freedom of movement against ease of control: a faster ship is more agile, while a slower ship can be maneuvered more precisely.

== Development and release ==
Blazing Lazers was co-produced by Hudson Soft and Compile. The game was directed by Masamitsu "Moo" Niitani, president of Compile and creator of Zanac, The Guardian Legend, and the Puyo Puyo series; Mikio Ueyama, director of the Super Bomberman series for the Super NES; and Tadayuki Kawada, designer of the Super Famicom game DoReMi Fantasy. The game was released as Gunhed on July 7, 1989 for the Japanese PC Engine console as a tie-in to the film of the same name. It was subsequently released in North America as Blazing Lazers in November, with the game localized by removing the references to the film. The non-Gunhed version of the game was re-released on the Wii's Virtual Console service in 2007 for North America on September 5, in Europe on January 5, in Australia on June 7, and in Japan on June 17, 2008. This version was also released for the PlayStation Network in Japan on July 21, 2010. During development of the game Super Star Soldier, NEC considered calling the game Blazing Lazers II because of the similarity in gameplay with Blazing Lazers. The game was featured in a preview of then-future TurboGrafx-16 games in Electronic Gaming Monthly in November 1989. In a section previewing TurboGrafx-16 games, EGM said that game was a "total blast from start to finish".

== Reception ==
Reception

Review scores
| Publication | Score |
|---|---|
| ACE | 900/1000 (PCE) |
| Computer and Video Games | 96% (PCE) |
| Dragon | 5/5 (TG16) |
| Electronic Gaming Monthly | 31/40 (TG16) |
| Famitsu | 30/40 (PCE) |
| GameSpot | 7/10 (VC) |
| IGN | 8/10 (VC) |
| Zero | 91% (PCE) |

The game received critical acclaim and has been considered by game reviewers as one of the better shoot 'em up video games in the genre as well as one of the best games on the PC Engine/TurboGrafx-16 gaming console. Japanese game publication Famitsu reviewed Gunhed, giving the game a 30 out of 40 score. Gunhed, which was unofficially imported for the PC Engine in Europe, received highly positive reviews from British publications Computer and Video Games, Zero, and ACE, the latter rating it the fourth best game available for the PC Engine in 1989.

Blazing Lazers was reviewed in Electronic Gaming Monthly by a panel of four critics. Donn Nauert and Martin Alessi rated it 9 each; Nauert called it his favorite of the console's launch games, while Alessi called it the best shoot 'em up on any console, opining that the gameplay, bosses, and music are "near perfect". Steve Harris rated it 7, saying that the game takes advantage of the TurboGrafx-16's processors with its graphics and animation, while "the play mechanics steal from the best the category has to offer". Ed Semrad rated it 6, praising the detailed backgrounds and intense action, but found the game eventually becomes repetitive and is ultimately only "slightly better than average". Hartley, Patricia, and Kirk Lesser from Dragon reviewed the game in its "The Role of Computers" column, giving the game 5 out of 5 stars. VideoGames & Computer Entertainment said that it is "one of the fastest games for the TurboGrafx-16" and "will keep you going for hours".

In 1997, Electronic Gaming Monthly editors ranked Blazing Lazers number 77 on their "100 Best Games of All Time", saying that it stands out from other shooters by providing a near-constant stream of power-ups and a corresponding onslaught of enemies, which ensures that the player always has access to good weaponry and makes the game extremely intense, particularly in its later levels.

Blazing Lazers received further praise after it was released on the Virtual Console. Mike Fahey from Kotaku describes the game as the "best damn shooter on the TurboGrafx, if not best game overall". Lucas Thomas from IGN referred to the game as superior to other shoot 'em up games such as Super Star Soldier, Gradius III, and the R-Type series. Thomas further asserts that the game had "pushed the [TurboGrafx-16] to its limits". Brett Alan Weiss from Allgame considered this game as "one of the most highly regarded games in the TurboGrafx-16 library". Frank Provo from GameSpot said that the game compensates for its plain graphics and aesthetics with intense gameplay and a "ridiculous orgy of firepower". He also lauded the game for its diverse weaponry, lack of graphical slowdown seen in some older console games, and the superior, futuristic audio, which he said has an "optimistic quality" to it.

Jeremy Parish from the site 1UP.com praised Blazing Lazers, saying that the game is "drowned in goodness". Justin Leeper from GameSpy especially praised the game also for its lack of slowdown, stating that prior to 1989 players could only experience the same in arcades. He claimed that the game surpassed any game on the Nintendo Entertainment System at that time. He lauded the smooth scrolling, lush background graphics, and "catchy tunes". Paul Glancey from the UK-based magazine Computer and Video Games gave it a score 96%, praising the gameplay, difficulty, graphics and sound, calling it "utterly incredible" and stating that "anyone on the quest for the ultimate shoot 'em up—this is it! THIS IS IT!!".
