= Kororinpa =

2006 video game

- Developer: Hudson Soft
- Publisher: Hudson Soft
- Platforms: Wii, mobile phone
- Release: Wii: JP: December 2, 2006; EU: February 23, 2007; AU: March 1, 2007; NA: March 20, 2007; i-mode: JP: April 1, 2007
- Genre: Puzzle
- Mode: Single-player

Kororinpa (Note: Japanese: コロリンパ, Hepburn: Kororinpa), known as Kororinpa: Marble Mania in North America, is a puzzle video game developed and published by Hudson Soft for the Wii. It was released in Japan on December 2, 2006 as a launch title for the console, then in Europe on February 23, 2007 and North America on March 20, 2007.

== Gameplay ==
Kororinpa is based on the marble game Labyrinth, but instead of using knobs on the sides to tilt the level, the player rotates the Wii Remote as if they were holding the twisted pathways of each maze in order to navigate a spherical object to the end goal. There are 45 levels that increase in difficulty sequentially and eventually require some speed as well as accuracy.

Some mazes cause the player to tilt them in such a way so that a wall becomes a floor, or to interact with objects such as magnets or conveyor belts. Each level contains a number of orange crystals and a single green crystal. Collection of all orange crystals is necessary for progression, while green crystals are optional, but unlock secret levels. In addition, players may be awarded with bronze, silver, or gold trophies for completing levels within a predetermined amount of time. Obtaining these trophies unlocks new balls, music, and 5 additional bonus levels. Once the forty-five single-player levels have been completed, a mirror mode is unlocked.

== Development ==
The team at Hudson Soft started to create a game with the idea of being a Wii exclusive. After an extensive contemplation of the console features, they focused in the motion controls.

The chief designer Osamu Tsuchihashi, said that the inspiration of marbles in mazes made from arts and crafts, came from his childhood. Where he would hammer nails in a wooden box and put marbles inside to play.

== Reception ==
Reception

Aggregate score
Aggregator	Score
Metacritic	69/100

Review scores
Publication	Score
Edge	6/10
Electronic Gaming Monthly	7.33/10 (Note: Two critics of Electronic Gaming Monthly gave the game each a score of 7.5/10, and the other gave it 7/10.)
Eurogamer	6/10
Famitsu	24/40
Game Informer	8/10
GameSpot	5.8/10
GameSpy	3.5/5
GameTrailers	5.6/10
Hardcore Gamer	4.5/5
IGN	(US) 6.2/10 (UK) 6/10
Nintendo Power	7/10
Nintendo World Report	7/10
The New York Times	(favorable)
The Sydney Morning Herald	2.5/5

The Wii version received "average" reviews according to the review aggregation website Metacritic. IGN UK cited the game as being "hard not to warm to", noting the "jolly soundtrack and cunning level design difficult to resist". However, they criticized the game for its lack of levels or challenge, and its "ill-conceived camera". In Japan, however, Famitsu gave it a score of all four sixes for a total of 24 out of 40. GameZone gave it a score of 6.5 out of 10, saying that the game "utilizes the Wii nicely. It's not a game that will last a long time, though, and it doesn't offer enough game hours to warrant the initial price."

Kororinpa sold only 2,416 units on December 2, 2006, the day of the Wii launch in Japan.

== Sequel ==
Marble Saga: Kororinpa features a plot in which the player assists a small ant named Anthony and his colony to locate the Golden Sunflower Seed. Players navigate through seventy-one stages across nine areas to open the Stump Temple, the final area. Marble Saga: Kororinpa also features thirty special stages in the North American release and one hundred special stages in the European release designed for use with the Wii Balance Board controller. The game features multiplayer race modes, an edit mode for custom stage creation and sharing through Nintendo Wi-Fi Connection, and Mii integration. The game was released in North America on March 17, 2009, in Europe on May 1, 2009 and in Japan on August 6, 2009. A Nintendo 3DS follow-up was planned but never released.
