= Super Star Soldier =

1990 video game

- Developer: Kaneko
- Publishers: JP: Hudson Soft; NA: NEC
- Producer: Mitsuhiro Kadowaki
- Designer: Tadayuki Kawada
- Programmers: Takashi Yamashita; Takashi Sugimoto
- Artists: Hiroshi Yokoyama; Kenichi Saeki
- Composers: Nozomi Nakahashi; Keita Hoshi
- Series: Star Soldier
- Platform: TurboGrafx-16
- Release: JP: July 6, 1990; NA: March 1991
- Genre: Vertically scrolling shooter
- Mode: Single-player

Super Star Soldier (Note: Japanese: スーパースターソルジャー, Hepburn: Sūpā Sutā Sorujā) is a scrolling shooter video game developed by Kaneko and originally published by Hudson Soft in 1990 for the Japanese PC Engine and in 1991 for the North American TurboGrafx-16. It is the sequel to Star Soldier, and part of a vertical-scrolling shooter series by Hudson Soft.

It was released for the Virtual Console on Nintendo's Wii system in North America on November 27, 2006, and in Japan and Europe in December. The game has also been released on the Japanese PlayStation Store on August 19, 2009 and on the North American PlayStation Store on June 3, 2011. It was also released on the Windows Store on December 20, 2013 and on Wii U Virtual Console on February 26, 2014, the first being released in Japan only while the Wii U Virtual Console version was released on April 6, 2017 in the United States.

== Gameplay ==
TurboGrafx-16 version screenshot

The game includes a variety of weapons including flamethrowers, electricity, spread guns and heat-seeking missiles. It consists of eight levels.

== Plot ==
Taking place four years after Star Soldier, the original galactic invaders known as the Star Brain corps have returned from their crushing defeat from the Cesear star fighter and they are now led by the ultimate spaceship, Mother Brain. Earth's only defense lies in the Neo Cesear star fighter to finish what was started.

== Reception ==
Reception

Review scores
Publication	Score
Computer and Video Games	89%
Electronic Gaming Monthly	7/10, 8/10, 7/10, 6/10
Eurogamer	3/5
Famitsu	8/10, 9/10, 9/10, 7/10
GameSpot	6.2/10
Games-X	76%
Gekkan PC Engine	90/100, 85/100, 95/100, 95/100, 80/100
IGN	7.5/10
Joystick	94%
Marukatsu PC Engine	9/10, 8/10, 9/10, 9/10
Nintendo Life	7/10
Player One	93/100
The Games Machine (UK)	66%
Tilt	16/20
VideoGames & Computer Entertainment	6/10
Amstar	13/20
Micro News	5/5
Power Play	70%
TurboPlay	4/5

The Japanese publication Micom BASIC Magazine ranked Super Star Soldier first in popularity in its September 1990 issue, and it received a 23.07/30 score in a 1993 readers' poll conducted by PC Engine Fan, ranking among PC Engine titles at the number 85 spot. The game received generally favorable reviews from critics.

== Legacy ==
Artist Perry "Rozyrg" Sessions cited Super Star Soldier as one of the main influences for Super XYX.
