= Hudson Soft =

Japanese video game development and publishing company

Hudson Soft Co., Ltd.

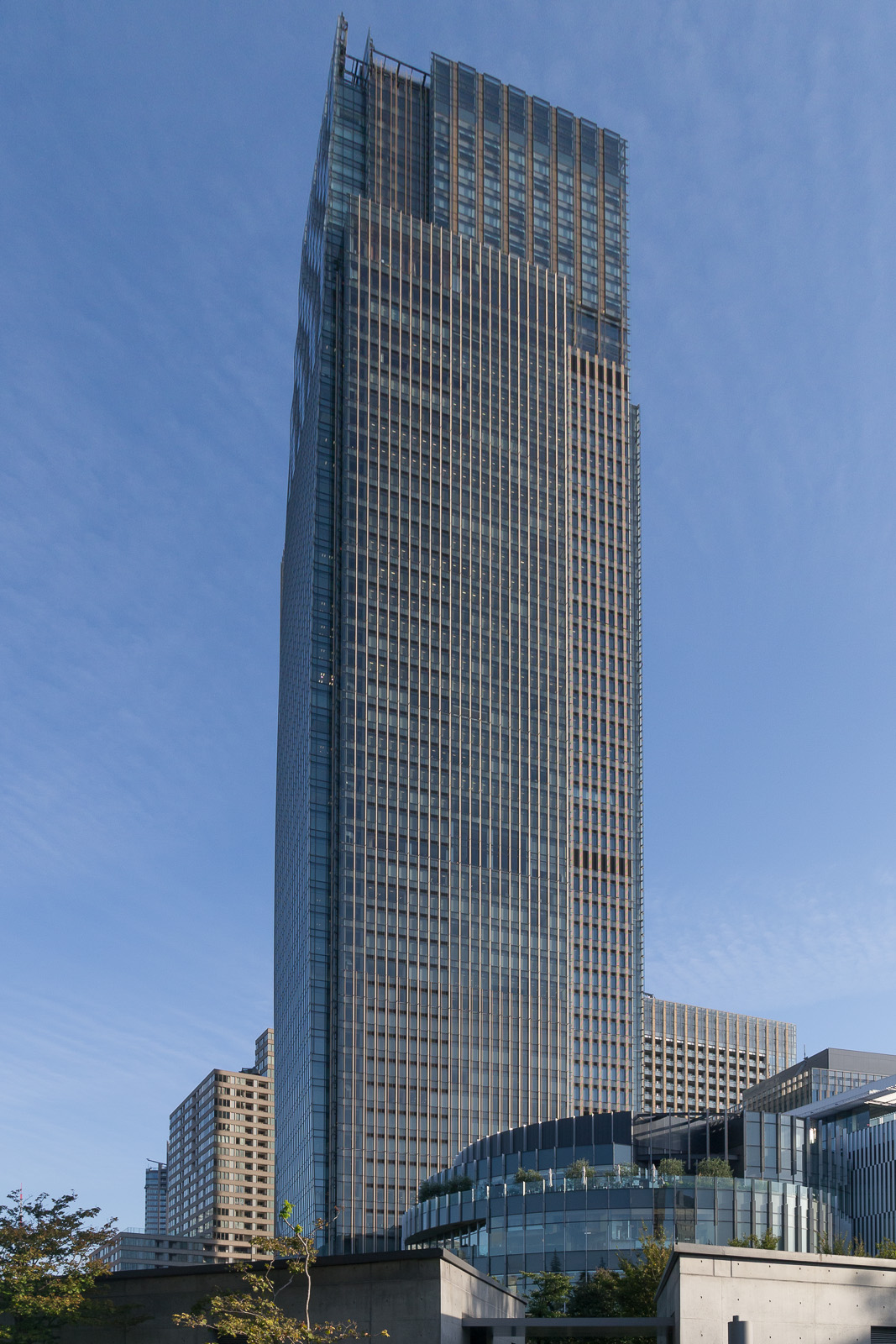
- The Midtown Tower, Hudson Soft's final headquarters in Minato, Tokyo
- Native name: 株式会社ハドソン
- Romanized name: Kabushiki gaisha Hadoson
- Type: Subsidiary
- Traded as: JASDAQ: 4822 (2000–2011)
- Industry: Video games
- Founded: May 18, 1973; 53 years ago
- Founders: Yuji Kudo; Hiroshi Kudo
- Defunct: March 1, 2012; 14 years ago
- Fate: Merged with Konami Digital Entertainment
- Successor: Konami Digital Entertainment
- Headquarters: Midtown Tower, Akasaka, Minato, Japan
- Number of locations: 2 studios (2012)
- Key people: Takahashi Meijin; Shinichi Nakamoto; Shigeki Fujiwara; Akira Sakuma; Kazuhiko Uehara (President 2011‒2012)
- Products: List of Hudson Soft games TurboGrafx-16; TurboExpress; PC-FX
- Total equity: ▼¥300 million (2011)
- Owner: Shareholders: Konami (54%, 2005-2011); Osaka Securities Finance (2.4%, 2011); Barclays (1.4%, 2011); Nintendo (1%, 2011)
- Number of employees: 421 (2011)
- Parent: Konami (2011-2012)

Hudson Soft Co., Ltd. (Note: Japanese: 株式会社ハドソン, Hepburn: Kabushiki gaisha Hadoson) was a Japanese video game developer that released numerous titles across video game consoles, home computers, and mobile phones. Headquartered in the Midtown Tower in Tokyo, it also maintained an office in the Hudson Building in Sapporo and an American subsidiary in San Mateo, California. Founded on May 18, 1973, Hudson initially focused on personal computer products before expanding into video game development, publishing, peripherals, and music production.

The company produced Bomberman, Adventure Island, Star Soldier, Bonk, and Bloody Roar. It also developed games for other publishers, such as the Mario Party series for Nintendo. Hudson partnered with NEC to create the TurboGrafx-16, TurboExpress, and PC-FX consoles, aiming to compete with Nintendo, Sega, SNK, Atari, Philips, and Sony while continuing to release games on other platforms as a third-party developer.

Hudson Soft became a publicly traded company in 2000. In 2005, Konami acquired a 55% controlling stake in Hudson, later purchasing the company outright on April 1, 2011. On March 1, 2012, Hudson merged with Konami Digital Entertainment, which retains its game catalog and periodically re-releases Hudson's classic titles.

== History ==
Hudson Soft Ltd. was founded in Toyohira-ku, Sapporo, Japan, on May 18, 1973, by brothers Yuji and Hiroshi Kudo. The founders grew up admiring trains and named the business after one that regularly passed their childhood home, their favourite the Hudson locomotives (called the "4-6-4", and especially the Japanese C62). The company's mascot was a bee named Hachisuke, a reference to the company's origins in amateur radio. In Japanese, hachi means both 'eight' and 'bee,' and the radio call sign for Hokkaido is JA8.

Hudson began as an amateur radio shop called CQ Hudson (CQハドソン), selling radio telecommunications devices and art photographs. Yuji Kudo had originally planned to start a coffee shop, but there was already one in the same building, resulting in the decision to change to a wireless radio shop at the eleventh hour. Although the Kudo brothers had university education, neither had studied in business management. That factor, combined with the difficulty to find trustworthy people to accompany the Kudos in their venture, meant that Hudson was almost always in the red each month during its era exclusively as a radio shop.

In September 1975, Hudson began selling personal computer-related products and in March 1978 started developing and selling video game packages from a dedicated store called COSMOS Sapporo on the second floor of the CQ Hudson building in Hiragishi. At that time, many amateur radio shops were switching to the sales of personal computers because they deal with the same electronic equipment. CQ Hudson would continue to operate for decades in Sapporo until Hudson Soft closed the shop in May 2001.

In the late 1970s and early 1980s, Hudson Soft favoured a quantity-over-quality approach for the marketing of video games. At one point, the company released up to 30 different computer software titles per month; none of which were hugely successful. Things changed in late 1983, when Hudson started to prioritise quality-over-quantity. Hudson became Nintendo's first third-party software vendor for the Family Computer and its title for this console, Lode Runner, sold 1.2 million units after its 1984 release.

The business continued developing video games on the Famicom and computer platforms (MSX, NEC PC-8801 and ZX Spectrum, among others). Bomberman was released in December of this year on the Famicom and was considered a "big hit" by Hudson Soft.

In July 1987, Hudson developed the "C62 System" and collaborated with NEC to develop the PC Engine video game console. It achieved a second-best success to Famicom in Japan, but its release as the TurboGrafx-16 in North America had less market share than the new Super Nintendo Entertainment System and Sega Genesis. In 1990, Hudson Soft developed and published video games for an array of systems. In 1994, the 32-bit semiconductor chip "HuC62" was independently developed by Hudson and used in NEC's PC-FX video game console.

In 2000, Hudson worked with Infogrames in a joint venture as Infogrames-Hudson. In 2004, Hudson started a joint venture with Flying Tiger Entertainment for 25 titles.

Hudson Soft relocated its main office to the Midtown Tower in Tokyo in 2005, although the Sapporo headquarters remained in operation as a secondary office.

Hudson Soft lost several key people starting in the mid-2000s. Co-founder Hiroshi Kudo left the company in November 2004 following financial losses. Shinichi Nakamoto, who was with the company since 1978 and creator of the Bomberman series, followed suit in 2006. Veteran Takahashi Meijin resigned in May 2011; he had joined Hudson Soft in 1982. Around 2010–2011, many employees migrated to Nintendo's restructured Nd Cube subsidiary which was headed by Hidetoshi Endo, himself a former Hudson Soft president.

=== Relationship with Konami ===
The relation between Hudson Soft and Konami can be traced to at least as early as 1985, when Hudson ported Konami's arcade game Pooyan to the MSX and Family Computer. However, the acquisition process of Hudson Soft by Konami would only begin in 2001.

Hudson Soft was severely hit by the collapse of its main bank Hokkaido Takushoku. Seeking new financing alternatives, Hudson Soft entered the stock market for the first time in December 2000, listing on the NASDAQ Japan Exchange. This led to Konami purchasing a stock allocation of 5.6 million shares in August 2001, becoming the company's largest shareholder. Within the terms of this purchase, Hudson acquired the Sapporo division of Konami Computer Entertainment Studio, renaming it Hudson Studio.

In April 2005, capital was increased via an allocation of 3 million shares from a third party. Konami Corporation, holding 53.99% of all Hudson stock, became Hudson's controlling shareholder. Hudson Soft continued to publish video games while working closely with Konami, who became Hudson's distributor in Japan. In November 2007, Hudson signed a distribution deal with Konami's European branch.

On January 20, 2011, Konami announced its intention to acquire the rest of Hudson Soft and make it a wholly owned subsidiary; the transaction closed on April 1, 2011. Its American subsidiary, Hudson Entertainment, was liquidated in the process.

On March 1, 2012, Hudson Soft merged with Konami Digital Entertainment, with its music business absorbed into KME Corporation. The move was not a unilateral decision from Konami, but rather a voluntary merger agreed by the two subsidiaries during a board meeting held on January 12, 2012. The main reason given for the merger was the consolidation of the operations between Hudson and KDE into a single company.

Despite the demise of Hudson Soft, Konami had planned for products to continue being developed and offered under the Hudson brand. The Hudson website was even initially retained and maintained by Konami. By early 2014, however, Konami had retired the website. The pre-2005 headquarters of Hudson Soft in Sapporo continued to operate as a branch of Konami well after the absorption until it closed in 2014. In 2015, Konami sold the Sapporo building that had long been the headquarters of Hudson Soft.

== Caravan competitions ==
On a yearly basis from 1985 to 2000, and sporadically since, Hudson Soft has held a games competition across Japan known as the "Hudson All-Japan Caravan Festival". Most years the competition focused around a single game, with all of the initial years of 1985 to 1992 except 1988 being shoot 'em ups. During these years, the Caravan can be seen as a hallmark of Hudson's popularity. Later Caravans were less popular and featured less punishing games. Several of these later Caravans focused on Hudson Soft's popular Bomberman series.

Many of the early shoot 'em up games used for the Caravan competition included two-minute and five-minute modes built into the cartridges, to allow potential competitors to practice prior to the competitions.

- 1985 – Star Force for the Famicom became the first game featured for the summer competitions held within Japan.
- 1986 – Star Soldier for the Famicom became the second competition game.
- 1987 – Starship Hector (In Japan, simply Hector '87) was the third and last Famicom game featured as the Hudson Caravan moved onto the newer PC Engine. The first three were reproduced in Hudson Caravan Collection for the Super Famicom and Hudson Best Collection for the Game Boy Advance
- 1988 – Power League (World Class Baseball in the USA) became the first PC Engine competition game, unusual for the competition being a sports game rather than a shooter.
- 1989 – Gunhed (Blazing Lazers) for the PC Engine was the competition game. A small number of cartridges were produced for the competition under the name Gunhed Taikai (Special Edition) and are very rare and expensive for the most hardcore of collectors to find.
- 1990 – Super Star Soldier for the PC Engine
- 1991 – Final Soldier for the PC Engine
- 1992 – Soldier Blade for the PC Engine would be the last of the popular caravan competitions as later events were held using the more casual Bomberman and other games fittingly popular at the time. The PC Engine games from '90, '91, and '92 were re-released as the PC Engine Best Collection – Soldier Collection for the PSP.

== Subsidiaries ==
=== Hudson Studio ===
A division located in Sapporo. Originally formed as a division of Konami Computer Entertainment Studio, it was acquired by Hudson on July 26, 2001.

=== Hudson Soft USA ===
Hudson Soft's first North American publishing division, formed in 1988 and originally headquartered in South San Francisco, California. The first video games it planned to publish were Adventure Island, Milon's Secret Castle, Bomberman, and Starship Hector for the Nintendo Entertainment System.

In late 1995, Hudson Soft USA sold off the rights for all of its yet-to-be-released games to Acclaim Entertainment and moved its headquarters to Seattle, Washington, before closing down by the end of the year.

=== Hudson Soft Europe ===
On July 25, 1991, Hudson Soft Europe GmbH was established in Hamburg, Germany.

=== Hudson Entertainment, Inc. ===
Hudson Soft's second North American publishing division, reestablished by John Brandstetter of Flying Tiger and formed in November 2003 as the successor to Hudson Soft USA and headquartered in Brea, California at Flying Tiger's Headquarters. Then it was moved to San Mateo, California. It had a division for mobile games and another for console video games.

On July 23, 2003, Hudson Soft announced the start of its North American mobile phone Java game service, GameMaster, which was created by Flying Tiger for AT&T's mMode, and NTT DoCoMo effective on July 28, 2003.

Hudson Entertainment ceased operations on March 31, 2011, after Konami's acquisition of the parent company.

=== Hudson Music Entertainment ===
Hudson Soft's music recording label unit. Absorbed on March 1, 2012, into KME Corporation, the music subsidiary of Konami Digital Entertainment.

== Video game releases ==
Hudson Soft is responsible for series such as Bomberman, Bonk, Star Soldier, and Adventure Island.

Hudson also released a long-running and popular video game series in Japan. Far East of Eden was a classic RPG set in a fictionalized feudal Japan. The series was up to its fourth main entry when Hudson was absorbed into Konami. The second entry in the series was widely regarded as one of the best RPGs ever released, ranked 12th by Famitsu among all games released in Japan. Hudson Soft also created the long-running and critically acclaimed Momotaro Dentetsu series, a board game-style video game centered around business transactions. 16 games in the series released in Japan. Before its absorption, Hudson had re-released some of its first hit games for the GameCube in Japan, including Adventure Island, Star Soldier, and Lode Runner.

Hudson had a long history of creating games for other companies. The most notable of these were the Mario Party games, which it developed for Nintendo. They developed the first eight console installments and two handheld spin-offs; however, due to Hudson being acquired by Konami, Mario Party 9 and all games after that have been developed by Nintendo subsidiary NDcube, which consists of many former Hudson employees. Hudson also developed Fuzion Frenzy 2 for Microsoft, which was released for the Xbox 360 in January 2007. Bomberman 64: The Second Attack was published by Vatical Entertainment, unlike the former two games on the Nintendo 64 which were both published by Nintendo.
