= Sylphia (video game) =

1993 video game

- Developer: Compile
- Publisher: Tonkin House
- Director: Junichi Nagatsuma
- Producer: Ikuro Urai
- Programmer: Shinichi Nogami
- Artist: Kōji Teramoto
- Composers: Keiji Takeuchi; Satoshi Shimazaki
- Platform: PC Engine Super CD-ROM²
- Release: JP: October 22, 1993
- Genre: Vertically scrolling shooter
- Mode: Single-player

Sylphia (Note: Japanese: シルフィア, Hepburn: Shirufia) is a 1993 vertically scrolling shooter video game developed by Compile and published in Japan by Tonkin House for the PC Engine Super CD-ROM². Unlike many shooting games of the era which take place in a science fiction setting, this game mixes heroic fantasy and ancient Greek mythology. The game follows Silphia, a maiden warrior reincarnated as a demigoddess under Zeus after her death in battle, who faces the forces of Hades, who has been possessed and manipulated by creatures once imprisoned in Tartaros.

Its gameplay is similar to previous Compile shooters, with the player fighting enemies and bosses while avoiding their projectiles and other obstacles. Directed by Junichi Nagatsuma and produced by Ikuro Urai, the title was the last shooter by Compile until Zanac X Zanac (2001) and had a limited release. It received mixed reviews from critics.

== Gameplay ==
Gameplay screenshot of the first stage in Sylphia.

Sylphia is set in a classical Greek setting, during a time when gods and humans coexisted. Hades, god of the underworld, falls under the influence of monsters once defeated by the gods on account of a mysterious mask, and begins sending those monsters out to ransack and dominate the land above, forcing the gods to retreat to Mount Olympus. The game stars a Hellenic woman named Silphia whose city is attacked by these underworld forces. The young maiden warrior is reincarnated as a demigoddess under Zeus after her demise in battle, tasked with destroying the monstrous armies and putting an end to Hades' madness. She is given wings similar to a dragonfly, allowing her to fly. She must then free the rest of the Greek world from the forces of Hades, facing off against mythological figures including giants, a Minotaur, a griffin, and Talos.

The game is a vertical-scrolling shooter where players control a flying woman (rather than a spaceship, which is typical of the genre). Its gameplay is similar to previous shooters by Compile. The player controls Silphia through eight stages featuring a constantly scrolling background populated with enemy forces and obstacles. The scenery never stops moving until a boss is reached, which must be defeated to progress. Each stage includes a mid-boss and an end boss.

Silphia has a main weapon that can be powered up by collecting power-up items. She can also obtain four different special weapons based on the four classical elements, which affect her shooting method. These can be upgraded by collecting the same weapon currently in use or by collecting power-ups. Silphia can also execute a powerful lightning beam attack, but it must be charged by collecting crystals after being unleashed. Getting hit by enemy fire or colliding with solid stage obstacles decreases Silphia's health. A game is over once her health is depleted, though the player has the option to continue, which decreases Silphia's firepower to its original state.

== Development and release ==
Sylphia was developed by Compile, which had previously created Seirei Senshi Spriggan and Spriggan Mark 2: Re-Terraform Project for the PC Engine. Despite many Compile staff members working on the project, the company's name is not mentioned in the credits. It was directed by Junichi Nagatsuma and produced by Ikuro Urai. Shinichi Nogami served as the sole programmer. Kōji "Janus" Teramoto acted as co-graphic artist alongside Aya "Riu" Shimazaki, Hideo Hotta, Neko Koneko, Shōji Mizumoto, Shunsuke Takashima, and Tenji Satō. The soundtrack was composed by Einosuke Nagao, Katsumi Tanaka, Keiji Takeuchi (of Spriggan Mark 2), Satoshi Shimazaki (of Robo Aleste), and Tsuyoshi Matsushima. Takayuki Hirono served as a game system adviser.

The game was first unveiled in a fifty to sixty percent complete state at the Makuhari Messe convention center. The title was published in Japan by Tonkin House for the PC Engine Super CD-ROM² on October 22, 1993. The game has become a rare collector's item commanding high prices on the secondary market, alongside other PC Engine shooting games such as Ginga Fukei Densetsu Sapphire, Steam Heart's, Rayxanber II or Rayxanber III. It was the last shooter by Compile until Zanac X Zanac (2001).

== Reception ==
Reception

Review scores
Publication	Score
Famitsu	8/10, 4/10, 7/10, 6/10
Gekkan PC Engine	85/100, 75/100, 85/100, 75/100, 80/100
Dengeki PC Engine	60/100, 65/100, 60/100, 55/100
Hippon Super!	6/10

Sylphia received mixed reception from contemporary critics and retrospective commentators. Readers of PC Engine Fan gave the game a 18.1 out of 30 score in a 1998 public poll. Famitsu''s four reviewers noted its "flashy" enemies and stages but labelled it a "mess" to play. German magazine Video Games highlighted the game alongside Fray in Magical Adventure CD and Strip Fighter 2 as import games that could be enjoyed with little knowledge of Japanese. They stated that the game did little new for the genre but praised the music.

Eurogamer's Tom Massey described the game as "...so easy on defaults you can clear it on a credit with one eye closed and an arm tied behind your back. Certainly fun for a twice over, its difficulty to acquire and above average presentation continues to make it highly sought after." Hardcore Gaming 101's Kurt Kalata highlighted its Greek setting, music, and boss fights. Nevertheless, Kalata opined that "it's a pretty good game, but there's not much else that stands out about it. It lacks the fierce bombast of MUSHA and the weapon variety of Space Megaforce."
