= Rayxanber III =

1992 video game

- Developer: Data West
- Publisher: Data West
- Producer: Naokazu Akita
- Designer: Kazuhide Nakamura
- Programmers: Yoshiyuki Washizu; Yukinori Taniguchi
- Artist: Takeharu Igarashi
- Composer: Yasuhito Saito
- Series: Rayxanber
- Platform: PC Engine Super CD-ROM²
- Release: JP: June 26, 1992
- Genre: Scrolling shooter
- Mode: Single-player

Rayxanber III (Note: Japanese: ライザンバーIII, Hepburn: Raizanbā III) is a horizontally scrolling shooter video game developed and published by Data West and released in 1992 for the PC Engine Super CD-ROM². It is a follow-up to Rayxanber II, which was released earlier in 1991 for the PC Engine CD-ROM², and the last entry in the Rayxanber trilogy. In the game, the player assumes the role of a fighter pilot controlling the ES3 Donner Kyle space craft deployed into the homeworld of the Zoul Empire, in retaliation for the destruction of a mother ship from Earth. It retains the same gameplay as its predecessors, with the players fighting against an assortment of enemy forces while avoiding collision with their projectiles and other obstacles.

Rayxanber III was created by Team 50, a group within Data West responsible for the Rayxanber trilogy, with Kazuhide Nakamura reprising his role as designer. The soundtrack was scored by Yasuhito Saito, who composed for the previous games in the trilogy, and worked on titles such as Layla and The 4th Unit series. An English localization was slated to be published by Turbo Technologies, but it never materialized. The game was anticipated by Japanese players, but garnered mixed reception from critics who reviewed it as an import title. Retrospective commentary has been more positive, being considered one of the best games for the PC Engine and one of the most important shooting titles on the platform.

== Gameplay ==
Gameplay screenshot.

Rayxanber III is a science fiction-themed horizontally scrolling shooter game reminiscent of R-Type, in which the player takes control of a fighter pilot controlling the ES3 Donner Kyle space craft deployed into the homeworld of the Zoul Empire, in retaliation for the destruction of a mother ship from Earth. Gameplay is overhauled but follows the same structure as its predecessors, with the player controlling the ship through six increasingly difficult stages over a constantly scrolling background, populated with an assortment of alien enemy forces and obstacles, and the scenery never stops moving until a boss is reached, which must be fought to progress further.

There are three types of weapon units in the game the player can acquire by collecting their respective colors dropped by carriers when shot down and alternate between each one by obtaining another weapon during gameplay. Each weapon can be powered-up before they are maxed out, and collecting any weapon unit equips the ship with a set of two satellite-like options that fire at the specific direction the unit, which is constantly rotating, faces before being obtained. The ship is also capable of performing a dash maneuver to evade incoming enemy fire or obstacles. New to the series is the addition of a secondary charge attack that shoots two missiles to obliterate enemies, while double-tapping the fire button breaks them into homing missiles.

Like previous Rayxanber entries, the title employs a checkpoint system in which a downed player will start off at the beginning of the checkpoint they managed to reach before dying. Getting hit by enemy fire or colliding against solid stage obstacles will result in losing a life, as well as a penalty of decreasing the ship's firepower and loss of the weapon that was currently in use, and the game is over once all lives are lost, though the player has unlimited continues to keep playing.

== Development and release ==
Rayxanber III was developed by Team 50, a group within Data West responsible for the original Rayxanber (1990) for FM Towns and Rayxanber II (1991) for the PC Engine CD-ROM². Kazuhide Nakamura reprised his role as designer and Naokazu Akita led its creation as producer. Yoshiyuki Washizu and Yukinori Taniguchi acted as co-programmers, while artist Takeharu Igarashi was responsible for the pixel art. The soundtrack was scored by Yasuhito Saito, who also composed for the previous entries in the Rayxanber trilogy, and worked on titles such as Layla and The 4th Unit series. The game was published in Japan by Data West on June 26, 1992, for the PC Engine Super CD-ROM². An English localization was slated to be published by Turbo Technologies in December 1992 and showcased at the 1992 Summer Consumer Electronics Show, but it never materialized. In a 2020 interview with Japanese gaming website DenFaminicoGamer, a Data West representative commented that there were no current plans for a digital re-release of the Rayxanber series through their official online store, but would consider it if there is demand.

== Reception ==
Reception

Review scores
Publication	Score
Consoles +	70%
Gekkan PC Engine	85/100, 80/100, 85/100, 85/100, 80/100
Joypad	80%
Joystick	87%
Marukatsu PC Engine	6/10, 6/10, 6/10, 7/10
Mega Fun	76/100

Rayxanber III was anticipated by Japanese players, but received mixed reception from critics who reviewed it as an import title. Mega Fun's Christian Schweitzer praised the game's graphics, sound and fun factor, but criticized aspects such as the "jerky" framerate, collision detection issues and high difficulty level, feeling that it did not came close to Gate of Thunder. Nevertheless, Schweitzer regarded it as one of the best games on the PC Engine. Video Games' Julian Eggebrecht labeled it as a mediocre and superfluous title for shoot 'em up fans, citing the lack of frills with new ideas as its main shortcoming, while stating that it heavily stole from R-Type "without achieving its brilliance."

Consoles Plus' Douglas Alves and Doguy commended the visuals, animations, music and playability, but criticized its presentation, sound effects and low difficulty. Both reviewers ultimately found it to be a well-realized but easy shoot 'em up below other shooters for the PC Engine like Gate of Thunder and Seirei Senshi Spriggan. Joypad's Alain Huyghues-Lacour and Jean-François Morisse compared it with Gate of Thunder, criticizing its stages for their short length and lack of variety, but gave positive remarks to the game's fast pacing and controls. Joystick's Jean-Marc Demoly wrote that "Rayxanber III is a very good shooting game, inferior all the same to Gate Of Thunder, which remains as reference in this field. DuoWorld's Victor Ireland regarded it as a letdown compared to Rayxanber II, noting the "look alike" stages, colors, limited parallax scrolling and lack of imagination.

=== Retrospective coverage ===
Retrospective commentaries for Rayxanber III has been more positive. IGN Italia's Andrea Corritore identified the game as one of the most important shooting games on the PC Engine, alongside Gate of Thunder, Lords of Thunder and Ginga Fukei Densetsu Sapphire. Neil Salvemini of SHMUPS! (a classic network of GameSpy) praised the detailed visuals similar to Metal Black, sound and playability. Salvemini also expressed that "this entire game seems to be a little too Treasure-esque" due to its fast action. David Borrachero and Antxiko of Spanish magazine RetroManiac regarded both Rayxanber III and its predecessor as two of the best games on the PC Engine platform, noting the need of memorizing stage patterns in a similar fashion to R-Type. They also commended both visuals and playability for being "exceptional", as well as the soundtrack for taking advantage of the CD-ROM format. Hardcore Gaming 101's John Sczepaniak wrote that "It took DataWest two attempts and three years to finally create a truly quality shooter, and it's damned excellent." Sczepaniak praised the overhauled gameplay, balanced design, introduction of a secondary attack, fair difficulty, visual aesthetic and music. Regardless, he criticized the level themes for limiting the game's color palette.
