= Sorcer Striker =

1993 video game

- Developer: Raizing
- Publisher: Able Corporation
- Designer: Kazuyuki Nakashima
- Programmer: Yuichi Toyama
- Artist: Kenichi Yokoo
- Composer: Atsuhiro Motoyama
- Platforms: Arcade, FM Towns, X68000
- Release: JP/EU: May 1993
- Genre: Vertically scrolling shooter
- Modes: Single-player, multiplayer

Sorcer Striker (Note: Also known as Mahou Daisakusen (Japanese: 魔法大作戦(まほうだいさくせん), Hepburn: Mahō Daisakusen; lit. "Magic Armageddon") in Japan.) is a 1993 vertically scrolling shooter arcade video game developed by Raizing (now known as Eighting) and published in 1993 by Able Corporation in Japan and Europe. In the game, players assume the role from one of the four bounty hunters to overthrow the Goblin empire led by King Gobligan and reclaim the bounty placed by King Codwenna of Violent Kingdom over Gobligan's head. It is the first entry in the Mahō Daisakusen trilogy, which includes Kingdom Grand Prix and Dimahoo, and the first video game to be created by Raizing.

Sorcer Striker served as the debut project of Raizing, a development company founded by former Naxat Soft and Compile staff who previously worked on the Aleste series. Though first released in arcades, the game was later ported to other platforms, each one featuring various changes compared to the original version and has since been re-released for PlayStation 4 in Japan as part of the M2 ShotTriggers label by M2.

== Gameplay ==
Arcade screenshot

Sorcer Striker is a science fantasy-themed vertical-scrolling shoot 'em up game reminiscent of Seirei Senshi Spriggan, where players assume the role of one of the four playable characters (Gain, Chitta, Miyamoto and Bonum) through six increasingly difficult stages. The plot involves a goblin movement successfully establishing an empire of their own, prompting King Codwenna of Violent Kingdom in gathering his knights to launch a disastrous attack against the Goblins. King Codwenna learned that the Goblins were ruled by a human leader and the mass production of mana-based magical weapons, which shocked Codwenna as nobody succeeded in reproducing them and their operation were limited and not fully understood. Foreshadowing the doom of his kingdom and the failure of his knight order, Codwenna placed a bounty on the head of King Gobligan, waiting for the arrival of a hero to save them.

The gameplay borrows elements from previous Compile shooters, as players control their ship over a scrolling background until a boss is reached. Each ship is equipped with two weapons; the main gun is powered-up by obtaining coins from "P" bags, while the subweapon can be swapped or power-up by acquiring one of the three magic books by destroying incoming carriers, ranging from homing shots to spread shots and a straight shot, however the use of each subweapon alternates between characters. Players are also equipped with bombs capable of obliterating any enemy within its blast radius.

Similar to MUSHA, players will occasionally fight against a miniboss on certain stages of the game. The title uses a respawn system where players, upon losing a life, continue immediately at the same location. Getting hit by enemy fire or colliding against solid stage obstacles will result in losing a life, as well as a reversion of the ship's firepower to its original state; once all lives are lost, the game is over unless the players insert more credits into the arcade machine to continue playing. After completing the first loop, the game returns to the first stage; completing the second loop achieves the true ending.

== Development ==
Sorcer Striker was first project to be developed by Raizing (now Eighting), a Japanese video game developer founded by former Naxat Soft and Compile staff who previously worked on the Aleste series. Its development was helmed by a crew of approximately four members with designer Kazuyuki Nakashima, Seirei Senshi Spriggan programmer Yuichi Toyama, artist Kenichi Yokoo and then-27 years old freelance composer Atsuhiro Motoyama, with the team recounting its creation process and history through various Japanese publications.

Early concept art. Sorcer Striker was originally envisioned as a shoot 'em up game with a Chinese martial arts thematic, before being ultimately reworked into a fantasy-themed shooter project instead.

Toyama wanted to develop an arcade project after working on both Senshi Spriggan and Spriggan mark2: Re-Terraform Project, as the team were discussing what to make when Raizing was first founded. Due to his president's connection with Toaplan as a former employee, Toyama decided to work on an arcade game with Toaplan providing consultance and advising to the team, as well as licensing their arcade board for launch. Sorcer Striker entered development in March 1992 with the staff working on the bedroom of an apartment using development tools from Toaplan, initially envisionsed as a Chinese martial arts-themed shoot 'em up under the working title Haougekiden Saifuaa, (Note: 覇王撃伝砕破 (Haōgekiden Saifuā, lit. "Dynasty Shooting Legend – Blast!")) but Tatsuya Uemura and other members of Toaplan advised the team that shooter games need a worldwide appeal and the project was ultimately revised into a fantasy-themed shoot 'em up approachable for any skill level to attract RPG players on consoles. The power-up system was modelled after MUSHA, as Yokoo was a fan of the game. To portray the player's shots and explosions more flashier, the team introduced mecha elements into their design and aimed for a steampunk-esque aesthetic.

Ship designs were given hand-like extremities as the team wanted to give them character; Yokoo stated that said designs also served as an experiment to determine if they could merge the ship's operability and personality together to avoid gameplay interference with their hitbox, while the samurai dragon Miyamoto was used as a test to determine reaction towards a humanoid "ship" from players. The team also wanted to emphasize a sense of story, making the playable characters speak at the beginning and end of stages. Gain, whose name derived from the character Gainshain in Shunji Enomoto's Golden Lucky manga, was designed with a tough and muscular look as the team thought of preferences from arcade players at the time, with Yokoo stating that adding his monkey companion gave him more character. Chitta, whose name derived from the "Cinechitta" movie theatre at Kawasaki near Raizing's then-offices at Kamada, was intended to be a "moe" magical girl and the team made her perform stuff such as idol concerts, but Yokoo said that "it seemed it really didn't have the effect we were hoping for". Bonum was named after bones and his name is a reference to the character Bornnam from the first part of Hirohiko Araki's JoJo's Bizarre Adventure. Other characters were inspired by Wizardry.

Deciding on the game's final name prior to launch proved difficult for the team, as Sorcer Striker was first titled Mahou Daisensou (Note: 魔法大戦争 (Mahō Daisensō, lit. "Great Magic War")) in Japan but the release of Irem's In the Hunt (Note: Known in Japan as 海底大戦争 (Kaitei Daisensō, lit. "Undersea War").) prompted a long brainstorming session that resulted with Mahou Daisakusen being chosen out of more than a hundred suggestions. Nakashima claimed that due to their development environment at the time, the team was ultimately able to produce a "very strong, colorful game".

== Release ==
Sorcer Striker was first released in arcades by Able Corporation across Japan and Europe in May 1993, using a Toaplan-licensed arcade board. In 1994, a CD music album containing was first published exclusively in Japan by Shinseisha. An officially endorsed manga adaptation by Raizing was also published by Shinseisha on the same year. The game was first ported to the X68000 and published by Electronic Arts Victor on 16 December 1994, featuring a number of options such as MIDI support. The title was then ported to the FM Towns and published by Electronic Arts Victor in February 1995, with Red Book audio based on the X68000 version but featuring a lower frame rate and missing special effects. In 2005, it was later ported to mobile phone platforms such as EZweb by Eighting. In November 2017, M2 released a new version of Sorcer Striker as part of their M2 ShotTriggers publishing label for PlayStation 4. This version includes a number of exclusive additions such as an easier difficulty setting and the ability to play with two aircraft simultaneously in single-player.

== Reception and legacy ==
Reception

Review scores
Publication	Score
Famitsu	(PS4) 29/40
Oh!X	(X68K) 9/10

According to Yuichi Toyama, Sorcer Striker did not perform poorly. In Japan, Game Machine listed it on their August 1, 1993 issue as being the seventh most-popular arcade game at the time. Richard Löwenstein of German magazine Amiga Joker drew comparison with Truxton. The X68000 version was met with positive reception. GameSetWatch's Todd Ciolek noted that the game "didn't quite stand out as much as the Aleste series had". In a 2010 interview, composer Manabu Namiki regarded Sorcer Striker as one of the shoot 'em up games he enjoys the most. Hardcore Gaming 101's Kurt Kalata regarded it to be "an excellent game, though one that tends to be forgotten in favor of Raizing's more innovative and ambitious titles". Famitsu gave the PlayStation 4 version an overall 25 out of 40 score.

Sorcer Striker was the first entry in the Mahō Daisakusen trilogy. A sequel, Kingdom Grand Prix, was first released for arcades in 1994 before being published on Sega Saturn in 1996 by GAGA Communications as a Japan-exclusive release. A third entry, Dimahoo, was only released for arcades by Capcom in 2000. Gain, Chitta, Miyamoto and Bonum would re-appear as guest characters in both Battle Garegga and Armed Police Batrider.
