= Rayxanber II =

1991 video game

- Developer: Data West
- Publisher: Data West
- Producer: Naokazu Akita
- Designer: Kazuhide Nakamura
- Programmers: Fumio Minami; Yoshiyuki Washizu
- Artist: Takeharu Igarashi
- Composer: Yasuhito Saito
- Series: Rayxanber
- Platform: PC Engine CD-ROM²
- Release: JP: June 7, 1991
- Genre: Horizontally scrolling shooter
- Mode: Single-player

Rayxanber II (Note: Japanese: ライザンバーII, Hepburn: Raizanbā II) is a 1991 horizontally scrolling shooter video game developed and published by Data West for the PC Engine CD-ROM². It is the sequel to Rayxanber, which was released earlier in 1990 for the FM Towns. In the game, the player assumes the role of a fighter pilot controlling the Eliminate Scanner AD space craft to protect Earth against an alien invasion led by the returning Zoul Empire. The title was created by Team 50, a group within Data West that previously worked on the first entry for FM Towns. The music was scored by Yasuhito Saito, who composed for the original entry and also worked on titles such as Layla and The 4th Unit series.

Rayxanber II became a success when it released in Japan but garnered mixed reception from critics, including French publications reviewing it as an import title; praise was given to the visuals, audio, controls, introduction of various innovations into its gameplay and longevity, but most noted its difficulty and criticized its presentation. Retrospective commentary have been equally mixed, some of which found it to be an improvement over its predecessor but concurred in regards to its high difficulty nature. A follow-up, Rayxanber III, was released for the PC Engine Super CD-ROM² in 1992.

== Gameplay ==
Screenshot of the game's first stage.

Rayxanber II is a science fiction-themed horizontal-scrolling shooter game reminiscent of R-Type, in which the player takes control of a fighter pilot controlling the Eliminate Scanner AD space craft to protect Earth against an alien invasion led by the returning Zoul Empire. It retains the same gameplay as its predecessor, as the player controls the ship through six increasingly difficult stages over a constantly scrolling background, populated with an assortment of alien enemy forces and obstacles, and the scenery never stops moving until a boss is reached, which must be fought in order to progress further.

There are three types of weapon units in the game the player can acquire by collecting their respective colors when dropped by carriers when shot down and alternate between each one by obtaining another weapon during gameplay, ranging from fire (red), lightning (green), and multi-directional laser (blue). Each weapon can be powered-up before they are maxed out and collecting any weapon unit also equips the ship with a set of two satellite-like options that fire at the specific direction the unit, which is constantly rotating, faces before being obtained. By holding down the attack button, the player can charge the ship's cannon to unleash a more powerful blast against enemies. The ship is also capable of performing a dash maneuver to evade incoming enemy fire or obstacles.

As with the original Rayxanber, the title employs a checkpoint system in which a downed player will start off at the beginning of the checkpoint they managed to reach before dying. Getting hit by enemy fire or colliding against solid stage obstacles will result in losing a live, as well as a penalty of decreasing the ship's firepower and loss of the weapon that was currently in use, and the game is over once all lives are lost, though the player has unlimited continues to keep playing.

== Development and release ==
Rayxanber II was developed by Team 50, a group within Data West, which previously worked on the original Rayxanber (1990) for FM Towns. It was designed by Kazuhide Nakamura and produced by Naokazu Akita, with Fumio Minami and Yoshiyuki Washizu acting as co-programmers. Artist Takeharu Igarashi was responsible for the pixel art. The music was scored by Yasuhito Saito, who composed for the original entry and also worked on titles such as Layla and The 4th Unit series. The game was published in Japan by Data West on June 7, 1991 for the PC Engine CD-ROM². After its release, the title was demonstrated at the 1991 Tokyo Toy Show during summer. In a 2020 interview with Japanese gaming website DenFaminicoGamer, a Data West representative commented that there were no current plans for a digital re-release of the Rayxanber series through their official online store, but would consider it if there is demand.

== Reception ==
Reception

Review scores
Publication	Score
Consoles +	66%
Gekkan PC Engine	90/100, 90/100, 85/100, 80/100, 75/100
Joystick	72%
Marukatsu PC Engine	5/10, 6/10, 7/10, 5/10
Player One	94%
Super Gaming	7/10, 7/10, 8/10

Rayxanber II became an "instant success" when it released in Japan according to Electronic Gaming Monthly, but garnered mixed reception from critics, including French publications reviewing it as an import title. In contrast to the critical response, public reception was positive; readers of PC Engine Fan voted to give the title a 22.21 out of 30 score, ranking at the number 155 spot in a poll, indicating a popular following.

Kaneda Kun of Consoles + praised the graphics and audio for taking advantage of the CD-ROM format, as well as the playability and longevity, but noted its difficulty after the third stage despite the unlimited continues feature and panned the game's presentation. Joystick's Jean-Marc Demoly commended the animated visuals, controls and catchy soundtrack but remarked that he did not felt as grabbed by the title compared to Seirei Senshi Spriggan. Reviewing for Player One, Olivier "Iggy" Scamps gave positive remarks to the introduction of various innovations into its gameplay, graphics, smooth scrolling, audio and longevity, regarding it as a fun shoot 'em up but noted its difficulty.

=== Retrospective coverage ===
Retrospective commentaries for Rayxanber II have been equally mixed. Joel Schander of SHMUPS! (a classic network of GameSpy) stated that the title was heavily influenced by R-Type, giving positive remark to the detailed graphics. However, Schander found the music forgettable and also noted its difficult nature, stating " If you can't (or don't want to) memorize a rigid -- and convoluted -- path through each level and follow it every time you play, the game will likely frustrate you to no end by the third or fourth level. If this isn't your thing, avoid the game at all costs." David Borrachero and Antxiko of Spanish magazine RetroManiac regarded both Rayxanber II and Rayxanber III as two of the best games on the PC Engine platform, noting the need of memorizing stage patterns in a similar fashion to R-Type. They also commended both visuals and playability for being "exceptional", as well as the soundtrack for taking advantage of the CD-ROM format. Hardcore Gaming 101's John Sczepaniak found it to be an improvement over its predecessor but concurred with the other reviewers regarding its high difficulty nature, due to lack of balance and "broken" checkpoint system, recommending its follow-up instead.
