= Spriggan Mark 2: Re-Terraform Project =

1992 video game

- Developer: Compile
- Publisher: Naxat Soft
- Producer: Masamitsu Niitani
- Designer: Yuichi Toyama
- Programmer: Yuichi Toyama
- Artists: Hiroki Kodama; Kazuyuki Nakashima
- Writer: Yuichi Toyama
- Composer: Keiji Takeuchi
- Platform: PC Engine Super CD-ROM²
- Release: JP: May 1, 1992
- Genres: Horizontally scrolling shooter Mecha; Military Science Fiction
- Mode: Single-player

Spriggan Mark 2: Re-Terraform Project (Note: Japanese: スプリガンマーク2 リ・テラフォーム・プロジェクト, Hepburn: Supurigan Māku 2: Ri-Terafōmu Purojekuto) is a 1992 horizontally scrolling shooter video game developed by Compile and published in Japan by Naxat Soft for the PC Engine Super CD-ROM². It is a follow-up to Seirei Senshi Spriggan (1991). The game follows lieutenant Greg Erwin piloting the armed Bartholomeu armor and later the Spriggan Mark 2 in a war between two opposing forces to decide the fate of a space colony at Mars. The player must fight against waves of enemies to avoid collision with their projectiles and other obstacles, while intermissions between characters during gameplay advances the storyline.

Spriggan Mark 2 was produced over the course of ten months by Yuichi Toyama, who took upon the role of planner, programmer and scenario writer. The project originally began as a sequel to MUSHA, as Masamitsu Niitani asked the team to make a game featuring Greg Erwin as protagonist, with their goal being an anime-style shooter where characters would speak to the player during gameplay. It garnered generally favorable reception from critics, most of which reviewed it as an import title. The game was re-released for the Wii's Virtual Console and later included as part of the PC Engine Mini console in its western variants, marking its first official appearance in North American and European regions. According to Hiroyuki Maruyama of G.rev, the title was one of the main inspirations for Strania: The Stella Machina (2011). It was followed by Spriggan Powered (1996).

== Gameplay ==
Gameplay screenshot

Spriggan Mark 2: Re-Terraform Project is a futuristic science fiction-themed horizontal-scrolling shoot 'em up game where the player assume the role of Greg Erwin piloting the armed Bartholomeu armor and later the Spriggan Mark 2 in a war between two opposing forces to decide the fate of a space colony at Mars through multiple stages, controlling their ship over a scrolling background until a boss is reached is reached. Gameplay differs from previous Compile shooters, as intermissions between characters plays out during gameplay to advance the storyline.

The elemental orb mechanic from the first entry is replaced with a standard power-up system, where power-ups are dropped by defeated enemies. There are no satellite options to watch the mech's back, but is possible to change its facing direction, allowing the player to deal with threats from behind. At the beginning of the game, the player has access to three weapons with limited ammo, but more weapons become available once the Spriggan Mark 2 mech is obtained. Both the Bartholomeu and Spriggan Mark 2 are equipped with a shield to withstand damage from enemies and solid stage obstacles, which recharges automatically when not taking hits. Once the mech's shield is completely depleted, it will result in a game over.

== Development and release ==
Spriggan Mark 2: Re-Terraform Project was created by Compile, which was primarily known for their vertical shooters. It was produced by Masamitsu Niitani, with Yuichi Toyama taking the role of planner, programmer and scenario writer. Toyama had previously worked as designer and planner for MUSHA and Seirei Senshi Spriggan with Kazuyuki Nakashima, who acted as the game's map and sprite designer. Character designs were handled by Hiroki Kodama, while the music was scored by Keiji Takeuchi. Toyama stated that the project originally started as a sequel to MUSHA, with Niitani asking the staff to make a game featuring Greg Erwin (a pilot who is shot down in the introductory sequence of MUSHA) as the protagonist. Toyama gathered the crew around him and had approximately ten months to ship a finished product, with the team's goal being to make an anime-style shooter where characters would speak to the player during gameplay. Toyama wrote the scenario in between programming, which led him to "crunch time", but the team had time to finish everything. In the middle of development, a staffer commented that the game had no relation with the previous entry, which led to the team tiying Spriggan Mark 2 with both MUSHA and Spriggan via martian imagery. Toyama has since regarded it as one of his favorite titles he developed for consoles. After Spriggan Mark 2, Toyama would join Raizing (now Eighting), a Japanese game developer founded by former Naxat Soft and Compile staff who worked on the Aleste series.

Spriggan Mark 2: Re-Terraform Project was first released for the PC Engine Super CD-ROM² by Naxat Soft in Japan on May 1, 1992. The game was re-released for the Wii's Virtual Console in Japan on January 13, 2009. The title was included in both the Japanese and western variants of the PC Engine Mini console in 2020, marking its first official appearance in North American and European regions.

== Reception ==
Reception

Review scores
Publication	Score
Consoles +	86%
Famitsu	5/10, 7/10, 5/10, 4/10
GameFan	89%, 87%, 77%, 85%
Gekkan PC Engine	75/100, 85/100, 75/100, 85/100, 70/100
Génération 4	89%
Joypad	76%
Joystick	75%
Marukatsu PC Engine	7/10, 7/10, 8/10, 8/10
Player One	84%
Play Time	68%

Spriggan Mark 2: Re-Terraform Project garnered generally favorable reception from critics, most of which reviewed it as an import title during its initial release. Readers of PC Engine Fan voted to give the game a 22.42 out of 30 score, ranking among PC Engine titles at the number 132 spot in a 1993 public poll. Consoles +'s François Hermellin praised the anime-style introduction, sprite animations, CD-quality soundtrack and overall ideas, but noted its change to a horizontal-scrolling shooter when compared to the original Spriggan, expressing that it may be a little too hard and not innovative enough for players. Génération 4 commended the visuals, audio and animations but compared it unfavorably with Syd Mead's Terraforming due to being simple and less action-packed. They also felt it was not addictive as the first entry.

Joystick's Jean-Marc Demoly and Joypad's Jean-François Morisse both compared Spriggan Mark 2 with Side Arms Hyper Dyne and Gate of Thunder, giving positive remarks to the graphics, controls and sound. Player One's Olivier "Iggy" Scamps shared similar thoughts as previous reviewers regarding the game's audiovisual presentation, lending positive ratings to its fun factor and longevity but noted the overall difficulty. German publication Video Games criticized the in-game intermissions, stating that it interrupts gameplay constantly. GameFan's four reviewers disagreed about this aspect of the game's plot, with both Dave Halverson and Brody regarding it as one of the best shooters on the PC Engine Super CD-ROM². In contrast, Play Time found the sequel inferior compared to its predecessor. Hardcore Gaming 101's Kurt Kalata labeled it as an attractive shooter, highlighting the parallax scrolling, background effects and music, but noted that its story will be lost on non-Japanese speakers and opined that "the open levels and huge life meter make the game feel a little unpolished".
