= Spriggan (disambiguation) =

Spriggans are small fairy-like creatures.

Spriggan may also refer to:

- Spriggan (manga), a manga series originally published from 1989 to 1996, adapted into an animated film in 1998 and later into an original net animation in 2022.
- Spriggan Powered, Japan-exclusive video game, third title from the Seirei Senshi Spriggan series.
- Sprigg, a character from Chrono Cross, referred to in the Japanese version as "Spriggan"
- 9M133 Kornet, a Russian anti-tank missile with the NATO codename "Spriggan"
- Emperor Spriggan, AKA Zeref in the manga Fairy Tail
