= Sylphia =

Sylphia may refer to

- Some plants in the Specklinia genus
- Sylphia, a 1993 video game
