= Dimahoo =

2000 video game

- Arcade flyer
- Developer: 8ing/Raizing
- Publisher: Capcom
- Producer: Masato Toyoshima
- Designer: Kenichi Yokoo
- Programmer: Yuichi Toyama
- Composers: Atsuhiro Motoyama; Kenichi Koyano; Manabu Namiki
- Series: Mahō Daisakusen
- Platform: Arcade
- Release: January 21, 2000
- Genre: Bullet hell
- Modes: Single-player, multiplayer
- Arcade system: CP System II

Dimahoo is a medieval-themed manic shooter video game developed by 8ing/Raizing and published by Capcom on the arcade cabinets in 2000. It was released in Japan as Great Mahou Daisakusen (Japanese: グレート魔法大作戦, Hepburn: Gurēto Mahō Daisakusen; "Great Magic War"). It is a sequel to 1993's Sorcer Striker and 1994's Kingdom Grand Prix. The game's soundtrack was published by Suleputer.

== Gameplay ==
Gameplay screenshot

The game is set in a futuristic environment with dragons, little turtles with lasers on their back, and little green goblins with red eyes. The player picks one of four friends to travel with. The two characters fly through the levels in the game and collect items. Each item has a point value and the points are used to fill up a chart at the end. The items include: food, swords, armors, boots, etc. Towards the end of the game, the bosses become incredibly hard. The fast backgrounds create a confusing state of mind for the player.

All of the characters in Dimahoo have a machine gun style shot, their own special bomb attack which ultimately makes them invincible for a second, and an individual personal attack. The personalized charge attack can be used once the magic book icon is collected. This then adds two satellites to the players ship. The satellites are what carry out the charge attack. After holding down the charge button, the charge burst becomes armed and then the character turns from red to blue. If the player releases the button while the character is red, then the attack will be more effective towards blue enemies. Likewise, when the character is blue it will be particularly damaging to the red enemies. When enemies are destroyed by the charge attack, they drop their armor, sword, shield, food, boots, helmets, jewelry or special items. These items each have point values and can be collected for points. The weapons that are fired from the satellites also change from red to blue. When the bullets hit enemies with the same color, it will neutralize them. The player can also collect yellow diamonds in order to fill up the point meter. Once the meter fills up completely, the sound of a chime will go off. A treasure chest with an extra bomb will appear for the player to collect. Once the point meter is filled up, it will reset to zero.

== Reception ==
In Japan, Game Machine listed Dimahoo on their April 1, 2000 issue as being the sixth most popular arcade game at the time.
