= Lords of Thunder =

1993 video game

- North American TurboDuo cover art
- Developer: Red Company (Note: Ported to Sega CD by Hudson Soft and Eleven)
- Publishers: NA: Turbo Technologies; JP: Hudson Soft
- Director: Tomonori Matsunaga
- Producers: Eiji Aoyama; Masaki Kobayashi
- Designer: Kazunori Nakazawa
- Artist: Masamune Shirow
- Composer: Satoshi Miyashita
- Platforms: TurboDuo, Sega CD
- Release: TurboDuo: NA: March 1993; JP: April 23, 1993; Sega CD: NA: March 28, 1995; EU: 1995
- Genre: Scrolling shooter
- Mode: Single-player

Lords of Thunder (released as Winds of Thunder (Note: Winds of Thunder (Japanese: ウィンズ オブ サンダー, Hepburn: Winzu obu Sandā)) in Japan) is a horizontally scrolling shooter developed by Red Company and published in 1993 by Turbo Technologies and Hudson Soft for the TurboDuo. It is the follow-up to Gate of Thunder. The player controls the knight Landis, donning the armor of his ancestor Drak on a confrontation against Zaggart of Garuda Empire, who resurrected the evil god Deoric, and his six dark generals across the land of Mistral.

Lords of Thunder was created by Red Raimon, a group within Red consisting of former Technosoft staff which previously worked on the Thunder Force series, whose members would later form the game development company CAProduction. The soundtrack was composed by Satoshi Miyashita from T's Music, a group of musicians and sound engineers. First released on the TurboDuo, Lords of Thunder was ported to the Sega CD by Hudson Soft and Eleven in 1995, and has since been re-released through the Virtual Console and PlayStation Network download services, in addition to being included on the TurboGrafx-16 Mini console.

Critics praised its stylish and sharp visuals, large and detailed bosses, ability to choose between stages, lack of slowdown and flickering, frantic pacing and hard rock soundtrack, though the gameplay and difficulty were met with mixed response. The Sega CD port saw a mixed reception from reviewers, who said it was inferior to the TurboDuo version due to the washed out colors, audio balancing issues, low difficulty compared to the original version, instances of sprite flickering and lack of fine-tuning. Retrospective commentary have been positive and is considered one of the most important shooting games on the TurboGrafx-16 family of consoles.

== Gameplay ==
TurboDuo screenshot

Lords of Thunder is a fantasy-themed scrolling shoot 'em up game, in which the player controls the knight Landis, donning the armor of his ancestor Drak on a confrontation against Zaggart of Garuda Empire, who resurrected the evil god Deoric, and his six dark generals across the land of Mistral. Prior to starting, a configuration menu can be accessed at the game's title screen, where any of the four available difficulty settings can be selected, and each one arranges both stage hazards and enemy patterns. In addition, a hidden boss rush mode is accessible at the configuration screen via cheat code.

The gameplay structure is different from that of Gate of Thunder; when starting the game, the player can choose any of the first six stages in a manner similar to Thunder Force III, with the last stage being unlocked after all six stages are cleared. Once the stage is selected, the player selects one of four armors (based on the four classical elements) to use, affecting Landis' shots and bombs, as well as the difficulty depending on the selected armor. The player can buy items for Landis before a stage begins with crystal currency at the in-game shop. These items include additional bombs, shields and health-restoring elixirs. The player controls Landis over a constantly scrolling background, populated with an assortment of enemy forces and obstacles. The scenery does not stop moving until a boss is reached, which must be fought in order to clear a stage and proceed into the next one.

Landis is equipped with long-range shots, a powerful sword for close-range attacks, and bombs capable of obliterating enemies and bullets on-screen. When defeated, enemies will occasionally drop collectable items for Landis such as heart icons that restores his health, power crystals that increases his weapon firepower as well as blue and red crystals, which are exchangeable at the shop. Collecting the blue and red crystals are also crucial to reach high-scores. Getting hit by enemy fire or colliding against solid stage obstacles decreases Landis' health and firepower, and the game is over once his health bar is depleted, though the player has the option to select another stage or keep playing using limited continues. More continues can be purchased via the shop.

== Development and release ==
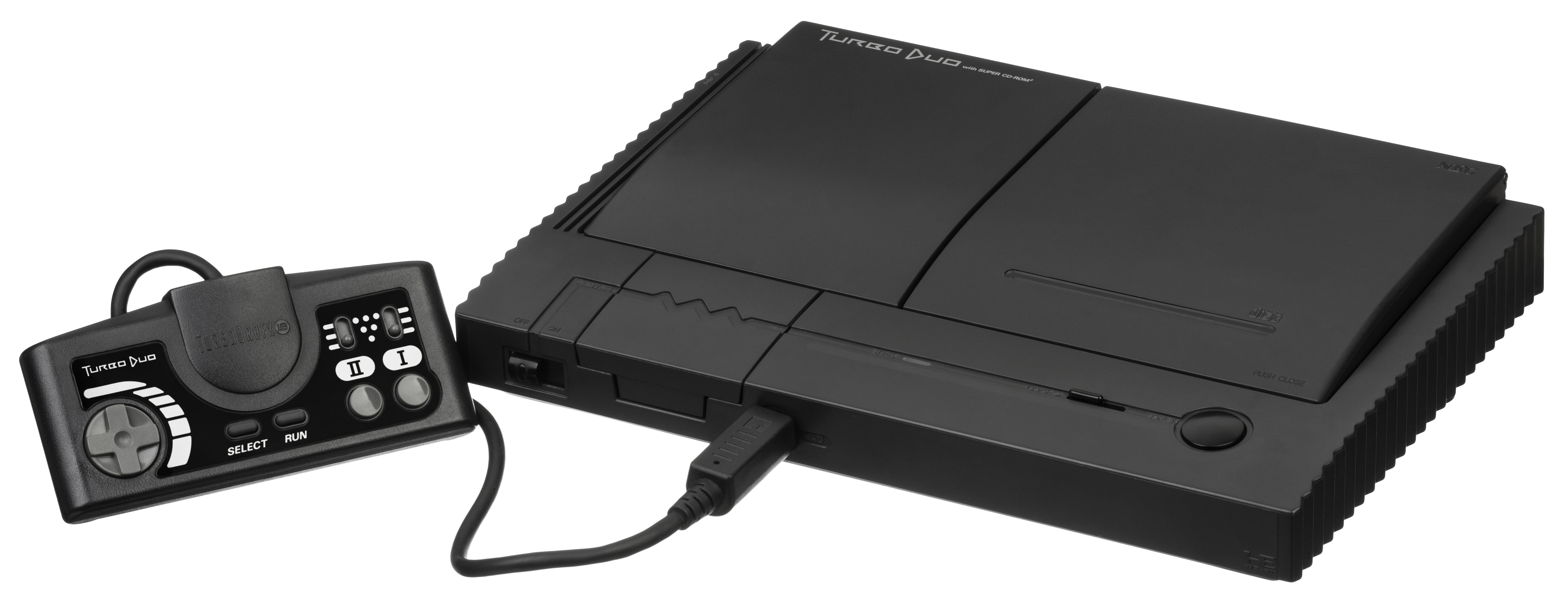
Lords of Thunder for the TurboDuo was created by former Technosoft staff who worked on the Thunder Force series and Gate of Thunder at Red.

Lords of Thunder was developed by Red Raimon (also known as Red Kaminarimon), a group within Red responsible for Gate of Thunder, consisting of former Technosoft staff which previously worked on the Thunder Force series (particularly Thunder Force II and Thunder Force III) but left the company in 1991 and would later form the game development company CAProduction in 1993, with Kazunori Nakazawa serving as planner and character designer. Production was co-led by Hudson Soft members by Eiji Aoyama and Masaki Kobayashi, while Tomonori Matsunaga acted as director. The soundtrack was composed by Satoshi Miyashita (under the alias "Groove King") from T's Music, a group of musicians and sound engineers founded in 1990, which also scored the music for games such as Final Fight CD, Ginga Fukei Densetsu Sapphire, and the Sentimental Graffiti series. Manga artist Masamune Shirow was responsible for the cover art illustration.

Lords of Thunder was first published in North America by Turbo Technologies in March 1993 for the TurboDuo, and later in Japan by Hudson Soft on April 23 for the PC Engine Super CD-ROM² under the title Winds of Thunder. To advertise the game, a promotional recording edited by Tony Hawk limited to 10,000 copies was given away for free via direct order. The title received a Sega CD port developed by Hudson Soft and Eleven, which was first released in North America on March 28, 1995, and in Europe in June of that year. The original TurboDuo version has been re-released several times; it was re-released on the Wii's Virtual Console on February 7, 2008, in Europe, then in North America on February 11, and later in Japan on June 10. It was also re-released for the PlayStation Network as part of the "PC Engine Archives" line in Japan on August 18, 2010. It was re-released through the Wii U's Virtual Console as well in Japan on October 21, 2015, and in North America on November 9, 2017. The game was included in both the Japanese and western variants of the TurboGrafx-16 Mini console in 2020.

== Reception ==
Reviews (TurboDuo)

Review scores
Publication	Score
Consoles +	91%
Computer and Video Games	93/100
Electronic Gaming Monthly	34/40
GameFan	348/400
Joypad	95%
Mega Fun	86%
VideoGames & Computer Entertainment	8/10
Game Zero Magazine	84.5/100
Hippon Super!	8/10
Megablast	88%

Awards
Publication	Award
EGM (1993)	Game of the Month (TurboDuo)
GamePro (1993)	CD Game of the Year (runner-up)

Lords of Thunder garnered acclaim from critics since its release on the TurboDuo. Public reception was also positive: readers of PC Engine Fan voted to give the game a 23.76 out of 30 score, ranking at the number 53 spot in a poll, indicating a large popular following. Electronic Gaming Monthly named it the magazine's "Game of the Month" for March 1993.

Game Zero Magazine's four reviewers highly praised the graphics and metal soundtrack but they felt that gameplay was not as fierce as Gate of Thunder. Likewise, Electronic Gaming Monthly's four reviewers highly commended the stylish and sharp visuals, large bosses and soundtrack, though Martin Alessi in particular felt that the gameplay was not as technical as Gate of Thunder. In a similar manner, GamePro highly acclaimed the graphics, hard rock soundtrack, adjustable difficulty levels, action and controls. VideoGames & Computer Entertainment's Clayton Walnum gave positive remarks to the visuals for showcasing the capabilities of the TurboGrafx, large and detailed bosses, lack of slowdown, frantic pacing and music, stating that "Lords of Thunder is the perfect game for players with fast reflexes and strong controller hands." Consoles Plus' Kaneda Kun and François Hermellin gave positive comments to the anime-style presentation, graphics, sprite animations, sound design, optimal playability and ability to choose between stages on each playthrough. GameFan's four reviewers regarded it as superior to Gate of Thunder and one of the best shooters on the TurboDuo.

Megablast's Richard Löwenstein praised the overall audiovisual presentation, gameplay and controls, stating that Lords of Thunder feels faster and more playable than arcades shooters. Joypad's Jean-François Morisse and Alain Huyghues-Lacour echoed most of the same thoughts as Consoles Plus, commending the game for pushing the capabilities of the PC Engine Super CD-ROM² in terms of visuals and sprites, sound design and controls but they criticized certain aspects such as the easy boss encounters, difficulty and flashing when enemies are hit. Mega Fun's Martin Weidner and Stefan Hellert felt that it surpassed Gate of Thunder, giving positive remarks to the rock-based soundtrack, varied backgrounds across each stage, large bosses, lack of slowdown and flickering. Computer and Video Games's Steve Keen and Paul Anglin stated that its concept was not new and the graphics were very simple but gave positive comments to the addictive gameplay, weapon variety and rock music.

=== Sega CD ===
Reviews (Sega CD)

Review scores
Publication	Score
Electronic Gaming Monthly	6/10
GameFan	252/300
M! Games	82%
Mega Fun	73%
Next Generation	1/5
Superjuegos	86/100
Video Games (DE)	80%
VideoGames	8/10

Lords of Thunder on Sega CD received a mixture of opinions from critics. Electronic Gaming Monthly's four reviewers described it as dramatically inferior to the TurboDuo version, and commented that it had become outdated since the TurboDuo version was released. GameFan's three reviewers stated that the game was still a good shooter on Sega CD but criticized the washed out colors, re-recorded cutscenes and easier difficulty compared to the TurboDuo original. GamePro remarked that though its colors are not as sharp and bright as the TurboDuo version's, the Sega CD version is nonetheless "a fairly close port" and helps fill a niche on a system with very few traditional shooters. Next Generation felt it was similar to Forgotten Worlds and stated that "the game has its moments, but you've seen them, and played them through hundreds of times before as well. Go away!". VideoGames' Geoff Higgins regarded it as a welcomed addition to the Sega CD library but criticized its low difficulty level.

MAN!AC's Martin Gaksch expressed his preference for a Mega-CD conversion of Gate of Thunder. He praised the game for its graphical design, rock music and varied action but criticized its audio balancing issues and low difficulty. Mega Fun' Martin Weidner said that the visuals pale in comparison to the TurboDuo original, criticizing the instances where sprite flickering occurred and lack of fine-tuning. Despite this, Weidner called it a "very good game" due to its level design, power-up system and guitar tracks. Video Games' Wolfgang Schaedle regarded the title's audiovisual presentation as inspiring despite its age, giving positive remarks to the varied stages, enemy patterns and near-lack of slowdown. Superjuegos's Bruno Sol said that stage backgrounds suffered due to the system's inferior 64 color palette and criticized audio balancing issues and low difficulty. Regardless, Sol commended the lack of slowdown and flickering, hard rock soundtrack and playability, stating that "Without being a masterpiece, Lords of Thunder is probably the best shoot 'em up released for the Mega CD console since the consecration of Silpheed, back in the fall of the year 1993."

=== Retrospective coverage ===
Retrospective reviews for Lords of Thunder have been equally positive. AllGame's Shawn Sackenheim highly acclaimed the colorful and varied visuals, hard rock soundtrack, upgradable armor and weapon system as well as its fast pacing. IGN Italia's Andrea Corritore identified the game as one of the most important shooting games on the PC Engine, alongside Gate of Thunder, Ginga Fukei Densetsu Sapphire and Rayxanber III. Reviewing the Virtual Console reissue of the TurboDuo version, Nintendo Life's Damien McFerran deemed it even better than Gate of Thunder. McFerran especially praised the challenging and strategic gameplay and the parallax scrolling. He also added that the soundtrack "is discussed in hushed, almost reverent tones by those that have had the pleasure of experiencing it. It's rip-roaring guitar rock – the kind of music that you might turn your nose up at if you were to hear it on the radio – but in this context, it fits like a chain mail glove".

Eurogamer's Dan Whitehead highlighted its soundtrack, as with Gate of Thunder. IGN's Lucas M. Thomas called it one of the best shooter games on the Virtual Console, stating that it proves to still be just as compelling and energetic "15 years" since its original release. Hardcore Gaming 101's Eric Johnathan Smith opined that the Sega CD's soundtrack felt "less raw" than that of the TurboDuo original. The Japanese book PC Engine Complete Guide 1987-1999 praised the speedy scrolling and expressed surprise about the multiple scrolling backgrounds. They also evaluated the music positively, stating that "the unique atmosphere of high quality metal is attractive".
