= Spriggan Powered =

1996 video game

- Developer: Micronics
- Publisher: Naxat Soft
- Director: Takayuki Yajima
- Designer: Takayuki Yajima
- Programmer: Kazuo Yagi
- Artists: Manabu Sakai; Masataka Uemoto
- Composer: Mutsumi Ishimura
- Platform: Super Famicom
- Release: JP: July 26, 1996
- Genre: Horizontal-scrolling shooter
- Mode: Single-player

Spriggan Powered (Note: Japanese: スプリガン・パワード, Hepburn: Supurigan Pawādo) is a 1996 side-scrolling shoot 'em up video game released by Micronics for the Super Famicom and its Satellaview system. It is the sequel of Spriggan Mark 2: Re-Terraform Project.

== Gameplay ==
Spriggan Powered is a side-scrolling shoot 'em up game.

== Reception ==
Reception

Review score
| Publication | Score |
|---|---|
| Famitsu | 6/10, 6/10, 5/10, 6/10 |

Spriggan Powered was released in Japan on July 26, 1996 for the Super Famicom.

The King of PocketGames, a publication of the popular Chinese Ultra Console Game magazine, praised its graphics. Hardcore Gaming 101 noted its use of computer-rendered sprites, but considered its gameplay average.
