= Yuichi Toyama =

Video game designer

- 外山 雄一
- Born: April 23, 1967 (age 59)
- Other name: "Healthy"
- Occupations: Video game designer, director, producer
- Years active: 1985–present
- Employer(s): Technosoft(1987-1988); Compile(1989-1992); Eighting(1994-2017); Taito(2017-present)

Yuichi Toyama (外山 雄一, Toyama Yuichi) is a Japanese video game designer, director, and producer. He used to work at Technosoft, Compile and Eighting, and is currently working at Taito since 2017. He is also a writer for the Game Culture Preservation Institute(IGCC).

== Early years ==
Toyama started his path in the video game industry after his enjoyment of playing Space Invaders. He had read magazines that featured games like Space Invaders, Star Wars, and Gundam. He always wanted to enjoy those games at home. He originally wanted to either get a Sharp MZ-80 or an NEC PC-8001, but in the end, he started with a Hitachi Basic Master Level 2. After testing the games on it, he had no choice but to do game programming on his own.

== Career ==
=== Technosoft (1987-1989) ===
Toyama started at Technosoft when he was a teenager. He started with being a designer for the game, Feedback, then later a planner and programmer for Herzog

== Works ==
Year	Title	Role(s)	Note(s)	Ref.
1985	Vilzam	Game Designer		
1988	Feedback	Game Designer		
1988	Herzog	Designer		
1989	Blazing Lazers	Special Thanks		
1989	Randar II: Revenge of Death	Thanks		
1990	Ghostbusters	Programmer		
1990	MUSHA	Programmer		
1991	GG Aleste	Special Thanks		
1991	Seirei Senshi Spriggan	Programmer, Thanks		
1992	Spriggan Mark 2: Re-Terraform Project	Scenario		
1993	Sorcer Striker	Programmer		
1994	Kingdom Grand Prix	Game Advisor, Programmer		
1995	Super Bomberman: Panic Bomber W	Production Assistance		
1996	Battle Garegga	Special Thanks		
1997	Sōkyūgurentai	Programmer		
1998	Baroque	Special Thanks		
2000	Dimahoo	Programmer		
2000	Brave Blade	Supervisor		
2001	Kuru Kuru Kururin	Planning Manager		
2001	Tekken Advance	Producer		
2002	The Pinball of the Dead	Director		
2005	Inuyasha: Feudal Combat	Integration Advisor		
2005	Zatch Bell! Mamodo Battles	Supervising Director		
2006	Master of Illusion	Director		
2007	Shijō Saikyō no Deshi Kenichi: Gekitō! Ragnarok Hachikengō	Direction Manager		
2009	Kamen Rider: Dragon Knight	Producer		
2010	Tatsunoko vs. Capcom: Ultimate All-Stars	Product Manager		
2011	Marvel vs. Capcom 3: Fate of Two Worlds	Supervisor		
2011	Ultimate Marvel vs. Capcom 3	Supervisor		
2013	Monster Hunter 3 Ultimate	Supervisor		
2014	Monster Hunter 4 Ultimate	Supervisor		
2018	Ketsui: Kizuna Jigoku Tachi	Special Thanks	M2 ShotTriggers port	
2019	Darius Cozmic Collection	Coordinator		
2019	Sega Genesis Mini	Supervisor	for Darius	
2019	Bubble Bobble 4 Friends	Special Thanks		
2019	ESP. Ra.De. Psy.	Special Thanks		
2020	TurboGrafx-16 Mini	Special Thanks		
2020	Space Invaders Invincible Collection	Director		
2020	Space Invaders Forever	Director		
2020	Aleste Collection	Special Thanks		
2021	Darius Cozmic Revelation	Director		
2021	Senxin Aleste	Advisor		
2023	Ray'z Arcade Chronology	Producer		
