= Chew Man Fu =

1990 video game

- Developer: Now Production
- Publishers: JP: Hudson Soft; NA: NEC
- Designer: Masami Shimotsuma
- Programmer: Atsutane Wakisaka
- Composer: N. Ide
- Platforms: TurboGrafx-16, Mobile phone
- Release: TurboGrafx-16: JP: March 30, 1990; NA: 1990; Mobile phone: NA: 2007
- Genre: Action
- Modes: Single-player, multiplayer

Chew Man Fu (Note: Also known as Be Ball (Japanese: ビーボール, Hepburn: Bī Bōru) in Japan.) is a 1990 action video game developed by Now Production and published in Japan by Hudson Soft and in North America by NEC for the TurboGrafx-16.

Chew Man Fu was created by Now Production, an Osaka-based game development company founded in 1986 by Toshiaki Awamura, who would later work on future projects such as Adventure Island II and Rolling Thunder 3. First released on the TurboGrafx-16, the game has since been ported for mobile phones, with new visuals and level design, and re-released through digital platforms like the Virtual Console and the Japanese cloud gaming service G-cluster, in addition to being included on the PC Engine Mini console.

Chew Man Fu garnered mostly positive reception since its release on the TurboGrafx-16; critics found the game's design to be unusual but straightforward and commended its strong action element, large and detailed character sprites, controls, technical performance and use of passwords to resume progress, but other reviewers felt mixed regarding the overall audiovisual presentation and simple gameplay, while the maze editor was criticized for lacking the ability to save levels. Retrospective commentary has been equally positive. One of the title's main characters appears in Pixel Puzzle Collection (2018) for Android and iOS devices.

== Gameplay ==
Gameplay screenshot

The single-screen levels are inhabited by enemies, who can be killed by the firing of one of the balls. When a ball hits an enemy, it will continue moving in the same direction, intervening walls, and pushing the player backwards slightly. Balls can also be pushed forwards or pulled backwards, including around corners. Once a ball is placed onto its pad, it can be still be moved. Also included is a small bonus Kick-Ball game for two players, which doubles as practice with the control system.

== Development and release ==
Chew Man Fu was developed by Now Production, an Osaka-based game development company founded in 1986 by Toshiaki Awamura, who would later work on future projects such as Adventure Island II and Rolling Thunder 3. The game was co-designed by Masami "Simotuma" Shimotsuma and members under the pseudonym "Yumi" and "Bimbo!". Atsutane "Wakky" Wakisaka served as the game's sole programmer, while N. Ide was responsible for sound.

Chew Man Fu was first published in Japan by Hudson Soft on March 30, 1990, for the PC Engine and later in North America by NEC in 1990 for the TurboGrafx-16. The game was first re-released for the Wii's Virtual Console on February 13, 2007, in Japan, then in North America on February 26 and later in Europe on March 2. The title also received a version for mobile phones in 2007, featuring new visuals as well as reworked level design and controls. It was re-released on June 20, 2013, through the Japanese cloud gaming service G-cluster. In addition, it was re-released through the Wii U's Virtual Console in Japan on July 30, 2014, and later in North America on September 21, 2017. It was included in both the Japanese and western variants of the PC Engine Mini console in 2020.

== Reception ==
Reception

Review scores
Publication	Score
AllGame	3/5
Aktueller Software Markt	10/12
Famitsu	25/40
Génération 4	76%
Joystick	78%
The Games Machine (UK)	71%
Tilt	11/20
Power Play	51%
TurboPlay	7/10

Chew Man Fu on the TurboGrafx-16 received mostly positive reception from critics, most of which reviewed it as an import title. Public reception was also positive; readers of PC Engine Fan voted to give the game a 21.30 out of 30 score, ranking at the number 216 spot in a poll, indicating a popular following. Famitsu's four reviewers found the game to not be as "exhilarating" as Bomberman, but noted that the action element was "quite strong". French magazine Génération 4 commended its use of passwords to resume progress. Joystick's Jean-Marc Demoly gave positive remarks to its visuals for being well-realized, sprite animations, sound and controls. Aktueller Software Markt's Sandra Alter also gave positive commentary to the title in regards to its level editor as well as the graphics, controls, technical performance and play value.

In contrast to other reviewers, Power Play's Martin Gaksch found Chew Man Fu to be too simplistic and felt mixed in regards to its audiovisual presentation. In a similar manner, The Games Machine' Warren Lapworth found the game unusual in terms of design but very simple and straightforward. Lapworth noted that the two-player mode could be fun and commended the character sprites for being large and "excellently" defined, as well as the oriental-style music and sound effects, but criticized its maze editor for lacking the ability to save levels. Tilt's Alain Huyghues-Lacour gave positive remarks to the visuals, animations and sound, but ultimately found the title to be "a little boring in the long run". TurboPlay's Donn Nauert felt mixed about the game's sound but also gave positive remarks to its graphics and playability. AllGame's Shawn Sackenheim found its gameplay to be simple but unique and challenging, and praised the character animations for being "cute and entertaining", as well as the extra game modes and replay value, but criticized both visuals and music for being repetitive.

=== Retrospective coverage ===
Retrospective reviews for Chew Man Fu have been equally positive. Reviewing the Virtual Console re-release, IGN's Lucas M. Thomas compared its gameplay with both Adventures of Lolo and Mole Mania, but remarked that said gameplay could prove simplistic to most players. Nintendo Life concurred with Thomas when reviewing the Virtual Console reissue, stating that the game "won't be everyone's cup of tea" but commended its bright and colorful graphics, as well as the simplistic but challenging and smooth gameplay. When reviewing the Virtual Console relaunch, GameSpot's Frank Provo felt that the title was inspired by both Pengo and Pirate Ship Higemaru. Provo gave positive remarks to the increasingly difficult maze layouts, cartoon-esque sprites, "peppy" music, length, two-player mode and level editor, but he criticized its gameplay for being repetitive and plain presentation. Eurogamer's Dan Whitehead noted it to be simple but addictive and accessible when reviewing the title on the Virtual Console, praising its large sprites and ball physics. Hardcore Gaming 101's Aaron Vark called it "one of the more enjoyable non-shoot-em-up titles for the TurboGrafx-16", citing its styling and gameplay mechanics similar to Pengo.

=== Legacy ===
One of the main characters in Chew Man Fu, Rin Rin, appears in the 2018 game Pixel Puzzle Collection for Android and iOS devices.
