= Gate of Thunder =

1992 video game

- Developer: Red Company
- Publisher: Hudson Soft
- Composer: Nick Wood (Sound Design)
- Platform: TurboGrafx-CD
- Release: JP: February 21, 1992; NA: October 10, 1992
- Genre: Scrolling shooter
- Mode: Single-player

Gate of Thunder (Note: Japanese: ゲート オブ サンダー, Hepburn: Gēto obu Sandā) is a 1992 scrolling shooter video game developed by Red Company and published by Hudson Soft for the TurboGrafx-CD. It was the first game released in North America to support the Super CD-ROM² format and served as one of the pack-in games for the TurboDuo, a two-in-one system which runs both TurboGrafx-CD and TurboGrafx-16 titles, where it was bundled with Bonk's Adventure, Bonk's Revenge and Bomberman on the same disc. In the game, the player controls the Hunting Dog space fighter craft, piloted by space cop Hawk. Alongside his ally Esty, piloting the Wild Cat support ship, Hawk must stop General Don Jingi and his Obellon armada from obtaining the powerful "Starlight" energy source from planet Aries.

Gate of Thunder was created by Red Raimon, a group within Red consisting of former Technosoft staff which previously worked on the Thunder Force series, whose members would later form the game development company CAProduction. It was the first shoot 'em up game programmed for the Super CD-ROM² format, which allowed features such as more detailed visuals due to its increased memory size. The soundtrack was composed by Nick Wood, a co-founding member of the Syn Sound Design music production studio. First released on the TurboGrafx-CD, the title has since been re-released through the Virtual Console and PlayStation Network download services.

Gate of Thunder garnered acclaim since its release on the TurboGrafx-CD; critics praised the presentation for its detailed and colorful graphics, well-animated sprites, use of parallax scrolling, large bosses, lack of slowdown, CD-quality heavy metal soundtrack, fast gameplay and intense action. Retrospective commentary have been equally positive, being considered one of the best video games of all time and one of the most important shooting titles on the platform. A follow-up, titled Lords of Thunder, was released for the TurboDuo in 1993.

== Gameplay ==
Gameplay screenshot

Gate of Thunder is a science fiction-themed scrolling shoot 'em up game, in which the player takes control of the Hunting Dog space fighter craft piloted by the space cop Hawk who, alongside his ally Esty piloting the Wild Cat support ship, must stop General Don Jingi and his Obellon armada from obtaining a powerful energy source known as "Starlight" from planet Aries. Prior to starting, a configuration menu can be accessed at the game's title screen, where any of the four available difficulty settings can be selected. The player controls Hunting Dog through seven increasingly difficult stages over a constantly scrolling background, populated with an assortment of military enemy forces and obstacles, and the scenery never stops moving until a boss is reached, which must be fought in order to progress further.

The weapon system is reminiscent of Thunder Force III; There are three types of weapon units in the game Hunting Dog can acquire by collecting their respective colors when the Wild Cat deploys them and alternate between each one at any given time during gameplay, ranging from laser (blue), waves (green) and earthquake (red). Collecting any weapon unit also equips Hunting Dog with a set of two satellite-like options that blocks incoming enemy shots, as well as firing forward or backward by double tapping the fire button. Each weapon can be powered-up once and when all weapons are maxed out, collecting an additional weapon unit unleashes a firewall capable of obliterating enemies and bullets caught within its range. Wild Cat will also deploy supplementary units such as homing missiles and a three-hit force shield.

Hunting Dog is also equipped with a speed setting, which can be increased or decreased across three levels by pressing the select button. Firing on determined locations of a stage will reveal a secret item within its scenery. The title employs a respawn system where their ship immediately starts at the location they died at. Getting hit by enemy fire or colliding against solid stage obstacles will result in losing a life, as well as the weapon that was currently in use by Hunting Dog, and the game is over once all lives are lost, though the player has limited continues to keep playing.

== Development and release ==
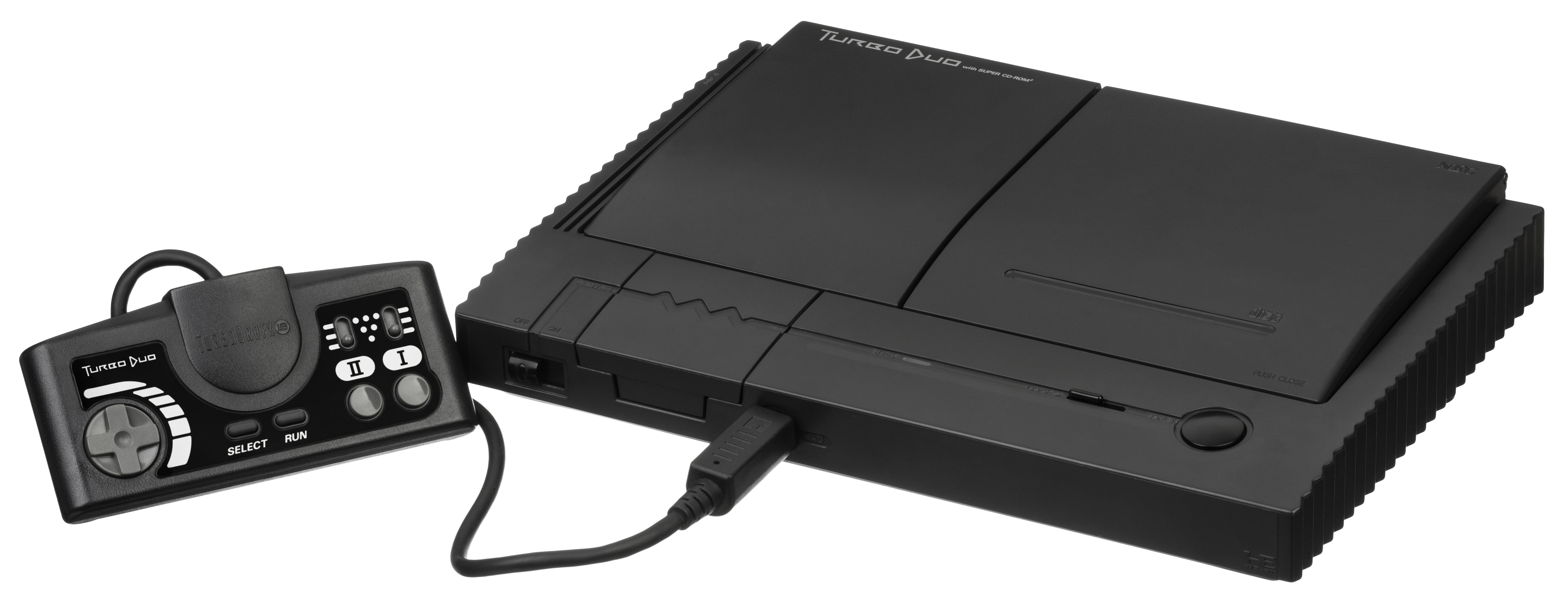
Gate of Thunder was created by former Technosoft staff who worked on the Thunder Force series at Red. It was one of the pack-in games for the TurboDuo.

Gate of Thunder was developed by Red Raimon (also known as Red Kaminarimon), a group within Red consisting of former Technosoft staff which previously worked on the Thunder Force series (particularly Thunder Force II and III) but left the company in 1991, whose members would later form the game development company CAProduction in 1993. It was the first shoot 'em up game programmed for the Super CD-ROM² format, which allowed features such as more detailed visuals due to its increased memory size. The soundtrack was composed by Nick Wood, a co-founding member of the Syn Sound Design music production studio, though he is listed as sound designer in the game's staff roll.

Gate of Thunder was first published in Japan by Hudson Soft on February 21, 1992 for the PC Engine Super CD-ROM². Prior to launch, its plot was adapted into a manga featuring several Hudson Soft characters titled Hudson Makyou: Genjin Bakuhatsu Densetsu, which was published by Minori Shobo on January 6. The game was later released in North America on October 10, 1992, being the first title in the region to support the Super CD-ROM² format and served as one of the pack-in games for the TurboDuo, a two-in-one system which runs both TurboGrafx-CD and TurboGrafx-16 titles, where it was bundled as a "three-in-one" package with Bonk's Adventure, Bonk's Revenge and Bomberman on the same disc.

After its release, it was showcased to attendees at the 1992 COMDEX show. On May 21, 1993, an album containing selected music tracks from the game was published exclusively in Japan by Hudson Soft. Gate of Thunder was re-released for the Wii's Virtual Console on October 15, 2007 in North America, being the first CD-based game on the Virtual Console, then in Europe on October 19 and later in Japan on December 4. The game was also re-released for the PlayStation Network as part of the "PC Engine Archives" line in Japan on March 17, 2010.

== Reception ==
Reception

Review scores
Publication	Score
Consoles +	95%
Electronic Gaming Monthly	34/40
Famitsu	27/40
GameFan	89%, 95%
Joypad	96%
Joystick	97%

Award
Publication	Award
Electronic Gaming Monthly (1997)	#53 Top 100 Best Console Video Games of All Time

Gate of Thunder garnered acclaim from critics since its release on the TurboGrafx-CD, most of which reviewed it as an import title. Public reception was also positive; readers of PC Engine Fan voted to give the game a 24.38 out of 30 score, ranking at the number 31 spot in a poll, indicating a large popular following. Famitsu's four reviewers noted that a lot of effort went into the game's visuals and difficulty level. Video Games' Julian Eggebrecht drew comparison with Thunder Force III due to its weapon system but regarded it as an outstanding title for the PC Engine Super CD-ROM², commending the well-animated sprites and graphics. Consoles Plus' Fred and Marc Menier gave positive remarks to the overall graphical presentation, sprite animations, use of parallax scrolling, lack of slowdown, sound design, frenetic action and excellent gameplay.

Joypad's Jean-François Morisse and Joystick's Jean-Marc Demoly gave very positive commentary in regards to the animated visuals and sprites, controls and sound, with Demoly stating that it was the best shooter on the PC Engine CD-ROM. GameFan's Dave Halverson and Brody commended the game for its music and fast gameplay but Halverson criticized the lack of unique environments. Electronic Gaming Monthly's four reviewers also praised the title for its intense action, highly detailed and colorful graphics, large bosses and music.

=== Retrospective coverage ===
Retrospective reviews for Gate of Thunder have been equally positive. AllGame's Shawn Sackenheim regarded it as one of the best shooters developed on the TurboGrafx-CD despite its simple nature, highly praising its hard rock soundtrack, detailed graphics, diverse backgrounds, lack of slowdown and flickering, and frenetic action but noted that the gameplay lacked innovation. IGN Italia's Andrea Corritore identified the game as one of the most important shooting games on the PC Engine, alongside Ginga Fukei Densetsu Sapphire, Lords of Thunder and Rayxanber III. Reviewing the Virtual Console reissue, Nintendo Life's Damien McFerran felt that the visuals surpassed those of Thunder Force IV and the best SNES offerings. Ferran highly commended the rock soundtrack, boss designs and cutscenes but he concurred with Sackenheim in regards to the gameplay, stating that "there's nothing here that will shock or surprise veterans of the genre".

In 1997, EGM editors listed it as number 53 on their 100 best console video games of all time, explaining that it stood apart from other shooters due to its CD-quality heavy metal soundtrack and animated backgrounds, which "are as much an enemy in this game as the swarms of enemy bogies or the dozens of bosses and minibosses". They added that they chose Gate of Thunder over its sequel, Lords of Thunder, because it is lengthier.

Reviewing the Virtual Console re-release, GameSpot's Frank Provo said that the game is overly short and lacking in innovation, particularly noting the lack of any way of dealing with enemies other than shooting them but the memorable level and boss designs, well-conceived weapons system and consistently outstanding soundtrack make it a worthwhile purchase. Eurogamer's Dan Whitehead called it a cult title when reviewing the Virtual Console relaunch, praising the catchy melodic rock music and rewarding level design. He said it was not the most innovative shooter in terms of overall gameplay, but he felt it was still one of the best. Reviewing the Virtual Console release, IGN's Lucas M. Thomas concurred with Provo on most points but argued that Gate of Thunder makes a number of innovations to the shooter genre.
