= Ginga Fukei Densetsu Sapphire =

1995 video game

- Developer: CAProduction
- Publisher: Hudson Soft
- Director: Osamu Tsujikawa
- Artist: Mika Akitaka
- Composer: T's Music
- Platform: PC Engine
- Release: JP: 24 November 1995
- Genre: Shoot 'em up
- Modes: Single-player, multiplayer

Ginga Fukei Densetsu Sapphire (Japanese: 銀河婦警伝説サファイア), (Note: lit. "Galaxy Policewoman Legend Sapphire") commonly abbreviated to Sapphire in English, is a shoot 'em up developed by CAProduction for the PC Engine CD-ROM² System. It was published in 1995 by Hudson Soft exclusively in Japan. The story follows an all-women police force in 2092 traveling through time to intercept terrorists committing crimes across the past and future. The player takes on the role of a police officer and controls their spaceship through waves of enemies and powerful bosses.

Hudson forged a collaboration between CAProduction and Mika Akitaka to develop Sapphire. Akitaka was known for his artistic work in the Galaxy Fräulein Yuna adventure game series and Gundam media franchise. Hudson saw potential in combining Akitaka's art style with a new shoot 'em up CAProduction was developing and cultivated a partnership. Sapphire was released on the Arcade CD-ROM² format due its enhanced graphical effects, and requires the Arcade Card RAM expansion developed by NEC to run.

In retrospective coverage, Sapphire is considered one of the best PC Engine shoot 'em ups. Although the gameplay was found to be average, critics concluded that the graphics and sound were of such incredible quality that they made up for any shortcomings in the game mechanics. Sapphire was produced in low numbers at the end of the PC Engine's lifespan and subsequently became a rare collector's item. The game's value soared to hundreds of dollars and lead to counterfeiting in the mid-2000s. In 2008, the game was re-released on a compilation for the PlayStation Portable released exclusively in Japan.

== Gameplay ==
Gameplay in stage one

Sapphire is a 2D vertically scrolling shoot 'em up. The story takes place in 2092, when time travel is common across society. Terrorists have taken to stashing weapons and other contraband in the past, which leads to the formation of a police force (composed only of women) to counter the threat. The story follows the force in their efforts to chase one particularly elusive enemy through time. The game is split across five levels, each taking place in a different times and locations: A futuristic city, the Middle Ages, ancient Egypt and Japan, and finally outer space. The levels are remarkably short compared to the longer boss battles.

The player can pick to play as one of four women. Each has their own ship with a unique movement speed and three unique weapons. Weapons include a straight shot, wide angle shot, and a rear-facing shot, which can be powered-up by colored gems the player can pick up. When powered up, two pods fly next to the ship which can absorb enemy fire and unleash powerful shots. A limited supply of bombs are also available that deal high damage. The difficulty in Sapphire is adjustable. In addition, players can give themselves up to nine credits in the game options, and may also be granted extra lives and continues if they obtain a high score. The game supports two-player cooperative play.

== Development ==
The PC Engine video game console, co-developed by NEC and Hudson Soft, was known for its quality graphical adventures and shoot 'em ups. The game was printed using the Arcade CD-ROM² format which requires the Arcade Card RAM expansion for enhanced graphics. Although shoot 'em ups were prominent in the late 1980s, popular interest shifted to fighting games in the wake of Street Fighter II's release in the early 1990s. In order to compete with the Super NES and Mega Drive, NEC developed a RAM expansion for the PC Engine called the "Arcade Card". The extra 2.25 MB of memory was large and allowed for higher quality ports of fighting games. Despite the waning popularity of shoot 'em ups, Hudson commissioned CAProduction to develop one as what would become the final Arcade Card game.

CAProduction were working on a third entry in the "Thunder" trilogy following Gate of Thunder (1992) and Lords of Thunder (1993) when they were approached by Hudson. Concurrently, Hudson saw the popularity of the bishōjo adventure game series Galaxy Fräulein Yuna and saw potential at combining the two. The Galaxy Fräulein Yuna series was written and designed by Mika Akitaka, an artist known for his mecha girl designs in the Gundam media franchise. The first Galaxy Fräulein Yuna game was a pure visual novel, and while the second game added action elements like dungeon crawling and turn-based card battles, Akitaka had always wanted to develop a shoot 'em up. Hudson brought Akitaka on board to work with CAProduction to develop Sapphire as an original; it was unrelated to the story in his Galaxy Fräulein Yuna games. Hudson also sourced the studio J.C.Staff for animation work.

The music in the game was composed and performed by the company T's Music who are a group of musicians and sound engineers. The company was founded in 1990, and they also composed the music to the games Lords of Thunder, Final Fight CD, and the Sentimental Graffiti series. The rights to the music used in the game is the property of Hudson Soft.

== Release ==
Sapphire was published by Hudson and released on 24 November 1995 in Japan for the PC Engine. When it was released 32 bit consoles like the Sega Saturn and Sony PlayStation had already been released, and the day of release was also the day when Famicom Space World '95 conference opened, where Nintendo would show off their Nintendo 64 console.

The release came late in the PC Engine's lifespan and subsequently was printed in low numbers. As a result, Sapphire became a rare collector's item, selling for high prices in the video game collecting market. E. Kozo of Hardcore Gamer said used copies were obtainable for about US$300 in 2008, not including the "hundreds of dollars worth of 20-year-old hardware from Japan" needed to play it. A prospective player needs a Japanese region PC Engine with a CD-ROM drive and an Arcade Card to play. In 2015, Eurogamer noted that copies were selling for around £300. The game's notorious rarity also made it a popular target for counterfeiting around 2005. Eurogamer said that the counterfeits were impressive and only identifiable under incredible scrutiny. They were convincing enough to become valued at over £100 and influenced prices of original Sapphire copies. Due to its rarity and specific hardware requirements, few gamers have played Sapphire. Kurt Kalata of Hardcore Gaming 101 called it one of the "holy grails" of PC Engine collecting.

On 31 July 2008, Hudson Soft released a compilation of the first two Galaxy Fräulein Yuna games and Sapphire on the PlayStation Portable in Japan. The compilation is titled Ginga Ojousama Densetsu Collection (Note: Japanese: 銀河お嬢様伝説コレクション; lit. "Galaxy Lady Legend Collection") and was released as part of the PC Engine Best Collection series. This release adds in options to change the aspect ratios for all three games. This includes the original aspect ratio which fills half the screen, a slightly vertically stretched ratio which covers most of the screen, and a full screen mode. The collection also features an art gallery with Akitaka's concept art for the games and some original artwork.

== Reception and legacy ==
Reception

Review score
Publication	Score
Famitsu	4/10, 4/10, 6/10, 5/10

Upon release, Ginga Fukei Densetsu Sapphire was reviewed by four critics in from Famicom Tsūshin. One reviewer said the flashy appearance of the game recalled earlier titles Truxton and Aleste, while a second reviewer said that the graphics were beautiful for being on an 8-bit machine. Two reviewers said the game was too difficult while one disagreed. One said the game was not very exhilarating as it lacked a sense of speed. One reviewer was shocked by the genre, expecting a raising sim based on the title.

In retrospective coverage, both Kurt Kalata of Hardcore Gaming 101 and E. Kozo of Hardcore Gamer lauded Sapphire as one of the greatest PC Engine shoot 'em ups. Kalata described it as "the ultimate PC Engine shooter...a showpiece for what the system could do" while Kozo called it "one of the best shooters ever made". In his review, Kalata found the gameplay mediocre and non-innovative but said the strengths lied in the game's graphics and sounds. He goes on to explain that some of Sapphire's 2D sprites were pre-rendered at a high quality and animated so well that they seemed like 3D polygons. Kalata also praised the other graphical effects such as digitized holograms, morphing effects, and scaling effects. In the same vein, Kozo commended the game's parallax scrolling and lighting effects. He concluded that "Sapphire's style and action make up for any of its shortcomings".

Both Kalata and Kozo praised the PlayStation Portable compilation Ginga Ojousama Densetsu Collection for giving gamers a more accessible way to play the game. Reviewing the re-release, Kozo thought the compilation had a great value since original Sapphire copies were worth ten times its price. He also praised the bonus art content but criticized the poorly implemented aspect ratio options. He felt the original aspect ratio was too small, the full screen ratio was too stretched, and felt the game was lacking a proper vertical display option. He concluded that the re-release of Sapphire was a "top notch example of a quality game withstanding the test of time".

IGN identified the game as one of the most important shooting games on the PC Engine, alongside Gate of Thunder, Lords of Thunder and Rayxanber III.
