= Kingdom Grand Prix =

1994 video game

- Developer: Raizing
- Publisher: Eighting
- Programmers: Yasunari Watanabe; Yuichi Toyama
- Artists: Akihiro Yamada; Kazuyuki Nakashima; Kenichi Yokoo
- Composers: Hitoshi Sakimoto; Masaharu Iwata
- Series: Mahō Daisakusen
- Platforms: Arcade, Saturn
- Release: JP: September 1994; EU: 1994
- Genres: Racing, scrolling shooter
- Modes: Single-player, multiplayer

Kingdom Grand Prix (Note: Also known as Shippuu Mahou Daisakusen Kingdom-Grandprix (Japanese: 疾風魔法大作戦(しっふうまほうだいさくせん)キングダム-グランドプリ, Hepburn: Shippū Mahō Daisakusen Kingudamu-Gurandopri; lit. "Hurricane Magic Armageddon - Kingdom-Grandprix") in Japan.) is a scrolling shooter/racing hybrid arcade game developed by Raizing and published by Eighting. It was later ported to the Sega Saturn. It is the second entry in the Mahou Daisakusen series, but the first to be a shooter/racing hybrid.

== Gameplay ==
Arcade version screenshot

The game consists of a vertically scrolling field where the player races against seven contestants while shooting enemies and avoiding enemy bullets. Tapping the fire button fires the player's weapons; holding it down gives the player a speed boost. In addition to these speed boosts, overall speed will increase or decrease depending on screen position (the higher up the player craft is onscreen, the faster it travels). Overall speed decreases every time a life is lost or the next stage is reached.

The player is also given a limited amount of bombs which destroy most on-screen enemies and slow down the opponent racers. There are four power-ups in Kingdom Grandprix. All have a cumulative effect on overall power except the bomb which simply increases the number of times it can be used.

The game has a total of twelve stages in a branching path configuration. In most cases, there is a choice of two stages for each level. There is only one choice for the first level, and there are three choices for the sixth level. Beating the first loop of the game in one credit and finishing first overall unlocks the second loop, where all the stages not selected in the first loop are played.

== Synopsis ==
=== Plot ===
For decades the kingdom has been ravaged by war. Too many innocents have suffered and legions of good men have lost their lives in battle. The king had an idea to stop the war; he would hold a big race that would encompass every part of the kingdom. Everyone from each part of the kingdom was invited to participate. The wars ceased and the people began looking forward to this competition every year.

== Development and release ==
Kingdom Grand Prix was developed by Raizing.

Kingdom Grand Prix was first released in arcades by Eighting across Japan and Europe in September 1994. During its initial launch, the game did not receive a CD music album release until April 24, 2013, which was published by Wave Master. The game was later released for the Sega Saturn by GAGA Communications on June 14, 1996. The Saturn version includes a shooting-only mode, where the racing aspect is removed and the player is left to play the game at their own pace. In 2022, the original arcade version was included as part of the Sega Astro City Mini V, a vertically-oriented variant of the Sega Astro City mini console.

== Reception ==
Reception

Review scores
Publication	Score
Famitsu	(SS) 60/100
Consoles +	(SS) 90%
Joypad	(SS) 3/5
MAN!AC	(SS) 51%
Sega Saturn Magazine (JP)	(SS) 5.33/10

Kingdom Grand Prix was well received. Three reviewers from the Japanese Sega Saturn Magazine rated it a 5.33 out of 10. According to Famitsu, the Saturn version sold over 7,441 copies in its first week on the market. Four reviewers of Famitsu gave the Saturn version a score of 60 out of 100. François Garnier French magazine Consoles + gave it a review score of ninety percent. Olivier Prézeau of French magazine Joypad gave it a three out of five score. GameSetWatch's Todd Ciolek gave the game an overall mixed outlook, stating that "it's a true curiosity, even if its one unique idea doesn't quite work. And it's still one to try, as both a solid twitch-game and a glimpse of one shooter developer's attempt at something different, if not necessarily better". Hardcore Gaming 101's Kurt Kalata gave it a mostly positive retrospective outlook.
