= Rayxanber =

1990 video game

- Developer: Data West
- Publisher: Data West
- Director: Kazuhide Nakamura
- Producer: Naokazu Akita
- Programmer: Takayasu Sato
- Artists: Takeharu Igarashi; Yoshiko Miyamoto
- Composer: Yasuhito Saito
- Series: Rayxanber
- Platform: FM Towns
- Release: JP: April 13, 1990
- Genre: Scrolling shooter
- Mode: Single-player

Rayxanber (Note: Japanese: ライザンバー, Hepburn: Raizanbā) is a 1990 scrolling shooter video game developed and published by Data West for the FM Towns. It is the first entry in the Rayxanber series, followed by Rayxanber II (1991) and Rayxanber III (1992) for the PC Engine platform. In the game, the player assumes the role of a fighter pilot from Earth controlling the RT-X-32 space craft to fight against the biomechanical Zoul Empire. The title was created by Team 50, a group within Data West. The soundtrack was scored by Yasuhito Saito, who composed for other titles such as Layla and The 4th Unit series. It garnered mixed reception from critics.

== Gameplay ==
Screenshot of the game's second stage.

Rayxanber is a science fiction-themed scrolling shooter game reminiscent of R-Type, in which the player takes control of a fighter pilot from Earth controlling the RT-X-32 space craft to fight against the biomechanical Zoul Empire. The player controls the ship through eight increasingly difficult stages over a constantly scrolling background, populated with an assortment of bioships, organic fortresses and obstacles. The scenery never stops moving until a boss is reached, which must be fought in order to progress further.

There are three types of weapon units in the game the player can acquire by collecting their respective colors when dropped by carriers when shot down and alternate between each one by obtaining another weapon during gameplay, ranging from fire (red), barriers (green), and multi-directional laser (blue). Each weapon can be powered-up and collecting any weapon unit equips the ship with a set of two satellite-like options that fire based on the direction the unit was rotating towards before being obtained. By holding down the attack button, the player can charge the ship's cannon to unleash a more powerful blast against enemies. The ship is also capable of performing a dash maneuver to evade incoming enemy fire or obstacles.

The title employs a checkpoint system in which a downed player will start off at the beginning of the checkpoint they managed to reach before dying. Getting hit by enemy fire or colliding against solid stage obstacles will result in losing a life, as well as a penalty of decreasing the ship's firepower and loss of the weapon that was currently in use, and the game is over once all lives are lost, though the player has unlimited continues to keep playing.

== Development and release ==
Rayxanber was developed by Team 50, a group within Data West composed of director Kazuhide Nakamura, programmer Takayasu Sato, artists Takeharu Igarashi and Yoshiko Miyamoto, producer Naokazu Akita and two playtesters. The soundtrack was scored by Yasuhito Saito, who composed for other titles such as Layla and The 4th Unit series. The game was published in Japan by Data West on April 13, 1990, for the FM Towns, although it was originally scheduled for a March release. In a 2020 interview with Japanese gaming website DenFaminicoGamer, a Data West representative commented that there were no current plans for a digital re-release of the Rayxanber series through their official online store, but would consider it if there is demand.

== Reception ==
Reception

Review score
Publication	Score
Technopolis	5/7

Rayxanber received mixed reception from critics. The Japanese publication Micom BASIC Magazine ranked the game at the number thirty-one spot in popularity on their July 1990 issue. A writer for Japanese gaming magazine Technopolis commended the audiovisual presentation but noted its difficulty. David Borrachero of Spanish gaming magazine RetroManiac regarded it as a curiosity and stated that the visuals were inspired by R-Type and Gradius. Borrachero also found its playability fair but claimed that "it offers almost nothing that we have not already seen." Hardcore Gaming 101's John Sczepaniak wrote that "There is little redeemable about the original Rayxanber apart from the fact that if your only gaming system in 1990 was an FM Towns computer, there were only a couple of other shooters available to you. Otherwise it's a fairly unremarkable game."

== Legacy ==
Rayxanber spawned two sequels on the PC Engine. In 1991, Rayxanber II was released for the PC Engine CD-ROM², becoming a success when it released in Japan but garnered mixed reception from critics reviewing it as an import title and retrospective commentaries, most of which noted its high difficulty nature. In 1992, Rayxanber III was released for the PC Engine Super CD-ROM², serving as the last entry in the trilogy. It was anticipated by Japanese players, but garnered mixed reception from reviewers. However, it has been retroactively considered one of the best games for the PC Engine and one of the most important shooting titles on the platform.
