= TurboDuo =

Fourth-generation video game console

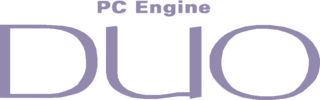

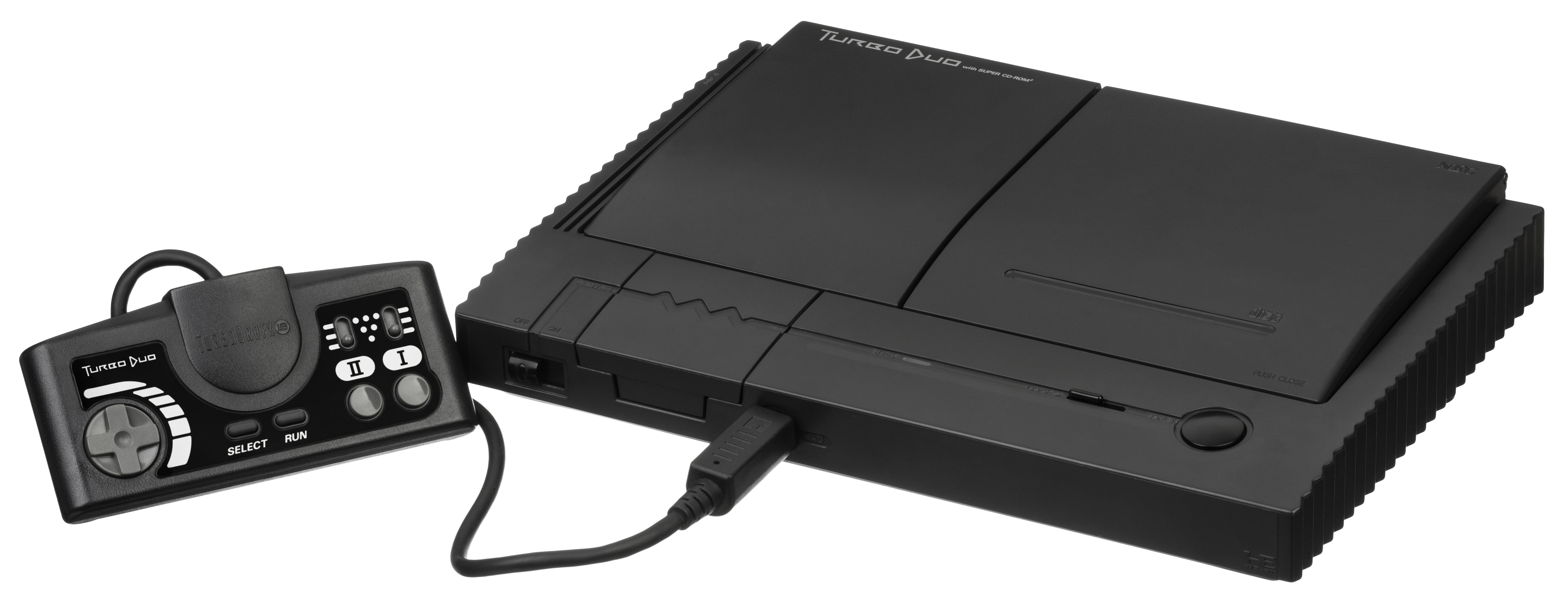
- TurboDuo with gamepad
- Manufacturer: NEC Home Electronics, Hudson Soft
- Type: Home video game console
- Generation: Fourth generation era
- Released: JP: September 21, 1991; NA: October 10, 1992
- Lifespan: 1991–1995
- Introductory price: US$299.99 (equivalent to $710 in 2025)
- Discontinued: WW: December 25, 1995
- Media: TurboChip, CD-ROM
- CPU: HuC6280 @ 1.79 MHz or 7.16 MHz
- Memory: 8KB work RAM, 64KB video RAM, 192KB additional memory (System 3.0)
- Display: 256 × 224, 512 × 224, 512 × 240 screen resolutions. 512 available colors, 481 on-screen colors
- Graphics: HuC6270 VDC, HuC6260 VCE
- Sound: HuC62806, PSG audio channels
- Input: Gamepad
- Predecessor: TurboGrafx-16 (PC Engine); TurboGrafx-CD (CD-ROM² System)
- Successor: PC-FX

The TurboDuo (later rebranded as simply the Duo) is a fourth-generation video game console developed by NEC Home Electronics and Hudson Soft for the North American market. It combines the capabilities of the TurboGrafx-16 and its CD-ROM drive add-on, the TurboGrafx-CD, into a single, redesigned unit. Initially test-marketed in Los Angeles in October 1992 before a nationwide rollout in May 1993, TurboDuo is the localized version of the Japanese PC Engine Duo, which was released in September 1991.

Compared to TurboGrafx-16 and the TurboGrafx-CD, TurboDuo has an updated BIOS and 192 KB of additional RAM. The RAM increase and BIOS update afford the TurboDuo and PC Engine Duo compatibility with all CD-ROM² and Super CD-ROM² based software (Japanese and North American). Like the TurboGrafx-CD, the TurboDuo can read Audio CDs and CD+G discs. TurboDuo, however, cannot read PC Engine HuCards without modification or an adapter. With a HuCard adapter and an Arcade Card Duo, the TurboDuo can also read Arcade CD-ROM² games (which were sold only in Japan).

== Marketing ==
=== Japan ===
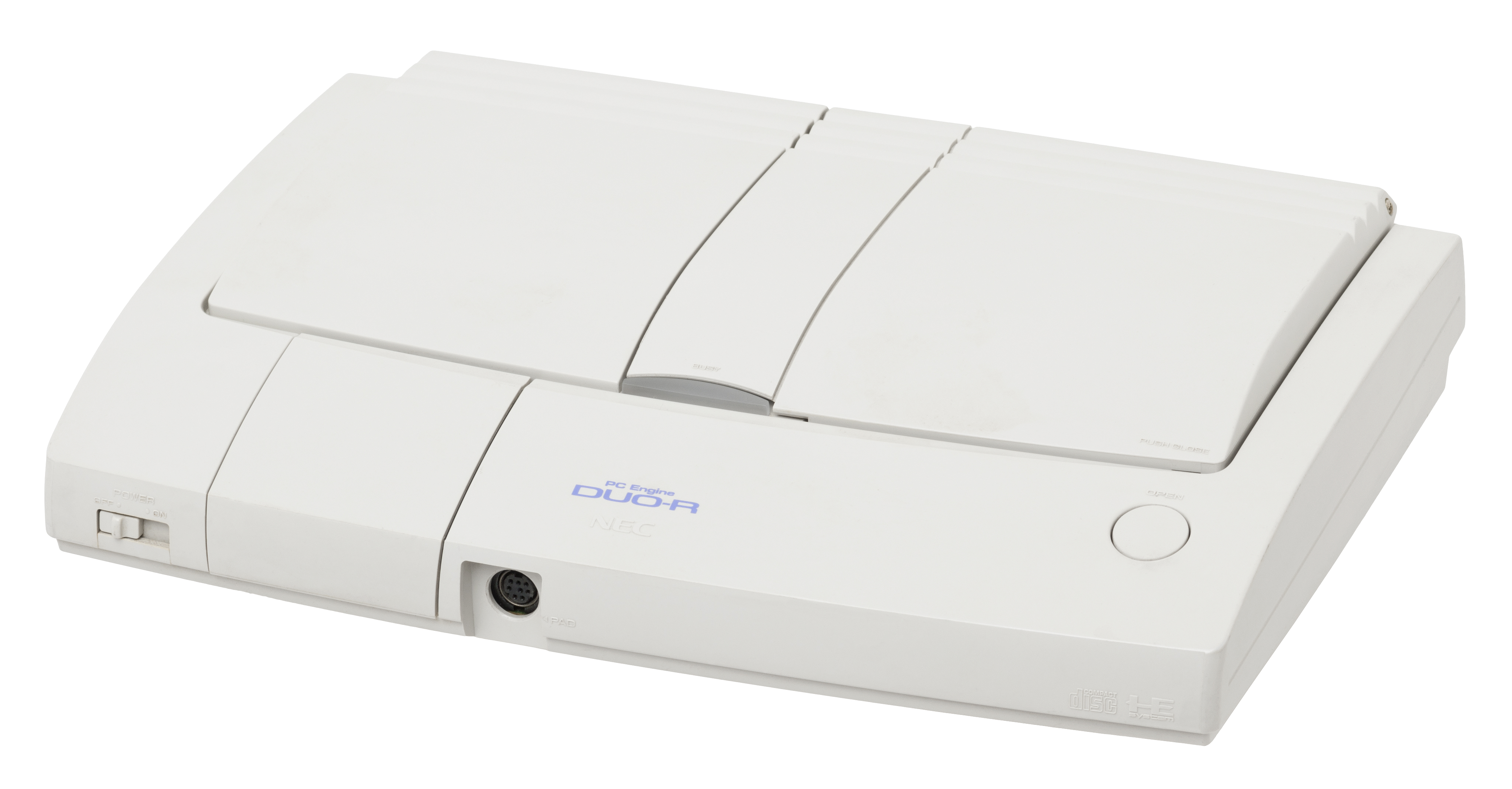
The Japanese PC Engine Duo R

When the PC Engine Duo launched in Japan on September 21, 1991, it retailed for ¥59,800. The product garnered a Good Design Award.

NEC later revised the design of the console to reduce both manufacturing costs and the sale price. This new version, the PC Engine Duo R (PCエンジンDuo-R, Pī Shī Enjin Duo Āru), went to market on March 25, 1993 with a retail price of ¥39,800. The Duo R omits the 3.5 mm phone connector for headphones, and the locking switch for the lid of the Duo's top-loading CD-ROM drive. The Duo R has a differently shaped, off-white casing.

NEC released its final variation of the PC Engine Duo on June 25, 1994. The PC Engine Duo RX (PCエンジンDuo-RX, Pī Shī Enjin Duo Āru Ekkusu) has a bluer case, and was bundled with the Arcade Pad 6, a six-button controller, instead of the standard Turbo Pad controller.

=== North America ===
TTI released the TurboDuo to consumers in North America to a limited test market on October 10, 1992 at a retail price of US$299.99, it released nationwide in early 1993. The price was, in part, a consequence of the relatively high cost of CD-ROM drive manufacturing. In the United States, the TurboDuo was marketed by Turbo Technologies, Inc. (or TTI) of Los Angeles, a joint venture of NEC Home Electronics and Hudson Soft. It was established to market NEC consoles in North America after NEC Home Electronics USA failed to effectively market the platform.

Since TTI understood that the price was too high for many people in their target market, they included a booklet of coupons for TurboDuo games and accessories, plus several pack-in games on two CD-ROMs: Ys Book I & II (1990) and a Super CD compilation of three of Hudson Soft's more popular TurboGrafx-16 titles plus a new title: Bonk's Adventure (1989), Bonk's Revenge (1991), Gate of Thunder (1992, only released separately in Japan), and Bomberman (1990); Bomberman was hidden as an Easter egg. The package also included one TurboChip game: Dungeon Explorer (Hudson Soft, 1989). Later, TTI replaced Dungeon Explorer with one of a variety of TurboChip titles, such as Ninja Spirit (Irem, 1990) and Final Lap Twin (Namco, 1989).

With the release of the TurboDuo, TTI reduced the retail price of the TurboGrafx-CD peripheral for the TurboGrafx-16 to $150.00, and began marketing the Super System Card, which enabled the TurboGrafx-CD to play the new Super CD games. The Super System Card is programmed with the updated v3.0 BIOS, and increases the TurboGrafx-CD's RAM by 192 kilobytes. The TurboGrafx-CD requires the updated BIOS to read Super CD discs, and the additional RAM to run the software capably. The Super System Card retailed for US$65 or, when bundled with the TurboDuo's Super CD compilation disc, US$95. TTI also offered the Super System Card via mail order, which provided the original TurboGrafx-CD with the 192 KB RAM upgrade.

Unlike the previous consoles which used actual game characters as mascots, for the TurboDuo marketing campaign TTI created a character called "Johnny Turbo". Turbo, a superhero character, was the alter ego of Jonathan Brandstetter, who himself was based in part on real-life game developer and TurboDuo brand manager John C. Brandstetter. Consisting of a three comic campaign that ran in issues of Electronic Gaming Monthly, the stories featured Johnny opposing agents of the company "FEKA" (a thinly veiled parody of Sega) who were tricking children into buying their CD-based add-on instead of the TurboDuo. Reactions to the advertising campaign were negative, with Jonathan J. Burtenshaw of GameSpy decrying them as "petty" and "overly confrontational," and further conjectured that it hurt TurboDuo sales. Despite this Turbo would later resurface as a playable character voiced by Brandstetter in the 2019 puzzle game Crystal Crisis, and in name and image only for Johnny Turbo's Arcade, a Data East arcade game compilation for the Nintendo Switch produced by Brandstetter's company Flying Tiger Development.

== Technical specification ==
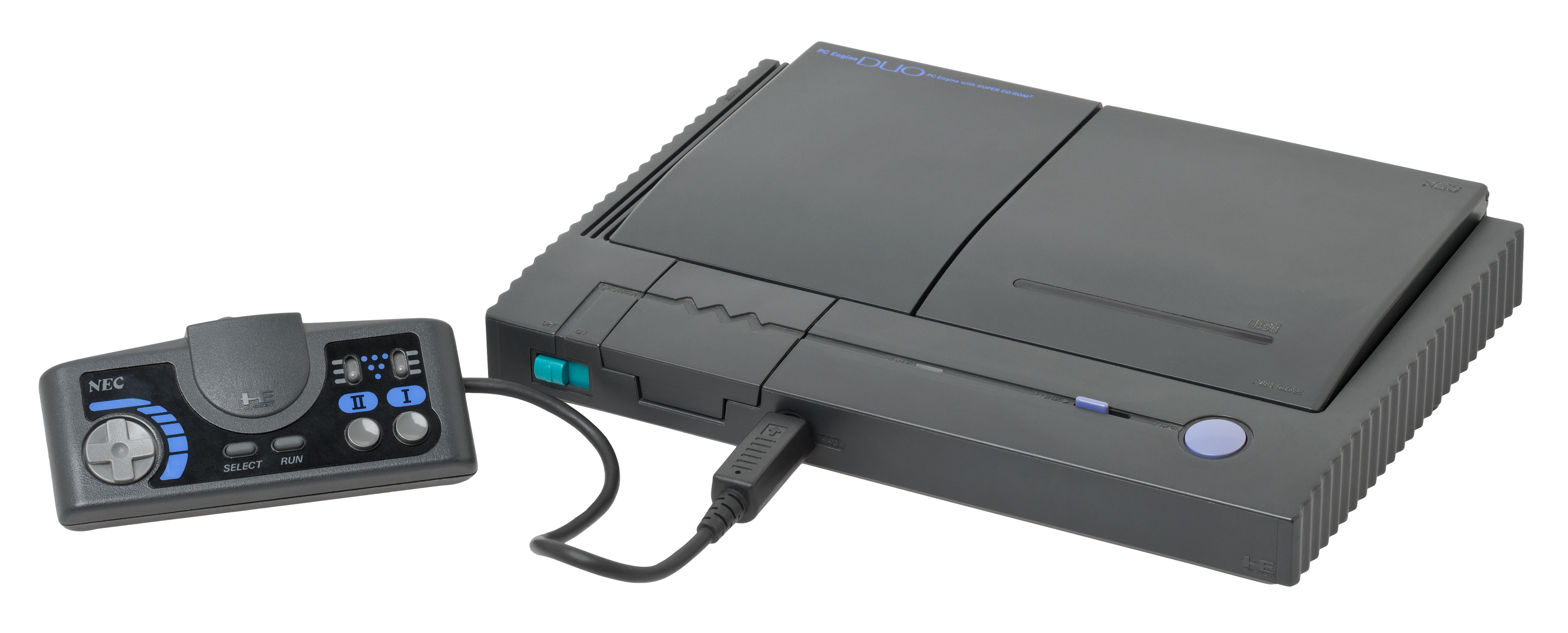
The Japanese PC Engine Duo

CPU
The Hudson Soft HuC6280 is a modified 65C02 with an effective clock rate of 1.79 or 7.16 MHz (switchable by software). The integrated components of this 8-bit processor include a timer, general-purpose I/O port, and bankswitching hardware (which drives a 21-bit external address bus from a 6502-compatible 16-bit address bus). It is capable of block transfer instructions, as well as dedicated move instructions for communicating with the TurboDuo's video display controller, the HuC6270A.

Video processing
- One 16-bit HuC6260 video color encoder (VCE)
- One 16-bit HuC6270A video display controller (VDC). Like the TMS99xx family of video display processors, it has port-based I/O.

Display resolution
- Horizontal lines: Maximum of 512, programmable in 8-pixel increments
- Vertical lines: Maximum of 240, programmable in 8-pixel increments

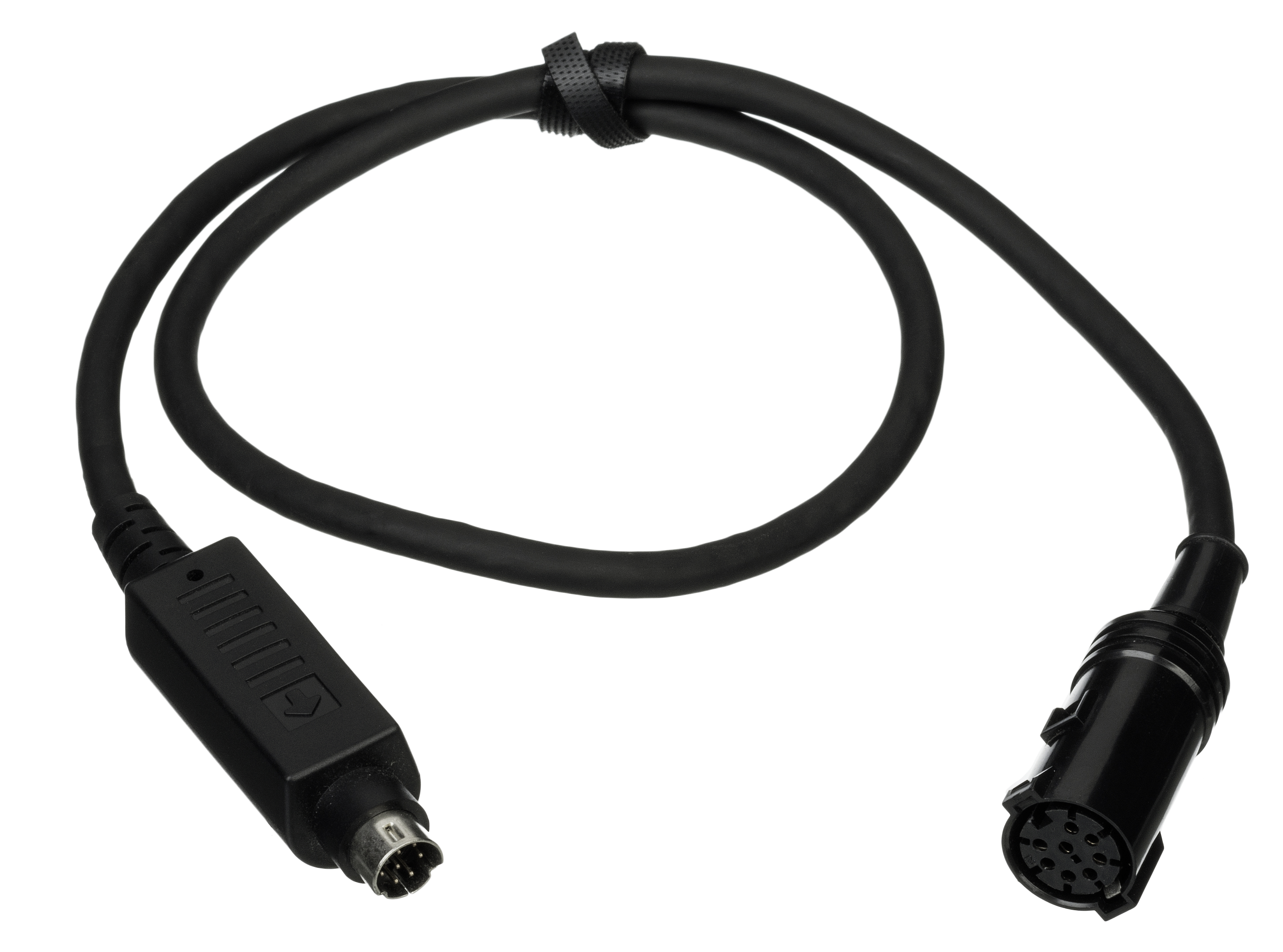
Since the TurboGrafx-16 used a different controller port, its input devices and peripherals required an adapter in order to be used on a TurboDuo.

Color
- Color depth: 9-bit
- 512-color palette (maximum of 481 colors on-screen: 241 for background tiles, 240 for sprites)
- Up to 32 palettes (16 for background tiles, 16 for sprites)
- Up to 16 colors per palette (15 colors + transparency)

Sprites
- Sizes: 16×16, 16×32, 32×16, 32×32, 32×64
- Simultaneously displayable: 64 (maximum of 8–16 per line, depending on sprite width)
- Each sprite can use up to 15 unique colors (one color must be reserved as transparent) via one of the 16 available sprite palettes.
- The HuC6270A VDC can display one sprite layer. Sprites could be placed either in front of or behind background tiles.

Tiles
Each 8×8-pixel background tile can use up to 16 unique colors via one of the 16 available background palettes. The first color entry of each background palette must be the same across all background palettes. The HuC6270A VDC can display one background layer.

Memory
- Work RAM: 8 KB
- Video RAM: 64 KB
- Additional 192 KB of built in Memory (System 3.0)

Sound
- Six wavetable synthesis audio channels, programmable through the HuC6280 CPU
- One ADPCM channel
- Compact Disc Digital Audio

Software media
- TurboChip (called HuCard in Japan), a thin, card-like ROM cartridge. Published games consumed up to 20 Mb (2.5 MB).
- CD-ROM² (pronounced "CD-ROM-ROM" in Japan), a proprietary CD-ROM-based media. Unlike the TurboGrafx-CD add-on, the TurboDuo could play standard CD-ROM² discs, as well Super CD-ROM² discs, without the need of a System Card. Early CD-ROM² games released in North America were branded as TurboGrafx-CD discs, but this relabeling fell into disuse after the launch of the TurboDuo in favor of keeping the CD-ROM² and Super CD-ROM² labeling used in Japan.

== See also ==
- List of TurboGrafx-16 games/PC Engine games
