= Layla (video game) =

1986 video game

- Cover art showing Layla (left) and Iris (right)
- Developer: dB-SOFT
- Publisher: dB-SOFT
- Directors: Hiroshi Ono; Seiichi Matsuno
- Producers: Naoto Shinada; Megumi Yoshida
- Programmers: Naoto Shinada; Hiroshi Ono; Yukiharu Nakajima
- Artist: Seiichi Matsuno
- Composer: Yasuhito Saitō
- Platform: Family Computer
- Release: JP: December 20, 1986
- Genre: Action
- Mode: Single-player

Layla (レイラ) is a side-scrolling action video game produced by dB-SOFT that was released in 1986 exclusively for the Family Computer.

== Gameplay ==
In a story inspired by Dirty Pair, Layla, a 17-year-old member of special forces group CAT, needs to rescue her team partner Iris who was kidnapped by the evil Dr. Manitoka. Eight asteroids have to be explored in search of Iris, each divided into two sections: the first part involving the surface of the asteroid while the second part deals with the actual enemy base.

The game's screen always scrolls from left to right and no backtracking is permitted on any level. While navigating through the cavern-like interiors of the asteroids, password disks must be retrieved. At the end of each base awaits a boss that must be defeated. When the player character's life reaches zero, she dies and immediately loses a life. A password is shown after the player game over so that players can resume their progress at a later date.

Several guns in addition to some hand grenades can be used; a handgun is the player's initial weapon, but more powerful weapons can be found by exploring. Every weapon has a limited amount of ammunition. Certain blocks can be broken by using the player's chosen weapon; the destroyable and non-destroyable blocks are sometimes indistinguishable. Bonus levels distributed throughout the game allow players to destroy squadrons of enemy ships while being completely impervious to their attacks.

== Reception ==
Reception

Review score
Publication	Score
Famitsu	5/10, 7/10, 7/10, 7/10

When Layla was announced in August 1986, originally scheduled to arrive in September, the game was noted for featuring the second heroine on the Family Computer, after Valkyrie from Valkyrie no Bōken: Toki no Kagi Densetsu (the gender of Samus Aran from Metroid was a secret). However, more female-protagonists games including Athena, The Wing of Madoola and Gall Force also arrived at around the same time as when it was finally released in December. Upon its release, the three reviewers in Weekly Famitsu complimented the cuteness of the main character in their review. The three reviewers from Marukatsu FC gave it an overall score of 11/15 (4, 4, 3).

== See also ==
- GameCenter CX, a Japanese TV program that featured the game in one of its challenges during the 11th season.
