= Seirei Senshi Spriggan =

1991 video game

- Developer: Compile
- Publisher: Naxat Soft
- Producer: Masamitsu Niitani
- Designer: Kazuyuki Nakashima
- Programmer: Yuichi Toyama
- Artist: Hiroshi Ryūōin
- Composers: Einosuke Nagao; Katsumi Tanaka; Keiji Takeuchi; Toshiaki Sakoda
- Platform: PC Engine CD-ROM²
- Release: JP: July 19, 1991
- Genre: Vertically scrolling shooter
- Mode: Single-player

Seirei Senshi Spriggan (Note: Japanese: 精霊戦士スプリガン, Hepburn: Seirei Senshi Supurigan; lit. "Spirit Warrior Spriggan") is a 1991 vertically scrolling shooter video game developed by Compile and published by Naxat Soft in Japan for the PC Engine CD-ROM². In the game, the player assume control of Jega and Rikart piloting the Spriggan in order to protect their country from the Buraizubara empire.

Seirei Senshi Spriggan was created for "Summer Carnival", an event hosted by Naxat Soft similar to Hudson Soft's "All-Japan Caravan Festival", by staff at Compile who previously worked on the Aleste series. The game was originally intended for the Sega Mega Drive but switched instead to PC Engine due to demand from players for Compile to make a shooter game for the platform. The team came up with a fantasy-theme title to differentiate it from MUSHA. The game was initially announced as part of the Aleste series under the working title Seirei Senshi Aleste but its name was changed prior to launch. Though initially launched for the PC Engine platform, Spriggan was re-released for the Wii's Virtual Console and later included as part of the PC Engine Mini console in its western variants, marking its first official appearance in North American and European regions. An English localization was slated to be published by Working Designs but it never released.

Seirei Senshi Spriggan garnered positive reception from critics since its release on the PC Engine CD-ROM², most of which reviewed it as an import title; praise was given to the overall presentation, rich and colorful visuals, variety of stages, weapon system, controls and gameplay. It was followed by Spriggan Mark 2: Re-Terraform Project (1992). Retrospective commentary has been positive.

== Gameplay ==
Gameplay screenshot

Seirei Senshi Spriggan is a science fantasy-themed vertically scrolling shoot 'em up game where the player assume the role of Jega and Rikart piloting the Spriggan to protect their country from the Buraizubara empire through six increasingly difficult stages, controlling their ship over a scrolling background until a boss is reached. Gameplay differs from previous Compile shooters, as the Spriggan can be equipped with three of four elemental orbs (fire, water, earth, and wind) dropped by defeated enemies that determines its main shot, allowing for 29 types of weapons depending on the combination of orbs. The elemental orbs can also be used as bombs to obliterate any enemy caught within its blast radius. Without any elemental orb, the Spriggan uses a standard shot instead.

In addition to the elemental orbs, a flashing orb can be collected, which destroys enemies on-screen and grants a shield to protect the Spriggan from enemy hits. The title uses a respawn system where players immediately starts at the location they died at. Getting hit by enemy fire or colliding against solid stage obstacles will result in losing a live, as well as a penalty of decreasing the ship's firepower to his original state and once all lives are lost, the game is over. Besides the main mode, there is also a score attack mode as well, where the player is tasked with reaching the highest score possible by destroying enemies.

== Development ==
Seirei Senshi Spriggan was created for "Summer Carnival", a shooting game competition hosted by Naxat Soft similar to Hudson Soft's "All-Japan Caravan Festival", by staff at Compile who previously worked on the Aleste series. Both Kazuyuki Nakashima and Yuichi Toyama served as game designers and planner, with Toyama also serving as main programmer, while Hiroshi Ryūōin acted as character designer. The soundtrack was scored by Einosuke Nagao, Katsumi Tanaka, Keiji Takeuchi and Toshiaki Sakoda.

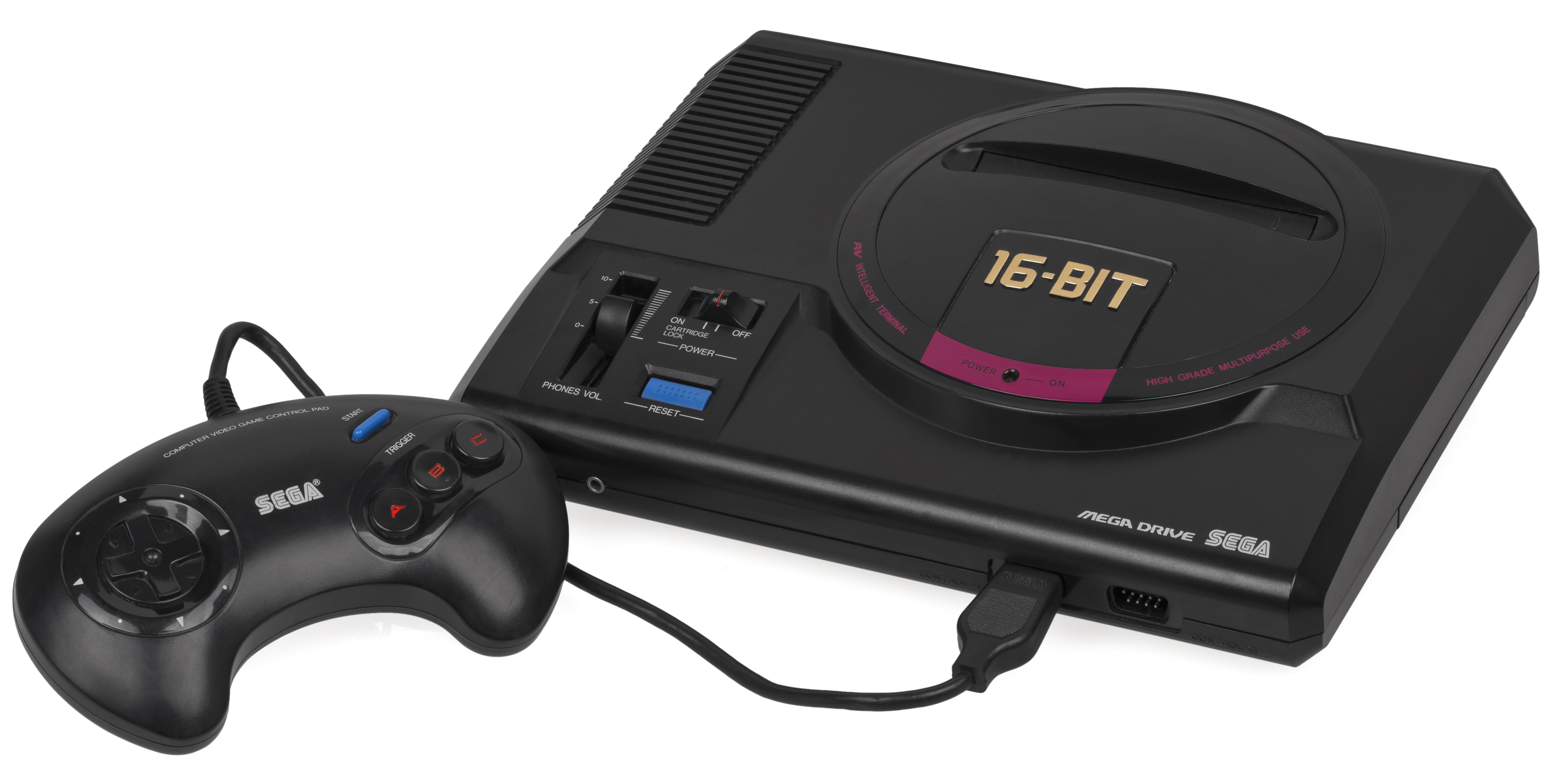
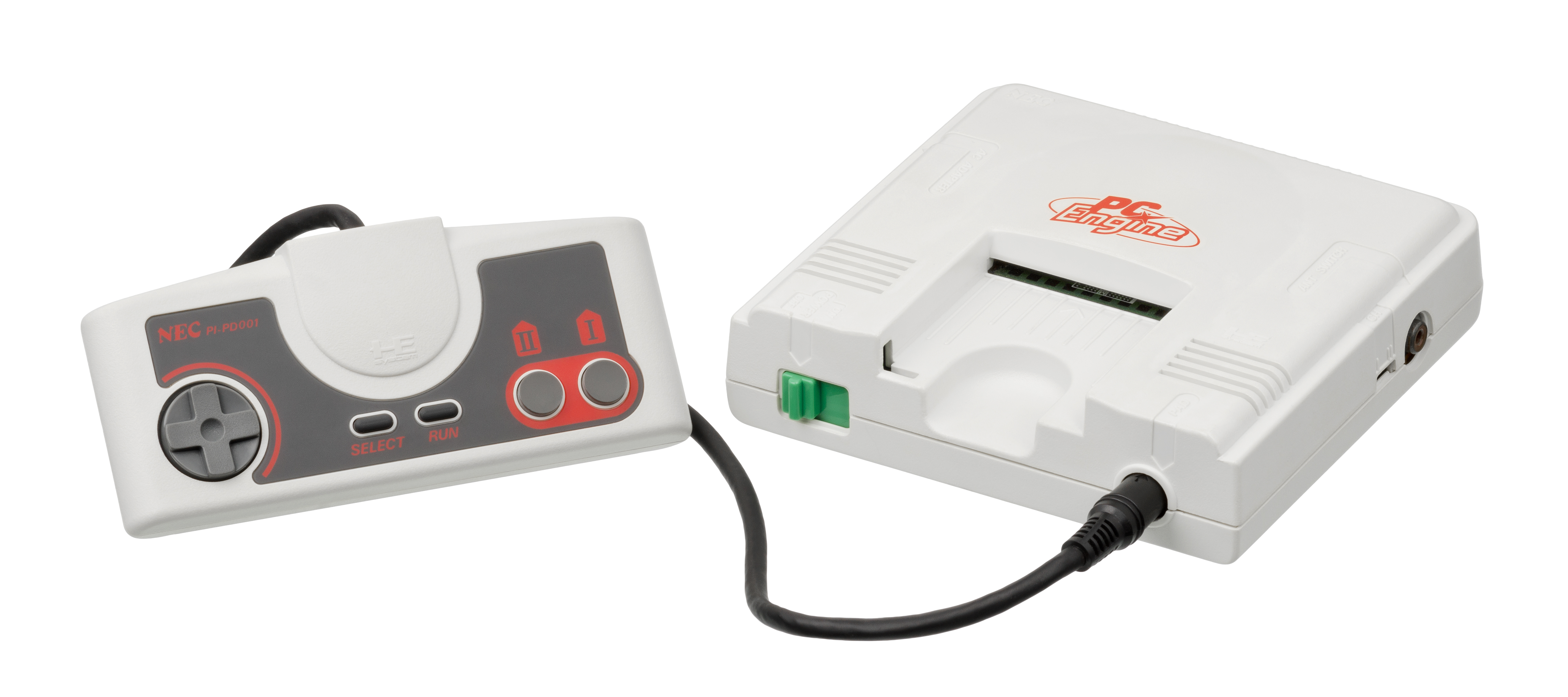
Seirei Senshi Spriggan was originally intended for the Sega Mega Drive but switched to PC Engine instead due to demand from players for Compile to make a shooter game for the platform.

Toyama recounted the project's development in a 2012 interview, stating that Spriggan was originally intended for the Sega Mega Drive but switched to PC Engine instead due to, according to producer Masamitsu Niitani, demand from players for Compile to make a shooter game for the platform. Toyama stated that the team came up with a fantasy-theme game to differentiate it from MUSHA. The game was initially announced as part of the Aleste series under the working title Seirei Senshi Aleste but the name was changed prior to launch; Kurt Kalata of Hardcore Gaming 101 speculated that the change was due to Naxat Soft wanting their own shooter brand.

Toyama claimed that the PC Engine had a larger color palette compared to the Mega Drive but limited to one background layer. Once the team began developing for the console, Toyama realized they could make "something great" due to its faster CPU speed and CD-ROM technology allowing full voice-acting. Supervisor Takayuki Hirono also lent Toyama the code for Blazing Lazers, which the team used a "lot of code" from it.

== Release ==
Seirei Senshi Spriggan was first released for the PC Engine CD-ROM² by Naxat Soft in Japan on July 19, 1991. After its release, the game was demonstrated at the 1991 Tokyo Toy Show during summer. An English localization, under the title Ghost Warrior Spriggan, was showcased by Turbo Technologies at the 1992 Summer Consumer Electronics Show and slated to be published by Working Designs in 1993, but was never released. The game was later re-released for the Wii's Virtual Console in Japan on July 8, 2008. The title was included in both the Japanese and western variants of the PC Engine Mini console in 2020, marking its first official appearance in North American and European regions.

== Reception ==
Reception

Review scores
Publication	Score
Consoles +	83%
Famitsu	6/10, 6/10, 8/10, 5/10
GameFan	319/400
Génération 4	90%
Joypad	93%
Joystick	95%

Seirei Senshi Spriggan garnered positive reception from critics since its release on the PC Engine CD-ROM², most of which reviewed it as an import title. Public reception was also positive: readers of PC Engine Fan voted to give Spriggan a 21.48 out of 30 score, ranking at the number 203 spot in a poll, indicating a popular following. Famitsu's four reviews felt that the enemy patterns were not smart. Consoles Plus' Kaneda Kun praised the overall presentation, colorful visuals, soundtrack and frenetic gameplay but felt mixed in regards to its longevity. Philippe Querleux of French magazine Génération 4 highly commended the rich and colorful graphics, sound, sprite animations and playability. Likewise, Joystick's Jean-Marc Demoly and Alain Huyghues-Lacour of French publication Joypad gave positive remarks to the stage variety, weapon system, large bosses, audiovisual presentation and controls, regarding it to be better than Gunhed. GameFan's four reviewers noted the lack of slowdown and fast action but ultimately felt that it was an average shooter.

Retrospective reviews for Seirei Senshi Spriggan have been equally positive. David Borrachero and Antxiko of Spanish magazine RetroManiac regarded it as one of the best games on the PC Engine platform. Hardcore Gaming 101's Kurt Kalata remarked that the weapon system was confusing and felt that the synthesized soundtrack lacked in both intensity and catchiness compared to MUSHA. Nevertheless, Kalata regarded Spriggan as one of the best titles from Compile's library, and one of the best shooters for PC Engine. The Japanese book PC Engine Complete Guide 1987-1999 acclaimed the original PC Engine CD-ROM² release for its production and feeling of exhilaration reminiscent of Final Soldier, calling it a "masterpiece shooter". Norihiko Ike of Japanese website Game Watch also gave the game a positive retrospective outlook with its inclusion on the PC Engine Mini. EGM's Mollie L. Patterson called it a cult classic of the PC Engine.
