= MUSHA =

1990 video game

- Developer: Compile
- Publishers: JP: Toaplan; NA: Seismic Software
- Producer: Masamitsu Niitani
- Designer: Kazuyuki Nakashima
- Programmer: Yuichi Toyama
- Composer: Toshiaki Sakoda
- Series: Aleste
- Platform: Sega Genesis
- Release: JP: December 21, 1990; NA: February 1991
- Genre: Scrolling shooter
- Mode: Single-player

MUSHA (Note: In western releases, MUSHA, sometimes written as M.U.S.H.A., is a backronym for "Metallic Uniframe Super Hybrid Armor". In Japanese, "musha" (武者) means "warrior". The game is known in Japan as Musha Aleste (武者アレスタ; lit. "Aleste Warrior"), although the title screen provides a longer name of Musha Aleste: Fullmetal Fighter Ellinor (武者アレスタ FULLMETAL FIGHTER ELLINOR).) is a vertically scrolling shooter video game developed by Compile for the Sega Genesis. An entry in Compile's shooter series, Aleste, MUSHA places the player in the role of a flying mecha pilot who must destroy a large super intelligent computer threatening planet Earth. The game had a working title of Aleste 2 and originally featured a style similar to the first game, but this was changed to a more original Japanese aesthetic and speed metal soundtrack.

Initial reception for MUSHA was mixed. Critics generally agreed the game was enjoyable with great graphics, but found themselves overwhelmed by the number of scrolling shooters on the Genesis and felt the title was unremarkable and lacked challenge. The game was re-released on the Wii Virtual Console by Naxat Soft in Japan in 2008 and the West in 2009. It was re-released again on the Nintendo Classics service in 2021 by Sega. MUSHA has been more well-received in retrospective reviews, where it is cited for its challenging gameplay, strong soundtrack, and graphics that were ahead of its time.

== Gameplay ==
MUSHA features a Japanese aesthetic, including this boss character with a Noh mask.

MUSHA is a vertically scrolling shooter. The player takes on the role of Terri, (Note: In Japanese: エリノア (Erinoa, lit. "Ellinor")) a pilot who flies a specially designed mecha vehicle with advanced weaponry called a MUSHA. She is sent to fight the human-built Dire 51 (Note: In Japanese: 大亜 (Daia, lit. "Great Asia")) supercomputer that has begun attacking Earth from space in the year 2290. The gameplay conventions are largely retained from earlier Aleste titles. The player has a main gun that can be powered up by collecting "Power Chips". There are also three different special weapons that can be picked up: piercing lasers, fire-based explosives and rotating shields. They can be upgraded if the same weapon is picked up that is currently being used. If hit while a special weapon is equipped, the player will lose the special weapon but remain alive. Getting hit without a special weapon will result in losing a life. For every three Power Chips collected, the player obtains a drone similar to those in the Gradius series. Only two drones can be equipped at any one moment; extras are stored. These drones can be set to one of six attack modes, such as aiming forward, behind, or rotating around the player.

== Development ==
A young team at Compile developed MUSHA in less than a year. They originally made a prototype for a new game in the Aleste series called "Aleste 2" for the Sega Genesis, but postponed the project. The team was still feeling pressure to create a game, and also wanted to change the direction of the Aleste series. Designer Kazuyuki Nakashima came up with a design that ignored most of the style of previous Aleste games and instead went with a Japanese aesthetic, including a character with a Noh mask. This change in direction motivated the team to pick up remnants of "Aleste 2" and push it into a new direction.

The valley stage in MUSHA utilizes the Genesis's vertical parallax scrolling capabilities, which was later highlighted by critics as one of the game's most impressive technical features. The stage was programmed by Yuichi Toyama, who also programmed the enemies that move in and out of the depths of the valley, and tiles that fall into the screen in other stages. Toyama worked with the sound effects programmer Masanobu Tsukamoto to modulate the frequency of the sound effects when objects moved in and out of the screen to simulate the Doppler effect.

=== Music ===
"Fullmetal Fighter"
"Fullmetal Fighter" plays during the game's opening stage. The entire soundtrack is heavy metal inspired.

For MUSHA's soundtrack, Nakashima originally presented an idea for what he called "Edo Metal" music to composer Toshiaki Sakoda. They eventually agreed on creating a speed metal soundtrack which would match the fast scrolling action of the game. At the time MUSHA was developed, Sakoda felt most shooting game soundtracks were primarily fusion and mechanically sounding games that lacked a cohesive theme. He wanted this soundtrack to be the first heavy metal game soundtrack, or how he called it, a "heavy metal suite" or "heavy metal rhapsody".

To compose the music, Sakoda used real instruments, then notated the music on an MSX computer and converted it onto a PC-9800. Since he did not like mechanical sounds, he programmed the virtual instruments to sound like they were played by humans. Sakoda worked closely with sound effects programmer Masanobu Tsukamoto. Since the game had limited sound channels, or tracks, he exercised caution not to create too many simultaneous sounds so the sound effects would not cut out the music. Sakoda only had four channels to use in any given song, one of which was always fixed on drums. After the soundtrack was nearly finished, Compile leadership told Sakoda to change the music to something which fit the Japanese aesthetic. After hearing a new soundtrack with plucky Japanese instruments, leadership told Sakoda to revert to his original music.

=== Release ===
MUSHA was first released in Japan on December 21, 1990 by Toaplan, who themselves are also known for shooter games. It was released in North America the following year by Seismic Software.

== Reception ==
Initial reception

Review scores
Publication	Score
Computer and Video Games	70%
Famitsu	27/40
MegaTech	71%
Raze	80%
Sega Pro	80%
Sega Force	70%

MUSHA received mixed reviews at release. Critics found themselves overwhelmed by the number of shoot 'em ups on the Sega Genesis, and considered MUSHA to be another standard shooter offering. Many wrote about the graphics in positive light. Richard Leadbetter from Computer and Video Games found the visuals to be smooth and highlighted the parallax scrolling effect in the canyon level. Frank Martinez Jr. from GameFan also praised the parallax scrolling in addition to the enemy and character sprite detail. The writers at Raze positively noted the game's oriental design and explosion effects. The game's difficulty was a common point of criticism. Many noted MUSHA to be too easy and too short. Some wrote that it may be fun for shooter novices, but more experienced players would find it unchallenging. The music also received mixed comments. Leadbetter concluded that "MUSHA is a smooth playable blast, but it's a shame it's so unoriginal and unchallenging".

Retrospective reviews for the re-release of MUSHA on the Wii's Virtual Console in 2009 were much more positive. Both Lucas M. Thomas of IGN and Damien McFarren of Nintendo Life praised the title's detailed graphics, fast-paced soundtrack, and tough difficulty. Since the original cartridges have become rare and expensive, both reviewers also commended the release for providing players an accessible way to play it. McFarren concluded by calling it one of the best shoot 'em ups on the Sega Genesis and the 16-bit era overall. Thomas called it one of the best "classic shooters". Levi Buchanan of IGN placed MUSHA at number five on his "Top 10 Classic Shoot 'Em Ups" list, dubbing it Compile's greatest shooter and one of the best shooters on the Genesis.
