= Bloody Roar (video game) =

1997 fighting video game

- Japanese arcade flyer
- Developers: Raizing (arcade); Hudson Soft (PS)
- Publishers: JP: Hudson Soft; NA: Sony Computer Entertainment (PS); EU: Virgin Interactive (PS)
- Directors: Kenji Fukuya; Susumu Hibi
- Producers: Kunji Katsuki; Masato Toyoshima
- Designer: Seiya Yamanaka
- Programmer: Yūichi Ochiai
- Artists: Shinichi Ōnishi; Naochika Morishita
- Composers: Arcade; Atsuhiro Motoyama; Kenichi Koyano; PlayStation; Takayuki Negishi
- Series: Bloody Roar
- Platforms: Arcade, PlayStation
- Release: Arcade: JP: July 1997; PlayStation: JP: November 6, 1997; PAL: January 16, 1998; NA: March 5, 1998
- Genre: Fighting
- Modes: Single player, multiplayer
- Arcade system: Sony ZN-1

Bloody Roar (Note: Japanese: ブラッディロア, Hepburn: Buraddi Roa) is a 1997 fighting game originally released in arcades and later ported to the PlayStation. Developed by Raizing and published by Hudson Soft, it features a transformation mechanic that lets players shapeshift into powerful animal forms for enhanced strength, speed, and unique moves.

The game's narrative is set within a framework involving the Gaia hypothesis and genetic intervention, where humanity's impact on the environment prompts the emergence of "zoanthropes", individuals capable of shifting into powerful beast forms. The Tyron Corporation exploits this genetic potential to develop biological weapons through experimentation and control. The single-player campaign follows an interconnected cast of characters as they confront Tyron's operations.

Upon release, the PlayStation version received generally positive reviews for its fast-paced, fluid gameplay, precise controls, innovative transformation system, and strong technical performance, though the character roster was noted for its limited size and lack of appeal. It is the first installment in the Bloody Roar series, and was followed by a sequel, Bloody Roar 2, in 1998.

== Gameplay ==
Screenshot of the arcade version

Bloody Roar is a 3D fighting game featuring a roster of eight characters. The basic controls involve punching, kicking, and directional inputs, which support the execution of combos, air juggles, linking moves, counters, guard reversals, guard crushes, and throw recoveries. Sidestepping, a feature added in the North American PlayStation version, is executed via the shoulder buttons. Combat takes place within enclosed arenas, with players being able to throw opponents against walls or fences, allowing for wall juggles and corner traps; the walls can be destroyed if a player propels an opponent against them with sufficient force, enabling ring-outs. The characters build a Beast meter through attacks, with a full meter allowing transformation into an animal form that grants enhanced speed, strength, new moves, extended range, and partial health recovery, though opponents can revert them via sustained damage. The PlayStation-exclusive Beast Rave mode, which can be activated in beast form, temporarily boosts speed by 25 percent and enables rapid attack chaining at the expense of draining the Beast meter.

The game features a single-player Arcade campaign and a two-player Vs. mode; in the latter, players may choose a stage and set health handicaps. Other single-player modes include Time Attack (in which the player must achieve the shortest finishing time), Survival (in which health does not fully recover between rounds), and Practice (in which the player controls the opponent's behavior, facilitating the rehearsal of combos). The game includes a spectator mode in which computer-controlled opponents engage in a match. From the options screen, the player can adjust computer opponents' skill level, specify the duration allotted for each round, establish the number of rounds required for victory, enable or disable blood effects, and configure the destructibility of walls. Completing the Arcade campaign with different characters unlocks new modes of play, which can be toggled in the Bonus screen; for example, the "No Gauge" mode renders the health and Beast meters invisible.

== Plot ==
The Gaia theory postulates that Earth is a single living organism, while humanity is a mere "cell" threatening both itself and the planet through the destructive process of civilization. In ancient times, Gaia, foreseeing the danger posed by the intelligent but physically frail humans, subtly intervened in human evolution. It inserted genetic material from other species into the human genome, creating a dormant "trigger" meant to activate under extreme environmental stress. This would birth a new kind of human, "zoanthropes", capable of transforming into powerful beast forms with extraordinary strength, speed, and animalistic traits, reducing their reliance on civilization and allowing them to survive in a collapsing world.

However, human genes rejected this foreign DNA, suppressing the trigger for millennia despite historical environmental damage. The plan remained latent until modern times, when the multinational corporation Tyron discovered this hidden genetic code while analyzing the human genome. Recognizing its potential, Tyron's weapons division classified the findings as top secret and began exploiting the trigger to engineer zoanthropes as biological weapons. Through its experiments (often involving kidnapping, forced awakening of dormant powers, and mind control), Tyron created artificial zoanthropes and hunted natural ones for study and weaponization.

Suddenly, zoanthropes began manifesting worldwide. Some transformations occurred naturally under stress or genetic predisposition, while others resulted from Tyron's interventions or Gaia's desperate acceleration of the process, infusing its life energy into individuals with an activated trigger to force rapid changes and stabilize the new species amid the escalating crisis. The game's narrative centers on eight interconnected characters drawn into this conspiracy:

- Yugo Ōgami, a wolf zoanthrope, seeks the truth about his father Yuji's death. Yuji, a skilled mercenary and fellow zoanthrope, reportedly died on a mission in South America. Yugo suspects Tyron's involvement and hunts survivor Alan Gado, his father's comrade. When Tyron attacks Yugo to silence his investigation, rage and danger trigger his first transformation. Rescued by wanderer Jin Long, Yugo presses on, driven by personal vengeance rather than justice.
- Alice Tsukagami, a rabbit zoanthrope, was kidnapped as a child by Tyron and raised as a test subject. The experiments artificially awakened her powers, and she was trained in combat. Before she could be brainwashed, she escaped with help from fellow captive Uriko, who sacrificed herself as a decoy. Haunted by guilt, Alice shifts from hiding to actively fighting Tyron to rescue Uriko and halt the weaponization program. Despite her traumatic past, she remains cheerful and embraces her "cute" rabbit form.
- Hans "Fox" Taubemann, an artificial fox zoanthrope, is a cruel assassin hired by Tyron. Abandoned young and hardened in the slums, he revels in violence but despises his "ugly" beast form and all zoanthropes, projecting his deep insecurities about his abandonment and perceived ugliness.
- Ryuzo "Bakuryu" Kato, an artificial mole zoanthrope, is a mysterious ninja-like assassin and Tyron loyalist. Ruthless and power-hungry, he willingly underwent conversion to enhance his stealth and strength.
- Jin Long, a tiger zoanthrope, is a former Tyron assassin who defected. Cursed by his bloodline and tragic family losses, he suppresses his powers through willpower and martial discipline, viewing transformation as a rampage to avoid. His presence mysteriously awakens dormant zoanthropes in others.
- Alan Gado, a lion zoanthrope, is a mercenary who survived the ambush that seemingly claimed Yuji's unit. Blinded in one eye, he wages a solo war against Tyron for revenge and answers. Honorable and principled, he embraces his beast form only against worthy foes.
- Mitsuko Nonomura, a wild sow zoanthrope, is a devoted mother whose daughter Uriko was kidnapped by Tyron. Hailing from a lineage of latent zoanthropes, her maternal fury triggers full transformation as she searches desperately for Uriko, attacking perceived threats instinctively.
- Gregory "Greg" Jones, a gorilla zoanthrope, is an optimistic circus ringmaster. After his troupe's bankruptcy, he recruits zoanthropes as star performers, viewing their abilities as natural talents rather than anomalies. Persistent and good-natured, he tries forcing recruitment by transforming if he is refused.

The single-player campaign culminates in a final boss encounter with Uriko, an artificial chimera zoanthrope. Alice fights to save Uriko, and is later adopted by her aunt Mitsuko after the rescue. Bakuryu undergoes molecular decomposition and is dismissed as a failed prototype by Tyron's scientists. Yugo and Gado discover that Yūji was killed by Tyron's experiments, fueling their assault on the corporation, and Gado returns to the battlefield after destroying Tyron. Meanwhile, Fox suffers a breakdown after inadvertently killing his mother, Long goes into a self-imposed exile, and Greg attempts to recruit Yugo into his circus before pivoting to starring himself.

== Development and release ==
Bloody Roar was developed by Raizing and published by Hudson Soft in July 1997 for the Sony ZN-1 arcade board. Director Kenji Fukuya felt that fighting games between ordinary human characters were somewhat dull and originally wanted to showcase superpowered characters similar to the Super Saiyans of Dragon Ball, with Eighting originating the beast theme. In North America, the arcade version was released under the title Beastorizer, and the PlayStation version was shown at E3 1997 with the title. The visual design of the game was created by Mitsuakira Tatsuta (who also designed the characters of the game) and Shinsuke Yamakawa. The arcade soundtrack was composed by Atsuhiro Motoyama, Kenichi Koyano, Manabu Namiki, Hitoshi Sakimoto, Masaharu Iwata and Tomoko Miyagi. Takayuki Negishi composed and arranged original music for the PlayStation version. The music was recorded at Sound City, Tower Side, FE1, with Takayuki Hijikata and Makoto Matsushita on guitars, Michio Nagaoka on bass and Toshinobu Takimoto on drums. The arcade version's soundtrack was released on compact disc by Wonder Spirits on December 17, 1997, while the PlayStation version's soundtrack was released on compact disc by Kitty Records on December 20.

Bloody Roar was released for the PlayStation in Japan on November 6, 1997; in Europe, it was published by Virgin Interactive Entertainment and released on January 16, 1998, and in North America, it was published by Sony Computer Entertainment and released on March 5, 1998. It was re-released on the PlayStation Network in North America on August 20, 2009.

== Reception ==
Reception (PlayStation version)

Aggregate score
Aggregator	Score
GameRankings	78%

Review scores
Publication	Score
Computer and Video Games	4/5
Electronic Gaming Monthly	8.5/10, 8.5/10, 8/10, 6.5/10
Game Informer	8.5/10
GameFan	95%, 98%, 96%
GameSpot	7.7/10
IGN	8/10
Joystick	86%
Next Generation	4/5
Official U.S. PlayStation Magazine	3.5/5
PlayStation: The Official Magazine	4/5
Superjuegos	94%
Video Games (DE)	86%
Dengeki PlayStation	70/100, 90/100, 75/100, 75/100

The PlayStation version of Bloody Roar was met with a generally positive reception upon release. Reviewers consistently highlighted the game's gameplay depth and speed, explaining that it incorporates elements from multiple established fighters while introducing distinctive features that elevate the experience. The core fighting system was said to blend influences from Tekken, Virtua Fighter, and Fighting Vipers, delivering smooth 3D movement, sidestepping, juggles, air combos, guard reversals, counters, and wall interactions in enclosed arenas. The controls were frequently noted as accessible, precise, and suitable for both beginners and experienced players, with simple inputs enabling effective combos and special moves. The Beast transformation mechanic was singled out as the game's most innovative contribution, allowing characters to morph into powerful animal forms with unique moves, enhanced attributes, and greater range. The additional Rave mode was said to add strategic layers by further amplifying speed and combo potential at the cost of draining the Beast meter.

The technical aspects, particularly the graphics and performance, drew strong acclaim. The engine was often deemed comparable to or even superior in smoothness to Tekken 2 (1995), described as featuring high frame rates, stable performance, impressive lighting effects, detailed textures, dynamic shadows, and spectacular beast transformation animations. Andrew Reiner of Game Informer and "Scary Larry" of GamePro noted that the character models were somewhat blocky, and Scary Larry additionally cited disappearing walls and slowdown in the ruins stage as minor issues.

The audio elements received generally positive but more mixed assessments. The sound effects, such as the transformation cues, impact noises, and digitized animal sounds, were praised for their quality and sense of immersion. "Doc" of Superjuegos appreciated the charismatic quality of both the arcade and PlayStation-specific music options. Others found the hard rock/heavy metal style repetitive, limited in variety, or unappealing. Douglass Perry of IGN singled out Alice's vocalizations as annoying, calling her a "broken record" and negatively comparing her to Demonica from Dark Rift (1997).

The narrative, character design, and content volume elicited more reserved or critical responses. The character designs and personalities were frequently described as functional yet generic or lacking memorability and emotional appeal compared to those in Tekken or Street Fighter, with Next Generation dismissing their backstories as uninteresting, and Ralph Karens of Video Games regarding the victory screens as inadequate motivation. The roster of only eight base characters drew repeated criticism for feeling limited, even with the dual human-beast forms providing additional variety, and reviewers noted a scarcity of unlockable content or hidden fighters.

In its first month of release in North America, Bloody Roar was the 20th best-selling video and computer game by unit sales. The game was nominated for "Console Fighting Game of the Year" in the Academy of Interactive Arts & Sciences' 1st Annual Interactive Achievement Awards, losing to WCW vs. nWo: World Tour (1997).

== Sequels ==
Bloody Roar was followed by a series of four sequels, consisting of Bloody Roar 2 (1998), Bloody Roar 3 (2000), Bloody Roar Extreme (2002), and Bloody Roar 4 (2003).
