= Recca =

1992 video game

- Developer: KID
- Publisher: Naxat Soft
- Programmer: Shinobu Yagawa
- Composer: Nobuyuki Shioda
- Platform: Family Computer
- Release: JP: July 17, 1992
- Genre: Scrolling shooter
- Mode: Single-player

Recca (Note: Also known as Summer Carnival '92: Recca (Japanese: サマーカーニバル'92 烈火, Hepburn: Samā Kānibaru '92: Rekka; lit. "Raging Fire" or "Blazing Fire")) is a 1992 scrolling shooter video game developed by KID and published by Naxat Soft for the Family Computer. Controlling the titular space fighter craft, the player is sent to counterattack an invading alien armada while avoiding collision with their projectiles and other obstacles. The ship has a powerful bomb at its disposal that can be used as shield and clear the screen of enemies and bullets when fully charged.

Known for pushing the Famicom hardware to the limits with its uncompromising high number of sprites and speed, Recca was created for a shooting game competition hosted by Naxat Soft called "Summer Carnival", which took place on July 17, 1992 and featured alongside the PC Engine CD-ROM² shooter Alzadick. It was programmed by Shinobu Yagawa, whose later works includes Battle Garegga, Ibara, Pink Sweets: Ibara Sorekara and Muchi Muchi Pork!. The game was released in Japan amid focus shifting to the Super Famicom, resulting in few copies sold when released to the market and is considered by gaming journalists as one of the rarest, most valuable and sought-after Famicom titles.

Recca received mostly positive reception from critics for pushing the Famicom to its limits; praise was given to its action, game modes, music and fun factor but criticism was geared towards the unsuitable difficulty for beginners and graphics. It was re-released worldwide on the 3DS Virtual Console via Nintendo eShop in 2012 and 2013, marking the game's first international appearance. Retrospective commentary has been positive and is regarded as a precursor to modern bullet hell games.

== Gameplay ==
The second stage

Recca is a fast-paced vertically scrolling shooter where the player controls the Recca415 space fighter craft in the year 2302. An invading alien armada plans to destroy mankind after obliterating the Andromeda galaxy shortly after humans made a peace agreement with its inhabitants. There aree three modes of play: "Normal Game", "Score Attack" and "Time Attack". A fourth game mode, "Zanki Attack", is hidden and only accessible via cheat code.

In normal mode, the player must destroy incoming enemies and face bosses while avoiding collision with their bullets and other obstacles across four stages. The Recca ship can be equipped with five distinct main weapons, each with their own advantages and disadvantages. In addition, the ship can also be equipped with two satellite-like options by collecting five sub-weapons that fire in multiple directions. These power-up items are dropped from enemies after being destroyed and can be upgraded by collecting the respective weapon icon. Enemies also spawn 1UPs after destroying multiple enemy waves. Unique to the game is the charging shield: when not firing the main weapon for a brief time period, an energy shield is charged in front of the ship capable of absorbing standard enemy projectiles and obliterate any enemy caught within its blast radius when launched. Finishing the first loop in normal mode unlocks a more difficult second loop, consisting of seven rearranged stages.

In score attack, the player is tasked with reaching the highest score possible by destroying enemies within a two-minute time limit. In time attack, the player is tasked with finishing two stages in the best record possible under a five-minute time limit. In "Zanki Attack", players are given fifty lives but enemies spawn suicide bullets when destroyed, with bonus points given out after finishing the game with the remaining lives. Getting hit by enemy fire or colliding against solid stage obstacles will result in losing a life, with a penalty of decreasing the ship's firepower to its original state and once all lives are lost, the game is over.

== Development ==
Recca was created by KID, a contract developer who worked on American-focused games for Taxan, for a shooting game competition hosted by Naxat Soft called "Summer Carnival", which took place on July 17, 1992 and featured alongside the PC Engine CD-ROM² shooter Alzadick. The game was programmed by Shinobu Yagawa, whose later works at Raizing and Cave includes Battle Garegga, Ibara, Pink Sweets: Ibara Sorekara and Muchi Muchi Pork!. The visuals were drawn by a graphic designer only known by the pseudonym of "Etsuka" and the music was composed by Nobuyuki Shioda.

Shioda met Yagawa when assigned to compose songs for Recca, who requested him to score music that lasted four minutes, as Yagawa claimed they could make what they wanted for sound and "do the impossible on the Famicom." Shioda thought that four-on-the-floor dance music would fit for a shoot 'em up and stated that he first tried composing Eurobeat music, which did not fit. Wanting a dark and heavy sound for the game's hardcore techno-style atmosphere, Shioda listened to various CD albums for inspiration and Yagawa also lent him other albums, one of which was Detroit techno but he could not find sample materials for his work at the time, relying on Ryuichi Sakamoto's B-2 Unit (1980) album and recordings of Igor Stravinsky instead. For the musical style he wanted for the title, Shioda turned down the volume on the Famicom's two square wave channels to make low-end triangle wave sounds louder. Shioda also composed three "joke" songs for the sound test screen after being showed the image of a character called "Recca-chan" drawn by Etsuka during development.

Recca is known for pushing the Famicom hardware to the limits due to its uncompromising high number of sprites and speed. The game uses a technique similar to Contra, where sprite effects such as explosions are shown at 30 frames per second (fps) instead of 60 fps to work around the system's sprite limitations. Due to the amount of memory available on the cartridge, Shioda claimed that Yagawa was able to implement features such as the second loop and the boss sprite shown after the credits sequence for fun.

== Release ==
Recca was released for the Family Computer in Japan by Naxat Soft on July 17, 1992 during the "Summer Carnival" competition and in retail stores. Its late 1992 launch when focus was already on the Famicom's successor, the Super Famicom, coupled with few copies sold and reputation, makes the game harder to find and more expensive than earlier Famicom releases, becoming a rare collector's item that commands high prices on the secondary game collecting market. On September 21, 2005, an album featuring the game's music titled Legend Consumer Series - Summer Carnival '92 Recca Original Soundtrack was published in Japan by Scitron.

Recca was later re-released on the 3DS Virtual Console via Nintendo eShop in Japan on December 12, 2012. It was also released in PAL regions and North America on the Nintendo eShop on August 15 and September 5, 2013 respectively, marking the game's first international appearance.

== Reception ==
Reception

Review scores
Publication	Score
Famitsu	(FC) 19/40
Nintendo Life	(VC) 8/10
USgamer	(VC) 3/5
Oprainfall	(VC) 4/5
Top Secret	(FC) 5/5
Yuge	(FC) Positive

Recca received mostly positive reception from critics. However, public response was mixed; Japanese readers of Family Computer Magazine voted to give the title a 16.8 out of 30 score, indicating a middling following among the Famicom userbase. According to composer Nobuyuki Shioda, the game did not sell many copies during its release.

Famitsu's four reviewers commented that Recca is unsuitable for beginners and that there are too many onscreen objects to track—criticizing the graphics but praising the music. Brømba of Polish gaming magazine Top Secret gave the game a perfect rating in 1994, praising the fun factor, dynamic action, game modes, colorful visuals, and digitized soundtrack, regarding it as "one of the best in its class". A writer for Japanese magazine Yuge gave the title positive remarks for pushing the Famicom hardware, stating that "The pleasure of destroying enemies that are constantly attacking shifts to a feeling of ecstasy."

Retrospective reviews for Recca have been equally positive. Play's Dai Kohama praised the game's technical details for pushing the Famicom far beyond what would seem to be possible on the system, with high quality music and effects as well. Nintendo Life's Marcel van Duyn commented that "it's hard to recommend Recca to anybody but the most die-hard fans of the genre. Despite this, however, it is easily one of best and most impressive shoot 'em up games made for the system, and anybody who isn't afraid of a challenge (or using save states a lot) will find this a more than worthy pickup." USgamer's Jeremy Parish considers the game as a precursor to modern bullet hell games due to the number of objects and high speed bullets on-screen, commending the additional game modes and pushing limits of the Famicom hardware but criticizing the amount of flickering, controls, simple gameplay, and difficulty. Oprainfall's Will Whitehurst praised the audiovisual presentation, speed, detailed spritework, boss fights, replay value, and emulation quality but criticized the lack of additional plot details, sound balancing issues, and high difficulty curve. However, Hardcore Gaming 101's Kurt Kalata said that the blurry visual emulation of the 3DS Virtual Console "don't do the game any favors", and that it is not quite as impressive on the small screen. Time Extension noted the game as historically significant to the evolution of the bullet hell format.
