= Ibara (video game) =

2005 video game

- Developer: Cave
- Publishers: AMI (arcade); Taito (PS2)
- Director: Shinobu Yagawa
- Producer: Kenichi Takano
- Designer: Akira Wakabayashi
- Programmer: Shinobu Yagawa
- Artist: Toshiyuki Kotani
- Composer: Shinji Hosoe
- Platforms: Arcade, PlayStation 2
- Release: Arcade: JP: July 15, 2005; PlayStation 2: JP: February 23, 2006
- Genre: Scrolling shooter
- Modes: Single-player, multiplayer
- Arcade system: CAVE CV1000-B

Ibara (鋳薔薇) is a 2005 vertically scrolling shooter developed by Japanese developer Cave and published by Taito. It was ported to the PlayStation 2 in 2006.

== Gameplay ==
Arcade version screenshot

Ibara is similar to 8ing/Raizing's Battle Garegga and Battle Bakraid games and there are several similarities between them. These include combining archaic technology such as biplanes with more advanced machinery; firing and a power-up system; and a medal collecting system which drastically increases scoring. The game features a similar method of earning bombs and a delay when launching them as well. Some of the enemies and their attack patterns are familiar such as the large cranes in stage 1 and the minigun-wielding first boss. The enemy's explosions spiral around when destroying some of the heavier weapons/scenery and thin, while seemingly camouflaged enemy bullets are scattered around the play area in comparable patterns. More subtle references include the HUD layout which lists the name of the current stage at the top of the screen and, when starting a stage, tells users the title of the background music that is playing.

A notable feature of Ibara is the inclusion of a variable, real-time difficulty system by way of the Rank system. The player's rank increases as they acquire more items and cause more damage, increasing the difficulty of the game along with it. The number of enemies does not increase but the number of bullets fired towards the user does, often reaching a ridiculous level of bullet density. There are ways of lowering this rank system if the odds appear too much. The only known way of decreasing the player's Rank in Ibara is to die. The more lives the players have, the less the rank decreases when they die. In the later version, Ibara Kuro: Black Label, rank can be decreased by cancelling bullets with a bomb, but it also increases much faster in this version, potentially increasing from minimum to maximum in a matter of seconds.

== Development ==
Programmer Shinobu Yagawa previously worked on the games Recca and Battle Garegga.

== Release ==
The game was released in arcades on July 15, 2005, and was released on the PlayStation 2 on February 23, 2006.

To remedy some of the concerns fans had with the original version of the game, Cave released an updated version in limited distribution called Ibara Kuro: Black Label, released on February 10, 2006. The update contains many additions, some of which appeared earlier in the released PlayStation 2 port in the form of Arrange Mode.

A sequel, Pink Sweets: Ibara Sorekara, was released in the arcades on April 21, 2006.

== Reception ==
Weekly Famitsu magazine awarded the PlayStation 2 version of Ibara a score of 26/40 based on four reviews (7/7/6/6).
