= Armed Police Batrider =

1998 video game

- Arcade flyer
- Developer: Raizing
- Publisher: Eighting
- Programmer: Shinobu Yagawa
- Artists: Kazuyuki Nakashima; Hiroshi Yokoyama; Masayuki Taguchi; Masaharu Tokutake; Yuki Yonei
- Composers: Manabu Namiki; Kenichi Koyano; Hitoshi Sakimoto
- Platform: Arcade
- Release: 1998
- Genre: Scrolling shooter
- Modes: Single-player, multiplayer

Armed Police Batrider (アームドポリス バトライダー) is a futuristic vertically scrolling manic shooter arcade video game developed by Raizing and published by Eighting in 1998. The player controls teams of flying jet bikes (Batriders) each with their own pilot; players can choose up to three of nine standard characters plus another nine unlockable characters from Mahou Daisakusen and Battle Garegga. In 2022, the game was included as part of the Sega Astro City Mini V, a vertically-oriented variant of the Sega Astro City mini console, marking its first appearance outside arcades. In October 2026, it was announced by M2 (game developer) that the game will be rereleased, although at the time of the announcement it was not confirmed which platforms it would be included on together with the release date.

== Gameplay ==
Gameplay screenshot

Gameplay takes place across up to seven stages, with a varying number of bosses depending upon the player selection and whether certain hidden tasks have been performed during gameplay. During Advanced course, it is possible to fight as few as seven or as many as all eighteen of the game's bosses. Small and Large Shot powerups, Option powerups and medals drop frequently from popcorn enemies and fall down off the screen from where they spawn. Extra lives are granted every 1,500,000 points.

Pressing A fires the main Shot and, if the requisite powerups have been collected, the player's Options. Pressing B fires the Bomb and pressing nothing powers up the Aura, a small energy field at the front of the player which causes damage.

Batrider contains up to seven stages along with a large number of secrets, which are either unlockable with codes or DIP switch settings, or hidden within the game itself. In addition to selectable difficulty levels via dipswitch, there are also four player-selectable variants of the game:

- The Training course lasts for three stages: Manhattan City, one of the three Stage Edit stages below (unless left or right is held while selecting the course), and Highway. The game will automatically use any remaining bombs if the player takes a hit.
- The Normal course lasts for five stages: Manhattan City, Sky High/Airport/Sewage System in random order unless Stage Edit is enabled, and Highway. Bashinet mk2 appears as a secret boss in its own stage, Colosseum.
- The Advanced course consists of seven stages. It includes all Normal course stages, along with Zenovia City and Building. The Advanced course also includes additional secret bosses: Black Heart mk2 in Airport, and Bashinet R and Glow Squid in Zenovia City.
- The Special course is a boss rush mode using the Advanced course versions of the bosses, with the same criteria determining which bosses are fought as the other modes. In Japanese versions, it must be enabled via dipswitch.

== Plot ==
Armed Police Batrider takes place in the late 2010's. In the year 2014, Manhattan was plagued with unprecedented levels of crime. No measure of law enforcement seemed able to combat the strife and violence, and so a desperate plan was brought forth by GiganTech Cybertronics Corporation. This plan was the artificial island Zenovia, two kilometers south of Manhattan, which would be patrolled by GiganTech's own robotic creations. A rapid exodus from Manhattan to Zenovia resulted.

However, by 2019, the promise of tranquility has not been fulfilled. Even with all the expansions to Zenovia the population influx called for, it has become something of a slum, except for the massive GiganTech headquarters. There have been quarrels over whether or not Zenovia should be regarded as being the jurisdiction of the United States, or just GiganTech. Crime has grown even more rapidly than Manhattan ever knew, partly because the GiganTech machines have been promoting everything EXCEPT law and order. The most horrific aspect, though, is the result of an intelligence investigation from the government.

GiganTech's own executives, both then and now, are actually among the most dangerous criminals the country has ever known. Zenovia, far from being planned as a refuge from violence, was actually a trap and a testing ground for the weapons GiganTech plans to use to become the sole power of the underworld.

Neither police nor armies are willing to commit against the mechanical forces that GiganTech commands and invade Zenovia. Therefore, nine fighters—three police, three convicts, and three psychics—have been drafted as "Zero-Cops", riding the BatRider airbikes against the forces invading Manhattan and charging into Zenovia to take down GiganTech's CEO and his ultimate weapon, known only as "Discharge".

== Reception ==
In Japan, Game Machine listed Armed Police Batrider on their March 15, 1998 issue as being the sixth most-successful arcade game of the month.
