= Terra Diver =

1997 video game

Sōkyū Gurentai
- Sega Saturn cover art
- Developers: Raizing; Outback Pty (PS1)
- Publishers: JP: Raizing (arcade); JP: Electronic Arts Victor (Saturn); JP: Data East (PS1); JP: Hamster Corporation (PS1); JP: Eighting (Mobile)
- Composer: Hitoshi Sakimoto
- Platforms: Arcade, Sega Saturn, PlayStation, EZweb, i-mode, Yahoo! Keitai
- Release: Arcade: WW: September 1996; Sega Saturn: JP: February 7, 1997; PlayStation: JP: December 25, 1997; Mobile; EzWeb: JP: 2005; I-mode: JP: 2005; Yahoo!: JP: 2005
- Genre: Manic shooter
- Modes: Single-player, multiplayer
- Arcade system: Sega Titan Video (ST-V)

Sōkyūgurentai (Japanese: 蒼穹紅蓮隊, Hepburn: Sōkyū Gurentai), (Note: The title roughly translates to "Blue Sky Hooligans" or "Blue Sky Crimson Squad". The word Gurentai on the title, which is normally spelled 愚連隊, has the first two characters replaced with 紅蓮, which mean "red lotus" or crimson".) also known as Terra Diver, is a vertical-scrolling shooting game by Raizing originally released as an arcade game for the ST-V platform in 1996. The game was ported to the Sega Saturn and PlayStation in 1997, with neither port being released outside of Japan.

== Gameplay ==
Soukyugurentai is a vertical-scrolling shooter. The player picks one of three different ships - red, green or blue - each with their own pilot, fire pattern and laser web. Each ship has a standard gun and a bomb, but the most distinctive of these aspects is the laser-web: holding down the button for the standard gun will release a lock-on laser-web traditionally shaped as a cone or semicircle, which will destroy the enemies it locks onto after releasing the buttons. Each ship has two different lock-on weapons that function as web-designed laser targets. Once an enemy enters the web's range, the player can destroy the enemy or multiple enemies can be destroyed via homing lasers or multiple fireballs. The game is unusual in that, rather than using a 3:4 aspect ratio, to better suit the vertically oriented gameplay, it uses a horizontal monitor (4:3) in the style of Neo Geo vertical shooters as well as the later Radiant Silvergun and Giga Wing.

== Plot ==
In the 2050s, the Earth's environment deteriorated significantly, even after strict limits were placed on the use of fossil fuel and the emission of carbon dioxide. As a result, many space development corporations were established and began the construction of space colonies and the terraforming of other planets in the Solar System. The largest of these companies was the Jin-Sei Corporation, headquartered in Japan and founded by the Miama family.

To protect its corporate interests, the Jin-Sei Corporation established the private self-defense force JDF, also known as the Soukyugurentai. The JDF was armed with the S.O.Q. series of small general-purpose spacecraft, all of which were equipped with the No Blindspot All-range Laser System (N.A.L.S.). Throughout the course of the game, the JDF comes into conflict with various groups acting against Jin-sei, including the corporate terrorist group Small and Medium Enterprises Liberation Front, the anti-space development eco-terrorist group Little Earth, and Jin-Sei's rival corporation, the Bafu Interstellar Development Company.

== Releases ==
Soukyu Gurentai was first distributed for the arcades in Japan in September 1996. The game was released as a cartridge kit for Sega's ST-V arcade system board. While the game was never widely distributed outside Japan, inserting the cartridge on a foreign ST-V board will set the in-game language to English and change the title to Terra Diver (both titles are printed on the cartridge's label).

A Sega Saturn version was released by Electronic Arts in February 1997, five months after the arcade release. Because the original arcade hardware was directly based on the Sega Saturn architecture, this is a close conversion of the original game. Several options and features were also added, including a practice mode which allows the player to try out any of the game's stages without going through the entire campaign, as well as support for the Multi Controller and Mission Stick. A bargain-priced version was released in December 1997, titled Sōkyū Gurentai Okuyō (蒼穹紅蓮隊 御徳用), which includes a demo for the Saturn version of Battle Garegga.

A PlayStation version was also released by Data East in December 1997 titled Sōkyū Gurentai: Ōbu Shutsugeki (蒼穹紅蓮隊 黄武出撃). This version features a Special Mode which adds a fourth playable ship and a new final stage, as well as animated opening and ending videos and a voiced navigator. It supports the analog controls of the DualShock controller. The PlayStation version was reissued in May 2003 by Hamster as part of their MajorWave budget label.

Soukyu Gurentai was ported to Japanese feature phones in 2005 and was available for EZWeb, i-mode and Yahoo! Keitai devices.

== Reception ==
In Japan, Game Machine listed Terra Diver on their October 15, 1996 issue as being the fifth most popular arcade software for that two-week period among operators surveyed. Sōkyū Gurentai was one of Raizing's most popular arcade games. Consoles + rated the Sega Saturn version at 92%.

Next Generation reviewed the Saturn version of the game, rating it three stars out of five, and stated that "Good, mindless fun, but not much else. For Saturn owners who lament Raystorm's absence, Soukyu Gurentai is a great, possibly even better, alternative."
