= Tomoyuki Kotani =

Tomoyuki Kotani (小谷 智之, Kotani Tomoyuki), also known as styleos, is a Japanese video game illustrator and character designer. He has credits for games by Psikyo, SNK, and CAVE. During his time at SNK he designed several new characters for The King of Fighters series, including K', Maxima, and Angel.

== Published works ==
- The Fallen Angels (video game) (1998)
- The King of Fighters '99 (1999)
- The King of Fighters 2000 (2000)
- The King of Fighters 2001 (2001)
- Mushihimesama (2004)
- Ibara (2005)
- Pink Sweets: Ibara Sorekara (2006)
