= Battle Bakraid =

1999 video game

- Developer: 8ing/Raizing
- Publisher: Able Corporation
- Programmers: Shinobu Yagawa; Tatsuya Uemura
- Artist: Nanpei Kaneko
- Composer: Atsuhiro Motoyama
- Platform: Arcade
- Release: JP: April 1999
- Genre: Vertically scrolling shooter
- Modes: Single-player, multiplayer
- Arcade system: Toaplan Version 2

Battle Bakraid (Note: Japanese: バトルバクレイド, Hepburn: Batoru Bakureido) is a vertical scrolling shoot 'em up arcade game by Eighting released in 1999. It is the spiritual successor (sometimes incorrectly thought of as a sequel) to the 1996 arcade game Battle Garegga. Players control one of nine fighter jets and shoot enemies, collect power-ups, and defeat bosses to advance through the game.

In 2022, the game was included as part of the Sega Astro City Mini V, a vertically oriented variant of the Sega Astro City mini console, marking its first appearance outside the arcades.

== Gameplay ==
Gameplay screenshot

=== Stages ===
- Training: There are less enemies and bullets, and player's fighter automatically uses a bomb when being hit. The game ends after four stages.
- Normal: A course of medium difficulty with six stages.
- Advance: A course with eight stages, with increased enemy firing rate and bullet density.
- Special/Only Boss: When selected without specifying stage or boss, player plays a course consists of all the boss segments of all stages. When specifying a stage or boss (by pressing left or right), player plays a course consists of the selected stage or boss twice, with second trial featuring increased difficulty. Special can be unlocked either by entering code a special code at the title screen or clearing the Advance game, but clearing Advance game does not unlock the Special course permanently.

After choosing Normal or Advance course, Stage Edit mode allows player to choose the sequence of stages 2–5 from a set of four stages.

In Special/Only Boss mode, an additional Stage I is included, which consists of mid-boss battle in Cloud stage (Stage 6).

=== Fighters ===
There are initially four fighters, with extra fighters available by using unlock codes (up to nine fighters). Pressing different buttons when choosing a fighter can alter a fighter's ability:

- Main shot power type: Press A button
- Bomber power type: Press B button
- Side shot power type: Press C button
- Speed up type: Press Start button

When using Team Edit, player can choose different fighters for successive lives after the initial fighter is destroyed. If Team Edit is unavailable, it can be unlocked by inserting a coin and press Up, Down, Up, Down Left, Right, Left, Right, A, B, Start before timer passes 10.

Fighter's rapid fire rate can be increased by holding C then press A when inside a stage, or decreased by holding C then press B when inside a stage.

- Sky Dragon
- Saber Tiger
- Lightning Wolf
- Hammer Shark

==== Phase 2 fighters ====
- Flame Viper
- Steel Bat
- Solid Ray

==== Phase 3 fighters ====
- Buster Lizard
- Blade Owl

=== Medal system ===
Some enemies drop medals when destroyed. In addition, medal can also be found in neutral background objects when destroyed. The medal initially worth 100 points, but the value increases when player collects all on-screen medals without missing any before another medal is revealed, up to 10000 points. When a medal is missed, the next revealed medal is worth 100 points. If there are multiple on-screen medals, player can restore medal level after missing a medal by collecting the remaining highest value medal on-screen without missing further medals, before revealing any other medal.

=== Multiplier system ===
Whenever a player's fighter destroys a large enemy, a score multiplier is set. The multiplier doubles every time a large enemy is destroyed before timer reaches 0, for up to 64. The multiplier timer increases whenever a large enemy is destroyed. When multiplier is in effect and the player's medal level is already at 10,000 points, revealing medal causes 100,000-point medal to appear instead. When multiplier timer reaches 0, the score multiplier effect simply disappears.

=== Rank ===
Battle Bakraid features a dynamically adjusting rank system that makes the game harder, similar to the rank system in Armed Police Batrider and Battle Garegga. The rank increases when the player collects items, fires its weapons, or uses its bombs. The rank will only decrease when the player grazes bullets or loses lives. In Bakraid, it is easier to graze bullets and survive than in Batrider since the player sprites are larger in comparison to their hitbox.

Bakraid has a fixed moderate starting rate at the beginning of the game compared to the high starting rank of Batrider and the minimum starting rank of Battle Garegga. The players can suicide or graze bullets to decrease the rank for the game.

As rank increases, more bullets spawn, some bullets move faster, attack patterns are generally trickier to negotiate, and enemies gain health.

== Story ==
Randa is a capitalist nation known for aircraft manufacturing, drawing engineers specializing in aerodynamics, artillery, and structural design from around the world. After interest in the industry declined, the Bakraid air show was created to demonstrate the fighters' capabilities outside of simulations.

Around the time of the seventh Bakraid, a nearby nation, Deneb, had attained an expansionist attitude, forcibly subjugating and annexing several of its neighbors with the assistance of the Shtarterra Security Council. Recently, Deneb has asked to participate in Bakraid. Randa's defense council, perfectly aware that this is just a pretext for Deneb to get its and the SSC's engines of war into Randan borders and more easily prosecute their war from there, give their blessing. However, the council secretly contacts the other Bakraid participants, offering even more prize money than normal if they will perform in a special version of Bakraid—genuine war conditions.

== Development ==
Battle Bakraid served as the last work of Shinobu Yagawa at Raizing, before leaving the company after development was completed to join Cave and work alongside Tsuneki Ikeda on projects such as Ibara and Muchi Muchi Pork!.

== Release ==
Battle Bakraid was included in Astro City Mini V in 2022.

== Reception ==
In Japan, Game Machine listed Battle Bakraid in their June 1, 1999 issue as being the tenth most-successful arcade game of the month.
