= Bloody Roar =

Video game series

- Logo from the first game
- Genre: Fighting
- Developers: Eighting; Hudson Soft
- Publishers: Activision; Hudson Soft; Konami; SCEA; Virgin Interactive
- Creators: Kenji Fukuya; Susumu Hibi
- Platforms: Arcade; GameCube; PlayStation; PlayStation 2; Xbox
- First release: Bloody Roar; July 7, 1997
- Latest release: Bloody Roar 4 November 11, 2003

Bloody Roar (Note: Japanese: ブラッディロア, Hepburn: Buraddi Roa) is a series of 3D fighting games developed by Eighting (initially as Raizing) and primarily published by Hudson Soft, centering on characters known as "zoanthropes" who possess the ability to transform into anthropomorphic beasts during combat to unleash enhanced attacks and abilities. The franchise began with the original Bloody Roar (known as Beastorizer in arcades), released in Japanese arcades in 1997 and subsequently ported to the PlayStation. The property is currently owned by Konami following their 2012 merger with Hudson Soft.

== Games ==
Game	Details
Bloody Roar Original release dates: JP: July 7, 1997; NA: October 31, 1997; EU: March 1998	Release years by system: 1997 – Arcade, PlayStation; 2008 – PlayStation Network
Bloody Roar Original release dates: JP: July 7, 1997; NA: October 31, 1997; EU: March 1998	Notes: Released as Beastorizer in North American arcades.; Released as Bloody Roar: Hyper Beast Duel in Japan and Europe.; Re-released as a PS one Classic in 2008 in Japan and 2009 in North America.
Bloody Roar 2 Original release dates: JP: 1998; NA: April 30, 1999; EU: July 1999	Release years by system: 1998 – Arcade; 1999 – PlayStation; 2010 – PlayStation Network
Bloody Roar 2 Original release dates: JP: 1998; NA: April 30, 1999; EU: July 1999	Notes: Released as Bloody Roar 2: Bringer of the New Age in Japan and Europe.; Released as Bloody Roar II: The New Breed in North America.; Released as a PS one Classic in 2010 in North America.
Bloody Roar 3 Original release dates: JP: December 2000; NA: June 25, 2001; EU: August 24, 2001	Release years by system: 2000 – Arcade; 2001 – PlayStation 2
Bloody Roar Extreme Original release dates: NA: March 19, 2002; JP: April 25, 2002; EU: May 3, 2002	Release years by system: 2002 – GameCube; 2003 – Xbox
Bloody Roar Extreme Original release dates: NA: March 19, 2002; JP: April 25, 2002; EU: May 3, 2002	Notes: North American GameCube version released as Bloody Roar: Primal Fury.
Bloody Roar 4 Original release dates: NA: November 11, 2003; EU: November 28, 2003; JP: May 27, 2004	Release years by system: 2003 – PlayStation 2
Bloody Roar 4 Original release dates: NA: November 11, 2003; EU: November 28, 2003; JP: May 27, 2004	Notes: The final game in the series.

== Gameplay ==
Bloody Roar is a 3D fighting game series in the same vein as Dead or Alive, Soulcalibur, Tekken, and Virtua Fighter. The controls are largely consistent throughout the series: a button each for both punch and kick, a beast (transform/attack) button, and a fourth button that has been either a throw button, a block button, an evade button (introduced for some characters in Bloody Roar 4), or a rave button (an early version of Hyper Beast form in the original Bloody Roar only).

Characters in Bloody Roar have standard moves and command moves. Standard moves are combination style moves from fighting games such as Tekken, where the player must press different buttons to create "combos", sometimes pressing the directional pad in one of eight directions at the same time. Command moves are special moves that require a rolling technique with the directional pad while inputting certain commands, like Street Fighter. Each character has fourteen "suggested" combination techniques listed in the manuals for each game, most of these can vary in many different ways, allowing around forty to seventy combination techniques with each character. Every character also has at least eight command moves, which can be incorporated into cancel points for standard moves or combos. There are around twenty to forty cancel points in each character's combo palette. These cancel points, when utilized with command moves, can then be cancelled once more, allowing the player to begin a new strategy with adequate timing. As well as this, the combat system has two types of dodging techniques: a heavy and light block that spans over three parts of the body, instead of the typical two in most fighting games; and "Scratch" techniques, which can break guards from dead angles and is a series of command counters, throws, and vanishing attacks. Although some characters have remained mostly identical throughout all five games, others have changed vastly. For example, Yūgo has a new moveset with many different moves in Extreme/Primal Fury and 4 compared to his original in previous games, but Bakuryū has stayed almost the same apart from a few extra moves which are relevant to the games' evolution over time. Bloody Roar 4, the latest game in the series, may be the most complex one with the largest fighter roster of eighteen characters, and the ability to earn more moves by earning experience in "Career Mode".

== Characters ==
Playable characters in the Bloody Roar series
Character	Beast Form	1	2	3	Extreme	4
Alice Tsukagami	Rabbit	Yes	Yes	Yes	Yes	Yes
Bakuryū (Ryūzō Katō)	Mole	Yes	No	No	No	No
Alan Gado	Lion	Yes	Yes	Yes	Yes	Yes
Gregory Jones	Gorilla	Yes	No	No	No	No
Hans Taubemann	Fox	Yes	No	No	No	No
Jin Long	Tiger	Yes	Yes	Yes	Yes	Yes
Mitsuko Nonomura	Boar	Yes	No	No	No	No
Uriko Nonomura	Half Beast (Cat)	Non-playable boss	Yes	Yes	Yes	Yes
Yūgo Ōgami	Wolf	Yes	Yes	Yes	Yes	Yes
Bakuryū (Kenji Ōgami)	Mole	No	Yes	Yes	Yes	Yes
Hajime Busuzima	Chameleon	No	Yes	Yes	Yes	Yes
Jenny Burtory	Bat	No	Yes	Yes	Yes	Yes
Shenlong	Tiger	No	Yes	Yes	Yes	Yes
Marvel/Shina (Jeanne Gado)	Leopard	No	Yes	Yes	Yes	Yes
Stun (Steven Goldberg)	Insect (Beetle)	No	Yes	Yes	Yes	Yes
Kohryū	Iron Mole	No	No	Yes	Yes	Yes
Uranus	Chimera	No	No	Yes	Yes	Yes
Xion	Unborn	No	No	Yes	Yes	Yes
Cronos Orma	Penguin/Phoenix	No	No	No	Yes	No
Fang (Yūga Tsukigami)	Wolf	No	No	No	Yes (Note: Not playable in the North American GameCube release)	No
Ganesha (Golan Draphan)	Elephant	No	No	No	Yes	No
Mana Kamishiro	Nine Tails	No	No	No	No	Yes (Note: Ryōhō has two different playable incarnations: one in which he fights on his own, and one in which Mana serves as his Zoanthrope transformation)
Nagi Kirishima	Spurious	No	No	No	No	Yes
Reiji Takigawa	Crow	No	No	No	No	Yes
Ryōhō (Raō Mamurasaki)	Dragon	No	No	No	No	Yes
Total		8	11	14	17*	18

== Other media ==
Bloody Roar was adapted into a manga drawn and written by Maruyama Tomowo. It was originally published in Monthly Shōnen Jump. A few themes were used from the games, but the scenarios and characters in Maruyama's version were completely new, although a few of his characters looked similar to the characters from the games. The main stars of the manga were a lone wolf zoanthrope named Fang and a rabbit girl zoanthrope named Mashiro. Their adventures had them fighting out-of-control zoanthropes and trying to stop an evil creature from being released by a gathering of talismans. The manga was released in two volumes during 2001.

Concept artwork and illustrations for the first three games were drawn by artist Naochika Morishita (known under the pseudonym CARAMEL MAMA), and he also created the art used for the in-game cutscenes in 2 and 3.

For their 2000 single "My Console", the Italian eurodance group Eiffel 65 included Bloody Roar along with several other popular PlayStation titles in the song's lyrics.

Yūgo appears as a playable character in the 2003 crossover fighting game DreamMix TV World Fighters.
