= Amazing Nurse Nanako =

1999 original video animation

- Cover of the episode "The First Spiral" as released by Pioneer

菜々子解体診書 (Nanako Kaitai Shinsho)
- Genre: Science fiction; Sex comedy
- Original video animation
- Directed by: Yasuhiro Kuroda
- Produced by: Yasuyuki Ueda; Nobuhiro Ōsawa
- Written by: Rasputin Yano
- Music by: Takayuki Negishi
- Studio: RADIX
- Licensed by: NA: Pioneer Entertainment (2000-2007) Media Blasters (2025-present)
- Released: 5 July 1999 – 7 April 2000
- Episodes: 6

Amazing Nurse Nanako (菜々子解体診書, Nanako Kaitai Shinsho) is an anime OVA series released in Japan. There were 6 episodes. It was released between July 2000 and January 2001 on 3 DVDs in the United States through Geneon, each containing 2 episodes per volume. Following the closure of Geneon USA, Media Blasters acquired the license and will release the series on Blu-ray in 2025.

The series details the life and history of Nanako Shichigusa, a 16-year-old who works as a maid (not nurse as the title might imply) in the hospital of Dr. Kyoji Ogami, the male lead. Nanako is a classic ditzy slapstick protagonist who tends to accidentally break things and do everything wrong. Ogami treats her frequently in a cruel or heartless manner—threatening her, yelling at her and even subjecting her to physical abuse—yet at the climax of every episode he comes through to rescue her from whatever predicament she got herself into. Much of the series revolves around the relationship between Nanako and Ogami—his mean veneer, her faith in him, and how he alternates between the evil mad scientist archetype and the knight in shining armor archetype.

As the series progresses we are gradually revealed the history between Nanako and Ogami's family and given a reason why the two are so tightly knit together, as well as why the title refers to Nanako as a "nurse". A minor supporting cast is introduced, though Nanako and Ogami are clearly the leads. The plot incorporates the American military, the Catholic Church and outlandish science fiction experiments, with these elements progressed mostly in the lead episode and the last two episodes. The middle episodes 2–4 feature mostly unrelated one-shot plots, though minor progress is made in each episode regarding the history between Nanako and Ogami's family.

== Plot summary ==
In the beginning, Nanako was the subject of a cyborg experiment conducted by Dr. Ogami for one of his most powerful robots. Through rigorous training, Dr. Ogami trained Nanako to withstand the pain. However, he made her too strong, and the plan ultimately failed. However, recent developments between the Pentagon and the Vatican to resurrect Jesus for the Second Coming have landed Nanako as the subject of an operation in which she will give birth to the new Jesus.

Throughout the series, we learn that Nanako is, in fact, the third clone in a series of clones cloned from the original Nanako. The original died from a mysterious illness, and an experiment to clone her was successful. However, around the age of 20, each Nanako clone dies of the same mysterious illness that claimed the life of the first Nanako. It has been Dr. Ogami's quest to cure the "Nanako illness" ever since he promised the second clone that he would heal her before she died when he was young.

== Episode 1: The First Spiral ==
Nanako is doing her usual chore of cooking, but the fish she cooks burns and, before that, breaks a dozen plates that were handed down through the Ogami family, which later makes Dr. Ogami angry at her. This is typical of Dr. Ogami, as Nanako does get into a lot of trouble. She gets mixed up in a fight between Kuron and Komanechi, two old people who reside in the hospital.

After running out for a few groceries, she returns to meet Dr. Ogami and the Army. They are conducting an experiment, but she is doing her usual exercises that Dr. Ogami has planned for her. After she finishes, she returns to the experiment, just as it goes haywire. The experiment kills a few officers, and Nanako is sucked into the goo-like monster. She has also caught a cold, so the flu virus helps to weaken the monster as she continuously sneezes. Dr. Ogami rescues Nanako and defeats the monster. The monster freezes and falls apart, ending the disaster.

== Episode 2: Memories of You ==
Nanako runs through tough training exercises, such as standing under a cold waterfall with nothing but a bikini on, with the help of Genki. Nanako, however, believes she is on vacation. While standing by the fire at night, Nanako cooks fishes. However, when she gives Dr. Ogami one, he gets angry because she forgot to buy daikon radish, which helps the protein in fish digest properly. Nanako gets frustrated, and runs away.

While in the woods, she encounters a giant bear after trying to light a fire, and Dr. Ogami reminisces about past Nanakos in the trailer. Nanako runs from the bear in fear as it chases her, losing her skirt in the process leaving her in her tank top and panties. Dr. Ogami realizes she is missing and then begins to read a signal coming from a stuffed animal he had given to her. He locates her and saves her from plunging off a cliff. Genki stops the bear from mauling her to death. Nanako, while hanging from Dr. Ogami's hand, which has a hold of her foot, begs for forgiveness, but Dr. Ogami drops her into the river below as punishment. However, Nanako catches a cold and relaxes naked in a hot tub above a fire Kuron built. Dr. Ogami appears with the stuffed animal that had thought by Nanako to have been dropped off the cliff when she was rescued, but, not only is it a tracking device, it is also a recorder. It plays back something Nanako had said about Dr. Ogami behind his back. Dr. Ogami gets angry and Nanako freaks, jumping out of the tub naked and running for her life. Dr. Ogami chases after her with a beating stick experiment.

== Episode 3: The Psycho Patient ==
Dr. Ogami now has to deal with a patient who has a violent record. He is trying to solve a murder mystery for the police. He performs tests on him, while Kaoru Satsuki teases him. This causes him to become nervous. He also constantly stares as Nanako, as if she is of importance to him. He turns into a "Hyde" monster and wreaks havoc on the Ogami Hospital.

Many attempts of falsely torturing Nanako, including stripped her down to only her panties and being tortured by Kuron, hanging her above a boiling pot of goo, topless with only nipple shields to cover her big breasts in a torture ritual, and a near-lesbian scene where Satsuki tries to "make her into a real woman," all fail. They attempt to shoot tranquilizers into the monster to stop it, but all fail, and, in turn, make everyone else except Dr. Ogami go to sleep. While cornered outside in the rain by the monster, Nanako is saved by Dr. Ogami, who manages to put it to sleep.

The next day, Nanako goes over to Satsuki's room, hoping to ask her about "making her a real woman", but not the way Nanako thought. However, Nanako caught Satsuki at a bad moment... without her makeup on!

== Episode 4: Fire-Crackers ==
In her sleep, Nanako is fitted with a special suit which enables her to be a war machine. She can fly, shoot rockets, and fire bullets with the suit. She awakes to find herself in an exhibit showcasing the suit she is wearing.

During her display, in which only Satsuki can control, she is stopped by a robot named Griffin Mk. II, which also destroys tanks and people in the process. Inside, a man named Alan Mizuki claims she is a cyborg named Nana-Go, which was shown to him by Dr. Ogami in their early days in college together. The once-friend of Dr. Ogami has now become his biggest rival, after sabotaging an attempt to revive one of his loves, Jamie. Nanako pleads that she is not a cyborg, but a human. Mizuki refuses to listen, and still believes she is a cyborg, because she cannot take the suit off.

Griffin Mk. II is then released on her in combat, and eventually destroys half of the hospital. However, Mizuki drops the remote that controls Griffin Mk. II, and that actives a mode which attacks anything that moves. While frozen, they try to figure out a way to retrieve the remote. When a rock falls from the ceiling, Griffin Mk. II attacks it, giving them time to dash to the remote. Yet, their plans are foiled when a rock falls upon the remote and Griffin Mk. II destroys it, destroying the remote also. It goes haywire and fires at everything in sight. Nanako is caught in the middle, and is forced to defeat the robot. She picks the robot up and throws it into the distance, defeating it, but also setting off a self-destruct sequence. It explodes, destroying Ogami Hospital.

Outside, in plain view of the wreckage, Nanako soon realizes her suit is running low on battery power. The suit soon falls apart, revealing her completely naked to Mizuki, proving to him she is not a cyborg. She realizes what happened and covers herself. Mizuki is then carried away by authorities, but Jamie rescues him on the way to jail by self-destructing herself. At the end, Dr. Ogami returns from seeing his father to see that the hospital is in ruins.

== Episode 5: The Last Spiral, Part 1 ==
Another attempt to revive Jesus fails. Nanako and Dr. Ogami steal a plane, but Nanako, once again, believes she is going on vacation. The operation to begin the revival of the second Jesus is beginning, and she is on her way there. The government is about to find out Nanako's secret, and almost find out by going to what remains of the hospital. However, they are saved by a task force. The people who lived in the hospital are the ones who figures out that Nanako is a clone.

While in the air, a "hijacker" tries to stop them, but fails, mostly because the plane is attacked by fighter jets. In the process, an engine aboard the plane explodes after being hit from one of the jets, making flight almost impossible. So, Nanako is ordered to remove all that she can from within the plane. It fails, and she also, in vain, removes a few articles of her clothing to also help, leaving her in bra, panties, garters and stockings. Yet, Dr. Ogami and Nanako exit the plane, and at the very end, Nanako's bra falls off and into the air.

== Episode 6: The Last Spiral, Part 2 ==
Nanako and Dr. Ogami float to safety, and so begins the operation. They strip Nanako down and tie her up to begin the procedure. Dr. Ogami participates, but is really there to sabotage the entire experiment (not to mention cure Nanako). Before putting her under, Dr. Ogami tells Nanako that he called the Army to rescue them.

After the first step in the experiment is completed, the Army and Air Force arrives to destroy the area, and the experiment is a complete failure. Another monster goes berserk and starts killing people left and right, including the head of the experiment, Griffith. Saint, however, escapes with the information about the experiment, hoping to sell it to the highest bidder. Dr. Ogami and Nanako escape into a river and wind up near a waterfall. Dr. Ogami dreams of the past Nanako and himself falling in love, and the past Nanako encourages him. Nanako and Dr. Ogami are eventually saved by the rest of the gang.

However, after returning to the base, it is revealed that Dr. Ogami was to be assigned to SkyLab 5, the newest orbital space station. Realizing that the assignment was really a means to hide him, Dr. Ogami refuses, stating that he will not work anywhere that doesn't have fish. After the Army offers to send up as much fish as he wants, Dr. Ogami adds that he prefers grated radish on his fish. After the Army agreed to this request, Dr. Ogami finally stipulated that only one person is allowed to grill the fish and grate the radish... Nanako! When she realized what Dr. Ogami meant, Nanako groaned in discouragement. The credits reveal that the hospital crew joined Nanako and Dr. Ogami to train and work at SkyLab 5.

== Reception ==
On Anime News Network, Mike Crandol gave it an overall grade of D+.

Writing in the third edition of The Anime Encyclopedia (2015), Jonathan Clements and Helen McCarthy characterized Amazing Nurse Nanako as an unusual combination of the technological thrillers of the 1980s and the romantic comedies of the 1990s aimed at geek audiences. They identified the opening sequence as a pastiche of the computer graphics in Ghost in the Shell and described the contrast between Nanako's mundane concerns and the violent conspiracy surrounding her as "a saucy if puerile antidote" to the serious tone of Neon Genesis Evangelion and its imitators. They also drew a parallel with All Purpose Cultural Cat Girl Nuku Nuku, noting that while the latter involved transplanting an animal brain into a girl's body, Amazing Nurse Nanako reversed the premise by involving an attempt to remove the heroine's brain.
