= Ghost Talker's Daydream =

Japanese manga series and its adaptation

- DVD Cover art for Volume 1 released by Geneon

低俗霊DAYDREAM (Teizokurei Daydream)
- Genre: Horror
- Manga
- Written by: Saki Okuse
- Illustrated by: Sankichi Meguro
- Published by: Kadokawa Shoten
- English publisher: NA: Dark Horse Comics
- Magazine: Monthly Shōnen Ace
- Original run: August 2000 – November 2007
- Volumes: 10
- Original video animation
- Directed by: Osamu Sekita
- Music by: Takayuki Negishi
- Studio: Hal Film Maker
- Licensed by: NA: Discotek Media
- Released: June 25, 2004 – December 23, 2004
- Episodes: 4

Ghost Talker's Daydream, known in Japan as Vulgar Ghost Daydream (低俗霊DAYDREAM, Teizokurei Daydream), is a shōnen manga written by Saki Okuse and illustrated by Sankichi Meguro, set in modern Japan. There are 10 volumes in total, and the series was also adapted as a four episode OVA. The English version released by Geneon changed the title to Ghost Talker's Daydream, which is not a direct translation of the formal manga title.

The protagonist is the virgin albino woman Saiki Misaki holding down three jobs, none of which she finds herself particularly happy with; as a dominatrix in a BDSM club, as a writer of a column for a porno magazine, and as a civil servant in the employ of The Livelihood Preservation Group as a necromancer able to perceive and to communicate with ghosts, sometimes allowing them to speak through her with the living. Her government job usually entails exorcism. Misaki considers her shamanic civil service position even more tawdry and less respectable than her sex work.

Subplots are usually one or two chapters in length and tend to involve the introduction of new characters to help develop the motivations of the leads.

There are three major characters, at least one of whom appears in every chapter with the exception of chapter 16 "Dead Man's Hand." In order of introduction they are: Saiki Misaki, Mitsuru and Souichirou. Various recurring and often important characters also populate the series.

Fan service, nudity and sexual themes are all integral to motivation and backstory, along with insight into Japanese suicide culture and sexual dysfunction with sexual and physical abuse, such carnal troubles of the soul from which even death may guarantee no release.

The Japanese title translates as teizoku = vulgar + rei = ghost. However, there is a pun on the word rei, which can also refer to a companion. In other words, it can be said either Vulgar Ghost or Vulgar Companion, for Misaki Saiki is indeed a vulgar companion in contending with vulgar apparitions.

== Characters ==
- Saiki Misaki: Voiced by: Masumi Asano (Japanese); Karen Thompson (English) Misaki is an albino woman with the distinctive lack of pigmentation that accompanies that condition. Her pink eyes and white hair are also accompanied by a complete lack of pubic hair which causes her some embarrassment. These attributes together put her in high demand for her line of work as a professional Dominatrix for the Roppongi Myure Mule S&M club and contributor to the porno magazine Honey Chop. Misaki is also a necromancer able to see, hear, and speak to ghosts, a talent of which she is most self-deprecating, despite extreme proficiency in both vocations. And Misaki's background and character is even further complicated by her somewhat incongruous virginity.
- Kadotake Souichirou: Voiced by: Tomokazu Sugita (Japanese); Sam Riegel (English) Misaki's partner within and regular liaison to the Livelihood Preservation Group. He is excitable and fascinated by Misaki's erotic vocation. Little does he know, he yearns to be dominated. A proficient martial artist mostly in Judo, Souichirou is still not a master. He has many contacts and proficient at compiling information, but deathly afraid of ghosts which makes him an odd partner for a necromancer.
- Fujiwara Mitsuru: Voiced by: Daisuke Kishio (Japanese); Yuri Lowenthal (English) A high school student still drawn to but wary of domination because of a past relationship with a much older woman, and infatuated with Misaki who rebuffs him as a pest and a stalker. All in all, nevertheless, seemingly a good person, Mitsuru is the son of a Shinto priest to whom he has become somewhat estranged.
- Kunugi Ai: Voiced by: Yukari Tamura (Japanese); Carrie Savage (English) A quiet middle school girl whose sister committed suicide, which Misaki helped her investigate and understand, along with the unintentional death of her niece. Ai is a novice necromancer who looks up to Misaki as her mentor (senpai). Friendly and remarkably brave.
- Kinue: Misaki's mysterious demonic familiar and guardian, taking the form of a rope or cord twisted out from a braid of hair. Misaki often wears him as a garment, and he must occasionally feed off of humans in some unexplained manner.
- Shizue Mikuriya: Voiced by: Kaori Mizuhashi (Japanese); Jennifer Sekiguchi (English) An editor and model at the porno magazine Honey Chop. Openly lesbian and friend to Misaki.
- Saiki Shigeyuki: Misaki's father and the chief administrator of the Livelihood Preservation Group. Divorced from Misaki's mother whose whereabouts are unknown. Somewhat estranged from his daughter.
- Detective Gada: A police detective with unexplained issues relating to necromancy. Has a relationship with the necromancer Isa Haru. Is prone to use somewhat unethical means to achieve his goals.
- Isa Haru: Detective Gada's domestic partner and also a necromancer. Known to be a true hermaphrodite though living as a woman. Seemingly maladjusted and in poor physical health.
- Yujima Hijiri: Mitsuru's middle-aged lover who killed herself who continues to haunt him as a ghost.
- Detective Yamazaki: Voiced by: Tetsuo Kanao (Japanese); Michael McConnohie (English)
- Detective Anzai: Voiced by: Michiko Neya (Japanese); Rita Stephens (English)
- Ichinose: Voiced by: Mai Ito (Japanese); Jennifer Sekiguchi (English)
- Lisa: A very good mahjong player and possible necromancer.
- Funakoshi: Another necromancer employed by the Livelihood Preservation Group.

== Manga ==
No.	Original release date	Original ISBN	English release date	English ISBN
1	02-26-2001	4047133981	07-29-2008	1593079508
Ghost Talker's Daydream is a horror anime created by Saki Okuse and Sankichi Meguro. It tells the story of Misaki Saiki, a young woman with a troubled past, who is a professional dominatrix in one of Tokyo's most exclusive S&M clubs. However, her real money is something she likes even less than being a dominatrix. Ever since childhood, Misaki had the ability to see and communicate with ghosts, and that talent is put to use by the Livelihood Protection Agency, who has Misaki paired with Souichiro Kadotake, a martial-artist who happens to be deathly afraid of ghosts. Using her gifts, Misaki is able to help troubled spirits to resolve what is troubling them and allow them to move on to the afterlife. If all that isn't odd enough, Misaki is an albino and a virgin!
2	07-27-2001	4047134457	11-11-2008	1595821864
Welcome to the sexy, spooky, and suspenseful world of Ghost Talker's Daydream. In the continuing story of Saiki Misaki, the albino dominatrix necromancer, Misaki has to put her wits, looks, and knowledge of ghosts to the test. Follow Misaki as she dodges cops, fights psychos, and exorcises the dead. Fast-paced, smart, and sassy, Ghost Talker's Daydream is everything you loved about the anime and much, much more.
3	04-25-2002	4047134937	01-27-2009	1595822348
After a young lesbian mysteriously dies, her spirit begins to haunt her lover. Who do you call when the ghost of your ex-lover keeps terrorizing you? Saiki Misaki, the albino dominatrix necromancer, of course! The highly sexualized, and eerily suspenseful tale of Ghost Talker's Daydream hits a provocative high point. Follow Saiki as she uses her powers to solve another nail-biting mystery filled with terrifying twists.
4	10-29-2002	4047135127	09-21-2009	1595822607
If having hallucinations is scary, then seeing them at school would be terrifying. But when the hallucinations talk back to you, that's the kind of fright you've come to expect from the world of Ghost Talker's Daydream. Come join Saiki Misaki, the albino dominatrix necromancer, as she jumps head-first into another supernatural mystery. This time around the case becomes more personal, as the power that gives Saiki the ability to see and talk to the dead is the very thing terrorizing her client. Prepare yourself for an anything-but-typical "speaks to ghosts" manga that will blow you away with beautiful and sensual art coupled with a terrifying story. Dark Horse Manga continues to deliver top-notch Japanese horror manga at its finest. From writer Saki Okuse (Twilight of the Dark Master) and artist Sankichi Meguro.
5	05-01-2003	4047135607	02-15-2011	1595826661
Saiki Misaki, our albino dominatrix necromancer hero, can't seem to get away from dead people. Even while on vacation! Far from home, resting at a spa resort, Misaki still seems to be a magnet for tragic stories and creepy scenes. And sometimes the creepy stuff just comes looking for her! In volume five of Ghost Talker's Daydream, Misaki's partner from back home is racing to find her with a few colorful characters in tow, namely the young stalker who's obsessed with Misaki, and a young girl who is also a budding necromancer. The result is a long trip to the world of the dead.
6	07-01-2004	404713645X	06-07-2011	1595827153
Three words: virgin, albino, dominatrix. But wait! One more word: necromancer. Yes, Japan has its fetishes, but not often does one find so many of them packed into one storyline, especially one with good writing. Enter Ghost Talker's Daydream. Suicide never goes on vacation, and our heroine can't seem to get a break, either. Back from a short time away, Misaki gets thrown right back into it, attempting to exorcize a particularly nasty, evil presence from an apartment building, before it kills all the tenants!
7	06-25-2005	4047137308	TBA	—
8	01-26-2006	4047137790	TBA	—
9	09-21-2006	4047138584	TBA	—
10	01-29-2008	404713953X	TBA	—

== Anime ==
Vulgar Ghost Daydream has also been produced as a short run OVA anime of four episodes in 2004. In Japanese, the title is still Teizokurei Daydream, but United States distributor Geneon Animation has re-titled the release Ghost Talker's Daydream. Of the four episodes, two follow the chapters from the manga decently, but the other two have very little relationship to the manga.

=== Episode list ===
No.	Title
1	"Ghost Talker"
Misaki Saiki is preparing for her S&M club job. The events of a mother who apparently killed her daughter Miku and herself are shown. Souichiro Kadotake of the Social Work Division picks up Misaki to deal with ghosts of the woman and her daughter, and then waits in the car outside. Inside the apartment Misaki finds a man about to rape the mother’s younger sister, Ai. Misaki intervenes, and is saved at the last moment by Souichiro, but the killer escapes. They receive some photos of the man escaping taken by Mitsuru Fujiwara who then texts them the man’s location. Misaki learns that the man was Koga, who was living with the woman, Po, and who murdered Miku. Misaki, Souichiro and Ai find Koga and his gang. In the ensuing fight, Koga flees, but Kinue, Misaki's mysterious demonic familiar and guardian, attacks and kills him, freeing the spirits of the mother and daughter. Ai sees Mitsuru leaving and recognises him as a student at her school.
2	"Bindweed"
Misaki gets a message from Souichiro about mysterious phenomena in the Nakano district. Misaki as a child is shown being taken to live with her grandparents. Misaki encounters Ai in the subway who reveals that she can now see ghosts as well. Ai tries to talk to the ghost of a woman on a bridge against Misaki’s advice. Ai follows the ghost who tries to kill her and Mitsuru follows Ai. Souichiro takes Misaki to a house where an old couple and their grandchild disappeared. The house brings back memories of her childhood, and frees the ghost. Just as the ghost woman on the bridge tries to kill Ai, Misaki and Souichiro arrive and save her. Ai says she wants to be like Misaki, but she just tells Mitsuru to take her home.
3	"Mad Bones"
Some children’s bones are found on a construction site. Yamazaki from the local police suggests that it is part of the Matsuda kidnapping incident 12 years ago. While on vacation Misaki encounters a van with the voices of children on a mountain road. Later, a man driving a van along the mountain road is blinded by children's hands on the windscreen and crashes. In Tokyo, Souichiro takes Ai to investigate a ghost sighting without success. At the scene of the van accident, Misaki sees ghosts of children, wanting to play, and is recognised by the Kanagawa police. Later, they question Misaki who admits seeing ghosts of children. Yamazaki tells her that a woman- Ichinose - was charged with abducting children, but no bodies were ever found. After release Ichinose supposedly committed suicide. Misaki agrees to help. At the construction site, she sees the ghosts of the children, but the construction proceeds anyway. Later that night, the construction boss is killed by a crane. Misaki accompanies the police to the site, and says the children did not cause the incident. Suddenly she is possessed by the spirit of Ichinose.
4	"Water Spirit"
Souichiro is booked for speeding in his rush to find Misaki. Ai sees the ghosts of the children, and finds a ring attached to a necklace. As they start to drive back to Tokyo, Ai sees Fujiwara, who takes them to Misaki. Detective Yamazaki takes them all to the house where Ichinose lived with her uncle, a sexual predator, but Ichinose’s spirit is not there. Yamazaki reveals that Ichinose’s father tried to kill them both in the lake when she was a child, but Ichinose survived. Later that night Yamazaki convinces Misaki to try again to contact Ichinose at the house, while wearing the ring attached to the necklace, which belonged to her father. Ichinose possesses her and causes her to attack Yamazaki, and then drive them into the lake. They survive, and Misaki, possessed by Ichinose, reveals that she killed the children to save them from being abused by adults as she was. Misaki pulls Yamazaki from the car, but Ichinose’s ghost sinks with her father’s ring and her spirit is released. With Ichinose gone, the children’s spirits also depart in peace.
