= Takayuki Negishi =

Japanese composer

Takayuki Negishi (根岸貴幸, Negishi Takayuki) (born August 6, 1961) is a Japanese composer, music arranger and record producer originating from Tokyo. Negishi began work as a synthesizer operator in 1983. He worked with IMAGIN, so he often arranged songs with Kohei Tanaka.

== Compositions ==
=== Animation ===
- Hyper Doll (1995, Pioneer LDC)
- Lupin the 3rd: The Secret of Twilight Gemini (1996, Kyokuichi Tokyo Movie)
- Cardcaptor Sakura (1998, NHK)
- Amazing Nurse Nanako (1999, Pioneer LDC)
- Tokyo Mew Mew (2002, TV Tokyo)
- Crash Gear Nitro (2003, TV Asahi)
- The World of Narue (2003, Mainichi Broadcasting System)
- F-Zero: Falcon Densetsu (2003, TV Tokyo)
- Wagamama Fairy: Mirumo de Pon! Wandabo (2004, TV Tokyo)
- Ghost Talker's Daydream (2004, Bandai Visual)
- Strawberry 100% (2005, TV Asahi)
- Cluster Edge (2005, TV Tokyo)
- Tokyo Majin (2007, Animax)
- Bakugan Battle Brawlers (2007, TV Tokyo)
- Mnemosyne (2008, AT-X)
- Bakugan Battle Brawlers: New Vestroia (2010, TV Tokyo)
- Cardfight!! Vanguard (2011, TV Tokyo)
- Bakugan Battle Brawlers: Gundalian Invaders (2011, TV Tokyo)
- Cardfight!! Vanguard: Asia Circuit (2012, TV Tokyo)
- Cardfight!! Vanguard: Link Joker (2013, TV Tokyo)
- Gaist Crusher (with Kohei Tanaka) (2013, TV Tokyo)
- Cardfight!! Vanguard: Legion Mate Chapter (2014, TV Tokyo)
- Cardcaptor Sakura: Clear Card (2018, NHK)

=== Radio drama ===
- Yamada Taro Monogatari (2001, Tokyo FM)
- Troubleshooter Sheriffstars SS (2001, Tokyo FM)
- Ghost Talker's Daydream (2001, Tokyo FM)
- Trinity Blood: Rage Against the Moons (2001, Tokyo FM)
- The World of Narue (2002, Tokyo FM)
- 7 Seeds (2003, Tokyo FM)
- Angel Game (2003, Tokyo FM)

=== Video games ===
- Bloody Roar (1997, Hudson Soft)
- Hashi no Oka Gakuen Monogatari: Gakuen Sai (1998, MediaWorks)
- Bloody Roar 2 (1999, Hudson Soft)
- Sunrise Eiyuutan (1999, Dreamcast, Sunrise)
- Bloody Roar 3 (2000, Hudson Soft)

=== Television drama ===
- Kotobuki Wars (2004, CBC TV / Tokyo Broadcasting System Television)
- Western Police Special (2004, TV Asahi)
- Bishojo Celebrity Panchanne (2007, TV Tokyo)

=== Film ===
- Lupin III: Dead or Alive (1996, Toho & Kyokuichi Tokyo Movie)
- Partners (2010, Tokyo Theatres)

== Arrangements ==
- Mami Kingetsu - "Kyoe te Mr. Sky", "Yume wo Dakishimeru Teite", "SHOW TIME"
- Mariko Nagai - Jokigen (1987), Genkyoho (1988), Tobikkiri (1988), Daisuki (1989), Miracle Girl (1989), Catch Ball (1990)
- Hitomi Mieno - Ki Ra Ri Pi Ka Ri (1995), All Weather Girl (1995)
- Yuko Imai - Disclose (1994)
- Hiroko Moriguchi - Still Love You (1989, 4 tracks), Prime Privacy (1989, 8 tracks)
- Yumiko Takahashi - "Egao no Maho"
- Natsuki Okamoto - "Suru No? Shinai No"
- Miho Nakayama - "Switch On"
- Maki Mochida - "Kitto..."
- Tomo Sakurai - "Boken no Kazu Dake"
- Wu Rujun - "Niji"
