= F-117 Night Storm =

1993 video game

- North American cover art
- Developer: Electronic Arts
- Publishers: WW: Electronic Arts; JP: Electronic Arts Victor
- Designer: Michael Kosaka
- Composer: David Whittaker
- Platform: Sega Genesis
- Release: WW: December 1993; JP: 27 May 1994
- Genre: Flight simulation
- Mode: Single-player

F-117 Night Storm is a Sega Genesis-exclusive video game that was released in 1993 by Electronic Arts.

== Gameplay ==
While dogfighting, players are advised to steer clear around surface-to-air missile launches; like the Soviet-made SA-11 Gadfly shown below.

The player pilots a Lockheed F-117 Nighthawk. There are two modes: arcade mode and campaign mode. Arcade mode allows players to pick and choose every aspect of the mission, while campaign mode is basically a career in the United States Air Force. From training missions in the deserts of Nevada (during the player's original enlistment period in 1982) to tours of duty in Panama (of the 1980s) and the Gulf War (lasting from 1990 to 1991), each mission has a primary objective that must be completed before moving on.

Players are given the option to equip from seven different weapons; including Sidewinder missiles. Digitized speech is included in this game. During the era of this video game's release, it was considered to be the most realistic combat flight simulator available for the general public. Cinema-like insets are used for dramatic storytelling during cutscenes. Laser targeting is used on the player's aircraft, along with infrared displays of enemy aircraft and other targets.

== Reception ==
Electronic Gaming Monthly gave F-117A Night Storm a score of 5.6 out of 10. They praised the game's concept, cinemas, and level designs, but said the choppiness of the flying and combat was "a fatal flaw".
