= J-League Winning Goal =

1994 video game

- Cover art (Game Boy)
- Developer: Graphic Research
- Publisher: Electronic Arts Victor
- Platforms: Game Boy; Family Computer
- Release: 1994
- Genre: Sports (soccer/football)
- Mode: Single-player or multiplayer

J-League Winning Goal (Jリーグ ウィニングゴール, J-Rīgu Uiningu Gōru) is a soccer game released for the Game Boy and Family Computer that revolves around the J-League.

The game's objective is to win the championship so that the player's chosen team can be called the greatest in all of Japan. There is an exhibition, a season mode, a playoff mode, and a practice mode.
