= Bloody Roar 2 =

1999 fighting video game

- Arcade flyer
- Developer: Raizing
- Publishers: JP: Hudson Soft; NA: Sony Computer Entertainment; PAL: Virgin Interactive
- Directors: Kenji Fukuya; Susumu Hibi
- Designer: Tetsu Ozaki
- Programmers: Yasunari Watanabe; Yūichi Ochiai
- Artists: Shinichi Ōnishi; Naochika Morishita
- Composers: Arcade; Manabu Namiki; Kenichi Koyano; Masaharu Iwata; Jin Watanabe; PlayStation; Takayuki Negishi
- Series: Bloody Roar
- Platforms: Arcade, PlayStation
- Release: Arcade: JP: September 1998; NA: 1998; PlayStation: JP: January 28, 1999; NA: May 25, 1999; PAL: July 1999
- Genre: Fighting
- Modes: Single-player, multiplayer
- Arcade system: Sony ZN-1

Bloody Roar 2, (Note: Japanese: ブラッディロア2, Hepburn: Buraddi Roa Tsū) known as Bloody Roar 2: Bringer of the New Age in Europe and Japan and as Bloody Roar II: The New Breed in the United States, is a 1998 arcade fighting video game developed by Raizing and published by Hudson Soft. It is the second installment in the Bloody Roar series. A port to the PlayStation home console was released in 1999. It has since been re-released for PlayStation 3, PlayStation Vita and PlayStation Portable via the North American PlayStation Network as of 2021. The game was followed up by Bloody Roar 3 (2000).

== Gameplay ==
Alice (left) versus Busuzima (right), both in beast mode

Just like its predecessor, every character has a beast form that can be used to initiate new attacks, recover some lost health and generally be faster and/or more powerful with their attacks. In addition, the sequel introduces "Beast Drives": super attacks that initiate a cutscene and inflict substantial damage towards the opponent, with each Beast Drive varying in uniqueness depending on the character.

== Plot ==
Five years after the events of the first game, the zoanthropes who had gotten involved in the conflict against the fallen Tyron Corporation have since resumed their normal and peaceful lives. However, the peace does not last long as a new threat emerges. With the revelation of the zoanthropes' existence being made and known full well to the world, tensions and hostilities between humans and zoanthropes start to rise at an alarming and dangerous rate. The conflict gives birth to an organization called the Zoanthrope Liberation Front, or ZLF for short, which espouses zoanthrope supremacy, threatening both humans and non-member zoanthropes alike. Meanwhile, Alan Gado, a figure known for promoting understanding between zoanthropes and humans, becomes a fugitive for an unclear reason. Several rebel zoanthropes are thrown into a battle with the ZLF and Gado with the fate of the world at their hands.

Eventually, it is revealed that the ZLF's supposed "leader", Shenlong, is actually a puppet under the control of Hajime Busuzima, who masquerades as the group's right-hand man. Although he manages to flee, the rebels are able to subdue Shenlong and disband the ZLF. Subsequently, the rebels are tasked by Gado, who became a fugitive merely to escape attention, to band together and create a movement with the aim to achieve peace and reconciliation between the zoanthropes and humans.

== Characters ==
The game features a total of eleven playable characters. Seven are new additions with one is re-introduced from the first game as a regular playable character:

- Bakuryu: A mole zoanthrope and successor to another mole zoanthrope with the same name. A ninja assassin formerly employed by Tylon Corporation as a weapon, he was found by Yugo Ogami during the events of the first game and adopted as his younger brother, being given the name Kenji.
- Uriko Nonomura: A cat zoanthrope half-beast. When she was a little child, she was kidnapped and brainwashed into a prototype Uranus the Chimera by Tylon Corporation, where she served as the first game’s final boss. Although she was freed by her mother, Mitsuko, the experiment conducted on her had produced a weakening side effect, preventing her from turning into a full cat beast form.
- Stun: An insect zoanthrope. As a human named Steven Goldberg, he was employed as a scientist of Tylon Corporation alongside Hajime Busuzima, but quit upon learning that his experiments used live zoanthrope subjects. Subsequently, Busuzima captured and turned him into a "man-made zoanthrope".
- Shina: A leopard zoanthrope. She is Alan Gado's adopted daughter and follows his footsteps in becoming a mercenary.
- Jenny Burtory: A bat zoanthrope and a freelancer.
- Hajime Busuzima: A chameleon zoanthrope. He is a scientist intrigued by the power of zoanthropes.
- Shenlong: A tiger zoanthrope. He is a clone of Long used by Tylon Corporation as a weapon.

The other four are returning characters from the first game:

- Yugo Ogami: A wolf zoanthrope.
- Alice Tsukagami: A rabbit zoanthrope.
- Alan Gado: A lion zoanthrope.
- Jin Long: A tiger zoanthrope.

== Reception ==
Reception

Aggregate score
Aggregator	Score
GameRankings	79%

Review scores
Publication	Score
AllGame	4/5
CNET Gamecenter	6/10
Computer and Video Games	4/5
Edge	6/10
Electronic Gaming Monthly	6/10, 7/10, 7/10, 6/10
EP Daily	6/10
Famitsu	32/40
Game Informer	7/10
GameFan	89%
GameRevolution	C+
GameSpot	6.1/10
IGN	8.8/10
Next Generation	3/5
Official U.S. PlayStation Magazine	4/5
PlayStation: The Official Magazine	4/5
Video Games (DE)	84%

The PlayStation version received mixed reviews from critics, though received a favorable score on the review aggregation website GameRankings based on four notable reviews. Next Generation called it "a visually pretty and fun-to-play fighting game with just enough to set it apart from the rest of the 'me too' titles. Despite the minor balancing issues, there is a whole lot to like." In Japan, Famitsu gave it a score of 32 out of 40. GamePro called it "a welcome addition to any fighter's library." (Note: GamePro gave the PlayStation version two 4.5/5 scores for graphics and control, 4/5 for sound, and a perfect 5/5 for fun factor.)

Douglass C. Perry of IGN said, "What the game lacks in history and originality, it makes up for in a deep combo-laden fighting system, exquisite graphics, and layers of gameplay modes that few games offer." Johnny Liu of GameRevolution called it "a game that you just don't want to spend that much time with. It's fine for a try or two and nothing more. While good enough, Bloody Roar II isn't anywhere near the best. James Mielke of GameSpot said of the Japanese import, "If you never picked up the first game, Bloody Roar 2 is still a good game, with a much better cast than the first one. However, in contrast to the original American version of BR1, Bloody Roar 2 is a marginal improvement that still suffers from second-best status due to the exclusion of integral gameplay elements that should never have been messed with. The game is a major disappointment for such a promising series."

Response to the graphics and design was mostly favorable. Perry noted that the game's high-resolution graphics "sharpen and crystallize the polygonal, textured-mapped characters" and proclaimed that this brought the game "into the top tier of best-looking PlayStation games." He added that the animal designs "are all bizarre, lean toward a Japanese sensibility, and are exquisitely designed, both in their tight programming, and in the level of texture details, shape, and movement." Liu stated that while the game is graphically sharp, "it employs minimal animation outside of the characters." He said that the animal designs "do look pretty good, although the human counterparts could use some work," and compared the appearance of the Stun character's beetle form to "a bulked up Unit 01 robot from the anime Neon Genesis Evangelion". Mielke considered the Japan import to be "as gorgeous as the first installment - in fact, it looks almost exactly the same, with beautiful light-sourcing, speedy 60fps action, and all sorts of special effects when switching into beast mode."

The sound and music was met with mixed response. Perry said that the sound effects were "as good if not better than last year's game," but called the music "truly uninspired" and compared it to "a series of generic riffs extracted straight from the bad heavy metal of the dour mid-'80s." Liu was critical of the voice-acting, noting that "most of these guys sound just sound wrong" and that "the announcer is completely devoid of excitement; instead of getting pumped up for an exciting match, I felt more pumped up to go do something else... anything else." His response to the rest of the audio was more middling, saying that the sound effects are "good, but nothing new" and the music "isn't very impressive -- typical fighter fare, with a few choice selections, funneling down to some bothersome noise." Mielke positively described the voice-overs and sound effects as "really well done".

In its first full month of release, Bloody Roar 2 was the twentieth best-selling home console game in the United States.
