= The Fallen Angels (video game) =

1998 fighting video game

- Japanese candy cabinet marquee of Daraku Tenshi - The Fallen Angels.
- Developer: Steel Hearts
- Publisher: Psikyo
- Designers: Kouzou Fujimoto (producer); Mitsuo Kodama (director)
- Artist: Toshiyuki Kotani
- Composer: Masaki Izutani
- Platform: Arcade
- Release: 1998
- Genre: Fighting
- Modes: Single-player, multiplayer
- Arcade system: Psikyo SH-2

The Fallen Angels (堕落天使, Daraku Tenshi) is a 1998 fighting arcade game developed by Steel Hearts and published by Psikyo. A "complete edition" of the game by Zerodiv (founded by former Psikyo programmer Keiyuki Haragami) was announced in 2019 to be released for arcades and later consoles, but no developments have occurred since.

== Gameplay ==
Fallen Angels is a two dimensional fighting game that takes a somewhat realistic approach in its gameplay, with super powered moves and with fluid movements animated using real motions (which was also featured in Art of Fighting 3). Projectile attacks are limited to three characters, atypical for the game's genre. The game featured eight playable characters: Cool, Harry Ness, Yuiren, Yuiran, Tarō, Torao Onigawara, Ruccio Roche and Haiji Mibu. The boss characters are Trigger and Carlos.

Screenshot of The Fallen Angels

== Plot ==
The game takes place in 2010, ten years after a massive earthquake that shook an unnamed city. The earthquake severed the city from its surrounding areas, leaving criminals to run as they please. The game revolves around the inhabitants fighting against one another to accomplish their goals.

== Development ==
The Fallen Angels was developed on Psikyo's proprietary arcade hardware. The art was produced by Shinichi Morioka, a renowned designer in Japan.

The director, Mitsuo Kodama, later said that he was not satisfied with the quality of The Fallen Angels, for which he felt the short development time and shortage of staff was to blame, but that he had fonder memories of the development than he did of any other video game because of the time he spent with the other people who worked on the game.

== Reception ==
In Japan, Game Machine listed The Fallen Angels on their May 1, 1998 issue as being the eleventh most-successful arcade game among machine operators surveyed during that two-week period.

== See also ==
- List of fighting games
