= Electronic Arts Victor =

Japanese company

- Industry: Video games
- Founded: 1990
- Defunct: December 1997
- Fate: Became Electronic Arts Square
- Successor: Electronic Arts Square
- Headquarters: Japan
- Area served: Japan
- Parent: Electronic Arts (65%); Victor Entertainment (35%)

Electronic Arts Victor Inc. (エレクトロニック・アーツ・ビクター株式会社, Erekutoronikku Ātsu Bikutā Kabushiki-gaisha) was a joint-venture between Electronic Arts and Victor Entertainment. It published various sports games for the Family Computer, Super Famicom, and the Mega Drive. Some other sports concepts include J-League association football, American football, and NHL hockey.

EA Victor has formerly participated in various PC World expos in the 1990s.

== History ==
The company was founded in 1990.

In December 1997, Electronic Arts acquired Victor's 35% stake in the venture. In May 1998, EA signed a similar joint-venture deal with Square to publish EA titles in Japan, called Electronic Arts Square.

VRARA's Japanese branch was established in April 2016 by ex-EA Victor General Manager Ariro Nagayama.

== Organization ==
The company's former HQ was in Jingumae, Shibuya.

== Games developed / published ==
- Battle Garegga
- Cotton: Fantastic Night Dreams
- Warcraft II: Tides of Darkness
- Little Big Adventure
- Fade to Black
- Alone in the Dark 2
- NHL Pro Hockey '94
- F-117 Night Storm
- J-League Winning Goal (J-Rīgu Uiningu Gōru - Jリーグ ウィニングゴール)
- Zico Soccer
- Mutant League Football
- Soukyugurentai
- Ultima Underworld
- Tactical Soccer
- J. League Live 64
- Deadlock: Planetary Conquest (Deddorokku - デッドロック)
- NASCAR 98 (PlayStation)
- Metal Fist
- Super Zugan: Hakotenjou kara no Shoutai
