= Bloody Roar 4 =

2003 fighting video game

- Bloody Roar 4 European cover art
- Developers: Hudson Soft, Eighting
- Publisher: Hudson Soft
- Director: Kenji Fukuya
- Producers: Takayuki Sō; Masato Toyoshima
- Designers: Masaharu Tokutake; Nobuyuki Irie; Shoji Mizumoto; Tetsu Ozaki
- Programmers: Jumpei Isshiki; Yūichi Ochiai
- Artist: Mitsuakira Tatsuta
- Composer: Yoshihiro Tsukahara
- Series: Bloody Roar
- Engine: RenderWare
- Platform: PlayStation 2
- Release: NA: November 11, 2003; PAL: November 28, 2003; JP: May 27, 2004
- Genre: Fighting
- Modes: Single-player, multiplayer

Bloody Roar 4 (Note: Japanese: ブラッディロア4, Hepburn: Buraddi Roa Fō) is a fighting game developed by Eighting and Hudson Soft in 2003. It is the fifth and final of the Bloody Roar games as well as the second game in the series to appear on the PlayStation 2.

== Gameplay ==
Like the previous games in the series, characters can transform into beasts during battle, using the beast gauge, slightly increasing their power. Unlike the other games, however, the beast gauge acts as its own separate health meter.

== Plot ==
After the events of Bloody Roar 3, Xion, who is possessed by the Unborn, an evil spirit, attacks the dragon temple, awakening the dragon. The dragon is a weapon of Gaia, the Earth's will, and is supposed to awaken in the presence of evil. However, if freed too long, it can inadvertently destroy the world itself. The dragon is successfully resealed by the temple's head miko at the cost of her life, leaving the late miko's sister, Mana, to watch over the seal in Ryoho, the temple's priest and the vessel of the dragon. Other than attacking the temple, Xion also stabs a woman named Nagi, imbuing her with his power as well as that of Gaia's, making her both his lifesaver and enemy.

A year later, the dragon is about to break free again, causing disturbances among the zoanthropes triggering earthquakes. Each of the zoanthropes investigate and eventually find the source in the dragon temple. In some cases, Ryoho and Mana invite them to help strengthen the seal, while others come on their own accord. In most of the characters' endings, Mana manages to seal the dragon and Ryoho comes out alive. In Nagi's ending, in addition to sealing the dragon and saving Ryoho, she kills Xion and the Unborn. In Xion's ending, the Unborn is killed, but not before murdering Ryoho and the dragon. In Reiji's ending, the confrontation at the temple ends with him murdering Ryoho and the dragon.

== Characters ==
The game features eighteen playable characters. Four are new additions:

- Nagi Kirishima, the Spurious: A human who becomes entangled with the zoanthrope conflict when Xion stabbed her during his rampage on the dragon temple. The incident not only bequeathed her with Xion's essence, thus branding her his clone, but also the power of Gaia, the Earth's will who opposes Xion.
- Reiji Takigawa, the Crow: A former member of the Yatagarasu, a clan of crow zoanthropes protecting the dragon temple. He went fugitive after killing his father and became a hedonist who messes around zoanthropes for fun.
- Ryoho and Mana: Two guardians of the dragon temple. Ryoho, who real name is Rao Mamurasaki, is a priest who is secretly a vessel for Gaia's dragon, whereas Mana is a young nine-tailed fox tasked to keep the dragon's seal. In gameplay, the two work in tandem, with Mana serving as the zoanthrope transformation.
- Ryoho, the Dragon: The character is Ryoho after he is possessed by the dragon. He is no longer accompanied by Mana and instead has his own zoanthrope transformation. No matter which difficulty the player chooses, Ryoho's dragon form is very difficult to defeat normally without any chance to continue fighting him, and requires tactics to defeat him in Arcade Mode.

The other fourteen return from previous games:

- Yugo Ogami, the Wolf.
- Alice Tsukagami, the Rabbit.
- Alan Gado, the Lion.
- Long Shin, the Tiger.
- Uriko Nonomura, the Cat.
- Kenji Ogami/Bakuryu, the Mole.
- Stun, the Insect.
- Shina, the Leopard.
- Jenny Burtory, the Bat.
- Hajime Busuzima, the Chameleon.
- Shenlong, the Tiger.
- Xion, the Unborn.
- Kohryu, the Iron Mole.
- Uranus, the Chimera.

== Reception ==
Reception

Aggregate score
Aggregator	Score
Metacritic	59/100

Review scores
Publication	Score
Electronic Gaming Monthly	4/10, 3.5/10, 3.5/10
Famitsu	28/40
Game Informer	7.5/10
GameSpot	6.2/10
GameSpy	2/5
GameZone	6/10
IGN	6/10
Official U.S. PlayStation Magazine	1/5
PlayStation: The Official Magazine	6/10
X-Play	3/5

The game received "mixed" reviews according to the review aggregation website Metacritic. In Japan, Famitsu gave it a score of 28 out of 40. GamePro said of the game, "While Bloody Roar 4 might not challenge for the Best Fighting Game crown, it does offer extremulicious [sic] action." (Note: GamePro gave the game two 4/5 scores for graphics and fun factor, and two 3.5/5 scores for sound and control.)
