= Bloody Roar 3 =

2000 video game

- North American PlayStation 2 cover art
- Developer: Eighting
- Publishers: JP: Hudson Soft Namco (arcade); NA: Activision; EU: Virgin Interactive
- Director: Kenji Fukuya
- Producer: Masato Toyoshima
- Programmer: Yūichi Ochiai
- Artists: Shinichi Ōnishi; Naochika Morishita
- Composer: Takayuki Negishi
- Series: Bloody Roar
- Platforms: Arcade, PlayStation 2
- Release: Arcade: JP: December 2000; PlayStation 2: JP: March 1, 2001; NA: June 26, 2001; PAL: August 24, 2001
- Genre: Fighting
- Modes: Single-player, multiplayer
- Arcade system: Namco System 246

Bloody Roar 3 (Note: Japanese: ブラッディロア3, Hepburn: Buraddi Roa Surī) is a 2000 arcade fighting video game developed by Eighting and Hudson Soft. It is the sequel to Bloody Roar 2 (1998). Build on Namco System 246 hardware, it was ported to the PlayStation 2 in 2001, published by Activision in North America and by Virgin Interactive in Europe. Bloody Roar 3 was followed up by Bloody Roar Extreme on other platforms and Bloody Roar 4 on PlayStation 2.

== Gameplay ==
The main feature of Bloody Roar 3 is the ability to transform into beasts, which is involved in all of the Bloody Roar games. Once the character transforms, they regain part of the health they have lost and become much stronger and more powerful than before.

== Characters ==
New characters

- Xion the Unborn — A cold and reserved man who plots to exterminate all other Zoanthropes. His Zoanthrope is the Unborn.
- Kōryū — A relentless machine modeled after the first Bakuryu, Ryūzō Katō. His Zoanthrope is the Iron Mole. (Unlockable)
- Uranus — A perfected clone of Uriko known as the strongest Zoanthrope. Her Zoanthrope is the Chimera. (Unlockable)

Returning characters

- Yugo the Wolf — The W.O.C. leader determined to stop the XGC.
- Alice the Rabbit — A W.O.C. activist who follows Yugo on his search for the XGC mark's origin.
- Long the Tiger — A vagrant on a journey to stop the harmful XGC.
- Gado the Lion — A commissioner willing to create coexistence between humanity and Zoanthropes.
- Kenji/Bakuryu the Mole — A student with the desire to protect his burdened brother, leading him to retake the Bakuryu mantle to redeem himself, and the moniker as well.
- Uriko the Half-Beast — A student who goes to find the XGC to cure her boredom.
- Stun the Insect — A solitary former researcher for Tylon turned a rogue "man-made zoanthrope" with unstable body, encouraged by Jenny to look for the XGC.
- Shina the Leopard — A mercenary adopted daughter of Gado sent to find the source of the XGC.
- Jenny the Bat — A top spy tasked with looking into the chaos of the XGC.
- Busuzima the Chameleon — A former head researcher for Tylon setting out to harness the power of the XGC code.
- Shenlong the Tiger — Long's clone who now lives a completely different life as a bouncer who will kill anyone he does not like, in order to differentiate himself from Long.

== Reception ==
Reception

Aggregate score
Aggregator	Score
Metacritic	71/100

Review scores
Publication	Score
AllGame	3/5
Electronic Gaming Monthly	5.67/10 (Note: In Electronic Gaming Monthly's review of the PlayStation 2 version, two critics gave it each a score of 6/10, and the other gave it 5/10.)
EP Daily	6.5/10
Famitsu	29/40
Game Informer	8/10
GameRevolution	C
GameSpot	5.5/10
GameSpy	80%
IGN	7.9/10
Next Generation	3/5
Official U.S. PlayStation Magazine	3.5/5
Maxim	4.5/5

The PlayStation 2 version received "mixed or average reviews" according to the review aggregation website Metacritic. Michael "Major Mike" Weigrand said, "The PS2 has been barren of 'A' fighting games since launch, and while Bloody Roar 3 is a refreshing change of pace, it doesn't offer anything that wasn't featured in its first two incarnations. Newcomers will be pleased, but for rabid fans, this is a mute Roar." (Note: GamePro gave the PlayStation 2 version two 4.5/5 scores for graphics and control, and two 4/5 scores for sound and fun factor.) Eric Bratcher of NextGen said of the Japanese import, "Hunting for the next king of the jungle in 3D fighters? You won't want to mount this one's head on your wall, but it'll keep you warm and well fed until your next big game hunt." In Japan, Famitsu gave it a score of 29 out of 40.

Also in Japan, Game Machine listed the arcade version in their February 15, 2001 issue as the fifth most-successful arcade game of the past year.
