= Bloody Roar Extreme =

2002 video game

Bloody Roar Extreme/Primal Fury
- North American GameCube cover art
- Developer: Eighting (Note: Ported to Xbox by Konami Software Shanghai)
- Publishers: JP: Hudson Soft; NA/EU: Activision (GC) Konami (Xbox)
- Director: Kenji Fukuya
- Producers: Hiroshi Igari, Masato Toyoshima
- Designer: Tetsu Ozaki
- Composer: Hiromichi Furuya
- Series: Bloody Roar
- Platforms: GameCube, Xbox
- Release: GameCube: NA: March 19, 2002; JP: April 25, 2002; PAL: May 3, 2002; Xbox: NA: May 27, 2003; JP: July 17, 2003; PAL: November 28, 2003
- Genre: Fighting
- Modes: Single player, multiplayer

Bloody Roar Extreme (Note: Japanese: ブラッディロア エクストリーム, Hepburn: Buraddi Roa Ekusutorīmu) is a fighting game developed by Eighting as the fourth entry in their Bloody Roar series. It was released in 2002 for the GameCube, and later ported to Xbox in 2003. In North America, the GameCube version was released under the name Bloody Roar: Primal Fury.

== Gameplay ==
Each character has a set of moves spread across a punch, kick, beast and block button, which is also used for throws. Special moves are primarily performed using quarter-circle or half-circle motions and a face button, though several exceptions exist. Attacks can be blocked with either a light guard, performed by not pressing forward or backward, or a heavy guard by holding back or the block button. Various attacks in the game can break through and stagger opponents using a light block. Various characters also have light block counters, which work against certain high or mid-level punches and kicks.

Players start each fight with a full life bar and a Beast Gauge, which allows them to transform into a stronger half-animal fighter. This gauge fills as the player performs moves or gets attacked. It fills with either a blue bar, indicating the player cannot switch to beast form, or a yellow bar with the words "BEAST CHANGE!!" appearing above it, meaning the player can transform. While in beast form, both the life bar and the Beast Gauge deplete. An emptied life bar results in a knockout, but emptying the Beast Gauge and knocking the opponent down reverts them to human form. Also, it reverts the Beast Gauge to the blue bar, preventing them from transforming again until it is refilled.

While in beast form, the player gains various effects, such as:

- An extra set of moves, performed using the beast button.
- Higher damage for attacks.
- 30 percent of any damage taken can be regenerated, shown as a blue bar extending from the life bar.
- Access to Beast Drives, powerful cinematic attacks unique to each character which deal a large amount of damage. Every character has at least two. Characters revert to human form whether the Beast Drive hits or not. Missed Beast Drives tend to replenish a bit of health.
- Additional cancel points, allowing for part of one move to quickly transition to another.
- Various additional effects. For example, the effects of some throws (e.g. damage, position relative to opponent, combo potential) change. Alice's beast form greatly increases her jump height. Bakuryu's regular punch attacks include claw slashes.
- Different victory animations, should the player stay in beast form as the fight ends.

Players can also enter a stronger, faster version of beast form called Hyper Beast for a short period of time, displayed by the Beast Gauge slowly draining, before reverting to human form. While in prior entries a full Beast Gauge was required to do this, in Extreme this form can be accessed at any time. However, engaging this form with a less-than-full bar will drain part of the character's life bar. While in Hyper Beast form:

- The timer freezes.
- Cancel points greatly increase, allowing for faster and more unpredictable sequences of attacks.
- Beast Drives do not revert a character to human form, unless the Beast Gauge empties.
- Any damage taken recovers faster than in regular beast form.

Between rounds the state of each character and their Beast Gauge is preserved. For example, if a character finishes a round in beast form with a near-empty Beast Gauge, they will start the next round that way.

Extreme's modes of play include Arcade, Versus and Training mode, as well as:

- Time Attack - Finish the Arcade mode fights as fast as possible.
- Survival - Win as many fights as possible in a row against computer opponents, earning slight life refills by winning matches quickly.
- Team Battle - Choose between three and five characters and fight opposing teams, switching characters as each gets knocked out. This mode has a multiplayer equivalent.

== Story ==
With human-Zoanthrope relations still unstable, a place called the Kingdom of Zoanthropes is founded to help end oppression and conflict. Roughly 80 percent of its residents are Zoanthropes, though both Zoanthropes and humans are considered equal. This new land, however, relies heavily on Zoanthrope soldiers and mercenaries as a source of income, selling their service to various foreign countries. Rumors also persist that the Kingdom is conducting some sort of experiments on Zoanthropes, all while some citizens object to its authoritarian rule, threatening the ideal of peace for all Zoanthropes. In an effort to demonstrate their mercenaries' strength to foreign powers and train additional soldiers, the Kingdom holds a Zoanthrope fighting tournament, with the winner earning the title of "Strongest Zoanthrope" and a large cash prize.

== Characters ==
The game features seventeen playable characters. Three are new additions:

- Ganesha, the Elephant: Real name Golan Draphan, he serves as the bodyguard to Prince Cronos. He seeks revenge for the destruction of his village.
- Cronos Orma: The prince of the Kingdom of Zoanthropes who enters the tournament in the hopes of learning the truth about his father's actions. Cronos serves as the final boss and is the only character in the series to have two Zoanthrope forms: his normal beast form is a penguin, while his hyper beast form is a phoenix.
- Fang, the Wolf: Real name Yuga Tsukigami, he is a freelance occult journalist who is investigating the Kingdom of Zoanthropes. Fang originates from the Bloody Roar: The Fang manga series by Maruyama Tomowo, appearing as a bonus character in all versions except the North American GameCube release.

The other fourteen return from previous games:

- Yugo Ogami, the Wolf.
- Alice Tsukagami, the Rabbit.
- Alan Gado, the Lion.
- Long Shin, the Tiger.
- Uriko Nonomura, the Cat.
- Kenji Ogami/Bakuryu, the Mole.
- Stun, the Insect.
- Shina, the Leopard.
- Jenny Burtory, the Bat.
- Hajime Busuzima, the Chameleon.
- Shenlong, the Tiger.
- Xion, the Unborn.
- Kohryu, the Iron Mole.
- Uranus, the Chimera.

== Development ==
Extreme's development began shortly after Bloody Roar 3 was completed. While prior entries in the series were on Sony consoles, the decision was made to move to Nintendo's GameCube primarily because of its hardware specifications. Direction Kenji Fukuya cited the lighting and shading capabilities in particular as reasons that Extreme could become the best looking Bloody Roar game. However, while the GameCube is capable of displaying games with progressive scan, this feature ultimately was not included.

Extreme includes seven new arenas and three remodeled levels from Bloody Roar 3. In addition, all characters have different character models. While the controls largely remain the same, some characters have slightly altered move sets and combos so that players do not have to press two face buttons at the same time.

While Fukuya stated in a prior interview that Extreme was "always destined for the GameCube," a port for the Xbox released roughly one year later. While ostensibly the same game, the Xbox version changed the animated cutscenes at the beginning and end of the game to computer-generated ones created by a separate team of animators. In addition, a hidden character previously only accessible in the Japanese version (Fang, the Wolf, a character from the Bloody Roar manga) was left in the North American and European releases.

== Reception ==
Reception

Aggregate score
Aggregator	Score	
Aggregator	GameCube	Xbox
Metacritic	75/100	61/100

Review scores
Publication	Score	
Publication	GameCube	Xbox
Electronic Gaming Monthly	6/10 (Note: Three critics of Electronic Gaming Monthly gave the GameCube version each a score of 6/10, 7/10, and 5/10.)	4.33/10 (Note: Two critics of Electronic Gaming Monthly gave the Xbox version each a score of 4/10, and the other gave it 5/10.)
EP Daily	8/10	N/A
Famitsu	32/40	N/A
Game Informer	8/10	6.5/10
GameRevolution	C+	C
GameSpot	7.2/10	6.5/10
GameSpy	78%	3/5
GameZone	8.5/10	6.8/10
IGN	7.7/10	7.3/10
Nintendo Power	2.8/5	N/A
Nintendo World Report	8/10	N/A
Official Xbox Magazine (US)	N/A	8.3/10
The Cincinnati Enquirer	N/A	3.5/5
Maxim	3.5/5	N/A

The GameCube version received "generally favorable reviews", while the Xbox version received "mixed" reviews, according to the review aggregation website Metacritic. In Japan, Famitsu gave the former console version a score of 32 out of 40.

GameSpot's Greg Kasavin said of the GameCube version's accessibility, "you wouldn't be lying if you tried to reassure them that it's easy to get into and get good at Bloody Roar: Primal Fury." On using the GameCube controller, he noted "Whether the GameCube controller would be good for other fighting games is still an open question, but it's perfectly fine for use with Bloody Roar: Primal Fury." Matt Casamassina of IGN praised the game's Beast Gauge system in the website's early review, describing it as "a careful dance of knowing when to change and when to stay put ensues, and thus deepens the fighting experience. It's challenging to be sure, intuitively set up and a lot of fun." On the controls, he added "The control setup, which has always come into question with the GameCube pad, works triumphantly whether one chooses to go with the analog stick or the admittedly pint-sized D-Pad."

Reviews were often critical of the game's sound design and simplicity. Kasavin said the game's soundtrack, "consisting of completely uncool guitar riffs, is perhaps a suitable match for its anime-influenced character designs, though it can also get rather irritating." Casamassina echoed the sentiment, saying the game's sound design "falls somewhere between average and "why are they using this 80's guitar riff?" Indeed, some of the musical selections are downright aged, with a dusty sound that could only be used nowadays in a Japanese 3D fighter or a Sonic the Hedgehog update." Kasavin would add "if you've ever wondered what the pejorative expression "button masher" really refers to, you'll find out when you play Bloody Roar: Primal Fury," saying that overall Primal Fury "isn't as good as any of the latest installments in the major 3D fighting game series out there, though it's totally competent and quite appealing in some ways." Star Dingo of GamePro said of the game, "As the only real 'traditional' fighter available for the 'Cube (no, Super Smash Bros. Melee doesn't count), it works just fine for now---though it probably won't be long before you're wishing Soul Calibur 2 [sic] were here." (Note: GamePro gave the GameCube version 4.5/5 for graphics, 3.5/5 for sound, and two 4/5 scores for control and fun factor.)

On the change from animated to computer-generated cutscenes for the Xbox version, Kasavin said, "For some reason, Bloody Roar Extreme replaces Primal Fury's anime intro and ending sequences with prerendered CG cutscenes that look OK at best. Bloody Roar's in-game graphics are actually better..." Other reviewers stated that the fighting system was starting to feel outdated, the graphical change and addition of a few new moves and characters wasn't enough to differentiate it from prior entries, and Hudson needed to stop recycling material from older titles.
