= Pink Sweets: Ibara Sorekara =

2006 video game

- Arcade flyer
- Developer: Cave
- Publisher: AMI
- Platform: Arcade
- Release: Arcade: JP: April 21, 2006; Xbox 360: JP: February 24, 2011
- Genre: Vertical scrolling shooter
- Modes: Single-player, multiplayer
- Arcade system: CAVE CV1000-B

Pink Sweets: Ibara Sorekara (ピンクスゥイーツ ～鋳薔薇それから～, Pinku Suītsu: Ibara Sorekara) is a 2006 manic shooter by Cave released for Japanese arcades. It was released for the Xbox 360 in 2011.

Pink Sweets is the sequel to the 2005 game Ibara.

== Gameplay ==
Arcade version screenshot

Pink Sweets is the sequel to Ibara, and features the stage 1-5 bosses from Ibara as playable characters.

Players get to pilot the gals and use a barrier/shot system to defeat flitting enemies as well as end-level bosses of the pastel-colored type. Enemies besides bosses are named after food. During the game, the gals yelp and intonate various sayings to steel themselves for battle.

Early arcade versions had an easy way to obtain infinite lives: if the players get 6 extra ships in reserve, the ships counter never goes below 2. Without this glitch, it is considered one of the hardest shoot-em-up arcade games.

== Plot ==
In Pink Sweets, the sixth and final Guardian in Ibara, did not die. Neither did any of the Rose sisters. Instead, they shifted from the dark side to the light.

== Development ==
Programmer Shinobu Yagawa worked on this game, and he had previously worked on the games Recca, Battle Garegga, and Ibara.

== Release ==
Pink Sweets was released in Japanese arcades on April 21, 2006.

Pink Sweets was released on Xbox 360 in a bundle pack with Muchi Muchi Pork! in 2011 entitled Muchi Muchi Pork! & Pink Sweets (むちむちポーク！＆ピンクスウィーツ, Muchi Muchi Pōku! ando Pinku Suītsu).

== Reception ==
Famitsu magazine awarded the compilation a score of 24/40 based on four reviews (6/6/6/6).
