= Eighting =

Japanese video game developer

Eighting Co., Ltd.
- Eighting logo, stylized as 8ing
- Native name: 株式会社エイティング
- Romanized name: Eitingu Kabushiki-gaisha
- Formerly: Raizing (1993–2000)
- Type: Kabushiki gaisha
- Industry: Video games
- Founded: 15 March 1993; 33 years ago
- Headquarters: Shinagawa, Tokyo, Japan
- Key people: Yasuhiko Sameshima (President and CEO)
- Number of employees: 293 (September 2025)
- Parent: COLOPL, Inc. (2016–present)
- Website: 8ing.co.jp

Eighting Co., Ltd., (Note: Japanese: 株式会社エイティング, Hepburn: Eitingu Kabushiki gaisha) stylized as 8ing, is a Japanese video game developer and publisher. It formerly existed as two separate companies: Eighting and Raizing. (Note: Japanese: ライジング, Hepburn: Raijingu) It is known for its shoot 'em ups and its licensed fighting games.

Eighting's name comes from nanakorobi yaoki, a Japanese proverb that says "fall down seven times and get up eight times." Raizing was derived from raijingu (rising) and Raijin, the Japanese god of lightning.

== History ==
In March 1993, former Compile staff established Raizing and Eighting to create arcade games. Raizing handled game development while Eighting did sales and distribution. Raizing included a handful of employees who worked on Musha Aleste, including Yuichi Toyama, Kazuyuki Nakashima, and Kenichi Yokoo.

Their first game, Mahou Daisakusen/Sorcer Striker, was released in May 1993. The developers were advised by Toaplan. When Toaplan closed, some staff joined Raizing. Others went on to join Cave, Gazelle, and Takumi Corporation, each of which continued Toaplan's reputation for difficult shooting games. Raizing also continued to use arcade hardware based on Toaplan's units. Composer Manabu Namiki joined the company in 1995, working on Battle Garegga, Armed Police Batrider, Terra Diver, Ghoul Panic, Dimahoo, and others before leaving in 2000. He continued to work with Eighting on fighting games, such as the Bleach: Heat the Soul series.

In October 2000, the Raizing division was incorporated into Eighting. In November 2005, Eighting filed for a public listing on the Tokyo Stock Exchange's Mothers market.

With the merger of Eighting and Raizing, the combined company began to focus on distributing mobile content for NTT Docomo’s i-mode system, Vodafone live!, and KDDI's EZweb service. It also developed a reputation for fighting games based on anime franchises, including Naruto, One Piece, Bleach, Fullmetal Alchemist, Zatch Bell, and InuYasha.

In 2008, Eighting opened a new subsidiary in Okinawa. It also opened a studio in Sapporo in 2010. By 2011, the company had a department dedicated to social network games for mobile devices.

In 2016, Eighting was acquired by COLOPL. Eighting has also partnered with Nintendo on the Pikmin series starting with Pikmin 3 Deluxe, and contributed significantly to the development of Pikmin 4. They would also begin working on the Wii Sports series beginning with the basketball update for Nintendo Switch Sports.

== List of games developed ==
List of games developed as Raizing
Year	Title	Publisher	Notes	Ref.
1993	Sorcer Striker	Able Corporation		
1994	Bomberman: Panic Bomber	Hudson Soft	Produced with Hudson Soft	
1994	Kingdom Grand Prix	Eighting		
1996	Battle Garegga	Eighting		
1996	Terra Diver	Eighting; Electronic Arts Victor; Data East		
1997	Bloody Roar	Hudson Soft/SCEA/Virgin Interactive	Produced with Hudson Soft	
1998	Armed Police Batrider	Eighting		
1999	Battle Bakraid	Able Corporation		
1999	Bloody Roar 2	Hudson Soft; SCEA; Virgin Interactive		
1999	Ghoul Panic	Namco		
1999	Golgo 13	Namco		
2000	Dimahoo	Capcom		
2000	1944: The Loop Master	Capcom		
2000	Brave Blade	Namco		
2000	Golgo 13 - Kiseki no Dandou	Namco		
2001	Golgo 13 - Juusei no Requiem	Namco		

List of games developed as Eighting
Year	Title	Publisher	Notes	Ref.
2001	Bloody Roar 3	Hudson Soft; Activision; Virgin Interactive	Produced with Hudson Soft	
2001	Kuru Kuru Kururin	Nintendo		
2001	Tekken Advance	Namco		
2002	Kururin Paradise	Nintendo		
2002	Bloody Roar: Primal Fury	Hudson Soft; Activision	Produced with Hudson Soft	
2003	Bloody Roar 4	Konami	Produced with Hudson Soft	
2003	Naruto: Clash of Ninja	Tomy		
2003	Naruto: Clash of Ninja 2	Tomy		
2004	Fullmetal Alchemist: Dream Carnival	Bandai		
2004	Kururin Squash	Nintendo		
2004	Zoids Struggle	Tomy		
2004	Naruto: Gekitō Ninja Taisen! 3	Tomy		
2005	Bleach: Heat the Soul	SCEI		
2005	Inuyasha: Feudal Combat	Bandai		
2005	Konjiki no Gash Bell!! Go! Go! Mamono Fight!!	Bandai		
2005	Zatch Bell! Mamodo Battles	Bandai		
2005	Naruto: Gekitō Ninja Taisen! 4	Tomy		
2005	Bleach: Heat the Soul 2	SCEI		
2006	Eyeshield 21 Max Devil Power	Nintendo		
2006	Eyeshield 21 Devilbats Devildays	Nintendo		
2006	Battle Stadium D.O.N	Bandai Namco	Produced with Q Interactive	
2006	Master of Illusion	Nintendo	Produced with Tenyo	
2006	Bleach: Heat the Soul 3	SCEI		
2007	Eyeshield 21 Field Saikyou no Senshitachi	Nintendo		
2007	Dragon Quest Swords: The Masked Queen and the Tower of Mirrors	Square Enix	Produced with Genius Sonority	
2007	Bleach: Heat the Soul 4	SCEI		
2007	Naruto: Clash of Ninja Revolution	Takara Tomy		
2007	Naruto Shippūden: Gekitō Ninja Taisen! EX	Takara Tomy		
2007	Naruto Shippūden: Gekitō Ninja Taisen! EX 2	Takara Tomy		
2008	Fate/unlimited codes	Capcom	Produced with Type-Moon and Cavia	
2008	Tatsunoko vs. Capcom: Cross Generation of Heroes	Capcom		
2008	Castlevania Judgment	Konami		
2008	Bleach: Heat the Soul 5	SCEI		
2008	Naruto: Clash of Ninja Revolution 2	Takara Tomy		
2008	Naruto Shippūden: Gekitō Ninja Taisen! EX 3	Takara Tomy		
2009	Kamen Rider: Climax Heroes	Bandai Namco		
2009	Kamen Rider: Dragon Knight	D3 Publisher	Nintendo DS version produced by Natsume Co., Ltd.	
2009	Naruto Shippuden: Dragon Blade Chronicles	Takara Tomy		
2009	Naruto Shippuden: Clash of Ninja Revolution 3	Takara Tomy		
2009	Bleach: Heat the Soul 6	SCEI		
2009	Kamen Rider: Climax Heroes W	Bandai Namco		
2010	Tatsunoko vs. Capcom: Ultimate All-Stars	Capcom	Updated version of Cross Generation of Heroes	
2010	Kamen Rider: Climax Heroes OOO	Bandai Namco		
2010	Bleach: Heat the Soul 7	SCEI		
2010	Naruto Shippūden: Gekitō Ninja Taisen! Special	Takara Tomy		
2011	Marvel vs. Capcom 3: Fate of Two Worlds	Capcom		
2011	Ultimate Marvel vs. Capcom 3	Capcom	Updated version of Marvel vs. Capcom 3: Fate of Two Worlds	
2011	Monster Hunter 3 Ultimate	Capcom	Produced with Capcom	
2011	Kamen Rider: Climax Heroes Fourze	Bandai Namco		
2012	Kamen Rider: Super Climax Heroes	Bandai Namco		
2013	Kamen Rider: Battride War	Bandai Namco	Produced with Bandai Namco	
2014	Kamen Rider: Battride War II	Bandai Namco	Produced with Bandai Namco	
2016	Kamen Rider: Battride War Genesis	Bandai Namco	Produced with Bandai Namco	
2016	Zoids: Field of Rebellion	Takara Tomy		
2017	Monster Hunter Generations Ultimate	Capcom	Produced with Capcom	
2017	Kamen Rider: Climax Fighters	Bandai Namco		
2020	Zoids Wild: Blast Unleashed	Takara Tomy		
2020	Zoids Wild: Infinity Blast	Takara Tomy		
2020	Pikmin 3 Deluxe	Nintendo	Ported and developed new content for the title	
2022	DNF Duel	Nexon	Developed with Arc System Works and Neople	
2023	Pikmin 4	Nintendo	Co-developed with Nintendo EPD	
2024	Nintendo Switch Sports (Free content update)	Nintendo	Co-developed free basketball content update with Nintendo.	
2025	Hunter × Hunter: Nen × Impact	Bushiroad Games Arc System Works		
2026	Nintendo Switch Sports Resort	Nintendo	Co-developed with Nintendo EPD	
