= Muchi Muchi Pork! =

2007 video game

- Developer: CAVE
- Publishers: JP: AMI; JP: CAVE (Xbox 360)
- Programmer: Shinobu Yagawa
- Composers: Daisuke Matsumoto; MASA-KING; Takeshi Miyamoto; Naohiro Saito; Natsuko Naitou
- Platforms: Arcade, Xbox 360
- Release: Arcade: JP: April 26, 2007; Xbox 360: JP: February 24, 2011
- Genre: Manic shooter
- Modes: Single-player, multiplayer
- Arcade system: CAVE CV1000B

Muchi Muchi Pork! (むちむちポーク！, Muchi Muchi Pōku!) is a 2007 arcade bullet hell cute 'em up developed by CAVE, and published by AMI. It was ported to the Xbox 360 as part of the Muchi Muchi Pork!/Pink Sweets compilation disc produced by CAVE in February 2011. An enhanced compilation called Muchi Muchi Pork & PinkSweets Boosted was announced for Windows, Nintendo Switch, and PlayStation 5 in May 2026, and will be released in October 2026.

== Gameplay ==
Arcade version screenshot

=== Scoring ===
Collecting medals is the primary scoring mechanic in the game. When an enemy is destroyed using the lard attack, they will drop medals shaped like a pig's head. If enemies are destroyed with the lard attack while a bomb is being used, they will drop "p" items instead of medals. Also, single medals will periodically drop from enemies even if they are not destroyed using the lard attack.

The medal value starts at 100 points. If there are already medals on screen, the medals that enemies drop will be of an equal value to the medals on screen. If there are no medals on screen, the medal value will increase by 100 points (if the previous value was < 1000 points), or 1000 points (if the previous value was > 1000 points). The medal value will max out at 10,000 points.

If the player switches from the B-shot to the A-shot, all medals on screen will be automatically collected. If the player fails to collect the last medal on screen, the medal value will divide by a factor of 10. The player is awarded an extent every 10 million points. An extent item can also be found if the third stage mid-boss is destroyed using the pierce shot.

Accessing the second loop requires completing the first five stages without losing a single life. If the extended item is collected in stage 3, the player can die once and still proceed to the second loop. Stages 6–10 are identical to the first five stages, but are much more difficult. In addition to this, score extends are no longer awarded.

=== Miscellaneous points ===
- Several water silos show up throughout the game. Destroying them with the lard attack will cause them to drop a large amount of parachuting pigs.
- The wind turbines in level 4 will drop medals regardless of what weapon they are destroyed with.

=== Controls ===
- Button A fires bullets whether being tapped or held down.
- Button B fires the lard attack (or pierce-shot if the lard meter is empty).
- Button C uses bombs.

=== Lard attack ===
When enemies are destroyed using the A-shot, the enemies will drop parachuting pigs that will automatically be collected when the player is near them. Collecting these pigs will fill up the lard meter at the bottom of the screen and will also increase the player's score by 1000 points. If these pigs are collected while using the B-shot, the player's score will increase, but the lard meter will not fill up. If the lard meter is empty, and the player has collected sufficient "p" items, button B will fire the lard attack. The lard attack is stronger than the regular shot, but at the expense of slowing the player's movement.

=== Bombs ===
When a bomb is used, the player is granted momentary invincibility, and a giant robot will damage enemies on screen. Any bullets that come into contact with the robot or the player will automatically be turned into parachuting pigs.

The number of bombs in stock is indicated by "B" icons at the bottom of the screen. There is also a small meter above the "B" icons that indicates a partial bomb. The partial bomb meter is filled by collecting bomb fragments that are scattered throughout the stages. Once the meter is full, another bomb is added to the stock. If the player has no bombs left, tapping the C button will use a partial bomb. The duration and strength of the partial bomb is dependent on how full the partial bomb meter was when it was used. Partial bombs do not convert bullets into pigs, but will cancel all bullets they come into contact with.

== Plot ==
The story features a trio of females from Batazuka City who have been transformed into pig-girls by the main antagonist, General Porkfillet. They ride flying motor bikes called "ketta machines", which are powered by pedaling.

The story is shown in-game, a few comic-strip style images are shown at the start, and has a short ending sequence. As in Pink Sweets, many of the character names are puns on food.

=== Characters ===
- Momo Barasoto - Muchi Muchi Pink
- Ikuo Katakuchi - Muchi Muchi Blue
- Rafute Souki - Muchi Muchi Yellow

=== Antagonists ===
- Sergeant Wing
- Major Sirloin
- Warrant Officer Lamb
- Ensign Sakura
- General Porkfillet

== Development ==
Muchi Muchi Pork! is notable for its unique art style. The character design was done by Kazuhiko Kawasaki who is known for illustrating "plump, cutesy women". His art style is evident in the game as it exclusively features overweight human/pig hybrid girls as playable characters.

=== Version 1.01 ===
This is a revised version of the original arcade release (version 1.00). In this version:

- The lard meter fills up faster.
- The player no longer has to complete the game without dying to proceed to the second loop. Simply completing the game on a single credit is sufficient.
- Extends are still awarded every 10 million points in the second loop.
- Slight variation on the font used in-game.

== Release ==
The Xbox 360 port features upscaled graphics, online leaderboards, support for vertically oriented monitors, as well as an optional rank meter. It was also included as part of the Cave Shooting Collection released on April 2, 2013.

=== Matsuri Mode ===
The first print of the port included a code to download a version of the game that features the bosses from the game Pink Sweets. This was a modified version of the game that CAVE had on display at one of their Matsuri Festivals.

After the game's original bosses are destroyed, the player has to destroy one, or sometimes two additional bosses from Pink Sweets before the level is completed. All of the scoring mechanics in this mode are the same, with one exception. Every 10 million points, the player is awarded an extra bomb in addition to an extra life. This mode can also be downloaded from the DLC disc included in the Cave Shooting Collection.

=== Boosted ===
Muchi Muchi Pork & PinkSweets Boosted will feature the upscaled graphics and other features of Pink Sweets, along with a new arrangement of the soundtrack.

== Reception ==
The arcade release of Muchi Muchi Pork! was not received well by the Japanese arcade scene, and can rarely be found in arcades today. Famitsu magazine awarded the compilation Muchi Muchi Pork! & Pink Sweets a score of 24/40 based on four reviews (6/6/6/6).
