= Battle Garegga =

1996 video game

- Japanese Arcade flyer
- Developers: Raizing; M2 (Rev.2016)
- Publishers: Eighting: Arcade; EU: Tuning; NA: Fabtek; TW: Liang HWA Electronics; HK: Metrotainment Saturn; JP: Electronic Arts PlayStation 4 Xbox One; WW: M2
- Director: Kazuyuki Nakashima
- Programmers: Shinobu Yagawa; Yasunari Watanabe; Yūichi Ochiai
- Artists: Shinsuke Yamakawa; M. Tatsuda
- Composer: Manabu Namiki
- Platforms: Arcade, Saturn, PlayStation 4, Xbox One
- Release: February 1996: Arcade; JP: February 1996; NA/EU: February 1996 Saturn; JP: 26 February 1998 Rev.2016 PS4; JP: 15 December 2016; NA: 6 October 2017 Xbox One; WW: 29 September 2017
- Genres: Bullet hell, scrolling shooter
- Modes: Single-player, multiplayer
- Arcade system: Toaplan Version 2

Battle Garegga (Note: Japanese: バトルガレッガ, Hepburn: Batoru Garegga) is a vertically scrolling shooter arcade video game developed by Raizing and published by Eighting in 1996. A port to the Saturn was published in 1998. An updated version, Battle Garegga Rev.2016 was released in 2016. It was followed by a spiritual successor, Battle Bakraid, in 1999.

== Gameplay ==
Gameplay screenshot

In addition to the player's main shot, picking up green Option power-ups will add up to four support pods to the craft. The formation of these Options can be changed to one of five presets and there are additional secret formations that can be accessed by dropping a certain number of power-ups before picking up the next. Both shot and options are fired by holding the A button.

Upon killing a regular enemy on the ground, a red Small Bomber token will appear. Picking up enough of these gives the player one Large Bomber token, but the player can use their remaining Small Bombers without a Large Bomber in stock; the duration or strength of the bomb will merely be reduced according to the percentage of a full bomb that was used. Up to five Large Bombers can be in stock at any one time, after which each Small token is worth 100 points.

Power-ups and medals drop from popcorn enemies in a fixed order. Every time a Medal is collected, the next one that spawns will be worth more, from 100 to 10,000 points, but if a medal falls off the bottom of the screen, the next one to spawn will be of the lowest value. Medals can also be found upon using a bomb on certain items of scenery.

The game features an adjustable difficulty system that will increase difficulty based on the actions of the player. Uncontrolled increase of the game's rank can quickly turn it into a manic shooter. Firing and powering up the main weapon, as well as picking up various items, will increase the difficulty of the game. Losing a life will decrease the difficulty (rank) of the game. The fewer lives a player has when they die, the more rank is decreased, thus, the game rewards a player who doesn't stock up many lives at a time. Players are thus "forced" to keep themselves powered down, conserve shots, and lose lives on purpose in order to keep the last few stages of the game playable, though it is possible to finish the game in one life given an intricate knowledge of the game's rank system and an ultra-prudent playstyle.

Unlike in most other scrolling shooter games, where bullets are often brightly colored to distinguish from the background, bullets are realistically colored, making it difficult for players to see them. Exploding enemies and objects also create flying debris, further camouflaging incoming fire. This was ameliorated to some extent in the Type 2 version, which replaces most of the standard bullets with yellow dots.

== Plot ==
Mathew Wayne, a resident of a small country town, was a mechanical genius whose aptitude and skills were passed down to his sons, Brian and Jason. After gaining leadership of his automobile factory from him, the brothers' skills became renowned throughout the country. Eventually, the Federation approached the brothers with an extremely profitable contract to help produce military vehicles for it. The Wayne brothers accepted the contract and created weapons without peer.

A short time later, the skies turned dark with the Federation's encroaching airfleet, and towns and cities everywhere were ravaged by these armies—including Brian and Jason's home town. To their horror, the Federation was using the weapons and vehicles they themselves had designed to reshape the land to their pitiless will. Taking up planes whose designs had never been submitted to the Federation, the Wayne brothers prepare to destroy the Federation's mad scheme.

== Development ==
Programmer Shinobu Yagawa worked on this game, and he had previously worked on the game Recca in 1992. He would later work on games like Ibara and its sequel, Pink Sweets.

== Release ==
The original arcade game was released on February 3, 1996, and released on Sega Saturn on February 26, 1998. The Sega Saturn version has become a rare game, and in 2014 it was listed as costing £100 in the United Kingdom. The Saturn version is also the final game on the system, and by extension any Sega console, to be published in any capacity by Electronic Arts.

In December 2016 M2 released a new version of the game called Battle Garegga Rev.2016 to PlayStation 4 as part of their M2 Shot Triggers publishing label. An Xbox One version was released the following year, along with an English version for both platforms.

== Reception ==
In Japan, Game Machine listed Battle Garegga on their March 15, 1996 issue as being the eighth most-successful arcade game of the month.

Three reviewers from the Japanese Sega Saturn Magazine gave it an 8/10 each.

German magazine Maniac gave the Saturn version a score of 57% and the PS4 version a score of 81%.

Famitsu gave Battle Garegga Rev.2016, a score of 32 out of 40.

In 2012, Hardcore Gaming 101 called the game "an absolute classic". In 2016, Eurogamer summarized: "For all its routine, slightly drab looks, this is a game of exquisite artistic intention." IGN Japan gave the PS4 version 8.9 out of 10. Reviewing the PS4 version, Push Square said: "It may be an acquired taste these days – to be fair, the same could be said of the original back in 1996 – but Battle Garegga remains a defining release in the shmup canon, and this is without a shadow of a doubt the best way to experience it."
