= List of Bomberman video games =

This is a list of Bomberman video games.

== Console and computer games ==
Title	Year	Platform	Notes
Bomber Man	(Japan) 1983 (European Union) 1984	NEC PC-8801, NEC PC-6001 mkII, Fujitsu FM-7, Sharp MZ-700, Sharp MZ-2000, Sharp X1, MSX, ZX Spectrum	Original releases in Japan named Bakudan Otoko on most covers, but Bomber Man in the game, released for MSX and ZX Spectrum in Europe as Eric and the Floaters.
3-D Bomberman	(Japan) 1984	NEC PC-8801, NEC PC-6001 mkII, MSX, Sharp X1	Uses first-person perspective. Japan-only release.
Bomberman	(Japan) 1985 (United States) 1989	NES/Famicom	Re-released on MSX in 1986 (as Bomberman Special) and on Game Boy Advance and N-Gage in 2004.
Bomberman	(Japan) 1990 (United States) (European Union) 1991	TurboGrafx-16/PC Engine, X68000, Amiga, MS-DOS, Atari ST	Released as Bomberman for the TG-16/PC Engine release, which was the first Bomberman release to support five players; first Bomberman game for the IBM-PC.
Bomberman II	(Japan) (European Union) 1991 (United States) 1993	NES/Famicom	Released as Dynablaster in Europe
Bomberman '93	(Japan) 1992 (United States) 1993	TurboGrafx-16/PC Engine	Released on Wii's Virtual Console.
Hi-Ten Bomberman	(Japan) 1993	Custom NEC PC	Considered to be the basis for Saturn Bomberman. 10-player multitap support and first game in the series to support ten players locally.
Bomberman '94 / Mega Bomberman	(Japan) 1993 (United States) (European Union) 1994	PC Engine, Mega Drive/Genesis	Japan-only release for the PC Engine version, released the following year for the Western markets on Mega Drive/Genesis as Mega Bomberman, 5-player multitap support; the PC-Engine version was later released on Wii Virtual Console (albeit untranslated) on March 23, 2009, in the US and on July 10, 2009, in Europe.
Hi-Ten Chara Bomb	(Japan) 1994	Custom NEC PC	Updated version of Hi-Ten Bomberman, which increased the arena's size and introduced selectable characters, most of which were from other Hudson properties.
Saturn Bomberman	(Japan) 1996 (United States) (European Union) 1997	Saturn	10-player multitap support; first Bomberman game with official internet support.
Atomic Bomberman	(United States) (European Union) 1997	Windows	10-player support through IPX networking; first Bomberman title for Windows, developed by Interplay Entertainment.
Bomberman 64	(Japan) (European Union) (United States) 1997	Nintendo 64	Released as Baku Bomberman in Japan; 4-player support, first Bomberman game with 3D graphics.
Saturn Bomberman Fight!!	(Japan) 1997	Saturn	Japan-only release.
Bomberman World	(Japan) (European Union) (United States) 1998	PlayStation	First in the series to be released on the PlayStation. Many of its gameplay elements were carried from the unreleased Virtual Boy title Virtual Bomberman.
Bomberman Hero	(Japan) (United States) (European Union) 1998	Nintendo 64	Focus on single-player adventure game.
Bomberman Party Edition	(Japan) 1998 (European Union) 1999 (United States) 2000	PlayStation	A PlayStation port of the original NES game from 1985. Known simply as Bomberman in Japan and Europe.
Bomberman 64: The Second Attack	(Japan) 1999 (United States) 2000	Nintendo 64	Released as Baku Bomberman 2 in Japan; first appearance of Pommy, one of the Charaboms.
Bomberman Online	(United States) October 2001	Dreamcast	US-only release; 4-player local, 8-player online support.
Bomberman 64 (2001 video game)	(Japan) December 2001	Nintendo 64	Japan-only, unrelated to the 1997 title of the same name; 4-player support, includes modes based on Panic Bomber, SameGame, and Bomberman Land.
Bomberman Generation	(United States) (Japan) (European Union) 2002	GameCube	One of the first games to use cel-shaded graphics.
Bomberman Jetters	(Japan) 2002 (United States) 2004	GameCube, PlayStation 2	PS2 release was Japan-only; based on the Bomberman Jetters anime series.
Bomberman Online	(Japan) (Korea) (Hong Kong) (Taiwan) 2003	Windows	6-player support, exclusive to Japan, South Korea, Hong Kong, Macau and Taiwan.
Net de Bomberman	(Japan) 2004	PlayStation 2	Japan-only release.
Bomberman Live	(Japan) (United States) (European Union) 2007	Xbox 360 (Xbox Live Arcade)	8-player online support.
Bomberman Blast	(European Union) (Japan) (United States) 2008	Wii, WiiWare	One of the first games announced for WiiWare; also released as an expanded retail game in Japan; 8-player support, online and offline.
Bomberman Ultra	(United States) (Japan) (European Union) 2009	PlayStation 3 (PlayStation Network)	8-player online support.
Bomberman Live: Battlefest	(Japan) (United States) (European Union) 2010	Xbox Live Arcade	Last console title to be published by Hudson Soft.
Super Bomberman R	2017	Nintendo Switch, PlayStation 4, Xbox One, Windows	Developed by Konami and HexaDrive. First major mainline console entry in seven years; supports 8-player local and online multiplayer.
Super Bomberman R Online	2020	Stadia, PlayStation 4, Xbox One, Nintendo Switch, Windows	Free-to-play battle royale title featuring 64-player multiplayer. Service was officially decommissioned on December 1, 2022.
Super Bomberman R 2	2023	Nintendo Switch, PlayStation 4, PlayStation 5, Xbox One, Xbox Series X/S, Windows	Introduced the asymmetrical "Castle" mode and a stage editor allowing players to design and share custom maps.

== Portable handheld games ==
Title	Year	Platform	Notes
Atomic Punk	(Japan) 1990 (United States) (European Union) 1991	Game Boy	Known as Bomber Boy in Japan and Dynablaster in Europe.
Bomberman GB / Wario Blast: Featuring Bomberman!	(Japan) (United States) 1994 (European Union) 1995	Game Boy	Named Wario Blast: Featuring Bomberman! outside of Japan; also Nintendo's earliest crossover game.
Bomberman GB 2	(Japan) 1995 (United States) (European Union) 1998	Game Boy	Named Bomberman GB in North America and Europe.
Bomberman GB 3	(Japan) 1996	Game Boy	Japan-only release; released in Japan for Virtual Console.
Pocket Bomberman	(Japan) 1997 (United States) (European Union) 1998	Game Boy, Game Boy Color	GBC release only in the US and in Europe.
Bomberman Quest	(Japan) 1998 (United States) (European Union) 1999	Game Boy Color	Action-adventure video game.
Bomberman Max	(Japan) 1999 (United States) 2000	Game Boy Color	Released in two variants, Red Challenger and Blue Champion editions.
Bomberman Story / Bomberman Tournament	(Japan) (United States) (European Union) 2001	Game Boy Advance	4-player support.
Bomberman Max 2	(Japan) (United States) (European Union) 2002	Game Boy Advance	Released in two variants, Blue Advance and Red Advance.
Bomberman Jetters: Densetsu no Bomberman	(Japan) 2002	Game Boy Advance	Japan-only release; based on the Bomberman Jetters anime series.
Bomberman	(United States) (European Union) 2004	N-Gage	2-player support over wireless play via Bluetooth. First title in the series to support wireless play.
Bomberman (2005)	(Japan) (United States) (European Union) 2005	Nintendo DS	8-player support over wireless play, but no internet Wi-Fi support.
Bomberman (2006)	(Japan) (United States) 2006 (European Union) 2007	PlayStation Portable	4-player support over wireless play; North America.
Bomberman Story DS	(Japan) (European Union) 2007	Nintendo DS	4-player support over Wi-Fi connection.
Bomberman 2	(Japan) 2008 (European Union) 2009	Nintendo DS	Named Custom Battler Bomberman in Japan.
Bomberman Blitz	(Japan) (European Union) (United States) 2009	DSiWare	8-player support over wireless play and 4-player support over Wi-Fi connection.

== Sub-series ==
=== Super Bomberman series ===
Title	Year	Platform	Notes
Super Bomberman	(Japan) (United States) (European Union) 1993	Super Famicom/SNES	4-player multitap support. First title in the series to be released on the SNES.
Super Bomberman 2	(Japan) (United States) (European Union) 1994	Super Famicom/SNES	4-player multitap support.
Super Bomberman 3	(Japan) (European Union) 1995	Super Famicom/SNES	5-player multitap support, Japan and Europe release only.
Super Bomberman 4	(Japan) 1996	Super Famicom	Japan-only release. Later localized into English as part of Super Bomberman Collection.
Super Bomberman 5	(Japan) 1997	Super Famicom	Japan-only release. Last title in the series to be released on the Super Famicom. Later localized into English as part of Super Bomberman Collection.
Super Bomberman R	(United Nations) 2017 (Japan) (United States) (European Union) 2018	Nintendo Switch PlayStation 4, Xbox One, Windows	Developed by Konami and Hexadrive, 6th game in the Super Bomberman Series. 8-player online and offline support.
Super Bomberman R Online	(Japan) (United States) (European Union) 2020	Stadia, PlayStation 4, Xbox One, Nintendo Switch, Windows	First game in the series to 64 player multiplayer. First released on Stadia, then PlayStation 4, Xbox One, Nintendo Switch, and Steam later in 2021. Added content via seasons. Service shutdown Thursday, December 1, 2022 at 01:00 UTC.
Super Bomberman R 2	(Japan) (United States) (European Union) 2023	Nintendo Switch, PlayStation 4, PlayStation 5 Xbox One, Xbox Series X/S, Windows	Introduced Castle Mode and a level editor, where players can create their own battle maps and share them online.

=== Bomberman Land series ===
Title	Year	Platform	Notes
Bomberman Land	(Japan) 2000	PlayStation	Japan-only release.
Bomberman Land 2	(Japan) 2003	GameCube, PlayStation 2	Japan-only release.
Bomberman Land 3	(Japan) 2005	PlayStation 2	Japan-only release.
Bomberman Land Touch!	(Japan) (United States) 2006 (European Union) (South Korea) 2007	Nintendo DS	8-player support over wireless play, 4-player internet Wi-Fi.
Bomberman Land (Wii)	(Japan) 2007 (United States) (European Union) 2008	Wii	Remake of 2000 Japan-only release, designed to take advantage of Wii controller.
Bomberman Land (PSP)	(Japan) 2007 (United States) (European Union) 2008	PlayStation Portable	4-player support with one per system or with only one copy of the game.
Bomberman Land Touch! 2	(Japan) 2007 (United States) (European Union) 2008	Nintendo DS	8-player support over wireless play and 4-player support over Wi-Fi connection.

== Other games ==
=== Arcade video games ===
Title	Year	Platform	Notes
Bomberman	(Japan) (United States) (European Union) 1991	Arcade	Known as Dynablaster and Atomic Punk in Western regions. Sinclair User gave it an 85% score, and Zero rated it 4 out of 5.
Bomberman World	(Japan) (United States) (European Union) 1992	Arcade	Known as Dynablaster Global Quest and Atomic Punk Global Quest/Atomic Punk 2 in Western regions.
Neo Bomberman	(Japan) (United States) (European Union) 1997	Neo Geo MVS	Second and only title of the series to be released on the Neo Geo that retained its traditional gameplay. Never released for the Neo Geo AES and Neo Geo CD.

=== Mobile and phone games ===
Title	Year	Platform	Notes
Bomberman Touch: The Legend of Mystic Bomb	2008	iOS	
Bomberman Touch 2: Volcano Party	2009	iOS	
Bomberman Dojo	2010	Android, iOS	
Bomberman Disney Stitch Edition	2010	Mobile phone	
Bomberman Chains	2011	iOS	
100-nin Taisen Bomberman	2012	Android, iOS	
Bomberman	2014	Android, iOS	
VS! Bomberman	2016	Android, iOS	Named 対戦！ボンバーマン in Japan.
Amazing Bomberman	2022	iOS	

=== Compilations and re-releases ===
Title	Year	Platform	Notes
Bomberman Collection	(Japan) 1996	Game Boy	Compilation of Bomber Boy, Bomberman GB and Bomberman GB2
Bomberman Selection	(Korea) 2003	Game Boy Color	Compilation of Bomber Boy and Bomberman GB2
Bomberman Collection Vol. 1	(Japan) (United States) 2003	PC	Compilation of the TurboGrafx-16/PC-Engine Bomberman and Bomberman '93, as well as PlayStation Bomberman World
Bomberman Collection Vol. 2	(Japan) 2004	PC	Compilation of the SNES Super Bomberman 1–3 and PlayStation Bomberman Party Edition
Super Bomberman Collection	(Japan) (United States) (European Union) 5 February 2026	Nintendo Switch, Nintendo Switch 2, PlayStation 5, Xbox Series X/S, Windows	Compilation of all five Super Bomberman games and both Famicom games.

== Spin-offs ==
Title	Year	Platform	Notes
Bomber King / RoboWarrior	(Japan) 1987 (United States) 1988 (European Union) 1989	Famicom/NES, MSX	Released outside Japan under the name RoboWarrior; Bomberman-like progressive adventure game
Bomber King: Scenario 2 / Blaster Master Boy/Jr.	(Japan) (European Union) 1991 (United States) 1992	Game Boy	Sequel to Bomber King; slightly altered and released by Sunsoft in America and PAL regions under the Blaster Master license
Bomberman: Panic Bomber	(Japan) 1994 (United States) 1995	PC Engine CD, Neo Geo, Super Famicom, NEC PC-9821, FM Towns, X68000, Virtual Boy, PlayStation Portable	Puzzle game, similar to Puyo Puyo and Tetris; all versions except for Neo Geo and Virtual Boy are Japan-exclusive; the original PC-Engine CD version is available for North America and Europe through Wii U Virtual Console (albeit untranslated); Super Famicom version later localized into English as part of Super Bomberman Collection
Bomberman B-Daman	(Japan) 1996	Super Famicom	Based on the Japanese marble shooting toy B-Daman.
Bomberman Wars	(Japan) 1998	PlayStation, Saturn	Japan-only release; tactical role-playing game (TRPG)
Bomberman Fantasy Race	(Japan) 1998 (United States) 1999 (European Union) 2000	PlayStation	Racing game
Bomberman B-Daman Bakugaiden: The Road to Victory	(Japan) 1999	Game Boy Color	Japan-only release; based on the anime series, Bomberman B-Daman Bakugaiden, role-playing game
Bomberman B-Daman Bakugaiden V: Final Mega Tune	(Japan) 2000	Game Boy Color	Japan-only release; based on the anime series, Bomberman B-Daman Bakugaiden V, role-playing game
Bomberman Kart	(Japan) 2001 (European Union) 2003	PlayStation 2	Released in Japan and PAL regions only; kart racing game
Bomberman Jetters: Game Collection	(Japan) 2003	Game Boy Advance	Japan-only release; based on the Bomberman Jetters anime series.
DreamMix TV World Fighters	(Japan) 2003	GameCube, PlayStation 2	Released in Japan only; crossover fighting game featuring Bomberman as a playable character.
Bomberman Battles / Bomberman Hardball	(Japan) 2004 (European Union) 2005	PlayStation 2	Released in Japan and PAL regions only; sports and party game
Bomberman: Act Zero	(Japan) (United States) (European Union) 2006	Xbox 360	Realistic re-envisioning of the character.
Bomberman: Disney Stitch Edition	(Japan) 2010	Mobile phone	A Bomberman game based on the Lilo & Stitch anime spin-off series Stitch! that features the titular alien replacing Bomberman
Bomberman Chains	(Japan) 2011	iOS	Puzzle game, similar to Candy Crush Saga.
Bombergirl	(Japan) 2018	Arcade	An arcade spinoff.
Amazing Bomberman	(Japan) (United States) (European Union) 5 August 2022	iOS	Rhythm action spinoff.

== Cancelled games ==
Title	Year	Platform	Notes
Dyna Blaster	(European Union) 1991 (C64) (European Union) 1992 (Lynx)	Atari Lynx, Commodore 64	C64 port was 70% complete prior to discontinuation of development. Atari Lynx version was listed on April 2, 2007, at the Retro Isle. No prototype of each version has surfaced.
Bomberman Legends	(United States) (European Union) 1995	Atari Jaguar	It was an exclusive entry of the franchise that was being developed for the Atari Jaguar by Genetic Fantasia and planned to be published by Atari Corporation with the license from Hudson Soft.
Virtual Bomberman (Note: Virtual Bomberman (バーチャル ボンバーマン, Bācharu Bonbāman))	(Japan) 1996	Virtual Boy	It was an exclusive entry of the franchise that was being developed and planned to be published by Hudson Soft for the Virtual Boy. It was shown in Hudson's booth on Famicom Space World '95 but its release date was postponed multiple times until it was cancelled in 1996 due to the system's lack of success on the market, but many of its gameplay elements that were planned to be introduced can be seen in Bomberman World, which was released 2 years later. A flyer and a keshi mini figure of the villain God Bomber exists. A prototype from the Famicom Space World '95 show exist but no traces of it has been found.
Bomberman (Note: Bomberman 3DS (ボンバーマン 3DS, Bonbāman 3DS))	(Japan) (United States) (European Union) 2011	Nintendo 3DS	Working title. It was an exclusive entry of the franchise that was being developed for the Nintendo 3DS. It was the last title in the series to be developed by Hudson Soft before merging with Konami in 2011.

== Clones ==
Title	Year	Platform	Notes
Exvania	(Japan) 1992	Arcade	Developed by Namco.
XBlast	1993	PC (Windows) and UNIX/Linux	XBlast is a multiplayer version released under the GNU General Public License by Marc Oliver Vogel for Windows and X11R5/R6.
Penguin Tower	(United Kingdom) 1994	Commodore 64	Developed by Problemchild Productions. 2-player simultaneous support. Released on October's 1994 issue of Commodore Format.
Mega Blast	(Poland) 1995	Amiga, DOS	Developed by LK Avalon.
Dstroy	(France) 1995	MS-DOS	Developed by Fully Bugged Software.
Spark World	(Japan) 1995	Super Famicom	Developed by Den'Z.
Taiketsu! Rooms (Note: Taiketsu! Rooms (対決るみーず!, Taiketsu! Rumiizu))	(Japan) 1995	3DO Interactive Multiplayer, PlayStation	4-player multitap support.
The Perfect General	(United States) 1996	3DO	A mini-game of a similar style is included as a free bonus only on the 3DO version.
Bomberman 2	1997	MSX	Not to be confused with the 1991 title of the same name. Developed by Paragon Productions, it was designed similar to Super Bomberman 2. Released as freeware in 2011.
TNT Terry	(Netherlands) 1998	Atari Lynx	Developed by Laurens Simonis and Yiri T. Kohl. It was announced in 1998, with plans to include a single-player mode and a level editor alongside the multiplayer mode, among other features, with plans to support up to 6-player via link cable. It was showcased on JagFest '98 and World of Atari 1998 Show. Development was abruptly stopped between 1998 and 1999 for unknown reasons before nearing completion, and it has not been released on any form by the authors. Only 3 prototypes are known to exist in the hands of collectors.
Bakudanjin	1999	Apple Macintosh	An arcade-style game with the same game mechanic as Bomberman but with different game modes and original characters.
Mr.Boom	(France) 1999; 2017 (RetroArch)	MS-DOS, RetroArch	Freeware network compatible Bomberman clone originally.
TNT	(France) 2008	Atari Jaguar	Developed by The Removers. It was showcased at the Atari Connexion 2008 event hosted by Retro-gaming Connexion. Not released yet. 8-player multitap support.
PopTag!	2009	PC (Windows)	Released by Crazy Arcade; Nexon America runs a global version, almost exactly the same as Bomberman and is an MMO.
Bomberland	(United Kingdom) 2013	Commodore 64	Developed by Samar Productions and published by RGCD. 5-player support (keyboard and 4-player adapter needed). It was released as a free download on February 12, 2018.
Basement Crawl	2014	PlayStation 4	Developed and published by Bloober Team.
BomberMan	2014	Windows Phone	Bomberman-inspired game by independent developer.
Dynablaster Revenge	(Germany) (Greece) 2014	Windows, Linux, MacOS	Developed by Titan/Haujobb. Supports up to 10 players, network support and comes with 3 different worlds. Source code is available on GitHub. The game is free and can be downloaded either on GitHub or on itch.io. Dynablaster Revenge comes for Linux, Windows and MacOS.
KABOOM!	2015	Apple IIGS	Developed and published by Ninjaforce. 4-player support.
Alice Dreams Tournament	2016	Dreamcast	Funded via Kickstarter in 2015.
Robee Blaster	(France) 2017	ColecoVision	Developed by Jean-Michel Girard and published by CollectorVision, it is designed similar to Bomberman II.
ESDBomber	(Austria) 2018	Windows, Linux	Cross platform multiplayer bomberman clone, developed by students of the University of Applied Sciences Hagenberg.
Bomber Games	2020	Windows	Up to 8 local layers, new mechanics, level editor.
Mr. Bomber	2023	Xbox One, Xbox Series X/S, Windows	Classic bomberman for modern platforms.
