= Kazuko Sugiyama =

Japanese actress

- 杉山 佳寿子
- Born: Kazuko Shibukawa; April 9, 1947 (age 79); Nagoya, Aichi, Japan
- Occupations: Actress; voice actress
- Years active: 1966–present
- Agent: Aoni Production
- Notable work: Bomberman as Bomberman; Alps no Shōjo Heidi as Heidi; Urusei Yatsura as Ten; Dr. Slump and Arale-chan as Akane Kimidori; Gatchaman as Jun the Swan
- Height: 153 cm (5 ft 0 in)

Kazuko Shibukawa (渋川 佳寿子, Shibukawa Kazuko; born April 9, 1947), known by her stage name Kazuko Sugiyama (杉山 佳寿子, Sugiyama Kazuko), is a Japanese actress and voice actress who was born in Nagoya and works for Aoni Production.

In February 2010, she received a "Merit Award" from the 4th Seiyu Awards.

== Filmography ==
=== Anime ===
- Hanako Mori in Inakappe Taishō (1970)
- Mako Urashima in Mahō no Mako-chan (1970)
- Jun the Swan in Gatchaman (1972)
- Shishio Sarari in Jungle Kurobe (1973)
- Heidi in Heidi, Girl of the Alps (1974)
- Laura Ingalls in Laura, the Prairie Girl (1975)
- Marina's sister in Hans Christian Andersen's The Little Mermaid (1975)
- Naida, Commander Kirika in UFO Robo Grendizer (1975)
- Princess Aurora in SF Saiyūki Starzinger (1978–1979)
- Francoise Arnoul/003 in Cyborg 009 (1979)
- Ten in Urusei Yatsura (1981)
- Chao/Katy in The Fantastic Adventures of Unico (1981)
- Akane Kimidori in Dr. Slump (1981)
- Ganmo in Gu Gu Ganmo (1984)
- Colonel Violet in Dragon Ball (1987)
- White in Pink: Water Bandit, Rain Bandit (1990)
- Korosuke in Kiteretsu Daihyakka (episodes 87 to 331) (1990)
- Rui Ijigawa in Magical Taruruto-kun (1990)
- Celebi in Pocket Monsters the Movie: Celebi, A Timeless Encounter (2001)
- Fuzuki Kōyama in Full Moon o Sagashite (2002)
- Bokomon in Digimon Frontier (2002)
- Kikuko (Agatha) in Pocket Monsters: Advanced Generation (2005)
- Maria von Glanzreich in The Royal Tutor (2017)

Unknown date

- Dante (Old) in Fullmetal Alchemist
- Camelot in Fushigiboshi no Futagohime
- Childhood of Kento in Future Robot Daltanious
- Mirai in Queen Millennia
- Sakura in Ranma ½
- Charlotte in La Seine no Hoshi
- Ranmaru in Haikara-san ga Tōru
- Lolo in The Adventures of Scamper the Penguin
- Makiko in Tamagotchi: The Movie

=== Video games ===
- Bomberman in Bomberman: Panic Bomber (1994)
- Bomberman in Super Bomberman: Panic Bomber W (1995)
- Bomberman in Super Bomberman 3 (1995)
- Bomberman in Super Bomberman 4 (1996)
- Bomberman in Super Bomberman 5 (1997)
- Bomberman Neo Bomberman (1997)
- Bomberman in Bomberman 64 (1997)
- White Bomber and Black Bomber in Saturn Bomberman Fight!! (1997)
- Bomberman in Bomberman World (1998)
- Bomber Cleric, Bomber Bishop, Bomber Cerberus, and Bomber Prince in Bomberman Wars (1998)
- White Bomber and Black Bomber Bomberman Fantasy Race (1998)
- Bomberman in Bomberman Party Edition (1998)
- Jun the Swan in Tatsunoko vs. Capcom (2008)

=== Drama CDs ===
- Gohan wo Tabeyou series 5 & 6 (Yoshie Kuga)

=== Dubbing ===
- Josie and the Pussycats (Josie McCoy)
- Watership Down (Fiver)

== Awards ==
Year	Award	Category	Result	Ref.
2010	4th Seiyu Awards	Achievement Award	Won	
2019	Tokyo Anime Awards 2019	Merit Award	Won	
