= Bomberman Land (Wii video game) =

2007 video game

- Developer: Racjin
- Publishers: JP/NA: Hudson Soft; PAL: Rising Star Games
- Composer: Isao Kasai
- Series: Bomberman
- Platform: Wii
- Release: JP: March 8, 2007; NA: January 29, 2008; EU: March 14, 2008; AU: March 20, 2008
- Genres: Action, puzzle
- Modes: Single-player, multiplayer

Bomberman Land, known in Japan as Bomberman Land Wii (ボンバーマンランド Wii, Bonbāman Rando Wii), is an action puzzle video game developed by Racjin and published by Hudson Soft. It was released in Japan for Wii on March 8, 2007, January 29, 2008 in North America, and March 14, 2008 in the PAL region. Part of the Bomberman franchise, it is the fifth game in the Bomberman Land series and the console counterpart to the portable version released for the PlayStation Portable later in the same month.

== Plot ==
Relaxing on the beach, Bomberman gets an invitation to enter an amusement park called "Bomberman Land", which he accepts. Upon arrival, he finds that his friends Cool Black and Cute Pink have also gotten invitations, as well as Giant Gold and his teammates of Team Gold, Kid Blue and Bookworm Green. After all the contestants arrive, the Director appears and tells them all about the park, the events and the rankings, and wishes them all the best of luck. The Champion appears on the big screen and tells the contestants that he has taken over the park as well as taking the Director hostage. In time, the once fun land will become a place of chaos, so it is up to Bomberman to play the different events, win as many pieces as possible, and dethrone the Champion.

== Gameplay ==
There are over forty attractions to be played in the differing Zones in the park. Before they can be played, the attractions can be accessed in Training, in which they are divided into five difficulty levels. There is no limit to how many times the player can redo the Training sessions if the player fails. The player wins training points depending on which difficulty is beaten, and if all five are completed, players receive an item.

In the actual Zone, the player is given a certain amount of tokens to play the attractions. There are three different attraction types in the game: Single Player, Two Player, and Four Player. The Single Player attractions are worth 1 token, while multiplayer attractions can cost upwards to the total amount of tokens given. Zone Pieces are awarded based on how well Bomberman ranks in the specific events, as well as the specific ranks against opponents in multiplayer attractions. The higher the ranking, the more pieces are awarded, and in turn places Bomberman in a higher over-all rank. If a rank lower than A is achieved, the player can play the event again at the cost of another token, but runs the risk of lowering their over-all rank.

=== Multiplayer ===
Bomberman Land Wii features the classic Bomberman Battle mode multiplayer. The Battle mode is also much more customizable than in past iterations of the game; multiple player options are available, and select rules can be chosen depending on the game being played.

== Reception ==
Reception

Aggregate score
Aggregator	Score
Metacritic	57/100

Review scores
Publication	Score
1Up.com	C
Famitsu	28/40
Game Informer	6.5/10
GamesMaster	54%
GamesRadar+	2.5/5
GameZone	5.9/10
IGN	7.2/10
Nintendo Power	5/10
Official Nintendo Magazine	59%
VideoGamer.com	5/10

The game received "mixed" reviews according to the review aggregation website Metacritic. In Japan, however, Famitsu gave it a score of 28 out of 40.
