= Bomberman Blast =

2008 video game

- North America WiiWare cover art
- Developer: Hudson Soft
- Publisher: Hudson Soft
- Director: Tatsumitsu Watanabe
- Producer: Kentaro Murayama
- Composers: Hironobu Yahata; Shinya Otoge
- Series: Bomberman
- Platforms: Wii, WiiWare
- Release: WiiWare: EU: September 12, 2008; NA: September 29, 2008; JP: September 30, 2008; Wii: JP: September 25, 2008
- Genre: Action
- Modes: Single-player, multiplayer

Bomberman Blast is an action game developed and published by Hudson Soft for the Wii and WiiWare as part of the Bomberman franchise. The game was released as two versions: a fully featured retail release and a WiiWare version known as Wi-Fi 8-Nin Battle Bomberman (Wi-Fi8人バトル ボンバーマン, Wi-Fi8 Nin Batoru Bonbāman). The retail version was released in Japan on September 25, 2008, while the WiiWare version was released on September 30, 2008. The WiiWare version was released in Europe on September 12, 2008, and in North America on September 29, 2008.

== Gameplay ==
The WiiWare version of Bomberman Blast only contains the traditional battle mode, while the retail release also includes a story mode and other additional features. The plot of the story mode revolves around Bomberman saving the player's Miis by defeating five bosses who have kidnapped them. The story mode covers 39 stages across 5 worlds, featuring 31 different unique enemies.

The game features new items, such as a rocket that enables the player to fly, and a shield. A number of items are activated by shaking the Wii Remote. In the retail version, players are also able to purchase upgrades and power-ups by cashing in gems collected during play, such as Hearts, Fire Ups, Bomb Ups and Speed Ups. In addition, players are also able to use their Miis during play, and the retail version features a mode called Bomberman for Beginners which teaches novice players the basics of the game.

The game is primarily controlled with the Wii Remote held on its side NES gamepad-style. It also supports GameCube controllers but not Classic Controllers; and supports 480p and 16:9 widescreen display modes, but does not output in Dolby Pro Logic II. When four Wii remotes and four GameCube controllers are used in conjunction, this game can support 8-player offline play.

=== Battle mode ===
The game's battle mode features eight-player, worldwide online play with rankings, and players with the retail and WiiWare versions of the game are able to compete against each other. 10 battle stages are included with the WiiWare version, while the retail release includes an extra 2 stages, for a total of 12. Eight-player battle mode is supported by having four players using GameCube controllers and four players using Wii remotes.

Battle mode also introduces "appeal motions", an emote players can perform. WiiWare players have access to 10 motions, while retail players have access to 20 in total.

== Development and release ==
2008, the year Bomberman Blast was released, was the 25th anniversary of the Bomberman franchise. The game is developed in-house by Hudson, unlike Bomberman Live for Xbox Live Arcade which was outsourced to Backbone Entertainment. The game was originally scheduled to be released in June 2008, but was later delayed to September 2008 due to Hudson wanting to make sure the online mode was top-notch.

The official website initially opened on March 28, 2008, and fully opened on July 11, 2008. The final name was revealed through the game's rating by the German USK on July 9, 2008.

To celebrate the release of Bomberman Blast, Hudson held a Bomberman Blast tournament called "Bomb It Up".

== Reception ==
Reception

Aggregate score
Aggregator	Score
Metacritic	86/100

Review scores
Publication	Score
Eurogamer	8/10
Famitsu	24/40
IGN	8.1/10
NGamer	5/5
Nintendo Life	8/10
Official Nintendo Magazine	88%
Retro Gamer	85%

The game received "favorable" reviews according to the review aggregation website Metacritic. In Japan, however, Famitsu gave the retail version a score of one seven, one five, and two sixes for a total of 24 out of 40.

Eurogamer was impressed by the many game modes and options available, although they believed the game was "a tad pricey" at 1000 Wii Points, but otherwise felt that "it's hard to quibble over such a dependable game". Official Nintendo Magazine called it a "brilliant version" of Bomberman and recommended it over Bomberman '93 on the Virtual Console. However, despite the general praise of the online play, they did voice some minor concern about "a few instances" of lag, and also believed some players may be put off by the WiiWare version's focus on multiplayer battling. The magazine also ranked it the 98th best game available on Nintendo platforms. IGN claimed that despite the lack of innovation and some minor interface hiccups, the game is "a blast to play" and maintains "that classic, addictive quality" from past Bomberman games.

== Sequel ==
A sequel was announced by Hudson titled Bomberman Live: Battlefest on WiiWare in 2009. However, the release was cancelled for WiiWare, and released only on Xbox Live Arcade in 2010.

== See also ==
- List of Bomberman games
- List of Wii games
- List of WiiWare games
- List of Wii Wi-Fi Connection games
