= Bomberman 64 =

Bomberman 64 may refer to:

- Bomberman 64 (1997 video game), developed by Hudson Soft
- Bomberman 64: The Second Attack, the sequel to Bomberman 64
- Bomberman 64 (2001 video game), developed by Racjin
