= Bomberman Land Touch! 2 =

2007 video game

- Developer: Hudson Soft
- Publishers: JP/NA: Hudson Soft; PAL: Rising Star Games
- Series: Bomberman
- Platform: Nintendo DS
- Release: JP: July 19, 2007; NA: January 29, 2008; EU: March 13, 2008; AU: March 14, 2008
- Genre: Puzzle
- Modes: Single-player, multiplayer

Bomberman Land Touch! 2 (Note: Japanese: タッチ！ボンバーマンランド 〜スターボンバーのミラクル★ワールド〜, Hepburn: Tatchi! Bonbāman Rando 〜Sutā Bonbā no Mirakuru★Wārudo〜; lit. Touch! Bomberman Land: Star Bomber's Miracle World) is a puzzle video game for the Nintendo DS released in Japan on July 19, 2007, and in North America, Europe, and Australia in 2008. Part of the Bomberman franchise, it is the sequel to Bomberman Land Touch! and the seventh game in the Bomberman Land series.

== Plot ==
In the beginning of the game's story mode, Cheerful White (Bomberman) and his friends are traveling by boat towards Bom-Bom Kingdom, a theme park owned by a magician known as Star Bomber. Originally, Bomberman's friend Giant Gold planned to take Cute Pink to the island for a date, but in the end, Cheerful White and his friends came along as well. The story mode follows Cheerful White as he explores the Bom-Bom Kingdom theme park, and takes part in its attractions.

== Gameplay ==
Bomberman Land Touch! 2 features similar gameplay to its predecessor. It has three modes of play: Story, Battle, and Attractions. In Story mode, players control Cheerful White in a theme park in a top-down perspective, where they search for items to unlock different zones and mini-games. Battle mode features the traditional gameplay structure of the Bomberman series, where players are tasked with dropping bombs to break through walls in a maze that separate each other. The objective is to survive until the end, typically by blowing the opponents up with the bombs. Attractions mode allows players to replay mini-games that they have unlocked.

== Release ==
Bomberman Land Touch! 2 was confirmed alongside Bomberman Land on Wii and Bomberman Land on PlayStation Portable. Where a North American version was planned for January 29, 2008, Konami did not then confirm whether it would come to Europe.

== Reception ==
Reception

Aggregate score
| Aggregator | Score |
|---|---|
| Metacritic | 74/100 |

Review scores
| Publication | Score |
|---|---|
| 1Up.com | B+ |
| 4Players | 75% |
| Eurogamer | 7/10 |
| Famitsu | (DS) 29/40; 27/40 |
| GameRevolution | B− |
| GamesRadar+ | 4/5 |
| GameZone | 7/10 |
| IGN | 7.9/10 |
| Nintendo Power | 6/10 |
| Pocket Gamer | 4/5 |

Since its release, Bomberman Land Touch! 2 received "mixed or average reviews" according to the review aggregation website Metacritic. In Japan, Famitsu gave it a score of one five, two sevens and one eight, while Famitsu DS gave it a score of three sevens and one eight.

GameSpot's preview praised it for its battle mode and its assortment of mini-games. IGN enjoyed its mini-games and multi-player mode, but felt that it did not offer much to those who purchased the first Bomberman Land Touch! GamesRadar+ agreed, also noting their disappointment that the mini-games did not feature online play. Pocket Gamer felt it not as original compared to its predecessor, while noting it as a "worthy successor." Writer Matthew Madeiro of Engadget (formerly Joystiq) was critical of the game's story and soundtrack, but found the mini-games good, despite their otherwise negative view of mini-games in video games. While GameRevolution found the Battle mode fun and the mini-games inventive, they found the backtracking in the story mode to be excessive. Eurogamer found the single-player mode to be superior to earlier Bomberman game Bomberman Story DS and noted how it continuously engaged them by providing new things to unlock all the time.
