= B64 =

B64 may refer to:

- B64 (New York City bus), a bus route in Brooklyn, New York City
- Base64, an encoding scheme
- Design B-65 cruiser, a class of Super Type A cruisers planned by the Imperial Japanese Navy
- Sicilian, Richter-Rauzer variation in chess (code B64)

== See also ==
- Bomberman 64 (disambiguation)
