= Bomberman (2005 video game) =

2005 video game

- North American cover art
- Developer: Racjin
- Publishers: JP: Hudson Soft; WW: Ubisoft
- Directors: Hideki Yayama; Takeshi Murata
- Producer: Hiromi Tomisawa
- Composer: Morihiro Iwamoto
- Series: Bomberman
- Platform: Nintendo DS
- Release: JP: May 19, 2005; NA: June 21, 2005; PAL: June 30, 2005
- Genres: Action, Puzzle
- Modes: Single player, multiplayer

Bomberman (ボンバーマン, Bonbāman) is a 2005 video game developed by Racjin for the Nintendo DS. It was released by Hudson Soft in Japan on May 19, 2005, and published worldwide by Ubisoft. The game is notable for its chibi art style, previously seen in the Bomberman Land series.

Part of the Bomberman franchise, it is the first entry to be released on the platform. A sequel, Bomberman 2, was released in 2008.

== Gameplay ==
The single player mode features 10 levels with 10 stages each, a bonus stage after the 5th stage, and a boss battle for the 10th stage. A new mechanic is the item screen. All items collected are added to a stock. Using the touch screen, the player can use the items to power Bomberman up; thus, if Bomberman dies, the player can use any reserve items available to restart a stage with some power or even full power.

The multiplayer mode uses the touch screen to expand the playing area, with tunnels connecting the two screens. Some arenas make use of the microphone to do certain things like setting off remote bombs and using the shield. The revenge bomb setting adds a whole new level to multiplayer gameplay by allowing a player to throw bombs after they are eliminated from the game by flicking them off the touch screen with the stylus. If Super Revenge mode is activated, if a player blows up another player using a flicked Revenge bomb, the player respawns where their opponent fell.

Bomberman is one of many games on the Nintendo DS which allows a player without a copy of the game to participate. Players are able to temporarily download a full copy of the multiplayer game from someone who has the game.

== Reception ==
Reception

Aggregate score
Aggregator	Score
Metacritic	75/100

Review scores
Publication	Score
Edge	7/10
Electronic Gaming Monthly	7.5/10 (Note: In Electronic Gaming Monthly's review of the game, two critics gave it each a score of 8/10, and the other gave it 6.5/10.)
Eurogamer	8/10
Famitsu	26/40
Game Informer	6/10
GamePro	4/5
GameRevolution	B
GameSpot	7.8/10
GameSpy	4/5
IGN	7.5/10
Jeuxvideo.com	14/20
Nintendo Power	7/10
Nintendo World Report	8/10
Pocket Gamer	3.5/5
Detroit Free Press	3/4
The Sydney Morning Herald	3.5/5

The game received "generally favorable reviews" according to the review aggregation website Metacritic. In Japan, however, Famitsu gave it a score of 26 out of 40.
