= Neo Bomberman =

1997 video game

- Developer: Produce! (Note: Additional work by ADS and Now Production)
- Publisher: Hudson Soft
- Director: Eddy Chiu
- Producer: Hiroshi Igari
- Designers: Shinji Imada; Takayuki Hirai
- Programmer: Takuji Kosasa
- Artists: Atsushi Sugiyama; Hiromi Shimada; Jun Kusaka
- Composer: Now Production
- Series: Bomberman
- Platform: Arcade
- Release: JP: 1 May 1997
- Genres: Action, maze
- Modes: Single-player, multiplayer
- Arcade system: Neo Geo MVS

Neo Bomberman (Note: Japanese: ネオ・ボンバーマン, Hepburn: Neo Bonbāman) is an action-maze arcade video game developed by Produce! and published by Hudson Soft for the Neo Geo MVS on May 1, 1997. It is one of two games in the Bomberman franchise that was released for the Neo Geo platform, the first being Panic Bomber, and the only one to retain its traditional top-down gameplay. It was released for the Neo Geo MVS (arcade) and has not received a home console release to date. It was the last original Bomberman title to be released for arcades until Konami's Bombergirl in 2018.

In Neo Bomberman, the plot revolves around White Bomberman and Black Bomberman along with many other combatants gathering together for the Bomberman Tournament before Professor Bagura appears in a mobile fortress to spoil the tournament and kidnaps the combatants by putting them into cages and as a result, both White and Black Bomberman set out to rescue their friends and stop Bagura alongside Atomic Bomber, a new creation under his command. The game bears similarity with Super Bomberman 4 for Super Nintendo Entertainment System, as it was developed by most of the same team.

== Gameplay ==
Gameplay screenshot of the first stage from the first world

Neo Bomberman is an action-maze game that plays similarly like other games in the Bomberman franchise. In this, players take control of the titular characters with the main objective of destroying all of the monsters filling the playfield by placing bombs. Beating all the monsters will open a level's gate and lead players to the next area.

To aid in destroying monsters, players can bomb Soft Blocks which may uncover useful items. Such items include things which increase the amount of bombs that can be placed at one time, the range or the bomb explosions, or speed. There are also items for passing through Soft Blocks and bombs, for kicking and throwing bombs, and to make bombs remote controlled or pierce multiple blocks at once. Later levels introduces more elements such as rescuing other Bomberman characters – who will then aid the player for the rest of the level – and enemies that can be ridden or driven after defeating them.

The game allows up to two players to play through the single-player campaign cooperatively, but like most other entries, there is also a battle mode. In battle mode, a player can select one of ten different characters and face off against up to three computer-controlled opponents for five rounds in four different arenas. Like the story mode, the player can destroy Soft Blocks to uncover items to help them along. Should a second player join in, the game will switch to a one-on-one battle mode and the winner of the match will continue the game from there.

== Development and release ==
Neo Bomberman was developed by Produce!, who previously worked on three titles of the Super Bomberman sub-series for Super NES, while two ADS employees collaborated in creating artwork for the game. Although music composers for the game were not credited, Now Production were listed for making both its music and sound effects. The game was first showcased to the audience attending the Japan Amusement Machine and Marketing Association (JAMMA) trade fair in September 1996, along with other then-upcoming Neo Geo titles such as Kizuna Encounter and Samurai Shodown IV, in addition of the Amusement Machine Show and the Amusement & Music Operators Association Show (AMOA) held on the same year. It was released for the Neo Geo MVS in arcades by Hudson Soft on May 1, 1997, however it never received a conversion for the Neo Geo AES and Neo Geo CD. When played on a European system, the text is displayed in Spanish instead of English.

== Reception ==
Reception

Review score
| Publication | Score |
|---|---|
| AllGame | 4/5 |

When reviewing Neo Bomberman, Kyle Knight of AllGame praised its colorful visuals, tried-and-true addictive gameplay and sound design, among other aspects and regarding it as a welcomed addition to the library of games on the Neo Geo.
