= Bomberman Story DS =

2007 video game

- Developer: Amble
- Publishers: JP: Hudson Soft; PAL: Rising Star Games
- Series: Bomberman
- Platform: Nintendo DS
- Release: JP: March 21, 2007; AU: November 22, 2007; EU: November 23, 2007
- Genres: Puzzle, action role-playing
- Modes: Single-player, multiplayer

Bomberman Story DS (ボンバーマンストーリーDS, Bonbāman Sutōrī DS) is a 2007 puzzle action role-playing video game for the Nintendo DS. It was announced at the Nintendo Conference 2005. It was able to connect to the Nintendo Wi-Fi connection service. This game has received translations into several languages including English for releases in Europe and Australia by Rising Star Games.

== Story ==
Bomberman is a special agent, hired by "The Justice Department" to retrieve some stolen scientific data. It was later discovered that Professor Xeal and "The Lords of the Galaxy" were involved in the loss of this data, and so Bomberman begins his latest journey.

== Multiplayer ==
The game allows connecting to other Bomberman games in multiplayer mode. The Japanese version of the game contained the "Battle Pack 1" version of the traditional Battle Mode, which allowed connecting to Bomberman Land Touch!. The European version doubled in ROM size (from 64 to 128MB) and was updated with "Battle Pack 2," which allowed connecting to the newer Bomberman Land Touch! 2 and Bomberman 2. Rising Star's web site still mistakenly states that Bomberman Story DS players can connect with Bomberman Land Touch!.

Rising Star's site also states that Bomberman Story DS can utilize the Nintendo Wi-Fi Connection for up to 8 players, although in the game WiFi is only for up to 4 players, as with Bomberman Land Touch!.

== Reception ==
Reception

Aggregate score
Aggregator	Score
Metacritic	63/100

Review scores
Publication	Score
Consoles +	11/20
Eurogamer	6/10
Famitsu	27/40
Gamekult	5/10
GamesMaster	70%
GameSpot	6/10
Nintendo Life	7/10
Official Nintendo Magazine	62%
Pocket Gamer	3.5/5
VideoGamer.com	7/10

The game received "mixed" reviews according to the review aggregation website Metacritic. In Japan, Famitsu gave it a score of 27 out of 40.
