= Bomberman: Act Zero =

2006 video game

- Developer: Hudson Soft
- Publishers: JP: Hudson Soft; WW: Konami
- Series: Bomberman
- Platform: Xbox 360
- Release: JP: August 3, 2006; NA: August 29, 2006; EU: November 3, 2006; AU: November 10, 2006
- Genre: Maze
- Modes: Single-player, multiplayer

Bomberman: Act Zero (Note: Japanese: ボンバーマン Act：Zero, Hepburn: Bonbāman Act : Zero) is a maze video game developed by Hudson Soft for the Xbox 360 in 2006 and published by Hudson Soft in Japan and Konami worldwide. It is noteworthy for its departure from standard titles in the Bomberman series; it features more realistic graphics and a dark, dystopian future setting.

The game was released on August 29, 2006 in North America. It received generally negative reviews from critics and fans who criticized its gameplay, loading times, high difficulty, lack of checkpoints, soundtrack, realistic graphics, and darker tone compared to the rest of the series. It is often considered a low-point in the Bomberman series in retrospect and was featured on lists of the worst video games ever made.

== Gameplay ==
Players, as Bombermen, must destroy each other to fight their way to the surface of the Earth and escape. Players can customize their character including their gender. The game is viewed from an overhead perspective, like other Bomberman titles. The levels have a number of pillars throughout that require players' characters to navigate down hallways; there are sometimes obstacles in these paths that can only be destroyed by bombs. The bombs are also necessary to defeat opponents. An alternate mode called "First-Person Battle" allows players to view the action from behind the player character and are able to maneuver the camera. In the standard mode, the Bomberman can be killed by a single bomb (including their own); in FPB mode, they are given a life meter and can take multiple hits. In both modes, the Bombermen can pick up different power-ups (including speed, bomb count, bomb strength, and bomb duration). Both modes last for 99 floors; if the player-character dies, players must restart from the beginning. The game features an online-only battle mode called "world battle" which supports up to eight players.

== Development ==
The game was first announced by Hudson Soft at the Tokyo Game Show 2005 with a brief teaser trailer showing off the redesigned Bomberman. At E3 2006, Konami announced they would be publishing the game at their press conference. In November 2006, a mobile phone version, titled Bomberman: Act Zero Mobile Type, was released for i-Mobile phones exclusively in Japan.

== Reception ==
=== Pre-release ===
GameSpot's Justin Calvert played a single-player demo of the game at E3 2006. He noted that the gameplay was "largely unchanged" from classic Bomberman titles.

=== Post-release ===
Reception

Aggregate score
Aggregator	Score
Metacritic	34/100

Review scores
Publication	Score
Edge	3/10
Electronic Gaming Monthly	2.67/10 (Note: Two critics of Electronic Gaming Monthly gave the game each a score of 3/10, and the other gave it 2/10.)
Famitsu	(X360) 30/40; 23/40
Game Informer	3/10
GameSpot	2.9/10
GameSpy	1.5/5
GameTrailers	3.5/10
GameZone	3/10
IGN	3/10
Official Xbox Magazine (US)	4/10
TeamXbox	4.4/10
X-Play	1/5
Detroit Free Press	1/4

Bomberman: Act Zero received "unfavorable" reviews according to the review aggregation website Metacritic. In Japan, Famitsu gave it a score of 23 out of 40, while Famitsu Xbox 360 gave it a score of two eights and two sevens for a total of 30 out of 40.

The game was criticized for its long loading times, bad collision detection, forgettable soundtrack, use of the same textures and graphics for every stage, tedious and repetitive gameplay, lack of a save feature, unbalanced A.I. and the series' unwelcome shift to a darker and more futuristic setting. The First-Person Bomberman mode was also criticized for its bad camera angles and the fact that it is played in a third-person perspective rather than a first-person perspective. GamePro's Patrick Shaw felt that it shouldn't be used to introduce players to the series and that fans of the games should skip it. (Note: GamePro gave the game three 3/5 scores for graphics, sound, and control, and 2/5 for fun factor.) In the March 2007 issue of Electronic Gaming Monthly, Seanbaby listed the game as one of the Official Worst-Selling Games of 2006, describing it as "The Bomberman that sucks."

The game has been named one of the worst video games of all time by GamesRadar+ and The Guardian. In 2010, GameTrailers ranked the game at number one on their list of the "Top 10 Worst Sequels". Hudson Soft themselves expressed negative opinions on the game during a video for Bomberman Live.
