= Online Bomberman =

2003 video game

Bomberman Online
- A typical gameplay scene
- Developers: Hudson Soft; MGAME Corporation
- Publishers: Hudson Soft (Japan); Wizgate (South Korea); Fullerton (Taiwan)
- Series: Bomberman
- Platform: Microsoft Windows
- Release: 2003
- Genres: Massively multiplayer online game, maze
- Mode: Multiplayer

Online Bomberman was a 2003 online game of the Bomberman franchise developed by MGAME Corporation and Hudson Soft, and was released for Microsoft Windows in Japan, South Korea, Taiwan, Hong Kong and Macau. All servers have been permanently shut down. However, there is a fan-based version.

== Development ==
In early 2003, after the beta-testing phase, Bomberman Online was shut down in Japan. The official website stated that the game was stopped for debugging and was in development for a commercial release.

The Taiwan server supported Taiwan, Hong Kong and Macau regions, however on November 1, 2005, the game went out of business in those regions. In October 2005, The Taiwan, Hong Kong, and Macau site announced that they were closing the websites and all the servers involved with the game. This announcement caused a wave of shock amongst many players in that region. In response, several users in the forums declared that they will attempt to clone the game and setup private servers with no moderators or administrators doing anything to stop it. The result became Bomberman Online International.

The Japanese version went back online on December 1, 2005, but then closed again on July 31, 2007.

== Gameplay ==
There were four gameplay modes in Online Bomberman: 'Survival Mode', 'Panel Paint Mode', 'Hyperbomb Mode', and 'Boss Battle Mode'.

In Survival Rule, you either battle in a team or by yourself. You must kill all opposing players in order to win.

In Panel Paint Mode, the floor is colored. When your bomb explodes, the floor will be covered with your team color. When you die you will be revived but the area you had 'occupied' will be erased.

In Hyperbomb Mode, there are special hyperbomb items that you have to collect in order to win. There are 5 items in total. However, you only need to collect 3 then reach the center of the room in order to win. The difficult part in this game setting is that sometimes you must choose between letting your character die or losing all of your collected items.

In Dropbomb Mode, the objective is to avoid the bombs falling on the field and survive until the last moment. The player cannot place bombs and can disturb enemies while avoiding bombs using only items generated in the field. It was later changed to Boss Survival mode.

In Boss Survival Mode, the player will face a boss of their choice. The boss will place special bombs and hide. To fight the boss, the player can purchase items and use them for special effects. In the Korean version, this is called the Boss Battle Mode.

There have been 2 other buttons found in the game's data with the text 'Submarine Mode' and 'Ring Match'; the two have never taken place in the releases.

=== Item shop ===
In late 2004, Bomberman Online in Taiwan and Hong Kong opened an item shop where players could buy items for the boss battle mode including character cards and nickname cards. The former are characters that require a cash payment, and can only be used for a short period of time. There were two kinds of nickname cards. One type will affect the background of the nickname display, the other one will simply change the color of the text. Both of the items affect the player's name display. In order to buy items, the user must obtain Bomberyen. Bomberyen can be obtained through normal gameplay, by defeating bosses in Boss Survival Mode, by entering Tournaments, or by purchasing it with cash. Item shop also existed in the new version of the Japanese Bomberman Online, containing clothing and accessories to be used by a custom character in the game.

== Net de Bomberman ==
Net de Bomberman
- Developer: MGAME Corporation
- Publisher: Hudson Soft
- Series: Bomberman
- Platform: PlayStation 2
- Release: February 19, 2004
- Genres: Massively multiplayer online game, party
- Mode: Multiplayer

In 2004, Bomberman Online got ported to the PlayStation 2 in Japan only as Net de Bomberman. Unlike the US-only Dreamcast release, it is completely designed around its (now defunct) subscription-based online multiplayer, without any support for offline play. Only playable online, the game features ten different maps, based on the grid-like mazes seen in classic Bomberman titles. Accompanied by up to seven other players, the player has to collect items and kill enemies in order to unlock new stages. Players were able to communicate with other players through online chat.

From November 2003 to February 2004, the game could be played as a free pre-launch test. After the time frame ended, the service required a monthly payment of ¥500 (tax excluded). In 2008, this service was discontinued.

== Bomberman Online Japan ==
Bomberman Online Japan
- Developer: Hudson Soft
- Publisher: Hudson Soft
- Series: Bomberman
- Platform: Windows XP
- Release: May 21, 2008 – May 27, 2008 (closed beta); September 10, 2008 (public service open)
- Genres: Massively multiplayer online game, party
- Mode: Multiplayer

Bomberman Online Japan (ボンバーマンオンライン Japan) is the successor of Bomberman Online. The software uses Shockwave Entertainment, Inc.'s 55Shock! online service. It was released on PC in Japan only.

Player obtains experience points during battle. Each player has a bomb waza bar. When the bar is full, it refills the bomb waza gauge. When the gauge is full, player can use a bomb technique. Items collected in a course can be saved for later use. As part of the service launch, between September 10, 2008, and October 14, 2008, players could obtain weapons like pippocon hammer, lightning blade and dekadeka milk bomb by creating save data.

On December 26, 2008, Bomberman Online Japan's paid service was temporarily interrupted. On January 31, 2009, Shockwave Entertainment had terminated its online service, which also affected Bomberman Online Japan. As a result, the paid subscribers were refunded. On May 27, 2009, Hudson Soft's official site post an announcement that the service would end on June 3, 2009.
