= Super Bomberman Collection =

2026 video game compilation

- Developer: Red Art Games
- Publisher: Konami
- Director: Tatsunori Matsuo
- Producer: Kyo Takashimizu
- Artist: Tsubasa Haguri
- Series: Bomberman
- Platforms: Nintendo Switch; Nintendo Switch 2; PlayStation 5; Windows; Xbox Series X/S
- Release: WW: February 5, 2026
- Genres: Action, maze, party
- Modes: Single-player, multiplayer

Super Bomberman Collection (Note: Japanese: スーパーボンバーマン コレクション, Hepburn: Sūpā Bonbāman Korekushon) is a 2026 video game compilation developed by Red Art Games and published by Konami. It compiles eight (Note: Originally only seven games were included, before an eighth game was added via a free game update.) entries in the Bomberman game series, originally published by Hudson Soft prior to their acquisition by Konami in 2011, with a primary focus on the Super Bomberman subseries. The collection was shadow dropped on February 5, 2026, for Nintendo Switch, Nintendo Switch 2, PlayStation 5, Windows, and Xbox Series X/S to positive critical reception.

== Features ==
Super Bomberman Collection includes the five Super Bomberman games originally released for Super Nintendo Entertainment System (SNES): Super Bomberman (1993), Super Bomberman 2 (1994), Super Bomberman 3 (1995), Super Bomberman 4 (1996), and Super Bomberman 5 (1997). A sixth SNES game, the puzzle game spin-off Super Bomberman: Panic Bomber W (1995), was added in a free update. It also includes two bonus NES games, Bomberman (1985) and Bomberman II (1991), for a total of eight games. The SNES games are playable in both Japanese and English; Super Bomberman 4, 5, and Panic Bomber W, which were never released outside of Japan, were localized into English for the first time for this release. Players can create save states and rewind gameplay in any of the games. A boss rush mode for each of the Super Bomberman games challenges players to defeat all of that game's bosses in the shortest total time with limited lives.

The collection allows players to configure the screen resolution for each game, as well as enable optional filters and borders. Players can "unbox" 3D recreations of each SNES game's box art and cartridges from each region, as well as read their original instruction manuals. A "BOMB Radio" option allows players to listen to each game's soundtrack and create custom playlists, and a gallery menu includes over 200 images, including artwork and behind the scenes materials. All six SNES games support multiplayer for up to four players, expanded to five players in Super Bomberman 3–5, with the Nintendo Switch 2 version supporting single-copy multiplayer via the system's GameShare function.

== Release ==
Super Bomberman Collection was announced during a Nintendo Direct Partner Showcase livestream on February 5, 2026, and was released digitally for Nintendo Switch, Nintendo Switch 2, PlayStation 5, Windows, and Xbox Series X/S after the conclusion of the presentation. A free update on August 20 added Super Bomberman: Panic Bomber W to the collection. A physical release of the compilation is scheduled to follow on August 25, and includes Panic Bomber W in all versions except on Nintendo Switch. In addition to the standard physical edition, the game will also be available in deluxe and collector's editions containing additional physical goods.

== Reception ==
Reception

Aggregate scores
Aggregator	Score
Metacritic	84/100 (NS2); 84/100 (PC); 85/100 (PS5)
OpenCritic	93% recommend (Note: Based on 29 reviews)

Review scores
Publication	Score
Hardcore Gamer	3.5/5
Nintendo Life	8/10
Nintendo World Report	9/10
Retro Gamer	70%
Shacknews	8/10
CG Magazine	9/10

Super Bomberman Collection received generally favorable reviews from critics, according to the review aggregation website Metacritic. Fellow review aggregator OpenCritic assessed that the game received "mighty" approval, being recommended by 93% of critics.

Retro Gamer called the collection "generally very good", but criticized the lack of online multiplayer options.
