= New Atomic Punk: Global Quest =

1992 video game

- Developer: Irem
- Publisher: Irem
- Series: Bomberman
- Platform: Arcade
- Release: JP: June 1992; NA: September 1992; EU: 1992
- Genres: Action, maze
- Modes: Single-player; Multiplayer
- Arcade system: Irem M-97

New Atomic Punk: Global Quest (Note: Known in Japan as Bomber Man World (ボンバーマンワールド, Bonbā Man Wārudo) and New DynaBlaster: Global Quest in Europe) is a 1992 video game released by Irem under license from Hudson Soft for arcades. It is part of the Bomberman series. It was the second Bomberman game to be released for arcades, preceded by Bomberman (1991), which was also released by Irem.

The North American version is called Atomic Punk 2, but it shows the text New Atomic Punk - Global Quest in-game.

== Gameplay ==
Gameplay screenshot

When all enemies are destroyed the player automatically goes to the next stage. Items are lost after each stage, reducing the inventory to one bomb, and the default blast radius and walking speed. There are six worlds with six levels in each; after every fifth level there is a Bonus Stage, wherein soft blocks contain many points items and power ups.

== Plot ==
King Bomber, the antagonist from Bomberman (arcade), has returned and has taken over the UN building with his armies of evil robots. The 4 Bomberman Bros. must now defeat him.

== Reception ==
Reception

Review scores
Publication	Score
GameZone	4.5/5
Sinclair User	76%
Zero	4.5/5

In Japan, Game Machine listed Bomber Man World on their July 15, 1992 issue as being the tenth most-successful table arcade unit of the month, outperforming titles such as King of the Monsters 2 and Football Frenzy. In North America, RePlay reported in the game to be the eighth most-popular arcade game of the month in October 1992. Play Meter also listed the title to be the forty-sixth most-popular arcade game at the time.

The game received positive reviews from critics. Gary Harrod of British magazine Sinclair User praised the visuals and gameplay, stating that "this may be a simple formula game but it's still good fun to play". Andreas Knauf of German magazine Video Games gave the title a positive outlook. GamesMaster gave it a mixed outlook.
