= Bomberman 64 (2001 video game) =

- Cover art
- Developer: Racjin
- Publisher: Hudson Soft
- Directors: Hideki Yayama; Takeshi Murata; Yasuyuki Kido
- Producer: Toshinori Oyama
- Designer: Masaki Oka
- Programmer: Kazuyuki Takata
- Artist: Shoji Mizuno
- Composer: Morihiro Iwamoto
- Series: Bomberman
- Platform: Nintendo 64
- Release: JP: December 20, 2001
- Genre: Action
- Modes: Single-player, multiplayer

Bomberman 64 (ボンバーマン64, Bonbāman Rokujūyon) is a Nintendo 64 game released only in Japan in 2001. It was the final Nintendo 64 game to be released in Japan. The game features four distinct gameplay modes, each with unique gameplay, based on different games in the Bomberman franchise.

== Gameplay ==
Unlike previous Bomberman games on the system, Bomberman 64 is fully 2D without any 3D graphics. It includes four different game modes, each of which features a different gameplay style:

"Bomberman" features traditional Bomberman gameplay, particularly based on that seen in the Super Bomberman titles on SNES. As in past games, players control Bomberman, moving around a grid and using bombs to destroy obstructions and defeat enemies while collecting powerups and looking for an exit; once found, all enemies must be defeated for the exit to be used. The player must complete a sequence of 10 consecutive stages, culminating in a boss battle. Unlike previous games, stages each feature two exits; choosing different exits will determine which stage the player will enter next along a series of branching routes, as well as which boss the player will battle in the final stage. The mode also includes a "Battle Royale" multiplayer mode, in which up to four players compete to be the last one standing. Available multiplayer rules include "Solo Battle", with players competing individually; "Team Battle", which divides players into teams of two; and "Tandem Battle", a co-operative game type where one player controls the characters' movement while the other controls bomb placement.

"Panic Bomber" is based on the 1994 Bomberman spinoff of the same name, a puzzle game in which players attempt to match falling blocks of the same color in order to create bombs to clear the tiles on their screen and damage opponents. The mode features a single player score attack mode, and a four player battle royale mode.

"SameGame" is based on the 1985 game of the same name, a single-player tile-matching puzzle game in which players must select adjacent tiles of the same color to clear them from a grid, attempting to get the highest score possible without running out of moves.

"Bomberman Park" is a single-player mode based on Bomberman Land (2000). Similar to that game, players explore an amusement park and participate in several minigames. By earning high scores in each of the minigames, players will earn medals that grant access to additional areas of the park with their own minigames. Several of the minigames are ported directly from Bomberman Land and Bomberman Land 2.

== Release and reception ==
Reception

Review score
Publication	Score
Famitsu	7/10, 6/10, 6/10, 7/10

Bomberman 64 was described as a "culmination" of the Bomberman series up to that point, intended to offer a sample of the different gameplay styles featured in the series and its spinoffs over the previous 16 years. The game was released on December 20, 2001, making it the final game released for the Nintendo 64 in Japan.

It is often confused with the 1997 game Bomberman 64, which was released in Japan as Baku Bomberman.
