= Bomberman Hero =

1998 video game

- North American Nintendo 64 cover art
- Developers: A.I Co., Ltd
- Publishers: JP: Hudson Soft; WW: Nintendo
- Director: Naruhiro Matsumoto
- Producer: Hidetoshi Endo
- Designers: Hideyuki Kubota; Katsumi Miyashita; Norio Ookubo
- Artists: Shoji Mizuno; Kozue Narai
- Composer: Jun Chikuma
- Series: Bomberman
- Platform: Nintendo 64
- Release: JP: April 30, 1998; NA: August 31, 1998; EU: October 23, 1998
- Genre: Platform
- Mode: Single-player

Bomberman Hero (Note: Japanese: ボンバーマンヒーロー ～ミリアン王女を救すくえ!～, Hepburn: Bonbāman Hīrō ~Mirian-Ōjo o Sukue!~; Bomberman Hero: Rescue Princess Millian!) is a platform video game developed by A.I Co., Ltd. and published by Hudson Soft for the Nintendo 64. It is the second Bomberman game to be released on the system, following Bomberman 64 (1997). It is notable for being a dramatic deviation from previous Bomberman titles, featuring predominant platforming gameplay as opposed to the series' traditional top-down strategy gameplay.

Bomberman Hero received mixed reviews from critics, who criticized it for its graphics and absence of a multiplayer mode, though elements of its gameplay were praised. It was re-released through the Wii Virtual Console service in 2011.

== Gameplay ==
Bomberman Hero controls very differently from Bomberman 64: the titular player character can jump, has a life meter, and has the ability to throw bombs further, thus making it a more platform-oriented experience. There are 14 different areas spread out across six planets (including one secret planet). Each area contains five to seven different stages. Alongside the usual platforming gameplay, Bomberman Hero features multiple "Power Gears" which causes different gameplay styles: the "Bomber Marine" gear features in underwater stages that Bomberman must swim through to the end; "Bomber Jet" features in rail shooting stages; "Bomber Copter" allows Bomberman to fly above the stage; and levels with "Bomber Slider" are snowboarding sections.

There are several different types of bombs in addition to the regular ones. Ice bombs turn enemies into a block of ice that can be moved around and used to jump onto to get to higher places. Salt bombs can harm slugs, which are invulnerable to all other weapons, but cannot harm any other enemy. Remote control bombs explode when remotely detonated. Every bomb type explodes automatically upon collision with an enemy or other stage object.

Most stages contain several several collectables and enemies which, when collected and destroyed respectively, adds a certain amount to the player's score. Every stage in the game features a score target, usually achieved by picking up every collectable in the stage and destroying every enemy, or in the case of boss stages, defeating the boss as fast as possible. After the stage, the player is given a certain number of stage points (1 through 5) based on how close their final score was to the score target. Medals are awarded on a per-planet basis, based on the total number of stage points gained upon the planet's completion (red, blue, bronze, silver, and gold). Getting a perfect score on every planet (i.e. a gold medal on each one) will grant the player access to a short bonus stage for extra power-ups, gems and lives.

== Plot ==
The world of Primus Star is attacked by the evil Garaden Empire. The world's leader, Princess Millian, steals a secret data disk and safely smuggles it out through her robot servant Pibot before being captured. On Planet Bomber, Bomberman is training in his Bomber Base headquarters when Pibot's shuttle crash-lands outside. Investigating the crash, Bomberman learns from Pibot about the princess's capture, and agrees to rescue her.

Bomberman travels through four worlds: Planet Bomber, Primus Star, Kanatia Star, and Mazone Star. During the journey, Bomberman repeatedly encounters Nitros, a mysterious Garaden soldier resembling Bomberman. For the first three worlds, Bomberman chases after Princess Millian only to find that she has been transported to the next world. Each time, Bomberman is forced to battle one of the Four Devils of Garaden, the Empire's strongest soldiers. While on Mazone, Bomberman finds Princess Millian safe in a laboratory, who tells him to retrieve the rest of the disks. After giving the disks to Princess Millian, she reveals herself as Natia, the last of the Big Four, and sends the disks to the Garaden base. After Bomberman defeats Natia and frees the real Princess Millian, he sets out towards Garaden Star.

At Garaden Star, Nitros uses the disks to resurrect the Empire's leader, Bagular, whose body was previously destroyed by Bomberman. (Note: As depicted in Super Bomberman 3 (1995).) Bomberman has a final encounter with Nitros, who reveals he was a Bomber Base trainee who had been brainwashed by the Empire until Bomberman freed him in their battle, and offers his power to Bomberman. Bomberman confronts and defeats Bagular, who self-destructs Garaden Star in an attempt to kill Bomberman. Bomberman escapes the explosion and returns to Primus Star, where Princess Millian rewards him for his heroism.

If a perfect score is achieved on every level and all the Adok bombs are collected, Evil Bomber appears on a splinter of the planet Owen, now renamed Gossick Star, seeking revenge on Bomberman for his previous defeat. (Note: As depicted in Bomberman GB 3 (1996).) After successfully defeating Evil Bomber, Bomberman is congratulated by Princess Millian and the Black Bombers as they all fly home.

== Development ==
Bomberman Hero was originally planned as an entry in the Bonk/PC Kid series known as Ultra Genjin, before being cancelled and repurposed as a Bomberman game.

It is known for its drum and bass and acid techno soundtrack, composed by Jun Chikuma. She went on to say that Bomberman Hero was "the most remarkable title in terms of music among the Bomberman series".

== Reception ==
Reception

Aggregate score
Aggregator	Score
GameRankings	58%

Review scores
Publication	Score
AllGame	2.5/5
Edge	6/10
GamePro	11/20
GameRevolution	D
GameSpot	6.7/10
IGN	6/10
N64 Magazine	66% (JP); 66% (UK)

Bomberman Hero received generally mixed reviews. GameSpot said, "Despite the uninspired plotline, Bomberman Hero is a rather surprising success. In a departure from Bomberman 64, Bomberman Hero boasts a number of new gameplay features that make this a completely new Bomberman game." In a mixed review, IGN heavily criticized the lack of multiplayer mode, stating, "Nintendo and Hudson serve up a decidedly average 3D Bomberman sequel -- without a multiplayer mode." Multiple outlets noted the plot's heavy similarity to that of Star Wars (1977).

Edge criticized the graphics for featuring intrusive distance fog and the same texture pattern, which make it difficult for the player to judge depth. However, the magazine concluded that, as a Japanese platformer, the game should not be overlooked, and favorably compared its rewarding exploration with Yoshi's Island.

The game was re-released with the Player's Choice marketing label, indicating sales of at least one million units.
