= Bomberman Live: Battlefest =

2010 video game

- Developer: Pi Studios
- Publisher: Hudson Soft
- Composers: Filippo Beck Peccoz; Disasterpeace
- Series: Bomberman
- Platform: Xbox 360
- Release: December 8, 2010
- Genre: Action
- Modes: Single-player, multiplayer

Bomberman Live: Battlefest is a 2010 video game for the Xbox 360 console. It was developed by Pi Studios, published by Hudson Soft, and released on December 8, 2010 through Xbox Live Arcade.

Part of the Bomberman franchise, it is the successor to 2007's Bomberman Live, and was the final console entry published by Hudson Soft before its acquisition and subsequent dissolution by Konami.

== Gameplay ==
The gameplay follows the traditional Bomberman gameplay. Players must use bombs to blow up and defeat other players. The players must blow up bricks that stand in the way to make way to access other players. Blowing up bricks will give power ups such as increased speed or blast length. The last person standing in each round is the winner. If no players remain, a draw is declared.

=== Multiplayer ===
Bomberman Live: Battlefest includes up to eight people online along with teams. It has several modes and power ups, arenas, as well as Xbox Live Arcade Avatar support.

== Reception ==
Reception

Aggregate score
Aggregator	Score
Metacritic	70/100

Review scores
Publication	Score
Eurogamer	8/10
GameSpot	6.5/10
GameZone	6/10
IGN	8/10
Official Xbox Magazine (UK)	6/10
Official Xbox Magazine (US)	6.5/10
PALGN	7/10

The game received "mixed or average reviews" according to the review aggregation website Metacritic. GameSpot said, "Battlefest isn't bad. It's just unnecessary." IGN called it "a great change of pace, especially when you've got a group of friends together in real life."

== See also ==
- List of Bomberman video games
