= Bomberman Online =

2001 video game

- Developers: h.a.n.d., Hudson Soft
- Publisher: Sega
- Director: Kaname Fujii
- Producer: Hiroshi Igari
- Designer: Koji Yamamoto
- Programmers: Katsuhiko Kii; Kazuharu Humoto; Kazuhiko Sugiyama
- Artists: Akihiro Takanami; Naoto Yoshimi; Shoji Mizuno
- Composers: Hironao Yamamoto; Shohei Bando
- Series: Bomberman
- Platform: Dreamcast
- Release: NA: 30 October 2001
- Genres: Action, maze, party
- Modes: Single-player, multiplayer

Bomberman Online is a multiplayer video game developed for the Dreamcast console platform. The game is part of the Bomberman franchise and includes various multiplayer game modes. The game's online servers were shut down in 2003, restricting players to offline-only multiplayer modes.

== Gameplay ==
The gameplay of Bomberman Online consists of combat in a maze, using stationary timed explosives to attack and cause destruction to the map. Bomberman Online has multiple game modes:

=== Multiplayer game modes ===
==== Survival Rule ====
The original Bomberman battle mode in which the last player standing wins. This mode is played when fighting against the Electric Dragons. The boss of this stadium is Thunder Bomber.

==== Hyper Bomber Rule ====
A newer addition to the Bomberman series, where the objective is to collect 3 target panel power-ups, and navigate to the centre of the map. A large explosion then eliminates everything except the player. A skull circles the player for each target panel collected. All of the target panels are lost upon death. This mode is played when fighting against the Red Phoenix. The bosses of this stadium are the Bomber Brothers.

Battle gameplay screenshot

==== Submarine Rule ====
This game is almost identical to Battleship, except that it occurs in real time. In gameplay, the player places a bomb with a timer, which will move to the adjacent spot on the other side once the timer runs out. The mode is played when fighting against the Princess Mariners. The boss of this stadium is Bomber Mermaid.

==== Panel Paint Rule ====
The objective of this mode is to colour as many squares as possible. Squares can only be coloured by explosions caused by the player and will turn into the player's colour. All squares become brown upon death. This mode is played when fighting against the Iron Bulldozers. The boss of this stadium is Bomber Gun Rock.

==== Ring Match Rule ====
The goal here is to gain points by eliminating opponents, while avoiding being eliminated. If the player dies, they respawn back onto the playing field. This mode is played when fighting against the Storm Giants. The boss of this stadium is Aladdin Bomber.

== Synopsis ==
Bomberman enters the Bomblympics to retain his title as the hero of Planet Bomber. The Bomblympics pit its combatants in a series of trials against one another, with six contestants – Bomberman being one of them. The contestants must make it inside each of the other contestants' designated bases to set up their trials. Each contestant must run through the trials and make it to the contestant's throne room where in a duel they must attempt to defeat one another. The opposing contestants are the Electric Dragons, Red Phoenix, Princess Mariners, Iron Bulldozers and the Storm Giants. Being the current hero of Planet Bomber, Bomberman gets the chance to go first, and he makes his way through each of the other five bases of the other contestants, winning every time. None of the other contestants are ever even given a chance to compete because of Bomberman's skill. In the end, Bomberman wins the Bomblympics and retains his championship title of the hero of Planet Bomber.

== Reception ==
Reception

Aggregate score
Aggregator	Score
Metacritic	80/100

Review scores
Publication	Score
Electronic Gaming Monthly	8.33/10 (Note: Two critics of Electronic Gaming Monthly gave the game each a score of 8.5/10, and the other gave it 8/10.)
EP Daily	8/10
Game Informer	8.5/10
GameRevolution	B
GameSpot	6.9/10
GameSpy	9/10
IGN	9/10

According to the review aggregation site Metacritic, Bomberman Online received "generally favorable reviews".
