= Atomic Bomberman =

1997 video game

- North American cover art
- Developer: Interplay Productions
- Publisher: Interplay Productions
- Designers: Jeremy Airey; Kurt W. Dekker
- Series: Bomberman
- Platform: Microsoft Windows
- Release: NA: July 21, 1997; EU: 1997
- Genres: Arcade, maze
- Modes: Single player, multiplayer

Atomic Bomberman is a game by Interplay Productions for the PC that was released in 1997. It was the first original Bomberman game to be developed for Windows, and the second game of the series made for the PC, following Bomberman.

The game is relatively unusual in the Bomberman series, as it was officially licensed from Hudson Soft and developed by Interplay Productions, a studio based in the United States. Most titles in the series were developed in Japan. It has a different look and feel compared to other Bomberman titles as a result (despite basic gameplay being unchanged), using pre-rendered 3D characters and backgrounds as opposed to hand-drawn animated sprites, and extensive use of voice samples by voice actors Charlie Adler and Billy West during gameplay.

== Gameplay ==
Gameplay screenshot

Atomic Bomberman can be played in either "classic" or "enhanced" mode. Ten players maximum can be selected. However, at least one must be controlled by the player, and no more than one player can be controlled by the same keyboard layout on the same computer. This keyboard map rule does not apply to local network games. Unlike previous Bomberman games, Atomic Bomberman has no story or plotline.

== Level editor ==
The game includes a hidden level editor which allows the player to edit existing maps as well as create new maps. Maps used by the game are in the form of "scheme files" (.sch filename extension). The map editor is a simple interface, showing the map, dotted with different colors (0 to 9) to represent player spawns. A function called DENSITY chooses how "dense" the collection of breakable items is. The Powerup Manager chooses the list of powerups to be included, how often they spawn, whether they can be destroyed and what happens when two conflicting powers are picked (such as Bomb Spooge vs. Power Glove). The editor also sports a basic graphic interface: the player can switch between the "Green Acres" theme and a monochrome, patterned representation.

== Development ==
Atomic Bomberman was built from the code for Super Bomberman 3, which publisher/developer Interplay Productions licensed from Bomberman franchise owner Hudson Soft. Project leader Jeremy Airey commented, "We're trying to make [Bomberman] a little more modern, but we don't need to change the way it plays at all."

The development team had ambitions of the game supporting twice as many players as any other version of the game, until the release of Saturn Bomberman (which supports up to ten players) made this goal unrealistic.

A PlayStation version was planned but never released.

Within the game's files are a set of unused profane voice clips recorded by the game's voice talent, Billy West and Charlie Adler, which are not heard in gameplay.

== Reception ==
Reception

Aggregate score
Aggregator	Score
GameRankings	68%

Review scores
Publication	Score
CNET Gamecenter	8/10
Computer Gaming World	3/5
Computer and Video Games	2/5
Edge	7/10
GameRevolution	4/10
GameSpot	5.7/10
PC Gamer (US)	75%
PC Zone	90/100
PCMag	4/5
Adrenaline Vault	3.5/5
PC Joker	65%
PC Player	4/5
Secret Service	4/10

Atomic Bomberman garnered mixed or average reviews, holding a 68.40% rating at the review aggregator site GameRankings. CNET Gamecenter's Hugh Falk found the gameplay faithful to the Super Bomberman series, commending Interplay Productions for not experimenting too much with it, while being fond of the game's graphics and sound. Falk noted its level designer and multiplayer for up to ten players, but saw the inability to chat during online play as an oversight. Pete Hines of the Adrenaline Vault gave positive remarks to the crisp and colorful visuals, the gameplay for being easy to play but hard to master, sound effects, musical score, and the opponent's AI, but felt mixed about the game's overall interface. GameSpot's Trent Ward commented that while the humorous death animations and customizable characters and rules are admirable additions to the series, the online multiplayer's jerky play and odd glitches greatly compromise the most important aspect of the game.

Edge also commended Interplay for translating the gameplay to PC, but expressed that it lost the "charm" of the 16-bit console iteration with its "over-detailed" sprites. PC Zone's Charlie Brooker agreed, stating that the character sprites' "American" makeover was less cute than the original Japanese sprites. Brooker regarded it to be an addictive multiplayer game. PCMag's Shane Mooney wrote that "If you're looking for a game that you and your friends can play to kill a few minutes (or hours, or days), Atomic Bomberman packs plenty of punch." GamePro's Dan Elektro said Atomic Bomberman "really preserves the classic series' essential elements and adds only worthwhile enhancements." Elektro particularly noted the team modes in online multiplayer, the level creator, and the well rendered characters, though he remarked that the backgrounds are sometimes overly detailed to the point of making the screen cluttered.

PC Gamer US' Lisa Renninger praised the game's fast-paced action and multiplayer, but criticized the memory amount it took on a hard drive, lack of an advancement system, and "ugly" playfields as drawbacks. PC Joker's Markus Ziegler commented about the game's controls in a positive light but expressed mixed thoughts regarding its audiovisual presentation. PC Player's Monika Stoschek pointed out the high difficulty when playing with computer opponents, stating that it could prove frustrating for beginners.

Galush of Polish magazine Secret Service was impressed with the graphical quality but was less pleased with its artstyle, internet connectivity, performance on certain machines and lack of single-player campaign. Computer Gaming World's Kelly Rickards saw the number of maps in multiplayer and power-ups as positives. Nevertheless, Rickards wrote that "This game bastardizes the series; much of the appeal and well-honed gameplay of the Japanese console games didn't make the boat ride over the Pacific." GameRevolution's Nebojsa Radakovic highlighted the game's multiplayer and sound effects, but panned its basic visuals, simple gameplay with no significant improvement, and level editing tools.
