= Bomberman Land 2 =

2003 video game

- PlayStation 2 cover art
- Developer: Racjin
- Publisher: Hudson Soft
- Series: Bomberman
- Platforms: PlayStation 2, GameCube
- Release: PlayStation 2: JP: July 17, 2003; GameCube: JP: July 31, 2003
- Genre: Party
- Modes: Single-player, multiplayer

Bomberman Land 2: The Biggest Theme Park in Game History (Note: Japanese: ボンバーマンランド2 ゲーム史上最大のテーマパーク, Hepburn: Bonbāman Rando 2 Gēmu Shijō Saidai no Tēma Pāku) is a 2003 video game developed by Racjin and published by Hudson Soft that was released in July for the PlayStation 2 and GameCube. Part of the Bomberman franchise, it is the sequel and the second game in the Bomberman Land series.

== Plot ==
One day, Bombermen were invited to the newly opened Bomberman Land theme park by the park manager. The player's goal is to collect 125 BOMPAD pieces obtained through the adventures inside the park.

== Gameplay ==
In addition to mini-games within the main story, there are other mini-games:

- Survival Bomberman - An action role-playing game
- Bomberman Kart - A subset of the Bomberman Kart video game
- Bomberman Battle - The multiplayer blasting action featured in most Bomberman titles. New game modes include Star battle mode, point battle mode
- SameGame - Bomberman-themed SameGame
- Panic Bomber - A variant of Super Bomberman Panic Bomber World. Up to 4 people can play at the same time

By using the GameCube – Game Boy Advance link cable, 10 mini-games can be downloaded and played on the Game Boy Advance.

== Promotion ==
To celebrate Bomberman Land 2's release, Hudson Soft scheduled Bomberman Land 2 competitions at five retail locations in Japan.

== Reception ==
The game received a score of 27/40 from Famitsu.
