= Bomberman Hardball =

2004 video game

- Developer(s): Hudson Soft
- Publisher(s): JP: Hudson Soft; EU: Ubisoft
- Series: Bomberman
- Engine: RenderWare
- Platform(s): PlayStation 2
- Release: JP: October 7, 2004; EU: July 1, 2005
- Genre(s): Party, puzzle
- Mode(s): Single-player, multiplayer

Bomberman Hardball (Bomberman Battles in Japan) is a video game for the PlayStation 2 which takes a departure from the previous games in the Bomberman series, and throws in sports games along with the traditional battle mode.

== Gameplay ==
Bomberman Hardball is divided into four games. Battle mode (the standard Bomberman game), is joined by tennis, golf and baseball games. At the center of all this is the Life mode, a character building feature in which the player can design a Bomberman for use in any of the battle modes.

=== Battle mode ===
Battle Mode is the centerpiece of this game, as with other Bomberman games. This mode is essentially the standard Bomberman formula, where players navigate grid-based mazes, planting bombs in an attempt to hit other players (while avoiding the bomb blasts). There are several different variations of Battle Mode, although they all center around the standard Bomberman gameplay.

- Classic Battle: A standard deathmatch-type game.
- Star Battle: Players try to collect stars scattered all over the arena.
- Crown Battle: Players race to get the crown on the opposite side of the arena.
- Point Battle: Players attempt to score points by killing opponents.
- Replay: Watched game sessions saved to memory card.

=== Baseball ===
Baseball has two modes: a single-match mode (exhibition) and a pennant race, the latter of which has the player take part in a league match of thirty games against five CPU teams. Aiming is automatic, causing most of the gameplay to revolve around well-timed button presses (baserunning is also automatic; fielding can even be set to be automatic).

=== Golf ===
Golf can either be played in exhibition mode or in a tournament mode, with a total of eighteen holes available. Like Mario Golf, shots are handled with a timer bar at the bottom of the screen. A vertical bar moves along the horizontal one; a button press stops the bar, determining the power of the shot. The bar then moves in the opposite direction, eventually passing a stationary bar. A second button press stops the moving bar again; the closer it is to the stationary bar, the more accurate (i.e. straight) the shot will be.

=== Tennis ===
Tennis has doubles and singles modes on clay, hard and grass courts. The player can play through an exhibition match, with settings for the number of sets and games, or play a tournament, playing against a series of CPU opponents.

=== Life ===
In Life mode, the player can raise a white Bomberman, who lives in his own house. Within the house are several interactive objects, including a television. To get to these interactive objects, you use the cellphone. The remote options are as follows:

Channel 1: Watch a battle. Channel 2: Watch some baseball. Channel 3: Watch some tennis. Channel 4: Watch some golf. Channel 5: Edit your Bomberman character. Channel 6: Go to the options menu. Channel 7: Display calendar. Channel 8: Name your Bomberman character. Channel 9: Buy things from the gumball machine.

The TV can be used to watch demos of matches (computer-only matches) from the game's different modes. There is also a gumball machine, which allows the player to spend 100 coins on things such as outfits for the player's Bomberman (coins are earned by playing the main game modes, and items are chosen at random). The player's customized Bomberman can be used in any battle mode.

== Reception ==
Reception

Review score
Publication	Score
4Players	90%
