= Bomberman Ultra =

2009 video game

- Developer: Hudson Soft
- Publisher: Hudson Soft
- Series: Bomberman
- Platform: PlayStation 3
- Release: NA: June 11, 2009; JP: June 18, 2009; PAL: September 17, 2009
- Genre: Action
- Mode: Multiplayer

Bomberman Ultra is a downloadable video game for the PlayStation 3, released in 2009 as part of the Bomberman franchise.

== Gameplay ==
The game gives players the ability to fully customize their own Bomberman. The full selection of outfits is immediately unlockable from the very start off the game, allowing for more than 150,000 unique combinations.

Players battling each other in an online match

== Release ==
Bomberman Ultra is a digital-only release. It was made available for purchase and download via the PlayStation Network digital storefront in 2009 in all regions.

== Reception ==
Reception

Aggregate score
Aggregator	Score
Metacritic	81/100

Review scores
Publication	Score
GamePro	4/5
GameZone	8.3/10
IGN	8/10
PlayStation Official Magazine – UK	8/10
Play	82%

Bomberman Ultra received "generally favorable reviews" according to the review aggregator Metacritic. IGN said, "A good deal at ten bucks, this is a download Bomberman fans will want to make room for."
