= Bomberman Kart =

2001 video game

- Bomberman Kart box art (European version)
- Developers: Racjin; Hudson Soft
- Publisher: Hudson Soft
- Series: Bomberman
- Platform: PlayStation 2
- Release: JP: December 20, 2001; EU: October 17, 2003; DX: JP: April 15, 2004
- Genre: Kart-racing
- Modes: Single-player, multiplayer

Bomberman Kart is a kart-racing video game for PlayStation 2 starring the Bomberman characters. It is similar to Nintendo's Mario Kart series. The game supports 4 player local multiplayer using the PlayStation 2 Multitap. The first version was released in 2001 in Japan and later in 2003 in Europe. The second version, called Bomberman Kart DX was released in 2004 only in Japan.

== Gameplay ==
In Bomberman Kart, the players can pick the characters separately from their vehicles. All power-ups are scattered around the track, including bombs, rockets (homing or wall bouncing ones) and boosts.

== Reception ==
Reception

Review score
Publication	Score
Jeuxvideo.com	6/20

== Bomberman Kart DX ==
Bomberman Kart DX is a redesigned version with improved graphics, new tracks, new racing modes and extras: manga artworks, a customizable traditional 4-player bomberman game and a 2-player co-op dungeon crawling adventure. The DX version removed the 4-player GP racing option and local multiplayer in this mode is now limited to 2 players. It also features downloadable content expansion packs adding more races (the PS2 HDD and Network Adaptor are required).
