= Super Bomberman 5 =

1997 video game

- Developer: Hudson Soft (Note: Additional work by ADS)
- Publisher: Hudson Soft
- Director: Tadashi Ozaki
- Producer: Masanori Wake
- Designer: Shin Sasaki
- Programmers: Hiroki Toyama; Masato Tobisawa; Mittu Takahashi
- Artists: Kozue Sato; Naoto Yoshimi; Shoji Mizuno
- Composers: Jun Chikuma; Yasuhiko Fukuda
- Series: Bomberman
- Platform: Super Famicom
- Release: JP: 28 February 1997
- Genres: Action, maze, party
- Modes: Single-player, multiplayer

Super Bomberman 5 (Note: Japanese: スーパーボンバーマン5, Hepburn: Sūpā Bonbāman Faibu) is a 1997 action maze video game developed and published by Hudson Soft. It is the fifth installment of the Super Bomberman series and the final Bomberman game to be released on the Super Famicom. The game was released in two variations: a standard cartridge and a gold cartridge, which was sold through CoroCoro Comic. The gold cartridge included extra maps in battle mode.

== Gameplay ==

Top: Story mode gameplay.
Bottom: Multiplayer battle mode.

The single-player portion of Super Bomberman 5 is nonlinear, giving players a choice of which level to complete next. These phases are all based on the four previous Super Bomberman games for the Super Famicom, containing remixed music and sprites from these games. The fifth phase, however, is completely new.

Depending on the path taken, the player can achieve 100% completion. There are two endings available, depending on where the final boss is encountered. After reaching 100% completion, the game map is reset, allowing players to achieve 200% completion.

In multiplayer, nine characters are initially available, as well as 10 maps. Eight of them are bosses in Normal mode. There's also a tenth secret one. The game presents a mode where the player can customize their character, including their color. It also grants them points that can be used to equip the power-up items from the Normal Mode.

== Plot ==
An evil Bomber called Emperor Terrorin desires to conquer the galaxy. He frees nine Fiendish Bombers from Bomber Prison, a set of cells in orbit around Planet Bomber. After Terrorin places them in warped time and space, White Bomber, Black Bomber, and their Louie (Rooey) companions must travel through stages and defeat them before confronting Emperor Terrorin himself.

== Development and release ==
While initially only released in Japanese, the game was localized into English for the first time in 2026 when it was re-released as part of the Super Bomberman Collection compilation.

== Reception ==
Reception

Review scores
Publication	Score
Jeuxvideo.com	18/20
Official Nintendo Magazine	81%
