= Bombergirl =

2018 video game

- Promotional art
- Developer: Konami
- Publisher: Konami
- Series: Bomberman
- Platforms: Arcade, Microsoft Windows
- Release: Arcade: JP: August 30, 2018; Microsoft Windows; JP: December 22, 2021
- Genre: MOBA
- Mode: Multiplayer

Bombergirl (Note: Japanese: ボンバーガール, Hepburn: Bonbāgāru) is a multiplayer online battle arena (MOBA) video game developed by Konami and released for Japanese arcades on August 30, 2018. A Microsoft Windows version was released in December 2021, but shifted from its Pay-to-Play subscription model to Free-to-Play in September 2022. It is a spin-off from the Bomberman series, and is played similarly to previous titles, with characters that are all humanoid girls depicted in a bishoujo moe visual style. Eight players are split into two teams of four, who aim to destroy the other team's base by placing bombs and using character-specific abilities.

== Gameplay ==
Bombergirl is played similarly to other Bomberman games. Two four-player teams play the game at a time and control one of several different characters, in matches where the goal is to destroy the other team's base. The players can place bombs, as well as use character-specific abilities; for instance, Shiro can place several bombs, Momoko can create blocks, Oren can move quickly, and Emera can use ranged attacks. Throughout the match, characters' levels are raised, allowing the player to use special attacks such as a beam sword and a flaming sword. After a match, characters on the losing team are displayed with their clothes burned apart in a comically sexual manner. The game also features various Konami crossover characters among its original cast, such as Grim Aloe from Quiz Magic Academy and Sephia Belmont, an original character inspired by Castlevania's "Belmont" protagonists.

== Development and release ==
Bombergirl was developed by Konami. The title was revealed at the Japan Amusement Expo in February 2017 as an arcade-exclusive game, and was playable at the event. The developers intended for the new game elements the game introduces to the series to make the game fun to watch in addition to fun to play.

A Microsoft Windows version was also developed. There were two beta tests in January and November. The game was released on December 22, 2021, for Konami Amusement Game Station service.

== Reception ==
Polygon described the game as "horny", similarly to their earlier game Otomedius, a Gradius-like shooting game where the player controls female characters rather than ships. Destructoid was positive to the prerelease footage, saying that they hoped it would be released in the West, and that they liked its cute aesthetic.
