= Bomberman Land Touch! =

2006 video game

- European cover art
- Developer: Hudson Soft
- Publishers: JP: Hudson Soft; NA/AU: Atlus USA; EU: Rising Star Games
- Series: Bomberman
- Platform: Nintendo DS
- Release: JP: July 20, 2006; NA: November 7, 2006; EU: March 23, 2007; AU: March 29, 2007
- Genre: Puzzle
- Modes: Single-player, multiplayer

Bomberman Land Touch! (Note: Known in Japan as Touch! Bomberman Land (Touch!ボンバーマンランド, Touch! Bonbāman Rando)) is a puzzle video game developed by Hudson Soft for the Nintendo DS. The game was first released in Japan and North America in 2006. Part of the Bomberman franchise, Touch! is the fourth game in the Bomberman Land series and its first to be released outside Japan.

== Plot ==
In the Story mode, the player takes the role of Cheerful White, who is invited by his friend Giant Gold, along with his other pals - Cute Pink, Cool Black, Bookworm Green and Kid Blue - to the Bomber Pirate Island. The Story mode itself revolves around a multi-themed theme-park, with caves, aquariums, and mountains that divide the five zones present in the game, and the constant theme for Cheerful White being to become the "Pirate King" of Bomber Pirate Island.

== Gameplay ==
=== Story mode ===
In the Story Mode, there are over 30 mini-games that must be completed throughout Bomber Pirate Island. As Cheerful White wins attractions, he acquires various Pieces (Spade, Diamond, Heart, and Clover pieces), which can be used to access further areas in the amusement park. Throughout the area, costumes and bombs can be found that allow Cheerful White to complete certain puzzles on the overworld.

Unlike the primary Mario Party titles where the player(s) explore a Monopoly-style board, Bomberman Land Touch! has the player exploring an overworld, freely exploring as much of the area has been unlocked. In this mode, the only control used is touch control - both for the overworld and for the mini-games. The overworld requires the touch screen to move Bomberman and to tap on icons to initiate an event. The touch screen is used for most mini-games, although in a handful of mini-games, the microphone is used as well. These mini-games can be played in Attraction mode either with one player, one player and 1-9 computer players, or 1-10 human players. The multiplayer mode can be played online or locally (which can be done with a minimum of two Nintendo DS consoles and one copy of Bomberman Land Touch!).

=== Battle mode ===
Battle mode consists of the traditional maze-like gameplay, where multiple Bomber People blow their way through obstacles, collect power-ups, and attempt to defeat the other Bomber People. Also, the game allows players to compete in a deathmatch contest with 10 players in LAN or across the world with the Nintendo Wi-Fi Connection.

== Reception ==
Reception

Aggregate score
Aggregator	Score
Metacritic	78/100

Review scores
Publication	Score
Consoles +	(JP) 14/20 (EU) 11/20
Eurogamer	7/10
Famitsu	30/40 (C+A) 28/40
GameSpot	8.1/10
IGN	8.5/10
Nintendo Power	7/10
Nintendo World Report	8.5/10
Official Nintendo Magazine	86%
Retro Gamer	85%
VideoGamer.com	5/10

The game received "generally favorable reviews" according to the review aggregation website Metacritic. In Japan, Famitsu gave it a score of two eights and two sevens, while Famitsu Cube & Advance gave it a score of all four sevens.

== See also ==
- Bomberman (Nintendo DS)
- Bomberman Land (Wii)
