= Bomberman 64: The Second Attack! =

1999 video game

- North American Nintendo 64 cover art
- Developer: Hudson Soft
- Publishers: JP: Hudson Soft; NA: Vatical Entertainment
- Directors: Satoru Sugimoto; Koji Innami
- Producers: Tadahiro Nakano; Hiroyuki Mikami
- Programmer: Satoru Sugimoto
- Artist: Shoji Mizuno
- Writer: Naoki Yoshida
- Composers: Tomohiko Kira; Yasunori Mitsuda; Hidenobu Otsuki; Tomori Kudo; Hiroyo Yamanaka; Yoshitaka Hirota; Kenji Hiramatsu
- Series: Bomberman
- Platform: Nintendo 64
- Release: JP: December 3, 1999; NA: May 29, 2000
- Genre: Action
- Modes: Single-player, multiplayer

Bomberman 64: The Second Attack! (Note: Known in Japan as Explosive Bomberman 2 (Japanese: 爆(ばく)ボンバーマン2, Hepburn: Baku Bonbāman Tsū)) is a 1999 action video game, the sequel to 1997's Bomberman 64.

== Gameplay ==
In many aspects, the game plays identically to Bomberman 64, with features such as the ability to make bombs bigger. As opposed to the circular explosions of the first Nintendo 64 title, the explosions in The Second Attack are the traditional cross "+" shape.

Second Attack brought many new features to the game, such as:

- The ability to use the different element crystals with bombs to create certain elemental explosions
- A space shop to buy more heart containers, multiplayer stages on which to fight, and the move list of the next elemental astral knight to be fought
- Hidden armor pieces that will allow Bomberman to kick bombs without needing the bomb kick item, the ability to throw and pump bombs without the throw item, and the ability to use remote bombs without need of the remote bomb item
- Raise Pommy, a fighting partner, by giving him different types of foods. Pommy can also be played by a second human player with a second controller.

== Story ==
Bomberman finds a mysterious egg while celebrating his victory over Altair and Sirius on a hot spring planet and decides to take it with him while exploring space in his ship. One day, however, Bomberman's ship gets sucked into a black hole, and he wakes up to find himself in a jail. While in jail, the egg suddenly begins to hatch. The creature inside turns out to be a charabom named Pommy. With the help of Pommy, Bomberman is able to escape.

Bomberman learns there are some elemental crystals being collected by the evil Rukifellth, and the Astral Knights, that hold the current crystals. Regulus, whom Bomberman has fought before, is one of these Knights. They are missing the fire crystal which Bomberman has. It is up to Bomberman and Pommy to stop the new evil and retrieve the crystals. Along the way, he meets Lilith, a girl apparently working toward the same goal he is. He subsequently encounters her several more times throughout the game.

Once Bomberman defeats most of the knights, the way opens to Warship Noah, the cause of the black hole and the headquarters of the BHB army. Inside, he faces his toughest challenges, including fighting Lilith, now possessed by the goddess Mihaele (a female derivation of the archangel Michael), Rukifellth, whom it is revealed has been possessed by the demon Sthertoth, and finally Sthertoth himself. If Bomberman goes to the final confrontation without defeating all bosses first, Sthertoth will be impossible to defeat, resulting in a bad ending. Otherwise, the true final boss of the game will reveal itself and challenge Bomberman to decide the fate of the universe, resulting in the good ending.

In the good ending, Mihaele reunites with Sthertoth (against his will) to become the Angel of Light and Shadow, intending to destroy and recreate the world, but the Angel is defeated by Bomberman, chooses to believe that he can defend the universe, and disappears to lie dormant, releasing Lilith and Rukifellth and reviving the Elemental Knights.

This game gives an origin to Bomberman's universe. The universe was created by an angel, but the angel split into a light and a dark entity, the dark side tried to take over all creation, but the light side made the seven elemental stones and warriors who could control them to fight off the dark side. The light side won and the dark entity was sealed in an additional stone. The events in the game are set in motion when someone (Rukifellth) finds the stone and upon touching it is possessed by the dark entity, who then brainwashes the warriors created by the light entity to do his bidding (only Regulus resists) and sends them to find all seven elemental stones, so that he can regain his true form from the stone his body is sealed in. Bomberman was in possession of the Fire Stone, the last one they were missing.

== Reception ==
Reception

Aggregate score
Aggregator	Score
GameRankings	69%

Review scores
Publication	Score
GameSpot	5.2/10
IGN	5.3/10
Nintendo Power	8/10

The game received mixed reviews, with GameSpot stating that "Although Bomberman 64: The Second Attack! is not at all revolutionary, it is not especially well executed in any particular area, and it suffers noticeably in the graphics and sound departments, but it still has its moments" and IGN saying: "The game's look aspires to equal the quality first-generation titles like Super Mario 64 and Glover, but falls noticeably short" and "Cheesy music and sound effects never sounded so... average."

The game also brought praise, mostly on the single-player gameplay. GameSpot praised the single player mode, but considered the puzzles too short, saying "Overall, the single-player mode is right about average. Although the new bomb types add variety, most of the puzzles don't require much thought". IGN criticized the game length, but praised the game-play, as they say "The hidden stuff to be found and unlocked is way cool, but the length and difficulty of the one player mode is suspect." Allgame praised both the Pommy sidekick and the single-player mode, "his title does offer a fully developed single-player mode as well, in which the hero must travel to different areas, defeating enemy bosses and gaining new powers. Bomberman 64: The Second Attack! also introduces a cute little sidekick for the hero, who is occasionally helpful and who may "evolve" and grow in power if given the proper attention".
