= Bomberman Fantasy Race =

1998 video game

- European cover art
- Developer: Graphic Research Inc.
- Publishers: JP: Hudson Soft; NA: Atlus USA; EU: Virgin Interactive
- Director: Masato Shibata
- Producer: Akihiro Baba
- Artists: Shoji Mizuno; Kozue Satoh
- Composer: Hiroshi Tabata
- Series: Bomberman
- Platform: PlayStation
- Release: JP: August 6, 1998; NA: April 16, 1999; EU: July 2000
- Genre: Racing
- Modes: Single-player, multiplayer

Bomberman Fantasy Race (Note: Japanese: ボンバーマン ファンタジーレース, Hepburn: Bonbāman Fantajī Rēsu) (working title: Bomberman Fantasy Racing) is a racing video game developed by GraphicResearch Inc., released for PlayStation in Japan by publisher Hudson Soft in 1998, in North America by Atlus USA in 1999, and in Europe by Virgin Interactive in 2000. It is a spin-off of the Bomberman series.

The game was re-released via PlayStation Network for the PlayStation 3 and PlayStation Portable on August 26, 2008 in Japan and May 18, 2010 in North America for the PSone Classics series.

In Bomberman Fantasy Race, the player can select six different characters to ride on two different animal types, the Louie or the Tirra, each having unique individual skills. In the single player mode, the player must race against four CPU controlled opponents to reach first place. Creatures are able to dash, jump, and throw bombs. During the race, the player can find random items that can help or hinder their progress. Winning a race provides the player with coins which they can use to buy items, more powerful creatures, and new courses. Other modes include VS. Mode and Time Attack Mode.

== Gameplay ==
Bomberman Fantasy Race is a 3D racing game featuring two single player modes and a two player mode. Players choose one of six Bomberman characters, then select the creature which they want to ride. There are two types of creatures, the Louie and the Tirra, and the player can eventually choose from six of each. Before starting a race, players purchase items at a shop with their prize money. The goal of the main single player mode is to finish the race ahead of the other four racers, who are controlled by the CPU. The player is rewarded with prize money (called Bomberman coins) if they reach at least third place. If the player reaches first place, the player will be able to play a bonus course that will reward him with more coins. Finishing a course in first place will unlock a mirrored version of that course.

In the two player mode, players are able to bet money on the race. The player who wins the race will earn all the money that the losing player bet before the race. The player with the least amount of money is the one who decides if a bet can be placed on a race.

In Time Attack Mode, players race against the clock to post their fastest lap times and course records. Players can save a ghost data to study their runs or exchange it with friends. The ranking screen posts the player's name, creature, and best time.

Players can look and exchange coins in the bank. The bank has ten boxes with a lit blue light if they have coins, and a red one if they are full. Players exchange one hundred Copper coins for one Silver coin, and ten Silver coins for one Gold coin. When a safe in the bank is full, the coins are exchanged automatically. Coins can be used to buy new creatures at the stable, items, and courses.

Players are able to throw or drop bombs during a race. Other than using bombs to attack other opponents, players can use a bomb dash, giving their creatures an acceleration boost. Creatures are able to dash using stamina for a limited amount of time, and can also use a triangle jump by jumping off walls. During a race, players will come across panels that will give them different items which they can use to help their progress or hinder the progress of their opponents. Players can also find eggs among the course, and a creature can hold three eggs. The eggs function differently for each creature. A Louie will gain a speed boost, while a Tirra will form a barrier that will protect them from bomb explosions.

== Reception ==
Reception

Aggregate score
Aggregator	Score
GameRankings	62%

Review scores
Publication	Score
CNET Gamecenter	4/10
Consoles +	76%
Electronic Gaming Monthly	6.25/10
Famitsu	26/40
Game Informer	7.25/10
GameFan	77% (Note: In GameFan's early viewpoint of the game, three critics gave it each a score of 69, 83, and 80.)
GameSpot	5.7/10
IGN	6.8/10
Next Generation	3/5
Official U.S. PlayStation Magazine	2.5/5
Dengeki PlayStation	60/100, 55/100
The PlayStation	67/100, 56/100, 61/100

The game received mixed reviews according to the review aggregation website GameRankings. It was reviewed by IGN who said, "although it lacks a speedy adrenaline rush, and it doesn't push technical limits to the top, Bomberman Fantasy Race is a good time." Game Informer gave it an above-average review, nearly two months before the game was released Stateside. Next Generation said in an early review, "For all its cuteness and quirk, the somewhat stiff digital controls and tough tracks of Bomberman Racing [sic] make it a choice for fans and racing veterans only." In Japan, Famitsu gave it a score of 26 out of 40.
