= Bomberman 2 =

2008 video game

- PAL box art
- Developer: Hudson Soft
- Publisher: Hudson Soft
- Producer: Gen Suzuki
- Designers: Gen Suzuki; Yasukazu Majima
- Programmer: Hajime Hosokawa
- Artist: Masami Nukariya
- Series: Bomberman
- Platform: Nintendo DS
- Release: JP: December 4, 2008; EU: February 13, 2009
- Genre: Action
- Modes: Single-player, multiplayer

Bomberman 2 (Custom Battler Bomberman in Japan) is a video game for the Nintendo DS. The game takes place in Grid City, a cyberspace-like setting.

== Gameplay ==
The game contains a single player Mission Mode and multiplayer Battle Mode. In addition, there is a custom multiplayer mode, allowing for customization in fighting other non-CPU players. Scattered armor parts can also be collected and equipped to enhance Bomberman's power through a leveling system, adding strategic depth to the gameplay.

The game is also compatible with the Nintendo DS Rumble Pak for force feedback during gameplay.
