= Bomberman Land =

2000 video game

- Developer: Hudson Soft
- Publisher: Hudson Soft
- Series: Bomberman
- Platform: PlayStation
- Release: JP: December 21, 2000
- Genre: Minigames
- Modes: Single-player, multiplayer

Bomberman Land is a video game released on December 21, 2000, for PlayStation. Unlike traditional Bomberman games, Bomberman Land is primarily based around playing various minigames. The game received several sequels, becoming its own spin-off series.

== Gameplay ==
Bomberman Land is a game that allows a multiplayer experience that allows the players to adventure through a series of mini games. It also gives the option of playing single player in Story Mode. There are various levels, puzzles, and quests to be solved. The game also includes Battle Pack Mode, which is the classic way of playing Bomberman.

The goal of the game is to collect 125 B-CARD pieces obtained through the adventures inside the Bomberman Land theme park.

== Story ==
The story begins with the White Bomber at the beach for leisure, and he receives an invitation to an amusement park. When he arrives, he realizes that the other characters and friends from the game also got invites and were there as well. A strange figure appears on the screen and steals the main Director away. It is now the White Bomber's job to win the various events and defeat the Champion at his own game.

== Sequels ==
Following the release of Bomberman Land, the game would spawn a spin-off series with multiple sequels, including Bomberman Land 2, Bomberman Land 3, Bomberman Land Touch!, Bomberman Land Touch! 2, and the 2007 Wii and PSP games. Bomberman 64 also features a mode called "Bomberman Park", which features identical gameplay and several minigames from Bomberman Land.
