= Bomberman Land (PSP video game) =

2007 video game

- Developer: Racjin
- Publishers: JP/NA: Hudson Soft; PAL: Rising Star Games
- Series: Bomberman
- Platform: PlayStation Portable
- Release: JP: 21 March 2007; NA: 29 January 2008; EU: 14 March 2008; AU: 20 March 2008
- Genre: Party
- Modes: Single-player, multiplayer

Bomberman Land, known in Japan as Bomberman Land Portable (ボンバーマンランド ポータブル, Bonbāman Rando Pōtaburu), is a video game released for PlayStation Portable on 21 March 2007 in Japan, and in North America and the PAL region in 2008. Part of the Bomberman franchise, it is the sixth game in the Bomberman Land series and the portable counterpart to the console version released for the Nintendo Wii in the same month.

== Gameplay ==
The main game progresses through a series of mini-games, with story scenes in between some of them. The classic multiplayer battle mode can be played with up to 4 players, one per system, with just one copy of the game. Multiplayer mode can also work with most of the Story mode's mini-games.

== Reception ==
Reception

Aggregate score
Aggregator	Score
Metacritic	55/100

Review scores
Publication	Score
1Up.com	C
Famitsu	23/40
GamePro	3.25/5
GameSpot	6/10
GamesRadar+	2/5
GameZone	6/10
IGN	6.9/10
PlayStation Official Magazine – UK	4/10
PlayStation: The Official Magazine	1.5/5
PSM3	45%

The game received "mixed" reviews according to the review aggregation website Metacritic. In Japan, Famitsu gave it a score of 23 out of 40.
