= Bomberman Live =

2007 video game

- Developer: Backbone Entertainment
- Publisher: Hudson Soft
- Series: Bomberman
- Platform: Xbox 360
- Release: July 18, 2007
- Genres: Action, puzzle
- Modes: Single-player, multiplayer

Bomberman Live is a downloadable video game for the Xbox Live Arcade, developed by Backbone Entertainment as part of the Bomberman franchise. The game was announced on May 16, 2007 and released later that year. It would later see a retail release as part of the 2009 Xbox Live Arcade Game Pack.

A sequel, Bomberman Live: Battlefest, was released in 2010.

== Gameplay ==
Anywhere from two to eight players compete in a battle or tournament, both of which consist of a series of individual rounds. In a tournament, the number of rounds is set at the beginning, whereas in a battle, play continues until one player has reached a set number of wins. In each round, the players are placed within a map, and use their arsenal of bombs to attack each other until only one is left standing. Players can also use their bombs to destroy bricks in the map, opening new routes and potentially revealing power-ups.

== Development ==
=== Downloadable content ===
On August 29, 2007, Bomb-Up Pack 1 was made available for download on Xbox Live Marketplace. On September 26, 2007, Bomb-Up Pack 2 became available. On December 26, 2007, Bomb-Up Pack 3 was made available.

== Reception ==
Reception

Aggregate score
Aggregator	Score
Metacritic	84/100

Review scores
Publication	Score
1Up.com	A
Eurogamer	8/10
GamePro	4/5
GameSpot	7.5/10
GameZone	8.5/10
Hardcore Gamer	4.5/5
IGN	8.4/10
Official Xbox Magazine (US)	8.5/10
Retro Gamer	82%
TeamXbox	9.3/10

The game received "favorable" reviews according to the review aggregation website Metacritic. GameSpot said, "this ten-dollar game (800 Live points) will give you plenty of bang for your buck." IGN said, "The game is a ton of fun, very dynamic in terms of gameplay, and more than worth the asking price."

The game sold more than 600,000 units by December 2010.
