= Bomberman: Panic Bomber =

1994 video game

- PC Engine Super CD-ROM² cover art
- Developer: Hudson Soft
- Publisher: Hudson Soft
- Director: Takafumi Horio
- Producer: Masanori Wake
- Artists: Shōji Mizuno; Naoto Yoshimi
- Composers: Shinichi Sakamoto; Jun Chikuma
- Series: Bomberman
- Platforms: PC Engine Super CD-ROM², FM Towns, NEC PC-9821, Arcade, Super Famicom, Virtual Boy, X68000, PlayStation Portable
- Release: PC Engine Super CD-ROM²: JP: 22 December 1994; Super Famicom: JP: 1 March 1995; Virtual Boy: JP: 21 July 1995; NA: December 1995
- Genre: Puzzle
- Modes: Single-player, multiplayer
- Arcade system: Neo Geo MVS

Bomberman: Panic Bomber (Note: Japanese: ボンバーマン ぱにっくボンバー) is a 1994 puzzle video game developed and published by Hudson Soft for the PC Engine (in Super CD-ROM² format) on December 22, 1994. It was later released for the Neo Geo, Super Famicom, X68000, FM Towns, NEC PC-9821, Virtual Boy, and PlayStation Portable. It saw a re-release for the Wii and Wii U's Virtual Console services, and in the Super Bomberman Collection (2026) compilation. Panic Bomber is a falling block game with the players' goal being to clear matching blocks using bombs, ensuring their screen does not fill and that their opponents' screens do. It received mixed to positive reception, identified as a decent game by multiple critics. It has been compared to the falling block puzzle game Tetris. The Virtual Boy version received a mixed reception for its handling of the platform's visual capabilities.

== Gameplay ==
PC Engine Super CD-ROM² version screenshot

Bomberman: Panic Bomber is a "falling blocks" puzzle game based on the Bomberman franchise. The goal of the game is to make the opponent lose by causing their field to fill to the top with objects. This is done by causing chains of bombs to explode, sending useless rubble over to the opponent's field. Bombs are earned by causing chains of three identical blocks to disappear. Bombs can only be blown up with an explosion from a lit bomb, which falls from the top of the screen every so often. If the player causes enough damage, they can eventually earn a giant bomb, which will remove a large amount of debris from the playing field, and cause their opponent a good deal of trouble.

The game's regular story mode revolves around Bomberman's hunt for the Golden Bomber statue. During his trek, he fights against several different odd characters, like Drifty the balloon or Cecil the tiger. The player's progress is saved by a password system.

== Ports and related releases ==
Screenshot of Panic Bomber for the Virtual Boy. It uses a red-and-black color scheme standard to the system.

In Japan, Panic Bomber was released for the PC Engine Super CD-ROM² on December 22, 1994. This was followed by a release for the Super Famicom as Super Bomberman: Panic Bomber W, (Note: Japanese: スーパーボンバーマン ぱにっくボンバーＷ) on March 1, and on the Virtual Boy as Panic Bomber (Note: Japanese: とびだせ！ぱにボン, Hepburn: Tobidase! Panibon) on July 21, 1995.

It was also ported to Neo Geo, PlayStation Portable and multiple Japanese home computers such as the X68000, FM Towns, and NEC PC-9821. The Virtual Boy version uses a red-and-black color scheme and parallax, an optical trick that is used to simulate a 3D effect. A Panic Bomber minigame was also included in Bomberman 64 (2001) and Bomberman Land 2. The original PC Engine CD version of Panic Bomber was later re-released on Wii in 2008 and the Wii U Virtual Console in Japan in 2015 (with the latter release also being available for the first time in North America and Europe in 2017, albeit untranslated). A port for the Neo Geo CD was also showcased but never released. Panic Bomber W was re-released in 2026 via an update to Super Bomberman Collection, marking its first English language release.

== Reception ==
Reception

Review scores
Publication	Score
AllGame	2.5/5
Famitsu	7/10, 7/10, 7/10, 5/10 (PC Engine) 5/10, 6/10, 5/10, 6/10 (SFC) 6/10, 5/10, 5/10, 4/10 (VB)
Next Generation	2/5
Nintendo Life	7/10

The Neo Geo version of Panic Bomber was a moderate success in Japan. The four reviewers of Electronic Gaming Monthly gave the Neo Geo version a 7 out of 10, describing it as a decent if unexceptional Tetris clone, with one reviewer commenting "This genre is so flooded that it's hard to come up with a unique angle, and there isn't one for Panic Bomber". The other three argued that the game "has enough originality to make it stand on its own." GamePro remarked the gameplay and graphics are too simple to justify the game's appearance on the powerful Neo Geo, but praised its play mechanics and addictive nature and concluded, "For a system renowned for fighting games, Panic is a refreshing presence."

Reviewing the Virtual Boy version, a Next Generation critic said that while the game itself is "decent" and "addictive", it is poorly suited for the Virtual Boy, since it does not use the console's 3D capabilities and is less fun to play without colors to distinguish the different pieces. He gave it two out of five stars. GamePro, in contrast, said the game "pushes the Virtual Boy engine to its max", while admitting the 3D effects are "a little timid". The reviewer hailed the gameplay as being "as addictive as Zoop or Tetris."

== See also ==
- Puyo Puyo
- Panel de Pon
- Magical Drop
