= Bomberman 64 (1997 video game) =

1997 video game

- North American Nintendo 64 cover art
- Developer: Hudson Soft
- Publishers: JP: Hudson Soft; WW: Nintendo
- Director: Hitoshi Okuno
- Producers: Shinichi Nakamoto; Hidetoshi Endo
- Designer: Kōji Innami
- Programmer: Isao Kobayashi
- Artist: Shoji Mizuno
- Composer: Akifumi Tada
- Series: Bomberman
- Platform: Nintendo 64
- Release: JP: September 26, 1997; EU: November 21, 1997; NA: December 3, 1997
- Genre: Action-adventure
- Modes: Single-player, multiplayer

Bomberman 64 (Note: Known in Japan as Explosive Bomberman (Japanese: 爆(ばく)ボンバーマン, Hepburn: Baku Bonbāman)) is a video game developed and published by Hudson Soft as "Baku Bomberman" in Japan, and published by Nintendo as "Bomberman 64" in North America and Europe for the Nintendo 64. In Japan the "Bomberman 64" name was chosen for another game, the fourth Japanese N64 entry in the series. The 1997 game was released in Europe and North America in November and December 1997, respectively. While the game never saw a release on the Wii's Virtual Console service, it was released on the Wii U Virtual Console in both Europe and North America in March 2017 followed by Japan in June 2017.

Bomberman 64 is the first 3D game within the Bomberman series. It implements a different single-player mode by incorporating action-adventure and platforming stages instead of arenas in which enemies or other elements must be destroyed. This new variety of single-player game was well-received by critics for its imagination and depth, though most critics also deemed the multiplayer mode to be lacking compared to previous entries in the series.

Three more Bomberman games were released on the Nintendo 64: Bomberman Hero (1998), Bomberman 64: The Second Attack (2000), and Bomberman 64 (2001).

== Gameplay ==
This game is featured in full 3D, thus the directional controls change. Bomberman is able to walk in eight directions with a rotating camera facing in eight directions and with three different zoom levels. His bombs have a different effect than in other games of the series; the bomb's explosion waves have a spherical pattern, rather than the traditional cross-shaped ones.

In both single player and multi-player modes, Bomberman always has the ability to kick, pick up, and throw bombs, without the need of power-ups, as in previous games. A unique feature of this game is that Bomberman can "pump" a bomb while holding it, which will make the bomb's explosion more powerful. A pumped-up bomb cannot be kicked or picked up again. Unlike most platform games of its time, Bomberman cannot jump, nor can he swim in water, although he can wade in shallow water. Since Bomberman lacks the ability to jump, higher areas that do not have a path leading to them must be reached by bouncing across bombs - typically this requires the "remote" power-up to avoid the normally timed bombs exploding early. "Bomb jumping" is actually required to fully explore most levels, retrieve certain power-ups, and cross many obstacles.

If Bomberman runs into an enemy NPC, or is hit on the head by a small object, such as an unexploded bomb, he will become temporarily dizzy. While in this state, he can get hoisted up by an enemy and thrown around, or even finished off by getting thrown off the map, or into a bomb explosion. Bomberman can do the same to an enemy.

When Bomberman takes damage, he dies. If he has a "heart" power-up when he's hit, he will survive, but he will lose the heart and taking damage simply causes Bomberman to drop the heart, and if it doesn't bounce off the level, he can pick it up again to survive another hit. In the Hard mode, the heart will disappear. When he dies in multiplayer mode, all the power-ups he obtained will scatter all over the place. In the Normal single-player mode, he keeps the power-ups until the player runs out of credits. The game has six bosses that perform the same bomb attacks as Bomberman, and the other six bosses that fight in their own unique way. All bosses can cause Bomberman to be dizzy if they touch him on Hard mode.

=== Game progression ===
At the start of the game, Bomberman can enter any of four worlds, which are terrariums of other planets (that were likely drained by Altair as the planet that was Blue Resort world being drained as shown in the opening cutscene). In each world, there are four stages. The first and third stages are adventure stages, which Bomberman must navigate by solving puzzles and blasting his way toward the "Goal Arrow." The second and fourth stages are boss stages. Bomberman must fight Sirius or one of Altair's subordinates in the second stage, and he must fight the world's guardian in the fourth causing that world's anchor on Black Fortress to break. (This does not happen with the worlds that are past the first four.)

After Bomberman beats the first four worlds, he can enter the Black Fortress. Like the previous worlds, the first and third stages are adventure stages, but this time Bomberman must fight the guardian in the second stage and Altair himself in the fourth stage.

In every stage, there are five gold cards to collect (100 total). Once all gold cards have been collected, the player can unlock the secret world, Rainbow Palace. After all the gold cards have been collected from there (an additional 20, making a grand total of 120 Gold Cards), the player unlocks more courses in multiplayer mode, plus the "Full Power" cheat option. With the cheat activated, Bomberman starts with 8 bombs, 5 flames, power bombs, and remote bombs.

== Synopsis ==
In the game's opening sequence, a peaceful-looking planet with gardens, rivers, and residential buildings abound is shown (this planet being the world Blue Resort). But then the space pirate, Artemis, drops from the sky with a band of soldiers to raid the planet. Altair, the leader of the space pirates, watches from the Black Fortress, using his coveted weapon, the Omni Cube, to completely drain the planet's energy, condemning it to a zombie-like state. Artemis returns to the Black Fortress to meet up with her partners, fellow pirates Orion and Regulus, and her superior, Altair. Together, they set their sights on their next target: Planet Bomber, home of the protagonist, Bomberman.

They maneuver their fortress into the atmosphere of Planet Bomber. Bomberman, from atop a cliff, observes the Black Fortress' descent. Not much later, the Fortress begins to open fire on the people of Planet Bomber, firing destructive energy rays into populated areas. A warrior clad in white then flies out to the surprised Bomberman and asks if he plans to defeat the assailants. Bomberman gives an affirmative response, and the stranger (later introduced as Sirius) explains that a force field protects the Fortress from any outside attack. Sirius goes on to say that this force field can be deactivated by destroying the four anchors attached to the Fortress; the "Green Garden": a ruin-filled natural world, "Blue Resort": a fortress surrounded by water, "Red Mountain": a large volcano fraught with danger, and "White Glacier": a large, snowy mountain covered in ice. Once inside the Fortress, they must find and destroy Altair.

Bomberman climbs onto and destroys all four anchors with the help of Sirius, who supplies power-ups and teaches him new techniques. In the process, he kills Artemis and Orion, but Regulus survives. Once the force field around the Fortress is deactivated, the duo enter the Fortress. After sneaking through Altair's security measures, Bomberman finds and confronts Altair, and after a difficult struggle, defeats the pirate. The previously defeated Regulus swoops in and attempts to rescue his master from the battlefield (if Bomberman hasn't collected 100 gold cards thus far, he is successful), but is then knocked away by Sirius. Altair drops the Omni Cube, which Sirius lands on the battle platform to retrieve. Altair is annihilated by a newly powered-up Sirius. Sirius reveals that he was only using Bomberman's abilities to take back the Omni Cube, which was stolen by Altair, adding that he was sick of working with him and lying to him during the mission. He takes the Omni Cube and escapes to his secret lair, the Rainbow Palace, to destroy Planet Bomber.

Bomberman pursues him, making his way through the palace, confronting Sirius for his betrayal. When Sirius is about to fire on Bomberman, he is saved by Regulus, knocking him away and destroying the Omni Cube. With the aid of Regulus, Bomberman defeats Sirius. Without the power of the Omni Cube, the Rainbow Palace crashes into the Black Fortress, destroying both, as Regulus escapes with Bomberman, informing him that he was surprised by Bomberman's ability to defeat Sirius, as he and his comrades had considerable difficulty taking the Omni Cube from Sirius. Regulus leaves Planet Bomber, stating that one day he will have a rematch with his new rival, Bomberman, who celebrates his victory.

== List of Characters and Bosses ==
Character	Description
Bomberman	The playable protagonist
Sirius	Mysterious warrior who tests Bomberman and is the main villain of the game. Named after the star Sirius.
Altair	Owner of the Omni cube that he stole from Sirius, and the captain of the attack against Planet Bomber.
Artemis	She is the fire user of The Masked Trio and the only woman. She is seen to take over the world of "Blue Resort" in the opening cutscene. She gets her name goddess in Greek Mythology Artemis. In the Japanese version of the game, she is named after a star.
Orion	The shock barrier user of The Masked Trio. He or a copy of him uses Hades in the stage "Hot Avenger". Named after the Orion constellation.
Regulus	The melee combatant of The Masked Trio and the only one to survive multiple non-sparing fights against Bomberman. In the true ending, he helps you take on Sirius. The only one outside Bomberman who appears in another game, that game being Bomberman 64: The Second Attack! Named after the star Regulus.

== Development ==
After working on the game for about six months, the development team scrapped all their initial designs and started anew due to the emergence of more advanced 3D games on the market. It was subsequently exhibited at the 1997 Electronic Entertainment Expo.

== Reception ==
Reception

Aggregate score
Aggregator	Score
GameRankings	69%

Review scores
Publication	Score
AllGame	3.5/5
Computer and Video Games	3/5
Edge	5/10
Electronic Gaming Monthly	7.75/10
GameFan	245/300
GameSpot	4.6/10
IGN	7.6/10
N64 Magazine	50%
Nintendo Power	7.0/10
Official Nintendo Magazine	80%

Bomberman 64 received mixed reviews. Critics almost unanimously commented that, in a reversal of the Bomberman series's most fundamental trend, the single-player mode is much better than the multiplayer mode. However, their opinions of the overall quality of these modes varied. Doug Perry from IGN applauded the single-player mode for its intrigue and inventiveness, particularly the bomb bridging and tower-building abilities, and stated that the multiplayer mode, while not the best of the series, is accessible and benefits from well-designed arenas. Joe Fielder from GameSpot instead judged the single-player mode to be a satisfying improvement over previous Bomberman single-player experiences, but not essential, and said that the multiplayer mode has "lost all the addictive charm that so positively defined the series."

Shawn Smith and Dan Hsu of Electronic Gaming Monthly considered the multiplayer mode outright problematic, remarking that the 3D format, which occasionally makes it difficult to see what the player character is doing even in single-player mode, is a constant hassle in multiplayer. Hsu commented that "in my book, certain games should stay 2-D, and the B-man series is no exception." Their co-reviewer Crispin Boyer opined that the multiplayer simply gets old quickly, while Kraig Kujawa found it sufficiently intense and fun, though not as good as in previous installments. GamePro found that the analog stick control works fine in single-player mode, but causes heavy aggravation in the heat of the multiplayer battle mode. However, the reviewer concluded that the single-player mode is good enough to make the game worth buying.
