= Bomberman =

Video game series

- Bomberman logo
- Genres: Puzzle, maze, action, party
- Developers: Hudson Soft: Konami; Backbone Entertainment; HexaDrive; Produce!; Pi Studios; Racjin; Rocket Studio; Westone; Red Art Studios
- Publishers: Hudson Soft, Konami: Activision; Atlus; Electro Brain; Majesco; Nintendo; Rising Star Games; Sega; Sony Computer Entertainment; Ubisoft; Vatical Entertainment; Virgin Interactive; Vivendi Universal Games
- Creators: Yuji Tanaka; Toshiyuki Sasagawa; Shinichi Nakamoto
- Artists: Shoji Mizuno; Naoto Yoshimi; Kozue Narai (Kozue Satoh)
- Composers: Jun Chikuma; Yasuhiko Fukuda; Keita Hoshi; Shohei Bando; Hironao Yamamoto
- First release: Bomber Man; July 1983
- Latest release: Super Bomberman Collection; February 5, 2026

Bomberman (Note: Japanese: ボンバーマン, Hepburn: Bonbāman) is a video game franchise created by Yuji Tanaka, Toshiyuki Sasagawa, and Shinichi Nakamoto while at Hudson Soft. The franchise is owned by Konami following its acquisition of Hudson Soft in 2011.

The franchise began with the game Bomber Man, (Note: 爆弾男, Bakudan Otoko) which was released in Japan on July 1983 and internationally in 1984. Starting with the TurboGrafx 16 rendition in 1990, multiplayer would be introduced to the series, with this version supporting up to five players. Multiplayer would go on to become a key component of the series, with later Bomberman games supporting as many as 10 players locally in Saturn Bomberman and 64 players online in Super Bomberman R 2. As of 2026, the most recent installment is Super Bomberman Collection.

== Games ==
The first installment in the franchise, Bomb-Man, was originally developed for the Sharp X1 by programmer Yuji Tanaka while working at Hudson Soft. Gameplay involves traversing a maze to defeat balloon-shaped enemies using time bombs. After being ported to more platforms, including the PC-88, the game was released in Japan on July 1983. The game was released internationally the following year with the name Eric And The Floaters; the international name was chosen to avoid any controversy in using the word "bomb".

Release timeline
1983	Bomber Man (爆弾男, Bakudan Otoko)
1984	3-D Bomberman
1985	Bomberman (NES)
1986
1987	Bomber King
1988
1989
1990	Bomber Boy
1990	Bomberman (1990)
1991	Bomberman (arcade game)
1991	Bomberman II
1991	Bomber King: Scenario 2
1992	Bomberman World (arcade game)
1992	Bomberman '93
1993	Super Bomberman
1993	Bomberman '94
1994	Super Bomberman 2
1994	Bomberman GB
1994	Mega Bomberman
1994	Bomberman: Panic Bomber
1995	Super Bomberman: Panic Bomber W
1995	Super Bomberman 3
1995	Panic Bomber
1995	Bomberman GB 2
1996	Super Bomberman 4
1996	Saturn Bomberman
1996	Bomberman GB 3
1996	Bomberman B-Daman
1997	Super Bomberman 5
1997	Neo Bomberman
1997	Atomic Bomberman
1997	Bomberman 64
1997	Saturn Bomberman Fight!!
1997	Pocket Bomberman
1998	Bomberman World (PS1)
1998	Bomberman Wars
1998	Bomberman Hero
1998	Bomberman Fantasy Race
1998	Bomberman Party Edition
1998	Bomberman Quest
1999	Bomberman B-Daman Bakugaiden
1999	Bomberman 64: The Second Attack!
1999	Bomberman Max
2000	Bomberman B-Daman Bakugaiden V
2000	Bomberman Land
2001	Bomberman Tournament
2001	Bomberman Online (Dreamcast)
2001	Bomberman Kart
2001	Bomberman 64 (2001 video game)
2002	Bomberman Max 2
2002	Bomberman Generation
2002	Bomberman Jetters
2003	Bomberman Online (PC)
2003	Bomberman Land 2
2003	Bomberman Jetters Game Collection
2004	Net de Bomberman
2004	Bomberman Kart DX
2004	Bomberman (N-Gage)
2004	Bomberman Hardball
2005	Bomberman (DS)
2005	Bomberman: Panic Bomber (PSP)
2005	Bomberman Land 3
2006	Bomberman: Bakufuu Sentai Bombermen
2006	Bomberman Land Touch!
2006	Bomberman (PSP)
2006	Bomberman: Act Zero
2007	Bomberman Land (Wii)
2007	Bomberman Story DS
2007	Bomberman Land (PSP)
2007	Bomberman Live
2007	Bomberman Land Touch! 2
2008	Bomberman Online Japan
2008	Bomberman Blast
2008	Bomberman 2 (DS)
2009	Bomberman Ultra
2009	Bomberman Blitz
2010	Bomberman Live: Battlefest
2010	Bomberman Dojo
2011
2012
2013
2014
2015
2016
2017	Super Bomberman R
2018	Bombergirl
2019
2020	Super Bomberman R Online
2021
2022	Amazing Bomberman
2023	Super Bomberman R 2
2024
2025
2026	Super Bomberman Collection

== Anime ==
- Bomberman B-Daman Bakugaiden
- Bomberman Jetters

== Gameplay ==
Most games in the Bomberman franchise largely revolve around two modes of play; single player campaigns where the player must defeat enemies and reach an exit to progress through levels, and multiplayer modes where players must attempt to eliminate each other and be the last one standing. Gameplay involves strategically placing down bombs, which explode in multiple directions after a certain amount of time, in order to destroy obstacles and kill enemies and other players. The player can pick up various power-ups, giving them benefits such as larger explosions or the ability to place more bombs down at a time. The player is killed if they touch an enemy or get caught up in a bomb's explosion, including their own, requiring players to be cautious of their own bomb placement. In addition to the main maze-based Bomberman games, some spin-off titles involve adventure, platformer, puzzle, and kart racing gameplay.

== See also ==
- Battle royale game
- Last man standing (video games)
