= Bomberman Legends =

- Developer: Genetic Fantasia
- Publisher: Atari Corporation
- Programmers: Jeremy Mika; Mike Mika; Robert Baffy
- Artist: Jeff Burke
- Series: Bomberman
- Platform: Atari Jaguar
- Release: Unreleased
- Genres: Action, maze, party
- Modes: Single-player, multiplayer

Bomberman Legends, also known as Jaguar Bomberman, is an unreleased action-maze video game that was in development by Genetic Fantasia and planned to be published by Atari Corporation for the Atari Jaguar. It was going to be a unique entry in the Bomberman franchise, featuring its own dedicated single-player and multiplayer modes, with the latter having support for up to eight players by using two Team Tap adapters.

The idea of creating a Bomberman title for the Jaguar was primarily hatched by Genetic Fantasia, which was a development company that was formed by Mike Mika, along with his colleagues to Atari Corp. during a behind-the-scenes meeting at Las Vegas in 1994, with the team looking at Super Bomberman 2 in order to replicate its gameplay mechanics on the system.

Though Atari acquired the license of Bomberman from Hudson Soft between 1994 and 1995, the project would be discontinued by the former sometime in 1996 along with other upcoming projects for the platform such as Black ICE\White Noise and Thea Realm Fighters, due to Atari preparing to drop support for the Jaguar before merging with JT Storage in a reverse takeover on April of the same year. Bomberman Legends was never previewed or mentioned in magazines and other publications at the time when the title was still being developed, until its existence was revealed during an online Q&A session hosted by Next Generation in April 1998. The game was also thought to be lost, before its source code was eventually recovered in recent years by two of the original programmers of the title.

== Gameplay ==
Gameplay screenshot from a beta build of Bomberman Legends

Bomberman Legends is an action-maze game that plays very similarly like other games in the Bomberman franchise. There were going to be two gameplay modes: a single-player story mode, which took elements from titles of the series that were released at the time such as Super Bomberman and Bomberman '93, with plans to feature an extensive storyline and cutscenes, and a multiplayer mode which supports up to eight players by plugging two Team Tap multitaps into the console. Before starting a multiplayer match, players would have the choice to customize their Bomberman character with power-ups.

== Development ==
According to Mike Mika, one of the original programmers for the project, him and his colleagues were still in college with their studies but they had aspirations of entering into the video game industry. In 1994, the group traveled to Las Vegas and formed a game development company to discuss with multiple console manufacturers at SCES '94 and obtain a development kit in order to begin working on titles for systems that were still active on the market, such as the Nintendo Entertainment System. The team approached to Atari Corporation and began discussing with Jeff Minter, known for his work in Tempest 2000 on the Jaguar, who recommended them to speak with Atari Corp. representative Normen Kowalewski, which in turn he told them to meet him behind the scenes at a hotel. When the group arrived to the location, Atari had a Jaguar development setup along with a prototype of the Atari Jaguar CD add-on for demonstration purposes to third-party developers. Interested in acquiring a development kit for the system, the team spoke with company representatives in regards to the subject and reached an agreement, purchasing and receiving various hardware kits to program games for the system.

During a brainstorming session, the team originally had plans to create a project that was a spoof of the damsel in distress plot found in various titles at the time, but the idea was later discarded after publishers showed little interest in it, however, they later settled down in creating a Bomberman title as their "dream game", with Mike himself contacting Hudson Soft via online in regards to develop a title of the series for the Jaguar. He discussed with an employee of the company named Bill Rich and told that Atari was interested in acquiring the rights of the series, with the latter agreeing to do so after speaking with Hudson, and the team started development of Bomberman Legends between late 1994 and early 1995. The development team took care in making the title as faithful to the series, by looking at Super Bomberman 2 on the Super Nintendo Entertainment System as the standard, while they sent notes to Hudson in regards as to how they approached its development.

Sometime during development, Mike and his team received a telephone call from then-Atari Corporation vice-president in third-party development Bill Rehbock, who told to them if they could remove any reference to Bomberman due to monetary issues that Atari was having during this period and make it an original property instead. A few days later, the team received another call from Bill, who told them that Atari was preparing to stop support for the Jaguar and cancelled upcoming projects for the system, including Bomberman Legends and Atari merged with JT Storage in a reverse takeover in April 1996. Prior to its discontinuation, the team managed to get the multiplayer mode working, while the single-player mode had just begun development. It was never advertised or mentioned in any publication during its development.

=== Reveal ===
The existence of Bomberman Legends was first hinted by Ultra Game Players magazine via their website, until it was officially confirmed to the public at an online Q&A session hosted by Next Generation magazine on April 2, 1998, revealing that one of their then-current staff members (Mike Mika, who began writing for the magazine as early as March 1998) previously worked on the unreleased game and one of the reasons as to why the project was ceased by Atari. During another online Q&A session hosted by Next Generation on July 24 of the same year, the name of the developer who worked on the project was revealed to be Genetic Fantasia, and that the company was based on Michigan. The game was briefly mentioned in an October 2000 issue of GameFan magazine during an article written by Eric C. Mylonas on "The Graveyard" section, with Eric suggesting Songbird Productions to publish the title.

=== Rediscovery ===
On May 25, 2014, the source code of Bomberman Legends that was originally thought to be lost was found on a CD-ROM and eventually preserved by Mike and his brother Jeremy Mika, who was one of the lead programmers of the title, along with a member of the Jaguar community. More information about the project was revealed on Twitter posts written by Mike, including production artwork and character sprites of the game that were showcased to the public in 2016 and 2021 respectively.
