= Bomberman (disambiguation) =

Bomberman is a video game franchise originally developed by Hudson Soft.

Bomberman may also refer to:

- Bomberman (1983 video game), the first video game in the series
- Bomberman (1985 video game), a 1985 video game for the Nintendo Entertainment System
- Bomberman (1990 video game), a 1990 video game
- Bomberman (2005 video game), a 2005 game for the Nintendo DS
- Bomberman (2006 video game), a 2006 video game for the PlayStation Portable
- Other Bomberman video games
