= Hiten =

Hiten may refer to:

- Hiten (name), Indian given name
- Hiten (spacecraft), Japanese lunar probe
- Tennin, spiritual being in Japanese Buddhism

== See also ==
- Hi-Ten Bomberman, 1993 action-maze video game
