= Jun Chikuma =

Japanese music composer and musician

Jun Chikuma 竹間淳 (Note: She often writes her first name in katakana, i.e. Jun Chikuma (竹間 ジュン, Chikuma Jun).)
- Also known as: June Chikuma; Chiki
- Born: Japan
- Genres: Chiptune; video game music; Arabic music
- Occupations: Musician; composer; arranger
- Instruments: Piano; ney; riq
- Years active: 1985–present

Jun Chikuma (竹間 淳, Chikuma Jun) is a Japanese music composer and musician. She is most known for her various contributions to the Bomberman series, amongst other video game soundtracks.

She has studied ney performance and Tunisian style composition under professors Slah Manaa, Ali Sriti and Zakia Hannashi at l'Institut Superieur de la Musique de Tunis, and studied riq under Haytham Farghaly of the same institute. She currently curates arab-music.com, and has also made music for many T.V. shows, films and commercials. She is also a part-time lecturer at Kokushikan University, and has since performed many concerts with the classical Arabic music ensemble Le Club Bachraf, with oud player Yoshiko Matsuda and darbuka player Takako Nomiya.

== Musical style ==
Her soundtrack for Bomberman Hero features drum and bass and acid techno styles, heavily incorporating fast breakbeats and sub-bass lines from the former genre.

She has stated in interviews that she approaches her music with the philosophy of ‘art suprematism’ or ‘absolute music.’

== Works ==
=== Video games ===
Year	Title	Notes
1985	Bomberman (NES version)	
1986	Adventure Island	
1986	Doraemon	
1987	Faxanadu	
1988	Jaseiken Necromancer	
1988	The Legendary Axe	With Toshiaki Takimoto
1989	Military Madness	
1989	Cratermaze (Japanese version)	
1989	Wonder Boy III: Monster Lair	
1990	Atomic Punk	With Noriyuki Nakagami and Yasuhiko Fukuda
1990	Bomberman	
1991	Bomberman II	
1992	Bomberman '93	
1993	Super Bomberman	
1993	Bomberman '94	
1994	Bomberman: Panic Bomber	
1995	Super Bomberman 3	With Keita Hoshi
1996	Bomberman B-Daman	Supervisor
1996	Ginga Ojousama Densetsu Yuna: Mika Akitaka Illust Works	
1996	DoReMi Fantasy: Milon no Dokidoki Daibouken	
1996	Super Bomberman 4	
1996	Saturn Bomberman	
1997	Nectaris	
1997	Super Bomberman 5	With Yasuhiko Fukuda
1997	Saturn Bomberman Fight!!	With Yoshio Tsuru
1997	Pocket Bomberman	With Shinya Yano
1998	Bomberman World	With Hironao Yamamoto
1998	Bomberman Hero	
1998	Bomberman Party Edition	
1998	Bomberman Quest	With Keiji Ueno and Goro Takahashi
2001	Bomberman Tournament	With Koichi Seiyama
2007	Sonic and the Secret Rings	With various others.

=== Anime ===
- Bomberman B-Daman Bakugaiden (1998)

=== Other works ===
- "Samai Bayati Al Aryan" on Music Design (1994) – with Le Club Bachraf
- "Ismael Hayat" on Ten Plants (1998)
- Musique classique de Tunisie et d'Egypte (2000) – with Le Club Bachraf
- Concert at Dar Rachidia (2013) – with Le Club Bachraf
- Les Archives (2019)
- The Midas Touch (2022)
- The Lantern Wheel (2024)
