= Super Bomberman 4 =

1996 video game

- Developer: Produce!
- Publisher: Hudson Soft
- Directors: Shinji Imada; Shinsuke Fujiwara
- Producer: Tadashi Ozaki
- Designer: Takayuki Hirai
- Programmer: Takeo Sumita
- Artists: Naoto Yoshimi; Shoji Mizuno
- Composer: Jun Chikuma
- Series: Bomberman
- Engine: Super Bomberman
- Platform: Super Famicom
- Release: JP: 26 April 1996
- Genres: Action, maze, party
- Modes: Single-player, multiplayer

Super Bomberman 4 (Note: Japanese: スーパーボンバーマン４, Hepburn: Sūpā Bonbāman Fō) is an action-party video game developed by Produce and published by Hudson Soft. It was developed for the Super Famicom, released on April 26, 1996, in Japan. Part of the Bomberman franchise, it is the fourth installment of the Super Bomberman series.

The story begins at an unknown time after Super Bomberman 3. Bagular's brain escaped the explosion of his flying saucer and has summoned the Four Bomber Kings and Great Bomber to get revenge on White and Black Bomber. The two, along with other fellow Bombermen, are sent hurtling back in time to fight through different eras and ultimately stop Bagular.

== Gameplay ==
Story mode gameplay.

Multiplayer battle mode.

Super Bomberman 4 is an action game in which players lay bombs to destroy enemies or other bombermen. Other than laying bombs, the game includes a number of power-ups, which allow players to increase the range of a bomb's explosion, punch or kick bombs already on the ground, or pick them up and throw them at another player. The explosions of the bombs can harm anyone on the field, including the bombermen who left the bomb in the first place. There are two game modes, Normal Game (the campaign, which can be played with two players), and the Battle Game, which has three separate modes.

New to the game are a wide range of creatures which are enemies to the player, but when defeated, they turn into eggs. When the player picks an egg, they can use the creatures, which come in two types, organic and mechanical. Players can pick additional eggs to store more creatures, but only of the same type of creature that they are riding.

Certain stages contain cages with trapped allies inside. When freed, allies move around the stages mostly destroying the soft blocks. Stages also have secret warps which transport the player to a number of bonus stages. These warps can only be accessed when two players play the game together, and one player, using the Power Glove item, tosses the other player to the warp.

=== Normal Game ===
Normal Game returns to the objective of the original game, with Bomberman needing to defeat all enemies to reveal the goal. This mode features five worlds, each with eight levels. Bomberman will face the Four Bomber Kings and Great Bomber in the seventh level of each world, then face the world's boss at the last level. When a world is cleared, players may revisit it. Levels can be replayed via passwords.

=== Battle Game ===
The Battle Game has three modes. Battle Royale is the classic Bomberman battle mode, in which a maximum of five players (human-controlled or CPU) can play against each other, or divide themselves in two teams. Bombermen that are controlled by the CPU can have three different difficulty levels. Revenge carts can be enabled, and a bonus game, where the winner of a single match participates in a race to get an item, can also be enabled. The battle mode has ten stages, which can be changed using three different passwords.

Champion Mode allows a max of two players to face the Four Bomber Kings and Great Bomber in order for three rounds. The credits will appear when the player defeats the Four Bomber Kings and Great Bomber.

Maniac Mode allows players to customize their own match with a number of options. Players can edit how and which items will appear on the battlefield and how many hits they can take before being defeated. However, players cannot make teams, change the timer, rounds, or stages, and are instead forced to play on the normal battle stage, with three rounds and three minutes.

In Battle Game, the player can choose to play as Bomberman, the Four Bomber Kings, and Great Bomber. The Four Bomber Kings and Great Bomber each have a unique ability. Bazooka Bomber, Jet Bomber, and Great Bomber, however, will have their speed, number of bombs, and the range of their explosions decreased for ten seconds after using their abilities. Bomberman also has a unique ability that allows him to stop other Bombermen from grabbing or pushing him.

== Plot ==
After pursuing and eventually destroying Bagular, White Bomber enjoyed a moment of rest with Black Bomber and his friends while returning home on a space shuttle. All passengers are unaware that four lights approach the shuttle, and they eventually collide with the ship. This creates a time hole in space that transports White and Black Bomber to the prehistoric age. There, White Bomber meets Great Bomber, who following the late Bagular's will, is leading the Four Bomber Kings on an operation through time to capture him and his friends. White Bomber and Black Bomber must battle through time to foil Bagular's plan.

== Development ==
=== Audio ===
The music of the game was composed by Jun Chikuma. The game reuses music from other installments in the series. The map screen music from Bomberman '93 is used in the map screen of the game, and the first world, final world, and final boss music from Bomberman '94 is used in the first world, fifth world, and final boss of the game, respectively. The battle menu theme is taken from Super Bomberman 3, as is the battle game music.

== Release and marketing ==
Super Bomerman 4 was released in Japan for the Super Famicom on April 26, 1996.

A full color guide book with 114 pages for the game was released on May 20, 1996, published by Shogakukan as part of their Wonder Life Special series, called Super Bomberman 4 Hudson Official Guide Book (スーパーボンバーマン4ハドソン公式ガイドブック, Sūpā Bonbāman Fō Hadoson Kōshiki Gaido Bukku). It featured a complete walkthrough of the Normal Game along with enemy files, level layouts, boss tactics, and information on the Battle Game.

The game was localized into English for the first time in 2026 as part of the Super Bomberman Collection compilation.

== Reception ==
Reception

Review scores
Publication	Score
Consoles +	94%
Famitsu	7/10, 8/10, 7/10, 7/10
Total!	2+ (B+)
Video Games (DE)	81%
Fun Generation	8/10
Marukatsu Game Shōnen	6/10, 6/10, 6/10
neXt Level	85%

Nicolas Gavet, writing for Consoles +, praised Super Bomberman 4's new features, engaging gameplay, excellent controls and fluid character animation. His criticism was focused on the soundtrack, which he described as having varied quality, as well as the short introduction and the option screens in Japanese.
