= Bomberman Party Edition =

1998 video game

- North American cover art
- Developer: Metro Corporation
- Publishers: JP: Hudson Soft; EU: Virgin Interactive; NA: Vatical Entertainment
- Director: Shigeki Fujiwara
- Producer: Hiroaki Baba
- Designers: Ikuya Ochi; May. Mamoru Ichimura
- Artists: Shoji Mizuno; Kozue Satoh
- Composer: Jun Chikuma
- Series: Bomberman
- Platform: PlayStation
- Release: JP: December 10, 1998; EU: July 1999; NA: November 7, 2000
- Genres: Strategy, maze
- Modes: Single-player, multiplayer

Bomberman Party Edition, known in Japan and Europe as simply Bomberman, is a PlayStation version of the 1983 game Bomberman. In addition to vintage graphics for single player mode, an option for enhanced graphics is added. The game was released to the PlayStation Network as a PSone Classic on May 28, 2008, in Japan and December 10, 2009, in North America.

== Gameplay ==
The single player mode is very similar to the 1985 release of Bomberman. The player controls the titular Bomberman in a wide area, full of destructible and non-destructible blocks. The blocks can be destroyed with bombs, and may contain a power up that increases Bomberman's walking speed, the size of bomb explosions, the number of bombs able to be placed, or the ability to explode your bombs with the push of a button or to walk through walls or bombs. Some power ups are temporary, allowing Bomberman to be immune to bombs or monsters. The point of each level is to destroy each monster, and then locate the door, which is located underneath a random block.

After every few levels, the player can play a bonus level. The player is invincible, and an endless stream of monsters is to be destroyed by the player. The point is to try to build up score until a bonus life is awarded. Similar in design to Super Bomberman, there are a number of level themes in the single player mode. Battle mode is added to this release, which features 8 courses with 3 levels per course.

== Reception ==
Reception

Aggregate score
Aggregator	Score
GameRankings	72.75%

Review scores
Publication	Score
AllGame	3.5/5
Consoles +	89%
Electronic Gaming Monthly	7.5/10
Famitsu	29/40
GameSpot	7.1/10
IGN	7.6/10
Joypad	4/10 (Note: Joypad provided scores of 4/10 for single-player and 7/10 for multiplayer.)
M! Games	83%
Mega Fun	70%
Official U.S. PlayStation Magazine	2.5/5
Player One	66%
PlayStation: The Official Magazine	6/10
Video Games (DE)	78%
Dengeki PlayStation	80/100, 50/100
neXt Level	65%
Station	69/100

According to Famitsu, Bomberman Party Edition sold over 34,945 copies in its first week on the market and sold approximately 156,600 copies during its lifetime in Japan. The game received an average reception from critics, holding a rating of 72.75% based on eight reviews according to review aggregator GameRankings. GamePro's Mike Weigand praised the game's colorful graphics, solid audio and controls, but criticized the limited single-player modes and long loading times.
