= Bomberman Tournament =

2001 video game

- Developer: Hudson Soft
- Publishers: JP: Hudson Soft; WW: Activision
- Director: Shigeki Fujiwara
- Producer: Hiroyuki Mikami
- Artists: Shoji Mizuno; Kozue Satoh
- Composers: Koichi Seiyama; Jun Chikuma
- Series: Bomberman
- Platform: Game Boy Advance
- Release: JP: April 27, 2001; NA: June 26, 2001; EU: August 10, 2001
- Genre: Action-adventure
- Modes: Single player, multiplayer

Bomberman Tournament (Note: Known in Japan as Bomberman Story (ボンバーマンストーリー, Bonbāman Sutōrī)) is a game in the Bomberman series for the Game Boy Advance. The game contains a multiplayer battle mode between linked Game Boy Advance consoles. The player and up to three others can compete in any of the game's eight multiplayer battle arenas, each of which has its own unique gameplay twist.

== Story ==
On the edge of the galaxy sits a small planet, Phantarion. From the cutscene at the beginning of the game, it is given that five meteors (the five Dastardly Bombers, from Super Bomberman 2 and Super Bomberman 3) hit the planet. Shortly thereafter, a large fortress was erected, and in turn the land around the tall, tower-like fortress and the fortress itself began to freeze over. The people of Phantarion sent out a distress call, and Professor Ein sent Max to investigate. Upon arriving on the planet, Max makes his way to the base of the tower. Once inside, he is confronted by a huge bird creature (later found to be Plasma Bomber in his transformed state). He is knocked out by the bird by one fell blow, and is either sent to the top of the tower or down a hole (the exact cannot be determined, Max is only shown being pulled into a dark, foreboding circle in the center of the screen). When Doctor Ein talks to Bomberman a week later, Bomberman tells him that they have lost all contact with Max. Bomberman is then sent by Ein to save Phantarion and find Max, thus beginning the playable portion of the story.

== Gameplay ==
Tournament was generally lauded for its simple, approachable gameplay. In order to score (in multiplayer mode), players must lay time bombs in order to trap and obliterate their opponents, with the last player alive becoming the winner. As the player defeats enemies and clears away obstacles, a variety of power-up tiles appear. Randomly selected from a pool of 10 different items, these tiles have a number of effects, such as increasing bombs' blast radius, increasing the player's bomb capacity, or even reversing a player's controls.

Unlike other Bomberman games, Tournament's single-player quest mode is an action-adventure game with influences of Zelda, Pokémon and especially Hudson's Neutopia.

The majority of the action takes place in 2D from a top-down vantage point, while Karabon battles and select minigames are presented in a side view. Each of the game's six different environments possesses only a minimum of rectangular features but is detailed with other features, such as trees that topple over or an earthen giant collapsed in the middle of a road.

== Development ==
Bomberman Tournament was developed by Hudson Soft. The game was first announced at the 2000 Nintendo Space World, with a single screenshot shown to the public. Publisher Activision was given publishing rights to release Tournament in Europe and North America.

== Reception ==
Reception

Aggregate scores
Aggregator	Score
GameRankings	83%
Metacritic	88/100

Review scores
Publication	Score
AllGame	4/5
Electronic Gaming Monthly	7/10
EP Daily	8.5/10
Eurogamer	8/10
Famitsu	26/40
Game Informer	8.5/10
GameSpot	8.6/10
GameSpy	90%
IGN	8.5/10
Next Generation	4/5
Nintendo Power	4/5
Nintendo World Report	(Metts) 9.5/10 (Lake) 9/10

Bomberman Tournament received "generally favorable reviews", according to the review aggregation website Metacritic. NextGen called it "An established multiplayer classic whose added single-player mode mixes in two of Nintendo's most beloved franchises." In Japan, however, Famitsu gave it a score of 26 out of 40. Michael "Major Mike" Weigand of GamePro said, "Complete with colorful visuals and simple, dead-on controls, Bomberman will be right at home in this Tournament." (Note: GamePro gave the game two 4/5 scores for graphics and sound, and two 4.5/5 scores for control and fun factor.)

According to a sales report from Reuters, Bomberman Tournament contributed to Activision's revenue going up thirty percent to $110 million in the second quarter of 2001. Both Tournament and the Game Boy Advance version of Tony Hawk's Pro Skater 2 accounted for 31% of the revenue.
