= Saturn Bomberman Fight =

1997 video game

Saturn Bomberman Fight!!
- Developer: Eleven
- Publisher: Hudson Soft
- Artists: Shoji Mizuno; Kozue Satoh
- Composers: Yoshio Tsuru; Jun Chikuma
- Series: Bomberman
- Platform: Sega Saturn
- Release: JP: December 11, 1997
- Genre: Maze
- Modes: Single-player, multiplayer

Saturn Bomberman Fight!! (Note: Japanese: サターンボンバーマン ファイト！！, Hepburn: Satān Bonbāman Faito!!) is a 1997 maze video game developed and published by Hudson Soft for the Sega Saturn. It is the second Bomberman game for the Saturn, after Saturn Bomberman. It features full 3D graphics unlike previous titles in the series.

== Gameplay ==
Unlike previous Bomberman titles, which were 2D, Saturn Bomberman Fight!! is a fully 3D game featuring an isometric viewpoint. It features 14 characters. Each character has a life bar that depletes when they are hit, instead of the one-hit kills of other Bomberman games. Characters can also jump over walls or to avoid explosions. The stages are smaller than previous 2D Bomberman titles, and it features up to four players.

Gameplay modes in the game include Story Mode, Training mode, Battle mode, and survival mode.

== Release ==
It was released in Japan for the Sega Saturn on 11 December 1997, and it was not released outside of Japan. To promote the game, a commercial featuring Segata Sanshiro was made. It was followed up by Bomberman Wars in 1998.

== Reception ==
Reception

Review scores
Publication	Score
Famitsu	23/40
GameSpot	7.4/10
Sega Saturn Magazine (UK)	90
Joypad	82/100
Sega Saturn Magazine (JP)	5/10
MAN!AC	71/100
Mega Console	84/100
Ação Games	8/10
Sega Magazin	74%

Saturn Bomberman Fight!! received generally positive reviews. GameSpot rated the game 7.4 out of 10, praising the gameplay and calling it a "welcome surprise" after the disappointing Bomberman 64. In the review for Bomberman World, GameSpot stated that the two best recently released titles in the series were Saturn Bomberman, and Saturn Bomberman Fight, but lamented that they were for a system that was not popular in America.

The UK Sega Saturn Magazine gave it a score of 90 out of 100. Famitsu gave the game a score of 23 out of 40. Joypad gave it a score of 82 out of 100.
