= Hi-Ten Bomberman =

1993 video game

- Developer: Hudson Soft
- Publisher: Hudson Soft
- Designer: Katsuhiro Nozawa
- Series: Bomberman
- Release: JP: 1993
- Genres: Action, maze
- Mode: Multiplayer

Hi-Ten Bomberman (Note: Japanese: HI-TEN ボンバーマン, Hepburn: Haiten Bonbāman) is a 1993 action-maze video game developed and first showcased by Hudson Soft at their Super Caravan events in Japan. It is a multiplayer-only entry in the Bomberman franchise, featuring support for up to ten players and widely regarded by many to be the first commercially created game for widescreen HDTVs, as well as being regarded to be the basis for Saturn Bomberman, but it was never released for the general public.

== Gameplay ==
Gameplay screenshot

Hi-Ten Bomberman is a multiplayer-only action-maze game that plays very similarly like other games in the Bomberman franchise, featuring support for up to ten players, with each one being assigned to a different colored Bomberman character depending on which controller port is used with the multitaps while utilizing a large, landscape-style HDTV widescreen to display its vast playfield. The main objective of the game is to defeat all of the opponents filling the playfield by placing bombs, while destroying the blocks in the mazes may uncover useful items for the players including extra bombs, fire range increasers and other items.

There are five different modes of play to choose from at the main title screen: Battle Royale, 2 Group Battle, 3 Group Battle, 5 Group Battle and 1 VS 9 Battle. Battle Royal, as the name implies, is a deathmatch mode between ten players where the last standing Bomberman becomes the winner. 2 Group Battle is a multiplayer mode where two teams consisting of five players battle against each other. 3 Group Battle is a nine-player-only battle mode in which three teams of three players are pitted against each other. 5 Group Battle is a cooperative multiplayer mode where five two-player teams battle to become the winner. 1 VS 9 Battle is a ten-player mode where one player is pitted against a large nine-player team.

== History ==
Hi-Ten Bomberman was conceived by Katsuhiro Nozawa, who previously worked on several Hudson Soft titles such as Star Soldier and J.J. & Jeff. The game ran on a combination of two PC Engine units for basic hardware and controller inputs along with a custom PC-based PCB nicknamed Iron Man, (Note: Tetsujin (鉄人)) which later became the basis for the PC-FX but no plans for a home release on the platform were considered. Between five and ten units were produced and each one cost around JP¥2,000,000. In an interview with Gamasutra, former Hudson Soft executive Takahashi Meijin stated that the reason for the company in developing the project was due to NHK wanting to push the HDTV market in Japan at the time and the expanded 16:9 aspect ratio allowed the team to have ten players on-screen but required writing a custom technology to do so.

Hi-Ten Bomberman was first showcased to attendees at the 1993 Super Caravan event hosted by Hudson Soft and was last seen playable at Studio Park on the NHK Broadcasting Center in August 1997 in Japan, where it was available to play for the general public. It is widely credited by video game magazines and other dedicated outlets to be the first commercial game created for widescreen HDTVs, though Namco's 1988 Homerun Contest preceded it five years prior. Despite being showcased only in Japan, Hudson Soft had plans to showcase the game across other regions, which never came to fruition for unknown reasons. In 1994, an updated version of Hi-Ten Bomberman titled Hi-Ten Chara Bomb (Note: Haiten Kyarabomu (HI-TEN キャラBOM)) was first showcased by Hudson Soft to the attendees at the 1994 Super Caravan event, which increased the arena's size and introduced selectable characters, most of which were from other Hudson properties such as Bonk, Far East of Eden, Milon's Secret Castle and Momotaro Densetsu.

== Reception and legacy ==
Both Edge and Next Generation praised Hi-Ten Bomberman for the gameplay and technological achievement. Olivier Prezeau of French magazine Joystick regarded Hi-Ten Chara Bomb to be impressive due to its 16:9 aspect ratio display. The game has been regarded to be the basis for Saturn Bomberman. In 2019, multiple discs containing data of the title were found by Takahashi Meijin.
