= Bomberman Quest =

1998 video game

- Developer: Eleven
- Publishers: JP: Hudson Soft; NA: Electro Brain; EU: Virgin Interactive
- Directors: Shigeki Fujiwara; Takeshi Ikenouchi
- Artists: Shoji Mizuno; Kozue Narai; Kozue Satoh
- Composers: Keiji Ueno; Goro Takahashi; Jun Chikuma (Battle Theme)
- Series: Bomberman
- Platform: Game Boy Color
- Release: JP: 24 December 1998; NA: November 1999; EU: 1999
- Genre: Action role-playing
- Modes: Single player, multiplayer

Bomberman Quest (Note: Japanese: ボンバーマンクエスト, Hepburn: Bonbāman Kuesūto) is an action role-playing game. The player takes the role of Bomberman, who has to defeat monsters and collect items to defeat the Commander bosses of each area. Bomberman Quest marks the departure of veteran composer, Jun Chikuma.

== Gameplay ==
The game is an action role-playing game with a top-down view perspective, where players freely control Bomberman through several regions, including: Peace Town, Field Zone, Forest Zone, Beach Zone, and Desert Zone, while seeking help from the locals. Players can acquire power-ups such as bomb parts and abilities that enhance skills by defeating monsters. Additionally, the game features a battle mode where two players can fight via the Game Link Cable accessory.
