= Bomberman (cancelled video game) =

- Developer: Hudson Soft
- Publisher: Konami
- Series: Bomberman
- Platform: Nintendo 3DS
- Release: Cancelled
- Genre: Action-adventure
- Modes: Single-player, multiplayer

Bomberman (Note: Japanese: ボンバーマン, Hepburn: Bonbāman) was the working title of a cancelled action-adventure video game that was in development by Hudson Soft to be published by Konami for the Nintendo 3DS. Intended to be a unique entry in the Bomberman franchise, it was going to feature its own dedicated single-player campaign and multiplayer mode with support for up to four local players and eight players via online support.

== Gameplay ==

Top: Story mode gameplay.
Bottom: Multiplayer battle mode.

Bomberman for Nintendo 3DS is an action-adventure game that plays similarly to earlier 3D entries in the Bomberman franchise. The main premise during single-player mode was going to revolve around Bomberman embarking on a journey to free Central City from renegade robot corps. The single-player campaign was reported to be reminiscent of Bomberman 64: The Second Attack, as two players could cooperate locally using special bomb types unavailable in the multiplayer mode to resolve puzzles while navigating obstacles and defeating enemies.

The multiplayer mode was similar to previous Bomberman titles, as up to four players would participate across battle arenas in local battles. Up to eight players could compete via an online connection with new mechanics such as the "Life System", which allowed players to extend the lifebar of their characters at the playfield and survive attacks from rivals or act as a handicap for newcomers.

== History ==
Bomberman for Nintendo 3DS was first announced by Nintendo at E3 2010 as one of the games in development by Hudson Soft for the platform alongside Deca Sports Extreme and a third Kororinpa title. Later in October 2010, Bomberman for 3DS was slated for a 2011 launch with Omega Five, Tetris: Axis and a Bonk title. In January 2011, gameplay footage was showcased during a video reel for upcoming 3DS games and the title was now planned for an Autumn 2011 release with Nikoli's Pencil Puzzle. However, on the same month, it was reported that Konami was in process of converting Hudson into a wholly owned subsidiary, as the company wanted to acquire their intellectual properties and experience in the mobile phone markeplace.

Two months afterwards, Japanese magazine Famitsu reported in their March 24, 2011 issue that Bomberman, Bonk and Omega Five were cancelled for the 3DS, however a Konami representative stated that the company would continue to publish Hudson Soft-developed titles but said games were not confirmed. Another Konami representative later stated to Wired's Jason Schreier that the cancellation announcement was not true and the company planned to showcase the game at E3 2011, which ultimately never occurred. An original Bomberman entry would not be released until Super Bomberman R for Nintendo Switch in 2017, co-developed by HexaDrive and former Hudson Soft staff that worked on previous Bomberman titles at Konami.
