= Exvania =

1992 video game

- Developer: Namco
- Publisher: Namco
- Composer: Yoshie Arakawa
- Platform: Arcade
- Release: JP: December 1992
- Genres: Maze
- Modes: Single-player, multiplayer
- Arcade system: Namco NA-1

Exvania (Note: Japanese: エクスバニア, Hepburn: Ekusubania) is a 1992 action video game developed and published by Namco for arcades. It was released in Japan in December 1992. It is a multiplayer-focused game with similar gameplay to Hudson Soft's Bomberman series.

Hamster Corporation released the game outside Japan for the first time as part of their Arcade Archives series for the Nintendo Switch and PlayStation 4 in April 2024.

== Gameplay ==
The players must take up control of four medieval lords who are fighting for control of the land; they have to battle through eight different castles, and try to gain control of each one. When one of the lords wins a battle, he shall receive a medal - and once he has won three medals, he will gain control of the current castle (which means that they can be up to six rooms long) and the game will proceed to the next castle. The lords start out in the four corners of the screen and can only be killed by bombs, but a strike from the whips will temporarily stun them. The objective is to trap the other lords with bombs and kill them or otherwise force them to walk into the path of an exploding bomb - and treasure chests are numerous in each room, and can be broken with the whip. Each treasure chest contains a powerup (such as speed shoes, boomerangs, extra bombs, larger bombs, and more); the game's name is also a reference to the fact that it is a parody of Konami's Castlevania series or Akumajō Dracula as it was originally known in Japan.

Every third room is a "dragon room", in which an enormous dragon is seen walking around freely; they come in three different colors (red, green and black), become stronger as the lords progress through each castle, and in later castles begin to breathe fire (which is just as lethal as a bomb) and attack the players in other ways. If a dragon is successfully killed, powerups will appear all around him - and other enemies, like blobs of slime and possessed skeletons, appear as the castles progress. They cannot kill the players, but can significantly stun them in various ways and become more numerous with each level; when the time is down to 40 seconds the text "DANGER" will appear on the screen and Death (who had previously appeared in Sega's Quartet in 1986) appears, flying towards the lords and killing them on impact, and when the time runs out, an evil witch will electrify the room to kill all the surviving lords at a stroke. The final room pits the winning player (the player who has won the most matches and who controls the most castles) against the final boss, the witch, who attacks with lightning spells.

== Plot ==
The queen of darkness, Erinyes (エリニュス), has kidnapped Princess Electra (エレクトラ姫). The four heroes: Ward (ウォード), Emilio (エミリオ), Charles (チャールズ) and Karl (カール) embark on a quest to save the princess. They compete with each other to reach the Castle of Darkness and defeat Erinyes, so one of them might be able to marry the rescued Electra and rule the land (the eponymous "Exvania").

Each of the lords has their own ending sequence, but Karl's is slightly different from that of the other three (as Princess Electra is horrendously ugly, and when he throws a bomb at her to fend her off, it explodes in her hand and blows both of them up, causing him to mix Greek text with Japanese Kanji in the quotation ΟΧΔ口Ο口Χ! which reads as "OCHD Kuchi O Kuchi CH!"). Greek text was previously used by Namco for Face Off, in 1988, when one of the members of the losing team said the phrase ΟΔΧ (which reads as "ODCH") on the continue screen in the "versus" mode.

== Soundtrack ==
The music from the game, composed by Yoshie Arakawa, was included in the album Namco Video Game Graffiti Vol. 10.
