= Doraemon (1986 video game) =

1986 video game

- Front cover of Doraemon package
- Developer: Hudson Soft
- Publisher: Hudson Soft
- Director: Katsuhiro Nozawa
- Producer: Yukio Osato
- Programmer: Katsuhiro Nozawa
- Writers: Katsuhiro Nozawa; Takahashi Meijin
- Composer: Jun Chikuma
- Platform: Family Computer
- Release: December 12, 1986
- Genres: Action-adventure; Shoot 'em up
- Mode: Single-player

Doraemon (Note: Japanese: ドラえもん, Hepburn: Doraemon) is a 1986 action video game developed and published by Hudson Soft for the Family Computer exclusively in Japan. It is based on Fujiko F. Fujio's (the pen name of Hiroshi Fujimoto) Japanese manga series of the same name, which later became an anime series and Asian franchise. It was the tenth best selling Famicom game released in 1986, selling approximately 1,150,000 copies in its lifetime. It is the third game created for the Doraemon license after the versions created for the Arcadia 2001 and the Epoch Cassette Vision. Even though the game is playable without any knowledge of Japanese, fan translations are available.

The game was re-released by Hamster Corporation released the game as part of the Console Archives series for the Nintendo Switch 2 and PlayStation 5 on July 30, 2026. A limited physical edition also includes an exclusive version for the Nintendo Switch.

== Gameplay ==
In this game, Doraemon must travel through three different chapters to save Nobita Nobi and his friends, who have all been kidnapped. Power-ups can be obtained in each chapter to increase Doraemon's strength and health meter.
