= Bomberman Touch =

- App icon for the first game
- Developer: Hudson Soft
- Publisher: Hudson Soft
- Series: Bomberman
- Platform: iOS
- Release: July 10, 2008 (Touch); June 17, 2009 (Touch 2)
- Genres: Action, maze
- Modes: Single-player, multiplayer

Bomberman Touch is a series of Bomberman games for iOS created by Hudson Soft.

The first game, Bomberman Touch: The Legend of Mystic Bomb (Note: Bonbāman Touch: The Legend of Mystic Bomb (ボンバーマン Touch: The Legend of Mystic Bomb)) was released in 2008, as a launch title for the App Store. The sequel, Bomberman Touch 2: Volcano Party (Note: Bonbāman Touch 2: Borukēno Pāti (ボンバーマン Touch 2 ボルケーノ・パーティ)), released in 2009. The sequel adds multiplayer and online social interaction through the OpenFeint platform. It was later updated for Game Center support.

== Gameplay ==
The Legend of Mystic Bomb does not include the series' traditional multiplayer battle gameplay, and instead focuses on single-player gameplay where "Bomber John" must use bombs to explore grid-structured mazes.

The sequel, Volcano Party, also focuses on maze exploration, but with an autoscrolling wall of lava. Volcano Party includes multiplayer co-op, as well as a traditional multiplayer battle mode for multiple iPhone devices.

== Reception ==
Reception

Aggregate score
Aggregator	Score
GameRankings	(1) 63%

Review scores
Publication	Score
1Up.com	(1) B−
GameZone	(1) 8/10
IGN	(1) 8/10
Pocket Gamer	(1) 3/5 (2) 2/5

The Legend of Mystic Bomb received mixed reviews according to the review aggregation website GameRankings. IGN praised the visual aesthetics, soundtrack, story, online functionality and game mechanics of The Legend of Mystic Bomb.
