= Military Madness =

1989 video game

- Developer: Hudson Soft
- Publishers: JP: Hudson Soft; NA: NEC
- Composer: Jun Chikuma
- Series: Nectaris
- Platforms: Android, BREW, Microsoft Windows, MS-DOS, PC-9801, PlayStation, TurboGrafx-16, X68000
- Release: JP: 9 February 1989; NA: 15 February 1990
- Genre: Turn-based strategy
- Modes: Single-player, multiplayer

Military Madness (Note: Also known as Nectaris (Japanese: ネクタリス, Hepburn: Nekutarisu) in Japan.) is a 1989 turn-based strategy video game originally developed and published by Hudson Soft in Japan and NEC in North America for the TurboGrafx-16. It is the first entry in the Nectaris series. Set in the year 2089, players take command of the Allied-Union forces in a desperate offense against the Axis-Xenon Empire army on the Moon before they launch the S.A.M. (Supreme Atomic Missile) weapon to obliterate Earth. Its gameplay consists of moving units into positions to confront enemies in turn-based encounters determined by multiple factors, capturing factories to produce resources and repair units in order to occupy the enemy prison camp or destroy all enemy forces.

Military Madness was later ported to other platforms, each one featuring several changes and additions compared to the original TurboGrafx-16 version, in addition of re-releases through download services for other systems, among other ways to play it. The game garnered positive reception from critics, some of which praised the audiovisual presentation and favourably compared its gameplay with other titles in the same genre such as Desert Commander and Advance Wars but others criticized several aspects, while other versions were also met with similarly positive reception from reviewers as well. It was also cited as a key influence on Dune II. A sequel, Neo Nectaris, was released in 1994 for the PC Engine Super CD-ROM² add-on.

== Gameplay ==

Top: Moving around the map.
Bottom: An attack sequence.
(TurboGrafx-16 version shown)

Military Madness is a science fiction-themed turn-based strategy game where players assume command of the Allied-Union across sixteen increasingly difficult maps that take place at the Moon in 2089, each one giving a pre-determined set number of units to use, on a desperate offense against the Axis-Xenon Empire before they launch their doomsday weapon S.A.M. (Supreme Atomic Missile) to obliterate Earth. Available modes of play include the main single-player campaign that carries the main storyline, a tutorial mode dubbed "Manual" to learn about the game's overall rules and a two-player versus mode. A password system used to keep progress of the single-player campaign. After completing the first basic set of maps, the game starts again but at a more difficult advanced set of 16 maps once the last basic map is cleared.

The main gameplay objective is to either occupy the enemy prison camp to free prisoners or destroy all opposing forces on the playfield and the player that does so first wins. Players command their units on a hex map, using a command box function, and each unit have different mobility range that varies according to their type except aircraft units in addition of possessing different shooting range. Terrain plays an important role during battle sequences, as it can affect the outcome of encounters in terms of terrestrial unit's mobility, attack and defense. Each unit also gains experience when involved in combat, becoming stronger with every encounter, while offensive and defensive capabilities are increased if friendly units are near to another friendly unit.

Units cannot be produced, but the Allied-Union forces can capture enemy units if they are in factories, or find unsecured factories and gain units from them. Units can also be repaired by returning them to factories under Allied-Union control, however a stored unit cannot be moved until the current turn ends. Transport units are also available to carry terrestrial units across the map. Selecting the "End" command results with players finishing their current turn. A unique gameplay feature is the "Zone of Control" system; players can surround an enemy unit by forming a circle that decreases both its offensive and defensive capabilities, however players can move to one hex position after a unit was surrounded by enemy units.

=== Synopsis ===
In the twenty-first century, humans made a foray into the Moon but great powers were in fierce conflict over the scarce lunar resources and the Axis-Xenon Empire insisted on their occupation. On 6 April 2089, the Axis-Xenon Empire sent their army to the Moon to occupy almost the entire location and all lunar factories fell into the hands of the Axis-Xenon Empire, mass-producing weapons one after another. Those who disobeyed were captured and placed into prison camps around the Moon, while the Axis-Xenon Empire is preparing to launch the doomsday weapon S.A.M. (Supreme Atomic Missile) to attack Earth. Those who knew the plan, the Allied-Union forces, escaped from their captivity and headed towards the launch base of S.A.M. to thwart the ambitions of the Axis-Xenon Empire.

== Release ==
Military Madness was first released for the TurboGrafx-16 in Japan by Hudson Soft on 9 February 1989 under the name Nectaris and later in North America by NEC on 15 February 1990. The game was re-released for Wii's Virtual Console worldwide in December 2006, also marking its first appearance in PAL regions. The title was also recently included as part of the TurboGrafx-16 Mini across every regional variant in 2020.

Military Madness was first ported under its Japanese name Nectaris by SystemSoft in Japan to the PC-9801 on 17 September 1993 and later to the X68000 on 25 September of the same year. In 1995, the game was ported to MS-DOS by Sunflowers and published by Hudson Soft in Europe under its original Nectaris name, featuring new units not found in the original TurboGrafx-16 release. The title later received a Windows 95 conversion as part of the CD-appendix included with the August–September 1997 issue of Japanese magazine LOGiN and was later distributed by Hudson at their official website as freeware, featuring a unit placement editor unique to this port. A Windows 98 version was released in 1999 as well.

An updated version for PlayStation was developed by Matrix Software and published by Hudson in Japan on 26 February 1998 and later in North America by Jaleco under the name Nectaris: Military Madness on 22 January 1999, featuring new maps and battle sequences rendered in 3D. The PlayStation version was later re-released by Konami for PlayStation Network in Japan on 14 May 2008. A mobile version for BREW was developed by Flying Tiger Development and published by Hudson on April 19, 2005. An Android version was also released on 12 May 2009, featuring a new interface for touch controls and redrawn graphics.

== Reception ==
Reception

Aggregate score
Aggregator	Score
GameRankings	(TG-16) 77.67% (BREW) 74.75%

Review scores
Publication	Score
AllGame	(PS) 4/5
Aktueller Software Markt	(TG-16) 10/12
Electronic Gaming Monthly	(TG-16) 31/40
Eurogamer	(Wii) 4/5
Famitsu	(TG-16) 31 / 40
GameSpot	(PS) 7.5/10 (BREW) 8.1/10 (Wii) 7.8/10
IGN	(PS) 8.5/10 (BREW) 8.8/10 (Wii) 7.5/10
Mega Fun	(PS) 71%
Nintendo Life	(Wii) 8/10
PC Games (DE)	(DOS) 71%
Oh!X	(X68K) 4/10
PC Joker	(DOS) 72%
PC Player	(DOS) 62/100
Play Time	(TG-16) 81%
Power Play	(TG-16) 79% (DOS) 69%

Awards
Publication	Award
VideoGames & Computer Entertainment (1990)	Best Military-Strategy Game
Electronic Gaming Monthly (1997)	#48 Top 100 Best Games of All Time

Military Madness received positive reception from critics since its release on the TurboGrafx-16, selling 200,000 copies in Japan, but did not sell well in North America due to the platform's failure to break into the market led by Nintendo and Sega. Aktueller Software Markt's Ottfried Schmidt praised the visuals and sound but criticized the music for being short in length. Michael Hengst of Power Play commended the game for its guidance to players, graphics and atmospheric music while criticizing the lack of additional maps to play but nevertheless recommended it to strategy enthusiasts. Electronic Gaming Monthly's four reviewers also commended the game positively for its moon setting and compared it favourably to Desert Commander. Ray of Play Time noted its complexity with simplistic operation and understandable ruleset, recommending the title to strategy fanatics. Tetsuya Inamoto of Japanese website Game Watch wrote that the rules were easy to understand for players despite being a full-scale strategic simulation. Military Madness garnered a "Best War Game" award and Video Games & Computer Entertainment's "1990 Best Military-Strategy Game" award. Electronic Gaming Monthly editors ranked it as the 48th best console video game of all time in 1997, describing it as "both easy to learn and incredibly rich in gameplay complexity", noting how the opening tutorial effectively teaches players the basics and the later levels introduce new mechanics and challenges at a manageable pace.

Hiroaki Kageyama of Oh!X reviewed the X68000 conversion titled Nectaris, feeling disappointed for the visuals due to not making use of the X68000's graphic capabilities, while criticizing game's the overall strategies. However, the X68000 version proved popular among the X68000 userbase in Japan. The MS-DOS conversion, also titled Nectaris, was met with positive reception from critics as well. Manfred Duy of PC Joker criticized both visuals and sound for being a straightforward conversion to DOS but commended the gameplay for being timeless. Likewise, PC Games's Lars Geiger criticized the graphics and sound, remarking that the maps were not complex as those in Battle Isle 2 but noted the game being fun. PC Player's Jörg Langer remarked that the title was interesting from a "historical" and experience the "forefather of today's hex field tactical games up close", regarding it to be fun due to the multiple units, number of maps and the simple but playful concept but Langer noted it could not compete with more modern games in the same genre due to being outdated. Power Play's Ingo Horn also criticized the graphics and sound as well but stated that strategists would not find a game as deep as Nectaris for DOS.

The PlayStation iteration was also well received by critics. AllGame's Joe Ottoson praised the map and vehicle designs, faithful rendition of the original HuCard music, responsive controls and replay value, stating that "Nectaris holds up well despite the age of the game". IGN commended Hudson Soft for revamping the original TurboGrafx-16 game from a visual perspective, the addition of construction mode and two-player action, noting that the title's strength lies within its simplicity and complexity, regarding it to be one of the best strategy games on PlayStation. GameSpot's Peter Bartholow regarded it as a solid title, commending its two-player component and graphical improvement to the maps but remarked that the polygonal battles were dated for the system visual-wise, as well as the music. Likewise, the mobile BREW version also garnered positive attention from reviewers.

Military Madness was also met with equally positive reception from reviewers since its re-release on the Wii's Virtual Console. Nintendo Life's Damien McFerran remarked that although the gameplay is not for everyone, he regarded it as one of the premier games of its type alongside Langrisser and Shining Force. Eurogamer's Kristan Reed noted similarities with Advance Wars titles but nevertheless regarded it as a solid effort that justifies its place on the Virtual Console for being playable and well designed. Likewise, IGN's Lucas M. Thomas also noted similarities with Advance Wars but said that "Military Madness is a lot of fun and certainly worth a look if you're a fan of turn-based, grid-based, moon-based strategy". GameSpot's Frank Provo claimed the title was ahead of its time, as it presented similarly complex turn-based battles as Advance Wars.

== Legacy ==
Military Madness was adapted to a manga titled The Shape of Happiness, (Note: しあわせのかたち (Shiawase no katachi)) published in the Famitsu Comix collection from March 1989, drawn by Tamakichi Sakura. A game with similar gameplay mechanics titled Earth Light was released for the Super Famicom in 1992, coded by the same programmer who worked on Military Madness. A sequel titled Neo Nectaris was released in 1994 for the PC Engine Super CD-ROM² and later re-released for the Wii's Virtual Console, taking place ten years after the events of the first game. In 1998, a portable entry titled Nectaris GB was also released for the Game Boy and published by Hudson Soft in Japan. A remake, Military Madness: Nectaris, was released for WiiWare, Xbox Live Arcade and PlayStation Network in 2010. An iOS version, Military Madness: Neo Nectaris, was also released in February 2010. The game was cited as one of the key influences on the seminal 1992 real-time strategy game Dune II.

== Neo Nectaris ==
In 1994 Hudson Soft released a sequel/remake of Nectaris for the PC-Engine Super System CD² called Neo Nectaris. Neo Nectaris covers the events of the first game but then escalates to Mars, featuring new enemies known as Bioheiki as well as several other changes. It was never released in North America due to the discontinuation of the TurboGrafx-16 line in the region.

There is an English port of the game for iOS from 2010, but the game's AI does not work properly.
