= Bomberman (1990 video game) =

- North American TurboGrafx-16 box art
- Developer: Hudson Soft (Note: X68000 version developed by SystemSoft; Amiga version developed by Actionamics; MS-DOS version developed by Hurricane.)
- Publishers: Hudson Soft: TurboGrafx-16; JP: Hudson Soft; NA: NEC X68000 SystemSoft Amiga, Atari ST, MS-DOS Ubisoft
- Designer: Tsukasa Kuwahara
- Composer: Jun Chikuma
- Series: Bomberman
- Platforms: TurboGrafx-16, X68000, Amiga, Atari ST, MS-DOS
- Release: 7 December 1990: TurboGrafx-16; JP: 7 December 1990; NA: April 1991 X68000; JP: April 1991 Amiga; FRA: January 1992; EU: April 1992 Atari ST; FRA: January 1992; EU: January 1993 MS-DOS; FRA: January 1992; EU: 1992
- Genres: Action, maze, party
- Modes: Single-player, multiplayer

Bomberman (Note: Japanese: ボンバーマン, Hepburn: Bonbāman), also known as Dyna Blaster in Europe, is a 1990 action game developed and published by Hudson Soft for the TurboGrafx-16. An entry in the Bomberman franchise, it is a reimagining of the first game in the series. The game was later ported to home computers, each one featuring changes compared to the original version. The game garnered positive reception from critics since its initial release on the TurboGrafx-16 and later on home computers.

== Gameplay ==

Top: Story mode gameplay.
Bottom: Multiplayer battle mode.
(TurboGrafx-16 version shown)

=== Single-player ===
The player takes on the role of White Bomberman on a quest to rescue Lisa, the kidnapped daughter of his inventor Dr. Mitsumori, from the castle of Black Bomberman while defeating evil monsters and villains that work for him.

The single player game is divided into eight worlds, each one divided into eight stages. Each stage is presented as a maze of blocks filled with enemies. By using bombs, the player must destroy the blocks blocking their path and defeat all of the enemies. Once all of the enemies are defeated and the hidden exit is uncovered, the player can proceed to the next stage. Each stage also includes one power-up hidden under one of the blocks, which can increase the number of bomb drops, increase the range of the bombs' explosions, and other useful powers. The eighth stage in each world is a boss battle.

=== Multiplayer ===
The game also includes a multi-player mode which allows up to five players to compete against one another (requires the use of a TurboGrafx-16 Multitap). This mode plays identically to the single-player mode, with the exception of power-ups being limited to only Bombs and Fire. There is also an alternate multi-player mode, Skull Mode, in which skulls sometimes appear hidden beneath blocks, which are detrimental if picked up.

== Development ==
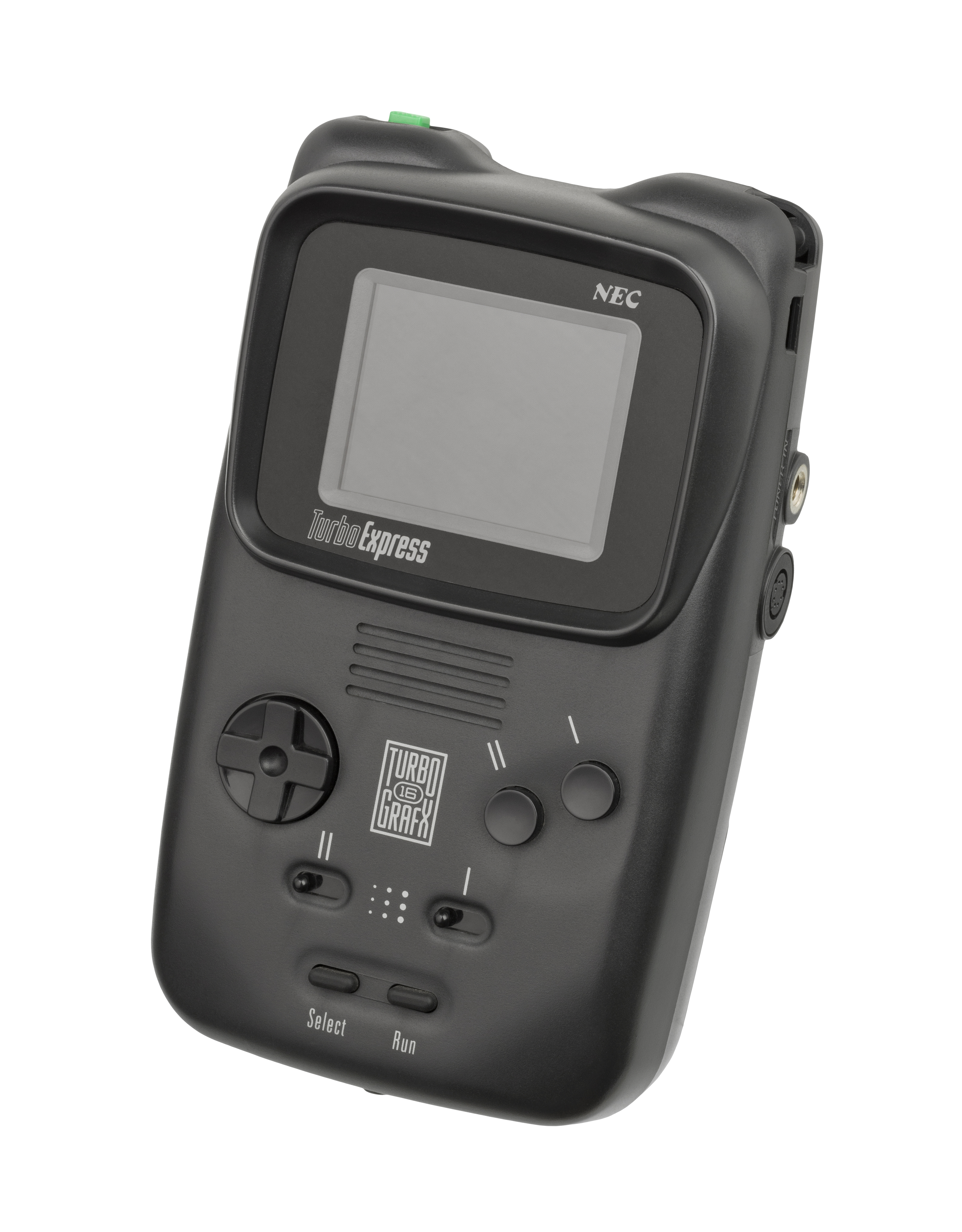
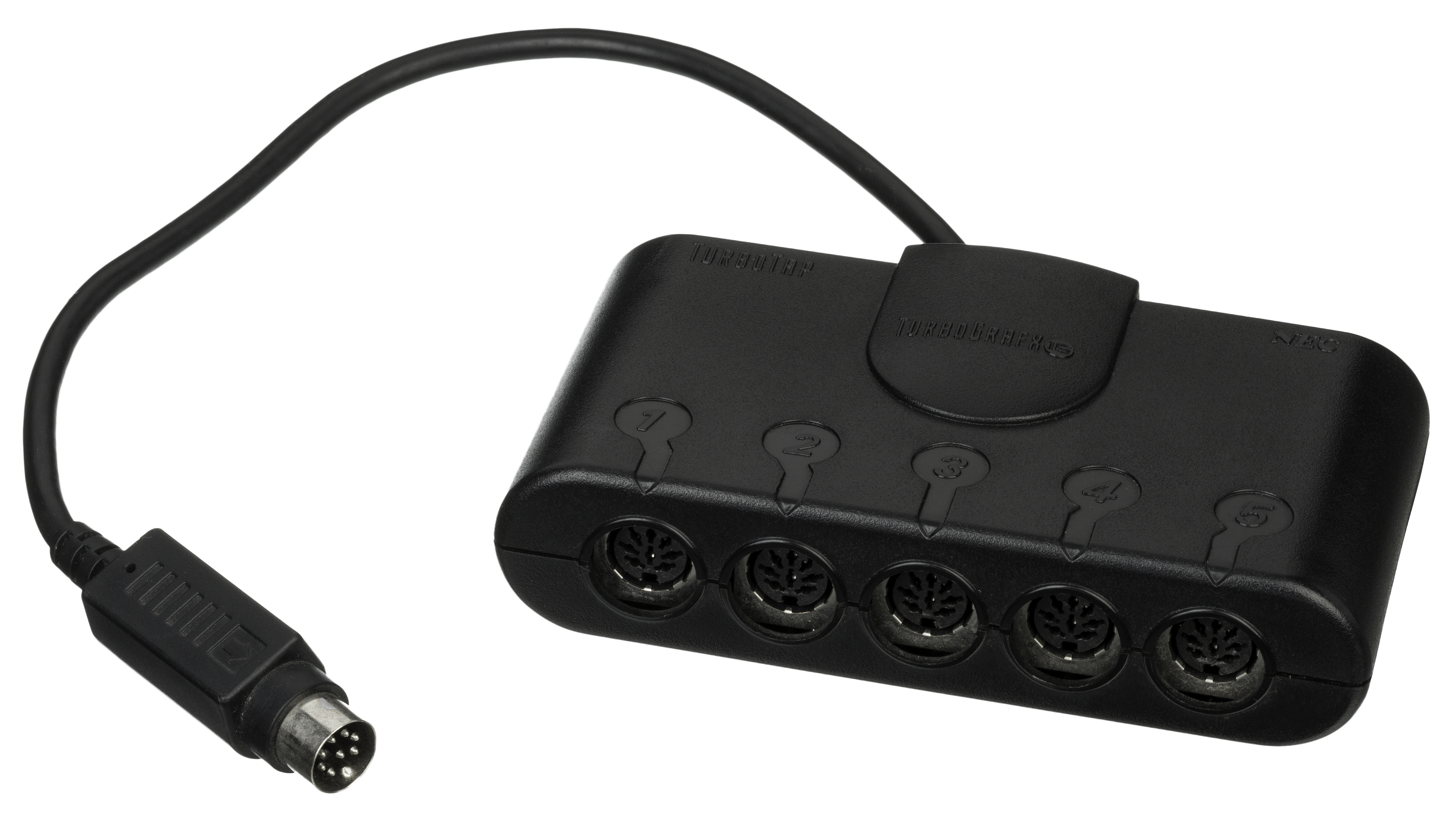
The TurboExpress handheld console (left) and the TurboTap (right).

Bomberman was developed by Hudson Soft. Some time after publishing Bomberman (1985) for the Nintendo Entertainment System, which was an enhanced port of an earlier computer game Bakudan Otoko (1983), developers at Hudson began discussion for porting it to the PC Engine, the Japanese version of the TurboGrafx-16. The PC Engine was a video game console produced and released in 1987 as a collaborative effort between Hudson Soft and Japanese manufacturer NEC. It ultimately led to the Bomberman series' first console title not to be published for Nintendo consoles. The departure was likely because Hudson Soft now had a partial stake in the "console wars" at the time.

The move to the PC Engine proved to be beneficial for Hudson developers thanks to the console's flexible multiplayer support. Not only could it support a two-player cooperative gameplay with a link-up mode via two PC Engine GT handheld consoles (TurboExpress in North America), its multitap peripherals allowed designing the battle mode where up to five players can fight one another simultaneously. Kazuhiko Nonaka, vice president of CC Production Division at Hudson, recalled the developers were so absorbed with playing the prototype's battle mode that it started to affect the production. Based on the employees' reactions, Hudson became confident that it would become a hit among the Japanese press and public. Nakamoto Shinichi, the creator of Bomberman (1985) and Hudson's research and development director, was grateful that the PC Engine had a multitap because, without it, the PC Engine version of Bomberman would have been a mere reproduction of the earlier Bomberman games.

Bomberman for the PC Engine was designed by Tsukasa Kuwahara, later the designer of Bomberman '93 on the same console. The soundtrack was composed by Jun Chikuma, who incorporated the melodies of the music from Bomberman (1985).

== Release ==
Bomberman was released in Japan by Hudson Soft on 7 December 1990. It was published in North America by NEC in April 1991. The North American version was given a box art depicting Bomberman as a realistic-looking human in a costume, which Hardcore Gaming 101 compared to the "Bad Box Art Mega Man" from Mega Man.

Hudson Soft reprinted Bomberman in a special HuCard cartridge under the title Bomberman Users Battle, which only contained the multiplayer modes. It was handed out for free to participants of the events hosted in Japan by Hudson. Bomberman was re-released in North America via a 4-in-1 pack-in disc for the TurboDuo alongside Bonk's Adventure, Bonk's Revenge, and Gate of Thunder. It is accessed by entering a code in the game menu. Bomberman was also included in Bomberman Collection Vol. 1, a compilation for Windows using emulation. It was released in North America in November 2002 and Japan on 5 December 2002. It was published in South Korea by AK Communications on 30 June 2002.

=== Computer ports ===
The X68000 version was developed and published by SystemSoft. It was released in Japan in April 1991.

In Europe, the game was released for the Amiga, Atari ST and MS-DOS by Ubi Soft. The European computer versions were re-named into Dynablaster. According to Saturn Power, it was because of the British distributors receiving complaints from news media, which claimed the original name encouraged bombings. A Commodore 64 version was announced, but never released. It was cancelled due to the platform's diminishing market share at the time.

== Reception ==
=== PC Engine/TurboGrafx-16 ===
Reception

Review scores
Publication	Score
Computer and Video Games	93%
Famitsu	29/40
Raze	89%
VG&CE	7/10

Bomberman on the PC Engine/TurboGrafx-16 garnered positive reception from critics since its release. Computer and Video Games's Paul Glancey and Richard Leadbetter praised the visuals, music, gameplay and multiplayer. Japanese readers of the magazine PC Engine Fan voted to give the game a 23.78 out of 10 score, ranking at the number 51 spot, indicating a large popular following. Bomberman on the TurboGrafx-16 was included in the 2010 book 1001 Video Games You Must Play Before You Die.

Raze noted that "Bomber Man is good in one player mode, but really come into its own with two or more players", stating that the magazine's staff played the multiplayer mode daily. VideoGames & Computer Entertainment's Joshua Mandel commended the cartoony graphics and sound effects but criticized the single-player's short length.

=== Amiga ===
The Amiga conversion of Bomberman, published under the title Dyna Blaster, was a popular game on the platform specifically the battle mode with 5 players was played throughout computer clubs was a new thing in 1991. Dyna Blaster also received critical acclaim from reviewers. Amiga Action's Jason Simmons praised the graphics, sound and combination of puzzle and arcade elements, stating that "the simplest games are often the best and this is definitively the case with Dyna Blaster." Amiga Computing's Daniel Whitehead praised the colorful graphics, sound design, gameplay and multiplayer, though Whitehead noted that "single players may feel a bit neglected, though." Amiga Format's Linda Barker commended the simple but colorful graphics, addictive gameplay and multiplayer, however Barker criticized the sound design. Amiga Mania's Ashley Cotter-Cairns praised the fast gameplay, sound and graphics but criticized the longevity of the game, stating that "Dynablaster won't hold your attention for very long. But get some friends and a few four packs in and you're guaranteed a great evening's bombing." Amiga Power's Matt Bielby highly praised the multiplayer aspect, regarding it as a "PC Engine perfect conversion" but noted the title's high retail price due to the included multitap adapter.

CU Amiga's Dan Slingsby praised the graphics, sound, longevity, playability and frantic multiplayer but admitted that the stages in single player mode eventually become boring. Likewise, Computer and Video Games's Frank O'Connor commended the visuals, sound, playability and longevity as well as the multiplayer. Zero's Martin Pond commented positively about the visuals, sound, addictive gameplay and overall execution.

=== Other versions ===
The X68000 version of Bomberman obtained critical acclaim from critics. Yoshida Kenji of Japanese magazine Oh!X praised the presentation and gameplay. Japanese publication Technopolis also praised the X68000 version highly.

The Atari ST port of Bomberman was also met with critical acclaim from reviewers. ST Action's Jason Dutton praised the visuals, sound, gameplay and multiplayer. Likewise, ST Format's Rob Mead commended the presentation, pacing, gameplay and multiplayer but criticized the controls for being unresponsive. ST Review's Wayne Legg gave high remarks to the graphics, sound and playability, though he criticized the initial simplicity but regarded it as "one of the best games on the ST".

== Legacy ==
Bomberman on the TurboGrafx-16 is considered highly influential to the overall franchise, having formulated its multiplayer battle mode. While the multiplayer mode was first introduced in Atomic Punk, it was Bomberman that implemented the option to include up to five players with a TurboTap multitap accessory. The increased number of players drastically changed the dynamic of the battle mode, urging them to employ both defensive and offensive strategies while fighting in the same arena. Writing for Nintendo Power, Casey Loe said that, thanks to the TurboGrafx-16 and its TurboTap accessory, Bomberman was transformed "from a lonely puzzle game into one of the greatest party-game series of all time". Ian Higton of Eurogamer regarded the battle mode in Bomberman as an antecedent of the last man standing mechanic in battle royale games like Player Unknown's Battlegrounds.

Bomberman was also the first attempt to expand on its universe, marking the first appearance of the recurring protagonist, White Bomberman, and his arch nemesis, Black Bomberman. Black Bomberman would continue to show up in the narrative of future Bomberman games, with his role gradually shifted from villain to White Bomberman's rival to his close friend, serving as the secondary playable character.

With the winning formula in place, Hudson would keep refining it over the coming years. By 2009, there had been 66 Bomberman titles released for various platforms, not counting spin-offs. Toshiyuki Takahashi, a Hudson spokesman, said in 2009, "When the game was ported to PC-Engine, you could say this was the beginning of the Bomberman that you see now."

The 1990 Bomberman was followed up with two sequels on the same platform, Bomberman '93 (1992) and Bomberman '94 (1993). Bomberman '94 remained a Japan-only release until it was released for the Virtual Console service.
