= Military Madness: Nectaris =

2009 video game

- Developer: Backbone Entertainment
- Publisher: Hudson Soft
- Series: Nectaris
- Platforms: WiiWare, Xbox Live Arcade, PlayStation Network
- Release: September 30, 2009: Xbox Live Arcade September 30, 2009 PlayStation Network; NA: November 5, 2009; JP: November 18, 2009; PAL: January 7, 2010 WiiWare; JP: February 9, 2010; PAL: March 12, 2010; NA: April 12, 2010
- Genre: Turn-based strategy
- Modes: Single-player, multiplayer

Military Madness: Nectaris is a turn-based strategy game developed for WiiWare, Xbox Live Arcade and PlayStation Network by Hudson Soft. It is the latest game in the Nectaris series, and an enhanced remake of the first game.

Nectaris has the maps as the original, but features 3D graphics, new units, a new story and online co-op and competitive multiplayer modes for up to four players. Hudson claimed that all three versions are identical, save for a few multiplayer maps omitted in the WiiWare version.

The WiiWare version was discontinued in March 2012. The PlayStation Network version was delisted in Europe in 2017.

== Reception ==
Reception

Aggregate score
Aggregator	Score		
Aggregator	PS3	Wii	Xbox 360
Metacritic	69/100	69/100	65/100

Review scores
Publication	Score		
Publication	PS3	Wii	Xbox 360
GamePro	N/A	N/A	2.5/5
GameSpot	N/A	N/A	5.5/10
IGN	6.9/10	6.9/10	6.9/10
NGamer	N/A	60%	N/A
Nintendo Life	N/A	8/10	N/A
Official Nintendo Magazine	N/A	74%	N/A
Official Xbox Magazine (US)	N/A	N/A	6.5/10
TeamXbox	N/A	N/A	7.4/10
411Mania	6.5/10	N/A	N/A
Teletext GameCentral	N/A	N/A	6/10

The game received "mixed or average reviews" on all platforms according to the review aggregation website Metacritic.
