= Bomberman World =

1998 video game

- North American cover art
- Developer: Hudson Soft
- Publishers: JP: Hudson Soft; NA: Atlus; PAL: Sony Computer Entertainment
- Director: Shigeki Fujiwara
- Producer: Hiroaki Baba
- Designers: Takashi Minami; Shigeki Fujiwara
- Artist: Shoji Mizuno
- Composers: Hironao Yamamoto; Jun Chikuma
- Series: Bomberman
- Platforms: PlayStation, PC
- Release: PlayStation: JP: January 29, 1998; PAL: August 1998; NA: September 22, 1998; PC: JP: December 19, 2002; NA: March 24, 2003
- Genres: Action, maze
- Modes: Single-player, multiplayer

Bomberman World (Note: ボンバーマンワールド, Bonbāman Wārudo) is a maze action video game developed and published by Hudson Soft for the PlayStation. It is part of the Bomberman series. The game was also re-released for PCs in 2002 alongside the TurboGrafx-16 version of Bomberman and Bomberman '93 as part of a compilation disc titled Bomberman Collection.

== Plot ==
Long ago, there were four evil Bombers known as the Dark Force Bombers who sought to plunge the Bomberman world into darkness. The ancient ancestors of the Bombermen managed to stop them by imprisoning the Dark Force Bombers within the Blue Crystal. Millions of years later, Bagular, appearing from another point in the time-space continuum, destroyed the Blue Crystal, thus freeing the villains. The freed bombers became Bagular's minions and conquered the four worlds. It is now up to Bomberman to save the worlds from evil.

== Gameplay ==
=== Story Mode ===
The goal is to complete all five areas of the five different Bomber worlds. To complete the areas, the player must control Bomberman and set bombs to destroy enemies and obstacles that will lead to the exit. To be able to complete each level, the player must locate and pick up all of the Crystals on the map. Once this is complete, the door to the exit will open, and the player is allowed to move on to the next area. In the fourth area of each world, the player will have to defeat a Dark Force Bomber, and an extra boss that is themed after the type of world the setting is in.

Once the player defeats a Dark Force Bomber, the player is given a unique battle armor to wear for the next boss battle, which has a normal attack and a special attack. The battle armor is only used for the boss battles, meaning once the player advances to the next world, the battle armor will be lost.

=== Multiplayer ===
In multiplayer mode, the last one standing is the winner. Set bombs to destroy other bombers. There are different modes to play at, such as "Single Match" and "Maniac Mode", and the player or players are able to choose one of ten different unique maps to battle on, each map having a different twist and theme to the gameplay. The objective is to blow up blocks or obstacles to be able to advance towards other bombers and catch them with the fire from a bomb. When obstacles are blown up, items frequently drop from them.

==== Single Match ====
Single Match is a basic game in which five Bombers are on a map chosen before the game starts. The player can choose "Tag Match" or "Battle Royal", with Tag Match being able to choose two teams to fight, and Battle Royal for a free-for-all on all five players. There are other options that can be determined, like number of rounds to win in order to win altogether, time limit for each round, Sudden Death, Bad Bomber, and others. Sudden Death happens once a certain amount of time has passed, and the map starts to fall apart rapidly, killing any player who is standing on a space that disappears. Bad Bomber is an option that allows a defeated player to hover around the edge of the map and shoot bombs onto the map in hopes of taking out other Bombers. Setting the Bad Bomber option to "Super" results in the event that a Bad Bomber kills a Bomber, that Bad Bomber will come back to life.

==== Maniac Mode ====
Maniac Mode is another multi-player game setting, in which the players choose which items they want to have appear on the field, and how many. Possibilities range from having maximum fire matches with other players, or merely a max amount of bombs with no firepower, as well as gaining special powers that cannot be obtained during normal Single Match play, such as the item that allows players to walk through walls.

=== Special Mode ===
This mode allows the player to play a special level with a predetermined amount of time to complete (only options are two-minutes and five-minutes), as well picking a selection of items to start with. There are three selections, each containing three different items, or amounts of a certain item. The object of the Special Mode is to rack up as many points as possible, done best by defeating numerous enemies within the same blast of a bomb, and picking up letters. Defeating the Boss at the end of the level yields a large number of bonus points. The game is over once the player dies, or defeats the boss.

When a game ends, the player is ranked on the number of points they acquired before they lost or won. Higher points will result in a positive ranking (like Good Bomber) and low points will result in a negative ranking (like Worst Bomber). It is unclear whether or not the rankings have anything to do with the game (because there is no High-Score board) other than being a self-accomplishment for the player to achieve the best ranking possible.

== Development ==
Bomberman World was shown at the September 1997 Tokyo Game Show under the title PlayStation Bomberman.

== Reception ==
Reception

Aggregate score
Aggregator	Score
GameRankings	60.67%

Review scores
Publication	Score
Computer and Video Games	2/5
Electronic Gaming Monthly	6/10
Famitsu	25/40
Game Informer	6.5/10
GameSpot	5.2/10
IGN	7.8/10
Official U.S. PlayStation Magazine	4/5
PlayStation: The Official Magazine	3/5
Arcade	3/5
Extreme PlayStation	83%
Gamers' Republic	D+
PlayStation Pro	8/10

According to Famitsu, Bomberman World sold over 76,801 copies in its first week on the market and sold approximately 217,101 copies during its lifetime in Japan. The game received an average reception from critics, holding a rating of 63.40% based on five reviews according to review aggregator website GameRankings. Both Dengeki PlayStation reviewers found the multiplayer mode exciting, but noted that the viewpoint made it difficult to judge distances and led to repeated mistakes, particularly in boss battles. They also said that the single-player mode was monotonous and commented that the previous installments were better. GamePro's Francis Mao praised the game's responsive controls, soundscapes, and crisp graphics, but felt that the angled perspective was not as effective as the direct camera view and that some backgrounds were too detailed to follow the on-screen action.
