= Pocket Bomberman =

1997 video game

- North American Game Boy Color cover art
- Developer: Hudson Soft
- Publishers: JP: Hudson Soft; WW: Nintendo
- Composers: Yoshio Tsuru; Jun Chikuma
- Series: Bomberman
- Platforms: Game Boy, Game Boy Color
- Release: Game Boy: JP: December 12, 1997; EU: 1998; Game Boy Color: NA: November 18, 1998; EU: 1998
- Genre: Platform game
- Mode: Single-player

Pocket Bomberman (Note: Japanese: ポケットボンバーマン, Hepburn: Poketto Bonbāman) is a platform video game developed by Hudson Soft and originally released for the Game Boy in 1997. It was re-released as a launch title for the Game Boy Color in 1998.

The game received generally positive reviews for its gameplay.

== Gameplay ==
In contrast to the overhead view of other Bomberman titles, Pocket Bomberman features sidescrolling platformer gameplay. Like other Bomberman games, Bomberman must defeat all enemies in each stage to advance. The game features a total of 5 worlds spanning 25 levels. Each world follows a different theme, including forest, underwater, cloudtops and a dark underworld. At the end of each world is a boss fight. There is one mini game called Jump Mode in which players must guide Bomberman through an Easy, Medium, or Hard course. Bomberman will constantly jump and the player can only place bombs in this mode.

== Development and release ==
Pocket Bomberman was developed by Hudson Soft and originally released for the Game Boy in 1997. It was re-released as a launch title for the Game Boy Color in 1998.

== Reception ==
Reception

Review scores
Publication	Score
AllGame	3.5/5
IGN	7/10
N64 Magazine	3/5
Nintendo Power	7.2/10

Pocket Bomberman received generally favorable reviews from critics. N64 Magazine described the game as somewhat repetitive, while IGN praised the different themes in each world because they add variety to the game. Nintendo Power editors praised its fun and challenging gameplay, and considered the Jump Mode innovative.
