= Bomberman (2006 video game) =

- North American cover art
- Developer: Hudson Soft
- Publishers: JP: Hudson Soft; WW: Konami
- Director: Takahide Otoizumi
- Producer: Yukihiro Kobayashi
- Composer: Hideki Sakamoto
- Series: Bomberman
- Platform: PlayStation Portable
- Release: JP: July 20, 2006; NA: September 12, 2006; EU: February 9, 2007; AU: February 16, 2007
- Genre: Strategy
- Modes: Single-player, multiplayer

Bomberman, known in Japan as Bomberman Portable (ボンバーマンポータブル, Bonbāman Pōtaburu), is a strategy maze video game developed by Hudson Soft and published by Konami for the PlayStation Portable handheld console. It was released in Japan in July 2006, in North America in September 2006, and in the PAL regions in February 2007. It was initially released as simply Bomberman outside Japan, but later released in North America as Bomberman Legacy.

== Gameplay ==
Players must navigate a series of levels, defeating enemies by blowing them up with Bomberman's infinite supply of bombs. Unlike previous games, power-ups are added to an inventory to be used when the player wishes, rather than activated immediately upon collection. Power-ups in the player's inventory are carried over should the player lose a life, but those which have been used have their effects canceled. A total of 18 different power-ups are available in the game.

== Reception ==
Reception

Aggregate score
Aggregator	Score
Metacritic	73/100

Review scores
Publication	Score
Electronic Gaming Monthly	6.33/10
Eurogamer	6/10
Famitsu	26/40
GamePro	3.75/5
GameSpot	7.5/10
GameSpy	3.5/5
GameZone	7.5/10
IGN	7/10
Official U.S. PlayStation Magazine	8/10
Pocket Gamer	3.5/5

The game received "mixed or average reviews" according to the review aggregation website Metacritic. In Japan, Famitsu gave it a score of two sevens and two sixes for a total of 26 out of 40.
