= Saturn Bomberman =

1996 video game

- North American cover art
- Developer: Hudson Soft
- Publishers: JP: Hudson Soft; WW: Sega
- Directors: Shigeki Fujiwara; Kazunori Yasui
- Producer: Hiroshi Igari
- Designers: Tatsumitsu Watanabe; Yōhei Nakata
- Artists: Shoji Mizuno; Naoto Yoshimi
- Composer: Jun Chikuma
- Series: Bomberman
- Platform: Sega Saturn
- Release: JP: July 19, 1996; EU: May 1, 1997; NA: September 4, 1997
- Genres: Action, maze
- Modes: Single-player, multiplayer

Saturn Bomberman (Note: Japanese: サターンボンバーマン, Hepburn: Satān Bonbāman) is an action game by Hudson Soft for the Sega Saturn, hence the game's title. The eleventh installment in the Bomberman series, it was first released in Japan on July 19, 1996, in Europe on May 1, 1997, and in North America on September 4, 1997. It is best known for its multiplayer functionality for up to ten players using multitaps. It received praise for its gameplay and multiplayer, but criticism for not advancing the Bomberman series enough.

== Gameplay ==
Like most Bomberman games, Saturn Bomberman features a battle mode as well as a story mode. Along with them is a master mode in which the player races to finish a series of levels after which the player is given a rank based on how much time is taken. This time is then saved to memory and kept on a scoreboard for future reference. The game also features several new powerups.

Saturn Bomberman utilises Dinosaur helpers, which are initially found as eggs released upon the destruction of a soft block. Dinosaurs come in three levels: babies (the weakest), adolescents, and adults (the strongest). Dinosaurs can only take one hit no matter how large they are. If a player is riding a dinosaur when this happens, the dinosaur takes the hit instead of the player. As powerups are collected, a special meter at the top of the screen slowly builds up. Once this meter is full, the dinosaur will grow one level, from baby to adolescent or adolescent to adult. However, in battle mode this system works differently. Whenever a player collects an egg while riding on a dinosaur, the dinosaur will grow. The player can jump off of the dinosaur at any time.

=== Story mode ===
Saturn Bomberman has a story mode which can be played single player or two-player. The story mode levels involve blowing up poles with glowing red orbs on the top (which are known as Zarfs) while avoiding (or destroying) enemies, blowing up blocks and collecting powerups. Once all the Zarfs on a level have been destroyed, an exit appears. Upon entering the exit, Bomberman will do a victory pose, then a short cut scene takes place. The cut scene shows a piece of scenery moving out of the way, then Bomberman walks through, and something closes up the way he came from. After the cut scene, the next level begins.

=== Battle mode ===
Saturn Bomberman supports up to ten human players on battle mode with 2 multitaps, 6 players with just one multitap, or two players without any multitaps. It is also possible to combat against CPU-controlled opponents in battle mode. If the number of players in a game exceeds eight, the game is played on a widescreen arena, shrinking the characters and blocks to tiny proportions, making the playing field very large. This also disables many of the powerups, including dinosaurs. The North American version also supports the Sega NetLink for up to four player online via two players per console.

== Development and promotion ==
Saturn Bomberman was initially promoted under the working title Bomberman SS. A December 1995 preview in Sega Saturn Magazine reported that development was approximately 20% complete. The early version already featured the game's time-travel premise, in which Bomberman travels between different worlds to recover stolen crystals.

The game was showcased during the 1996 Tokyo Toy Show, with contemporary previews highlighting its multiplayer functionality and newly introduced characters. In June 1996, Sega Saturn Magazine reported that development had reached 80% completion. The magazine described three principal modes: a traditional story-based game, a competitive battle mode supporting up to ten simultaneous players, and a score-focused Master mode.

Further previews detailed the game's dinosaur helpers, additional battle rules and time-travel stages. By July 1996, Sega Saturn Magazine reported that development was 100% complete, ahead of the game's Japanese release on July 19.

Following its release, Sega Saturn Magazine advertised a rank-certification competition associated with the game, offering Bomberman-themed prizes to participants.

== Reception ==
Reception

Aggregate score
Aggregator	Score
GameRankings	83% (6 reviews)

Review scores
Publication	Score
Electronic Gaming Monthly	9/10, 9.5/10, 9.5/10, 9/10
Famitsu	7/10, 6/10, 7/10, 7/10
GameSpot	7.8/10
Next Generation	3/5
Digitiser	95%
Saturn Power	91/100
Sega Saturn Magazine	90%

Award
Publication	Award
Electronic Gaming Monthly	Saturn Game of the Year, Multiplayer Game of the Year

=== Reviews ===
Critics were generally positive over Saturn Bomberman. It received enthusiastic reviews from Electronic Gaming Monthly's four-person "review crew", Saturn Power's Dean Mortlock, and Sega Saturn Magazine's Matt Yeo, who were particularly impressed with the ten-player capability and the numerous modes and options. Yeo also praised the game's accessibility, remarking, "Mastering power-ups and building on that initial buzz certainly adds to the game's broad appeal but the fact that players can simply pick up a joypad and leap straight into the thick of things with the minimum of tuition is the real winning factor." However, a reviewer for Next Generation and Jeff Gerstmann of GameSpot both felt the game failed to break out from the shadow of Super Bomberman 2. Gerstmann elaborated, "Since that classic game, every subsequent Bomberman game has closely mirrored it, while tacking on a few silly features that kept the game fresh without really adding anything useful. Saturn Bomberman combines all these silly features into one game, giving you what should be the ultimate Bomberman game. But any serious Bomberman player has seen all this before." Next Generation similarly opined that "the basic gameplay goodness of the series isn't tarnished, but nevertheless, the latest offering from Hudson Soft doesn't attain the classic status of SB2."

Critics were also not wholly sold on the 10-player feature, as most noted that the screen size used for ten players makes powerups and characters too small to discern on all but the largest television sets. They nonetheless concurred that the multiplayer modes overall are the highlight of the game. Dan Hsu of Electronic Gaming Monthly stated that "It's a mediocre one-player game. It's a fantastic multiplayer game. And that's all you really need to know." Mortlock ventured that it is "Probably the best multi-player game you'll ever play." GamePro noted that the screen is much less confusing if there are eight players or fewer, and commented, "If you don't have a Sega multitap, Saturn Bomberman offers the perfect excuse to get one. If you don't have friends, this is a good opportunity to get some of them, too."

The Story Mode and Master Mode were criticized by Matt Yeo for the frustratingly difficult AI and unforgiving boss fights, and GamePro similarly described them as "more a trial of your patience than a test of your skill." However, Next Generation contended that these modes are the one area where Saturn Bomberman actually exceeds Super Bomberman 2, as they "offer a decidedly less frantic (but more cerebral) puzzle-gamelike experience".

Critics generally remarked that the graphics and music are very limited and fail to advance the Bomberman series in any way. Most also complained at the excessive length of time between the game's original release in Japan and its release in North America and Europe.

Next Generation reviewed the Japanese version of the game as an import in 1996, rating it four stars out of five, and stated that "even a mediocre Bomberman game is still worth checking out, and a must for gregarious Saturn fans." In Japan, the game sold 129,616 units.

=== Accolades ===
In Electronic Gaming Monthly's 100th issue, Saturn Bomberman would tie with Castlevania: Symphony of the Night for Game of the Month. Later that year, the magazine would award Saturn Bomberman the 1997 Game of the Year awards for "Saturn Game of the Year" and "Multiplayer Game of the Year". The same year, Electronic Gaming Monthly listed it as the 10th best console video game of all time, remarking that while it was only slightly better than the Bomberman games for the older Super NES and TurboGrafx-16, it was nonetheless the best entry in the series to date.. Digitiser ranked it the second best Saturn game of 1997, below Fighters Megamix.

In 2008, IGN ranked Saturn Bomberman eight on their "Top 10 Sega Saturn Games" list, and in 2009 called it the best Bomberman game along with Bomberman '93. In 2012, GamesRadar ranked the game fourth on their "Best Saturn games of all time" list. In 2014, Retro Gamer placed the game on their "Top Ten Saturn Games" list.

== Legacy ==
Saturn Bomberman influenced the development of the cooperative puzzle-platform game Pico Park (2016). In a 2025 interview, developer Shunsuke Miyake identified Saturn Bomberman and The Legend of Zelda: Four Swords as inspirations for the original game.
