= Hiten (name) =

Hiten is an Indian masculine given name. Notable people with the name include:

- Hiten Tejwani (born 1974), Indian actor
- Hiten Paintal (born 1982), Indian actor
- Hiten Kumar, Indian actor
- Hiten Barman, Indian politician
- Hiten Dalal, Indian cricketer
