= Nectaris =

Video game series

Nectaris, occasionally released as Military Madness, is a series of sci-fi-themed, hex map turn-based strategy games for a variety of systems. The games were developed by Hudson Soft. The company was absorbed by Konami in 2012, and as a result Konami owns the rights to the series.

Games in the series include:

- Nectaris / Military Madness (PC Engine / TurboGrafx-16, 1989)
- Nectaris (PC 9800 & X68000, 1992)
- Neo Nectaris / Military Madness 2 (PC Engine CD, 1994)
- Nectaris (MS-DOS, 1995)
- Nectaris (Windows 95, 1997)
- Nectaris GB (Game Boy, February 1998)
- Nectaris (PlayStation, 1998), (PlayStation Network, 2008)
- Nectaris Cellular (i-mode, 2003)
- Military Madness (US cellphone (Verizon) v1.1)
- Military Madness: Nectaris (WiiWare, Xbox Live Arcade, PlayStation Network, 2009)
- Military Madness: Neo Nectaris (iPhone, 2010)
