= Multitap =

Type of video game console peripheral

A multitap is a video game console peripheral that increases the number of controller ports available to the player, allowing additional controllers to be plugged in simultaneously in a manner similar to a power strip or a USB hub. A multitap often takes the form of a box with three or more controller ports which is then connected to a controller port on the console itself.

The appeal of multitaps was focused mainly on sports games due to their multiplayer aspects, though some role-playing video games and first person shooters have taken advantage of multitap support as well. While historically strong, the demand for console-specific multitaps had largely vanished over the course of the seventh generation, where it became much more common for controllers to connect either wirelessly (removing the need for physical controller ports altogether) or through standard USB ports (allowing a USB hub to serve the same function as a multitap).

== History ==
=== Third generation ===
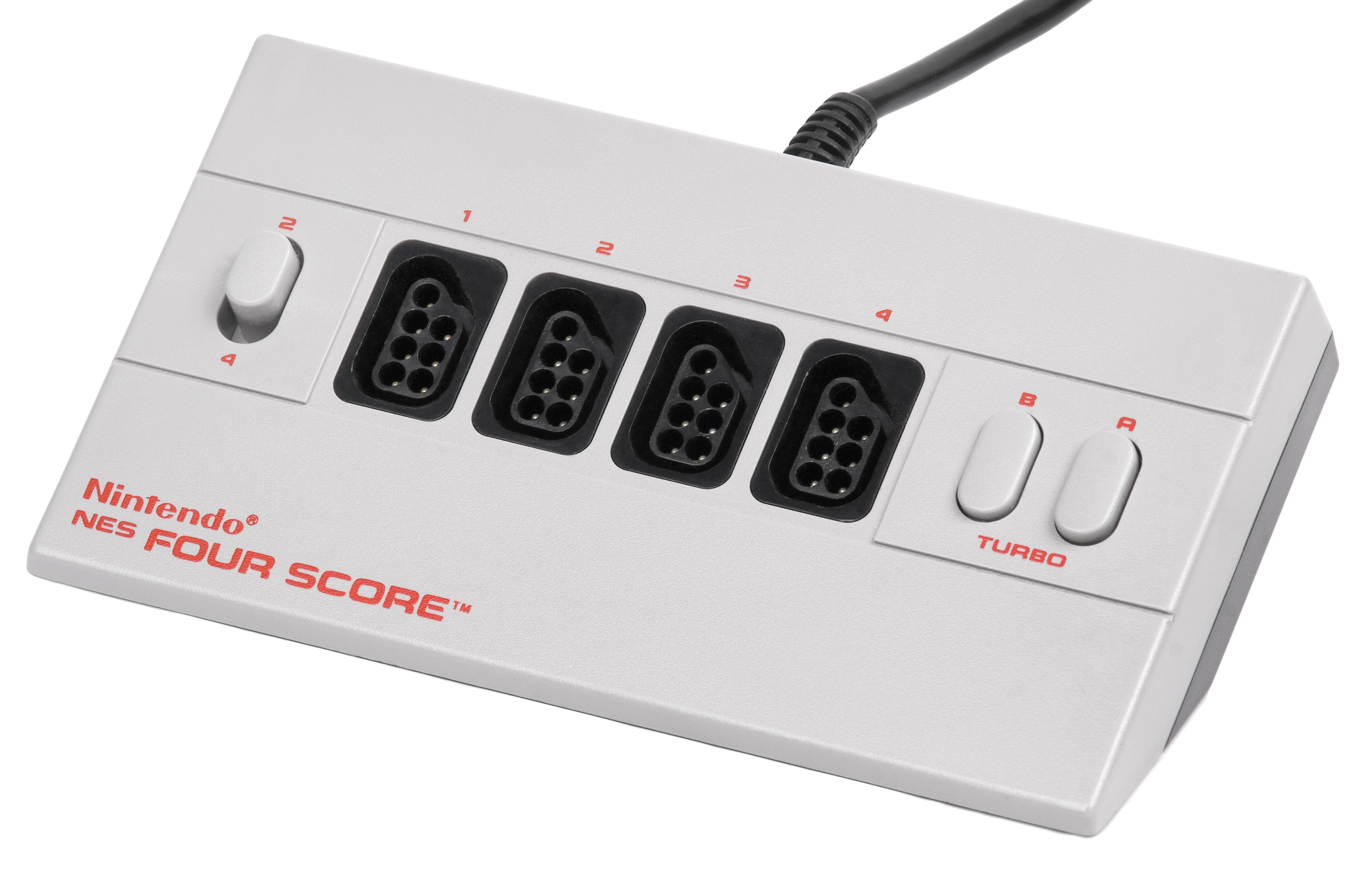
The Four Score for the original NES.

The earliest multi-controller adapter was the Joypair by HAL Laboratory, released in Japan for Nintendo's Family Computer in 1985, which allows two additional controllers to be plugged into the console's DA-15 expansion port. Originally the Joypair was only intended to allow two players to use specialized controllers (specifically HAL's Joyball controllers) in place of the standard Famicom joypads (which were hardwired into the console itself), but Nekketsu Kōkō Dodgeball Bu (the Japanese version of Super Dodge Ball) utilized it to allow up to four players to participate in the game's Bean Ball mode. (Note: The first Famicom game to support more than two players simultaneously was Konami's Moero TwinBee, released in 1986, in which a third player can participate by simply plugging a joypad into the expansion port without an adapter. The export version for the NES, titled Stinger, only allows up to two players.) Hori later released the Twin Adapter in 1989 as an alternative to the Joypair, while certain controllers (such as the ASCII Stick series and certain models of the Family Champ joysticks) came equipped with an additional expansion port that allowed for users to connect an additional controller into them. A more conventional 4-Players Adapter for the Famicom was eventually released by Hori in 1990, which allowed up to four controllers to be plugged into the expansion port (allowing each player to utilize a specialized joypad if they desired). During the same year, Nintendo released their own first-party adapters for the Nintendo Entertainment System in North America: the NES Four Score and the NES Satellite.

=== Fourth generation ===
The Multitap (the first device to be marketed with such a name) by NEC Home Electronics for the PC Engine, which launched alongside the platform in Japan on October 30, 1987, was the first multi-controller adapter made specifically for multiplayer support, allowing up to five controllers to be plugged into the console. Because the console itself only has one controller port as standard, the Multitap was a necessity for games that supported more than one player. As a result, various inexpensive alternatives to the Multitap were released for the PC Engine by third-party companies, such as the Battle Tap by Big Club and the Joy Tap 3 by Hudson Soft, which featured less controller ports than the first-party Multitap, but these were gradually phased out as more games started to allow up to five players. The first PC Engine game to allow more than two players simultaneously was Pro Tennis: World Court in August 1988 (ten months after the launch of the system), which allowed up to four players in a doubles match, while Dungeon Explorer in 1989 was the first game to fully allow up to five players. The Multitap was redesigned into the TurboTap for the North American market with the launch of the TurboGrafx-16 in 1989, and later as the DuoTap for the TurboDuo in 1992 (the different models were due to the change in controller ports between the TurboGrafx-16 and the TurboDuo).

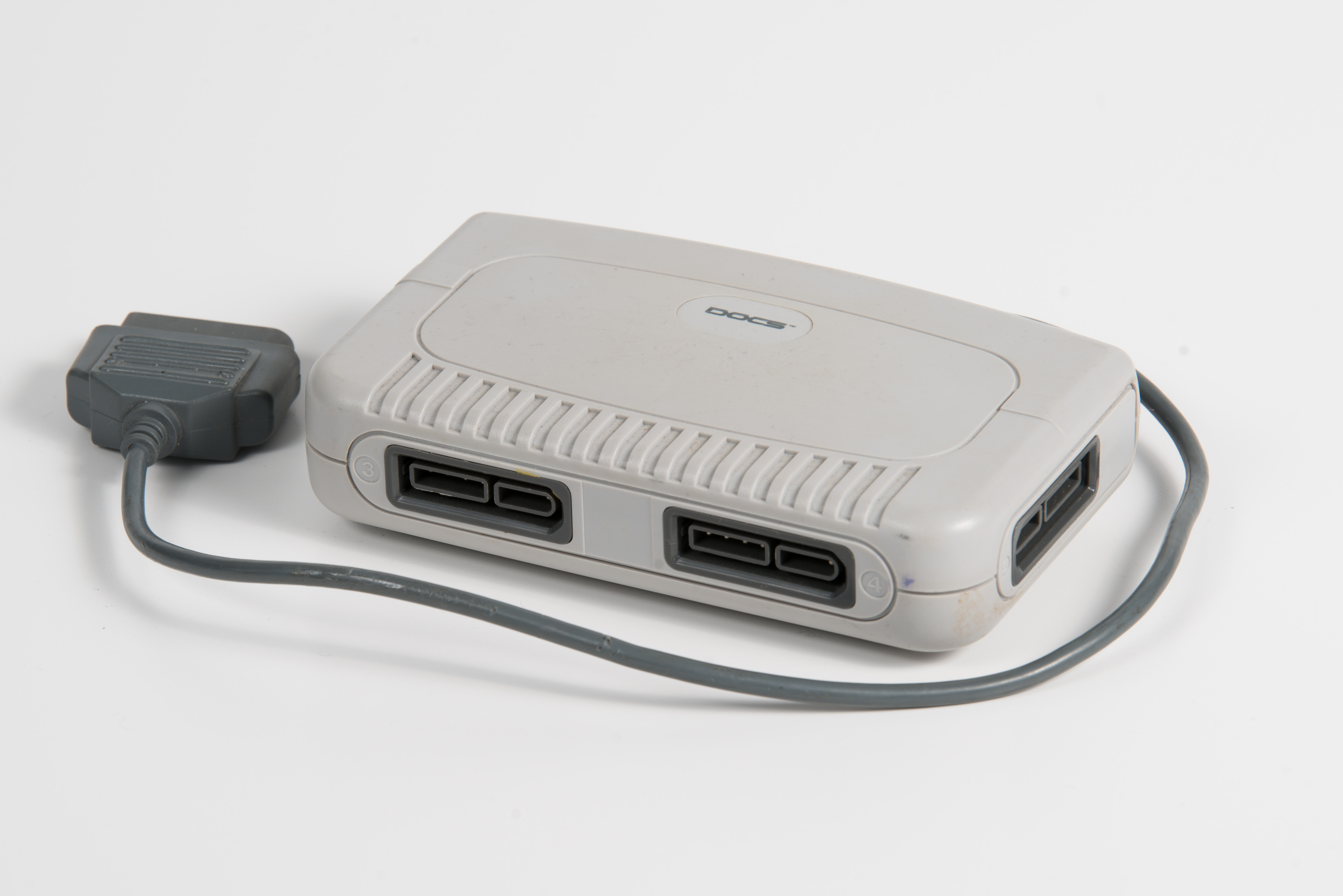
An unlicensed multitap for the Super NES.

Hudson Soft manufactured the Super Multitap, a multiplayer adapter for the Super NES in 1993. The adapter connects to the second controller port of the SNES control deck (leaving the first one free), resulting in a total of five controller ports (much like the original Multitap for the PC Engine). It was produced primarily for Super Bomberman, which had a prior installment on the PC Engine (simply titled Bomberman) that featured a five-player battle mode, although the SNES game only supported up to four players (the series did not support five players on the SNES until Super Bomberman 3, which was released only in Japan and the PAL region). The Super Multitap has a switch for 2P Mode and 5P Mode, allowing it to remain connected into the console without affecting incompatible games. While no Nintendo-produced version of the peripheral was ever produced (nor were there any first-party games that supported it), various other SNES multitaps were later produced by other companies (both, licensed and unlicensed) such as the Hori Multitap (released by Bullet-Proof Software in North America as the Super Links) and the Multi-Adaptor Auto. One particular unlicensed model, the Tribal Tap 6 Player Adaptor by Naki, added a fraudulent sixth controller port that was promoted as a selling point against competing multitap models, even though no licensed SNES game ever supported more than five players and the sixth racer of Battle Cross is always controlled by the computer.

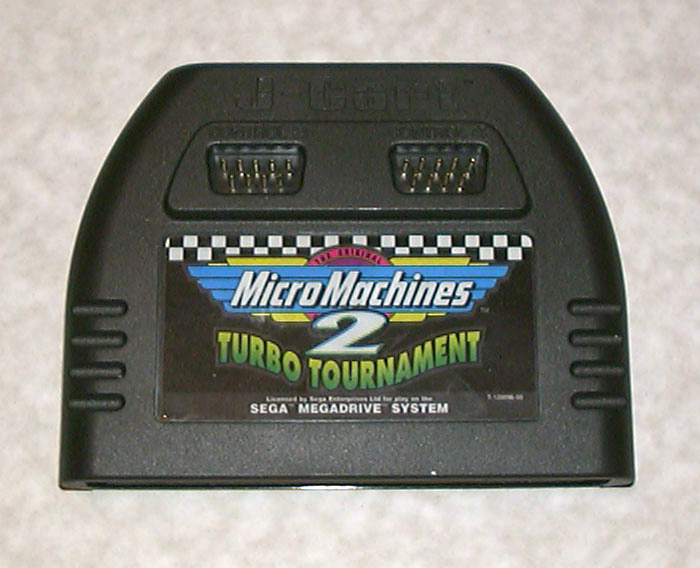
J-Cart with two built-in controller ports

Two independently developed multitaps were released for the Sega Genesis also in 1993. The 4-Way Play (which utilized both controller ports) was developed by Electronic Arts without license from Sega and was made specifically for their lineup of sports games (such as Madden NFL '94), whereas the Team Player (known as the SegaTap in Japan) was developed by Tengen for Gauntlet IV and sold by Sega as a first-party product. In contrast to the 4-Way Play, the Team Player only required one controller port (leaving an additional port free for a fifth player, much like the Super Multitap) and also acted as a splitter that allowed users to switch between multiple input devices (such as a mouse or a light gun) connected to the console at the same time. The original model of the Team Player (MK-1654) was incompatible with games that required the 4-Way Play, so a revision (MK-1647) was later produced that solved this issue by adding a second controller cord and an "Extra" setting for 4-Way Play compatibility. While most Team Player-compatible titles only supported up to four players (with some games such as Columns III supporting up to five), Konami's Double Dribble: The Playoff Season and Sega's Egawa Suguru's Super League CD (a Japan-exclusive baseball game for Mega CD) both allow up to eight players with the use of two Team Player adapters (one in each controller port). In addition to these multitaps, Codemasters released a series of Genesis cartridges known as the J-Cart with two additional controller ports installed on them, allowing users to plug in additional controllers on them without the need of an adapter. A total of six games were released in J-Cart format.

A few games released for the Amiga home computer system after 1995 included support for custom-built multitaps. Instructions for how to build a multitap were included in the manual to classic Amiga racing sequel Super Skidmarks. The Amiga multitap would plug into the computer's parallel port and provide two additional ports for use. Earlier, the Amiga version of Bomberman, Dynablaster had already included support for a similar device, as demonstrated on Season 2, Episode 5 of TV's GamesMaster.

=== Fifth generation ===
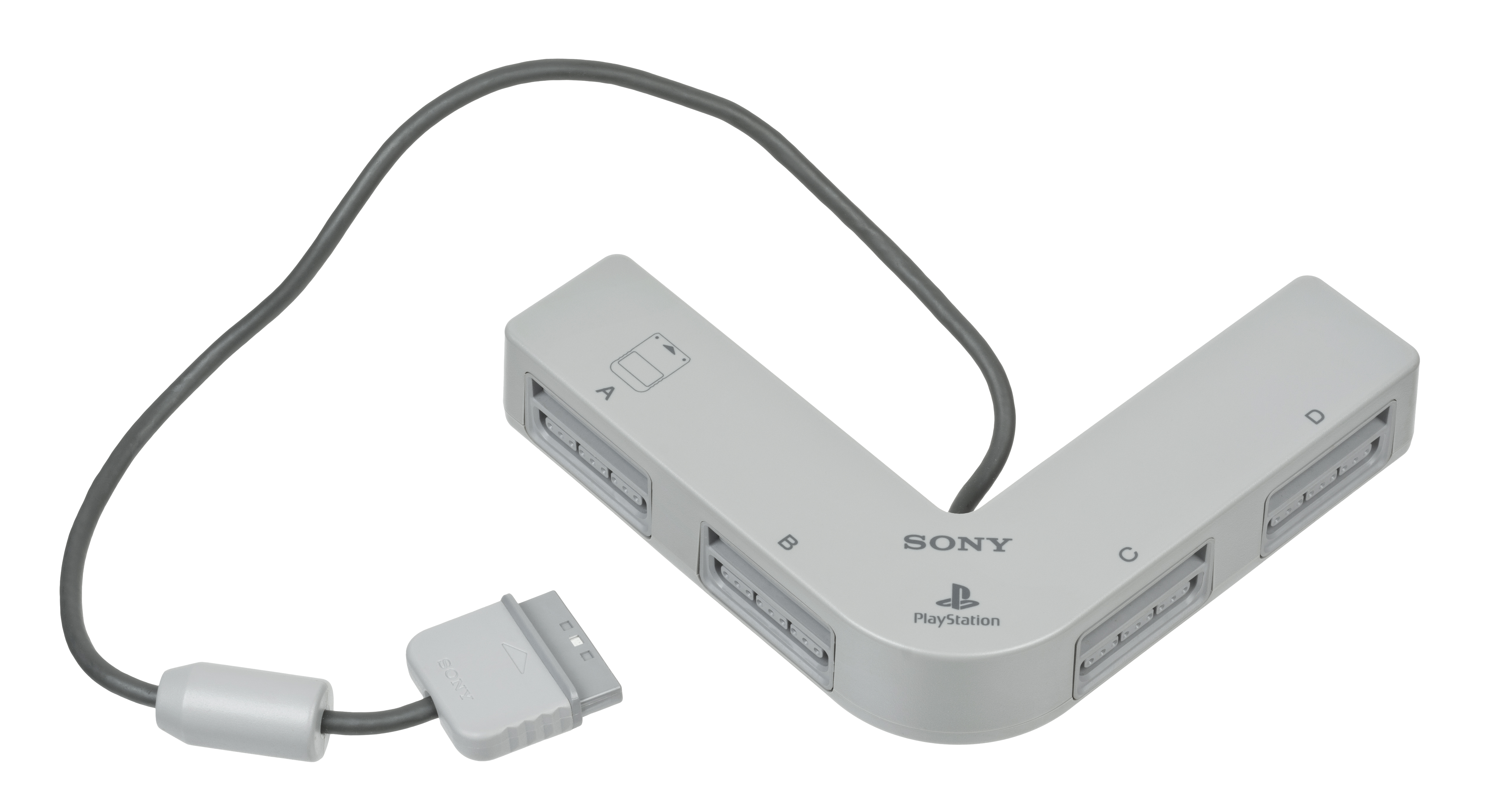
An official multitap for the PlayStation.

The original PlayStation Multitap was one of the earliest peripherals released for the platform. It featured not only four additional controller ports, but also four memory card slots for each of them as well. Like the Team Player adapter for the Genesis, two PlayStation Multitaps could be used at the same time for up to eight controllers and memory cards, although very few games allowed for more than five players.

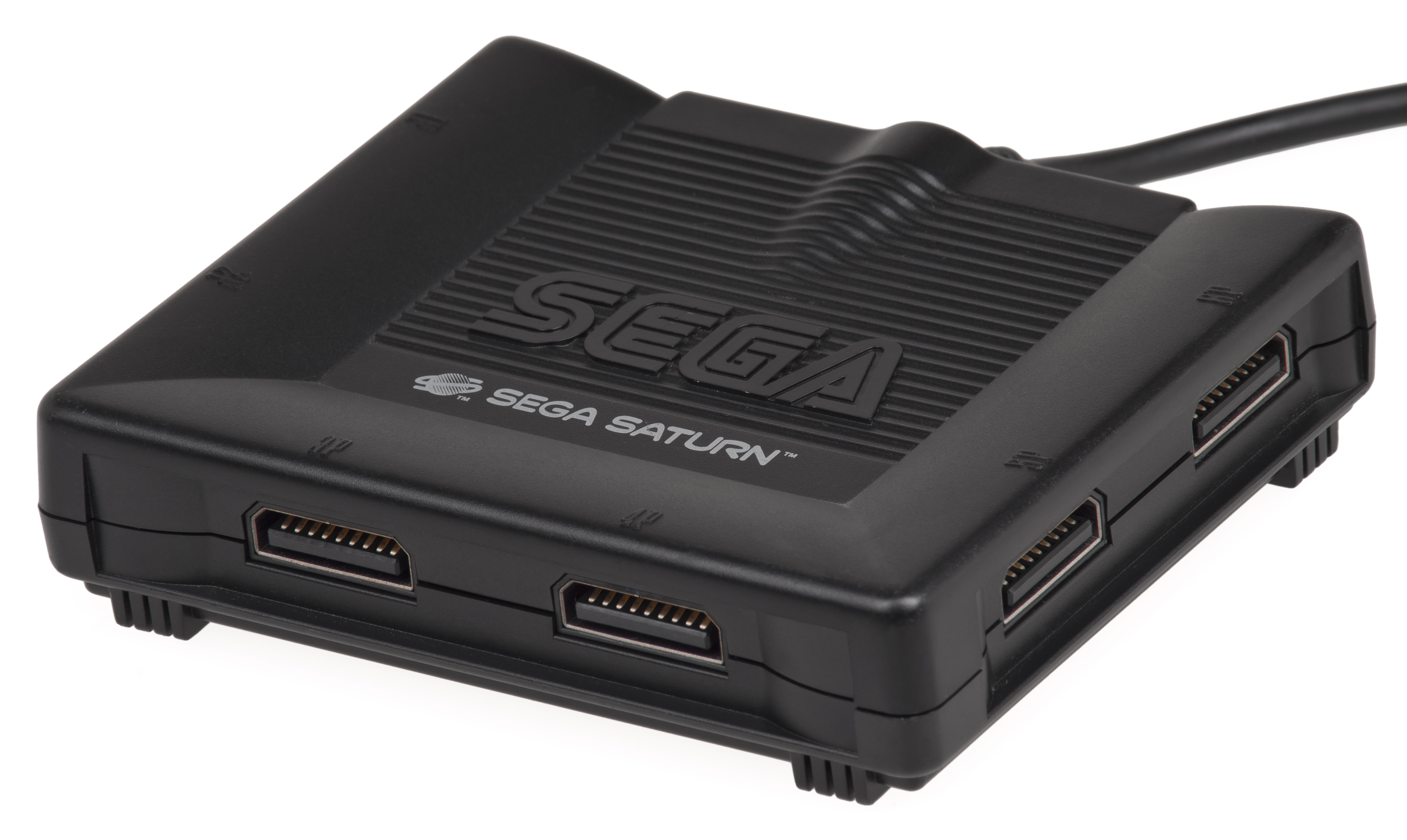
An official multitap for the Sega Saturn.

A six-controller adapter was released for the Sega Saturn (sold as the Multi-Player Adaptor in the United States and as the Multi Terminal 6 in Japan), which features the most controller ports out of all the multitaps made by first party manufacturers. The most famous Saturn game to make use of the multitap was Saturn Bomberman, which supports up to 10 players (requires two multitaps) simultaneously. A number of sports games such as NFL Quarterback Club 96 support the maximum of 12 players. The "Sega Saturn Multiplayer Task Force (SSMTF)" is a small but enthusiastic group of developers who have released homebrew games dedicated to utilizing the Saturn's multitap.

One of the first multitaps for personal computers, the Gravis Interface Protocol (officially abbreviated GrIP) from Advanced Gravis Computer Technology, has six ports, four for digital Gravis-brand gamepads (e.g. the Gravis PC GamePad), and two pass-through ports for analog joysticks.

=== Decline ===
The Nintendo 64 did not have any official multitaps released for it, as the console featured four controller ports by default (the first console to do so since the Bally Astrocade and the Atari 5200). As a result, many four-player games were released for the system. Dreamcast and the original Xbox would follow the N64's example by including four controller ports as default as well, as did Nintendo's succeeding console, the GameCube.

Despite this, the PlayStation 2 was released with only two controller ports like its predecessor, so a Multitap was still produced for the console. Because of compatibility issues, the original PS2 Multitap (SCPH-10090) for the early models of the console only worked specifically on PS2 games, meaning that the original PlayStation or PS one Multitap was still required for the games on the previous console. For the "slimline" model of the PS2, a new Multitap (SCPH-70120) was made that supported both, PS and PS2 games.

All three seventh generation consoles abandoned the use of conventional wired controller in favor of having wireless controllers as standard, although the maximum number of detected controllers varies with each platform. The Xbox 360 console can detect up to four wireless controllers, as well as three wired controllers via USB connection. The Wii, which uses a motion-sensitive remote controller known as the Wii Remote, could detect up to four wireless controllers, but also had four controller ports that were compatible with GameCube controllers. (Note: This was a requirement for certain TurboGrafx-16 games released on the Virtual Console, as the first controller port on the Wii is needed for the fifth player in games such as Bomberman and Dungeon Explorer.) The PlayStation 3 could support up to seven wireless controllers.

For the eighth generation consoles, the maximum number of wireless controllers detected by the PlayStation 4 was reduced to four, while the ones detected by the Xbox One was raised to eight. The Wii U can support up to seven Wii Remotes or Wii U Pro Controllers in addition to the GamePad, for a total of eight wireless controllers. The Wii U does not feature GameCube controller ports by default, but a GameCube Controller Adapter was primarily made for Super Smash Bros. for Wii U that connects up to four GameCube controllers via the Wii U's USB port. Through the use of a USB hub and two adapters, up to eight GameCube controllers can be used. The Nintendo Switch supports up to eight controllers, in any combination of individual Joy-Con controllers or Pro Controllers.

== Method of operation ==
Many systems were not designed with multitaps in mind, and so require some clever design to work. Because of this, games usually have to be specially written to include multitap support.

The most common way of implementing 8 and 16 bit multitaps is to multiplex the signals from each attached controller in some way. Some systems have unused lines available on the controller port, designed for future expansion, which can be used. Another popular technique is to serialise the data from each controller. Since the NES and Super NES both use a serial bus for standard controllers, creating a multitap is simply a case of increasing the amount of serial data available to the console. In that way, an almost unlimited number of extra controllers can be connected.

Later systems used more complex buses, such as the Nintendo 64 serial bus, the Dreamcast Maple Bus or USB. These buses tend to be more modular and can already support more than one device per port, making the multitap little more than a hub.

== See also ==
- Multiplayer video game
