= Bomberman '94 =

1993 video game

- Japanese PC Engine cover art
- Developers: Hudson Soft; Westone (MD/GEN)
- Publishers: Hudson Soft; Sega (MD/GEN)
- Director: Yoshiyuki Kawaguchi
- Producer: Hiroki Shimada
- Designer: Shinichi Nakamoto
- Artist: Shoji Mizuno
- Composer: Jun Chikuma
- Series: Bomberman
- Platforms: PC Engine, Sega Mega Drive/Genesis
- Release: PC Engine: JP: December 10, 1993; Mega Drive/Genesis: UK: November 23, 1994; NA: February 1995
- Genres: Action, maze
- Modes: Single-player, multiplayer

Bomberman '94 (ボンバーマン'94, Bonbāman kyūjūyon) is an action maze video game in the Bomberman series developed and published by Hudson Soft for the PC Engine and released on December 10, 1993, in Japan. It was later re-developed by Westone and re-published by Sega as Mega Bomberman on the Sega Mega Drive/Genesis in 1994 in other areas. The PC Engine Bomberman '94 was later released outside Japan through the Virtual Console and the PlayStation Network.

The game supports single-player and multi-player modes. In single player, the player navigates several levels of mazes, destroying creatures with bombs. In multiplayer mode, players defeat each other with bombs.

The Mega Drive/Genesis port had some differences. These differences include fewer options in multi-player, and some different music. For example, Jammin' Jungle's music in the original version was reused as the first level in Super Bomberman 4, but is entirely different in the other version.

The original Bomberman '94 was released for the Wii Virtual Console on December 2, 2006 in Japan, and was first made available outside Japan on March 23, 2009 in both the Americas and the PAL region.Bomberman '94 was released for the Wii U Virtual Console on November 19, 2014 in Japan, and on February 2, 2017 in North America and Europe. The previous game, Bomberman '93, was made available instead when Bomberman '94 was released in Japan's Virtual Console.

Bomberman '94 was released on the Japanese PlayStation Network on July 15, 2009, for play on the PlayStation 3 and PlayStation Portable. It was later released in North America on June 2, 2011.

== Plot ==
The inhabitants of Planet Bomber lived in peace, protected by five spirits, until the evil Bagular and his Robot Army invaded. The Spirit Pictures, the source of the spirits' magical power, were destroyed, splitting Planet Bomber into five pieces. Bomberman arrives to restore the Spirit Pictures and reassemble Planet Bomber.

== Gameplay ==
The game is set in six areas: Jammin' Jungle, Vexin' Volcano, Slammin' Sea, Crankin' Castle, Thrashin' Tundra and the artificial comet of Bagular. Due to the Mega Drive's and Genesis's lack of a fifth controller port, Mega Bomberman only supports four players instead of five. This is the first game in the series that uses the modern design of White Bomberman. Bomberman '94 also introduces Louies to the series. Also, Bomberman '94 introduced several recurring characters, such as female and child Bombers (which were multiplayer skins), red/green/blue bombers and secondary villains, possibly originated from combining a "normal" skin with corresponding colors.

== Demos ==
Before the Mega Bomberman project was targeted as a Mega Drive/Genesis port of Bomberman '94, Factor 5 was asked by Hudson to develop what would be the first installment of the Bomberman series for the Mega Drive/Genesis, already codenamed as Mega Bomberman. As a proof of concept, Factor 5 presented a tech demo that allowed eight players to play and fight at the same time by using two Sega Team Player Adaptors. Hudson was impressed with the job, but in the end they reconsidered the task and licensed the Mega Bomberman project to Westone Co., the creators of the Wonder Boy series, to do a direct Mega Drive/Genesis conversion of the PC-Engine game Bomberman '94 to be published by Sega.

The PC Engine version of Bomberman '94 was used as the basis for Tengai Makyō: Deden no Den, a promotional game featuring characters from the RPG franchise Tengai Makyō and only one arena available by default.

== Reception ==
Reception

Review scores
Publication	Score
Electronic Gaming Monthly	6.5/10 (GEN)
Famitsu	6/10, 5/10, 6/10, 8/10 (PC-Engine)
Next Generation	3/5 (GEN)

GamePro gave the Genesis version a positive review, summarizing that "New levels, new enemies, and plenty of other new touches make this game one of the best bombers ever." They particularly approved of the new levels and the animal powerups. Electronic Gaming Monthly's reviewers were divided; while Ed Semrad and Sushi-X echoed GamePro in saying that the new levels and animal powerups made it a strong new installment of Bomberman, Danyon Carpenter and Al Manuel both felt that it was not different enough from the Super NES version to be worth getting. A reviewer for Next Generation, in contrast, argued that the game was too different from the Super NES version, and that the new powerups and animals took away "the beautiful simplicity of the original". He nonetheless recommended it to "any Genesis owner with three friends and a multitap".

Retro Gamer placed the game on their "Top Ten PC Engine Games" list. Complex ranked the game number 91 on their "The 100 Best Sega Genesis Games." Time Extension placed the game on their Best PC Engine / TurboGrafx-16 Games list.
