= Super Bomberman =

1993 video game

- European SNES cover art
- Developer: Produce! (Note: Ported to J2ME by Hudson Soft)
- Publishers: JP/NA: Hudson Soft; EU: Sony Electronic Publishing; Living Mobile GmbH (J2ME)
- Director: Mikio Ueyama
- Producers: Eiji Aoyama; Masaki Kobayashi
- Designer: Kyon Kyon
- Programmer: Makoto Sakai
- Artist: Takayuki Hirai
- Composers: Jun Chikuma; Tomoyuki Hamada
- Series: Bomberman
- Platforms: Super NES, J2ME
- Release: SNES: JP: April 28, 1993; NA: September 1993; EU: November 20, 1993; J2ME: EU: November 13, 2004
- Genres: Action, maze, party
- Modes: Single-player, multiplayer

Super Bomberman (Note: Japanese: スーパーボンバーマン, Hepburn: Sūpā Bonbāman) is a 1993 action maze video game developed by Produce! and published by Hudson Soft for the Super Nintendo Entertainment System. Part of the Bomberman series, it is the first game in the series to retain the Bomberman title in Europe, instead of being renamed to Dynablaster or Eric and the Floaters.

Super Bomberman spawned the Super Bomberman sub-series, of which seven more entries have been released: Super Bomberman 2 (1994), Super Bomberman 3 (1995), Super Bomberman 4 (1996), Super Bomberman 5 (1997), Super Bomberman R (2017), Super Bomberman R Online (2017), and Super Bomberman R 2 (2023). The game was re-released in 2026 as part of the Super Bomberman Collection compilation.

== Gameplay ==

Top: Story mode gameplay.
Bottom: Multiplayer battle mode.
(SNES version shown)

The game takes place on a single non-scrolling screen. The screen shows the top-down view of a grid of 143 (13 x 11) squares. The grid restricts the movement of characters so they can only move horizontally or vertically around the screen. Pressing a button will make Bomberman drop a bomb at his feet. This bomb will pulse for a few seconds (giving the player time to run away) and then explode, shooting flames horizontally and vertically. The game revolves around the idea of using these bomb blasts to destroy walls and enemies. If a bomb explodes and the flame hits another bomb it will cause this second bomb to detonate early. This can cause large chain reactions. If the flame from any bomb hits any character it will injure or kill them (unless they are currently invincible).

Most levels start with the grid being partially filled with destructible soft walls. If a bomb blast hits one of these soft walls, then it disintegrates, allowing characters to pass through the now empty space. Once a bomb is laid, it is usually impossible to walk past until it has detonated. This leads to the tactic of trapping enemies with bombs and forcing them into bomb blasts but can also result in the player's defeat. Special items can be picked up by walking over icons on the screen. These items are normally revealed when destroying walls or killing enemies. There are many different items which give the player different abilities; these change a player's tactics and the way the game is played.

=== Normal Game ===
Normal Game consists of six themed worlds, each with eight stages. The last stage of each world is a boss fight.

The player progresses through the game by clearing all the enemies from the current stage and then exiting via a door that is hidden under one of the destructible walls.

World 5 is different from the others, however. All stages take place in an arena, with no destructible walls or exit doors. The player faces a series of battles against one robot Bombermen at a time, and progresses by defeating them. The last stage is a duel against fake Bomberman.

Normal Game can be played by one or two players. In two-player mode, the aim is to work cooperatively to defeat the enemies, although friendly fire is possible.

The game utilized a password system to save progress. Each stage provided a four-digit password that would allow the player to return to that stage by entering it on the Options screen.

=== Battle Mode ===
Battle Mode is played by one to four players, either human or computer controlled. Because the standard SNES control deck only has two controller ports, in order to play with more than two human players, a multitap device is required.

The battle takes place on one of twelve themed stages. The aim is to blow up the other players while staying alive. All bomb blasts are instantly fatal in Battle Mode. The last remaining player wins the round and receives a gold trophy. The overall winner is the first person to win a set number of gold trophies (i.e. the first person to win a certain number of rounds). The number of trophies needed is configurable when starting the game and ranges from 1 to 5.

Each round has a time limit of two minutes. If nobody has won after two minutes then the round is declared a draw and no trophies are given. It is also possible for a draw to occur if all remaining players are blown up at the same time.

After a minute and a half the game displays a message to "Hurry Up!" and then starts dropping indestructible walls around the edge of the play field (starting bottom left and travelling clockwise), effectively reducing the area players can move around in. If a character is hit by a falling wall, they die.

Battle Mode can be extremely fast-paced and hectic, reflected in the fast-paced music score that accompanies it. The Speed Round, which is Stage 12, is considered to be the most competitive as it requires a large amount of skill to control the fast-paced players and bomb detonation.

Special items appear during the gameplay for ammo supply as players destroy walls, enemies, or opponents. During a Normal Game, the effects of all items (except firepower, number of bombs, and speed) will be lost when the player loses a life. During a Battle Game, the effects of all the items last for one battle only.

== Plot ==
The game's story takes place in Diamond City. There, Carat Diamond and Dr. Mook are holding a Robot Tournament. They create a fake Bomberman to enter Peace Town, White Bomberman's hometown, and kidnap him. Their goal is to steal his advanced combat capabilities.

Black Bomberman is aware of their plan and goes alone to face the fake Bomberman, but he fails and his castle is taken. Black Bomberman manages to escape and warns White Bomberman of the situation.

Later on, Peace Town is invaded by hordes of robots created by the enemy duo. The two Bombermen join forces to stop them.

At the end, White and Black Bomberman face against Carat Diamond and Dr. Mook on Diamond Tower. They defeat the duo, that surrenders and gets sent to prison.

== Development ==
Super Bomberman was originally bundled with a multitap device to allow more than two players to play simultaneously. The Super Multitap was long and grey with four controller ports in a row on one side. It plugged into either of the controller ports on the SNES deck. This meant a total of five controllers could be plugged in with the fifth controller plugged into the second port on the SNES.

Although Super Bomberman, as well as Super Bomberman 2, only allowed the use of the first four controllers to play the game, other Super Bomberman games (3 to 5) allowed the use of three to five controllers.

Hudson Soft later released a second multitap (the Super Multitap 2) on its own for people that had purchased Super Bomberman unbundled, or one of the other multitap-enabled games. This second version was designed in the shape of a Bomberman's head and had the two controller ports on the front and one on each side. It was also designed to be used with future games. Eventually there were 54 Super NES games that utilised the multitap. However, they were predominantly sports games.

== Reception ==
Reception

Review scores
Publication	Score
Famitsu	30/40
GamesMaster	93%
Hyper	92%
Official Nintendo Magazine	93/100
Super Play	92%
Total!	(UK) 93% (DE) 2
Electronic Games	92%
Hippon Super!	6/10
Nintendo Game Zone	87/100
SNES Force	78/100
Super Action	93%
Super Control	92%
Dengeki Super Famicom	9/10, 8/10, 7/10, 8/10
Super Gamer	94%
Super Pro	87/100
VideoGames	9/10

Award
Publication	Award
GamePro (1993)	Strategy/Puzzle Game of the Year

According to Famitsu, Super Bomberman sold 117,322 copies in its first week on the market and 497,000 copies during its lifetime in Japan. The game received a 24.02/30 score in a 1993 readers' poll conducted by Super Famicom Magazine, ranking among Super Famicom titles at the number 20 spot. It also received acclaim from critics. Electronic Gaming Monthly's four editors named it "Game of the Month" and it received a "Platinum Editor's Choice", stating that its addictiveness is on par with that of Tetris. They highlighted its multiplayer, but commented that the game is fun even in single-player mode.

Game Informer ranked it the 90th best game ever made in 2001. They claimed that its multi-player mode resulted in missed deadlines at video game magazines and development studios due to its quality. In 2011, IGN rated the game 49th on their "Top 100 SNES Games of All Time". In 2018, Complex rated Super Bomberman 37th on their The Best Super Nintendo Games of All Time and they opined the game is "probably best four-player game for the SNES."

== See also ==
- List of Bomberman video games
