= Bomberman '93 =

1992 video game

- North American cover art
- Developer: Hudson Soft
- Publisher: Hudson Soft
- Director: Shigeki Fujiwara
- Designer: Tsukasa Kuwahara
- Programmer: Tetsuya Wakabayashi
- Artists: Fumie Takaoka; Yoshihiro Iwata; Misuzu Kobayashi
- Composer: Jun Chikuma
- Series: Bomberman
- Platforms: PC Engine/TurboGrafx 16, PC
- Release: PC Engine/TurboGrafx-16: JP: December 11, 1992; NA: March 1993; PC: JP: December 19, 2002; NA: March 24, 2003
- Genres: Puzzle, maze
- Modes: Single-player, multiplayer

Bomberman '93 (ボンバーマン'93, Bonbāman kyūjūsan) is a maze video game in the Bomberman series released by Hudson Soft for the PC Engine on December 11, 1992 in Japan, with Western TurboGrafx-16 releases following in 1993. The game was also re-released for PCs in 2002 alongside the TurboGrafx-16 version of Bomberman and Bomberman World as part of a compilation disc titled Bomberman Collection. The game was re-released for the Virtual Console, with full multiplayer capability intact, for Wii on November 21, 2006 in North America, December 8, 2006 in Europe, and July 6, 2007 in Australia. The game was re-released for the Wii U on December 28, 2016 in Japan, November 30, 2017 in North America and December 14, 2017 in Europe. Bomberman '93 later spawned a sequel titled Bomberman '94.

== Story ==
Black Bomberman has stolen seven chips from the pan-galactic bureau's mother computer and scattered them across several planets of the Magellan solar system. It is up to the ace detective Bomber Cop, aka White Bomberman, to recover them.

== Gameplay ==
The gameplay consists of the same basic structure as the previous games in the series. The player controls Bomberman by moving him around block filled mazes and laying down bombs. The bombs erupt into a cross-shaped explosion several seconds after being set. The explosion can destroy any blocks or enemies in its path, as well as Bomberman himself. If the explosion touches another bomb, the second bomb will instantly explode as well. This basic formula is used in both the single player and multi-player modes.

=== Single-player ===
The single player game consists of seven themed worlds, each containing eight stages. Each stage consists of a block filled maze, with enemies scattered throughout it. Using bombs, the player must destroy the blocks in their path and defeat the enemies. Once all of the enemies are defeated, the portal to the next stage opens. Powerups are hidden beneath certain blocks, which can give the player increased bombs and firepower, as well as useful abilities like being able to kick bombs. The eighth stage of each world is a boss battle. The game differs from previous games in the series in that the stages are more interactive, with devices such as conveyor belts and teleporters appearing in certain areas. This mode utilizes a password system or there is limited save memory if the player in question wants to save.

Battle Mode

=== Multiplayer ===
The multiplayer mode allows up to five players to compete against one another in a timed deathmatch. Each player attempts to collect power-ups in order to destroy the competing players while staying alive.

The last Bomberman alive wins the round. Unlike the single player game, some blocks contain skulls instead of power-ups. These are detrimental if picked up. There are multiple stages to choose from in this mode, with each having its own theme and gimmick.

The Virtual Console version of the game supports only four players using Wii Remotes. The five-player mode can be activated by holding the R button on an attached GameCube controller while starting the game from the Wii menu.

== Development and release ==
The soundtrack was handled by Bomberman series composer Jun Chikuma. As with many Bomberman games she worked on, Chikuma incorporated the melody originated from Bomberman (1985) on the Nintendo Entertainment System (NES). One particular track was remixed as a chill-out arrangement of the music previously used for Battle Mode. Compared to the NES, the TurboGrafx-16's audio hardware had two extra channels for a total of six, which made it possible to produce many types of music. Despite this, Chikuma personally preferred working with the NES due to having a stronger tone quality.

== Reception ==
Reception

Review score
Publication	Score
IGN	85/100 (VC)

Bomberman '93 was awarded Best TurboGrafx-16 Game of 1993 by Electronic Gaming Monthly. In 2009, IGN placed the game on their top 16 TurboGrafx-16 games list and said that the game is "one of Hudson's best editions of the game (next to Saturn Bomberman)". In 2020, Paste ranked the game fifth on their "The 16 Best TurboGrafx-16 Games" list.
