= Super Bomberman 3 =

1995 video game

- European cover art
- Developer: Hudson Soft
- Publishers: JP: Hudson Soft; EU: Virgin Interactive Entertainment
- Director: Shigeki Fujiwara
- Designer: Tatsumitsu Watanabe
- Programmers: Hikaru Aoyama; Ryuichi Masuda; Satoshi Mikami
- Artists: Naoto Yoshimi; Shoji Mizuno
- Composers: Jun Chikuma; Keita Hoshi
- Series: Bomberman
- Platform: Super Nintendo Entertainment System
- Release: JP: 28 April 1995; EU: October 1995
- Genres: Action, maze, party
- Modes: Single-player, multiplayer

Super Bomberman 3 (Note: Japanese: スーパーボンバーマン3, Hepburn: Sūpā Bonbāman Surī) is a game released for the Super Nintendo Entertainment System in 1995. It is the third installment in the Super Bomberman series, and the third Bomberman game to be released for the system. Up to five players can play at the same time. The game was released in Japan and the PAL region, but not in North America due to the closure of Hudson Soft USA.

== Gameplay ==
Story mode gameplay.

Multiplayer battle mode.

The player controls Bomberman, placing bombs to destroy enemies and certain blocks. The protagonist can acquire power-ups, such an increased bomb limit, increased speed and explosions with larger range.

The Story Mode consists of five planets. Each of them has multiple stages, in which the player collects chips stored in control capsules. Once all chips from a planet are acquired, Bomberman faces the respective boss. Upon defeating said enemy, the game progresses to the following planet. Bomberman's final goal is restoring the power of the central security computer, thus bringing the solar system back to normal.

Super Bomberman 3 was the first Super Bomberman game that allowed for up to five players in Battle Mode, as the first two installments only allowed up to four. The multiplayer mode features several characters, each representing a country of Earth (including one of the villains, Pretty Bomber, as France, which marks her first appearance as a non-enemy character).

The overall animation graphics changed with the third installment; unlike Super Bomberman and Super Bomberman 2, the third installment's graphics were simplified, which look similar to the graphics of the Bomberman games for the PC Engine, and most of the music in the game are remixed versions of previous older Bomberman soundtracks.

== Plot ==
One night, the villain Bagular approaches a junkyard where the bodies of the Five Dastardly Bombers are. He pulls them into his UFO, sets them on tables and begins working on reviving them. Upon hearing this, White Bomber and Black Bomber set out to stop the group of enemies, and ultimately defeat Bagular himself.

== Development and release ==
Super Bomberman 3 was developed by a different team than the previous games'; only two staff members were shared between the development teams for Super Bomberman 3 and Bomberman '94. The game was released in 1995; it would not be released in North America due to the shutdown of Hudson Soft in North America.

The game was re-released for PlayStation 5, Xbox Series X/S, Nintendo Switch 2, Nintendo Switch, and PC on February 5, 2026, as part of the Super Bomberman Collection compilation.

== Reception ==
Reception

Review scores
Publication	Score
Famitsu	8/10, 7/10, 6/10, 7/10
GamesMaster	93%
Consoles +	85%
Fun Generation	8/10
Joypad	84% 91%
Gameplanet	3.5/5
MAN!AC	86%
Mega Fun	84%
Nintendo Magazine System	91/100
Play Time	85/100
Player One	90%
Superjuegos	92/100
Total!	2+ (B+)
Ultra Player	5/6
Video Games	82%

The game sold over 612,000 copies in Japan. In November 1997, in its 60th monthly issue, Nintendo Acción listed it as the 22nd best game they had ever reviewed.
