= Super Bomberman 2 =

1994 video game

- North American box art
- Developer: Produce!
- Publishers: JP/NA: Hudson Soft; EU: Virgin Interactive Entertainment
- Producer: Raoh Shimada
- Designer: Takayuki Hirai
- Programmers: B. Hanawa; Teturou Kiyomoto; Toshiyuki Suzuki
- Artists: Jun Kusaka; Junya Numakunai
- Composer: Yasuhiko Fukuda
- Series: Bomberman
- Platform: Super Nintendo Entertainment System
- Release: JP: April 28, 1994; NA: September 1994; EU: November 1994
- Genres: Action, maze, party
- Modes: Single-player, multiplayer

Super Bomberman 2 (Note: Japanese: スーパーボンバーマン2, Hepburn: Sūpā Bonbāman Tsū) is a 1994 action maze video game developed by Produce! and published by Hudson Soft for the Super Nintendo Entertainment System. It is the second installment of the Super Bomberman series, part of the larger Bomberman franchise, and the only installment without a two-player story mode. The game was re-released in 2026 as part of the Super Bomberman Collection compilation.

== Gameplay ==

Top: Story mode gameplay.
Bottom: Multiplayer battle mode.

=== Story mode ===
The story mode consists of walking through maze-like areas filled with blocks, monsters, and switches with a goal of opening the gate leading to the next area. To accomplish this, the player lays bombs to destroy all the monsters and flip all the switches. Destroying blocks in the maze will uncover useful power-ups to increase their bomb count, firepower and speed, and grant them special abilities such as remote control bombs, throwing bombs, and taking an extra hit.

There are five worlds total, and at the end of each world is a boss. Each boss is first battled on foot before retreating into a giant machine. After the boss is defeated, the player will move on to the next world.

=== Multiplayer ===
In Battle Mode, two players (four with a multitap) can face each other in one of ten arenas. Matches can be customized as battle royal matches or team matches. A special option called G-Bomber was added, making the winner of each match golden and allowing them to begin the next match with a random power-up.

== Story ==
Five evil cyborgs called the Five Dastardly Bombers are bent on taking over the universe. On Earth, they capture the original Bomberman, and he is placed in a prison cell in their space station. He awakens in the dungeon of Magnet Bomber and must fight his way to a final showdown with Magnet Bomber himself. In the following four worlds, Bomberman will challenge Golem Bomber, Pretty Bomber, Brain Bomber, and their leader, Plasma Bomber, in an effort to free the Earth and himself from these alien invaders.

== Release ==
The game was re-released on February 5, 2026, for PlayStation 5, Xbox Series X/S, Nintendo Switch, Nintendo Switch 2, and Steam as part of the Super Bomberman Collection compilation.

== Reception ==
Reception

Review scores
Publication	Score
Computer and Video Games	90/100
Famitsu	6/10, 7/10, 6/10, 7/10
Game Informer	7.75/10
Game Players	86%
GameFan	38/50, 36/50, 39/50
GamesMaster	88%
Next Generation	5/5
Official Nintendo Magazine	92/100
Super Play	91%
Total!	(UK) 94/100 (DE) 2
VideoGames & Computer Entertainment	6/10
Digital Press	10/10
Games World	89/100
Super Gamer	83/100

According to Famitsu, Super Bomberman 2 sold 153,587 copies in its first week on the market and 730,000 copies during its lifetime in Japan. The Japanese publication Micom BASIC Magazine ranked the game second in popularity in its August 1994 issue, and it received a 23.7/30 score in a readers' poll conducted by Super Famicom Magazine. It also garnered generally favorable reception from critics.

GamePro's Lawrence Neves gave the game a positive review, praising the strategic gameplay, cute graphics, and music, though he remarked that the single-player mode is considerably less engaging than the multiplayer. Next Generation reviewed the game, rating it five stars out of five, and stated that "This is truly God's perfect party game."

=== Legacy ===
Next Generation's 1996 lexicon of video game terms included the joke entries "Bomb-o'clock" and "Bombaholic", in which they referred to Super Bomberman 2 as "the videogame of choice for game developers everywhere". Later that year they named it the 3rd best game of all time, praising its controls, graphics, gameplay and multiplayer mode, and stating that it "epitomizes the Japanese art of taking a ludicrously simple concept, and then executing that concept faultlessly".

In 1999, Next Generation listed Super Bomberman 2 as number 30 on their list of the "Top 50 Games of All Time", commenting that it "remains a timeless reminder of the ingenuity and purity of gameplay that characterized Nintendo's world-beating console". IGN ranked the game 89th on their list of the "Top 100 SNES Games of All Time".

In 1995, Total! ranked it third on their "Top 100 SNES Games". In 1996, GamesMaster ranked it sixth in "The GamesMaster SNES Top 10". In the same issue, they also ranked the game 10th in "Top 100 Games of All Time", at the time calling it "the best multi-player game in the world".
