= Bomberman (1983 video game) =

- FM-7 box art
- Developer: Hudson Soft
- Publishers: JP: Hudson Soft; EU: Sinclair Research, Kuma
- Programmers: Toshiyuki Sasagawa; Y. Tanaka
- Series: Bomberman
- Platform: List: PC-6001, PC-8001mkII, PC-8801, MSX, FM-7, Hitachi Mark 5, MZ-700, MZ-2000, X1, ZX Spectrum
- Release: July 1983: FM-7, PC-8001, X1; JP: July 1983 PC-6001, MZ-700, MZ-2000, Hitachi Mark 5; JP: 1983/1984 MSX; JP: 1983/1984; EU: 1985 ZX Spectrum; EU: April 1984
- Genre: Maze
- Mode: Single-player

Bomberman (Note: Japanese: 爆弾男, Hepburn: Bakudan Otoko) is a 1983 maze video game developed and published by Hudson Soft. The first game in the Bomberman franchise, it was originally released for the Japanese computers, including the FM-7, Hitachi Mark 5, MSX, MZ-700, MZ-2000, PC-6001, PC-8001mkII, PC-8801, and X1. It was later published in Europe as Eric and the Floaters for the MSX and ZX Spectrum.

The player controls a man equipped with bombs in maze-like levels. The objective is to defeat all balloon enemies with his bombs, which are able to attack the balloons and destroy walls. Various actions reward the player with points, such as discovering and collecting treasures found in the walls.

Bomberman was originally written in 1980 as a tech demo for Hudson's compiler before the company gave it a small-scale publication. Bomberman received divisive reviews, with critics conflicted over its gameplay, presentation, and controls. A direct sequel, 3-D Bomberman, was produced and released in 1984. A revised port for the Nintendo Entertainment System, titled Bomberman, was released in 1985 to better reception.

== Gameplay ==
Gameplay of the MSX version; the player character's bomb eliminates a balloon enemy.

Bomberman is a maze video game where the player controls a man with a bowler hat. In the European version, the protagonist is known as Eric the archaelogoist, who explores underground dungeon for treasure hunt. Each level starts with the player character in a randomly generated maze consisting of walls. The player character is controlled with cursor keys or joystick. On the keyboard, the movement is assigned to the W, D, X, and A keys. By pressing the space bar, the player installs a timed bomb, which will explode after approximately three seconds. The bombs can destroy weaker parts of walls nearby. The player character will perish if they are caught in the bomb explosion. The player can plant up to a maximum of five bombs. A bomb explosion can set off the other bombs instantly, inducing a chain reaction. Unlike future Bomberman games, it is also possible to install a bomb between two tiles on the level grid and destruct only half of a wall.

In every level, there are hostile balloons, known as the Floaters in the European version, that move around and will kill the player character on contact, costing a life. The balloons are normally purple, but whenever they turn red, they become aggressive and give chase to the player character. The player can defeat the balloons by placing bombs and letting their explosion hit them. When all balloons are killed, the player is transported to the next level. In the first level, there is only one balloon, but the number of enemies increase as the game proceeds. There are twenty unique levels in total.

The player is awarded with points that add to the overall score depending on their actions. Destructing walls can sometimes make a treasure appear in its place. By collecting it, the player earns between 160 and 1260 points. Bursting a balloon with bombs also nets the player from 10 to 200 points. Defeating the red balloons grants the full 200 points, while they are worth less when they are in their passive state. After eliminating all balloons and completing a level, additional bonus points get accumulated to the total score. The player can also discover an exit hidden under a wall. In most versions of the game, entering the exit does not advance the player to the next level, but merely resets the current level.

== Development and release ==
Bomberman was developed by Hudson Soft, a Japanese company founded in 1973 by brothers Yuji and Hiroshi Kudo. Hudson was one of the first corporations in the world to publish video game software, initially for computers like Sharp Corporation's MZ-80. Bomberman was programmed by Hudson employees, Toshiyuki Sasagawa and Y. Tanaka. It was written in 1980 with the BASIC programming language, and served as a demonstration for Hudson Soft's compiler. The inspiration behind the game is not known, but Retro Gamer speculated it was influenced by arcade maze games such as Namco's Pac-Man and Universal Entertainment's Mr. Do!.

Hudson later gave it a small-scale release for Japanese computers. It was published for PC-6001, PC-8001mkII, PC-8001. FM-7, Sharp X1, MZ-700, MZ-2000, MSX, and Hitachi Mark 5 between 1983 and 1984. The X1, PC-8001mkII, and FM-7 versions were released in July 1983. The Japanese version was known as Bakudan Otoko, and stylized as Bomber Man.

Bomberman received an European release for ZX Spectrum and MSX under the title Eric and the Floaters. At that time, Hudson Soft had created and exported video game software for the ZX Spectrum, Commodore 64, and MSX. The ZX Spectrum version was among a batch of the five software licensed by Sinclair Research for publication, including Stop the Express, Driller Tanks, Zipper Flipper, and Bubble Buster. Zipper Flipper was produced by RED Sunshine, while the other four were created by Hudson. The ZX Spectrum version was published in April 1984 alongside Stop the Express and Driller Tanks. The MSX version was published by Kuma in 1985. The box art of the United Kingdom version depicted the main character as an Indiana Jones-style adventurer.

There are numerous differences between various versions of Bomberman in terms of visuals and gameplay. In the MSX and ZX Spectrum versions, there are special levels subtitled "Bomb Auto Setting", where the player character will automatically place a bomb whenever he takes a step. In addition, the balloons do not have faces in the ZX Spectrum version of Eric and the Floaters. The MZ-700 and MZ-2000 versions have every character represented by an arrangement of squares. The X1 version has exclusive animations for the intro and level transition. The Hitachi Mark 5 version modifies the exit's function, now sending the player to the next level instead of resetting the progress.

== Reception ==
Reviwers criticized the ZX Spectrum version's joystick support was limited to the ZX Interface 2 (pictured).

In Europe, Eric and the Floaters was released to mixed reviews. Critics were divided over its bombing gameplay. Some critics found it "addictive"; MSX User said it was likely to appeal to the younger games player. Others were critical toward it. Sinclair Programs referred to it as a "monster-in-the-maze-type game" that felt dated. Sinclair Answers stated its limited scenario made the reviewer bored. Computer and Video Games said it is as good as "mediocre maze games" on the ZX Spectrum.

The controls received particular criticism. Crash and Popular Computing Weekly condemned that the ZX Spectrum verison only supported Sinclair Research's ZX Interface 2 for joystick control, calling it "selfish". One reviewer from Crash suspected this was because Sinclair wanted to sell its own interface, and said the limitation turned them off even though the game proved to be "almost addictive". Another reviewer said the keyboard controls were "unresponsive". Popular Computing Weekly found the game difficult to play because the controls for keyboard were mapped awkwardly and there was no way to redefine them. Computer and Video Games likewise reacted unfavorably toward the keyboard controls and preferred playing with a joystick. It also criticized that characters move only by a whole square at a time.

Reviews were mixed over the graphics and the sound. TV Gamer was positive for both; it called the graphics "simple but good", and highlighted the explosion noises and the player character's walking sound. One Crash reviewer said the graphics were "good", while another remarked they are large but jerky, and the use of color is drab. Computer and Video Games criticized the graphics, describing it slow, dull, and visually boring. It also noted the lack of background music.

Retrospective reviews were largely negative. Den of Geek remarked the very first Bomberman felt like a "pared-back prototype" of what came after it, criticizing the lack of music and bland character designs. It also noted that both the player character and the balloons can walk over bombs freely, while later Bomberman games allow trapping opponents with bombs. Because of the difference, Den of Geek found that the 1983 Bomberman became a game of timing rather than strategy. Hardcore Gaming 101 said it was outclassed by every Bomberman installment afterwards. However, both Den of Geek and Hardcore Gaming 101 agreed it still contained several key elements of the future Bomberman games.

== Legacy ==
Hudson Soft released a sequel titled 3-D Bomberman in 1984 for the MSX, FM-7, X1, and PC-6001. It retains the gameplay of the 1983 video game and frames it in a first-person perspective. It is unknown how well 3-D Bomberman performed commercially, but it is retrospectively assumed 3-D Bomberman was a disappointment for Hudson because it did not receive as many ports as the 1983 video game, and the next game reverted back to the top down perspective.

In 1985, an enhanced port of the 1983 video game, simply titled Bomberman, was published for the Family Computer (Famicom) home console, also known as the Nintendo Entertainment System. It was released in a wake of Hudson Soft entering the console video game market and porting its computer games to the platform. The console version of Bomberman was programmed by Hudson director Shinichi Nakamoto, and replaced the human protagonist with the robot character from Hudson's Famicom port of Lode Runner. Adopting new game mechanics like power-ups, the Famicom port was a success. Nakamoto said in 1995, "I personally believe that the Famicom version of Bomberman is the one and only version of the game."

== See also ==
- List of Bomberman video games
- Last man standing (video games)
