= List of Super Game Boy games =

The following is an alphabetical list of Game Boy and Game Boy Color games that use enhancements, color palettes, or other features provided by the Super Game Boy. For additional lists, please refer to the "Lists of video games" section.

In total, there are 524 games available for the Super Game Boy.

== List ==
Note: The list of features and regions are incomplete. You can help if know much about them. However, you may have to link citations for evidence.

List of Game Boy games with Super Game Boy enhancements
Title	GBC game	Multiple borders	Palettes		Custom audio	Multiplayer support		Regions			Notes
Title	GBC game	Multiple borders	Special Default	Changes disabled	Custom audio	Two Players	Multitap	JP	NA	EU	Notes
Adventures of Lolo Lolo no Daibouken ^{JP}	No	No						No	No	Yes	
Akazukin Chacha	No	No						Yes	No	No	
Alfred Chicken	No	No						Yes	No	No	
Alleyway	No	No	Yes					Yes	Yes	Yes	
Animal Breeder	No	Yes						Yes	No	No	
Animal Breeder 2	No	Yes						Yes	No	No	
Animal Breeder 3	Yes	Yes						Yes	No	No	
Animaniacs	No	No		Yes	Yes			No	Yes	Yes	
Another Bible	No	Yes						Yes	No	No	
Aoki Densetsu Shoot!	No	No						Yes	No	No	
Aqualife	Yes	No						Yes	No	No	
Arcade Classic No. 1: Asteroids / Missile Command	No	Yes						No	Yes	Yes	
Arcade Classic No. 2: Centipede / Millipede	No	Yes						No	Yes	Yes	
Arcade Classic No. 3: Galaga / Galaxian Galaga & Galaxian ^{JP}	No	Yes						Yes	Yes	Yes	
Arcade Classic No. 4: Defender / Joust	No	Yes						No	Yes	Yes	
Arcade Classics: Super Breakout / Battlezone	No	Yes						No	Yes	Yes	
Arle no Bouken: Mahou no Jewel	Yes	No						Yes	No	No	
Asterix & Obelix	No	No						No	No	Yes	
Azure Dreams Other Life: Azure Dreams GB ^{JP}	Yes	No						Yes	Yes	Yes	
B-Daman Bakugaiden: Victory e no Michi	Yes	No						Yes	No	No	
Bakenou TV '94	No	Yes						Yes	No	No	
Bakuchou Retrieve Master	No	No		Yes				Yes	No	No	
Bakuchou Retsuden Shou: Hyper Fishing	No	No						Yes	No	No	
Balloon Fight GB	Yes	Yes						Yes	No	No	Released outside Japan as Balloon Kid for the original GB, without enhancements.
Barcode Taisen Bardigun	Yes	No						Yes	No	No	
Baseball	No	No	Yes					Yes	Yes	No	
Battle Arena Toshinden	No	No				Yes		Yes	Yes	Yes	
Battle Crusher	No	No				Yes		Yes	No	No	
Beatmania GB	Yes	Yes		Yes				Yes	No	No	
Beatmania GB 2: Gotcha Mix	Yes	Yes		Yes				Yes	No	No	
Beethoven	No	No						No	No	Yes	No special border.
Bikkuriman 2000: Charging Card GB	Yes	No						Yes	No	No	
Blaster Master: Enemy Below	Yes	No						No	Yes	Yes	
Block Kuzushi GB	No	No						Yes	No	No	
Blupi's Adventures ^{(aftermarket)}	Yes	No	Yes					No	No	Yes	
Bomberman Collection	No	Yes			Yes	Yes	Yes	Yes	No	No	Multiplayer only for Bomberman GB and Bomberman GB2.
Bomberman GB	No	No			Yes	Yes	Yes	Yes	No	No	Released as Wario Blast: Featuring Bomberman! in North America and Europe.
Bomberman GB 2	No	Yes			Yes	Yes	Yes	Yes	No	No	Released as Bomberman GB in North America and Europe.
Bomberman GB 3	No	Yes			Yes	Yes		Yes	No	No	
Bomberman Quest	Yes	Yes		Yes				Yes	Yes	Yes	
Bonk's Revenge GB Genjin 2 ^{JP}	No	No						Yes	Yes	Yes	Has a special border featuring the Chikkuns.
Brain Drain	No	No						Yes	Yes	Yes	
Bugs Bunny Collection	No	Yes						Yes	No	No	
Burger Burger Pocket	Yes	No						Yes	No	No	
Captain Tsubasa J: Zenkoku Seiha e no Chousen	No	Yes						Yes	No	No	
Castlevania Legends Akumajou Dracula: Shikkokutaru Zensoukyoku ^{JP}	No	No						Yes	Yes	Yes	
Centipede	No	No						No	Yes	Yes	Majesco re-release version, box and cart show SGB logo but no enhancements.
Chalvo 55	No	Yes						Yes	No	No	
Chase H.Q.: Secret Police	Yes	No						Yes	Yes	Yes	
Chibi Makuro-chan: Makuro Deluxe Gekijou	No	No						Yes	No	No	
Choro Q: Hyper Customable GB	Yes	Yes						Yes	No	No	
Chou Mashin Eiyuuden Wataru: Mazekko Monster	No	No						Yes	No	No	
Chou Mashin Eiyuuden Wataru: Mazekko Monster 2	No	Yes						Yes	No	No	
Chousoku Spinner	No	No						Yes	No	No	
Classic Bubble Bobble	Yes	No						Yes	Yes	Yes	Similar to the original GB Bubble Bobble, which has no enhancements, but a bit different.
Collection Pocket	No	No						Yes	No	No	
Columns GB: Tezuka Osamu Characters	Yes	No						Yes	No	No	
Conker's Pocket Tales	Yes	No		Yes				No	Yes	Yes	
Contra: The Alien Wars Contra Spirits ^{JP} Probotector 2 ^{EU}	No	No			Yes			Yes	Yes	Yes	No special border.
Crayon Shin-Chan: Ora no Gokigen Collection	No	No						Yes	No	No	
Crayon Shin-Chan 4: Ora no Itazura Daihenshin	No	Yes						Yes	No	No	
Daffy Duck: The Marvin Missions	No	Yes						Yes	Yes	Yes	Originally released without enhancements.
Dai-2-Ji Super Robot Taisen G	No	No						Yes	No	No	
Daikaijuu Monogatari: The Miracle of the Zone	No	No						Yes	No	No	
Daikaijuu Monogatari: The Miracle of the Zone II	Yes	No						Yes	No	No	
Daiku no Gensan: Kachikachi no Tonkachi ga Kachi	Yes	No						Yes	No	No	
Dear Daniel no Sweet Adventure: Kitty-chan o Sagashite	Yes	No						Yes	No	No	
Desert Strike	No	No						No	Yes	Yes	An extra screen appears as the Super Game Boy border disappears, showing a 16-bit Ocean logo.
Dino Breeder	No	No						Yes	No	No	
Dino Breeder 2	No	No						Yes	No	No	
Dino Breeder 3: Gaia Fukkatsu	Yes	No						Yes	No	No	
Dino Breeder 4	Yes	No						Yes	No	No	
Disney's A Bug's Life	Yes	No			Yes			No	Yes	Yes	
Disney's Aladdin	No	No						No	Yes	Yes	
Disney's Beauty and the Beast: A Board Game Adventure	Yes	No						No	Yes	Yes	
Disney's Hercules	No	No			Yes			No	Yes	Yes	
Disney's The Hunchback of Notre Dame - Topsy Turvy Games	No	No			Yes			No	Yes	Yes	
Disney's Mulan	No	No			Yes			No	Yes	Yes	
Disney's Pocahontas	No	No		Yes	Yes			No	Yes	Yes	Controller changes are disabled.
Disney's Toy Story	No	No			Yes			No	Yes	Yes	
Disney's Toy Story 2	Yes	No						No	Yes	Yes	
Donkey Kong	No	No	Yes		Yes		No	Yes	Yes	Yes	Enhanced music can only be heard in the game's ending credits.
Donkey Kong Land	No	No						Yes	Yes	Yes	
Donkey Kong Land 2	No	No		Yes				Yes	Yes	Yes	
Donkey Kong Land III Donkey Kong GB: Dinky Kong & Dixie Kong ^{JP}	No	No		Yes			No	No	Yes	Yes	Japanese version released only for GBC without enhancements.
Doraemon no Game Boy de Asobouyo DX 10	No	No						Yes	No	No	
Doraemon Kart	No	No						Yes	No	No	
Doraemon Kart 2	Yes	No						Yes	No	No	
Dr. Mario	No	No	Yes					Yes	Yes	Yes	
Dragon Ball Z: Goku Gekitōden	No	Yes				Yes		Yes	No	No	
Dragon Ball Z: Goku Hishōden	No	Yes			Yes	Yes		Yes	No	No	
Dragon Dance Pocket Color Block ^{JP}	Yes	No						Yes	Yes	No	
Dragon Warrior I & II	Yes	Yes		Yes				Yes	Yes	No	
Dragon Warrior Monsters	Yes	Yes		Yes				Yes	Yes	Yes	
Dragon Warrior Monsters 2: Cobi's Journey	Yes	Yes		Yes				Yes	Yes	No	Final SGB-enhanced titles released in North America. (with below)
Dragon Warrior Monsters 2: Tara's Adventure	Yes	Yes		Yes				Yes	Yes	No	Final SGB-enhanced titles released in North America. (with above)
DT: Lords of Genomes	Yes	No						Yes	No	No	
Dungeon Savior	Yes	No						Yes	No	No	
DX Monopoly GB	Yes	No						Yes	No	No	
Elie no Atelier GB	Yes	No						Yes	No	No	
Elite Soccer Soccer ^{EU} World Cup Striker ^{JP}	No	No						No	Yes	Yes	
F-1 Race	No	No	Yes	Yes				Yes	Yes	Yes	
Fairy Kitty no Kaiun Jiten: Yousei no Kuni no Uranai Shugyou	Yes	No						Yes	No	No	
FIFA International Soccer	No	No						No	Yes	Yes	
FIFA Soccer 96	No	No		Yes				No	Yes	Yes	
FIFA Soccer 97	No	No		Yes	Yes			No	Yes	Yes	Controller changes are disabled.
FIFA: Road to World Cup 98	No	No			Yes			No	No	Yes	
FIFA 2000	Yes	No						No	Yes	Yes	
Frisky Tom	No	No						Yes	No	No	
Frogger	No	No						No	Yes	No	Box and cart show SGB logo but no enhancements.
From TV Animation One Piece: Maboroshi no Grand Line Boukenki!	Yes	No						Yes	No	No	Final SGB-enhanced title released worldwide.
From TV Animation One Piece: Yume no Luffy Kaizokudan Tanjou!	Yes	No						Yes	No	No	
From TV Animation Slam Dunk: Gakeppuchi no Kesshou League	No	No						Yes	No	No	
From TV Animation Slam Dunk 2: Zenkoku e no Tip Off	No	Yes						Yes	No	No	
Fushigi no Dungeon: Fuurai no Shiren GB: Tsukikagemura no Kaibutsu	No	No		Yes				Yes	No	No	
Game & Watch Gallery Game Boy Gallery ^{JP} Game Boy Gallery 2 ^{AUS}	No	Yes						Yes	Yes	Yes	
Game & Watch Gallery 2 Game Boy Gallery 2 ^{JP} Game Boy Gallery 3 ^{AUS}	Yes	Yes						Yes	Yes	Yes	Not released for GBC in Japan.
Game & Watch Gallery 3 Game Boy Gallery 3 ^{JP} Game Boy Gallery 4 ^{AUS}	Yes	Yes						Yes	Yes	Yes	
Game Boy Camera Pocket Camera ^{JP}	No	No						Yes	Yes	Yes	
Game Boy Camera: Gold Zelda Edition	No	No						No	Yes	No	
Game Boy Gallery	No	Yes						No	No	Yes	
Game Boy Wars	No	No	Yes					Yes	No	No	
Game Boy Wars 2	Yes	No						Yes	No	No	
Game Boy Wars Turbo / Game Boy Wars Turbo Famitsu version	No	No						Yes	No	No	
Gamera: Daikaijuu Kuuchuu Kessen	No	Yes						Yes	No	No	
Game de Hakken!! Tamagotchi 2	No	Yes						Yes	No	No	
Game de Hakken!! Tamagotchi: Osutchi to Mesutchi	No	Yes						Yes	No	No	
Ganbare Goemon: Mononoke Douchuu Tobisuise Nabebugyou!	Yes	No						Yes	No	No	
Gegege no Kitarou: Youkai Souzoushu Arawaru!	No	No						Yes	No	No	
Genjin Collection	No	Yes						Yes	No	No	
Genjin Kotts	No	No						Yes	No	No	
The Getaway: High Speed II	No	No						No	Yes	No	Box and cart show SGB logo but no SGB enhancements.
God Medicine: Fantasy Sekai no Tanjou	No	No						Yes	No	No	
Golf	No	No	Yes					Yes	Yes	Yes	
Golf Daisuki!	Yes	No						Yes	No	No	
Golf Ou: The King of Golf	Yes	No						Yes	No	No	
Go! Go! Ackman	No	No						Yes	No	No	
Go! Go! Hitchhike	No	Yes						Yes	No	No	
Grand Theft Auto	Yes							No	Yes	Yes	
Grander Musashi RV	No	Yes						Yes	No	No	
The Great Battle Pocket	Yes	Yes						Yes	No	No	
Guruguru Garakutas	Yes	No						Yes	No	No	
Hamster Paradise	Yes	No						Yes	No	No	
Hanasaka Tenshi Tenten-kun no Beat Breaker	Yes	No						Yes	No	No	
Harvest Moon GB Bokujou Monogatari GB ^{JP}	No	No						Yes	Yes	No	
Harvest Moon GBC	Yes	No						No	Yes	Yes	
Harvest Moon 2	Yes	No						No	Yes	Yes	
Hayaosi Quiz: Ouza Ketteisen	No	No						Yes	No	No	
Hello Kitty no Beads Koubou	Yes	No						Yes	No	No	
Hello Kitty no Magical Museum	Yes	No						Yes	No	No	
Hello Kitty no Sweet Adventure: Daniel-kun ni Aitai	Yes	No						Yes	No	No	
Hexcite: The Shapes of Victory Glocal Hexcite ^{JP}	Yes	No		Yes				Yes	Yes	Yes	
Honkaku Shougi: Shougi Ou	Yes	No						Yes	No	No	
Honkaku Yonin Uchi Mahjong: Mahjong Ou	Yes	No						Yes	No	No	
Hon Shougi	No	No						Yes	No	No	
Hugo	No	No						No	No	Yes	A part of Crazy Castle series, also released without enhancements as Mickey Mouse II in Japan, Mickey Mouse in Europe and Bugs Bunny Crazy Castle 2 in North America. As Bugs Bunny Crazy Castle 2, also released in Japan with enhancements, as a part of Bugs Bunny Collection.
Initial D Gaiden	No	No						Yes	No	No	
International Rally Cross Country Racing ^{EU} It's a World Rally ^{JP}	Yes	No						Yes	Yes	Yes	
International Superstar Soccer World Soccer GB ^{JP}	No	No						Yes	Yes	Yes	
International Superstar Soccer 99 World Soccer GB 2 ^{JP}	Yes	No						Yes	Yes	Yes	
International Track & Field Hyper Olympic Series - Track & Field GB ^{JP}	Yes	No						Yes	Yes	Yes	
Iron Man and X-O Manowar in Heavy Metal	No	No						No	Yes	Yes	
Itsudemo Nyanto Wonderful	No	No						Yes	No	No	
J.League Big Wave Soccer Matthias Sammer Soccer ^{EU}	No	No						Yes	No	Yes	
J.League Live '95	No	No						Yes	No	No	
J.League Supporter Soccer	No	No						Yes	No	No	
James Bond 007	No	No						No	Yes	Yes	
Jeopardy! Platinum Edition	No	No						No	Yes	No	
Jeopardy! Teen Tournament	No	No						No	Yes	No	
Jinsei Game	No	Yes				Yes	Yes	Yes	No	No	
Jinsei Game: Tomodachi Takusan Tsukurouyo!	Yes	No						Yes	No	No	
Joryuu Janshi ni Chousen GB: Watashitachi ni Chousen Shitene	Yes	No						Yes	No	No	
Juukou Senki Bullet Battlers	Yes	No						Yes	No	No	
Jungle no Ouja Tar-chan	No	No						Yes	No	No	
Jungle Strike	No	No						No	Yes	Yes	Box and cart show SGB logo but no enhancements.
Kaeru no Tame ni Kane wa Naru	No	No	Yes					Yes	No	No	
Kaijin Zona	Yes	Yes						Yes	No	No	
Kakutou Ryouri Densetsu Bistro Recipe: Gekitou Foodon Battle Hen	Yes	No						Yes	No	No	
Kakutou Ryouri Densetsu Bistro Recipe: Kettou Bistgarm Hen	Yes	No						Yes	No	No	
Kandume Monsters	No	No						Yes	No	No	
Kandume Monsters Parfait	Yes	No						Yes	No	No	
Kanji Boy	Yes	No						Yes	No	No	
Kanji Boy 2	Yes	No						Yes	No	No	
Karamuchou no Daijiken	No	No						Yes	No	No	
Karamuchou wa Oosawagi!: Okawari!	Yes	No						Yes	No	No	
Karamuchou wa Oosawagi!: Porinkiis to Okashina Nakamatachi	Yes	No						Yes	No	No	
Kaseki Sousei Reborn	No	No						Yes	No	No	
Kaseki Sousei Reborn II: Monster Digger	Yes	No						Yes	No	No	
Katou Hifumi Kudan: Shougi Kyoushitsu	Yes	No						Yes	No	No	
Kawaii Pet Shop Monogatari	Yes	No						Yes	No	No	
Ken Griffey Jr. Presents Major League Baseball	No	No						No	Yes	Yes	
Kettou Beast Wars: Beast Senshi Saikyou Ketteisen	Yes	No			Yes	Yes		Yes	No	No	
Kid Icarus: Of Myths and Monsters	No	No	Yes					No	Yes	Yes	
Killer Instinct	No	No				Yes		No	Yes	Yes	
Kindaichi Shounen no Jikenbo: 10 nenme no Shoutaijou	Yes	No						Yes	No	No	
The King Of Fighters '95	No	No			Yes	Yes		Yes	Yes	Yes	
The King Of Fighters: Heat of Battle	No	Yes			Yes	Yes		Yes	No	Yes	
Kinniku Banzuke GB: Chousensha wa Kimida!	Yes	No						Yes	No	No	
Kinniku Banzuke GB2: Mezase! Muscle Champion	Yes	No						Yes	No	No	
Kirby's Block Ball	No	No						Yes	Yes	Yes	
Kirby's Dream Land	No	No	Yes					Yes	Yes	Yes	
Kirby's Dream Land 2	No	No			Yes			Yes	Yes	Yes	
Kirby's Pinball Land	No	No	Yes					Yes	Yes	Yes	
Kirby's Star Stacker	No	Yes			Yes			Yes	Yes	Yes	
Koguru Guruguru: Guruguru to Nakayoshi	Yes	No						Yes	No	No	
Koukiatsu Boy	No	No						Yes	No	No	
Konami GB Collection Vol.1	No	Yes						Yes	No	No	Also released in Europe for GBC without enhancements.
Konami GB Collection Vol.2	No	Yes						Yes	No	No	Also released in Europe for GBC without enhancements.
Konami GB Collection Vol.3	No	Yes						Yes	No	No	Also released in Europe for GBC without enhancements.
Konami GB Collection Vol.4	No	Yes						Yes	No	No	Also released in Europe for GBC without enhancements.
Konchuu Hakase	No	No						Yes	No	No	
Konchuu Hakase 2	Yes	No						Yes	No	No	
Koushien Pocket	Yes	No						Yes	No	No	
Kuma no Puutarou: Takara Sagashi da Ohiri Game Battle!	No	No						Yes	No	No	
Kuusou Kagaku Sekai Gulliver Boy: Kuusou Kagaku Puzzle Puritto Pon	No	No						Yes	No	No	
Legend of the River King GBC Legend of the River King GB ^{EU} Kawa no Nushi Tsuri 3 ^{JP}	Yes	Yes						Yes	Yes	Yes	
Legend of the River King 2 Kawa no Nushi Tsuri 4 ^{JP}	Yes	No						Yes	Yes	Yes	Box and cart show SGB logo but no SGB enhancements.
The Legend of Zelda: Link's Awakening	No	No	Yes					Yes	Yes	Yes	
The Legend of Zelda: Link's Awakening DX	Yes	No						Yes	Yes	Yes	
Lil' Monster Gem Gem Monster ^{JP}	Yes	No						Yes	Yes	No	
The Lion King	No	No						No	Yes	Yes	Box and cart show SGB logo but no SGB enhancements.
Little Indian In Big City	No	No		Yes				No	No	Yes	
Lodoss Tou Senki: Eiyuu Kishiden GB	Yes	Yes		Yes				Yes	No	No	
Loppi Puzzle Magazine: Hirameku 2	Yes	No						Yes	No	No	
Loppi Puzzle Magazine: Hirameku Puzzle Dai-2-Gou	Yes	No						Yes	No	No	
Loppi Puzzle Magazine: Hirameku Puzzle Dai-3-Gou	Yes	No						Yes	No	No	
Loppi Puzzle Magazine: Hirameku Puzzle Soukangou	Yes	No						Yes	No	No	
Loppi Puzzle Magazine: Kangaeru Puzzle Dai-2-Gou	Yes	No						Yes	No	No	
Loppi Puzzle Magazine: Kangaeru Puzzle Dai-3-Gou	Yes	No						Yes	No	No	
Loppi Puzzle Magazine: Kangaeru Puzzle Soukangou	Yes	No						Yes	No	No	
The Lost World: Jurassic Park	No	No						No	Yes	Yes	
Luca no Puzzle de Daibouken!	Yes	No						Yes	No	No	
Mach Go Go Go	No	No						Yes	No	No	
Madden '95	No	No						No	Yes	Yes	No special border.
Madden '96	No	No		Yes		Yes		No	Yes	Yes	Controller changes are disabled.
Madden '97	No	No			Yes			No	Yes	No	
Madden 2000	Yes	No						No	Yes	Yes	
Mahjong Joou	Yes	No						Yes	No	No	
Mahjong Quest	Yes	No						Yes	No	No	
Mahou Knishi Rayearth	No	Yes						Yes	No	No	
Mahou Knishi Rayearth 2nd: The Missing Colors	No	No						Yes	No	No	
Mahoujin Guru Guru	No	No						Yes	No	No	
Majokko Mari-chan no Kisekae Monogatari	Yes	No						Yes	No	No	
Marie no Atelier GB	Yes	No						Yes	No	No	
Mario's Picross	No	Yes						Yes	Yes	Yes	
Marmalade Boy	No	No						Yes	No	No	
Masakari Densetsu Kintarou RPG-hen	No	Yes						Yes	No	No	
Maui Mallard in Cold Shadow	No	No						No	Yes	No	Box and cart show SGB logo but no SGB enhancements.
Medarot: Kabuto Version	No	No						Yes	No	No	
Medarot: Kuwagata Version	No	No						Yes	No	No	
Medarot Parts Collection	No	No						Yes	No	No	
Medarot Parts Collection 2	No	No						Yes	No	No	
Medarot 2: Kabuto Version	Yes	No						Yes	No	No	
Medarot 2: Kuwagata Version	Yes	No						Yes	No	No	
Medarot 2: Parts Collection	Yes	No						Yes	No	No	
Medarot Cardrobottle: Kabuto Version	Yes	No						Yes	No	No	
Medarot Cardrobottle: Kuwagata Version	Yes	No						Yes	No	No	
Mega Man V Rockman World 5 ^{JP}	No	No						Yes	Yes	Yes	
Megami Tensei Gaiden: Last Bible II	Yes	No						Yes	No	No	Also released for the original GB without enhancements.
Meitantei Conan: Chika Yuuenchi Satsujin Jiken	No	No						Yes	No	No	
Meitantei Conan: Giwaku no Gouka Ressha	No	No						Yes	No	No	
Meitantei Conan: Karakuri Jiin Satsujin Jiken	Yes	No						Yes	No	No	
Meitantei Conan: Kigantou Hihou Densetsu	Yes	No						Yes	No	No	
Meitantei Conan: Norowareta Kouro	Yes	No						Yes	No	No	
Men in Black: The Series	Yes	No						No	Yes	Yes	
Metroid II: Return of Samus	No	No	Yes					Yes	Yes	Yes	
Mickey Mouse: Magic Wands! Mickey Mouse V: Mahou no Stick ^{JP} Mickey Mouse V: Zauberstäbe! ^{DE}	No	No						Yes	Yes	Yes	Originally released in Japan without enhancements.
Midori No Makibaoo	No	Yes						Yes	No	No	
Mighty Morphin Power Rangers	No	No						No	Yes	Yes	
Mighty Morphin Power Rangers: The Movie	No	No						No	Yes	Yes	
Mini 4 Boy	No	No						Yes	No	No	
Mini 4 Boy 2	No	Yes			Yes			Yes	No	No	
Mini-Yonku GB: Let's & Go!!	No	No						Yes	No	No	
Mini-Yonku GB: Let's & Go!! All-Star Battle MAX	No	No						Yes	No	No	
Mogu Mogu Gombo: Harukanaru Chou Ryouri Densetsu	No	No						Yes	No	No	
Mole Mania Moguraanya ^{JP}	No	No		Yes				Yes	Yes	Yes	
Momotarou Collection	No	Yes						Yes	No	No	
Momotarou Collection 2	No	Yes						Yes	No	No	
Momotarou Dengeki 2	No	No						Yes	No	No	
Momotarou Dentetsu Jr.: Zenkoku Ramen Meguri no Maki	No	No						Yes	No	No	
Money Idol Exchanger	No	No						Yes	No	No	
Monkey Puncher Saru Puncher ^{JP}	Yes	No						Yes	No	Yes	
Monopoly	No	No						Yes	Yes	Yes	Box and cart show SGB logo but no SGB enhancements.
Monopoly Game Boy Monopoly ^{JP}	Yes	No						Yes	No	No	
Monster Race	No	No						Yes	No	No	
Monster Race 2	Yes	No						Yes	No	No	
Monster Race Okawari	No	No						Yes	No	No	
Monster Rancher Battle Card GB Monster Farm Battle Card GB ^{JP}	Yes	No						Yes	Yes	No	
Mortal Kombat 4	Yes	No						No	Yes	Yes	
Ms. Pac-Man: Special Color Edition	Yes	No					No	No	Yes	No	
Mystical Ninja Starring Goemon Ganbare Goemon: Kurofune Tou no Nazo ^{JP}	No	No						Yes	Yes	Yes	
Nada Asatarou & Kojima Takeo no Jissen Mahjong Kyoushitsu	No	No						Yes	No	No	
Namco Gallery Vol 1	No	Yes						Yes	No	No	
Namco Gallery Vol 2	No	Yes						Yes	No	No	
Namco Gallery Vol 3	No	Yes						Yes	No	No	
NBA 3 on 3 featuring Kobe Bryant	Yes	No						No	Yes	No	
NBA in the Zone	Yes	Yes						No	Yes	Yes	
NBA Live 96	No	No						No	Yes	Yes	
Nectaris GB	No	No						Yes	No	No	
Nekketsu! Beach Volley dayo Kunio-kun	No				Yes	Yes	Yes	Yes	No	No	
Nettou Garou Densetsu 2: Aratanaru Tatakai	No	No				Yes		Yes	No	No	
Nettou Real Bout Garou Densetsu Special	No	No			Yes	Yes		Yes	No	No	
Nettou Samurai Spirits: Zankurou Musouken	No	Yes				Yes		Yes	No	No	
NHL Hockey '95	No	No						No	Yes	Yes	
NHL Hockey '96	No	No						No	Yes	Yes	
NHL Hockey 2000	Yes	No						No	Yes	Yes	
Nihon Daihyou Team: Eikou no Eleven	No	No						Yes	No	No	
Ninku	No	No						Yes	No	No	
Ninku Dai 2 Dan: Ninkuu Sensou-hen	No	Yes						Yes	No	No	
Nintama Rantarou GB	No	No				Yes		Yes	No	No	
Nintama Rantarō GB: Eawase Challenge Puzzle	No	No				Yes		Yes	No	No	
Nobunaga no Yabou Game Boy Ban 2	Yes	No						Yes	No	No	
Oddworld Adventures	No	No						No	Yes	Yes	Box and cart show SGB logo but no SGB enhancements.
Ohasuta Yamachan & Raymond	Yes	No						Yes	No	No	
Olympic Summer Games: Atlanta 1996	No	No		Yes	Yes			No	Yes	Yes	Controller changes are disabled.
Oni V: Oni wo Tsugumono	No	No						Yes	No	No	
Othello World	No	Yes						Yes	No	No	
Otogi Banasi Taisen	No	No						Yes	No	No	
Ou Dorobou Jing: Angel Version	Yes	No						Yes	No	No	
Ou Dorobou Jing: Devil Version	Yes	No						Yes	No	No	
Owarai Yowiko no Game-dou: Oyaji Sagashite Sanchoume	Yes	No						Yes	No	No	
Oyatsu Quiz: Mogu Mogu Q	No	Yes						Yes	No	No	
Pachinko CR Daiku no Gen-san GB	No	No						Yes	No	No	
Pachinko Data Card: Chou Ataru-kun	No	No						Yes	No	No	
Pachinko Monogatari Gaiden	No	No						Yes	No	No	
Pachi-slot Hisshou Guide GB	No							Yes	No	No	
Pachi Pachi Pachi-Slot: New Pulsar-hen	Yes	No						Yes	No	No	
Pac-Attack Pac-Panic ^{EU, JP}	No							Yes	Yes	Yes	
Pac-In-Time	No	No						Yes	Yes	Yes	
Pac-Man: Special Color Edition	Yes	No					No	No	Yes	No	
The Pagemaster	No	No		Yes	Yes			No	Yes	Yes	
PGA European Tour	No	No						No	Yes	Yes	
PGA Tour 96	No	No						No	Yes	Yes	
Picross 2	No	Yes						Yes	No	No	
Pocket Bomberman	Yes	Yes						Yes	Yes	Yes	In Japan, released only for the original GB. In North America, released only for GBC, although this version is compatible with the original GB. In Europe, released both for the original GB and GBC.
Pocket Densha	No	Yes						Yes	No	No	
Pocket Densha 2	Yes	Yes						Yes	No	No	
Pocket Family	No	No						Yes	No	No	
Pocket G1 Stable	Yes	No						Yes	No	No	
Pocket Kanjirou	No	No						Yes	No	No	
Pocket King	Yes	No						Yes	No	No	
Pocket Kyoro-chan	No	No						Yes	No	No	
Pocket Love	No	No						Yes	No	No	
Pocket Love 2	No	No						Yes	No	No	
Pocket Monsters: Blue	No	No						Yes	No	No	
Pocket Monsters: Red and Green	No	No						Yes	No	No	
Pocket Puyo Puyo 2	No	No				Yes		Yes	No	No	
Pocket Puyo Puyo Sun	Yes	No						Yes	No	No	
Pocket Shougi	No	No						Yes	No	No	
Pokémon: Gold Version and Silver Version	Yes	No						Yes	Yes	Yes	
Pokémon: Red Version and Blue Version	No	No						No	Yes	Yes	
Pokémon: Yellow Version	No	No						Yes	Yes	Yes	European and North American versions (but not the Japanese version) have the technical specifications of a GBC game.
Pokémon Pinball	Yes	No						Yes	Yes	Yes	
Pokémon Trading Card Game Pokémon Card GB ^{JP}	Yes	Yes						Yes	Yes	Yes	
Pokonyan! Yume no Daibouken	No	Yes		Yes	Yes			Yes	No	No	
Power Pro GB	No	No						Yes	No	No	
Power Pro Kun Pocket	Yes	No						Yes	No	No	
Power Pro Kun Pocket 2	Yes	No						Yes	No	No	
Power Quest Gekitou Power Modeller ^{JP}	Yes	Yes				Yes		Yes	Yes	Yes	Released only for the original GB in Japan.
Poyon no Dungeon Room	Yes	No						Yes	No	No	
Primal Rage	No	No						No	Yes	Yes	Box and cart show SGB logo but no SGB enhancements.
Pro Mahjong Kiwame GB	No	No			Yes			Yes	No	No	
Pro Mahjong Kiwame GB II	Yes	No						Yes	No	No	
Pro Mahjong Tsuwamono GB	Yes	No						Yes	No	No	
Puchi Carat	Yes	No						Yes	No	Yes	
Purikura Pocket	No	No						Yes	No	No	
Purikura Pocket 2	No	No						Yes	No	No	
Purikura Pocket 3	No	No						Yes	No	No	
Puyo Puyo	No	No				Yes		Yes	No	No	
Puyo Puyo Gaiden: Puyo Wars	Yes	No						Yes	No	No	
Puzzle Nintama Rantarou GB	No	Yes				Yes		Yes	No	No	
Qix	No	No	Yes					Yes	Yes	Yes	
Quest: Fantasy Challenge Holy Magic Century ^{EU}	Yes	No						No	Yes	Yes	
Quest: Brian's Journey Elemental Tale - Jack no Daibouken: Daimaou no Gyakushuu ^{JP}	Yes	No						Yes	No	No	
Quest for Camelot	Yes	No		Yes				No	Yes	Yes	
Radar Mission	No	No	Yes					Yes	Yes	No	
Real Pro Yakyuu!: Central League Hen	Yes	No						Yes	No	No	
Real Pro Yakyuu!: Pacific League Hen	Yes	No						Yes	No	No	
Renju Club: Gomoku Narabe	No	No						Yes	No	No	
Revelations: The Demon Slayer Megami Tensei Gaiden: Last Bible ^{JP}	Yes	No						Yes	Yes	No	Also released in Japan for the original GB without enhancements.
Roadsters '98	Yes	No						No	Yes	No	Unreleased game.
Robopon: Sun Version Robot Ponkottsu: Sun Version ^{JP}	Yes	No						Yes	Yes	No	
Robot Ponkottsu: Comic Bom Bom Special Version	Yes	No						Yes	No	No	
Robot Ponkottsu: Moon Version	Yes	No						Yes	No	No	
Robot Ponkottsu: Star Version	Yes	No						Yes	No	No	
Rock'n Monster	No	Yes			Yes			Yes	No	No	
The Rugrats Movie	Yes	No						No	Yes	Yes	Also released for the original GB in North America.
Sakata Gorou Kudan no Renju Kyoushitsu	Yes	No						Yes	No	No	
SameGame	Yes	No						Yes	No	No	
Samurai Shodown Nettou Samurai Spirits ^{JP}	No	No				Yes		Yes	Yes	Yes	No special border.
San Goku Shi: Game Boy Ban 2	Yes	No						Yes	No	No	
Sanrio Timenet: Kako-hen	Yes	No						Yes	No	No	
Sanrio Timenet: Mirai-hen	Yes	No						Yes	No	No	
SD Hiryuu No Ken Gaiden	No	No				Yes		Yes	No	No	
SD Hiryuu No Ken Gaiden 2	No	No				Yes		Yes	No	No	
SD Hiryuu no Ken EX	Yes	No						Yes	No	No	
SeaQuest DSV	No	No						No	Yes	No	No special border.
Sei Hai Densetsu	Yes	No						Yes	No	No	
Selection I & II	No	Yes						Yes	No	No	
Senkai Ibunroku Juntei Taisen: TV Animation Senkaiden Houshin Engi Yori	Yes	No						Yes	No	No	
Shadowgate Classic Shadowgate Returns ^{JP}	Yes							Yes	Yes	Yes	
Shanghai Pocket	Yes	No						Yes	Yes	Yes	Not released for GBC in Japan.
Shaq Fu	No	No				Yes		No	Yes	No	
Shin Keiba Kizoku Pocket Jockey	Yes	No						Yes	No	No	
Shin Megami Tensei Devil Children: Aka no Shou	Yes	No						Yes	No	No	
Shin Megami Tensei Devil Children: Kuro no Shou	Yes	No						Yes	No	No	
Shin SD Gundam Gaiden: Knight Gundam Monogatari	No							Yes	No	No	
Shougi Saikyou	No	No						Yes	No	No	
The Shutokou Racing	Yes	No						Yes	No	No	
Small Soldiers	No	No			Yes			No	Yes	Yes	
The Smurfs	No	Yes		Yes				No	Yes	Yes	Originally released in Europe without enhancements.
Snoopy no Hajimete no Otsukai	No	No						Yes	No	No	
Solar Striker	No	No	Yes					Yes	Yes	Yes	
Soreike! Anpanman: Fushigi na Nikoniko Album	Yes	No						Yes	No	No	
Soukoban Densetsu - Hikari to Yami no Kuni	Yes	No						Yes	No	No	
Space Invaders	No	Yes						No	Yes	Yes	A full 16-bit port of Space Invaders DX is enabled.
Spirou	No	No						No	No	Yes	
Sports Illustrated: Golf Classic Golf Classic ^{EU}	No	No						No	Yes	Yes	
Star Ocean: Blue Sphere	Yes	No						Yes	No	No	
Star Sweep	No	Yes						Yes	No	No	
Star Trek Generations: Beyond the Nexus	No	No						No	Yes	Yes	No special border.
Street Fighter II	No	Yes				Yes		Yes	Yes	Yes	
Super B-Daman: Fighting Phoenix	No	Yes						Yes	No	No	
Super Black Bass Super Black Bass Pocket ^{JP}	No	Yes						Yes	No	No	
Super Black Bass Pocket 2	No	Yes						Yes	No	No	
Super Bombliss DX	Yes	Yes						Yes	No	No	
Super Breakout	Yes	No						No	Yes	Yes	Box back shows SGB logo but no SGB enhancements.
Super Chinese Fighter GB	No	No				Yes		Yes	No	No	
Super Chinese Land 1-2-3 Dash	No	Yes				Yes		Yes	No	No	Multiplayer is available only for the third game.
Super Chinese Land 3	No	No				Yes		Yes	No	No	
Super Mario Land	No	No	Yes					Yes	Yes	Yes	
Super Mario Land 2: 6 Golden Coins	No	No	Yes					Yes	Yes	Yes	
Super Pachinko Taisen	No	No						Yes	No	No	
Super Robot Taisen: Link Battler	Yes	No						Yes	No	No	
Super Star Wars: Return of the Jedi	No	No						No	Yes	Yes	
Super Street Basketball 2	No	No						Yes	No	No	
Superman	Yes	No		Yes				No	Yes	Yes	Controller changes are disabled.
Survival Kids Stranded Kids ^{EU}	Yes	No						Yes	Yes	Yes	
Survival Kids 2: Dasshutsu!! Futago Shima!	Yes	No						Yes	No	No	
Sweet Ange	Yes	No						Yes	No	No	
Sylvania Family: Otogi no Kuni no Pendant	Yes	No						Yes	No	No	
Sylvania Melody: Mori no Nakama to Odori Mashi!	Yes	No						Yes	No	No	
Tales of Phantasia: Narikiri Dungeon	Yes	No						Yes	No	No	
Tamagotchi Game de Hakken!! Tamagotchi ^{JP}	No	Yes						Yes	Yes	Yes	
Tanimura Hitoshi Ryuu Pachinko Kouryaku Daisakusen: Don Quijote ga Iku	Yes	No						Yes	No	No	
Tennis	No	No	Yes					Yes	Yes	Yes	
Tetris	No	No	Yes					Yes	Yes	Yes	
Tetris 2 Tetris Flash ^{JP}	No	Yes						Yes	Yes	Yes	Originally released without enhancements.
Tetris Attack Yoshi no Panepon ^{JP}	No	Yes						Yes	Yes	Yes	
Tetris Blast Super Bombliss ^{JP}	No	Yes						Yes	Yes	Yes	
Tetris DX	Yes	Yes						Yes	Yes	Yes	Different border when played on Super Game Boy 2.
Tetris Plus	No	No						Yes	Yes	Yes	
Tintin In Tibet	No	No		Yes				No	No	Yes	Also released for GBC without enhancements.
TNN Outdoors Fishing Champ Super Black Bass Pocket 3 ^{JP}	Yes	Yes						Yes	Yes	No	
Tokimeki Memorial Pocket: Culture-hen: Komorebi no Melody	Yes	Yes						Yes	No	No	Controller changes are disabled.
Tokimeki Memorial Pocket: Sports-hen: Koutei no Photograph	Yes	Yes						Yes	No	No	Controller changes are disabled.
Tokoro's Mahjong Jr.	No	No						Yes	No	No	
Tokyo Disneyland: Fantasy Tour	No	No						Yes	No	No	
Tokyo Disneyland: Mickey no Cinderella Jou Mystery Tour	No	No						Yes	No	No	
Totsugeki! Papparatai	Yes	No						Yes	No	No	
Tottemo! Luckyman: Lucky Cookie Minna Daisuki!!	No	Yes						Yes	No	No	
Trade & Battle Card Hero	Yes	No		Yes				Yes	No	No	
Tsume Go Series 1: Fujisawa Hideyuki Meiyo Kisei	No	No						Yes	No	No	
Tsume Shougi	No	No						Yes	No	No	
Tsuri Sensei	No	No						Yes	No	No	
Tsuri Sensei 2	Yes	No						Yes	No	No	
TV Champion	No	No						Yes	No	No	
Ultraman Ball	No	No						Yes	No	No	
Ultraman Chou Toushi Gekiden	No	Yes						Yes	No	No	
Umi no Nushi Tsuri 2	No	Yes			Yes			Yes	No	No	
Uno 2: Small World	No	No		Yes				Yes	No	No	
Urban Strike	No	No						No	Yes	Yes	
Vegas Stakes	No	Yes						No	Yes	Yes	
Wave Race	No	No						No	Yes	Yes	
Wario Blast: Featuring Bomberman!	No	No			Yes	Yes	Yes	No	Yes	Yes	Released as Bomberman GB in Japan.
Wario Land: Super Mario Land 3	No	No	Yes					Yes	Yes	Yes	
Wario Land II	No	Yes		Yes				No	Yes	Yes	Not released for GB in Japan.
Wario Land II	Yes	Yes		Yes				Yes	Yes	Yes	GBC version released worldwide.
Wedding Peach: Jama-P Panic	No	Yes						Yes	No	No	
Wetrix Wetrix GB ^{JP}	Yes	No			Yes	No	No	Yes	No	No	
WildSnake Super Snakey ^{JP}	No	Yes						Yes	Yes	No	
World Cup 98	No	No			Yes			No	Yes	Yes	
World Heroes 2 Jet	No	No				Yes		Yes	Yes	Yes	
WWF War Zone	No	No						No	Yes	Yes	Box and cart show SGB logo but no SGB enhancements.
X	No	No	Yes					Yes	No	No	
Yakuman	No	No	Yes					Yes	No	No	
Yoshi Yoshi no Tamago ^{JP} Mario & Yoshi ^{EU, AUS}	No	No	Yes					Yes	Yes	Yes	
Yoshi's Cookie	No	No	Yes					Yes	Yes	Yes	
Yu-Gi-Oh! Duel Monsters	No	No						Yes	No	No	
Yu-Gi-Oh! Duel Monsters II: Dark Duel Stories	Yes	No						Yes	No	No	
Yu-Gi-Oh! Monster Capsule GB	Yes	Yes						Yes	No	No	
YuYu Hakusho Dai 4 Dan: Makai Touitsu-hen	No	No				Yes		Yes	No	No	
Zen Nippon Pro Wrestling Jet	No	No				Yes		Yes	No	No	
Zoids: Jashin Fukkatsu! Genobreaker-hen	Yes	No						Yes	No	No	

== See also ==
- Lists of Game Boy games
