= Atomic Punk =

1990 video game

- North American cover art
- Developer: Hudson Soft
- Publisher: Hudson Soft
- Designers: Toshimasa Ebina; Takahiro Haga
- Composer: Yasuhiko Fukuda
- Series: Bomberman
- Platforms: Game Boy, Game Boy Color
- Release: Game Boy: JP: August 31, 1990; NA: October 1991; EU: 1991; Game Boy Color: KOR: June 2003
- Genre: Maze
- Modes: Single-player, multiplayer

Atomic Punk (Note: Known in Japan as Bomber Boy (ボンバーボーイ, Bonbā Bōi) and in Europe as Dynablaster) is a maze video game developed and published by Hudson Soft for the Game Boy. Part of the Bomberman series, it was first released in Japan on August 31, 1990. It was later published in North America in October 1991 and Europe in 1991.

There are three game modes in Atomic Punk, all of which share a top-down perspective and the gameplay utilizing bombs to demolish obstacles and defeat opponents. The first one is a single-player campaign where the player controls the titular character, embarking on an adventure across eight levels filled with environmental hazards while getting equipped with power-ups to upgrade his abilities. The second is a port of Bomberman (1985) on the Nintendo Entertainment System. The third is a multiplayer battle mode that requires the Game Link Cable accessory, pitting two players against each other.

Atomic Punk received generally positive reviews upon release for its gameplay, presentation, and multiplayer mode, with numerous critics highlighting that it had multiple titles in one package. It was re-released as part of the 1996 compilation Bomberman Collection in Japan, and was also ported to the Game Boy Color as part of another compilation Bomberman Selection, which was published in South Korea in 2003.

== Gameplay ==
Atomic Punk installs and detonates his bombs to defeat an enemy and demolish environmental obstacles.

Atomic Punk is a maze video game with a top-down perspective. It has three game modes: Game A, a single-player mode starring Atomic Punk; Game B, another single-player campaign featuring Bomberman; and Vs. Mode, multiplayer content.

In Game A, the player controls the eponymous character. In the manual of the North American version, Atomic Punk is a son of Bomberman, the protagonist of Bomberman (1985) on the Nintendo Entertainment System (NES). The two reside in the peaceful land of Atomica, which is invaded by the Nukies, radiation thieves trying to steal the energy from Atomica. While the Atomicans are imprisoned in the Nukies' nuclear factories, Atomic Punk embarks on an adventure to rescue his people and defeat the evil thieves. The Japanese and European versions do not provide any storyline for the campaign.

There are eight levels, representing the Nukies' factories. They are given names like Hevol, Grad, and Faria. Every factory level consists of several smaller stages, which are mazes filled with blocks and enemies. Atomic Punk is armed with bombs that can destruct the blocks and defeat his adversaries. The objective in each stage is to eliminate all enemies and discover the randomly placed exit hidden under a block.

Before entering a stage, the player can select power-up panels to equip Atomic Punk with. The power-up panels are acquired by visiting My Town in the world map screen and purchasing them with money. The player earns money by clearing stages quickly and destroying blocks. Alternatively, the panels can be found rarely within blocks. Clearing each factory will unlock a new power-up panel to buy in My Town. The player can stock up to 30 power-up panels into the inventory, and Atomic Punk can equip up to 10 of them in a given stage.

The power-up panels upgrade Atomic Punk's abilities, such as enlarging his bomb capacity or increasing his speed. There are also certain special panels that provide extra help for Atomic Punk, but disappear after one stage. These include a remote control for Atomic Punk's bombs. An elixir item is also part of the panel collection, allowing Atomic Punk to survive after taking a hit and serving as the player's lives. If Atomic Punk spends all of the equipped elixirs and perishes, all equipped power-ups will be lost and it will declare game over, forcing the player to restart the level from the beginning. A password can be used to save the player's progress.

Atomic Punk has nonlinear gameplay where the player is able to complete the levels in any sequence. The sole exception is Faria, which is inaccessible until the player clears out the other seven levels. The levels have different themes and characteristics that affect how the player approaches them. For example, in Windria, the wind blows and changes its direction constantly, altering Atomic Punk's walking speed. In Grad, Atomic Punk has to use teleporters to navigate between quadrants that divide each stage. In the final level, Faria, the indestructible walls in mazes are replaced with flames that will kill Atomic Punk on contact, necessitating the player to move between them carefully.

The Game B mode is a port of Bomberman (1985), retaining the general gameplay and presentation. The player's goal is to guide Bomberman toward the exit hidden under destructible blocks after defeating all enemies. There are 50 levels in total. Bomberman can upgrade his abilities by finding a power-up panel under a block, once per level. Unlike the NES version, there is a continue function that lets the player resume the progress without having to memorize the level password.

The Vs. Mode in Atomic Punk is the Bomberman series' first battle mode, pitting two human players against each other. There is no option to play against a computer opponent. There are two sub-modes: Panel Mode, where the players have to collect power-up panels similarly to Game B, and Powerful Mode, where the players start with upgraded abilities by default.

== Development and release ==
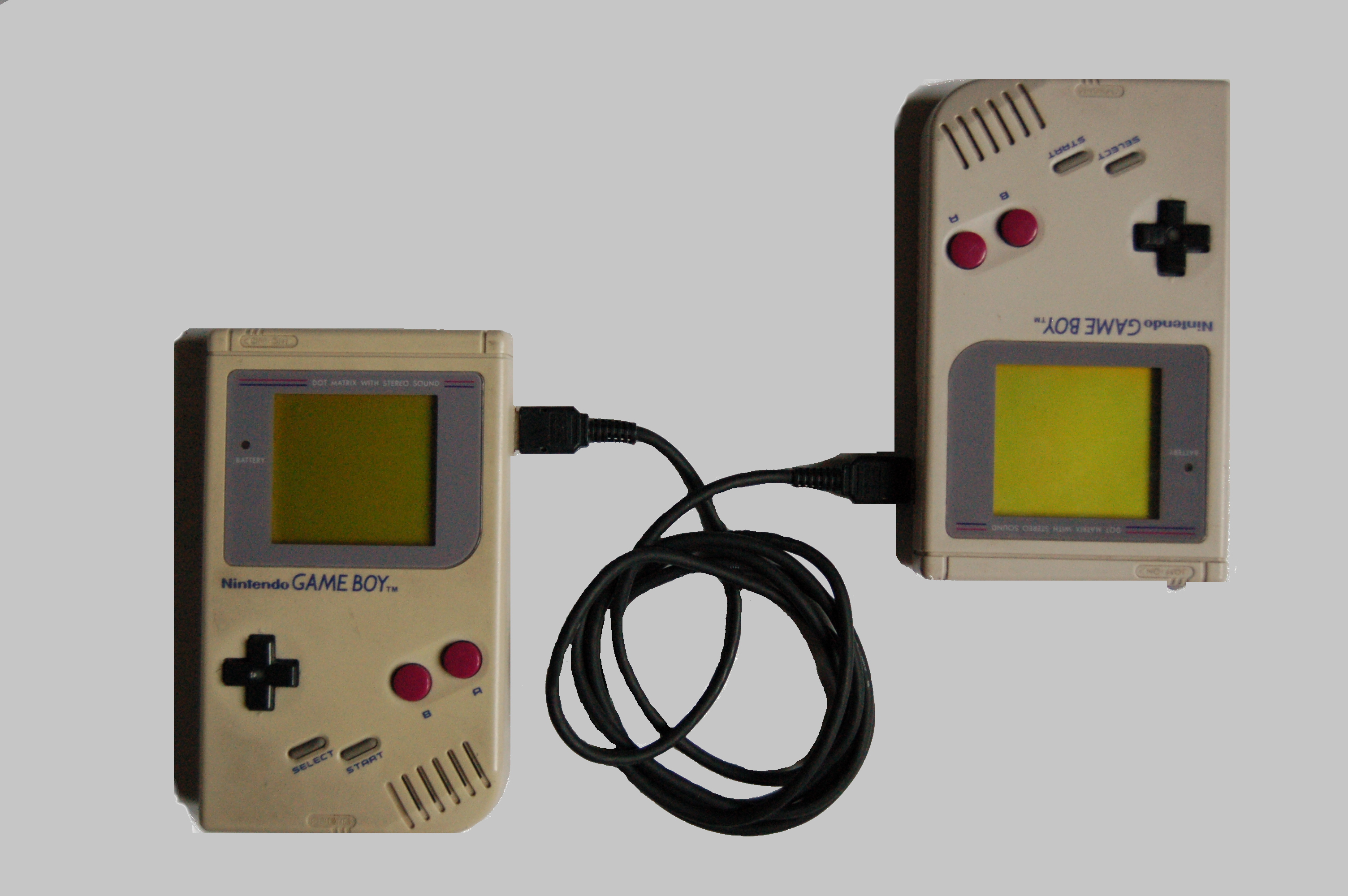
The Vs. Mode utilizes the Game Link Cable (pictured).

Atomic Punk was developed and published by Hudson Soft for the Game Boy. It was produced by a development team different from the ones behind the previous Bomberman games, being designed by Toshimasa Ebina, later joining the production crew of Ys IV: The Dawn of Ys, and Takahiro Haga, the director of Tengai Makyō III: Namida. The soundtrack was composed by Yasuhiko Fukuda.

Atomic Punk was first published in Japan on August 31, 1990. It coincided with the release of Bomberman (1990) for the TurboGrafx-16. It was released in North America in October 1991 and Europe in 1991. Atomic Punk is known as Bomber Boy in Japan and Dynablaster in Europe. The Dynablaster title was later re-used for several other European releases in the Bomberman series. The Vs. Mode requires two Game Boy consoles and the Game Link Cable accessory.

The Japanese version of Atomic Punk was re-released as part of the compilation Bomberman Collection alongside Bomberman GB and Bomberman GB 2. It supports the Super Game Boy accessory and was published on July 21, 1996. It was also ported to the Game Boy Color as part of another compilation Bomberman Selection, which was released in South Korea in June 2003.

== Reception ==
Reception

Review scores
Publication	Score
Computer and Video Games	82%
Famitsu	7, 7, 8, 5/10
Games-X	70%
GameZone	82/100
Total!	93%
Mean Machines	81%
N-Force	55%

Atomic Punk received generally favorable reviews upon release. Several critics described it as a Game Boy version of Bomberman (1990) for the TurboGrafx-16.

Reviewers praised Atomic Punk for having multiple games in a single package. Four reviewers from Famitsu praised that it had both a port of Bomberman (1985) on the NES and a new game. Total! claimed it had four games in one, referring to Game A, B, and two battle modes, and that it was one of the best Game Boy games to date. GamePro said one could buy two games for the price of one. GameZone was less impressed, stating that, despite promising three games in one, all of them were slight variations on the same theme. Nonetheless, it argued that said theme is unusual and can appeal to boys and girls.

Various elements of the gameplay were acclaimed. Some critics endorsed the multiplayer battle mode. Games-X found the two-player mode to be the real draw of the game, as the presence of the other player made it a lot more challenging, while not being excited about the single-player game modes. Others praised the password feature in the single-player campaigns. In a more negative review, N-Force described Atomic Punk as "remarkably unoriginal", and criticized that its game mechanics and objective were poorly explained.

The presentation was well received. Game Players remarked that, compared to Bomberman (1985) that had identical backgrounds for each maze, Atomic Punk had more variation. Total! said Atomic Punk is not anything special graphically, but it is as pretty as it needs to be. It also praised the sound effects and music.
