= Tales of Bliss and Heresy =

- Theatrical release poster
- Directed by: Noboru Iguchi
- Screenplay by: Noboru Iguchi
- Produced by: Noboru Iguchi
- Starring: Minase Yashiro; Arisa Nakamura; Airi Yamamoto; Yuichi Nakamura; Keita Okada; Benio Kokonoha; Daisuke Ohno; Mao (Seno Sister); Chiharu Inoue
- Cinematography: Kohei Matsubara
- Edited by: Yuhei Hashimoto
- Music by: Yasuhiko Fukuda
- Production company: Wonder Head
- Distributed by: Daizu, Wonder Head
- Release date: May 27, 2023 (Japan)
- Running time: 98 minutes
- Country: Japan
- Language: Japanese

Tales of Bliss and Heresy (Japanese: 異端の純愛, Hepburn: Itan no junnai) is a 2023 Japanese romance film directed and written by Noboru Iguchi.

The film is in an omnibus format consisting of three episodes: the first episode "Painful Shadows," the second episode "The One Armed Flower," and the third episode "The Table of Bataille."

== Plot ==
=== Part 1: Painful Shadows (うずく影, Uzuku Kage) ===
In the office of a design company, Tetsuya and Yumi work alone together. Tetsuya, who repeatedly engages in subtle harassment towards Yumi, eventually begins to sense the presence of a "shadow" behind Yumi. The relationship between Tetsuya, who is intimidated by the "shadow," and Yumi, who is accompanied by the "shadow," undergoes a strange transformation.

=== Part 2: The One Armed Flower (片腕の花, Kataude no Hana) ===
Yusuke Koide, a timid high school boy bullied by two girls in his class, meets a mysterious woman who has lost one arm in a cafe one day. Prompted by the woman to seek revenge, Yusuke's desire to kill the girls who bully him grows. Eventually, he becomes entangled in an incident involving his own sister.

=== Part 3: The Table of Bataille (バタイユの食卓, Bataiyu no Shokutaku) ===
Retsu Nihei, a lonely young man trapped in disgust towards himself for having to eat and excrete to survive due to childhood memories, meets a waitress named Tamako at a café. He ends up taking photos of Tamako, and as their relationship deepens over Tamako's "secret," it eventually turns into a destructive love affair.

== Cast ==
=== Part 1: Painful Shadows (うずく影, Uzuku Kage) ===
- Airi Yamamoto as Yumi (由美)
- Daiskue Ohno as Tetsuya (哲也)

=== Part 2: The One Armed Flower (片腕の花, Kataude no Hana) ===
- Keita Okada as Yusuke Koide (小出 裕輔)
- Minase Yashiro as Ami (アミ)
- Airi Yamamoto as Yusuke's sister
- Tomoharu Inoue as Classmate A
- Mao (Seno Sister) as Classmate B
- Yuichi Nakamura as Yusuke's sister's boyfriend

=== Part 3: The Table of Bataille (バタイユの食卓, Bataiyu no Shokutaku) ===
- Benio Kokonoha as Retsu Nihei (二瓶 烈)
- Arisa Nakamura as Tamako (珠子)

== Production ==
Noboru Iguchi had a project he deemed "absolutely essential to create" — a plan for the "ultimate pure love film" that would never pass as a commercial film. It depicted pure affection accompanied by a unique sexual preference that is not being understood by society, which even Iguchi himself struggled with.

Iguchi had hesitated for years to bring this project to light, but in light of the global pandemic of COVID-19, which he saw as an "uncertain future," he decided to produce this project in the form of an independent film. He resolved to shoot the first episode, "Painful Shadows," in April 2021 and began crowdfunding for film production costs on October 2, 2021, officially embarking on production.

Casting was primarily done with actors who had appeared in Iguchi's past directorial works, including Minase Yashiro from "The Machine Girl," Arisa Nakamura from "Zombie Ass," Airi Yamamoto from "Live," "シネマ純情," and "The Flowers of Evil," and Keita Okada from "Flowers of Evil."

The crowdfunding reached its goal in December 2021, and the film was completed in April 2022. Initially scheduled for theatrical release in August 2022, the release was delayed due to the impact of the pandemic, and it was eventually released in May 2023.

In February 2023, when the release was decided, crowdfunding for the film's promotion expenses began. Although this crowdfunding did not reach its goal amount, the movie was released as planned.

== Release and Reception ==
The film was released on May 27, 2023, at K's Cinema in Tokyo, and thereafter was screened at independent cinemas throughout Japan.

On December 1, 2023, the film started streaming on platforms like Apple TV, YouTube, and Amazon Prime Video. On February 14, 2024, the sale of Blu-ray Discs began on the production company's direct sales website.

On December 25, 2023, the film ranked 12th in the 2023 Japanese Film Ranking by the American movie review site Asian Movie Pulse.
