= Live (2014 film) =

- Poster
- Directed by: Noboru Iguchi
- Screenplay by: Noboru Iguchi
- Produced by: Hidehisa Chiwata; Hiroyuki Miura; Naohiko Ninomiya; Mana Fukui (co-producer); Shin'ichirô Inoue (executive producer)
- Starring: Yuki Yamada; Ito Ōno; Yūki Morinaga; Mari Iriki; Suzuka Morita; Airi Yamamoto; Asami Sugiura
- Cinematography: Yasutaka Nagano
- Edited by: Tsuyoshi Wada
- Music by: Yasuhiko Fukuda
- Release date: May 10, 2014 (Japan)
- Running time: 105 minutes
- Country: Japan
- Language: Japanese

Live (Japanese: ライヴ) is a 2014 Japanese horror mystery suspense film directed by Noboru Iguchi and starring Yuki Yamada which was released on 10 May 2014.

== Cast ==
- Yuki Yamada
- Ito Ōno
- Yūki Morinaga
- Mari Iriki
- Suzuka Morita
- Airi Yamamoto
- Asami Sugiura
- Kokone Sasaki
- Ryūnosuke Kawai
- Mitsuki Koga
