= Hexcite =

1998 video game

Hexcite: The Shapes of Victory
- Cover art
- Developers: Gu Inc. Landwarf
- Producer: Ubi Soft
- Platform: Game Boy Color
- Release: JP: 21 October 1998; NA: January 1999
- Genre: Puzzle
- Modes: Single-player, multiplayer

Hexcite: The Shapes of Victory is a 1998 Game Boy Color game developed by Gu Inc. in Japan and Landwarf in North America, and published by Ubi Soft. The game was a launch title for the Japanese release of the Game Boy Color.

== Gameplay ==
A screenshot of Hexcite.

Hexcite is a competitive puzzle game where players gain points by placing randomly distributed playing pieces on a hexagonal playing board. Each player has a limited number of pieces, and is awarded points based on placement and coverage of shapes, with additional points for players who fill in one of the seven hexagons on the board. When all shapes have been placed, or there is no room left for the remaining shapes, the round ends. The player with the most points wins the round.

The game features several modes of play: one-player, two-player, linked games, level games and practice games. One-player games face the player against a computer opponent, whose skill level can be altered. Two-player games are facilitated by the Game Link Cable or Super Game Boy. Level games involve a series of increasingly difficult games in which the player raises their status by winning consecutively. Practice games are simplified games in which the player solves puzzles one piece at a time, with hints offered by the computer.

== Reception ==
Reception

Review scores
Publication	Score
AllGame	2.5/5
Game Boy Xtreme	80%
Total Games	85%
Planet Game Boy	4/5

Hexcite received lukewarm reviews, with critics praising the innovativeness of the puzzle gameplay. Total Games stated "new and original puzzle games are a rarity these days, and ones that are easy to play first time out are even more scarce". Game Boy Xtreme disagreed, stating that "this one's okay when you get the hang of it, but tricky at first". Planet Game Boy provided a balanced review, noting that the game was fundamentally "a simple idea that works", and a "refreshing alternative to the other puzzlers out there", but noting the computer can take "ages to take a move" and the game "doesn't look anything special".
