= Alleyway (video game) =

1989 video game

- European box art
- Developers: Nintendo R&D1; Intelligent Systems
- Publisher: Nintendo
- Designer: Gunpei Yokoi
- Composer: Kenji Yamamoto
- Platform: Game Boy
- Release: JP: April 21, 1989; NA: August 1, 1989; EU: September 28, 1990
- Genre: Breakout clone
- Mode: Single-player

Alleyway (Note: Japanese: アレイウェイ, Hepburn: Areiwei) is a 1989 video game developed by Nintendo and Intelligent Systems and published by Nintendo for the Game Boy. It is a Breakout clone and one of the launch titles developed and released for the system. The game was released alongside the Game Boy, first in Japan in 1989, in North America later that year, and in Europe in 1990. It was later re-released for the Virtual Console on the Nintendo 3DS in June 2011, and on the Nintendo Switch Online service in May 2024.

The name Alleyway references the in-game gateway that the player's spaceship (represented as a paddle) must pass through. While Alleyway is a portable clone of Breakout, it adds several features, including alternating stages, bonus rounds, and hazards for the player at later levels. While the game's original box art featured an unidentifiable protagonist, later international releases of the game replaced the character with Mario. Alleyway was released with limited advertising, receiving moderate to low scores from reviewers who compared it to games like Arkanoid.

== Gameplay ==
The first stage

The player's objective in Alleyway is to clear all bricks in each stage using a ball and paddle while keeping the ball from falling into the pit below, similar to that of Breakout. The paddle's speed can be adjusted by holding either the B or A button on the controller while moving the paddle, which can move only horizontally at a fixed height. At the start of each life, the player can reposition the paddle before releasing the ball and commencing gameplay. When released, the ball will always begin at a 45° angle above the paddle aimed toward its center. The player starts the game with five paddles; each time the ball falls into the pit below the paddle, a paddle is removed and the ball is reset.

The game ends when all the player's paddles are depleted. An additional paddle is granted for every 1000 points scored until the player has over 10,000 points. The player may have up to nine paddles at once. The game lacks a continue feature, though the high score will be retained until the game is reset or turned off. As there is no battery-backed RAM or password feature, Alleyway can only be completed in one sitting on the Game Boy. This was later changed with the re-release of the game for the Nintendo 3DS's Virtual Console system, which allowed for in-game progress to be recorded to a single save state accessible at any time while playing the game.

=== Ball behavior ===
The ball will only travel at 15°, 30°, or 45° angles. If the ball hits a brick, the brick disappears and the ball ricochets in a different direction at the same angle. The ball's speed depends on the type of brick that it hits: gray and black bricks increase its speed, while white and square, indestructible bricks have no effect. A sound effect is also played when the ball collides with an object or wall, with walls producing the lowest pitch and black bricks the highest.

The ball's direction and speed can be controlled by the paddle's velocity and point of contact. Changing direction the moment the ball comes into contact with the paddle, called a snap technique, will bounce the ball upward with increased speed. Moving the paddle quickly in the opposite direction than the ball is headed will result in the ball bouncing in the same horizontal direction as the paddle at a 15° angle. If the player contacts the ball with the body of the paddle before it falls into the pit below, it will bounce back into the playing field. However, if instead, either corner of the paddle collides with the ball at that moment, it will be knocked directly into the pit.

Alleyway's ball cannot be locked in an infinite loop of ricochets. Whenever the ball starts to loop between objects such as the ceiling, indestructible blocks and/or the paddle itself, its velocity will change at a random point after the second cycle on its next collision. As a result, the ball will travel at a slightly raised or lowered angle depending on its current trajectory, and will break out of the loop.

=== Levels ===
A bonus stage modeled on Mario's body, as seen on the Super Game Boy

The game features 24 levels, based on eight block patterns in groups of three. After every three regular stages, the player proceeds to a bonus stage, giving the game a total of 32 levels. Most levels follow a generic design The player progresses to the next level once all bricks are destroyed. Every second stage is a Scrolling Block Screen, featuring bricks that move from left to right; every third is an Advancing Block Screen, where the bricks move downward the height of one regular brick in short bursts, increasing in speed as the ball bounces off the paddle. Any part of a brick below a height of ten bricks above the paddle is automatically removed; thus they cannot impede the player's movement but cannot contribute towards the player's score either.

As the player progresses through patterns, new elements are added to the gameplay. After the fourth stage, if the ball comes into contact with the top of the area, the paddle's size is halved until the stage is cleared or a life is lost. From this point on, the third stage variant features hidden bricks above the ceiling that descend progressively, using a similar—or same—layout that must also be cleared, meaning the pattern must be cleared twice. In later levels, bricks in the second stage variant may not move at the same speed or in the same direction. After the twelfth stage, indestructible bricks are incorporated into the brick patterns.

Bonus stages feature patterns based on various characters from Super Mario Bros., such as a Blooper, Bullet Bill or Bowser. Unlike regular levels, the ball will destroy blocks in these stages without ricocheting off them, and contact with the ceiling will not affect the paddle size. These stages are the only ones to feature background music during play, and cannot be paused. A timer is present for each bonus stage; it starts at 95 for the first and is reduced by five for each subsequent bonus stage completed beforehand. If the timer ends, the ball falls into the pit (no life is lost in this case), or all bricks are destroyed, the bonus stage ends. Destroying all bricks before the timer expires yields additional bonus points, which vary depending on the level. Once cleared, the brick pattern changes and gameplay reverts to the normal cycle. After finishing the final bonus round, the game then loops back to the first stage, allowing for infinite play.

=== Scoring ===
Points are awarded for destroying bricks based on their shade, with one point awarded for the lightest and three for the darkest. The player may earn additional points for completing the bonus stages, with the bonus starting at 500 for the first and reaching 1500 for the last five. The player's highest obtained score is recorded until the game is turned off.

The game only displays four digits of the player's score, yet it has a maximum value of 65,535. Scores of 10,000 and above are displayed as a combination of icons and the numerical display. For every 10,000 points, a sprite from the NES Super Mario Bros. game is shown below the numerical score. A fire flower is shown for 10,000 points, a mushroom for 20,000, and a starman for 30,000 points and above. The game stops changing the sprite after awarding the starman icon. As a result, the highest score that can be displayed is 39,999, but the maximum score of 65,535 is shown as 35,535. Once the maximum score has been reached, the score will roll over only if the player completes a bonus stage. A rollover does not affect the recorded high score.

== Development ==
Inspired by classic ball-and-paddle arcade games like Breakout and Arkanoid, Alleyway was among the launch titles for the Game Boy's debut in Japan, released alongside Baseball (a port of the NES game), Super Mario Land (an adaptation of the Mario franchise for the handheld format) and Yakuman (a Japanese mahjong game). Notably, Alleyway debuted two months before Tetris due to ongoing legal disputes between Nintendo and Tengen over the Tetris property.

Alleyway marks one of the first appearances of Mario on the Game Boy system alongside Super Mario Land, although its original box and cartridge art showed an unidentified character in a spacesuit piloting the paddle. The artwork was changed to show Mario at the controls on the game's international release, but neither the manual nor the back of the box refer to the Nintendo mascot's presence in the game. Nintendo Power's preview made no mention of Mario in the title other than note of the pattern of bricks in Mario's shape for the first bonus level. Official confirmation of the pilot being Mario only came about in 1990 with Club Nintendo's preview of the game's European release.

The game was one of the first titles made by the Nintendo R&D1 development team, alongside Tetris and Radar Mission. Years later, the game's designer Gunpei Yokoi would reuse much of Alleyway's source code (such as paddle behavior and adapted physics engine) for the Game Boy game Kirby's Block Ball while working with Shigeru Miyamoto's team.

== Release ==
Promotion of Alleyway in Nintendo-published material consisted of a segment taking up a third of the page the articles were on. Advertisements for the game were grouped with those for the Game Boy itself and other titles for the system. Years after its initial release, a two-page section in the Super Game Boy Nintendo Strategy Guide bundled with the Super Game Boy accessory appeared, which gave advice and color codes for the game.

Alleyway was re-released as a launch title for the Virtual Console system on the Nintendo 3DS on June 6, 2011, first in Japan and a year later in North America. It was re-released on the Nintendo Classics service in May 2024.

== Reception ==
Reception

Review scores
Publication	Score
AllGame	3.5/5
Electronic Gaming Monthly	6/10, 3/10, 6/10, 5/10
Famitsu	4/10, 6/10, 6/10, 3/10
GamesRadar+	2.5/5
Mean Machines	33%
Power Play (DE)	48%
Retro Gamer	31%

Although Alleyway sold well enough during its production run, it has not been re-released as a Nintendo Player's Choice title, and reviews of the game have been mostly mixed. Mean Machines gave the game a score of 33%, criticizing its repetitiveness and stating "this variant doesn't have much more to offer than the original [Breakout]". The magazine's staff added "once you've finished a couple of screens, you'll be bored stiff" and compared the game to its predecessor, Arkanoid, regarding the lack of power-ups in Alleyway. The four reviewers in Electronic Gaming Monthly compared it to Arkanoid, writing that it lacked enhancement over the Breakout format. In the Japanese magazine Famitsu, two reviewers desired more variation on the gameplay, with one writing that this was more apparent after playing Arkanoid and Nazo no Kabe: Block-kuzushi.

GamesRadar+ shared the sentiment in their review of the 3DS re-release, with reviewer Nathan Meunier giving it a score of 5/10 and stating that "Alleyway wasn't so hot when it first came out, and it still pales when put it side-by-side to other similarly priced offerings". He further added at times the game appeared to "hate" the player with its difficulty, though acknowledged that the addition of save states "takes some of the sting out of losing". Retro Gamer's Darran Jones called it "pretty piss-poor all the way back in 1989", noting the bland levels and lack of power-ups found in Arkanoid, and that many similar clones had outperformed it. The Famitsu reviewer who gave it the lowest score of the four said that as it just a block-breaking game, they wonder why it was even made available to a contemporary game audience.

Not all comments about the game have been negative. The two Electronic Gaming Monthly reviewers that gave the highest scores did state they felt the design was perfect for the Game Boy, one adding: "It's also a very good game that combines some new features ... with the original Break-Out theme" and concluding "Alleyway is good—but a bit long". Two reviewers in Famitsu said it may appeal to players looking for brief casual game sessions. German magazine Power Play gave the game a rating of 48%, complimenting some level design while saying Nintendo failed to bring enough. The book Rules of Play discusses the game as an example of improved design over a base core mechanic, citing the inclusion of distinct sound effects for ball collision as a means to praise the player for destroying bricks, and the varied level designs as "well done" and giving the player "an element of discovery to the overall experience". AllGame noted that despite the simplicity and variety, "Alleyway is fun to play", further adding that games of its kind "always play well on the Game Boy".
