= God Medicine =

1993 video game

God Medicine: Fantasy Sekai no Tanjou
- Box art of the game
- Developer: Konami
- Publisher: Konami
- Platform: Game Boy
- Release: JP: July 20, 1993
- Genre: Role-playing video game
- Mode: Single-player

God Medicine: Fantasy Sekai no Tanjou (ゴッドメディスン ファンタジー世界の誕生) is a role-playing video game released by Konami in 1993 for the Game Boy, only in Japan. An updated version of the game, God Medicine Fukkokuban (ゴッドメディスン復刻版), was re-released in 1998 through the Nintendo Power service, adding Super Game Boy support, a bestiary for encountered monsters and additional story elements.

== Story ==
A video gaming company was to release Phantom, their new RPG, but the company mysteriously is destroyed. Noah, Ken, and Miki are three RPG fans that are disappointed by this. Wandering about, they stumble upon a shack with a great demon inside, battling three warriors. The warriors are defeated and the demon exits through a portal. The warriors give their souls and powers to the three RPG fans, who now must enter Phantom to save the game's world. However, they must also protect the real world from the demon.

== Gameplay ==
God Medicine features standard RPG elements. The three characters can level up through battle and equip weapons and armor. Spells can be learned, as well as Maphu attacks. After the party collects Maphu gems and gains the special Maphu weapons, they can put the gems in the weapons. Each gem has a different effect depending on what character equips it. Some Maphu attacks need to be charged during battle first. The charges last even if the battle is finished. The player can save anytime, except in battle.

== Reception ==
Reception

Review score
Publication	Score
Famitsu	25/40
