= Airi Yamamoto =

Japanese actress (born 1992)

- 山本 愛莉
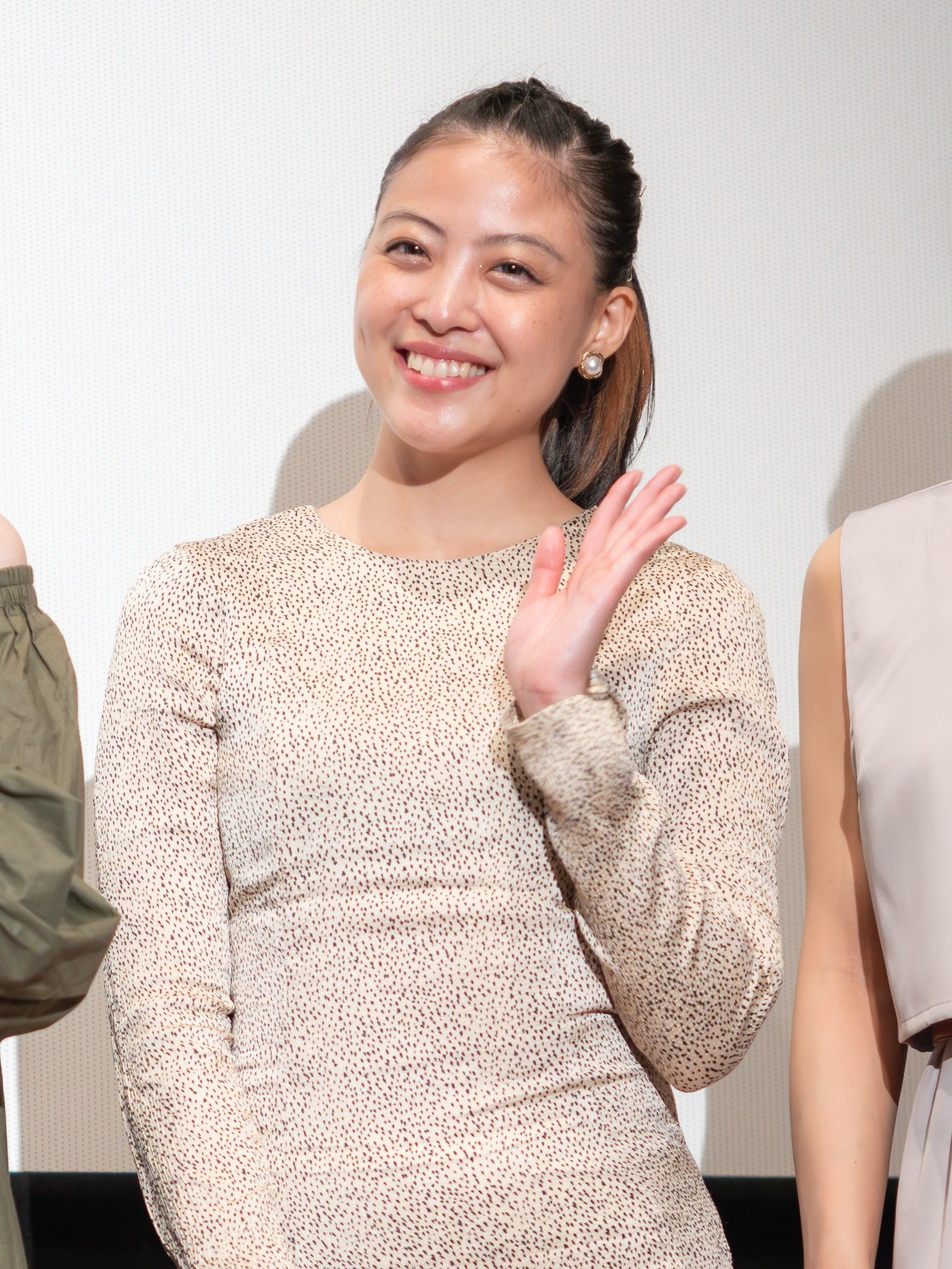
- Airi Yamamoto at the premiere stage greeting of the movie Tales of Bliss and Heresy
- Born: April 28, 1992 (age 34); Osaka Prefecture, Japan
- Occupations: Actress, model
- Years active: 2002 - present
- Height: 1.62 m (5 ft 4 in)

Airi Yamamoto (山本愛莉, Yamamoto Airi; born April 28, 1992) is a Japanese actress and model.

== Biography ==
Airi Yamamoto joined the entertainment agency Theatre Academy in 2002 and began her career as a child actor, appearing in television commercials, children's programs, TV dramas, and stage plays.

In 2007, she applied for the 32nd Horipro Talent Scout Caravan and advanced to the final competition. After that, she left Theatre Academy and continued her entertainment career.

Since 2012, she has been appearing in films, and in 2013, she appeared in "Matsuri-ni Saku Hana (祭りに咲く花)" and won the Best Supporting Actress Award at the 2nd Kashikojima Film Festival. In 2014, she appeared in Noboru Iguchi's film "Live," and has since repeatedly appeared in works directed by Iguchi.

== Personal life ==
She became friends with Rika Adachi during the selection camp of the 32nd Horipro Talent Scout Caravan, and they have continued to have personal interactions since then.

In August 2023, she went to Australia to study English and acting. She plans to stay there for one year.

== Filmography ==
=== Films ===
- Real Onigokko 3 (リアル鬼ごっこ3) (2012)
- Lesson of the Evil (悪の教典, Aku-no Kyoten) (2012), Nana Kubota (久保田菜々)
- Matsuri-ni Saku Hana (祭りに咲く花) (2013), Saori (沙織)
- Broken Pieces (こっぱみじん, Koppamijin) (2013)
- Live (ライヴ) (2014), Riko Kiritani (桐谷莉子)
- DAMAGER (自傷戦士ダメージャー, Jisho senshi Dameja) (2015), Mitsuko (美津子)
- Kusou Tokusatsu Kaiju Ledndo-ekkusu (空想特撮怪獣 巨人創造 LEDX -レッドエックス-) (2016), Sarana (サラーナ)
- キネマ純情 (Kinema Junjo) (2016), Ayano (アヤノ)
- The Flowers of Evil (惡の華, Aku-no Hana) (2019), TV reporter
- Koubou - Hitosuji-no Hikari (光芒―ひとすじの光) (produced in 2019, not released in theaters), Kenichi Kanda's daughter (神田健一の娘)
- Millennium Hope Hills (常葉の下で ―マジャライン―, Tokoha-no Shita-de -Majarain-) (produced in 2021, not released in theaters), Leading Actress (Character Name Unspecified)
- Tales of Bliss and Heresy (異端の純愛, Itan no junnai) (2023), Yumi (由美), Yusuke's sister

=== Television ===
- はぐれ刑事純情派スペシャル「帰ってきた安浦刑事 殉職...さらば夏目刑事」(EX, 2006), Aki (アキ)
- Sexy Voice and Robo (セクシーボイスアンドロボ) (NTV, 2007), Nico's classmate
- Samurai High School (サムライ・ハイスクール) (NTV, 2009), Shima Komaki (小牧志麻)
- Tensou Sentai Goseiger (天装戦隊ゴセイジャー) epic 17 (EX, 2010), Miyo Asai (浅井美代)
- Prison School (監獄学園-プリズンスクール-) (TBS, 2015), Kiyoshi's classmate
- Shin Minami no Teiō (新・ミナミの帝王) episode 12 (KTV, 2017), hostess bar owner
