= RoboGeisha =

- Release poster
- Directed by: Noboru Iguchi
- Written by: Noboru Iguchi
- Produced by: Yoshinori Chiba; Yōko Hayama; Satoshi Nakamura
- Starring: Aya Kiguchi; Hitomi Hasebe; Takumi Saito; Taro Shigaki
- Narrated by: Aya Kiguchi
- Cinematography: Yasutaka Nagano
- Music by: Yasuhiko Fukuda
- Production companies: T.O Entertainment; Pony Canyon
- Distributed by: Kadokawa Pictures
- Release date: October 3, 2009 (Japan)
- Running time: 101 minutes
- Country: Japan
- Language: Japanese
- Budget: ¥19.2 million (approx. $250,000)

RoboGeisha (Japanese: ロボゲイシャ) is a 2009 Japanese sci-fi action comedy film written and directed by Noboru Iguchi, visual effects directed by Tsuyoshi Kazuno, and special effects directed by Yoshihiro Nishimura. All three had previously worked together on The Machine Girl, and Nishimura worked on Tokyo Gore Police. The film premiered in theaters on October 3, 2009 and received generally negative reviews. The film's theme song is "Lost Control" by Art-School.

The film is about two sisters named Yoshie and Kikue Kasuga, Geishas who get abducted by a steel manufacturer in an attempt to transform them into murderous cyborg assassins.

== Plot ==
The film opens with an assassination attempt on a political candidate by a geisha who is revealed to be a cyborg assassin. She is accompanied by two women in tengu masks who dispatch the candidate's bodyguards using unconventional weapons, including shuriken fired from their buttocks. The candidate is attacked by the geisha's mouth-mounted circular saw, but is saved by the sudden arrival of another cyborg geisha, Yoshie Kasuga (Aya Kiguchi), who destroys the attacker.

In flashback, Yoshie and her older sister Kikue (Hitomi Hasebe) are orphaned geisha living in a traditional house. Kikue, the favored and talented sibling, constantly bullies the clumsy Yoshie. During a performance for Hikaru Kageno (Takumi Saito), heir to the powerful Kageno Steel corporation, Yoshie accidentally disrupts the event but impresses Hikaru with her beauty and an accidental display of superhuman strength when defending herself from Kikue's abuse.

Hikaru abducts the sisters and forces them into combat against each other. When Kikue attempts to kill Yoshie, the latter unconsciously unleashes her full strength and defeats her. Impressed, the Kageno corporation begins transforming Yoshie and other abducted young women into cyborg assassins (robogeisha), equipping them with weapons such as breast-mounted machine guns and katana blades protruding from various body parts. The women are indoctrinated to believe they are fighting terrorists for the greater good. Kikue, deemed inferior, is reduced to a servant.

Both sisters eventually receive extensive cybernetic enhancements. During their first mission, Kikue saves Yoshie's life but is gravely wounded and deemed unfit for further assassin duties. Meanwhile, Yoshie becomes the group's top operative.

Yoshie is later ordered to eliminate a group of survivors, family members of the abducted girls, who have been protesting outside the Kageno building. Learning the truth about the abductions, Yoshie turns against the corporation. The Kagenos threaten to kill the crippled Kikue unless Yoshie undertakes a suicide mission. Yoshie survives the explosion and is rescued and rebuilt by the survivors, led by a former Kageno engineer.

The survivors attempt to confront the Kagenos and expose their plan to detonate a super-bomb in Mount Fuji. The meeting is a trap, the Kageno patriarch and Hikaru, now themselves heavily cybernetised, massacre most of the survivors. Hikaru then activates his castle, transforming it into a giant robot controlled by his own movements, and prepares to launch the bomb.

Yoshie assaults the castle-robot, battling her former fellow assassins and the tengu-masked women. She is confronted by a fully restored and mind-controlled Kikue, now upgraded into a superior robogeisha model. Yoshie is defeated but manages to break through Kikue's programming by revealing long-suppressed family truths and expressing her love for her sister. The sisters reconcile and physically merge into a single, far more powerful robogeisha.

Together, they defeat Hikaru inside the giant robot. By tricking him into specific movements, they cause the castle-robot to redirect the bomb into space instead of Mount Fuji. The bomb detonates harmlessly in orbit, destroying the castle-robot. The film ends with Yoshie, in narration, imagining a peaceful life where she and Kikue are ordinary geisha together.

== Cast ==
- Aya Kiguchi as Yoshie Kasuga
- Hitomi Hasebe as Kikue Kasuga
- Takumi Saito as Hikaru Kageno
- Taro Shigaki as Kenyama Kageno
- Etsuko Ikuta as Kinu
- Suzuki Matuso as Kenta Gotokuji
- Naoto Takenaka as Rojin Kanai
- Asami Kumakiri as Kotone
- Shôko Nakahara as Hideko
- Asami Sugiura as Onna Tengu 1

== Release and reception ==
The film was part of the "U.S. Premieres" at Fantastic Fest 2009 (24 September – 1 October 2009). RoboGeisha was released in Japan on October 3, 2009 by Kadokawa Pictures. In January 2010, Funimation bought the rights to distribute the film. The film was released in North America on April 17, 2010 by way of ActionFest, then in New York City on May 18, 2010. The film circulated to different film festivals before going to DVD and Blu-ray on November 16, 2010.

== Soundtrack ==
RoboGeisha Original Motion Picture Soundtrack

Soundtrack album by Yasuhiko Fukuda
- Released: September 30, 2009
- Recorded: 2009
- Genre: Soundtrack
- Length: 71:55
- Label: DAIZ Inc.

All tracks are written by Yasuhiko Fukuda, except where noted.

RoboGeisha Original Sound Track
No.	Title	Length
1.	"ゲイシャは踊る"	1:46
2.	"影が往く"	0:15
3.	"変身"	0:25
4.	"天軍 ダァッ!!"	0:50
5.	"死ぬのはお前だ～Life and Death～"	2:31
6.	"Geisha Chainsaw Massacre"	0:54
7.	"鋼鉄の舞妓参上"	0:18
8.	"21st Century Geisha Wars"	0:56
9.	"追憶"	1:17
10.	"梅にも春" (Koharu Yanagiya)	1:36
11.	"ヨシエ 怒りの電話帳"	0:28
12.	"白衣の吸精魔"	0:37
13.	"吸精魔大襲撃"	0:33
14.	"天軍ミルク"	1:23
15.	"姉妹のテーマ"	1:50
16.	"天国 または 地獄の門"	1:01
17.	"悪い奴ほどよく喋る"	1:57
18.	"裏芸者鋼鉄軍団"	1:31
19.	"支配者の紋章"	0:21
20.	"避けえぬ対決 (Part1)"	1:41
21.	"闘技場"	0:20
22.	"避けえぬ対決 (Part2)"	3:41
23.	"特訓！熱湯しゃぶしゃぶ"	2:10
24.	"Geisha Harakiri"	0:46
25.	"私を改造してください"	1:05
26.	"脇の下から刀"	1:19
27.	"金属剣士ロボ侍の猛襲"	0:46
28.	"すれ違う想い"	1:10
29.	"ヨシエ・ザ・アサシン"	1:41
30.	"救出の歌" (Demo Yamada)	1:43
31.	"決断の時"	0:29
32.	"秘密指令X17号"	0:44
33.	"Clock Work Geisha"	2:04
34.	"死ぬのはお前だ!～Life and Death～Ver.2"	2:32
35.	"腹腹時計が鳴る時"	0:41
36.	"菊奴"	1:24
37.	"ヨシエ"	0:44
38.	"家族奪還大作戦"	1:13
39.	"Geisha Transform"	0:35
40.	"爆走!!ロボ戦車"	1:01
41.	"偽りの謝罪"	1:14
42.	"弱者は権力の肥となれ!"	0:51
43.	"城型ロボット大破壊"	3:48
44.	"激闘!! 尻刀 VS 尻刀"	2:56
45.	"キヌ死す"	1:36
46.	"ヒカル～姉妹激突"	4:33
47.	"こころ"	3:11
48.	"戦え 合体ゲイシャ～The Sister Bomber～"	2:43
49.	"それから"	1:24
50.	"「救出の歌」(PV Version)" (Demo Yamada)	1:51
Total length:		71:55
