= Aya Kiguchi =

Japanese gravure idol and actress (born 1985)

- 木口 亜矢
- Born: October 11, 1985 (age 40); Kawasaki, Kanagawa, Japan
- Occupations: Gravure idol, actress, race queen
- Years active: 2000–present
- Agent: Platinum Production
- Height: 1.58 m (5 ft 2 in)
- Children: 1

Aya Kiguchi (Kiguchi Aya (木口 亜矢), born October 11, 1985) is a Japanese gravure idol, actress, and former race queen from Kawasaki, Kanagawa. She is represented by Platinum Production.

Kiguchi debuted in entertainment around 2000 and gained prominence as a gravure idol in the mid-2000s. She is known for her role as Yoshie Kasuga / RoboGeisha in the 2009 cult film RoboGeisha directed by Noboru Iguchi. Her other notable appearances include guest roles in dramas such as My Boss My Hero (2006) and Rookies (2008), as well as films like Love & Loathing & Lulu & Ayano (2010).

In 2015, Kiguchi married professional baseball player Yūki Tsutsumi, with whom she has one child. They divorced in 2020.

== Filmography ==
=== Films ===
Year	Title	Role	Notes
2007	Fujoshi Rumi	Yoko Matsui	
2007	Negative Happy Chainsaw Edge		
2008	Kakutou-bin	Kazabana Sudo	
2008	Sundome		
2009	RoboGeisha	Yoshie Kasuga / RoboGeisha	Lead role
2010	Love & Loathing & Lulu & Ayano	Rie Aoki	
2012	Futari Ecchi		

=== Television dramas ===
Selected appearances:

Year	Title	Role	Network	Notes
2006	My Boss My Hero	Hostess	NTV	Episode 5
2007	Boys Esté	Sakura Takanashi	TV Tokyo	
2008	Rookies		TBS	
2009	Jōō	Juri Aoyama	TV Tokyo	
2013	Tank Top Fighter	Mami Takahashi	MBS	Episodes 1–2
