= Bomberman GB 3 =

- Developer: Hudson Soft
- Publisher: Hudson Soft
- Series: Bomberman
- Platform: Game Boy
- Release: JP: December 2, 1996
- Genres: Action, maze
- Mode: Single-player

Bomberman GB 3 (Note: Japanese: ボンバーマンGB3, Hepburn: Bonbāman Gēmu Bōi Tsūri) is the third and last game in the Bomberman GB series, developed and published by Hudson Soft. The game was released only in Japan on December 20, 1996.

== Gameplay ==
Bomber Nebula's 11th planet, Owen, faces a sudden earthquake. Deep underground, the terrible Evil Bomber has been trapped for ages. He eventually breaks free and steals the Bomber Capsules, the energy that Bomberman relies on. Now he must take back the Capsules and defeat Evil Bomber.

The game's main objective is to defeat the enemies with bombs and unlock the exit to proceed to the next area. Each stage is divided into six areas, the last being a boss battle. The fifth area of each stage is to get crystals; if the player collects enough, a 1UP will be awarded along with two Bell Items that will spawn near the exit. These items will offer help to the player against the boss. A White Bomber will appear to drop items and a Black Bomber will appear to damage one HP to the boss.

After defeating a boss, they leave behind Bomber Capsules which can be used in Cutie Bomber's shop. There are 8 abilities to purchase, 4 of which are motorcycles. After purchasing one, the player can select them before each level, each granting additional HP and other abilities.

== Development and release ==
Bomberman GB 3 was released in Japan on December 2, 1996. It was re-released on Nintendo 3DS's Virtual Console on July 11, 2012.
