= List of Nintama Rantarō video games =

Cover art of Nintama Rantarō 64 Game Gallery

This is a list of Nintama Rantarō video games, which were published exclusively in Japan. Most of them were developed and published by Culture Brain.

== Game Boy ==
- Nintama Rantarō GB - December 27, 1995 - Culture Brain
- Puzzle Nintama Rantarō GB - November 1, 1996 - Culture Brain
- Nintama Rantarō GB: Eawase Challenge Puzzle - June 19, 1998 - Culture Brain

== Game Boy Color ==
- Nintama Rantarō: Ninjutsu Gakuen ni Nyuugaku Shiyou no Dan - March 23, 2001 - developed by Polygon Magic and published by ASK

== Nintendo 64 ==
- Nintama Rantarō 64 Game Gallery - April 21, 2000 - Culture Brain

== Nintendo DS ==
- Nintama Rantarō: Nintama no Tame no Ninjutsu Training - March 26, 2009 - Russel
- Nintama Rantarō: Gakunen Taikousen Puzzle! no Dan - September 2, 2010 - Russel

== PC (Windows/Mac) ==
- Nintama Game Land - September 12, 1997 - ASCII Something Good

== Playdia ==
- Nintama Rantarō: Gungun no Biru Chinou-Hen - April 22, 1996 - Bandai
- Nintama Rantarō: Hajimete Oberu Chishiki-Hen - May 15, 1996 - Bandai

== Sega Pico ==
- Nintama Rantarō

== Super Famicom ==
- Nintama Rantarō - July 28, 1995 - Culture Brain
- Nintama Rantarō 2 - March 29, 1996 - Culture Brain
  - BS Nintama Rantarō 2 - 1996 - Culture Brain
- Puzzle Nintama Rantarō - June 28, 1996 - Culture Brain
- Nintama Rantarō Special - August 9, 1996 - Culture Brain
- Nintama Rantarō 3 - February 28, 1997 - Culture Brain
