= Bomberman GB 2 =

- Developer: Hudson Soft
- Publishers: JP: Hudson Soft; NA: Nintendo; EU: Virgin Interactive Entertainment
- Series: Bomberman
- Platform: Game Boy
- Release: JP: August 10, 1995; NA: April 10, 1998; EU: May 15, 1998
- Genres: Action, maze
- Mode: Single-player

Bomberman GB 2 (Note: Japanese: ボンバーマンGB2, Hepburn: Bonbāman Gēmu Bōi Tsū) is the second game in the Bomberman GB series, developed and published by Hudson Soft in Japan, published by Nintendo in North America and by Virgin Interactive Entertainment in Europe.

== Gameplay ==
A Bomberman named Indy Bomber sets out on a long journey to uncover a legendary treasure called the Ring of Wishes. He discovers a scripture and begins to read it, but soon falls into a trap in the floor and ends up in a cave. Now he must find his way out of the cave and find the Ring of Wishes.

The main objective of the game is to defeat the enemies that lurk in the cave and find the exit when done. There are two modes that can be selected before each new stage; Mode A, which requires the player to simply destroy all the enemies, and Mode B, which requires the player to defeat the enemies in a certain order. When an area is cleared, the player earns a new ability to help them in later levels.

== Development and release ==
The game was released in Japan on August 10, 1995. It was released later in North America in April 1998 and Europe also in 1998 as Bomberman GB due to the previous game being released under the title Wario Blast: Featuring Bomberman! in both regions.

The game supports up to four players through use of the Game Link Cable and Super Multitap if used on a Super Game Boy.
