= Wario Blast: Featuring Bomberman! =

- Japanese box art
- Developer: Hudson Soft
- Publishers: JP: Hudson Soft; NA/EU: Nintendo
- Director: Norio Ohkubo
- Producer: Norihito Miyamoto
- Designers: Norio Ohkubo; Katsuhiko Urabe; Hiroji Kiyotake; Yoshimitsu Chokki
- Programmer: Kenji Ogata
- Artist: Shoji Mizuno
- Composer: Yasuhiko Fukuda
- Series: Bomberman; Wario
- Platform: Game Boy
- Release: JP: August 10, 1994; NA: November 1994; EU: June 29, 1995
- Genres: Action, maze
- Mode: Single-player

Wario Blast: Featuring Bomberman! is a video game developed and published by Hudson Soft in Japan, and published by Nintendo in North America and Europe. It was released on August 10, 1994 in Japan and later in November 1994 in North America, and on June 29, 1995 in Europe. It was released in Japan as Bomberman GB (Note: Japanese: ボンバーマンGB, Hepburn: Bonbāman Gēmu Bōi).

== Gameplay ==
In Bomberman GB, White Bomberman is out riding on his motorcycle, when he is suddenly ambushed by Black Bomberman and his gang, who rough him up and steal all of his power-up items. Now White Bomberman must chase them down to get them back.

In Wario Blast: Featuring Bomberman!, Wario one day stumbles upon Bomberman's world, and, being the greedy sort he is, decides to loot it for his own gain. Bomberman is the only one that stands between Wario and the complete decimation of his world.

Every stage is viewed from an overhead perspective. The objective of the game is to blow up enemies to move on to the next stage. Gray walls can be blown up as well. Certain gray walls contain power-ups (which increase the power of explosions, or the number of bombs that can be set) and locate enemies. In Wario Blast, the player can play as either Wario or Bomberman, but this only changes the enemies from Black Bombermen to Wario clones, and back.

The game was enhanced for play on the Super NES through the Super Game Boy. The enhanced game offered color graphics, custom explosion sounds, a multiplayer mode which allowed for simultaneous gameplay between up to four opponents, and in Wario Blast a special Wario & Bomberman frame around the TV screen. The game uses a password system to save progress, where the passwords for Wario are the same as for Bomberman, but written backwards.

== Reception ==
GamePro criticized the game's graphics and difficult controls, but judged the game overall enjoyable due to its classic Bomberman elements, summarizing that "A legendary concept gets a great Nintendo treatment." Nintendo Power commented that the game was "great multi-player action." with "good use of Super Game Boy colors and music." and that the game had "larger areas than in previous Bomberman games." The reviews commented on the graphics stating it was "difficult to recognize your character" and that more characters would have helped.

Games World magazine gave the game an 86% score. Dave Perry said they "love Bomberman in this office" and the Game Boy port "is the perfect portable interpretation of" the game.

== Other releases ==
Bomberman GB is a sub-series of video games in Hudson Soft's Bomberman series released for the Game Boy. The first entry was Bomberman GB, released as Wario Blast: Featuring Bomberman! in North America and Europe, later succeeded by Bomberman GB 2, under the name Bomberman GB internationally, and Bomberman GB 3, which was only released in Japan.

Bomberman Collection is a Game Boy compilation cartridge developed and published by Hudson Soft and released on July 21, 1996 only in Japan. The game includes Bomber Boy, Bomberman GB, and Bomberman GB 2.

Bomberman Selection is a compilation released for the Game Boy Color on April 30, 2003 only in Korea, developed by Hudson Soft and published by Jupiter. It includes Bomber Boy and Bomberman GB, but does not offer compatibility with the Super Game Boy.
