= Animaniacs (video game) =

1994 video game

- North American SNES cover art with the Warner Siblings: Yakko, Wakko, and Dot
- Developers: Konami; Factor 5 (Game Boy)
- Publisher: Konami
- Designer: Hirotaka Fukuda (SNES)
- Composers: Tomoya Tomita (SNES); Rudolf Stember (Game Boy); Kiyoshi Murai (Genesis)
- Platforms: Genesis, Super NES, Game Boy
- Release: Genesis/Mega Drive: NA: November 1994; EU: December 1994; SNES: NA: November 1994; EU: December 1994; JP: March 7, 1997; Game Boy: NA: July 1995; EU/JP: 1995
- Genre: Platform
- Mode: Single-player

In 1994, Konami developed and published two different platform games of the same name, Animaniacs (Note: Japanese: アニマニアクス, Hepburn: Animaniakusu), based on the cartoon series of the same name: one for the Super Nintendo Entertainment System (SNES), and another for the Sega Mega Drive/Genesis. The latter was ported to the Game Boy by Factor 5 in 1995. The Game Boy version has a unique soundtrack if played on the Super Game Boy accessory, and is one of the few games to take full advantage of the accessory.

== Plot ==
In the Genesis version, the Warner Siblings, Yakko, Wakko, and Dot, decide to open up a hip-pop culture shop in order to become closer to their favorite movie stars. To this end, they travel across various movie sets in the Warner Bros. studio lot in order to retrieve movie memorabilia to sell. However, once they collect all the memorabilia, Pinky and the Brain attempt to steal them in order to further their world domination plans.

In the SNES version, the Brain once again has another plan to conquer the world by deciding to steal the script of the new Warner Bros. film while it was under development. The CEO of Warner Bros. studio reluctantly asks the Warner Siblings for their assistance to retrieve all 24 pages of the script and foil the Brain's plan, which is the primary objective of the game. The ending of the game depends on how many script pages are collected, with the best ending leading to Warner Bros. being able to complete the film, pleasing the CEO, only to find out that the film was about the Warner Siblings, which pleases them.

== Gameplay ==
=== Sega Genesis/Game Boy version ===
The game features four main levels, which can be entered in any order. The player must reach the end of each level and beat the boss to obtain a piece of movie memorabilia. A fifth level will then open to obtain a final piece of movie memorabilia. After clearing all five levels, players travel to the final level where they must fight Pinky and the Brain. Players control Yakko, Wakko, and Dot, switching control between them to use their respective powers accordingly. Yakko uses a paddleball to stun enemies and is also able to push and pull objects such as crates. Wakko uses a mallet that can be used to hit switches, break certain objects, and light fuses. Dot is able to blow kisses which, when used on certain characters, triggers certain actions needed to progress.

The Warner Brothers and Sister have health indicators and a number of lives. The lives can be increased by obtaining either 100 stars or obtaining a small golden form of their faces. Their health is indicated by their faces on the top left of the screen. When they smile, they are healthy, but when they are looking either tired, unhappy, or weak, then they should find health soon (which is found in the forms of several forms of ice cream or sweets, or other kinds of food). The levels are timed.

This version was ported to the Game Boy by Factor 5, but due to space constraints, only three levels are present in this version and certain parts of the three levels are absent. Both the Science Fiction/Space Opera – Space Wars (Space Trucking) and nearly all of the final Action Movie – Once There Was A Man Named Oscar levels are absent from this version. On easy mode, the Game Boy version ends early, on the first three levels. On normal and hard modes, the Game Boy version continues after the player completes the first three levels, goes to Once There Was A Man Named Oscar, and battles Pinky and the Brain.

=== SNES version ===
Players navigate the three characters through a linear, three-dimensional playing field. The primary objective of the game is to collect 24 pages of a script, with multiple pages being scattered around different areas of the studio, though the game can be completed without obtaining all of them. Scripts are hidden in stages, with them being placed in hard-to-reach areas and several hidden ones which are revealed by performing certain actions such as moving objects or interacting with characters. The ending of the game, with three endings in total, alternates depending on how many scripts are collected. The game focuses more on parodies of films at the different stages, that are once more based on different genres of movies. Several stages feature boss sections, which must be defeated by harming them with certain objects. The final stage, the Editing Room, is unlocked after completing all the other stages, in which the player must defeat all the bosses previously fought in the form of a boss rush, following by a final battle with Pinky and the Brain.

The characters have no health bar, lives (the game ends when all the characters are defeated/captured, one by one), or special abilities. Characters can be swapped freely in almost all places. Characters are defeated from touching harmful enemies or objects, or being captured by the security guard, Ralph. Defeated/captured characters can be recovered by completing a "Rescue" stage that appears when one or two characters are defeated or captured. Characters can pick up and throw things as well as execute a dash move. If all three are together, they can also stack themselves up to reach higher platforms. The stack move can be performed with two characters, however, the power of the stack is weakened. A slot machine at the bottom of the screen is activated after obtaining a certain number of coins and can be used for a range of power-ups, such as temporary invincibility, bringing back characters who were defeated or captured earlier, and giving or taking away extra coins.

Throughout the game, there are small robots with white blockheads, red bodies, and yellow appendages who work for Pinky and the Brain.

== Reception ==
Reception

Aggregate score
Aggregator	Score
GameRankings	71.25% (Genesis); 62.15% (SNES); 62% (GB)

Reviewing the Genesis version, GamePro assessed that the game successfully appeals to the TV show's preadolescent target audience. They criticized the limited music and absence of voices, but praised the cartoony and detailed graphics and the way the level design requires the player to make regular use of all three characters. They gave the Super NES version a negative review, citing overly simplistic and frustrating gameplay, though they did praise the graphics for their large and colorful sprites and background references to the TV show. Reviewing the Game Boy version, they criticized the slow-moving characters and trial-and-error gameplay, but approved of the graphics and audio and concluded, "The humor and spirit of the Animaniacs lives on in this handheld game."

Super Play was more negative on the SNES version, giving it only 28%.

Digital Press gave the Genesis version 8 out of 10.

Next Generation reviewed the Genesis version of the game, rating it three stars out of five, and stated that "Cutting edge innovation isn't here, but what is here is plenty of fun."

In 1995, Total! ranked Animaniacs 94th on their Top 100 SNES Games calling the game ingenious and funny.
