= Radar Mission =

1990 video game

- North American box art
- Developers: Nintendo R&D1; Pax Softnica
- Publisher: Nintendo
- Designer: Gunpei Yokoi
- Platform: Game Boy
- Release: JP: October 23, 1990; NA: February 1991; EU: 1991
- Genre: Turn-based strategy
- Mode: Single-player

Radar Mission (Note: Japanese: レーダーミッション, Hepburn: Rēdā Misshon) is a turn-based strategy video game developed and published by Nintendo for the Game Boy. It was released in 1990 in Japan and North America and Europe in 1991. In June 2011, the game was re-released on the Nintendo 3DS' Virtual Console.

== Gameplay ==
Radar Mission has two different modes for one or two players. There are additional options for both modes to further customize the gameplay setup.

=== Game-A ===
This mode is very similar to the pencil and paper game, Battleship, but there is a storyline to it. The storyline follows the player destroying the enemy's fleet on the first two levels and then proceeding to the enemy's headquarters on the third level. On the third level, the enemy's vessels are replaced with a large runway and tanks.

There are also additional features that could be toggled to affect gameplay. First is the "Near Miss". If this feature is enabled, a shot directly next to a target ship will display a larger splash and play a beeping noise. Next, there are "Lucky Shots" which are randomly placed in empty grid squares. The Lucky Shots are split into two types; Black and White. A Black Lucky Shot will launch one missile, but if that missile hit a target ship, then it will instantly destroy that ship and any other ship touching it. A White Lucky Shot launches a salvo of either five or nine missiles depending on the original grid size. There is a hindrance in this Lucky Shot, however, because only hits and misses are displayed on the player's radar. If any of the salvo are Near Misses, then the player has to work out where the near misses are. Lastly, there is also an option which allows non-sunk aircraft carriers to launch an airplane mid-game. The airplane is only one square big, but moves around the aircraft carrier between turns.

=== Game-B ===
This mode allows the player to set up his submarine with extra Prop Speed, shoot Twin Shots, and/or equip a Power Sonar, before battling against other ships. The player moves left or right slowly when above the ocean, while he moves faster when submerged. Players use the radar to locate their enemies and allies only when submerged. They can use the B-button to attack the enemy's submarine with a machine gun, while the player uses the A-button to send out torpedoes at all ships. When the player destroys every ship but the enemy's submarine or just destroys the enemy's submarine itself, the player wins the game. The enemy's submarine isn't the only one that can attack and destroy the player in this mode, but also fighter jets take off from aircraft carriers, while dropping torpedoes at the player. Different animated endings pop up, depending on how much the player actually scores in the game.

== Reception ==
Famitsu gave the game a 25/40 score. Lucas M. Thomas of IGN gave the game a 6.5/10 score, comparing it favorably to Nintendo's Steel Diver for the Nintendo 3DS for its similar but more strategic style of gameplay. Jacob Crites of Nintendo Life gave the game a 6/10 score, praising its presentation and soundtrack but criticized its bland single-player mode.
