= Super Game Boy =

Accessory for the Super Nintendo Entertainment System

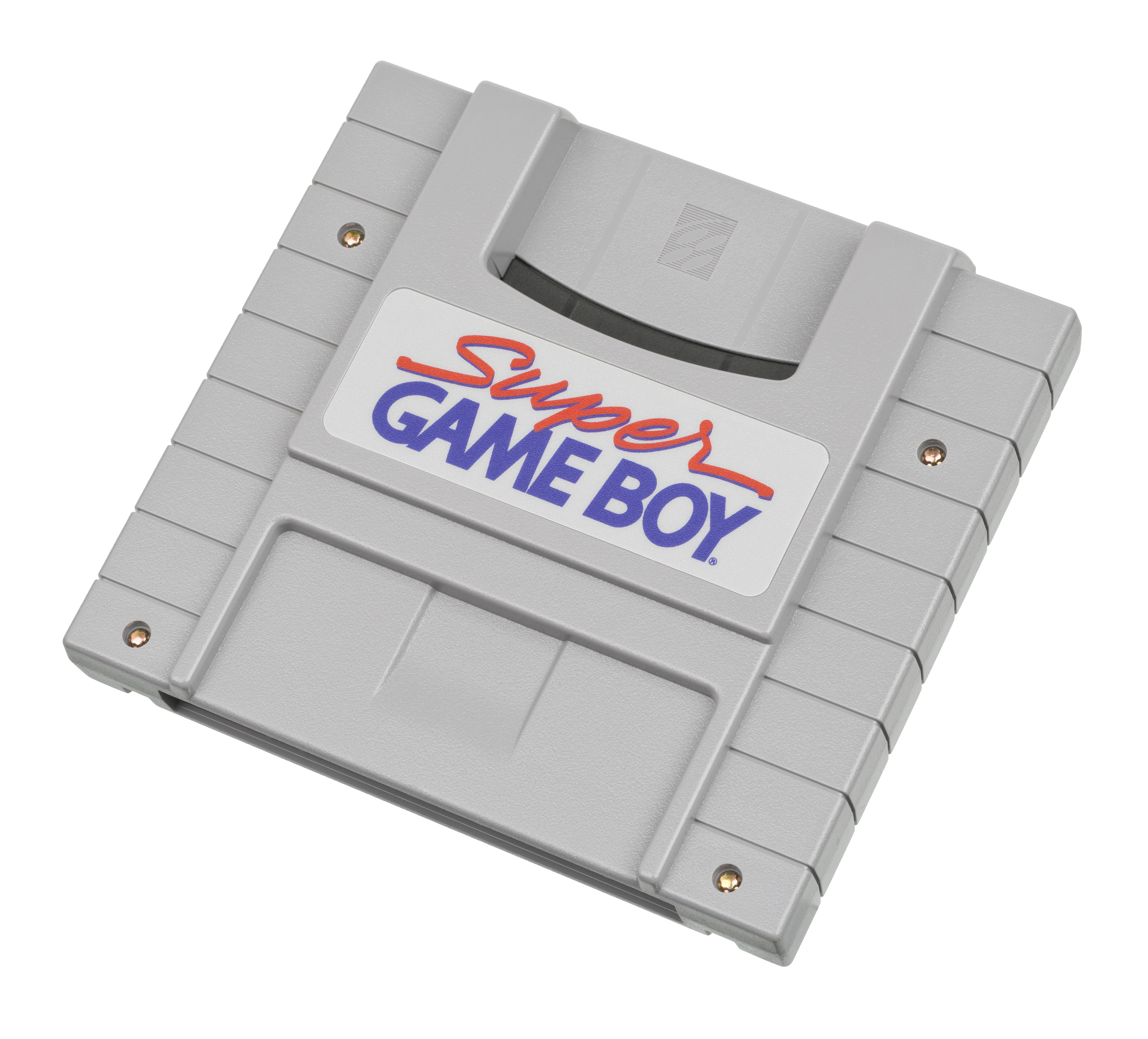
- North American version cartridge
- Developer: Nintendo
- Manufacturer: Hori; Nintendo
- Type: Adapter cartridge
- Generation: Fourth
- Released: Super Game Boy: JP: June 14, 1994; NA: June 1994; EU: September 24, 1994; Super Game Boy 2: JP: January 30, 1998
- Discontinued: Super Game Boy: WW: 1998
- Media: Game Boy Game Pak
- Platform: Super NES
- Successor: Game Boy Player
- Related: Game Boy, Super NES

The Super Game Boy (Note: Japanese: スーパーゲームボーイ, Hepburn: Sūpā Gēmu Bōi) is a peripheral that allows Game Boy cartridges to be played on a Super Nintendo Entertainment System console. Released June 1994 in Japan and North America, and in September 1994 in Europe, it retailed for US$59.99 (equivalent to $130.31 in 2025) in the United States and £49.99 (equivalent to £105.48 in 2025) in the United Kingdom. In South Korea, it is called the Super Mini Comboy (Note: 슈퍼 컴보이 Syupeo Minikeomboi) and was distributed by Hyundai Electronics. A revised model, the Super Game Boy 2 (Note: スーパーゲームボーイ2, Sūpā Gēmu Bōi Tsū), was released in Japan in January 1998.

== Functionality ==
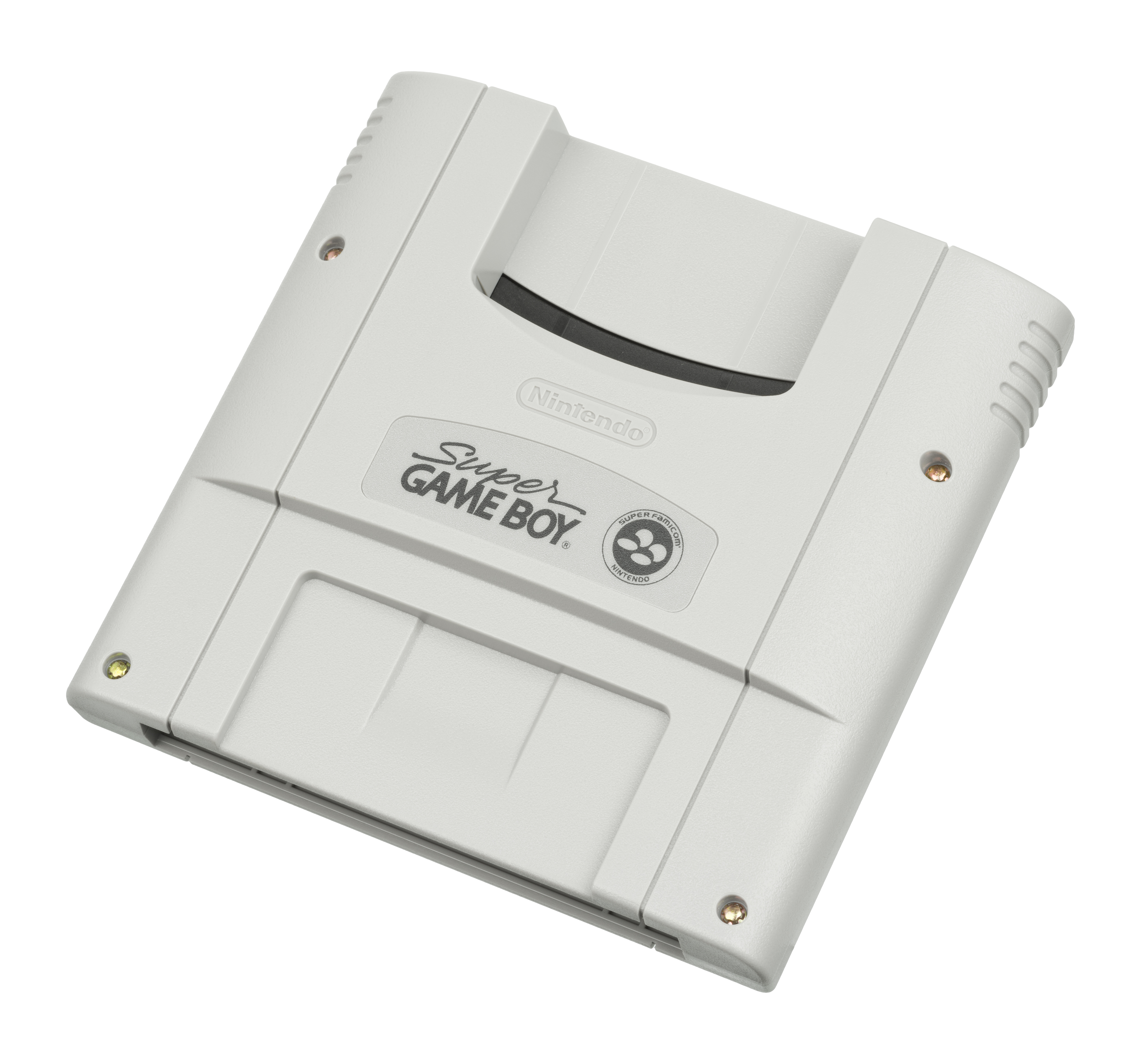
The Super Game Boy cartridge, Super Famicom version

The Super Game Boy is compatible with the same cartridges as the original Game Boy: original Game Boy cartridges, the Game Boy Camera, and dual-mode Game Boy Color cartridges (in Game Boy-mode). The unit could map the four shades of green to various colors on the screen. Later Game Boy games that were optimized to use the Super Game Boy had additional color information and could override the on-screen colors, display a graphical border around the screen, and display special background sprites, as seen in the Mario's Picross title screen. Those games would have printed a small "Super Game Boy Game Pak" logo on the box and cartridge. The adaptor could support up to 64 colors for the border, and 12 colors for the screen. Static screens could display all 10 colors. Certain games can load multiple borders depending on the player's location in the game, such as Dragon Warrior I & II.

It is also possible for Super Game Boy games to make use of the Super NES hardware for extra effects, as demonstrated in Contra: The Alien Wars, Donkey Kong, Kirby's Dream Land 2, A Bug's Life, FIFA 98: Road to World Cup, Madden '97, Animaniacs and Toy Story; these games had expanded sound when used with the Super Game Boy. Wario Blast, the Game Boy version of Primal Rage, the Game Boy version of Killer Instinct and several other titles even allowed the second Super NES controller to be used for two-player action. The title screen changed to show that these games had a two-player option, rather than a connection status. Using the Super Multitap, some games even supported four players. The original Super Game Boy does not support game link multiplayer because, according to a Nintendo spokesman, a two-player configuration would interfere with the RF signal from the television.

The Game Boy version of Space Invaders allowed players to access Space Invaders DX (a Super NES version of the game) as well as a colored version of the Game Boy game. Space Invaders DX is copied into and run from the console's internal 256 KB work RAM.

Some black Game Boy Color cartridge games also have Super Game Boy enhancements, although there is not any logo indicating this on the cartridge or on the front of the box as there are for original Game Boy releases. Several Game Boy Color titles do have a small Super Game Boy compatibility icon located on the back of their packaging, such as for 2001's Dragon Warrior Monsters 2: Cobi's Journey & Tara's Adventure. The final commercially released black cartridge Game Boy Color game, the Japan-exclusive From TV Animation One Piece: Maboroshi no Grand Line Boukenki! from June 2002, has a custom Super Game Boy border.

== Hardware ==
Because the Super NES cannot emulate the Game Boy hardware, the Super Game Boy actually consists of the same hardware as the original handheld; inside the cartridge is a separate CPU that processes the games while the Super NES only provided means for user-input, output of graphics to the screen, and the additional coloring.

The original Super Game Boy is known to play the game program and its audio 2.4% (NTSC) or 1.5% (PAL) faster than other Game Boy hardware. This is due to the use of the Super NES's clock speed divided by 5, which ends up being 4.295 MHz (NTSC) or 4.256 MHz (PAL) instead of 4.194 MHz.

=== Super Game Boy 2 ===
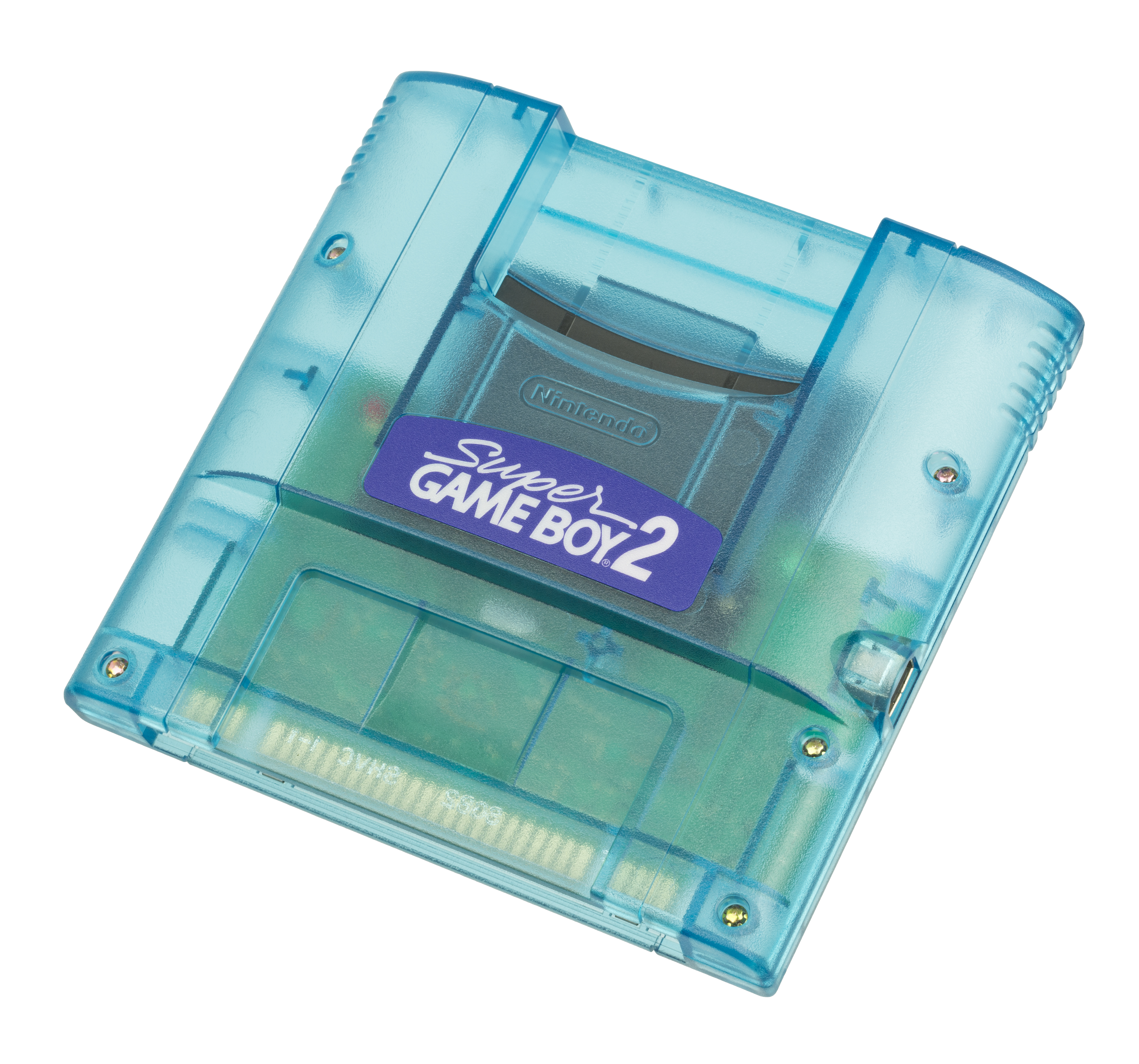
The Super Game Boy 2

The Super Game Boy 2 was released only in Japan in January 1998. Additions included a link port to allow a user to access two-player mode via the link cable, the green game link LED, and the red power LED indicator, and it runs at the exact speed of the Game Boy (the original model runs slightly faster than a Game Boy, see above). In addition, it came with eight new default borders, which replaced those in the original model (though the old borders are still accessible via a code); however, it retained the same built-in palettes and coloring tools as on the original model. Also, this version of the SGB does not allow one to change borders in some games that have built-in borders. Some games have features only available through the Super Game Boy 2, such as a special Tetris DX border.

== System menu ==
The system menu is accessed by pressing the L and R buttons at the same time; the menu has five options to choose from:

- Color Palette: Choose from one of 32 pre-made color palettes, the Super Game Boy enhanced palette(s) (if available), or a user-created palette (if available). A few Super Game Boy games will not allow the palette to be changed. Internally, the Super Game Boy includes special palettes for several games that came out before the release of the Super Game Boy; for example, Alleyway, Yoshi's Cookie, Kirby's Pinball Land, Metroid II: Return of Samus, and Solar Striker have 1 of the 32 default colors by default.
- Border: Choose from one of 9 pre-made borders, the Super Game Boy enhanced border(s) (if available), or a user-created border (if created).
- Button Setting: Switches between two controller mappings. A few Super Game Boy games will not allow the controller setting to be changed.
- Custom Color: Create a custom color palette and get a password to retrieve it later. If palette changes are disabled within the game, this option will also be unavailable.
- Graffiti: Create a custom border by using several painting tools. If plugged into the second controller port, the Super NES Mouse could be used for this feature.

Some games disable the use of changing colors, so the unavailable options are blacked out.

== Predecessors and successors ==
The Super Game Boy is the successor to Intelligent Systems' Wide Boy (which connected to the Famicom or NES). One difference between the Wide Boy and the Super Game Boy is that the former did not use any part of the Famicom/NES other than the video memory. Even the controller (a single Famicom controller) is hardwired directly into the Wide Boy. The Wide Boy would continue running even if the reset button is held down on the Famicom/NES. The Game Boy had twice as many tiles as could fit in the Famicom/NES's video memory, so the Wide Boy had to refresh the Famicom/NES's video memory halfway down the screen.

Camerica had a Game Boy to NES adaptor developed by Biederman Design Labs, which appeared similar to the Super Game Boy.

The Super Game Boy was followed by the Transfer Pak for the Nintendo 64, which allowed one to play the six (seven in Japan) Game Boy and Game Boy Color Pokémon titles in Pokémon Stadium and Pokémon Stadium 2 in a Super Game Boy-like fashion, complete with the Super Game Boy enhanced borders and palettes. The games were played via the use of a software emulator on the Nintendo 64. However, the main role of the Transfer Pak was to transfer data from Game Boy Color to Nintendo 64 games, not to play games.

The Wide-Boy64 was released for the N64 in two major versions, the CGB version which allowed Game Boy and Game Boy Color titles to be played on a television, and the AGB version which also allowed Game Boy Advance games to be played. It cost $1400, and like the original Wide Boy, it was only available to developers and the gaming press. These devices were used to take screenshots of Nintendo handheld video games to be in retail media.

Datel developed a Game Boy player for the Nintendo 64 called the GameBooster, which was licensed and sold in the US by EMS Production Ltd. under the name GB Hunter. It was released for the Nintendo 64 halfway through the console's lifespan. It was not officially licensed by Nintendo; to circumvent the system's lockout technology, the device included a slot at the back for an N64 game with a 6102 CIC. Like the Super Game Boy, it connects to the N64's cartridge slot, and allows the console to play Game Boy games. However, it could not play back the game's sound; instead, the GB Hunter's built-in theme song is looped endlessly during use. There is also a cheating device programmed into it, called the "Golden Finger" (like the Game Shark), along with a trainer option to determine the RAM values that decrement, increment, change, or stay the same. This can provide certain cheat codes to try out in the game. Holding the 'L' and 'R' buttons simultaneously will cause the game to freeze at that point and the GB Hunter Menu to appear. The game screen can be maximized or minimized from this menu, allowing the player to play the game in fullscreen. The color palette can also be changed from the menu, to view the game in a custom variation of the 3 different palettes available to the Game Boy PPU, using RGB values. These palettes correspond to the background and two sprite palettes. There are also 4 preset borders to place around the game, with the added support of SGB borders.

Datel also made a version of the GameBooster for Sony's PlayStation console, which uses the Parallel I/O port on the back of the console, not found on the Series 9000 models of the system or the slimline PSone system. This version has a graphically better theme, lacks the song that is played in the N64 version, has battery save support, and has a built-in game titled Rebound Mission, although the palette customizer only has one palette as opposed to three. However, it has a built-in music CD player which can be used to mimick the original Game Boy game audio. The GameBooster was also rebranded as the PowerFlash, though many differences are unknown other than the name change.

On the GameCube, the Game Boy Player was released in 2003, which could play Game Boy, Game Boy Color, and Game Boy Advance games. It allowed these games to be played on a full television screen. The GBP attaches to the bottom of the console and a boot disc must be running in the GameCube disc drive in order to boot it, although the disc can be removed afterwards. The Game Boy Player functions just like a Game Boy Advance, letterboxing the games' display on a standard television set. Some GBA games were programmed with consideration for the Player, including activating the vibration feature in GameCube controllers and special color palettes which accounted for a TV's brightness and resolution. However, the Game Boy Player will not activate Super Game Boy options on a Super Game Boy enhanced cartridge. Also, when playing a Game Boy or Game Boy Color game on the Game Boy Player, a black border will appear between the main border and the gameplay area; this is a carry-over from the Game Boy Advance.

== Peripherals ==
Hori's SGB Commander controller

In Japan, Hori released a special Super Game Boy controller called the SGB Commander. The controller, aside from the 4 Game Boy buttons (A, B, Start and Select), also has 4 Super Game Boy specific buttons which can enable the user to mute the sound, reduce the speed of the game, change the colors and modify the display window. An additional switch is provided to alternate between Super Game Boy mode and regular Super Famicom Mode.

== Guide ==
In 1994, shortly after the Super Game Boy release, Nintendo sent the Nintendo Power magazine subscribers the "Super Game Boy Player's Guide", a 72-page instruction book / guide to using the features of the Super Game Boy. The first 15 pages were instructional, followed by 55 pages of very brief overview style walkthrough of several games. These walkthroughs highlighted various points of the games and often pointed out color schemes to set that area's intended mood. Games included Super Mario Land, Super Mario Land 2: 6 Golden Coins, Wario Land: Super Mario Land 3, the newly released Donkey Kong (which had a special "Super Game Boy" border and color palette), Metroid II: Return of Samus, The Legend of Zelda: Link's Awakening, Kirby's Dream Land, Kirby's Pinball Land, Tennis, Nintendo World Cup, Alleyway, Dr. Mario, and Yoshi.

== See also ==
- Game Boy Player
- Transfer Pak
- List of Super Game Boy games — a list of Game Boy and Game Boy Color games which make use of the enhancements the Super Game Boy has to offer
