= Yasuhiko Fukuda =

Yasuhiko Fukuda 福田 裕彦
- Also known as: Hirohiko Fukuda
- Born: May 3, 1957 (age 68); Itabashi, Tokyo, Japan
- Occupations: Composer, keyboardist
- Instruments: Keyboard, synthesizer
- Labels: Hudson Soft

Yasuhiko Fukuda (福田 裕彦, Fukuda Yasuhiko; born May 3, 1957) is a Japanese composer and keyboardist.

== History and career ==
Born in Tokyo's Itabashi prefecture, Fukuda began playing piano at the age of 4, and while at school became interested in anime ("We were the first anime generation"). He graduated from Takeheya Senior High School in 1976 and began attending the department of literature at Waseda University in 1978. Around this time, he won a prize for excellence in the Yamaha-sponsored band tournament EAST WEST 78.

Graduating from Waseda in 1980, Fukuda went on to make his professional debut, playing keyboards in the band QUYS. The band was formed alongside bassist Yoshihiro Naruse (currently of Casiopea) and drummer Okai Daiji (ex-member of Yonin Bayashi). The following year marked his recording debut as a session musician on June Yamagishi's 1981 solo album All The Same, along with his major debut with Hideo Saito in the band YOU. In 1982 he was a participating member of Bakufu Slump prior to their debut, and in 1983 played with Minami Kousetsu as a live tour musician.

Following these early exposures to the industry, Fukuda became a frequently employed studio musician - he went from playing for artists such as Kodomo Band, Shogo Hamada, Kozo Murashita, Yoshiyuki Ohzawa to then-contemporary pop figures such as Shibugakitai, Seiko Matsuda and Ryoko Sano. As a studio player, he has participated in the recording of over a thousand songs. Also during this period, he collaborated with fellow synthesist Noritaka Ubukata in the development of a sound patch for the Yamaha DX7 digital synthesizer called "Shofuku", which was released in 1984. Shofuku later became the name of a recording unit featuring the two musicians in 1988. Fukuda also penned books documenting the DX7's programmable synthesis, one of which, "Yamaha DX7 Digital Synthesizer", was translated and sold in the West.

He is perhaps most well known for his video game and anime soundtracks. He has worked for Hudson Soft, and is perhaps best known for his soundtracks to various games from the Bomberman franchise. He is currently the keyboardist in the Japanese jazz-funk and fusion band BeatNuts, and has played in numerous other bands, such as YOU, QUYZ, and Kodomo Band. He is often credited as "Hirohiko Fukuda".

== Works ==
=== Video games ===
Year	Title	Role(s)	Co-worker(s)
1988	Fighting Street	Arranger	Noritaka Ubukata, as "Shofuku" unit
1990	Download	Composer	
1991	Smart Ball	Composer	Manabu Saito and Akira Yamaoka
1992	Tengai Makyō II: Manjimaru	Composer	Joe Hisaishi
1994	Emerald Dragon	Composer	
1994	Super Bomberman 2	Composer	
1994	Wario Blast: Featuring Bomberman!	Composer	
1995	Bomberman GB 2	Composer	
1996	Bomberman GB 3	Composer	
1996	Super Bomberman 4	Arranger	
1997	Super Bomberman 5	Composer	Jun Chikuma
1999	Pop'n Music 2	Composer	
2000	OH NO!	Sound Director, Mix, Sound Composer	
2003	Over the Monochrome Rainbow	Composer, game supervision	

=== Anime ===
Year	Title	Role
1986	They Were Eleven	Composer
1992	K.O. Beast	Composer
1993	Mobile Suit Victory Gundam	Theme song arrangement
1998	Kocchi Muite! Miiko	Composer
2016	Haven't You Heard? I'm Sakamoto	Composer

=== Other ===
Year	Title	Role
1987	"New Season (Long Version)" (1987)	Keyboards
1990	"Chikyu-no Kiki" (1990)	Composition/arrangement
1995	"FUTARI-KOIBITO (Remix)"	Piano
1996	Ultraman Tiga	Ending song arrangement
1996	"Mirage"	Arrangement
2009	RoboGeisha	Composer
2019	The Flowers of Evil	Composer
