= Video games in Finland =

Video gaming in Finland consists of a video game industry which includes 260 active video game developer studios, roughly a dozen professional players and countless enthusiastic amateurs.

== Video game industry ==
The most successful companies include Supercell, Rovio, Bugbear, Remedy Entertainment, Sulake, RedLynx, Frozenbyte and Housemarque. The most important games developed in Finland include Stardust, Alan Wake, Alan Wake 2, Max Payne, Rally Trophy, Angry Birds, Clash of Clans, Clash Royale, Cities: Skylines, Brawl Stars, Control and Ultrakill.

The oldest existing studios were established in 1995. There is a large number of startups among the studios. The industry is concentrated in Helsinki Metropolitan area. During 2011–2014, the Finnish Funding Agency for Technology and Innovation (Tekes) has invested €30 million in the Finnish game industry, mainly through R&D projects. In 2014 the turnover of the industry was approx. €1.8 billion. In 2016, the Finnish gaming industry set a record-high turnover of 2.5 billion euros and decreased to 2.1 billion euros in 2018. Finnish game industry currently employs around 2,500 industry professionals. There are now over 20 educational institutions providing game education at all educational levels.

The revenue of video game industry core (development and game services) in 2014 was 2,400 million euros. This equals 25% of revenue of ICT sector and 20% of added value of culture sector.

Professional players make their living in tournament prizes and sponsoring. Most of them have other sources of income, though.

Many organizations look after game developers’ well-being and legal rights. These include entities such as Neogames, Game Makers of Finland and We in Games Finland.

== Video game consumption ==
Finnish Games and Multimedia Association has published statistics of the most sold games (physically sold games, not including digital purchases). The top ten in 2014 were:

1. NHL 15 (Electronic Arts)
2. FIFA 15 (Electronic Arts)
3. Minecraft (Sony CEE / Microsoft)
4. Call of Duty: Advanced Warfare (Activision-Blizzard)
5. Far Cry 4 (Ubisoft)
6. Watch Dogs (Ubisoft)
7. SingStar Suomibileet (Sony CEE)
8. Grand Theft Auto V (Rockstar Games)
9. The Lego Movie Videogame (Warner)
10. Destiny (Activision-Blizzard)

== History ==
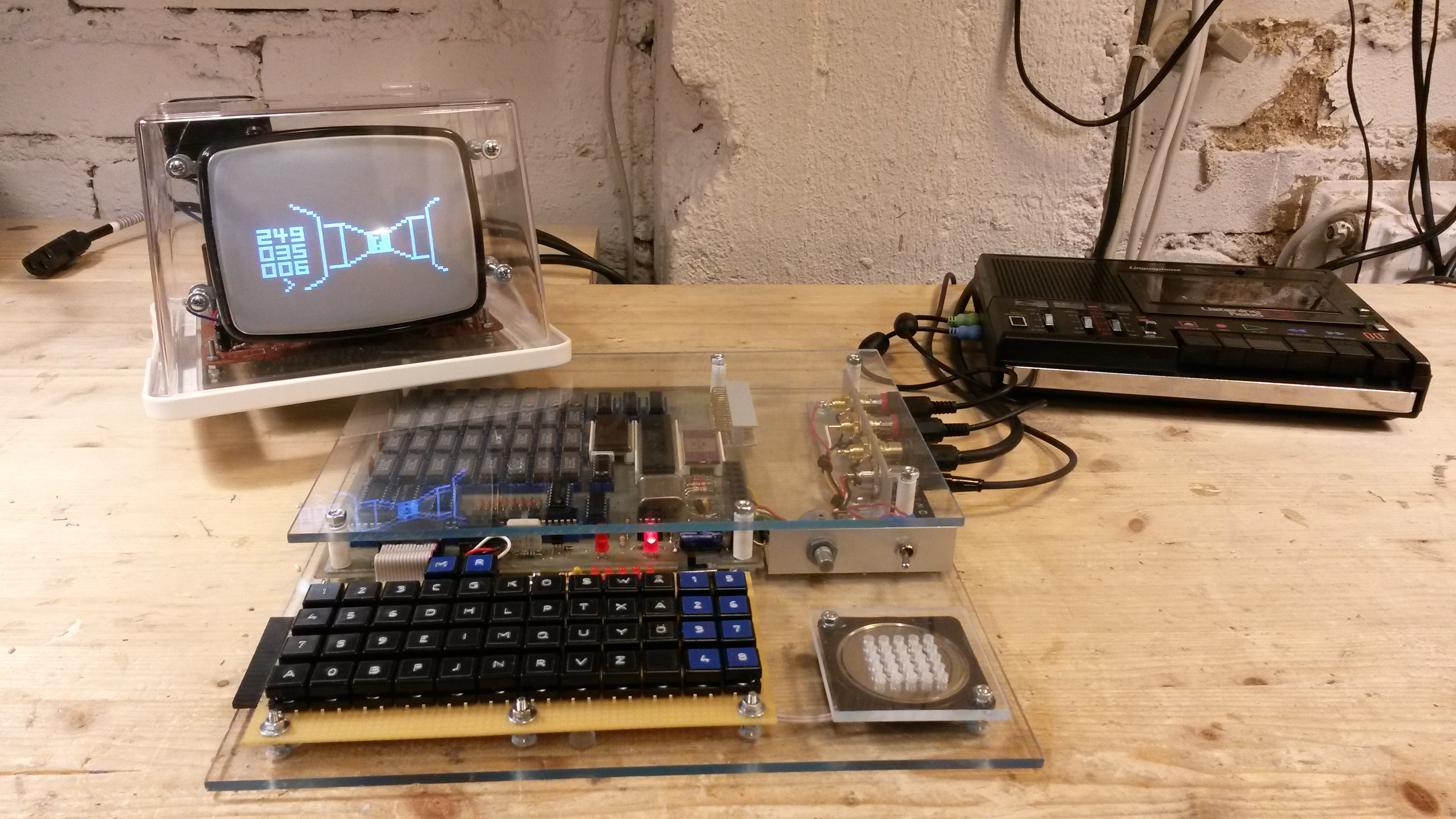
Telmac 1800, microcomputer

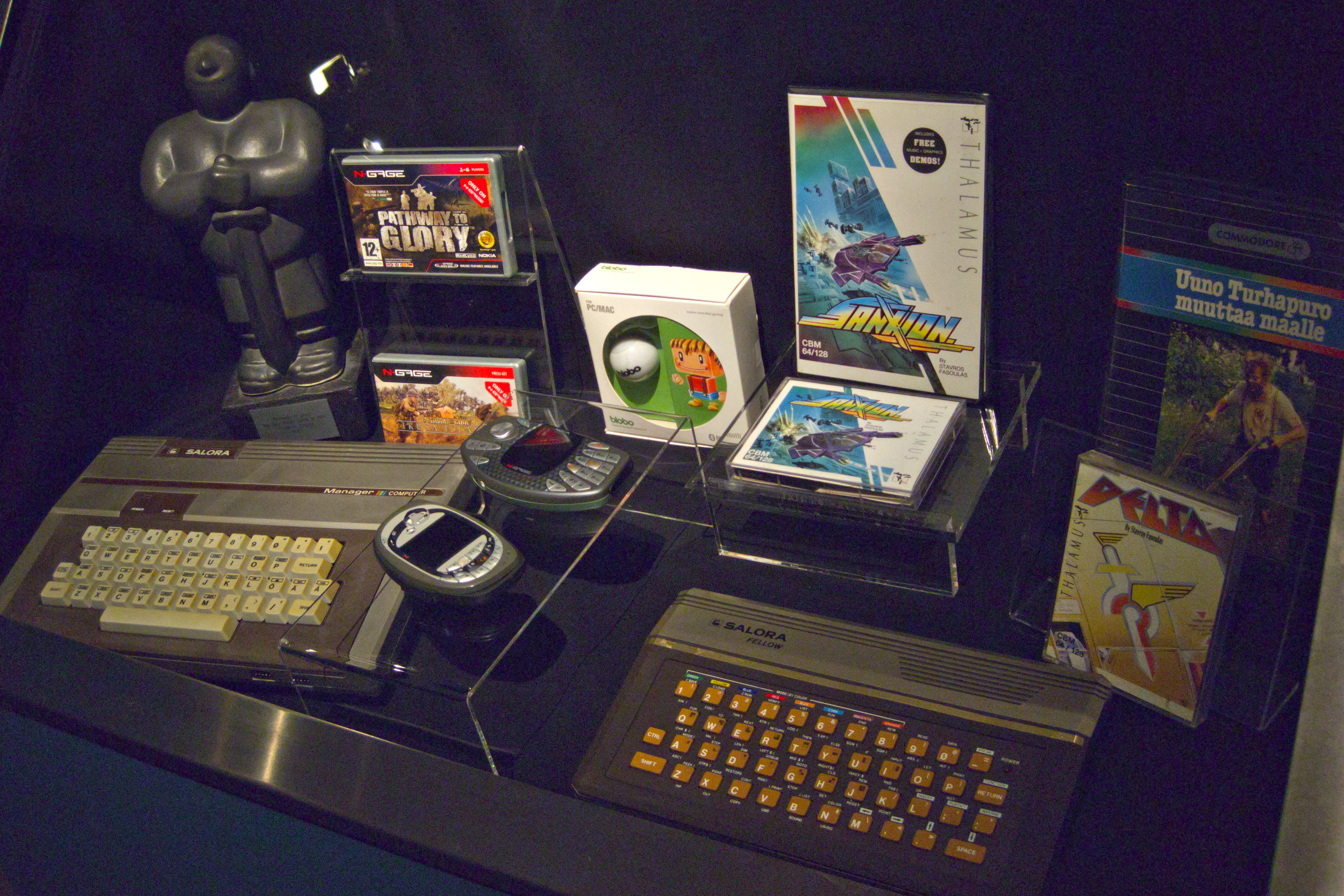
Finnish video games in the Finnish Games Then and Now exhibition in Rupriikki Media Museum. (VTech Laser 200)

The history of the video game industry in Finland began in 1979, when a chess-game for the Telmac was published.

=== 1979–1989: Heroes and amateurs ===
In early 1980s, computer game development in Finland was a pure hobby. Commodore was the most popular home computer. Source codes, usually in BASIC, were distributed on pages of home computing magazines such as MikroBitti. MikroBitti paid an award of 500-1000 FIM for "Program of the month". Nintendo was selling consoles, but Finnish developers were not interested in consoles, partially because the licence fees were too high for amateurs.

The first ever video game made in Finland, a chess-game called Chesmac for the Telmac, had been published in 1979. Larger scale game publishing started in 1984, when AmerSoft (software branch of Amer conglomerate) published four games for Commodore devices: Mehulinja, Myyräjahti, Herkkusuu and Raharuhtimas. The games' user interface was in Finnish, and there were no plans to market them internationally. In addition to AmerSoft, TrioSoft and Teknopiste sold games. In addition to Commodore, games were published for ZX Spectrum, Spectravideo computers and MSX. In 1986, the Finland's first video game based on a film license, Uuno Turhapuro muuttaa maalle, was released for the Commodore 64, selling 2,000 copies overall.

Two developers from the early years were particularly famous: Stavros Fasoulas and Jukka Tapanimäki.

=== 1990–1999: Demoscene and the first game studios ===
In 1990s the more complicated platforms, Amiga and PC, were taking over the status of Commodore. Game development for them needed a team instead of solo hero.

==== Demoscene brings developers together ====
Emerging Demoscene brought developers together. An important event has been the Assembly, organised since 1992. Assembly is the world's largest gathering of demo programmers. The Assembly was a gathering of amateurs, who created short demonstrations to show off their programming skills. Pirates was an important factor in development of the demoscene: people who wanted to get games for free, learned how to break the copy protection. The different cracker groups were competing in this, and to get fame they added their own introduction to the cracked games. The intro development and pirates started gradually to develop their own paths, and the visual quality of the intros became the subject of competition. According to Jussi Laakkonen, the coordinator of the Assembly, an important factor in emerging demoscene were the parents who bought their children home computers, not game consoles, because with a computer you can program your own intros and other demos.

==== First game studios ====
The first Finnish video game enterprises, Terramarque and Bloodhouse, started in 1993. In 1995 they merged to form Housemarque. Both Terramarque and Bloodhouse were video game developers for Amiga, but the new company, Housemarque, targeted the evolving PC game market.

Samuli Syvähuoko started a company called Remedy Entertainment in his parents' garage with people he knew from the demoscene. Their first rally game was a success, they moved to a real office and started to develop a third person shooting game which later got the name Max Payne.

The 1996 top-down racing game for DOS, Fatal Fumes, was the first project of a small Finnish group composed of four people. The team was branded as Mediamond for their subsequent projects.

The Worms-like game on MS-DOS, Liero, was first released by Finnish programmer Joosa Riekkinen in 1998. It is real-time, unlike the old, side-scrolling Worms titles.

==== First steps of mobile phone games ====
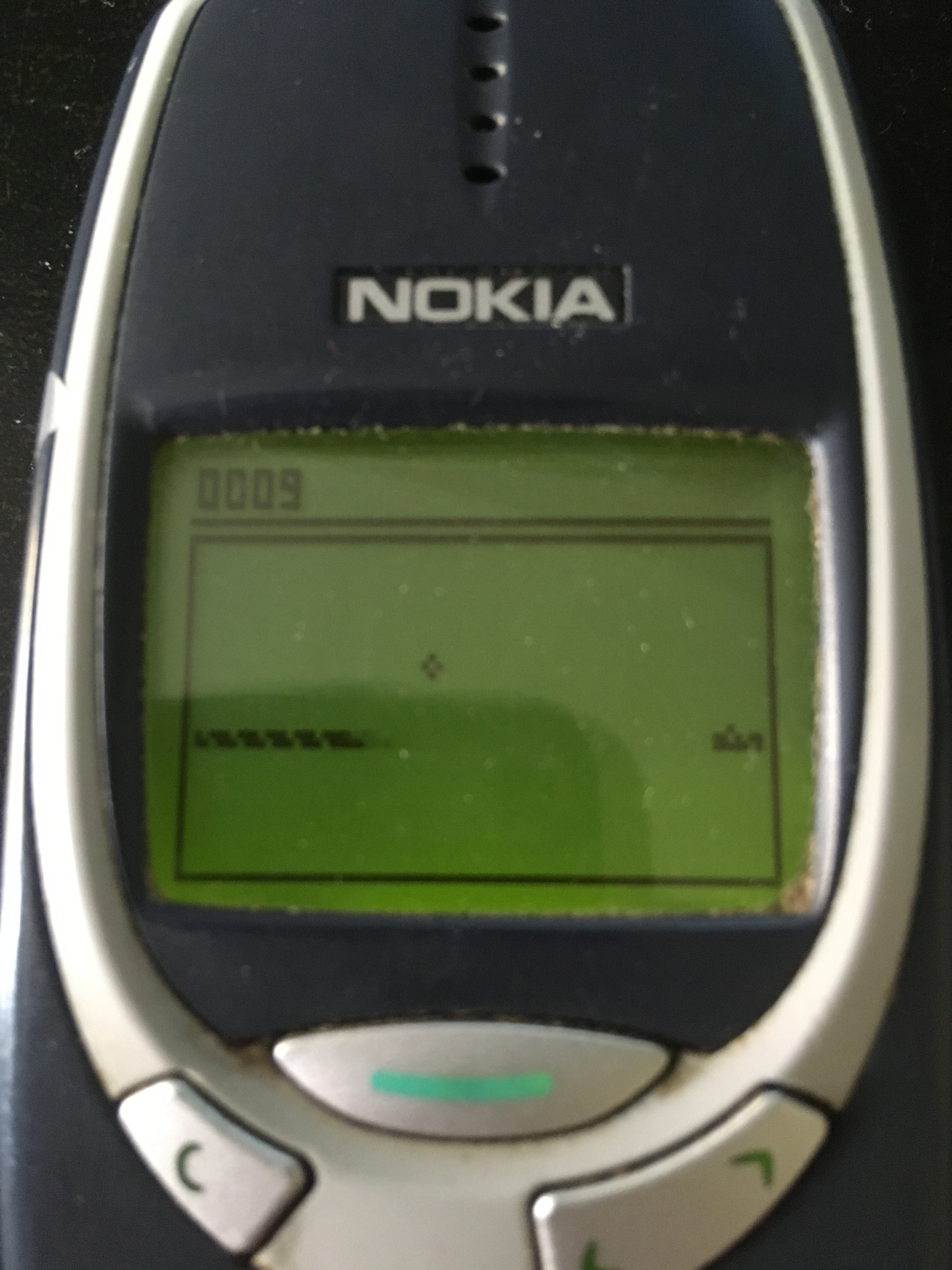
Nokia 3310, playing Snake

A variant of arcade game Snake was preloaded on Nokia mobile phones. Graphics consisted of black squares, and it had 4 directions. It was programmed in 1997 by Taneli Armanto, a design engineer in Nokia and introduced on the Nokia 6110. A few other games were included in the Nokia phones, but Snake was the only success.

=== 2000–2004: Max Payne and mobile game studios ===
==== First mobile game studios ====
When Nokia introduced a primitive mobile web called WAP, some games were developed for that environment. WAP technology was supposed to bring internet to mobile devices, but the usability was poor and data transfer was expensive. Internet enthusiasm brought investor money for mobile game developers. Among the first one were Springtoys, a spring off of Housemarque, and Riot-E. International corporate giants invested 20 million euros in venture capital into Riot-E. Within a few years, Riot-E went bankrupt. The mobile games started to look more attractive, when phones with colour displays and Java became more common. Distribution of the games still needed contracts with individual tele operators who run their own application stores. As there were no big hardware standards, each game had to be modified to several different phone types.

==== Max Payne conquers the world ====
Max Payne was finally released in 2001, and it became the most sold Finnish game of the era During the first 10 years the Max Payne franchise sold over 7.5 million copies.

==== Habbo ====
August 2000 saw the opening of first version of Habbo - a social networking service and online community aimed at teenagers. The service allows users to create their own Habbo character and design hotel rooms, meet new friends, chat with other players, organize parties, look after virtual pets, create and play games and complete quests. Creators of the Habbo Hotel, Sampo Karjalainen and Aapo Kyrölä had earlier made an avatar application for the website of a band called mobile, and a snowballs game for marketing purposes of a tele operator. The first version of the hotel concept was called Hotelli Kultakala (Hotel Goldfish). International versions, now under name Habbo Hotel, started from United Kingdom. As largest, the new virtual world had versions in 11 languages and users from more than a hundred countries. It was free to play Habbo, but revenue was made with micropayment. Users had their own hotel rooms they could furnish with items they could order and pay with SMSes. Later the SMS payment was replaced with digital tokens.

=== 2005–2007: Digital distribution ===
Digital distribution was a revolution in game development. Valve launched Steam in 2003. The Steam platform is considered to be the largest digital distribution platform for PC gaming, and was estimated by Screen Digest to have 75% of the market space in October 2013.

In traditional model, game developer is a subcontractor, and distribution is expensive due to costs of marketing, materials and shipping. Developer gets around 10%. In digital delivery, distribute takes only 30% share of the income. This allows Indie game developers to bring their product to the market.

=== 2008–2011: Apple takes over; Angry Birds is a hit ===
In 2008 revenue of video game industry in Finland was 87 million euros, and it employed more than a thousand people.

Apple launched AppStore in 2008. That was the turning point of success of mobile games. Nokia tried with its own marketplace, but the user interface of their Symbian phones was inferior to Apple's iPhones. Less than 50 games were launched for N-Gage, and each of them was 5-10 euros, while in the AppStore you could buy games for less than a euro.

Rovio entertainment, which had started 2003 as Relude, decided to concentrate on iPhone games only. Their big success was Angry Birds. As of July 2015, the series’ games have been downloaded more than three billion times collectively, making it the most downloaded freemium game series of all time. It has been the most successful iOS app.

Remedy launched Alan Wake, a successor of Max Payne, in 2010. They had a contract with Microsoft, and the game was launched solely for Xbox 360.

=== 2012–: Era of free-to-play and indie games ===
Digital distribution encouraged small startup companies since 2011. During 2001-2014 total of 179 new game studios started, and 1,26 billion euros foreign money was invested in video game industry in Finland, including small studios like Amistech which have gone on to create very popular indie games. After the success of Angry Birds, the Free-to-play games have become the most popular models. In them, the revenue comes from micropayment. Supercell launched three very popular free-to-play games: Hay Day and Clash of Clans in 2012 and Boom Beach in 2014.

Supercell's revenue in 2013 was 672 million euros. Majority of its shares were sold to Japanese SoftBank and GungHo in 2013. When SoftBank increased its stake in the company, valuation of Supercell grew to US$5.5 billion. This puts Supercell to be likely the most valuable mobile game studio in the world.

The revenue of video game industry core (development and game services) in 2014 was 2400 million euros. This equals 25% of revenue of ICT sector and 20% of added value of culture sector.

== Video game development ==
=== Game developers ===
- Bugbear Entertainment
- Colossal Order (company)
- Cosmic Division Oy
- Dinosaurs Are Better (Games & films)
- Domesticated Ant Games Oy
- Dreamloop Games (Also co-dev: games, graphics, audio. Porting.)
- Eldritch Sword Games
- FakeFish Oy (Also FakeFish Ltd.)
- Frozenbyte
- Hanki Games Oy
- Hologram Monster Oy
- Housemarque
- Jesse Makkonen Games (Ex-Winterveil Studios Oy in 2014-2020. Former publisher.)
- Kalla Gameworks
- Karva Games
- Kukouri Mobile Entertainment Oy (Mobile-focused. Former publisher.) (FI wiki)
- Mureena Oy
- Muro Studios Oy (Former publisher)
- One Trick Entertainment
- Iceflake Studios
- Plebeian Studio
- RedLynx (Games. Ex-"Wah-Software" (1997-2002), "Red Lynx Laboratories Ltd." (2000-2004). Former publisher.)
- Remedy Entertainment
- Resistance Games
- Snowhound Games
- Sulake
- Team Tyrant Oy (Former publisher)
- Undertow Games (Former publisher)
- Veitikka Studios

==== Misc games ====
- Simucube (Sim racing gear)
- Surrogate.tv (RC robotics & gaming platform)
- Yousician (Interactive & educational music service)

==== Online games ====
- Cursed Studios Oy
- Heroic Games Oy
- Mainframe Industries (Helsinki HQ. Other studios in Reykjavík and Paris. Setup by former CCP Games, Remedy Entertainment, & Next Games vets.)
- Order Of Meta Oy (HQ)
- Vaki Games

==== Mobile games ====
- Cornfox & Brothers Oy (Aka. Cornfox & Bros.)
- Critical Force Oy
- Everywear Games
- Futureplay Games
- Grand Cru
- Huuuge Games (Ex-Gamelion Studios in 2002 to 2014. Helsinki office.) (Note: Gamelion's founder changed firm's name to Huuuge & set up many offices in pricey cities worldwide.)
- Kopla Games
- Koukoi Games
- Lightneer
- Moido Games
- Motorious Entertainment
- Next Games Oy
- Nitro Games Plc (Former core games dev. Also co-dev.)
- PlayRaven Oy
- Seriously Digital Entertainment
- Small Giant Games
- Snowfall Oy
- Supercell (video game company)
- Ticbits Oy
- Tribeflame Oy
- Two Men and a Dog
- Traplight Games

==== Co-development services ====
- Aniway Oy (Mobile, online, core, VR/AR games, advergames, web)
- Black Smoke Studios Oy (Also publisher & dev)
- Kuuasema (Primarily mobile games)

=== Defunct video game developers ===
- Farmind Ltd (Founded 2005. Defunct 2009.)
- Fragment Production (Founded 2012. Defunct 2016.)
- Futuremark (Founded 1997. Defunct 2018.)
- Ninai Games, Inc. (Ex-Detonium Interactive, Ltd in 1998-1999. Founded 1998. Inactive after 2005. Website down after 2009. Dev & former publisher.) (FI wiki)
- NonStop Games (HQ in Singapore. Founded 2011. Defunct 2016.)
- Secret Exit Ltd (Founded 2006. Inactive after 2019. Ex-Skinflake Games & tAAt in 2000's.)
- Shipyard Games (Founded 2017. Defunct 2024. Mobile game.)
- Universomo (Founded 2002. Defunct 2010.)
- Viima Games Oy (Founded 2012. Defunct 2016. Mobile game.)
- Wargaming Helsinki (Ex-Boomlagoon Ltd. in 2012-2016. Closed 2019. Mobile games.)

== Video game publishers ==
- Bonus Stage Publishing
- Fennonauts Publishing Oy
- Nuclear Maniacs

=== Publisher and developer firms ===
- 10tons Entertainment (Games)
- AcroGames
- Act Normal Games
- Almost Human Games
- Amistech Games (Sims)
- Atom Brain Games
- Boom Corp Oy (Mobile-focused)
- Bugbyte Ltd.
- Channel37 Ltd (Setup by ex-Ubisoft RedLynx & Second Order staff)
- Consumer Softproducts Oy
- Ctrl Alt Ninja Ltd. (Former members of 'Almost Human Games')
- DIRGA Games Oy
- Distant Beacon (Also co-dev: software, web. Ex-Offset Games Ltd. (2019-2021).)
- Dodreams Fairytale Company Oy (Also Dodreams Ltd. Mobile games.)
- Draconus Entertainment Ltd (Setup by former member of Dodekaedron Software.)
- Ebonscale Games
- Enormous Elk (Valtava Hirvi in Finnish)
- Fingersoft (Mobile games)
- Fish Pond Studio
- FRACTiLE Games
- Glitch Hammer Oy
- Gloomsoft Oy
- Hempuli Oy
- Horsefly Games Oy
- HypeHype Inc. (Ex-Frogmind Games in 2012 to 2021. Primarily mobile games.)
- Hyperkani Oy (Mobile-focused)
- Instant Kingdom
- juicy.games
- Kloonigames Oy
- Korppi Games Ltd
- Lapioware
- Loiste Interactive
- Lyra Creative Oy (Ex-Wilhelmsen Studios AS in 2011-2024. Sims.)
- Manmachina
- Mediamond
- Metacore Games Oy (HQ. Mobile games.)
- MiTale Ltd. (Also MiTale Oy. Core games, gamification, AR/VR, edugames, serious games. Also co-dev.)
- Moonmana LLC (Also co-dev)
- Mountain Sheep Games
- Oversteer Studios Oy
- Owlkeep Games
- Panic Art Studios Ltd. (Also Panic Art Studios Oy)
- Pepperbox Studios Oy
- Platonic Partnership Oy
- Random Potion Oy
- RANELA GAMES Oy
- Redbeak Games
- Redhill Games (Online games)
- Riimu Games Oy
- Road to Vostok
- Rovio Entertainment (Primarily mobile games)
- RunByCoffee Oy
- Skydome Entertainment Oy
- Skyward Entertainment Ltd. (Also 'Skyward Entertainment Ab')
- Squrio Games (Also Squrio Oy)
- Strangelet Games
- SUBSYSTEM GAMES INC
- System Erasure (Games)
- Valkeala Software
- Yahaha Games (HQ. Dev office in China; business in S. Korea. Subsidiary firm of Yahaha Studios Oy.)
- YrdVaab

=== Defunct game publishers ===
- 3rd Eye Studios Oy Ltd (Publisher & dev. VR games, co-dev. Founded 2016. Defunct 2024.)
- Action Squad Studios (Publisher & dev. Founded 2015. Officially closed 2023. Informally continuing on 1 title.)
- Amo Oy (Video games distributor in 1999 to 2013.) (Note: Original company name of toys & games importer, "Amo Oy", before merger with subsidiary Agerex Oy was "Lelumyynti Oy". (1962-2002).) (FI wiki)
- Dodekaedron Software Creations, Inc. (Publisher & dev. Founded 1996? Inactive after 2006.)
- Elävät Kirjat Oy (Founded 1993. Defunct 2004.)
- Errorfree (Ex-"Error Free Productions" (1995-2004). Publisher & dev. Founded 1995. Inactive after 2007. Website down in 2011.)
- Facepalm Games (Founded 2011. Inactive 2025. Publisher & dev.)
- Fathammer (Publisher & dev. Founded 2000. Closed after 2006?)
- Imagination Development (Publisher & dev. Started 1995. Inactive 2000.)
- Mr.Goodliving (Publisher & dev. Founded 1999. Defunct 2011.)
- MythPeople (Founded 2003? Inactive after 2013.)
- Nolla Games (Founded 2016. Inactive 2025. Publisher & dev.)
- PLAN 1 Oy (Distributor of games & multimedia software. Founded 1990. Inactive after 2012. Website down late 2013.)
- Second Order Oy (Founded 2015. Inactive after 2020.)

== Popular games ==
- Alan Wake series
- Angry Birds series
- Baba Is You
- Brawl Stars
- Cities: Skylines series
- Clash of Clans series
  - Clash Royale
- Control
- Death Rally (classic)
- FlatOut series
- Legend of Grimrock series
- Max Payne series
- My Summer Car
- Noita
- Rally Trophy
- Road to Vostok
- Shadowgrounds
- Snake (1998 video game)
- Stardust
- The Swapper
- Trials series
- Trine series
- Wreckfest series

== See also ==
- Video game industry
