= Super Bomberman R 2 =

2023 video game

- Developers: Konami; HexaDrive
- Publisher: Konami
- Director: Akihiro Mitsuda
- Producers: Noriaki Okamura; Tatsunori Matsuo
- Series: Bomberman
- Engine: Unity
- Platforms: Nintendo Switch; PlayStation 4 PlayStation 5 Windows; Xbox One; Xbox Series X/S
- Release: September 12, 2023
- Genres: Action, maze
- Modes: Single-player, multiplayer

Super Bomberman R 2 is an action-maze video game developed and published by Konami. The game released worldwide for Nintendo Switch, PlayStation 4, PlayStation 5, Windows, Xbox One, and Xbox Series X/S on September 12, 2023. It is the direct sequel to the 2017 release, Super Bomberman R (2017) and the eighth installment in the Super Bomberman series.

It was released as a celebration of the 40th anniversary of the Bomberman franchise. The game received mixed reviews.

== Gameplay ==
Super Bomberman R 2 is an maze video game where the player uses bombs to take down opponents or destroy obstacles.

All battle modes from the previous entry return, including Standard, Grand Prix, and Battle 64. Standard mode has up to sixteen players compete. Grand Prix mode has players split into two teams to compete with either Basic Bomber or Crystal rules, with the former being gameplay from Standard mode, and the latter having players collect the most crystals to win. Battle 64 is a mode taken from the defunct online multiplayer game Super Bomberman R Online (2020), where up to 64 players compete in a battle royale match to be the last player standing. A new game mode named "Castle" features sixteen players divided into two teams; the defenders consisting of one solo player tasked with defending the castle, and the attackers with up to fifteen players tasked with collecting keys to unlock all of the treasure chests within the stage. The solo player has access to traps, Ellons, and one of three special abilities to prevent the attacking team from collecting treasure chests. The treasure chests are guarded by obstacles such as cannons and conveyer belts to further prevent the attackers from opening them. Once an attacker opens a chest with their collected key, they are removed from the match, with the match ending when either the timer runs out or all treasure chests have been opened.

The Stage Editor allows players to create their own custom battle stages for Castle mode, which can be shared online. Players can battle against opponents through online multiplayer. Grade Match is a ranked mode while Room Match allows the player to create custom, unranked games. There is also Solo-Bomb story mode.

== Plot ==
The Black Moon has been destroying cities and planets across the universe, which the Bomberman Brothers have been tracking, led by the eldest brother White. They all pursue the threat in hopes of preventing the danger it could cause, remembering the attacks from Emperor Buggler. The playable characters retain their personality traits from the first game, with Blue becoming involved in minor investigations and research. Their ship heads towards Planet Fulvita in the Star System Huricana after receiving a strange energy signal. On the planet, Pink, Blue, and Red find mysterious intergalactic blue creatures named Ellons, with Yellow finding a device that spawns more Ellons. These creatures defend the planet from an attack by the Black Moon before joining the Bomberman Brothers on their quest. Upon deafeating Calamity Seed, the group realizes Black Moon has been collecting the gem Ellonite on their previously attacked planets, including Fulvita. Ellonite ore is also responsible for creating the Ellon. With the power contained in the ore, the Black Moon can create an explosion the size of an entire universe.

The Bomberman Brothers explore Aquastar and defeat the Spike Quintet. Afterwards they are contacted by the leader of the Black Moon, Fusell, who tells the crew the Ellon are evil and they should retreat from their mission. They explore the Unknown Planet inhabited by Black Moon where Fusell explains his history with the Ellon. Their previous planet was destroyed due to disputes about ownership of the Ellon, creating the Lugion, a type of Ellon without the memory of their past civilization. The Bomberman Brothers venture to the control room attempting to prevent the explosion. When inside, Fusell explains his suffering was prolonged due to the Lugion saving him from his home planet's explosion, which is why he desires to destroy the universe and himself.

Upon Fusell's defeat, he reveals the Ellonite-powered machine inside of the planet, and how the Ellon used throughout their adventure have died, with no memory of the Bomberman Brothers. Despite White's wishes, the Ellon team up once more to defeat the Central Monolith. The crew leave the planet with Fusell alive, instructing him to convert the Lugion into Ellon by reinstating their memories.

== Release ==
After announcing the termination of the free-to-play multiplayer game Super Bomberman R Online on December 1, 2022, Konami teased that "The "Bomberman" series is moving forward with new projects". During a Nintendo Direct Mini presentation aired on June 28, 2022, Super Bomberman R 2 was revealed. Its announcement introduced multiple new game modes and announced the scheduled release year for 2023. It was announced to coincide with the Bomberman franchise's 40th anniversary, being revealed after the 6th anniversary of Super Bomberman R (2017). It was advertised by Konami to have the largest amount of content in the history of the Bomberman series. Physical copies first launched in North America on September 12, 2023. In North America, the game released for Nintendo Switch, PC, PlayStation 4, PlayStation 5, Xbox One, Xbox Series X and Series S on September 13, 2023 in North America. It released one day later on September 14, 2023 in Europe and Japan.

At release, the character Bean Bomber was added to the in-game shop, based on the player character from Fall Guys (2020). An update on December 19, 2023 added a new character, Luca Bright Bomber, based on Luca Blight from Suikoden II. Additionally, the update added room lobbies for private online matches. From September 25 to October 2, 2023, Super Bomberman R 2 collaborated with mobile game developer Fingersoft to bring their Bomberman characters to Hill Climb Racing 2.

== Reception ==
Reception

Aggregate score
Aggregator	Score
Metacritic	68/100 (NS); 69/100 (PS5)

Review scores
Publication	Score
Game Informer	5.8/10 (NS)
Hardcore Gamer	
IGN	7/10 (NS)
MeriStation	7/10
Nintendo Life	8/10 (NS)
Nintendo World Report	5.5/10 (NS)
PC Games (DE)	7/10 (PC)
Push Square	7/10
Shacknews	7/10 (NS)
GamingBolt	7/10
The Games Machine	7/10
Vandal	8/10
Pocket Tactics	6/10
Multiplayer.it	7/10
Digitally Downloaded	4.5/5

The game received "mixed or average" reviews according to the review aggregator website Metacritic.

When previewing the game, Ian Higton writing for Eurogamer claimed the Battle 64 mode was too similar to justify the shutdown of Super Bomberman R Online.

=== Sales ===
Upon its debut, the game was the best-selling new release behind Pikmin 4, selling a total of 11,588 copies. It remained among the top ten best-selling games for another week at the tenth position.
