= HexaDrive =

Japanese video game development company

HexaDrive Inc.
- Native name: 株式会社ヘキサドライブ
- Romanized name: Kabushiki gaisha hekisa doraibu
- Type: Privately held company
- Industry: Video games
- Founded: February 2007; 19 years ago
- Founder: Masakazu Matsushita
- Headquarters: Osaka, Japan
- Key people: Masakazu Matsushita, President and CEO
- Products: Rez HD; The 3rd Birthday; Ōkami HD
- Number of employees: 125 (11/2021)
- Website: hexadrive.jp

HexaDrive Inc. (Japanese: 株式会社ヘキサドライブ, Hepburn: Kabushiki gaisha hekisa doraibu) is a Japanese independent video game developer based in Osaka, Japan. Founded by former Capcom programmer Masakazu Matsushita in February 2007, HexaDrive has worked on different titles for various systems, notably Rez HD, a HD remastering of the title Rez exclusively for Xbox Live Arcade, and The 3rd Birthday which was a collaboration between HexaDrive and Square Enix.

== Games ==
Year	Title	Publisher	Genre	Platform(s)
2008	Rez HD	Q Entertainment	Rail shooter, music game	Xbox 360
2010	The 3rd Birthday	Square Enix	Role-playing shooter, survival horror	PlayStation Portable
2012	Metal Gear Solid: Snake Eater 3D	Konami	Stealth action	Nintendo 3DS
2012	Demons' Score	Square Enix	Rhythm action game	Android, iOS
2012	Ōkami HD	Capcom	Action adventure	PlayStation 3
2012	E.X. Troopers	Capcom	Third-person shooter	PlayStation 3
2012	Metal Gear Solid: Social Ops	Konami	Action, Turn Based Strategy, Trading Card Game	Android, iOS
2013	Zone of the Enders: The 2nd Runner HD Edition (Note: Ver. 2.0 patch)	Konami	Action	PlayStation 3
2013	The Wonderful 101 (Note: Development assistance with PlatinumGames)	Nintendo	Action adventure	Wii U
2013	The Legend of Zelda: The Wind Waker HD (Note: High-resolution texture production)	Nintendo	Action adventure	Wii U
2014	Monster Hunter Freedom Unite for iOS	Capcom	Action role-playing game	iOS
2014	King Radish's Ambition	HexaDrive	Tower defense	Android, iOS
2015	Final Fantasy Type-0 HD	Square Enix	Action role-playing game	PlayStation 4, Xbox One, Microsoft Windows
2015	Rampage Land Rankers	Square Enix	Role-playing game	Android, iOS
2016	Final Fantasy XV	Square Enix	Role-playing game	PlayStation 4, Xbox One, Microsoft Windows
2017	Super Bomberman R	Konami	Action	Nintendo Switch
2017	Mario Sports Superstars (Note: Soccer AI programming assistance)	Nintendo	Sports	Nintendo 3DS
2017	Resident Evil 7: Not a Hero	Capcom	First-person shooter, survival horror	PlayStation 4, Xbox One, Microsoft Windows
2019	Monkey King: Hero Is Back	Sony Interactive Entertainment	Action	PlayStation 4, Microsoft Windows
2020	Super Bomberman R Online	Konami	Action	Stadia
2021	Super Bomberman R Online	Konami	Action	PlayStation 4, Xbox One, Nintendo Switch, Microsoft Windows
2022	Voidcrisis	HexaDrive	Action	Microsoft Windows
2023	Super Bomberman R 2	Konami	Action	PlayStation 4, PlayStation 5, Xbox One, Xbox Series X/S, Nintendo Switch, Microsoft Windows
2024	Silent Hill: The Short Message	Konami	Horror	PlayStation 5
2025	Infinity Bullets	HexaDrive	Shoot 'Em Up	Android, iOS
2026	Dragon Quest VII Reimagined	Square Enix	Role-playing game	Nintendo Switch, Nintendo Switch 2, PlayStation 5, Xbox Series X/S, Microsoft Windows
