= Chesmac =

1979 video game

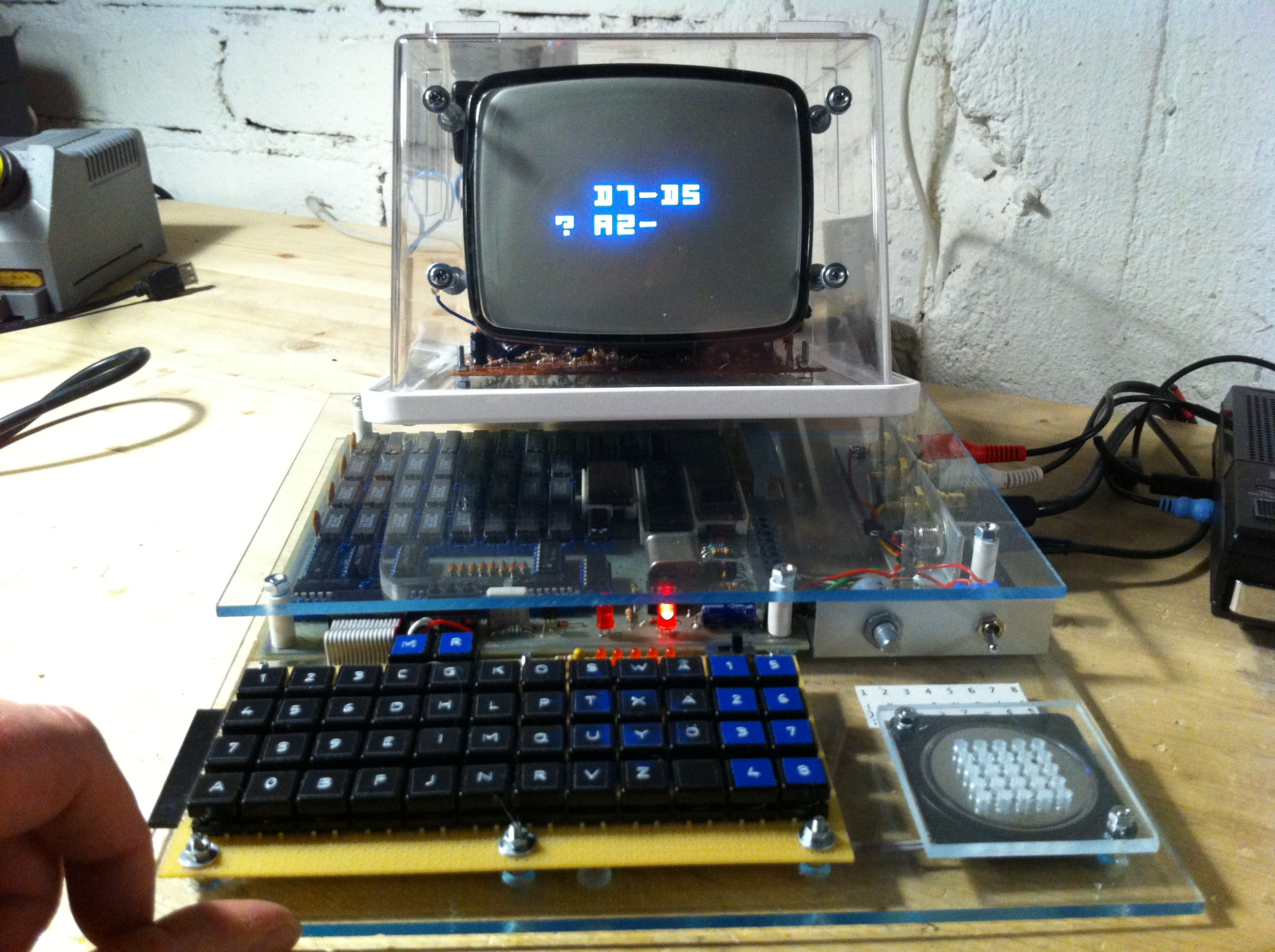
- Chesmac running on a Telmac 1800 computer in 2014
- Developer: Raimo Suonio
- Publisher: Topdata
- Engine: proprietary
- Platform: Telmac 1800
- Release: 1979
- Genre: computer chess
- Mode: single-player

Chesmac is a Finnish computer chess game programmed by Raimo Suonio for the Telmac 1800 computer, published by Topdata in 1979. It is possibly the first commercially-released video game in Finland. The game has a simple graphical user interface and the moves are entered with number-letter combinations. The computer takes so long to calculate its moves that the game has been described as resembling correspondence chess. A new version of Chesmac based on its original source code was published in 2014.

== Development history ==
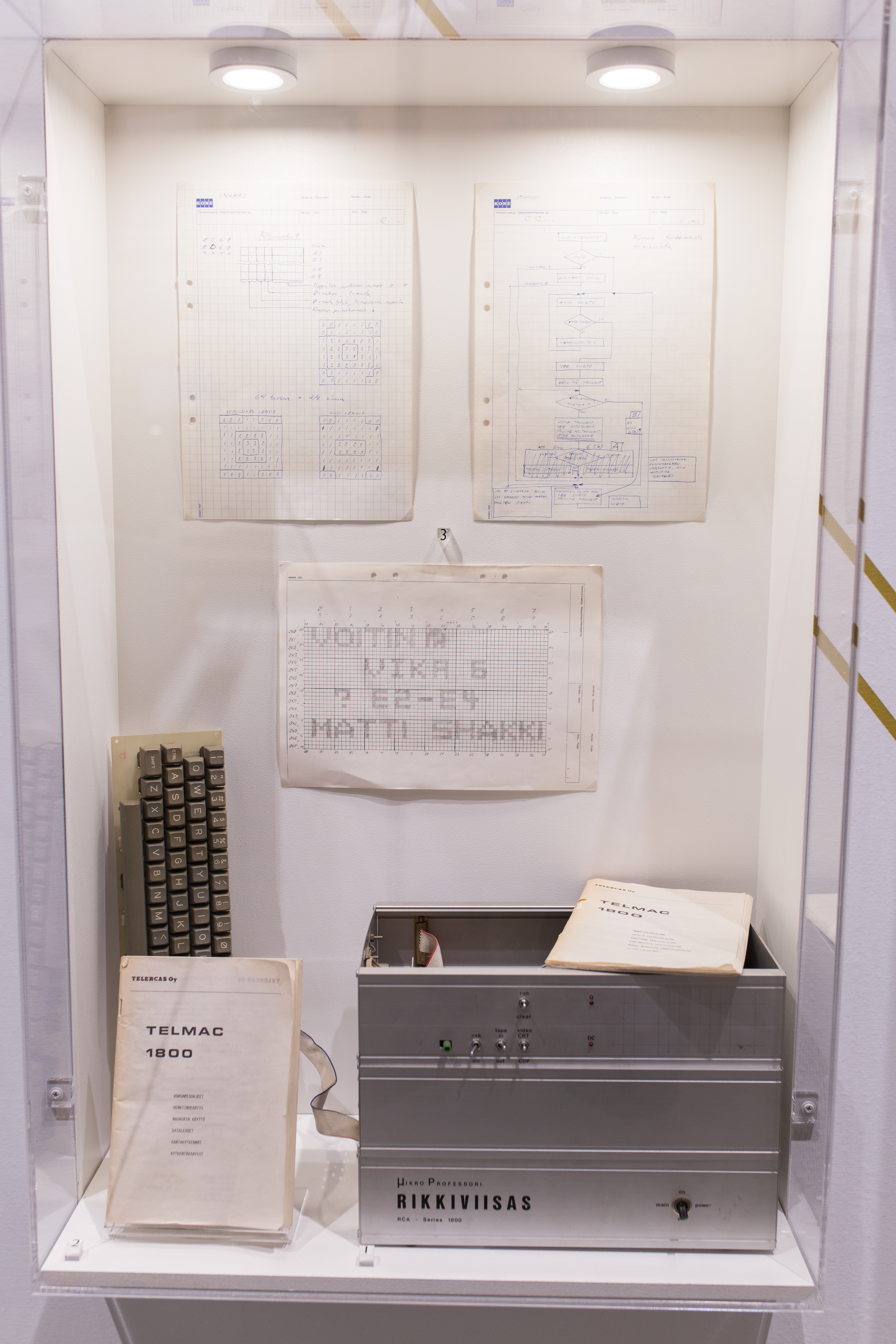
Development material for Chesmac at the Finnish Museum of Games in Tampere

According to Suonio, he developed Chesmac while unemployed in February 1979. Before this he had programmed a Tic-Tac-Toe game on a HP-3000 minicomputer while working at the crane factory at Kone. After getting a job at the microcomputer shop Topdata in March, Suonio made a deal with the shop's owner Teuvo Aaltio that Chesmac would be sold at the shop on cassette tape. According to Suonio the game sold 104 copies for 68 Finnish markka each (equivalent to about €45 in 2023). Suonio got the entire income from the sales to himself. On the B side of the tape Suonio wrote a version of John Conway's Game of Life for the Telmac.

The user interface of the game is written in the CHIP-8 language and the actual gameplay in machine code. Per requests from Topdata's customers, the Prosessori magazine published a guide about how to save a chess game in progress onto cassette tape and resume it later. No original copies of the game are known to survive, but Suonio had written the source code onto paper. Computer hobbyist Jari Lehtinen later wrote a new version of the game based on this code in 2014.

== Gameplay ==
According to Suonio, Chesmac is a "quite simple and slow" chess game. There are eight levels of play: on the lowest level the game calculates its move for a quarter of an hour, on the highest level for about an hour. The game does not have a library of chess openings, so the game thinks of an opening move for as long as for all other moves. Because the Telmac 1800 does not support a graphical user interface, the moves are entered with letter-number combinations. If the player wishes to see the positions of the chess pieces, they have to replicate the game situation on a physical chessboard. Chesmac only accepts legal moves, but castling and en passant are not supported. The game requires a two-kilobyte memory expansion on the computer's motherboard to work. Because the computer calculates its moves for a long time, Lehtinen who wrote a new version of the game describes the game as resembling correspondence chess.

== Significance ==
Chesmac is seen as the first commercial video game published in Finland. Before the game was discovered, the video game industry in Finland thought the first commercially published video game in Finland was Mehulinja developed by Simo Ojaniemi in 1984. According to Markku Reunanen and Manu Pärssinen Chesmac can still not be seen as a "start" for the video games industry in Finland but instead as an "interesting exceptional case". They thought it was impressive that Suonio got the 1.75 MHz microprocessor of the Telmac 1800 to play chess.
