= Telmac TMC-600 =

Finnish microcomputer introduced in 1982

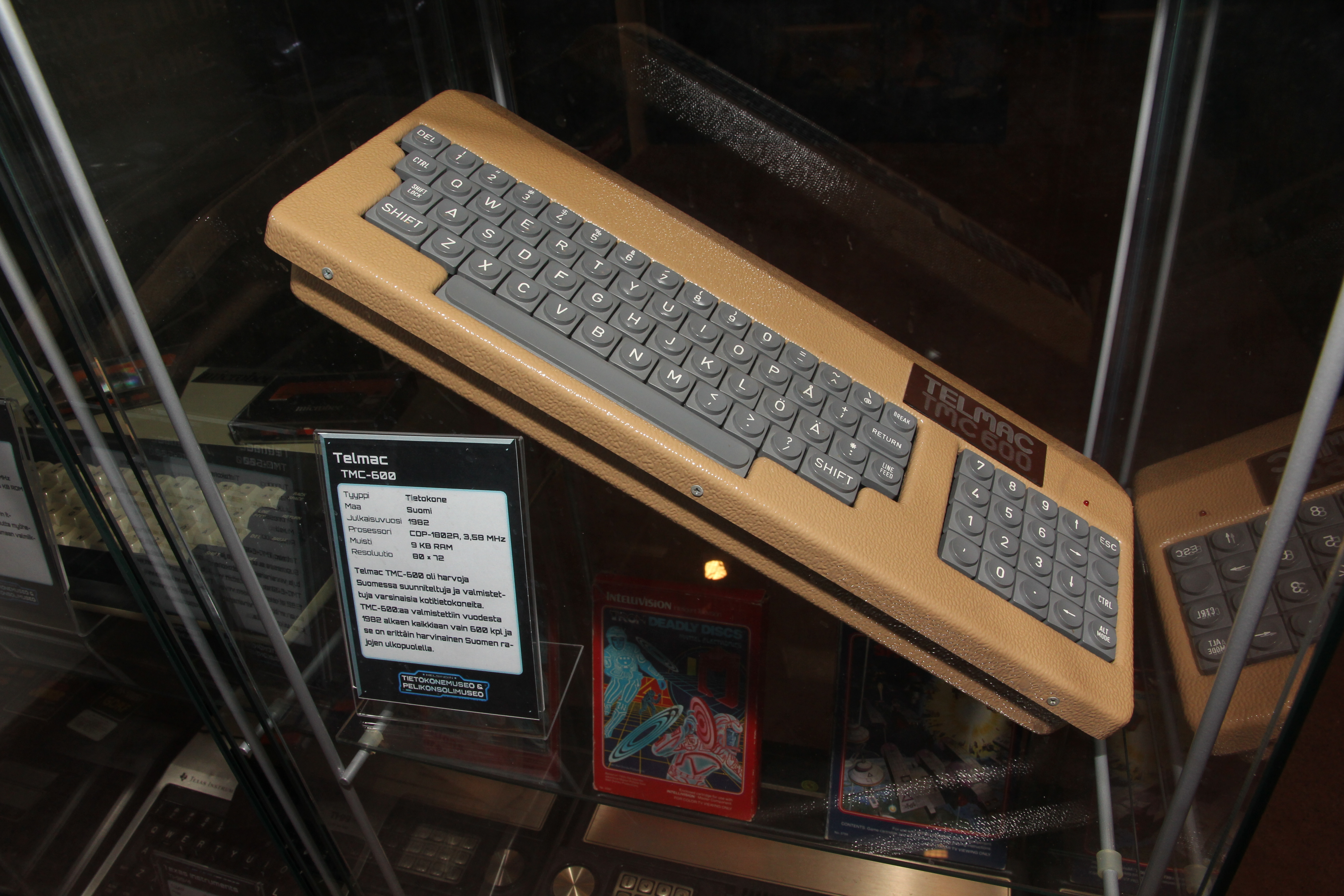
- Telmac TMC-600
- Developer: Telercas Oy
- Type: Home computer
- Released: 1982; 44 years ago
- Media: Compact Cassette
- Operating system: Telercas SBASIC
- CPU: RCA 1802 (COSMAC) @ 3.58 MHz
- Memory: 9 kB RAM, expandable to 30 kB
- Display: VIS (CDP1869 + CDP1870)
- Graphics: 80×72 pixels display resolution, 40x24 characters
- Sound: CDP1869 one channel
- Predecessor: Telmac 1800
- Successor: Telmac TMC-2000

The Telmac TMC-600 is a Finnish microcomputer introduced in 1982 by Telercas Oy, a Finnish importer of RCA microchips.

Only 600 units were produced, making it very rare today. The TMC-600 was the only commercially available BASIC-based home computer designed and manufactured in Finland.

== Specifications ==
- RCA 1802A (COSMAC) CPU at 3.579 MHz
- Cassette tape interface (DIN-5)
- VIS (Video Interface System): CDP1869 and CDP1870 companion ICs
- 8 kB RAM (expandable to 30 kB) and 1.5 KB of video RAM
- 80 × 72 pixels graphical display resolution
- 40 × 24 character display resolution
- CDP1869 one channel sound
- Telercas SBASIC
- Ports: TV RF, composite video (DIN-5), Centronics, expansion

== See also ==
- Telmac 1800
