= Super Bomberman R Online =

- Developer: Konami
- Publisher: Konami
- Director: Takuya Sokukawa
- Producer: Tatsunori Matsuo
- Engine: Unity
- Platforms: Google Stadia, Nintendo Switch, PlayStation 4, Windows, Xbox One
- Release: Stadia; September 1, 2020; PS4, Xbox One, Switch, Windows; May 27, 2021
- Genre: Battle royale
- Mode: Multiplayer

Super Bomberman R Online (Note: Japanese: スーパーボンバーマン R オンライン) was a free-to-play battle royale game developed and published by Konami. It was a multiplayer-only spin-off to Super Bomberman R (2017).

Super Bomberman R Online was released as an exclusive title for Google Stadia on September 1, 2020. It was ported and released on Nintendo Switch, PlayStation 4, Windows, and Xbox One.

It exceeded 3 million downloads across all platforms in July 2021, but was reported to have struggled maintaining an audience. The service was terminated on December 1, 2022. It was succeeded by Super Bomberman R 2 (2023), which integrated the Battle 64 as a side game mode.

== Gameplay ==
Super Bomberman R Online is a battle royale spin-off of Super Bomberman R (2017). It shares the signature gameplay of the Bomberman series: players compete in grid-based arenas, and they have to use bombs to reveal power-up panels hidden in blocks and defeat their opponents.

Before joining a new game, players choose their playable Bomberman character, each of which has its own stats that govern how it can be upgraded during a match. The Bomberman characters include crossover characters from Konami video games, including Castlevania, Contra, Gradius, Metal Gear, Princess Tomato in the Salad Kingdom, Pop'n Music, and Silent Hill. Later updates introduced additional characters from both Konami and non-Konami video games such as Suikoden and Fall Guys.

== Development and release ==
Developed and published by Konami, Super Bomberman R Online was directed by Takuya Sokukawa and produced by Tatsunori Matsuo, the latter of which had worked on mobile games, including those in the Bomberman series. Matsuo said Super Bomberman R (2017) was developed specifically for consoles, and the developer wanted to expand the Bomberman intellectual property's potential by creating an online-exclusive experience where there was more opportunity for people to enjoy.

It was officially announced in June 2020 as an exclusive title for Google Stadia. It was released as a free-to-play title for anyone with a Stadia account, the second Stadia game to do so after Destiny 2. Players with Stadia Pro subscription could claim the Premium Edition, granting access to additional playable characters and private matchmaking feature, for free until November 30, after which it cost $9.99. It was released on PlayStation 4, Xbox One, Nintendo Switch and Steam on 27 May 2021.

Season 3 ended on May 12, 2022 without an announcement of the fourth. On June 1, 2022, Konami announced it would terminate all services for Super Bomberman R Online. All paid transactions were suspended immediately on the same day. It was shut down on December 1, 2022, 18 months after coming to consoles.

== Reception ==
Reception

Review scores
| Publication | Score |
|---|---|
| Nintendo Life | 5/10 |
| Nintendo World Report | 8/10 |
| TechRaptor | 6/10 |
| Gamereactor | 8/10 |

Konami stated in July 2021 that Super Bomberman R Online surpassed 3 million downloads across all platforms. In June 2022, PC Gamer's Mollie Taylor analyzed it struggled to maintain an audience based on the data available from the Steam client. SteamDB indicated its concurrent player number for the Windows version peaked with 7,000 players at launch, and had been around 200 since September 2021. User reviews on Steam criticized its inability to find battle matches and key features like partying up with friends being locked behind a paywall.

== Legacy ==
In an announcement for the shutdown, Konami stated, "The Bomberman series is moving forward with new projects. We hope to be able to inform you of this project soon." On September 12, 2023, Konami released a new title, Super Bomberman R 2, for the PlayStation 4, PlayStation 5, Xbox One, Xbox Series X/S, and Windows. It includes an online game mode called Battle 64, which works identically to the battle royale gameplay of Super Bomberman R Online.
