= IAssociate =

2009 video game

iAssociate
- Developer: Fredrik Wahrman (TicBits)
- Platforms: iOS, Android
- Release: July 9, 2009
- Genre: Word / Puzzle

iAssociate is an iOS word association game by Finnish developer Fredrik Wahrman, released on July 9, 2009. Sequels developed by TicBits include iAssociate 2 (released May 21, 2010), iAssociate 2: Xmas (released Nov 30, 2010) and iAssociate 3 (released Nov, 2018) (Animoca Brands).

== Gameplay ==
Players are provided with a mostly empty space with one central concept and off-shooting blank words. They have to think of words that associate with the provided word, thereby unlocking new words and new associations. The aim of each level is to correctly fill up every word link.

"The game features tons of different levels and categories, and online leaderboards to compare your skills."

== Critical reception ==
=== iAssociate ===
AppSafari gave it 4/5 stars, writing "That said, this is still a really solid puzzle game, one that can easily occupy hours and hours of your time. A little on the stark side, it's both fun and easy to play. If you like word puzzles, iAssociate is an absolute must try." TUAW said "Developed by Fredrik Wahrman, iAssociate brings Funny Farm-style interaction to the iPhone. It's a really fun (and quite challenging) implementation with over a half dozen separate puzzles to work on, promising hours and hours of game play." TechnologyTell said "All in all, this was a pleasantly entertaining game."

=== iAssociate 2 ===
SlideToPlay rated the game 4 out of 4, writing, " If you like your word games simple yet brain-tickling, iAssociate 2 is perfect. " AndroidGamesReviews gave it 4 out of 5 stars, commenting, "iAssociate 2: Test your knowledge and vocabulary in this fantastic word association game. Rating: 4/5 A fantastic game which is fun to enjoy in a group, in couples, or by yourself. It's unique, interesting and educational all at once... it could even help someone with out-of-the-box thinking and improve creativity! There's no reason why you shouldn't download this free title and give it a whirl. " AppSafari gave it 4/5 stars and said, "It's clear a lot of love went into smoothing out the humps and bumps from the first version, and the effort has paid off in a big way. Still, aside from the gorgeous new interface and a few additional features, there isn't a lot about iAssociate 2 to differentiate itself from the original, but it's definitely a game well-worth trying if you're a fan of words." TheAppEra said, "The game needs a name change, i-Something isn't made for everything. Now that's out of the way, this is a VERY addictive guessing game. There's a Flash version of this game somewhere but this is far better!" Jeremy Parish, senior editor of USgamer described the game as "Another from the 'wife wanted me to play this one with her' files".

=== iAssociate 3 ===
iAssociate 3 is the sequel to iAssociate 2, which was named favourite new game by Ricki Lake and was downloaded over a million times. iAssociate 3 includes a new and improved input method for entering answers, a new daily challenge, and more game levels than its predecessor.
