= Road to Vostok =

Early access video game

- Developer: Road to Vostok
- Publisher: Road to Vostok
- Designer: Antti Leinonen
- Engine: Godot
- Platform: Windows
- Release: 7 April 2026 (Early Access)
- Genres: First-person shooter, survival game
- Mode: Single-player

Road to Vostok is a first-person indie survival game developed by Finnish developer Antti Leinonen. The game is set in a post-apocalyptic scenario, centered on the border between Finland and Russia. The player sets off on a journey eastward with the main goal of survival.

The game was released into early access on 7 April 2026. It has received positive reception.

== Story ==
An explosion in the Port of Hamina on Midsummer's Eve releases chemicals into the air, causing an environmental disaster. The entire Kymenlaakso region has to be evacuated. The region, currently known as Area 05, is preparing for the border crossing, but the disaster has triggered a conflict in the border area, and the border area is being monitored by Frontex, the European Border and Coast Guard Agency.

== Gameplay ==
The player's dangerous journey takes, among other things, along the devastated Highway 7 (E18).

The player's task is to collect various equipment, weapons, and food, and use them to survive as they progress through the border zone and reach Vostok. The game involves equipping your own base and defending yourself from enemies. The game is also known for not holding the player's hand, but instead making the player survive as best they can on their own. As well, the game features a permadeath mechanic once the player enters Vostok, which results in all progress being lost upon death.

=== Maps ===
There are currently nine maps split into three regions in the early access version, with a new map planned with each major update.

Area 05

- Village
- Highway
- School
- Outpost

Border Zone

- Bridge
- Minefield

Vostok

- Airfield
- Apartments
- Terminal

== Development ==
According to Leinonen, the idea for the game was born in 2012. The inspiration behind it was his own childhood town of Hamina and southeastern Finland. The game's name, Road to Vostok, came from Highway 7, which runs through Hamina, and is the "road to east" leading to the Russian border.

The development of the game was well documented with Leinonen publishing frequent dev logs on the official Road to Vostok YouTube channel. He also communicated with interested fans on his Patreon. Leinonen collaborated with Varusteleka, a Finnish company specializing in the sale of military equipment, on a limited edition of game-themed fabric badges, which sold for over €15,000. In addition, Leinonen made sponsored videos, gave seminar talks, and attended lectures.

Originally the game was being developed in the Unity engine, but due to Unity's controversial runtime fee in September 2023, Leinonen chose to port the game to Godot.

A free demo version of the game was released on Steam in March 2024, where players could test the game's features. The demo has been downloaded over 1.1 million times.

An early access version of the game released on 7 April 2026.

== Reception ==
The game has been a sales success reaching over 180,000 copies sold in the first week and has received highly positive user reviews, with players highlighting its realistic gun mechanics, tense atmosphere, and unforgiving survival systems as standout features. In its release week, Road to Vostok was the 13th best-selling game on Steam worldwide in terms of revenue.

According to Leinonen, this early success has "secured the entire development roadmap for the future," and he promised that the proceeds from early access will be used for the further development and finishing of Road to Vostok, also considering hiring assistants.

In 2023, the game was awarded the Creative Achievement of the Year at the Finnish Game Awards.

== See also ==
- List of first-person shooters
- Video games in Finland
