= TicBits =

Finnish mobile game developer

TicBits Ltd.
- Type: Private
- Industry: Video games
- Founded: 2010
- Founder: Fredrik Wahrman; Niklas Wahrman
- Headquarters: Turku, Finland
- Key people: Marcus Alanen; CEO
- Products: iAssociate; Crazy Kings; Crazy Defense Heroes
- Owner: Animoca Brands
- Number of employees: 10
- Website: ticbits.com

TicBits Ltd. is a mobile game development company based in Turku, Finland, founded in 2010 by cousins Fredrik and Niklas Wahrman. The company specializes in both original games, mainly for the iOS platform, as well as its own interpretations of classic games. In Deloitte Technology Fast 50 Finland 2013, TicBits was placed third in the Rising Stars 2013 list. In July 2016, Ticbits was acquired by ASX-listed mobile game developer Animoca Brands for 5.4 million AUD.

== Games ==
In addition to developing classic games for mobile devices such as mahjong, minesweeper, solitaire, freecell, Sudoku, Ticbits has developed interpretations of other games, such as its match-three game Cruel Jewels, word games Jewel Words and Word Strike, and tower defense games Crazy Kings and Crazy Defense Heroes.

=== Current games ===
- Crazy Defense Heroes
- Crazy Kings
- Cruel Jewels
- FreeCell :)
- iAssociate 2
- iAssociate 3
- Jewel Words
- Mahjong :)
- Minesweeper!
- Solitaire :)
- Solitaire Gold
- Sudoku :)
- Toon Match
- Unblock :)
- Word Strike

=== iAssociate 2 ===
TicBits' most popular game is iAssociate 2, the second version of iAssociate, a word association game developed by its CEO Fredrik Wahrman. The game was one of TUAW's favorite apps of 2009. The game was also mentioned on ABC's Good Morning America. In addition, actress and talk show host Ricki Lake noted on Ustream in 2012 that iAssociate 2 was her favorite app at the time.
