= Super Bomberman R =

2017 video game

- Packaging artwork for the Switch version
- Developers: Konami; HexaDrive
- Publisher: Konami
- Director: Akihiro Mitsuda
- Producers: Noriaki Okamura; Yuji Korekado
- Designers: Masanori Yasuda; Ryuichiro Taki
- Programmer: Shunsuke Yamamoto
- Artist: Junichi Morita
- Writers: Kaede Ogawa; Gol Koganei; Moe Yamazaki
- Composers: Seima Iwahashi; Daisuke Kikuta
- Series: Bomberman
- Engine: Unity
- Platforms: Nintendo Switch; PlayStation 4; Windows; Xbox One
- Release: Nintendo Switch; 3 March 2017; PS4, Windows, Xbox One; NA: 12 June 2018; JP/PAL: 14 June 2018
- Genres: Action, maze
- Modes: Single-player, multiplayer

Super Bomberman R (Note: Japanese: スーパーボンバーマン Ｒ, Hepburn: Sūpā Bonbāman Āru) is an action-maze game developed by Konami and HexaDrive and published by Konami for the Nintendo Switch. The game was first released worldwide as a launch title for the console in March 2017, before releasing for PlayStation 4, Windows and Xbox One in June 2018. Part of the Bomberman franchise, it is the sixth installment of the Super Bomberman series and the first game in the series to be released in twenty years (following 1997's Super Bomberman 5). It is also the first Bomberman entry in the franchise to be developed for consoles following the dissolution of original series developer Hudson Soft in 2012.

The game received mixed reviews. As of March 2021, the game has sold over 2 million copies worldwide. A sequel, Super Bomberman R 2, was released for Nintendo Switch, PlayStation 4, PlayStation 5, Windows, Xbox One, Xbox Series X/S in September 2023 as part of the Bomberman franchise's 40th anniversary.

== Gameplay ==
Players move through a two-dimensional grid environment and must trap and drop bombs to defeat their opponents. The game features story mode spanning 50 stages and supports cooperative gameplay for two players. The game also features an eight-player competitive multiplayer mode. The online mode contains a league system (Baby A/B, Novice A/B, Amateur A/B, Pro A/B, Champ A/B and God A/B). Starting in Baby league B the player has to win matches to gather and earn points for advancement.

Battle mode includes 19 battlegrounds in total. Besides the classic arena, it also offers a multi-level arena with springboards, ice-patterns, moveable blocks, etc., each with a unique style. In addition to the eight Bomberman Bros. and the Five Dastardly Bombers, Super Bomberman R also features a selection of new characters based on Konami Originals, such as Dracula Bomber, Vic Viper Bomber, Goemon Bomber and more. In total, there are 27 characters, each with special abilities.

Grand Prix was introduced with an update in November 2017. It contains 3 vs 3 battles in offline or online matches within 3 different arenas. Alongside new characters (with unique abilities) the player's goal is to collect as many gems as possible within the given time. Alternate mode is team fight which counts the total wins (blow-ups).

== Plot ==
In a robot scrapyard on Planet Scrapheap, Emperor Buggler resurrects five robots to be his new henchmen, the Five Dastardly Bombers. Meanwhile, on Planet Bomber, White, the eldest and most disciplined of the eight heroic Bomberman Brothers of Planet Bomber, tries getting his younger siblings to train his siblings to no avail. Black is lazy and egocentric, Pink is more concerned about fashion and gossip, Blue sleeps all day, Red is hot-tempered and reckless, Yellow is overly naïve and innocent, Aqua has anger management issues, and Green is a manipulative sneak who deceives everyone. Just then, their television begins broadcasting a signal from Buggler, who proclaims his goal to conquer the universe and his army has already conquered five planets (Brainwave, Lalaland, Scrapheap, Technopolis, and Timbertree) of the Starry Sky Nebula, swearing that all other planets will soon follow. He offers a challenge to anyone who would defy him to fight his generals. White immediately takes up the challenge and forces his siblings to come with him as he heads to the Starry Sky Nebula to face the Buggler army.

White and his siblings advance on the five worlds Buggler's henchmen have conquered, solving many issues linked to their conquest and defeating Buggler's army and his henchmen. However, when Buggler dares them to face him in outer space, the Bombermen discover that Buggler has created a black hole to destroy the universe while they were busy freeing the planets under his rule. Buggler summons his defeated henchmen to build a massive robot possessing all of their powers to overpower the Bombermen siblings, but they manage to defeat it. In response, Buggler merges with the robot, enlarging himself in the process. Just then, the Five Dastardly Bombers, now free from Buggler's control, give the siblings energy from Buggler's black hole and assist them in defeating Buggler and destroying the black hole. Despite receiving praise for saving the universe, however, White's siblings still refuse to train with White, to his anger.

== Release ==
Super Bomberman R was developed by Konami and HexaDrive, and several people involved in the game are former Hudson Soft staff who had worked in past Bomberman titles. The game was announced on 12 January 2017 and released on 3 March 2017 as a timed exclusive launch title for the Nintendo Switch console. On 20 April 2017, free downloadable content was announced alongside regular updates with various gameplay improvements. The first set includes four new stages and two new accessories. Future updates with various playable characters from other Konami franchises—including Vic Viper from Gradius, Simon Belmont from Castlevania, and Pyramid Head from Silent Hill 2—were also teased. Further updates with additions of new characters and entirely new gameplay modes are being released by Konami. Ports for PlayStation 4, Windows, and Xbox One were released in June 2018, each featuring a platform-exclusive character: Ratchet from Sony's Ratchet & Clank for the PlayStation 4 version, Master Chief from Microsoft's Halo series for the Xbox One version and P-Body from Valve's Portal 2 for the Windows version. The original Switch version also received its own exclusive character via an update: the Bomberman franchise's own MAX. An update in June 2018 added WWE professional wrestler Xavier Woods as a playable character, along with additional Konami characters such as Solid Snake, Naked Snake and Raiden from the Metal Gear series.

=== Super Bomberman R Online ===
A free-to-play, online-only spin-off titled Super Bomberman R Online was released on Stadia on 1 September 2020, and on PlayStation 4, Xbox One, Nintendo Switch and Steam on 27 May 2021, and was shut down on 1 December 2022.

== Reception ==
Reception

Aggregate score
Aggregator	Score
Metacritic	67/100 (PS4); 63/100 (XONE); 62/100 (NS)

Review scores
Publication	Score
Destructoid	7/10
Edge	4/10
Electronic Gaming Monthly	7.5/10
Game Informer	5/10
GameRevolution	3.5/5
GameSpot	7/10
IGN	6.2/10
Nintendo Life	8/10
Nintendo World Report	7/10

Nintendo Life's preview stated that "Super Bomberman R isn't going to break any ground with its familiar explosions and mayhem, but it doesn't have to; sometimes, colourful old-school gaming is refreshing in this era of progressively darker and more complex titles." This was reiterated in their review, with Steve Bowling describing it as "no-frills", but "the go-to multiplayer launch title" for the Switch.

Super Bomberman R received "generally mixed reviews", according to review aggregator website Metacritic. The main point of criticism from critics was the game's lack of innovation from previous Bomberman titles. Ryan McCaffrey, in a mixed review for IGN, said its multiplayer options were "classic Bomberman rules [...] but not much else" and overall found its overall content to be "disappointing". Chris Carter of Destructoid said that "there's nothing here you haven't seen before, so if you're just going to be checking in solo, it probably isn't going to be worth your time." Ray Carsillo, in a more positive review for Electronic Gaming Monthly, appreciated its traditional gameplay as a "homage to the Bomberman games of the past", concluding that it "might not pack the punch of one of Bomberman's bombs when you think of console launch titles, but it's still a quality experience."

The game's pricing was also a frequent point of criticism. McCaffrey said that it would be "reasonable to expect a bit more from a $50 Bomberman game", contrasting its value with 2007's Bomberman Live, "a brilliant, fully featured Bomberman [...] that came out 10 years ago, and it only cost $10". Carter commented that it "feels like an arcade game with a $50 price tag." Griffin Vacheron of GameRevolution was generally positive towards the game overall, but felt that the pricing was "hardly worth it to play by your lonesome". Edge called it a "cheap game with an expensive price tag".

=== Sales ===
In Japan, the game's debut week sales reached 39,609 copies sold, marking the highest first-week sales for a Bomberman game since 1998's Bomberman World, which sold 76,801 copies in its first week. By August 2018, the game had sold over a million copies worldwide across all platforms. As of March 2021, the game has sold over 2 million copies worldwide.
