= Dreamloop Games =

Finnish Game Developer

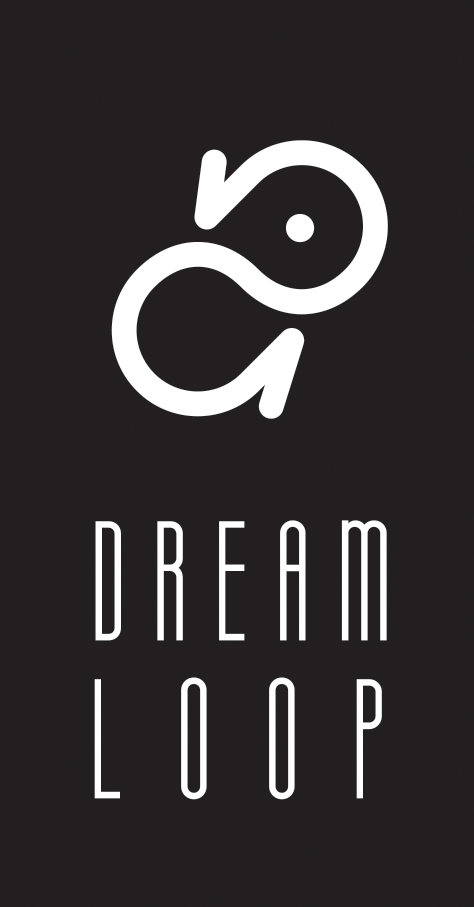
- Company type: Corporation
- Industry: Video games
- Founded: 2014
- Founders: Hannes Väisänen; Joni Lappalainen; Steve Stewart
- Headquarters: Tampere, Finland
- Key people: Joni Lappalainen; (Co-Founder, CEO); Steve Stewart; (Co-founder, CMO/Creative Director); Hannes Väisänen; (Co-Founder, CTO)
- Products: Challengers of Khalea (PC/Mac)
- Revenue: €1.5 million (2024)
- Number of employees: 25 (2024)
- Website: https://www.dreamloop.net/

Dreamloop Games Ltd., known as Dreamloop, is a Finnish video game developer based in Tampere, Finland. The company was founded in August 2014 by current chief executive officer Joni Lappalainen, current chief technical officer Hannes Väisänen, and current chief marketing officer/creative director Steve Stewart. All three founders previously worked together at Fragment Production, where Stewart served as Marketing Director.

As of December 2024, Dreamloop employed 25 people, and was led by its founders.

In late 2015 Dreamloop began actively campaigning to reform Finnish laws surrounding Crowdfunding. Thee company highlighted regulatory challenges that made it difficult for Finnish studios to access international crowdfunding platforms, such as Kickstarter, and advocated for legislative change to support local creators.

In 2015 Dreamloop launched a Kickstarter campaign to finance production of their upcoming game Challengers of Khalea, but funding was unsuccessful.

== Games ==
In November 2015, Dreamloop released the arcade shooter Stardust Galaxy Warriors for PC. The game features 1-4 player local co-op multiplayer, and has been received well by both critics and the Steam community. In April 2016, in an interview on PopGeeks.net, Dreamloop Games announced that it would bring Stardust Galaxy Warriors to consoles. Stardust Galaxy Warriors currently maintains a 93% positive rating on Steam.

In 2023, Dreamloop published Inescapable: No Rules, No Rescue, a visual novel published by Aksys Games that currently has mixed reviews. The game was recognized within the Finnish gaming industry and was nominated for the Finnish Game of the Year 2023 award.
