= Telmac 1800 =

1977 microcomputer

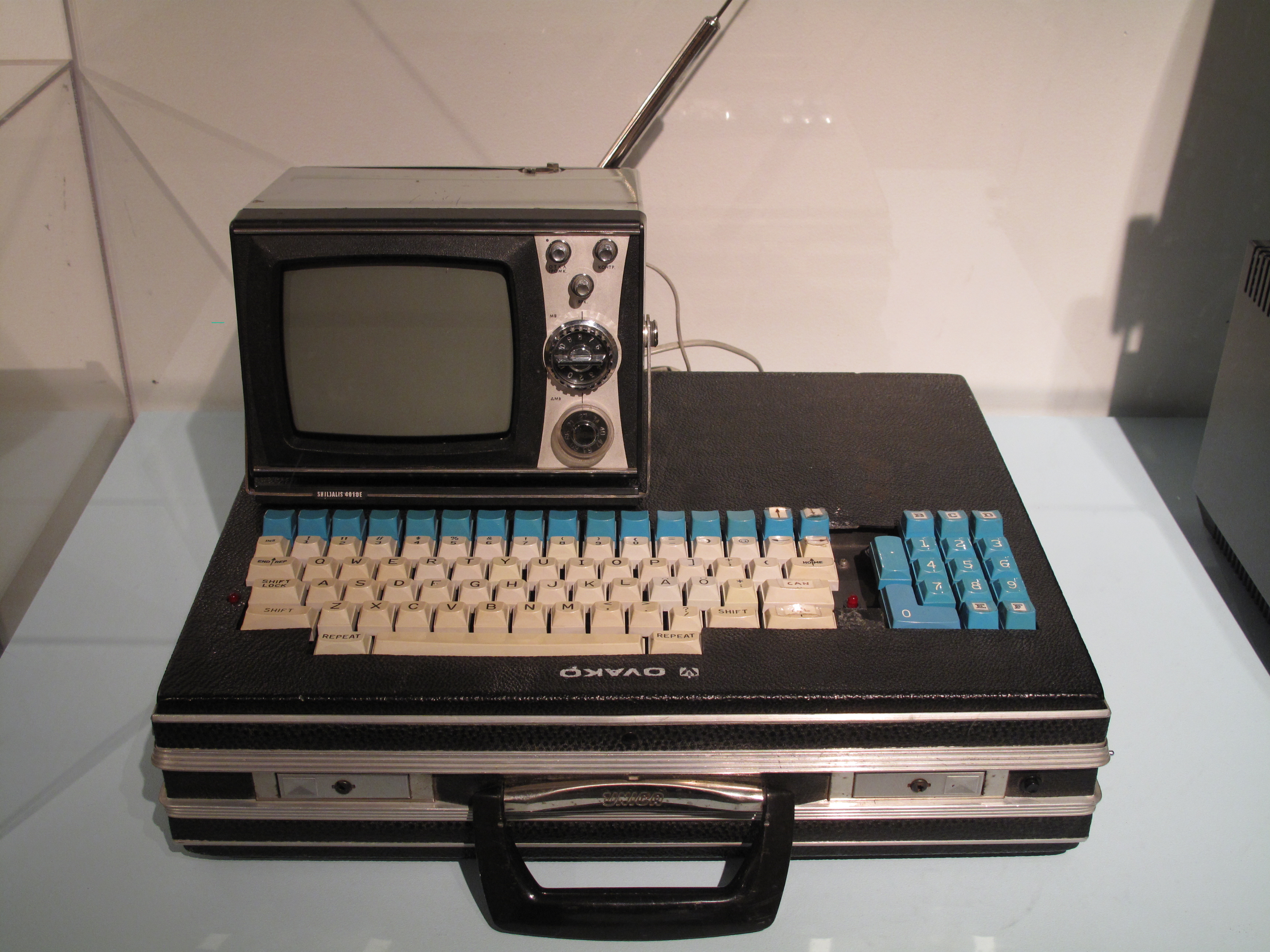
- Telmac 1800 assembled using a briefcase as a computer case.
- Type: Home computer, Computer kit
- Released: 1977; 49 years ago
- Units sold: 2000
- Media: Compact Cassette
- CPU: RCA 1802 (COSMAC) microprocessor CPU
- Memory: 2 kB RAM, expandable to 4 kB
- Display: 64×128 pixels display resolution
- Graphics: RCA CDP1861
- Sound: fixed frequency tone
- Successor: Telmac TMC-600 / Telmac TMC-2000

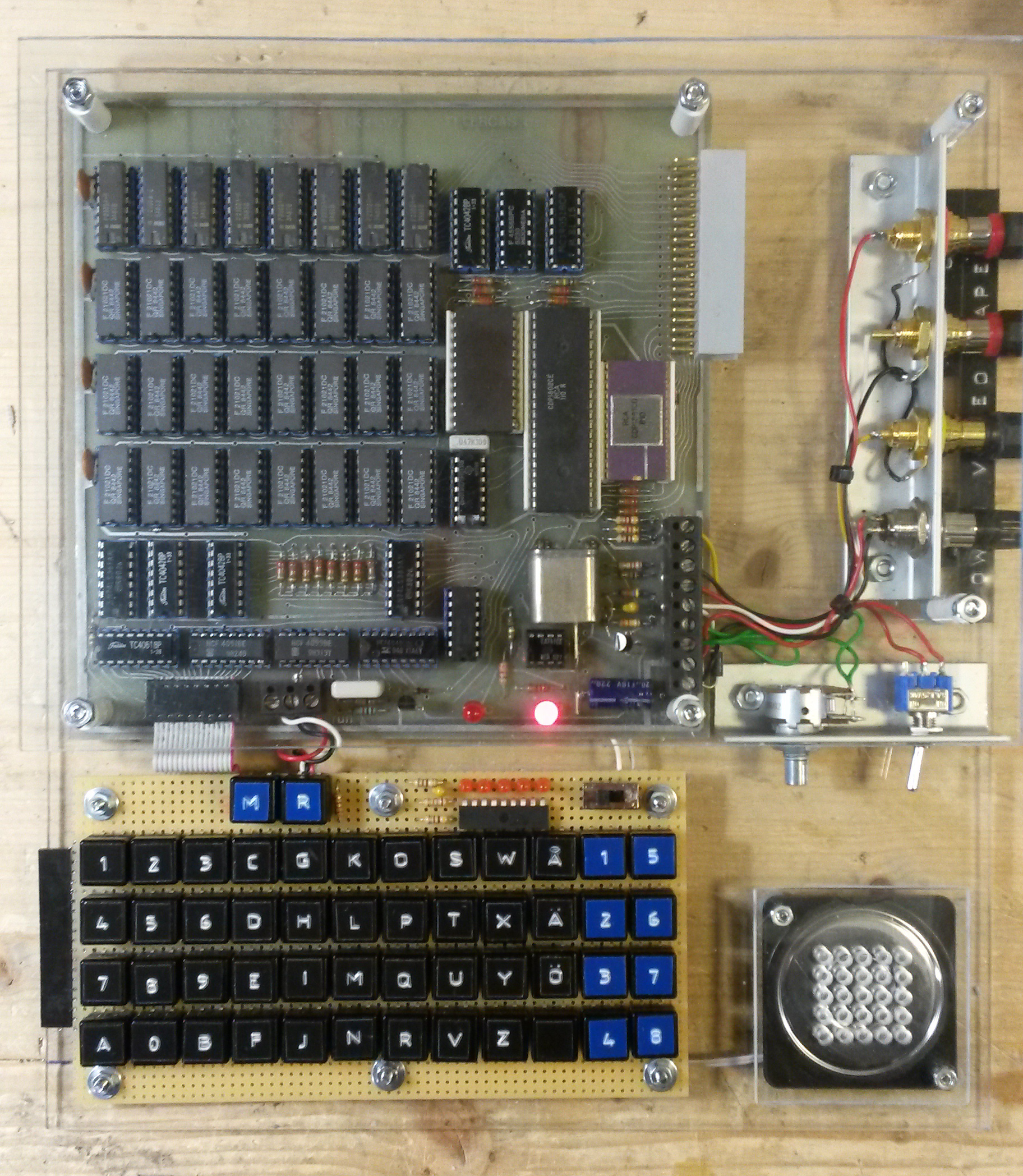
Telmac 1800 Microcomputer

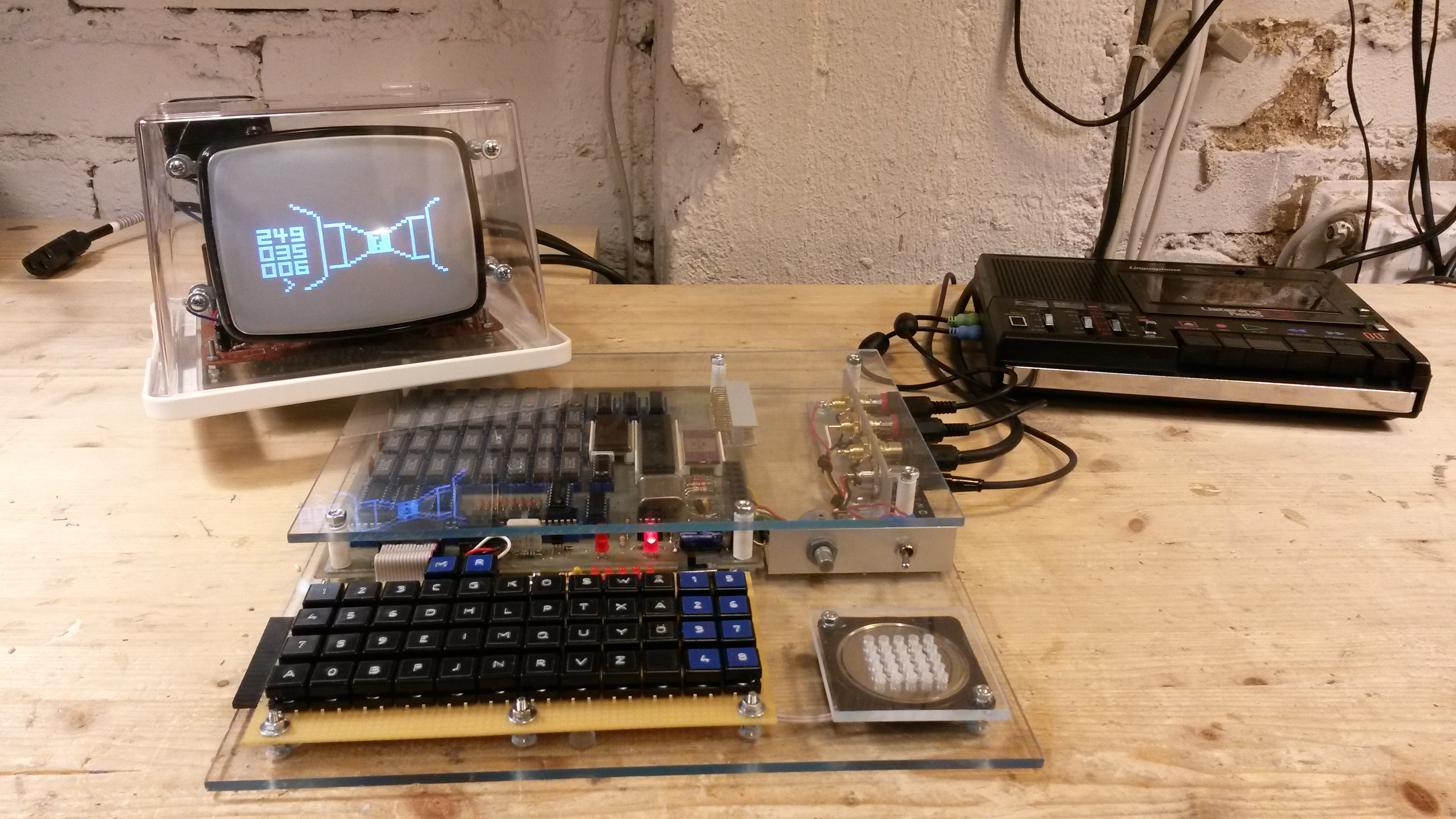
Telmac 1800 Microcomputer

The Telmac 1800 is an early microcomputer that was delivered in kit form. It was introduced in 1977 by Telercas Oy, the Finnish importer of RCA microchips. Most of the 2,000 kits manufactured over four years were bought by electronics enthusiasts in Finland, Sweden and Norway.

An expansion board, OSCOM, later became available, and included an alphanumeric video display, and up to 12 kB of memory. A 4 kB Tiny BASIC could be run on this configuration.

The first-ever commercial video game to be developed in Finland, Chesmac, was developed by Raimo Suonio on a Telmac 1800 computer in 1979.

The Telmac 1800 was followed by the Oscom Nano and the Telmac 2000.

== Major features ==
- RCA 1802 (COSMAC) microprocessor CPU @ 1.75 MHz
- Cassette tape interface
- 2 kB RAM, expandable to 4 kB
- RCA CDP1861 'Pixie' video chip, 64×128 pixels display resolution
- Sound limited to a fixed frequency tone
- Able to run a CHIP-8 interpreter

== See also ==
- Telmac TMC-600
