= Hill Climb Racing =

2012 video game

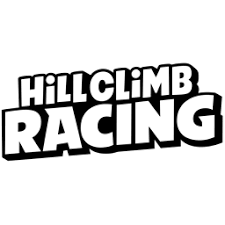
- Developer: Fingersoft
- Publisher: Fingersoft
- Director: Toni Fingerroos
- Composers: David Ko; Filippo Vicarelli; Harri Karppinen
- Platforms: Android, iOS, Microsoft Windows, Windows Phone
- Release: Android: WW: September 22, 2012; iOS: WW: November 8, 2012; Microsoft Windows: WW: October 21, 2013; Windows Phone: WW: November 27, 2013
- Genre: Racing
- Modes: Single-player, multiplayer

Hill Climb Racing is a 2012 2D physics-based racing video game released and published by the Finnish studio Fingersoft for Android, iOS, Microsoft Windows, and Windows Phone. It was originally created by Toni Fingerroos, Fingersoft's founder, and is the brand's best-known and selling game. The player controls a driver named Bill Newton across a wide variety of unlockable stages, with the goal of driving as far as possible without running out of fuel or hitting their head.

The game received favorable reviews. Critics describe the graphics as rudimentary at best or ugly, and sometimes panned the gameplay as unimpressive, but the original was overlooked when they launched the physics. Further praise went to the simplistic gas and brake control buttons and the freemium monetization model for its passive approach. Its success led to the creation of a sequel, Hill Climb Racing 2 released in 2016. In 2018, the Hill Climb Racing franchise became the first Finnish mobile game franchise since Rovio's Angry Birds to reach 1 billion downloads.

== Gameplay ==
Screenshot illustrating elevation as the main aspect of the game. Throughout this course, coins are spread in groups, with some of them accompanied by fuel and gems (as shown on the center-right). The top-left portion of the screen comprises the fuel gauge and an inventory of coins and gems.

The objective of Hill Climb Racing is to drive as far through progressively difficult racing stages as possible while collecting coins and gems, taking advantage of the non-realistic physics and using only two simple controls: the Gas and Brake pedals. While in mid-air, pressing these pedals will instead cause the vehicle to rotate, allowing the player to control the angle with which they land. Fuel is replenished by collecting cans of gas or batteries that appear at fixed points on each stage. The player can perform stunts such as driving the vehicle into the air for a prolonged time or flipping it over to earn more coins, which after the race may be spent on upgrades or to unlock new stages and vehicles (including a monster truck, rally car, moon lander, motocross bike, tank, and Santa's sleigh). Conditions ending the game are depleting the vehicle's fuel completely and/or breaking the driver's neck.

Since its inception, Hill Climb Racing has seen updates that add new content. For example, the "Garage" was introduced in a December 2016 update, where players can purchase cars and tune their parts. Gems were also introduced as another currency to the game, used to unlock the Garage and to purchase chests that contain various parts for it

== Development ==
Hill Climb Racing was developed by Toni Fingerroos, a self-taught Finnish programmer who was 29 years old at the time of the game's release. Prior to developing the game, he started writing software at the age of ten. He was intrigued by car racing, wrote the racing game Ralli 94, and shared it with his friends. At that time, he named his own hobbyist firm Fingersoft.

A decade after his first game, Fingerroos revived the Fingersoft trade name as a professional studio that programmed games for Nokia mobile phones. Fingerroos described he "failed at that quite miserably." He has since pursued other occupations, all with unfavorable outcomes. One of them was working with Pixolane, a game studio, and spending his money on developing a PlayStation 3 game called Rust Buckaneers that was ultimately cancelled as the studio wasted its seed money, causing him to accumulate debt. Another was repairing and selling sports cars imported from Japan and the United Kingdom, which also drained his personal savings. Fingerroos returned to and revived Fingersoft once more in late 2011, where as the company's sole worker, he designed a photography application every few days to see whether some of them would turn out to be successful. One of these apps was Cartoon Camera, released in February 2012 and having quickly amassed over ten million downloads. The app's profitability strengthened Fingerroos' confidence, helped him pay off debts, and secured the creation of his next project, Hill Climb Racing.

Fingerroos said he spent 16 hours a day for a couple of months developing Hill Climb Racing in a compact bedroom before completing the project. The sound assets were crowdsourced, and his friends and acquaintances drew the visuals. As Fingersoft's business manager, Jarkko Paalanen, states, the visuals were intentionally drawn to be "naïve and childish", as part of the game's character. Bill Newton, the game's protagonist, was drawn as a sketch by Fingerroos' partner Pia Turunen. Fingerroos then photographed the sketch with one of the company's earlier camera apps and modified it for the game's inclusion. It was released for Android devices on September 22, 2012. Amid the game's success, Fingerroos contacted Teemu Närhi, a former Pixoline employee, to port the game for iOS. That version was released on November 8, and the game was later ported to Microsoft Windows on October 21, 2013, and to Windows Phone on November 27.

=== Chinese version ===
Fingersoft had plans to localize Hill Climb Racing in China. They had already released the original game in that region in July 2014, in collaboration with MyGamez, a Finnish-Chinese game publisher specializing in marketing non-native mobile games to China. Paalanen saw an opportunity to appeal to the Chinese audience by altering the game's theme to match their culture, while keeping the gameplay unchanged. Hill Climb Racing: China Edition was published by MyGamez in February 2015, coinciding with Chinese New Year.

== Reception ==
Reception

Review scores
Publication	Score
Pocket Gamer	3/5
Mobil	7/10
Modojo	3.5/5

Awards
Publication	Award
Finnish App Awards	2014 App of the Year
China Mobile	Best Sports Game of 2014; Best Innovation of 2015

Hill Climb Racing's critical reception was somewhat positive, Modojo's John Bedford respectively dismissed the graphics and soundtrack as rudimentary and repetitive but found a great deal of satisfaction in mastering the controls and called the game "furiously addictive." SFGate's Peter Hartlaub praised the ability to upgrade vehicles, as he found it to dramatically improve the player's experience and demonstrate the game's "subtle" physics. Even though he found Ski Safari, a similar racing game, to have more sophisticated gameplay and better graphics and be more cartoonishly "fun," he also found Hill Climb Racing more engaging and concluded that the game is "a good example of the importance of mechanics over visuals in [the mobile gaming] market."

Pocket Gamer's Harry Slater compared it to Trials and found it to be less "bombastic" and the graphics slightly ugly but praised the simplicity of the gameplay. He called the game unimpressive, but decent in the genre of physics-based racing games and enjoyable. Swedish magazine Mobil's Elias Nordling considered the game's freemium model and noted the progression system as fast enough to not make the in-app purchases tempting. He found the controls simple and the physics difficult, but his main complaint was the fact that when starting any level, the player always starts from the beginning, rather than from the highest achieved level. Elias concluded that that obscured the feeling of achieving anything, but he ultimately liked it and found it to be addictive. In the book Finnish Video Games: A History and Catalog, Juho Kuorikoski also found the monetization to be reasonable and the mechanics addictive. He described the visuals as being "amateurish" and particularly ugly for a successful game, but later argued that "good graphics don't make a good game".

=== Sequels and spin-off ===
A sequel, titled Hill Climb Racing 2, was released to Android devices on November 28, 2016, iOS in December 2016 and Windows 10 on March 23, 2018. It features more vehicles, cups, new events, and a much better look.

Another sequel titled Hill Climb Racing 3 is currently under development, believed to have 3D graphics. It was announced in 2022.

A Lego-themed spin-off known as Lego Hill Climb Adventures was released as an open beta in early 2023 and officially launched on May 30, 2024. In October 2026, it was announced that the game would be shut down in 2027 due to its underperformance, with in-app purchases being disabled on October 23 and the game being removed from app stores on December 15. The Apple Arcade version will remain available for the foreseeable future.

=== Sales ===
In its first fiscal year, Fingersoft reported that it gained a total of €15.5 million in revenue via advertisements and in-app purchases. The company's net sales continued to rise until 2018, when Fingersoft reported net sales of €21 million, down from 2017's €29.6 million. This was attributed to the company's focus on building its team and not releasing any title in 2018, and its older games continued to be profitable. A few journalists have described the game's performance as having transformed Fingersoft into a "rags-to-riches" app studio.

In October 2013, Fingersoft announced that Hill Climb Racing had been downloaded 100 million times. In 2014, Hill Climb Racing had over 40 million active players playing it on a monthly basis. Near the end of April 2018, the company's CEO, Närhi, confirmed that the franchise had surpassed one billion downloads, becoming the second Finnish mobile game franchise—after Rovio's Angry Birds—to reach the mark and have touched 2 billion downloads combined.
