= Word Association =

Word game involving an exchange of words that are associated together

Word Association is a common word game involving an exchange of words that are associated together. The game is based on the noun phrase word association, meaning "stimulation of an associative pattern by a word" or "the connection and production of other words in response to a given word, done spontaneously as a game, creative technique, or in a psychiatric evaluation".

== Description ==
Once an original word has been chosen, usually randomly or arbitrarily, a player will find a word that they associate with it and make it known to all the players, usually by saying it aloud or writing it down as the next item on a list of words so far used. The next player must then do the same with this previous word. This continues in turns for any length of time, but often word limits are set, so that the game is agreed to end after, for instance, 400 words.

Usually, players write down the next word by merely using the first word that comes to their mind after they hear the previous one. Sometimes, however, they may put in more thought to find a more creative connection between the words. Exchanges are often fast and sometimes unpredictable (though logical patterns can usually be found without difficulty). Sometimes, a lot of the game's fun can arise from the seemingly strange or amusing associations that people make between words.

The game can be played actively or passively, sometimes taking many weeks to complete, and can in fact be played with any number of players, even one. Example: Soda, Sprite, Fairy, Tinkerbell, Peter Pan, Pans, Skillet, Kitchens, Refrigerator, Drinks, Soda

=== Variants ===
In some games, extra limitations are added; for instance:

- The associations between words must be strictly obvious, rather than the usual "first word that comes to mind", which can often require explaining to see how it is connected with the previous word.
- If played in-person, a time limit of two or three seconds can be placed to make a very fast-paced game, often combined with the previous rule of an 'explicit' connection, and extra emphasis on the idea that a previously used word cannot be repeated.
- Word Disassociation (sometimes called Dissociation) is sometimes played. In this game, the aim is to say a word that is as unrelated as possible to the previous one. In such games, however, it is often found that creativity is lowered and the words begin having obvious associations again. This game is sometimes known as "Word for Word".
- Sometimes, repeated words are forbidden or otherwise noted on a separate list for interest.
- A variant with an arbitrary name (sometimes called Ultra Word Association) involves associating words in a grid, where the first word is placed in the top-left, and where each word must be placed adjacent to another one and must associate with all those words adjacent to it.

== Psychology ==
It is believed that word association can reveal something of a person's subconscious mind (as it shows what things they associate together), but others are skeptical of how effective such a technique could be in psychology.

Often, the game's goal is to compare the first and final word, to see if they relate, or to see how different they are, or also to see how many words are repeated. Likewise, players often review the list of words to see the pathways of associations that go from beginning to end.

Word association has been used by market researchers to ensure the proper message is conveyed by names or adjectives used in promoting a company's products. For example, James Vicary, working in the 1950s, tested the word 'lagered' for a brewing company. While about a third of his subjects associated the word with beer, another third associated it with tiredness, dizziness and so forth. As a result of the study, Vicary's client decided not to use the word.

In the early years of psychology, many doctors noted that patients exhibited behavior that they were not in control of. Some part of the personality seemed to have an influence on that person's behavior that was not in their conscious control. This part was, by function, unconscious, and became so named the Unconscious. Carl Jung theorized that people connect ideas, feelings, experiences and information by way of associations ... that ideas and experiences are linked, or grouped, in the unconscious in such a manner as to exert influence over the individual’s behavior.^{[quote without quotation marks?]} These groupings he named Complexes.

== See also ==
- Implicit Association Test
- iAssociate
- Password
