= NonStop Games =

Video game company

Nonstop Games
- Type: Subsidiary
- Industry: Video games
- Founded: 2011
- Founder: Teemu Ikonen; Henrik Karlström; Juha Paananen; Henric Suuronen
- Headquarters: Singapore,
- Area served: Worldwide
- Key people: Juha Paananen (head of studio)
- Number of employees: ~50
- Parent: King

Nonstop Games was a Singaporean-Finnish games start-up located in Singapore. It was founded in 2011 under the name GamesMadeMe and renamed to NonStop Games in March 2012. The company developed mobile and tablet games for gamers using touch devices.

In August 2014, NonStop Games was bought by King.

In October 2016, King made the decision to shut down NonStop Games.

== History ==
NonStop Games was founded in 2011 by Teemu Ikonen, Henrik Karlström, Juha Paananen and Henric Suuronen. In January 2012, NonStop Games launched its first game, Dollar Isle. In April 2012, their second game, PainStars, was launched. The game's community marked the production of over 500,000 drawings some months after launch and the number of daily pictures painted was close to 30,000. In August 2012, NonStop Games announced a new project under the working title "Games IV". The CEO of the company, Juha Paananen, described it as a "90° shift from their last couple games" and as a "mix of strategy, social collaboration and competition with PVP elements."
