= Fingersoft =

Finnish video game developer

Fingersoft Oy

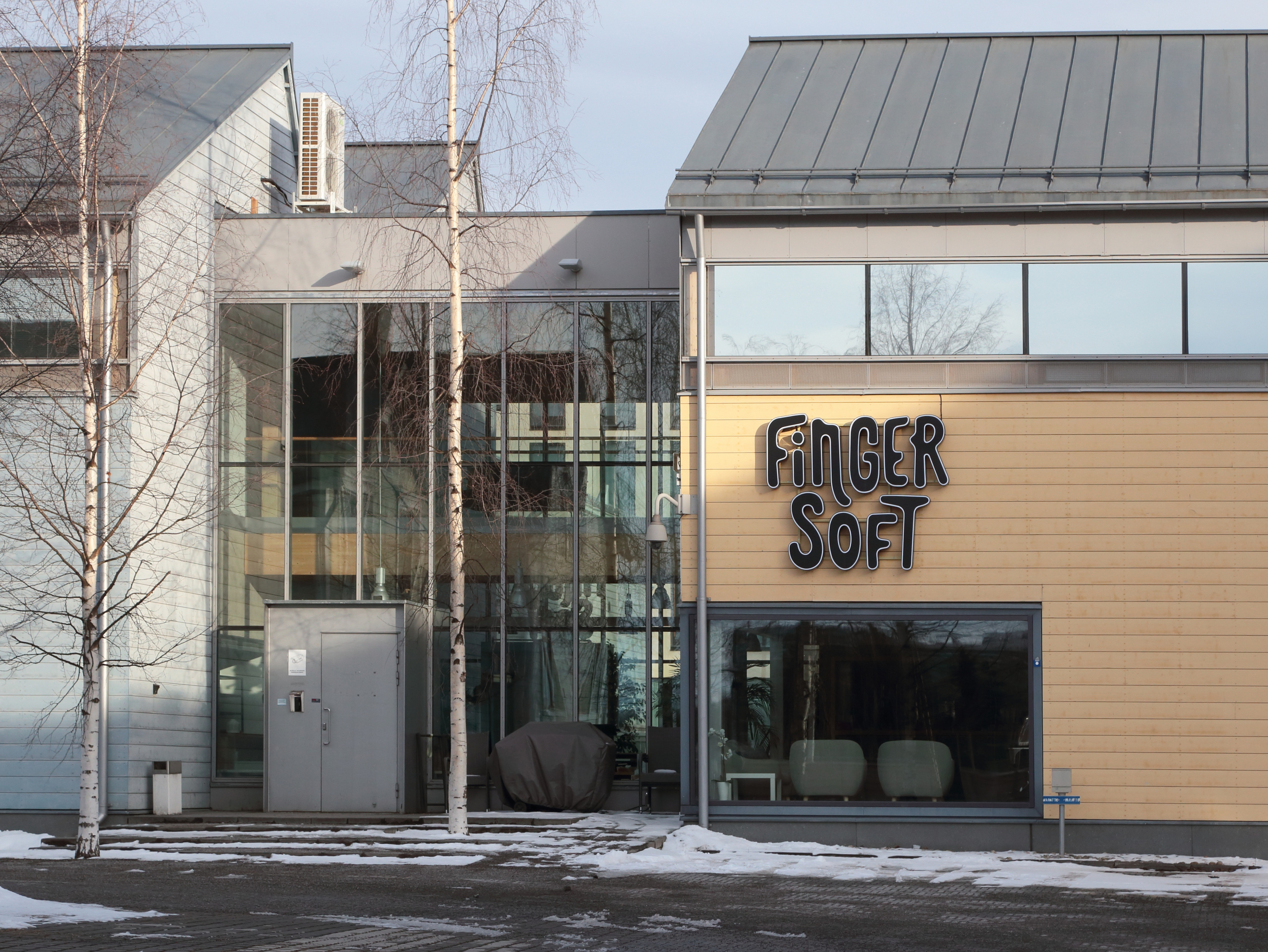
- Fingersoft's headquarters in Oulu, Finland
- Type: Private
- Industry: Video games
- Founded: 2012; 14 years ago
- Founder: Toni Fingerroos
- Headquarters: Oulu, Finland
- Key people: Jaakko Kylmäoja (CEO)
- Products: See § Games
- Revenue: €23.2 million (2022)
- Number of employees: 115 (2023)
- Parent: Finger Group
- Website: fingersoft.com

Fingersoft is a Finnish video game developer based in Oulu. It is best known for the mobile games Hill Climb Racing and Hill Climb Racing 2, which together have over 2 billion installations.

== History ==
In late 2011, Toni Fingerroos started developing mobile applications for Android devices. He established Fingersoft in 2012 together with his girlfriend and Teemu Närhi, who became the company's CEO. In February 2012 he published the Cartoon Camera app, which allowed users to edit their photos to look like sketches or drawings. The app quickly reached 10 million downloads. Fingersoft also published other camera applications that were downloaded tens of millions of times.

Hill Climb Racing, published in September 2012, was born out of testing physics. One month after its Android launch, an iOS version of the game was also published. During the first 12 months, Hill Climb Racing reached over 100 million downloads.

In 2013 Hill Climb Racing was the 10th most downloaded game in the United States and the 7th most downloaded game in the world. In 2014 the company employed 12 people. The company also began publishing games developed by other companies, such as the Fail Hard game by Viima Games Oy, the Pick A Pet mobile game by the Irish company SixMinute and the Benji Bananas game by Tribeflame.

In September 2015, Fingersoft and the construction company Rakennusteho Group bought a city block in downtown Oulu. In 2016 Fingersoft published Hill Climb Racing 2. Fingersoft renovated the premises of the Oulu game campus with Rakennusteho, investing more than 4 million euros in the new premises. Turnover in 2016 was almost 16 million euros.

By the year 2018, games published by Fingersoft had been globally downloaded more than one billion times in total. The company did not publish any new games, but its turnover was 21 million euros.

In 2019 Teemu Närhi voluntarily resigned as CEO and became a programmer at Fingersoft. Celine Pasula started as the CEO in late 2019 but was soon succeeded by Jaakko Kylmäoja in February of 2021.

In early 2020 Fingersoft launched its game on Apple devices in China.

== Organization ==
Fingersoft's parent company is the Finger Group. Fingersoft's operations are divided so that Fingersoft Oy is responsible for operational game development and Hill Climb Racing Oy owns the game's IP. In 2019 Fingersoft employed 55 people.

Fingersoft operates in downtown Oulu on a campus where it has also collected other local game studios. Toni Fingerroos is on the company's Board of Directors.

== Games ==
=== Overview ===
The company has developed the games Hill Climb Racing, Hill Climb Racing 2, Hill Climb Racing 3, and Lego Hill Climb Adventures.

It has also published a now discontinued Fail Hard, Benji Bananas (in some regions) which was developed by TribeFlame Ltd in April 2013, and was later acquired by Animoca Brands.

==== Hill Climb Racing ====
Hill Climb Racing is the first installment in the physics-based mobile racing franchise developed by Finnish studio Fingersoft. Released globally in 2012 and later in China in 2020. The game challenges players to drive a vehicle over uneven terrain while collecting coins and managing fuel, with simple vehicle upgrades available to enhance performance.

Over time, Hill Climb Racing continued to achieve widespread adoption, reaching over 2 billion downloads in January 2026.

==== Hill Climb Racing 2 ====
Hill Climb Racing 2 was officially released in late 2016, following the success of the original Hill Climb Racing. The sequel expanded the physics-based driving gameplay by introducing new vehicles, tracks, and upgrade systems, while retaining the core hill-climbing mechanics that defined the franchise.

The game added a real-time multiplayer mode, allowing players to compete against friends and global opponents, as well as a club system where users could join teams, complete challenges, compete with other teams, and earn rewards collectively. Vehicle customization and upgrades became a central gameplay feature, giving players a variety of ways to improve performance and style.

Within its first two months, Hill Climb Racing 2 reached over 40 million downloads worldwide.

Fingersoft also extended the game to multiple regions, including China, collaborating with MyGamez for local publishing and compliance with regional app store regulations.

Hill Climb Racing 2 continues to be updated regularly with new tracks, vehicles, challenges, and seasonal events, maintaining active engagement among its player base with frequent optimizations to enhance performance and visual quality.

==== Hill Climb Racing 3 ====
Hill Climb Racing 3 is the fourth (after Lego Hill Climb Adventures) installment in the physics‑based mobile racing franchise developed by Finnish studio Fingersoft. The game builds on its predecessors by introducing real‑time multiplayer elements, enhanced visuals, and gadget‑based gameplay.

Development of Hill Climb Racing 3 began around 2020, as part of Fingersoft’s ongoing expansion of the franchise following the long‑running success of the original and its sequel. The new entry introduces real‑time player‑versus‑player racing, updated 3D graphics, and race mechanics compared with earlier games in the series.

In late October 2025, Hill Climb Racing 3 entered a soft launch on Android in select regions, including the United Kingdom, Norway, Sweden, and Finland. This early access phase made the game playable on Google Play while the developer continues balancing gameplay and collecting player feedback prior to a broader release. The soft launch rollout highlights the franchise’s evolution toward competitive online racing alongside its traditional physics‑based segments.

As of early 2026, no official global release date had been announced. Additional regions and platform support are planned following beta tests.

==== Lego Hill Climb Adventures ====
Lego Hill Climb Adventures is a spin-off of the Hill Climb Racing franchise, developed by Fingersoft in collaboration with Lego and released in May 2024 for Android and iOS platforms. The game retains the physics-based driving mechanics of the main series while introducing LEGO-themed vehicles, tracks, and environments, offering a distinct visual style.

The gameplay introduces single-player challenges, with puzzle-like terrain obstacles and level-based progression rather than the multiplayer features seen in Hill Climb Racing 2 and 3. Players can unlock and upgrade various Lego vehicles and experiment with their physics properties to complete levels efficiently.

Lego Hill Climb Adventures was distributed in select regions internationally, with Fingersoft handling publishing and app store support. The game also received periodic updates, including new tracks, vehicles, and Lego-themed content, maintaining ongoing player engagement.

The game is considered a part of the broader Hill Climb franchise, represents a licensed collaboration with Lego consistent with the series' physics-based gameplay.
