= Rule of Rose =

2006 video game

- North American box art
- Developer: Punchline (Note: Additional work by Sony Computer Entertainment Japan)
- Publishers: JP: Sony Computer Entertainment; NA: Atlus USA; EU: 505 Games
- Director: Shuji Ishikawa
- Producer: Noriyuki Boda
- Writers: Tomo Ikeda; Hideki Okuma; Shuji Ichikawa
- Composer: Yutaka Minobe
- Platform: PlayStation 2
- Release: JP: January 19, 2006; NA: September 12, 2006; EU: November 3, 2006
- Genre: Survival horror
- Mode: Single-player

Rule of Rose (Note: Rule of Rose (Japanese: ルールオブローズ, Hepburn: Rūru obu Rōzu)) is a 2006 survival horror video game developed by Punchline and published by Sony Computer Entertainment for the PlayStation 2. Set in Britain in 1930, the plot revolves around a nineteen-year-old woman named Jennifer, who finds herself trapped in a world dominated by young girls who have formed a social hierarchy known as the Red Crayon Aristocrats. The game was published by Atlus USA in North America and 505 Games in Europe.

Development on Rule of Rose began after Punchline was asked by Sony Computer Entertainment to make a horror game. Punchline wanted to develop a "new type of horror game" with an emphasis on psychological horror. This decision led to the concept of childhood, specifically the "mysterious and misunderstood" nature of young girls. The team drew inspiration from the classic Brothers Grimm fairy tales for the narrative, and the Silent Hill series for graphics and art style. The entire score was produced by studio musicians in order to bring a human element to the game's atmosphere.

Rule of Rose was the subject of a moral panic in Europe prior to its publication there, based on rumors of its alleged content. These rumors ranged from erotic themes to obscene brutality. Various European authorities condemned the game and called for its banning. The game was cancelled in the United Kingdom, despite the Video Standards Council calling the complaints "nonsense". Rule of Rose received mixed reviews from critics, with gameplay being criticized the most. The game has been compared to Silent Hill and Haunting Ground, due to the psychological horror elements and the presence of a canine companion for the main character.

Physical copies of Rule of Rose have become highly sought-after collector's items. Prices for pre-owned copies range from around $300 to $800, and some sealed or mint-condition copies can sell for in excess of $1,000.

== Gameplay ==
The player character Jennifer and Brown find themselves surrounded by hostile imps.

Rule of Rose is a survival horror game in which the player guides Jennifer through exploring the game environments and advances the plot by accomplishing tasks while sporadically encountering enemies and bosses.

Described as "essentially an interactive movie" by its director Shuji Ishikawa and associate producer Yuya Takayama, the narrative of Rule of Rose centers on the traumatic childhood memories of Jennifer, "an ordinary, vulnerable girl"; these memories sometimes manifest in exaggerated ways.

Combat is almost exclusively melee-based, with a variety of improvised weapons available, such as kitchen knives and pipes. Jennifer is a timid character: her melee attacks are neither powerful nor long-ranged. Evasion of enemies is often a more viable strategy instead of fighting. With the exception of a handful of bosses, all enemies in the game are imps—skinny, doll-like creatures the size of small children. Different animal-headed imps appear throughout the game, alongside regular imps.

Every level of the game takes place over a month. Each chapter begins with the reading of a homemade storybook related to the plot of the chapter. During each level, Jennifer is tasked with finding a specific object that will be gifted to the Aristocracy.

Early in the game, Jennifer encounters and rescues a dog named Brown. Brown accompanies her throughout the game and responds to the player's commands. Brown can be ordered to track items by scent, be commanded to 'stay' and be called to Jennifer's side. Brown cannot attack enemies, but will growl to distract some imps and bosses, allowing Jennifer to retreat or attack without fear of retaliation. He can be injured to the point of collapse, causing him to stop distracting enemies or track items.

Brown's ability to locate items is an integral part of the game, and is used in almost every chapter to progress further. The same system allows the player to find health restoratives and other items which, while not essential to complete the game, can help the player survive enemy encounters. Players select an item from the inventory for Brown to locate, which is then connected to the 'find' command until changed or removed. Every item selected this way can be used to find at least one type of item. When tracking items, Brown will lead the player through the game environments, scratching at doors in his way, signaling the player to open the door. Most health restoratives and all tradable items are hidden and must be uncovered by Brown, though the player can choose to avoid searching for these items to progress quickly. Restorative items include snack foods, candy, and chocolate. The different types of restorative items heal varying amounts of health. Bones and other items can be used to restore Brown's health if he becomes injured. Other items such as marbles and ribbons have no immediate use, but may be traded with non-playable characters in order to obtain food, rare items, and weapons.

Most levels are puzzle based. The primary puzzles require the use of Brown's scent-finding ability in order to find objects that are related to one another in order to solve a larger puzzle. Others require finding markings on the wall in order to solve the chapter's puzzle. The game is largely linear and the player cannot affect the story through their actions, although they are rewarded for exploration with secret items, additional details and combat upgrades.

== Plot ==
On a night bus ride, 19-year-old Jennifer is given an unfinished storybook by a mysterious boy, but he runs away before she can return it. While following him to the dilapidated Rose Garden Orphanage, she finds a dog collar, and witnesses masked children in the orphanage beating a bloody sack. Jennifer infiltrates the orphanage and a funeral is announced, which the boy claims is for her "dear friend". Jennifer arrives after the funeral, and unearths the coffin to find the bloody sack inside, but the masked orphans attack and force her into the coffin, taking her onto an airship. She wakes up as the captive of the mysterious boy, who introduces himself as the Prince of the Red Rose. She is forcibly inducted as the lowest ranked member of the Red Rose Aristocracy, which requires monthly gifts given at an altar as tithes for the Prince and Princess of the Red Rose. Failure to provide an adequate gift will lead to humiliation and punishment. The Prince then gives Jennifer several handmade, surreal storybooks to help recover her lost memories and a forgotten oath she had made. He then releases her to participate in club activities. Each of the storybook's contents directly reflect a month of the club's activities, and Jennifer frequently suffers cruel punishment rituals for incidents caused by higher-ranking members. She manages to rescue a yellow Labrador named Brown, who accompanies her. She also befriends the other lower-class members, Amanda and Wendy, who warn her about a monster called Stray Dog that eats children. Jennifer also earns a promotion to the second lowest rank, which requires demoting Amanda in her place and taking part in the punishment ritual against her.

After finishing all of the storybooks and through them recalling part of the oath she had made, Jennifer is kidnapped from the airship by a suicidal man named Gregory, and is left alone in a rose garden. Jennifer follows him into the basement of his nearby home, where she is trapped. She discovers a stuffed bear, more handmade storybooks, and letters between Wendy and a boy named Joshua, who address each other as "Princess" and "Prince" respectively. Wendy appears at the basement window and rescues Jennifer, and also steals Gregory's gun to prevent him from committing suicide. Before re-boarding the airship from the rose garden, Wendy trades Jennifer a rose-shaped brooch for the stuffed bear, and names it Joshua.

Back on the airship, the club is in a state of emergency trying to find the stolen stuffed bear, which acts as their Prince. They promise a red crayon, which is a token of membership in the Aristocracy, to anyone who finds the bear. Jennifer recovers the bear from Amanda, but when Jennifer presents the bear at the altar, she learns that Amanda has framed her for stealing it out of jealousy for having been demoted earlier. The Aristocrats brutally attack Jennifer, and Jennifer wakes up back at the orphanage with a broken red crayon. All the Aristocrats from the airship are present, but they all either ignore or harass her, except for Wendy, who is the sole orphan that remains friendly towards her. After informing Jennifer of an important club meeting, both Wendy and Brown disappear. Jennifer learns from the other orphans harassing her that herself and Brown are wanted as the monthly gift. In an attempt to rescue Brown, she follows a bloody trail to the attic and discovers Brown's corpse within the bloody sack at the club altar. The Aristocrats emerge to taunt Jennifer, and Wendy reveals that she is the Princess of the Red Rose and had ordered both the torment against Jennifer and Brown's death. Outraged, Jennifer slaps Wendy and throws away her brooch. She denounces the Aristocrats and herself for not standing up to them. Wendy runs away from the orphanage in a humiliated rage.

Without a leader, and abandoned by any adults in charge, the Aristocrats elect Jennifer as their new Princess. Before she can decline, the orphans see Wendy outside and leave to chase her away. Shortly afterward, Jennifer hears their screams and follows them outside, where the missing Prince is leading Stray Dog and killing the Aristocrats. The Prince reveals to Jennifer than he is actually Wendy in disguise, and she admits to Jennifer that in order to get revenge, Wendy conspired to make the story of Stray Dog come true, and forced Gregory to become it by pretending to be his son, Joshua, in order to manipulate him to massacre all of the orphans. Distressed by the reality of her actions, she gives Jennifer the stolen gun so she can stop Gregory, and is then killed. When Gregory sees Jennifer, he asks 'Joshua' to give him the gun, and shoots himself instead.

Jennifer once more awakens as her child self, and realizes that all the events that occurred were her lost and distorted memories of her childhood. In reality, before meeting Wendy, Jennifer was kidnapped from an airship wreck by Gregory and made to live as a boy in order to replace his son, Joshua, who died from illness. Wendy discovered Jennifer living as 'Joshua', and the pair formed a pseudo-romance. She rescued and brought Jennifer to the orphanage for companionship and together formed the Red Crayon Aristocrats. Jennifer was made the Prince, and Wendy became the Princess. They made a loyalty oath to each other, and exchanged Jennifer's bear for Wendy's brooch as proof of their promise. Later, Jennifer adopted a puppy she named Brown and started to neglect club duties to care for him. Wendy became deeply jealous of Jennifer's love for Brown, and demoted Jennifer from the position of Prince, replacing her with the stuffed bear and setting in motion her manipulation of Gregory, Brown's death and the massacre of the orphans.

The media quickly abandoned the massacre story after realizing Jennifer was the only survivor of the airship wreck, leaving the orphans forgotten by the world. As Jennifer (now through the eyes of her young self) does one final walkthrough of the orphanage, she makes peace with her past and her trauma while visiting every room in the orphanage, understanding that they were children and that she was just too weak back then. She sees a manifest of Wendy outside, gives her a kiss, and leaves her behind, locking the gate as Wendy begs her to never forget her. Jennifer sees Gregory waiting by the bus, writing a story for his son who is waiting for him at home. Lastly, within her memories, Jennifer locates puppy Brown inside the shed, gives him the collar she found bearing his name, and inscribes her oath on a chalkboard. Vowing to protect her memories, she leaves the shed and locks the door behind her, finally coming to terms with her trauma and past.

== Development ==
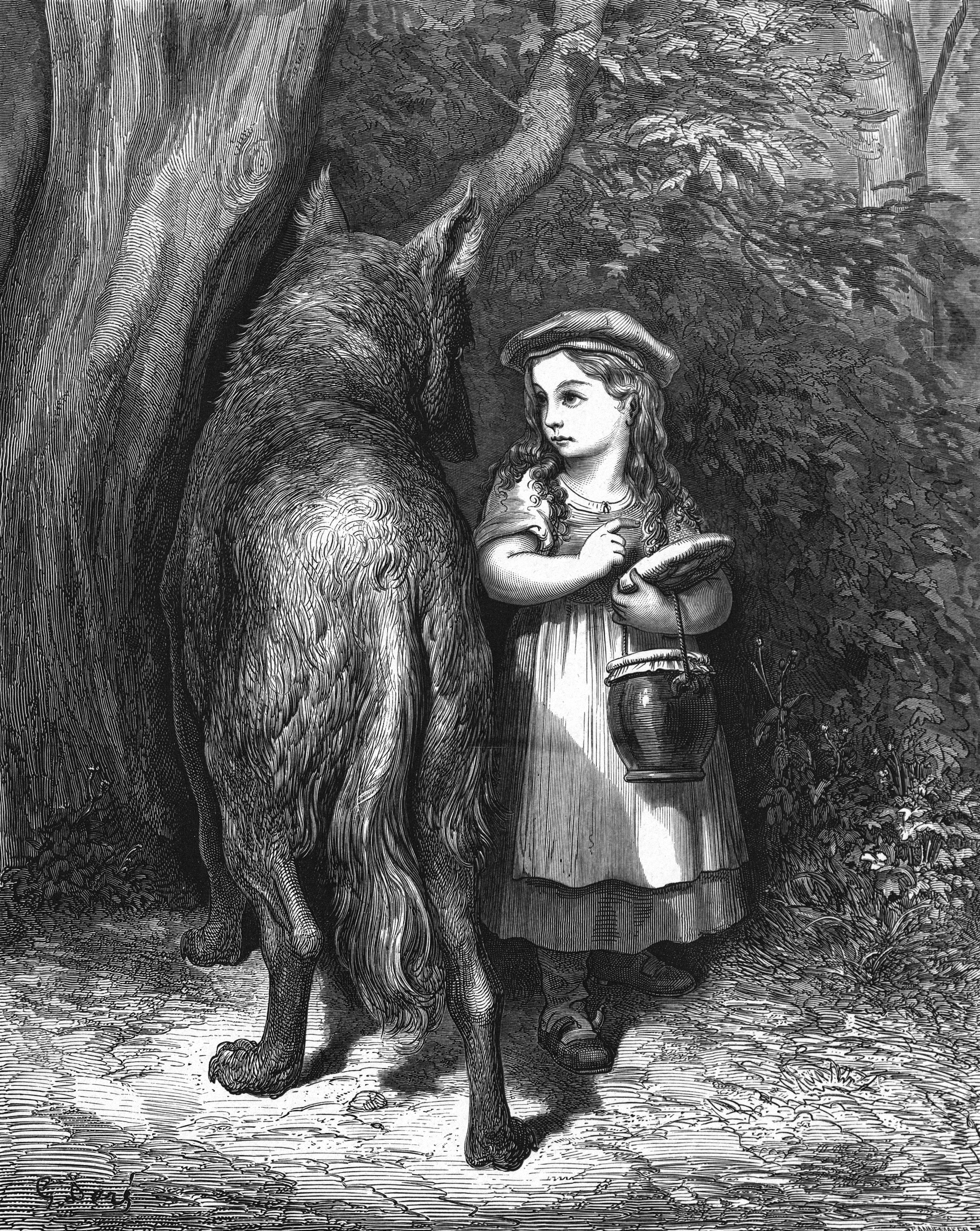
For inspiration, Punchline drew on the cruelty found in fairy tales by the Brothers Grimm and Edward Gorey.

The company Punchline, which had previously developed the video game Chulip, developed Rule of Rose for the PlayStation 2. A group of twenty-five developers, Punchline began the project after being asked by Sony Computer Entertainment to develop a horror video game; not wanting to create a game similar to the survival-horror series Resident Evil, Punchline decided on the goal of developing a "new type of horror game, one which wasn't the usual zombie, ghost and slasher type," with an emphasis on psychological horror rather than "surprise- and shock-based horror." A proposed early draft by Yoshiro Kimura was a dark fantasy "boy's story" that centered on a boy abducted by "a big man" and his attempts to escape, while encountering the ghosts of previous victims. Keywords included "Kidnapping, imprisonment, children, bullying, dwarfs, airship, escape." This concept was turned down by the publisher on the basis of being "too dangerous a topic," and Kimura turned to the idea of examining the "fear between girls."

This decision led to the concept of "a game surrounding childhood and children," but from both viewpoints to show how children and adults can find the other one terrifying, with a primary focus on the adult's perspective. Though the game has garnered comparisons with William Golding's 1954 allegorical novel Lord of the Flies, the developers did not draw inspiration from it, instead focusing on the "mysterious and misunderstood" nature of girls. The team visited Hyde Park for the accuracy of details such as the garden in the opening scene, and sought assistance from the British government and archives to gather information about the R101 airship that influenced the setting of the story. They ensured accurate architectural details due to Ishikawa's expertise. The story formed through trial and error as the developers figured out how to create a sense of fear, ultimately adding the children's secret society, the Red Crayon Aristocrats. They also included Brown as a way to balance Jennifer's "helpless and unhappy" personality and make the game more enjoyable. Because of budget and time problems, the combat system was left a little rough.

Rule of Rose's graphics are heavily stylized, incorporating a series of visual filters similar to those used in the Silent Hill series. The developers researched the behavior of children, monitoring a group of European and American children, and photographed references for "the game's textures and models"; for the motion capture, the team had Japanese children act. At the request of the developers, the group of children also expressed through drawings or written words what caused them to be happy or afraid. The company Shirogumi worked on the computer-generated imagery present in Rule of Rose's cutscenes. The musical score was composed by Yutaka Minobe, who also co-composed the music of Skies of Arcadia and some tracks from the Panzer Dragoon Orta soundtrack. The entire score was produced by studio musicians, including the Hiroshi Murayama Trio, and vocals by Kaori Kondo. According to the game's developers, the music was intended to bring a human element to the atmosphere in the game. A 6-track promotional soundtrack CD was produced by Atlus, which was issued to customers from certain retailers when Rule of Rose was pre-ordered.

Punchline included several themes in Rule of Rose, with the primary one being "intimate relationships between all people". A major theme in the game is the difference between a child's and an adult's way of thinking, and how children might treat adults if they were given power over them. Players are helpless to prevent their adult player character from being bullied by the children. Another theme is how attachment "to one thing can bring out the worst in people."

== Controversy ==
Prior to its publication, Rule of Rose was the subject of a moral panic in Europe. At E3 2006, Atlus announced that it would be releasing Rule of Rose in the United States, following Sony's decision to pass on an American release, as the game "wasn't really in sync with their corporate image" and the company had wanted the game to "be a bit tamer, if it were to have the Sony name in the U.S." The developers disagreed with this, saying that "the theme is supposed to be one of intimate familiarity" and that they had intended to portray how children behave "without the filter of guilt or sin." Rumors of violence towards children in the game tied into a larger discussion of morality and violence in video games appeared in the Italian magazine Panorama in November 2006, and were quickly picked up by the British media, which alleged that the game had scenes of "children buried alive underground, in-game sadomasochism, and underage eroticism." These allegations were untrue. At the time, Rule of Rose had already been rated by various video game advisory boards as suitable for an older teenage audience: in Japan, it was rated 15+; in the majority of Europe, 16+; and in North America, 17+.

European Commissioner for Justice, Freedom and Security Franco Frattini attacked the game as containing "obscene cruelty and brutality". He also called for changes to the PEGI rating system in place across Europe and for government officials to engage in discussions with industry representatives. Frattini received a letter from Viviane Reding, commissioner for the information society and media, who criticized his actions: "It is...very unfortunate that my services were not pre-consulted before your letter to the Ministers of Interior was sent out," reminding him of the commission-backed self-regulating ratings system called PEGI that has operated across the European Union since 2003. The PEGI system of classification, according to Reding's letter, offers "informed adult choice" without censoring content: "This is in line with the Commission's view that measures taken to protect minors and human dignity must be carefully balanced with the fundamental right to freedom of expression as laid down in the Charter on Fundamental Rights of the European Union." On March 7, 2007, a group of MEPs presented a motion for a European Parliament resolution on a ban on the sale and distribution of the game in Europe, along with the creation of a "European Observatory on childhood and minors to be set up to preventively monitor video game content and define a single code of conduct for the sale and distribution of children's video games." It was also proposed that the game be prohibited from being sold in France as part of an amendment presented by Député Bernard Depierre in the French Parliament, while the Deputy Minister of National Education in Poland, Mirosław Orzechowski, sought to prevent the game from being disseminated by submitting a report to the district prosecutor's office in Śródmieście, Warsaw, although he did not specify which article of the Polish Penal Code was allegedly being violated. At this time, the game had not yet been released in Europe; the public officials suggesting that Rule of Rose be banned had not actually played the game, but had only read about its alleged content or watched the trailer.

505 Games' Australian distributor, Red-Ant, cancelled the game's Australian and New Zealand release, and 505 Games later cancelled the United Kingdom release as a result of complaints by Frattini and other EU officials, and "largely misleading" commentary from the British press, although review copies had already shipped to video game journalists. It was released in the rest of Europe. The Video Standards Council, the British body which had granted the title its 16+ PEGI rating, defended their decision. In response to the press and Frattini's comments, the VSC's Secretary-General, Laurie Hall, stated: "I have no idea where the suggestion of in-game sadomasochism has come from, nor children being buried underground. These are things that have been completely made up. [...] We're not worried about our integrity being called into question, because Mr Frattini's quotes are nonsense." The Council further noted that "there isn't any underage eroticism. And the most violent scene does indeed see one of the young girls scare Jennifer with a rat on a stick. But the rat's actually quite placid towards her and even licks her face."

== Reception ==
Reception

Aggregate score
Aggregator	Score
Metacritic	59/100

Review scores
Publication	Score
Edge	3/10
Electronic Gaming Monthly	4.5/10
Famitsu	28/40
Game Informer	6.25/10
GamePro	3.25/5
GameRevolution	D+
GameSpot	6/10
GameSpy	3/5 stars
GameTrailers	5.9/10
GameZone	5.9/10
IGN	4.9/10
Official U.S. PlayStation Magazine	4/10
The A.V. Club	B

The game received "mixed or average" reviews, according to video game review aggregator website Metacritic. The reviewer for video game magazine Play wrote: "I think everyone should experience this game, especially horror fans, but in order to do so, you're going to have to suffer through times of sheer agony—just like poor, unlucky Jennifer." According to Official UK PlayStation 2 Magazine, the game "[b]lends the stuff of nightmares with stylish sound and graphics. Sadly, the developer should have spent longer on the gameplay." Edge found neither plot nor gameplay appealing: "It's just a murky brew of meaningless, exploitative dysfunction filling an empty game, and it leaves a bitter taste."

It is generally agreed that the title has an interesting plot, with The A.V. Club observing that "aside from a few deep curtsies and an unlockable Gothic Lolita costume, the characters are more sinister than sexualised". However, the gameplay is widely lambasted as clumsy, archaic, and unrewarding. The press was generally divided upon how much the gameplay detracts from one's ability to enjoy the story itself. GamesRadar described Jennifer as "a cringing, passive non-entity" and stated: "There's no denying that Rule of Rose is extremely pretty, atmospheric and disturbing.... but as an adventure game, Rule of Rose just sort of wilts."

In a retrospective article on survival horror games, GamePro's Michael Cherdchupan listed Rule of Rose as one of the classics of the genre, writing that the game was a work of art that lingered long after playing through; he praised it for its delicate handling of its subject matter and Jennifer's journey as she processes her trauma. IGN listed Rule of Rose as one of the worst horror games created after 2000. While enjoying the "refreshingly adult take on sexual awakening and repressed memories that's consistently unsettling without ever resorting to cheap shock tactics," it criticized the game's "totally broken" combat and "thoroughly excruciating" backtracking, controls, and camera angles.

Because of the limited number of copies published, Rule of Rose has garnered a reputation as one of the more expensive video games to buy second-hand.

== Legacy ==
In 2021, Tokyo indie game developer Onion Games expressed interest in remastering Rule of Rose. Although they "can't guarantee that any of these initiatives will have more than a 1% chance of happening", they would like to give it a try after remastering a previous title for the Nintendo Switch called Moon.
