= LOL (video game) =

2007 Nintendo DS video game

LOL: Never Party Alone!
- North American box art
- Developers: Route24; Skip Ltd.
- Publishers: JP: Skip Ltd.; NA: Agetec; EU: Rising Star Games
- Designer: Kenichi Nishi
- Composer: Hirofumi Taniguchi
- Platform: Nintendo DS
- Release: JP: July 19, 2007; NA: May 30, 2008; EU: July 4, 2008
- Genre: Party
- Mode: Multiplayer

LOL (full title: LOL: Never Party Alone!), known in Europe as Bakushow and in Japan as Archime DS (アルキメＤＳ, Arukime DS), is a party video game developed by Route24 and Skip Ltd. for the Nintendo DS and published by Skip Ltd. in Japan, Agetec in North America, and Rising Star Games in Europe. Developed by a group of five people headed by Kenichi Nishi, it is a multiplayer game implemented with a PictoChat-like interface in which a host player asks a question, requiring others to write or draw their answers on the DS touchscreen. The developers refer to LOL as a "comedy-training" game with the tagline of the game being "If you think this game is boring, you are boring." LOL received largely mixed reviews by critics upon its release.

== Gameplay ==
After players present their answers, each one votes on their favorite answer(s).

The gameplay of LOL is centered around being as "imaginative, clever and amusing with your friends as possible". The game is multiplayer only, requiring between two and four players to participate. Although each player must have their own Nintendo DS, only one copy of the game is needed. In the game the host asks a question or tell the others to draw something and all the players have to write or draw that which is asked within a time limit. For example, the host may ask the players "What does M.B.E. stand for?" or "Why the heck are we playing this game?"

A copy tool can then be used by the host to begin drawing or writing something, allowing the other players to finish the partially drawn image or written word as their answers. After all players have answered, each player votes on which answer or image is the funniest. Each player has three votes and can also vote once for themselves. There is no penalty for voting for oneself.

== Development ==
LOL was developed by a group of five people at Route24. The game was designed by former Skip vice president Kenichi Nishi, best known for directing Giftpia and Chibi-Robo!, and, before these, the similarly-named (but unrelated) L.O.L. Lack of love. LOL was programmed by Fumihiro Kanaya, who worked on two of Skip's bit Generations titles. The game's artwork was done by hikarin and its music was composed by Hirofumi Taniguchi. The game was made under a very low budget without the staff being paid for it, apart from their regular jobs. Their goal was to make the game as simple as possible.

Nishi announced in 2004 that he and Skip were working on a game for the Nintendo DS, but shortly thereafter retracted the statement. It is unknown if LOL was the project. In April 2006, Nishi announced the game under the working title "LOL DS", which was officially titled Archime DS in Japan one year later. The Japanese title of the game comes from Archimedes, a Greek mathematician. The localized versions of the game are almost identical to the original Japanese version, with only the menu text and voices of the game's onscreen characters being changed. In North America, the game was initially sold exclusively through Agetec's website.

== Reception ==
Reception

Aggregate score
Aggregator	Score
Metacritic	56 out of 100

Review scores
Publication	Score
Eurogamer	2 out of 10
Game Informer	1 out of 10
GamesTM	7 out of 10
GameZone	7.3 out of 10
IGN	7.5 out of 10
NGamer	60%
Official Nintendo Magazine	80%
Pocket Gamer	2.5/5
411Mania	5.5 out of 10

LOL received "mixed or average" reviews according to the review aggregation website Metacritic. IGN positively noted, "What LOL offers is very simple, but it has the potential to be very entertaining." GamePro also found the game enjoyable, but admitted that it became somewhat monotonous after a certain amount of time. (Note: GamePro gave the game 3/5 for graphics, 2.5/5 for sound, 3.5/5 for control, and 4/5 for fun factor.) Official Nintendo Magazine called it "the very definition of a cheap and cheerful game—perfect for those whose wit is as sharp as their stylus."

Other publications were very critical of the game, many of which agreed that the game offered very little despite its budget price. Eurogamer questioned why players would spend money on it when PictoChat exists for free. Game Informer exclaimed, "Congratulations, you just spent $20 on 10 minutes of gameplay!" They also claimed "This game is already available for free on any DS. It's called PictoChat." The Norwegian newspaper Dagbladet was so disappointed with the game that they gave it the lowest score available and threw the game cartridge into a microwave oven, destroying it.

The game was a nominee for "Best Local Multiplayer Game" by IGN in its 2008 video game awards.
