= Incredible Crisis =

1999 video game

- North American cover art
- Developer: Polygon Magic
- Publishers: PlayStation: JP: Tokuma Shoten; NA/EU: Titus Interactive; Arcade: JP: Tecmo
- Director: Takayuki Watanabe
- Designers: Kenichi Nishi; Takayuki Watanabe
- Composer: Tokyo Ska Paradise Orchestra
- Platforms: PlayStation; Arcade
- Release: Arcade: JP: 1999; PlayStation: JP: June 24, 1999; NA: November 6, 2000; EU: November 24, 2000
- Genre: Action
- Mode: Single-player

Incredible Crisis, known in Japan as Tondemo Crisis! (とんでもクライシス!, Tondemo Kuraishisu!; "Outrageous Crisis!"), is a PlayStation video game developed by Polygon Magic. The game was published in Japan by Tokuma Shoten on June 24, 1999. Translated versions were released by Titus Interactive in North America and Europe throughout November 2000.

Incredible Crisis follows four members of a working-class Japanese family on their bizarre adventures from their daily routines while trying to get home early for the family's grandmother's birthday. The game consists of several action-oriented minigames strung together and book-ended with pre-rendered cutscenes. The game was directed by Takayuki Watanabe, who designed and scripted the game with Kenichi Nishi, and features music from the Tokyo Ska Paradise Orchestra.

== Gameplay ==
Incredible Crisis consists of 24 levels (26 in the Japanese version) spread over four main parts, with each part focusing on one of the four members of the Tanamatsuri family: Taneo, Etsuko, Tsuyoshi, and Ririka. Each level revolves around a minigame, some of which are repeated, which the player must clear in order to proceed. These games range from action-based objectives such as dodging obstacles and rhythm games, to puzzle-based objectives such as answering a quiz and finding items that are on sale. Each of these levels has a stress meter that represents how close the player is to failing the level objective which, depending on the minigame, fills from either making mistakes, drawing closer to a pursuing obstacle, or running out of time. A life is lost if the meter becomes completely full, with extra lives earned by performing well after each individual chapter. Minigames that have been played in the main story can be replayed from the main menu.

== Plot ==
At the Tanamatsuri home, it is grandmother Hatsu's birthday. She wants everyone home early for her special day: the day that serves as a reminder that she has been alive for more years than she can remember. However, her family has completely forgotten to make up last-minute birthday promises to Hatsu. The game begins like any other normal day for the family members - father Taneo, mother Etsuko, daughter Ririka, and son Tsuyoshi - until strings of events stand as obstacles in their way of returning to Hatsu's with the presents.

Taneo dancing with his peers.

The first chapter revolves around father Taneo, who is working in his office when suddenly he is ordered to dance by his supervisor along with his peers. After doing so in quite a frenzy, his co-workers then run off seemingly in fear of something. Taneo turns around to investigate, when he sees a giant boulder-like statue part (which was being placed onto a statue nearby, but accidentally came off) come crashing through the wall; and is forced to run down corridors from it, until he reaches the safety of an elevator which he uses to descend. The boulder comes crashing from above, shooting debris down while Taneo desperately works on activating an emergency stop. Eventually, the boulder also shoots down onto the elevator, and in an explosion, Taneo is shot out of the window. Falling to certain death, Taneo luckily grabs onto a flagpole - but it cannot take his weight, and thus Taneo falls once more; various things slow his descent, and he lands safely. The boulder emerges again through the building's main entrance, but he easily evades it - not long after though, a piece of the statue which was holding the flagpole lands on his head, knocking him unconscious. He later wakes up in an ambulance, strapped to a stretcher while the paramedics ask him questions to check his thinking state. After answering the questions correctly, they accidentally send Taneo - still strapped to the stretcher - out of the ambulance and into the traffic, due to their over-excitement. However, Taneo successfully dodges the traffic and breaks free of his restraints; but when he does so, he crashes into the boulder from before (which miraculously appears). When he recovers, he is helped by an attractive lady, who soon leaves him. Taneo, seemingly in love, follows her onto a Ferris wheel and gives her an erotic back-massage. Afterwards, she suddenly jumps from the Ferris wheel and onto a helicopter, before pointing out she left a bomb behind Taneo. The bomb explodes, sending Taneo onto the helicopter. Soon he makes it off and sees a UFO, which two navy ships are trying to destroy. However, Taneo commandeers a turret and shoots down their missiles, saving the UFO. Eventually, Taneo himself is shot upon by a missile, exploding the turret and sending him high into the sky - but somehow lands safely and gets onto a boat. He gets curious about a block on the boat and removes it, which unwittingly starts sinking the boat. Taneo and the boat owner successfully block the hole and return to shore, where Taneo decides to take the subway. Once boarding the train, he finds it strangely empty, and the attractive woman from before appears, revealing she has cut the brakes of the train. The train crashes into obstacles on the tracks and finally bursts out of the tunnel, depositing Taneo right outside Hatsu's house.

The second chapter focuses on mother Etsuko, who is out buying ingredients for Hatsu's birthday dinner. She goes to the bank, but finds a robbery underway, and nearly manages to sneak away but is noticed at the last minute. The bank robbers choose Etsuko to investigate the vault, and she is ordered to take a golden piggy bank, which she finds booby-trapped and thus must replace its weight using her groceries. She gives the piggy bank to her captors, whose leader, who reveals herself to be the beautiful lady Taneo would chase after, forces her to open it by inputting musical commands which two of the bank robbers demonstrate. The piggy bank opens and transforms into a device that shoots lasers. Etsuko manages to remove its head using her groceries, causing it to explode and launch her and the robbers through the back wall of the bank and out into the snow. They attempt to shoot Etsuko, but she manages to outrun them by snowboard, then falls into a gorge. Sometime later, Etsuko awakens in a secret military air jet hangar, where she decides to pilot a jet to get back home. After take off, she discovers that a giant bear, with a tag saying "Ririka" attached to it, destroying the city. Piloting the last remaining jet, Etsuko must shoot the bear down. After its defeat, she returns to Hatsu's house to prepare sukiyaki for dinner.

The third chapter features son Tsuyoshi, who is out reading in a park. To his amazement, he witnesses a teddy bear grow to giant size not too far away (the same bear that Etsuko encountered) which gives off pink rays - one of which comes into contact with Tsuyoshi and shrinks him to miniature size. He must then run away from a ravenous antlion while avoiding mudslides, then escape a spider's web, and following an encounter with the unfortunate boat owner who helped Taneo earlier - in which Tsuyoshi, too, unplugs the block and nearly causes the boat to sink - he has to escape pursuit from a praying mantis, after which a friendly ant leads him through a series of underground tunnels straight to Hatsu's backyard.

The Tanamatsuri family: Ririka, Etsuko, Hatsu, Taneo, and Tsuyoshi.

The final chapter is told from the perspective of daughter Ririka, who is in class at her private girls' school. While in homeroom, her friend tells her about a new store. Wanting to go there, Ririka makes her classmates switch seats (causing many of them to be knocked out by chalk thrown by the teacher) so she can get to the exit. Riding the subway to Shibuya, she unknowingly comes across the leader of the criminals who would rob the bank where Etsuko was, and later set up Taneo for the fall. She reaches the store and buys four items on sale. When Ririka leaves to return to school, she spots a "take a picture on a bear" photo machine outside a toy store. While she's getting ready to have hers taken, a tiny UFO appears in front of her, upsetting her and causing her picture to be printed on the teddy bear with an angry frown. Ririka yells at the UFO and tries to capture it, but it shoots beams that cause different things to shrink or grow at random, one hitting the teddy bear dispensed out of the machine. It starts growing while Ririka chases the small UFO into a karaoke parlor, where her friend calls her to join them, starting a karaoke sequence (removed from the English version). Ririka then chases the UFO outside, and past a big TV screen where she grabs the UFO. After seeing the mothership on the news on the screen, she calls Taneo and tells him to shoot the missiles heading for the mothership after threatening to never clean her room again. After Taneo agrees, Ririka goes to the screen and plays a game of Simon Says by pressing the colors on the small UFO matching the flashing colors of the mothership, interrupted by a "Please Wait" sign and a news story of the giant teddy bear attacking Tokyo, the bank robbery Etsuko witnessed, and the big boulder, with Ririka's teacher throwing chalk at it. She arrives at a bay and rides the boat that her brother and dad rode, also almost sinking it. After Ririka gets to her destination (and the UFO shrinks the boat, leading to its owner's encounter with Tsuyoshi), she takes a delivery bike leaning against a wall and rides away from a crane/bulldozer operated by the bank robbers and their leader. Managing to outrun the criminals, who meet their fate as the crane runs off the road into the water, Ririka and her bike are lifted into the sky into the mothership (silhouetted briefly against the moon in homage to E.T. The Extra-Terrestrial) and deposited in front of her house, surprising Hatsu for the last time.

== Development ==
Incredible Crisis was developed by Polygon Magic. The design and script was done by Kenichi Nishi, a director at Love-de-Lic and future co-founder of Skip Ltd. known for his unconventional approach to game production. The game's art director was Naozumi Yamaguchi, a former Human Entertainment employee who would later go on to work with Sega on projects such as Phantasy Star Universe.

Titus Interactive acquired the rights to publish the game abroad, and introduced it as their only PlayStation title at the Electronic Entertainment Expo in 2000. Virgin Interactive obtained exclusive rights to distribute the game in Europe. Two minigames, which involve bomb disarming and karaoke respectively, were removed from the localized release of the game, reportedly because they relied too much on kanji and Japanese language, making them difficult to translate. The game's musical score was composed by the Tokyo Ska Paradise Orchestra. A CD titled Tondemo Crisis! Original Soundtrack, featuring 25 songs from the game, was released in Japan by Avex Trax on July 23, 1999.

== Reception ==
Reception

Aggregate score
Aggregator	Score
Metacritic	80/100

Review scores
Publication	Score
AllGame	4/5
Edge	4/10
Electronic Gaming Monthly	7/10
EP Daily	7/10
Famitsu	29/40
Game Informer	6.5/10
GameFan	(G.N.) 79% 78% (Note: In GameFan's viewpoint of the Japanese import, three critics gave it each a score of 75, 84, and 74.)
GamePro	4/5
GameRevolution	C+
GameSpot	7.6/10
IGN	8.5/10
Next Generation	3/5
Official U.S. PlayStation Magazine	3.5/5

According to Media Create sales records, the PlayStation version sold 70,760 units by the end of 1999, making it the 184th best-selling video game in Japan for that year. Also, Famitsu gave it a score of 29 out of 40. Elsewhere, the same console version received "favorable" reviews according to the review aggregation website Metacritic. Eric Bratcher of NextGen said of the game, "It doesn't last long, but everyone on the planet should play Incredible Crisis at least once."

The PlayStation version was a runner-up for GameSpot's annual "Best Game Story" and "Best Puzzle Game" awards among console games. It won the award for "Best Other Game" in both Editors' and Readers' Choice at IGN's Best of 2000 Awards, and was a runner-up for Story. The game was also nominated for the "Most Innovative Game of the Year" and "Game with the Most Laughs" awards at The Electric Playground's Blister Awards 2000, both of which went to Jet Grind Radio and Samba de Amigo, respectively.

Jess Ragan of 1Up.com, in his retroactive review, felt that the game, for its time, was an innovative introduction to mini-game compilation titles. "Incredible Crisis was an important first step for this new genre of games," Ragan stated. "But even with its wacky situations and hyperactive ska music, it's been badly outclassed by Nintendo's Wario Ware series."
