= L.O.L.: Lack of Love =

2000 video game

- Japanese Dreamcast cover art
- Developer: Love-de-Lic
- Publisher: ASCII Corporation
- Director: Kenichi Nishi
- Producer: Hiroshi Suzuki
- Designers: Keita Etō; Hiroaki Ishibashi
- Writer: Kenichi Nishi
- Composer: Ryuichi Sakamoto
- Platform: Dreamcast
- Release: JP: November 2, 2000
- Genre: Life simulation
- Mode: Single-player

L.O.L: Lack Of Love is an evolutionary life simulation game developed by Love-de-Lic and published by ASCII Corporation for the Sega Dreamcast. The game was released only in Japan on November 2, 2000. The game was never localized for western territories but it received a fan translation in 2020.

== Gameplay ==
The player creature and sparse HUD, including mini-map

The gameplay of L.O.L.: Lack of Love revolves around the player's control of a single creature placed on an alien planet during robotic terraforming. The player must cause the creature to metamorphose into new forms by communicating with other living creatures, establishing symbiotic relationships with them, and thus helping them. The game lacks a HUD almost entirely and requires the player to simply remain alive. This can be done by helping, or eating other creatures, as well as performing various bodily functions including sleeping and urinating.

== Development ==
L.O.L.: Lack of Love is the last in a trio of games developed by Love-de-Lic after Moon: Remix RPG Adventure and UFO: A Day in the Life. It was directed by Kenichi Nishi and produced by Hiroshi Suzuki. The game was designed by Keita Eto and Yoshiro Kimura, the latter of whom had already left Love-de-Lic and began working on other projects with his company Punchline. The musical score for L.O.L.: Lack of Love was created by film composer Ryuichi Sakamoto, who was also the game's scenario writer. Nishi and Sakamoto met at Club Eden via a mutual friend and, through a series of e-mails, began discussing James Lovelock’s Gaia hypothesis. This theory states that the earth's living organisms function in harmony and respond to ecological changes in order for the planet to sustain life. Nishi explained about the game's message: "We should care for other people, life, the environment and nature. Sakamoto came up with the title. We wanted to question the way in which our lifestyle lacks love".

The team first considered developing the game for the PlayStation, but Nishi was convinced by Sega's president to develop it for the Dreamcast beginning in 1998. Nishi intended to communicate the game's themes without text or voices. This was done by setting the scene with a long opening sequence and utilizing various puzzles akin to a point-and-click adventure game. A communication system between the organisms consisting of sound and movement was used due to the Dreamcast's inability to perform graphical facial expressions. It was Nishi's idea to implement a cycle of eating and excreting. One of the player character's evolutionary forms resembles a black-and-white puppy, which is based on Nishi's real-life dog Tao. Sakamoto's 13-track score is made up of only abstract, synthesized electronic music with most of the songs composed to evoke a sense of a sadness or loneliness in the listener. The soundtrack was released on a single disc in Japan by Warner Music Japan on November 8, 2000.

== Reception and legacy ==
The four reviewer panel of the Japanese magazine Famitsu gave L.O.L.: Lack of Love scores of 9, 6, 6, and 8 for a total of 29 out of 40. Robert Florence of the Scottish web series Consolevania described the game was "effortlessly one of the best games on the Dreamcast" due to the number of ambitious ideas present and the unique concept that binds these ideas together. The staff at Computer and Video Games were also impressed by its originality and described the soundtrack as "one of videogaming's finest audio moments". Despite having no language barrier, Anoop Gantayat of IGN was unsure of the game's overall message, in which he questioned: "Your long-term goal in the game? To live, apparently - at least that's what the instruction manual says. Your short term goal? To advance to the next field of play, I presume".

L.O.L.: Lack of Love sold poorly at Japanese retail. GamesTM suggests that it was not picked up for either North America or European release because its "theme and setting certainly separate it from the bankable generic titles that clog up most of the top ten in any given year". The magazine considered L.O.L.: Lack of Love as "one of the Dreamcast's best-kept secrets" and a collector's item that currently fetches high prices on auction websites. Nishi has expressed interest in remaking the game: "If I have a chance, I would like to remake LOL for another console and release it again. I believe Lack of Love would be accepted more widely now because we are more seriously dealing with climate change and global warming".

Before his death in early 2023, Ryuichi Sakamoto performed the main theme to L.O.L.: Lack of Love in his last recorded solo performance Opus where he also performed other highlights from his career. Opus was released as a theatrical film in 2024 and as a soundtrack album months after.
