= Taishō Award =

Taishō Award (大賞, Taishō) usually refers to the Nihon SF Taisho Award, an annual Japanese science fiction award given by the Science Fiction and Fantasy Writers of Japan.

It may also refer to:

- Japan Booksellers' Award, or Hon'ya Taishō, an annual Japanese literary award given by bookstore clerks throughout Japan
- Manga Taishō, an annual Japanese manga award
- Animax Taishō, an annual anime scriptwriting competition organized by the Japanese anime satellite television network, Animax
- New/Trendy Word Award (Shingo ryūkōgo taishō), Japanese "Word of the Year" award
