= Chulip =

2002 video game

- North American cover art
- Developer: Punchline
- Publishers: JP: Victor Interactive Software; NA: Natsume Inc.
- Director: Yoshiro Kimura
- Producers: Yasuhiro Wada; Hiroshi Suzuki
- Designer: Norikazu Yasunaga
- Programmer: Shinji Ichiyama
- Artist: Ryuji Nouguchi
- Writer: Yoshiro Kimura
- Composer: Hirofumi Taniguchi
- Platforms: PlayStation 2 PlayStation Network
- Release: PlayStation 2: JP: October 3, 2002; NA: February 13, 2007; PlayStation Network: NA: December 4, 2012
- Genres: Adventure, Life simulation
- Mode: Single-player

Chulip (チュウリップ), stylized as Chu♥lip, is an adventure/simulation video game developed by Punchline and released on October 3, 2002, in Japan by Victor Interactive Software for the PlayStation 2. After numerous delays, the game was released in North America by Natsume Inc. on February 13, 2007, as a GameStop-exclusive title. It was released on the PlayStation Network as a "PS2 Classic" on December 4, 2012, exclusively in North America.

Chulip puts the player in the role of a young man who has just moved to a new town and next door to the girl of his dreams. Although she wants nothing to do with him due to his family's poor economic status, he decides to write her a heartfelt love letter. When the letter is stolen, it is up to the protagonist to travel around the village and retrieve all of its pieces. The gameplay of Chulip revolves around improving the player's reputation with the citizens in order to access all parts of the town. To do this, the player must impress each member of the community and then kiss them.

Chulip was directed by Yoshiro Kimura, a former employee of Love-de-Lic. Kimura wanted the game's focus to be on kissing in public, a more Western-accepted custom, within a Japanese setting. Chulip suffered dismal sales, while its overall critical reception has been negative to average, sometimes mixed. Most reviews cited the game's quirkiness and charm as its strong points yet criticized its tedious gameplay mechanics. The game has gained a small cult following.

== Plot ==
Chulip opens with a dream sequence in which the unnamed male protagonist kisses the girl he loves under the talking "Lover's Tree" on a green hill. The dream takes its course and the tree ends the sequence saying they lived happily ever after. However, once the protagonist wakes up, he and his father are just moving into Long Life Town, which appears very much like a small, Japanese village. Coincidentally, the girl of his dreams lives in this town, but she flatly rejects him due to coming from a very poor family. Taking his father's advice, the hero decides to kiss the odd citizens of the town in order to strengthen his heart and improve his reputation. En route to doing so, he also resolves to write a love letter to his crush. When this treasured set of papers is stolen, he must search Long Life Town for the missing pieces. The hero's journey involves numerous bizarre incidents that lead him to cheating his way to the top of a major corporation, making contact with aliens, and acting as a defense lawyer in court. Once the three pieces of the love letter (the ink, paper, and pen) are collected, he writes and mails it to the girl. The game's ending shows the two meeting and kissing beneath the Lover's Tree, as the protagonist had dreamed.

== Gameplay ==
The player (center-left) successfully kisses an NPC. The player's health is located at the top-left of the screen.

Chulip is an adventure/simulation game in which the player must improve the hero's reputation in the community of Long Life Town by kissing its various citizens. The player's health is represented by a number of hearts. To gain more hearts, the player has to find and kiss other characters in the game. Finding out how and when to kiss other characters is a puzzle in and of itself. The game and each of its non-player characters (NPCs) follow a 24-hour day schedule. In the daytime, many of the NPCs of the game walk around the streets. To succeed in kissing an NPC, the player is required to wait for the correct time where they will be happy and press the corresponding button. The player must sometimes complete a certain task for that NPC in order to achieve the kiss condition. Choosing the wrong time to kiss will often result in the player getting hit and losing health. Exploring Long Life Town presents the player with numerous environmental hazards discovered by trial and error. For instance, attempting to use the town's playground equipment or being suddenly shot at by the night-patrolling policeman will cause instant death. One mission ends in the player being struck by lightning, removing more than ten hearts and resulting in a game over if the player does not have sufficient health.

Some denizens of Chulip only come out of their underground apartments through holes in the ground at certain times of the day. If the player looks through these holes, clues are given in regards to when they come out or when to kiss them. After an NPC comes out of the ground, the player has a very limited opportunity to give them a kiss. If the player successfully kisses enough NPCs and returns home to sleep, the hero's father will recite his progress and the Lover's Tree will give the player more hearts and an improved reputation if he advances. Secondary to improving his reputation, the player must track down all the pieces to the "Love Letter Set" by traveling throughout Long Life Town. As the story progresses, the player gains access to new areas of the game world via train, which include many more underground residents and hazards. Saving takes place in various bathrooms.

== Development ==
Chulip was developed by a team of 12 to 14 people at Punchline, then a department of Skip Ltd. The game took two and a half years to complete after its initial planning; one year and three months were devoted to programming. Director Yoshiro Kimura started work on the project as he helped his colleagues at Love-de-Lic finish that company's final game, L.O.L.: Lack of Love. Production of Chulip began in the earliest days of the PS2, making it a challenge for the development team who only had experience with the original PlayStation. Kimura valued his team members' opinions and ideas while working on it. "It was challenging and interesting at the same time to program a game for a new console," he stated. "We were definitely eager to see what we could do with it." The original idea for Chulip came when Kimura visited Western countries and saw couples kissing in public, a custom not often performed among Japanese people. Kimura came up with the game's title after attending a party in Tokyo. The partygoers consumed alcohol whilst discussing video games, and while intoxicated they began to humorously say "chu-shite" (lit. "kiss me"). The title Chulip is a play on words: a cross between chu (the Japanese onomatopoeia for the sound of a kiss) and the English word lip, as well as the Japanese rendering of the word tulip.

Kimura eventually spoke with Marvelous Entertainment's Yosuhiro Wada about creating a game mixing a "flare of Moon and Japan a little while ago (say about 40 years ago)". Kimura wanted Chulip to be localized to show the world certain aspects of Japanese culture and "all the kind of interesting stuff that you can see every day". He also wanted to display a real, modern truancy problem for Japanese students with the game's cast of underground dwellers. Norikazu Yasunaga designed many of the game's mechanics. According to Kimura, "for efficient procedure, [Yasunaga] set it up so that the personality and the characteristics for each NPC had to be one-by-one". The character designs were done by Ryuji Nouguchi, who used items from Kimura's personal scrapbook and "made them funny". The musical score to Chulip was composed by Hirofumi Taniguchi, another former member of Love-de-Lic. The soundtrack was released by King Records in Japan on a single disc on November 22, 2002. Songs 35 through 44 represent the "Tsurukame Movie Soundtrack", consisting of music for each of the game's short films, while songs 45 and 46 are bonus tracks.

Publisher Natsume Inc. licensed the game for a projected North American release in early 2004. The game was then shown at the Electronic Entertainment Expo that year. Natsume Inc. realized early on that it would be an extremely obscure title and thus planned on releasing it at a low retail price. The game was delayed, and Natsume Inc. assured that it would be released sometime in 2005. After more delays, Chulip was ultimately released in North America on February 13, 2007, the day before Valentine's Day, exclusively to GameStop stores. The North American version was supposed to feature updated graphics and an "accurately meticulous" translation of Japanese text. Natsume Inc. claimed that Punchline's busy schedule resulted in such a long delay for the localization and that it also prevented them from making any graphical changes.

== Reception and legacy ==
Reception

Aggregate scores
Aggregator	Score
GameRankings	57%
Metacritic	57 out of 100

Review scores
Publication	Score
1Up.com	C+
Famitsu	32 out of 40
Game Informer	3 out of 10
GameSpot	6.0 out of 10
IGN	6.0 out of 10
PlayStation: The Official Magazine	3 out of 5
X-Play	3/5

Chulip received mostly average critical scores upon its release in North America. The game currently holds a 57% on the aggregate websites GameRankings and Metacritic. The ambitious gameplay of Chulip has been almost universally criticized. Ray Barnholt of 1UP.com, Ryan Davis of GameSpot, Micah Seff of IGN, and Gus Mastrapa of X-Play all labeled the often-unclear progression presented to the player as "frustrating" and "tedious", requiring an excessive amount of patience. Mastrapa summarized, "Since the game is on 24-hour clock a missed opportunity means having to wait until the next day to take another crack. Add the fact that your inexperienced, young avatar can die from heartbreak, resulting in a 'game over' screen and the loss of unsaved progress and you've got a recipe for annoyance." Barnholt, Davis, and Seff did positively credit Natsume Inc. for the inclusion of the mini-strategy guide. Despite faulting the "indistinct objectives", Davis found gratification in successful kisses. "The whole kissing thing is absolutely fantastic in concept," Davis stated, "And there's something unsettling about your character's encouraged promiscuity." However, Game Informer writer Ben Reeves described the game as one of the most poorly designed games he has ever played due to its lack of in-game direction and frequency of game overs. In January 2008, Game Informer listed Chulip as one of the worst games of 2007.

Reviewers have praised Chulip for a charming presentation, quirky characters, and absurd, Japanese humor. Admitting that the game had some blurry or pixelated textures and cramped environments, both Seff and Davis noted the peculiar art style of Chulip to be aesthetically pleasing. Seff specifically found the game "surprisingly easy on the eyes" and to feature unique character designs, "wacky" dialogue, and an art style comparable to other titles like the Mother series and Katamari Damacy. Davis was amused by the script and the townsfolk's gibberish speech, and was satisfied with largely a cappella soundtrack. Seff was unimpressed by the game's audio, remarking the music as "entirely boring".

According to Media Create information, Chulip sold only 6,645 units during its first week of release in Japan. Despite such low sales, Chulip was re-released in Japan two separate times, first as part of the "Victor the Best" selection on April 24, 2003, and second as part of the "Super Best Collection" on July 6, 2006. Many of Chulip's key development members and their design philosophies were carried over to the 2009 Wii game Little King's Story. That year, Kimura stated that he would like to make a sequel to Chulip. He was also contemplating creating a version set in an American location such as The Bronx with a protagonist that is African-American, Caucasian, or some other ethnicity.

Despite initially low sales, the game has been reappraised in the West as a hidden gem in the PlayStation 2's vast library. Its unique atmosphere, interesting characters, exploration of social themes, and distinct Japanese flair have garnered it a small cult following.
