= Dandy Dungeon: Legend of Brave Yamada =

2016 roguelike video game

Dandy Dungeon - Legend of Brave Yamada -
- Icon artwork
- Developer: Onion Games
- Publishers: DMM Games (iOS, Android); Onion Games (NS, PC, macOS)
- Director: Yoshiro Kimura
- Artist: Kazuyuki Kurashima
- Writer: Yoshiro Kimura
- Composer: Keiichi Sugiyama
- Engine: Unity
- Platforms: iOS; Android; Nintendo Switch; Windows macOS
- Release: iOS, Android: JP: January 15, 2016; WW: January 17, 2017; Nintendo Switch: WW: June 27, 2019; Windows, macOS: WW: November 28, 2019
- Genres: Roguelike, role-playing
- Mode: Single-player

Dandy Dungeon - Legend of Brave Yamada - (Note: Known in Japan as Yūsha Yamada-kun (Japanese: 勇者ヤマダくん; lit. Brave Yamada-kun)) is a 2016 roguelike video game developed by Onion Games. It was first released for iOS and Android on January 15, 2016, in Japan, and the following year internationally. It was later ported to Nintendo Switch, Windows and macOS in 2019.

The game follows Yamada-kun, a programmer who is unsatisfied with his job. As he works on a role-playing video game on his off-time, he falls in love with his neighbor Maria-chan, whom he implements into the game as a princess. The player must help Yamada-kun by "debugging" the dungeons, as he continues adding new content.

== Development ==
The game was developed by Onion Games, a studio founded in 2012 by former staff members from Love-de-Lic. The company was working on Dandy Dungeon and Million Onion Hotel simultaneously, with the latter originally being scheduled to release in 2015. However, the computer that housed all of the game's files got corrupted, meaning they had to essentially restart the project. As such, they decided to focus on Dandy Dungeon first. This incident inspired a plot point in the game, where burglars break into Yamada-kun's apartment at night and delete source code from his computer.

=== Release ===
The game was released in Japan for iOS and Android on January 15, 2016, and internationally on January 17, 2017. The English localization was handled by Tim Rogers. A free expansion titled Dandy Dungeon II: The Phantom Bride was released on June 29, 2017, which introduced new post-game dungeons, items and monsters. Additionally, "collaboration dungeons" featuring Final Fantasy series composer Nobuo Uematsu, Touhou Project creator Jun'ya "ZUN" Ōta, former Love-de-Lic composers Thelonious Monkees, and 4-koma manga series べーしっ君 (localized in-game as Basic'n) were also added.

On December 20, 2018, the iOS and Android versions were taken offline, with an update removing microtransactions and internet connection requirements, allowing players to continue playing after the server shutdown. Following the discontinuation of the mobile versions, a Nintendo Switch port was released on June 27, 2019, with Windows and macOS versions arriving on November 28. The Dandy Dungeon II expansion content was added to these versions as a free update on April 2, 2020.

== Reception ==
Reception

Aggregate scores
Aggregator	Score
Metacritic	iOS: 91/100; NS: 78/100
OpenCritic	79% recommend

Dandy Dungeon - Legend of Brave Yamada - received generally positive reviews from critics.
