= Kenichi Nishi =

Japanese video game designer (born 1967)

- Born: June 20, 1967 (age 59); Tokyo, Japan
- Occupations: Founder of Love-de-Lic, Skip, Ltd., Route24; Game designer and director
- Website: http://www.route24.jp/

Kenichi Nishi (西 健一, Nishi Ken'ichi; born June 20, 1967) is a Japanese video game designer. He has helped found a number of notable video game companies and develops games at Route24, his own private limited company. The number 24 in the title comes from its founder's name: "Ni" (2) and "Shi" (4).

== Career ==
Nishi previously worked for both Telenet Japan and its subsidiary Riot. He was later hired by Square as a field designer for two of its larger releases. After leaving Square in 1995, Nishi helped establish Love-de-Lic, Inc. with many of his former Square coworkers. There, he designed two of the small company's three game releases: Moon: Remix RPG Adventure and L.O.L.: Lack of Love. He also helped design and write the script for the 1999 Polygon Magic title Incredible Crisis. Nishi then co-founded skip Ltd., a second-party developer for Nintendo. Acting as vice president of the company, he also directed GiFTPiA and co-directed Chibi-Robo!. Shortly thereafter, he left skip and founded Route24 on February 23, 2006. According to Nishi, he felt that working on large projects with a large group of people such as those at skip limited his freedom in designing games.

At Route24, Nishi and a staff of four other people developed LOL for the Nintendo DS, which was published by skip in 2007. He worked on Newtonica and Newtonica2 for the iPhone and iPod Touch with Kenji Eno, among other independently developed mobile games. In 2010, Nishi expressed interest in developing a sequel to Moon: Remix RPG Adventure, asking fans to voice their support via Twitter.

== Personal life ==
Nishi lives in Meguro, Tokyo. He is a fan of British rock music and once had a dog named Tao, who Nishi featured as a character in many of his games including Moon: Remix RPG Adventure, GiFTPiA, L.O.L.: Lack of Love, Chibi-Robo and Captain Rainbow. Tao died in October 2009 due to kidney complications. It is said that Dragon Quest III is Nishi's favorite game.

== Credits ==
Video game credits of Kenichi Nishi
Year	Title	Developer	Role(s)
1991	Tenshi no Uta	Telenet Japan	Planning
1991	Exile	Telenet Japan, Riot	Planning
1992	Psycho Dream	Riot	Story
1995	Chrono Trigger	Square	Field planning
1996	Super Mario RPG	Square	Field planning
1997	Moon: Remix RPG Adventure	Love-de-Lic	Game design
1999	Incredible Crisis	Polygon Magic	Game design and script
2000	L.O.L.: Lack of Love	Love-de-Lic	Writing
2003	GiFTPiA	Skip Ltd.	Director
2005	Chibi-Robo!	Skip Ltd.	Director
2007	LOL	Skip Ltd.	Designer
2008	Captain Rainbow	Skip Ltd.	Scenario
2008	Newtonica	Route24	Designer
2008	Morinaga Takurou no Okane no Shin Joushiki DS Training	Route24	Designer
2008	Newtonica2	Route24	Designer
2009	Wacky World of Sports	Tabot	Concept and advice
2009	PostPet DS	AlphaDream, Route24, Vanpool	
2010	iCLK	Route24	
2010	Geotrion	Route24	Producer and director
2010	Followars	Route24	Designer
2012	Paper Mario Sticker Star	Intelligent Systems	Special thanks
2013	Cobits	Route24	Designer
2021	Pixel Game Maker Series Puzzle Pedestrians	Route24	Designer
2026	Briki'n Roll: Course Maker	Route24	Designer
