= LaMB =

- Animax's release
- Directed by: Ryosuke Tei, Thomas Chou (English version)
- Music by: Simple Plan; The Click Five
- Production company: Animax
- Distributed by: Animax
- Release date: March 24, 2009
- Running time: 45 minutes
- Countries: Singapore; Japan
- Languages: English (original), Japanese, Hindi, Mandarin and Cantonese

LaMB is a 2009 Singaporean-Japanese animated film directed by Ryosuke Tei based on a script written by Carmelo S. J. Juinio and illustrated by Yasufumi Soejima, produced by Animax. The film tells the story of a futuristic inhabited planet that has seemingly perfected a system of justice and imprisonment, called "Lamination". Individuals convicted of serious crimes are encased in laminated suits, which results in virtual slavery. The criminals are referred to as "LaMBs". The protagonists struggle with the political and ethical system of laminated imprisonment, leading to the eventual development of a romantic relationship between a free citizen and a LaMB.

It is the first Animax original production that provided two different songs for the opening and ending themes of the movie, featuring the music of Simple Plan and The Click Five.

== Plot summary ==
LaMB takes place in the distant future on a desert planet called Cerra. The story features a prison system, in which prisoners are sealed in personal containment systems known as "laminated suits" and used for labor. Prisoners go through a "Lamination" process, where they are fitted with cybernetic, laminated skin-tight suits. In these suits, they can move around and completed work assignments that cannot be done by machine or robots. Law-abiding citizens are protected, while the criminals become members of society in a futuristic prison system. This process ensures that convicted criminals remain productive members in a system of virtual slavery. The story encompasses the dichotomy between the theory and practice of a futuristic society's justice system.

The lamination process and system of virtual slavery has made both jails and the death penalty obsolete in a world where human ingenuity, creativity, and labor continue to be precious commodities that cannot be replaced by robots or any form of artificial intelligence. The system also sparks off philosophical debates among citizens presenting pros and cons of the ethical feasibility of "Lamination".

The story follows protagonists Sara Integra and Jack Griswold's struggle against Cerra's system of imprisonment. Major Sara Integra is a former weapons specialist in bio-weapons division. While she was on a military assignment, innocent lives were lost during an experiment gone wrong. She was convicted of manslaughter and sentenced to 200 years encased in a laminated suit. Sara forever became known as Eve, or Eve1135.

When she became a LaMB, Eve was assigned a Shepherd. Shepherds control the actions and movement of the LaMBs. Included among the laws of society are that LaMBs must only act upon instructions of their Shepherds. While LaMBs can hear others, they cannot speak, nor can they touch another human being unless ordered by their Shepherd. Dr. Jack Griswold was assigned to be Eve's Shepherd.

Griswold is a scientist from another planet, specializing in advanced botanical engineering. He has been assigned the task to restore vegetation to the dry, desert planet. Among Griswold's superiors is Keiko Suzuki, Chief Scientific Advisor specializing in biophysics, and Sara Integra's niece. She has been deeply affected by the death of her parents, and her aunt's imprisonment, and lamination and has made revenge her ultimate goal in life.

Griswold tends to display workaholic traits, presumably in order to forget the recent loss of his wife. His curiosity and soul-searching thirst to understand the complexities of the universe drives his research. He tends to spend more time in the lab than anywhere else and his intense focus on his research makes him appear awkward when in comes to social interaction. Griswold inadvertently gets pulled into the politics and ethics behind the system of "Lamination", as well as a romance with Eve.

Keiko's anti-LaMB organization and conspiracy is discovered, and she is put into a lamb suit. Due to recent developments in technology, her suit may possibly be part plant. She goes on a rampage and tries to destroy Eve1135, but she is immobilized by touching Griswold while she attacked him. She loses her balance and falls off the building. Eve1135 is eventually released from prison (possibly hundreds of years later) and returns to being Sara Integra. She kisses Griswold after they put flowers on his wife's grave.

== Production ==
LaMB is based on a screenplay originally entitled Laminated Woman: To the Sand Planet Cerra written by Carmelo S. J. Juinio, one of the finalists of the 2007 Animax Awards Pan-Asia Animation competition. Its release was considered by Animax to be an example of the industry potential of user-generated content. The film is Animax's first original production presented in high definition, encompassing a series of multi-platform, multidisciplinary, and multimedia activities that revolve around the launch of the movie. The goal of the film producers had included the desire to redefine the entertainment experience for consumers from premiere to post-premiere of the film.

The movie won Best Animation at Taiwan's prestigious 2009's Golden Bell Awards.

=== Fashion design ===
Vivienne Tam, a New York based Fashion designer, designed the dresses used by LaMB characters. The designs have been made into real dresses for LaMB based events held across Asia.

== Voice actors ==
- Dr. Jack Griswold voiced by Vanness Wu (in both English and Mandarin versions)
- Sara Integra (also known as 'Eve') voiced by Petrina Kow (in the English version)
- Keiko Suzuki voiced by Josie Ho (in English and Cantonese versions), Tanaka Chie (in the Mandarin version)

LaMB was Wu's first venture into voice acting for animation. His only previous voice acting experience was in the Mandarin version of Disney/Pixar's animated feature, Cars.

Kow is a Singaporean animation voice director who has directed and voiced pre-school shows including Taoshu: The Warrior Boy, Shapes and Olive and The Rhyme Rescue Crew. She was also a radio host on Class 95FM's in-house morning radio show with Mark Van Cuylenberg from 2000 to 2002, and Radio 91.3's morning show with Joe Augustin from 2006 to 2007.

In 2004, Ho was honored with the Hong Kong Award as Best Supporting Actress for her work on the film, Naked Ambition.

== Release ==
The film has been shown on Animax channels throughout the world since 2009, dubbed into several languages for several different regions: English for the Southeast Asian region, Mandarin for Taiwan, Cantonese for Hong Kong, Hindi for Indian audiences, and Japanese for Animax Japan. The film has also been developed into four different episodes for Mobile and PSP users.

== Soundtrack ==
Canadian band Simple Plan's "I Can Wait Forever" was used for the film's title track. The song "Summertime", by American band The Click Five is also featured in the film. Animax Asia and Peach Blossom Media produced music videos for both songs that premiered on Animax across Asia and online in December 2008.

== Online game ==
Sony Pictures Television developed a tie-in online game on the same year of its release, broken into four unique chapters. There is also a meta game that offers each user the opportunity to select a side in the battle. User options include pro– or anti–lamination. Individual scores earned are additionally compiled and contributed to each side for an overall competition of "LaMBs vs. Shepherds".
