= Azusa, Otetsudai Shimasu! =

2004 television film directed by Hajime Kamegaki

アズサ、お手伝いします!
- Genre: Comedy, Science Fiction, Sports
- Anime television film
- Directed by: Hajime Kamegaki
- Written by: Yūko Kawabe
- Studio: TMS
- Original network: Animax
- Released: 2004
- Runtime: 45 minutes

Azusa, Otetsudai Shimasu! (アズサ、お手伝いします!; lit. Azusa Will Help!) is an anime television film, winner of the second annual Animax Taishō, an annual anime scriptwriting competition offered by Animax to award the best original anime scripts of the year. The award-winning script was written by Yūko Kawabe (川邊優子, Kawabe Yūko), and was animated by TMS Entertainment. It aired on Animax in 2004.

== Story ==
The Karugamo High School Baseball Team has not been doing well. After losing badly to the Eagles, many of the players leave, and the team is left with only eight players, one too few to play a game. Going against his principles, the main character Harumaki Shunpei decides to buy a baseball robot. However, since he does not have enough money, he ends up buying the maid robot named Azusa. Even though Azusa has a warm heart and strong determination, it doesn't appear that she stands a chance against her adversaries who were top-of-the-line baseball robots. The team's only hope seems to lie in a secret buried within Azusa's clouded past.
