= Ryōsuke Tei =

Japanese animator

Ryōsuke Tei (程 亮介, Tei Ryōsuke), born 1968, is a Japanese animator, director and founder of graphic and creative design studio Furi Furi. In 2009, he directed the anime movie LaMB, where he collaborated with Yasufumi Soejima.

== Career ==
Born 1968 in Kobe, Japan, Tei went on to pursue a fine arts education in oil painting at the Tama Art University. Tei then went on to tour various Asian countries before he returned to Japan in 1993 and experienced the baptism of the new digital design wave as he joined the gaming industry which was in the middle of its first generation console movement.

In 1998, Tei founded creative design agency Furi Furi and served as President and Creative Director for 10 years where he led character, web-based, computer games, on-air, and flash animation design projects, as well as commercial production. His representative works include 'GIFTPIA' for Nintendo, 'Monster 360' for Nike, 'Butazuka' for Yahoo! Japan, 'SWAG' for MTV Asia.
