= Tokyo Ska Paradise Orchestra =

Japanese ska and jazz band

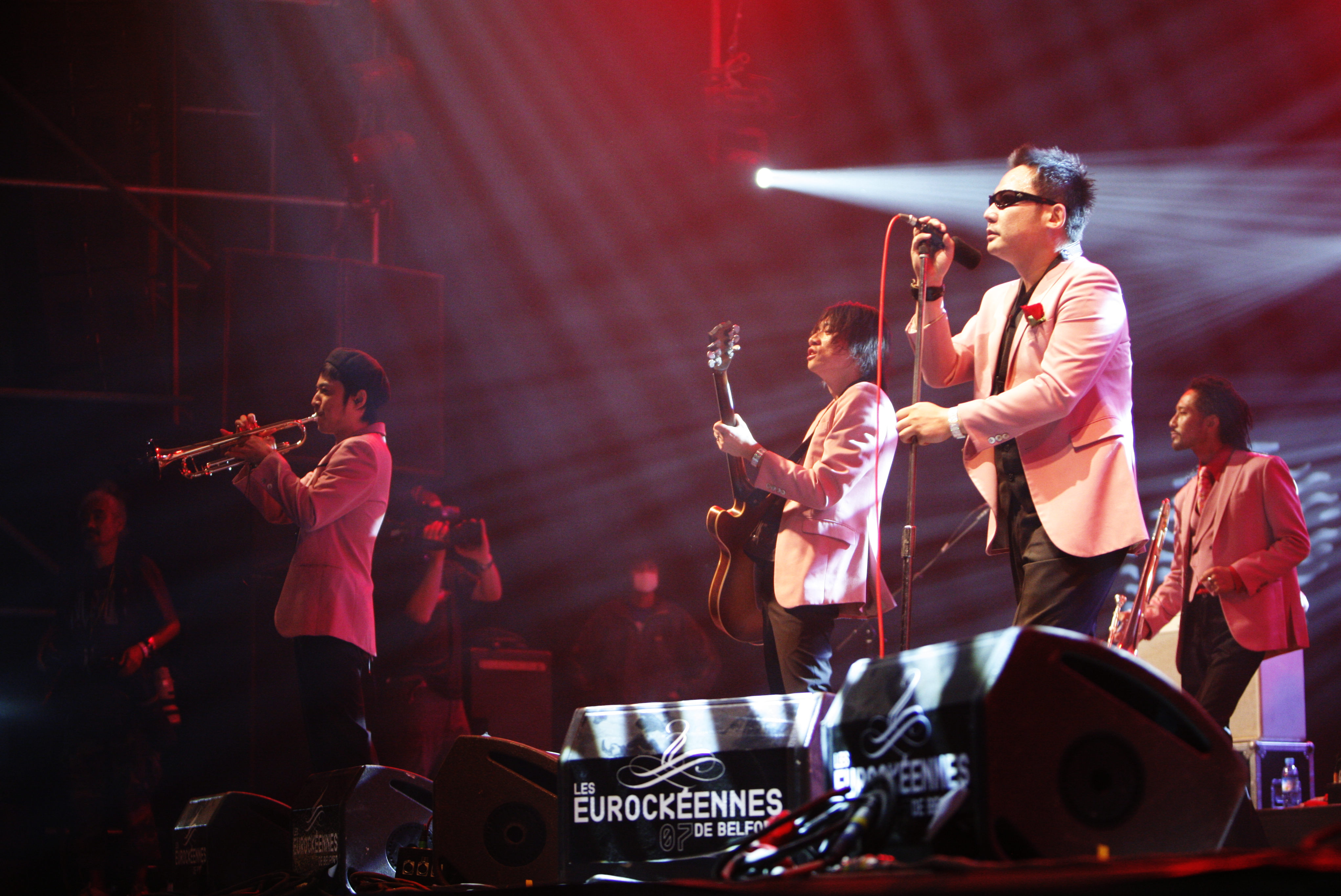
- Tokyo Ska Paradise Orchestra at the Eurockéennes, 2007

Background information
- Also known as: Skapara, TSPO
- Origin: Tokyo, Japan
- Genres: Ska; Jazz; Latin
- Years active: 1985–present
- Labels: File; Epic/Sony; Cutting Edge
- Members: Nargo; Masahiko Kitahara; Gamou; Atsushi Yanaka; Yuichi Oki; Takashi Kato; Tsuyoshi Kawakami; Hajime Ohmori; Kin-ichi Motegi
- Past members: Yuhei Takeuchi; Masayuki Hayashi; Asa-Chang; Cleanhead Gimura; Toru Terashi; Rui Sugimura; Tatsuyuki Aoki; Tatsuyuki Hiyamuta
- Website: tokyoska.net

Tokyo Ska Paradise Orchestra (東京スカパラダイスオーケストラ, Tōkyō Suka Paradaisu Ōkesutora), commonly abbreviated by fans as Skapara or TSPO, is a Japanese ska, jazz and Latin band formed in 1988 by the percussionist Asa-Chang, and initially composed of over 10 veterans of Tokyo's underground scene. At the time, the band's sound was unlike that of any of its contemporaries in the then fledgling Japanese ska scene, and over thirty years, they have been influential on Japanese music as a whole. Its sound, the product of the musical influences of its members, is a mix of traditional ska, jazz, Latin and rock. In the vein of many other more traditional ska acts, many of Skapara's songs are purely instrumental.

Since its inception, the band has gone on several nationwide tours of Japan, and have toured worldwide. They have collaborated with several vocalists outside of their band, including Shiina Ringo, Yoohei Kawakami, Akira Kobayashi, Kyōko Koizumi, Schadaraparr, Puffy, Yoshie Nakano, and Tamio Okuda. They also performed the Japanese theme song to the PlayStation 2 game Sly Cooper and the Thievius Raccoonus, entitled "Black Jack", as well as songs for the PlayStation game Incredible Crisis released in 1999, the 2020–21 Japanese drama Kamen Rider Saber and the closing ceremony for the 2020 Olympic Games.

== History ==
=== Beginnings ===
The band's first release was 1989's eponymous six-track EP, released on vinyl by local independent label Kokusai Records. That record's acceptance, coupled with the band's live shows, got them a deal with Epic Records. At this time the 'classic' lineup of the band included: Asa-Chang (percussions), Tsuyoshi Kawakami (Bass), Tatsuyuki Aoki (drums), Yuichi Oki (keyboards), Marc Hayashi (guitar), Tatsuyuki Hiyamuta (alto sax/agitate man), Gamo (tenor sax), Atsushi Yanaka (baritone sax), Nargo (trumpet), Masahiko Kitahara (trombone) and Cleanhead Gimura (vocals). Yuhei Takeuchi (alto sax) was part of the original lineup, but left in 1990, though he has re-joined the band live on several occasions.

=== 1990s ===
Skapara's Intro (スカパラ登場) was released in 1990, and includes their first big hit, Monster Rock. Within a year, the band was playing Tokyo's Budokan Arena in front of 10,000 fans. After their second album, World Famous (ワールドフェイマス), original guitarist Marc Hayashi left the band and was replaced by Toru Terashi. Their third album, Pioneers, marked the last recording of the band with founder Asa-Chang, who decided to pursue a solo career. Fantasia was recorded as a 10 piece with no permanent replacement on percussion.

While the band worked on their fifth album, vocalist Cleanhead Gimura lost his ongoing battle with brain cancer and died. Grand Prix was released in 1995 as a tribute to the singer. This record continued the band's progression into a more pop-oriented sound, and it featured a number of guest musicians and singers. As far as live performances, Tatsuyuki Hiyamuta essentially became the front-man for the band.

1996 saw the release of Tokyo Strut (トーキョーストラット), which toned back the pop stylings of Grand Prix. This marked the first appearance on record of new percussionist Hajime Ohmori. During the band's visit to Thailand, Alto Sax/Agitate Man Tatsuyuki Hiyamuta was involved in a motorcycle accident, suffering damage to his legs. He missed out on some shows, but after recovery decided to continue performing, in many cases carrying a cane, or just sitting down while playing. Shortly thereafter Toru Terashi left the band.

After this album, the band decided to leave Epic Records, as there was a feeling that the label had not been able to properly convert their popularity into record sales. They signed with indie label Avex Trax, who also created an exclusive imprint for Skapara, Justa Record. The band recruited Rui Sugimura (brother of Cleanhead Gimura) as a full-time singer. This would become the band's most prolific period, with a number of releases, including the Arkestra album, various 12" and 7" records (which included remixes from Arkestra songs as well as completely new tracks), the Hinotama Jive EP, the soundtrack to the video game Incredible Crisis, and several tribute album appearances. The band embarked on a tour of Japan (documented on the DVD Ska Evangelists on the Run). Since no official guitarist had been hired yet, they toured with the two guitarists that worked on the album: Takashi Kato (of Lost Candi) and 會田茂一 (of El Malo).

During the Arkestra tour, original drummer Tatsuyuki Aoki died in a train accident. He was temporarily replaced by Tatsuya Nakamura (Blankey Jet City and Losalios). At the end of the tour, Kin-Ichi Motegi (Fishmans) also filled in. Rui Sugimura left in mid-1999 as well. Takashi Kato became a permanent member of the band.

=== 2000s ===
2000's Full Tension Beaters was a full-on Ska record, and their first album to be released outside of Asia (by Grover Records in Germany). Even though Motegi was still working as support drummer during this recording, it was the first record with the band's most stable line-up, consisting of Yanaka, Gamo, Nargo, Kitahara and Hiyamuta on the horn section, Oki on keyboards, Kawakami on Bass, Ohmori on percussions, Kato on guitar and Motegi on drums. The lineup would remain the same until 2008.

For their next record, Stomping on Downbeat Alley, the band invited three guest singers: Yusuke Chiba (Thee Michelle Gun Elephant), Tajima Takao (Original Love, Pizzicato Five) and Tamio Okuda (Unicorn). The album and singles were a huge success and a gig at Yokohama Arena (with all three guest singers) was released as Downbeat Arena. The band also embarked on a European tour which was documented on the DVD Catch the Rainbow.

High Numbers was a more low-profile release, having mostly instrumental tracks, along with Kin-Ichi Motegi's first lead vocal track, "Ginga to Meiro". 2004's Answer was a similar affair.

For 2006's Wild Peace, the band once again recruited three guest vocalists: Chara, Hanaregumi, and Hiroto Komoto (The High-Lows). As with Downbeat Alley these singles became huge hits, and the band also recorded a DVD at the final show for the tour, with all three singers. They once again toured Europe with this record. The DVD Smile was released to document this tour.

Perfect Future soon followed, with more jazz leanings, and only one guest vocalist, Fumio Ito (of Kemuri). Kin-Ichi Motegi also recorded a vocal track for this album. A few months after the release of Perfect Future, Tatsuyuki Hiyamuta, essentially the band's front man in live performances, decided to leave the band in order to concentrate on healing his legs, due to the accident suffered in 1996. The band decided not to replace him, thereby remaining as a nine-piece.

In early 2009 Paradise Blue was released, with the first line-up difference in almost a decade. This marked the 20th anniversary since the band's first EP was released, and they toured Japan in support of the album.

=== 2010s ===
2010 saw the release of World Ska Symphony, featuring guest vocals from Tamio Okuda, Crystal Kay, and Kazuyoshi Saito.

They played at Vive Latino Festival in Mexico City in April 2011. This was their first show in Latin America. They played at Coachella in California on April 12, 2013.

In 2014, the band celebrated their 25th anniversary. For the release of Ska Me Forever, the album featured guest vocals from 10-Feet, MONGOL800, and Asian Kung-Fu Generation.

In October 2014, the band released Ska Me Forever Mexican Edition, edited by "Casete", which includes a CD bonus with 2 special songs: "Cielito Lindo" and an arrangement of "Cafe Tacvba" hit "Eres". They also played a show in Mexico City to promote this edition for more than 6,000 people, making it their highest attended solo concert in North America.

In 2020, the band composed and performed the opening and ending songs for the Tokusatsu series, Kamen Rider Saber.

== Members ==
Current members

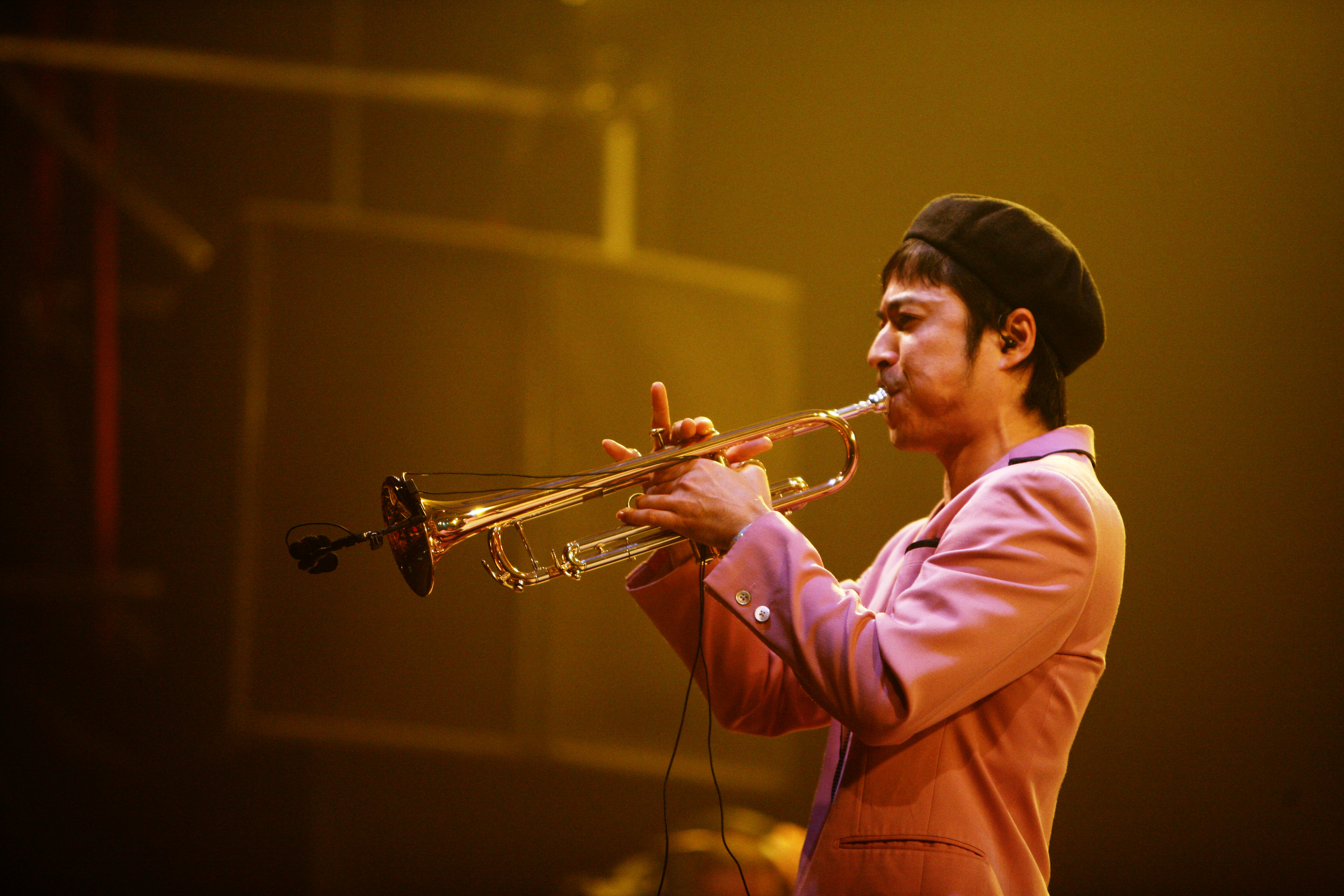
NARGO (Kimiyoshi Nagoya) on trumpet, Firebird trumpet and melodica (Original Member)

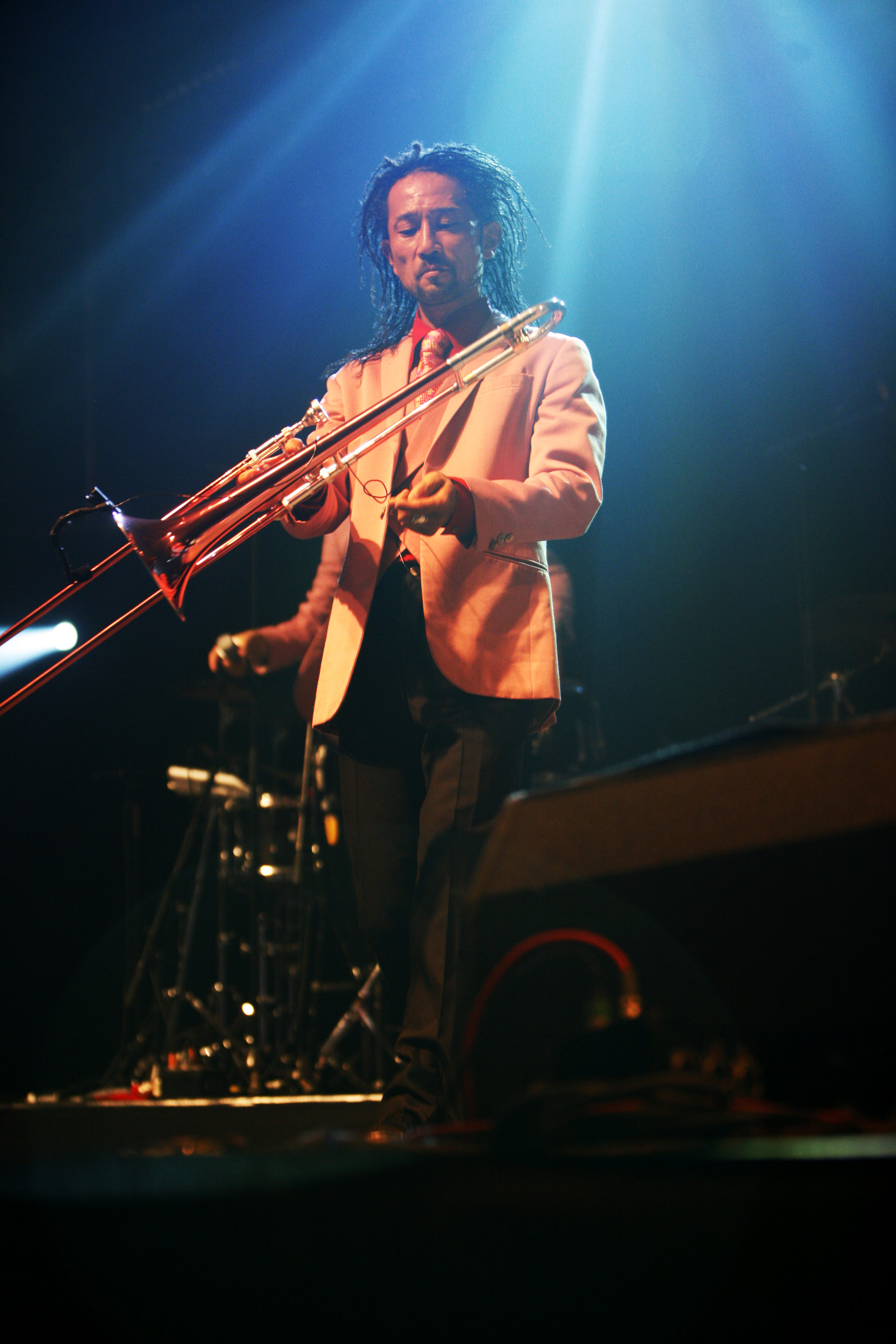
Masahiko Kitahara on trombone and sousaphone (Original Member)

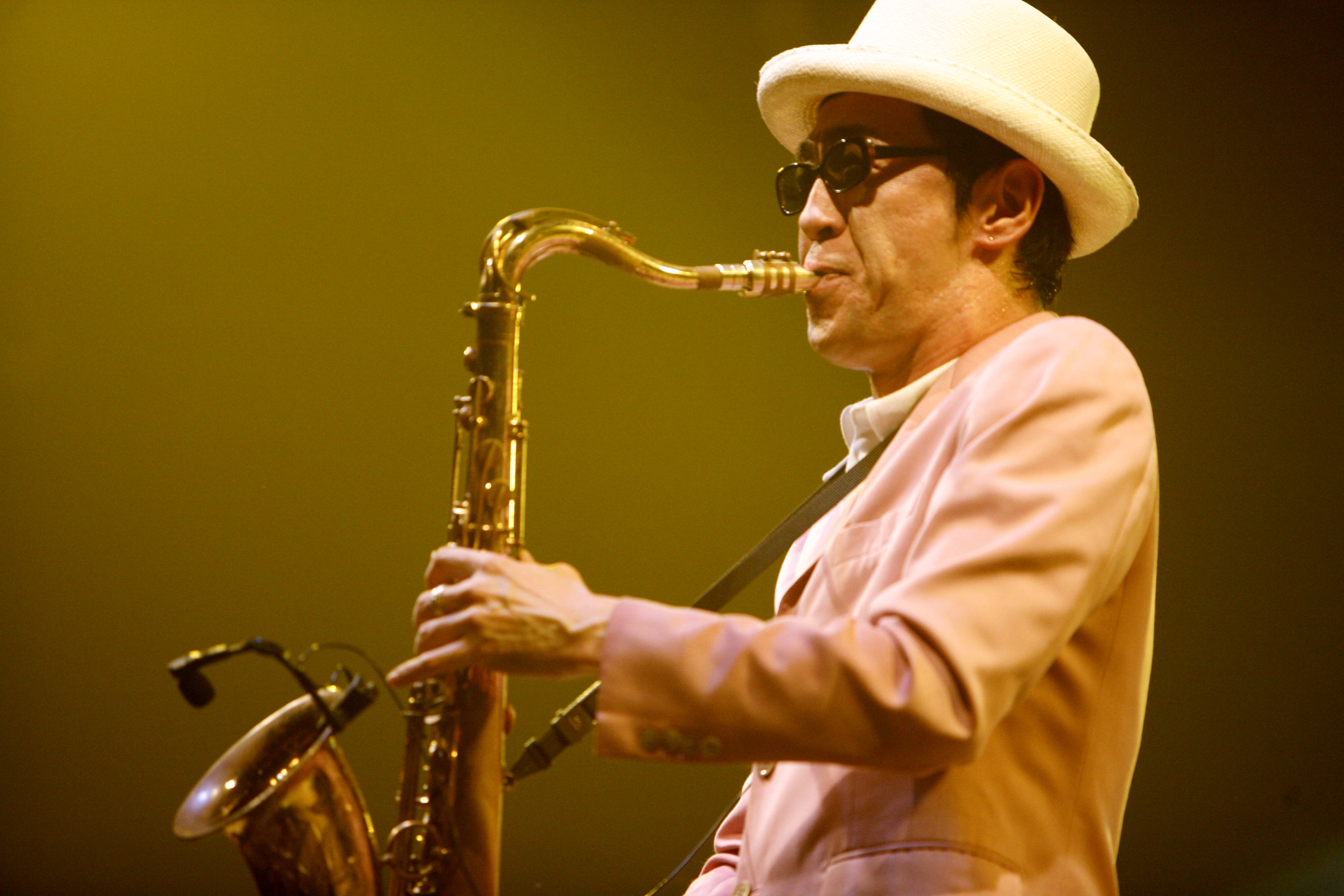
GAMO on tenor saxophone and soprano saxophone (Original Member)

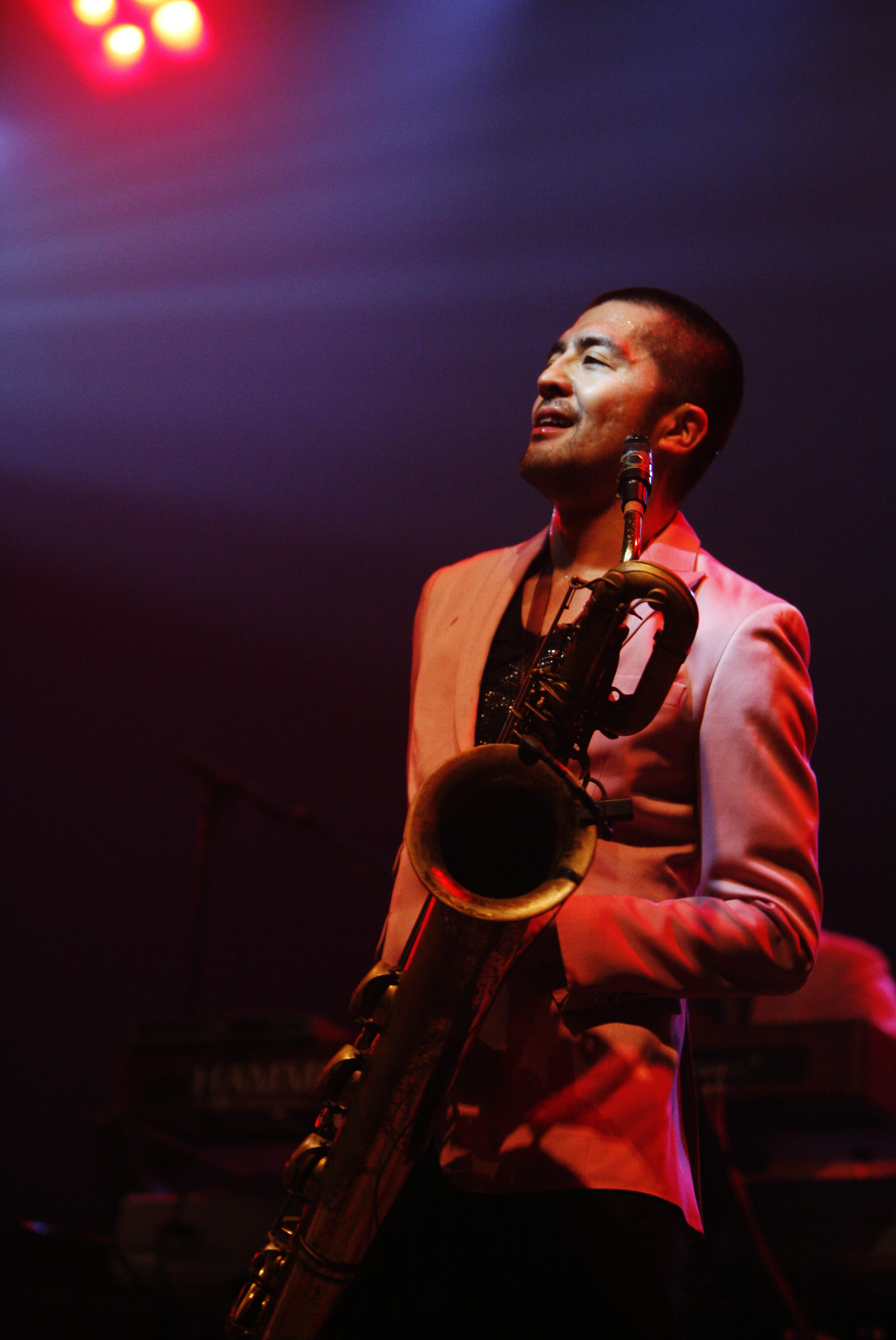
Atsushi Yanaka on baritone saxophone (Original Member)

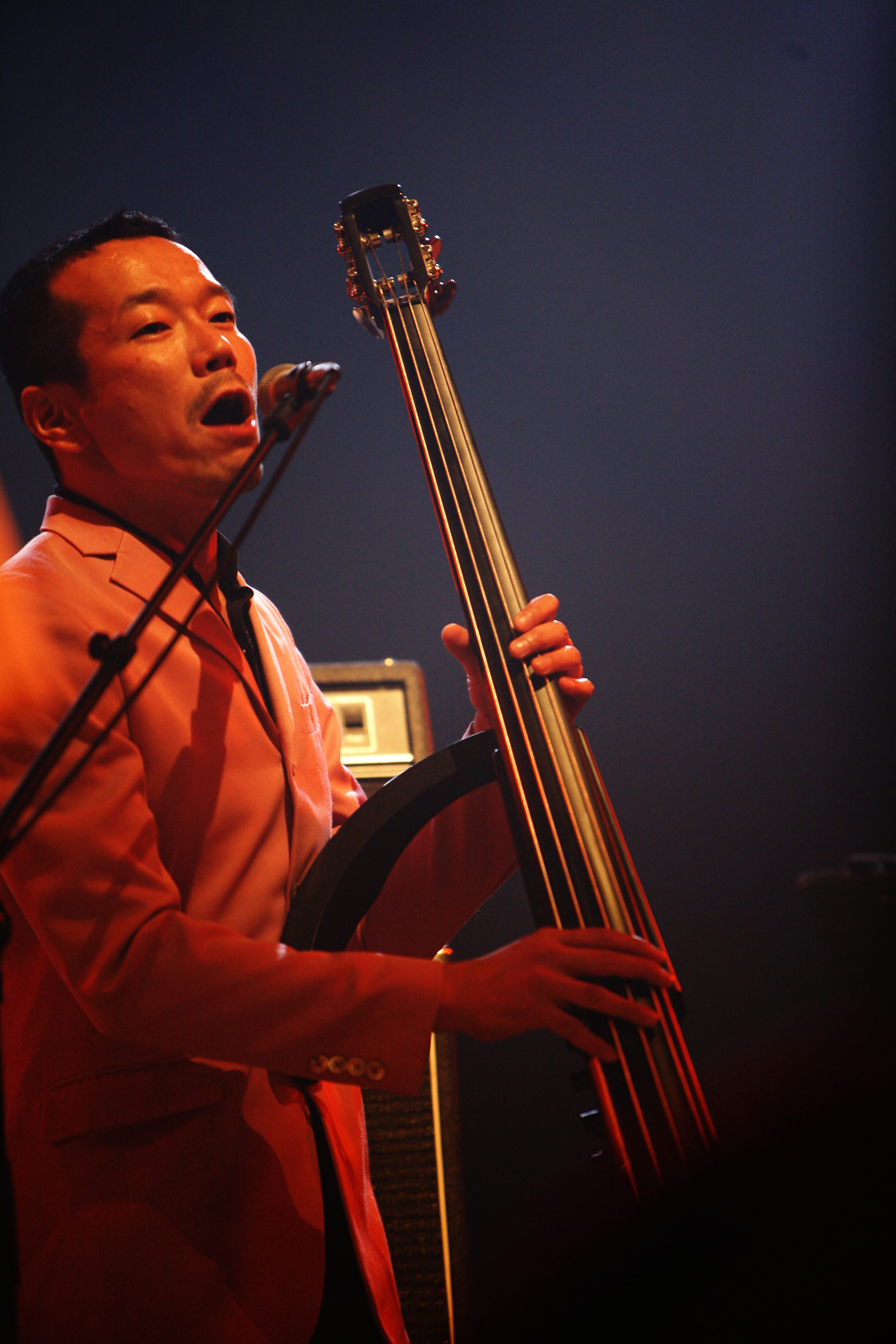
Tsuyoshi Kawakami on bass (Original Member)

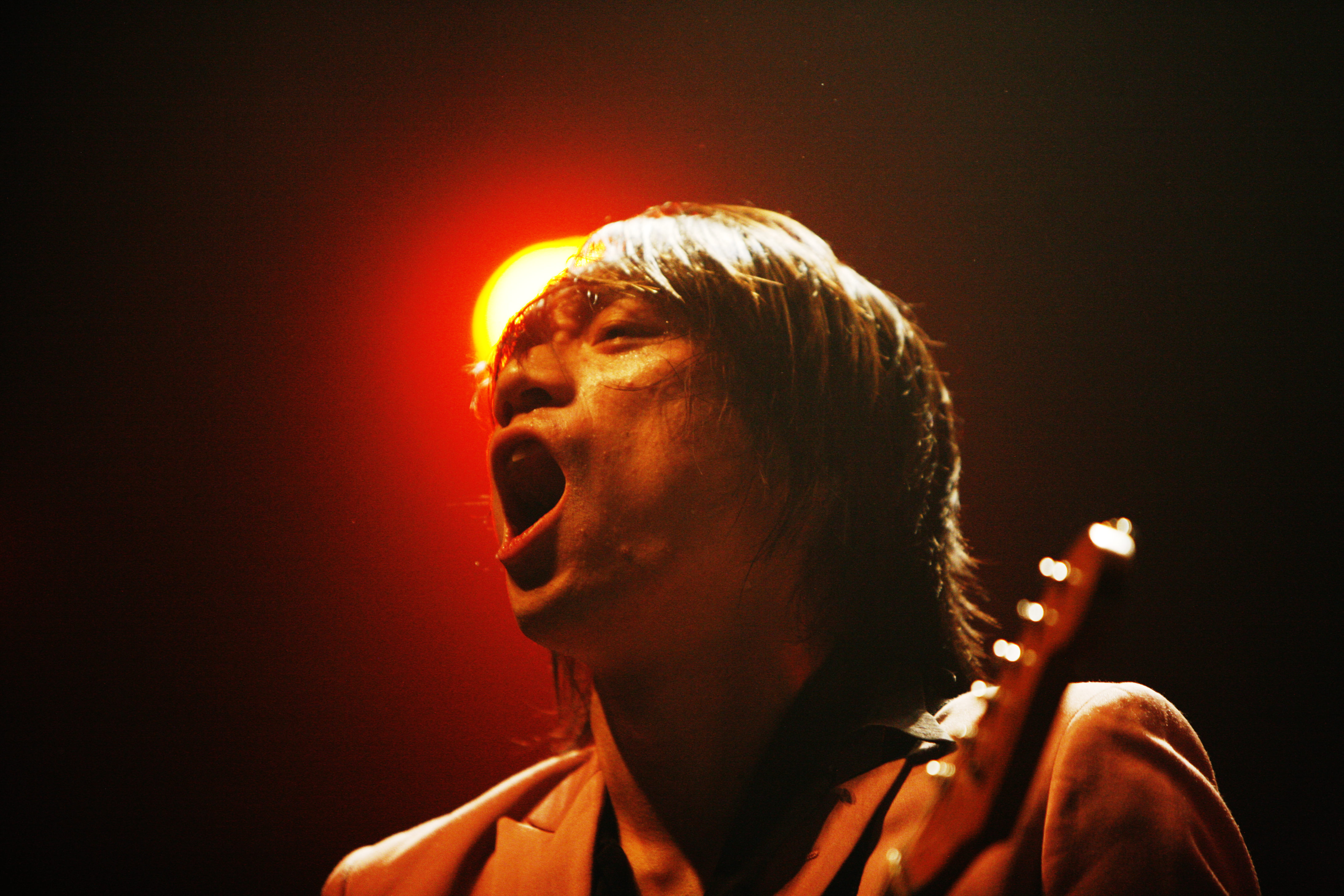
Takashi Kato on guitar (Joined 1998)

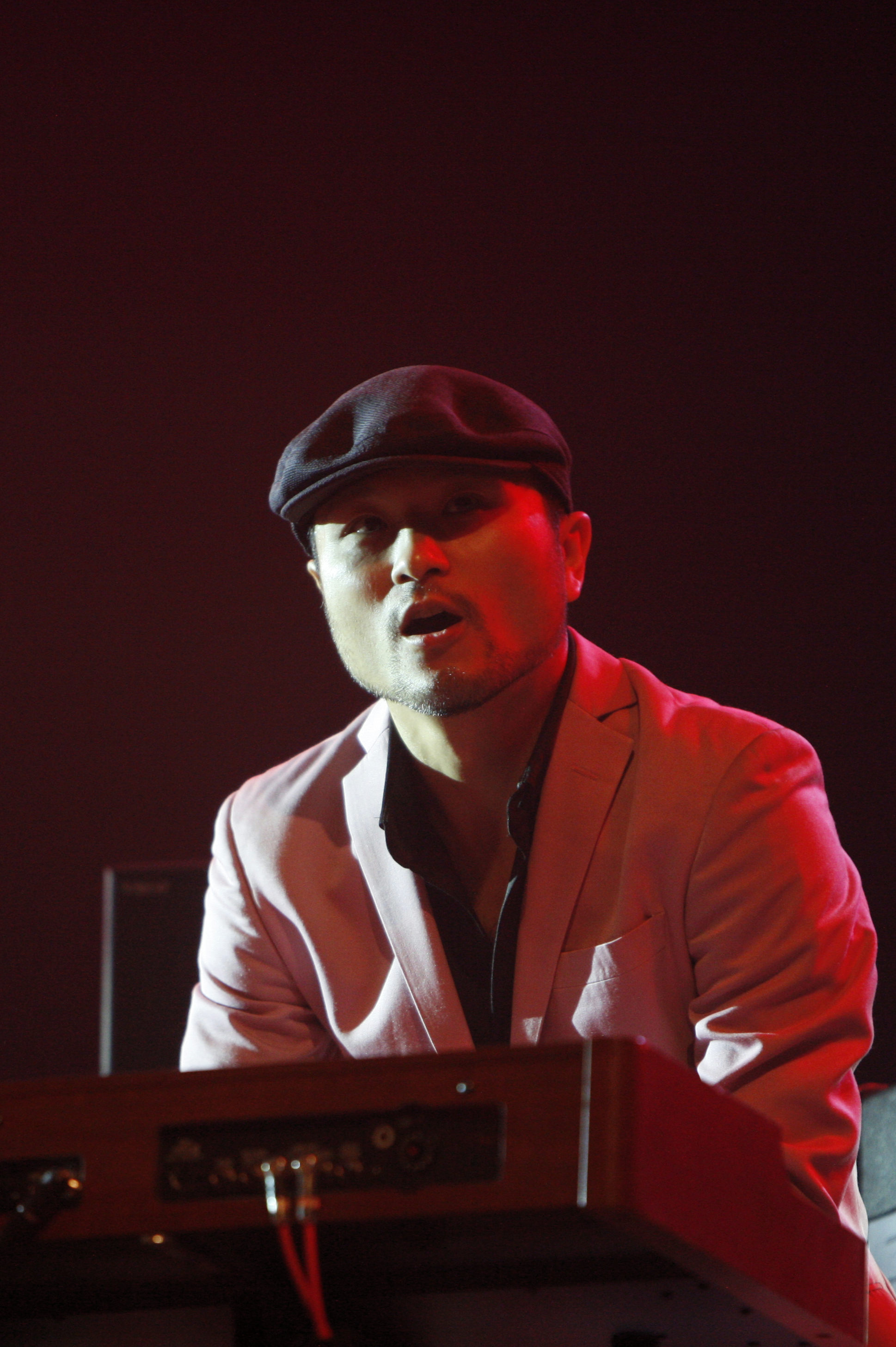
Yuichi Oki on keyboards (Original Member)

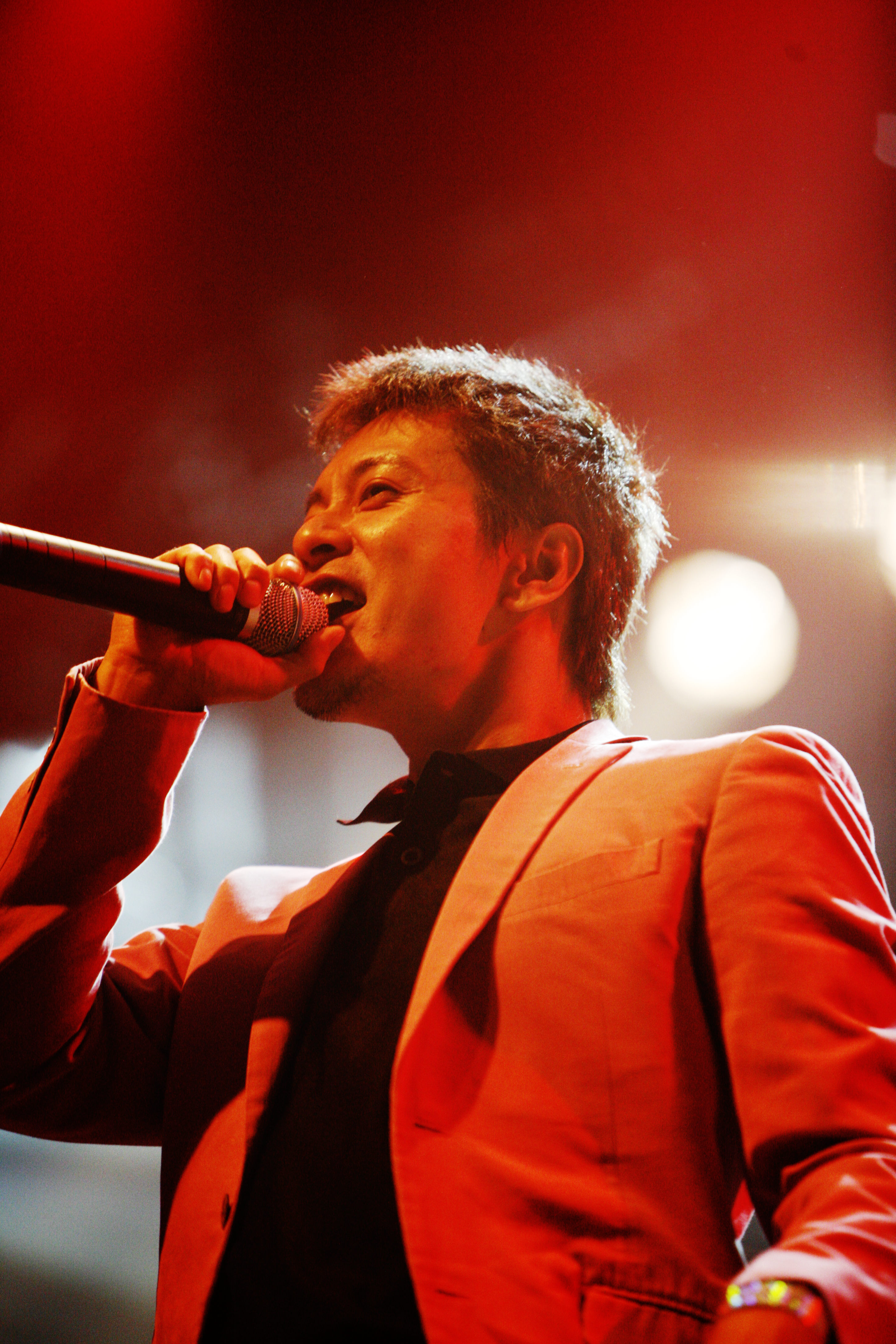
Hajime Ohmori on percussion (Joined 1996)

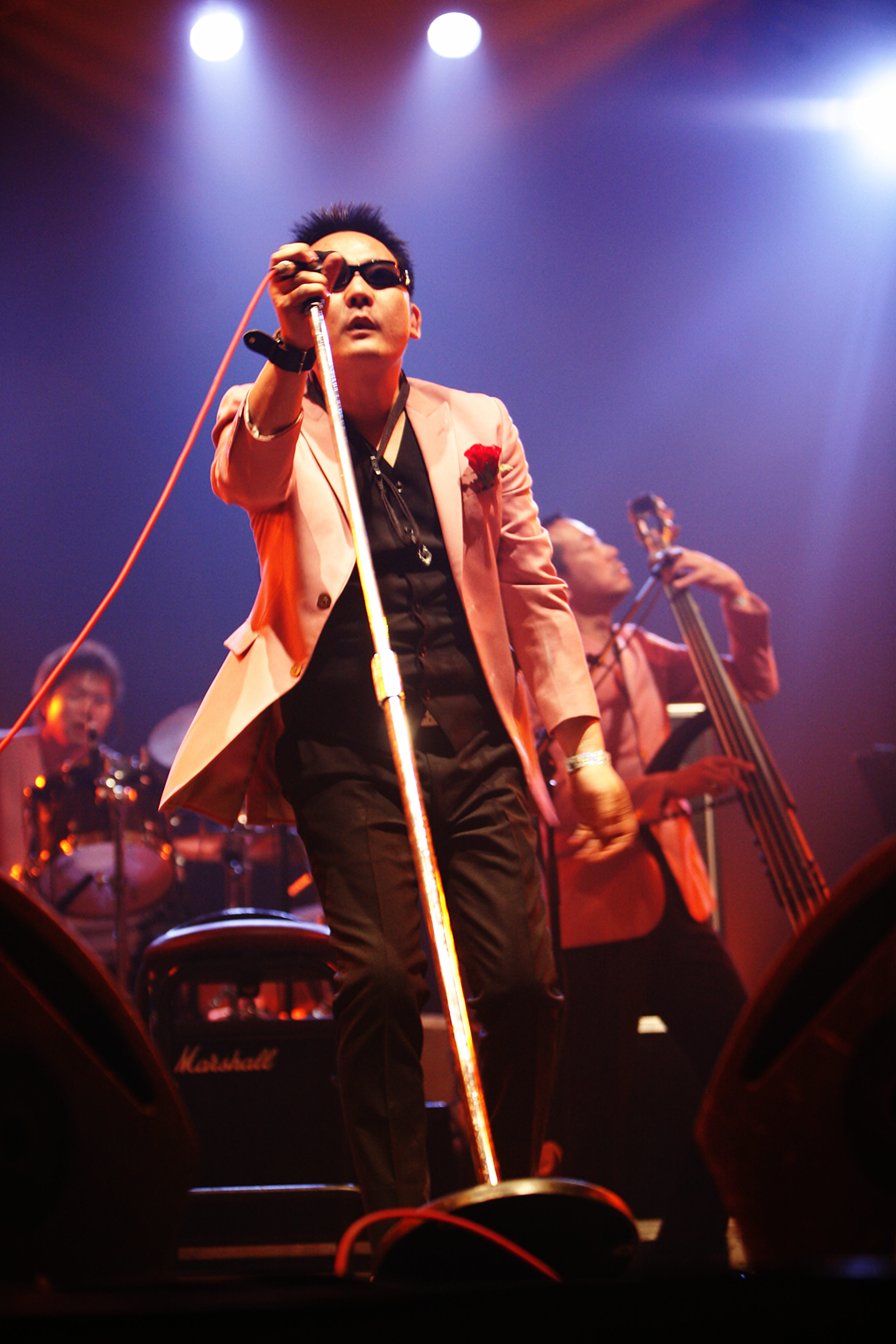
Kinichi Motegi on Drums in background (Joined 1999) with Tatsuyuki Hiyamuta (see below) in foreground

Former members

- Yuhei Takeuchi — soprano saxophone, flute (left 4/1990)
- Masayuki "MARC" Hayashi — guitar (left 6/1992)
- Asa-Chang — percussion (left 3/1993)
  - Left the band in order to pursue other projects.
- Cleanhead Gimura — vocals (died 4/23/1995)
  - The band's frontman. Died following a battle with brain cancer.
- Toru Terashi — guitar (joined 7/1993, left 1/1998)
- Rui Sugimura — vocals (joined 2/1998, left 2/1999)
- Tatsuyuki Aoki — drums (died 5/2/1999)
  - Killed in a rail accident.
- Tatsuyuki Hiyamuta — alto saxophone, guitar, vocals (left 7/17/2008)
  - Left to focus on healing and recovery from an injury received to his right foot in Thailand from a motorcycle accident in 1996 that had been hindered by constant travel and performances. He has expressed interest in returning after his recovery has been completed.

Timeline

== Discography ==
=== Studio albums ===
Release date	Publisher	Title	Note
May 1, 1990	Epic Records	Skapara's Intro (スカパラ登場)	
December 1, 1990	Epic Records	Tokyo Ska Paradise Orchestra (東京スカパラダイスオーケストラ)	Re-issue of the debut 12"
June 21, 1991	Epic Records	World-famous (ワールドフェイマス)	
March 21, 1993	Epic Records	Pioneers	
April 21, 1994	Epic Records	Fantasia	
June 21, 1995	Epic Records	Grand Prix	
September 2, 1996	Epic Records	Tokyo Strut (トーキョーストラット)	
August 26, 1998	Avex Trax	Arkestra	
July 26, 2000	Avex Trax	Full-Tension Beaters	also released by Grover Records on July 04, 2003
May 22, 2002	Cutting Edge	Stompin' On Down Beat Alley	
March 5, 2003	Cutting Edge	High Numbers	
March 9, 2005	Cutting Edge	Answer	
June 7, 2006	Cutting Edge	Wild Peace	
March 26, 2008	Cutting Edge	Perfect Future	
February 4, 2009	Cutting Edge	Paradise Blue	
March 10, 2010	Cutting Edge	World Ska Symphony	
October 27, 2010	Cutting Edge	Goldfingers	Mini-Album
March 21, 2012	Avex Entertainment	Walkin'	
November 17, 2012	Cutting Edge	Desire (欲望)	
July 11, 2013		Diamond In Your Heart	
August 13, 2014		Ska Me Forever	
March 8, 2017		Paradise Has No Border	
March 14, 2018		Glorious	
November 20, 2019		Tokyo Ska-Lorful Collage (ツギハギカラフル)	
March 3, 2021		Ska=Almighty	
November 10, 2021		S.O.S. [Share One Sorrow]	
March 15, 2023		JUNK or GEM	
October 23, 2024		35	

=== Singles ===
- Monster Rock - (04/21/1990 Epic Records)
- Countdown To Glory (栄光へのカウントダウン) - (01/21/1991 Epic Records)
- Hole in One (ホールインワン) - (06/21/1991 Epic Records)
- World-famous Remix - 12/25/1991 Epic Records)
- Burning Scale - (12/02/1992 Epic Records)
- Tiger of Marai (マライの號) - (05/01/1993 Epic Records)
- Gold Rush - (08/21/1993 Epic Records)
- Happening (ハプニング) - (10/23/1993 Epic Records)
- Blue Mermaid (ブルーマーメイド) - (12/12/1993 Epic Records))
- Happy Go Lucky - (09/07/1994 Epic Records)
- Tokyo Deluxe (東京デラックス) - (01/21/1995 Epic Records)
- Watermelon - (04/28/1995 Epic Records)
- Jam - (07/21/1995 Epic Records)
- Rock Monster Strikes Back - (07/21/1996)
- Hurry Up!! - (04/21/1997 Epic Records)
- Does Love Exist? (愛があるかい？) - (04/22/1998 Avex Trax)
- Dear My Sister - (07/08/1998 Avex Trax)
- Hinotama Jive (火の玉ジャイヴ) - (05/12/1999 Avex Trax)
- Devote to the Battle Melody (戦場に捧げるメロディー) - (11/17/1999 Avex Trax)
- Filmmakers Bleed ~Decisive Battle on the Summit~ (フィルムメイカーズ・ブリード～頂上決戦～) - (06/21/2000 Cutting Edge)
- Peeled Orange (めくれたオレンジ) - (08/08/2001 Cutting Edge)
- Great Singing Bird Sky (カナリヤ鳴く空) - (12/12/2001 Cutting Edge)
- Beautiful Burning Forest (美しく燃える森) - (02/14/2002 Cutting Edge)
- The Galaxy and Maze (銀河と迷路) - (02/05/2003 Cutting Edge)
- A Quick Drunkard - (06/04/2003 Cutting Edge)
- Map of the World (世界地図) - (05/25/2004 Cutting Edge)
- Stroke of Fate - (07/08/2004 Cutting Edge)
- Farewell My Friend (さらば友よ) - (2004 Cutting Edge) Limited edition sold only at ANSWER TOUR concert venues
- Tsuioku no Lilac (迫憶のライラック) - (12/14/2005 Cutting Edge)
- The Sapphire Star (サファイアの星) - (02/15/2006 Cutting Edge)
- The Star Spangled Night (星降る夜に) - (05/10/2006 Cutting Edge)
- KinouKyouAshita - (10/07/2009 Cutting Edge)
- Ryusei to Ballade (流星とバラード)- (1/27/2010 Cutting Edge)
- Break into the Light～約束の帽子～／The Sharing Song～トリコのテーマ～（3/16/2011 Cutting Edge）
- Sunny Side of the Street (All Good Ska is One/Twinkle Star~Tayorino Hoshi~) (8/3/2011 Avex)
- Tokyo Ska Paradise Orchestra feat. 10-FEET "Senkou" (閃光 feat.10-FEET)- (12/4/2013 Cutting Edge/Justa Record)
- Tokyo Ska Paradise Orchestra feat. MONGOL800 "Nagare Yuku Sekai No Naka De"(流れゆく世界の中で feat.MONGOL800)- (03/12/2014 Cutting Edge/Justa Record)
- Tokyo Ska Paradise Orchestra feat. Asian Kung Fu Generation "Wake Up!"- (07/02/2014 Cutting Edge/Justa Records)
- Mekutta Orenji (爆音ラヴソング/めくったオレンジ) - (07/29/2015 Cutting Edge/Justa Records)
- Uso Wo Tsuku Kuchibiru (嘘をつく唇) - (12/09/2015 Cutting Edge/Justa Records)
- Michi Naki Michi, Hankotsu No (道なき道、反骨の) - (06/22/2016 Cutting Edge/Justa Records)
- Sayonara Hotel (さよならホテル) - (09/07/2016 Cutting Edge/Justa Records)
- Multiple Exposures feat. Yoohei Kawakami Movie Edit. (多重露光) - (12/18/2020 Avex Trax)
- Almighty ~The Masked Promise~ feat. Yoohei Kawakami (ALMIGHTY ~ 仮面の約束) - (12/23/2020 Avex Trax)

=== Vinyl releases ===
- Tokyo Ska Paradise Orchestra (東京スカパラダイスオーケストラ) 12" - (1989 Kokusai Records)
- Skapara's Intro (スカパラ登場) - (1990 Epic Records)
- World-famous (ワールドフェイマス) LP - (06/21/1991 Epic Records)
- World-famous Remix 12" - (10/28/1991 Epic Records)
- Pioneers - (1993 Epic Records) Promo 12" with selections from Pioneers Album
- Just a Little Bit of Tokyo Ska Paradise Orchestra (04/21/1994)
- Happening (ハプニング) 12" - (1995 Epic Records)
- Fantasia - (1995 Epic Records) Promo 12" with selections from Fantasia Album
- Grand Prix - (1995 Epic Records)
- Rock Monster Strikes Back 12" - (08/13/96 Epic Records)
- The Movin' Dub (On the Whole Red Satellites) 7" - (1998 Justa Record)
- Jon Lord 7" - (1998 Justa Record)
- One Night 12" - (1998 Justa Record)
- Ska Jerk 12" - (1998 Justa Record)
- Abracadabra 12" - (1998 Justa Record)
- Ring O' Fire 12" - (1998 Justa Record)
- Jazzie Speaks 12" - (1999 Justa Record)
- Theme of Lupin III Pt. I & II 12" - (2000 Justa Record)
- Best(1989～1997) LP (11/07/2002 Epic Records)
- Afro Art Remixes 12" - (12/2002 Afro Art Records)
- Downbeat Selector 7" Box Set- (2002 Cutting Edge) The 4 Downbeat Alley singles on vinyl
- High Numbers LP - (03/05/2003 Cutting Edge)
- Full-Tension Beaters LP - (07/04/2003 Grover Records)
- Man In The Street / After The Rain 7" - (2014 Justa/Cutting Edge/Jet Set)
- Ska Me Forever LP - (03/02/2015 Nacional Records)
- Wake Up! feat. Asian Kung Fu Generation - (2015 Justa/Cutting Edge/Jet Set)
- Authentic Tokyo Ska 12" - (18/04/2015 Justa/Cutting Edge/Jet Set)

=== Collaborations / splits ===
- Oka o Koete (with Kyōko Koizumi) (1990 Victor Entertainment)
- Akira Bushi Akira no Jin to Paradise (with Akira Kobayashi) (1995)
- Watermelon (with Yukihiro Takahashi (高橋幸宏)) (04/28/1995 Epic Records)
- Beauty & Stupid Tokyo Ska Version (music for hide) (1996)
- Decameron (with Naoto Takenaka) (1997)
- Spanish Hustle (with Malawi Rocks) 12" (2000 Justa Record)
- Mayonaka wa Junketsu (with Ringo Shiina) (2001)
- Hazumu Rhythm (ハズムリズム)(with Puffy) (2006)
- L-O-V-E (with Rico Rodriguez) (2006)
- Secret Code (with KinKi Kids) (2008)
- Olha pro céu (feat) EMICIDA (2016)
- Quem tem um amigo (tem tudo) EMICIDA (2020)
- Rurō no Katashiro (with Masaki Suda) (2023)

=== Live albums ===
- Tokyo Ska Paradise Orchestra Live (東京スカパラダイスオーケストラライブ) (03/21/1991 Epic Records)
- Gunslingers -Live Best- (03/14/2001 Avex Trax)
- On Tour (02/04/2004 Cutting Edge)
- Perfect Future: Live at Montreux Jazz Festival (3/26/08 Cutting Edge) (bonus live cd with first pressing of Perfect Future)
- Live at Budokan-"The Last" (02/03/2016 Cutting Edge)

=== Comp tracks / tributes ===
- Respectable Roosters - A Tribute to The Roosters: "Rosie" (1999)
- Welcome to the Plastic World: "Cards" (1999)
- Ska Stock: Tribute to the Skatalites: "Shot in the Dark" (studio version)
- Punch the Monkey Vol II: "Lupin the 3rd '78" (1999)
- Tribute to Yellow Magic Orchestra: "Simoon" (2004)
- Tribute to Haruomi Hosono: "アブソリュート・エゴ・ダンス" (2007)
- Sirius〜Tribute to UEDA GEN〜: "-6m" (2008)
- Tribute to Unicorn: "I'm a Loser" (2007)
- Tokyo Ska plays Disney (2015)

=== DVD and Blu-Ray ===
- Ska Evangelists On the Run Tokyo Ska Paradise Orchestra 1998>>1999 - (03/29/2000 Avex)
- Down Beat Selector (09/04/2002 Cutting Edge)
- Down Beat Arena～Yokohama Arena (Down Beat Arena～横浜アリーナ7.7.2002(完全版) - (07/7/2002 Cutting Edge)
- Europe Tour 2003 Road-Move DVD (Catch the Rainbow (Europe Tour 2003 ロード・ムーヴィーDVD「Catch the Rainbow」) - (03/03/2004 Cutting Edge)
- Skapara at Cabaret (スカパラatキャバレー) - (03/10/2004 Epic)
- Live Grand Prix - (03/10/2004 Epic)
- 18540617 - (03/10/2004 Epic)
- 15th Anniversary Live Since Debut 2004.10.22 - (01/01/2005 Cutting Edge)
- Wild Peace Tour Final @ Saitama Super Arena (Wild Peace Tour Final @ さいたまスーパーアリーナ) - (05/3/2007 Cutting Edge)
- Smile- A Film by Koichi Makino - (09/12/2007 Cutting Edge)
- and TOKYO SKA goes on... - (3/10/2010 Cutting Edge)
- Tokyo Ska Paradise Kokugikan & Tokyo Ska Paradise Taiikukan Live - (12/12/2010 Cutting Edge)
- Discover Japan Tour - LIVE IN HACHIOJI 2011.12.27 (07/12/2012 Cutting Edge)
- Live at Budokan-"The Last" DVD & Blu-Ray Edition 2015.03.28 (02/03/2016 Cutting Edge)
- "Kanaeta Yume ni Hi wo Tsukete Moyasu LIVE IN KYOTO 2016.4.14" & "Tokyo Ska Jamboree 2016.8.6" Blu-Ray Edition (12/14/2016 Cutting Edge)

=== Videos ===
- Skapara Video (スカパラビデオ) - (12/01/1991 Epic)
- Osamu's Amazing Songs (音曲の乱) - (03/25/1992 Epic)
- TOKYOSKA: Everytime We Say Goodbye - (08/08/1992 Epic)
- World Series from Tokyo Ska - (02/12/1992 Epic)
- Skapara at Cabaret (スカパラatキャバレー) - (12/12/1993 Epic)
- Live Fantasia - (04/21/1994 Epic)
- Video Fantasia - (04/21/1994 Epic)
- Live Grand Prix - (12/01/1995 Epic)
- 18540617 - (11/21/1997 Epic)
- Ska Evangelists On the Run Tokyo Ska Paradise Orchestra 1998-1999 - (11/17/1999 Avex)

=== Soundtracks ===
- Tokyo Deluxe Original Soundtrack (東京デラックスオリジナルサウンドトラック) (1995)
- Incredible Crisis! Original Soundtrack (とんでもクライシス！オリジナルサウンドトラック) (1999)
- New Moral Battle Homicide Original Soundtrack (新仁義なき戦い謀殺オリジナルサウンドトラック) (2003)
- HEROES (One Piece 3D Movie Soundtrack)- (3/16/2011 Cutting Edge)

=== Band compilations ===
- gifted WINTER SELECTION (12/01/1993 Epic Records)
- JUST A LITTLE BIT OF TOKYO SKA PARADISE ORCHESTRA (vinyl)(04/21/1994)
- THE BEST SELECTION (THE BEST SELECTION (タイ盤）(rare) (1996)
- MOODS FOR TOKYO SKA: WE DON'T KNOW WHAT SKA IS (11/21/1997 Epic Records)
- JUSTA RECORD COMPILATION Vol.1 (07/23/1999 Avex Trax)
- BEST(1989～1997) (11/07/2002 Epic Records)
- SKA ME CRAZY: THE BEST Of TSPO (03/14/2005 Anagram Records)
- Tokyo Ska Paradise Orchestra: Best of Tokyo Ska 1998~2007 - 26 songs selected by Kin-ichi Motegi (03/21/2007 Cutting Edge)
- 25th Anniversary Best Album "The Last" (04/03/2015)
- NO BORDER HITS 2025→2001 〜The Best of Tokyo Ska Paradise Orchestra

=== Side projects ===
==== Tsuyoshi Kawakami and His Mood Makers ====
(Tsuyoshi Kawakami, Hajime Omori)

- Tsuyoshi Kawakami and His Mood Makers (川上つよしと彼のムードメイカーズ) - 2001.12.12
- Moodmaker's mood - 2003.08.06
- Floatin Mood - 2004.07.28
- Sparklin' Mood - 2004.12.01
- Mood Inn - 2005.9.14
- Singers Limited - Golden Mood Hits! - 2009.9.13
- Moodsteady - 2010.10.27
- Members' choice MOODY INSTRUMENTALS TOP 10 + 1 - 2011.8.3

==== Sembello ====
(Yuichi Oki)

- Sembellogy - 2003.08.06
- The Second Album - 2004.11.25
- Kairos - 2006.06.07

==== Speed King ====
(TSPO + Fantastic Plastic Machine + Dr Ys + KMP + OCHICHY)

- SPEED KING - 2000.02.21

==== Losalios ====
(Takashi Kato)

- Sekaichizuwa Chinoato - 1999.11.10
- Colorado Shit Dog - 2002.05.01
- School Of High Sense - 2002.10.26
- The End Of The Beauty - 2003.09.03
- ゆうれい船長がハナシてくれた こと - 2005.05.25

==== So Many Tears ====
(Kin-Ichi Motegi, Takashi Kato)

- So Many Tears - (09.2011 Cutting Edge)
- Love and Wander - (07.2013 Cutting Edge)

==== Fishmans ====
(Kin-Ichi Motegi) See Fishmans Page

==== Sfkuank ====
(Nargo & Masahiko Kitahara)

- Sfkuank!!- 2005.12.14
- Stand Up Pleeeease!!- 2006.10.18

==== Compilations curated by band members ====
- Frank Zappa Compiler - 1999
- Big Bang Blow: Japanese Jazz selected By Nargo, M.Kitahara & Gamo of TSPO - 2003
- JUSTA RECORD presents: 'The 3rd Era of Ska~EURO AUTHENTIC SKA COLLECTION' - 2004.07.28
- JUSTA RECORD presents: 'The 3rd Era of Ska~NORTH AMERICAN SKA COLLECTION' - 2005.03.30

== See also ==
- The Leaf Label (for Asa Chang & Junray)
