= Punchline (company) =

Japanese video game developer

Punchline was a Japanese video game developer company. It was founded by former Love-de-Lic employee Yoshiro Kimura and had around 25 employees. Kimura left to work for Marvelous Inc., and later opened a new studio with the name Onion Games.

== Games ==
- 2002: Chulip (PlayStation 2)
- 2006: Rule of Rose (PlayStation 2)
