= UFO: A Day in the Life =

1999 video game

- Developer: Love-de-Lic
- Publisher: ASCII Entertainment
- Designer: Taro Kudou
- Artist: Kazuyuki Kurashima
- Composer: Hirofumi Taniguchi
- Platform: PlayStation
- Release: JP: June 24, 1999
- Genres: Adventure, puzzle
- Mode: Single-player

UFO: A Day in the Life is an adventure puzzle game developed by Love-de-Lic and published by ASCII Entertainment for the PlayStation exclusively in Japan.

Hamster Corporation re-released the game as part of their Console Archives series for the Nintendo Switch 2 and PlayStation 5 on August 6, 2026.

== Gameplay ==
In UFO: A Day in the Life, the player attempts to save a group of 50 fellow aliens who have been stranded on Earth after crashing into an apartment building. However, due to the effects of electromagnetic waves and chlorofluorocarbon gas flying around, the aliens are invisible, and the player is unable to actually see the alien they are trying to rescue. To this effect, the player must use a device called "Cosmo Scanner," a kind of camera, to reveal the creatures.

Once a certain number of photographs have been taken (or the time runs out), the player character returns to the ship to develop the pictures. This is done by giving the negatives to a giant floating head called "Mother." As more aliens are rescued, more areas open up and different times of day are available for exploration.

== Development ==
UFO: A Day in the Life was designed primarily by Taro Kudou. The game was announced and shown at the Tokyo Game Show in 1999. The game's music was composed by Love-de-Lic's internal sound team The Thelonious Monkeys, comprising Hirofumi Taniguchi and Masanori Adachi.

== Release ==
The soundtrack was released as the UFO: A Day in the Life Original Sound Tracks on a single 23-track disc, published by Sunday Records.

== Reception ==
Famitsu gave the game a score of 29 out of 40.
