= Animax Taishō =

Japanese anime scriptwriting competition

Animax Taishō (アニマックス大賞, Animakkusu Taishō), also known as Animax Awards, is a Japanese anime scriptwriting competition organized by the Japanese anime satellite television network, Animax, a subsidiary of Sony Pictures Entertainment.

== History and broadcasts ==
Held annually since 2002, the competition awards the best original anime scripts submitted across Japan, judged by a panel of noted manga artists, animators and anime creators, which has included Ryōsuke Takahashi and Kaiji Kawaguchi among others, and which subsequently gets animated into an anime by a noted Japanese animation studio for broadcast on Animax's networks the following year. Winners of the Animax Award have gone on to forge successful careers in the anime and manga industry, with the second award winner, Yūko Kawabe going on to co-write Ergo Proxy and Tweeny Witches, among others, while the fourth winner, Ikuko Yoshinari, went on to publish a shōjo manga for Ribon.

The first four award-winning screenplays were animated by each of Animax's co-founders, the studios Sunrise, Toei Animation, and Tokyo Movie Shinsha, while the fifth and seventh were animated by Production I.G and the sixth animated by Sony's A-1 Pictures. In 2007, the awards were made open to Animax's viewers across its networks worldwide, under the name Animax Awards, with one of the winning scripts going on to be animated into the anime movie LaMB.

The seventh iteration of the award, in 2008, was won by Kenji Saidō, for his entry Shoka (lit. "Calligraphy"), and will be animated by Production I.G and to be broadcast on Animax's networks in 2009. The seventh iteration of the competition received a record of 1,235 entries, the largest in the competition's seven-year history, and its judging panel included manga artist Kaiji Kawaguchi, Detroit Metal City film screenwriter Mika Ōmori and Densha Otoko film screenwriter Arisa Kaneko. The award ceremony for the seventh iteration was also broadcast in Japan on November 9, 2008.

== Winners ==
=== Super Kuma-san ===
Super Kuma-san (スーパークマさん; lit. Super Bear)—the first winner of the annual Animax Taishō in 2002.

- Original concept/story: Hiromasa Tani (谷大将, Tani Hiromasa)
- Director: Yukio Kaizawa
- Character design: Daisuke Yoshida
- Cast: Taiki Matsuno, others.
- Production: Toei Animation

=== Azusa, Otetsudai Shimasu! ===
Azusa, Otetsudai Shimasu! (アズサ、お手伝いします!; lit. Azusa Will Help!)—the second winner of the annual Animax Taishō in 2003.

- Original concept/story: Yūko Kawabe (川邊優子, Kawabe Yūko)
- Director: Hajime Kamegaki
- Original character design: Rie Nakajima
- Cast: Mamiko Noto, others.
- Production: Tokyo Movie Shinsha (TMS Entertainment)

=== Hotori ~ Tada Saiwai wo Koinegau ===
Hotori ~ Tada Saiwai wo Koinegau (ほとり〜たださいわいを希う。〜; lit. Hotori ~ I Only Want Happiness)—the third winner of the annual Animax Taishō in 2004.

- Original concept/story: Maya Miyazaki (宮崎麻耶, Miyazaki Maya)
- Director: Takeshi Annō
- Character design: Shin'ichi Yamashita
- Creative producer: Ryōsuke Takahashi
- Cast: Ryōko Shiraishi, others.
- Production: Sunrise

=== Lily to Kaeru to (Ototo) ===
Lily to Kaeru to (Ototo) (リリとカエルと(弟), Riri to Kaeru to (Ototo)) lit. Lily and the Frog and (Little Brother))—the fourth winner of the annual Animax Taishō in 2005. A manga adaptation was serialized in Shueisha's Ribon shōjo magazine.

- Original concept/story: Ikuko Yoshinari (吉成郁子, Yoshinari Ikuko)
- Director: Yuriko Kado
- Character design: Kozue Komatsu
- Cast: Chinami Nishimura, others
- Production: Toei Animation

=== Yumedamaya Kidan ===
Yumedamaya Kidan (ゆめだまや奇談; lit. Strange Stories of a Dream Ball Seller)—the fifth winner of the annual Animax Taishō in 2006. Animated by Production I.G., the script was the first winner not to be animated by one of Animax's co-founding studios.

- Original concept/story: Tsukino Akari (月野あかり, Akari Tsukino)
- Director: Itsurō Kawasaki
- Original character design: Yōsuke Takahashi
- Character design: Shōko Nakamura
- Cast: Yūka Iguchi
- Production: Production I.G

=== Takane no Jitensha ===
Takane no Jitensha (タカネの自転車; lit. Takane's Bike)—the sixth winner of the annual Animax Taishō in 2007. This was the first Animax Taishō to be open to an international audience as it was made available to Animax's broadcast networks worldwide. It was animated by A-1 Pictures, which was also established by one of Sony's subsidiaries, Aniplex. The supervising animation director and character designer was Sachiko Kamimura and featured Maaya Sakamoto as the title character.

- Original concept/story: Hayato Takamaga (タカマガハヤト, Takamaga Hayato)
- Director: Naru Ikeda
- Character design: Sachiko Kamimura
- Cast: Maaya Sakamoto, others.
- Production: A-1 Pictures

== See also ==
- List of animation awards
- Animax
