= Giftpia =

2003 video game

- Developer: Skip Ltd.
- Publisher: Nintendo
- Director: Kenichi Nishi
- Producers: Shigeru Miyamoto; Hiroshi Suzuki
- Designer: Sayoko Yokote; Hiroshi Moriyama
- Artist: Furu Furi Company
- Composer: Hirofumi Taniguchi
- Platform: GameCube
- Release: JP: April 25, 2003
- Genre: Adventure
- Mode: Single-player

Giftpia (ギフトピア, Gifutopia), stylized as GiFTPiA, is a video game, developed by Skip Ltd. for the GameCube. It was released in Japan on April 25, 2003. Nintendo cancelled the North American localization of Giftpia. In English, the game would most likely be better understood as called "Giftopia" to represent the two words, gift and utopia.

== Plot and gameplay ==
Giftpia follows the protagonist Pokkle, a resident of Nanashi Island, who, on the day of his coming of age ceremony, oversleeps and misses the whole thing. The mayor of the island, Mayer, is so incensed that he orders Pokkle's arrest and a fine of five million "Mane" (the game's currency) to recoup the costs of the event. Thus, it is up to Pokkle to work off his huge debt. At the game's start, Pokkle must cope with heavy restrictions: an early curfew, a ball & chain, having his face pixelated, and having robot police chief Mappo supervise him. Throughout his adventure, Pokkle is assisted by his dog Tao and his girlfriend Kyappy. There is also a large cast of supporting characters that live on Nanashi Island and interact with Pokkle, including a bartender that goes by Peevee and a radio DJ called DEEJ. Pokkle eventually encounters an old man who will give him some mushroom soup and teach him about other paths to adulthood via helping others.

Giftpia is similar to Nintendo's Animal Crossing in that both games place an emphasis on interacting with other characters. In order to meet the game's five million Mane requirement, the player must initially take menial jobs such as fishing, collecting fruit, or repairing signs. After meeting the old man, the player must travel the island, collecting its residents' wishes, and fulfill them. However, the player has numerous restrictions that are lifted as the game progresses. For instance, if the player stays out after curfew, ghosts will chase Pokkle to his house. If he does not make it back, he will be put to sleep, making him vulnerable to theft. The player is also responsible for making Pokkle eat, as he will otherwise starve to death.

== Development ==
GiFTPiA was announced in early 2002 under the development of Skip Ltd. and the direction of former Square employee Kenichi Nishi. Game designer Shigeru Miyamoto signed on as one of the game's producers. According to the Japanese newspaper Nihon Keizai Shimbun, Nintendo provided half of the game's ¥500 million budget.

External videos
- E3 2003 - Show Floor Games - Giftpia, Game Sack

Although the game was shown at E3 2003 in English and a North American localization seemed likely, the game remained exclusive to Japan. Nintendo stated that the game was not announced for a North America release. The website IGN stated that "inside sources" claimed the game's translation was cancelled due to being "too strange" for US audiences. Additionally, an unsourced aside in a Nintendo Power interview with Skip over their later game Chibi-Robo! stated "the game was deemed so trippy that it never came out in the US". One of the game's planners, Sayoko Yokote, hoped the game would be localized by a company other than Nintendo.

The music in GiFTPiA is provided via the in-game radio known as Nanashi-FM. The musical score was co-composed by Hirofumi Taniguchi and Yousuke Obitsumi and features over a dozen musical artists on the radio stations. The soundtrack was released on July 14, 2003, by Enterbrain alongside the Giftpia Book, a 99-page full color guide to the game.

== Reception ==
Retail sales of Giftpia were unexceptional at best. According to estimates from Media Create and Dengeki, the game sold between 48,000 and 55,000 units during its first three weeks on sale in Japan. By the end of 2003, the game had sold nearly 70,000 units, ranking it 176th among all games in the country for that year.

Giftpia was given a total score of 34 out of 40 by Famitsu, earning it a "Gold Award". The reviewers remarked that although game gives the initial impression it is for children, it offers "nice puzzle elements, great characters and a wonderful score". GiFTPiA was awarded a curious review score of ??% by the UK-based NGC Magazine. They felt unable to review it properly, but were sure that there was "...clearly a quite brilliant game lurking beneath the reams of Japanese text".
