= Love-de-Lic =

Japanese video game developer

Love-de-Lic, Inc.
- Native name: ラブデリック
- Company type: Private
- Industry: Video games
- Founded: 1995
- Defunct: 2000
- Fate: Dissolved
- Successors: Onion Games; Punchline; Skip Ltd.; Vanpool
- Headquarters: Tokyo, Japan
- Key people: Kenichi Nishi
- Products: See games
- Website: lovedelic.co.jp at the Wayback Machine (archived May 31, 2001)

Love-de-Lic, Inc. (ラブデリック, Rabuderikku), stylised as LOVE•de•LIC, was a Japanese video game developer founded by Kenichi Nishi in 1995. The staff was composed primarily of former Square employees. The company folded in 2000, and many of its employees went on to establish other game companies, including Skip Ltd., Vanpool, and Punchline.

Former staff members Yoshiro Kimura, Kazuyuki Kurashima, and Hirofumi Taniguchi currently manage the game company Onion Games, which created original games such as Dandy Dungeon: Legend of Brave Yamada, and published Moon: Remix RPG Adventure on modern platforms.

The company's name was inspired by Nishi's love for Yellow Magic Orchestra, notably the album Technodelic.

== Games ==
Year	Title	Publisher	Platform
1997	Moon: Remix RPG Adventure	ASCII Corporation (PS1); Onion Games (NS, Win, PS4, Mac)	PlayStation, Nintendo Switch, Windows, PlayStation 4, macOS
1999	UFO: A Day in the Life	ASCII Corporation	PlayStation
2000	L.O.L.: Lack of Love	ASCII Corporation	Dreamcast

== Staff ==
- Kenichi Nishi
- Taro Kudo
- Akira Ueda
- Yoshiro Kimura
- Keita Eto
- Kazayuki Kurashima
- Hirofumi Taniguchi
- Hiroshi Suzuki
