= Moon: Remix RPG Adventure =

1997 video game

- Original cover
- Developer: Love-de-Lic
- Publishers: ASCII Entertainment (PS1); Onion Games
- Designers: Kenichi Nishi; Taro Kudo; Yoshiro Kimura
- Artist: Kazuyuki Kurashima
- Writers: Yoshiro Kimura; Taro Kudo
- Composers: Hirofumi Taniguchi; Taro Kudo; Masanori Adachi
- Platforms: PlayStation; Nintendo Switch; Microsoft Windows; PlayStation 4; MacOS
- Release: PlayStation: JP: October 16, 1997; Nintendo Switch: JP: October 10, 2019; WW: August 27, 2020; Windows, PS4: WW: December 16, 2021; MacOS: WW: January 28, 2022
- Genres: Role-playing, adventure
- Mode: Single-player

Moon: Remix RPG Adventure (Note: Japanese: ムーンリミックスRPGアドベンチャー, Hepburn: Moon Rimikkusu RPG Adobencha) is a 1997 role-playing adventure game developed by Love-de-Lic and published by ASCII Entertainment for the PlayStation. Moon is set within a fictional role-playing game where "the hero" has wreaked destruction, killing hundreds of creatures and looting homes. The player takes on the role of a supporting character in this world, attempting to undo the damage done by the hero. Moon has been praised by critics for how it parodies the conventions and tropes of role-playing games.

Although it was not officially localized for many years, it influenced Toby Fox for the design of his 2015 game Undertale. After speaking with Fox, original designer Yoshiro Kimura was inspired to localize Moon. In 2019, Onion Games released a port for the Nintendo Switch, which was localized and published in Western territories in 2020, and later ported to Windows and PlayStation 4 in 2021, with a MacOS port arriving in early 2022.

== Gameplay ==
Gameplay screenshot

Time follows a set calendar that runs in real time. Solarday, a day-off, is the equivalent to Sunday. Crescenday is Monday, Blazeday is Tuesday, Tearsday is Wednesday, Leavesday is Thursday, Coinsday is Friday, and Echoday is like Saturday. The world's inhabitants (and the animal's souls, too) follow their own regular schedules each week. Hero leaves behind the corpses of the animals he has killed all over the world. Boy must catch the soul that manifests, whereupon the soul is whisked away to the Moon and the Boy obtains "Love". A soul appears during a certain time of day each week.

The player increases Boy's Love Level by discovering the secret wishes of Real Moon's people. Boy must then grant the idiosyncratic wishes of each person. Sometimes Love comes from readily apparent events, but there are secret and time-limited events Boy must fulfill. "Love" grows by levels. The player preserves progress by going to bed and entering a dream state. By leveling up Boy, the time he can exist in the world (his "action limit") increases. When Boy's "action limit" falls to zero, the player gets a game over.

In the game, the player can change the background music at nearly any time. One can purchase or find "MoonDiscs" (M.D.), each of which grants one new song performed by commercial artists. Some locations, of course, have programmatic music. The player can also collect other special items. "Name cards" are cards featuring the in-game characters, which reveal information and hints about their background and wishes. "Chips" are integral to the game's story. They act as sacred texts that reveal the past, the present, and the future of Real Moon. The player must decide what to do based on the words and pictures featured on the chips.

== Plot ==
Moon begins with the protagonist, a small boy, playing a new role-playing game (RPG) called "Moon" (a.k.a. "Fake Moon") on his "Gamestation". The game begins with the player controlling the Hero of Fake Moon in a 10-minute game-within-a-game, Fake Moon being something of a parody of Japanese RPGs (JRPGs) of the 16-bit era. Convoluted JRPG stories are skewered by the minutes of a nonsensical backstory, which Boy skips through before the player can read it. Queen Aphrodite has been abducted and taken to the moon. The perpetrator, Dragon, will wreak millions of calamitous years upon the people of Love-De-Gard with her power. Yet, the people have produced a hero who must travel to Dragon Castle and destroy the beast. After playing through a few typical RPG scenes (random battles, an airship sequence, etc.), the boy is ordered by his mother to go to bed and obediently does so. However, the television on which he was just playing Fake Moon switches back on by itself, and the boy is sucked into the world of Moon, a land called "Love-de-Gard". Its people and its story resembles Fake Moon's.

== Development ==
Moon: Remix RPG Adventure is the first of three games developed by Love-de-Lic, a game developer made up of former members of Square. After leaving Square, the group worked on the game ambitiously for over two years. It was first previewed in Weekly Famitsu on May 23, 1997. Moon was co-directed by Yoshiro Kimura, Taro Kudo, and Kenichi Nishi. The game's backgrounds and maps were designed by Akira Ueda. Character and monster designs were handled by Kazuyuki Kurashima.

=== Music ===
The soundtrack to Moon was composed by over 30 independent Japanese musicians, perhaps the most prominent of which is The Thelonious Monkees, Love-de-Lic's internal name for its sound team, headed by Hirofumi Taniguchi. He would later compose music for Love-de-Lic's other games, as well the games from its spin-off companies. The game's musical score is a wide mix of genres ranging from pop music to traditional Japanese koto music, as well as having both instrumental and vocal tracks. One of the gameplay mechanics of Moon called the "MoonDisc" (MD) player even allows the person playing the game to arrange their own soundtrack with up to 36 pieces of music, for certain situations during the story.

The first of Moon's soundtracks was released on a single disc in 1997 alongside the game itself, but many of the MD tracks were absent, most likely due to legal issues from the many artists that composed the music. In December 2002, a three-disc set titled The Sketches of Moondays: We Kept Our Promise To You was released by Sten Och Flod and Underground Liberation Force Records. The set contains all of the game's music in a total of 63 tracks. One of its tracks, "Promise", was remixed for the 2001 Melody of Legend: Chapter of Love compilation disc. In 2006, Olio Music, an online music store, re-published both albums, as well as releasing two compilation albums: one containing arranged music from the game, and one containing new music composed by the "MoonDisc" artists.

== Release ==
The game was first released for PlayStation on October 16, 1997, and was re-released as part of the PlayStation the Best line on November 5, 1998. A companion book titled Moon: Official Book was also released by ASCII. Another book titled Tsukiyo No Aho Dori: Moon Side Story was released by Jugemu Books. It features a story by Yoshiro Kimura and illustrations by Kazuyuki Kurashima.

Moon was featured prominently at ASCII's E3 booth in 1997 with plans to release the game internationally the following year, but ASCII canceled localization plans later that year. English fan translations were attempted but never completed.

=== Modern port ===
In the Japanese Nintendo Direct in September 2019, Yoshiro Kimura's development studio Onion Games announced a Nintendo Switch port of the game, which was released in Japan on October 10 of that year. Afterwards, the studio said via Twitter that this version would receive an English localization, to be released in Western regions some time after the Japanese release. Tim Rogers, formerly of Kotaku, was a writer of the English translation. It was released worldwide on August 27, 2020. This version was later released worldwide for Microsoft Windows and PlayStation 4 on December 16, 2021, and MacOS on January 28, 2022.

== Reception ==
Reception

Aggregate score
Aggregator	Score
Metacritic	77/100 (NS)

Review scores
Publication	Score
Destructoid	7.5/10 (NS)
Famitsu	32/40 (PS)
GameSpot	8/10 (NS)
Nintendo Life	7/10 (NS)
Nintendo World Report	8.5/10 (NS)
RPGFan	(PS) 99% (NS) 92/100
Dengeki PlayStation	55/100, 60/100, 70/100, 70/100

Moon was among Famitsu's list of best reviewed games for the PlayStation by 2000.

== Legacy ==
Moon was praised for its innovation breaking the norm of conventional role-playing games, parodying many aspects of the genre itself. It has been described as an "anti-RPG" for the way it subverts RPG tropes. The premise of Moon is considered to be ahead of its time. It is an example of the Isekai genre of Japanese fantasy fiction, with its plot involving the protagonist being sucked into the fantasy-themed virtual world of a role-playing game. The game's designer and writer, Yoshiro Kimura, went on to create Chulip (2002) and Little King's Story (2009), and founded the indie game studio Onion Games.

Indie developer Toby Fox cited Moon as a major inspiration behind his 2015 role-playing video game Undertale. While he had not actually played the game because it was in Japanese, he was inspired by the game's concepts. He noted that Moon was "an adventure game where you enter the world of an RPG where a 'Hero' has caused havoc" and "the point of the game is to repair the damage the 'Hero' caused and increase your LV" (Love Level) "by helping people instead of hurting them".
