= List of Story of Seasons video games =

The Story of Seasons video game series was originally produced by Victor Interactive Software (acquired by Marvelous Entertainment in 2002), with Natsume Inc. handling the English translation and distribution in North America. The series debuted in Japan on August 9, 1996, with Bokujō Monogatari (牧場物語-, lit. "The Farm Story"), which later was released in the North American and PAL regions as Harvest Moon. Story of Seasons is a series of farm simulation/role-playing video games where the main objective is to maintain a farm over a period of time, tending the crops and livestock throughout the seasons, while befriending the nearby townsfolk and getting married in some games. Story of Seasons titles have been released on numerous different video game consoles and handheld game consoles. Several titles have been re-released on multiple platforms as special editions which include an updated gameplay. Fourteen spin-off titles have been released, featuring related elements. One of these titles, Rune Factory: A Fantasy Harvest Moon, was released to mark the 10th anniversary of the Story of Seasons series. One reason the Story of Seasons series has remained popular is because of the unchanged core system of the games. According to Yasuhiro Wada, Story of Seasons' lead designer, it has been the development team's response to the audience's requests which has allowed the series to maintain its popularity.

Due to Natsume Inc. keeping the rights to the Harvest Moon name when Marvelous decided to have their own American division, Xseed Games, take over North American distribution, the newer titles in the series had to be renamed to Story of Seasons while Natsume Inc. took the opportunity to start their own Harvest Moon series of similar games starting with Harvest Moon: The Lost Valley. This has reportedly caused some degree of confusion among players and fans of the series.

== Main series ==
Game	Details
Harvest Moon Original release date(s): JP: August 9, 1996; AU: March 1, 1997; NA: June 1997; EU: January 29, 1998	Release years by system: 1996 – Super Nintendo Entertainment System (Super Famicom); 2008 – Virtual Console; 2023 – Nintendo Switch Online
Harvest Moon Original release date(s): JP: August 9, 1996; AU: March 1, 1997; NA: June 1997; EU: January 29, 1998	Notes: Known in Japan as Bokujō Monogatari (牧場物語; lit. 'Farm Story'); Also released online via the Satellaview system for the Super Famicom
Harvest Moon GB Original release date(s): JP: December 18, 1997; NA: August 1998; EU: 1998	Release years by system: 1997 – Game Boy; 1999 – Game Boy Color; 2013 – 3DS Virtual Console
Harvest Moon GB Original release date(s): JP: December 18, 1997; NA: August 1998; EU: 1998	Notes: Known in Japan as Bokujō Monogatari GB (牧場物語 GB; lit. 'Farm Story GB'); An updated version for the Game Boy Color was released later under the name Harvest Moon GBC
Harvest Moon 64 Original release date(s): JP: February 5, 1999; NA: December 22, 1999; EU: February 23, 2017	Release years by system: 1999 – Nintendo 64; 2017 – Virtual Console
Harvest Moon 64 Original release date(s): JP: February 5, 1999; NA: December 22, 1999; EU: February 23, 2017	Notes: Known in Japan as Bokujō Monogatari 2 (牧場物語2; lit. 'Farm Story 2')
Harvest Moon 2 GBC Original release date(s): JP: August 6, 1999; NA: November 18, 2000; PAL: March 30, 2001	Release years by system: 1999 – Game Boy Color; 2014 – 3DS Virtual Console
Harvest Moon 2 GBC Original release date(s): JP: August 6, 1999; NA: November 18, 2000; PAL: March 30, 2001	Notes: Known in Japan as Bokujō Monogatari GB2 (牧場物語 GB2; lit. 'Farm Story GB2')
Harvest Moon: Back to Nature Original release date(s): JP: December 16, 1999; NA: November 2000; PAL: January 26, 2001	Release years by system: 1999 – PlayStation; 2008 – PlayStation 3, PlayStation Portable (PlayStation Network)
Harvest Moon: Back to Nature Original release date(s): JP: December 16, 1999; NA: November 2000; PAL: January 26, 2001	Notes: Known in Japan as Bokujō Monogatari Harvest Moon (牧場物語～ハーベストムーン～, Bokujō Monogatari: Hābesuto Mūn; lit. 'Farm Story: Harvest Moon'); Rereleased for the PlayStation 3 and PlayStation Portable via PlayStation Network on December 24, 2008 in Japan; Rereleased in North America for the PlayStation 3 and PlayStation Portable via the PlayStation Network in 2011
Harvest Moon 3 GBC Original release date(s): JP: September 29, 2000; NA: November 14, 2001	Release years by system: 2000 – Game Boy Color; 2014 – 3DS Virtual Console
Harvest Moon 3 GBC Original release date(s): JP: September 29, 2000; NA: November 14, 2001	Notes: Known in Japan as Bokujō Monogatari GB3: Boy Meets Girl (牧場物語GB3 ボーイ・ミーツ・ガール, Bokujō Monogatari GB3: Bōi Mītsu Gāru; lit. "Farm Story GB3: Boy Meets Girl")
Bokujō Monogatari Harvest Moon for Girl Original release date(s): JP: December 7, 2000	Release years by system: 2000 – PlayStation
Bokujō Monogatari Harvest Moon for Girl Original release date(s): JP: December 7, 2000	Notes: Literal Japanese translation, "The Farm Story: Harvest Moon for Girl" (牧場物語～ハーベストムーン～forガール, Bokujō Monogatari: Hābesuto Mūn for Gāru); Same setting and gameplay as Harvest Moon: Back to Nature, but with a female character; Rereleased in Japan via PlayStation Network On December 24, 2008
Harvest Moon: Save the Homeland Original release date(s): JP: July 5, 2001; PAL: October 2001; NA: November 20, 2001	Release years by system: 2001 – PlayStation 2; 2011 – PlayStation 3 (PlayStation Network)
Harvest Moon: Save the Homeland Original release date(s): JP: July 5, 2001; PAL: October 2001; NA: November 20, 2001	Notes: Known in Japan as Bokujō Monogatari 3: Heart ni Hi o Tsukete (牧場物語3~ ハートに火をつけて, Bokujō Monogatari: Hāto ni Hi o Tsukete; lit. 'Ranch Story: Ignite the Fire in Heart'); Rereleased in North America for the PlayStation 3 via PlayStation Network in 2011
Harvest Moon: Friends of Mineral Town Original release date(s): JP: April 18, 2003; NA: November 17, 2003; PAL: March 26, 2004	Release years by system: 2003 – Game Boy Advance
Harvest Moon: Friends of Mineral Town Original release date(s): JP: April 18, 2003; NA: November 17, 2003; PAL: March 26, 2004	Notes: Known in Japan as Bokujō Monogatari: Mineral Town no Nakama-tachi (牧場物語 ミネラルタウンのなかまたち, Bokujō Monogatari: Mineraru Taun no Nakama-tachi; lit. "Farm Story: Companions of Mineral Town")
Harvest Moon: A Wonderful Life Original release date(s): JP: September 12, 2003; NA: March 16, 2004; PAL: March 26, 2004	Release years by system: 2003 – GameCube; 2004 – PlayStation 2
Harvest Moon: A Wonderful Life Original release date(s): JP: September 12, 2003; NA: March 16, 2004; PAL: March 26, 2004	Notes: Known in Japan as Bokujō Monogatari: Wonderful Life (牧場物語～ワンダフルライフ, Bokujō Monogatari: Wandafuru Raifu; lit. 'Farm Story: Wonderful Life'); An updated edition was published for the PlayStation 2, Known as Bokujō Monogatari: Oh! Wonderful Life Tsūjō-ban (牧場物語 Oh!ワンダフルライフ通常版; lit. 'Farm Story: Oh! Wonderful Life (Special Edition)') in Japan and Harvest Moon: A Wonderful Life Special Edition in English-speaking countries
Harvest Moon: More Friends of Mineral Town Original release date(s): JP: December 12, 2003; NA: July 26, 2005	Release years by system: 2003 – Game Boy Advance
Harvest Moon: More Friends of Mineral Town Original release date(s): JP: December 12, 2003; NA: July 26, 2005	Notes: Known in Japan as Bokujō Monogatari: Mineral Town no Nakama-tachi for Girl (牧場物語ミネラルタウンのなかまたちforガール, Bokujō Monogatari: Mineraru Taun no Nakama-tachi for Gāru; lit. "Farm Story: Companions of Mineral Town for Girl"); "Female version" of Harvest Moon: Friends of Mineral Town
Harvest Moon: Another Wonderful Life Original release date(s): JP: July 8, 2004; NA: July 26, 2005	Release years by system: 2004 – GameCube
Harvest Moon: Another Wonderful Life Original release date(s): JP: July 8, 2004; NA: July 26, 2005	Notes: Known in Japan as Bokujō Monogatari: Wonderful Life for Girls (牧場物語ワンダフルライフforガール, Bokujō Monogatari: Wandafuru Raifu for Gāru; lit. 'Farm Story: Wonderful Life for Girl'); Updated version of Harvest Moon: A Wonderful Life starring a female protagonist
Bokujō Monogatari: Shiawase no Uta Original release date(s): JP: March 3, 2005	Release years by system: 2005 – GameCube
Bokujō Monogatari: Shiawase no Uta Original release date(s): JP: March 3, 2005	Notes: Literal Japanese translation "The Farm Story: Happy Poem" (牧場物語 しあわせの詩) also known as Harvest Moon: Poem of Happiness; Japanese version of Magical Melody
Harvest Moon DS Original release date(s): JP: March 17, 2005; NA: September 12, 2006; PAL: April 13, 2007	Release years by system: 2005 – Nintendo DS
Harvest Moon DS Original release date(s): JP: March 17, 2005; NA: September 12, 2006; PAL: April 13, 2007	Notes: Known in Japan as Bokujō Monogatari: Colobocle Station (牧場物語 コロボックルステーション, Bokujō monogatari: Korobokkuru Sutēshon; Farm Story: Colobocle Station); First Story of Seasons game released on Nintendo DS
Harvest Moon: Magical Melody Original release date(s): JP: November 10, 2005; NA: March 28, 2006; EU: November 24, 2006	Release years by system: 2005 – GameCube; 2008 – Wii
Harvest Moon: Magical Melody Original release date(s): JP: November 10, 2005; NA: March 28, 2006; EU: November 24, 2006	Notes: Known in Japan as Bokujō Monogatari: Shiawase no Uta for World (牧場物語 しあわせの詩forワールド, Bokujō Monogatari: Shiawase no Uta for Wārudo; lit. "Farm Story: Happy Poem for World"); An expanded edition of Bokujō Monogatari: Shiawase no Uta, featuring extra content; Released for Wii in 2008 for PAL Region Territories and in 2009 for North America
Harvest Moon: Boy & Girl Original release date(s): JP: November 23, 2005	Release years by system: 2005 – PlayStation Portable; 2012 – PlayStation Vita
Harvest Moon: Boy & Girl Original release date(s): JP: November 23, 2005	Notes: Known in Japan as Bokujō Monogatari: Harvest Moon Boy and Girl (牧場物語ハーベストムーン ボーイ&ガール; lit. "The Farm Story: Harvest Moon Boy & Girl"); It is a compilation of Harvest Moon: Back to Nature and Bokujō Monogatari Harvest Moon for Girl; Released on PlayStation Network in 2008; In August 2012, it was released for the PlayStation Vita via the PlayStation Plus service
Harvest Moon DS Cute Original release date(s): JP: December 8, 2005; NA: March 25, 2008	Release years by system: 2005 – Nintendo DS
Harvest Moon DS Cute Original release date(s): JP: December 8, 2005; NA: March 25, 2008	Notes: Known in Japan as Bokujō Monogatari: Colobocle Station for Girls (牧場物語コロボックルステーションforガール, Bokujō Monogatari: Korobokkuru Sutēshon for Gāru; Ranch Story: Colobocle Station for Girls); Same town and gameplay as Harvest Moon DS, except the main character is a girl
Harvest Moon DS: Island of Happiness Original release date(s): JP: February 1, 2007; NA: August 26, 2008; EU: December 12, 2008; AU: March 26, 2009	Release years by system: 2007 – Nintendo DS
Harvest Moon DS: Island of Happiness Original release date(s): JP: February 1, 2007; NA: August 26, 2008; EU: December 12, 2008; AU: March 26, 2009	Notes: Known in Japan as Bokujō Monogatari: Kimi to Sodatsu Shima (牧場物語 キミと育つ島)
Harvest Moon: Tree of Tranquility Original release date(s): JP: June 7, 2007; NA: September 30, 2008; EU: October 9, 2009; AU: October 22, 2009	Release years by system: 2007 – Wii
Harvest Moon: Tree of Tranquility Original release date(s): JP: June 7, 2007; NA: September 30, 2008; EU: October 9, 2009; AU: October 22, 2009	Notes: Known in Japan as Bokujō Monogatari: Yasuragi no Ki (牧場物語 やすらぎの樹; lit. "The Farm Story: Tree of Serenity"); Also known as Harvest Moon Heroes and Harvest Moon: Tree of Peace
Harvest Moon DS: Sunshine Islands Original release date(s): JP: February 21, 2008; NA: November 10, 2009; EU: December 3, 2010; AU: December 23, 2010	Release years by system: 2008 – Nintendo DS
Harvest Moon DS: Sunshine Islands Original release date(s): JP: February 21, 2008; NA: November 10, 2009; EU: December 3, 2010; AU: December 23, 2010	Notes: Known in Japan as Bokujō Monogatari: Kira Kira Taiyou to Nakama Tachi (牧場物語 キラキラ太陽となかまたち; lit. "The Farm Story: Sun and Companions")
Harvest Moon: Animal Parade Original release date(s): JP: October 30, 2008; NA: November 10, 2009; EU: December 3, 2010; AU: December 23, 2010	Release years by system: 2008 – Wii
Harvest Moon: Animal Parade Original release date(s): JP: October 30, 2008; NA: November 10, 2009; EU: December 3, 2010; AU: December 23, 2010	Notes: Known in Japan as Bokujō Monogatari: Waku Waku Animal March (牧場物語わくわくアニマルマーチ; lit. "The Farm Story: Exciting Animal March")
Harvest Moon DS: Grand Bazaar Original release date(s): JP: December 18, 2008; NA: August 24, 2010; EU: September 30, 2011	Release years by system: 2008 – Nintendo DS
Harvest Moon DS: Grand Bazaar Original release date(s): JP: December 18, 2008; NA: August 24, 2010; EU: September 30, 2011	Notes: Literal Japanese translation, "The Farm Story: Welcome! To The Wind's Bazaar" (牧場物語 ようこそ！風のバザールへ)
Harvest Moon: Hero of Leaf Valley Original release date(s): JP: March 19, 2009; NA: April 26, 2010; EU: November 12, 2010	Release years by system: 2009 – PlayStation Portable; 2012 – PlayStation Vita
Harvest Moon: Hero of Leaf Valley Original release date(s): JP: March 19, 2009; NA: April 26, 2010; EU: November 12, 2010	Notes: Known in Japan as Bokujō Monogatari: Sugar Mura to Minna no Negai (牧場物語シュガー村と皆の願い; lit. "The Farm Story: Sugar Village and Everyone's Wish"); Released for the PlayStation Vita via the PlayStation Plus service on August 24, 2012
Harvest Moon: The Tale of Two Towns Original release date(s): JP: July 8, 2010; NA: September 20, 2011; EU: June 29, 2012; AU: July 5, 2012	Release years by system: 2010 – Nintendo DS; 2011 – Nintendo 3DS
Harvest Moon: The Tale of Two Towns Original release date(s): JP: July 8, 2010; NA: September 20, 2011; EU: June 29, 2012; AU: July 5, 2012	Notes: Literal Japanese translation, "The Farm Story: Twin Villages" (牧場物語 ふたごの村); First Story of Seasons game released on Nintendo 3DS
Harvest Moon 3D: A New Beginning Original release date(s): JP: February 23, 2012; NA: November 6, 2012; EU: September 20, 2013; AU: November 14, 2013	Release years by system: 2012 – Nintendo 3DS
Harvest Moon 3D: A New Beginning Original release date(s): JP: February 23, 2012; NA: November 6, 2012; EU: September 20, 2013; AU: November 14, 2013	Notes: Literal Japanese translation, "The Farm Story: Land of Beginning" (牧場物語 はじまりの大地)
Story of Seasons Original release date(s): JP: February 27, 2014; NA: March 31, 2015; EU: December 31, 2015; AU: January 9, 2016	Release years by system: 2014 – Nintendo 3DS
Story of Seasons Original release date(s): JP: February 27, 2014; NA: March 31, 2015; EU: December 31, 2015; AU: January 9, 2016	Notes: First game in the series to use the Story of Seasons name in North America
Story of Seasons: Trio of Towns Original release date(s): JP: June 23, 2016; NA: February 28, 2017; PAL: October 13, 2017	Release years by system: 2016 – Nintendo 3DS
Story of Seasons: Trio of Towns Original release date(s): JP: June 23, 2016; NA: February 28, 2017; PAL: October 13, 2017	Notes: Also known as Story of Seasons: Good Friends of Three Villages, Story of Seasons: Cherished Friends of Three Towns.
Story of Seasons: Friends of Mineral Town Original release date(s): JP: October 17, 2019; NA: July 14, 2020; EU: July 10, 2020	Release years by system: 2019 – Nintendo Switch; 2020 – Microsoft Windows; 2021 – PlayStation 4, Xbox One
Story of Seasons: Friends of Mineral Town Original release date(s): JP: October 17, 2019; NA: July 14, 2020; EU: July 10, 2020	Notes: Known in Japan as Bokujō Monogatari: Saikai no Mineral Town.; Remake of Harvest Moon: Friends of Mineral Town and Harvest Moon: More Friends of Mineral Town.; First game in the main series playable on PC.
Story of Seasons: Pioneers of Olive Town Original release date(s): JP: February 25, 2021; NA: March 23, 2021; PAL: March 26, 2021	Release years by system: 2021 – Nintendo Switch, Microsoft Windows; 2022 – PlayStation 4
Story of Seasons: Pioneers of Olive Town Original release date(s): JP: February 25, 2021; NA: March 23, 2021; PAL: March 26, 2021	Notes: Known in Japan as Bokujō Monogatari: Olive Town to Kibō no Daichi (牧場物語 オリーブタウンと希望の大地, Bokujō Monogatari Orību Taun to Kibō no Daichi; lit. 'Farm Story: Olive Town and the Land of Hope').
Story of Seasons: A Wonderful Life Original release date(s): JP: January 26, 2023; NA: June 27, 2023; EU: June 27, 2023	Release years by system: 2023 – Nintendo Switch, Microsoft Windows, PlayStation 5, Xbox Series X/S
Story of Seasons: A Wonderful Life Original release date(s): JP: January 26, 2023; NA: June 27, 2023; EU: June 27, 2023	Notes: Known in Japan as Bokujō Monogatari Welcome! Wonderful Life (牧場物語 Welcome！ワンダフルライフ; lit. 'Farm Story: Welcome! Wonderful Life'); Remake of Harvest Moon: A Wonderful Life and Harvest Moon: Another Wonderful Life.
Story of Seasons: Grand Bazaar Original release date(s): WW: August 27, 2025	Release years by system: 2025 – Nintendo Switch, Nintendo Switch 2, Microsoft Windows; 2026 – PlayStation 5, Xbox Series X/S
Story of Seasons: Grand Bazaar Original release date(s): WW: August 27, 2025	Notes: Remake of Harvest Moon: Grand Bazaar.

== Related games ==
There are 14 spin-off games under the Harvest Moon series featuring related elements or characters.

Game	Details
BS Bokujō Monogatari Original release date(s): JP: September 2, 1996	Release years by system: 1996 – Super Nintendo Entertainment System (Super Famicom) (Satellaview)
BS Bokujō Monogatari Original release date(s): JP: September 2, 1996	Notes: Full Japanese title is BS Bokujō Monogatari (BS 牧場物語; lit. "BS Farm Story"); It was an episodically released ura- or gaiden-version of the original Harvest Moon featuring "SoundLink" narration; Online Satellaview emulation enthusiasts refer to the game unofficially as "BS Makiba Monogatari"
Harvest Moon Online Original release date(s): Unreleased	Release years by system: Unreleased
Harvest Moon Online Original release date(s): Unreleased	Notes: Announced in 2005 by Marvelous Interactive; Was supposed to be released for a "next-generation platform" in 2006; Was supposed to be producer Yoshifumi Hashimoto's first online title
Innocent Life: A Futuristic Harvest Moon Original release date(s): JP: April 27, 2006; AU: March 22, 2007; NA: May 15, 2007; EU: May 18, 2007	Release years by system: 2006 – PlayStation Portable; 2007 – PlayStation 2; 2012 – PlayStation Vita
Innocent Life: A Futuristic Harvest Moon Original release date(s): JP: April 27, 2006; AU: March 22, 2007; NA: May 15, 2007; EU: May 18, 2007	Notes: Known in Japan as Innocent Life: Shin Bokujō Monogatari (イノセントライフ ～新牧場物語～) and in Australia as Harvest Moon: Innocent Life; It is a futuristic Harvest Moon spin-off, in which the game takes place on a relic-filled island which can be explored by walking or biking; A special edition was released for the PlayStation 2 known as Innocent Life: A Futuristic Harvest Moon (Special Edition) in North America and in Japan; On October 15, 2009 it was released for the PlayStation Portable via the PlayStation Network; In August 2012 it was released for the PlayStation Vita via the PlayStation Plus service
Rune Factory series	Release years by system: 2006 – Nintendo DS (Rune Factory: A Fantasy Harvest Moon); 2008 – Nintendo DS (Rune Factory 2: A Fantasy Harvest Moon); 2008 – Wii (Rune Factory Frontier); 2009 – Nintendo DS (Rune Factory 3); 2011 – PlayStation 3, Wii (Rune Factory: Tides of Destiny); 2012 – Nintendo 3DS (Rune Factory 4); 2019/2020 – Nintendo Switch (Rune Factory 4 Special); 2021 – Nintendo Switch (Rune Factory 5); 2025 – Nintendo Switch 2, Nintendo Switch (Rune Factory: Guardians of Azuma)
Rune Factory series	Notes: A spin-off series featuring fantasy and dungeon crawl components; Described as "Harvest Moon where you wield a sword" by producer Yoshifumi Hashimoto; Rune Factory 2: A Fantasy Harvest Moon is the last Rune Factory game to be affiliated with the Harvest Moon series as Rune Factory will now work as an independent series; Rune Factory 2: A Fantasy Harvest Moon was originally intended to be released without the Harvest Moon subtitle in order for Rune Factory to grow into an independent series, however Natsume Inc. applied the subtitle A Fantasy Harvest Moon for its North American release
Puzzle de Harvest Moon Original release date(s): NA: November 6, 2007	Release years by system: 2007 – Nintendo DS
Puzzle de Harvest Moon Original release date(s): NA: November 6, 2007	Notes: Puzzle de Harvest Moon is a spin-off puzzle game which uses farm-related activities from the role-playing games of the series
Harvest Moon: My Little Shop Original release date(s): JP: April 28, 2009; NA: November 23, 2009	Release years by system: 2009 – Wii (WiiWare)
Harvest Moon: My Little Shop Original release date(s): JP: April 28, 2009; NA: November 23, 2009	Notes: Known in Japan as Bokujō Monogatari Series: Makiba no Omise (牧場物語シリーズ まきばのおみせ, lit. The Farm Story Series: The Farm Store); It is the first WiiWare title in Harvest Moon series; The gameplay is more featured on the management of a store but still features farming
Harvest Moon: Frantic Farming Original release date(s): NA: August 7, 2009	Release years by system: 2009 – iOS (iPhone, iPod Touch, iPad), Nintendo DS; 2010 – BlackBerry
Harvest Moon: Frantic Farming Original release date(s): NA: August 7, 2009	Notes: Harvest Moon: Frantic Farming is the second puzzle game in the series following Puzzle de Harvest Moon; It is the first game in the series to be released for iOS and BlackBerry
Minna de Bokujou Monogatari Original release date(s): JP: November 25, 2010	Release years by system: 2010 – Web browser
Minna de Bokujou Monogatari Original release date(s): JP: November 25, 2010	Notes: Literal Japanese translation, "The Farm Story With Everyone" (みんなで牧場物語); It is a free browser-based game based on the series
Hometown Story Original release date(s): NA: October 22, 2013; EU: May 2, 2014; JP: December 12, 2013; AU: July 24, 2014	Release years by system: 2013 – Nintendo 3DS
Hometown Story Original release date(s): NA: October 22, 2013; EU: May 2, 2014; JP: December 12, 2013; AU: July 24, 2014	Notes: A spin-off franchise based more on store management than farming
Return to PopoloCrois: A Story of Seasons Fairytale Original release date(s): NA: March 1, 2016; JP: June 18, 2015; PAL: February 18, 2016	Release years by system: 2015/2016 – Nintendo 3DS
Return to PopoloCrois: A Story of Seasons Fairytale Original release date(s): NA: March 1, 2016; JP: June 18, 2015; PAL: February 18, 2016	Notes: A spin-off/crossover with PoPoLoCrois, telling a story not yet covered in that franchise while mixing RPG elements into the main formula
Doraemon Story of Seasons Original release date(s): JP: June 13, 2019; WW: October 11, 2019	Release years by system: 2019 – Nintendo Switch, Microsoft Windows; 2020 – PlayStation 4
Doraemon Story of Seasons Original release date(s): JP: June 13, 2019; WW: October 11, 2019	Notes: A spin-off/crossover with Doraemon, gameplay follows the mainline Story of Seasons games, but features characters and special items from the Doraemon series.; Published by Bandai Namco Entertainment in all regions.
Doraemon Story of Seasons: Friends of the Great Kingdom Original release date(s): JP: November 2, 2022	Release years by system: 2022 – Microsoft Windows, Nintendo Switch, PlayStation 5
Doraemon Story of Seasons: Friends of the Great Kingdom Original release date(s): JP: November 2, 2022	Notes: Another spin-off/crossover with Doraemon, gameplay follows the mainline Story of Seasons games, but features characters and special items from the Doraemon series.; Published by Bandai Namco Entertainment in all regions.

== See also ==
- Legend of the River King, a fishing-themed role-playing game series also developed by Marvelous.
