= Yasuhiro Wada (video game designer) =

Japanese video game designer and producer

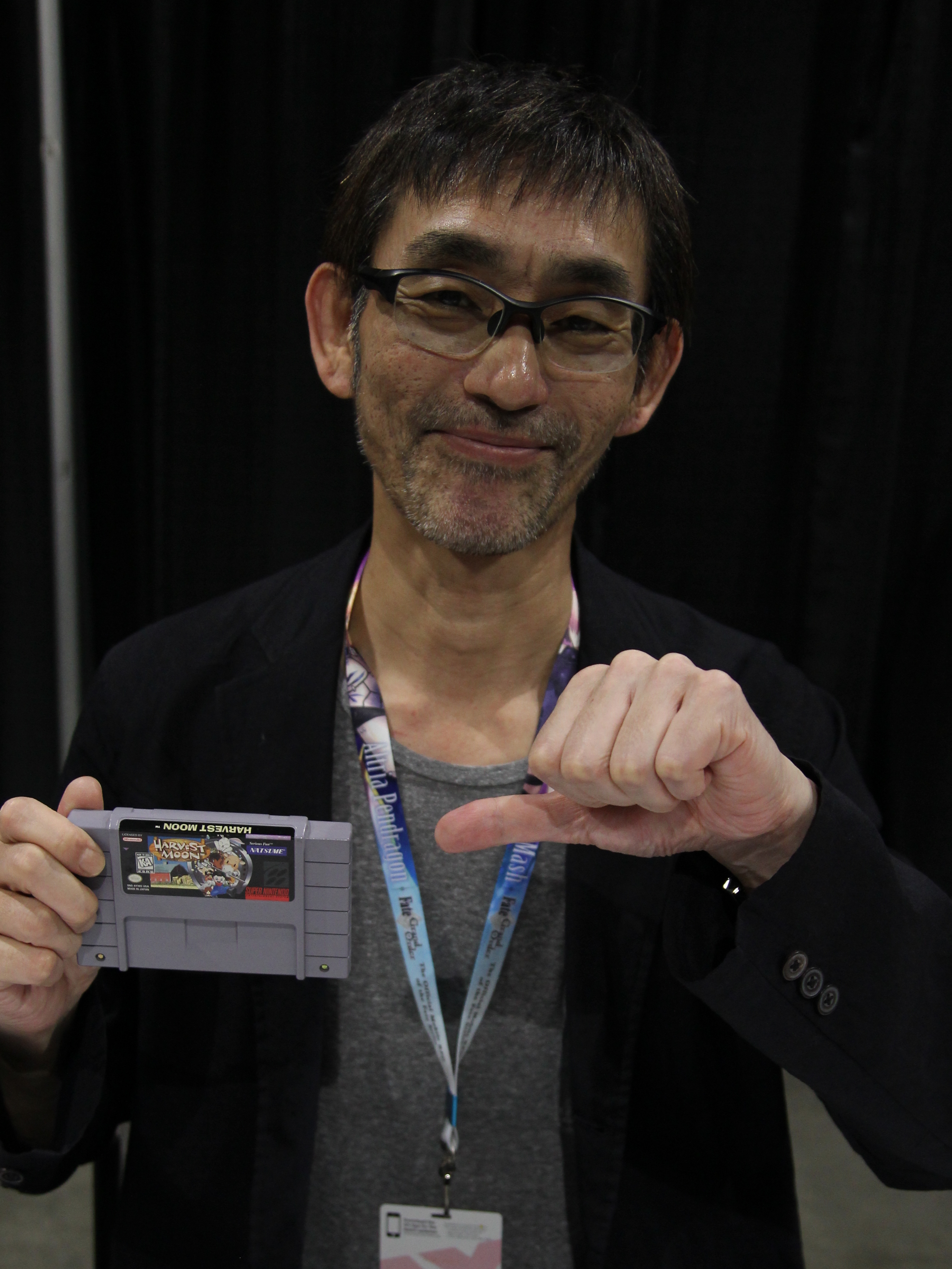
- Occupations: Game developer; game designer; artist
- Known for: Harvest Moon, Story of Seasons

Yasuhiro Wada (Japanese: 和田康宏, Hepburn: Wada Yasuhiro) is a Japanese video game designer and producer. He is known for his work on the Story of Seasons series (formerly known as Harvest Moon). In 2009, he stopped work on the series to pursue other projects.

== Career ==
Yasuhiro Wada was the producer of the 1995 Super Famicom game Magical Pop'n. He also worked as the designer on the game Harvest Moon. Harvest Moon is a farming game, with gameplay that is not focused on combat or competition. Wada felt he needed to make games that were different from those of his predecessors, and he drew on his experience growing up in rural life.

In 2005, he was the president of Marvelous Interactive. In 2008, he was the Chief Commercial Officer of Marvelous Entertainment. In 2010, he joined Grasshopper Manufacture as COO. He then left Grasshopper and founded the company Toybox in 2011.

Wada was the producer for the game Birthdays the Beginning.

He worked on the game Little Dragons Café. The game is a cafe-management and dragon-raising simulator.

== Personal Life ==
Wada was born on March 8th 1966 in the rural town of Miyazaki in Kyushu, Japan.

== Works ==
| Year | Game title | Role |
|---|---|---|
| 1995 | Magical Pop'n | Producer |
| 1996 | Harvest Moon | Producer |
| 1997 | Harvest Moon GB | Producer, game designer |
| 1999 | Harvest Moon 64 | Producer, sound director |
| 1999 | Harvest Moon 2 GBC | Producer |
| 1999 | Harvest Moon: Back to Nature | Director, producer |
| 2000 | Harvest Moon 3 GBC | Producer, supervisor |
| 2000 | Bokujō Monogatari Harvest Moon for Girl | Producer, Funny Fish Modeler |
| 2001 | Harvest Moon: Save the Homeland | Producer, Funny Fish Modeler |
| 2003 | Harvest Moon: A Wonderful Life | Producer, Funny Fish Modeler |
| 2003 | Harvest Moon: Friends of Mineral Town | Producer, game designer |
| 2003 | Harvest Moon: More Friends of Mineral Town | Executive Producer |
| 2004 | Harvest Moon: Another Wonderful Life | Executive Producer |
| 2005 | Harvest Moon DS | Executive Producer |
| 2005 | Harvest Moon: Magical Melody | Executive producer, game designer |
| 2005 | Harvest Moon DS Cute | Executive producer |
| 2005 | Harvest Moon: A Wonderful Life Special Edition | Executive producer |
| 2006 | Innocent Life: A Futuristic Harvest Moon | Executive producer |
| 2006 | Rune Factory: A Fantasy Harvest Moon | Executive producer |
| 2007 | Harvest Moon DS: Island of Happiness | Executive producer |
| 2007 | Harvest Moon: Tree of Tranquility | Executive producer |
| 2008 | Rune Factory 2 | Executive producer |
| 2008 | Harvest Moon: Animal Parade | Producer |
| 2008 | Rune Factory: Frontier | Executive producer |
| 2009 | Harvest Moon: My Little Shop | Producer |
| 2013 | Hometown Story | Director, producer |
| 2017 | Birthdays the Beginning | Producer, game designer |
| 2018 | Little Dragons Café | Producer |
| 2024 | Natsu-Mon: 20th Century Summer Kid | Producer |
