= Cattails (video game) =

2017 video game

- Developer: Falcon Development
- Engine: GameMaker
- Platforms: Microsoft Windows; MacOS; Linux; Nintendo Switch
- Release: December 1, 2017: Windows, MacOS and Linux; December 1, 2017; Nintendo Switch; November 29, 2018
- Genres: Role-playing video game; survival game; life simulation game
- Mode: Single-player

Cattails is a 2017 role-playing video game developed by Falcon Development for Microsoft Windows, MacOS, Linux and Nintendo Switch. The game follows an abandoned housecat who joins one of three feral cat colonies and builds relationships with its members and their neighboring colonies. A sequel, Cattails: Wildwood Story, was released in 2023.

The player can hunt, forage, and fight, with their actions affecting how the other colonies view them. Several NPCs can be romanced, which can lead to marriage and kittens. The game has a pixel art visual style and is viewed from a fixed top-down camera angle.

Cattails received mixed reception for its pleasant art style and soundtrack, and enjoyable exploration, but lackluster story and combat. The game has been compared to Stardew Valley and Animal Crossing, and the lead developer, Tyler Thompson, has cited Story of Seasons and the book series Warriors as influences.

== Gameplay ==
Cattails's gameplay is open-ended, allowing the player to explore, hunt prey, fight battles, and gain reputation within their chosen faction. The game has a difficulty setting that can be changed at any time, and character skills (hunting, swimming, fighting and foraging) that can be leveled up with experience points, as well as special active skills that have a timed cooldown, such as a temporary speed boost or a healing ability. There are two meters relevant to the player's survival: their hunger, which affects your energy and can be filled by catching and eating prey, and their health, which can be increased using medicinal herbs that can be collected around the map. The world is divided into tiles, each of which can be controlled by one of the three factions.

The player can also romance a selection of NPCs, which can have kittens with the protagonist if they're successfully wooed, who can tag along on adventures. Other NPCs serve as shopkeepers, or as potential friends to chat with. The player can either gain the respect of their neighboring colonies through gifts, or provoke them through attacks. There are also seasonal festivals in which the player can participate in minigames to win prizes such as unique coat colors or a pet for their character. A later update added the task boards, which provide the player with optional daily quests in exchange for task tokens.

== Plot ==
Cattails begins with the protagonist (a house cat) being abandoned on the side of the road. A stray named Coco finds them and helps them settle in to one of three colonies of feral cats: the Forest Colony, the Mountain Colony, and the Mystic Colony. The protagonist eventually comes into contact with a supernatural force known as the Forest Guardian, who tasks them with solving various puzzles and collecting items and offering them at an altar in order to restore balance to the forest. Completing the Forest Guardian's quests unlocks the ability to create your own colony.

== Development ==
Cattails is the debut project from Indianapolis-based husband-and-wife duo Falcon Development. It began development in May of 2016, with funding from a Kickstarter campaign with over a thousand backers and almost $40,000 pledged, over twelve times the duo's original goal. It uses the GameMaker engine. The game released on Microsoft Windows, MacOS and Linux on December 1, 2017, and on Nintendo Switch on November 29, 2018. A sequel, Cattails: Wildwood Story, was released in 2023.

In an interview with GameSkinny, Falcon Development lead Tyler Thompson explains that Cattails was loosely inspired by an earlier project of his, a Warriors fan game entitled Warrior Cats: Untold Tales. Another mentioned source of inspiration is Story of Seasons. The visuals of the game are in a pixel art style with a fixed top-down camera.

== Reception ==
Reception

Aggregate scores
Aggregator	Score
Metacritic	75/100
OpenCritic	69% recommend

Review scores
Publication	Score
Nintendo Life	8/10
Nintendo World Report	7.5/10
Pocket Gamer	2.5/5

Cattails received mixed reviews from critics. Neal Ronaghan of Nintendo World Report calls the combat system "mostly chaotic cat tussles where you spam the attack button", but nonetheless praises the exploration, saying the game has "hidden areas galore". Both he and Digitally Downloaded's Tyler T. applauds the game's hunting mechanics for requiring stealth, though the latter notes its simplicity. Tyler goes on to call the game's combat "stiff and unsatisfying", something he says really hurts the experience of Cattails.

Writing for Pocket Gamer, Dave Aubrey says that Cattails is "directionless", that the combat "doesn't work" and that the overall experience is frustrating. In a review for COGconnected, Patrick Anderson describes the game's survival aspects as well-balanced, musing that he never felt like "a slave to the survival wheel". Siliconera's Jenni Lada writes that "the objectives that you set for yourself" are the most fun aspect of Cattails.

Nintendo Life author Gavin Lane describes the game as a "calm, disarming experience". The art and soundtrack are points of acclaim, with Ronaghan crediting them for adding to the "relaxing playfulness" of the game. Lane agrees, saying the "tranquil" soundtrack helps to set the game's peaceful tone. The game's style has been compared to that of Stardew Valley and Animal Crossing, while The Mary Sue's Madeline Carpou compares the game's world and plot to that of young adult novel series Warriors. In a feature for PC Gamer, Lauren Morton rejects the Stardew Valley comparisons, instead calling the game "Risk but with cats". IGN's Tom Marks writes Cattails is "an adorably silly game, but one that's also a lot of fun".
