= Harvest Moon DS =

2005 video game

- Developer: Marvelous Interactive
- Publishers: JP: Marvelous Interactive; NA: Natsume Inc.; EU: Rising Star Games
- Producer: Yoshifumi Hashimoto
- Series: Story of Seasons
- Platform: Nintendo DS
- Release: March 17, 2005: Harvest Moon DS; JP: March 17, 2005; NA: September 12, 2006; EU: April 13, 2007; AU: June 7, 2007; Harvest Moon DS Cute; JP: December 8, 2005; NA: March 25, 2008
- Genres: Simulation, role-playing
- Mode: Single-player

Harvest Moon DS, known in Japan as Bokujō Monogatari: Colobocle Station (牧場物語 コロボックルステーション, Bokujō Monogatari: Korobokkuru Sutēshon), is a farm simulation role-playing video game for the Nintendo DS, part of the Story of Seasons series. It was published and developed by Marvelous Interactive Inc., and released in Japan on March 17, 2005, and in North America on September 12, 2006. It is the first entry in the series without series creator Yasuhiro Wada heavily involved, though it borrows many assets from Harvest Moon: Friends of Mineral Town and Harvest Moon: A Wonderful Life, such as the graphical style from the former and setting of the latter.

== Plot ==
The player is a young man (who is by default named Pete) who lives with his friend Takakura on a farm in Forget-Me-Not-Valley, at roughly the same time as Harvest Moon: Friends of Mineral Town. The game begins with the Harvest Goddess, a deity of Harvest Moon, and the Witch Princess fighting. Neither can win, so they part ways. The Witch Princess, on meeting the Harvest Goddess next, attempts to cast a spell to silence her, but instead petrifies her. While trying to undo her spell, the Witch Princess inadvertently sends the Harvest Goddess to another world, so she sends all of the Harvest Sprites (small, elf-like creatures) to the same world to rescue her. The Witch Princess then tells the player to bring all of the Harvest Sprites back in order to rescue the Harvest Goddess; to do this, the player must work hard as a farmer.

Living in the valley are a number of villagers, nine bachelorettes, and five rival bachelors. The characters and locations in Harvest Moon DS are the same as those in Harvest Moon: A Wonderful Life and Harvest Moon: Friends of Mineral Town, along with a few new characters, but with a few minor exceptions.

The main story ends when all Harvest Sprites and the Harvest Goddess are rescued.

== Gameplay ==
Players earn money primarily through their farm, by growing crops or raising livestock. Growing crops is slightly different from previous Harvest Moon games; rather than being restricted to their own farm land, the player may grow crops on unowned fields of various sizes and fertility all over the valley. Each crop must be planted during a certain season; for example, turnips must be planted in the spring. Players begin the game with only a dog and a cat on their farm. While the cat does little, the dog may be trained to fetch balls and chase away wild dogs from the farm. Cows, sheep, ducks, and chickens are available for purchase and must be housed in different types of pens, which must be bought from Gotz, the town's woodcutter. Cows and sheep require an animal shed to live in before they may be purchased, and ducks and chickens require a bird shed. After the player ships 1000 items, Takakura will bring him a horse to keep. This horse does not need to be fed and cannot get sick. However, it can be brushed to increase its affection towards the player.

After earning enough money, the player may upgrade their house by calling Gotz and buy a kitchen, appliances or furniture items by using the Harvest Sprite Shopping Network. If players upgrade their home twice, buy certain items, and rescue 60 Harvest Sprites, they may choose to marry. If the wife's affection is kept high for a season after marriage, she will become pregnant and give birth two seasons later. The game skips forward by three years after the birth, resulting in changes in the villagers' lives but no change to the player's farm.

Extra content, as well as characters from Harvest Moon: Friends of Mineral Town, can be unlocked by inserting a copy of Harvest Moon: Friends of Mineral Town or More Friends of Mineral Town into the slot 2 of an original DS or DS Lite. However, marrying any of the bachelorettes from Mineral Town results in the game ending immediately, placing the player back at the last save after the wedding.

There are a total of 101 Harvest Sprites to be rescued. They belong to different teams based on what skills they have (such as fishing or watering crops) and are divided into two sets. The first set of Harvest Sprite teams can be hired to help the player after its rescue. The second set of teams cannot be hired and fulfills specific purposes, such as running the casino or television stations. Rescuing the Harvest Sprites requires various farm related activities. Activities related to a Harvest Sprite's skill will generally result in its rescue.

== Release ==
Japanese versions of Harvest Moon DS can only connect to their Japanese counterparts, and while this feature is not available on PAL Harvest Moon DS cartridges, NTSC Harvest Moon DS cartridges can connect with PAL and NTSC Harvest Moon: Friends of Mineral Town cartridges.

Instead of offering poker and blackjack in the Harvest Sprite Casino, in PAL games all three sprites offer memory matching.

== Reception ==
Harvest Moon DS

Aggregate score
Aggregator	Score
Metacritic	67/100

Review scores
Publication	Score
Eurogamer	5/10
Famitsu	30/40
GameSpot	5.9/10
GameSpy	3/5
GameZone	9.2/10
IGN	6/10
Nintendo Power	6/10
Pocket Gamer	3/5
Retro Gamer	70%
RPGFan	73%

The game received "average" reviews according to the review aggregation website Metacritic. In Japan, Famitsu gave it a score of one seven, one nine, and two sevens for a total of 30 out of 40.

== Harvest Moon DS Cute ==
Harvest Moon DS Cute, known in Japan as Bokujō Monogatari: Colobocle Station for Girls (牧場物語コロボックルステーションforガール, Bokujō Monogatari Korobokkuru Sutēshon for Gāru), is a version of Harvest Moon DS centered on a female main character. It was published and developed by Marvelous Interactive Inc. and first released in Japan on December 8, 2005. Harvest Moon DS Cute replaces the male protagonist from Harvest Moon DS with a female character. Players may choose either Pony from Harvest Moon: Another Wonderful Life or Claire from Harvest Moon: More Friends of Mineral Town. Basic gameplay remains unaltered in comparison to the original version.

The plot of Harvest Moon DS Cute is different from that of Harvest Moon DS. In this version of the game, the player's mother sends a wish to the Harvest Goddess that they may be a successful farmer. The Harvest Goddess eventually determines the player has no work ethic and tells the Harvest King what she thinks. The Harvest King angrily tells the Harvest Goddess she isn't trying hard enough and slacking off in her old age. The Harvest Goddess then calls the Harvest King a "big baldy" and is turned into stone. The Harvest Sprites defend the Harvest Goddess, which angers the Harvest King even more, and he sends the Harvest Sprites and the Harvest Goddess to another world as punishment, but realizes his mistake as he has gone too far. He then writes a letter to the player and sends the Witch Princess to deliver it, telling them that if they works hard as a farmer, it will bring back the Harvest Sprites and the Harvest Goddess. Like in Harvest Moon DS, the main story ends when the player successfully returns all the Harvest Sprites and the Harvest Goddess.

The Japanese version introduced a system not present in the North American version known as the "Best Friend" system. This allowed the player to marry only the four "special" bachelorettes from Harvest Moon DS, as well as any of the bachelors.

=== Reception ===
Harvest Moon DS Cute

Aggregate score
Aggregator	Score
Metacritic	66/100

Review scores
Publication	Score
IGN	5.8/10
Nintendo Power	7.5/10

Harvest Moon DS Cute received "average" reviews according to Metacritic.
