= Puzzle de Harvest Moon =

2007 video game

- Developer: Platinum-Egg Inc.
- Publisher: Natsume Inc.
- Series: Harvest Moon
- Platform: Nintendo DS
- Release: NA: November 6, 2007
- Genre: Puzzle
- Modes: Single-player; Multiplayer

Puzzle de Harvest Moon is a spin-off puzzle video game in the Harvest Moon series. It was developed by Platinum-Egg Inc. and published by Natsume Inc. on November 6, 2007.

== Gameplay ==
Puzzle de Harvest Moon is a strategy game in which the object is to harvest plants from a small field shared by four players. Farm animals the player periodically receives give special abilities in a small area; for example the dog protects an area for a short period of time from other players harvesting.

Puzzle de Harvest Moon features characters from Harvest Moon: Back to Nature as playable characters, four single-player modes, and multi-player mode where up to four players can play together, with one game cartridge.

== Reception ==
Reception

Aggregate score
Aggregator	Score
Metacritic	41/100

Review score
Publication	Score
GameSpot	4/10

Puzzle de Harvest Moon received mostly negative reviews, receiving an aggregate score of 41/100 from Metacritic. The critics claimed that the puzzle gameplay is unfitting for a Harvest Moon game. It also received criticism for its tutorial, which was claimed to make the game more confusing, and for not having a story for single player mode or any extended play modes. GameSpot refers to it as a scribbling exercise.
