= Innocent Life: A Futuristic Harvest Moon =

2006 video game

- Developer: ArtePiazza
- Publishers: JP: Marvelous Interactive; NA: Natsume Inc.; EU/AU: Rising Star Games
- Director: Sachiko Sugimura
- Producer: Takeshi Ogura
- Artist: Shintaro Majima
- Writers: Chie Yokota; Keigo Yamaguchi
- Composers: Yutaka Minobe; Yasufumi Fukuda
- Platforms: PlayStation Portable, PlayStation 2
- Release: April 27, 2006: PSP; JP: April 27, 2006; AU: March 22, 2007; NA: May 15, 2007; EU: May 18, 2007 PlayStation 2; JP: March 29, 2007; NA: February 12, 2008
- Genre: Simulation/role-playing
- Mode: Single-player

Innocent Life: A Futuristic Harvest Moon (イノセントライフ ～新牧場物語～, Inosento Raifu ～Shin Bokujō Monogatari～), also known as Harvest Moon: Innocent Life, is a 2006 farming simulation video game for the PlayStation Portable (PSP). It is a spin-off of the Story of Seasons series of games, and was released on April 27, 2006, in Japan and in 2007 for the rest of the world.

A special edition of the game was released for the PlayStation 2 (PS2) called Innocent Life: A Futuristic Harvest Moon (Special Edition) (新牧場物語：ピュア イノセントライフ, Shin Bokujō Monogatari: Pyua Inosento Raifu) on March 29, 2007, in Japan and February 12, 2008, in North America. Apart from minor changes, the PS2 version is essentially a port of the original.

== Gameplay ==
The game takes place on the relic-filled Heartflame Island which can be explored by walking or riding on a buggy. Players have the ability to explore the island's ruins and even visit a volcano. All these areas have their own terrain and resembles a tropical paradise. In order to explore all over the island, the player must collect jewels and break the seals.

Aside from growing plants and raising livestock, the player has weekly requests from Volcano Town for help with a job.

== Plot ==
On Heartflame Island, a heart-shaped island with a volcano, a scientist named Dr. Hope Grain has created an android boy (the player, who is by default named Life) to serve as a rancher for the island. After getting to know Dr. Hope and a girl named Marcia, the player moves to the Easter Ruins to begin his life as a rancher. He also learns of a company called the Banks Corporation has plans to stop the volcano's eruption, which will destroy the island, but the plan soon backfires. During a meeting between Dr. Hope and the mayor, the player and Marcia learn of the player's origins, but Dr. Hope and his maid Vita explain their purpose of why he is created. The player later learns that the island is watched over by three deities: the Forest Spirit, the Water Spirit, and the Fire Spirit. Two ancient races: the Easter People and the Volcano People, had fought each other in the past and to defeat their enemies, the Easter People tricked the Forest Spirit into helping them steal the Crest of the Water Spirit to strengthen their power. The Spirits, angered by their actions, cut off all resources from their lands and the Water Spirit imprisoned the Forest Spirit as punishment for helping the Easter People. The Easter People eventually died out and the survivors fled the island.

Learning that the Fire Spirit is causing the volcano's eruption and only the Water Spirit can stop it, the player makes it his goal to save the island (not succeeding in this in time will result in the island being destroyed). After finding the Crest of the Water Spirit, the player also meets a hag who gives him the Crest of the Forest Spirit, and later meets two Nature Sprites, who are the split forms of the Forest Spirit. However, there is one Nature Sprite who will only appear in a very special event. Dr. Hope eventually falls ill; this causes the third Nature Sprite to appear. After bringing the Nature Sprites the Crest of the Forest Spirit, they merge to retake the form of the Forest Spirit, who opens the way to the tower near Mermaid Lake. With the hag's help, the player returns the Crest of the Water Spirit to the tower. The Water Spirit, grateful of the player's help, advices him to put the Crest of the Fire Spirit on the Ice Grail located on the Alter of Ice in order to calm it down. After finding the Crest of the Fire Spirit, the player heads to the Alter of Ice to put the Crest there, which summons the Fire Spirit. The Water Spirit calms down its wrath, averting the island's destruction. Back in town, the mayor thanks the player for saving the town and he goes to see Dr. Hope, who is also grateful before dying, causing the player to shed a tear, showing that he has become a human somewhat.

In the post credits scene, Marco, the CEO of Banks Corporation, wonders what went wrong with his plans before suddenly coming up with another idea.

== Development ==
The game features a new art style that steps away from the traditional style of the previous Harvest Moon games. It focuses more on solving a main storyline like traditional RPGs, rather than concentrating on farm works. The concept used in Innocent Life would be continued on the Rune Factory series, which also involved ARPG battles. However, the removal of the marriage system in this installment also departs from any previous or later game in the Harvest Moon/Story of Seasons series except for Harvest Moon GB, Harvest Moon 2 GBC, and Harvest Moon: Save the Homeland

== Reception ==
Reception

Aggregate score
Aggregator	Score	
Aggregator	PS2	PSP
Metacritic	63/100	67/100

Review scores
Publication	Score	
Publication	PS2	PSP
Electronic Gaming Monthly	N/A	5.83/10
Eurogamer	N/A	7/10
Famitsu	N/A	29/40
Game Informer	N/A	7.25/10
GameRevolution	N/A	C+
GameSpot	N/A	5.3/10
GameSpy	N/A	2.5/5
GameZone	N/A	7.9/10
IGN	6/10	(UK) 6.9/10 (US) 6.5/10
Pocket Gamer	N/A	3/5
PlayStation: The Official Magazine	N/A	8/10
RPGamer	N/A	4/5
RPGFan	76%	76%

Both Innocent Life and its Special Edition received "mixed or average reviews" according to the review aggregation website Metacritic. IGN said of the former in its U.S. review that the story develops slowly and the gameplay strays too far from Harvest Moon's traditional farming focus. In Japan, Famitsu gave the PSP original a score of one eight and three sevens for a total of 29 out of 40.
