= Harvest Moon 3D: A New Beginning =

2012 video game

- North American cover art
- Developer: Marvelous AQL
- Publishers: JP: Marvelous AQL; NA: Natsume Inc.; EU: Marvelous Europe
- Director: Takahiro Yura
- Producer: Yoshifumi Hashimoto
- Artist: Igusa Matsuyama
- Composer: Kumi Tanioka
- Series: Harvest Moon
- Platform: Nintendo 3DS
- Release: JP: February 23, 2012; NA: October 19, 2012; EU: September 20, 2013; AU: November 14, 2013
- Genres: Farming simulation, role-playing game
- Mode: Single-player

Harvest Moon 3D: A New Beginning (牧場物語はじまりの大地, Bokujō Monogatari: Hajimari no Daichi; lit. "Ranch Story: Land of the Beginning") is a game for the Nintendo 3DS released by Natsume Inc. It is the last entry in the franchise released on the Nintendo 3DS systems to receive the title of Harvest Moon.

== Gameplay ==
The story involves reviving an abandoned town named Echo Village in order to allow the residents and animals to return.

New features to the Harvest Moon series include extensive character customization, design of the house and furniture of the protagonist, and the ability to customize the appearance of the village the game takes place in.

The multiplayer mode is region-free, and players can bring their cows and furry animals like sheep and alpaca, and can milk or shear each other's animals. Sometimes a giant animal will spawn, which give players five big products. Starting players can get a lot of money from collecting animal products in multiplayer, thus the good reception of the multiplayer feature. Players must bring a gift which will be swapped randomly at the beginning of the session. Players can do multiplayer over local connection or Internet, and with "Anyone" or "Friends".

There are twelve marriage candidates for the player to choose from, six women and six men. Each are unlocked at different points during the game as the town is developed, and three are not unlocked until the end of the game including the Witch Princess, Amir, and Sanjay.

== Plot ==
The player (male is by default named Henry and female is by default named Rachel) arrives in a town called Echo Village, where they meet Dunhill, the town's mayor. He reveals that the town is fallen into disarray and many villagers have moved away as a result. After showing the player their farm, the player attempts to revive the village and construct buildings to motivate the villagers into coming back and convince new people to move in. Aiding the player is the Harvest Goddess and two Harvest Sprites: Aaron and Alice. Once the player is successful, a firework celebration is held to honor their success in restoring Echo Village.

== Development ==
Natsume Inc. announced on May 29, 2012, that Harvest Moon 3D: A New Beginning would be released in North America. The game was released early by Natsume in North America and started shipping on October 19 instead of closer to its original street date, November 6. It was announced on June 5, 2013, that the game would be released in Europe by Marvelous AQL Europe during Q3 of 2013. A New Beginning is the first true 3DS Harvest Moon game, preceded by Harvest Moon: The Tale of Two Towns which was developed for the DS and released alongside a port for the 3DS. A New Beginning introduces features to the series, including the ability to fully customize the player, farm, and the town of setting.

== Release ==
Special edition preorders included a stuffed cow doll, and regular version preorders included a yak doll. The publisher Natsume Inc. announced on October 17, 2012, that the game had gone gold and that there was "unprecedented" interest in the special 15th anniversary edition of the game.

== Reception ==
Reception

Aggregate score
Aggregator	Score
Metacritic	74/100

Review scores
Publication	Score
4Players	60%
Famitsu	32/40
GamesTM	7/10
IGN	8.3/10
Nintendo Life	8/10
Nintendo Power	7/10
Official Nintendo Magazine	80%
Pocket Gamer	3/5
RPGamer	4/5
Metro	7/10

The game received above-average reviews according to the review aggregation website Metacritic. IGN cited the edit features, character customization, extensive tutorials, and a gradual beginning. In Japan, Famitsu gave it a score of 32 out of 40.
