= Harvest Moon (video game) =

1996 video game

- North American cover art
- Developer: Amccus
- Publishers: JP: Pack-In-Video; NA: Natsume Inc.; EU: Nintendo
- Director: Yasuhiro Wada
- Producer: Yasuhiro Wada
- Designers: Setsuko Miyakoshi; Ken Takahashi
- Artist: Kenji Koyama
- Composer: Tsuyoshi Tanaka
- Series: Story of Seasons
- Platform: Super Nintendo Entertainment System
- Release: JP: August 9, 1996; NA: June 17, 1997; EU: January 29, 1998
- Genre: Farm simulation
- Mode: Single-player

Harvest Moon, known in Japan as Bokujō Monogatari (牧場物語, lit. "Farm Story"), is a farm simulation role-playing video game developed by Amccus for the Super Nintendo Entertainment System. The game was first released in Japan by Pack-In-Video in 1996, in North America by Natsume Inc. in 1997, and in Europe by Nintendo in 1998. It is the first game in the long-running Story of Seasons series (formerly known as Harvest Moon in western territories).

Director Yasuhiro Wada conceived Harvest Moon as a leisurely country-living simulation game that contrasted from the competitive fighting games popular at the time. Development took three years, and the game was released late in the Super Nintendo's lifespan, during the release of next-generation 32-bit hardware. Sales were initially low but increased over time, eventually becoming a commercial success. The game is considered one of the first farm life simulation games and cozy games.

== Gameplay ==
The player tills the ground to plant crops

The player controls a young man charged with maintaining the farm he inherits from his grandfather. The primary objective is to restore and maintain a farm that has fallen into disrepair. The player decides how to allocate time between daily tasks, such as clearing land, planting crops, selling harvests, raising livestock, attending festivals, building relationships with villagers, and foraging.

For vegetables to develop, they must receive water each day; lack of water does not kill crops, but prevents them from growing. Animals must be fed once a day to keep them producing. Although the only care that chickens require is feeding, cows must be talked to frequently, brushed, and milked to retain their health. A cow may become sick if it is not fed for one day, which may lead to death if ignored. Chickens may die if left outside, where they can be blown away in a storm or eaten by wild dogs. After dark, the only business in town that the player can access is the bar, where a number of non-player characters gather to drink and talk.

== Development ==
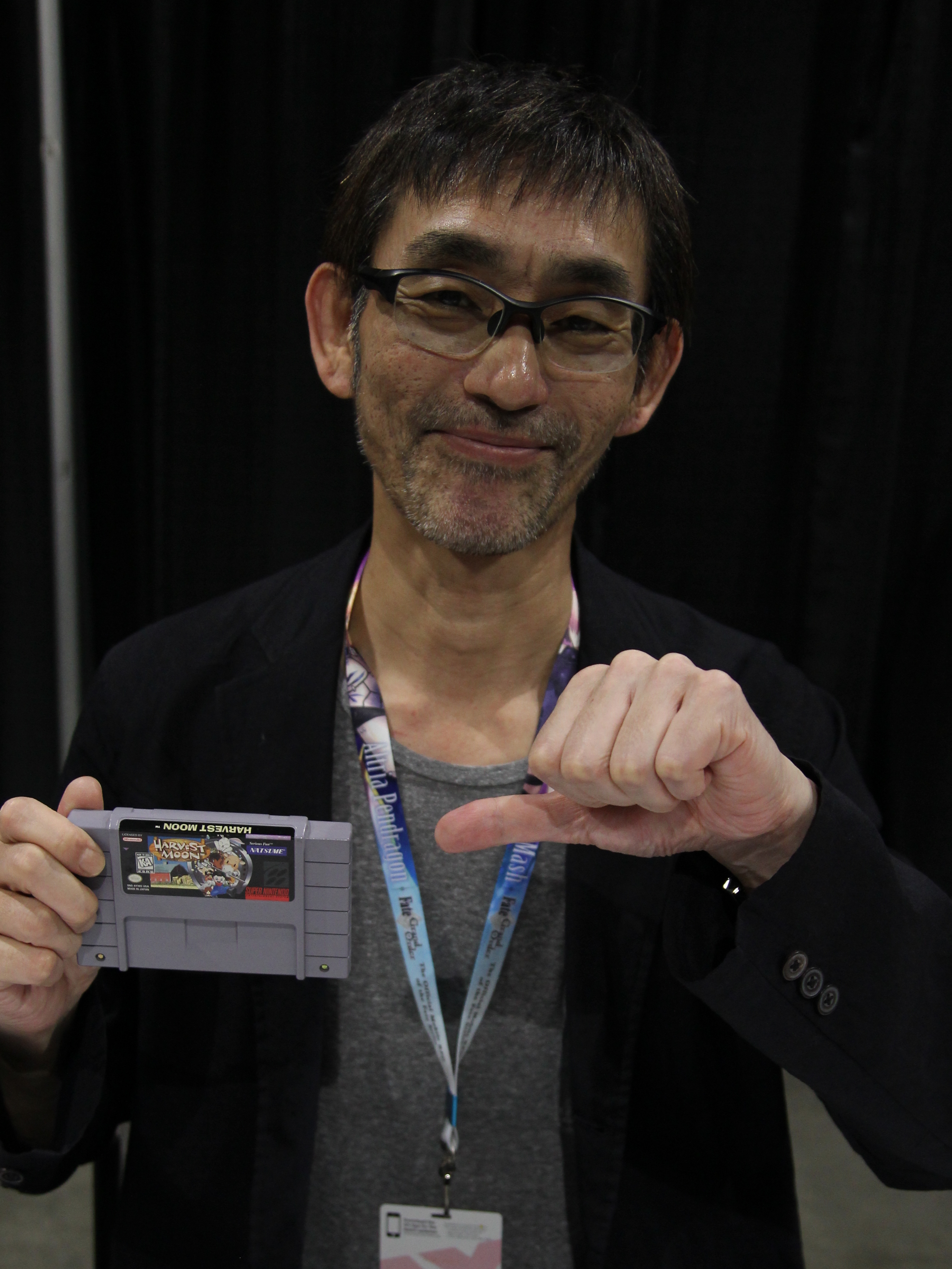
Director Yasuhiro Wada in 2018, holding a copy of Harvest Moon

The concept of Harvest Moon came to director Yasuhiro Wada during his first years living in Tokyo. His first job was as a production assistant on PC Engine games, where he learned more about the principles of game development. New to life in the big city, Wada would reminisce about his simple childhood life in the countryside in Miyazaki, Kyushu. He conceived an idea for a country-living simulation game, including the ability to get married and have children. He wanted the game to be unique apart from the fighting games popular at the time, but was worried it would not be successful as there was no comparable precedent. It took Wada two years to build the budget and rapport to propose Harvest Moon. Among the games he worked on during this time was Magical Pop'n. Harvest Moon was the first original title he would work on.

The first draft for the game was completed in 1993. Wada wanted a world reminiscent of dairy farms in Alpine Europe but with fantasy and machinery elements. He took some inspiration from the manga Dr. Slump for the setting. In order to make a work simulation game enjoyable, Wada initially looked at Derby Stallion, a series of horse breeding and racing games. However, the amount of digits on screen would be reduced to help with immersion, with the player being able to determine progress using visual cues in the environment. The team began development with three principles: no fighting, unique, and tactile real-time action.

Harvest Moon was developed over three years by between eight-to-ten people at Pack-In Soft. In early builds of the game, the core gameplay surrounded herding cows and interacting with villagers. Wada soon learned that his ideas on paper did not translate well to gameplay; raising the cows was overly complex and not as fun as the developers hoped, and villager interactions were dull as well. In the following builds, cow raising was simplified to make it more enjoyable, and other tasks for the player were added, including clearing land and planting crops—concepts influenced by the Wada's experiences modifying the environment in The Legend of Zelda (1986). Also, the concept of seeking out and marrying a wife in the game was added as a core social goal for the player. The team had to scale back or cut some ideas when encountering technical limitations of the SNES. Wada realized through development that combat in games added depth and challenge, and making a game fun without combat was proving to be more difficult than he anticipated.

As development was progressing to later stages, their parent company went bankrupt, so most of the development staff disbanded. During the final six month of development, only three people worked on the game, making finishing touches: Wada as director, programmer Tomomi Yamatate, and game designer Setsuko Miyakoshi.

== Release ==
Harvest Moon was released on August 9, 1996, in Japan for the Super Famicom. It was released after the launch of the PlayStation and Nintendo 64. Initially, only 20,000 copies were sold, but after good reviews were published and word-of-mouth spread, the game went on to sell over 100,000 copies in Japan. In a retrospective analysis, Edge was impressed at the game's success despite releasing so closely to next generation hardware. Wada originally never thought the game would be localized, but it was localized for North America and Europe. It was released in North America on August 17, 1997, and in Europe on January 29, 1998. According to Natsume Inc.'s Adam Fitch, the game sold "a decent amount for that time". The European version shipped with language localizations for Germany and France.

When localized, all alcohol references were replaced with "juice", even though anyone who drinks said "juice" clearly becomes intoxicated. While many elements of the game were Westernized for its American release, some Japanese cultural elements remained. For example, townspeople sometimes discuss the church and its religion in Shinto terms, such as referring to the existence of both a "God of the Harvest" and a "God of Business". In the "New Day" cinematic sequences, the character eats an onigiri, a traditional Japanese food item. The news anchor on TV in the game bows to the audience in a welcoming manner, which is uncommon in Western countries.

The game has been re-released on the Nintendo 3DS, Wii, Wii U and Nintendo Switch.

=== Satellaview version ===
BS Bokujō Monogatari (BS 牧場物語) was a four-episode ura- or gaiden-version of the original Harvest Moon, released on the Satellaview. Each episode was available for download via satellite broadcast during September 2–23, 1996, from 6:00 to 6:50PM. It featured "SoundLink" narration (radio drama-style streaming voice data to guide players). Due to the nature of SoundLink broadcasts, these games were only playable during the broadcast windows. The game was never released outside Japan or released as a stand-alone game. A single rerun of the broadcasts was conducted in the same weekly format November 4–30, 1996, at 5:00 to 5:50PM. The episodes were:

- First Time "Outdoor Life" (はじめての「あうとどあＬＩＦＥ」, Hajimete no "Autodoa Life") released on September 2, 1996
- Fruitful Land and Mind! (大地と心に溢れる実り！, Daichi to Kokoro ni Afureru Minori!) released on September 9, 1996
- We Are All Alive (僕らはみんな生きている, Bokura wa Minna Ikite iru) released on September 16, 1996
- Aim for Ranch Master! (牧場マスターを目指せ！, Bokujō Masutā o Mezase!) released on September 23, 1996

== Reception ==
Reception

Aggregate score
Aggregator	Score
GameRankings	73%

Review scores
Publication	Score
Electronic Gaming Monthly	8.5/10, 8/10, 8/10, 8/10
Famitsu	7/10, 9/10, 9/10, 9/10
Total!	2+
Super Play	89/100

The game received mainly positive reviews and has a GameRankings standing of 73%. Crispin Boyer remarked in Electronic Gaming Monthly, "An RPG about farming? Talk about a hard sell. But this epic adventure in agriculture is as fun as it is original." He and the other three members of the EGM review team praised the game's original concept and the numerous interesting tasks the player must juggle. The four reviewers in Famitsu complimented the game saying that even during the more monotonous days of work, the real-time gameplay added tension to the proceedings. One reviewer said that the game "really struck a chord with me. I've never come across a game that expresses the excitement of "what will I do tomorrow?""

For the release of Harvest Moon on the Wii's Virtual Console, IGN rated the game at 8.5, praising the game's still gorgeous 16-bit graphics and addictive gameplay. In 2018, Complex ranked the Harvest Moon 72nd on their "The Best Super Nintendo Games of All Time". IGN rated the game 46th in its "Top 100 SNES Games." They praised the game being incredibly fun.

== Legacy ==
The profitable release of Harvest Moon led to development of a second game in what would become a series, Harvest Moon GB. A third installment, Harvest Moon 64, would also be developed. For nearly the next two decades, new Harvest Moon games would be released frequently, at which point new games would be released under the title Story of Seasons due to issues with rights when Marvelous chose to move their localization division from Natsume Inc. to Xseed Games.

Harvest Moon is one of the first games of the farm life simulation genre, also considered by some to be the first cozy game. Engadget called Harvest Moon "one of the most quietly influential games in the industry". According to Edge, millions of gamers have played farming simulation games of some kind since Harvest Moon's release.
