= Harvest Moon DS: Island of Happiness =

2007 video game

- Developer: Marvelous Interactive
- Publishers: JP: Marvelous Interactive; NA: Natsume Inc.; EU: Rising Star Games
- Producer: Hikaru Nakano
- Artist: Igusa Matsuyama
- Composers: Noriko Ishida; Eri Yasuda; Yousuke Agou
- Series: Story of Seasons
- Platform: Nintendo DS
- Release: JP: February 1, 2007; NA: August 26, 2008; EU: December 12, 2008; AU: March 26, 2009
- Genre: Simulation
- Mode: Single player

Harvest Moon DS: Island of Happiness, known simply as Harvest Moon: Island of Happiness, and known in Japan as Bokujō Monogatari: Kimi to Sodatsu Shima (牧場物語 キミと育つ島; lit. "Farm Story: The Island Grows With You"), is a farm simulation video game published and developed by Marvelous Interactive Inc. in Japan and released in North America by Natsume Inc. exclusively for the Nintendo DS. It is the third installment of the Story of Seasons series on the DS. It is the first entry without series creator Yasuhiro Wada involved.

Harvest Moon DS: Island of Happiness is the second time that the series has branched a protagonist in an ongoing story, as the game no longer takes place in the previous continuity. Alongside its sequel, Harvest Moon DS: Sunshine Islands, they both follow the new protagonists Mark and Chelsea. Prior entries were all interconnected to a central story of descendants that all carried over the family farm.

== Gameplay ==
=== Animals ===
Livestock includes cows, chickens, and sheep, which produce milk, eggs, and wool respectively. Work animals include a dog and horse, which can be acquired after meeting certain criteria. The dog protects livestock, and the horse can be ridden and used for farm work.

=== Marriage ===
As in other games in the Harvest Moon series, Island of Happiness offers players a chance to marry. Marriage is only possible once you have met everyone in the game. If the player chooses the male protagonist, there are six bachelorettes to choose from: Natalie, Witch Princess, Julia, Lanna, Sabrina, and Chelsea. Playing as a female protagonist, the player can choose from six eligible bachelors: Vaughn, Denny, Shea, Pierre, Elliot, and Mark. You can also have a child after getting married. Said child progresses only so far as to begin to crawl, toddle, and speak and never reaches adulthood.

== Story ==
In the beginning, the player, either as the male character Mark or the female character Chelsea (the character not chosen by the player will later on appear as an NPC), is shipwrecked with a family of four and ends up on a deserted island. There seem to be signs of past life on the island as it used to be a bustling place, but all its villagers had moved away from the island. By doing various tasks such as growing crops, raising livestock, fishing, cooking, or mining, the player will attract new villagers (much like Harvest Moon: Magical Melody). These provide ranching or agricultural services. Some are characters visiting from Mineral Town. The game's credits roll when the player marries one of the bachelors or bachelorettes.

== Development ==
The American pre-order bonus was a limited edition plush chicken that was included with the game when ordered from participating retailers.

== Reception ==
Reception

Aggregate score
Aggregator	Score
Metacritic	65/100

Review scores
Publication	Score
1Up.com	B
Famitsu	28/40
Game Informer	6.75/10
GameSpot	5/10
GameZone	5.5/10
IGN	5.8/10
Nintendo Power	7/10
PALGN	5.5/10
Pocket Gamer	3.5/5
RPGamer	1.5/5

The game received "mixed" reviews according to the review aggregation website Metacritic. In Japan, Famitsu gave it all four sevens for a total of 28 out of 40.

In Australia, Tracey Lien of Hyper commended the game for bringing "back the addictive elements from previous games." However, she criticized the "clumsy control system that makes even the most basic of tasks feel like a chore."
