= Harvest Moon: My Little Shop =

2009 video game

- Developer: h.a.n.d.
- Publishers: JP: Marvelous Interactive; NA: Natsume Inc.
- Director: Masatoshi Hashiya
- Producers: Yoshifumi Hashimoto; Yasuhiro Wada
- Artist: Igusa Matsuyama
- Composers: Kenji Hiwatari; Yuki Watanabe; Daisuke Saito
- Series: Story of Seasons
- Platform: WiiWare
- Release: JP: April 28, 2009; NA: November 23, 2009
- Genre: Simulation
- Mode: Single-player

Harvest Moon: My Little Shop (牧場物語シリーズ まきばのおみせ, Bokujō Monogatari Series: Makiba no o-Mise) is a video game developed by h.a.n.d. Inc. It was released for the Wii via Nintendo's WiiWare service.

== Gameplay ==
In a variation on the usual Harvest Moon focus on farming and animal husbandry, this title revolved around running a shop. Players can choose either a female or male avatar who then creates a series of shops with different designs and utilizes the Wiimote for a series of minigames. The game also incorporates social aspects such as taking snap shots of the shops and posting them on the Wii message board.

== Story ==
The protagonist (male is by default named Cory and female is by default named Connie) return home and learn that their parents are on a research trip and won't be home for the time being. They are sent to live with their grandparents in Clover Town. The town is rundown, with businesses and people leaving en masse; the player is tasked with the town's, and the town's Harvest Sprites', revival. They also decide to run the farm on their own and their grandparents agreed. The player also discovers the Happy Tower, a large tower that is home to the Harvest Sprites and has four windmills that will only turn for the Winds of Joy, which is triggered by reviving the Harvest Sprites. Characters from previous Harvest Moon games also make an appearance. Once all Harvest Sprites are revived and the windmills are turning again, the player is given seeds that, after being planted, grow into four-leaf clovers, which is formed into a necklace that can be used to give to a character that they have befriended the most. The game's main story ends after this point.

== Development ==
The game was previewed at E3 2009. Four sets of add-on content were made available for the game; a Juice Bar Set, an Egg Stand Set, and Ice Cream Set, and a New Friends set between November 2009 and January 2010.
