= Harvest Moon DS: Grand Bazaar =

2008 video game

- North American box art
- Developer: Marvelous Interactive
- Publishers: JP: Marvelous Interactive; NA: Natsume Inc.; EU: Rising Star Games
- Director: Takahiro Yura
- Producer: Yoshifumi Hashimoto
- Artist: Igusa Matsuyama
- Composers: Noriko Ishida; Eri Yasuda; Ayumu Murai; Shingo Kataoka
- Series: Story of Seasons
- Platforms: Nintendo DS; Windows; Nintendo Switch; Nintendo Switch 2; PlayStation 5; Xbox Series X/S
- Release: JP: December 18, 2008; NA: August 24, 2010; EU: September 30, 2011
- Genres: Simulation, role-playing
- Modes: Single-player, multiplayer

Harvest Moon DS: Grand Bazaar, known in Japan as Bokujō Monogatari: Yōkoso! Kaze no Bazaar e (牧場物語 ようこそ！風のバザールへ, Bokujō Monogatari: Yōkoso! Kaze no Bazāru e; Ranch Story: Welcome! to Wind's Bazaar), is a simulation role-playing video game released on December 18, 2008 by Marvelous Interactive in Japan, and released on August 24, 2010 by Natsume Inc. in North America. It was released in Europe on September 30, 2011 by Rising Star Games. The game is the nineteenth game in the Story of Seasons series and the fifth game in the series for the Nintendo DS.

On March 27, 2025, a remake of the game under the title of Story of Seasons: Grand Bazaar was announced via a Nintendo Direct presentation and released on the Nintendo Switch, Nintendo Switch 2, and Microsoft Windows on August 27, 2025. The remake was released for PlayStation 5 and Xbox Series X/S on May 28, 2026.

== Plot ==
Zephyr Town's bazaar was once the most famous in the world, featuring customers and peddlers from all over the world. However, the bazaar has fallen into despair after some tragic events. The player (male is by default named Hansel and female is by default named Gretel) is tasked to bring prosperity back to Zephyr Town by setting their bazaar and expand it. Once this goal is reached, the town receives a large crowd of customers and the story ends.

== Reception ==
Reception

Aggregate score
| Aggregator | Score |
|---|---|
| Metacritic | 68/100 |

Review scores
| Publication | Score |
|---|---|
| Eurogamer | 6/10 |
| Famitsu | 30/40 |
| GameZone | 7.5/10 |
| IGN | 6.5/10 |
| Nintendo Life | 8/10 |
| Nintendo Power | 6/10 |
| Official Nintendo Magazine | 81% |
| Pocket Gamer | 4/5 |
| RPGamer | 2/5 |
| RPGFan | 77% |
| Metro | 6/10 |

The game received "average" reviews according to the review aggregation website Metacritic. In Japan, Famitsu gave it a score of two sevens and two eights for a total of 30 out of 40.
