= Harvest Moon: Frantic Farming =

2009 video game

- Developers: Platinum-Egg Inc. Namco Networks (BlackBerry)
- Publishers: NA: Natsume Inc.; EU: Rising Star Games; Namco Networks (BlackBerry)
- Directors: Takashi Miyasaka; Masato Takano
- Producers: Yoshifumi Hashimoto; Hikaru Nakano; Yoji Yano
- Artist: Igusa Matsuyama
- Composer: Yukio Nakajima
- Series: Harvest Moon
- Platforms: BlackBerry, Nintendo DS, iOS, Android
- Release: iOS: NA: August 7, 2009; Nintendo DS: NA: August 25, 2009; EU: December 3, 2010; AU: December 23, 2010; BlackBerry: NA: March 31, 2010
- Genre: Puzzle

Harvest Moon: Frantic Farming is a farming puzzle video game developed by Platinum-Egg Inc. It was released for Nintendo DS and iOS on August 25, 2009. At E3 2011, Natsume announced the game would be ported to Android in Summer 2011. The game features twelve playable characters along with Download Play Multi-Player for the Nintendo DS version.

== Plot ==
The players compete to gather vegetables to fix a mysterious glowing tower that is causing vegetables to sprout at random all over Sunny Island. The story is told through the point of views of twelve characters: Mark, Chelsea, Vaughn, Pierre, Sabrina, Elliot, Natalie, Shea, Lanna, Julia, Denny, and Witch Princess. In the end, all the crops disappear; Witch Princess's story reveals that she had touched a stone slab that controls the tower, which in turn deactivates it. In the end, a festival is held as a celebration.

== Reception ==
Reception

Aggregate score
Aggregator	Score
Metacritic	DS: 72/100

Review scores
Publication	Score
GamePro	3.5 of 5
GameZone	8 of 10
Nintendo Power	8 of 10
Nintendo World Report	9 of 10
Official Nintendo Magazine	75%

Harvest Moon: Frantic Farming received mainly positive critical reception upon release. Lauren Ronaghan of Nintendo World Report praised the game's puzzle elements, calling the game "immense fun", and while GamePro's Aaron Kohn agreed on the strong puzzle gameplay, he noted the game's unequal distribution in difficulty. Nintendo Power and Official Nintendo Magazine gave the game an 8 out of 10 and 75% respectively. GameZone's Derek Buck concluded that although Harvest Moon: Frantic Farming does not offer much in innovation, the gameplay is where it excels.
