= Harvest Moon: Back to Nature =

1999 video game

- PlayStation version cover art
- Developer: Victor Interactive Software
- Publishers: JP: Victor Interactive Software; NA/EU: Natsume
- Directors: Masayuki Kisaki; Teru Kurouta; Rouge Kaizuki; Magoichi Oritake
- Producer: Yasuhiro Wada
- Artist: Igusa Matsuyama
- Composer: Miyuki Homareda
- Series: Story of Seasons
- Platforms: PlayStation, PlayStation Portable
- Release: December 16, 1999: PlayStation; JP: December 16, 1999; NA: November 22, 2000; EU: January 26, 2001 PlayStation Portable; JP: November 23, 2005; NA: July 31, 2007
- Genres: Life simulation, Role-playing
- Mode: Single-player

Harvest Moon: Back to Nature is a 1999 video game in the farm simulation series Story of Seasons developed by Victor Interactive Software and published outside of Japan by Natsume. It is the first Harvest Moon game for a non-Nintendo console. Characters from Harvest Moon 64 were transferred to be the characters in this game, although with new lifestyles, personalities, and relatives.

A version featuring a female protagonist, Harvest Moon for Girl, was released in Japan on December 7, 2000. In 2005, Harvest Moon: Back to Nature was coupled and ported as Harvest Moon: Boy & Girl for the PlayStation Portable. In 2008, Marvelous Interactive released Harvest Moon: Back to Nature and Harvest Moon for Girl for the PlayStation 3 and PlayStation Portable via the PlayStation Network.

This game was remade as the Game Boy Advance games Harvest Moon: Friends of Mineral Town and Harvest Moon: More Friends of Mineral Town, both of which would later get a remake of their own for the Nintendo Switch under the name Story of Seasons: Friends of Mineral Town.

== Story ==
As a young boy, the main character, named Pete by default, went to his grandfather's farm for the summer. His grandfather was too busy taking care of the farm to spend much time with him, so the boy explored the town and countryside on his own. The boy befriended his grandfather's puppy and met a little girl his own age with whom he became close friends. When the summer was over the boy had to go back home, but he promised the little girl that he would return someday. Ten years later, years after his grandfather's death, the boy, now a grown man, returns to the town to take over the farm. Upon meeting the main character, mayor and other villagers decide that he would be allowed to stay as the rightful owner if he restored the farm to its original state within three years. Otherwise, he would have to leave. If he is successful and has married one of the bachelorettes, he will be allowed to stay and his wife reveals that she is the young girl from his childhood.

The girl part of the story began at a ship, where the female character, named Claire by default, befriended a fellow passenger, but tragedy struck. The passenger ship she was in sunk, she was the sole survivor, and washed ashore at the village where she was found by a boy. She was revived by the villagers and she was given the abandoned farm to start her life over, after the villagers learn of her situation. The story ends if she marries a bachelor, who is revealed to be the same boy who found her.

== Gameplay ==
The game begins with main character inheriting a small amount of money and ramshackle farm covered in weeds. Over the course of the game the player must build a thriving farm, and become a friend of the citizens of Mineral Town. Throughout the game the player must balance between attending to the farm and interacting with other characters to maintain friendships. In order to begin with the story, the player must overcome the first obstacle of reestablishing the farm by getting rid of weeds and planting new crops. Once that is done a time frame of three years to completely rejuvenate the farm begins. Time passes while the player is outdoors, and pauses inside different buildings such as shops or barns and mines. Both the growing of crops and raising of livestock require daily attention and the expenditure of time.

Player starts off with an assortment of rudimentary farming tools which can later be upgraded and refined to allow for a more efficient work rate, allowing more work to be done with less energy. Energy is the predominant element of the game, affecting all other aspects of it, particularly in the early stages. The main character can perform a limited amount of tasks each day. Rather than displaying an energy bar, the game instead shows the character becoming more tired as he performs more tasks. Working after the energy has been depleted results in character's blackout and hospitalization which leads to incapacity to perform work; duration of hospitalization increases with each subsequent blackout. There are weather patterns as well as four different seasons in the game, often changing at random but also when certain progress is made. There are rainfalls, hurricanes, frost and blizzards which all do damage to player's farm as they would in real life.

Player can participate in a number of activities, such as betting on horse races, dating and partaking in festivals which coincide with the seasons. During the game, the player will be tasked with finding a suitable wife who will, once proposed to, join the player on the farm where they soon after marry and start a family.
Once the initial three years pass, if the farm was completely renewed, the player character's family settles on their farm for good and the game continues indefinitely, otherwise the game ends.

== Reception ==
Reception

Aggregate score
Aggregator	Score	
Aggregator	PS	PSP
Metacritic	82/100	61/100

Review scores
Publication	Score	
Publication	PS	PSP
AllGame	3.5/5	N/A
Electronic Gaming Monthly	7/10	N/A
EP Daily	8/10	N/A
Famitsu	31/40	N/A
Game Informer	6.75/10	N/A
GamePro	4/5	N/A
GameSpot	8.3/10	5/10
GameZone	N/A	7/10
IGN	7.5/10	7.1/10
Official U.S. PlayStation Magazine	3.5/5	N/A
PlayStation: The Official Magazine	7/10	6/10

Back to Nature received "favorable" reviews, while Boy & Girl received "mixed" reviews, according to the review aggregation website Metacritic. In Japan, Famitsu gave the former a score of 31 out of 40.

In Indonesia, Back to the Nature was localized into Indonesian by Palapa, one of the earliest games to be localized into Indonesian market, leading to the series's enduring popularity in the country.
