= Story of Seasons (video game) =

2014 video game

- Developer: Marvelous AQL
- Publishers: JP: Marvelous AQL; NA: Xseed Games; EU: Nintendo
- Director: Takahiro Yura
- Producer: Yoshifumi Hashimoto
- Artist: Igusa Matsuyama
- Composers: Riyo Kinugasa; Noriko Ishida
- Series: Story of Seasons
- Platform: Nintendo 3DS
- Release: JP: February 27, 2014; NA: March 31, 2015; EU: December 31, 2015; AU: January 9, 2016
- Genre: Farm life sim
- Mode: Single-player

Story of Seasons, known in Japan as Bokujō Monogatari: Tsunagaru Shin Tenchi (牧場物語 つながる新天地, lit. Farm Story: Linking the New World), is a farming simulation video game developed by Marvelous Entertainment for the Nintendo 3DS. It was released in Japan on February 27, 2014, and in North America on March 31, 2015. This was the first game not under the Harvest Moon franchise title in North America due to Natsume Inc.'s ownership of the name.

The game follows along the same lines as the rest of the series, in which the player takes on the role of a farmer. The player can choose to play as a male or female farmer and between two difficulties at the beginning of the game. The difficulty level cannot be changed once chosen. There are a variety of things to do in the game such as producing crops and raising livestock. The game also introduces new characters, including a tiny goddess and a tiny witch.

== Story ==
The player, Johnny (male) or Annie (female), is bored with their regular life and receives a flyer announcing the recruitment of farmers in Oak Tree Town. Wanting to risk it all, they move to the small village to meet Veronica, the village's mayor. There are four other farmers living in Oak Tree Town: Eda, Fritz, Giorgio, and Elise, who will teach the player how to run their new farm. They must unlock all seven vendors by fulfilling certain requirements and make Oak Tree Town a renowned international trade city. Large variety of seeds, items, buildings, and animals become available through unlocking the vendors. Together, the NPC farmers and the player will help each other become successful. The player will also meet five Nature Sprites: Flick, Mora, Gusto, Torque, and Pepita, a young witch named Witchie, and a young Harvest Goddess named Dessie. At one point, Eda dies from an illness and her farm is passed to the player. In the end, once all traders have come to town, a meeting is held to thank the player for their efforts in making the town into a popular trade city.

== Gameplay ==
The main feature of the game is connectivity according to Yoshifumi Hashimoto, the producer of the Story of Seasons series. Players sell their crop and dairy products to other countries in the game via a Trade Station. Some countries prefer one type of item over another, and may have to travel to the other countries to make deliveries. Personal farm data can be swapped with other players using StreetPass.

The player can set up a wildlife Safari, housing a variety of exotic animals such as monkeys and parrots. The Safari will be toured by the other villagers, similar to the Garden Tour in A New Beginning. The exotic animals are added through the Safari through unlocking them from vendors in the game through having good relations with them. The player can only keep other animals by meeting certain conditions. If the player becomes friendly with the animals through interaction they will be able to keep more animals in the Safari. Farm animals that are brought and taken care of within the Safari become happier and less stressed. In the Safari, there is a mine where rare gems and minerals can be found through use of the hammer tool.

== Reception ==
Reception

Aggregate score
Aggregator	Score
Metacritic	76/100

Review scores
Publication	Score
Destructoid	8/10
Famitsu	32/40
Game Informer	7.5/10
GamesTM	7/10
Hardcore Gamer	4/5
IGN	8.4/10
Nintendo Life	7/10
Nintendo World Report	8/10
RPGamer	4/5
RPGFan	80%
The Escapist	4.5/5
Metro	6/10

The game received "generally favorable reviews" according to the review aggregation website Metacritic. IGN said, "Story of Seasons successfully integrates both supply-and-demand economics and personality into the farm life sim." In Japan, Famitsu gave it a score of all four eights for a total of 32 out of 40.

The Escapist gave it four-and-a-half stars out of five, calling it "a refreshing game offering a positive place of escape, and while it is definitely a niche title, it gets everything it does right." National Post gave it a score of eight out of ten, saying that it takes the series "back to its basics." However, Metro gave it six out of ten, saying, "For better and worse this is Harvest Moon in all but name, with a few useful new ideas but still the same old crop of problems."

Story of Seasons was the top selling game in Japan in March 2014, at 131,000 units sold.

In July 2015, Xseed announced that the game became their fastest-selling game ever, with over 100,000 units sold in North America.
