= Harvest Moon 64 =

1999 video game

- Developer: Victor Interactive Software
- Publishers: JP: Pack-In Soft; NA: Natsume Inc.
- Director: Seiichi Kizu
- Producer: Yasuhiro Wada
- Writer: Setsuko Miyakoshi
- Composer: Tsuyoshi Tanaka
- Series: Story of Seasons
- Platform: Nintendo 64
- Release: JP: February 5, 1999; NA: December 21, 1999
- Genre: Farm simulation
- Mode: Single-player

Harvest Moon 64, released in Japan as Bokujō Monogatari 2 (牧場物語2), is a 1999 farm simulation video game developed by Victor Interactive Software for the Nintendo 64 console. It was published by Victor Interactive in Japan and by Natsume Inc. in North America. It is the third game in the Story of Seasons series (following Harvest Moon GB).

The game was re-released on the Wii U in 2017, marking its first release in PAL territories. It was re-released again for the Nintendo Classics service in 2023.

== Gameplay ==
The objective of Harvest Moon 64 is to restore and maintain an abandoned farm left to the player by their grandfather. Along with restoring the farm, there are a number of other side quests that the player may choose to partake in, including training and racing a horse, selling crops, participating in a variety of town festivals, falling in love and getting married, collecting recipes, and collecting photographs from various achievements and events.

The player starts out with the bare minimum features for the farm, including an empty chicken coop and barn, but animals and house extensions can be purchased and tools can be upgraded over the course of the game. The local town, where most of the villagers spend their day, contains a church, a bar, a bakery, a town square, a flower shop, a library, a tool shop, among other things.

Unlike the original Harvest Moon for the SNES, there is a limited amount of time to work in any given day as well as a limited amount of stamina for work. Many game features, such as character locations and which shops are open, vary depending on the current time and day of the week. There are four seasons per year, each with its own weather patterns, crops to grow, and wild herbs available. Some days are reserved for festivals, where every shop is closed and special events take place. This offers a break from daily chores and a chance to interact with the townsfolk in unique ways, such as dancing or swimming.

Planting, growing, and harvesting crops is one of the main focuses of the Story of Seasons series. The crops available to plant include turnips, potatoes, corn, and strawberries, and they can be purchased in the village during their respective season. To plant crops, the player must till the soil, plant the seeds, then water the plots. Several crops will yield multiple vegetables throughout the season if continually watered. When the season ends and a new begins, all crops from the previous season will wither and must be cut down. Alternatively, a greenhouse can be built so that any plant can grow anytime during the year.

Along with crops planted on the farm, there are also wild growing plants and herbs that the player may pick as he goes through his daily chores. The wild growing plants also change from season to season and reappear each day. Though all wild plants are edible, some can cause sickness while others prevent it.

The player starts with five basic tools to help restore the farm: a hammer, an axe, a sickle, a hoe, and a watering can. After a certain amount of usage, a tool will automatically upgrade (signified when the tool becomes silver and then later gold), allowing the player to do more work faster using less energy. Tools for livestock such as a cow milker and an animal brush can be purchased in the village.

The livestock include cows, which may be milked, and sheep, whose wool may be sheared.

Taking care of animals is an essential part of maintaining the farm. Livestock, such as cows, sheep, and chickens, may be purchased at a nearby ranch. These animals require food and care, and if left unfed or left outside in the rain, it will become sick and eventually die unless the player gives it medicine. If the animals are treated well, the products they give will increase in quality.

The player can own a dog and a horse. The dog originally belonged to the player character's grandfather and is a throwback to the original Harvest Moon. A horse can be obtained by visiting the nearby ranch, and can be ridden or used as a portable shipping crate. Both the dog and the horse can compete in yearly races, where their performance is largely determined by their relationship with the player.

One of the other major features of Harvest Moon 64 is the ability to marry and have a child. There are five eligible girls in Harvest Moon 64, represented by hearts that appear in their dialogue boxes, representative of her affection toward the player, ranging from white (indifferent) to pink (in love). Each of these girls has a non-player character suitor that will eventually marry her if the player chooses to marry another girl or chooses not to pursue anyone.

The game features a series of collectable items. When the player reaches a certain milestone or achieves one of several goals, they will receive a photograph in the mail to remember the event. Earned photographs are available for viewing at any time by checking the photo album on the bedside table and are a way to track a player's success in the game.

== Release ==
Harvest Moon 64 was released in Japan on February 5, 1999, and in North America by Natsume Inc. on December 22, 1999.

Natsume initially stated bringing it to Wii U Virtual Console was not possible due to technical issues, despite the Wii proving the task to be possible through homebrew emulation. However, in celebration of the series' twentieth anniversary, the game saw release on the Wii U Virtual Console on February 23, 2017. This also marked the game's debut in the PAL regions (the original had been cancelled due to time constraints), as well as the game's first official re-release (as well as the first time digital) in nearly two decades.

The game was re-released on the Nintendo Classics service on December 7, 2023.

== Reception ==
Reception

Aggregate score
Aggregator	Score
Metacritic	78/100

Review scores
Publication	Score
AllGame	3/5
Electronic Gaming Monthly	7.625/10 (Note: In Electronic Gaming Monthly's review of the game, two critics gave it each a score of 8/10, another gave it 7/10, and one more gave it 7.5/10.)
Famitsu	31/40
Game Informer	7.25/10
GameFan	(L.B.) 92% (G.N.) 91% 89% (Note: In GameFan's viewpoint of the game, three critics gave it each a score of 93, 89, and 85.)
GameSpot	7.3/10
Hyper	83%
IGN	8.2/10
N64 Magazine	(US) 90% (JP) 82%
Nintendo Power	8.2/10
Nintendo World Report	7.5/10

Award
Publication	Award
Parent's Guide to Nintendo Games	Parent's Guide Choice Award

The game received "generally favorable reviews" according to the review aggregation website Metacritic. Nintendo Power gave it a favorable review, nearly two months before it was released Stateside. In Japan, Famitsu gave it a score of 31 out of 40.

Many reviews claimed that although the game had a repetitive soundtrack and often glitchy visual displays, the game's captivating and unique gameplay made up for it.

Aaron Boulding, who rated the game for IGN, said "(he) was able to forgive a lot of shortcomings like poor audio and visual elements because (he) found (himself) playing it for hours at a time." Joe Fielder, who rated it for GameSpot, claimed that "although not for everyone, Harvest Moon 64 is a strangely compelling, original little game that makes hours melt away incomprehensibly." Slo' Mo of GamePro said that the game "isn't a game for swashbucklers or diehard cityslickers [sic], but, for pure RPG fans, it's a horse of a different color." (Note: GamePro gave the game 3.5/5 for graphics, 3/5 for sound, and two 4/5 scores for control and fun factor.)

Mars Publishing's Parent's Guide to Nintendo Games gave the game the only Parent's Guide Choice Award for a Nintendo 64 game because it met the requirements of a game that "displays imagination, creativity, ingenuity of the first order, while offering a playing atmosphere that is educational and enriching."

Nintendo Power ranked Harvest Moon 64 as the 278th greatest Nintendo game of all time.
