= Story of Seasons: Trio of Towns =

2016 video game

- English-language cover art
- Developer: Marvelous
- Publishers: JP: Marvelous; NA: Xseed Games; EU: Nintendo
- Director: Takahiro Yura
- Producer: Yoshifumi Hashimoto
- Artist: Igusa Matsuyama
- Series: Story of Seasons
- Platform: Nintendo 3DS
- Release: JP: June 23, 2016; NA: February 28, 2017; EU: October 13, 2017; AU: October 14, 2017
- Genres: Farm life sim, role-playing
- Mode: Single-player

Story of Seasons: Trio of Towns, known in Japan as Bokujō Monogatari: Mittsu no Sato no Taisetsuna Tomodachi (牧場物語 3つの里の大切な友だち; lit. Ranch Story: Cherished Friends of Three Villages), is a farm life sim role-playing game developed by Marvelous for the Nintendo 3DS. The game was released in June 2016 in Japan, February 2017 in North America, and in October 2017 in Europe and Australia. In this video game, apart from the usual farmland which the player owns, they can visit three towns, each with their own distinct culture and lifestyles.

Like the previous installment, Trio of Towns features a Super Mario collaboration. However, instead of crops, it is in the form of costumes.

== Plot ==
The story begins with a flashback that shows the player, Henry (male) or Holly (female), visiting a farm with their mother Marlene. The flashback ends when Lynn, the player's younger sister, interrupts them from their thoughts. When their father, Daryl, reveals that they are moving to a new home due to his trading business moving as well, the player reveals that they want to be a farmer. A furious Daryl objects, thinking his child is not ready for that, but later agrees to let them follow their dream just so he can be proven right.

The player goes to Westown to live with Daryl's brother, Frank, so they can learn how to be a farmer from him. As soon as the player begins their task, they interact with citizens and visit two other neighboring towns: Tsuyukusa and Lulukoko. Lynn and Marlene also visit the player at some points and with every success in their progress, Daryl gets more and more furious. The player also meets the town's deities: Dessie, a young Harvest Goddess; Witchie, a young witch; and Inari, a half-fox being (whose gender depends on the protagonist's).

During contests, the player faces off against a mysterious competitor named Mr. D, who is later revealed to be Daryl and was testing them all along. Mr. D reveals that he also wished to be a farmer, but was forced to give up his dream when his father got ill and continue his trading business. He finally respects the player's wishes and they go home to celebrate.

== Development ==
On the 20th anniversary of the series, the designers aimed to do something new with the series, leading them to include multiple towns with different styles. The three towns – Westown, Tsukukusa, and Lulukoko – are each based on different real-world regions. Westown is based partly on North America, Tsukukusa on Japan, and Lulukoko on tropical island countries. The designers made a point of not including references to previous entries in the series, as new players would not get anything out of such references. They also aspired to change the visuals to not be too similar to the first Story of Seasons game, as they wanted to give players the feeling that the two are visually distinct.

== Release ==
People who pre-ordered the game received a capybara "pocket plushie", a stuffed doll that stood 3.5” tall.

== Reception ==
Reception

Aggregate score
Aggregator	Score
Metacritic	74/100

Review scores
Publication	Score
4Players	60%
Destructoid	8/10
Famitsu	32/40
GameSpot	7/10
Hardcore Gamer	4/5
IGN	7.7/10
Nintendo Life	8/10
Nintendo World Report	6.5/10
RPGamer	3.5/5
RPGFan	77%

The game received "mixed or average reviews" according to the review aggregation website Metacritic. IGN said that it was a fun farming simulator with a "low-pressure approach and gorgeous 3DS graphics." All four reviewers for Japanese gaming magazine Famitsu gave the game an 8/10, totalling to a combined score of 32/40.
