= Harvest Moon 3 GBC =

2000 video game

- Developer: Victor Interactive Software
- Publishers: JP: Victor Interactive Software; NA: Natsume Inc.
- Series: Story of Seasons
- Platform: Game Boy Color
- Release: JP: September 29, 2000; PAL: November 7, 2001; NA: November 14, 2001
- Genres: Simulation game, role-playing
- Mode: Single-player

Harvest Moon 3 GBC (Japanese: 牧場物語GB3, Hepburn: Bokujō Monogatari GB3) is a farm simulation video game for the Game Boy Color developed and published by Victor Interactive Software, part of the long-running Story of Seasons series of video games. The game was released for the Nintendo 3DS via Virtual Console in North America on December 11, 2014.

== Gameplay ==
The character may be chosen as a boy or a girl. The beginning and ending are different depending on which character the player chooses. The boy is a successful Rancher, living on the farm from Harvest Moon 2 GBC, who is asked by the mayor to help a girl on a nearby island run the farm of her father. The girl's beginning shows her trying to save Harry's farm by taking control of it. She then meets the boy character.

Harvest Moon 3 GBC takes place on an island, which has some mountainous regions, a grassland, a small village, and the farm where a lot of the game takes place. There are no shops to buy things like tools, crops, and animals; every Monday and Thursday a ferry is available to take the character to the mainland, where all of the shops reside. This is unusual for a Harvest Moon game, as most allow players to buy things whenever they desire.

Growing crops and raising livestock are among the prime tasks in Harvest Moon 3 GBC. But, as with many other HM games, the player has the opportunity to marry his/her partner, and even have a baby. There are some differences between playing as the male or female character; the girl starts out with a free cow and a brush, but cannot upgrade tools, when the boy character can. The male also has more stamina than the female. Also when the player marries as the girl, the game ends, but as a boy, the game continues.

The player is given a pet in the beginning of the game, and may choose from a dog, a cat, a pig, or a bird.

Livestock include cows, chickens, and sheep, and the player can have up to eight of each. Cows produce milk, chickens produce eggs, and sheep produce wool. These animals can give birth under the right conditions. The player can also raise up to eight horses. Horses do not produce any goods, but can be ridden, sold, or entered in the horse racing circuit. Horses entered in the races will not be returned, but their placement can be checked by reading the "Cherry Cup Report" and the "Gallop Stakes Report", found in the bookshelf.

There are a variety of tools, some familiar from previous Harvest Moon games, some new.

== Reception ==
Reception

Review score
Publication	Score
IGN	70

IGN rated the game at 7.0, or "decent", saying that the game has colorful graphics and deep gameplay, though the use of sound effects was not the best.
