= Harvest Moon: Animal Parade =

2008 video game

- Developer: Marvelous Entertainment
- Publishers: JP: Marvelous Entertainment; NA: Natsume Inc.; PAL: Rising Star Games
- Director: Akira Koyama
- Producer: Yasuhiro Wada
- Designers: Akira Koyama; Kenichiro Noboroi; Masahiro Endo; Kazuhiro Tanaka
- Composers: Yasufumi Fukuda; Hideaki Miyamoto
- Series: Story of Seasons
- Platform: Wii
- Release: JP: October 30, 2008; NA: November 12, 2009; EU: December 3, 2010; AU: December 23, 2010
- Genre: Farm life sim
- Modes: Single-player, multiplayer

Harvest Moon: Animal Parade, known in Japan as Farm Story: Exciting Animal March, (Note: Japanese: 牧場物語わくわくアニマルマーチ, Hepburn: Bokujō Monogatari: Waku Waku Animaru Māchi) is a 2008 farm life simulation game developed by Marvelous Entertainment for the Wii. It is the second title for the Wii in the Story of Seasons series, and has the same characters as Harvest Moon: Tree of Tranquility. It features many animals, all of which the player can ride, including circus animals.

Harvest Moon: Animal Parade is also the last entry in the series to be produced by series creator Yasuhiro Wada.

== Story ==
The player (male is by default named Kevin or Kasey and female is by default named Molly or Angela) begins on the island of Castanet and discovers that a divine tree which once stood in the middle of the Harvest Goddess' pond has begun to weaken, the creatures are beginning to leave the island, and the five bells have lost their power. Only the strength of the Harvest King can revive the earth and bring the tree back to life, but he is nowhere to be found. Aided by a Harvest Sprite named Finn, the player must help the other Harvest Sprites ring the five bells to restore the elements to the island, bring the Harvest King back to the island, and have him help revive the Goddess' Tree, while at the same time running a large farm, marrying and having a family, and befriending and helping townsfolk (the same characters from Tree of Tranquility, along with a few new characters). The player must grow and sell their crops to make money to buy things and furnish their ranch house. There are many crops to grow, including beans, tomatoes, potatoes, and many more.

== Reception ==
Reception

Aggregate score
Aggregator	Score
Metacritic	76/100

Review scores
Publication	Score
1Up.com	B
4Players	50%
Famitsu	29/40
GamesMaster	75%
IGN	7.5/10
Jeuxvideo.com	14/20
NGamer	80%
Nintendo Power	7.5/10
Official Nintendo Magazine	80%
RPGFan	85%

The game received "generally favorable reviews" according to the review aggregation website Metacritic. In Japan, Famitsu gave it a score of one seven, one eight, and two sevens for a total of 29 out of 40.
