= Story of Seasons =

- Genres: Social sim Farming sim
- Developers: Amccus (1996); Victor Interactive Software (1997–2001); Marvelous (2003–present)
- Publishers: JP: Marvelous; NA: Marvelous USA (formerly Natsume Inc. and Xseed Games); PAL: Marvelous Europe (formerly Nintendo and Rising Star Games)
- Creator: Yasuhiro Wada
- Platforms: Android; BlackBerry; iOS; Game Boy; Game Boy Advance; Game Boy Color; Nintendo 3DS; Nintendo 64; Nintendo DS; GameCube; Nintendo Switch; Nintendo Switch 2; Wii; Windows; PlayStation; PlayStation 2; PlayStation 3; PlayStation 4; PlayStation 5; PlayStation Portable; Xbox One; Xbox Series X/S; Super Nintendo Entertainment System
- First release: Harvest Moon; 9 August 1996
- Latest release: Story of Seasons: Grand Bazaar; 27 August 2025
- Spin-offs: Rune Factory; Innocent Life; Hometown Story; Return to PopoloCrois

Story of Seasons, known in Japan as Bokujō Monogatari (Japanese: 牧場物語; lit. "Farm Story") and originally known in English as Harvest Moon, is an agricultural farming life simulation video game series created by Japanese video game designer Yasuhiro Wada and developed by Victor Interactive Software (acquired by Marvelous Entertainment in 2003, now Marvelous Inc.). Story of Seasons was the first game to be released under the new international series title of the same name.

From 1996 to 2013, Natsume Inc. oversaw the English translation and distribution of the Bokujo Monogatari series in North America, where the games were released under the series title Harvest Moon. In 2014, however, Marvelous Inc. announced that the latest installment in the series would be localized by their American publishing brand Xseed Games under the new series title Story of Seasons. In 2015, Nintendo published the first game under this title in Europe, Story of Seasons.

The main objective of the series is to rebuild a dilapidated old farm and turn it into a successful one. Over a period of time, the player tends to crops and livestock, befriends nearby townsfolk, and eventually marries and starts a family. The first game in the series, Harvest Moon, was released for the SNES in 1996.

== Naming ==
In 2012, Marvelous discontinued licensing the series to Natsume Inc. Natsume Inc. took the opportunity to develop their own series of Harvest Moon in North America and Europe beginning with the release of Harvest Moon: The Lost Valley. The resulting spin-off series has caused some degree of confusion among fans and video game news sources. Natsume Inc. published this series under the name Harvest Moon until 2014. At that time, Natsume Inc. maintained the rights to the Harvest Moon series name after Marvelous announced that it would have its subsidiary, Xseed Games, take over North American distribution. Because of this, Xseed began bringing the series to North America under the Story of Seasons title, beginning with the release of the game of the same name.

In September 2015, Nintendo of Europe confirmed that they would be publishing the latest entry of the series in Europe under the Story of Seasons name. Previous games released under the series title Harvest Moon were localized in Europe by Rising Star Games.

== Common elements ==
=== Gameplay ===
The player's character has primarily been male, but some games offer the option to play as a female character. The most common storyline of the series involves the player taking over a farm that no longer has an owner tending to it, growing crops, raising livestock, making friends with the town's people and creating a family while running a successful farm. Each game provides objects to collect or goals to complete, whether it is befriending villagers, collecting musical notes, finding sprites, making rainbows, or ringing bells.

Money is obtained by growing crops, raising livestock, fishing, mining, and foraging. With limited time and limited energy, the player has to find a balance between these in order to accomplish their work for the day.

==== Growing crops ====
Crops are the primary source of income in Story of Seasons. In order for crops to grow the player must first clear the field of weeds, rocks, boulders, branches, and stumps. Then with a clear field, they must take their hoe and till the soil. Next, they choose the seeds that they wish to grow and sow them where the soil is tilled. The player must continue to water the crop daily, but it isn't required on a rainy day, and as time goes on the crop will be ready for harvesting. The player must find optimal planting, watering and harvesting patterns. They also must consider the cost, sell price, number of harvests and growth time of the various produce available before planting. Each season has different crops available for planting, though in most games nothing may be planted in winter, and in Harvest Moon crops could not be planted in fall. In some games, a greenhouse or basement can be used during the winter to grow crops.

Turnips, potatoes, tomatoes and corn are staple crops of the series, introduced in the first game. Since then, other games have introduced new crops, such as cabbage, carrots, onions, strawberries, sweet potatoes, pumpkins, rice, pineapples, cucumbers and more. Grass may also be grown and harvested as animal fodder.

==== Ranching livestock ====
The secondary source of income in the games is purchasing, caring for, and raising livestock. Livestock may produce products which may be sold on a daily basis. Giving animals attention will increase their affection towards the player and may increase the quality of their products. Neglecting the animals' needs may lead to sickness and even death.

The first Harvest Moon only had cows and chickens, which were housed in a barn and chicken coop and fed the same fodder. Milk and eggs could both be sold, as well as the animals themselves. Later titles introduced sheep and a separate feed for chickens, as well as machines that could change milk into cheese, eggs into mayonnaise, and wool into yarn. The more recent games allow the player to also raise ducks, goats, alpacas and differently-colored cows. In Harvest Moon: Tree of Tranquility, silkworms and ostriches were introduced to the series, and the new game also enabled players to befriend wild animals and persuade them to live on their farm.

Animals are also able to reproduce. Eggs can be placed in an incubator to hatch a chick in a few days, while giving a cow or sheep a Miracle Potion will impregnate them. Buying and breeding multiple horses was introduced in Harvest Moon 3 GBC for Game Boy Color and continued in Harvest Moon: Magical Melody, Harvest Moon: Tree of Tranquility and Harvest Moon: Animal Parade.

==== Pets and other animals ====
In many Story of Seasons games, the player is given the opportunity to receive a dog and horse as a pet. A large variety of animals can be kept as pets in the newer titles, from pigs and cats to pandas and turtles. In some games, the pets attend competitions (e.g. horse races and dog races) to win prizes. In Harvest Moon: Back to Nature the player can raise fish.

Pest animals are also found in older Story of Seasons games (for example, Friends of Mineral Town) including wild dogs, and gophers. Wild dogs visit the farm at night and harass any livestock not kept in a barn or fenced area. Gophers in some older titles would consume crops.

==== Gathering materials ====
Many Story of Seasons games require the player to gather materials for home improvement, tool improvement, cooking, or selling. The most common building resource in Story of Seasons is wood; other resources can include stone and golden lumber. The player can gather wood by chopping tree stumps and branches, and use the wood to add buildings or fencing to their farm. Mines are present in many games, and minerals gathered can be used for upgrading tools and crafting gifts. In many games wild plants, such as herbs and flowers, may also be gathered.

==== Festivals ====
Most games in the series feature annual festivals which the player can attend. Some festivals are contests with prizes available, while others are social events, some being equivalent to actual holidays, such as Thanksgiving, New Year's Day, and Christmas Eve. Livestock festivals also take place, where the player can submit their animals to compete against other farms. Animals that win these contests often receive benefits; for example, a cow that wins might gain the ability to produce gold milk.

==== Marriage ====
Most Story of Seasons games offer the ability to marry. Gift giving and interacting with the love interest may increase the love interest's affection, and if their affection is high enough marriage may be proposed. Often, the proposal is made with a Blue Feather. In some games, love interests have rivals, who will marry them if the player does not. One Story of Seasons game, the Japanese version of Harvest Moon DS Cute, had allowed players to marry someone of the same sex (termed the "Best Friends" system). The feature was removed from the North American version over concerns its inclusion would have raised the game's ESRB rating.

In the remake game Story of Seasons: Friends of Mineral Town, players are allowed to marry someone of the same sex. In the Western release, it is treated identically to opposite-sex couples. However, in the Japanese release, it is not referred to as marriage proper and instead brings back the "Best Friends" title.

==== Children ====
In many versions, it is possible to have children. Harvest Moon, Harvest Moon 3, Harvest Moon: Animal Parade, Rune Factory 3, Story of Seasons, and Rune Factory 5 are the only versions where the player can have multiple children. However, in Story of Seasons, unlike the other games, pregnancy is only experienced once, as the player character winds up having twins. Harvest Moon: Animal Parade is the first game in the series that allows the player to have two children of either gender, and Rune Factory 3 allows the player to have three children of either gender. Harvest Moon: A Wonderful Life, Harvest Moon: Another Wonderful Life, Harvest Moon DS and Harvest Moon DS Cute are the only games in the series where the player can experience a child's growth from toddler to full-grown adult. Harvest Moon: Tree of Tranquility expands on this by letting the player restart the game as their child after the completion of an end game event. Harvest Moon: Save the Homeland, Harvest Moon GB, Harvest Moon 2 GBC and Innocent Life: A Futuristic Harvest Moon are the only Story of Seasons titles in which the player cannot marry. Rune Factory 2 is the only Story of Seasons where the player can personify two characters, the father and his son or daughter.

== List of games ==
Timeline of Story of Seasons franchise
| 1996 | Harvest Moon |
| 1996 | BS Bokujō Monogatari |
| 1997 | Harvest Moon GB |
1998
| 1999 | Harvest Moon 64 |
| 1999 | Harvest Moon 2 GBC |
| 1999 | Harvest Moon: Back to Nature |
| 2000 | Bokujō Monogatari Harvest Moon for Girl |
| 2000 | Harvest Moon 3 GBC |
| 2001 | Harvest Moon: Save the Homeland |
2002
| 2003 | Harvest Moon: Friends of Mineral Town |
| 2003 | Harvest Moon: A Wonderful Life |
| 2003 | Harvest Moon: More Friends of Mineral Town |
| 2004 | Harvest Moon: Another Wonderful Life |
| 2004 | Harvest Moon: A Wonderful Life Special Edition |
| 2005 | Harvest Moon: Magical Melody |
| 2005 | Harvest Moon DS |
| 2005 | Harvest Moon: Boy & Girl |
| 2005 | Harvest Moon DS Cute |
| 2006 | Rune Factory: A Fantasy Harvest Moon |
| 2007 | Harvest Moon DS: Island of Happiness |
| 2007 | Harvest Moon: Tree of Tranquility |
| 2007 | Innocent Life: A Futuristic Harvest Moon |
| 2007 | Puzzle de Harvest Moon |
| 2008 | Harvest Moon DS: Sunshine Islands |
| 2008 | Harvest Moon: Animal Parade |
| 2008 | Harvest Moon DS: Grand Bazaar |
| 2008 | Rune Factory 2 |
| 2008 | Rune Factory Frontier |
| 2009 | Harvest Moon: Hero of Leaf Valley |
| 2009 | Harvest Moon: My Little Shop |
| 2009 | Harvest Moon: Frantic Farming |
| 2009 | Rune Factory 3 |
| 2010 | Harvest Moon: The Tale of Two Towns |
| 2010 | Minna de Bokujō Monogatari |
| 2011 | Rune Factory: Tides of Destiny |
| 2012 | Harvest Moon 3D: A New Beginning |
| 2012 | Rune Factory 4 |
| 2013 | Hometown Story |
| 2014 | Story of Seasons |
| 2015 | Return to PopoloCrois: A Story of Seasons Fairytale |
| 2016 | Story of Seasons: Trio of Towns |
2017–2018
| 2019 | Doraemon Story of Seasons |
| 2019 | Story of Seasons: Friends of Mineral Town |
| 2019 | Rune Factory 4 Special |
2020
| 2021 | Story of Seasons: Pioneers of Olive Town |
| 2021 | Rune Factory 5 |
| 2022 | Doraemon Story of Seasons: Friends of the Great Kingdom |
| 2023 | Story of Seasons: A Wonderful Life |
| 2023 | Rune Factory 3 Special |
2024
| 2025 | Story of Seasons: Grand Bazaar |

== Reception ==
Aggregate review scores
| Game | GameRankings | Metacritic |
|---|---|---|
| Harvest Moon (HM) | (SNES) 73% | – |
| Harvest Moon GB | (GB) 76% | – |
| Harvest Moon GBC | (GBC) 72% | – |
| Harvest Moon 64 | (N64) 84% | (N64) 78 |
| Harvest Moon 2 GBC | (GBC) 78% | – |
| HM: Back to Nature | (PS1) 79% | (PS1) 82 |
| Harvest Moon 3 GBC | (GBC) 78% | – |
| HM: Save the Homeland | (PS2) 76% | (PS2) 76 |
| Harvest Moon: Friends of Mineral Town | (GBA) 82% | (GBA) 81 |
| HM: A Wonderful Life | (GC) 80% (PS2) 72% | (GC) 79 |
| Harvest Moon: More Friends of Mineral Town | (GBA) 79% | (GBA) 82 |
| HM: Another Wonderful Life | (GC) 72% (PS2) 72% | (GC) 70 |
| HM: Magical Melody | (GC) 84% (Wii) 65.25% | (GC) 83 (Wii) 69 |
| Harvest Moon DS | (DS) 68% | (DS) 67 |
| HM: Boy & Girl | (PSP) 63% | (PSP) 61 |
| Harvest Moon DS Cute | (DS) 61% | (DS) 66 |
| HM DS: Island of Happiness | (DS) 63% | (DS) 65 |
| HM: Tree of Tranquility | (Wii) 65% | (Wii) 65 |
| HM DS: Sunshine Islands | (DS) 75% | (DS) 77 |
| HM: Animal Parade | (Wii) 79% | (Wii) 76 |
| HM DS: Grand Bazaar | (DS) 70% | (DS) 68 |
| HM: Hero of Leaf Valley | (PSP) 73% | (PSP) 74 |
| HM: The Tale of Two Towns | (DS) 71% (3DS) 68% | (DS) 68 (3DS) 63 |
| HM 3D: A New Beginning | (3DS) 76% | (3DS) 74 |
| Story of Seasons (SoS) | (3DS) 76% | (3DS) 76 |
| SoS: Trio of Towns | (3DS) 76% | (3DS) 76 |
| Doraemon SoS | – | (PC) TBA (Switch) 75 (PS4) 68 |
| Story of Seasons: Friends of Mineral Town | – | (PC) TBA (Switch) 77 |
| SoS: Pioneers of Olive Town | – | (Switch) 71 |
| Doraemon SoS: Friends of the Great Kingdom | – | (PC) TBA (Switch) 75 |
| SoS: A Wonderful Life | – | (PC) 76 (Switch) 72 (PS5) 70 (Xbox) 76 |
| SoS: Grand Bazaar | – | (Switch) 81 (NS2) 83 |

In September 2011, Rising Star Games announced that they had sold more than a million copies of the series in PAL regions. In Japan, the DS games in the series had sold more than 948,000 copies alone by April 2011, with the PSP games selling over 81,000 in the same time period. The Tale of Two Towns reached No. 4 in the Japan Software and Hardware Weekly Chart, shipping 63,610 copies in its first week on sale. In March 2014, Story of Seasons was the top selling game in Japan, at 131,000 units sold, and in July 2015, Xseed Games announced that it had become their fastest-selling game ever, with over 100,000 copies sold in North America.

== Legacy ==
Over the years, Story of Seasons has been called a "pioneer" in its genre.

It has inspired a large number of social network games based around farming, most notably Happy Farm (2008) and FarmVille (2009). Happy Farm is considered one of the most influential games of the 2000s, while in early 2010 FarmVille had a peak audience of 84 million monthly active users. In 2009, Marvelous Entertainment released a version of Harvest Moon, called Let's All Harvest Moon (みんなで牧場物語, Minna de Bokujō Monogatari), for the Japanese social network site Mixi, where it attracted 2.3 million users. Other similar farming social network games released in 2009 and 2010 include Sunshine Farm, Happy Farmer, Happy Fishpond, Happy Pig Farm, Farm Town, Country Story, Barn Buddy, Sunshine Ranch, and Happy Harvest, as well as parodies such as Farm Villain.

The developer of Stardew Valley, Eric Barone, has mentioned several times he was inspired by Story of Seasons when developing his game. Given the recent growing popularity of the farming and life simulation genres, most notably in the indie game scene, both Story of Seasons and Stardew Valley, along with the Animal Crossing series, have been regarded as the foundation of this "new golden era" for the genre.
