= Harvest Moon DS: Sunshine Islands =

2008 video game

- North American box art
- Developer: Marvelous Interactive
- Publishers: JP: Marvelous Interactive; NA: Natsume Inc.; EU: Rising Star Games
- Series: Story of Seasons
- Platform: Nintendo DS
- Release: JP: February 21, 2008; NA: November 10, 2009; EU: December 3, 2010; AU: December 23, 2010
- Genre: Farm life simulation
- Mode: Single-player

Harvest Moon DS: Sunshine Islands (Note: Known in Japan as Farm Story: Shining Sun and Friends Japanese: 牧場物語 キラキラ太陽となかまたち, Hepburn: Bokujō Monogatari: Kira Kira Taiyō to Nakama Tachi) is a 2008 farm life simulation game developed by Marvelous for the Nintendo DS. The seventeenth installment of the Story of Seasons series, and the fourth for the DS, the game closely resembles Harvest Moon DS: Island of Happiness; a section of the island from Harvest Moon: Island of Happiness is one of multiple islands in this game. The player can choose to be a boy (Mark) or a girl (Chelsea).

== Plot ==
Many years before the events of the game, a powerful earthquake struck the Sunshine Islands, causing them to sink into the ocean. After the player moves to the island, they are tasked by the harvest sprites and harvest goddess to find the magical Sun Stones and restore the Sunshine Islands to their former glory. Once that is done, a celebration is held for the player for saving the islands.

== Gameplay ==
Gameplay is split into four 30-day seasons to make up a year. Each day takes place over approximately fifteen minutes.

Unlike its predecessor, Harvest Moon DS: Island of Happiness, the player is not limited to controlling the game with the touch screen. Speaking to other characters within the game is either activated by tapping the character or pressing in the A button while facing them. The B button can be held while directing your character to bring him or her to a run. Although the player can now use the buttons, the old touchscreen control system is still intact.

== Marriage ==
Like in other Harvest Moon games, the player is able to marry. The candidates are the same as in Harvest Moon DS: Island of Happiness with an additional candidate for each gender. The new candidate for the female player is Will, and for the male the new candidate is Lily. After a season of marriage, the player is able to have a child with their spouse. As in the other Harvest Moon games, the player must raise the heart level of the candidate in order to marry.

== Development ==
The American pre-order bonus was a limited edition plush pig that was included with the game when ordered from participating retailers.

== Reception ==
Reception

Aggregate score
| Aggregator | Score |
|---|---|
| Metacritic | 77/100 |

Review scores
| Publication | Score |
|---|---|
| 1Up.com | A− |
| 4Players | 40% |
| Famitsu | (DS) 29/40; 27/40 |
| NGamer | 75% |
| Nintendo Life | 7/10 |
| Nintendo Power | 7/10 |
| Official Nintendo Magazine | 82% |
| RPGamer | 3/5 |
| RPGFan | 75% |

The game received "generally favorable reviews" according to the review aggregation website Metacritic. In Japan, Famitsu gave it a score of one six and three sevens, while Famitsu DS gave it a score of three sevens and one eight.
