= Harvest Moon: Magical Melody =

2005 video game

- North American cover art for the GameCube
- Developer: Marvelous Interactive
- Publishers: JP: Marvelous Interactive; NA: Natsume Inc.; PAL: Rising Star Games; AU: Nintendo
- Director: Tomomi Yamatate
- Designer: Yasuhiro Wada
- Artist: Igusa Matsuyama
- Series: Story of Seasons
- Platforms: GameCube, Wii
- Release: November 10, 2005: GameCube; JP: November 10, 2005; NA: March 28, 2006 Wii; EU: March 14, 2008; AU: April 3, 2008; NA: August 25, 2009
- Genres: Role-playing, social simulation
- Modes: Single-player, multiplayer

Harvest Moon: Magical Melody (牧場物語 しあわせの詩 for ワールド, Bokujō Monogatari: Shiawase no Uta for Wārudo; "Farm Story: Song/Poem of Happiness for World") is a social simulation video game for the GameCube developed by Marvelous Interactive. It is an updated version of Bokujō Monogatari: Shiawase no Uta (牧場物語 しあわせの詩), which was released on March 3, 2005 in Japan. The updated GameCube version was released in the United States by Natsume Inc. on March 28, 2006.

A European release by Rising Star Games with Nintendo of Europe handling distribution was planned, but this release never saw the light of day. Instead, Rising Star Games commissioned an updated version for the GameCube's successor, the Wii instead, which was released on March 14, 2008, with Nintendo of Europe remaining as distributor. The Wii version was later released on April 3, 2008 in Australia, and in North America the following year on August 25, 2009. The game was not released on the Wii in Japan. The Wii version in all territories added motion-sensitive controls for actions such as fishing, mining and foraging but removed the option to play as a female character.

Besides Yasuhiro Wada, Harvest Moon: Magical Melody is the first entry without the involvement of the main developers from Victor Interactive Software.

== Gameplay ==
The game has two main objectives: to wake the Harvest Goddess and to marry one of the townspeople. The player must gather musical notes by finishing various chores and milestones. These tasks are not revealed to the player aside from hints the player can gather based on the name of the notes in the Notes screen of the pause menu. Some are very obvious, such as the Second House note, but others are less obvious such as the Treasure Hoard note. Collecting at least fifty out of a total of one hundred notes lets the player create the titular magical melody that will revive the village's protectress. This does not end the game, which allows the player to continue collecting even more notes and building relationships with the townspeople. The player can choose to be either a male or female character in the GameCube version. Each gender has a choice of ten potential spouses of the opposite sex, along with the androgynous rival Jamie who is eligible for either player gender. The player can have children, own a house and land, and mine, fish, and farm across four seasons. The game includes several minigames in which up to four players can test their skills. Players unlock some minigames through gameplay.

== Reception ==
Reception

Aggregate score
Aggregator	Score	
Aggregator	GameCube	Wii
Metacritic	83/100	69/100

Review scores
Publication	Score	
Publication	GameCube	Wii
Eurogamer	8/10	8/10
Famitsu	31/40 (Cube) 30/40	N/A
GameSpot	8/10	N/A
GameSpy	3.5/5	N/A
GameZone	8.5/10	N/A
IGN	8.2/10	8/10
Nintendo Power	9/10	N/A
Official Nintendo Magazine	N/A	61%
PALGN	N/A	6.5/10
RPGamer	4/5	N/A

The GameCube version received "favorable" reviews, while the Wii version received "average" reviews, according to the review aggregation website Metacritic. In Japan, Famitsu gave the original Shiawase no Uta a score of 31 out of 40, while Famitsu Cube gave its updated version a score of two eights and two sevens for a total of 30 out of 40.
