= Harvest Moon: Tree of Tranquility =

2007 video game

- Developer: Marvelous Interactive
- Publishers: JP: Marvelous Interactive; NA: Natsume Inc.; PAL: Rising Star Games
- Series: Story of Seasons
- Platform: Wii
- Release: JP: June 7, 2007; NA: September 30, 2008; EU: October 9, 2009; AU: October 22, 2009
- Genres: Construction and management simulation, role-playing
- Modes: Single-player, multiplayer

Harvest Moon: Tree of Tranquility (牧場物語 やすらぎの樹, Bokujō Monogatari: Yasuragi no Ki; Harvest Moon: Tree of Peace) is a farming simulation video game released in Japan on June 7, 2007, by Marvelous Interactive, in North America on September 30, 2008, by Natsume Inc., and in the PAL regions in October 2009. It was released for Nintendo Wii console and was the first title in the Story of Seasons series originally developed for the Wii. The video game was followed by a sequel, Harvest Moon: Animal Parade, one year later.

== Plot ==
The player, Kevin or Angela, moves to Waffle Island which was once enchanted, home to the deceased Mother Tree that was once sacred. After the Harvest Goddess vanished, the island lost its connection with nature and its inhabitants do not know what to do. By growing various crops and herbs, tending to and befriending animals, forming friendships, and raising a family, the player volunteers to save the island by bringing its tree back to life. They also meet five Harvest Sprites who help the player on their mission. Eventually, they learn that to revive the tree, they need to seek out a seedling that will grow into a new tree in order for the Harvest Goddess to return. Once that's done, the main story ends.

== Reception ==
Reception

Aggregate score
Aggregator	Score
Metacritic	65/100

Review scores
Publication	Score
1Up.com	C
Famitsu	30/40
Game Informer	6.75/10
GameSpot	6/10
IGN	6.5/10
NGamer	72%
Nintendo Life	5/10
Nintendo Power	6.5/10
Retro Gamer	58%
The Guardian	3/5

The game received "mixed" reviews according to the review aggregation website Metacritic. In Japan, Famitsu gave it a score of 30 out of 40.
