= Harvest Moon: The Tale of Two Towns =

2010 video game

- North American Nintendo DS cover art
- Developer: Marvelous Interactive
- Publishers: JP: Marvelous Interactive; NA: Natsume Inc.; PAL: Rising Star Games
- Director: Takahiro Yura
- Producer: Yoshifumi Hashimoto
- Artist: Igusa Matsuyama
- Composers: Hiroshi Nakajima; Eri Yasuda; Ryou Kinugasa; Kengo Hagiwara
- Series: Story of Seasons
- Platforms: Nintendo DS; Nintendo 3DS
- Release: Nintendo DS: JP: July 8, 2010; NA: September 20, 2011; EU: June 29, 2012; AU: July 5, 2012; Nintendo 3DS: NA: November 1, 2011; EU: June 29, 2012; AU: July 5, 2012
- Genres: Simulation, role-playing
- Modes: Single-player, multiplayer

Harvest Moon: The Tale of Two Towns (Note: Japanese: 牧場物語 ふたごの村, Hepburn: Bokujō Monogatari: Futago no Mura; lit. Ranch Story: Twin Villages) is a farming simulation video game developed by Marvelous Entertainment for the Nintendo DS and Nintendo 3DS as part of the Story of Seasons series. It was released in North America on the Nintendo DS on September 20, 2011 and on the Nintendo 3DS on November 1, 2011 by Natsume Inc. The original release date for the Japanese version was set to February 25, 2010 but was moved to July 8, 2010.

The DS version is titled as Harvest Moon DS and the 3DS version is titled as Harvest Moon 3D. New features in the game include new animals like Alpacas and Honey Bees and a Pickle Pot that can be used to make pickled turnips.

An enhanced 3DS version titled Bokujō Monogatari: Futago no Mura+ was released in Japan on December 14, 2017. It included access to StreetPass and better controls.

== Story ==
Hundreds of years before the events of the game, the towns of Bluebell and Konohana were once friendly neighbor towns connected by a tunnel through a large hill. However, fierce arguments arose over which town's cooking was superior to the other's. During one specific confrontation, the Harvest Goddess grew tired of the bickering and destroyed the tunnel, cutting off a majority of the town's contact. Centuries later the towns are still bitter rivals, only communicating during a weekly cooking festival.

The game begins with the player (male is by default named Phillip and female is by default named Lillian) riding a horse up the mountain between the two towns. On the way, a fox jumps into the middle of the road, causing the player to swerve and fall down a cliff, knocking them unconscious. The player is later found on the ground by Rutger, the mayor of Bluebell, and Ina, the mayor of Konohana. When the player comes to, they realize that they don't remember which town they lived in. Each mayor insists that the player lived in their respective town, but the decision is ultimately up to the player. After settling in one of the villages, the player is then greeted by the Harvest Goddess, who requests for them to help both villages reconcile via the cooking festivals. Once they have ended their rivalry, the Harvest Goddess restores the tunnel and the villagers throw a party to thank the player for their help in restoring their relationship.

== Gameplay ==
The player starts the game by choosing a gender and picking to live in either Bluebell or Konohana. The two towns specialize in different aspects of farming. Bluebell specializes in farm animals while Konohana focuses on crops. The player's farm will have different features depending on which town the player has chosen. Like all other Harvest Moon games, the player must maintain their farm by planting and watering crops, and raising their animals. The player can also fulfill requests that are posted at each towns' message board. Choosing a town will not restrict the player to that town only, the player can travel between towns and interact with all of the townspeople. The player can choose to marry a bachelor or bachelorette, depending on the player's gender, from either town.

=== Cooking Festival ===
The cooking festival is a cooking contest between the two towns. The festival occurs four times each season and the player can choose to either participate in the festival or cheer for the player's own town. Each town has a team of three participants who present a cooked dish to the judge. Whether the player participates in the festival or cheers for their town, the player will gain friendship points that help fill up the friendship meter. Once the meter is full, the towns will return to being friendly neighbors again. The player will gain more points by participating in the festival than they would if they were cheering for their town.

=== Marriage ===
There are 6 bachelors and 6 bachelorettes to choose from. The player must give presents to a marriage candidate and raise their friendship points to a certain level. Once the player has 5000 friendship points with the marriage candidate, the player can take the candidate out on dates. Before marriage can occur, the player must have a big bed in their house and also trigger events that occur on dates. Once all marriage requirements for the marriage candidate are fulfilled, the player can propose with an item called the Blue Feather, which can be bought in shops. After marriage, the player can choose to upgrade the bed and remodel the house to have a child.

== Reception ==
Reception

Aggregate score
Aggregator	Score	
Aggregator	3DS	DS
Metacritic	63/100	68/100

Review scores
Publication	Score	
Publication	3DS	DS
4Players	68%	68%
Famitsu	N/A	32/40
GamePro	3/5	N/A
GameSpot	N/A	6.5/10
IGN	N/A	6/10
Nintendo Life	6/10	N/A
Nintendo Power	7.5/10	8/10
Nintendo World Report	7/10	N/A
Pocket Gamer	4/5	N/A
RPGamer	N/A	3.5/5
Metro	5/10	N/A

The game received "mixed or average reviews" on both platforms according to the review aggregation website Metacritic. In Japan, Famitsu gave the DS version a score of all four eights for a total of 32 out of 40.

Also in Japan, Harvest Moon DS: The Tale of Two Towns was Marvelous Interactive's best selling game in 2010 with sales of 230,000 units.
