= Harvest Moon: Friends of Mineral Town =

2003 video game

- Developer: Marvelous Interactive
- Publishers: JP: Marvelous Interactive; NA/EU: Natsume Inc.; Remake: WW: Marvelous; NA: Xseed Games
- Producer: Yasuhiro Wada
- Designer: Miki Miyagi
- Artist: Igusa Matsuyama
- Composer: Ai Yamashita
- Series: Harvest Moon
- Platforms: Game Boy Advance; Remake; Nintendo Switch; Microsoft Windows; Xbox One; PlayStation 4
- Release: Game Boy Advance April 18, 2003: Friends of Mineral Town; JP: April 18, 2003; NA: November 17, 2003; EU: March 26, 2004 More Friends of Mineral Town; JP: December 12, 2003; NA: July 26, 2005; Remake October 17, 2019: Nintendo Switch; JP: October 17, 2019; PAL: July 10, 2020; NA: July 14, 2020 Microsoft Windows; WW: July 10, 2020 Xbox One; PAL: October 15, 2021; NA: October 26, 2021; JP: October 27, 2021 PlayStation 4; PAL: October 15, 2021; NA: October 26, 2021; JP: November 25, 2021
- Genres: Simulation, Role-playing
- Mode: Single player

Harvest Moon: Friends of Mineral Town (Note: Japanese: 牧場物語 ミネラルタウンのなかまたち, Hepburn: Bokujō Monogatari: Mineral Town no Nakama Tachi) is a video game for the Game Boy Advance, developed and published by Marvelous Interactive. It is the first Game Boy Advance game of the Story of Seasons series, and is a remake of Harvest Moon: Back to Nature. It was first released in Japan in April 2003, in North America in November 2003, and in Europe in March 2004. Many critics praised it as the best entry of the series, combining elements from the best-selling console entries and introducing many notable series staples. It was later released on the Virtual Console for the Wii U in June 2015.

The player is a farmer whose goal is to make a profit from the farm he runs by producing crops and raising livestock.

A 3D remake of the game was released for the Nintendo Switch, titled Story of Seasons: Friends of Mineral Town.

== Story and gameplay ==
In-game screenshot

The player character in the game has no default name. In the opening sequences, the player is shown as a young boy living in the city, whose parents take him to see the country. During their trip, the player becomes lost, and finds himself on the farm of an old man in Mineral Town. The old man helps the player contact his parents, and offers to let him and his family stay for a few days, as he has no family of his own. The player's parents agree, and the player stays on the farm for a while. On the farm, the player plays with a girl who then becomes friends with him. After the player leaves Mineral Town, he continues to write letters to the old man. One day, when he has grown up, the letters from the old man suddenly stop. The player travels to Mineral Town, finding the farm neglected, and discovers the old man had died around half a year ago. The mayor of Mineral Town informs the player that in the farmer's will, he left the player the farm. The player decides to restore the farm, beginning the game.

The player starts with several tools, and must earn money by clearing the large field on the farm and planting crops, mining, or foraging. This money may be used to buy other things, such as livestock, and to expand the farm. The social aspect of Harvest Moon: Friends of Mineral Town is a large part of the game. There are many villagers to befriend, and six bachelorettes available to marry. Befriending villagers allows the player to learn recipes and discover villager's histories, and marriage allows the player to have a son. The game offers connectivity with the Nintendo GameCube game Harvest Moon: A Wonderful Life using a link cable between the Game Boy Advance and Nintendo GameCube.

The player begins with a dog that may be named. The dog starts as a puppy, but will be fully grown after two months. Shortly after meeting Barley for the first time, he will stop by the player's farm with a young horse and ask if they can take care of it. If the player accepts, Barley will return after a year, and may take the horse back if the player did not show enough affection. There are three kinds of livestock: cows, chickens, and sheep. Cows produce milk (requires a milker to be gathered), chickens produce eggs, and sheep produce wool (requires shears to be gathered), which can be shipped off to be sold. As in every installment of the Story of Seasons series, shipping is added as a collection of crops, flowers, animal items and others.

== Harvest Moon: More Friends of Mineral Town ==
Reception

Aggregate score
Aggregator	Score
Metacritic	82/100

Harvest Moon: More Friends of Mineral Town (牧場物語 ミネラルタウンのなかまたち for ガール, Bokujō Monogatari: Mineral Town no Nakama Tachi for Girl) is the female version of Harvest Moon: Friends of Mineral Town, released in Japan in December 2003, and in North America in July 2005. In this game, the main character is a girl, and can marry one of eight bachelors. The player starts in the city, reading their newspaper. She sees an advertisement for a beautiful farm, and, excited by the prospect of rural life, decides to buy it. She visits the farm and finds out she was tricked, as the farm is run down and in need of maintenance. As she had already quit her job and sold her apartment, the player resolves to make the farm prosper the best she can, beginning the game. The base game is mostly identical, with the exception of several gameplay changes, improvements, and fixes.

== Reception ==
Reception

Aggregate score
Aggregator	Score
Metacritic	81/100

IGN rated Harvest Moon: Friends of Mineral Town at 8.9, or "great", saying that it was "deceptively engrossing", and that the graphical presentation of the day to night cycles was very well done. GameRankings has an aggregate score of 82% from 31 reviews. IGN rated Harvest Moon: More Friends of Mineral Town at 8.5. It was noted that it is essentially a repeat of Harvest Moon: Friends of Mineral Town, but that "it's still a great and highly recommended experience". GameRankings has an aggregate score of 79% from 14 reviews.

== Remake ==
A 3D remake, Story of Seasons: Friends of Mineral Town, was released for the Nintendo Switch in Japan and Taiwan on October 17, 2019, in Europe on July 10, 2020, and in North America on July 14, 2020. A Microsoft Windows version was also released on July 14. The remake was later ported to Xbox One and PlayStation 4. Both versions were released on October 15 in Europe, and October 26, 2021, in North America. In Japan, the game was first released for Xbox One on October 27, 2021, followed by PlayStation 4 on November 25, 2021.
