= Harvest Moon 2 GBC =

1999 video game

- Developer: Victor Interactive Software
- Publishers: JP: Victor Interactive Software; NA/EU: Natsume Inc.
- Series: Story of Seasons
- Platforms: Game Boy Color, 3DS Virtual Console
- Release: Game Boy Color: JP: August 6, 1999; NA: November 7, 2000; PAL: March 30, 2001; 3DS Virtual Console: NA: October 16, 2014
- Genre: Simulation/role-playing video game
- Mode: Single-player

Harvest Moon 2 GBC, released in Japan as Bokujō Monogatari GB2 (牧場物語GB2), is a farming simulation video game for the Game Boy Color developed and published by Victor Interactive Software, and the second portable game in the Story of Seasons series. The object of the game is to cultivate a farm to prevent the land from being used to build an amusement park. As with the previous game, the player may choose to play as a boy or a girl.

== Gameplay ==
There are several differences between this game and the previous installments on the Game Boy. Some major differences between Harvest Moon GB and Harvest Moon 2 GBC is that in Harvest Moon 2 GBC one is able to build a sheep pen and buy sheep, build a greenhouse, and walk around the town. The initial goal is that in three years time, the player must bring up the farm by growing and selling crops, and raising livestock. There are also plenty of secrets to unlock in the game. At the end of the first year, the mayor of the city comes back to the farm to check up on it. If he thinks it's looking good, the player may continue the game for another couple years. If he thinks the farm is short of success, a second chance is given to revitalize the farm.

=== Crops ===
Crops are a primary source of income in Harvest Moon 2 GBC. After being planted, the seeds must be watered every day until they can be harvested, when it is possible to sell them. Some plants that are harvested may produce more than a single batch of crops from the same plant system, allowing some crops to be harvested more than once. Crops may be grown in any of the four seasons. If you build a hothouse, it is also possible to grow flowers and herbs, regardless of season.

=== Animals ===
At the beginning of the game, the option is given whether to have a dog or cat. The pets will slightly affect the gameplay. Pets have various abilities that make them beneficial to the farm. The dog will keep wild dogs or foxes away from your farm at night, and the cat sometimes brings seeds to your house. Pets must be left outside overnight to use their abilities. You seem to be able to keep them outdoors even in bad weather. The player after a certain period of time (Fall 1st, First year, usually) is able to acquire a horse, which can be ridden (once it is an adult horse, which takes until the Second year, Spring 2nd) and used for farm work as well.

The livestock in this game are cows, chickens, and sheep. Cows produce milk. A cow with 8 or more hearts will produce Large Milk and a cow that has less than that will produce Small Milk. They become agitated and stop producing milk for three days if the farmer is unable to feed them (due to the farmer getting a cold or a storm/bad weather); if the player feeds them and brushes them, after 3 days they should restart milk production. The player can acquire up to four cows. Chickens produce one egg per day, unless they are agitated. Similar to cows, feeding them for 3 days straight should make them lay eggs again. The player can acquire up to four chickens. Sheep produce wool. When sheep have a higher happiness rating, they produce large pieces of wool, which sell for 250G apiece. As with cows, they become agitated (and stay grumpy) for three days if the farmer is unable to feed them; feeding them and shampooing them for 3 days straight should make them happy again. One can have up to four sheep. They still produce wool even if agitated. Sheep will regrow their wool every 9 days.

=== Tools and Items ===
There is a wide variety of tools in Harvest Moon 2 GBC. Tools are used to carry out chores, care for livestock, and tend to crops.

=== Collecting and Trading ===
The game was the first in the series to introduce a wildlife collecting mechanic. For the first time fish were not categorized by size (small, medium, large) like in previous entries, but were instead categorized by their individual species. The player was also able to capture insects in the mountain area (a series first). The species of fish and insects that the player caught would be displayed in the picture books located in the library in town.

The fish and insects that the player caught (as well as flowers that the player grew) could also be traded by Game Link Cable to other copies of Harvest Moon 2 GBC or to the game Legend of the River King 2. This was done in game through the computer in the library. There were species of Fish, Insects, and Flowers that could only be obtained through trading.

=== Mini-Games ===
The game had a number of unlockable mini-games that could be achieved throughout game play. After the player unlocked one, it could be accessed at any time from the TV in the player's house.

== Reception ==
Reception

Aggregate score
Aggregator	Score
GameRankings	78%

Review scores
Publication	Score
AllGame	3/5
Famitsu	30/40
IGN	7/10
Nintendo Power	7.6/10

The game received favorable reviews according to the review aggregation website GameRankings. IGN said that the game world is much bigger than the first Harvest Moon, and the farming much improved, but the dating sim aspect of the game is greatly missed. In Japan, Famitsu gave it a score of 30 out of 40.
