= Harvest Moon: A Wonderful Life =

2003 video game

- North American GameCube cover art
- Developer: Marvelous Interactive
- Publishers: JP: Marvelous Interactive; WW: Natsume Inc. (GCN); EU: 505 Game Street (PS2); Remake: WW: Marvelous; NA: Xseed Games
- Series: Harvest Moon
- Platforms: GameCube, PlayStation 2
- Release: September 12, 2003: GameCube; JP: September 12, 2003; NA: March 16, 2004; EU: March 26, 2004 PlayStation 2; JP: November 11, 2004; NA: October 27, 2005; EU: November 16, 2005
- Genres: Simulation, role-playing
- Mode: Single-player

Harvest Moon: A Wonderful Life (Note: Japanese: 牧場物語～ワンダフルライフ, Hepburn: Bokujō Monogatari: Wandafuru Raifu) is a video game that was released in Japan in September 2003 and March 2004 in North America for the GameCube. It was developed and published by Marvelous Interactive in Japan, while Natsume Inc. published it worldwide), and is part of the long-running Story of Seasons video game series. The GameCube version offers connectivity with the Game Boy Advance game, Harvest Moon: Friends of Mineral Town.

A special edition version titled Harvest Moon: A Wonderful Life Special Edition was released on the PlayStation 2 in Japan in 2004 and North America in 2005. It was later re-released on the PlayStation 3 and PlayStation 4 with improvements upon lag issues stemming from the PlayStation 2 port. Harvest Moon: Another Wonderful Life, the female version of Harvest Moon: A Wonderful Life, was released for the GameCube outside Japan in July 2005.

A remake, Story of Seasons: A Wonderful Life, was released for the Nintendo Switch, PlayStation 5, Windows, and Xbox Series X/S, on June 27, 2023.

== Plot ==
Harvest Moon: A Wonderful Life begins with the male player (who is by default named Mark) moving to the city to inherit an abandoned farm in Forget-Me-Not Valley. A man named Takakura, who is an old friend of his father, provides him a house, some seeds, and a cow for free. He explains the player the basics of farming and introduces him to the villagers from this point on.

The game has up to six chapters. By the end of the first chapter, the player must marry one of the bachelorettes or else the game will end, which will also occur if the player fails his married life, resulting in a divorce. After marriage, he will have a son who will grow older as time passes. The son's career can be swayed through certain actions. In the end of the final chapter, the son becomes a full grown adult and the player dies of unnatural causes, leaving his family and friends devastated. The son will then undergo his career depending on the player's actions.

== Related games ==
An updated version titled Oh! A Wonderful Life was released in Japan for the PlayStation 2 in November 2004. The English version was titled A Wonderful Life Special Edition and released in late 2005. While very similar to the original version of A Wonderful Life, some extra items and events were added in addition to an updated soundtrack. The most notable changes were the ability to have a daughter instead of a son, the ability to marry Lumina, and the ability to continue playing after death. On May 16, 2017, it was announced that a remake of the Special Edition was scheduled for the PS4 with a tentative 2017 release planned.

In July 2005, Another Wonderful Life, which consists of a female protagonist (named Pony by default), was released. In this game, the player instead meets Takakura on the beach before heading to the farm. The rest of the story is the same, except the player must marry one of the bachelors.

Marvelous Interactive released a remake version of A Wonderful Life under the Story of Seasons main title on June 27, 2023. In this game, the main characters' default names are Sion and Maya, some of the characters have different names and appearances, the farm itself along with some of the locations also have a few changes, the chapters have been renamed, and new scenes are included. The intro begins with Takakura receiving a letter from the player before meeting them at the village entrance and escorting them to the farm. The player can marry any of the bachelors or bachelorettes from the previous versions, regardless of gender, along with an additional bachelor, Gordy.

== Reception ==
Reception

Aggregate scores
Aggregator	Score
GameRankings	NGC: 80% (Another) 72%
Metacritic	NGC: 79/100 (Another) 70/100

Review scores
Publication	Score
GameSpot	8.7/10; 5/10 (Another)
IGN	8/10

Harvest Moon: A Wonderful Life received largely positive reviews upon its initial GameCube release. IGN gave the title an "Impressive" 8 out of 10 rating, praising gameplay and lasting appeal while also noting its "monotonous" audio and upsetting lack of festivals. A Wonderful Life garnered an 8.7 rating from Ryan Davis of GameSpot. Echoing other reviews, Davis considered it "a fun and potentially addictive game that, if you let it, will gladly consume any free time you choose to give it." The publication went on to name it the best GameCube game of March 2004.

The Special Edition released for PlayStation 2 did not receive such strong praise. IGN's Juan Castro gave it a score of 6/10 and remarked "The differences, including an increase in brides, choosing the gender of your child and the ability to play forever, make little difference. What does make a difference, though, is the drastic drop in framerate, increase in load times and muddy graphics." Official UK PlayStation 2 Magazine gave it a 7/10 rating.

== Remake ==
A remake, Story of Seasons: A Wonderful Life, was announced at the Nintendo Direct on September 13, 2022, and later released for the Nintendo Switch in Japan on January 26, 2023, and in North America and Europe on June 27, 2023, for Nintendo Switch, Microsoft Windows, Xbox Series X|S and PlayStation 5.

Marvelous added same-sex relationships to the game as well as the option to make the player character non-binary.

The reception for the remake was mixed, with Destructoid's CJ Andriessen calling the game a "remarkable experience". However, GameSpot's Jess Howard considered it "empty and stuck in the past."
