= Harvest Moon GB =

1997 video game

- Developer: Victor Interactive Software
- Publishers: JP: Victor Interactive Software; NA: Natsume Inc.; EU: Nintendo
- Series: Story of Seasons
- Platforms: Game Boy, Game Boy Color
- Release: Game Boy: JP: December 19, 1997; NA: August 1998; Game Boy Color: NA: November 25, 1999; EU: January 10, 1999
- Genres: Life simulation, role-playing
- Mode: Single-player

Harvest Moon GB (牧場物語GB, Bokujō Monogatari GB) is the second game in the Story of Seasons series of video games, and was developed and published by Victor Interactive Software. Harvest Moon GB is the first portable Harvest Moon game, developed for the Game Boy. A Game Boy Color version was released later under the name Harvest Moon GBC. The Game Boy Color version was later released on the 3DS Virtual Console in 2013.

== Gameplay ==
Before beginning, the player is able to choose whether to play as a girl or a boy, and name themselves. At the beginning of the game, the player's deceased grandfather visits them as a spirit and asks them to take over his farm. He implores them to succeed him as a Ranch Master, stating he will check on the player at the end of each winter to determine their progress. The player must develop their farm by growing and selling crops, and raising livestock to reach this goal. If the player's farm meets his criteria to be a Ranch Master, the player may receive extra tools; if he thinks the farm does not, a game over is given.

=== Crops ===
Crops are the primary source of income in Harvest Moon GB. Different seeds can be sown during different seasons, but any seed sown outside of its designated season will not sprout. After being planted, the seeds must be watered every day until they can be harvested. All harvested crops (along with anything able to be sold) may be put in the shipping bin to be sold. Almost all crops require active farming and maintenance, although every day, the player can harvest two mushrooms from their underground cellar to sell.

=== Animals ===
Either a dog or a cat may be chosen as a pet. If a cat is chosen, wild dogs will not attack chickens; if a dog is picked, moles will not destroy crops. The player receives a horse early in the game, which when grown can be used for farm work, riding, and shipping items.

There are two types of livestock - cows and chickens. Cows can produce milk, which can be turned into cheese and butter, and chickens produce eggs. Both livestock can reproduce: cows by giving them Miracle Potion (equivalent to artificial insemination), and chickens by hatching their eggs.

=== Tools and items ===
There are a wide variety of tools in Harvest Moon GB. At the beginning of the game, the tools available are the axe, hoe, hammer, watering can (obtained after buying the first crop seeds), and sickle. These tools may be improved, turning into "super" tools. The player may also receive a fishing rod, pickaxe and umbrella after reaching their grandfather's goal.

== Reception ==
Reception

Aggregate score
Aggregator	Score
GameRankings	(GBC) 72%

Review scores
Publication	Score
Famitsu	8/10, 8/10, 6/10, 7/10
GameSpot	7.4/10
IGN	6/10
Total Game Boy	92%

Harvest Moon GB was fairly well received, earning a 7.2/10 review from Nintendo Power. GameSpot gave it a 7.4/10, saying the game found it to be a relaxing and rewarding simulation of farm life while saying players should wait for the Game Boy Color version. IGN gave the GBC version a 6.0/10, saying "Without the dating aspects and with only a few mini-quests to play through, Harvest Moon GBC is a lightweight version of a feathery game." Total Game Boy praised the game, stating the gameplay was "extremely rewarding", praising the "certain charm" of the "childlike quality" of the game's tone.
