= List of Marvelous Entertainment games =

This is a list of games by Marvelous Entertainment. This list pertains to games that were published March 31, 2003 onward, after the purchase of Victor Interactive Software was complete. Games published by the privately owned subsidiary Rising Star Games in Europe are also included on this list.

== Microsoft Windows ==
Title	Date	Developer	Region(s)
Half-Minute Hero: Super Mega Neo Climax	September 27, 2012	Marvelous Entertainment	NA
Half-Minute Hero: The Second Coming	April 24, 2014	Marvelous Entertainment	NA

== Xbox 360 ==
Title	Date	Developer	Region(s)
Deadly Premonition (NA) / Red Seeds Profile (JP)	February 2010	Access Games	NA / JP
No More Heroes: Heroes' Paradise	April 2010	Feelplus	JP
Half-Minute Hero: Super Mega Neo Climax (Xbox Live Arcade)	June 2011	Marvelous Entertainment	NA / JP

== Game Boy Advance ==
Title	Date	Developer	Region(s)
The King of Fighters EX: Neo Blood	January 1, 2002	Marvelous Entertainment	JP / NA / EU
The King of Fighters EX2: Howling Blood	January 1, 2003	Marvelous Entertainment / Sun-Tec	JP / NA
Harvest Moon: Friends of Mineral Town	April 2003	Marvelous Entertainment	JP / AUS
Harvest Moon: More Friends of Mineral Town	December 2003	Marvelous Entertainment	JP / AUS
CIMA: The Enemy	October 2005	Neverland	JP
Legend of the River King 3 & 4	October 2005		JP

== Nintendo GameCube ==
Title	Date	Developer	Region(s)
Harvest Moon: A Wonderful Life	September 2003	Marvelous Entertainment	JP / NA / EU
Harvest Moon: Another Wonderful Life	August 2004	Marvelous Entertainment	JP / NA
Harvest Moon: Magical Melody	November 2005	Marvelous Entertainment	JP / NA / EU

== Nintendo DS ==
Title	Date	Developer	Region(s)
Harvest Moon DS	March 2005	Marvelous Entertainment	JP / EU / AUS
Space Invaders Revolution	July 2005		EU
Lunar: Dragon Song	August 2005	Japan Art Media	JP / EU
Urusei Yatsura: Endless Summer	October 2005		JP
Bubble Bobble Revolution	December 2005	Dreams	EU / AUS
Harvest Moon DS Cute	December 2005	Marvelous Entertainment	JP
Ys Strategy	March 2006	Future Creates	JP / EU
Contact	March 2006	Grasshopper Manufacture	JP / EU / AUS
Rainbow Islands Revolution	April 2006	Dreams	EU / AUS
SBK: Snowboard Kids	April 2006	racjin	EU / AUS
Rune Factory: A Fantasy Harvest Moon	August 2006	Neverland	JP / EU / AUS
Negima!?: Chou Mahora Taisen Kattoiin, Keiyaku Shikkou Dechai masuu	October 2006	Natsume Co., Ltd.	JP
Harvest Moon: Island of Happiness	February 2007	Marvelous Entertainment	JP / AUS
New Zealand Story Revolution	February 2007	Dreams	EU / AUS
Luminous Arc	February 2007	imageepoch	JP / EU / AUS
Negima!?: Chou Mahora Taisen Chuu	March 2007	Natsume Co., Ltd.	JP
River King: Mystic Valley	June 2007		JP / EU
Rune Factory 2: A Fantasy Harvest Moon	January 2008	Neverland	JP
Flower, Sun, and Rain: Murder and Mystery in Paradise	March 2008	Grasshopper Manufacture, h.a.n.d.	JP
Bomberman Story DS	March 2008	Hudson Soft	EU / AUS
Bomberman Land Touch! 2	March 2008	Hudson Soft	EU / AUS
Lux-Pain	March 2008	Killaware	JP / EU
Dungeon Explorer: Warriors of Ancient Arts	April 2008	Hudson Soft	EU / AUS
Luminous Arc 2 Will	May 2008	imageepoch	JP
Eco Creatures: Save the Forest	May 2008	Leightweight, Headlock	EU / AUS
Steal Princess	July 2008	Climax Entertainment	JP
LOL	August 2008	skip	EU
To Love-Ru -Trouble- Waku Waku! Rinkangakkō-hen	August 2008		JP
Dungeon Maker	September 2008	Global A	EU / AUS
Avalon Code	November 2008	Matrix Software	JP / NA
Sakura Note: Ima ni Tsunagaru Mirai	September 2009	Audio Games	JP
Rune Factory 3	October 2009	Neverland	JP
Luminous Arc 3 Eyes	December 2009	imageepoch	JP
PostPet DS	December 2009	Alphadream	JP
Livly Garden	January 2010		JP
Harvest Moon: The Tale of Two Towns	July 2010	Marvelous Entertainment	JP

== Wii ==
Title	Date	Developer	Region(s)
Harvest Moon: Tree of Tranquility	June 2007	Marvelous Entertainment	JP / NA / EU / AUS
Mahō Sensei Negima!? Neo-Pactio Fight!!	June 2007	Shade	JP
No More Heroes	December 2007	Grasshopper Manufacture	JP / EU / AUS
Katekyo Hitman Reborn! Dream Hyper Battle!	January 2008	Shade	JP
Harvest Moon: Magical Melody	March 2008	Marvelous Entertainment	EU / AUS
Bomberman Land	March 2008	racjin	EU / AUS
Super Swing Golf	August 2008	Tecmo	EU / AUS
Baroque	August 2008	Sting Entertainment	JP / NA / EU
Rune Factory Frontier	November 2008	Neverland	JP / NA / EU
Little King's Story	July 2009	Town Factory, Cing	JP / NA / EU / AUS
Muramasa: The Demon Blade	September 2009	Vanillaware	JP / NA /EU
No More Heroes 2: Desperate Struggle	January 2010	Grasshopper Manufacture	JP / NA / EU
Valhalla Knights: Eldar Saga	September 2009	K2 LLC	JP / NA
Arc Rise Fantasia	June 2010	imageepoch	JP / NA
Rune Factory: Tides of Destiny	February 2011	Neverland	JP / NA / EU
Ikenie no Yoru	March 2011	Marvelous Entertainment	JP

== Nintendo 3DS ==
Title	Date	Developer	Region(s)
Zoo Resort 3D	May 2011	AQ Interactive	JP
Fish Eyes 3D	June 2011	Marvelous Entertainment	JP
Senran Kagura Burst	August 2012	Tamsoft	JP / NA / PAL
Bokujou Monogatari: Hajimari no Daichi / Harvest Moon 3D: A New Beginning	February 2012	Marvelous Entertainment	JP / NA / PAL
Rune Factory 4	July 2012	Neverland (company)	JP / NA / PAL
Story of Seasons	February 2014	Marvelous Entertainment	JP / NA / PAL
Senran Kagura 2: Deep Crimson	August 2014	Tamsoft	JP / NA / PAL
Return to PopoloCrois: A Story of Seasons Fairytale	June 2015	Epics / Marvelous AQL	JP / NA / PAL
Story of Seasons: Trio of Towns	June 2016	Marvelous Entertainment	JP / NA / PAL

== PlayStation 2 ==
Title	Date	Developer	Region(s)
Inaka Kurashi: Minami no Shima no Monogatari	September 2002		JP
Fish Eyes 3	June 2003		JP
Rhapsody of Zephyr	January 2004	Softmax	JP
GUNSLINGER GIRL vol.1	April 2004		JP
UFC: Sudden Impact	April 2004	Opus	JP
GUNSLINGER GIRL vol.2	June 2004		JP
XIII	August 2004	Ubisoft Paris	JP
GUNSLINGER GIRL vol.3	August 2004		JP
Broken Sword: The Sleeping Dragon	September 2004	Revolution Software	JP
The Great Escape	October 2004	Pivotal Games	JP
Harvest Moon: A Wonderful Life Special Edition	November 2004	Marvelous Entertainment	JP
River King: A Wonderful Journey	January 2005		JP
Tian Xing: Swords of Destiny	February 2005	Artoon	JP / EU
Make Your Dream Home 2! Takumi	February 2005		JP
Gakkou wo Tsukurou Happy Days!!	March 2005		JP
BECK: The Game	March 2005		JP
Futakoi Alternative: Koi to Shoujo to Machinegun	June 2005		JP
Mai-HiME: Unmei no Keitōju	June 2005		JP
School Rumble Neru Musume ha Sodatsu.	July 2005		JP
Make Your Dream Home 2! Kantan Sekkei!!	February 2006		JP
Dessert Love Sweet Plus	February 2006		JP
Kashimashi ~Girl Meets Girl~ Hajimete no Natsu Monogatari	March 2006		JP
School Rumble Ni-Gakki	July 2006		JP
Cluster Edge: The Pass you Hold to the Future	September 2006		JP
Princess Princess	October 2006		JP
Ah! My Goddess!	February 2007		JP
Gakuen Utopia Manabi Straight! Kira Kira ☆ Happy Festa!	March 2007		JP
Innocent Life: A Futuristic Harvest Moon	March 2007	ArtePiazza	JP
Binchō-tan	April 2007		JP
Simoun Ibara Sensō ~Fūin no Ri Mājon~	June 2007		JP
Ikki Tousen: Shining Dragon	July 2007	Idea Factory	JP
Baroque	August 2008		EU
Hanamuko Romanesque	May 2008		JP
Junjo Romantica: Pure Romance	November 2008		JP

== PlayStation Portable ==
Title	Date	Developer	Region(s)
AI Igo	December 2004		JP
AI Mahjong	December 2004		JP
AI Shogi	January 2005		JP
Space Invaders: Galaxy Beat	September 2005		JP / EU
Harvest Moon: Boy & Girl	November 2005		JP
Innocent Life: A Futuristic Harvest Moon	April 2006	ArtePiazza	JP / EU
Bubble Bobble Evolution	July 2006		JP / EU
Valhalla Knights	August 2006	K2 LLC	JP / EU
Pilot Academy	September 2006		JP / EU
Fish Eyes Portable	September 2006		JP
Rainbow Islands Evolution	February 2007		JP / EU
Bomberman Land	March 2008		EU
Umihara Kawase Portable	March 2008	Rocket Studios	JP
Dungeon Explorer: Warriors of Ancient Arts	March 2008		EU
Valhalla Knights 2	May 2008	K2 LLC	JP / NA
R-Type Command	September 2008	irem	EU
Ikki Tousen: Eloquent Fist	October 2008	Tamsoft	JP
Harvest Moon: Hero of Leaf Valley	May 2009		JP
Valhalla Knights 2: Battle Stance	June 2009	K2 LLC	JP / NA
To Love-Ru -Trouble- Doki Doki! Rinkaigakkō-hen	July 2009		JP
Half-Minute Hero	October 2009	Marvelous Entertainment	JP / EU
Ikki Tousen: Xross Impact	April 2010	Tamsoft	JP
Fate/Extra	July 2010	Type-Moon, Imageepoch	JP
Half-Minute Hero 2	August 2011	Marvelous Entertainment	JP
Grand Knights History	September 2011	Vanillaware	JP

== PlayStation 3 ==
Title	Date	Developer	Region(s)
Red Seeds Profile	March 2010	Access Games	JP
No More Heroes: Heroes' Paradise	April 2010	Feelplus	JP
Rune Factory Oceans	February 2011	Neverland	JP
No More Heroes: Red Zone Edition	July 2011	AQ Interactive	JP

== Arcade ==
Title	Date	Developer	Region(s)
Dengen Tenshi Taisen Janshi Shangri-la: Cyber Angel Mahjong Battle	August 1999	Marvelous Entertainment	JP

== Unreleased ==
- Harvest Moon Online
