= Rune Factory =

Video game series

- Rune Factory series logo used in the main series games. Spin-off titles use their own font and styling.
- Genres: Role-playing; Social simulation
- Developers: Neverland (2006–2013); Hakama; (2019–present); Marvelous First Studio (Guardians of Azuma)
- Publishers: Marvelous; Natsume Inc.; Rising Star Games; Sega; Xseed Games
- Creator: Yoshifumi Hashimoto
- Artist: Minako Iwasaki
- Composer: Tomoko Morita
- Platforms: Windows; Nintendo DS; Nintendo 3DS; Nintendo Switch; Nintendo Switch 2; PlayStation 3; PlayStation 4; PlayStation 5; Wii; Xbox One; Xbox Series X/S
- First release: Rune Factory: A Fantasy Harvest Moon; August 24, 2006
- Latest release: Rune Factory: Guardians of Azuma; June 5, 2025
- Parent series: Story of Seasons

Rune Factory (Note: Japanese: ルーンファクトリー, Hepburn: Rūn Fakutorī) is a franchise of fantasy role-playing social simulation games created by Yoshifumi Hashimoto and primarily published by Marvelous. (Note: Other third-party companies such as Natsume Inc., Rising Star Games and Sega have published titles outside Japan. Xseed Games, a Marvelous subsidiary, began handling North American publishing duties in 2011.) The games are developed by Hashimoto's studio Hakama, taking over from Neverland after they ceased operations in 2013. The series began as a spin-off to Marvelous' flagship franchise Story of Seasons (formerly Harvest Moon). (Note: The series is known as Farm Story (牧場物語, Bokujō Monogatari) in Japan. Internationally, the series was previously published as Harvest Moon until 2014. For this article, the title Story of Seasons is used in preference to Harvest Moon, except when referring to direct quotes or specific game titles.) The Story of Seasons references were subsequently dropped starting with the second installment, in order to become its own series. With the first game published in 2006, the property consists of five main-series games, three spin-off titles and numerous manga adaptations.

Rune Factory retains the farming and social simulation portions of the Story of Seasons games, but integrates it into a fantasy setting and introduces dungeon crawling elements into the core gameplay. The basic premise of most Rune Factory games is to play as a hero who has lost their memory, but must save the land from peril at the hands of an evil enemy, while uncovering their memories. The title of the series refers to the recurring game mechanic of "rune points" and runes that can be earned by completing a variety of tasks, such as growing crops, crafting items and leveling up skills.

As of May 2022, the Rune Factory series has shipped more than 1.5 million copies worldwide. Most individual entries have been positively received, the series as a whole has been lauded for its open-ended gameplay, world design and writing, and it has been favourably compared to the aforementioned Story of Seasons games.

== Titles ==
Release timeline
2006	Rune Factory: A Fantasy Harvest Moon
2007
2008	Rune Factory 2
2008	Rune Factory Frontier
2009	Rune Factory 3
2010
2011	Rune Factory: Tides of Destiny
2012	Rune Factory 4
2013–2020
2021	Rune Factory 5
2022–2024
2025	Rune Factory: Guardians of Azuma

=== Games ===
Rune Factory spans seven different games set in the same shared universe. Despite the loose connections between each entry, they each feature their own cast of characters, setting, and story, so the numbers mostly refer to episodes rather than to sequels. As of 2023, there are five numbered main entries to the franchise, as well as two enhanced ports and three spin-offs, including a direct sequel to the first game.

==== Main series ====
- Rune Factory: A Fantasy Harvest Moon is the first game in the series, released in Japan on August 24, 2006 for the Nintendo DS. It was originally released as a spin-off title of the Story of Seasons franchise for its tenth anniversary. It introduced players to the nations, races, and lore of the series. Set in the small mountain town of Kardia, the story follows Raguna, an amnesiac who finds a new purpose after he agrees to work on a farm owned by a young woman named Mist. The game was later released in North America on August 14, 2007, in Europe on February 13, 2009, and in Australia on March 12, 2009.
- Rune Factory 2 is the second game in the series, released in Japan on January 3, 2008 for the Nintendo DS. Set several years after the first game ends, this installment is set in the coastal city of Alvarna. The story is split into two parts: the first half of the game follows Kyle, a mysterious man with a connection to the legendary dragon Fiersome, while the second half of the game features Kyle's child searching for their father after he disappears. Rune Factory 2 was released in North America on November 18, 2008, in Europe on October 8, 2010, and in Australia on November 18, 2010.
- Rune Factory 3 is the third entry in the main series, released in Japan on October 22, 2009 for the Nintendo DS. The game presents the central theme of the delicate balance of nature, and introduces the conflict between humans and the Univir races. The protagonist, Micah, discovers that he is half-monster and decides to keep his true nature a secret from the other villagers. His goal is to revive the strange Sharance Tree and prevent the surrounding land from decaying, while also attempting to rebuild trust between the Univir and humans. The game was released in North America on November 9, 2010, and in the UK and Australia on September 30, 2011.
  - An enhanced Nintendo Switch and PC port titled Rune Factory 3 Special was released in 2023. Its updates include enhanced visuals, a "Hell" difficulty option, and a fully-voiced Newlywed Mode for each of its eleven bachelorettes, akin to Rune Factory 4 Special.
- Rune Factory 4 is the fourth game in the main series, released in Japan on July 19, 2012 for the Nintendo 3DS. Similar to Rune Factory 2, this entry is separated into several acts, and introduces a third main story arc. The player follows either Lest or Frey, who lands in the small town of Selphia after being thrown out of an airship. After being saved by Ventuswill, an elder dragon, the protagonist is mistaken for a member of the Norad royal family by the townspeople, and is forced to investigate the mysterious forces at work in the nearby dungeons. It was released in North America on January 24, 2013. After the physical release of the game was cancelled in Europe and Australia, it was later released as a Nintendo eShop exclusive in PAL territories on December 11, 2014.
  - An enhanced port of the game titled Rune Factory 4 Special was released in Japan on July 25, 2019 for the Nintendo Switch. This version features enhanced graphics, additional cutscenes, a more challenging "Hell" difficulty option, and uses Live2D technology for the additional Newlywed mode. It was released in Hong Kong and South Korea on December 5, 2019, in North America on February 25, 2020, and in PAL regions on February 28, 2020. The game has been supported by an expansion pack titled Another Episode, that adds twelve additional side stories. Further customization options have also been made available via downloadable content. The game was released worldwide for the PlayStation 4, Xbox One and Windows on December 7, 2021 with the expansion pack and downloadable content included.
- Rune Factory 5 is the fifth game in the main series, released in Japan on May 20, 2021, for the Nintendo Switch. The game takes place in the border town of Rigbarth, and focuses on either Ares or Alice, who joins a group of peacekeeping rangers known as Seed, as stability in the Kingdom of Norad is threatened. It is the first game in the series to include same-sex marriage. This feature is available from release in the North American and PAL region versions of the game, and inserted as a future patch for all other regions. Rune Factory 5 was released in Hong Kong and South Korea on September 2, 2021, and was later released in North America on March 22, 2022, as well as PAL regions on March 25, 2022. A Microsoft Windows port was released worldwide on July 13, 2022.

==== Sequels and spin-offs ====
- Rune Factory Frontier, a direct sequel to the first game in the franchise, was released in Japan on November 27, 2008 for the Wii. The game features Raguna as he searches for Mist, who has abruptly left the town of Kardia. While searching, he stumbles across Trampoli village and learns that Whale Island, a floating sentient island above the village, is in danger of falling. Rune Factory Frontier features a new game mechanic known as runeys, elemental spirits native to Trampoli that are required to make "rune wonders" and affect the prosperity of your land. It was released in North America on March 17, 2009, and in Europe and Australia on April 1, 2010.
- Rune Factory: Tides of Destiny is a spin-off game, initially released in Japan on February 24, 2011 for the PlayStation 3 and Wii. It was published as Rune Factory Oceans in Japan and PAL regions. Aden and Sonja are two lifelong friends who live a tranquil life on Fenith Island until they are struck by a mysterious curse that forces both of their souls to be trapped in the same body. As they search for a way to undo the curse, Aden and Sonja befriend Ymir, a golem that enables them to journey across the ocean to the surrounding islands. The game was released in North America on October 7, 2011, in Europe on May 25, 2012, and in Australia on June 13, 2012. In PAL regions, the title was only released for the PlayStation 3.
- Rune Factory: Guardians of Azuma is a spin-off game that was released on June 5, 2025 for the PC, the Nintendo Switch, and the Nintendo Switch 2. The game takes place in the eastern nation of Azuma, which has been devastated by a calamity called the Celestial Collapse after a large object crashed into Azuma, causing runes to stop flowing and the six gods of nature to disappear. The player (either as Subaru or Kaguya), who has suffered from amnesia after waking up from a dream with two fighting dragons, must assume their role as an Earth Dancer to restore the four seasonal towns in Azuma and revive the gods while facing a threat called the Blight produced by a fearsome black dragon and a malevolent organization called the Tagesanbruch, all while searching for their missing childhood friend.

==== Future ====
- Rune Factory 6 is the upcoming sixth game of the main series. Not much is known about this game and there is no release date yet.

=== Related media ===
Several titles in the series have received their own manga adaptations. A 64-page manga was included as part of the pre-order for the first mainline game. An anthology manga series published by DNA Media Comics, was later released on November 1, 2006 to promote the game. It features an ensemble of writers, including Natsuna Morita, Hitoshi Tatsumi, Minato Tonami, Aimi Igarashi, Enya Uraki, and Hiromi Miura. Multiple manga titles based on Rune Factory 2 and Rune Factory Frontier have been serialized and featured in several magazines, including A-Station, Dengeki Maoh, Dengeki Nintendo DS, and Monthly Wings. Further manga adaptations have been serialized and published in Nintendo Dream magazine, coinciding with the Japanese releases of Rune Factory 3, Rune Factory 4 and Rune Factory 5.

== Common elements ==
=== Gameplay ===
The gameplay of the Rune Factory series is similar to that of Harvest Moon/Story of Seasons. For every one real-world second, one in-game minute passes. The player can grow crops, using upgradeable farm equipment. However, the Harvest Moon game mechanic of purchasing animals has been replaced by defeating and befriending monsters in dungeons. If a monster is tamed, it can help the player in battle, produce goods, or help to tend the crops. The game's combat is in the action role-playing game style.

Like most Harvest Moon/Story of Seasons games, the player is given a limited amount of stamina, in the form of "Rune Points", or "RP". Rune Points get depleted as the player performs tasks at the farm or fights using a weapon or skills. The player is given hit points as well. The player can attack with no RP by sacrificing HP. The player can replenish RP by using Runes created by fully-grown crops or potions, while HP can be restored using medicine or healing abilities. The town bathhouse restores both HP and RP. If the player runs out of HP while working on their farm, they will collapse and be rescued; however, in Rune Factory and Rune Factory 2, dying outside the town causes game over. In all other games, the player will not die while fighting in the caves or ruins.

Crops can be planted in different areas to sell for gold; other activities include mining for metal and minerals, fishing, or collecting food such as milk and eggs from befriended monsters. The player can then spend money and material to buy a variety of upgrades for their house, weapons, and tools.

In addition to their open-ended gameplay, the games possess a linear storyline, which can be furthered by exploring dungeons and defeating certain monsters. Just like in the Harvest Moon series, the main character's relationship with the other villagers increase by talking to them or performing actions that please them, like giving items they like as presents for example. Some of them can even be married if their relationship improves enough. Some games of the series require the protagonist to get married as part of the storyline.

== Development ==
It is described by Yoshifumi Hashimoto, producer of the Harvest Moon/Story of Seasons series, as "Harvest Moon where you wield a sword." According to Marvelous' managing director and Harvest Moon's creator, Yasuhiro Wada, Rune Factory 2 does not borrow the Harvest Moon(Bokujō Monogatari) name for the Japanese release. This was done in order to grow Rune Factory as an independent series and Marvelous will continue to do this with all future installments including Rune Factory Frontier. Despite this, Natsume Inc. applied the subtitle A Fantasy Harvest Moon to Rune Factory 2 and Rune Factory 3.

Rune Factory Frontier was announced during an interview between Cubed3 and Yasuhiro Wada on June 6, 2007, and was fully revealed on June 4, 2008 in the Japanese video game magazine Famitsu. On July 11, 2008, Marvelous Entertainment USA and Xseed Games announced that they were both bringing Rune Factory Frontier to North America. Rune Factory Frontier released in the North America region on March 17, 2009.

Rune Factory 5 was said to be expected at "some point in time", according to series producer Yoshifumi Hashimoto. In November 2013, Neverland Co. filed for bankruptcy, leaving the future of the series in question at the time. However, in February 2014 it was revealed that the Rune Factory development team had been hired by Marvelous AQL, and that they were developing the Nintendo 3DS simulation role-playing video game Lord of Magna: Maiden Heaven. In February 2019, during the 13.02.19 Nintendo Direct, Rune Factory 5 was once again confirmed to be in development by Hakama, a new studio founded by Hashimoto. In September 2020, during a Nintendo Direct Mini presentation the game's release date was slated for Spring 2021 in Japan and later in the same year worldwide. Another trailer was released in a Japanese-exclusive Nintendo Direct mini in October, revealing a limited edition "Premium Box" and an expected release date of May 20, 2021 in Japan.

== Reception ==
Sales and review scores As of September 2, 2023.
Game	Units sold	Famitsu	Metacritic
Rune Factory: A Fantasy Harvest Moon	110,828	33/40	78
Rune Factory 2	117,572		77
Rune Factory Frontier		29/40	79
Rune Factory 3	94,567	33/40	77
Rune Factory: Tides of Destiny	86,653	31/40	55
Rune Factory 4	453,567	34/40	78
Rune Factory 4 Special	185,432		83
Rune Factory 5	500,000		74
Rune Factory: Guardians of Azuma			81

The Rune Factory series has been well received, with the English region publisher Xseed Games declaring it as their best performing franchise in 2020.

Rune Factory: A Fantasy Harvest Moon received an 8.4 rating from IGN's Mark Bozon. Bozon commented that the art style was "amazing", and that it was "the Harvest Moon you've been waiting for". 7/10 from Nintendo Power, and 4/5 from X-Play.

IGN rated Rune Factory 2: A Fantasy Harvest Moon at 8.4/10, commenting on its similarity to the original.

Rune Factory 5 debuted at #1 in the Switch digital sales charts in Japan.

== See also ==
- Innocent Life: A Futuristic Harvest Moon – a 2006 video game, also released as a spin-off of the Story of Seasons franchise for its tenth anniversary.
- Lord of Magna: Maiden Heaven – a 2014 video game featuring key staff from Rune Factory.
- List of Sega video game franchises
