= Rune Factory 4 =

2012 video game

- North American 3DS cover art
- Developer: Neverland (Note: Rune Factory 4 Special developed by Hakama)
- Publishers: JP: Marvelous AQL; WW: Xseed Games
- Directors: Masahide Miyata; Shinichi Manabe
- Producer: Yoshifumi Hashimoto
- Artists: Minako Iwasaki; Takitaro; Masato Yamane; Oyaji
- Writer: Yoshifumi Hashimoto
- Composer: Tomoko Morita
- Series: Rune Factory
- Platforms: Nintendo 3DS; Nintendo Switch; Windows; PlayStation 4; Xbox One
- Release: Nintendo 3DS: JP: July 19, 2012; NA: October 1, 2013; PAL: December 11, 2014; Nintendo Switch: JP: July 25, 2019; NA: February 25, 2020; PAL: February 28, 2020; Windows, PS4, Xbox One: WW: December 7, 2021
- Genre: Role-playing game
- Mode: Single-player

Rune Factory 4 (Note: Japanese: ルーンファクトリー4, Hepburn: Rūn Fakutorī 4) is a 2012 role-playing simulation game developed by Neverland and published by Marvelous AQL. It is the sixth game in the Rune Factory series. It was released for the Nintendo 3DS in Japan in July 2012, in North America in October 2013, and in PAL regions in December 2014.

An enhanced version, Rune Factory 4 Special, (Note: Japanese: ルーンファクトリー４スペシャル, Hepburn: Rūn Fakutorī 4 Supesharu) was released for the Nintendo Switch in Japan in July 2019 and worldwide in February 2020. It was later released for the PlayStation 4, Xbox One, and Windows in 2021.

== Gameplay ==
Features common to previous games in the Rune Factory series, including farming, dungeon exploring, and marriage, return in Rune Factory 4.

Crafting is one of the main features in the series, with which all equipment used by the main character is created. From shoes to many types of weapons, crafting materials of various stats to form new equipment is the key to character progression - more so than the traditional leveling up feature that most RPGs rely on.

Rune Factory 4 adds the ability to make "Orders". As the prince or princess of Selphia, these Orders can range from requesting a town event (such as a harvest festival) to pushing back a storm from wiping out your crops.

== Story ==
The game begins by offering the player two lines of dialogue, with two options determining their gender. Their default names are Lest (if male) and Frey (if female). They are traveling by airship to the town of Selphia to meet and deliver a gift to its "God", but the airship is invaded by rogue soldiers and a fight ensues. During the fight, the player is hit in the head and it is later revealed that they developed amnesia, as has been the case with all previous Rune Factory video games. The player lands in the fictional town of Selphia, where they meet Ventuswill (Venti for short), one of the four Native Dragons, and is mistaken for a member of royalty who was supposed to be showing up soon to help run the town. Although this is quickly revealed not to be the case, the actual prince, named Arthur, is happy to let the player take over his job. Characters from Rune Factory 2 and 3, Barrett and Raven respectively, appear as cameos and can be recruited into a players party for dungeon exploration. The game has up to three story arcs.

In the first arc, the player helps Venti rescue four guardians, who have been tasked with collecting runes to maintain Venti's life force, but have become corrupted. For every guardian that is saved from their corruption, Venti slowly begins to die. After three have been rescued, the player searches for the Rune Spheres that they lost earlier so they can save the last guardian without killing Venti.

In the second arc, the player faces against the same soldiers from before, who reveal that they work for the Sechs Empire. After they steal the Rune Spheres, the player chases them down, fighting their forces and the dragons that they summon in the process. They soon confront Ethelbird, the Sechs Empire's leader, who merges with Venti and becomes more powerful. After defeating Ethelbird, he and Venti separate from each other and they are both pulled into the Forest of Beginnings. Ethelbird's defeat causes the Sechs Empire to collapse.

In the final arc, the player makes it their goal to find Venti and bring her back to Selphia.

== Characters ==
Rune Factory 4 features many characters residing in Selphia. If playing as the male protagonist, the player can choose to marry one of the following female characters:

- Clorica: An apprentice butler who is quick and competent at her work but often does so in her sleep.
- Margaret: The kind and hardworking elf who plays music at Porcoline's restaurant.
- Amber: An innocent girl with butterfly wings who loves sunny weather.
- Dolce: A girl who is frequently accompanied by the ghost, Pico. Her manner is blunt but she is genuinely kind.
- Xiao Pai: A hardworking and cheerful girl at the town inn. Her clumsiness leads to numerous mistakes.
- Forte: The serious and honest knight of Selphia. She's protective of her brother, Kiel.

If playing as the female protagonist, the player can choose to marry one of the following male characters:

- Vishnal: An apprentice butler training to become a full-fledged butler.
- Arthur: A prince from the capital. His passion for trade and negotiation leads to him working more than the average person.
- Dylas: A man with horse-like traits. His quiet and antisocial nature results in him being misunderstood.
- Doug: A hot-blooded dwarf who works at the general store. He has a large appetite.
- Kiel: An innocent young man who loves to read in the hopes his knowledge will benefit the townspeople.
- Leon: A mysterious man who enjoys teasing people but also keeps them at a distance.

Other characters that appear in the game consist of:

- Bado: A blacksmith dwarf.
- Blossom: Doug's adoptive grandmother, who also runs the general store alongside him.
- Illuminata: A detective girl who runs a flower shop.
- Jones: The town's doctor.
- Nancy: A nurse who works at Jones' clinic.
- Lin Fa: Xiao Pai's mother who owns the town inn.
- Porcoline: Margaret's adoptive father and a restaurant owner.
- Volkanon: A butler who works for Ventuswill.
- Pico: A ghost girl who accompanies Dolce. She deeply cares for her.
- Raven: A returning character from Rune Factory 3.
- Barrett: A returning character from Rune Factory 2.
- Eliza: A talking request box.
- Ventuswill: One of the four elder dragons of Norad and the protector of Selphia.
- Ethelberd: The evil ruler of the Sechs Empire who seeks to conquer the world. He previously appeared in Rune Factory: A Fantasy Harvest Moon.

== Development ==
Producer Yoshifumi Hashimoto said that the main theme is "passionate love, sweet marriage". This led him to greatly expand the types of dating events and their dramatic nature, and creating scenarios where players can go adventuring with their families. This was done to create a world that is not purely combat or farming driven, but gives players a choice. Another focus of development was to make farming, though repetitive by nature, a satisfying experience for a player. Drawing inspiration from games such as Pikmin, where Captain Olimar would pull Pikmin from the ground with a pop, and DokiDoki Panic, he decided to make the game's framerate run at 60 so that character responses to controller input would be felt immediately.

It was announced in January 2013 that Marvelous' US division Xseed Games would be localizing the game for North American audiences; they had previously localized Rune Factory Frontier for the Wii. On September 12, Xseed announced that the game would be released in North America on October 1, 2013. On the day of the North American release, MAQL Europe announced that they would release the game in Europe in Spring 2014. However, in January, the publisher announced that the European release would be cancelled, later revealing that the bankruptcy of Neverland was what led to the decision. In October 2014, Xseed had revealed that they were trying to find a way to release the game in Europe on the 3DS eShop. The game was officially released in Europe and Australia on December 11, 2014.

An enhanced version of the game for the Nintendo Switch, titled Rune Factory 4 Special, was released in Japan on July 25, 2019, in North America on February 25, 2020, and in Europe and Australia on February 28, 2020. This release features a new opening theme, another difficulty option, and uses Live2D technology for the additional Newlywed mode. This version of the game was also released for the PlayStation 4, Xbox One and Windows on December 7, 2021.

== Reception ==
Reception

Aggregate score
Aggregator	Score
Metacritic	3DS: 78/100; NS: 81/100; PC: 81/100; PS4: 74/100; XONE: 83/100

Review scores
Publication	Score
Destructoid	8/10
Famitsu	34/40
Game Informer	7/10
IGN	8/10

Japanese sales exceeded 150,000 copies, becoming the best selling game in the Rune Factory series, eclipsing Rune Factory 2, which had the top sales prior. Profits were well above expectation for game publisher Marvelous AQL. Due to the game's success, the game caused an upward revision of profits by 106.7% for the second financial quarter of 2012.
