= Rune Factory: Guardians of Azuma =

2025 video game

- Developer: Marvelous
- Publishers: WW: Marvelous; NA: Marvelous USA
- Director: Shiro Maekawa
- Producer: Hisashi Fujii
- Designers: Tsuneaki Kaneko; Yuki Nagamoto
- Programmer: Kenji Yatagai
- Artist: Tsuyoshi Azuma
- Writer: Shiro Maekawa
- Composer: Noriyuki Asakura
- Series: Rune Factory
- Platforms: Nintendo Switch; Nintendo Switch 2; Windows; PlayStation 5; Xbox Series X/S
- Release: Switch, Switch 2, Windows June 5, 2025; PS5, Xbox Series; February 13, 2026
- Genres: Role-playing, simulation
- Mode: Single-player

Rune Factory: Guardians of Azuma (Note: Japanese: 龍の国 ルーンファクトリー, Hepburn: Ryū no Kuni: Rūn Fakutorī; lit. 'Dragon Country: Rune Factory') is a 2025 role-playing simulation game developed and published by Marvelous. It is a spin-off of the Rune Factory series and released for Nintendo Switch, Nintendo Switch 2, and Windows on June 5, 2025. The game received generally positive reviews from critics.

== Gameplay ==
Guardians of Azuma blends elements of farming simulation and action role-playing games. The player can engage in activities such as cultivating crops, battling monsters, and developing relationships with non-player characters. Certain areas are customizable, allowing the player to place farmland, buildings, and decorative items. The player can choose to manually farm crops or to assign tasks to villagers. Many activities earn experience points that can be spent in skill trees, and items like Sacred Treasures have beneficial effects in both combat and daily life. The game features expanded social interactions, allowing the player character to recruit characters to join their party in combat. Several characters are available as romance options regardless of the player character's gender.

== Plot ==
=== Setting ===
The game is set in the fantasy region of Azuma, a mountainous territory inspired by traditional Japanese aesthetics. Azuma is divided into seasonal zones, each with its own unique environment and festivals.

The story centers around a protagonist who is tasked with restoring Azuma's gods, following a calamity known as the Celestial Collapse, when an unknown object fell from the sky and disrupted the land's magical runes. Throughout Azuma, a black dragon has spread Blight that the protagonist must purify.

=== Story ===
At the beginning of the game, the player chooses between a male or female protagonist, and the character they did not select becomes the black dragon's rider.

After a confrontation with the black dragon, the protagonist crash-lands in Spring Village, and lives there after losing their memory. One day, the spring god Ulalaka tells the protagonist that they are an Earth Dancer. (Note: "Earth Dancer" is an alternative name for an "Earthmate" in the Rune Factory games.) The protagonist then meets Woolby, a descendant of the legendary dragon Mihoshi Habaki. After the protagonist helps restore Ulalaka's powers, they repair a shrine, allowing Woolby to regain his true form as Mokoshiro, the White Dragon. At Ulalaka's request, the protagonist travels to revive the other three villages' gods.

In Summer Village, the protagonist locates and repairs the sword housing the summer god to revive her. In Autumn Village, the protagonist helps arrange a fighting festival against the autumn god's wishes, angering him but reviving him nonetheless. In Winter Village, the protagonist returns the wolf-like winter god, Fubuki, to his human form and prevents a mysterious woman named Clarice from killing him.

With four gods revived, Ulalaka asks the protagonist to remove a barrier around the Epicenter, the area where the Celestial Collapse occurred. There, the protagonist encounters the black dragon and recognizes its rider as the other protagonist. Later, the protagonist recalls that the other protagonist was their childhood friend, and they were both instructed to offer amulets at Astral Shrines to save Azuma. The protagonist visits the Astral Shrines, and remembers at the final shrine that they had formed a pact with Mokoshiro, with the protagonist sacrificing their memories to become an Earth Dancer and save Azuma.

The protagonist deduces that their childhood friend formed a pact with the black dragon, and the pact means that killing the black dragon will kill their friend. Kai, god of the Underworld, helps the protagonist travel there to research the black dragon. They learn that the black dragon was given the power to use Mihoshi Habaki's body and heart to destroy and recreate Azuma, while Mokoshiro is meant to guard Mihoshi Habaki's heart. Wanting to defeat the black dragon without harming their friend, the protagonist travels to meet Kanata, god of the Heavenly Realm. However, Kanata has gone into a depression. The protagonist and the gods throw a party for Kanata, and she explains that she had allowed Mihoshi Habaki's heart to fall from the Heavenly Realm, causing the Celestial Collapse to revitalize Azuma.

The gods remove the second barrier around the Epicenter, allowing the protagonist to defeat the black dragon, and Kai and Kanata to sever their friend's pact. However, Clarice attacks the gods and mortally wounds the protagonist's friend. The protagonist has the option to save their friend by sacrificing their own relationships, experience, or wealth to the black dragon. If they choose not to, their friend perishes.

The gods reinstate the barrier, and task the protagonist with activating Holy Shrines across Azuma to maintain it. The protagonist fights Clarice and her allies along the way, and eventually learns that Clarice is the leader of the Tagesanbruch, an organization that aims to kill Azuma's gods and conquer the region. The protagonist infiltrates the Tagesanbruch's base, and learns from Clarice and others that the Tagesanbruch emerged from the fallen Sechs Empire, (Note: The Sechs Empire are the antagonists of previous Rune Factory titles.) and Clarice's family was murdered by Kamurosaki, Fubuki's twin brother and an evil god who is influencing her through a curse.

Once the Holy Shrines are activated, the protagonist helps Kai subdue a revolt in the Underworld, revealed to be a distraction to allow the Tagesanbruch to obtain the tomb housing Mihoshi Habaki's body. Clarice escapes with the tomb, revealed to be an aerial fortress, and the protagonist pursues her to the Epicenter. The protagonist defeats Kamurosaki and kills him with Fubuki's help. Clarice summons Mihoshi Habaki to destroy Azuma and recreate it as the new Sechs Empire under her rule, but the protagonist manages to defeat Clarice and free her from Kamurosaki's curse, making her see the error of her ways. The protagonist's allies help them defeat Mihoshi Habaki and send him back to the Heavenly Realm, preventing Azuma's destruction. Afterwards, the group celebrates in Spring Village, with a reformed Clarice deciding to stay in Azuma.

== Development ==
Development of the game began in September 2021, following the release of Rune Factory 5. Rune Factory: Guardians of Azuma was officially announced during the Marvelous Games Showcase in May 2023, initially under the codename “Project Dragon.” It was originally meant to be released on May 30, 2025, but was delayed to June 5, 2025.

== Reception ==
Reception

Aggregate scores
Aggregator	Score
Metacritic	NS: 81/100; NS2: 82/100; PC: 80/100; PS5: 85/100
OpenCritic	83% recommend

Review scores
Publication	Score
HobbyConsolas	73/100
Nintendo Life	9/10
Nintendo World Report	8.5/10
RPGFan	94/100

Rune Factory: Guardians of Azuma received generally favorable reviews. Critics praised the game's blend of farming simulation and action RPG elements, as well as its engaging story and character development. Nintendo Life awarded the game a 9 out of 10, stating that it "manages to reinvent itself while still maintaining the bones that make the Rune Factory series feel like itself." RPG Fan gave it a 94 out of 100, calling it "the best series entry yet."

However, some reviewers noted shortcomings. RPG Site rated the game 6 out of 10, citing "boring dungeons and weak RPG progression tools" despite a "fun cast of characters and decent story." TechRaptor also gave it a 6 out of 10, mentioning that "despite character events being the best they've ever been, [the game] fails to offer much depth after its opening hours."
