= Natsume Inc. =

American video game company

- Type: Private
- Industry: Video game
- Founded: May 1988; 38 years ago
- Headquarters: Burlingame, California, United States
- Key people: Hiro Maekawa (president); Taka Maekawa (president, Natsume Inc Japan)
- Products: Harvest Moon; Reel Fishing; River King
- Website: www.natsume.com

Natsume Inc. is an American video game publisher. Originally established as an American division of Natsume Co., Ltd. in 1988, it split from its parent company in 1995 to become an independent publisher.

Natsume Inc. is located in Burlingame, California. It is best known for publishing unique, family-oriented niche games, such as Harvest Moon and Reel Fishing. In 2013, Natsume Inc. inaugurated a Japanese division called Natsume Inc. Japan with no connection to its former parent company, Natsume Atari.

== History ==
Natsume Inc. was originally established as an American division of Natsume Co., Ltd. in San Francisco, California in May 1988.

From the end of the Super NES era up until late 2014, Natsume Inc. was known for publishing the Story of Seasons games in North America under the title of Harvest Moon. The last game in the series it published was Harvest Moon: A New Beginning for the Nintendo 3DS. In 2015, the developer of the series, Marvelous, brought the next game in the series, Story of Seasons, to North America with its own US branch, Xseed Games, ending the relationship it had with Natsume. Since then, Natsume Inc. has released its own games under the Harvest Moon name, starting with Harvest Moon: The Lost Valley, continuing with Harvest Moon: Seeds of Memories and Harvest Moon: Skytree Village. In 2013, Natsume Inc. opened up a development studio of its own, named Natsume Inc. Japan.

Natsume Inc. has also operated an eBay shop, selling copies of older games sealed in their original packaging, collected from storage at its offices. At auction, the company sold a sealed copy of Pocky & Rocky for over $1,600.

== Works ==
These are games published by Natsume Inc. and/or developed by its subsidiary in Japan after becoming independent from Natsume Co., Ltd.

Most of these games were only published by Natsume in North America, although some reached Europe under the Natsume name through distribution deals with European companies, and some digital releases were self-published by Natsume in Europe.

Year	Title	Developer	Platforms(s)	Ref.
1995	Lufia II: Rise of the Sinistrals	Neverland	Super NES	
1996	Casper	Bonsai Entertainment	Game Boy	
1996	Casper	Imagineering	Super NES	
1996	Harvest Moon	Amccus	Super NES	
1996	Highway 2000	Genki	Sega Saturn	
1996	Virtual Casino	Digital Factory	Sega Saturn	
1996	Reel Fishing	Victor Interactive Software	PlayStation	
1997	Harvest Moon GB	Victor Interactive Software	Game Boy	
1997	Legend of the River King	Victor Interactive Software	Game Boy	
1998	Lode Runner	Presage Software	PlayStation	
1998	Puzzle Bobble 4	Taito	PlayStation	
1999	Harvest Moon 64	Victor Interactive Software	Nintendo 64	
1999	Harvest Moon 2 GBC	Victor Interactive Software	Game Boy Color	
1999	Harvest Moon: Back to Nature	Victor Interactive Software	PlayStation	
1999	Hole in One Golf	Natsume Co., Ltd.	Game Boy Color	
1999	Legend of the River King	Victor Interactive Software	Game Boy Color	
1999	Legend of the River King 2	Tose	Game Boy Color	
2000	Harvest Moon 3 GBC	Victor Interactive Software	Game Boy Color	
2000	Reel Fishing II	Victor Interactive Software	PlayStation	
2000	Turnabout	Artdink	PlayStation	
2001	BursTrick: Wake Boarding!!	Metro Corporation	PlayStation	
2001	Car Battler Joe	Ancient	Game Boy Advance	
2001	Metropolismania	Indi	PlayStation 2	
2001	Harvest Moon: Save the Homeland	Victor Interactive Software	PlayStation 2	
2001	Lufia: The Legend Returns	Neveland/Natsume Co., Ltd.	Game Boy Color	
2001	Pocky & Rocky with Becky	Altron	Game Boy Advance	
2001	Skydiving Extreme	Metro Corporation	PlayStation	
2002	Chulip	Punchline	PlayStation 2	
2002	Gekioh Shooting King	Warashi	PlayStation	
2002	Medabots	Natsume Co., Ltd.	Game Boy Advance	
2002	Medabots AX: Metabee/Rokusho Version	Natsume Co., Ltd.	Game Boy Advance	
2003	Blockids	Athena	PlayStation	
2003	CIMA: The Enemy	Neverland	Game Boy Advance	
2003	Harvest Moon: A Wonderful Life	Marvelous Entertainment	PlayStation 2, GameCube	
2003	Harvest Moon: Friends of Mineral Town	Marvelous Entertainment	Game Boy Advance	
2003	Harvest Moon: More Friends of Mineral Town	Marvelous Entertainment	Game Boy Advance	
2003	Medabots Infinity	Natsume Co., Ltd.	GameCube	
2003	Reel Fishing III	Victor Interactive Software	PlayStation 2	
2004	Finny the Fish & the Seven Waters	SCEI	PlayStation 2	
2005	Harvest Moon: Another Wonderful Life	Marvelous Entertainment	GameCube	
2005	Harvest Moon DS	Marvelous Entertainment	Nintendo DS	
2005	Harvest Moon DS Cute	Marvelous Entertainment	Nintendo DS	
2005	Harvest Moon: Magical Melody	Marvelous Entertainment	GameCube	
2005	Harvest Moon: Back to Nature	Victor Interactive Software	PlayStation Portable	
2005	Reel Fishing: The Great Outdoors	Natsume Inc.	PlayStation Portable	
2005	River King: A Wonderful Journey	Marvelous Entertainment	PlayStation 2	
2006	Ruff Trigger: The Vanocore Conspiracy	Playstos Entertainment	PlayStation 2	
2006	Rune Factory: A Fantasy Harvest Moon	Neverland	Nintendo DS	
2006	Freedom Wings	Taito	Nintendo DS	
2006	Innocent Life: A Futuristic Harvest Moon	ArtePiazza	PlayStation 2, PlayStation Portable	
2006	Metropolismania 2	Indi	PlayStation 2	
2006	Captain Tsubasa	Namco Bandai Games	PlayStation 2	
2007	Hi Hamtaro! Little Hamsters Big Adventure	AlphaDream/Marvelous Entertainment	Nintendo DS	
2007	Harvest Moon DS: Island of Happiness	Marvelous Entertainment	Nintendo DS	
2007	Harvest Moon: Tree of Tranquility	Marvelous Entertainment	Wii	
2007	River King: Mystic Valley	Marvelous Entertainment	Nintendo DS	
2007	Puzzle de Harvest Moon	Platinum-Egg Inc.	Nintendo DS	
2008	Adventures to Go	Global A Entertainment	PlayStation Portable	
2008	Afrika	Rhino Studios	PlayStation 3	
2008	Harvest Moon DS: Grand Bazaar	Marvelous Entertainment	Nintendo DS	
2008	Harvest Moon DS: Sunshine Islands	Marvelous Entertainment	Nintendo DS	
2008	Harvest Moon: Animal Parade	Marvelous Entertainment	Wii	
2008	Princess Debut	Cave	Nintendo DS	
2008	Rune Factory 2: A Fantasy Harvest Moon	Neverland	Nintendo DS	
2008	Rune Factory Frontier	Neverland	Wii	
2009	Harvest Moon: Frantic Farming	Platinum-Egg	Nintendo DS, iOS	
2009	Rune Factory 3: A Fantasy Harvest Moon	Neverland	Nintendo DS	
2009	Reel Fishing Angler's Dream	SIMS	Wii	
2009	Reel Fishing Challenge	SIMS	Wii	
2009	Harvest Moon: My Little Shop	h.a.n.d.	Wii	
2009	Moki Moki	Natsume Co., Ltd.	Wii	
2009	Animal Kingdom: Wildlife Expedition	Natsume Co., Ltd.	Wii	
2010	Cheer we Go	Natsume Co., Ltd.	Nintendo DS, iOS	
2010	Harvest Moon: Hero of Leaf Valley	Marvelous Entertainment	PlayStation Portable	
2010	Harvest Moon: The Tale of Two Towns	Marvelous Entertainment	Nintendo DS	
2010	Lufia: Curse of the Sinistrals	Neverland/Square Enix	Nintendo DS	
2010	Reel Fishing Challenge II	Natsume Inc.	Wii	
2010	Witch's Wish	Yuke's	Nintendo DS	
2011	Rune Factory: Tides of Destiny	Neverland	PlayStation 3	
2011	Reel Fishing Paradise 3D	Natsume	Nintendo 3DS	
2011	Harvest Moon: The Tale of Two Towns	Marvelous Entertainment	Nintendo 3DS	
2011	Gabrielle's Ghostly Groove 3D	Natsume	Nintendo 3DS	
2012	Gabrielle's Monster Match	Santa Entertainment	iOS	
2012	Harvest Moon 3D: A New Beginning	Marvelous AQL	Nintendo 3DS	
2012	Mystic Chronicles	Kemco	PlayStation Portable	
2013	Carnage Heart EXA	Artdink	PlayStation Portable	
2013	Reel Fishing Pocket	Natsume Co., Ltd.	iOS	
2013	Gabrielle's Zombie Attack	Natsume Inc.	iOS	
2013	Yumi's Odd Odyssey	Studio Sainenzen	Nintendo 3DS	
2013	Hometown Story	Hyde Inc/Toybox Inc	Nintendo 3DS, iOS	
2014	Gabrielle's Sweet Defense	Nikukyu Co Ltd	iOS	
2014	Gabrielle's Monstrous Duel	Natsume Inc.	iOS	
2014	Harvest Moon: The Lost Valley	Tabot Inc., Natsume Inc.	Nintendo 3DS, Nintendo Switch	
2014	Hometown Story Pocket	Natsume Inc.	iOS	
2014	Gotcha Racing	Arc System Works	Nintendo 3DS	
2015	Brave Tank Hero	Arc System Works	Nintendo 3DS, Wii U	
2016	Harvest Moon: Seeds of Memories	Natsume Inc.	iOS	
2016	Harvest Moon: Skytree Village	Tabot, AJP Games, Natsume Inc.	Nintendo 3DS, Nintendo Switch	
2016	River City: Rival Showdown	Arc System Works, Aplus	Nintendo 3DS	
2016	Super Strike Beach Volleyball	Arc System Works	Nintendo 3DS	
2016	Wild Guns Reloaded	Natsume Atari	Nintendo Switch, PlayStation 4, Windows	
2017	Harvest Moon: Light of Hope	Tabot, Inc.	Nintendo Switch, PlayStation 4, Windows, Android, iOS, Xbox One	
2017	River City: Knights of Justice	Avit-Niigata	Nintendo 3DS	
2019	Ninja Climb	Lit A.F. Games	iOS	
2019	Reel Fishing: Road Trip Adventure	Natsume Inc., Tachyon	Nintendo Switch, PlayStation 4, Windows	
2019	Harvest Moon: Mad Dash	Appci	PlayStation 4, Nintendo Switch, Windows, Xbox One	
2020	Cosmic Defenders	Fiery Squirrel	Nintendo Switch	
2020	Legends of Ethernal	Lucid Dreams Studio	Nintendo Switch, PlayStation 4, Windows, Xbox One	
2021	ConnecTank	Yummy Yummy Tummy, Tamatin Entertainment	Nintendo Switch, PlayStation 4, Windows, Xbox One, Xbox Series X/S	
2021	Harvest Moon: One World	Appci, Natsume Inc.	Nintendo Switch, PlayStation 4, Windows, Xbox One	
2022	Pocky & Rocky Reshrined	Natsume Atari	Nintendo Switch, PlayStation 4, Windows, Xbox Series X/S	
2023	Harvest Moon: The Winds of Anthos	Appci, Natsume Inc.	Nintendo Switch, PlayStation 4, PlayStation 5, Windows, Xbox One, Xbox Series X/S	
2024	Harvest Moon: Home Sweet Home	Natsume Inc.	Android, iOS, Nintendo Switch, PlayStation 5, Windows, Xbox Series X/S	
2024	Reel Fishing: Days of Summer	Natsume Inc.	Nintendo Switch, PlayStation 4, PlayStation 5, Windows, Xbox Series X/S	
2025	Harvest Moon: Cozy Bundle	Natsume Inc.	Nintendo Switch	
2026	Harvest Moon: Echoes of Teradea	Imagica Geeq	Nintendo Switch, Nintendo Switch 2, PlayStation 5, Windows, Xbox Series X/S	
