= Lord of Magna: Maiden Heaven =

2014 video game

- Developer: Marvelous
- Publisher: Marvelous: NA: Xseed Games
- Director: Masahide Miyata
- Producer: Yoshifumi Hashimoto
- Composer: Tomoko Morita
- Platform: Nintendo 3DS
- Release: JP: October 2, 2014; NA: June 2, 2015; PAL: June 4, 2015
- Genre: Role-playing
- Mode: Single-player

Lord of Magna: Maiden Heaven (Note: Known in Japan as Forbidden Magna (禁忌のマグナ, Kinki no Maguna)) is a simulation role-playing video game developed by Marvelous for the Nintendo 3DS. It was released in Japan in October 2014 before an international release in June 2015.

== Gameplay ==
Lord of Magna features turn-based battles, with character order based on individual speed. The parties are assembled within a deck and controls in battle have been compared to those of an action game. The special attacks of the characters are unlocked based on their trust in Luchs, the game's protagonist, and by defeating enemies more special moves can be used.

== Story ==
Lord of Magna is set on Étoile Isle, where Luchs, the protagonist, is in charge of the Famille Inn. Despite the inn's lack of customers, the protagonist keeps the hotel clean and fulfills the family motto. One day, on a fateful trip to the crystal-filled caves, he digs up more than usual, uncovering both a horde of angry monsters and a powerful, pink-haired, amnesic girl named Charlotte, who quickly saves his life. Things ramp up very quickly from there as Luchs sets out on an adventure with Charlotte, his childhood friend Amelia, and his best friend Bart. An adventure filled with magic, monsters and many, many maidens such as Charlotte's six sisters each with very different personalities and their own individual charms. The sisters form the basis of the battle party, housekeeping staff, and dating-sim component of the adventure. The endings vary based on the sister Luchs spend the most time with and grow closest to.

== Development ==
The game was first announced in February 2014, and was about half complete at the time of its reveal. The development of the game began internally at Neverland before the closure of the studio. The game development team contains staff from Neverland, the development company responsible for the Rune Factory series of games. After the release of Rune Factory 4, Neverland had filed for bankruptcy and closed. Despite this, publisher Marvelous retained some key staff in order to finish work on the game. Key staff retained includes producer Yoshifumi Hashimoto, director Masahide Miyata, and composer Tomoko Morita. The game's graphics uses a similar style to that of the Story of Seasons and Rune Factory iterations found on the Nintendo 3DS.

The game was released in Japan on October 2, 2014, in North America on June 2, 2015, and in Europe and Australia on June 4, 2015.

== Reception ==
Reception

Aggregate score
Aggregator	Score
Metacritic	68/100

Review scores
Publication	Score
Destructoid	7/10
Hardcore Gamer	3.5/5

Lord of Magna: Maiden Heaven holds a rating of 68/100 on review aggregate site Metacritic, indicating "mixed or average reviews".

Chris Carter from Destructoid rated the game a 7/10 saying, "I enjoyed my time with Lord of Magna: Maiden Heaven, despite the fact that it felt a tad unfinished at times" Bradly Storm of Hardcore Gamer gave the game a 3.5 out of 5 saying "Those looking for a unique take on the genre or are wanting an engaging tactical combat system might find Lord of Magna worth the investment."
