= Minako Iwasaki =

Japanese illustrator and manga artist

Minako Iwasaki (岩崎美奈子, Iwasaki Minako, born March 10 in Niigata, Japan) is a Japanese illustrator and manga artist. She joined the game company Nihon Falcom in 1993. After she turned freelance, she took on illustrations of light novels and character designs for the Rune Factory series.

== Main works ==
=== Character design ===
- The Legend of Heroes III: Song of the Ocean (PC-98, Nihon Falcom)
- Brandish 3: Spirit of Balcan (PC-98, Nihon Falcom)
- Revival Xanadu (PC-98, Nihon Falcom)
- The Legend of Xanadu II (PC Engine, Nihon Falcom)
- Ys V: Lost Kefin, Kingdom of Sand (Super Famicom, Nihon Falcom)
- The Legend of Heroes: A Tear of Vermillion (PC-98, Nihon Falcom)
- Ys Eternal (Windows, Nihon Falcom)
- The Legend of Heroes: A Tear of Vermillion (PSP, Nihon Falcom)
- Rune Factory: A Fantasy Harvest Moon (Nintendo DS, Marvelous Interactive)
- The Legend of Heroes II: Prophecy of the Moonlight Witch (PSP, Nihon Falcom)
- Rune Factory 2 (Nintendo DS, Marvelous Interactive)
- Rune Factory Frontier (Nintendo Wii, Marvelous Interactive)
- Rune Factory 3 (Nintendo DS, Marvelous Interactive)
- Rune Factory: Tides of Destiny (Nintendo Wii/PS3, Marvelous Interactive)
- Rune Factory 4 (Nintendo 3DS, Marvelous Interactive)
- L2 Love x Loop (PS2, Otomate/Idea Factory)
- Rune Factory 5 (Nintendo Switch, Marvelous Interactive)
- Rear Sekai (Nintendo Switch, Bushiroad Games)

=== Illustration ===
- Sora no Kane no Hibiku Hoshi de series
- Kamen Rider Hibiki (novel version)

=== Manga ===
- Hariduki Kagerou Enishie Monogatari (ISBN 4758052603)

=== Artbook ===
- Minako Iwasaki ARTWORKS (July 1, 2006, ISBN 4-7973-3321-9)
