= Rune Factory: Tides of Destiny =

2011 video game

- North American cover art
- Developer: Neverland
- Publishers: JP: Marvelous Entertainment; NA: Natsume Inc.; EU: Rising Star Games
- Directors: Masahide Miyata; Kenichi Yanagihara
- Producer: Yoshifumi Hashimoto
- Artist: Minako Iwasaki
- Composer: Tomoko Morita
- Series: Rune Factory
- Platforms: PlayStation 3, Wii
- Release: JP: February 24, 2011; NA: October 7, 2011; EU: May 25, 2012 (PS3); AU: June 13, 2012 (PS3)
- Genres: Simulation, action role-playing
- Mode: Single-player

Rune Factory: Tides of Destiny, known in Japan and PAL regions as Rune Factory: Oceans, is a 2011 role-playing simulation game developed by Neverland. It was released for the Wii and PlayStation 3 and published by Marvelous Entertainment in Japan, Natsume Inc. in North America, and Rising Star Games in Europe and Australia. It is a spin-off in the Rune Factory series. Players control a male and female character in one, the male side named Aden and the female side named Sonja, as they traverse the seas on a giant beast named Ymir. The beast can raise sunken islands and ships from the sea. Players are able to farm, fight using a real-time battle system, and form relationships.

== Characters ==
The two main characters are Aden and Sonja, and the player will be encountering many people such as Lily, Odette, Violet, Bismark, James, Joe and many more. Every character has personalities and stories to them, the more the player gets closer to a character the more they learn about them. The player becomes closer to a character by raising their friendship levels, they can do so by giving them items that they like, talking to them every day and fulfilling quests for them from the Bulletin board. Raising friendship levels is a key requirement in completing parts of the game's story.

== Plot ==
Childhood friends Aden and Sonja (their names can be changed) are pulled into a portal that transports them to what appears to be an alternate version of their homeland: Fenith Island. They discover that Sonja has lost her body and her soul has merged with Aden's body. They meet a girl named Odette, who owns an inn alongside her sisters Lily and Violet, and provides them with a home. At one point, they find a strange seed that grows into a Plant Golem, who obeys whoever plants it. They name the golem Ymir (the player can also change this name). While exploring nearby islands, they encounter goblin pirates and a mysterious masked man, who destroys four orbs and summons dark spirits in his tracks. The man is plotting to awaken a dangerous deity called the Legendary Golem and use it to conquer the world, and that the orbs were keeping the Legendary Golem locked away. The destruction of the orbs create a magical platform where the Legendary Golem resides. The man later takes control of Lily using his Awareness Control ability, revealing that she and her sisters are Dragon Priestesses, and has her sing the Spirits' Song, but his efforts are countered by a mysterious entity who is controlling Odette's body. After defeating the man's dark spirits, he realizes that Lily's voice isn't powerful enough and is forced to retreat, leaving Lily behind; his absence frees Lily from his control. The entity is revealed to be an unborn Arch-Dragon whose egg was laid on the top of the island earlier. To stop the Legendary Golem, they perform a ritual to summon a Wind Priestess from the past with the help of arch-sorceress Pandora, but a disruption results in the priestess landing in another point in time. As an alternative, the duo help the Arch-Dragon hatch from its egg. After having Odette and her sisters sing the Spirits' Song at three alters found on the nearby islands, the Arch-Dragon carries them and Ymir to the magical platform, where they fight the Legendary Golem, eventually defeating it at the cost of Ymir's life. They confront the masked man, who removes his disguise, revealing Sonja's body. It turns out Sonja was the Wind Priestess that the group tried to summon earlier and that Aden and Sonja are not in another dimension, but 200 years in the future. The man disrupted the ritual so he can take over Sonja's body with the intention of becoming the new Legendary Golem. Aden is overwhelmed, but Sonja, the pirate goblins, and the game's bachelors and bachelorettes come to his aid, allowing him to defeat the man, whose soul dies, leaving Sonja's body lifeless. The magical platform collapses, but the spirits save Aden and Sonja. Aden then makes it his goal to restore Sonja to her body by befriending the townsfolks. They also restore Ymir at one point. Before performing the ritual, the player must choose whether to keep playing as Aden or switch to Sonja, as the character that the player chose will be the only one who can control Ymir. Once Sonja is back in her body, the character that the player did not choose will move to the inn. The Arch-Dragon then has Sonja and Aden perform one final ritual to keep the Legendary Golem sealed away for good. It then offers to send them back to their time, but they decline, deciding to live in this time instead. The player can now do as they wish, including marrying one of the bachelors or bachelorettes and having children.

== Reception ==
Reception

Aggregate score
Aggregator	Score	
Aggregator	PS3	Wii
Metacritic	55/100	78/100

Review scores
Publication	Score	
Publication	PS3	Wii
Famitsu	31/40	31/40
GameSpot	6.5/10	N/A
GamesRadar+	2/5	N/A
GameZone	N/A	4/10
IGN	5.5/10	5.5/10
Nintendo Power	N/A	8/10
Nintendo World Report	N/A	7.5/10
PlayStation Official Magazine – UK	5/10	N/A
Play	51%	N/A
PlayStation: The Official Magazine	5/10	N/A
The Digital Fix	5/10	N/A

The Wii version received "generally favorable reviews", while the PlayStation 3 version received "mixed" reviews, according to the review aggregation website Metacritic. Nintendo Power praised the Wii version, noting its graphics, voice acting, and "compelling" plot. In Japan, Famitsu gave the game a score of three eights and one seven for a total of 31 out of 40.
