= Fashion Dreamer =

2023 dress-up simulation video game

- Developer: syn Sophia
- Publishers: JP: Marvelous; NA: Xseed Games; EU: Marvelous Europe
- Directors: Tetsuro Takita; Noriyoshi Shimazaki; Masashi Ogawa
- Producer: Syuji Yoshida
- Platform: Nintendo Switch
- Release: JP: 2 November 2023; WW: 3 November 2023
- Genres: Dress-up; Simulation
- Mode: Single-player

Fashion Dreamer is a 2023 dress-up simulation video game developed by Japanese studio syn Sophia and published by Marvelous for the Nintendo Switch. Set in a virtual world called Eve, the game allows players to create outfits for other characters, design clothing for their own fashion brand and gain followers. It was released in Japan on 2 November 2023 and internationally the following day.

Developed by the studio behind the Style Savvy series, Fashion Dreamer places greater emphasis on clothing customisation and social interactions than on shop management. It received mixed reviews, with critics praising its dress-up options but criticising its repetitive gameplay and lack of structured progression. The game sold nearly 500,000 copies worldwide by the end of 2023. Its online mode was discontinued in March 2026.

== Gameplay ==
The player creates an avatar, called a Muse, and explores Eve, a virtual world divided into four areas known as Cocoons. Each Cocoon has its own appearance and clothing styles, and additional areas become available as the player's Influencer Rank increases.

The player encounters computer-controlled characters called Character Muses and creates outfits for them, known as "Lookits", using clothing from their collection. Characters have preferences for particular colours, garments and styles, while changing fashion trends provide additional criteria for designing outfits. Completed Lookits are evaluated according to how well they meet these requirements. Creating outfits earns rewards, increases a Character Muse's affinity with the player and contributes to the player's follower count.

Clothing worn by other Muses can be added to the player's collection by giving individual items a "Like". The Item Creator allows players to design clothing and accessories by customising unlocked patterns with different colours. These items form the player's fashion brand and can be displayed in a customisable showroom. Players can also change their Muse's appearance and clothing, take photographs and create up to four Muses on a single save file.

The game originally included an online mode in which Muses belonging to other players appeared in Eve. Players could create Lookits for one another, exchange requests, follow other Muses, visit their showrooms and collect clothing designed by other players. The online mode was discontinued in March 2026, but the solo mode remains playable.

== Development and release ==
Fashion Dreamer was developed by Japanese studio syn Sophia, which had previously created the Style Savvy series for Nintendo handheld consoles. Although both games concern fashion and clothing design, Fashion Dreamer is a separate title with different gameplay systems. Unlike Style Savvy, which focuses on managing a clothing boutique, Fashion Dreamer centres on dressing characters, creating clothing and gaining followers in a virtual world.

The game was announced during a Nintendo Direct presentation in February 2023. During the Marvelous Game Showcase in May, syn Sophia president and producer Syuji Yoshida discussed the game's social features, including the ability to interact with other players and share clothing designs. Fashion Dreamer was released in Japan on 2 November 2023, followed by North America, Europe and other regions on 3 November.

Marvelous released twelve free updates after launch, adding clothing, limited-time events and features such as a Lookbook for saving outfits and a Muse Notebook for recording interactions with characters.

Support for the online mode ended at 02:00 UTC on 17 March 2026. Marvelous stated that the solo mode would remain playable and provided adjustments for offline play.

== Reception ==
Reception

Aggregate scores
Aggregator	Score
Metacritic	62/100
OpenCritic	35%

Review scores
Publication	Score
Nintendo Life	5/10
Nintendo World Report	5.5/10

Fashion Dreamer received "mixed or average" reviews according to review aggregator Metacritic, which reported a score of 62 out of 100 based on 23 critic reviews. OpenCritic reported that 35% of critics recommended the game.

Jess Elizabeth Reed of Nintendo Life gave the game 5 out of 10. She enjoyed creating outfits and experimenting with clothing combinations, as well as some of the online interactions. However, she criticised the lack of clear goals, the limited progression and the number of different currencies used in the game's economy. Reed also found that the showroom offered little beyond displaying clothing and furniture.

Allyson Cygan of Nintendo World Report gave it 5.5 out of 10. She praised the customisation options and the ability to exchange outfits with other players, but found the gameplay repetitive and lacking in challenge. Like Reed, she considered the game less substantial than the earlier Style Savvy titles.

Jenni Lada of Siliconera praised the variety of dress-up options but found the environments sparsely populated and the clothing-design system limited. She also criticised the absence of the boutique-management mechanics found in Style Savvy, the lack of meaningful feedback when completing outfits and the repetitive process of earning currency to unlock new items.

Dashiell Wood of TechRadar praised the clothing selection, character models and online features. He found the single-player progression poorly structured, however, and criticised the limited range of body types available for Muses, particularly the absence of larger body shapes and the restrictions on clothing imposed by the two avatar body types.

Daz Skubich of Pocket Tactics gave the game 8 out of 10. They praised its clothing customisation, character designs and online interactions, particularly the ability to collect and wear clothing created by other players. Skubich also criticised the lack of larger body types and the restrictions on sharing clothing between different avatar types, but did not consider the absence of a conventional story mode a drawback.

=== Sales ===
By the end of December 2023, Fashion Dreamer had sold nearly 500,000 copies worldwide, including digital sales. More than 60% of sales were outside Japan. Marvelous reported that the game had fallen short of its original sales forecast, although the company considered its performance encouraging for a new title.
