= Brave Tank Hero =

2014 video game

- Developer: Arc System Works
- Publishers: Arc System Works^{JP} Natsume Inc.^{WW}
- Platforms: Nintendo 3DS, Wii U
- Release: Nintendo 3DS: JP: April 2, 2014; WW: August 11, 2015; Wii U: JP: July 30, 2014; NA: August 27, 2015; PAL: September 24, 2015
- Genre: Action
- Modes: Single-player, multiplayer

Brave Tank Hero is a tank action video game for the Nintendo 3DS and Wii U developed by Arc System Works and published by Arc System Works in Japan, and Natsume Inc. worldwide. The game was first released for the Nintendo 3DS on April 2, 2014 in Japan, and on August 11, 2015 worldwide. A Wii U release followed on July 30, 2014 in Japan, and on August 27, 2015 in North America, and then PAL regions on September 24, 2015. The story of Brave Tank Hero revolves around a place called Paradise City that has been invaded by the Shadow Tank forces and it's up to the player, a low-ranking soldier, to take it back from them. Missions start up slowly as they introduce the player to the gameplay and gimmicks; there are a total of 50, and they make up the bulk of the gameplay. Players can also upgrade their tank and unlock other tanks. Reviews were largely negative, citing bland, meaningless, and frustrating gameplay. However, reviewers did express that there was some entertainment value in the games local multiplayer.
