= Rengoku: The Tower of Purgatory =

2005 video game

- North American box art
- Developer: Neverland
- Publishers: JP: Hudson Soft; WW: Konami
- Platform: PlayStation Portable
- Release: JP: January 27, 2005; NA: April 26, 2005; EU: February 10, 2006
- Genre: Action-adventure
- Mode: Single-player

Rengoku: The Tower of Purgatory (煉獄 The Tower of Purgatory) is a 2005 action-adventure game developed by Neverland and published by Hudson Soft for the PlayStation Portable. It was released outside Japan by Konami. The game received mixed reviews upon release. It was followed by a sequel, Rengoku II: The Stairway to H.E.A.V.E.N., which was released in 2006.

== Story ==
The player assumes the role of an android called A.D.A.M. (Autonomous Dueling Armed Machine) which was designed by humans as a war machine. However, after world peace was achieved, humans placed the androids in a tower which they named Purgatory. The androids were then instead used as entertainment, with the humans forcing them to fight in gladiatorial-style battles. The player controls one of the androids, who has become sentient and is attempting to escape from the tower and the other androids sent to stop them.

== Reception ==
Reception

Aggregate score
Aggregator	Score
Metacritic	43/100

Review scores
Publication	Score
Electronic Gaming Monthly	2.33/10 (Note: In Electronic Gaming Monthly's review of the game, one critic gave it 3/10, and the rest gave it each a score of 2/10.)
Famitsu	27/40
Game Informer	5/10
GameRevolution	D
GameSpot	5.2/10
GameSpy	2/5 stars
GameZone	6.8/10
IGN	6/10
Official U.S. PlayStation Magazine	1/5 stars
X-Play	1/5 stars

The game received "unfavorable" reviews according to Metacritic. In Japan, however, Famitsu gave it a score of 27/40. GamePro said that the game "doesn't break down, but it doesn't break new ground either." (Note: GamePro gave the game two 3.5/5 scores for graphics and sound, and two 3/5 scores for control and fun factor.)
