= Metropolismania =

2001 video game

- North American cover art
- Developer: Indi
- Publishers: JP: Media Factory; NA/EU: Natsume
- Platform: PlayStation 2
- Release: JP: September 27, 2001; NA: October 17, 2002; EU: November 8, 2002
- Genre: City-building
- Mode: Single player

Metropolismania 2
- Developer: Indi
- Publishers: JP: D3 Publisher; NA/EU: Natsume
- Platform: PlayStation 2
- Release: JP: July 13, 2006; NA: August 28, 2007; PAL: April 10, 2008
- Genre: City-building
- Mode: Single player

Metropolismania (known in Japan as Machi-ing Maker) is a city-building game developed by Indi for the PlayStation 2. It was released for the Japanese market in 2001 and internationally in 2002. The object of the game is to interact with NPCs in order to populate various towns. A sequel was announced by Natsume Inc., titled Metropolismania 2 (Machi-ing Maker 2: Zoku Boku no Machi Zukuri in Japan). The title was released on August 28, 2007 in North America and in Japan on July 13, 2006 by D3 Publisher. Another sequel, Machi-ing Maker 3, was released for the PlayStation Portable by D3 Publisher exclusively in Japan which also contains a minigame in collaboration with the Japanese gameshow Run For Money. Machi-ing Maker 4 was released November 2011 for the Xbox 360 and PS3.

== Gameplay ==
There are various goals to complete in each of the five main scenarios. Goals always involve growing the town to a given population, and often ensuring that a percentage of the buildings are of a certain type, i.e. businesses, farms, or amusement facilities. There are also side stories that occur within each scenario, sometimes including bizarre instances involving smuggling rings, a cult, and even aliens. When all requirements for the scenario have been met, the player's boss will call to congratulate them and send a letter of resignation, allowing the player to move on to the next scenario.

Gameplay also centers heavily on interaction with the in-game characters. Each character has a friendship meter that increases or decreases based on interactions such as "gossip" and giving gifts. Relationship statuses are: "stranger," "know the face," "acquaintance," "friend," and "best friend." Introducing new citizens or solving complaints is often based on good friendship status with these characters.

== Characters ==
There are several categories of characters in the game. Visually, characters within a category may have some variation, from the color of their hair to their clothing. Knowing personality types also aids the player in the game as certain conversational or "gossip" items more quickly increase the friendship meter.

For Metropolismania 2, there are universal categories of character personality types in the game. Just as in the original, characters within a category may have some design variations, like clothing or hair color, but respond to specific "gossip" topics similarly.

== Reception ==
Metropolismania

Aggregate score
Aggregator	Score
Metacritic	63/100

Review scores
Publication	Score
4Players	64%
IGN	6.5/10
Official U.S. PlayStation Magazine	3/5

Metropolismania 2

Aggregate score
Aggregator	Score
Metacritic	37/100

Review scores
Publication	Score
Famitsu	20/40
GameSpot	6.5/10
IGN	2.1/10
PALGN	4.5/10

Metropolismania received "mixed" reviews, while its sequel received "unfavorable" reviews, according to the review aggregation website Metacritic. GamePro said that the former game was "worth a visit for anyone whose ideal night of TV involves [a] The Simpsons episode where they go to Japan followed by two Iron Chef episodes back-to-back. It is, however, potentially baffling to anyone else." (Note: GamePro gave the first Metropolismania game two 2/5 scores for graphics and control, 2.5/5 for sound, and 3/5 for fun factor.) In Japan, Famitsu gave the latter game a score of one six, two fives, and one four for a total of 20 out of 40.
