= Rengoku II: The Stairway to H.E.A.V.E.N. =

2006 video game

- Developer: Neverland
- Publishers: JP: Hudson; WW: Konami
- Series: Rengoku
- Platform: PlayStation Portable
- Release: JP: April 27, 2006; NA: September 12, 2006; EU: October 20, 2006; AU: December 8, 2006
- Genre: Action-adventure
- Modes: Single-player, multiplayer

Rengoku II: The Stairway to H.E.A.V.E.N. (煉獄弐 The Stairway to H.E.A.V.E.N.) is a fantasy action-adventure game developed by Neverland and published in Japan by Hudson and worldwide by Konami for the PlayStation Portable in 2006. It is the sequel to Rengoku: The Tower of Purgatory.

== Story ==
In the game, the player controls A.D.A.M., a battle android, as he fights his way up a tower with eight floors, the first seven named after the seven deadly sins. It offers a sad, twisted, love story instead of androids gaining their "self".

While the main character shares his name from the previous title (which can be changed), they are two different characters. The game also features over 300 weapons, downloadable maps, and items, as well as wireless multiplayer for up to four people.

The game is based on the poem/story The Divine Comedy by Dante Alighieri.

== Reception ==
Reception

Aggregate score
Aggregator	Score
Metacritic	51/100

Review scores
Publication	Score
Electronic Gaming Monthly	3/10 (Note: Three critics of Electronic Gaming Monthly gave the game each a score of 3/10, 2/10, and 4/10.)
Famitsu	27/40
GameSpot	6.4/10
GameSpy	3.5/5
GameZone	5.5/10
Hardcore Gamer	4/5
IGN	5.9/10
Jeuxvideo.com	9/20
Official U.S. PlayStation Magazine	2/10
PlayStation: The Official Magazine	3/10

The game received "mixed" reviews according to the review aggregation website Metacritic. In Japan, Famitsu gave it a score of one six and three sevens for a total of 27 out of 40.
