= CIMA: The Enemy =

2003 video game

- North American cover art
- Developer: Neverland
- Publishers: NA: Natsume Inc.; JP: Marvelous Entertainment
- Director: Masahide Miyata
- Programmers: Naoki Taguchi; Yūki Tamura
- Artists: Keiji Takahashi; Masaki Kurosawa; Kaori Nishioka
- Writer: Masahide Miyata
- Composers: Tomoko Morita; Yasunori Shiono; Yukio Nakajima
- Platform: Game Boy Advance
- Release: NA: November 18, 2003; JP: October 27, 2005
- Genre: Role-playing
- Mode: Single-player

CIMA: The Enemy, known in Japan as Frontier Stories (フロンティア ストーリーズ, Furonteia Sutōrīzu), is a role-playing video game developed by Neverland for the Game Boy Advance. It was published in Japan by Marvelous Entertainment and in North America by Natsume Inc. It follows the story of Ark and Ivy, two aspiring Gate Guardians. It is their duty to protect the innocent from being captured by the CIMA, an alien race that feeds on human hope.

== Gameplay ==
In CIMA, the players must take a number of NPC characters, each with their own special abilities, out of the dungeons the CIMA have created to feed on human hope. CIMA build their dungeons on this principle: without an escape, humans lose hope. Therefore, they take their time to appear not as powerful as they could.

The game starts off with Gate Guardians Ark and Ivy in a train en route to the frontier, a land where people can start their life anew, but CIMA attack and suck the train into one of their worlds so they can feed on the humans.

The game relies on combat system where the players must direct fourteen party members to different switches.

== Characters ==
Jester R is one of the Six Stars (the six most powerful of the Gate Guardians), but does not appear much (or at all, after the first level). During the introduction, he is seen with Chief Esswood, and is the only possessor of the rare Purple Majesty. He teaches Ark and Ivy the meaning of being a Gate Guardian, and the responsibility of protection.

Ark J is the character that almost always appears as on-screen. Although at first he seems to be immature (fighting with Ivy over trivial things such as age) he grows throughout the game by learning the meaning of the Guardian's motto, "Protect Everyone". He is a Gate Guardian, under Jester's watchful eye.

Ivy F is Ark's foil, arguing with him at every turn in the first few levels. She believes that he should obey her because she has been a Guardian for a whole month longer than he has, and he replies that she should listen to him, because he is a year older than she is (about eight months). While she is snobbish at first, she grows alongside Ark, and her actions at the end of the game save the people she has vowed to protect.

Vanrose U is one of 14 pioneers headed for the new land on the Blue Creek train that is abducted by CIMA. He is a very difficult man to work with, at first. Because he does not trust Ark or Ivy, he does not follow their orders, and tends to run off on his own. Shelley, Rick, and Diana are his friends, and he worries excessively about Shelley in particular.

Shelley Y is also a pioneer, presumably going with Vanrose. She is kind, but quick to point out things that Ark and Ivy miss (such as, it's dangerous to stay here). Although she is a member of the group of 14 that Ark commands, she can also move on her own, and carries a gun that is both accurate and painful to CIMA.

== Reception ==
Reception

Aggregate score
Aggregator	Score
Metacritic	70/100

Review scores
Publication	Score
Famitsu	31/40
Game Informer	8/10
GamePro	3.5/5
GameSpy	3/5
GameZone	7/10
IGN	6/10
Nintendo Power	4.3/5
Nintendo World Report	7/10

The game received "average" reviews according to the review aggregation website Metacritic. In Japan, Famitsu gave it a score of one eight, one seven, and two eights for a total of 31 out of 40.
