= Half-Minute Hero: The Second Coming =

2011 video game

- Developer: Opus
- Publisher: Marvelous AQL
- Composer: See soundtrack section
- Platforms: PlayStation Portable, Windows
- Release: PlayStation Portable: JP: August 4, 2011; Windows: WW: April 4, 2014
- Genre: Action role-playing
- Modes: Single-player, multiplayer

Half-Minute Hero: The Second Coming (Note: Known in Japan as Yūsha 30 Second (勇者30 II, Yūsha Sanjū II)) is a 2011 action role-playing game developed by Opus and published by Marvelous. It is the sequel to Half-Minute Hero. It was released in Japan for the PlayStation Portable before being localized in English for Windows in 2014.

== Gameplay ==
The main character and an ally fighting against a robotic boss enemy. The timer is visible at the top center of the screen.

Half-Minute Hero: The Second Coming's single player mode features 5 separate episodes, each of which is unlocked after completing the previous episode. Each episode takes place hundreds of years after the previous one, and they all feature the same type of gameplay as the Hero 30 game mode in Half-Minute Hero.

Due to the various bosses in the game being able to cast a spell that kills the main character in 30 seconds, each hero is forced to make a contract with the Time Goddess that lets the player rewind time in exchange for increasing amounts of gold. The player must fight against the clock to defeat the boss as quickly as possible while completing various other objectives.

== Plot ==
The plot of the game is largely comedic in nature, and parodies many classic RPG and anime series. The story begins when the special operations soldier Yusha is called upon to eliminate the remnant Evil Lords alongside a group including the swordsman Yashu. When this is complete, he is ordered by Queen Maria to slay 8 elemental dragons who are supposedly trying to destroy the world, but later the queen turns out to be an impostor and Yusha accidentally opens the gate to the demon world by killing the dragons who had sealed it.

Yusha is imprisoned for supposedly murdering the queen, and Yashu turns against him, seeking dark powers and becoming immortal. Yusha manages to break out of prison and defeat the evil fiends. After a time skip of centuries, the story switches to Yushia, a young princess whose country is attacked by an evil Empire. With the help of her friends, she is able to defeat the emperor and return peace to the land.

After another time skip, it is revealed that "Gods" descended from on high to destroy the world due to the coexistence of humans and demons, which they found unacceptable. The rough and tumble Yuja, dubbed the "Godslayer", teams up with the blind songstress Coo to destroy the Gods and free humanity. Ultimately, the Gods are defeated by Yuja, but the Time Goddess suddenly goes insane due to the imbalance of the Timestream, becoming the evil Black Goddess. Yuja fights through time to stop her, and Coo sacrifices herself to bring her back to normal.

Finally, the Time Goddess realizes someone is pulling the strings to make sure the world is always faced by evil, ensuring balance between good and evil. The heroes from all past ages ascend to the heavens with the Goddess' help, and fight the forces of Fate, an entity who maintains the Timestream. Fate is destroyed, allowing the various races to live by their own rules.

== Development ==
Marvelous decided to localize Half-Minute Hero: The Second Coming due to the commercial success of the first game on Steam. The localizers tried to match the same style as the translation of the first game done by Xseed. Due to the extreme character limits of the game, text was forced to be concise. The game was ported from PSP in a week.

== Soundtrack ==
The soundtrack of the game features an even larger cast of composers than the previous game. They include Hideki Asanaka, Motoi Sakuraba, Kumi Tanioka, Hiroyuki Iwatsuki, Kenji Ito, Tetsuya Shibata, Yoshitaka Hirota, Yasunori Mitsuda, Yui Isshiki, Masaharu Iwata, Masashi Hamauzu, Manabu Namiki, Yoko Shimomura, Michiko Naruke, Yasuo Yamate, Takushi Hiyamuta, Maiko Iuchi, Takaaki Nakahashi, Yasumasa Yamada, Yoshino Aoki, Toshikazu Tanaka, Takeshi Toriumi, Tomonori Arai, and Takashi Jinno.

== Reception ==
Reception

Aggregate score
Aggregator	Score
Metacritic	79/100

Review scores
Publication	Score
Destructoid	8/10
GameSpot	8/10
RPGamer	3/5

Half-Minute Hero: The Second Coming received generally favorable reviews according to review aggregator Metacritic.
