= Rune Factory 2 =

2008 video game

Rune Factory 2: A Fantasy Harvest Moon
- Developer(s): Neverland Co.
- Publisher(s): JP: Marvelous Entertainment; NA: Natsume Inc.; PAL: Rising Star Games
- Director(s): Masahide Miyata
- Producer(s): Yoshifumi Hashimoto
- Artist(s): Minako Iwasaki
- Composer(s): Tomoko Morita
- Series: Rune Factory
- Platform(s): Nintendo DS
- Release: JP: January 3, 2008; NA: November 18, 2008; EU: October 8, 2010; AU: November 18, 2010
- Genre(s): Simulation, role-playing
- Mode(s): Single-player

Rune Factory 2: A Fantasy Harvest Moon (Note: ルーンファクトリー2 (Rūn Fakutorī 2) in Japan) is a 2008 role-playing simulation game developed by Neverland. It was published in Japan, North America, and Europe by Marvelous Entertainment, Natsume Inc. and Rising Star Games respectively for the Nintendo DS.

== Gameplay ==
The bottom screen of Rune Factory 2: A Fantasy Harvest Moon shows Kyle fighting an enemy in a cave, while the top screen shows a map of the location.

Rune Factory 2: A Fantasy Harvest Moon has gameplay similar to its predecessor. The game runs on its own clock and calendar; while the player is outside, one in-game minute passes every second. All four seasons are included with 30 days per season and weather varies each day.

The player begins with two tools, the hoe and the watering can, allowing the player to till the land and grow various plants after the player purchases or obtains seeds. Each type of seed has a different growth rate and cost, and some plants can be harvested multiple times. In the beginning of the game, the player is given a farm littered with rocks, stumps, and various objects littered throughout. Once the seeds are sown, the player must water them daily, after which they will be able to be picked and either sold, given away, eaten, or stored. Most plants are planted in one particular season (e.g. a spring plant will die in the ground during summer). They can be grown in certain areas outside the farm, where the climate is unchanging, but the player must water these areas that usually contain enemies.

The player interacts with objects and citizens through dialogue similar to a visual novel, including representing the townfolk with anime-styled images to narrate the story. In addition, cut scenes occur at certain points in the storyline. While every NPC has "Friend Points" that can be increased by visiting them and giving them items, seven bachelorettes also have a statistic called Love Points that increases as the player shows them affection. When a bachelorette has 10 Love Points, Kyle can marry her and raise a child who becomes the secondary playable character. His child cannot marry, but can conduct a pretend wedding instead.

The player has two types of statistics: ability and battle. The former show how well they can execute a certain task, while the latter are standard role-playing game statistics. These battle statistics can be improved either by defeating enough enemies to level up or by equipping a particular weapon or piece of equipment. The player's skills include basic tasks such as farming, fighting, and mining. A specific tool is usually required for every task, with some also being able to be used as weapons.

While exploring, the player can fight monsters to increase their strength or befriend and keep them as livestock, farmhands, as well as battling companions. Items harvested from livestock kept in barns can be sold for money or used to cook.

== Plot ==
An amnesiac boy wanders to a town named Alvarna and meets a girl named Mana, who gives him a farmland and tools to use. He decides to name himself Kyle, which can be changed. Upon developing his life with a new identity, Kyle is married to a chosen bride and has a child with her, a son named Aaron or daughter named Aria by default.

After building a school, Kyle regains his memory and remembers why he felt strong to build it and came to Alvarna. He leaves his family in the middle of the night. A few years later, his child follows clues left behind by their father and learns about the existence of Fiersome, a dragon who was sealed 1000 years ago. The child also discovers their father left so he could merge himself to Fiersome to restrain the dragon's powers. They defeat and seal the dragon away with the spell Dragon Break. Upon doing so, Kyle's spirit is sealed along with the dragon's. The child continues to find a way to separate Kyle's spirit from Fiersome back home and finds the spell Omni-Gate, eventually bringing Kyle home.

== Development ==
According to Marvelous's managing director and Harvest Moon/Story of Seasons creator, Yasuhiro Wada, Rune Factory 2 does not borrow the Harvest Moon (Bokujō Monogatari) name for the Japanese release. This was done to grow Rune Factory as an independent series and Marvelous will continue to do this with all future installments including Rune Factory Frontier. Despite this, Natsume Inc. applied the subtitle A Fantasy Harvest Moon to Rune Factory 2.

The American pre-order bonus was a plush squirrel that was included in the box when ordered from participating websites.

== Reception ==
Reception

Aggregate score
Aggregator	Score
Metacritic	77/100

Review scores
Publication	Score
GameSpot	6.5/10
GameZone	9/10
IGN	8.4/10
NGamer	81%
Nintendo Power	7/10
Official Nintendo Magazine	71%

Rune Factory 2 received "generally favorable reviews" according to the review aggregation website Metacritic. IGN said that "this sequel is not very far removed from its predecessor at all... that doesn't make it a bad game."
