= Rune Factory Frontier =

2008 video game

Rune Factory: Frontier
- Developer: Neverland
- Publishers: JP: Marvelous Entertainment; NA: Marvelous Entertainment USA; EU: Rising Star Games
- Directors: Masahide Miyata; Fumio Shimoyama
- Producer: Yoshifumi Hashimoto
- Artist: Minako Iwasaki
- Writer: Hiroyuki Asada
- Composer: Tomoko Morita
- Series: Rune Factory
- Platform: Wii
- Release: JP: November 27, 2008; NA: March 17, 2009; EU: April 1, 2010
- Genres: Simulation, action role-playing
- Mode: Single-player

Rune Factory: Frontier is a 2008 role-playing simulation game developed by Neverland for the Wii. It is a spin-off in the Rune Factory series.

== Plot ==
Frontier takes place sometime after the events of Rune Factory: A Fantasy Harvest Moon. It begins with Raguna searching for Mist, who has moved to a new town because someone is calling to her in her dreams. Raguna moves into the town as well, living in the house next to her with a field. Then Raguna finds out that the whale island in the sky is in danger of falling on the town. Somehow Mist and another girl named Iris's fates are tied with the whale's. He then starts to fight monsters in the dungeons and slowly make a living in Trampoli. After going through the dungeons, he soon finds something peculiar is happening.

Raguna, accompanied by Mist and a girl named Candy, soon discovers another girl who resembles Iris singing (revealed to be what lured Mist to Trampoli in the first place) in an underground chamber in the Snow Ruins and learns that the mastermind behind the whole ordeal is an evil scientist named Gelwein, who explains that Iris is a vampire who had split into two people due to loneliness; the Iris in the chamber is named Noire and the Iris that Raguna met earlier is named Blanche. He used a mind controlling ability called Awareness Control to influence Noire into singing a melody called the Spirit's Song to pull spirits underground to create a Dark Rune and also make the whale fall and destroy the town out of revenge for being cast out. He then has Noire attack them, but Raguna manages to defeat her, freeing her from Gelwein's control. However, if Raguna managed to befriend Blanche enough before this, she will stop Noire from attacking and break Gelwein's control over her using the blood that she sampled from Raguna earlier, skipping the fight. Gelwein escapes, revealing that he has someone stronger than the Irises. Later, upon learning that Mist is missing, Raguna searches for her and after gaining access to a sealed room in the Snow Ruins, discovers that Gelwein has captured her and is using her to draw in all the Runes in the area in order to make a larger Dark Rune, also explaining that Mist is actually an artificial child. Raguna is overwhelmed by the Dark Rune. Gelwein escapes through a portal with Mist, leaving a book called the Grimoire of Time behind. Raguna hands this to a researcher named Kanno to translate. Through the book, he learns that Gelwein and Mist are in another world called the Era of Disconnect. To open the way there, Raguna requests the help of the game's bachelorettes to grow twelve Crystal Flowers. However, he only obtains eleven as Blanche and Noire are the same person, but also finds that the flower that Mist was growing outside her house is also a Crystal Flower. With Candy's help, Raguna successfully opens the portal to the Era of Disconnect. Once there, he confronts a monster that has lost control of itself and has been communicating with Raguna through his dreams. Gelwein reveals that he was using Noire and Mist to force-feed the monster negative energy so he can control it and use it to destroy the world. He then fuses with the monster using the Dark Rune. He proves to be too powerful for Raguna, but the bachelorettes and Candy appear and, with the aid of the spirits, free Mist from the Dark Rune and sing the Spirit's Song. This cuts off Gelwein's control over the Dark Rune, allowing Raguna to defeat Gelwein and separate him from the monster. Gelwein perishes and the monster chooses to remain behind as Raguna and Mist return to their world.

== Gameplay ==
The player can own a farm. There are 4 distinct seasons, 3 of which you can grow different types of crops. Examples include: Strawberries and turnips in the spring, tomatoes and pineapples in the summer, and yams in the fall. There are many other crops, and you can grow flowers, which can all be sold for gold (the game's currency.) Farming is only half of the game. The other half is dungeon crawling. There are four very different dungeons, three of which represent the four different seasons (the third dungeon represents both autumn and winter). In these dungeons, crops of that dungeon's seasonal affiliation can be grown. The fourth dungeon, Whale Island, is omni-seasonal, and all crops can be grown there at any time.

Another feature is the concept of Runey distribution. Runeys come in four different variations: water, rock, tree and grass. Runeys represent the ecosystem of Trampoli; when Runeys are in perfect harmony, the area that they occupy reaches a state of Prosperity, and crops in that area will grow much faster than normal. However, should even one area of Trampoli become devoid of Runeys, the ecosystem suffers, and crops grow much slower than normal. Runeys can be re-distributed from area to area using a tool called the Harvester. Every nine ripe crops in the field in front of the character's house spawn one Runey daily.

Also standard to games related to Harvest Moon/Story of Seasons is the social system and marriage system. In Rune Factory: Frontier, there are a total of 13 marriageable women, as well as many other townspeople whom Raguna can socialize with. The social system involves speaking with the townspeople as well as giving them gifts, which may increase, decrease, or make their affection stay the same. As the player, you must find out what each townperson likes and dislikes and give them gifts accordingly. Additionally, you may gain affection by participating in and winning festival competitions, or doing something arbitrary that increases only a certain person's affection, such as simply maintaining your farm.

== Development ==
The game was announced during an interview between Cubed³ and Yasuhiro Wada, the creator of the Story of Seasons series, on June 6, 2007. A year later, the game was fully revealed on June 4, 2008 in the Japanese magazine Famitsu.

== Reception ==
Reception

Aggregate score
Aggregator	Score
Metacritic	79/100

Review scores
Publication	Score
Destructoid	7.5/10
Eurogamer	8/10
Famitsu	29/40
Game Informer	6.75/10
GameZone	9/10
IGN	(US) 8.3/10 (UK) 8/10
NGamer	88%
Nintendo Life	8/10
Nintendo Power	7.5/10
Nintendo World Report	8/10
Official Nintendo Magazine	85%

The game received "generally favorable reviews" according to the review aggregation website Metacritic. IGN's writer Mark Bozon praised the game's design, comparing it to the best titles in the Harvest Moon/Rune Factory series. He also praised the game's visuals and design of the world, but stated that starting the game and progressing the storyline were unintuitive ventures. In Japan, Famitsu gave it a score of one eight and three sevens for a total of 29 out of 40.
