= Rune Factory: A Fantasy Harvest Moon =

2006 video game

- Developer: Neverland
- Publishers: JP: Marvelous Interactive; NA: Natsume Inc.; PAL: Rising Star Games
- Producer: Yoshifumi Hashimoto
- Artist: Minako Iwasaki
- Composer: Tomoko Morita
- Series: Rune Factory
- Platform: Nintendo DS
- Release: JP: August 24, 2006; NA: August 15, 2007; EU: February 14, 2008; AU: March 12, 2008
- Genres: Simulation, role-playing
- Mode: Single-player

Rune Factory: A Fantasy Harvest Moon (Note: Japanese: ルーンファクトリー -新牧場物語-, Hepburn: Rūn Fakutorī -Shin Bokujō Monogatari-; lit. Rune Factory: A New Farm Story) is a 2006 role-playing simulation game developed by Neverland and published by Marvelous Interactive Inc., Natsume Inc., and Rising Star Games for the Nintendo DS handheld video game console.

== Gameplay ==
The main character, Raguna, tending to his field of crops. The world map is visible on the upper screen.

== Plot ==
The protagonist Raguna (whose name can be changed by the player) has recently lost his memory and wanders into the town of Kardia. Starved and dehydrated, he collapses in front of the house of a farmer named Mist. Having no idea who he is, she discovers Raguna outside her home and feeds him. Afterwards, Mist offers Raguna a house on her land if he promises to work the farm. Raguna accepts, and this is where the game begins.

As Raguna continues his work on Mist's farm and befriends the townsfolk, he learns that monsters have been summoned from the Forest of Beginnings and that defeating them sends them back. Raguna obtains passes to visit seven locations (Carmite Cave, Toros Cave, Clemens Cave, Mt. Gigant, Misty Bloom Cave, Kasmir Ruins, and Danaan Cave), fighting monsters and cultivating the areas. He soon learns that the monsters were summoned by devices called Shifts, built by the Sechs Empire, who seek to dominate the world.

Raguna and Mist encounter Lynette, a Sechs soldier, who explains that the reason why Sechs was summoning monsters in the first place is to capture a powerful monster called the Grimoire and use it for their own means. After destroying her tank, Lynette is forced to retreat.

Encountering Lynette again, she reveals the truth: the Grimoire is actually Terrable, a young dragon god, and that the entire ordeal was a scam arranged by Sechs to summon Terrable from the Forest of Beginnings. It was they who wiped Raguna's memory and left him at the village, also revealing that he is an Earthmate, a being with special abilities. Raguna's cultivation of the seven locations and the destruction of the Shifts and tank were also part of their plan to gather enough energy to call forth Terrable. Raguna manages to defeat Terrable and send him back. Ethelberd, Sechs' emperor, arrives and, outraged by this failure, forbids Lynette from coming home and commands her to commit suicide, but Raguna convinces her not to and instead move to Kardia, and she agrees. Ethelberd reveals that he has a backup plan to invade Kardia with a large number of tanks, prompting Raguna, Mist, and Lynette (who has now sided with Raguna) to take action.

When the army arrives, Raguna is ready to face them, but Terrable, now fully grown and allies with Raguna, arrives and stops the army with overgrown plants, forcing Ethelberd to retreat. As the citizens celebrate, a merchant named Ivan leaves the town and returns to the capital city of Norad to inform King Gilbert of the incident. They suspect that Raguna may be Ivan's long lost brother and that Ivan is really a royal who disguised himself as a merchant to investigate the town. The two then make plans to continue their conflict against Sechs.

In the main story's aftermath, Lynette moves into Mist's house and becomes an official villager. The player can then do whatever they wish from this point on, including marrying one of the bachelorettes and having a child.

== Reception ==
Reception

Aggregate score
| Aggregator | Score |
|---|---|
| Metacritic | 78/100 |

Review scores
| Publication | Score |
|---|---|
| Famitsu | 33 of 40 |
| Game Informer | 5.75 of 10 |
| GameSpot | 7.5 of 10 |
| GameSpy | 3.5/5 |
| GameZone | 9.1 of 10 |
| IGN | 8.4 of 10 |
| NGamer | 83% |
| Nintendo Power | 7 of 10 |
| Official Nintendo Magazine | 74% |
| X-Play | 4/5 |
| The A.V. Club | B+ |

Rune Factory: A Fantasy Harvest Moon received "generally favorable" reviews according to the review aggregation website Metacritic.

In Japan, Famitsu gave it one eight, one nine, one seven, and one nine, for a total of 33 out of 40. IGN gave it an Editors' Choice Award and the award for the DS Game of the Month of August 2007.
