= Half-Minute Hero =

2009 video game

- Developer: Opus
- Publishers: JP: Marvelous Entertainment; NA: XSEED Games; EU: Rising Star Games
- Director: Kotaro Yoshida
- Producer: Ryota Hayashi
- Designers: Kiichi Hosaka; Koichi Takazawa; Kazuo Araki; Yasuyuki Kobayashi; Toshinari Fujii
- Composer: Toshihiko Takamizawa
- Platforms: PlayStation Portable, Xbox Live Arcade, Microsoft Windows
- Release: PlayStation Portable: JP: May 28, 2009; NA: October 13, 2009; EU: February 19, 2010; AU: April 8, 2010; Xbox Live Arcade: WW: June 29, 2011; Microsoft Windows: WW: September 27, 2012
- Genres: Real-time strategy, action role-playing, shoot 'em up
- Modes: Single-player, multiplayer

Half-Minute Hero (Note: Known in Japan as Yūsha Sanjū (勇者３０, Yūsha Sanjū; lit. Hero 30)) is a hybrid real-time strategy action role-playing shoot 'em up video game developed by Opus. It was initially released as a PlayStation Portable exclusive in Japan on May 28, 2009, later in North America on October 13, and in Europe on February 19, 2010. It was re-released on the Xbox Live Arcade on June 29, 2011 under the title Half-Minute Hero: Super Mega Neo Climax, and on Microsoft Windows' Steam on September 27, 2012 under the title Half-Minute Hero: Super Mega Neo Climax Ultimate Boy.

A sequel, Yūsha 30 Second, was released in Japan on August 4, 2011. It was localized and released on Steam on April 4, 2014 as Half-Minute Hero: The Second Coming.

== Gameplay ==
Half-Minute Hero's single player mode features 6 different game modes. Each mode is based on one part of a larger story, and as such, the last three modes are not available until the player has completed the first three modes; these last three modes are then unlocked in order after completing the previous mode. Each mode centers around a mechanic based on a limited amount of time (normally 30 seconds as implied by the game's title) to complete that part of the game.

- Hero 30 Mode plays similar to a role-playing video game. The player, as the Hero, is tasked by the Time Goddess to become powerful enough in 30 seconds to find and defeat an enemy boss that is seeking to cast a spell of destruction that will end the world in 30 seconds. To do so, the Hero explores an overworld, encountering random monsters with battles that take place automatically based on the Hero's current equipment to gain experience levels. The Hero can enter towns where the Time Goddess will pause time, allowing for time to shop for equipment and health items, talk to residents and find allies to help in battle, as well to pay money to a statue of the Goddess to reset the countdown timer to 30 seconds. Each successive use of this power becomes more costly to the player. There are 30 missions in this mode which are completed in succession; the player can go back to previous missions to try to better their performance or find additional equipment that will carry over into future missions, but the player cannot use equipment gained on later missions during an earlier mission.
- Evil Lord 30 Mode plays similar to a real-time strategy game. The player controls Evil Lord who can summon three types of creatures, Brawlers, Shooters and Nimbles, to fight enemy forces and complete a task. The monster strengths are based on a Rock-paper-scissors approach; Nimbles are strong against Shooters and weak against Brawlers, for example. The overall strength of summoned creatures is based on the size of a mana ring that is shown around the Evil Lord character; summoning creatures and taking damage reduces the size of this ring. Wandering creatures can be brought into the Evil Lord's control by moving the mana ring over them. Due to his nature, the Evil Lord can only be out-of-doors for 30 seconds at a time, thus enforcing a 30-second countdown timer, but by paying money gained from defeating enemies to barrels where the Time Goddess is waiting, the countdown timer can be reset. There are also 30 missions to complete in this mode, but include branching paths.
- Princess 30 Mode plays similar to a shoot 'em up game. The player controls the Princess who is equipped with a rapid-fire crossbow as her main weapon, and a number of guards that carry and protect her as she ventures out of the castle to get items to help her ailing father. She is however imposed with a 30-second curfew, and her speed is dictated by the number of guards in her group; running into enemies will cause guards to fall out of the group, though the Princess can never be directly harmed. The Time Goddess has provided stretches of red carpets which, while the Princess is over them, will roll back the countdown timer but cost money to do so. The 30 missions are provided in a branching manner, with some missions leading to the ability to boost the crossbow's power or increase the running speed of the guards.
- Knight 30 Mode is an action video game, where the player controls a Knight who has vowed to help protect a Sage. The Sage has the ability to cast a spell of destruction that takes 30 seconds (though need not be continuous) to evoke; the Knight is tasked with defending the Sage during this time. This can be done by ramming into or throwing objects at enemies to stun them, or carrying the Sage to a safe location (during which the Sage cannot continue the spell). Certain levels features bells that distract the Sage and reset the spell's timer, but they can be destroyed by the Knight. If the Sage takes too much damage, the player must start the level over. The 30 missions in this mode must be completed in order.
- Hero 300 Mode is similar to Hero 30 Mode, but the player has 300 seconds to complete the single mission of this mode. The Time Goddess is not available in this mode, and furthermore, certain areas of the map become inaccessible every 60 seconds of the game, requiring the player to continue moving to find and defeat the final boss as fast as possible.
- Hero 3 Mode is also similar to Hero 30 Mode, but the player only starts with 3 seconds to reach and defeat the boss in the mode's single mission. Unlike Hero 300, the Time Goddess is available to reset time as necessary.

There is also a limited multiplayer mode in which two heroes can fight to complete a quest before the other. The multiplayer mode features three stages in which the two players will fight to collect power ups and level up in order to fight the Evil Lord at the end.

== Development ==
Half-Minute Hero was originally a downloadable freeware game called "30-Second Hero", whose concept was adopted by the producer for a PSP title. It was designed to be a quirky adaptation of the traditional, lengthy role-playing video game formula into 30 second intervals. The 8-bit graphics were designed to appear "old-school", resembling 8-bit RPGs such as early Dragon Quest and Final Fantasy games, and make the player use their imagination.

=== Soundtrack ===
The soundtrack of Half-Minute Hero features contributions from many well known Japanese game composers. They include Toshihiko Takamizawa, Yoshino Aoki, Hideki Asanaka, Kakeru Ishihama, Hiroyuki Iwatsuki, Yuzo Koshiro, Motoi Sakuraba, Koji Hayama, Norihiko Hibino, Takushi Hiyamuta, Kenji Fujisawa, Hiromi Mizutani, Yasumasa Yamada, Yasuo Yamate, Biei Morioka, Toru Nakagawa, Minako Adachi, and Megumi Komagata.

== Half-Minute Hero: Super Mega Neo Climax ==
Half-Minute Hero was re-released for the XBLA on June 29, 2011 as Half-Minute Hero: Super Mega Neo Climax. This version contains the "Super Mega Neo Climax" mode which allows the game to be played with enhanced graphics more akin to anime than 8-bit RPGs. Additionally, the "Evil Lord 30", "Princess 30", and "Knight 30" modes have been significantly reworked. Instead of the altering game styles found in the PSP version, the XBLA versions of these modes are identical in play style to "Hero 30" and feature only one level. The "Hero 30" campaign does have 6 new quests stemming from the "Treasure Land" stage, though. These quests involve the Overlord being awakened early and the hero has to acquire the aid of the five time beasts, but these levels also replace the "Another Goddess" stage found in the original version. The sound test mode, art gallery, and bestiary have also been removed from the XBLA version, normally unlocked after completing "Hero 3" in the PSP version.

Other changes include the addition of achievements, online multiplayer, as well as possible future downloadable content.

== Half-Minute Hero: Super Mega Neo Climax Ultimate Boy ==
Half-Minute Hero was re-released for the PC on Steam and Playism on September 27, 2012 as Half-Minute Hero: Super Mega Neo Climax Ultimate Boy. This version is a compilation of almost all of the game modes that featured in the previous releases with the exception of the Another Goddess and Valhalla Knights stages.

== Sequel ==
A sequel titled Yūsha 30 Second was released in Japan for the PSP on August 4, 2011. It was localized by Marvelous USA and released on Windows via Steam on April 4, 2014 as Half-Minute Hero: The Second Coming.

== Reception ==
Reception

Aggregate score
Aggregator	Score		
Aggregator	PC	PSP	Xbox 360
Metacritic	75/100	84/100	76/100

Review scores
Publication	Score		
Publication	PC	PSP	Xbox 360
Destructoid	7.5/10	9/10	7/10
Edge	N/A	8/10	N/A
Eurogamer	N/A	8/10	8/10
Game Informer	N/A	8/10	8.25/10
GamePro	N/A	4.5/5	4.5/5
GameRevolution	N/A	B−	C−
GameSpot	N/A	8/10	7.5/10
GameTrailers	N/A	8.7/10	N/A
Giant Bomb	N/A	N/A	4/5
IGN	N/A	8.8/10	8/10
Joystiq	N/A	N/A	4/5
Official Xbox Magazine (US)	N/A	N/A	7.5/10
PC Gamer (UK)	74%	N/A	N/A
PlayStation: The Official Magazine	N/A	4.5/5	N/A
The A.V. Club	N/A	A−	N/A

=== Critical reception ===
Half-Minute Hero received "generally favorable reviews" on all platforms according to the review aggregation website Metacritic. In Japan, Famitsu gave the PSP version a score of one eight, one nine, and two eights for a total of 33 out of 40.

=== Awards ===
Half-Minute Hero won several awards from RPG-focused websites:

- RPGamer Editor's Choice: Best PSP RPG, 2009 RPGamer Best of 2009 Awards
- PSP Game of the Year, RPGLand Games of the Year 2009
- PSP RPG of the Year, RPGFan Best of 2009 Awards
