= Rune Factory 3 =

2009 video game

- Developer: Neverland
- Publishers: JP: Marvelous Entertainment; NA: Natsume Inc.; EU: Rising Star Games
- Directors: Masahide Miyata; Kenichi Murakami
- Producers: Yoshifumi Hashimoto; Shinji Motoki
- Artists: Minako Iwasaki; Takitaro; Masato Yamane; Oyaji
- Composer: Tomoko Morita
- Series: Rune Factory
- Platforms: Nintendo DS; Nintendo Switch; Windows
- Release: Nintendo DS: JP: October 22, 2009; NA: November 9, 2010; EU: September 30, 2011; Nintendo Switch: JP: March 2, 2023; WW: September 5, 2023; Windows: WW: September 5, 2023
- Genre: Role-playing
- Modes: Single-player, multiplayer

Rune Factory 3: A Fantasy Harvest Moon (Note: ルーンファクトリー3 (Rūn Fakutorī 3) in Japan) is a 2009 simulation role-playing video game developed by Neverland for the Nintendo DS. It was published in Japan by Marvelous Entertainment, in North America by Natsume Inc. in 2010, and in Europe by Rising Star Games in 2011. It is the fourth game in the Rune Factory series.

A remaster, Rune Factory 3 Special, was released for the Nintendo Switch in Japan in March 2023, followed by a worldwide release for both Switch and Windows in September.

== Gameplay ==
The game features new AI with dynamic schedules, as well as new battle commands and NPC interaction. Other changes in the game include: the player can transform into a golden Wooly (bipedal sheep-like creatures), plants can be grown underground under a special tree that Micah lives in, villagers can now join you in battle and lend you their skills as battle companions, and the game's new multiplayer mode lets up to three players work together to conquer dungeons with rare items and monsters more interactively than the previous games.

== Plot ==
Micah (whose name can be changed by the player), a golden sheep-like monster called a Wooly, falls from the sky and into a village called Sharance. The unconscious Wooly is found by a girl named Shara. Despite the protests of her grandfather Wells, who resents monsters, she brings it inside and takes care of it. The next day, the Wooly turns into a human, revealing that he is an amnesiac half-human and half-monster. Tasked with raising the farm around the massive Sharance Tree, Micah discovers that for reasons unknown, the tree has not bloomed for fifty years, thus the land started decaying. After recovering the ability to transform into a Wooly, he discovers his true identity and decides to keep his true nature a secret from the other villagers. Micah also makes contact with a Univir settlement located in a desert, but only interacts with them in his Wooly form as they detest humans, hiding his human persona from them. He learns that both the villagers and the Univir had a friendly relationship in the past, but have started to estrange each other since. After regaining his memory, which was sealed in mysterious orbs and unlocked upon defeating bosses, Micah eventually gains each faction's trust and eventually settles their differences and resume their peaceful coexistence.

When Micah finally becomes engaged with one of the bachelorettes, his girlfriend mysteriously disappears on their wedding day and he sets into a ruin located on the outskirts of the village to find her. Reaching the deepest part of the ruins, Micah is forced to confront Aquaticus, a large water dragon who is keeping his girlfriend imprisoned, claiming that humans and Univir should never become together and he, a half-monster, should not marry into neither race. Seeing Micah's determination to fight for his betrothed, Aquaticus reveals that all was part of his plan to have both humans and Univir reconciled as only the Sharance Tree could be fully-restored to prevent the world's destruction, having wiped his memories to ensure that he completes this task. The game ends with Micah's marriage with his girlfriend and the Sharance Tree in full bloom once more, after which the couple may opt to have a child.

== Reception ==
Reception

Aggregate score
Aggregator	Score
Metacritic	77 of 100

Review scores
Publication	Score
Famitsu	33 of 40
GamesRadar+	3 of 5
GameZone	8.5 of 10
IGN	8 of 10
NGamer	80%
Nintendo Life	8 of 10
Nintendo Power	8.5 of 10
Official Nintendo Magazine	67%

Rune Factory 3: A Fantasy Harvest Moon received "generally favorable reviews" according to the review aggregation website Metacritic. In Japan, Famitsu gave it a score of one nine and three eights for a total of 33 out of 40.
