= Neverland (company) =

Japanese video game developer

- Native name: 株式会社ネバーランドカンパニー
- Industry: Video game
- Founded: May 7, 1993; 33 years ago
- Defunct: November 29, 2013
- Products: Rune Factory

Neverland Company Inc. (Note: Japanese: 株式会社ネバーランドカンパニー, Hepburn: Kabushiki-gaisha Nebārando Kanpanī) was a Japanese video game developer founded on May 7, 1993. It has developed games for Super NES, Dreamcast, GameCube, PlayStation 2, Game Boy Color, Nintendo DS, Nintendo 3DS, PlayStation Portable, PlayStation 3 and the Wii. The most notable games this company developed were part of the Lufia and Rune Factory series of video games. By November 2013, the company ceased operations and filed for bankruptcy. The following year, many former members of the studio were hired by Marvelous, who had published many of its previous games.

== History ==
Rune Factory 4 was the final game developed by Neverland. The company filed for bankruptcy on November 29, 2013.

== Games developed ==
Year	Title	Platform	Publisher	Ref.
1993	Lufia & the Fortress of Doom	Super Nintendo Entertainment System	Taito	
1994	Hat Trick Hero 2	Super Nintendo Entertainment System	Taito	
1995	Lufia II: Rise of the Sinistrals	Super Nintendo Entertainment System	Taito, Natsume	
1996	Chaos Seed: Fūsui Kairoki	Super Nintendo Entertainment System	Taito	
1996	Energy Breaker	Super Nintendo Entertainment System	Taito	
1998	Senkutsu Katsuryu Taisen: Chaos Seed	Sega Saturn	Neverland	
2001	Lufia: The Legend Returns	Game Boy Color	Natsume	
2001	Record of Lodoss War: Advent of Cardice	Dreamcast	Conspiracy Entertainment	
2002	Fushigi no Dungeon: Furai no Shiren Gaiden: Jokenji Asuka Kenzan!	Dreamcast	Sega	
2003	CIMA: The Enemy	Game Boy Advance	Natsume	
2003	Disney's Party	GameCube	Electronic Arts	
2005	Shining Force Neo	PlayStation 2	Sega	
2005	Rengoku: The Tower of Purgatory	PlayStation Portable	Konami	
2005	Egg Monster Hero	Nintendo DS	Square Enix	
2006	Rengoku II: The Stairway to H.E.A.V.E.N.	PlayStation Portable	Konami	
2007	Shining Force EXA	PlayStation 2	Sega	
2007	Rune Factory: A Fantasy Harvest Moon	Nintendo DS	Natsume	
2008	Rune Factory 2: A Fantasy Harvest Moon	Nintendo DS	Natsume	
2009	Rune Factory Frontier	Nintendo Wii	Xseed Games	
2010	Rune Factory 3: A Fantasy Harvest Moon	Nintendo DS	Natsume	
2010	Lufia: Curse of the Sinistrals	Nintendo DS	Natsume	
2011	Rune Factory: Tides of Destiny	PlayStation 3	Natsume	
2013	Rune Factory 4	Nintendo 3DS	Natsume	
