= Marvelous (company) =

Japanese anime producer and video game company

Marvelous Inc.
- Current logo used since 2014

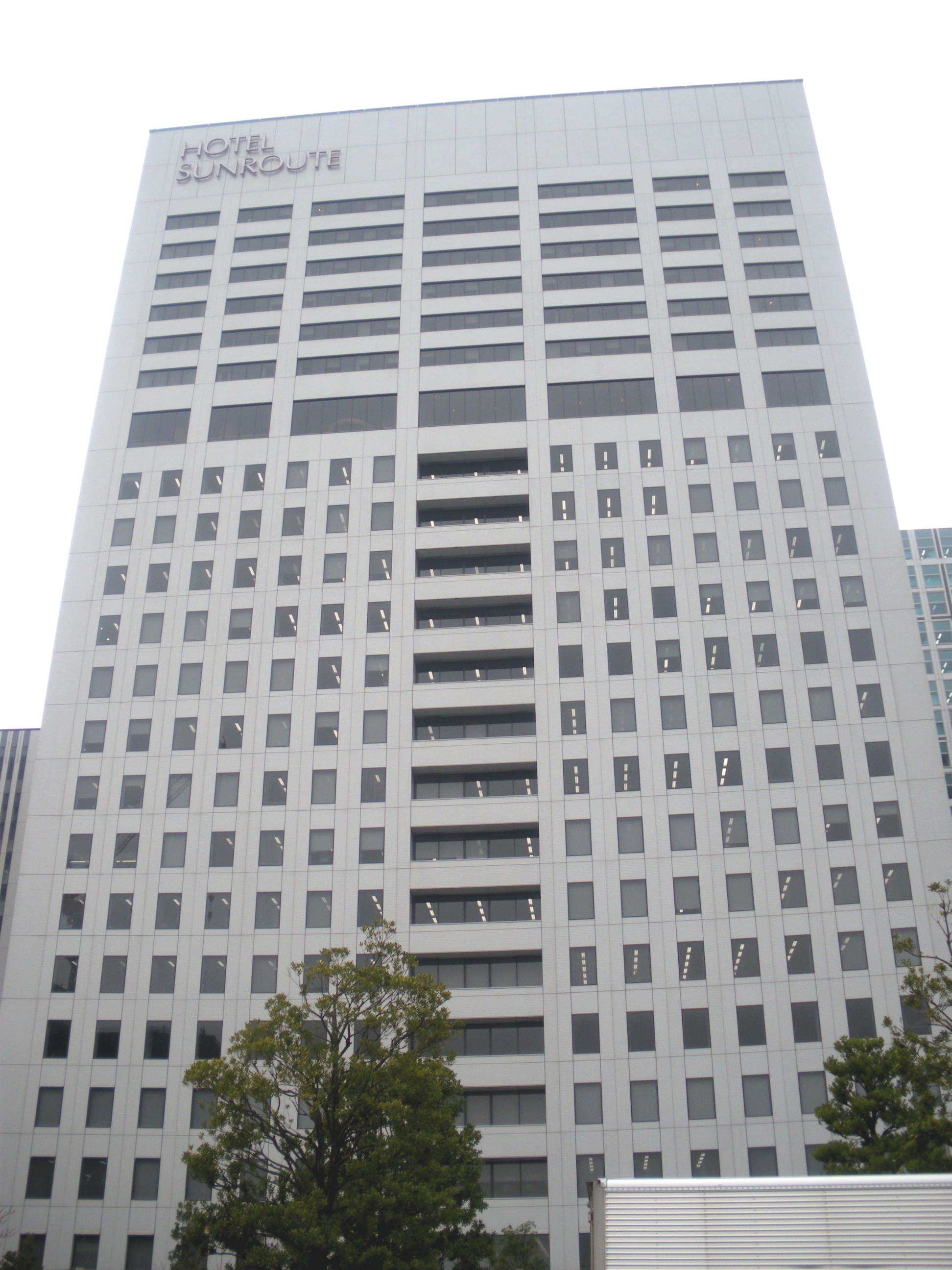
- Headquarters in Shinagawa, Tokyo
- Native name: 株式会社マーベラス
- Romanized name: Kabushiki-gaisha Māberasu
- Formerly: Marvelous Entertainment, Inc. (1997–2011); Marvelous AQL Inc. (2011–2014)
- Type: Public (K.K.)
- Traded as: TYO: 7844
- Industry: Video games Anime industry
- Predecessor: AQ Interactive; Liveware
- Founded: June 25, 1997; 29 years ago
- Headquarters: Higashishinagawa, Shinagawa, Tokyo, Japan
- Key people: Haruki Nakayama (chairman/president/CEO); Shuichi Motoda (vice chairman); Toshinori Aoki (executive vice president/Co-COO); Takashi Sensui (EVP/Co-COO)
- Products: Anime; Video games
- Revenue: ¥20,330,000,000 (2014)
- Net income: ¥1,882,000,000 (2014)
- Number of employees: 605; As of September 30, 2021 (consolidated basis)
- Subsidiaries: Artland; Marvelous USA; Link Think; Delfisound; Marvelous First Studio; Marvelous Europe; G-Mode; Honey∞Parade Games; Hakama
- Website: www.marv.jp

Marvelous Inc. (株式会社マーベラス, Kabushiki-gaisha Māberasu; previously known as Marvelous Entertainment and Marvelous AQL, stylized as MARVELOUS!) is a Japanese video game developer and publisher, and anime producer. The company was founded in 1997 but formed in its current state in October 2011 after MMV acquired AQ Interactive and Liveware.

== History ==
Logo as Marvelous Entertainment, used from 1997 to 2011

Previous logo prior to the company's name change in 2014

=== MMV ===
Locally, MMV was involved in a number of forms of entertainment, including the production of anime and music by its two subsidiaries Artland and Delfi Sound respectively. Artland is an animation studio that produced a number of popular manga and anime including the award-winning Mushishi and the hit shōnen Katekyō Hitman Reborn!, and Delfi Sound is a recording studio that was involved in the production of a number of albums, radio dramas, and soundtracks since its establishment in 2005. MMV also produced a number of live television series, movies, and musical theatre productions, like the highly popular Prince of Tennis musical, Tenimyu.

=== Merge with AQ Interactive ===
In 2011, AQ Interactive merged with Marvelous Entertainment (along with mobile gaming company Liveware). The combined company became Marvelous AQL Inc., and AQ was absorbed into the Marvelous business operations. The merge was effective on May 10, 2011. The plan would make Marvelous Entertainment Inc. the sole surviving entity after the merger, with Marvelous Entertainment Inc. renamed to Marvelous AQL Inc. on merger day.

On December 22, 2011, MarvelousAQL Inc. announced the establishment of the overseas business department, with investment from Checkpoint Studios Inc., replacing the global strategy room, which dissolved on January 1, 2012.

On October 25, 2012, MarvelousAQL Inc. announced its stock listing on the first section of the Tokyo Stock Exchange, effective on November 1, 2012.

On January 1, 2013, MarvelousAQL Inc. established the amusement business division. The company's digital contents business division and amusement contents development division were moved into amusement business division, and was renamed as amusement development division.

On February 1, 2013, MarvelousAQL Inc. established the digital contents business division.

On July 1, 2014, MarvelousAQL Inc. was renamed as Marvelous Inc.

On March 13, 2015, it was announced that Marvelous would acquire mobile gaming company G-Mode. This includes Data East IPs that G-Mode bought in 2004.

Tencent acquired a 20% stake of Marvelous via new shares, approximately US$65 million on May 26, 2020.

On May 25, 2023, the company livestreamed its first ever digital showcase which featured the syn Sophia-developed Fashion Dreamer and several newly announced upcoming games including a couple of new IPs tentatively titled PROJECT MAGIA and PROJECT LIFE is RPG, several new entries in the flagship Story of Seasons and Rune Factory series, and Daemon X Machina: Titanic Scion, a sequel to the original Daemon X Machina.

On July 31st, 2026, Tencent sold off their shares of Marvelous and severed their business ties with them.

== Subsidiaries ==
=== Development ===
==== Current ====
Name	Location	Founded	Information
Hakama Inc.	Shibuya, Tokyo, Japan	2017	A studio led by Story of Seasons and Rune Factory producer Yoshifumi Hashimoto.
Honey Parade Games	Shinagawa, Tokyo, Japan	2017	Styled as "Honey∞Parade Games", they were formed by Marvelous as an internal studio for the Senran Kagura franchise. Kenichiro Takaki lead the studio until he left Marvelous in 2019.
Marvelous First Studio	Japan	2017	An internal development studio that has worked on titles such as Fate/Extella Link, God Eater 3, and Daemon X Machina. It is made up of former employees of Cavia, Artoon, and Feelplus which were all folded by AQ Interactive in 2010. Kenichiro Tsukuda leads the studio.

==== Former ====
Name	Location	Founded	Acquired	Sold/Closed	Information
Entersphere Inc.	Shinagawa, Tokyo	May 2008	December 2012	May 2015	Marvelous AQL Inc. announced the acquisition of the studio on December 21, 2012 with the purchase being completed on January 11, 2013. Marvelous sold off all its shares in the studio in 2015. They were renamed Techno Maria in October 2017 and filed for bankruptcy on January 9, 2018.

=== Publication and distribution ===
==== Current ====
Name	Location	Founded	Acquired	Information
Marvelous Europe Limited	London, United Kingdom (previously Tunbridge Wells, United Kingdom)	April 2012	N/A	Publishing and distribution arm for Marvelous' titles in Europe. They were originally formed as MAQL Europe Limited and were renamed in June 2014.
Marvelous USA Inc.	Torrance, California, United States	2004	October 2011	Publishing and distribution arm for Marvelous' titles in North America. Third-party games are publish under their former Xseed Games name. The company was carried over from AQ Interactive during the merger. Initially known as Xseed JKS, Inc., the company was renamed Marvelous USA Inc. on May 7, 2013, after purchasing the Index Digital Media, Inc.'s online business unit, which had transferred to Xseed JKS, Inc. on March 31.

==== Former ====
Name	Location	Founded	Acquired	Sold/Closed	Information
Artland Co, Ltd.	Musashino, Tokyo, Japan	September 1978	April 2006	April 2015	A Japanese animation studio that was acquired by Marvelous Entertainment Inc. in April 2006 as Artland LLC, and renamed shortly after the purchase. The animation studio portion of the company was split off independently in December 2010 and the rest of the company was absorbed by Marvelous in April 2015.
LINKTHINK Inc.	Japan	July 2006	October 2011	April 2017	The company was previously acquired by AQ Interactive in April 2009. Marvelous absorbed the company in April 2017.

Animation Studio Artland (株式会社アニメーションスタジオ・アートランド) is an animation studio established via dividing Artland, Inc. On 15 November 2010, Marvelous Entertainment Inc. announced the separating Artland, Inc.'s animation production into Animation Studio Artland, Inc. as a fully owned subsidiary of Marvelous Entertainment Inc., effective on December 1, 2010.

Marvelous Online (マーベラス・オンライン) is an online store for Marvelous Entertainment Inc. products. Marvelous Entertainment Inc. announced the establishment of Marvelous Online on May 2, 2009.

Runtime, Inc. (有限会社ランタイム) was a software development, video game production, CG production company, established on July 18, 2001. On March 17, 2006, Marvelous Entertainment Inc. announced Runtime, Inc. would become a subsidiary of Marvelous Entertainment Inc., effective on April 3, 2006. On January 28, 2008, Marvelous Entertainment Inc. announced Runtime, Inc. would be merged into its parent company, Marvelous Entertainment Inc., effective on April 1, 2008.

Marvelous Music Publishing, Inc. (株式会社マーベラス音楽出版) was a wholly owned subsidiary of Marvelous Entertainment Inc., established from its parent's former copyright and publishing businesses. On July 1, 2001, Marvelous Entertainment Inc. announced the establishment of Marvelous Music Publishing, Inc. On January 23, 2007, Marvelous Entertainment Inc. announced Marvelous Music Publishing, Inc. would be merged into its parent company, Marvelous Entertainment Inc., effective on April 1, 2007.

Marvelous Liveware Inc. (株式会社マーベラスライブウェア) was a mobile phone Internet contents development subsidiary of Marvelous Entertainment Inc. On April 27, 2004, Marvelous Entertainment Inc. announced the establishment of the subsidiary Marvelous Liveware Inc., effective on June 1, 2004. On March 31, 2005, Marvelous Entertainment Inc. announced the sales of Marvelous Liveware to Interspire, inc.

Marvelous Interactive Inc. (株式会社マーベラスインタラクティブ) was a developer and publisher of video games, established on August 3, 1970, as Pack-In-Video and later renamed Victor Interactive Software after Victor Entertainment merged with Pack-In-Video on October 1, 1996. On March 24, 2003, Marvelous Entertainment Inc. announced had acquired 55% stake of Victor Interactive Software, and would rename Victor Interactive Software to Marvelous Interactive Inc., effective on March 31, 2003. In the press release, Marvelous Entertainment Inc. listed the then upcoming Marvelous Interactive Inc. was established on October 1, 1996. On September 10, 2003, Marvelous Entertainment Inc. announced Marvelous Interactive Inc. would become a wholly owned subsidiary of Marvelous Entertainment Inc. When Marvelous Entertainment Inc. completed its acquisition of Victor Interactive Software on March 31, 2003, it was renamed Marvelous Interactive. With this acquisition MMV obtained all the rights to the popular Story of Seasons series and other Victor Interactive Software series. On March 20, 2007, Marvelous Entertainment Inc. announced Marvelous Interactive Inc. would be merged into its parent company, Marvelous Entertainment Inc., effective on June 30, 2007.

Mad (株式会社マッド) was an amusement facility operator. On March 20, 2007, Marvelous Entertainment Inc. announced a restructuring plan that would transfer amusement business to Atlus, by moving it to Mad (株式会社マッド) as a wholly owned subsidiary of Marvelous Entertainment Inc., which would be established on June 1, 2007; the remaining businesses would be operated under Marvelous Entertainment Inc. The transfer also included sale of The Third Planet (株式会社ザ・サードプラネット) amusement operations, effective on July 1, 2007. At Atlus, the company announced merging Mad into Atlus effective on September 1, 2007, with merger registered on September 3, 2007.

Delfi Sound Inc. (株式会社デルファイサウンド) It is a recording studio, album production, and music label company. The company was established on April 1, 2005, as Marvelous Studio Inc. (株式会社マーベラススタジオ). On March 22, 2005, Marvelous Entertainment Inc. announced the establishment of the subsidiary Marvelous Studio Inc., effective on April 1, 2005. On January 22, 2010, Marvelous Entertainment Inc. announced transferring 100% of its Delfi Sound Inc. shares to Amuse Capital Inc. (株式会社アミューズキャピタル), effective on January 29, 2010.

Rising Star Games was a video game publisher and distributor within Europe and all other PAL territories. On December 24, 2004, Marvelous Entertainment Inc. announced the establishment of a London-based joint venture company called Rising Star Games Limited with Bergsala AB. Marvelous Entertainment Inc. would own 51% shares of the company, while Bergsala AB own the remaining 49%. The company would begin operation in 2004–12. MMV decided to gain a foothold on the European market first because most Japanese publishers have not really focused on it. About a year later, Rising Star Games and Atari teamed up to start releasing games for the Nintendo DS and PSP and has since experienced great success in Europe. As of March 31, 2008, Harvest Moon DS managed to sell over 300,000 copies and ship over 500,000 copies across the continent. Rising Star Games has also released over 30 games in Europe, including No More Heroes and a ported version of Harvest Moon: Magical Melody for the Wii. On January 22, 2010, Marvelous Entertainment Inc. announced transferring all of its remaining 51% of Rising Star Games Limited stakes to Intergrow Inc. (株式会社インターグロー), effective on January 29, 2010.

Marvelous Entertainment USA, Inc. (MMV USA): on May 9, 2008, MMV announced that it would be partnering up with Xseed Games to co-publish games in North America. On May 16, 2005, Marvelous Entertainment Inc. announced it had acquired the shares of an American company AQ Interactive and it would be renamed as Marvelous Entertainment USA as 100% subsidiary of Marvelous Entertainment effective in May 2005. On May 9, 2008, Marvelous Entertainment Inc. and Xseed Games announced it had entered a co-publishing partnership. The North American video game sales would begin in November 2008. On May 31, 2011, Marvelous Entertainment Inc. announced transferring 100% of its Marvelous Entertainment USA, Inc. shares to Rising Star Games Limited, effective on June 30, 2011.

== Video games ==
=== Developed ===
Note: The below tables are limited to games developed or published by Marvelous in Japan after the merger with AQ Interactive to form Marvelous (AQL); May 2011; see here for games released prior to this date.

Story of Seasons and related crossovers
Name	Platform	Release date	Other information
Harvest Moon: A New Beginning	Nintendo 3DS	JP: February 23, 2012; NA: October 19, 2012; EU: September 20, 2013; AU: November 14, 2013	Published by Natsume Inc. in North America; final Story of Seasons game to be localized and published in North America by Natsume.
Story of Seasons	Nintendo 3DS	JP: February 27, 2014; NA: March 31, 2015; EU: December 31, 2015; AU: January 9, 2016	Published by Nintendo in Europe.
Story of Seasons: Trio of Towns	Nintendo 3DS	JP: June 23, 2016; NA: February 28, 2017; EU: October 13, 2017; AU: October 14, 2017	Published by Nintendo in Europe.
Story of Seasons: Friends of Mineral Town	Nintendo Switch	JP: October 17, 2019; PAL: July 10, 2020; NA: July 14, 2020	Remake of Harvest Moon: Friends of Mineral Town and Harvest Moon: More Friends of Mineral Town; first game in the main series playable on PC.
Story of Seasons: Friends of Mineral Town	Microsoft Windows	WW: July 10, 2020	Remake of Harvest Moon: Friends of Mineral Town and Harvest Moon: More Friends of Mineral Town; first game in the main series playable on PC.
Story of Seasons: Friends of Mineral Town	Xbox One; PlayStation 4	Xbox One & PlayStation 4: PAL: October 15, 2021; NA: October 26, 2021; JP Xbox One: October 27, 2021; JP PlayStation 4: November 25, 2021	Remake of Harvest Moon: Friends of Mineral Town and Harvest Moon: More Friends of Mineral Town; first game in the main series playable on PC.
Story of Seasons: Pioneers of Olive Town	Nintendo Switch	JP: February 25, 2021; NA: March 23, 2021; PAL: March 26, 2021	
Story of Seasons: Pioneers of Olive Town	Microsoft Windows	WW: September 15, 2021	
Story of Seasons: Pioneers of Olive Town	PlayStation 4	JP: July 28, 2022; NA: July 26, 2022; PAL: July 29, 2022	
Story of Seasons: A Wonderful Life	Nintendo Switch; PlayStation 5; Xbox Series X/S; Microsoft Windows	WW: June 27, 2023	Remake of Harvest Moon: A Wonderful Life and Harvest Moon: Another Wonderful Life.
Story of Seasons: Grand Bazaar	Nintendo Switch; Nintendo Switch 2; Microsoft Windows	WW: August 27, 2025	Remake of Harvest Moon DS: Grand Bazaar.
Doraemon Story of Seasons	Nintendo Switch; Microsoft Windows	JP: June 13, 2019; WW: October 11, 2019	Co-developed by Brownies and published by Bandai Namco Entertainment.
Doraemon Story of Seasons	PlayStation 4	JP: July 30, 2020; WW: September 4, 2020	Co-developed by Brownies and published by Bandai Namco Entertainment.
Doraemon Story of Seasons: Friends of the Great Kingdom	Nintendo Switch; PlayStation 5; Microsoft Windows	WW: November 2, 2022	Co-developed by Brownies and published by Bandai Namco Entertainment.

Rune Factory
Name	Platform	Release date	Other information
Rune Factory 4	Nintendo 3DS	JP: July 19, 2012; NA: October 1, 2013; PAL: December 11, 2014	Developed by Neverland
Rune Factory 4 Special	Nintendo Switch	JP: July 25, 2019; NA: February 25, 2020; PAL: February 28, 2020	Remaster of Rune Factory 4.
Rune Factory 4 Special	Microsoft Windows; PlayStation 4; Xbox One	WW: December 7, 2021	Remaster of Rune Factory 4.
Rune Factory 5	Nintendo Switch	JP: May 20, 2021; NA: March 22, 2022; EU: March 25, 2022	
Rune Factory 5	Microsoft Windows	WW: July 13, 2022	
Rune Factory 5	PlayStation 5 Xbox Series X/S	WW: 2027	
Rune Factory 3 Special	Nintendo Switch	JP: March 2, 2023; WW: September 5, 2023	Remaster of Rune Factory 3.
Rune Factory 3 Special	Microsoft Windows	WW: September 5, 2023	Remaster of Rune Factory 3.
Rune Factory 3 Special	PlayStation 5 Xbox Series X/S	WW: 2027	Remaster of Rune Factory 3.
Rune Factory: Guardians of Azuma	Nintendo Switch; Nintendo Switch 2; Microsoft Windows	WW: June 5, 2025	
Rune Factory: Guardians of Azuma	PlayStation 5; Xbox Series X/S	WW: February 13, 2026	

Monster Hunter Stories (turn-based RPG spin-off series of Monster Hunter; co-developed and published by Capcom)
Name	Platform	Release date	Other information
Monster Hunter Stories	Nintendo 3DS	JP: October 8, 2016; NA & EU: September 8, 2017; AU: September 9, 2017	
Monster Hunter Stories	iOS; Android	JP: December 4, 2017; WW: September 25, 2018	
Monster Hunter Stories	Nintendo Switch; PlayStation 4; Microsoft Windows	WW: June 14, 2024	Remastered version.
Monster Hunter Stories 2: Wings of Ruin	Nintendo Switch; Microsoft Windows	WW: July 9, 2021	
Monster Hunter Stories 2: Wings of Ruin	PlayStation 4	WW: June 14, 2024	

Other Games
Lord of Magna: Maiden Heaven		JP: October 2, 2014; NA: June 2, 2015; PAL: June 4, 2015	
Return to PopoloCrois		JP: June 18, 2015; PAL: February 18, 2016; NA: March 1, 2016	Co-developed with epics.
JP: Itadaki Street Wii (いただきストリートWii) NA: Fortune Street EU: Boom Street	Nintendo Wii	JP: December 1, 2011; NA: December 5, 2011; EU: December 23, 2011; AU: January 5, 2012	Revealed by Nintendo at E3 2011. It was the first game in the Itadaki Street series to be published outside Japan. The game includes characters from the Dragon Quest series and the Mario series. Co-developed by and published in Japan by Square Enix and Nintendo outside of Japan.
Senran Kagura: Skirting Shadows	Nintendo 3DS	JP: September 22, 2011	
Senran Kagura Burst	Nintendo 3DS	JP: August 30, 2012; NA: November 14, 2013; PAL: February 27, 2014	
Senran Kagura Burst Re:Newal	PlayStation 4	JP: February 22, 2018; PAL: January 18, 2019; NA: January 22, 2019	Developed by Tamsoft.
Senran Kagura Burst Re:Newal	Microsoft Windows	WW: January 22, 2019	Developed by Tamsoft.
Senran Kagura 2: Deep Crimson	Nintendo 3DS	JP: August 7, 2014; WW: August 2015	
Mario & Sonic at the Sochi 2014 Olympic Winter Games	Nintendo Wii U	EU: November 8, 2013; AU: November 9, 2013; NA: November 15, 2013; JP: December 5, 2013	Co-developed with Sega, published by Nintendo.
Daemon X Machina	Nintendo Switch	WW: September 13, 2019	Switch version published by Nintendo outside of Japan.
Daemon X Machina	Microsoft Windows	WW: February 13, 2020	
Fate/Extella: The Umbral Star	PlayStation 4; PlayStation Vita	JP: November 10, 2016; NA: January 17, 2017; EU: January 20, 2017	
Fate/Extella: The Umbral Star	Nintendo Switch	JP: July 20, 2017; PAL: July 21, 2017; NA: July 25, 2017	
Fate/Extella: The Umbral Star	Microsoft Windows	WW: July 25, 2017	
Fate/Extella: The Umbral Star	Android; iOS	JP: July 22, 2020	
Senran Kagura: Peach Beach Splash	PlayStation 4	JP: March 16, 2017; WW: September 26, 2017	Developed by Tamsoft.
Senran Kagura: Peach Beach Splash	Microsoft Windows	WW: March 7, 2018	Developed by Tamsoft.
God Eater 3	PlayStation 4	JP: December 13, 2018; WW: February 8, 2019	Co-developed with and published by Bandai Namco Studios.
God Eater 3	Microsoft Windows	WW: February 8, 2019	Co-developed with and published by Bandai Namco Studios.
God Eater 3	Nintendo Switch	JP: July 11, 2019; WW: July 12, 2019	Co-developed with and published by Bandai Namco Studios.
Loop8: Summer of Gods	PlayStation 4; Nintendo Switch; Xbox One; Microsoft Windows	JP: June 1, 2023; WW: June 6, 2023	Developed by Sieg Games.
Farmagia	Nintendo Switch; Microsoft Windows; PlayStation 5	WW: November 1, 2024	
Muramasa: Revenant Blades	Nintendo Switch; Nintendo Switch 2; Microsoft Windows; PlayStation 5	WW: 2027	
Eternal Anima	Nintendo Switch 2; Microsoft Windows; PlayStation 5; Xbox Series X/S	WW: 2027	
	No More Heroes (Engine Software; originally developed by Grasshopper Manufacture); No More Heroes 2: Desperate Struggle (Engine Software; originally developed by Grasshopper Manufacture); No More Heroes III (developed by Grasshopper Manufacture, only published in Japan); Fashion Dreamer (developed by Syn Sophia); ==== PlayStation 3 ==== : Nitroplus Blasterz: Heroines Infinite Duel (developed by Examu and co-publish with Nitroplus); ==== PlayStation Portable ==== : English Detective Mysteria; Fate/Extra; Fate/Extra CCC; Valhalla Knights; Valhalla Knights 2; ==== PlayStation Vita ==== : Browser Sangokushi Next (PlayStation Network); IA/VT Colorful; Muramasa: Rebirth; New Little King's Story (developed / published by Konami); Senran Kagura Bon Appétit!; Senran Kagura Shinovi Versus; Soul Sacrifice (co-developed / published by Sony Computer Entertainment); Soul Sacrifice Delta (co-developed / published by Sony Computer Entertainment); Super Monkey Ball Banana Splitz (published by Sega); Uppers; Valhalla Knights 3 (developed by K2 LLC); Valhalla Knights 3 Gold; Half-Minute Hero: The Second Coming (developed by Opus); Senran Kagura: Estival Versus; Net High; ==== PlayStation 4 ==== : Senran Kagura: Estival Versus; Senran Kagura: Peach Beach Splash; Senran Kagura Burst Re:Newal; Nitroplus Blasterz: Heroines Infinite Duel (developed by Examu and co-published with Nitroplus); Travis Strikes Again: No More Heroes; Kandagawa Jet Girls (developed by Honey∞Parade Games, a subsidiary of Marvelous); ==== Microsoft Windows ==== : Half-Minute Hero: Super Mega Neo Climax Ultimate Boy; Skullgirls (formerly); Half-Minute Hero: The Second Coming (developed by Opus); Fate/Extella: The Umbral Star; Bullet Witch; Travis Strikes Again: No More Heroes; No More Heroes (Engine Software; originally developed by Grasshopper Manufacture); No More Heroes 2: Desperate Struggle (Engine Software; originally developed by Grasshopper Manufacture)		

==== Canceled ====
- Kaio: King of Pirates (developed by Comcept)

==== Arcade ====
- Pokémon Battario
- Pokémon Tretta
- Pokémon Ga-Olé
- Pokémon Mezastar
- Pokémon Frienda
- Tatakae! Dragon Quest Scan Battlers
- Wacca

==== Mobile ====
- RunBot (developed by Bravo Game Studios)
- Puzzle Coaster (developed by Bravo Game Studios)
- Eyes Attack (developed by Alexander Murzanaev)
- Osomatsu-san NEET Island
- Shinobi Master Senran Kagura: New Link (developed by Honey ∞ Parade Games)
- Fate/Extella: The Umbral Star
- Fate/Extella Link

==== Browser game ====
- Logres of Swords and Sorcery

=== Published ===
- Freedom Planet 2
- Cuisineer (published under XSeed Games banner)
- Moonlight Peaks (published under XSeed Games banner)

== Anime ==
- Aura: Maryūinkōga Saigo no Tatakai
- Cat God
- Gunslinger Girl
- Gunslinger Girl -Il Teatrino-
- Suite PreCure: Take it back! The Miraculous Melody that Connects Hearts!
- HHH Triple Ecchi
- Humanity Has Declined
- Mushishi
- (The) Prince of Tennis II
- Princess Tutu
- Prism Ark
- Ring ni Kakero 1: Shadow
- Saint Beast: Kouin Jojishi Tenshi Tan
- Senran Kagura
- Senran Kagura: Shinovi Master -Tokyo Yōma-hen-
- Tokyo Majin
- Tokyo Majin Gakuen Kenpucho: Tou 2nd Act
- Tokyo Ghoul
- We Without Wings: Under the Innocent Sky
- Sengoku Night Blood
- Seven Deadly Sins

== See also ==
- List of Marvelous Entertainment games
