= Valhalla Knights 3 =

2013 video game

- North American boxart
- Developer: K2 LLC
- Publishers: JP: Marvelous AQL; NA: XSEED Games
- Composer: Motoi Sakuraba
- Series: Valhalla Knights
- Engine: Orochi 3
- Platform: PlayStation Vita
- Release: Valhalla Knights: JP: May 23, 2013; NA: October 15, 2013; EU: October 23, 2013; Valhalla Knights Gold: JP: February 27, 2014
- Genre: RPG
- Modes: Single-player, multiplayer

Valhalla Knights 3 (Japanese: ヴァルハラナイツ3) is a role-playing video game for the PlayStation Vita published by Marvelous AQL. It is the sequel to Valhalla Knights 2 and is the fourth game in the Valhalla Knights video game series. The game was originally planned to be released in Japan on January 31, 2013, but was delayed, and eventually was released on May 23, 2013. XSEED Games published the game in North America on October 15, 2013, and Europe on October 23, 2013. An enhanced version of the game titled Valhalla Knights 3 Gold (ヴァルハラナイツ3 Gold) was released in Japan on February 27, 2014; however, XSEED Games announced that they have no plans to release Gold in other regions.

== Gameplay ==
The player creates a battle team and then can challenge other players in a 7-on-7 battle. The game features seven character races, which are Human, Elf, Hobbit, Dwarf, Nightmare, Beast and Machine, and seven character classes, which are Fighter, Mage, Prisoner, Thief, Priest, Akatoki, and Archer. Each character also has eight "active" skills and four "passive" skills, the skills depending on the character type. Additionally, there are also different personality traits, which are given at random to a character. The character's personality influences their behavior. By winning, the player obtains arena points which can be used to buy weapons and armor. The game also features a "red light district" where the player can recruit female party members by paying them then raising their affection, as well as trigger side-quests. The player must also earn skill points, which are necessary to upgrade and unlock abilities for his/her team.

Valhalla Knights 3 uses real-time battle system which allows the player-controlled protagonist to instruct other characters. Enemy leaders are also in charge of ordering their party; thus if the player takes down the leader the other enemies will become easier to kill. However, less experience is gained that way. In XSEED Games' version, online multiplayer is supported (as opposed to the ad-hoc connectivity of the original release); the gameplay has also been made easier. The game also features downloadable content, including character costumes from the No-Rin anime and light novel series.

== Plot ==
The protagonist of the game comes from a far-away place in search of a legendary treasure left behind by a spy charged with treason. The player can choose between one of four races in the very begin either as a human, elf, halfling or a dwarf. After you roll through the opening cinematic you are shown a scene of your character along six other prisoners arrive at the Plaza of Carceron prison. You and the group enter the High Town of the game only to be attack by other prisoners of the prison that work for one of the main families in charge of the prison. You and your fellow spy by the name of Carlos. You are both tasked to locate a great treasure hidden somewhere in the prison called "W. Flockhart's" treasure by order of the emperor though your character has not chose but to obey. You are branded with the "Mark of Death" which will activate if the branded fights against the will of the brander. You and Carlos soon find Paul another spy to assist in helping you find the treasure. With the aid of some of the other NPC's within the game your character will progress on until you find the door to the treasure or so you would think. Carlos is in truth a double agent of a higher authority and finds the shrine leading to the treasure. Your character along with Paul and all spies for the empire are labeled traitors by the rest of the prison. Your character is then tasked to assassinate the leaders of the families in the prison and one by one you succeed until you meet the head of the Bartess Family. Your character decides not to kill him and the mark activates nearly killing you. You are saved by the very man you tried to kill and told to find the wizard who created the mark. You do and through battle you absorb the soul of an ancient dragon thus breaking the curse on your soul. You become the prisons most wanted and are forced to kill many of your former friends leading up to the Coup to take the emperor's life. The game also features numerous side-quests which the player can attempt, including escort missions.

== Reception and sales ==
Valhalla Knights 3 has received mixed reviews. It currently holds a score of 47.50% on GameRankings and 48/100 on Metacritic. Four Famitsu reviewers gave Valhalla Knights 3 scores of 8, 7, 7 and 8, for a total of 30/40. Destructoid rated the game a 4.5/10, saying that Valhalla Knights 3 "has some high points, but they soon give way to glaring faults." Pocket Gamer rated the game a 7/10, praising the RPG aspects of the game, calling it "a strong and compelling RPG hidden under mountains of fan service." Hardcore Gamer scored Valhalla Knights 3 a 3.5/5, commending the customization options and online features, but the presentation, graphics, load times and story were criticized. Game Revolution awarded the game 2.5/5, praising the concept and multiplayer, but criticizing the presentation and single-player mode.

As of May 27, 2013, 65,000 copies have been sold, making it the best debut in the Valhalla Knights series so far.

Reception

Aggregate score
Aggregator	Score
Metacritic	48/100

Review scores
Publication	Score
Destructoid	4.5/10
Famitsu	30/40
GameRevolution	5/10
GameSpot	3/10
GamesRadar+	2.5/5
Hardcore Gamer	3.5/5
IGN	5.8/10
Pocket Gamer	3.5/5
Push Square	4/10
RPGamer	1/5
RPGFan	30/100
