= Rising Star Games =

British video game publisher

- Type: Subsidiary
- Industry: Video games
- Founded: 10 July 2004; 22 years ago
- Founder: Martin Defries
- Headquarters: Luton, Bedfordshire, England
- Key people: Ed Valiente (managing director)
- Products: No More Heroes; Harvest Moon DS; Rune Factory: A Fantasy Harvest Moon; Bomberman Land Touch; Deadly Premonition; Little King's Story
- Parent: Bergsala (50%, 2005-2018); Marvelous Entertainment (50%, 2005-2010); Intergrow (50%, 2010-2018); Thunderful Group (2018–present)
- Website: thunderfulgames.com

Rising Star Games was a British video game publisher founded in 2004 to publish localised Japanese titles to the European market. Originally a joint venture between Bergsala and Marvelous Entertainment, it became a subsidiary of Thunderful Group in 2018.

== History ==
Rising Star Games was founded on 10 July 2004 by Martin Defries as a joint venture between Bergsala Holding and Japanese publisher Marvelous Entertainment. Marvelous Entertainment sold its 50% share in Rising Star Games to Intergrow, another Japanese publisher, in January 2010. Rising Star Games opened a United States office based in California in January 2012. The company had an exclusive licensing agreement with Marvelous and used Xseed Games English localizations, but it did not extend to North America. Thunderful acquired Rising Star Games from Bergsala Holding in July 2018, at which point Ed Valiente became its managing director and Defries left the company.

The last game released under the Rising Star Games banner was the Windows version of Deadly Premonition 2: A Blessing in Disguise, released in July 2022. The Rising Star Games Limited company as a whole was renamed to Thunderful Games Limited in September 2023.

== Games ==
Title	Year released	Platform(s)
Harvest Moon: One World	2021	Microsoft Windows, Nintendo Switch, PlayStation 4, Xbox One
Deadly Premonition 2: A Blessing in Disguise	2020	Microsoft Windows, Nintendo Switch
Giga Wrecker Alt.	2019	Microsoft Windows, Nintendo Switch, PlayStation 4, Xbox One
Rico	2019	Microsoft Windows, Nintendo Switch, PlayStation 4, Xbox One
Trailblazers	2018	Microsoft Windows, Nintendo Switch, PlayStation 4, Xbox One
Decay of Logos	2018	Microsoft Windows, Nintendo Switch, PlayStation 4, Xbox One
SteamWorld Dig 2	2018	Nintendo Switch, PlayStation 4
88 Heroes: 98 Heroes Edition	2017	Nintendo Switch, Nintendo 3DS
88 Heroes	2017	PlayStation 4, Xbox One
Giga Wrecker	2017	Microsoft Windows
Conga Master Party	2017	Nintendo Switch
Conga Master	2017	Microsoft Windows, PlayStation 4, Xbox One
Ninja Shodown	2017	Microsoft Windows, PlayStation 4, Xbox One, Nintendo Switch
Superbeat Xonic EX	2017	PlayStation 4, Xbox One, Nintendo Switch
A Pixel Story	2017	PlayStation 4, Xbox One
Earth's Dawn	2016	Microsoft Windows, PlayStation 4, Xbox One
Shantae and the Pirate's Curse	2016	Nintendo 3DS
Zombie Vikings: Ragnarök Edition	2016	PlayStation 4
Lumo	2016	Microsoft Windows, Linux, Mac OS, PlayStation 4, PlayStation Vita, Xbox One, Nintendo Switch
I Want To Be Human	2016	Microsoft Windows, PlayStation 4, Xbox One
Fist Slash: Of Ultimate Fury	2015	Microsoft Windows
Hello Kitty: Rockin' World Tour	2015	Nintendo 3DS
Poncho	2015	Microsoft Windows, PlayStation 4
Superbeat Xonic	2015	PlayStation Vita
One Upon Light	2015	PlayStation 4
Harvest Moon: The Lost Valley	2015	Nintendo 3DS
Lumini	2015	Microsoft Windows
La-Mulana EX	2015	PlayStation Vita
Tulpa	2015	Microsoft Windows, Linux, Mac OS
Ratz Instagib	2015	Microsoft Windows
The Marvellous Miss Take	2014	Microsoft Windows, Mac OS
Kromaia	2014	Microsoft Windows, PlayStation 4
TRI: Of Friendship and Madness	2014	Microsoft Windows, Linux, Mac OS
Sorcery Saga: Curse of the Great Curry God	2014	PlayStation Vita
Hometown Story	2014	Nintendo 3DS
Cloudbuilt	2014	Microsoft Windows
Hakuoki: Memories of the Shinsengumi	2013	Nintendo 3DS
Deadly Premonition: The Director's Cut	2013	PlayStation 3, Microsoft Windows
Beyblade: Evolution	2013	Nintendo 3DS
Around the World with Hello Kitty & Friends	2013	Nintendo 3DS
Super Black Bass 3D	2013	Nintendo 3DS
Girls' Fashion Shoot	2013	Nintendo 3DS
Virtue's Last Reward	2012	Nintendo 3DS, PlayStation Vita
Under Defeat HD Deluxe Edition	2012	Xbox 360, PlayStation 3
Jewel Master: Cradle of Egypt 2	2012	Nintendo DS
Shifting World	2012	Nintendo 3DS
Harvest Moon: The Tale of Two Towns	2012	Nintendo 3DS, Nintendo DS
To-Fu Collection	2012	Nintendo DS
Blazing Souls Accelate	2012	PlayStation Portable
Rune Factory Oceans	2012	PlayStation 3
Akai Katana	2012	Xbox 360
Cradle of Rome 2	2012	Nintendo 3DS
Bit.Trip Saga	2012	Nintendo 3DS
Bit.Trip Complete	2012	Wii
Cradle of Persia	2012	Nintendo DS
The King of Fighters XIII	2011	Xbox 360, PlayStation 3
DoDonPachi Resurrection	2011	Xbox 360
Cradle of Rome 2	2011	Nintendo DS
Rune Factory 3: A Fantasy Harvest Moon	2011	Nintendo DS
Harvest Moon DS: Grand Bazaar	2011	Nintendo DS
Loving Life with Hello Kitty and Friends	2011	Nintendo DS
Jewel Legends: Tree of Life	2011	Nintendo DS
Pucca Power Up	2011	Nintendo DS
Cradle of Rome and Cradle of Egypt Double Pack	2011	Nintendo DS
Deathsmiles	2011	Xbox 360
Avalon Code	2010	Nintendo DS
Deadly Premonition	2010	Xbox 360
Eldar Saga	2010	Wii
Ivy the Kiwi?	2010	Wii, Nintendo DS
Rune Factory 2: A Fantasy Harvest Moon	2010	Nintendo DS
Pang: Magical Michael	2010	Nintendo DS
Jewel Master: Cradle of Egypt	2010	Nintendo DS
No More Heroes 2: Desperate Struggle	2010	Wii
Rune Factory Frontier	2010	Wii
Fragile Dreams: Farewell Ruins of the Moon	2010	Wii
Steal Princess	2010	Nintendo DS
Way of the Samurai 3	2010	Xbox 360, PlayStation 3
Half-Minute Hero	2010	PlayStation Portable
Animal Kororo	2010	Nintendo DS
Muramasa: The Demon Blade	2009	Wii
Harvest Moon: Tree of Tranquility	2009	Wii
Animal Kororo	2009	Nintendo DS
Rygar: The Battle of Argus	2009	Wii
Valhalla Knights 2	2009	PlayStation Portable
Angel Cat Sugar	2009	Nintendo DS
Lux-Pain	2009	Nintendo DS
Little King's Story	2009	Wii
Populous DS	2009	Nintendo DS
Rune Factory: A Fantasy Harvest Moon	2009	Nintendo DS
XG Blast!	2009	Nintendo DS
Colour Cross	2008	Nintendo DS
Jewel Master: Cradle of Rome	2008	Nintendo DS
Dungeon Maker	2008	PlayStation Portable
Flower, Sun, and Rain	2008	Nintendo DS
R-Type Tactics	2008	PlayStation Portable
Baroque	2008	PlayStation 2, Wii
Bakushow	2008	Nintendo DS
Growlanser: Heritage of War	2008	PlayStation 2
Ecolis - Save the Forest	2008	Nintendo DS
Dungeon Explorer: Warriors of Ancient Arts	2008	Nintendo DS, PlayStation Portable
Bomberman Land	2008	Wii
No More Heroes	2008	Wii
Harvest Moon: Magical Melody	2008	Wii
Bomberman Land Touch! 2	2008	Nintendo DS
Bomberman Story DS	2007	Nintendo DS
Dungeon Maker	2007	Nintendo DS
Honeycomb Beat	2007	Nintendo DS
Luminous Arc	2007	Nintendo DS
Valhalla Knights	2007	PlayStation Portable
Super Swing Golf	2007	Wii
Harvest Moon: Innocent Life	2007	PlayStation Portable
Harvest Moon DS	2007	Nintendo DS
Bubble Bobble Double Shot	2007	Nintendo DS
Rainbow Islands Evolution	2007	PlayStation Portable
Bomberman Land Touch!	2007	Nintendo DS
Contact	2007	Nintendo DS
New Zealand Story Revolution	2007	Nintendo DS
Ys Strategy	2006	Nintendo DS
Space Invaders Evolution	2006	PlayStation Portable
Pilot Academy	2006	PlayStation Portable
Bubble Bobble Evolution	2006	PlayStation Portable
Swords of Destiny	2006	PlayStation 2
SBK: Snowboard Kids	2006	Nintendo DS
Lunar Genesis	2006	Nintendo DS
Bubble Bobble Revolution	2005	Nintendo DS
Space Invaders Revolution	2005	Nintendo DS
