= Pucca =

South Korean media franchise

- Created by: Young-Wook Ban
- Original work: Pucca e-cards
- Owners: Tiger Studio Co., Ltd.

Print publications
- Book: List of Pucca books

Films and television
- Television series: Pucca (2006); Pucca: Love Recipe
- Web series: Pucca Funny Love

Theatrical presentations
- Musical: Pucca en Vivo

Games
- Video game: Pucca Power Up (2011) Pucca's Race for Kisses (2011) Pucca Puzzle Adventure Pucca Heroes Pucca Wars

Miscellaneous
- Theme park attraction: Wa! Pucca!

Pucca (/ˈpʊkə/; Korean: 뿌까 [p͈uk͈a]) is a South Korean media franchise from the South Korean company Vooz. The titular protagonist, Pucca, is the niece of three Korean men who run a noodle restaurant called Goh-Rong in Sooga Village, a small village in the mountains. Pucca is also in love with the ninja Garu (가루 [kaɾu]), and Pucca always seems to beat him in combat and unintentional competition simply by sheer will. Pucca began in January 2000 with Flash-animated e-cards, and has since focused on the character goods business.

== History ==
Pucca was originally an "animated, online E-card service" made in 2000 by the company, VOOZ. The original service for the E-cards was the Korean e-card service postnut.com. The popularity of the E-card increased so rapidly in various Asian countries that it was licensed by Jetix Europe in 2004, who also acquired television rights for the service. VOOZ went on to continue working with Jetix Europe, making the original two and a half minute long animated shorts, which were then aired on both the Jetix website and as in-between full cartoon show shorts on the Jetix television channel. Pucca shorts were also often featured on the channel for MTV. Jetix Europe's director of international licensing, Richard Woolf, stated that "the possibilities with Pucca were immediately apparent, especially because you were left wanting more after watching the original shorts".

More episodes were ordered by Jetix Europe after the success of the initial shorts, with Studio B Productions in charge of making them. The new episodes became more fleshed out to depict Pucca as being a real television series, with more extensive plot being involved and some of the non-speaking characters gaining voices, along with the length of the episodes being extended to seven minutes in total. The new episodes were shown on many of Jetix's worldwide channels.

After the success of the TV show, Jetix began branching out into accessories and toys in order to bring in further revenue from the new franchise. These new products included "apparel, accessories, housewares, giftware, and stationery" focused largely on attracting younger teenagers. Since then, the age demographic has expanded to include younger children through the creation of various toy lines and older teenagers through the publishing of video games set in the Pucca universe.

=== Licensing ===
In 2008, Pucca was licensed out to the Access Licensing Group that involved a "merchandising license agreement in North America". This would allow the ALG to begin making Pucca products for sale in the US, and it was presumed that Pucca would act as a challenge to The Walt Disney Company. Ironically enough, the televised adaptation aired on Toon Disney's subsidiary network, Jetix.

Pucca was also licensed out to Warner Bros. Consumer Products in 2009. Utilizing this, WBCP started a promotional activity on Valentine's Day in France and Italy, where "flowers and Pucca press packs were sent to key journalists". A greater amount of advertising has also been started throughout the regions at various trade shows and there are currently plans to expand this to include shows in Germany and Spain.

Advertising in magazines has also become more prolific through WBCP, with a "full-page Pucca ad published in Italian Vanity Fair". Despite giving away Pucca toys through Burger King and other efforts, the market for Pucca items has been slow to advance in the UK, but has been placed under a "period of intensive consumer research that will determine the long-term marketing strategy for the brand" both there and in other markets that have been slow to accept the Pucca franchise.

=== Fashion ===
Warner Bros. Consumer Products also exhibited Pucca merchandise during the 2010 New York Fashion Week. Titled the PUCCA Capsule Collection, it was revealed at Curve Boutique on Robertson Boulevard in Los Angeles. A number of Hollywood celebrities were in attendance for the show, along with the founder of Pucca, Boo Kyoung Kim. A number of different designs from various high-profile fashion designers were exhibited at the showing for the PUCCA Capsule Collection.

A new clothing brand, titled "EXR Loves Pucca", has started in Korea. The Wonder Girls are acting as models for the brand, which will also involve 17 other fashionistas that will be designing the clothing line. The line is a collaboration project between the Pucca franchise and the Korean clothing company EXR.

== Animation ==
=== Flash animation ===
In the initial period, Pucca was an online animated series made with Macromedia Flash by original company Vooz. Many of its greeting cards and silent Flash episodes center around Pucca's comical attempts to steal a kiss from Garu and the usual competition between them. In March 2004, Jetix Europe acquired the series' television and home video rights for Europe and the Middle East.

No.	Title	Short summary
1	"Present"	What Pucca wants for Christmas? When Santa finds out, he has a mission to kidnap Garu.
2	"Fight on the Boat"	A group of ninjas try to sneak up on Garu's boat, but he was prepared for that... but was he prepared for the mysterious ninja that wants to kiss him?
3	"Contact"	A retelling of Pucca and Garu's first meeting. After failing to kiss him using ice cream, Pucca uses an arrow that belongs to Cupid in order to steal the ninja's heart. Unfortunately, it ends up hitting Garu's pet cat, Mio, instead.
4	"Wanted" / "Defence"	Wanted: Pucca makes multiple wanted posters with Garu on it, much to his dismay. Defense: Pucca struggles in her snack with a meddling fly and a hungry Garu.
5	"Mission"	Pucca tasks Mio to deliver a bon-bon to Garu, but the cat finds himself stalked by the trio of feline thieves!
6	"Papero-Day" / "Take My Heart"	Papero-Day: Pucca uses paperos to shoot an apple in Garu's head a-la William Tell. Take My Heart: Pucca gives Valentine's Day candy to Garu, but is tricked when she tries to get a kiss out of him as well.
7	"Dream" / "Harvest"	Dream: Has Garu finally fell in love with Pucca? Or is there something fishy with reality? Harvest: Garu is collecting fruits from the trees, but is surprised when he finds out that he's not alone.
8	"In the Bamboo Fields" / "Mistake"	In the Bamboo Fields: In the middle of a fog forest, Garu comes across a very dangerous sight: a bathing Pucca. Mistake: Garu's ninja slicing skills prove to be too effective when Pucca decides to help.
9	"Garu's Other" / "Contact #2"	Garu's Other: Garu tries to use shadow clones in order to fool Pucca. Contact #2: Unable to keep up with Garu's speed, Pucca has a plan to catch him off guard.
10	"Mission #2"	Garu needs to deliver a scroll, but between being attacked by ninjas and chased by Pucca, he finds his mission harder than he had anticipated.
11	"White Day" / "Swing"	White Day: Pucca asks for a White Day gift from Garu, but will it be what she expects? Swing: Pucca tries to kiss Garu and play on a swingset at the same time.
12	"Summer Story"	In a summer afternoon, Garu finds himself captured by a mermaid Pucca.
13	"The Rival"	Pucca gets in the middle of a fight between Garu and his longtime rival, Tobe.
14	"Caughting in the Rain"	Garu enters a haunted house in order to escape the rain, but finds something (or someone) that's much scarier than Pucca inside.
15	"Hottest Fighter ABYO"	Abyo is a young kung-fu master whose behaviour parodies action movie stars like Bruce Lee and Jackie Chan. Are his skills good enough to break up Pucca and Garu?
16	"The Ring" / "Look at Me"	The Ring: Garu makes a ring for Pucca out of his own sword, but is surprised when she doesn't take good care of it. Look at Me: Pucca tries to get Garu's attention by dressing up as multiple pop culture characters at once.
17	"The Frog Prince" / "I Will Protect"	The Frog Prince: Pucca becomes enchanted with The Frog Prince story, so she sets out to find a frog to kiss and reveal her loved one. I Will Protect: Garu finds himself at mercy of both Pucca and a mosquito.
18	"The Constellation of Love" / "Angel PUCCA"	The Constellation of Love: Do you know how constellations are made? Pucca and Garu will show how! Angel PUCCA: Pucca takes the form of a cupid and tries to shoot an arrow on Garu, but it backfires quickly.
19	"X-mas (1&2)"	In two different Christmas stories, Pucca wants to decorate a tree and sell candles for Santa.
20	"2004 Blackday" / "Pu Kong"	2004 Blackday: Not even in a Black Day play Garu can take a break from Pucca's kisses. Pu Kong: Garu the tiger thinks that he's invincible, but that's because he never met Pucca the monkey!
21	"Bungee Jump"	Garu is experiencing a bungee jumping practice, but Pucca gets in the way yet again.
22	"The Opening Ceremony"	A flashback of when Pucca and her uncles first moved to Sooga Village and opened their restaurant, Goh-Rong.
23	"Photo Day" / "Don't Look Back"	Photo Day: Pucca wants a romantic photo with Garu, but all of their friends get in her way! Don't Look Back : Garu feels like he's being stalked in the middle of the night, but by whom?
24	"Flower Delivery" / "Music Box"	Flower Delivery: Garu tries to deliver a flower to Pucca, but things don't go as planned. Music Box: Garu receives a strange gift: a music box with him and Pucca kissing?

== TV series ==
Two animated adaptations were made for the franchise – one simply called Pucca, and the other subtitled Love Recipe. The first series featured Tabitha St. Germain as Pucca, Brian Drummond as Garu, among several other Canadian voice actors. The second series had an American dub instead, with Pucca and Garu's voices remaining unchanged as they rarely speak.

== DVD releases ==
Title	Label	Release date
Pucca: Funny Love	Pinnacle Vision	2 July 2007

== Books ==
Title	Publisher	First Released
Pucca's Most Wanted	Vooz	18 November 2004
Pucca and Garu: First Meeting	Vooz	18 November 2004
Pucca: Hands Off My Dumplings!	Vooz	19 May 2005
Pucca's Fishy Tail	Vooz	19 May 2005

=== Photo Frame books ===
Title	Publisher	First Released
Pucca Photo Frame Book 1: Various Kissin' Ways	Vooz	13 January 2005
Pucca Photo Frame Book 2: Making Sweet Music	Vooz	13 January 2005

=== Key Chain books ===
Title	Publisher	First Released
Chopstick Dance with Pucca	Vooz	17 March 2005
Ninja Training with Garu	Vooz	17 March 2005

== Video games ==
There is a WiiWare game called Pucca's Kisses Game, which is an action-platformer about Pucca trying to chase Garu around perilous levels and obstacles just to catch Garu and kiss him. This game was developed by Otaboo, and was published by BigBen Interactive. Pucca's Kisses Game was released in Europe and Australia on February 4, 2011, and in North America on February 14, 2011, for 800 Wii Points. On February 14, 2011, the game was re-released in Europe as a retail disc entitled Pucca's Race for Kisses for the Wii.

A Nintendo DS video game titled Pucca Power Up was released by Rising Star Games on May 13, 2011. It was made with a partnership between the pre-mentioned game company and the franchise' creator, Vooz. Later, Rising Star Games announced that the release would be for the entire PAL region, with the game arriving in the United Kingdom first. The game was released in Europe on May 13, 2011, and in North America the same year on September 13.
