= Cloudbuilt =

2014 action video game

- Developer: Coilworks
- Publisher: Rising Star Games
- Platform: Microsoft Windows
- Release: WW: 20 March 2014
- Genres: Action, platform
- Mode: Single-player

Cloudbuilt is an action game developed by Swedish indie studio Coilworks and published by Rising Star Games for Windows in 2014. The Through the Fog downloadable content (DLC) was released on Steam on 7 July 2014, and the Defiance DLC was released on 21 November 2014. An enhanced version, titled Super Cloudbuilt, was released on the PS4, Xbox One, and PC in 2017.

== Gameplay ==
Cloudbuilt is an indie speedrunning game. Part parkour, part shooter, it is very fast-paced with high difficulty and an emphasis on acrobatic control. The core concepts of the game are path exploration and speed. Each level has a central path which is easier than the fastest path which requires much faster reflexes and planning.

The game features 22 zones in the original game and Through the Fog free downloadable content (DLC). An additional five more zones were added in the Defiance DLC. The in-game worldwide leaderboards actively show the current fast time on the game levels.

== Plot ==
The game's story follows Demi, a young girl who was critically injured in a war and is in recovery and mental rehabilitation. In her comatose state, she is able to explore a new world with her rocket-powered Exoskeleton and energy gun. Demi's experiences are her ways of learning and coping with her new physical and mental changes.

== Reception ==
Cloudbuilt received fairly positive or mixed reviews with an average Metacritic score of 72. Reviewing it for Rock, Paper, Shotgun, Ben Barrett had mixed reactions: "you'll need to judge whether the incredible style, absolutely extraordinary soundtrack and stellar highs are worth the lows that will make you want to snap your keyboard in half." Eurogamer scored it 8/10, summing up the experience thus: "Cloudbuilt succeeds remarkably in proving that how a game feels and what you do within it can tell stories all on their own."
