= Trailblazers (video game) =

2018 video game

- Steam cover art
- Developer: Supergonk
- Publisher: Rising Star Games
- Platforms: Microsoft Windows, PlayStation 4, Xbox One, Nintendo Switch
- Release: Windows, PlayStation 4; May 8, 2018; Xbox One; May 9, 2018; Nintendo Switch; May 15, 2018
- Genre: Racing
- Modes: Single-player, multiplayer

Trailblazers is a racing video game developed by British studio Supergonk and published by Rising Star Games for Microsoft Windows, PlayStation 4, Xbox One, and Nintendo Switch in May 2018.

== Gameplay ==
Trailblazers is a high-speed racing game that has been compared to games like Wipeout, F-Zero, and Splatoon. Players control one of eight different racers, with each racer's vehicle capable of painting their team's colour on the track, create boost pads for the team. Teams in each race can have up to three racers each.

== Development ==
Trailblazers was developed by Supergonk, a studio consisting of developers who had previously worked at studios like Codemasters, Bizarre Creations, and Lionhead Studios.

In May 2018, a trailer was released for the launch of the game.

== Reception ==
In a hands-on preview in March 2018, Blake Morse of Shacknews praised the visuals, comparing the graphics to Borderlands.

The Windows, PlayStation 4, and Xbox One versions of Trailblazers received "mixed or average" reviews, according to review aggregator Metacritic. Martin Robinson of Eurogamer criticized the game for its poor "energy".
