= Pilot Academy =

2006 video game

- Developer(s): Kuju Sheffield
- Publisher(s): EU: Rising Star Games; JP: Marvelous Interactive
- Platform(s): PlayStation Portable
- Release: JP: September 7, 2006; EU: October 27, 2006
- Genre(s): Amateur flight simulator
- Mode(s): Single-player, multiplayer

Pilot Academy is a flight simulator video game released for the PlayStation Portable in 2006.

== Gameplay ==
The game allows the player to operate aircraft from different eras, from World War I to the present day. The game has two major classes, Civilian and Military, and each has different missions. For the first few major civilian lessons (taking off, turning, etc.), the player controls a Cessna light aircraft, but after completion of the first lessons, moves on to control a Global Express business jet and a Boeing 747. The military lessons do not involve the basic skills of flying, instead they focus on weapon control.

== Graphics ==
The game is rendered in 3D, but with insignificant buildings in 2D. All of the aircraft are detailed with logos and artwork, with real movements such as a visible rudder movement when the rudder is activated, and the full movement of the landing gear while extending and retracting. There is no visible damage, however.

The game uses only three different maps, but with each mission decorating each map differently and using a different part of the 64 square km map. The three maps are a pacific island area map where most of it is water; a grassland map with extensive snow-covered mountains; and a desert map. Only the map with the islands is playable in Free flight mode.

The aircraft in the game are all renditions of actual aircraft. All have different acceleration, climb capability and response to control inputs.

== Reception ==
The game scored 67/100 on Metacritic. Pilot Academy was predominantly criticised for a lack of excitement and personality.
