= Lumo (video game) =

2016 puzzle video game

- Developers: Triple Eh? Ltd (Windows); Just Add Water Ltd (Console)
- Publisher: Rising Star Games
- Platforms: Microsoft Windows; PlayStation 4; PlayStation Vita; Xbox One; Nintendo Switch; Linux; macOS
- Release: Microsoft Windows, PlayStation 4; May 24, 2016; Xbox One; June 22, 2016; PlayStation Vita; July 5, 2016; Nintendo Switch; October 27, 2017
- Genre: Puzzle-platformer
- Mode: Single-player

Lumo is a 3D isometric puzzle-platformer developed by Triple Eh? Ltd. It was released for PlayStation 4, PlayStation Vita, Microsoft Windows and Xbox One in 2016 and for the Nintendo Switch in 2017.

== Gameplay ==
In Lumo, the player completes a series of puzzles in over 400 rooms to complete the game. The game places a heavy emphasis on exploration and discovering secrets and contains multiple hidden challenges and minigames.

== Soundtrack ==
The soundtrack for Lumo was produced by artist Phil Nixon under the name Dopedemand and was released on Bandcamp in 2014, almost 2 years before the game itself was initially released. The soundtrack contains 21 tracks, although one of them was not used in the game itself.

== Reception ==
Reception

Aggregate score
Aggregator	Score
Metacritic	(PC) 77/100 (PS4) 73/100 (XONE) 73/100 (NS) 77/100

Review scores
Publication	Score
Eurogamer	Recommended
GameRevolution	8/10
Hardcore Gamer	4/5
Nintendo Life	8/10
Nintendo World Report	8.5/10
PC Gamer (US)	75/100
Push Square	8/10
VideoGamer.com	7/10

Lumo received "generally favorable" reviews for Microsoft Windows and Nintendo Switch and received "mixed or average" reviews for PlayStation 4 and Xbox One.

== Sequel ==
A sequel, Lumo 2 was released on October 17, 2025 for PC, Switch, PlayStation 5 and Xbox.
