= Valhalla Knights: Eldar Saga =

2009 video game

- Developer: K2
- Publishers: JP: Marvelous Entertainment; NA: Xseed Games; EU: Rising Star Games
- Directors: Mitsuo Kodama; Toru Okazawa
- Producers: Yoshihisa Ohbuchi; Haruyasu Akagi
- Designers: Hiroko Sekine; Hiromichi Baba
- Programmers: Osamu Matsuki; Takahiro Inoue; Kanako Iida; Jawaharlal Bazar; Masakazu Doi
- Writers: Katsuhiro Mutsuyasu; Kotoka Furukubo; Yukihiro Maeyama
- Composer: Motoi Sakuraba
- Series: Valhalla Knights
- Platform: Wii
- Release: NA: September 29, 2009; JP: October 8, 2009; EU: September 17, 2010
- Genre: Action role-playing
- Modes: Single-player, multiplayer

Valhalla Knights: Eldar Saga (ヴァルハラナイツ エルダールサーガ), known in Europe as Eldar Saga, is an action role-playing game developed by K2 and released for the Wii. It is the third installment of the Valhalla Knights series. Valhalla Knights: Eldar Saga was released on September 29, 2009 in North America, October 8 in Japan and September 17, 2010 in Europe.

== Reception ==
Valhalla Knights: Eldar Saga received generally unfavorable reviews according to review aggregator Metacritic.

Reception

Aggregate score
Aggregator	Score
Metacritic	35/100

Review scores
Publication	Score
GameRevolution	1/10
GameSpot	2.5/10
GamesRadar+	1.5/5
Hardcore Gamer	1.5/5
IGN	4.5/10
RPGamer	1.5/5
RPGFan	64/100
