= Pucca (TV series) =

Canadian-South Korean animated television series

- Genre: Action-adventure; Martial arts; Slapstick comedy
- Created by: Boo Kyoung Kim; Calvin Kim
- Directed by: Greg Sullivan (seasons 1–2); Joon Won Lee (season 3)
- Voices of: Seasons 1–2: Tabitha St. Germain; Brian Drummond; Chantal Strand; Lee Tockar; Season 3 (Love Recipe): Jeonghwa Yang; Shin Yong-woo; Beom-gi Hong (Korean version); Park Si-yoon (Korean version); Doug Erholtz (English version); Melissa Fahn (English version)
- Theme music composer: Plus-Tech Squeeze Box (seasons 1–2); Yoon Joo-Hyeon, Kim-wook (Love Recipe)
- Opening theme: "Pucca Funny Love" (seasons 1–2) "Love Recipe" (season 3)
- Ending theme: "Pucca Funny Love" (Extended) (seasons 1–2) "Pucca's Sweet Love" (season 3)
- Composer: Hal Beckett
- Countries of origin: Canada (2006–08); South Korea (2018–19)
- Original languages: English (entire run); Korean (season 3)
- No. of seasons: 3
- No. of episodes: 65 (191 segments) (list of episodes)

Production
- Executive producers: Chris Bartleman; Blair Peters; Michael Lekes (season 1); Marc Buhaj (season 2); Yong Wook Kim (season 3)
- Producers: Kirsten Newlands (season 1); Lori Lozinski (season 2); Byong Pil Kong (season 3)
- Running time: 21 minutes (7 minutes per segment; seasons 1–2, season 3 English version); 2 minutes (1 minute per segment; season 3 Korean version)
- Production companies: Studio B Productions (2006–08); Bazooka Studio (2018–19)

Original release
- Network: Toon Disney (Jetix)
- Release: 18 September 2006 – 11 August 2008
- Network: MBC TV
- Release: 10 December 2018 – 31 October 2019

Pucca (Korean: 짜장소녀 뿌까; RR: Jjajangsonyeo Ppukka) is an animated comedy television series based on a series of shorts created by the South Korean company VOOZ Character System. The series revolves around Pucca, a young girl who is in love and infatuated with a ninja named Garu. The series has aired on Champ TV and MBC TV in South Korea. The series has also aired on Toon Disney's Jetix block in the U.S., and on the international Jetix channels throughout Europe and Latin America. In Canada, the show had aired on Family Channel.

Pucca premiered in 2006, with a set of 26 episodes (78 segments). The second season of the show, consisting of 13 episodes (39 segments), began airing in 2008 after it was ordered to be created by Jetix Europe. In October 2018, a third season was announced by Planeta Junior, a company within Planeta Group. The third season aired in South Korea on 10 December 2018 on MBC TV, and 19 December 2018 on Tooniverse. It consists of 26 episodes (76 segments). The third season of Pucca, titled Pucca: Love Recipe in English, was released on Netflix on 31 December 2019, before being removed on 29 June 2023.

In total, not including the past online aired episodes of the show, this brought the number of created segments to 191. The main theme song is also sung in Korean.

== Summary ==
The series focuses on the adventures of a noodle delivery girl named Pucca, who typically does not speak. She works in a local restaurant called the Goh-Rong in her town called Sooga Village, owned by her three uncles where their main dish is Jajangmyeon noodles. Pucca is in love with a serious ninja-in-training named Garu, who values his own company and silence, often seeing moments in which Pucca chases Garu and tries to kiss him. Pucca is friends with Ching, an 11-year-old girl who practices Jian swordsmanship. She has a pet chicken named Won that always sits on her head and is in love with a boy named Abyo, who pays no attention to her and only has interests in Kung-Fu as well as impressing other girls.

In the third season, there is an overarching plot surrounding the rivalry between Goh-Rong and a new local restaurant titled Dong King Restaurant (which was originally titled to be BonaSera in the trailer). Ring Ring, a local 12-year-old fashion star – who appeared previously in the Jetix series and also grows a love interest to Garu – is also revealed to be the daughter of Dong King and works alongside him and his servants against Pucca and Goh-Rong.

== Episodes ==
Season	Segments	Episodes	Originally released		
Season	Segments	Episodes	First released	Last released	Network
1	78	26	September 18, 2006	May 14, 2007	Jetix; Family Channel
2	37	13	March 3, 2008	August 11, 2008	Jetix; Family Channel
3	76	26	December 10, 2018	October 31, 2019	MBC

== Voice cast ==
=== Pucca (TV series) ===
- Tabitha St. Germain as:
  - Pucca, the titular protagonist who communicates with giggling instead of speaking. She's obsessively in love with Garu, who does not reciprocate at all.
  - Ring Ring, Pucca's short-tempered and vindictive rival and one of the major antagonists of the series who is shown to transform in anger whenever something doesn't go her way.
- Brian Drummond as Garu, the ninja warrior of Sooga Village whom Pucca loves. The two of them interact by screaming and laughing. He does not reciprocate Pucca's feelings at all, and is constantly terrified of her.
- Chantal Strand as Ching, Pucca's friend who manages Turtle Training Hall with her father.
- Lee Tockar as:
  - Abyo, an energetic and competitive, yet stubborn boy who is Garu's friend and sometimes rival.
  - Dada, a clumsy dishwasher and waiter at Goh-Rong Restaurant.
  - Tobe, one of the major antagonists of the series who has a rivalry with Garu.

=== Pucca: Love Recipe ===
==== Korean version ====
- Yang Jeong-hwa as Pucca (uncredited)
- Shin Yong-woo as Garu (uncredited)
- Hong Beom-gi as Abyo
- Park Si-yoon as Ching
- Kim Hyeon-ji as Ring Ring
- So Jung-hwan as Uncle Dumpling
- Lee Sang-ho as Ho
- Hong Seung-hyo as Linguini
- Park Seung-tae as Tobe
- Hyeon Gyeong-soo as Fyah
- Kim Shin-woo as Chang
- Kang Seong-woo as Bruce

==== English version ====
- Yang Jeong-hwa as Pucca (archived recordings; uncredited)
- Shin Yong-woo as Garu (archival recordings; uncredited)
- Doug Erholtz as Abyo
- Melissa Fahn as Ching
- Karen Strassman as Ring Ring
- Kirk Thornton as Uncle Dumpling and Bruce
- Spike Spencer as Ho, Cassano, and Santa Claus
- Steve Canden as Linguini and Fyah
- Ben Pronsky as Tobe, Ayo, and Dandy
- Stephanie Sheh as Granny and Panky
- Todd Haberkorn as Chang and Dada
- Tony Azzolino as Ssoso
- Michael Sorich as Dong King, Jin, and Siva

== Telecast and home media ==
Pucca has aired on Champ TV and MBC TV in Korea. The series has also aired on Toon Disney's Jetix block in the U.S., and on the international Jetix channels throughout Europe and Latin America. In Canada, the show has aired on Family Channel.

In July 2007, Jetix Europe signed a home video deal with Shout! Factory to release Pucca on Region 1 DVD.

All five releases featured episodes from the first season. The fifth and final volume, titled Sooga Super Squad, featured four segment-episodes from the second season.

Title	Episode count	Release date	Episodes include		
Title	Episode count	Region 1	Season	Ep#	Title
Ninjas Love Noodles	13	18 March 2008	1	1b	"Noodle Round the World"
Ninjas Love Noodles	13	18 March 2008	1	2b	"Chef Slump"
Ninjas Love Noodles	13	18 March 2008	1	11c	"Ninjitsu for Dummies"
Ninjas Love Noodles	13	18 March 2008	1	12a	"Misplaced Face"
Ninjas Love Noodles	13	18 March 2008	1	13b	"Noodle to the Stars"
Ninjas Love Noodles	13	18 March 2008	1	15b	"Feud Fight"
Ninjas Love Noodles	13	18 March 2008	1	17c	"The Shirtless Avenger"
Ninjas Love Noodles	13	18 March 2008	1	18a	"And the Band Played Rong"
Ninjas Love Noodles	13	18 March 2008	1	18b	"Tobe's Nighttime Troubles"
Ninjas Love Noodles	13	18 March 2008	1	21b	"Ninja License"
Ninjas Love Noodles	13	18 March 2008	1	21c	"Four-Alarm Fire"
Ninjas Love Noodles	13	18 March 2008	1	23c	"Sooga Size Me"
Ninjas Love Noodles	13	18 March 2008	1	25b	"Woolen Warrior"
Kung Fu Kisses	13	18 March 2008	1	6c	"Slam Bam Birthday Bash"
Kung Fu Kisses	13	18 March 2008	1	7b	"Scenes from a Maul"
Kung Fu Kisses	13	18 March 2008	1	8a	"Dream On"
Kung Fu Kisses	13	18 March 2008	1	11a	"Rootin' Tootin' Ninjas"
Kung Fu Kisses	13	18 March 2008	1	15a	"Matinee Mayhem"
Kung Fu Kisses	13	18 March 2008	1	15c	"Dance, Pucca, Dance"
Kung Fu Kisses	13	18 March 2008	1	16	"Evil Love"
Kung Fu Kisses	13	18 March 2008	1	16	"A Better Boyfriend"
Kung Fu Kisses	13	18 March 2008	1	16	"Prince Not So Charming"
Kung Fu Kisses	13	18 March 2008	1	17a	"A Leg Up"
Kung Fu Kisses	13	18 March 2008	1	22a	"The Ring Ring Touch"
Kung Fu Kisses	13	18 March 2008	1	24a	"Little Miss Sooga"
Kung Fu Kisses	13	18 March 2008	1	26a	"Soap Opera"
Spooky Sooga Village	11	16 September 2008	1	1a	"Funny Love Eruption"
Spooky Sooga Village	11	16 September 2008	1	2a	"A Force of Won"
Spooky Sooga Village	11	16 September 2008	1	3a	"The Cursed Tie"
Spooky Sooga Village	11	16 September 2008	1	5	"Them Bones"
Spooky Sooga Village	11	16 September 2008	1	5	"Ghost of a Kiss"
Spooky Sooga Village	11	16 September 2008	1	5	"The Usual Ching"
Spooky Sooga Village	11	16 September 2008	1	9a	"Invisible Trouble"
Spooky Sooga Village	11	16 September 2008	1	9b	"High Voltage Ninjas"
Spooky Sooga Village	11	16 September 2008	1	14a	"Ninjasaurus"
Spooky Sooga Village	11	16 September 2008	1	14b	"Unfortunate Cookies"
Spooky Sooga Village	11	16 September 2008	1	23a	"Itsy Bitsy Enemy Within"
Secret Samurai Santa	10	28 October 2008	1	6b	"Snow Ninjas"
Secret Samurai Santa	10	28 October 2008	1	10	"Tis the Season for Revenge"
Secret Samurai Santa	10	28 October 2008	1	10	"Northern Lights Out"
Secret Samurai Santa	10	28 October 2008	1	10	"Secret Santa"
Secret Samurai Santa	10	28 October 2008	1	12b	"Swiss Kiss"
Secret Samurai Santa	10	28 October 2008	1	13a	"No Year's Eve"
Secret Samurai Santa	10	28 October 2008	1	14c	"On Thin Ice"
Secret Samurai Santa	10	28 October 2008	1	19b	"Lumberjacked"
Secret Samurai Santa	10	28 October 2008	1	23b	"Puccahontas"
Secret Samurai Santa	10	28 October 2008	1	25b	"Woolen Warrior"
Sooga Super Squad	13	3 March 2009	1	1c	"Ping Pong Pucca"
Sooga Super Squad	13	3 March 2009	1	4b	"Let's Go Fly a Ninja"
Sooga Super Squad	13	3 March 2009	1	7a	"The Sooga Showdown"
Sooga Super Squad	13	3 March 2009	1	7c	"Up from the Depths"
Sooga Super Squad	13	3 March 2009	1	17b	"Surf Ninjas"
Sooga Super Squad	13	3 March 2009	1	18c	"Datin' and Dumplins"
Sooga Super Squad	13	3 March 2009	1	19c	"Autograph This!"
Sooga Super Squad	13	3 March 2009	1	21a	"Tokyo a Go-Go"
Sooga Super Squad	13	3 March 2009	1	24b	"Gold Medal Garu"
Sooga Super Squad	13	3 March 2009	2	27b	"Knock It Off!"
Sooga Super Squad	13	3 March 2009	2	29b	"Invincible Vengeance"
Sooga Super Squad	13	3 March 2009	2	35b	"Striking Out"
Sooga Super Squad	13	3 March 2009	2	38c	"Super Sooga Squad"

== Awards ==
At the 2006 Annecy International Animated Film Festival, the Pucca episode "A Force of Won" was "nominated for two awards, including the Prix Jeunesse in the Animation category." During the same year, Pucca won the Leo Awards for best screenwriting, along with "best overall in an animation program".

== Music tour ==
A musical show for the series was held in Lima on 8 October 2009. This location was chosen because of Pucca being "one of the most beloved programs on Jetix's Latin American channel". The show repeated itself eight times from 8 to 11 October 2009.

== See also ==
- Pucca – information about the Pucca franchise in general
- Canimals – another animated television series created by Vooz
