= List of Pucca episodes =

Pucca is an animated series based on the original web shorts created by Boo Kyoung Kim and Calvin Kim from the South Korean company VOOZ Character System. The first two seasons were a co-production between VOOZ and Jetix Europe, animated in Flash by Canadian studio Studio B Productions and directed by Greg Sullivan. The third season is a co-production between VOOZ and the Planeta Group, and is animated in 3D-CGI animation.

== Series overview ==
Season	Segments	Episodes	Originally released		
Season	Segments	Episodes	First released	Last released	Network
1	78	26	September 18, 2006	May 14, 2007	Jetix; Family Channel
2	37	13	March 3, 2008	August 11, 2008	Jetix; Family Channel
3	76	26	December 10, 2018	October 31, 2019	MBC

== Episodes ==
=== Season 1 (2006–2007) ===
No. overall	No. in season	Title	Written by	Original release date
1a	1a	"Funny Love Eruption"	Written by : Jack Monaco; Storyboarded by : Lyn Hart	September 18, 2006
The Moon Cake Mountain Festival has come to Sooga Village, and the 3 chefs worked hard to make a mountain of moon cakes to offer to the volcano god so the volcano doesn't erupt and kill the villagers. However, when the silver moon topper to put on the moon cake mountain is broken because of Dada, Garu is sent to get another one before the volcano kills them all.
1b	1b	"Noodle Round the World"	Written by : Colin Yardley; Larry Raskin; Storyboarded by : Marlon Deane	September 18, 2006
After reading about an Italian chef who made the world's longest noodle, the 3 chefs decide to break that record, and entrust Garu to run around the world with the noodle they created. Tobe tries to humiliate Garu by stopping his attempts at breaking the record, but it did not happen on Pucca.
1c	1c	"Ping Pong Pucca"	Written by : Johnny John-John Kearns; Storyboarded by : Dan Hughes	September 18, 2006
Garu and Abyo team up in a ping pong tournament, defeating everyone they encounter. However, Tobe teams up with Muji, the ping pong champion, to go against them. After Abyo is eliminated, Pucca teams up with Garu to destroy the competition.
2a	2a	"A Force of Won"	Written by : Jack Alvino; Storyboarded by : Rob Boutilier	September 25, 2006
When Tobe discovers that Won can lay magical eggs that give immense power, he makes several attempts to get an egg. However, his plans are inadvertently thwarted by Pucca.
2b	2b	"Chef Slump"	Story by : Su Moon; Teleplay by : Jack Alvino; Storyboarded by : Kenny Park	September 25, 2006
The chefs lose their motivation to cook after an uneaten noodle is left in a bowl. Leaving the restaurant up to Pucca, they train to regain their culinary skills and honor. Meanwhile, Pucca struggles to maintain the restaurant. Later, it is revealed that Dada took the plate from the customer before he finished eating, making the chefs realized that all this was in vain.
2c	2c	"House of Doom"	Written by : Alain Matz; Storyboarded by : Jocelan Hillton	September 25, 2006
Pucca, Ching and Abyo want to go inside to see Garu's house which is full of booby traps. Although they manage to slip past Garu and get inside, they are met with danger at almost every turn.
3a	3a	"The Cursed Tie"	Written by : Mug Erskine-Kellie; Storyboarded by : Dennis Crawford	October 2, 2006
When Garu is given a tie from Tobe imbued with a curse for his birthday, making him dangerously clumsy, he is forced to leave Sooga Village. Meanwhile, Pucca seeks out the feather of the rare Pink-Bellied Crane, which is the only cure for the cursed tie.
3b	3b	"Chicken Spots"	Story by : Su Moon; Teleplay by : Shane Simmons; Storyboarded by : Jocelan Hillton	October 2, 2006
Shaman of the Vagabond Clan makes a concoction of chicken spots (similar to chicken pox) that spreads to Sooga Village, causing all villagers act and talk like chickens. A concerned Pucca goes to Master Soo, who gives her a fox costume to scare the chicken spots away. When Tobe attempts to take advantage of Garu in his incapacitated state, the chicken spots appear and infects him, making Garu talk and act like a chicken. The Vagabond clan decides it's a good idea to turn off Shaman's cauldron before they get the same chicken spots.
3c	3c	"Flower Power"	Written by : Brian Hartigan; Storyboarded by : Jocelan Hillton	October 2, 2006
After having Master Soo's garden destroyed by Garu and Abyo's kung fu fighting, he plants a Ninja fly trap (similar to a Venus fly trap) that eats ninjas. Pucca sees the flower and picks it for Garu, wanting to give it to him as a gift. The flower eats Abyo when he rips off his shirt as well as Ching. Seeing the flower wants to eat him, Garu tries to get rid of it, only be found and taken back by Pucca until it does so. A furious Pucca defeats the flower and makes it spit out not only Garu, but Abyo and Ching as well as. Finally, she sends the flower on its way out by breaking the stem of a nearby flower, inferring it is not welcome in her town.
4a	4a	"Cat Toy"	Written by : Shane Simmons; Storyboarded by : Jeff Barker	October 9, 2006
While fighting in the forest, Garu and Abyo are brought to the Goh-Rong restaurant attracted to the smell of food. When Pucca tries to kiss Garu, he quickly escapes to the kitchen, where he discovers the three chefs' shrinking juice and drinks it. Shrinking in size, he becomes an easy target for the Cat Clan and tries to avoid them. Mio comes to save Garu, but sees Garu as a mouse and tries to eat him. Garu escapes, only to find himself in Pucca's dollhouse.
4b	4b	"Let's Go Fly a Ninja"	Written by : Jack Monaco; Storyboarded by : Rob Boutilier	October 9, 2006
All villagers fly their kites on the grassy hills during the Kite Festival. Pucca brings her homemade Garu kite, while Garu brings a traditional box kite. Tobe makes his own kite, which is more of a small blimp, and uses it to cut down the other villagers' kites. With the help of Pucca, Garu takes down Tobe and his kite.
4c	4c	"Gone with the Noodles"	Story by : Su Moon; Teleplay by : Brian Hartigan; Storyboarded by : Jeff Barker	October 9, 2006
Garu stumbles upon a movie set as he runs away from Pucca, with Abyo being attacked by Tobe's ninjas and Ching roped to the railroad tracks. Believing it is real, he defeats the ninjas much to Abyo's chagrin. The director finds Garu more charming and decides to focus on him more. Pucca finds Garu again and he runs away in a high-speed chase that the director tries to film. When the movie finally comes out, Abyo is shocked to find that it stars Garu and Pucca instead of him.
5a	5a	"Them Bones"	Written by : Johnny John-John Kearns; Storyboarded by : Tim Packford	October 16, 2006
On Halloween, Abyo, Ching, and Pucca are dressed in costume while Garu is not. After seeing Pucca in a wedding gown, Garu becomes terrified that his skeleton jumps out of his body and runs around Sooga Village trying to hide from Pucca. The three give chase to his skeleton, but are unable to catch it. In the end, Pucca unzips her exterior to reveal her skeleton and promptly chases after skeleton Garu.
5b	5b	"Ghost of a Kiss"	Story by : Alain Matz; Teleplay by : Brian Hartigan; Storyboarded by : Sam To	October 16, 2006
Pucca bought a picture of her ancestors and bring it to Garu, but it was a ghost that is hunting him. As a result, Pucca must stop her ancestor by shaking out a photograph of a ghost who looks like Garu and let her chase it back to the photograph where they belong.
5c	5c	"The Usual Ching"	Story by : Alain Matz; Teleplay by : Colin Yardley and Larry Raskin; Storyboarded by : Lyn Hart	October 16, 2006
Wanting to warn Santa who is working at the laundromat, Doga brings her laundry to get cleaned there and put her clothes in the evil washer, while Ching comes in with her laundry. Santa confuses one of Doga's sock for one of Ching's sock, and puts Ching's sock in with Doga's laundry, then Doga's sock with Ching's laundry. When Ching gets her laundry back, the misplaced sock slowly turns her evil and she causes trouble around town, blaming Pucca for everything. Eventually, Pucca can get the sock off. Meanwhile, Ching's sock is stuck on Doga's shirt, turning her good.
6a	6a	"Treasure of the Comfy Sofa"	Written by : Shane Simmons; Storyboarded by : Rob Boutilier	October 30, 2006
Abyo has broken another pair of nunchucks, which his father refuses to pay for another. Bruce mentions the legend of a sofa with an affinity for spare change, noting that it had probably amassed a fortune. Abyo seeks out and finds the sofa, dropping inside it while trying to find the treasure. Meanwhile, Garu also falls in after trying to escape from Pucca. An angry Pucca tries destroying the couch, which puts Abyo and Garu in danger. Chasing it to the hill, she proceeds to beat up the couch until it spits Garu out. Master Soo stops it and demands the couch return to the restaurant at once. Pucca's uncles claim they cannot keep the couch because it is torn down and they need the money to fix it. Shortly afterwards, the couch spits out all coins it collected over the years, including Garu coin which Pucca collects. Master Soo finally agrees to the chefs' terms to get the couch fixed.
6b	6b	"Snow Ninjas"	Story by : Su Moon; Teleplay by : Shane Simmons; Storyboarded by : Rob Boutilier	October 30, 2006
While the villagers are playing in the snow on a snowy day, Tobe plots to use a snow plow against Garu and rushes back to his hideout to start it up. Master Soo wakes up and decides to change the weather to summer via the weather machine after touching the cold floor, throwing off Tobe's plans after his snow plow gets stuck in mud. While Master Soo is distracted, he changes the weather back to winter. Angry that her snow sculpture of her and Garu kissing melted, with her hedge trimming of the same thing fell apart, Pucca changes the weather to summer again just as Garu is about to be hurt by Tobe's snow plow. Tobe sends his minion to change the weather back, causing the weather to go back and forth until eventually Pucca snaps off the lever, as well as a tornado to form and a cold wind to blow in, freezing the feuding Tobe and Garu.
6c	6c	"Slam Bam Birthday Bash"	Written by : Alain Matz; Storyboarded by : Cory Evans	October 30, 2006
The villagers of Sooga Village are planning to throw Pucca a surprise birthday party on her birthday. While setting up at the Goh-Rong restaurant, Garu is tasked with keeping Pucca away from the restaurant. Garu initially succeeds in leading her away, but Pucca's curiosity wins out and she goes to the Goh-Rong, only to find it empty, as everyone has hidden the decorations and themselves. Feeling as although everyone has forgotten her birthday, Pucca runs to the mountains where she cries. When it is time for the party, Garu follows Pucca and tries to get her to go by blowing a kiss to cheer her up. Pucca chases Garu back to the restaurant where everyone is happily waiting.
7a	7a	"The Sooga Showdown"	Written by : Jack Alvino; Storyboarded by : Kenny Park	November 13, 2006
Garu, Abyo, Ssoso, and Tobe enter a race where they pull one of Master Soo's beautiful ladies around a racecourse in a rickshaw. Tobe tries to keep Garu from winning by getting him off course or setting up traps, to which he passes through. Ssoso wins, but his prize is having the "honor" of pulling Master Soo and his beautiful ladies in a rickshaw as much as they wanted.
7b	7b	"Scenes from a Maul"	Written by : Jack Alvino; Storyboarded by : Sherwin Macario	November 13, 2006
At the night market, Pucca and Ching are looking at dresses while Garu is helping Abyo choose a new shirt. After buying a dress for Ching, Pucca stumbles on a bridal shop where she tries on a wedding dress. A ruckus is caused when the Vagabond Clan steal a wrapped gift from Santa's shop. While running from Bruce, Shaman accidentally turns Clown into a pig, and the two part ways from Jing-Jing, still holding the gift. Garu stops her, only to be chased by Pucca who is still wearing the wedding gown. He bumps into Clown and Shaman, and Pucca throws them into the wedding cake, which Bruce is taking to the police station. By the fountain, Pucca bumps into Jing-Jing, who throws the gift in the air and is also thrown into the cake. Master Soo is reading a book as the bridal shop owner is throwing rice, and Garu catches the gift, which flips open to reveal a ring, giving Pucca the illusion that it is her wedding. It is cut short when Santa takes back his present, which Garu uses the distraction to escape.
7c	7c	"Up from the Depths"	Written by : Alain Matz; Storyboarded by : Gerry Fournier	November 13, 2006
While Abyo and Garu are fishing in the lake, Pucca and Ching join them upon swimming. However, the fish are not biting, and the only fish that Abyo managed to catch is instantly eaten by Mio. Eventually, Garu gets a tug on his line, but the fish ends up dragging him and the boat along with it. It reveals itself to be a giant fish, and tugs Garu down into the lake. Pucca follows after Garu, blowing him bubbles shaped like hearts and kissing him, and the fish ends up swallowing Garu. An angry Pucca chases down the fish and punches it, forcing it to eject Garu and Santa trapped inside, then punches the fish to the surface where it lands in the Goh-Rong restaurant cut into sushi pieces. Pucca pulls the drain plug, draining the lake and allowing Ching and Abyo to collect the fish. Dada gets Pucca and Garu, who were trapped in the plumbing pipes, out of the toilet in the Goh-Rong restaurant, and the two sit down for a sushi feast.
8a	8a	"Dream On"	Written by : Len MacKeigan; Storyboarded by : Kent Webb	November 20, 2006
Pucca awakes from a nightmare, in which she was having a joyful time with the other villagers of Sooga Village and dancing with Garu happily, until Tobe comes in and ruins everything. Curious about other people's dreams, Pucca travels to their houses where she sees their dreams, then goes to Tobe's hideout. Tobe happily dreams of the day he finally destroys Garu. An angry Pucca enters his dream and rescues Garu, then leaves the hideout after dressing Tobe in a Chinese opera costume to humiliate him.
8b	8b	"Armour Plated Love"	Story by : Su Moon; Teleplay by : Julia Schroeder; Storyboarded by : Jocelan Hillton	November 20, 2006
Pucca is making noodle deliveries when Tobe steals her motor scooter to use as the final piece for his ultimate weapon against Garu. This forces Pucca to make the deliveries on foot, but she immediately is cheered up when her uncles give her the special order she wanted to take to Garu, wrapped in a pretty way. Garu, Ching, and Abyo are training when Tobe comes with the ultimate weapon and attacks. Tobe starts chasing after Garu with the weapon when Pucca shows up to deliver the special order. Garu avoids Pucca and knocks on the hatch to the opening, causing Tobe to come out and get hit by Garu. Tobe swings the weapon around to make Garu faceplant in the dirt. Pucca retaliates by breaking the weapon in half, and using the upper half as a baseball bat to hit Tobe. As Pucca is about to kiss Garu, the gong signaling another delivery rings. Pucca leaves, but pops out of the special delivery box to give Garu the noodles and kiss him.
8c	8c	"Catnapped"	Written by : Meredith Jennings-Offen; Storyboarded by : Marlon Deane	November 20, 2006
While training, Pucca shoots a suction arrow at Garu with a coupon to the Goh-Rong restaurant. With Mio in tow, he goes to have dinner there. Mio sees Yani and decides to eat with her, but makes a mess in the process, ignoring Yani who goes to clean off in the cat's restroom. However, the sign for the restroom was switched to a door leading outside, causing Yani to be kidnapped by Tobe. When leaving the restaurant, Garu and Mio hear Yani's distressed cry and chase her. Pucca shows up on her motorbike, picking up Garu in the process. They are led to a ship where Garu and Mio are trapped while trying to rescue Yani. Pucca comes in to rescue Garu, quickly dispatching Tobe's minions, and using a swordfish to cut Tobe's clothes, causing him to swim away in embarrassment. She brings Garu, Mio, and Yani back to the restaurant, and while the cats eat, Pucca shows Garu her Jell-O. An angry Garu tries to leave, but Pucca sticks him in the Jell-O and kisses him repeatedly.
9a	9a	"Invisible Trouble"	Written by : Alain Matz; Storyboarded by : Kenny Park	November 27, 2006
While doing his grooming routine, a flock of birds come in through Master Soo's window. He throws a bottle of his vanishing potion at the birds, which is picked up by one of them and taken to Sooga Village. It ends up in the dishwashing tub at the Goh-Rong restaurant and spills open in the water. While washing dishes, Pucca accidentally splashes water on herself, becoming invisible. She leaves the restaurant with a jump rope and freaks the villagers out. Seeing Garu training, she kisses him while meditating, then tickles him. Tobe and his minions attack, but the latter characters are beaten by Pucca, still tickling Garu, then leaves as Garu tries to escape. The villagers meet to discuss the phantom, when they see Garu running from a bundle of flowers Pucca is holding, convincing them to hide. Pucca picks up Garu, but enticed by the smells coming from the restaurant, returns to the kitchen where she makes some noodles. Dada, who is carrying the dishwashing tub spills the water, causes the restaurant to disappear. Garu tries to find a way out, but is kissed by Pucca at every turn.
9b	9b	"High Voltage Ninjas"	Written by : Mug Erskine-Kellie; Storyboarded by : Cory Evans	November 27, 2006
Despite the thunderstorm, Tobe is struck by lightning while fighting with Garu, giving him lightning powers which he promptly uses this against Garu. Seeing the fight outside, Pucca tries to interfere only to get hit by Tobe's lightning. She stumbles inside a shop with carpet, and charges herself up using the carpet to have the same lightning powers, which she passes to Garu. Garu and Tobe fight once more, but Pucca interferes once more to make Tobe lose.
9c	9c	"Ninjail Birds"	Story by : Su Moon; Teleplay by : Brian Hartigan; Storyboarded by : Tim Packford	November 27, 2006
While fighting in the village and making a mess, Garu and Tobe are taken to jail by Bruce, being put in the same cell. Pucca tries to visit Garu by bribing the officer, but when he goes to unlock the cage door, Garu takes the keys and flushes them down the toilet. As night falls, Pucca tries various ways to break into the jail cell, but is bothered by Garu each time. After her last attempt to use an anchor and her motor scooter to drag the entire police house away ends with Tobe being pulled instead, she is caught by Bruce, then taken in for speeding. Pucca is put in the same jail cell as Garu, and Bruce flushes the spare keys down the toilet to keep him from taking them again, trapping them inside.
10a	10a	"Tis the Season for Revenge"	Story by : Jayson Thiessen and Jamie Mason; Teleplay by : Colin Yardley and Larry Raskin; Storyboarded by : Dan Hughes	December 2, 2006
On Christmas in Sooga Village, all villagers's gifts are stolen by a stranger seeking revenge on an old nemesis.
10b	10b	"Northern Lights Out"	Written by : Jeff Wastila; Storyboarded by : Steve Whitehouse	December 2, 2006
As the northern lights go out at Iglooga Village, Garu must find a way to fix them before the snow beast can destroy the village.
10c	10c	"Secret Santa"	Written by : Johnny John-John Kearns; Storyboarded by : Rob Boutilier	December 2, 2006
The villagers of Sooga Village line up to see Santa, not knowing that it is Tobe in disguise.
11a	11a	"Rootin' Tootin' Ninjas"	Written by : Steve Sullivan; Storyboarded by : Tim Packford	December 11, 2006
Wanting to make a wish that Garu would love her, Pucca ends up digging a hole to the other side of the earth upon digging a wishing well, ending up in the Wild West. Ching follows her there while holding to her pet chicken, Won. There, they meet another girl who looks like Pucca named Can-Can Girl, and finds a Garu look-alike who is a sheriff named Marshall Arts. Not caring for Can-Can Girl, Marshall Arts is attracted to Sooga Village's Pucca. Enraged and jealous of Pucca, Can-Can Girl starts fighting with her. While sparring, Garu and Abyo accidentally fall in the wishing well and end up in the Wild West as well. Suddenly, Tobe look-alike comes and starts to fight the gang. Together with their clones, they fight Tobe and his ninjas.
11b	11b	"Special Delivery"	Written by : Johnny John-John Kearns; Storyboarded by : Kent Webb	December 11, 2006
The Vagabond Clan tries to get noodles from Pucca for free, but end up going to the jail.
11c	11c	"Ninjitsu for Dummies"	Written by : Jack Monaco; Storyboarded by : Cory Evans	December 11, 2006
Abyo steals a manual that Pucca created to make love ninja moves.
12a	12a	"Misplaced Face"	Story by : Greg Sullivan; Teleplay by : Johnny John-John Kearns; Storyboarded by : Rob Boutilier	December 18, 2006
Abyo loses his face when he shows off in front of the villagers, but ends up humiliating himself. Ching and Pucca track down Abyo's face, but find it has fallen in Tobe's hands. Tobe uses Abyo's face to lure Garu to him under the guise of Abyo, where he plans to kill Garu. After an intervention by Pucca, Abyo receives his face back, but it is upside-down.
12b	12b	"Swiss Kiss"	Story by : Alain Matz; Teleplay by : Jack Alvino; Storyboarded by : Cory Evans	December 18, 2006
Pucca and Garu go to Switzerland on Policeman Bruce's helicopter, where a Swiss girl falls in love with Garu. She invites him to her house to eat with her family. At the end, they accidentally marry until Pucca stops them.
12c	12c	"Big Top Bang Bang"	Story by : Su Moon; Teleplay by : Meredith Jennings-Offen; Storyboarded by : Jocelan Hillton	December 18, 2006
The circus once belonged to Clown of the Vagabond Clan is coming to Sooga Village. The Vagabond Clan take out the members of the circus, and plan to run it themselves, hoping the terrible performance will make the circus lose money and close down. However, Garu and Pucca's ninja moves when Pucca is chasing after Garu steals the show, and makes it a success. The Vagabond Clan tries to escape after intervention, but the performers block their attempt and send them flying literally.
13a	13a	"No Year's Eve"	Story by : Alain Matz; Teleplay by : Colin Yardley and Larry Raskin; Storyboarded by : Don Boone	December 31, 2006
Muji discovers a gray hair growing in his mustache much to his horror. Due to his fear of getting older, he sends his zombies to kidnap Baby New Year. Meanwhile, Sooga Village is in a panic since the New Year cannot come without Baby New Year. Pucca and Ching find it then fight Muji and his zombies. Baby New Year is brought back safe and begins the New Year, declaring it the Year of the Pucca.
13b	13b	"Noodle to the Stars"	Story by : Dallas Parker; Teleplay by : Jonathan Groves; Storyboarded by : Tim Packford	December 31, 2006
A futuristic place known as Space Station Sooga has run out of noodles, and the batch of infinite noodles has been stolen by Muji much to the panic of the residents. Space Ninja Garu and his friend A-B20 (like Star Wars' C-3PO) set out to bring back the noodles. Along the way, the two meet Alien Pucca, who follows them to Muji's spaceship. Once Garu and A-B20, they find the infinite noodles, only to be trapped by Muji. After defeating his space zombies, Muji eats the noodles, but grows to a massive proportion and blows up. With the noodles gone again, the residents panic again. However, Pucca brings a noodle restaurant that contains infinite and regular noodles, saving Space Station Sooga.
13c	13c	"Ring Ring's Party Favours"	Story by : Alain Matz; Teleplay by : Colin Yardley and Larry Raskin; Storyboarded by : Jocelan Hillton	December 31, 2006
Ring-Ring invites all villagers to a party at her house, except Pucca. To retaliate, the chefs decide to throw Pucca a party at the Goh-Rong and invite everyone. On the day of the party, Ring-Ring eagerly awaits for her guests to arrive, but eventually, is shocked to hear from the Vagabond Clan (the only people who showed up at her party) that everyone is at Pucca's party. Enraged, Ring-Ring goes to the Goh-Rong where she makes several attempts to crash the party, after the attempts fail, she began attacking Pucca and everyone else, before destroying the Goh-Rong with her scream. She then breaks down crying, and questions why Pucca had her party on the same day as hers, and did not invite her. Yumi comes to Ring-Ring with a letter (that she kept ignoring) and Ring-Ring finds out that Pucca invited her despite Pucca not being invited to Ring-Ring's party. Ring-Ring even asked what day she was going to have her party on so Pucca could make sure she wouldn't have her party on the same day. Touched, Ring-Ring joins the party with everyone else.
14a	14a	"Ninjasaurus"	Written by : Jeff Wastila; Storyboarded by : Tim Packford	January 15, 2007
Abyo, Ching, Garu, Ssoso, and Pucca are on a playground carousel, when Pucca spins it so fast that they travel back in time to the dinosaur age. Ssoso is captured by a pterodactyl and mistaken for one of its children. The four travel to the highest mountain to rescue Ssoso, who has been rejected by the mother pterodactyl after finding out Ssoso was not one of her kids. The five are targeted by a T-Rex who runs after them. After Pucca spins the carousel forward to the present time, they are shocked to find that the T-Rex that had chased them had its body fused with Pucca's.
14b	14b	"Unfortunate Cookies"	Written by : Alain Matz; Storyboarded by : Dennis Crawford	January 15, 2007
Master Turtle makes fortune cookies with fortunes that actually come true. Tobe tries to take advantage of this by capturing the old turtle and forcing him to make an explosive fortune that he plans to give to Garu. However, Garu does not read the fortune. Instead of eating the cookie, Tobe reads the fortune to him, only to blow up himself. The old turtle master then scolds Tobe who is trapped in a portable vacuum cleaner container for going against his advice to make a terrible fortune cookie. Pucca gets her own fortune cookie that ends with her and Garu fling on rainbows and her kissing him.
14c	14c	"On Thin Ice"	Story by : Alain Matz; Teleplay by : Jack Alvino; Storyboarded by : Rob Boutilier	January 15, 2007
While Pucca and her friends are playing on the ice, Tobe has yet another evil plan to take his revenge on Garu. Pucca foils this, but Garu tries to escape in Tobe's shark submarine. Thinking he is safe, Garu smiles in relief until he catches Pucca in the submarine and screams in terror as she runs to kiss him.
15a	15a	"Matinee Mayhem"	Written by : Shane Simmons; Storyboarded by : Craig Wilson	February 5, 2007
Garu goes to the cinema to watch a martial arts movie, but Pucca changes the film to a romantic ninja film instead. Tobe and his ninjas attack Garu, and Garu makes a copy of himself to keep Pucca company as he fights Tobe. The two spar, but end up in the theater next to the one they were fighting in that is showing the martial arts film. They opt to watch rather than fighting. Meanwhile, Pucca discovers that the Garu she has is fake, and goes to the movie Garu is in upon becoming furious.
15b	15b	"Feud Fight"	Written by : Colin Yardley; Larry Raskin; Storyboarded by : Craig Wilson	February 5, 2007
The chefs go on strike and Sooga Village goes on a Jajangmyeon Noodle famine. After a noodle imperfection, they end up fighting, turning the villagers into zombies.
15c	15c	"Dance, Pucca, Dance"	Written by : Alain Matz; Storyboarded by : Lyn Hart	February 5, 2007
With the costume party happening at the Goh-Rong restaurant, Pucca has made a Garu costume for herself and a flower costume for Garu. Unfortunately, Garu cannot move while in the costume. Tobe crashes the party and secretly targets Pucca dressed as Garu, but is shocked to find that "Garu" has become a much better martial artist when he attacks. As Pucca reveals her costume, Tobe spies Garu in his flower costume and proceeds to make fun of it, to which she is not amused.
16a	16a	"Evil Love"	Written by : Mark Leiren-Young; Storyboarded by : Marlon Deane	February 14, 2007
Tobe falls in love with Jing-Jing after one of Cupid's arrows misfires. The two are in love, and do several actions around the village to express their love. Tobe proposes to Jing-Jing, to which she agrees. On their wedding day, Pucca takes out the arrow Cupid misfired from Tobe's backside to give it to Garu, leaving Tobe confused. He accidentally confirms his wish to marry Jing-Jing before the couple walk away from the wedding.
16b	16b	"A Better Boyfriend"	Written by : Johnny John-John Kearns; Storyboarded by : Dennis Crawford	February 14, 2007
Ching tries to make Abyo her boyfriend until Muji kidnaps her.
16c	16c	"Prince Not So Charming"	Written by : J. Larry Carroll; Storyboarded by : Dennis Crawford	February 14, 2007
A rich celebrity named Lazlo Gotalotovich tries to make Pucca his girlfriend, but Pucca is not interested and kicks him into the volcano until he gets injured.
17a	17a	"A Leg Up"	Written by : Brian Hartigan; Storyboarded by : Jocelan Hillton	February 26, 2007
While training at Turtle Hall, Garu is running away from Pucca when he accidentally steps in a hole and breaks his leg. After taken to the hospital and put in a cast, Pucca becomes his personal nurse, much to his horror. Meanwhile, hearing of the news, Tobe disguises himself and his ninjas as doctors so he can finish off Garu. However, he is mistaken for a real doctor and brought to do various things, such as performing surgery. After Garu escapes Pucca, the two meet and spar, only to get injured even further, landing them both in the hospital again.
17b	17b	"Surf Ninjas"	Written by : Colin Yardley; Larry Raskin; Storyboarded by : Marlon Deane	February 26, 2007
While at the beach, Muji and his zombies come in and declare the beach as theirs. Garu challenges Muji and his zombies to a surf off to fight for the beach. Muji attempts cheating in various ways to knock Garu off his board, but Pucca interferes. Garu wins the surfing contest and the beach returns to the public, while Muji is swallowed by the shark he used as a surfboard.
17c	17c	"The Shirtless Avenger"	Written by : Mug Erskine-Kellie; Storyboarded by : Dennis Crawford	February 26, 2007
Abyo has received the kit and becomes a superhero until he starts arresting the villagers. Pucca intervenes in time by beating up Abyo and he's forced to learn a hard lesson.
18a	18a	"And the Band Played Rong"	Written by : Jack Alvino; Storyboarded by : Kent Webb	March 5, 2007
The 3 chefs agree to make a commercial for the Goh-Rong restaurant. Several of the villagers audition, including Garu. Tobe plans to blow up Garu while onstage, but when the plan doesn't work, he instead tries to fight Garu, at first with words, then with the instruments. Meanwhile, Pucca and Ching rent instruments and recruit Abyo to form a band, and play for the 3 chefs to be in the commercial.
18b	18b	"Tobe's Nighttime Troubles"	Story by : Alain Matz; Teleplay by : Johnny John-John Kearns; Storyboarded by : Dan Hughes	March 5, 2007
While Garu is eating at the Goh-Rong, Tobe comes in and challenges Garu to a fight. The two are about to battle when they are stopped by Master Soo. The two agree to fight the next morning, and Tobe leaves, but also plots to keep Garu from getting sleep that same night. Pucca, overhearing this, stays up as well and thwarts all of Tobe's plans, leaving him tired in the morning.
18c	18c	"Datin' and Dumplins"	Written by : Jack Alvino; Storyboarded by : Dan Hughes	March 5, 2007
When Kua, an adventurer and daredevil Lara Croft parody, eats at the Goh-Rong, and compliments the chefs, the three fall in love, and agree to do daredevil activities with her. She leads them to bungee jump out of a hot air balloon, snowboard down Mount Everest, and swim with sharks while in a cage, to which they all try but fail to do. The chefs, in stitches and casts, and Kua return to the restaurant, where Kua requests noodles, to which the chefs magically get better. When asked to choose whom to date, Kua starts to think when she is distracted by Master Soo, who recruits her as another one of his lovely ladies.
19a	19a	"Oh the Bells!"	Written by : Johnny John-John Kearns; Storyboarded by : Tim Packford	March 19, 2007
Tired of Pucca constantly distracting him, Garu gifts her a bell to wear around her neck so Garu knows when she is coming. Tobe uses this to his advantage by ringing bells wherever Garu goes to make him go paranoid, and to lead him into the trap he set up. When Garu falls into the trap, he is unknowingly saved by Pucca from a giant falling boulder, to which she angrily beats up Tobe and his ninjas for.
19b	19b	"Lumberjacked"	Written by : Steve Sullivan; Storyboarded by : Rob Boutilier	March 19, 2007
Pucca, Garu, Abyo and Ching are collecting maple syrup from maple trees when Mushi shows up and declares the forest as his. Garu steps up to challenge Mushi to a lumberjack off in order to protect the forest. Mushi tries to cheat in order to win, but Pucca uses other tactics to make Mushi lose in the end.
19c	19c	"Autograph This!"	Written by : Jack Alvino; Storyboarded by : Lyn Hart	March 19, 2007
Garu's favorite martial artist has come to visit Sooga Village. He, along with his friends, go to attend the show, in which Garu intends to get an autograph. While his friends get in, Garu's ticket is stolen by Tobe, to which he fights him in order to get it back. Meanwhile, Pucca tries to get an autograph for Garu by beating the martial artist in his many tests, though he refuses to give an autograph, until he is crushed by a part of the ceiling from which Tobe had fallen on, to which he agrees to give just one autograph. But when Tobe taunts Garu by stealing the book that was autographed for him, Pucca gives Tobe his just rewards by beating him up and sending him flying.
20a	20a	"Man of the Tree House"	Story by : Alain Matz; Teleplay by : Len MacKeigan; Storyboarded by : Jocelan Hillton	March 26, 2007
Garu and Abyo build a mediocre tree house, to which they refuse to let girls in. In response, Pucca and Ching make a much better tree house, and refuse to let the boys in. When the girl's tree house is destroyed, they force Garu and Abyo to shelter them from the storm outside.
20b	20b	"Spainful"	Written by : Mug Erskine-Kellie; Storyboarded by : Sam To	March 26, 2007
Garu and Abyo head to Spain to run in the Running of the Bulls, but Tobe wants to ruin the Running of the Bulls by building a mechanic bull to destroy Garu. Note: The episode's title is a portmanteau of "Spain" and "Painful".
20c	20c	"Romancing the Clone"	Story by : Greg Sullivan; Teleplay by : Brian Hartigan; Storyboarded by : Kent Webb	March 26, 2007
Garu creates a clone and it becomes his own talking person, whom Pucca falls in love with.
21a	21a	"Tokyo a Go-Go"	Written by : Jeff Wastila; Storyboarded by : Eduardo Soriano	April 2, 2007
Master Soo orders an assembly line of sushi from Japan to his castle. Garu, Abyo, Ching and Pucca follow the assembly line to Tokyo. While there, Ching and Pucca wear geisha outfits, while Abyo and Garu go to see sumo wrestling. Abyo challenges one of the wrestlers, but is ultimately defeated. Angered, Garu challenges the wrestler, and wins. Two more wrestlers come and Garu beats them. The three wrestlers fuse together to make a giant sumo wrestler, and proceed to attack Garu. Pucca transforms into a noodle version of Sailor Moon and defeats the giant sumo wrestler.
21b	21b	"Ninja License"	Written by : Johnny John-John Kearns; Storyboarded by : Steve Whitehouse	April 2, 2007
With the wave of a flag from Ching, Garu and Abyo prepare to battle, but are quickly interrupted by the arrival of Pucca who jumps into Garu. Garu also takes his ninja training studies.
21c	21c	"Four-Alarm Fire"	Written by : Shane Simmons; Storyboarded by : Don Boone	April 2, 2007
Sooga Village is hosting a parade for their local firefighting squad, despite them having never put out an actual fire, but the chefs enjoy it as a reason to cook. The Fire Brigade digs in but the dragon peppers turn them into "Fire Goblins" who immediately set everything ablaze. Officer Bruce deputizes people into the new Sooga Village Fire Brigade and they hop into a firetruck to deal with the problem. Meanwhile, Pucca scales the tree where Garu hurt his thigh and kisses him, causing him to fall.
22a	22a	"The Ring Ring Touch"	Story by : Alain Matz; Teleplay by : Brian Hartigan; Storyboarded by : Steve Whitehouse	April 9, 2007
Ring Ring tries to sabotage Pucca's supermodeling career, only to make her look better. However, during Pucca's last photo shoot, Ring Ring holds Garu's cat Mio, which prompts Garu to come looking for him. When Garu takes Mio back, Ring Ring kisses him with the intent to make Pucca look bad. A battle begins between the two as Zoom eagerly takes photos. In the end, it turns out Zoom was shooting photos for advertising a beauty cream (showing a picture of a filthy Ring Ring and a picture of Pucca in her ball gown). Pucca is pleased with these results, but Ring Ring throws a temper tantrum before literally exploding in anger.
22b	22b	"Garu of the Jungle"	Written by : Doug Molitor; Storyboarded by : Kent Webb	April 9, 2007
Pucca and the chefs search for Garu of the Jungle until Tobe tries to capture him.
22c	22c	"Peace Out"	Written by : Jonathan Groves; Storyboarded by : Kent Webb	April 9, 2007
The day starts out very roughly for Abyo, being beaten by his Kung Fu alarm clock and then having his father drink the last of the milk. He begins by showing him a calming movie, but Santa is in the theatre as well, eating popcorn. He goes to Ssoso's temple for an inner peace. As a last resort, Sosso shows Abyo his most extreme treatment: the Room of Ultimate Nothingness which is literally a white room of empty space in which he locks Abyo. Abyo encourages his behaviour as it will help him with his anger, but then must flee as Sosso turns his new aggressive approach on the fighter.
23a	23a	"Itsy Bitsy Enemy Within"	Written by : Shane Simmons; Storyboarded by : Dennis Crawford	April 16, 2007
As part of another plot of vengeance, Tobe travels in a small submarine in Garu's bloodstream and attacks some of his body parts, angering Pucca. She goes inside his body shrunk and kick the submarine out before she grows back. Afterwards the doctor informs Garu about his bodies inheriting new antibodies resembling Pucca much his detest
23b	23b	"Puccahontas"	Written by : Doug Molitor; Storyboarded by : Sam To	April 16, 2007
In this Pocahontas-like story, Garu (as Garunimo) must pass a lot of tests before becoming a warrior, which is something he intends to do and bring honor to his disgraced family. What he doesn't anticipate is that Pucca (as Puccahontas) will do all she can to sabotage his efforts so he would have to marry her. Garunimo tries to focus on the tasks given to him, but finds it hard going with her around. Eventually, Puccahontas wins the honor of being great warrior and chooses Garunimo to marry her much to his dismay.
23c	23c	"Sooga Size Me"	Written by : Johnny John-John Kearns; Storyboarded by : Don Boone	April 16, 2007
Two Americans named Tex Lugie and Sloppy Sue decide to spread the Western way of life by open an "authentic" Western fast-food restaurant, after becoming discontent with the Sooga lifestyle. However, when the citizens of Sooga get fat (including Garu) and the Goh Rong shuts down due to unprofitability, Pucca doesn't take this facing down.
24a	24a	"Little Miss Sooga"	Written by : Johnny John-John Kearns; Storyboarded by : Rob Boutilier	April 30, 2007
Garu is offered the position of judge for a Beauty Pageant, to which he accepts after told it would bring him great honor. Ring-Ring and Pucca enter the pageant, though Ring Ring cheats by eliminating most of the competition (except for Pucca) and making several attempts to eliminate Pucca: ranging from sabotaging her dress (which fails due to Yumi accidentally getting silkworms to make her dress more beautiful than Ring Rings) to ruining her traditional Korean dance (which Pucca improvises after taking to the air). However, this served to make her look better in front of the crowd (including Garu), enraging Ring-Ring and causing her to attack the judges' table.
24b	24b	"Gold Medal Garu"	Written by : Mug Erskine-Kellie; Storyboarded by : Tim Packford	April 30, 2007
Set in Ancient Greece, Tobe challenges Garu to several Olympic competitions, to which Pucca, a goddess, decides to judge after falling in love with Garu. Tobe tries to cheat but his plans are foiled by Pucca.
24c	24c	"Cat Scratch Fever"	Written by : Mark Leiren-Young; Storyboarded by : Lyn Hart	April 30, 2007
The gang tries to catch Mio to take him to the vet.
25a	25a	"Garu Down Under"	Written by : Jeff Wastila; Storyboarded by : Eduardo Soriano; Dan Hughes	May 7, 2007
Garu has gone away to Australia and was kidnapped by an Australian man and got inflated by the many apparently poisonous things and it's up to Pucca, Abyo and Ching to rescue him before he's in any more danger.
25b	25b	"Woolen Warrior"	Story by : Jayson Thiessen; Teleplay by : Jack Monaco; Storyboarded by : Jocelan Hillton	May 7, 2007
Pucca creates a sweater for Garu to wear on his mountain climb.
25c	25c	"A Close Shave"	Written by : Mug Erskine-Kellie; Storyboarded by : Marlon Deane	May 7, 2007
Muji tries to shave Dugong's mustache until Pucca gets involved.
26a	26a	"Soap Opera"	Written by : Mug Erskine-Kellie; Storyboarded by : Kent Webb	May 14, 2007
Dada fantasizes about being more than a dishwasher, and marvels at Ring-Ring. While washing dishes, Mr. Dishy, the brand of dish soap he uses, manifests itself into a genie-like being and makes Dada squeaky clean, giving him a handsome appearance, but warning him that if he came into contact with any kind of dirt, he would revert to his old appearance. Ring-Ring immediately falls in love with Dada and the two become a couple. Dada shows off to Ring-Ring by gathering her gifts and pleasing the rest of the town, though with each attempt, gets himself dirty in the process. While at the Goh-Rong, Mr. Dishy is stolen by Pucca, who uses it to wash the rest of the dishes, while Dada reverts to his old appearance when some dirt comes on his pants. Ring-Ring is humiliated and transforms, but doesn't bother to fight, feeling that Dada isn't worth it.
26b	26b	"The Choo-Choo Trouble"	Story by : Jayson Thiessen; Teleplay by : Brian Hartigan; Storyboarded by : Lazarino Baarde; Louie Escauriaga	May 14, 2007
It's up to Garu to deliver a present to Master Soo's brother, Loo. He goes in a train and Pucca goes in the train. Pucca causes trouble when she puts much coal and the people's presents to the train get faster. She gets more shocked when she see the road's like a roller coaster and Tobe's helpers explode the bridge. Pucca puts more coal and the people's presents to the train jump in the exploded bridge. Garu arrives at time to deliver Master Soo's present to Master Loo and he finds that's lizards. Garu plays the vase away and Pucca drags Garu back to the train where she kisses Garu.
26c	26c	"Pucca Goes Dutch"	Story by : Paul Dawson; Teleplay by : Phil Nice; Storyboarded by : Rob Boutilier	May 14, 2007
Tobe tries to take over Holland with his automobile windmill.

=== Season 2 (2008) ===
No. overall	No. in season	Title	Written by	Original release date
27a	1a	"Puccapatra"	Written by : Mug Erskine-Kellie; Storyboarded by : Jocelan Thiessen	March 3, 2008
Ring Ring plans to become the most beautiful girl in Egypt.
27b	1b	"Knock It Off!"	Written by : Jonathan Groves; Storyboarded by : Kenny Park	March 3, 2008
Master Soo bans kung fu and martial arts from the village.
27c	1c	"Trial by Fury"	Written by : Johnny John-John Kearns; Storyboarded by : Tim Packford	March 3, 2008
Tobe plans to defeat Garu in the court of law.
28a	2a	"Unsinkable Pucca"	Written by : Doug Molitor; Storyboarded by : Sam To	March 10, 2008
Tobe plans to sink the Gigantic with Garu in it.
28b	2b	"Break My Day"	Written by : Doug Molitor; Storyboarded by : Dan Hughes	March 10, 2008
Garu discovers that his day is happening over and over again.
28c	2c	"Samba of Doom"	Written by : Johnny John-John Kearns; Storyboarded by : Dennis Crawford	March 10, 2008
Tobe plans to sabotage the Samba dance contest.
29a	3a	"Pucca's Fishy Tale"	Written by : Shane Simmons; Storyboarded by : Leah Waldron	March 24, 2008
Doga fish-naps all the merpeople of the ocean.
29b	3b	"Invincible Vengeance"	Story by : Jayson Thiessen; Teleplay by : Steve Sullivan; Storyboarded by : Clio Chiang	March 24, 2008
Tobe seeks advice from Heil Kick Yu.
29c	3c	"Dragon Player"	Written by : Shane Simmons; Storyboarded by : Gerry Fournier	March 24, 2008
A golden dragon kidnaps Pucca.
30a	4a	"Chop Chewie"	Written by : Jonathan Groves; Storyboarded by : Sam To	March 31, 2008
The Vagabonds bring a plague of termites to the village.
30b	4b	"Janitaurus"	Written by : Jack Alvino; Storyboarded by : Dan Hughes	March 31, 2008
Dada quits his job as a janitor and becomes a wrestler.
30c	4c	"Stop That Yang"	Written by : Johnny John-John Kearns; Storyboarded by : Dennis Crawford	March 31, 2008
The balance of Yin and Yang have gone screwy.
31a	5a	"Monster Truck Island"	Written by : Johnny John-John Kearns; Storyboarded by : Dan Hughes	April 21, 2008
Tex Lugie and Sloppy Sue are back after their ship crashes into the island. This time, they advertise for big trucks, convincing nearly everyone in Sooga Village to buy one. In no time, the town is clogged with traffic, noise, and smog, to which Pucca and Ching don't like.
31b	5b	"Astral Boy and Dream Girl"	Written by : Steve Sullivan; Storyboarded by : Jocelan Thiessen	April 21, 2008
Garu's astral self travels to learn the secret of enlightenment.
31c	5c	"Hex Door Neighbour"	Written by : Jonathan Groves; Storyboarded by : Clio Chiang	April 21, 2008
When Doga's van breaks down outside of the Goh-Rong, she decides to settle there instead of fixing it. However, in doing so she brings darkness and misery, killing off plant life, blocking the sun, and causing a threat to customers. However, her dark powers is no match for Pucca's love and light energies which she uses to undo the misery it caused. Despite having her van fixed, Doga is disgusted and decides to move away.
32	6	"Chef-Napped"	Written by : Steve Sullivan; Storyboarded by : Part 1–2: Tim Packford; Part 2–3: Sam To	June 16, 2008
Angered over not getting her noodles, Ring-Ring employs Dada and other villains (including The Vagabonds, Muji, Tobe and his ninja army) to kidnap the chefs in order to get her revenge and hoard all the noodles for herself. However, she and Dada pay for their mistake when Pucca, Garu, Abyo and Ching arrive to rescue them.
33a	7a	"Enter the Dragon Girls"	Written by : Mug Erskine-Kellie; Storyboarded by : Jocelan Thiessen	June 23, 2008
Ring Ring wants to join the Dragon Girls where Pucca and the other girls were in. She tries to compete against Pucca by doing a good deed, but she can't, only to unintentionally help Pucca earn more badges. Enraged, she tries to attack Pucca. Later, after being swept down river, she finally wins a badge before going over the waterfall.
33b	7b	"Hot and Bothered"	Written by : Mug Erskine-Kellie; Storyboarded by : Kenny Park	June 23, 2008
When Pucca falls ill with Flu Manchu, Ho travels to the fire swamps of Sooga to obtain the lava peppers needed to make the cure. There, he meets and falls in love with Hottie, Queen of the Fire Swamp.
33c	7c	"Stuck on Goo"	Written by : Shane Simmons; Storyboarded by : Tim Packford	June 23, 2008
Garu and Tobe accidentally gets stuck together after a laundry incident. As a result, the ninjas are stuck together back to back.
34a	8a	"Hooray for Bollywood"	Written by : Mug Erskine-Kellie; Storyboarded by : Rob Boutilier; Jayson Thiessen	June 30, 2008
Garu and Ssoso travel to India to find the Swami Soo to learn inner peace until Pucca pursues him. At the end Pucca and Garu sing.
34b	8b	"He Loves Me Not"	Written by : Johnny John-John Kearns; Storyboarded by : Clio Chiang	June 30, 2008
Pucca is devastated to see "Garu" in love with Ring Ring getting heartbroken as it leads to a wedding with a storm brewing. During the ceremony a wedding crasher arrives revealing to be Garu, he exposes the fake as Dada causing him to flee in fear and Pucca to get angry at Ring Ring's trickery. When Ring-Ring tries to marry an unwilling Garu by force just to hurt Pucca even more, Pucca ultimately snaps and unleashes supernatural weather powers against Ring Ring, taking her away. As Pucca continues to sob, Garu swallows his pride and bashfully gives her a flower bouquet which rekindles her love for him and the sun returns to Sooga Village.
34c	8c	"4 Eyes - 2 Minds"	Story by : Michael Lahay; Teleplay by : Shane Simmons; Storyboarded by : Mark Petlock	June 30, 2008
Chief possesses the wise turtle's glasses, making her a genius so she can win Tobe's heart.
35a	9a	"Ching It On"	Written by : Steve Sullivan; Storyboarded by : Gerry Fournier	July 7, 2008
Abyo joins the rugby club with Garu. Ching hopes to gain Abyo's affection by joining the cheerleading squad, but Ring-Ring rejects her and starts her own with Pucca. However, when Pucca and Ching antagonize Ring-Ring during the game, she enrages and attacks them both. Pucca kicks a football into her mouth and sends her flying over the goal post.
35b	9b	"Striking Out"	Written by : Mug Erskine-Kellie; Storyboarded by : Dan Hughes	July 7, 2008
Tobe fires his ninjas after making mistakes until they go looking for another job.
35c	9c	"Tomb It May Concern"	Story by : Michael Lahay; Teleplay by : Shane Simmons; Storyboarded by : Sam To	July 7, 2008
Kua returns and with the chefs in order to find the essence of 1,000 moons.
36a	10a	"Fab Abyo"	Written by : Mug Erskine-Kellie; Storyboarded by : Kenny Park	July 14, 2008
Three famous people come into town. They announce that they're looking for the chosen one, stating that the old chosen one got fat. They look all around Sooga Village, while insulting peoples' fashion choices. They say that the town is not the right place. Then Abyo jumped up from a group of girls and does his signature Hi-Yah, and starts flaunting his abs. Then they all shout that he is the one, while Abyo looks confused and says "Hiya". Starla walks up to him and says he is the "one", but Ring Ring doesn't believe them. The trio then tell her the story about their last master in the temple of Shallow and that Abyo is perfect to lead them. However, Ching isn't willing to give him up that easily and give Starla, the modeling director and make-up artist an extreme haircut. Abyo then tries to flaunt his abs again, which revealed he had put on weight and causes the trio to leave him.
36b	10b	"The Bride of Muji"	Written by : Mug Erskine-Kellie; Storyboarded by : Glenn Kirkpatrick; Mark Petlock	July 14, 2008
Muji creates a bride in Pucca(resembling the Bride of Frankenstein) and brings her to life. However, she's not interested in him, rather choosing to eat noodles and win the love of Garu.
36c	10c	"Full Moon Pucca"	Written by : Colin Yardley; Larry Raskin; Storyboarded by : Gerry Fournier	July 14, 2008
Pucca uses the full moon to release Garu's love side, but soon she starts getting tired of it.
37a	11a	"It's a Ring Ring Thing"	Story by : Greg Sullivan and Jayson Thiessen; Teleplay by : Johnny John-John Kearns; Storyboarded by : Gerry Fournier	July 21, 2008
Upon Ring Ring's realization that she may have a bad temper issue due to several meltdowns. She is forced to see Santa who separates her from her "succubus" form. While the nice and kind Ring-Ring frolics in the meadows, her succubus form hunts Pucca down, causing destruction and attacking everyone who stands in her way. When the evil Ring Ring finally confronts Pucca, she turns herself into a giant and attacks her. The only way the town will be restored is if Ring-Ring confronts her dark half and has it return to her body at once.
37b	11b	"Jingle Cans"	Written by : Johnny John-John Kearns; Storyboarded by : Sam To	July 21, 2008
The Vagabonds try to steal cans from a food drive, not knowing that the food is for them.
37c	11c	"Garu Hood"	Written by : Mug Erskine-Kellie; Storyboarded by : Dan Hughes	July 21, 2008
Garu Hood must battle a dragon in order to rescue the noodle bowl and Dada.
38a	12a	"Cuckoo Love"	Written by : Mug Erskine-Kellie; Storyboarded by : Clio Chiang	August 4, 2008
Ching's pet chicken, Won, falls in love with a cuckoo bird and flies away with it, leaving Ching being weak. Chang tries to replace it with a female duck, which makes it worse. However, a fight with the cuckoo bird makes Won realize how much she missed Ching and leaves him. Upon returning, she fights the female duck until she falls in love with the cuckoo bird. Won happily returns to the top of Ching's head, while the duck and cuckoo bird are enjoying their new lives in the clock.
38b	12b	"Double 'A' Attack"	Written by : Shane Simmons; Storyboarded by : Rob Boutilier	August 4, 2008
Santa and Doga get the wrong kind of batteries as Santa’s toys turned evil.
38c	12c	"Super Sooga Squad"	Written by : Mug Erskine-Kellie; Storyboarded by : Mark Petlock; Steve Lyons	August 4, 2008
Pucca and her friends become superheroes and battle Master Soo’s brother Mel.
39a	13a	"Tame That Toon"	Written by : Shane Simmons; Storyboarded by : Tim Packford	August 11, 2008
Ring-Ring travels to the past and teams up with her past self to erase Pucca from history but decides to erase Garu instead. So Pucca has to travel back in time to fix things, which she does by stopping Ring-Ring from erasing Garu and knocking her out of the movie with the pencil.
39b	13b	"Abra-Ca-Pucca"	Written by : Mug Erskine-Kellie; Storyboarded by : Jocelan Thiessen	August 11, 2008
While watching Santa's Magic Show, the magical hat hops away with a female rabbit planning to marry Garu. When Pucca confronts them, she beats up the female rabbit and turns her into a chocolate bunny. When Ching tries to use the wand to make Abyo fall in love, it turns them, Santa, Pucca and Garu into rabbits.
39c	13c	"Skip to My Loo"	Written by : Colin Yardley; Larry Raskin; Storyboarded by : Kenny Park	August 11, 2008
Master Loo returns to take the maidens on a date with Soo trying to ruin it.

=== Season 3: Love Recipe (2018–19) ===
No. overall	No. in season	Title	Written by	Original release date
40a	1a	"The Sooga Island Cooking Competition"	Written by : Storyboarded by :	December 10, 2018
A compromised cooking competition is hosted around Sooga Village by Dong King as a plan to get rid of the Goh-Rong restaurant.
40b	1b	"Enter: Ring Ring"	Written by : Storyboarded by :	December 10, 2018
The servants scramble around Sooga to find a lost can given to them by Dong King; Garu & Ring Ring get stuck in a giant spider's web and try to get out. Ring Ring falls in love with Garu.
40c	1c	"The Lucky Can"	Written by : Storyboarded by :	December 10, 2018
The Dong King Restaurant opens its millionth location in Sooga Village. Ring Ring tries to get Garu's attention by using a "lucky can" that brings people to the restaurant.
41a	2a	"Spring Mushrooms"	Written by : Storyboarded by :	December 17, 2018
The kids set out to find spring mushrooms, which makes the user bouncy when eaten. But Fyah also wants the treat!
41b	2b	"The Bodyguard Contest"	Written by : Storyboarded by :	December 17, 2018
Ring Ring creates a personal bodyguard competition, and wants to make sure that Garu wins! Too bad she didn't expect other contestants, including Pucca!
41c	2c	"Star Stickers"	Written by : Storyboarded by :	December 17, 2018
On the occasion of the 100th edition of the magazine "Martial Artist", one of the students of the martial arts academy in Sooga will be chosen for its cover. The person who wins the greatest number of stickers for good deeds will get the honor, and Abyo is trying to get more stars than Garu!
42a	3a	"The Goh-Rong Taste"	Written by : Storyboarded by :	December 24, 2018
Fyah bribes two culinary critics on giving a bad review on Goh-Rong's food.
42b	3b	"Golden Ninja Tobe"	Written by : Storyboarded by :	December 24, 2018
Chang's ninja academy is in danger! The prickly monster has returned and must be fought with soft dumplings. The secret ingredient, however, is in the Delicious Star. Pucca and her friends have a mission to fulfill! But things get complicated when Tobe touches the star and becomes covered with its power.
42c	3c	"Attempt of Casano"	Written by : Storyboarded by :	December 24, 2018
Ring Ring tasks Casano at making Pucca fall in love with him, so she can have an easier time to catching Garu's attention..
43a	4a	"Garu the Robot"	Written by : Storyboarded by :	December 31, 2018
Ring Ring commissions a robot that resembles Garu in order to distract Pucca from the real one.
43b	4b	"Pucca's Dumpling"	Written by : Storyboarded by :	December 31, 2018
Pucca makes Garu-shaped dumplings, but when Ring Ring tastes one of them, she wants to make her own!
43c	4c	"Go! Mask Woman"	Written by : Storyboarded by :	December 31, 2018
Ring Ring is trying to get her facial mask off, but in doing so, she creates a super heroine alter-ego named "Mask Woman".
44a	5a	"Secret of Dandy"	Written by : Storyboarded by :	January 7, 2019
Dandy hides a secret: he stays in Sooga to learn the legendary secret of martial arts, and in the meantime peels potatoes at a restaurant.
44b	5b	"Finding Honey Dumplings"	Written by : Storyboarded by :	January 7, 2019
Grandma cannot eat dumplings because she has only one tooth left. The chefs want to prepare dumplings with legendary honey for her, which she will be able to eat safe, so Pucca and her friends must find it.
44c	5c	"The Sooga Island Alien"	Written by : Storyboarded by :	January 7, 2019
The secret agent came to Sooga Island in search of aliens, and mistakes Pucca for one of its members.
45a	6a	"Garu and Tobe Switch!!"	Written by : Storyboarded by :	January 14, 2019
Garu and Tobe are struck by lightning during a duel, which results in them switching bodies.
45b	6b	"Boo! Shriek!"	Written by : Storyboarded by :	January 14, 2019
Fyah hires three brothers who have supernatural abilities that can suck off somebody's optimism, and use them to take down Garu.
45c	6c	"Etiquette Class"	Written by : Storyboarded by :	January 14, 2019
Bruce tries to teach Ring Ring some humility after seeing her acting spoiled.
46a	7a	"The Dance of the Ruby Slippers"	Written by : Storyboarded by :	January 21, 2019
Master Soo accidentally lets loose a pair of cursed shoes that when worn, it forces its user to dance non-stop.
46b	7b	"Graffiti is Alive"	Written by : Storyboarded by :	January 21, 2019
Ring Ring uses a special pencil in order to make a graffiti of her and Garu that Pucca cannot erase.
46c	7c	"Master Chef of Dong King?"	Written by : Storyboarded by :	January 21, 2019
A mysterious chef is helping out Dong King, and Dada has gone missing at Goh-Rong at the same time.
47a	8a	"The Table Ghost"	Written by : Storyboarded by :	February 11, 2019
When Pucca helps Granny out, she rewards Pucca with an old table which is believed to be made by a rabbit.
47b	8b	"Tobe's Useless Skill"	Written by : Storyboarded by :	February 11, 2019
When Tobe decided he was done with jobs at Dong King's restaurant, Fyah tries to bribe Tobe with new Dong King special devices.
47c	8c	"Pit-a-Pat Pendant"	Written by : Storyboarded by :	February 11, 2019
Wanting her love to be fulfilled, Pucca receives a special pendant that will make someone's wish come true if three petals appear. r love to be recognize. However, Ring-Ring attempts to steal it for herself.
48a	9a	"Goh-Rong's Special Guests"	Written by : Storyboarded by :	February 18, 2019
Fyah is in danger of losing his job and needs to do things by himself. When Fyah hears of Goh-Rong having special guests arriving soon, he sees the chance to prove to Dong King that he can do things on his own. With a disguise on hand, he will try to ruin this special event on his own.
48b	9b	"Love Letter"	Written by : Storyboarded by :	February 18, 2019
Pucca decides she wants to write a letter to Garu to express her love for him. However, Ring Ring wants to do the same. Both women will compete for a man's heart with a love letter.
48c	9c	"Amnesia"	Written by : Storyboarded by :	February 18, 2019
Ring-Ring orders a special hammer that causes somebody to have amnesia. She uses it on Pucca so she will stay away from Garu forever. When Pucca does not remember a thing, devastated Garu, Abyo, and Ching try to recover Pucca's lost memories.
49a	10a	"The Cat Bandits"	Written by : Storyboarded by :	February 25, 2019
There have been thieves in the area that is stealing people's food stock, including three cats that head from house to house to steal. They later find Goh-Rong restaurant, thinking it a perfect place to steal best-quality foods.
49b	10b	"Into Pucca's Dream"	Written by : Storyboarded by :	February 25, 2019
Pucca and friends were on the flower field to relax until she sniffs an unusually flower that makes her unconscious. Master Soo shows up and tells them that they must enter Pucca's dreams to stop her from finishing her dream; if not, she will sleep forever.
49c	10c	"Abyo the Villain"	Written by : Storyboarded by :	February 25, 2019
Abyo reads a comic book and thinks it is better to be a villain since they seem better than being the hero. Fyah takes notice of this and tries to train Abyo to be a villain to stop the Goh-Rong restaurant. Abyo takes the offer and tries to become a villain instead.
50a	11a	"The Beauty Competition"	Written by : Storyboarded by :	March 4, 2019
Pucca and Ring-Ring decide to compete against each other to see who knows beauty more. They are judged by the best hair cutter in Sooga named Siva.
50b	11b	"Depressed Bruce?"	Written by : Storyboarded by :	March 4, 2019
Abyo is worried that his father, Bruce, has been in depression the last few days. With the help of his friends, they will try to cheer Bruce up.
50c	11c	"The Heart Gourd"	Written by : Storyboarded by :	March 4, 2019
Upon having a meal, Master Soo leaves behind a weird gourd and Dada notices it. Dada asks Pucca to run after Master Soo to return it. Master Soo returns to look for it, but Pucca has left. He hopes Pucca does not open it, but she does and all of her alter ego come out. Garu and Master Soo have to work together and catch all of Pucca's alter ego before things go worse.
51a	12a	"The Punching Bag Fairy"	Written by : Storyboarded by :	March 11, 2019
Abyo was done with always losing to Garu and wanted to beat him at least once. Abyo decided to do late night training sections. When Abyo discovers an old punching bag, a fairy comes out of and tells him that he may have a wish. However, Abyo starts to use the fairy everyday for his selfish desires.
51b	12b	"Love Bracelet"	Written by : Storyboarded by :	March 11, 2019
Abyo shows Ring-Ring with a secret tool called love bracelet, which allows the user to connect with somebody's heart and forces them to love that person back. Ring-Ring finds a way to use it on Garu and finally thinks she has her way. Pucca soon realizes the bracelet was the cause of Garu's new actions and does what she can to stop it.
51c	12c	"The Magic Duel"	Written by : Storyboarded by :	March 11, 2019
Master Kang comes to see Master Soo to face in a duel and see who has the better proteges. Master Soo lied about having his own proteges, then recruites Pucca and Ring Ring to take part in this duel. He will teach the ways of magic to duel.
52a	13a	"The Batter Master"	Written by : Storyboarded by :	March 18, 2019
Linguini feels he needs to redeem himself and leaves the restaurant until he proves he is worthy to cook once more.
52b–52c	13b–13c	"The Disappearance of Goh-Rong"	Written by : Storyboarded by :	March 18, 2019
Part 1: Dong King was sick of Fyah and the rest of his crew's constant failures, so he replaces them with somebody who is more worthy. A man named Edward attempts to get rid of Goh-Rong and makes it disappear. Part 2': With the restaurant disappeared, Pucca is sad that her uncles, the restaurant, and Garu cannot be found anywhere. However, when Pucca finds out the identity of the responsible person, she takes action with Abyo and Ching by her side.
53a	14a	"Food Triathlon"	Written by : Storyboarded by :	August 1, 2019
The villagers of Sooga Village are ready to compete Food Triathlon. Whoever wins the race can have any wish they desire. However, certain "obstacles" like to be in the way of other's wishes.
53b	14b	"Treasure Hunt"	Written by : Storyboarded by :	August 1, 2019
Three pirates arrive on Sooga Island to find the hidden treasure that lies there. However, they have lost their treasure map. The pirates travel far and wide without their map only to be lost and confused.
53c	14c	"Tobe the Nice Guy"	Written by : Storyboarded by :	August 1, 2019
After Tobe ate some fruits, he becomes nice and starts to help everybody against his will. Frustrated and wants to be evil, he is soon told by Master Soo how to fix it. Tobe is shocked that he must overcome this unfortunate trail.
54a	15a	"Abyo's Diet"	Written by : Storyboarded by :	August 8, 2019
Abyo becomes addicted to pudding and does no seem to know how to stop himself from eating it, causing him to lose his martial arts abilities. Pucca and friends must help Abyo overcome his mistake and start to lose weight if he wants to do martial arts once more.
54b	15b	"The Chefs in Love"	Written by : Storyboarded by :	August 8, 2019
Dong King is once again irritated by all of his servants' failures, so he starts to consider to fire all of them, but Casano had an idea: the art of seduction. If the chefs were focused on a woman, their bond may fall apart due to becoming competitive to win somebody's love.
54c	15c	"Ring Ring's Way of Making a Friend"	Written by : Storyboarded by :	August 8, 2019
Ring Ring had the idea that if she has a friend like Ching, she will be able to be closer to Garu. With this thought in mind, Ring Ring sets up a party to get herself close to Ching. Pucca shows up to this party as well, which Ring-Ring is not impressed.
55a	16a	"Garu the Movie Star"	Written by : Storyboarded by :	August 23, 2019
A famous movie director comes to Sooga Island and wants to make Garu the star of his new movie. Even if Garu refuses to take part, the director still continues to film the movie anyway. With Pucca being the new directors assistant, they try to make this movie.
55b	16b	"Finding Won"	Written by : Storyboarded by :	August 23, 2019
The three pirates come to Sooga Island once again, this time capturing Won for their selfish wish, leaving Ching to become weak without Won on her head. Pucca and friends must recuse Won before things go worse.
55c	16c	"The Maiden, Awakened"	Written by : Storyboarded by :	August 23, 2019
Pucca and friends are cleaning Master Soo's storage house which allow them to ride on Master Soo's cloud. While in the middle of cleaning, Abyo accidentally ripped a scroll with a woman on it. The woman on the scroll comes out and wants to find Master Soo.
56a	17a	"The Chefs' Vacation"	Written by : Storyboarded by :	August 28, 2019
After the chefs "won" a contest on the beach, they decided to go there, but seem to not remember a certain detail. Pucca struggles to run the restaurant by herself and seeks help to try and maintain the restaurant.
56b	17b	"The Legendary Animal, Yeti"	Written by : Storyboarded by :	August 28, 2019
On the snowy mountain, Pucca decides to chase after Garu once again while he tries to snowboard, where he finds himself in a bad situation. This ends up leading him to meeting an unknown person named Ring Voy. She seems to be obsessed with the legend of the Yeti that is supposed to live on the snowy mountain area. After Pucca catches up, the three of them encounter the yeti. Ring Voy excited offered treats, but the yeti seems to be mad when they feed it candy.
56c	17c	"Love Soup"	Written by : Storyboarded by :	August 28, 2019
After Pucca heard about a legendary flower and whoever eats something with the flower inside will fall in love, she picks the flowers and makes a soup to feed to Garu to receive his love. However, Pucca does not seem to pay attention to how much of the flowers she puts into her soup, causing the island end up in a "chaos" of love.
57a	18a	"Ring Ring at the Martial Arts Studio"	Written by : Storyboarded by :	September 3, 2019
While watching a lesson at the martial arts dojo, Ring Ring sees Pucca and Garu practicing some moves together. Jealous, she decides to join as a student. However, she realizes that practicing is not that easy and she decides to "trick" them by using a high-tech artificial intelligence suit, which allows her to become an expert in martial arts.
57b	18b	"Wind Boy's Time Machine"	Written by : Storyboarded by :	September 3, 2019
The peculiar inventor of the island of Sooga, invents a time machine in which Pucca and her friends travel to past times despite his warnings.
57c	18c	"Hip Hip Hooray!"	Written by : Storyboarded by :	September 3, 2019
A new seasoning made from mushrooms has been invented, and whoever eats it shouts "Hooray" continuously for nothing. Fyah sees the usefulness of it and provides it to the chefs at the Goh-Rong. The three continue to shout "Hooray!". They get distracted and that prevents them from cooking properly. Customers leave one by one when their food is not served. Will the Goh-Rong close due to this new obstacle?
58a	19a	"Plunger Soda"	Written by : Storyboarded by :	September 11, 2019
Uncle Dumpling is in terrible pain, and Linguin and Ho look at him helplessly with worried expressions. Dada, seeing him, believes that Uncle Dumpling has some kind of serious illness. But it turns out that Uncle Dumpling is simply suffering from constipation. The only way to cure it is to climb the snowy mountain peak and bring back the plunger soda.
58b	19b	"The Search for Rice"	Written by : Storyboarded by :	September 11, 2019
In order to prevent the Goh-Rong from getting the main ingredient for his fried rice, Fyah stops Pucca and Garu from getting the rice. Tobe disguises himself as Master Mee and orders Pucca and Garu to do some strange tasks to waste their time. Meanwhile, Fyah's henchmen go to Master Mee's field to take all the rice.
58c	19c	"A Scary Woman"	Written by : Storyboarded by :	September 11, 2019
A crazy admirer of Casano, Smell, arrives on the island of Sooga. She wants to kidnap Casano and take him with her, but in the process, she falls in love with Uncle Dumpling, Bruce, and other men from Sooga Island, kidnapping them one by one. Even the almighty Garu, which arouses Pucca's wrath.
59a	20a	"Super Banana Donut"	Written by : Storyboarded by :	September 19, 2019
Fyah unleashes a new addition to their menu. A special treat with that makes the townsfolk addicted and turns them into a monkeys. It's up to Pucca and Dada to stop them.
59b	20b	"The Unbearable Itch"	Written by : Storyboarded by :	September 19, 2019
Fyah enlist Ayo to release a mosquito on Goh-Rong chefs to render the chefs unable to cook.
59c	20c	"Valentine's Day"	Written by : Storyboarded by :	September 19, 2019
For the Valentine's Day celebration, Master Soo devises a chocolate event. Pucca decides to prepare an artisan chocolate for Garu; Ring Ring, jealous, also tries. To get the best chocolate, they compete to get to the fountain from which she flows. After all kinds of struggles, each one manages to make her own chocolate. However, Master Soo, who is holding the competition, does not like any of them, they are very vulgar, and the competition is quite hectic.
60a	21a	"The Basketball Competition"	Written by : Storyboarded by :	September 26, 2019
Ring Ring watches Pucca and her friends playing basketball, and sees Pucca and Garu high five each other, which sparks her jealousy. She sets up a high-tech basketball court in front of the Dong King and invites Pucca and her friends to play. But the high-tech equipment moves the ball and does all sorts of other tricks, making the game rigged and chaotic. Pucca continues to play in good faith without giving up until the end.
60b	21b	"Soozilla"	Written by : Storyboarded by :	September 26, 2019
The legendary beast, Soozilla, emerges from the ocean and enters Sooga Island. Garu disappears at the same time the beast arrives, also kidnapping Ring Ring. All the inhabitants of Sooga Island, including Pucca, join forces to fight Soozilla, regardless of the Goh-Rong's team and the Dong King's team. Will they be able to fight against the terrifying monster?
60c	21c	"AI Cook"	Written by : Storyboarded by :	September 26, 2019
After watching Alpha Cook triumph on tv, Fyah challenges it to bring fame for the Dong King Restaurant.
61a	22a	"The Alien Prince in Love"	Written by : Storyboarded by :	October 4, 2019
Ring Ring has been set up on a blind date to meet Prince Octo. But the alien prince has set his eyes on Pucca.
61b	22b	"Garu in Jail"	Written by : Storyboarded by :	October 4, 2019
Garu, tired of being chased by Pucca, decides to lock himself in the prison to meditate in peace. He originally wanted to stay there briefly, finish his musings and be on his way, but Pucca breaks the key as he tries to get him out of it. Garu stays in jail for longer than he intended. There he meets a pirate, Munch, who eats a sweet potato in the state. After consuming it, Munch's stomach begins to rot, endangering everyone in and near the cell.
61c	22c	"The Suspicious Games"	Written by : Storyboarded by :	October 4, 2019
Two con artists arrive on Sooga Island duping the inhabitants. But Pucca will triumph.
62a	23a	"The Dong King Mascot"	Written by : Storyboarded by :	October 11, 2019
Ring Ring assigns Fyah to promote the restaurant with a panda costume and soon starts to enjoy the fame that comes with it.
62b	23b	"Trick or Treat"	Written by : Storyboarded by :	October 11, 2019
Pucca and her friends dress up to celebrate the party. They wander around town to get sweets, but what's wrong with Garu?
62c	23c	"Battle of the Psychic Powers"	Written by : Storyboarded by :	October 11, 2019
The Sooga villagers have psychic powers due to a large alien asteroid falling in front of the Goh-Rong. The powers wreak havoc in the city: in particular, Garu turns invisible and disappears, so Pucca tries to destroy the asteroid and get rid of all the powers for good. But Fyah gains a power that surpasses Pucca's, putting her in danger.
63a	24a	"The Goblin Cape"	Written by : Storyboarded by :	October 17, 2019
The mysterious shirt of a goblin, gives immense strength to the person who wears it, but also becomes violent and aggressive. The Sooga Islanders who wear her behave recklessly and cause a nuisance.
63b	24b	"Channel Goh-Rong"	Written by : Storyboarded by :	October 17, 2019
Goh-Rong's chefs start broadcasting live from their kitchen. Seeing how people react to their videos and the huge number of likes, chefs are immersed in that world. They start to care more about their popularity than their dishes. In fact, they get so obsessed with gaining likes that they don't realize that many of their loyal customers are leaving.
63c	24c	"Villains, Unite!"	Written by : Storyboarded by :	October 17, 2019
All the so-called villains who were defeated by the seemingly invincible Pucca and Garu decide to join forces: Dong King, Tobe and his ninjas, and the pirates. They devise a plan to discover the secret treasure that is supposedly hidden in the Goh-Rong. Will they succeed?
64a	25a	"Winter in Sooga Island"	Written by : Storyboarded by :	October 24, 2019
It's the holidays in Sooga! Santa arrives with the presents to give to everyone, but a fracas caused by ice skating makes the presents vanish.
64b	25b	"A Warrior's Credentials"	Written by : Storyboarded by :	October 24, 2019
64c	25c	"Ring Ring the Cow"	Written by : Storyboarded by :	October 24, 2019
65a	26a	"The Dragon Tail"	Written by : Storyboarded by :	October 31, 2019
Garu is sick, and a dragon's tail is necessary to cure him. Once Pucca, Ching, and Abyo found a baby dragon, they think it is too cute to cut its tail.
65b–65c	26b–26c	"Dong King vs. Goh Rong"	Written by : Storyboarded by :	October 31, 2019

== See also ==
- Pucca
