= Honeycomb Beat =

2006 video game

- European packaging artwork
- Developer: Hudson Soft
- Publishers: JP/NA: Hudson Soft; PAL: Rising Star Games
- Platforms: Nintendo DS, Mobile
- Release: DS: JP: August 10, 2006; NA: March 27, 2007; EU: October 5, 2007; AU: October 25, 2007; Mobile; 2007
- Genre: Puzzle
- Mode: Single player

Honeycomb Beat, known in Japan as Nōnai Kakusei Honeycomb Beat, (Note: Japanese: 脳内覚醒ハニカムビート, Hepburn: Nōnai Kakusei Hanikamu Bīto; lit. "Intracerebral Awakening Honeycomb Beat") is a puzzle video game developed by Hudson Soft for the Nintendo DS and mobile phones. It features touch screen gameplay and more than 200 unique puzzles. In the game, players use a stylus or their fingers to clear puzzles.

== Reception ==
Reception

Aggregate score
Aggregator	Score
Metacritic	61/100

Review scores
Publication	Score
1Up.com	B+
Edge	5/10
Eurogamer	6/10
Famitsu	29/40
Game Informer	7/10
GameDaily	3/10
GameSpot	6.9/10
GameSpy	2/5
GameZone	8.5/10
IGN	5.5/10
Nintendo Life	6/10
Nintendo World Report	6.5/10
Pocket Gamer	2.5/5
411Mania	6/10

The DS version received "mixed" reviews according to the review aggregation website Metacritic. In Japan, Famitsu gave it a score of two sevens, one eight, and one seven for a total of 29 out of 40. GamePro said of the game, "If tile-pattern puzzles are your cup of tea, this game might be the honey." (Note: GamePro gave the game two 3.5/5 scores for graphics and fun factor, 3.75/5 for sound, and 4/5 for control.)
