= Colour Cross =

2008 video game

- European cover art
- Developer: Little Worlds Studio
- Publishers: EU: Rising Star Games; NA: Zoo Digital
- Platform: Nintendo DS
- Release: EU: December 5, 2008; NA: May 25, 2010
- Genre: Puzzle
- Mode: Single-player

Colour Cross, released in North America as Color Cross, is a puzzle video game for the Nintendo DS by French developer Little Worlds Studio. It is a derivative of nonogram puzzles, but requires the user to complete grids using multiple colours with no blank spaces.

The game contains 150 puzzles split between ten categories. The player's time is recorded, with time penalties incurred for mistakes made.

== Reception ==
Colour Cross received average reception, with a score of 72/100 on Metacritic.
