= Valhalla Knights =

2006 video game

- Developer(s): K2 LLC
- Publisher(s): JP: Marvelous Entertainment; NA: Xseed Games; PAL: Rising Star Games
- Director(s): Mitsuo Kodama
- Producer(s): Mitsuo Kodama; Yoshifumi Hashimoto
- Designer(s): Kazuhiko Yoshioka
- Programmer(s): Yukitoshi Tsuzuki
- Writer(s): Katsuhiro Mitsuyasu; Takehiro Yamashita; Masami Kokuryo; Yukino Mizoguchi
- Series: Valhalla Knights
- Platform(s): PlayStation Portable
- Release: JP: August 31, 2006; NA: April 17, 2007; AU: August 30, 2007; EU: September 7, 2007
- Genre(s): Action role-playing
- Mode(s): Single-player, multiplayer

Valhalla Knights (Note: Japanese: ヴァルハラ ナイツ, Hepburn: Varuhara Naitsu) is a 2006 fantasy action role-playing game developed by K2 LLC and published by Marvelous Entertainment for Sony PlayStation Portable.

== Story ==
In a realm forgotten by history, humans, elves, halflings and other assorted races lived together in harmony in an untainted paradise surrounded by thick green forests and crystal clear streams. However, this tranquility was abruptly shattered by the roar of demons as the Dark Lord returned to reclaim his throne as the ruler of these lands. This set off a series of bloody battles as all races become ensnared in the violent conflict.

After years of fierce fighting, the Dark Lord was eventually sealed away by the hands of as hero named Rulzult. However, the damage had been done. All the demon blood spilled during the war caused the land to become cursed and the sky lost its light. This once serene paradise became known as "the Cursed Land." It entrapped its inhabitants and filled them with despair, causing each waking moment to feel like an eternity.

One day, a brave youth awakens in this land, unable to recall who he/she is and having no recollection of his/her past. The story continues, following the unknown youth on a journey of discovery to find his/her lost memories and determine the future of this forsaken land.

== Gameplay ==
The player fights against monsters to obtain new items and equipment. Five races are available for your character: human, dwarf, halfling, elf, and machine. Additionally, four initial job classes are available—Fighter, Mage, Priest, and Thief. Additional job classes can be acquired through job cards dropped by monsters in certain areas; these include Anchor, Knight, Samurai, and Ninja. At any time, each character may pick up to two job subclasses in addition to their main job class, and certain attributes of that subclass will carry over into gameplay (such as a Fighter being able to cast spells with a Mage or Priest subclass). Actions during combat will change depending on the weapons equipped, and each of the numerous weapon types is only equipable to a certain subset of job classes. After building up a gauge through combat actions, a character can perform a special attack. Different special attacks can be performed when equipping different weapons.

== Reception ==
The game received "mixed or average" reviews according to the review aggregation website Metacritic. GameSpot and IGN criticized the game's story, and IGN considered the side quests to be unclear.

Reception

Aggregate score
Aggregator	Score
Metacritic	53/100

Review scores
Publication	Score
Destructoid	3/10
GameSpot	5.6/10
GameZone	8.2/10
IGN	5.3/10

== Sequels ==
Valhalla Knights 2 released for the PlayStation Portable in North America on October 1, 2008, this installment expanded on the previous game by adding more races and improving the combat system.

Valhalla Knights: Eldar Saga was released for Wii in North America on September 29, 2009. The game featured online cooperative play.

Valhalla Knights 3 was released on the PlayStation Vita in May 2013.
