= Yuko Shimizu =

Hello Kitty creator

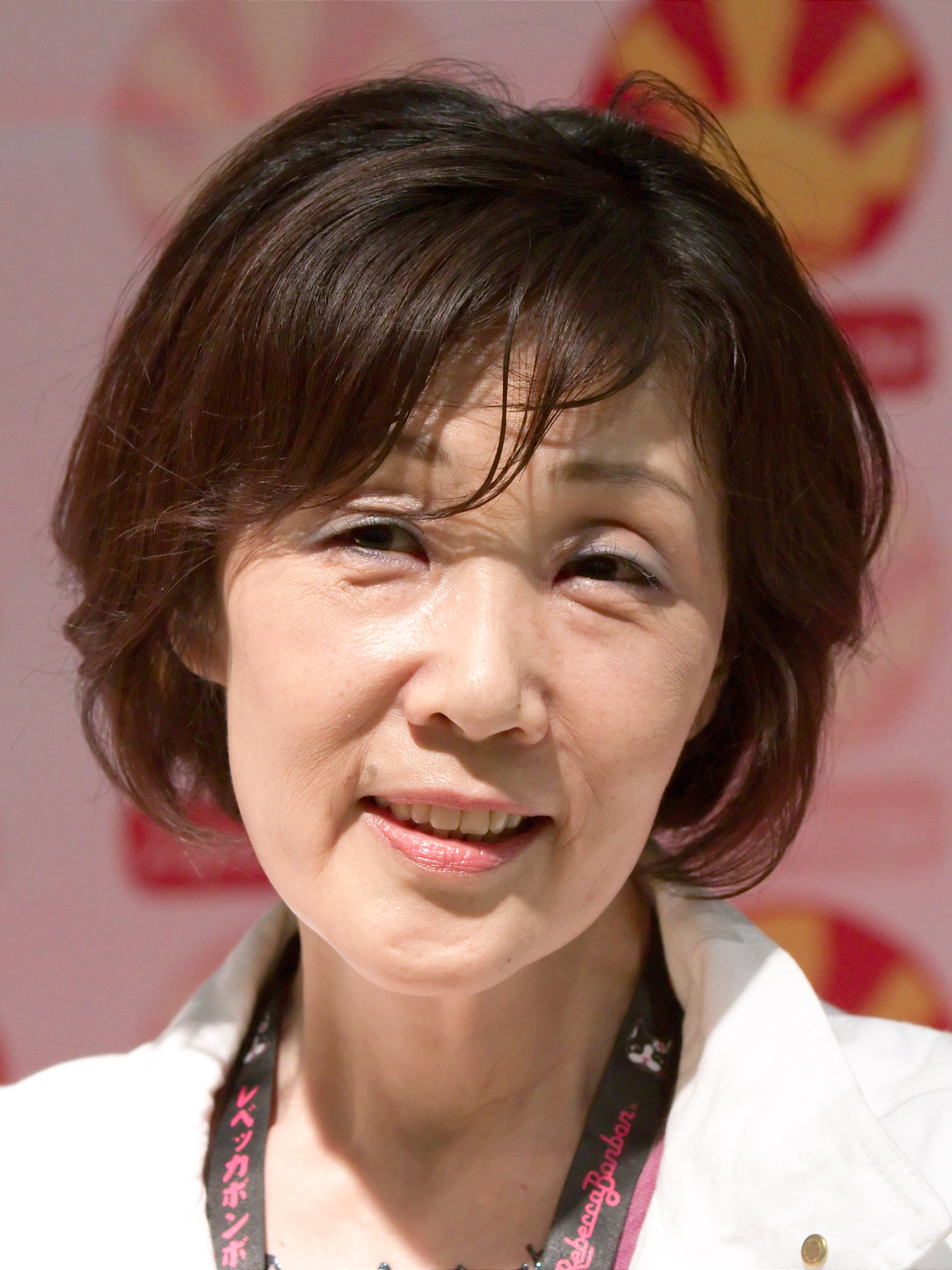
- Shimizu at the 2010 Japan Expo
- Born: November 1, 1946 (age 80); Kyoto, Japan
- Education: Musashino Art University
- Known for: Designing Hello Kitty

Yuko Shimizu (清水 侑子, Shimizu Yūko; born 1 November 1946) is a Japanese designer who created Hello Kitty.

== Early life and education ==
Shimizu was born in Kyoto, Japan, on November 1, 1946. She attended Musashino Art University, and joined Sanrio after graduation.

== Career ==
=== Hello Kitty ===
In 1974, Shimizu made the original design for Hello Kitty, whose fictional birthdate is November 1, the same as Shimizu's. Hello Kitty is Sanrio's most successful and best known character. Shimizu based her name on Alice's black 'Kitty' from Through the Looking-Glass. Hello Kitty was designed to be a kawaii (cute) symbol to be used on merchandise. In 1975, the design made her debut in Japan with her image on a coin purse.

Sanrio has said Hello Kitty has no mouth because she "speaks from the heart" and that she is "Sanrio's ambassador to the world who isn't bound to one certain language."

=== At Sanrio ===
In 1973, Shimizu designed the first original Sanrio character, Coro Chan, a bear. Before designing Hello Kitty Shimizu also did designs of fruits for Sanrio. Other characters designed by Shimizu for Sanrio include Bunny & Matty (バニー＆マッティ), a rabbit and mice, and Yachiyo Charmer (八千代チャーマー), a girl wearing a kimono, all from 1974.

=== After Sanrio ===
Shimizu left Sanrio in 1976 to get married. She has been working as a freelance designer ever since. She did not make a lot of money from Hello Kitty.

The other characters she has created include Angel Cat Sugar and Rebecca Bonbon. She has also published some picture books.
