= Poncho (video game) =

2015 video game

- Developer(s): Delve Interactive
- Publisher(s): Rising Star Games
- Engine: Unity
- Platform(s): Windows; OS X; Linux; PlayStation 4; Wii U
- Release: Windows, OS X, Linux, PlayStation 4 November 3, 2015; Wii U August 18, 2016
- Genre(s): Action
- Mode(s): Single-player

Poncho is an action game developed by Delve Interactive, released for Windows, OS X, and PlayStation 4 on November 3, 2015, and Wii U on August 18, 2016. A version for the PlayStation Vita was announced, but was cancelled.

== Gameplay ==
The game consists of a robot wearing a poncho. Humanity has disappeared and only robots remain. Players make their mission through the world of pixelated parallax to find Poncho's maker and save humanity. The gameplay consists of a 2D platformer with different layer of depth, being able to get closer or further away.

== Reception ==
The PC version has been reviewed on Destructoid with a score of 60/100. The PS4 version has been reviewed on Hardcore Gamer with a score of 80/100. On PSU.com, also for the PS4 version, the game was reviewed with a score of 80/100. On GameCrate, the game's review score was 78/100. On Push Square, the review score was 50/100. Hardcore Gamer compared the game to Fez.

The game was a commercial failure. In a blog post at Gamasutra published over a year after the game's release, Dan Hayes, a developer at Delve stated their company had "not yet made a single penny from Poncho". He further blamed Rising Star Games for a lack of support; the publisher responded by stating that Delve had consistently missed milestones.
