= Angel Cat Sugar =

Fictional character created by Yuko Shimizu

Angel Cat Sugar is the name of a fictional feline character created by Yuko Shimizu in 2002. The character is a white female kitten with a crown on her head and angel wings on her back and is from the fictional Angel World. Merchandise depicting the character includes products such as plush dolls, lunch boxes, towels, and books.

== Characters ==
=== Sugar family ===
- Angel Cat Sugar: (born May 17) Called "Sugar" or "Sugar-chan" in Japanese, she is the princess of Angel World. She is depicted as a white kitten wearing a crown and possessing angel wings. She possessed the power to heal the hearts of others and make everyone happy.
- Fennel: Angel Cat Sugar’s father. A veterinarian.
- Mint: Angel Cat Sugar’s mother. A nurse.

=== Friends ===
- Basil: A tomboyish girl angel. Likes growing flowers. Wears pink.
- Thyme: A cheerful boy angel. Cheers bashful sugar. Wears purple.
- Parsley: A smart boy angel. Can be fussy at times. Wears green.

== Books ==
There have been several books released in the Angel Cat Sugar franchise. There have been four books released in Japan through Yanagihara Publishing that were written and illustrated by Shimizu. In the United States the series is published through Scholastic Inc and is composed of eleven titles.

=== Japanese titles ===
- Bashful Sugar (June, 2005)
- Sugar and the Precious Eggs (December, 2005)
- Sugar and the Little Squirrel (July, 2006）
- Sugar and the Winter Gift (April, 2006)

=== English titles ===
- A New Friend
- A Special Easter
- A Wish for a Wand
- Birthday Party Surprise
- Merry Christmas, Sugar!
- Spring Picnic
- Star of the Ballet
- Sugar Loves Valentine’s Day
- Sugar’s Yummy Fall
- Sweet School Day
- Tea Party

== Games ==
In October 2009 a game was released for the Nintendo DS and PC titled Angel Cat Sugar in the UK and Germany and Angel Cat Sugar och stormkungen in Sweden. Gameplay includes mini-games and puzzles and was targeted at pre-teens.
