= Valhalla Knights 2 =

2008 video game

- Developer: K2
- Publishers: JP: Marvelous Entertainment; NA: Marvelous Entertainment USA; EU: Rising Star Games
- Writer: Miwa Shouda
- Composer: Shoujirou Nakaoka
- Series: Valhalla Knights
- Platform: PlayStation Portable
- Release: JP: May 29, 2008; NA: October 1, 2008; AU: June 18, 2009; EU: June 26, 2009
- Genre: Role-playing video game
- Modes: Single-player, multiplayer

Valhalla Knights 2 (ヴァルハラ ナイツ, Varuhara Naitsu Ni) is a role-playing video game developed by K2 and published by Marvelous Entertainment for the PlayStation Portable. It is the sequel to Valhalla Knights.

== Plot ==
Every 1000 years, the Goddess of Judgement punishes mankind for their ways. This time, however, a witch fought her but failed. In her attempt, the witch managed to destroy one of the Goddess' wings and thus forced the Goddess to hide and recover, as her feathers cursed the land with monsters. 1000 years after the battle, the cursed land is trying to hunt down the cause of the suffering and thus the hero/heroine's adventure begins.

== Gameplay ==
The player can explore its vast playable area and try to improve his/her battle party. The sequel adds new races, weapons, objectives and more. Multiplayer includes 6 vs. 6 battles and online Co-op and versus.

== Reception ==
Reception

Aggregate score
Aggregator	Score
Metacritic	50/100

Review scores
Publication	Score
GameSpot	3.5/10
IGN	5/10
RPGamer	1/5
RPGFan	83/100

The game received "mixed or average" reviews according to the review aggregation website Metacritic.
