= Dungeon Maker: Hunting Ground =

2006 video game

- Developer: Global A Entertainment
- Publishers: JP: Taito; NA: Xseed Games
- Platform: PlayStation Portable
- Release: JP: September 28, 2006; NA: June 19, 2007
- Genre: Role-playing
- Modes: Single-player, multiplayer

Dungeon Maker: Hunting Ground (Note: Chronicle of Dungeon Maker (クロニクル オブ ダンジョンメーカー, Kuronikuru obu Danjonmēkā)) is a role-playing video game developed by Global A Entertainment for the PlayStation Portable. It was released in Japan on September 28, 2006 under the title Chronicle of Dungeon Maker by Taito, it was later released June 19, 2007 by Xseed Games in the United States.

== Story ==
In an effort to protect a small town from attacks by monsters and demons, a novice "dungeon maker" has decided to create a dungeon in a nearby cave in order to lure the monsters away from the town itself. Conceptually, the hope is that such creatures will find the dungeon appealing and hence settle there, rather than roaming about. The dungeon architect can then venture into the dungeon and exterminate them.

As the dungeon grows larger and deeper, more powerful foes are expected to take up residence. Ultimately, the dungeon maker (played by the player) intends to attract a legendary foe, the "Wandering Demon", whose defeat will hopefully lead to long-term peace for the region.

== Gameplay ==
The game is split up into days. The player begins each day in a town, and may buy and sell items, obtain quests from the town's residents, and otherwise prepare. Following this, the player enters the dungeon. Once in the dungeon, the player battles any monsters that have moved in and can also expand the dungeon using available dungeon construction modules. After exiting or running out of health, the player can again perform town activities and then rest for the night, at which point in time the dungeon is re-populated.

Much of the game revolves around completing main and side quests for the town residents. These quests involve either defeating a specific foe, or retrieving a certain object (either found in a chest or dropped by a defeated enemy). Quest foes will only be encountered in the dungeon once the player builds appropriate rooms, or otherwise enhances the layout of a given level to a certain point. Because the key dungeon building blocks are themselves often given as quest rewards (particularly staircases allowing the dungeon to be made deeper), players are forced to expand the dungeon levels in order to progress.

The role-playing elements themselves are relatively light, with no character appearance customization other than equipment, and no experience system. Instead, players improve their character's statistics by eating a daily meal using ingredients harvested from defeated foes. The exact increases earned depend on the recipe, with more powerful recipes leading to greater enhancements. Since players can only eat once per day, performance increases accumulate only gradually.

== Reception ==
Dungeon Maker: Hunting Ground received praise for its unique premise and concept. Nonetheless, reviewers did note that the game became relatively repetitious after a period of time, with slow pacing in parts.

GameSpot observed, "You'll spend large amounts of time swinging at bats while earning enough funds to delve into the deeper regions, and it can take many hours before you see an enemy you haven't already spent plenty of time bashing on." The IGN review, while commenting favorably on the level of dungeon customization which the game allows, lamented the randomness of attracting certain creatures and the lack of concrete feedback about what each dungeon component is actually doing. The reviewer noted, "...it can often be impossible to evaluate whether or not the floor plans that you've created are actually working in your favor..."

== Sequel ==
As a sequel for Dungeon Maker: Hunting Ground, Dungeon Maker II: The Hidden War (which was also for the PlayStation Portable) was released in Japan, on December 6, 2007. A year later, it was released in North America, on December 9, 2008.
