= Adventure Island =

Adventure Island may refer to:

== Media ==
- Adventure Island (film), a 1947 Paramount film starring Rory Calhoun and Rhonda Fleming
- Adventure Island (TV series), an Australian children's television series
- Adventure Island (video game), a 1986 side-scrolling platform game produced by Hudson Soft, beginning the series of the same name
  - Adventure Island II, a 1991 sequel to Adventure Island originally released for the Nintendo Entertainment System and later ported to the Game Boy under the title Adventure Island
- Dragon's Curse, a 1989 TurboGrafx-16/PC Engine video game released in Japan as Adventure Island

== Places ==
- Adventure Island (amusement park), a theme park in Southend-on-Sea, UK
- Adventure Island (water park), a theme park in Tampa, Florida, US

== See also ==
- New Adventure Island
- Super Adventure Island
- Adventure Island: The Beginning
