= Detective Conan: Crossroad in the Ancient Capital =

- Theatrical release poster
- Kanji: 名探偵コナン 迷宮の十字路(クロスロード)
- Revised Hepburn: Meitantei Konan: Meikyū no Kurosurōdo
- Directed by: Kenji Kodama
- Written by: Kazunari Kochi
- Based on: Case Closed by Gosho Aoyama
- Produced by: Masahito Yoshioka; Michihiko Suwa
- Starring: Minami Takayama; Kappei Yamaguchi; Akira Kamiya; Wakana Yamazaki; Ryo Horikawa; Yuko Miyamura; Megumi Hayashibara; Naoko Matsui; Yukiko Iwai; Ikue Ohtani; Wataru Takagi; Atsuko Yuya; Kazuhiko Inoue; Kenechi Ogata; Chafurin
- Cinematography: Takashi Nomura
- Music by: Katsuo Ohno
- Production company: TMS Entertainment
- Distributed by: Toho
- Release date: 19 April 2003
- Running time: 108 minutes
- Country: Japan
- Language: Japanese
- Box office: ¥3.2 billion ($32.4 million)

Detective Conan: Crossroad in the Ancient Capital (名探偵コナン 迷宮の十字路(クロスロード), Meitantei Konan Meikyū no Kurosurōdo) is a 2003 Japanese animated mystery thriller film and the seventh feature film based on the manga series Case Closed. It was directed by Kenji Kodama.

This film marks the final directorial work by original director Kenji Kodama, who had been in charge since the first film, Case Closed: The Time Bombed Skyscraper. Kodama stepped down from his role as director of the "Detective Conan" series after this film, and was succeeded by Yasuichiro Yamamoto.

It was the first film in full-length traditional digital paint. Studio A-CAT did the 3D graphics. The film was released on 19 April 2003 and grossed ¥3.2 billion.

== Plot ==
A series of murders occurs across Tokyo, Osaka, and Kyoto, in which five men are killed using traditional Japanese weapons such as sword and bow and arrow. The perpetrator is described as wearing a Noh mask depicting an elderly man. Investigations conducted jointly by the Tokyo Metropolitan Police Department, Osaka Prefectural Police, and Kyoto Prefectural Police reveal that the victims were all members of Genji Hotaru, a criminal group specializing in the theft of antique art. The remaining known members of the group are its leader, known as Yoshitsune, his subordinate Benkei, and Ise Saburo, though their true identities remain unknown.

Around the same time, Kogoro Mouri travels to Kyoto with Conan Edogawa and the others at the request of Ryuen, a monk from Sannoji Temple. Eight years earlier, a secret Buddhist statue—the Medicine Buddha, which is revealed only once every twelve years—was stolen from the temple. Recently, the temple received a mysterious drawing believed to indicate the statue's location, and Kogoro is asked to decipher it. At Sannoji Temple, the group meets several individuals connected to the case, including the monk Enkai, antique art dealer and temple patron Sakura Shozo, Noh actor Mizuo Harutaro, and used bookstore owner Taiga Saijo.

While searching for clues related to the drawing, Conan visits Gojo Bridge, a location historically associated with Minamoto no Yoshitsune and Musashibo Benkei, where he encounters Heiji Hattori. Heiji is independently investigating the Genji Hotaru murders, and the two decide to cooperate. During the investigation, Heiji recounts his first love: a girl he met in Kyoto eight years earlier, who was wearing a kimono and singing a temari uta (traditional Japanese ballad) at a temple. He also mentions a crystal ball he picked up at that time, which he continues to carry as a keepsake.

Conan and Heiji later travel to Mount Kurama, where they are attacked by an unknown assailant wielding a bow and arrow and wearing a motorcycle suit. That night, Sakura Shozo is murdered at a teahouse in Ponto-chō. Shortly afterward, Heiji is attacked again while escorting Kazuha Toyama home. The assailant challenges him to a duel using wooden swords, and Heiji is severely injured and hospitalized. Conan eventually deciphers the code in the drawing and determines that the Medicine Buddha statue is hidden at Bukkoji Temple. When Heiji arrives there, he receives a phone call from the culprit, who reveals that Kazuha has been kidnapped and orders Heiji to come to Gyokuryu Temple on Mount Kurama.

At Gyokuryu Temple, "Heiji" confronts the criminal and identifies him as Saijo, who is revealed to be Benkei. Saijo orders his disciples to attack, but "Heiji" intervenes, later revealed to be Conan, who temporarily regresses back into Shinichi Kudo by the cold will and alcohol with the help of Ai Haibara, in disguise. The real Heiji soon joins the confrontation, allowing Kazuha to escape with him into a room within the temple. Shinichi briefly reunites with Ran before tranquilizing her as the alcohol's effects wears off and regressing back into Conan in the process.

Meanwhile, Heiji discovers that the legendary sword Muramasa is hidden inside a chest of drawers and uses the temari uta sung by Kazuha to locate it, challenging Saijo to a final duel. Conan assists Heiji during the final confrontation, disarming Saijo, who wields two swords – one of which is coated with deadly poison – and ultimately defeats him, bringing the case to a close.

The following day, Kazuha sings the temari uta, prompting Heiji to notice an error in the lyrics. This realization leads him to discover that Kazuha herself is the girl he encountered eight years earlier, confirming his first love. Separately, Ran notices lingering sweat stains on her handkerchief from her brief meeting with Shinichi, convincing her that the reunion was real and not a dream.

== Cast ==
- Minami Takayama as Conan Edogawa
  - Kappei Yamaguchi as Shinichi Kudo
- Wakana Yamazaki as Ran Mouri
- Akira Kamiya as Kogoro Mouri
- Chafurin as Juzo Megure
- Atsuko Yuya as Miwako Sato
- Wataru Takagi as Genta Kojima and Wataru Takagi
- Kazuhiko Inoue as Ninzaburo Shiratori
- Ikue Ohtani as Mitsuhiko Tsuburaya
- Megumi Hayashibara as Ai Haibara
- Naoko Matsui as Sonoko Suzuki
- Yukiko Iwai as Ayumi Yoshida
- Ryo Horikawa as Heiji Hattori
- Yuko Miyamura as Kazuha Toyama

== Staff ==
- Original creator: Gosho Aoyama
- Director: Kenji Kodama
- Assistant director: Akira Nishimori
- Screenplay: Kazunari Kouchi
- Music: Katsuo Ohno
- Character design and chief animation director: Masatomo Sudo
- Art director: Yukihiro Shibutani
- Director of photography: Takashi Nomura
- Sound director: Yasuo Uragami
- Sound effects: Masakazu Yokoyama
- Sound production: Audio Planning U
- Producers: Masahito Yoshioka, Michihiko Suwa
- Animation production: TMS Entertainment

== Music ==
The theme song is "Time After Time ~In the City of Whirling Blossoms~" (Time after time 〜花舞う街で〜, "Time after time ~Hana Mau Machi de~) by Mai Kuraki. It was released on March 5, 2003. Crossroad in the Ancient Capital is the second Case Closed film for which Mai Kuraki wrote the theme song, after Countdown to Heaven.

The official soundtrack was released on April 16, 2003. It costs ¥3059 including tax.

== Overview ==
Although the film includes several fictional locations, such as Sannō-ji Temple and Gyokuryū-ji Temple, it prominently features numerous real-world tourist sites in Kyoto, Japan. Throughout the film, the main character Conan Edogawa and his companions are depicted visiting various well-known landmarks, including Kyoto Tower, Kiyomizu-dera, Ponto-chō, Gojo Bridge, Kamo River, Keage Incline, Nanzen-ji, Kurama-dera, and Umekōji Park.

In addition to these landmarks, several shrines, railway stations, and public parks are recreated with a high level of detail. Kurama Station on the Eizan Electric Railway appears in the film, along with a train resembling the 900 Series Kirara; however, the train's color scheme differs from that of the actual rolling stock.

Although Kifune Shrine is depicted in the film's promotional poster, it does not appear within the film itself.

== Reception ==
In the popularity poll of 19 successive films held in 2016, this film won the first place.

== Home media ==
=== DVD ===
The DVD was released on December 17, 2003. It contains the film and the trailer and costs ¥6090 including tax.

=== Blu-ray ===
The Blu-ray version of the film was released on December 24, 2010. The Blu-ray contains the same content as the DVD plus a mini-booklet explaining the film.

== Manga ==
A manga adaptation based on the film, was released in September 2016 until April 2017.
