= Super Adventure =

Super Adventure may refer to:

- KTM 1290 Super Adventure
- Super Adventure Island
  - Super Adventure Island II
- Super Adventure Rockman
- Super Adventure Team
- Masters of the Universe: The Super Adventure
- Hanna–Barbera's World of Super Adventure
- Pleasant Goat and Big Big Wolf: The Super Adventure
- Super Adventure, a 2013 episode from season 4 of Mickey Mouse Clubhouse
