= Brain Lord =

1994 video game

- North American box art
- Developer: Produce!
- Publisher: Enix
- Artist: Sachiko Kamimura
- Composer: Masanao Akahori
- Platform: Super NES
- Release: JP: January 29, 1994; NA: October 1994
- Genre: Action role-playing
- Mode: Single-player

Brain Lord (ブレインロード, Burein Rōdo) is an action role-playing video game developed by Produce! and published by Enix for the Super NES. It was only released in Japan and North America.

== Gameplay ==
Most of the game takes place in dungeons, with a heavy emphasis on puzzles.

The player takes on the role of a young adventurer who can have up to two jades, creatures that perform tasks such as healing or long range attacks, following the player character at one time. There are five dungeons in the game: The Tower of Light, Ancient Ruins, the Ice Castle, Droog Volcano, and Platinum. The player starts out in the town of Arcs; there is only one other town, Toronto. In Toronto there is a battle arena in which the player can fight for money. The player can also bet on other competitors.

The video game features several kinds of weapons including bows, boomerangs, swords, axes, and flails. Defeated enemies yield gold. Throughout the game the player can acquire better armor and weapons to increase his defensive and offensive capabilities, similar to The Legend of Zelda series.

The jades that accompany the protagonist can level up by picking up blue 'XP' orbs that are dropped randomly by defeated enemies.

== Plot ==
According to legend, the region's people were once a tribe of fearless warriors who formed bonds with dragons, fighting together to hold back evil and imprison the Demon King. By the time of the present story, however, the dragons have disappeared, and their fate is unknown.

Remeer's father, the last of the dragon warriors, was sent on a quest to find the last of the dragons terrorizing the village. His father never returned.

Years later Remeer sets out on his own journey to find out what happened to his father. Remeer is joined by his four friends: Kashian (a bounty hunter), Barness (a spiritual guru), Rein (a warrior), and Ferris (a witch). Each help him as he makes his way through the five dungeons in the land.

Remeer (or its equivalent 'Lemele') is used for prominent characters in two more video games developed by Produce! and published by Enix, The 7th Saga and Mystic Ark.

== Reception ==
Reception

Review scores
Publication	Score
Electronic Gaming Monthly	8/10, 7/10, 7/10, 8/10, 7/10
Famitsu	8/10, 7/10, 8/10, 7/10
Game Informer	8/10
Game Players	78%
GameFan	80/100, 80/100, 82/100
Super Play	81%
Total!	3
Super Gamer	71/100

Brain Lord garnered generally favorable reviews from critics. Reviewers in Weekly Famicom Tsūshin had two reviewers comment that the game was similar to the PC game Brandish and another saying it reminded them of Soul Blazer. Hamamura Tsūshin complimented the game saying it was willingness to break free from the mold of established RPGs. Two reviewers complimented the amount of puzzles making it appealing. Another said the game grew plodding as it went on which ruined the more action-oriented parts of the game. The fourth reviewer said that as it was continuous action sequences followed by difficult puzzles, the game did not give the player much room to breathe.

The reviewers of Electronic Gaming Monthly said Brain Lord was "more standard fare" from Enix. While complimenting that it strikes a nice balance between the action and RPG elements, and the "atmospheric" music, they found the story plodding and only containing average graphics.

In a retrospective review, Game Informer complimented the games logic puzzles, calling them "good ones, not just stupid two-step switch puzzles." They described the graphics to be sub-par, even for the time of its release and that it had the "nasty tendency to make you replay long portions if you die."
