= Adventure Island IV =

1994 video game

- Cover art by Susumu Matsushita
- Developer: Now Production
- Publisher: Hudson Soft
- Series: Adventure Island
- Platform: Family Computer
- Release: JP: June 24, 1994
- Genre: Metroidvania
- Mode: Single-player

Takahashi Meijin no Bōken Jima IV (Note: Japanese: 高橋名人の冒険島IV; lit. Master Takahashi's Adventure Island IV) sometimes referred to as Adventure Island IV, is a 1994 video game released by Hudson Soft for the Family Computer. (Note: The Family Computer (Famicom) and the Nintendo Entertainment System have identical CPUs internally, but have visual and technical differences in their design, controller and game cartridges.)

The game follows Takahashi Meijin (Note: In the Japanese game series, the playable character is Hudson Soft employee Takahashi Meijin who became famous to young Japanese gamers after showcasing his ability at the game in Star Force in 1985. In the English Adventure Island series, the character is known as Master Higgins.) in his quest to rescue his dinosaur companions, who have been kidnapped by a mysterious entity. Adventure Island IV add new gameplay elements to the series. Instead of a series of explicitly separate stages, it features a complex scrolling map connecting its various levels. The player progresses through these levels by solving puzzles, using various items, and defeating the boss enemies.

The sales department at Hudson Soft suggested that the company create a new game for the Famicom. They believed it could potentially perform well, as games for the system were still sold in the Japanese market. This led to the development of a new Adventure Island game, as the company felt it would require the shortest amount of development time. Now Production, who developed Adventure Island II (1991) and Adventure Island 3 (1992), created the game. Upon its release in Japan on June 24, 1994, the game became the final licensed title for the Famicom. Takahashi Meijin said that of the 36 titles that Hudson Soft released for the Famicom, Adventure Island IV sold the least amount of copies.

== Plot and gameplay ==
A boss battle in Adventure Island IV. Unlike previous entries in the series, the player now has a life gauge that is displayed at the bottom of the screen.

A mysterious entity appears and kidnaps Takahashi Meijin's five dinosaur companions, who are recurring characters in the Adventure Island games. Meijin sets out to rescue them.

Meijin navigates the game world by moving forwards and backwards, as well as jumping. He can interact with elements in the environment, such as by climbing trees and entering doors. He also uses a wide variety of items to interact with the world. Some of these items are used as weapons, such as boomerangs and spears. while others, such as the water gun, are used to solve puzzles and progress through the game. Items can also assist with exploration- for example, a compass that lets you see your location in a 3D map.

Adventure Island IV features various boss enemies. Defeating them allows the player to rescue one of the kidnapped dinosaurs and open paths to traverse to new areas. The game has players explore areas with a complex map connecting areas with no explicitly separated stages. The game features a life gauge, which allows Takahashi Meijin to take more than one hit from an enemy. Meijin collects fruits, hearts, and faeries scattered throughout the game. After collecting a certain amount of fruit, it will restore part of his life gauge. The life gauge can also be expanded by collecting two fragments of a heart container.

== Development ==
Adventure Island IV is part of the Adventure Island series of video games that began with Adventure Island in September 1986. The series was popular enough to produce sequels and spin-offs for the Nintendo Entertainment System, Game Boy, TurboGrafx-16 and Super Nintendo Entertainment System.

Despite the newer consoles being released, games for the Famicom were still commercially available in Japan in 1994. The sales department at Hudson Soft suggested releasing a new game for the system, as they believed it still might be able to perform well. Hudson Soft felt an Adventure Island game would require the shortest amount of development time. It also wouldn't use any intellectual property that Hudson Soft didn't already own, avoiding copyright issues that would make them unable to make a game based on properties like Ninja Hattori-kun or Doraemon.

Hudson Soft had Adventure Island IV developed by Now Production. Now Production had previously developed Famicom games such as Splatterhouse: Wanpaku Graffiti (1989) for Namco and Yo! Noid (1990) for Capcom. They had also previously created Adventure Island II (1991) and Adventure Island 3 (1992) for Hudson Soft.

== Release ==
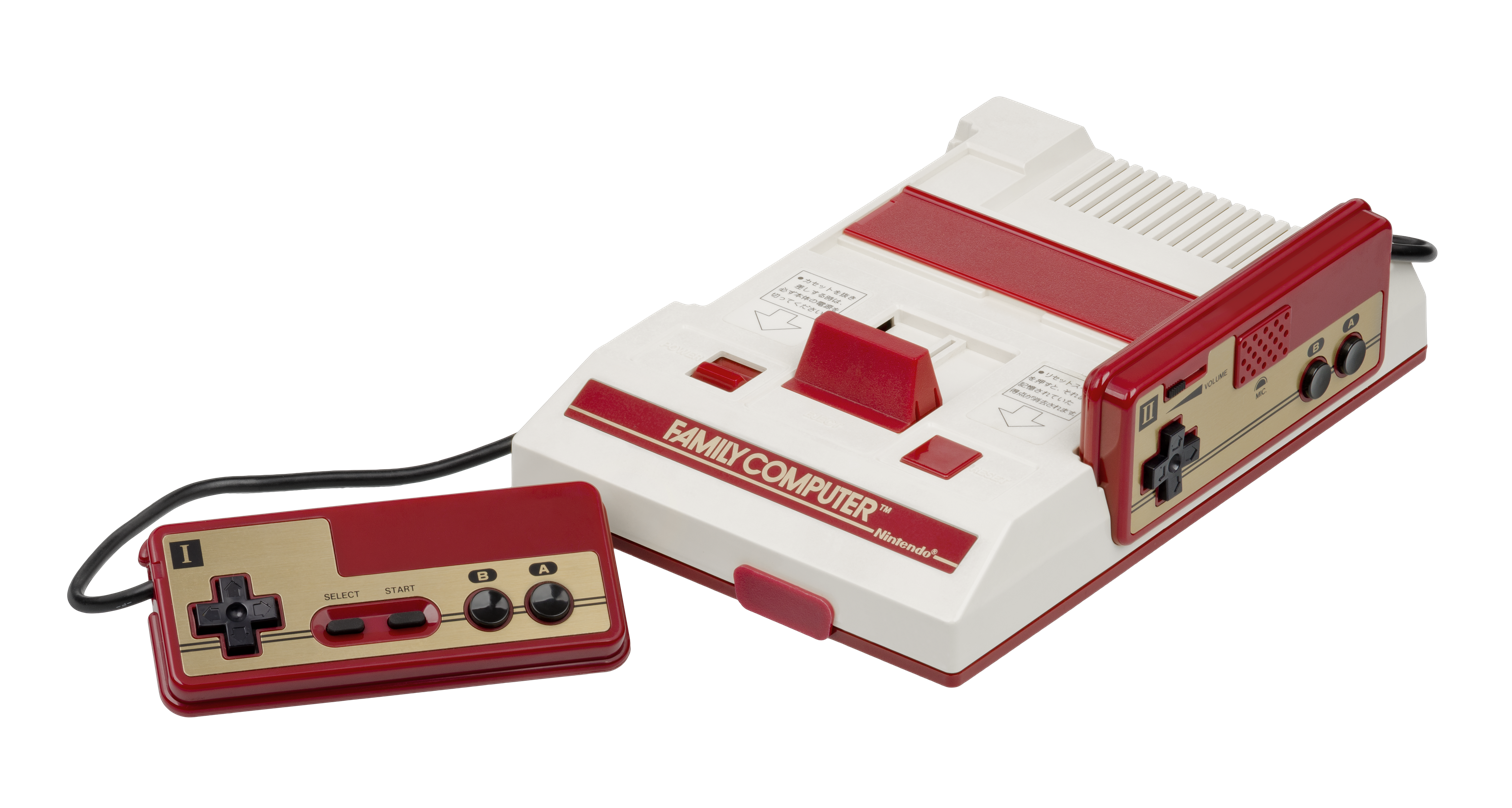
Adventure Island IV was the final commercially released game for the Famicom in Japan.

Adventure Island IV was released on June 24, 1994 for the Famicom. It was the final official release for the Famicom in Japan.

Takahashi Meijin, who worked for Hudson Soft between 1985 and 2011, said that of the 36 titles Hudson Soft published for the Famicom, this game sold the fewest copies. He further explained that when orders for the game began in March 1994, the number of Famicom cartridges on shelves had decreased, and the amount of orders were low. Meijin later said in interviews and blog posts that sales were just "a few tens of thousands", less than 20% of what Adventure Island 3 had sold. He said these low sales led to the game being priced highly later on the second hand market.

Adventure Island IV was re-released on January 19, 2006 for the Game Boy Advance in Japan as volume six in their Hudson Best Collection video game compilation series. This release also included the first three Adventure Island originally released for the Famicom. An English fan-translation of the game was released as Adventure Island IV.

== Reception ==
A reviewer in Electronic Gaming Monthly said that Adventure Island IV had better graphics than any previous Adventure Island game for the Famicom. They also claimed was the best game in the series for the console.

GamesTM covered Adventure Island IV in a retrospective on the history of the Metroidvania genre. They compared the game to Super Metroid (1994), finding many close similarities between the titles. They praise the game for its multi-functional and well integrated items, as well as the ways they allow the player to interact with the world. For example, the game contains a water gun item that is used to defeat enemies, put out fires, and revive plants to use as bouncy platforms. Kevin Anderson of GameSpy said the game was closer than ever on getting the gameplay right with the Adventure Island series, noting innovative boss battles and a pseudo-3D map display. He said the game still has room for improvement; in particular, he criticizes that the game only has one or two uses for some weapons, and that the choice of a dinosaur partner only became important towards the end of the game. He concluded that the game "remained an innovative 2D platformer".

== See also ==
- List of Nintendo Entertainment System games
- List of Hudson Soft games
