= Miho Komatsu 4: A Thousand Feelings =

Miho Komatsu 4 ~ A thousand feeling ~

Studio album by Miho Komatsu
- Released: 7 March 2001
- Recorded: 2000–2001
- Genre: Japanese pop
- Length: 48:38
- Label: Giza Studio
- Producer: Miho Komatsu (Executive Producer: ROCKAKU)

Miho Komatsu chronology
Miho Komatsu 3rd: Everywhere (2000)	Miho Komatsu 4 ~ A thousand feeling ~ (2001)	Miho Komatsu 5: Source (2002)

Singles from Miho Komatsu 4: A thousand feelings
- 1. "Anata ga Iru kara" Released: 21 June 2000; 2. "Kimi no Me ni wa Utsuranai" Released: 18 October 2000; 3. "Love gone" Released: 31 January 2001

Miho Komatsu 4: A thousand feelings (小松未歩 4 〜A thousand feeling〜) is the fourth studio album by Japanese singer and songwriter Miho Komatsu. It was released on 7 March 2001 through Giza Studio label.

== Background ==
The album includes 3 previously released singles, such as Anata ga Iru kara, Kimi no Me ni wa Utsuranai and Love Gone.

Love Gone received special arrangement in this album under title album mix. In compare with a single version, the beginning has lower tune and different instrumentation.

Kanashii Koi has been previously released as b-side track in her single Anata ga Iru Kara.

Some of songs from this album, included Tada Soba ni Itai no, Kanashii Koi, I don't know the truth and Regret were released in her conceptual album Lyrics in 2003.

Love Gone was included in the Giza Studio's compilation album Giza Studio Masterpiece Blend 2001.

== Charting ==
The album reached #9 in its first week with 40,990 copies sold. The album charted for 5 weeks and sold 63,920 copies in total.

This is last album to reach top 10 on the Oricon charts.

== Track listing ==
All tracks are arranged by Yoshinobu Ohga (Nothin' but love) expect of track #2 (by Daisuke Ikeda)

All lyrics are written by Miho Komatsu; all music is composed by Miho Komatsu

No.	Title	Length
1.	"Kimi no Me ni wa Utsuranai" (君の瞳には映らない)	4:28
2.	"Anata ga Iru kara" (あなたがいるから)	4:37
3.	"at him!"	4:25
4.	"Tada Soba ni Itai no" (ただ傍にいたいの)	4:08
5.	"I don't know the truth"	4:56
6.	"Love gone" (<Album Mix>)	4:12
7.	"Tomodachi Ijou" (ともだち以上)	3:42
8.	"regret"	4:55
9.	"Shiawase no Katachi" (幸せのかたち)	4:44
10.	"Kanashii Koi" (哀しい恋)	3:57
11.	"Hold me tight"	4:41
Total length:		48:38

== Usage in media ==
- Hold me tight
  - Used in the PlayStation 2 game Missing Blue as the opening theme
- Anata ga Iru kara
  - Used in the Anime television series film Detective Conan: Captured in Her Eyes as the theme song
- Kimi no Me ni wa Utsuranai
  - for TV Ohsaka program Ame Rock as the ending theme
- I don't know the truth
  - for PlayStation 2 game Missing Blue as the ending theme
- Love Gone
  - for Tokyo Broadcasting System Television program Kokoro TV as the ending theme
  - for Nichion radio music program P.S. Pop Shake as the opening theme
