= Kazuhiko Inoue =

Japanese voice actor and narrator (born 1954)

- 井上 和彦
- Born: March 26, 1954 (age 72); Yokohama, Kanagawa, Japan
- Occupations: Actor; voice actor; narrator; singer
- Years active: 1973–present
- Agent: B-Box
- Notable work: Cyborg 009 as Joe Shimamura/009; Mobile Suit Zeta Gundam as Jerid Messa; Candy Candy as Anthony Brown; Machine Robo: Revenge of Cronos as Rom Stol; Namco x Capcom as Reiji Arisu; Detective Conan as Ninzaburo Shiratori; Naruto as Kakashi Hatake; JoJo's Bizarre Adventure as Kars; Blue Comet SPT Layzner as Eiji Asuka; Muteking, The Dashing Warrior as Rin Yuki/Muteking; Demon Slayer: Kimetsu no Yaiba as Yoriichi Tsugikuni; Mob Psycho 100 as Touichirou Suzuki; Zone of the Enders: The 2nd Runner as Dingo Egret; Metaphor: ReFantazio as Neuras; Natsume's Book of Friends as Nyanko sensei/Madara
- Height: 174 cm (5 ft 9 in)
- Spouses: Yumiko Igarashi Minako Arakawa; Shizuka Ochi (m. 2001; div. 2012)
- Children: 2

Kazuhiko Inoue (井上 和彦, Inoue Kazuhiko; born March 26, 1954) is a Japanese actor, voice actor, narrator and singer. His notable works include Anthony Brown in Candy Candy, Joe Shimamura in the 1979 iteration of Cyborg 009, Jerid Messa in Mobile Suit Zeta Gundam, Kakashi Hatake in Naruto, Kars in JoJo's Bizarre Adventure, Toichirou Suzuki in Mob Psycho 100, Gildarts Clive in Fairy Tail, Yoriichi Tsugikuni in Demon Slayer, and Neuras in Metaphor: ReFantazio.

== Biography ==
Since his debut in 1973, he became one of Japan's most well established voice actors. His early roles from the 1970s include Anthony in Candy Candy, and later as Joe in the 1979 iteration of Cyborg 009. In the 1980s, Inoue's work ranged from the adult-oriented Oishinbo (The Gourmet) to the popular Legend of Heavenly Sphere Shurato for the younger generation. More recently, he is known internationally for roles such as Kars in JoJo's Bizarre Adventure, Kakashi Hatake in Naruto, Eiri Yuki in Gravitation, Aion in Chrono Crusade, Hatori Sohma in Fruits Basket, and Nyanko-sensei/Madara in Natsume Yūjin Chō. His voice performance is often described as natural and relaxed.

Inoue is also well known for more unusual roles such as the crossdresser Nagisa Sawa in Haru wo Daiteita, and Shiron the Windragon in Legendz, who spends half his time as a screeching hamster.

Inoue does voices for anime, video games, drama CDs, Japanese-dubbed movies, and audio books. He has put out many LP and CD albums and has sung in various anime character albums. His most well-known songs are the ones related to the Harukanaru Toki no Naka de Hachiyō Shō series, which he performs live on stage at the annual NeoRomance voice acting events in Japan. In recent years, Inoue has also tried his hand in backstage work such as sound directing. He has set up his own voice acting agency and school, B-Box, to teach the next generation voice talents. He is also the official dubbing voice for Matthew Fox and Mads Mikkelsen.

Being a second-generation A-bomb survivor, he feels strongly against wars. In his autobiographical piece, "Ai ni Tsuite", (愛について About Love, from his CD album Ai, 2003) Inoue expresses his longings for world peace and his love and respect for the ocean and Mother Earth. He was also a close friend of the late fellow voice actor Daisuke Gori. Recently, Inoue won as "Best Supporting Actor" in the Third Seiyu Awards for his role as Nyanko-sensei in Natsume Yūjin Chō.

== Personal life ==
Inoue has married and divorced three times. His first marriage was with manga artist Yumiko Igarashi. Together, they have a son named Keiichi Igarashi (born 1980 or 1981), known professionally as Nanami Igarashi, who is a former idol trainee at Johnny & Associates and later published a comic essay about his experiences as an otokonoko. His second marriage was with voice actress Minako Arakawa. He had a relationship with actress Shizuka Ochi, from 2001 to 2012.

== Filmography ==
=== Anime ===
Year	Series	Role	Crew role, Notes	Source
1975	Ikkyu-san	Tetsusai	Debut role	
1976	Candy Candy	Anthony Brown		
1977	Chogattai Majutsu Robot Ginguiser	Goro Shirogane		
1978	Captain Future	Ken Scott		
1978	Galaxy Express 999	Geronimo		
1979	Anne of Green Gables	Gilbert		
1979–80	Cyborg 009	Joe Shimamura	Also Chou Ginga Densetsu '80	
1980	Muteking, The Dashing Warrior	Rin Yuuki		
1981	Ohayō! Spank	Ryōichi Shinoda		
1981	Beast King GoLion	Akira Kogane		
1981	Fang of the Sun Dougram	Crinn Cashim		
1981	Urusei Yatsura	Tsubame Ozuno		
1982–83	Magical Princess Minky Momo	Jimru		
1983	Magical Angel Creamy Mami	Shingo Tachibana		
1983–86	Captain Tsubasa	Carlos Santana		
1984	Bagi, the Monster of Mighty Nature	Ryo / Ryosuke Ishigami		
1984	Starzan S	Hoshio Yumeno / Starzan S		
1984–85	Persia, the Magic Fairy	Kenji Sawaki		
1984–85	Bismark	Bill Wilcox		
1985	Blue Comet SPT Layzner	Eiji		
1985	Mobile Suit Zeta Gundam	Jerid Messa		
1985–87	Touch	Akito Nitta	Also OVAs	
1985	Cosmo Police Justy	Justy Kaizard	OVA	
1985	Mujigen Hunter Fandora	Sorto	OVA	
1985	Ninja Senshi Tobikage	Joe Maya		
1985	Shōwa Ahōzoshi Akanuke Ichiban!	Koujirou		
1986	Megazone 23 Part II	Garam	OVA	
1986	Machine Robo: Revenge of Cronos	Rom Stoll		
1986	Windaria	Jiru		
1986	Saint Seiya: Knights of the Zodiac	Ōko		
1986	Urban Square	Ryo Matsumoto	OVA	
1986	Grey	Grey		
1987	Bats & Terry	Batsu		
1987–88	Hiatari Ryōkō!	Katsuhiko Muraki		
1987	City Hunter	Shinichi Yotsui	Episode 22	
1987	Zillion	Champ		
1987	Yōtōden	Hayate no Sakon	OVA	
1987	The Phoenix: Chapter of Yamato	Oguna	OVA	
1987	Dangaioh	Burst	OVA	
1987	Battle Royal High School	Yuuki Toshihiro	OVA	
1987	Daimajū Gekitō: Hagane no Oni	Haruka Alford	OVA	
1987	Junk Boy	Manai Tetsu	OVA	
1988	Salamander (video game)	Eddie Evan	OVA	
1988	Sonic Soldier Borgman	Chuck Sweagar		
1988	Ace wo Nerae! 2	Takayuki Todou	OVA	
1988	Vampire Princess Miyu	Pazusu	OVA	
1988	Anpanman	Katsubushiman		
1988	Oishinbo	Shirou Yamaoka		
1988	Legend of the Galactic Heroes	Dusty Attemborough	OVA	
1989	Five Star Stories	Colus III	OVA	
1989	Rhea Gall Force	Bauer	OVA	
1989	Legend of Heavenly Sphere Shurato	Karura Ou Reiga		
1989–92	Ranma ½	Mikado Sanzenin		
1989	Fuma no Kojirou: Yasha-hen	Kousuke Mibu	OVA	
1989–91	Earthian	Kagetsuya	OVA	
1989–90	Gall Force: Earth Chapter	Bauer	OVA	
1990	Guardian of Darkness	Koichi, Buckingham	OVA	
1990	Idol Angel Yokoso Yoko	Mikki	Ep. 11	
1990	B.B	B.B		
1990	Sword for Truth	Sakaki Shuranosuke		
1991	Akai Hayate	Hayate	OVA	
1991	The Heroic Legend of Arslan	Daryuun	OVA	
1991	Handsome na Kanojo	Okita	OVA	
1991–92	Tomoe ga Yuku	Tojo		
1991	Mosaica	Jaker		
1991	Here is Greenwood	Kazuhiro Hasukawa	OVA	
1991	Otohime Connection	Michio Hirano	OVA	
1991	Luna Varga	Gilbert	OVA	
1992	Adventures of Puss-in-Boots	Torusen	Enoki Films	
1992	Genji	Yoshitsune		
1994	Haou Taikei Ryuu Knight	Larser		
1994–98	Blue Seed	Mamoru Kusanagi	Also Blue Seed 2 and Beyond	
1994	Kujaku-Oh 2	Kou		
1995	Elementalors	Shiki		
1995	Saint Tail	Gen'ichirou Haneoka		
1995	Super Atragon	Stoner		
1997	Battle Athletes Victory	Eric Roberts		
1997	Case Closed	Takashi Date	Ep. 55	
1997–98	Fushigi Yuugi	Rokou	OVA 2	
1998	Sexy Commando Gaiden: Sugoi yo!! Masaru-san	Various characters		
1998	Basara	Shuri		
1998	Princess Nine	Hidehiko Hayakawa		
1998	Touch: Miss Lonely Yesterday	Akio Nitta		
1999	Space Pirate Mito	Mitsukuni Kagerou	Also The Two Queens	
1999	The Legend of Black Heaven	Oden stand owner, Male FBI Agent		
1999	Seraphim Call	Urara's Father	Episode 11	
1999	Excel Saga	Gojo Shiouji		
1999	Pocket Monsters: Episode Gold & Silver	Utsuki Hakase		
1999	Omishi Magical Theater: Risky Safety	Bezetto Saashesu		
1999	Samurai: Hunt for the Sword	Torai Nanban	OVA	
2000	Mon Colle Knights	Count Collection (Prince Eccentro)		
2000–01	Banner of the Stars	Nereis; Nefee	Also II and OVA	
2000	Detective Conan	Ninzaburo Shiratori	Second voice	
2000	Descendants of Darkness	Mibu Oriya		
2000–01	Gravitation	Eiri Yuki		
2000	Hiwou War Chronicles	Ryouma Sakamoto		
2000	Kikaider		Dubbing director	
2000	Kikaider 01		Dubbing director	
2001	Samurai Girl: Real Bout High School		Sound director	
2001	Touch: Cross Road – Kaze no Yukue	Bob		
2001	Chance Pop Session	Yoh Sakuramiya		
2001	Fruits Basket	Hatori Sohma, Kyo's Father		
2001	Inuyasha	Ryūkotsusei		
2002–03	Haruka: Beyond the Stream of Time ~Ajisai Yumegatari~	Tomomasa Tachibana	OVA	
2002	Samurai Deeper Kyo	Muramasa		
2002	Shrine of the Morning Mist	Amatsu Narita		
2002	Spiral	Kiyotaka Narumi	Sound director	
2002–07	Naruto	Kakashi Hatake		
2003–04	Origami Warriors	Enji Hoshizora		
2003	Harukanaru Toki no Naka de 2: Shiroki Ryuu no Miko	Hisui	OVA	
2003	Kino's Journey	Traveler		
2003–04	The Galaxy Railways	Wataru Yuuki		
2003	Chrono Crusade	Aion		
2004–08	Kyo Kara Maoh!	Günter von Christ	Also 2nd and 3rd seasons	
2004	Legendz: Tale of the Dragon Kings	Shiron the Windragon, Ranshiin		
2004–06	Harukanaru Toki no Naka de Hachiyō Shō	Tomomasa Tachibana	Also OVA	
2004–05	Tactics	Suekichinobu Watanabe	Dubbing director	
2005–06	The Law of Ueki		Dubbing director	
2005	Moeyo Ken		Sound director	
2005	Iriya no Sora, UFO no Natsu	Enomoto	OVA	
2006	Ergo Proxy	Kazukisu Hauer		
2006	Yōkai Ningen Bem	Bem		
2006	Intrigue in the Bakumatsu – Irohanihoheto	Sotetsu Ibaragi		
2007–17	Naruto: Shippuden	Kakashi Hatake		
2007	Darker than Black: Kuro no Keiyakusha	November 11		
2007	Moonlight Mile	Goro Saruwatari		
2008	Katekyō Hitman REBORN!Reborn!	Gamma		
2008	Junjou Romantica	You Miyagi		
2008–17	Natsume's Book of Friends	Nyanko-sensei / Madara	6th season in 2017	
2009	The Sacred Blacksmith	Hugo Housman		
2010	Harukanaru Toki no Naka de 3	Kajiwara Kagetoki	OVA	
2011	Fairy Tail	Gildarts Clive		
2011	Guilty Crown	Shuichiro Keido		
2011	Mobile Suit Gundam AGE	Narrator, adult Flit Asuno		
2011	Rio: Rainbow Gate!	Ray		
2012	Eureka Seven AO	Truth/ Archetype Nirvash Neo		
2012–13	JoJo's Bizarre Adventure	Kars		
2013	Red Data Girl	Daisei Suzuhara		
2013	Gintama	Oboro		
2013	Mushibugyou	Oooka Echizen no Kamitadasuke		
2014–15	Noragami	Kuraha	Also OVAs and Aragoto	
2014	HappinessCharge PreCure!	Red/Deep Mirror		
2014	Tokyo ESP	Roushi Youdani		
2014	Z/X Ignition	Sieger		
2014	Parasyte	Gotou		
2014	Majin Bone	Klude/Dark Wyvern		
2015	Mr. Osomatsu	Matsuzō Matsuno		
2016	Phantasy Star Online 2: The Animation	Kid		
2016	KonoSuba	Ignis Dustiness Ford		
2016	Twin Star Exorcists	Kuranashi		
2016	Heybot!	Neji King, Boxer Oyaji, Ketsumacca, Subsurvival, Merameratto, Fuchafuchacchi, Oraorider, Gekijaku Dragon, Teruterun, Soldier Bot, Tarubelt		
2016	Mob Psycho 100	Toichiro Suzuki	Ep. 12	
2017	ACCA: 13-Territory Inspection Dept.	Lilium's Older Brother	Ep. 4	
2017	Ninja Girl & Samurai Master	Matsunaga Hisahide		
2017	Boruto: Naruto Next Generations	Kakashi Hatake		
2018	Kakuriyo no Yadomeshi	Shirō Tsubaki		
2018	Tokyo Ghoul:re	Donato Porpora		
2018	Goblin Slayer	Goblin Lord		
2019	7 Seeds	Kaname Mozunoto		
2020	Smile Down the Runway	Kenji Fujito		
2020	Keep Your Hands Off Eizouken!	Mr. Fujimoto		
2020	Drifting Dragons	Yoshi		
2020	Oda Cinnamon Nobunaga	Kuroda Charlie Yoshitaka		
2020	ARP Backstage Pass	Chairman		
2020	Attack on Titan	Willy Tybur		
2021	Heaven's Design Team	Tsuchiya		
2021	Tsukimichi: Moonlit Fantasy	Patrick Rembrandt		
2021	Resident Evil: Infinite Darkness	Graham		
2022	Demon Slayer: Kimetsu no Yaiba – Entertainment District Arc	Yoriichi Tsugikuni		
2022	Ascendance of a Bookworm 3rd Season	Sylvester		
2022	RWBY: Ice Queendom	Professor Ozpin		
2022	Cyberpunk: Edgerunners	Faraday		
2023	Chillin' in My 30s After Getting Fired from the Demon King's Army	Aransil		
2023	I Got a Cheat Skill in Another World and Became Unrivaled in the Real World, Too	Usagi		
2023	Edens Zero	Xenolith	Season 2	
2024	Doctor Elise	Minchester De Romanoff		
2024	Mission: Yozakura Family	Ban Yozakura		
2024	Haigakura	Hakugō		
2024	One Piece	Monkey D. Dragon	Replacing Hidekatsu Shibata	
2025	Sorairo Utility	Masao "Masa" Tadokoro		
2025	From Bureaucrat to Villainess: Dad's Been Reincarnated!	Kenzaburō Tondabayashi		
2025	Übel Blatt	Marquis Glenn		
2025	I Left My A-Rank Party to Help My Former Students Reach the Dungeon Depths!	Ruge		
2025	Lazarus	Naga	Ep. 6	
2025	Ranma ½	Happōsai		
2026	Noble Reincarnation: Born Blessed, So I'll Obtain Ultimate Power	Emperor		
2026	A Misanthrope Teaches a Class for Demi-Humans	Shirō Karasuma		
2026	Frieren: Beyond Journey's End	Hero of the South	Season 2	
2026	Dandelion	Daigorō Kyōkawa	ONA	
2026	Red River	Yuri's father	Ep. 1	
2026	The Vermilion Mask	Gaston		
2027	The Skull Dragon's Precious Daughter	Nemu		

=== Films ===
Year	Series	Role	Notes	Source
1980	Cyborg 009: Legend of the Super Vortex	Joe Shimamura		
1991	Ranma ½: Big Trouble in Nekonron, China	Bishamonten, Mikado Sanzenin		
1996	X movie	Yuuto Kigai		
1997	Case Closed: The Time-Bombed Skyscraper	Daisuke Kurokawa		
1997	Samurai X: The Motion Picture	Takimi Shigure		
2000	Case Closed: Captured in Her Eyes	Kyosuke Kazato		
2001	Case Closed: Countdown to Heaven	Inspector Shiratori		
2002	Case Closed: The Phantom of Baker Street	Inspector Shiratori		
2003	Detective Conan: Crossroad in the Ancient Capital	Inspector Shiratori		
2004	Detective Conan: Magician of the Silver Sky	Inspector Shiratori		
2005	Detective Conan: Strategy Above the Depths	Inspector Shiratori		
2006	Detective Conan: The Private Eyes' Requiem	Inspector Shiratori		
2007	Detective Conan: Jolly Roger in the Deep Azure	Inspector Shiratori		
2008	Detective Conan: Full Score of Fear	Inspector Shiratori		
2009	Detective Conan: The Raven Chaser	Inspector Shiratori		
2009	Space Battleship Yamato: Resurrection	General Pascal		
2010	Detective Conan: The Lost Ship in the Sky	Inspector Shiratori		
2011	Detective Conan: Quarter of Silence	Inspector Shiratori		
2011	Children Who Chase Lost Voices	Ryūji Morisaki		
2012	Detective Conan: The Eleventh Striker	Inspector Shiratori		
2013	Lupin the 3rd vs. Detective Conan: The Movie	Inspector Shiratori		
2014	Detective Conan: Dimensional Sniper	Inspector Shiratori		
2016	Your Name	Taki's Father		
2018	Detective Conan: Zero the Enforcer	Inspector Shiratori		
2018	Natsume's Book of Friends The Movie: Ephemeral Bond	Madara/"Nyanko-sensei"		
2020	Love Me, Love Me Not			
2021	Natsume's Book of Friends: The Waking Rock and the Strange Visitor	Madara/"Nyanko-sensei"		
2022	Toku Touken Ranbu: Hanamaru ~Setsugetsuka~	Sanchoumou		

=== Video games ===
Year	Series	Role	Notes	Source
1991–97	Super Robot Wars series	Jerid, Hwang Yan Long, others	Includes F, F Kanketsuhen	
1993–97	Langrisser	Lance	PC Engine, Also I and II compilation for PlayStation	
1993	Startling Odyssey	Leon	PC Engine	
1993	Tenshi no Uta II: Datenshi no Sentaku	Kearu	PC Engine	
1994	Startling Odyssey II Maryuu Sensou	Robin Solford	PC Engine	
1994	Cyborg 009	009	Mega Drive	
1995	Blue Seed	Mamoru Kusanagi		
1995	Emerald Dragon	Husrum	PC Engine	
1995	Puyo Puyo	Schezo Wegey	PC Engine version	
1996	Star Ocean	Ashlay Bernbeldt	Super Famicom	
1997	Kidou Senshi Zeta Gundam 1–2	Jerid Messa	Sega Saturn	
1997	BS Fire Emblem: Archanea War Chronicles	Camus	Satellaview	
2000–04	SD Gundam G Generation series			
2003	ANUBIS ~Z.O.E~	Dingo Egret	PlayStation 2	
2003–present	Naruto series	Kakashi Hatake		
2004	Mobile Suit Gundam SEED: Owaranai Asu e	Gai Murakumo	PlayStation 2	
2004–08	Harukanaru Toki no Naka de series	Tomomasa Tachibana, Hisui, Kagetoki Kajiwara, Kazahaya		
2005	Namco × Capcom	Reiji Arisu	PlayStation 2	
2006	Another Century's Episode 2	Albatro Nal Eiji Asuka	PlayStation 2	
2006	Tales of Phantasia	Klarth F. Lester		
2006	Gundam Battle Royale	Jerid Messa	PlayStation Portable	
2007	Shining Force EXA	Gadofall	PlayStation 2	
2007	Tales of Fandom Vol. 2	Klarth F. Lester		
2007	Crisis Core: Final Fantasy VII	Angeal Hewley	PlayStation Portable	
2007	Everybody's Golf Portable 2			
2008	Super Robot Taisen OG Saga: Endless Frontier	Reiji Arisu	Nintendo DS	
2008	Bleach: The 3rd Phantom	Seigen Suzunami		
2012	Project X Zone	Reiji Arisu	Nintendo 3DS	
2013	Granblue Fantasy	Siegfried		
2013	Drakengard 3	Decadus	PlayStation 3	
2013	JoJo's Bizarre Adventure: All Star Battle	Kars	PlayStation 3, Also R	
2014	3594e Three Kingdoms			
2015	Project X Zone 2	Reiji Arisu	Nintendo 3DS	
2015	JoJo's Bizarre Adventure: Eyes of Heaven	Kars	PlayStation 3 / PlayStation 4	
2017	Fire Emblem Heroes	Camus	iPhone / Android	
2017	Fire Emblem Echoes: Shadows of Valentia	Zeke	Nintendo 3DS	
2017	Final Fantasy XV: Episode Gladiolus	Gilgamesh	PlayStation 4 / Xbox One	
2018	Persona Q2: New Cinema Labyrinth	Doe	Nintendo 3DS	
2019	Touken Ranbu	Sanchōmō	PC, iOS, Android	
2019	Jump Force	Kakashi Hatake	Microsoft Windows, PlayStation 4, Xbox One	
2019	SaGa: Scarlet Grace	Khan	Microsoft Windows / PlayStation 4 / Nintendo Switch / iOS / Android; Ambitions expanded release	
2020	Nioh 2	Oda Nobunaga		
2021	Bravely Default 2	Elvis	Nintendo Switch	
2022	Ghostwire: Tokyo	KK		
2022	Crisis Core: Final Fantasy VII Reunion	Angeal Hewley	PlayStation 4 / PlayStation 5 / Microsoft Windows / Nintendo Switch / Xbox One / Xbox Series	
2023	Granblue Fantasy Versus: Rising	Siegfried	PlayStation 4 / PlayStation 5 / Microsoft Windows	
2023	Final Fantasy VII: Ever Crisis	Angeal Hewley	Android / iOS	
2024	Metaphor: ReFantazio	Neuras	PlayStation 4 / PlayStation 5 / Microsoft Windows / Xbox Series	

=== Television drama ===
Year	Series	Role	Notes	Source
2025	Unbound	Bugyō	Episode 14; Taiga drama	

=== Tokusatsu ===
Year	Series	Role	Crew role, Notes	Source
1974	Saru no Gundan	Rom	Ep. 6	
1994	Zeiram 2	Bobu	Movie	
1995	Mechanical Violator Hakaider	Michael	Movie	
2008	Bit Bullet	Kazuhiko Yanagisawa, Narration	Actor	
2016	Doubutsu Sentai Zyuohger	Ginis/Shin Ginis	Eps 1 – 41, 46, 48 (Normal), 41 – 48 (Shin)	
2022	Avataro Sentai Donbrothers	Shinzo Tadokoro	Ep 19	Cited in credits
2022	Kamen Rider Revice	Giff (voice)	Eps 44 –	Cited in credits

=== Motion Comic ===
- Ultraman (manga) (2015) – Alien Sukurada Adad

=== Overseas dubbing ===
==== Live-action ====
Series	Role	Voice dub for	Notes	Source
Look Who's Talking	James Ubriacco	John Travolta		
Look Who's Talking Too	James Ubriacco	John Travolta		
Look Who's Talking Now	James Ubriacco	John Travolta		
Get Shorty	Chili Palmer	John Travolta		
A Civil Action	Jan Schlichtmann	John Travolta		
The General's Daughter	Brenner	John Travolta		
Domestic Disturbance	Frank Morrison	John Travolta		
Be Cool	Chili Palmer	John Travolta		
Hannibal	Hannibal Lecter	Mads Mikkelsen		
The Salvation	Jon	Mads Mikkelsen		
Doctor Strange	Kaecilius	Mads Mikkelsen		
Polar	Duncan Vizla	Mads Mikkelsen		
Another Round	Martin	Mads Mikkelsen		
Fantastic Beasts: The Secrets of Dumbledore	Gellert Grindelwald	Mads Mikkelsen		
Indiana Jones and the Dial of Destiny	Jürgen Voller	Mads Mikkelsen		
The Core	Dr. Joshua "Josh" Keyes	Aaron Eckhart	2005 TV Asahi edition	
The Dark Knight	Harvey Dent / Two-Face	Aaron Eckhart	2012 TV Asahi edition	
Love Happens	Burke	Aaron Eckhart		
Olympus Has Fallen	President Benjamin Asher	Aaron Eckhart		
London Has Fallen	President Benjamin Asher	Aaron Eckhart		
The Bricklayer	Vail	Aaron Eckhart		
Firestorm	Lui Ming-chit	Andy Lau		
The Bodyguard	Li Zheng Jiu	Andy Lau		
The Adventurers	Dan Cheung	Andy Lau		
Chasing the Dragon	Lee Rock	Andy Lau		
The White Storm 2: Drug Lords	Yu Shun-tin	Andy Lau		
Dragnet	Det. Pep Streebek	Tom Hanks		
Big	Joshua "Josh" Baskin	Tom Hanks	1990 TV Tokyo edition	
You've Got Mail	Joe "NY152" Fox	Tom Hanks		
Cast Away	Chuck Noland	Tom Hanks		
Cloud Atlas	Dr. Henry Goose, Hotel Manager Isaac Sachs, etc.	Tom Hanks		
Lost	Jack Shephard	Matthew Fox		
Vantage Point	Agent Kent Taylor	Matthew Fox		
World War Z	U.S. Air Force Pararescueman	Matthew Fox		
Extinction	Patrick	Matthew Fox		
Man of Steel	Jor-El	Russell Crowe		
Noah	Noah	Russell Crowe		
The Nice Guys	Jackson Healy	Russell Crowe		
Zack Snyder's Justice League	Jor-El	Russell Crowe		
The Transporter	Frank Martin	Jason Statham	TV Asahi edition	
Transporter 2	Frank Martin	Jason Statham	TV Asahi edition	
Transporter 3	Frank Martin	Jason Statham	TV Asahi edition	
A Better Tomorrow	Sung Tse-Kit	Leslie Cheung		
Okinawa Rendez-vous	Jimmy Tong	Leslie Cheung		
Double Tap	Rick Pang	Leslie Cheung		
Beverly Hills Cop III	Det. Sgt. William 'Billy' Rosewood	Judge Reinhold	1997 TV Asahi edition	
Beethoven's 3rd	Richard Newton	Judge Reinhold		
Beethoven's 4th	Richard Newton	Judge Reinhold		
Tomb Raider	Lord Richard Croft	Dominic West		
Les Misérables	Jean Valjean	Dominic West		
17 Again	Mike O'Donnell (adult)	Matthew Perry		
300: Rise of an Empire	Scyllias	Callan Mulvey		
The 33	"Super" Mario Sepúlveda	Antonio Banderas		
Admission	John Pressman	Paul Rudd		
Agatha Christie's Marple	Inspector Neil	Matthew Macfadyen	Season 4	
The Age of Adaline	William Jones	Harrison Ford		
A.I. Artificial Intelligence	Henry Swinton	Sam Robards		
Alien Hunter	Julien Rome	James Spader		
American Graffiti	John Milner	Paul Le Mat	2011 Blu-Ray edition	
Battlestar Galactica	Captain Apollo	Richard Hatch		
Better Call Saul	Howard Hamlin	Patrick Fabian		
Bill & Ted's Bogus Journey	Ted "Theodore" Logan	Keanu Reeves		
Blood & Treasure	Karim Farouk	Oded Fehr		
Boss Level	Colonel Clive Ventor	Mel Gibson		
Bridget Jones's Baby	Jack Qwant	Patrick Dempsey		
Bullet Train	The Elder	Hiroyuki Sanada		
Career Opportunities	Jim Dodge	Frank Whaley		
Catch a Fire	Nic Vos	Tim Robbins		
The Crying Game	Jody	Forest Whitaker		
Cursed	Jimmy Myers	Jesse Eisenberg		
The Dark Tower	Walter Padick, the Man in Black	Matthew McConaughey		
The Dog Stars	Pops	Guy Pearce		
Dolittle	Don Carpenterino	David Sheinkopf		
Dumbo	V. A. Vandevere	Michael Keaton		
Elementary	Mycroft Holmes	Rhys Ifans	Season 2	
The First Lady	Franklin D. Roosevelt	Kiefer Sutherland		
Flags of Our Fathers	James Bradley	Thomas McCarthy		
Flicka	Rob McLaughlin	Tim McGraw		
Friends	Parker	Alec Baldwin		
Gemini Man	Clayton "Clay" Varris	Clive Owen		
The Greatest American Hero	Tony Villicana	Michael Paré		
Herbie: Fully Loaded	Ray Peyton Sr.	Michael Keaton		
The High Note	Max	Bill Pullman		
The Hitcher	Jim Halsey	C. Thomas Howell	1987 TV Tokyo edition	
Hollywoodland	Louis Simo	Adrien Brody		
House of Wax	Bo Sinclair	Brian Van Holt		
Invincible	Michael Fu/Water	Byron Mann		
Jurassic World Dominion	Dr. Lewis Dodgson	Campbell Scott		
The Kennedys	John F. Kennedy	Greg Kinnear		
The King's Man	United States Ambassador	Stanley Tucci		
The Matchmaker	Sean	David O'Hara		
Miami Rhapsody	Matt	Gil Bellows		
Mortal Kombat	Hanzo Hasashi / Scorpion	Hiroyuki Sanada		
Mortal Kombat II	Hanzo Hasashi / Scorpion	Hiroyuki Sanada		
Mulan	Commander Tung	Donnie Yen		
The Natural	Roy Hobbs	Robert Redford		
NCIS	Leroy Jethro Gibbs	Mark Harmon		
No Strings Attached	Alvin Franklin	Kevin Kline		
Notting Hill	William "Will" Thacker	Hugh Grant		
Old School	Dean Gordon "Cheese" Pritchard	Jeremy Piven		
The One	Gabriel Yulaw/Gabe Law	Jet Li		
The Order	William Eden	Benno Fürmann		
People Places Things	Will Henry	Jemaine Clement		
Pleasantville	Bill Johnson	Jeff Daniels		
Predators	Royce	Adrien Brody		
Private Practice	Jake Riley	Benjamin Bratt	Season 5	
The Protégé	Michael Rembrandt	Michael Keaton		
Raising Helen	Pastor Dan	John Corbett		
Red Heat	Detective Art Ridzik	James Belushi	2021 Wowow edition Additional recording	
Reservation Road	Dwight Arno	Mark Ruffalo		
Scream 3	Det. Mark Kinclaid	Patrick Dempsey		
Shorts	Mr. Carbon Black	James Spader		
A Simple Life	Roger			
Snake Eyes	Blind Master	Peter Mensah		
Snow White	The Good King	Hadley Fraser		
Snowden	Corbin O'Brian	Rhys Ifans		
The Sound of Music	Captain von Trapp	Christopher Plummer	2011 TV Tokyo edition	
Space Sweepers	James Sullivan	Richard Armitage		
Spin City	Charlie Crawford	Charlie Sheen		
Stand by Me	Ace Merrill	Kiefer Sutherland		
Super Mario Bros.	Iggy	Fisher Stevens		
Super Pumped	Bill Gurley	Kyle Chandler		
Supernatural	Lucifer	Mark Pellegrino	season 11-onwards	
Supernova	Sam	Colin Firth		
Suspiria	Dr. Frank Mandel	Udo Kier	1986 TV Tokyo edition	
S.W.A.T.: Under Siege	Travis Hall	Sam Jaeger		
A Thousand Words	Dr. Sinja	Cliff Curtis		
Three Men and a Baby	Jack Holden	Ted Danson		
Tremors	Valentine	Kevin Bacon		
Two and a Half Men	Charlie Harper	Charlie Sheen		
Unlocked	Eric Lasch	Michael Douglas		
Valley of the Boom	James L. Barksdale	Bradley Whitford		
When Harry Met Sally...	Harry Burns	Billy Crystal		
Wild Wild West	Artemus Gordon, President Grant	Kevin Kline		
X Company	Duncan Sinclair	Hugh Dillon		
Zathura: A Space Adventure	Dad	Tim Robbins		

==== Animation ====
Series	Role	Notes	Source
Adventure Time	Party Pat		
Meet the Robinsons	Cornelius Robinson (Future Lewis)		
Oni: Thunder God's Tale	Tengu		
The Little Mermaid	Prince Eric		
RWBY	Professor Ozpin		
The House of Magic	Lawrence Savile		
The Iron Giant	Dean McCoppin		
What If...?	Uatu the Watcher		

=== Other roles ===
- From Far Away (From Far Away) CD Drama (1999): Keimos Lee Goda

== Discography ==
=== Albums ===
List of albums, with selected chart positions
Release Date	Title	Catalogue Number (Japan)	Oricon	
Release Date	Title	Catalogue Number (Japan)	Peak position	Weeks charted
2008	Mataseta ne ☆ senyorīta (Hitsujideoyasumi shirīzu Vol. 11)	HO-0019	88	2
2011	Yuki (Shukan soine CD Vol. 10)	BR-0026	34	3
2013	Shinsenkumi kekkon-roku wasurenagusa dai san maki kondōisami	REC-062	32	2

=== Singles ===
List of singles, with selected chart positions
Release Date	Title	Catalogue Number (Japan)	Oricon	
Release Date	Title	Catalogue Number (Japan)	Peak position	Weeks charted
1995	"Risky Game"	KIDA-105	–	–
2008	Gunther von Christ (Kyo Kara Maoh! character song series vol 5)	MMCC-4136	63	2

=== Drama audio recordings ===
Series	Role	Notes	Source
Antique Bakery			
Aoi Gakuen Playtime			
Apricot	Kazuaki Ichinose		
Arashi no Destiny			
B Gata Doumei Drama Album	Black		
Den'ei Shoujo Video Girl Ai	Niimai Takashi		
Earthian	Kageaya		
Emerald Dragon	Husrum		
Fire Emblem			
First Kiss Monogatari			
Force-out Demon	Chitoku		
From Beyond	Keimosu		
Gall Force Earth Chapter Back to the school wars	Bauer		
Gekkou no Pierce	Suzukage Seiki		
Harukanaru Toki no Naka de series	Tomomasa Tachibana, others		
The Heroic Legend of Arslan	Daryun		
Kannou series			
Koko wa Green Wood	Hasukawa Kazuhiro		
Lodoss Tou Senki (Volume 4)			
Miscast series	Yuuji Fukazawa		
Mugen Chitai Megazone 23 Image Album "Ushinawareta season"			
Outo Ayakashi Kitan	Abe Seimei		
Panty & Stocking with Garterbelt	Dmitri Fullchinkov		
Red River	Kyle		
Rurouni Kenshin -Meiji Kenkaku Romantan- (Volume 2)			
Saint Beast	Saints		
Shining Force Exa	Gadofall		
Shinjuku Guardian	Keiichiro Uesugi		
Shinsengumi Ibun Aoki Ookamitachi no Shinwa 2: Asagiiro no yoake	Sakamoto Ryuuma		
Shinsengumi Ibun Aoki Ookamitachi no Shinwa Ongaku Special: Makoto	Sakamoto Ryuuma		
Tales of Phantasia	Klarth F. Lester		
Ten ha Akai Kawa no Hotori	Kyle		
