= AI2 =

AI2 may refer to:

- Adventure Island II
- Allen Institute for AI
- App Inventor 2
