= Kimi no Me ni wa Utsuranai =

2000 song performed by Miho Komatsu

Single by Miho Komatsu

from the album Miho Komatsu 4 ~ A thousand feelings ~
- Released: October 18, 2000
- Recorded: 2000
- Genre: J-pop
- Length: 14 minutes
- Label: Giza Studio
- Songwriter(s): Miho Komatsu
- Producer(s): Miho Komatsu (Executive Producer : ROCKAKU)

Miho Komatsu singles chronology
"Anata ga Iru Kara" (2000)	"Kimi no Me ni wa Utsuranai" (2000)	"Love gone" (2001)

"Kimi no Me ni wa Utsuranai" (君の瞳には映らない, lit. "I do not see it in your eyes) is the 11th single of the Japanese singer Miho Komatsu released under Giza studio label. The single reached #19 rank first week and sold 15,020 copies. It charted for 2 weeks and sold 19,640 copies.

== Track listing ==
All songs are written and composed by Miho Komatsu and arranged by Yoshinobu Ohga

1. Kimi no Me ni wa Utsuranai (君の瞳には映らない)
2. Anata Wo Aishiteku Koto (あなたを愛してくこと)
3. Kimi no Me ni wa Utsuranai (君の瞳には映らない) (instrumental)
