= Case Closed: Countdown to Heaven =

- Theatrical release poster
- Kanji: 名探偵コナン 天国へのカウントダウン
- Revised Hepburn: Meitantei Conan: Tengoku e no Kauntodaun
- Directed by: Kenji Kodama
- Written by: Kazunari Kouchi
- Based on: Case Closed by Gosho Aoyama
- Produced by: Michihiko Suwa
- Starring: Minami Takayama; Kappei Yamaguchi; Akira Kamiya; Wakana Yamazaki; Megumi Hayashibara; Naoko Matsui; Yukiko Iwai; Ikue Ohtani; Wataru Takagi; Kenichi Ogata; Toshiko Fujita; Kouichi Hashimoto; Ichirou Nagai; Aya Hisakawa; Chafurin; Isshin Chiba; Kazuhiko Inoue; Sakiko Tamagawa; Fumihiko Tachiki; Yukitoshi Hori
- Music by: Katsuo Ono
- Production company: TMS Entertainment
- Distributed by: Toho
- Release date: April 21, 2001
- Running time: 95 minutes
- Country: Japan
- Language: Japanese
- Box office: ¥ 2.9 billion (US$ 29.3 million)

Case Closed: Countdown to Heaven, known as Detective Conan: Countdown to Heaven (名探偵コナン 天国へのカウントダウン, Meitantei Conan: Tengoku e no Kauntodaun), is a 2001 Japanese animated mystery disaster film and the fifth feature film based on the Case Closed series. It made 2.9 billion yen.

Case Closed: Countdown to Heaven involves active members of the Black Organization, making this the Black Organization's first appearance in a film series.

== Plot ==
The Junior Detective League, Conan Edogawa, Vi Graythorn, and Dr. Agasa are on a camping trip. Along the way, they notice Mount Fuji and the newly constructed Twin Towers, the tallest buildings in Japan and dubbed "the closest thing to heaven". During the night, George Kaminski notices Vi talking to the Black Organization while he goes to the restroom. Meanwhile, the Black Organization members Gin and Vodka, on a hunt for Shiho Miyano, sneak into the flat of Shiho's late sister Akemi and listen to the messages on the answering machine. They discover that Shiho will attend a private viewing of the aforementioned skyscrapers in West Tama City. Gin and Vodka plan to murder Shiho there.

The group visits the Twin Towers on their way back home, Richard, Rachel Moore and Serena Sebastian, in addition to Richard's old friend from college, Madison Monroe, her secretary Cherilyn Chrisabel, Japanese artist Kisaragi Hosui, executive Zachary Hara, Twin Towers councilman Augustine Odell, Twin Towers architect Theodore Radcliff, the latter who once studied architecture under former professor-turned-serial bomber Leo Joel. (Note: As depicted in Case Closed: The Time Bombed Skyscraper. (1997)) The drunken Augustine invites Madison over for the night in the hotel tower, despite them not officially opened to the public. Madison prepared a room for him anyway. Two employees come up to the VIP elevator and talk about how a nice car pulled up. The other employee says it's a Porsche 356A, catching Conan's attention, who asks for the car's detail which matches that of Gin's. He quickly runs into the elevator looking down briefly, and sees the Porsche drive off as he approaches the entrance. Later that night, Augustine is brutally murdered in his own suite.

During the investigation, a broken sake cup is found and the painting Augustine had is missing. Police are drawn to two conclusions on the sake cup: it either simply fell from Odell during the murder, or it was left deliberately as a message. The Junior Detective League conducts their own investigation and interrogates Theodore, who got the job because of Odell, and Kisaragi, who was in the middle of painting Mt. Fuji despite his shades blocking his view. After their questioning, the group disbands. Vi is later seen talking with someone on the phone at Agasa's house, not realizing Gin and Vodka are listening on the other end.

The following day, the kids resume their investigation by interrogating Hara. They arrive at his home, find the door slightly opened, and discover Hara shot to death with a knife in his hand; another broken sake cup is found near his corpse, and police conclude that a serial killer is at large. Hara's computer was erased of its data. Due to the escalating murders, Joseph Meguire pleads with Madison to postpone the Twin Towers grand opening party, but she refuses and invites them instead. Elsewhere, Vodka is searching through Akemi's empty apartment. Gin arrives attempting to track Vi/Shiho's location through a phone line, but is cut off when Conan disconnects it from Agasa's house. Vi, still grieving over Akemi's death, runs away crying. She explains the next day that hearing her sister's voice helps calm her down. At the Twin Towers, guards have been knocked out with sleeping gas, and bombs have been put in various locations of the complex. Conan wonders if Hara was connected to the Black Organization.

At the grand opening party, Madison hosts a 30-second guessing game in which Richard wins by pure luck. She then shows off Kisaragi's art in a presentation on stage with Kisaragi, Theodore, and Cherilyn handling the production backstage. As the curtain rises, the audience is horrified to see Madison hanging above the stage with Kisaragi's painting in the background. An unbroken sake cup found below her corpse; a message left by the serial killer. A rattling noise is heard as the remaining suspects walk away. While searching for a motive, Conan solves the case thanks to a hint provided by Vi. Before the murderer's identity is revealed, the bombs planted by the Black Organization detonate, setting the building ablaze. Serena, Conan and Rachel evacuate in a glass elevator when it stops. Conan realizes that with her new perm, Serena looks like Shiho from behind. Conan distracts Serena, making her turn around, saving her from being shot by Gin, who thought she was Shiho, but damaging the elevator button. The others manage to escape just before the upper bridge blown off and destroying the lower bridge while Rachel uses the fire hose to jump down and shatters lower floor's window when holding Conan as the fire hose burning from upper floor.

After arriving safely to the ground, Conan re-enters the tower after learning that the Junior Detective League has not evacuated due to the destroyed upper bridge. He and Vi leave them and confronts the serial killer, Kisaragi. As evidence, Kisaragi has Madison's original pearl necklace in his cane, hence the rattling noise as he walks. He murdered Madison by taking off her pearl necklace, then placed an identical one with fishing line, attached to the top of his painting, around her neck. Kisaragi left broken sake cups behind as a symbol of Mount Fuji that had been obscured by the Twin Towers; the unbroken one at Madison's scene didn't need to be smashed, Madison's corpse already split the image of the mountain. Kisaragi confesses, blaming the tower employees for the construction of the Twin Towers, an edifice that obstructed his view of Mount Fuji. Kisaragi attempts to commit suicide, but Conan tranquilizes him.

Conan elaborates how Hara was murdered by Gin; the silver knife in his hand wasn't for defense, it was to identify his killer, silver in Japanese means gin. Kisaragi left his sake cup to make it look like the work of a serial killer. With the helicopter pad and the bottom floors in flames, Conan powers a Ford Mustang convertible with the force of an explosion to propel the Junior Detective League and him to the hotel tower's swimming pool for safety as the bombs planted inside the ballroom explode. Viewing the inferno from afar, Gin and Vodka confirm that Shiho was not at the towers and abandon their search for her, while Kisaragi gets arrested for his crimes.

In the post-credits scene, it is revealed that Mustang is actually the one Richard won during a guessing game, much to his dismay while Conan and the Junior Detective League laugh at Richard's misfortune.

== Cast ==
Character	Japanese	English
Conan Edogawa	Minami Takayama	Alison Retzloff
Shinichi Kudo/Jimmy Kudo	Kappei Yamaguchi	Jerry Jewell
Ai Haibara/Shiho Miyano/Vi Graythorn	Megumi Hayashibara	Brina Palencia
Mitsuhiko Tsuburaya/Mitch Tennyson	Ikue Ohtani	Cynthia Cranz
Kogoro Mouri/Richard Moore	Akira Kamiya	R. Bruce Elliott
Ran Mouri/Rachel Moore	Wakana Yamazaki	Colleen Clinkenbeard
Genta Kojima/George Kaminski	Wataru Takagi	Mike McFarland
Wataru Takagi/Harry Wilder	Wataru Takagi	Doug Burks
Ayumi Yoshida/Amy Yeager	Yukiko Iwai	Monica Rial
Sonoko Suzuki/Serena Sebastian	Naoko Matsui	Laura Bailey
Juzo Megure/Joseph Meguire	Chafurin	Mark Stoddard
Dr. Hiroshi Agasa	Kenichi Ogata	Bill Flynn
Akemi Miyano	Sakiko Tamagawa	Alex Valle
Iwamatsu Ohki/Augustine Odell	Takeshi Watabe	Brandon Potter
Hajime Tsukamoto	Jun-ichi Sugawara	Charles Campbell
Kazunobu Chiba	Isshin Chiba	Chris Cason
Ninzaburo Shiratori/Nicholas Santos	Kazuhiko Inoue	Eric Vale
Vodka	Fumihiko Tachiki	Christopher R. Sabat
Gin	Yukitoshi Hori	Troy Baker
Emcee		Chuck Huber
Tome	Toshihiko Nakajima	Cole Brown
Mio Tokiwa/Madison Monroe	Toshiko Fujita	Elizabeth Bontley
Yoshiaki Hara/Zachary Hara	Kouichi Hashimoto	Jakie Cabe
Hohsui Kisaragi	Ichirou Nagai	James Stephens
Chinami Sawauchi/Cherilyn Christabel	Aya Hisakawa	Lydia Mackay
Hidehiko Kazuma/Theodore Radcliff	Jurouta Kosugi	Travis Willingham

== Music ==
The film's ending theme song is "Always" by Mai Kuraki.

== Home media ==
=== VHS ===
The VHS of the film was released on April 10, 2005. It was discontinued soon after 2006 as it was switched to DVD.

=== Region 2 DVD ===
The DVD of the film was released on September 30, 2004. A new DVD was released on February 25, 2011, significantly lowering the original price and added the trailer as a special feature.

=== Region 1 DVD ===
Funimation released the English dub of Countdown to Heaven on DVD on January 19, 2010.

=== Blu-ray ===
The Blu-ray version of the film was released on September 23, 2011. The Blu-ray contains the same content of the DVD plus a mini-booklet explaining the film and the BD-live function.

== Reception ==
Carl Kimlinger of Anime News Network gave a mixed review of the film, saying it suffers from tonal inconsistency when going from "familiar character shtick to sleuthing to Towering Inferno-meets-Die Hard derring-do" and felt the overarching mystery was a disposable side thought, but praised the inclusion of Gin and Vodka in the story and the "action-packed finale" in the skyscrapers.

== See also ==
- The Towering Inferno, a 1974 American film with similar premise.
