= Sachiko Kamimura =

Japanese animator

- 神村 幸子
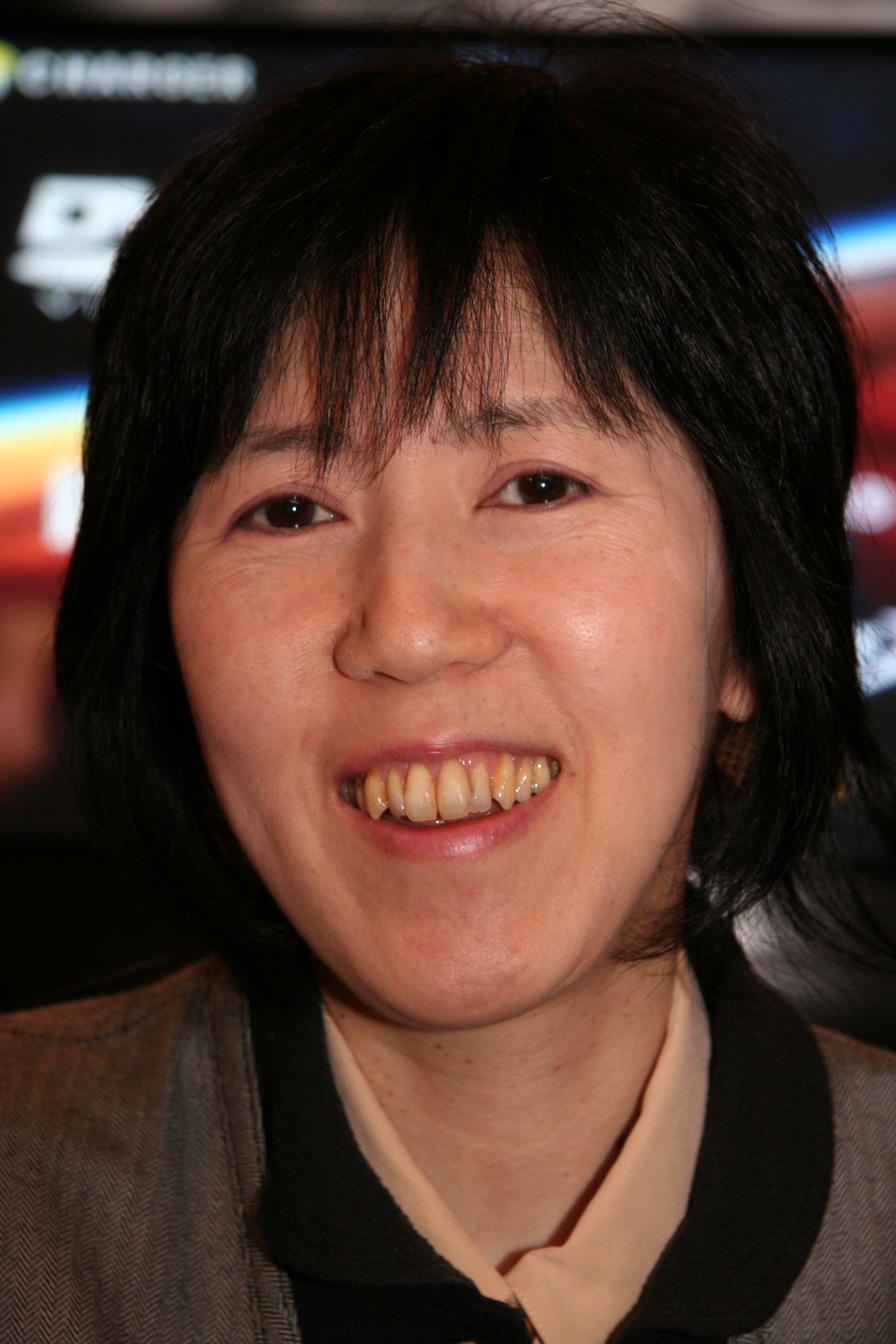
- Sachiko Kamimura at Japan Expo 2007.
- Born: December 30, 1970 (age 55); Niigata Prefecture, Japan
- Occupations: Animator & character designer
- Website: yaneura2015.web.fc2.com

Sachiko Kamimura (神村 幸子, Kamimura Sachiko) is a Japanese animator. She is one of Japan's leading animators, and is noted for her work with Sunrise, where she was the supervising animator and character designer for the City Hunter series and several others, mentoring future several Sunrise character designers and animators, including Toshihiro Kawamoto.

Prior to working at Sunrise, Kamimura previously worked at Toei Animation and Walt Disney Animation Japan. She worked as general supervising animator and character designer when the Tezuka Production Company Ltd. made the Black Jack (manga) into a TV series.

Kamimura designed characters and artwork for the anime film and OVA series The Heroic Legend of Arslan and designed them for the Brain Lord video game, as well as producing illustrations for many Japanese novels.

In 2021, Kamimura was appointed Dean of the Kaishi Professional University's Anime and Manga department.

== Personal life ==
Kamimura is married to Kenji Kodama, anime director.

== Career ==
She studied and taught at Kobe Design University.

== Works ==
=== Books ===
- Encyclopedia of Animation Basics, Graphic Inc ., 1, 2009 ISBN 978-4-7661-2060-8
