= Kenji Kodama =

Japanese anime director

- こだま 兼嗣
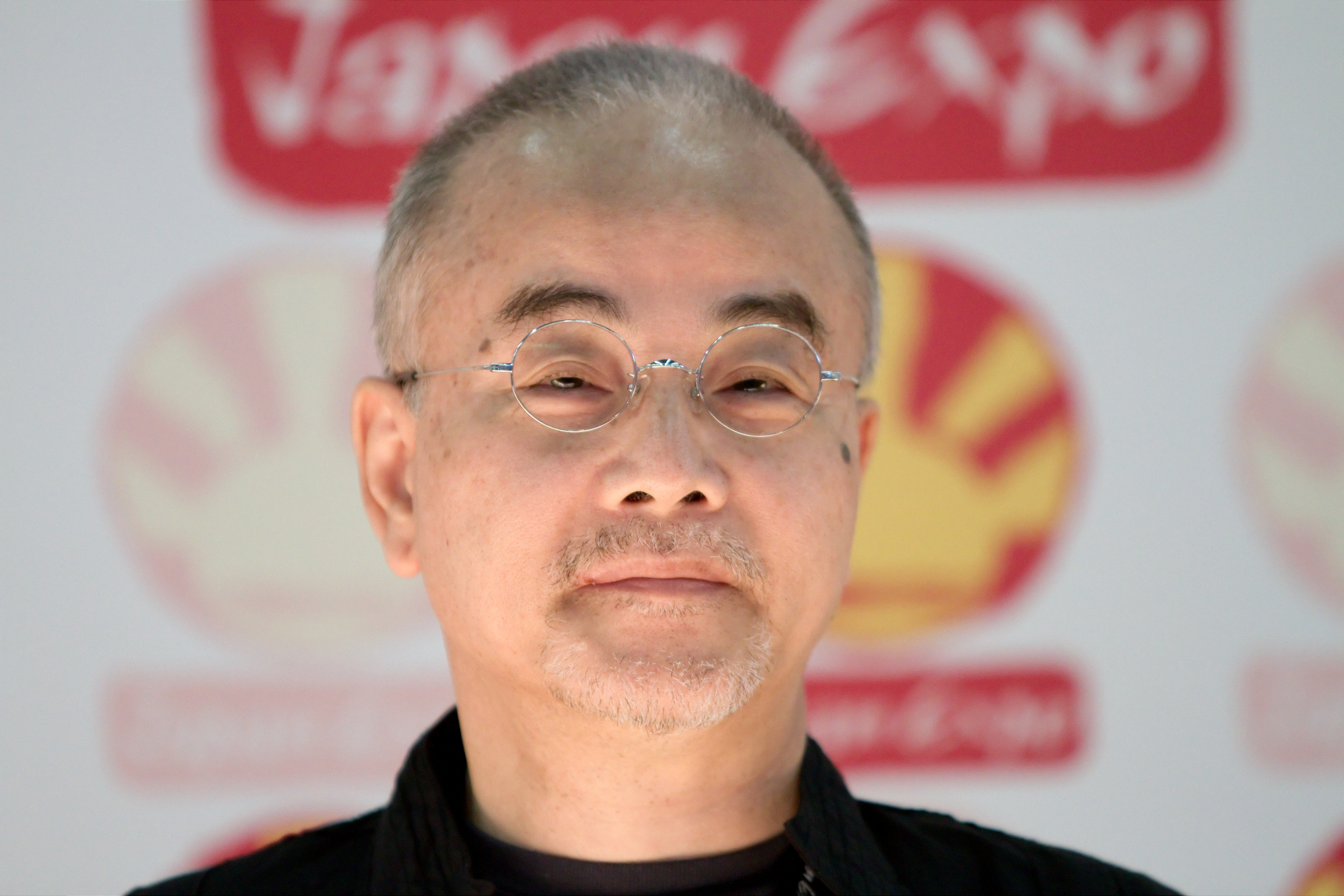
- Kenji Kodama at Japan Expo 2010
- Born: December 13, 1949 (age 76); Hokkaido, Japan
- Other names: Seiji Miyamoto
- Occupation: Anime director
- Known for: Case Closed; City Hunter; Lupin III Part III
- Spouse: Sachiko Kamimura

Kenji Kodama (こだま 兼嗣, Kodama Kenji; December 13, 1949) is a Japanese anime director, and storyboard artist. He is best known for being one of the main directors on the long-running anime Case Closed, as well as the City Hunter series and Lupin III Part III. Kodama is also a member of the Japanese Animation Creators Association.

== Background ==
Kodama is married to Sachiko Kamimura, a prominent animator in the same field.

Kodama has also worked as a storyboard artist in the 1970s and 1980s under the name Seiji Miyamoto.

== Filmography ==
=== Anime ===
List of production work in anime
Year	Title	Crew role	Notes	Source
1984–85	Lupin III Part III	Production, Storyboards		
1984–85	Cat's Eye	Chief director, director, storyboard	2nd TV series	
1986	Robotan	Production	2nd TV series	
1986–87	Bug tte Honey	Director, Continuity		
1987–88	City Hunter	Chief director, director, storyboards		
1988	City Hunter 2	Chief director, director, storyboards		
1989	City Hunter: .357 Magnum	Director	film	
1989–90	City Hunter 3	Director		
1990	The Rose of Versailles	Director	1990 film	
1990	City Hunter: Bay City Wars	Director	OVA	
1990	City Hunter: Million Dollar Conspiracy	Director	OVA	
1991	Reporter Blues	Director		
1991–92	I and Myself: The Two Lottes	Director		
1992–93	My Patrasche	Director		
1996	City Hunter: The Secret Service	Director, Screenplay	TV special	
1996–present	Case Closed	Director, General Director		
1997	Case Closed: The Time Bombed Skyscraper	Director, Screenplay	film	
1998	Case Closed: The Fourteenth Target	Director	film	
1999	Case Closed: The Last Wizard of the Century	Director	film	
2000	Case Closed: Captured in Her Eyes	Director	film	
2001	Case Closed: Countdown to Heaven	Director	film	
2002	Case Closed: The Phantom of Baker Street	Director	film	
2003	Case Closed: Crossroad in the Ancient Capital	Director	film	
2006	Kekkaishi	Director		
2008	Tales of the Abyss	Director	Also OVA fan disc	
	Black Jack	Storyboard		
	Kamichu!	Storyboard		
