= Love gone =

Single by Miho Komatsu

from the album Miho Komatsu 4 ~ A thousand feelings ~
- Released: January 31, 2001
- Recorded: 2000
- Genre: J-pop
- Length: 13 minutes
- Label: Giza Studio
- Songwriter(s): Miho Komatsu
- Producer(s): Miho Komatsu (Executive Producer : ROCKAKU)

Miho Komatsu singles chronology
"Kimi no Me ni wa Utsuranai" (2000)	"Love gone" (2001)	"Todomaru Koto no nai Ai" (2001)

Love gone is the 12th single of the Japanese singer Miho Komatsu released under Giza studio label. It was released 31 January 2001. The single reached #26 rank first week and sold 15,020. It charted for two weeks and sold totally 19,640 copies.

== Track list ==
All songs are written and composed by Miho Komatsu and arranged by Yoshinobu Ohga

1. "Love gone"
  - the song was used as an ending theme for both TBS show Kokoro TV and P.S. ~Pop Shake~.
  - single version and album version have different arrangements
2. "Kore Igai no Ai ga Eien ni Tsuzuku" (これ以外の愛は永遠に続く)
3. "Love gone" (instrumental)
