= Produce (company) =

Japanese video game company

Produce Co., Ltd.
- Industry: Video games
- Founded: April 6, 1990; 36 years ago
- Defunct: February 2015; 11 years ago
- Headquarters: Japan
- Products: The 7th Saga; Brain Lord; Mystic Ark
- Website: www.pro-net.co.jp (defunct - Internet Archive link)

Produce Co., Ltd. was a Japanese video game company. Founded on April 6, 1990 by former Irem employees, it developed a number of games for both Enix and Hudson Soft. Produce! have created games for arcades and for the Super Nintendo Entertainment System, Nintendo 64, PlayStation, and PC Engine systems.

== Games ==
- Tengai Makyou: Dennou Karakuri Kakutouden
- Aldynes: The Mission Code for Rage Crisis
- Super Adventure Island
- The 7th Saga
- Super Bomberman
- Brain Lord
- Super Bomberman 2
- Mystic Ark
- Kaijuu Senki
- Super Bomberman 4
- Neo Bomberman
- Dual Heroes
- Mystic Ark: Theatre of Illusions
- Paca Paca Passion
- Paca Paca Passion 2
- Paca Paca Passion Special
- Kaikan Phrase: Datenshi Kourin
- Googootrops
