= Anata ga Iru kara =

2000 single by Miho Komatsu

Single by Miho Komatsu

from the album Miho Komatsu 4 : A thousand feelings
- Released: June 21, 2000
- Recorded: 2000
- Genre: J-pop
- Length: 19 minutes
- Label: Giza Studio
- Songwriter: Miho Komatsu
- Producer: Miho Komatsu (Executive Producer : ROCKAKU)

Miho Komatsu singles chronology
"Kaze ga Soyogu Basho" (1999)	"Anata ga Iru kara" (2000)	"Kimi no Me ni wa Utsuranai" (2000)

"Anata ga Iru kara" (あなたがいるから; lit. 'Because you are here') is the 10th single by Japanese singer Miho Komatsu, under Giza studio label. It released on 21 June 2000. From this work until Miho Komatsu's 6th album ~ Hanano~ there was no arrangements from Hirohito Furui. Same as on the 7th single Sayonara no Kakera, this one is released in maxi-single format. The single reached #9 in its first week and sold 55,900 copies. This is last single which reached top 10 ranks in Oricon.

== Track list ==
All songs are written and composed by Miho Komatsu

1. Anata ga Iru kara (あなたがいるから)
  - arrangement: Daisuke Ikeda
  - the single was used as an ending song for the animated feature film Case Closed: Captured in Her Eyes. At present this is Miho Komatsu's last Detective Conan song.
2. Kanashii Koi (哀しい恋)
  - arrangement: Yoshinobu Ohga
3. As <everyplace ver.> (instrumental)
  - arrangement: Kūron Oshiro
  - this is re-arrangered version song from 3rd album Miho Komatsu 3rd ~everywhere~
4. Anata ga Iru kara (あなたがいるから) (instrumental)
