= Mystic Ark =

1995 video game

- Developer: Produce!
- Publisher: Enix
- Artist: Akihiro Yamada
- Composer: Akihiko Mori
- Platform: Super Famicom
- Release: JP: July 14, 1995
- Genre: Role-playing
- Mode: Single-player

Mystic Ark (ミスティックアーク, Misutikku Āku) is a 1995 role-playing video game developed by Produce! and published by Enix for the Super Famicom. The video game was only released in Japan. Mystic Ark has strong similarities to the games The 7th Saga and Brain Lord, also developed by Produce and distributed by Enix. The game was being localized for a North American release under the title 7th Saga II, but the release was cancelled.

== Gameplay ==
The game plays mostly as a standard Japanese role-playing game. The player controls the main character from an overhead perspective as the player traverses many worlds with towns and dungeons. The game features random battles that when the player wins will receive experience points that when accumulated will allow the player to reach the next level of experience.

When certain levels of experience have been gained the player will learn spells or techniques. The unique feature of the gameplay is that when the player receives two certain arks, the power ark and the wisdom ark, the player is then allowed to pick two partners of their liking that are located within the temple as figurines.

== Plot ==
The game's plot involves one of two characters that the player can choose, Remeer or Ferris. The chosen hero awakens in a temple, on an unknown island. As the player explores the temple, it is discovered that, in order to make it home, he/she must travel to different worlds that lie within the temple and find the different arks that lie within each world. When the player retrieves all the arks, he/she is given access to the final area of the temple, to face the final boss and finally return home.

Each different world has its own specific storyline, involving Miriene the witch, Reeshine the grappler, Lux the tatsujin, Kamiwoo the ogre, Meisia the priestess and Tokio the ninja. As such, the game plays out more of an anthology of stories with the temple tying the story as a whole together.

== Audio ==
Mystic Ark's music was composed by Akihiko Mori. The game featured 30 tracks of music and was released on 2 discs with the game's original music and with arranged versions of certain tracks.

== Reception ==
Reception

Review scores
Publication	Score
Famitsu	7/10, 8/10, 8/10, 8/10
Jeuxvideo.com	16/20
The Super Famicom	74/100
Super Power	85/100

According to Famitsu, Mystic Ark sold over 48,067 copies in its first week on the market and approximately 75,939 copies during its lifetime in Japan. The Japanese publication Micom BASIC Magazine ranked the game first in popularity in its October 1995 issue, and it received a 22.9/30 score in a readers' poll conducted by Super Famicom Magazine.

== Sequel ==
A sequel titled Mystic Ark: Maboroshi Gekijo (まぼろし劇場; "Theatre of Illusions") was released for the PlayStation in 1999. Despite the original game being a role-playing video game, the sequel was an adventure game instead.
