= New Adventure Island =

1992 platform video game

- Developer: Now Production
- Publishers: JP: Hudson Soft; NA: Turbo Technologies
- Series: Adventure Island
- Platform: TurboGrafx-16
- Release: PC Engine/TG-16: JP: June 26, 1992; NA: 1992
- Genre: Platform game
- Mode: Single-player

New Adventure Island (Note: Japanese: 高橋名人の新冒険島, Hepburn: Takahashi Meijin no Shin Bōken Jima; "Master Takahashi's New Adventure Island") is a side-scrolling platform game by Hudson Soft originally released for the PC Engine/TurboGrafx-16 in 1992. It was later re-released for the Wii Virtual Console service in 2007, the PlayStation Network in 2009, and the Wii U Virtual Console in 2014. It is the fourth game in the Adventure Island series, released shortly after Super Adventure Island for the SNES, but before Adventure Island 3 for the NES.

== Plot ==
While Master Higgins and Tina are leaving the church after getting married, a shadowy figure called Baron Bronsky and six of his underlings kidnap Tina and some of the island children. The player controls Higgins through six stages with four areas each (the fourth area being a boss battle) to rescue the children, and then finally defeat Baron Bronsky in his fortress to rescue Tina.

== Gameplay ==
The rules and controls of the game are almost identical to those from the original Adventure Island, aside for the ability to get bonus points for finishing a stage with a skateboard. This time Higgins has a choice of four weapons to pick up from: the standard axe, a boomerang, arrows and fireballs (the last one can only be found inside hidden eggs). In some hidden eggs, a PC Engine controller item can spawn, which when collected gives the player 2000 points.

== Reception ==
Reception

Review scores
Publication	Score
Electronic Gaming Monthly	7/10, 7/10, 8/10, 7/10
Gekkan PC Engine	80/100, 80/100, 85/100, 75/100, 85/100
Marukatsu PC Engine	6/10, 7/10, 7/10, 5/10
Diehard GameFan	76%, 68%
Famicom Tsūshin	6/10, 6/10, 5/10, 5/10

New Adventure Island received positive reviews from Electronic Gaming Monthly (EGM) "Review Crew", who complimented the graphics and said it would appeal to fans of the previous Adventure Island games.

Some reviewers in Diehard GameFan and EGM complimented the release of an action game on the TurboGrafx-16. One reviewer in Diehard GameFan said the game was satisfactory, while another wished it had more original gameplay.
