= Super Adventure Island =

1992 video game

- North American box art by Greg Martin
- Developer: Produce!
- Publisher: Hudson Soft
- Composer: Yuzo Koshiro
- Series: Adventure Island
- Platform: Super Nintendo Entertainment System
- Release: JP: January 11, 1992; NA: April 1992; PAL: November 19, 1992
- Genre: Platform
- Mode: Single-player

Super Adventure Island (高橋名人の大冒険島, Takahashi Meijin no Daibōken Jima; "Master Takahashi's Great Adventure Island") is a 1992 platform game developed by Produce! and published by Hudson Soft for the Super Nintendo Entertainment System. It was the first Adventure Island game released for the SNES and came out between the releases of the NES games Adventure Island II and Adventure Island 3. It was later followed by Super Adventure Island II. The game's soundtrack was composed by Yuzo Koshiro.

An unrelated game with the same name was released for mobile phones in 2004. This version of Super Adventure Island is a remake of Wonder Boy: Monster Land, which was previously ported to the PC Engine by Hudson as Bikkuriman World.

== Plot ==
Over the course of his adventures, Master Higgins managed to maintain the peace and tranquility of his home, the mystical Adventure Island, and even earned the love and support of the local "Miss Jungle", the lovely Tina (called "Jeannie Jungle" in English materials). At nighttime, the young hero was quietly enjoying a well-deserved rest with his grateful girlfriend Tina loyally leaning on his side atop a treetop (said to be stargazing in the English manual). When the warmth of Tina's soft touch suddenly becomes a chilling coldness, he turns around and is shocked to find that the evil sorcerer, Dark Cloak, used a spell to turn Tina into a stone statue for eternity. Dark Cloak retreats to the legendary Ice Mountain across the sea, and Higgins resolves to defeat the wicked sorcerer in order to restore her to life.

The player controls Higgins as he travels his way through five stages with four areas each. The first three areas in each stage has Higgins fighting his way through an obstacle course, fighting many traps and enemies, in order to reach the goal ball. The final area in each stage consists of a boss battle.

== Gameplay ==
Other than the improved visuals and audio as a result of the switch of hardware to the SNES, the rules of the game are not much different from the original Adventure Island. Although released shortly after Adventure Island II for the NES, Master Higgins' dinosaur companions are not present in this installment. However, Higgins now has a choice between two weapons: the standard stone axe from previous games and a boomerang (which was later introduced in Adventure Island 3). Whereas the axe can only be tossed left or right, Higgins can shoot the boomerang in four directions (up and down, as well as left and right). When Higgins first picks a weapon, he can only toss one shot at a time. By picking up the same weapon in a row, Higgins can toss up to three shots consecutively. When Higgins picks a fourth weapon of the same kind, his shots will turn into fireballs, which are more powerful and capable of destroying stones. At this point, when the player switches from axes to boomerangs or vice versa, the fireball effect will remain in place until the player loses a life. While Higgins has lost the ability to run faster in this game, he has gained the ability to crouch, which can be followed up with a super-jump. During gameplay, Master Higgins must collect tropical fruit in order to keep his life bar from depleting; he also can acquire a skateboard which will allow him to travel across the stage faster.

== Other media ==
Super Adventure Island is one of the video games featuring in the manga titled Cyber Boy, by Nagai Noriaki, published by Coro Coro Comic and Shogakukan, from 1991 to 1993.

== Reception ==
Reception

Review scores
Publication	Score
AllGame	3.5/5
Computer and Video Games	87/100
Electronic Gaming Monthly	7/10, 9/10, 9/10, 8/10
Famitsu	5/10, 6/10, 6/10, 4/10
Game Informer	8.5/10, 9.25/10, 7/10
Game Players	7/10
Games-X	5/5
Nintendo Life	7/10
Super Play	75%
Total!	40%
VideoGames & Computer Entertainment	8/10
Control	70%
Game Zone	75/100
N-Force	87%
SNES Force	84%
Super Action	87%
The Super Famicom	5/10
Super Gamer	42%
Super Pro	42/100

According to Famitsu, Super Adventure Island sold 19,562 copies in its first week on the market and 127,961 copies during its lifetime in Japan. The Japanese publication Micom BASIC Magazine ranked the game fourth in popularity in its April 1992 issue, and it received a 21.3/30 score in a readers' poll conducted by Super Famicom Magazine. It garnered an average reception from critics.

VideoGames & Computer Entertainment's Clayton Walnum noted the developers' decision to swap the positions of the shoot and jump buttons, making the game's controls difficult to use and downright frustrating at first. Super Gamer praised the game's graphics but criticized its gameplay. AllGame's Brett Alan Weiss felt that the game had the same gameplay as its predecessor but with better visuals, a more varied soundtrack, and variety of challenges, but faulted the main character's slow movement and limited jumping.

In 2018, Complex included the game on their best Super Nintendo games of all time list.
