= The 7th Saga =

1993 video game

- North American cover art
- Developer: Produce!
- Publisher: Enix
- Director: Shinji Imada
- Producers: Kouji Mitsumori; Shigeki Maruyama
- Designer: Toshiyuki Suzuki
- Programmer: Takeo Sumita
- Artist: Jun Kusaka
- Writer: Mieko Fukui
- Composer: Norihiko Yamanuki
- Platform: Super Nintendo Entertainment System
- Release: JP: 23 April 1993; NA: September 1993
- Genre: Role-playing
- Mode: Single-player

The 7th Saga (Note: Also known as Elnard (Japanese: エルナード, Hepburn: Erunādo) in Japan.) is a 1993 role-playing video game developed by Produce! and published by Enix for the Super Nintendo Entertainment System. The game made innovative use of a radar system during gameplay. It featured seven playable characters of various types including humans, an elf, a dwarf, robots, a demon, and an alien. Each character has unique items, spells and level/stat progressions.

The game Mystic Ark was planned to be marketed as a sequel to The 7th Saga in North America, but the game was only ever released in Japan.

== Gameplay ==
Kamil Dowonna in a battle encounter

The player chooses one of seven playable characters, all of whom separately embark on a quest to locate seven magical runes. As the player progresses through the game from one town to the next, they encounter the other six characters on multiple occasions. The player may partner with one of the other playable characters to fight as a team, and they may also fight against other playable characters for the runes.

Notable unique innovations include the use of a crystal ball "radar" in the game's HUD that allows players to see enemies approaching their character in dungeons and in the overworld. This means that combat is not totally random, as players may theoretically avoid enemies. However, combat is often difficult to avoid as enemies are numerous and move extremely quickly at random, and terrain features that may aid in evasion or navigation are absent in the crystal ball. The game also uses Mode 7 graphic effects to create the transition between exploration screen and battle screen.

There are three modes of play: safe area, enemy-infested area, and in-battle. When the characters are in a safe area, usually in a city, they can walk around as long as they want. The player can talk to non-player characters, buy and sell items, search for hidden items, and rest at an inn. Also, the main character may duel other characters, or even convince one to assist in the search for the runes.

When the player is in an enemy-infested area, the Magic Crystal item in the top-left appears. That crystal shows the player in the center, and the relative locations of nearby enemies, cities, dungeons, and runes. If a white dot reaches the center, i.e. the location of the main characters, a battle will break out. The player must move around quickly while grabbing chests and finding the way, since the enemies are always getting closer.

Battles in the game are turn-based. When the player character is in battle, the perspective shows the character and ally, if any, from behind looking at one to three enemies. Players then select an action and take turns with the enemy and ally. The player can attack, defend, cast a spell, use an item, or run. If the player wins, their characters get experience points, gold, and occasionally items. If they lose, half of their money will be gone. If the player loses to one of the other main characters, their rune(s) will be taken by that character. Gaining experience results in attaining levels which improve a character's skill. Buying better weapons and armor with the money improves a character's fighting ability.

The game is particularly known for its unforgiving difficulty due to balance changes made in its localization. Enemies were given much higher stats, and the player character's stat increases were reduced (the other playable characters retain the original stat increases, so they will always surpass the player character's level).

== Story ==
The game takes place on a world called Ticondera. Five thousand years before the beginning of the story, a divine being named Saro defeated an evil entity named Gorsia with the power of seven runes. In the years since then, the runes have been scattered across the globe. Lemele (Remeer in the Japanese version), the son of Saro, was born 100 years before the beginning of the game, and became a hero when he defeated the demon Gariso. Now 100 years old, Lemele has become the benevolent and powerful ruler of the world.

The seven characters are recruited from various walks of life and corners of the globe by the elderly King Lemele. After five years of training at his palace, Lemele dispatches his seven apprentices in a quest for the seven runes. Each rune possesses a great power that can be used by the person who wields it. The one who collects all seven runes will become Lemele's heir. To find the runes, the king gives each character a Crystal Ball to assist them in their search.

Retrieving the runes means confronting the various powerful tyrants who have come to possess them, including wizards, kings, and dragons. The apprentices are also being hunted by a persistent bounty hunter named Pison (Python in the Japanese version), who has been hired by one of the apprentices to eliminate the rest (the identity of the "traitor" apprentice is randomized with each new game).

After defeating a resurrected Gariso and collecting all seven runes, the player is confronted by Lemele, who reveals that he is actually Gorsia. Gorsia traveled to the present from 5,000 years in the past, killed Lemele and took his identity, then recruited the seven apprentices to locate the runes for him. The power each rune contains is actually a trapped portion of Gorsia's power. Gorsia destroys the runes, re-absorbs his lost power, and zaps the player with lightning, sending them to a strange, unfamiliar world which turns out to be Ticondera 5,000 years in the past.

After passing through several towns, the player eventually ends up in the technologically advanced city of Melenam, which was originally explored as ruins by the player early in the game. Melenam is revealed to be the origin of the Tetsujin robots, and the player witnesses the destruction of the city at the hands of a rogue super-Tetsujin created by the city's scientists for the purposes of fighting Gorsia.

The player eventually learns that although Saro had recently defeated Gorsia, Gorsia has returned from the future and fatally wounded Saro. Saro's disciples give the player the seven runes, which the player uses to seal Gorsia's powers and eventually defeat the evil being. The dying Gorsia kills the player in one last act of revenge, but 4,900 years later Saro reincarnates the player's soul as a young baby and Saro's son: none other than Lemele.

== Characters ==
Characters in The 7th Saga run along a continuum from predominantly physical-oriented to predominantly magical-oriented. They are, in that order:

- Wilme Pelin: An alien with a fiery, lava-like spiked body. Arrogant and aggressive, he seems to want the runes for power and to prove his superiority. He is strong and has the highest HP of the seven and is tied with the casters for highest speed but suffers from a fixed set of equipment, and a low Magic rating causes his Fire magic to be quite impotent. Best used with characters very reliant on gear as using Wilme will save you a lot of gold.
- LUX TIZER: A 5000-year-old robot created by a long extinct civilization called the Tetsujin. LUX is polite, logical, and inquisitive. He searches for the runes in the hopes that their power may help him unlock the secrets of the Tetsujin's origins. LUX is physically very powerful especially in defense, but has a limited selection of magic and equipments, although he is the only one that can use those spells. Among these are the only Laser and Thunder spells usable by a non-NPC character. Along with Esuna, LUX can never be the "traitor" apprentice. Like Wilme, is great with partners who rely on equipment since he doesn't really get any equipment.
- Olvan Jaess: An extremely old dwarf warrior, with a pleasant personality. He joins the search for the runes in the hopes that they can restore his youth. Statistically, he is similar to Kamil, but with more HP and Defense, and less MP and speed, and a few differences in equipment/spell selection. Specifically Defense 1 which can help him be even tankier or help his partner.
- Kamil Dowonna: A human knight. The most average, well-rounded character, Kamil has access to a large selection of equipment and can cast both offensive and defensive magic. He wears blue armor and the instruction booklet says that he is best paired with a stronger ally. Unfortunately, the characters all-round average stats makes him the worst character in the game. His health is too low to properly tank, his mana and spellcasting are too low to be a proper mage and his speed is tied with Olvan for being the worst in the game. The equipment he can equip can make up for his lower Power and Defense stats and the spells he can learn can help his partner but there are a lot of better options.
- Lejes Rimul: A power-hungry demon. Sly, manipulative and unapologetically evil, Lejes wants the power of the runes in order to rule the world. Lejes equips very strong weapons and eventually learns every single attack spell (except the LUX-exclusive Laser and Thunder spells), but his selection of armor is quite poor, and his attack spells hit with less force than Esuna. Lejes never learns any healing magic. However, he exclusively learns Defense 2 which halves the targets defense instead of doubling it like Defense 1. This increases the physical damage he can dish out significantly and any partner that is with him. Since he learns this early on (lvl 9) this makes him a lot more physically oriented than spellcasting despite his wide variety of spells.
- Valsu Saizer: A human cleric who has dedicated his life to the cause of good, Valsu wishes to use the runes to bring peace and prosperity to the world. He is depicted as a young man in the Japanese game art, but as elderly in the North American release. He has excellent healing magic and one powerful Ice spell, but lacks skill in physical combat. He is the only playable character who learns the spells Agility and Elixir, making him a powerful ally.
- Esuna Busy: An elf magic user, Esuna seems to regard the search for the runes as some sort of fun adventure. She begins the game cocky and headstrong, but becomes more uncertain and less confident as the story progresses. She has extremely high Speed and Magic potency, and can use both kinds of magic, but her attack spells are exclusively Ice-elemental and she is physically very weak. Like LUX, Esuna never turns out to be the "traitor" apprentice.

== Reception ==
Reception

Aggregate score
| Aggregator | Score |
|---|---|
| GameRankings | 64.38% |

Review scores
| Publication | Score |
|---|---|
| Dragon | 3/5 |
| Electronic Gaming Monthly | 8/10, 8/10, 7/10, 8/10, 7/10 |
| Famitsu | 7/10, 7/10, 7/10, 5/10 |
| Game Informer | 8/10 |
| GamesMaster | 46/100 |
| Nintendo Power | 3.6/5 |
| Official Nintendo Magazine | 80/100 |
| Super Play | 69% |
| Total! | 2+ |
| Hippon Super! | 6/10 |
| Marukatsu Super Famicom | 6/10, 7/10, 9/10, 7/10 |
| Super Control | 78% |

According to Famitsu, The 7th Saga sold 5,144 copies in its first week on the market and 9,064 copies during its lifetime in Japan. The game received a 20.27/30 score in a 1993 readers' poll conducted by Super Famicom Magazine, ranking among Super Famicom titles at the number 179 spot. It received a mixed reception, holding a rating of 64.38% based on four reviews according to review aggregator GameRankings.

GamePro applauded the game's graphics, animation, music, sound effects, and non-linearity of the plot, but criticized the combat and puzzles. The reviewer elaborated that the enemy monsters are tactically too similar to each other, making the player's choices of action essentially meaningless, which in combination with the frequent rate at which enemies are encountered makes combat quickly become a chore rather than fun. He also felt that the limited dialogue would disappoint fans of story-driven RPGs like Final Fantasy IV. Mike Weigand of Electronic Gaming Monthly was enthusiastic about its Mode 7 effects and non-linear gameplay.

== Proposed sequel ==
Enix planned to market the game Mystic Ark as a sequel to The 7th Saga in North America, under the title 7th Saga II, but the game's localization was never completed, and it was released only in Japan under its original name.
