= Adventure Island: The Beginning =

2009 video game

- Developer: Hudson Soft
- Publisher: Hudson Soft
- Series: Adventure Island
- Platform: WiiWare
- Release: JP: April 7, 2009; PAL: April 24, 2009; NA: May 25, 2009
- Genre: Platform
- Modes: Single-player, multiplayer

Adventure Island: The Beginning, known in Japan as Takahashi Meijin no Bōken Jima Wii (高橋名人の冒険島Wii, "Master Takahashi's Adventure Island Wii"), is a platform game released for the Wii's WiiWare service. It was developed and published by Hudson Soft.

== Gameplay ==
The game features gameplay similar to the Nintendo Entertainment System version of Adventure Island, but with a 3D graphics makeover. Players control Master Higgins, running and jumping through levels and dispatching enemies with axes, boomerangs and spears. They must also collect food items in order to maintain a constantly depleting vitality meter. Players can also upgrade their abilities and weapons by finding golden melons and trading them in at a shop on the overworld map.

The game also features four minigames, including skateboarding (that uses the motion sensing of the Wii Remote), axe throwing and a virtual re-creation of Hudson's 16-Shot handheld gaming device, which measures how many button presses a player can achieve in a second.

== Reception ==
Reception

Aggregate score
Aggregator	Score
Metacritic	60/100

Review scores
Publication	Score
GameRevolution	D+
IGN	7/10
Jeuxvideo.com	10/20
Nintendo Life	7/10
Official Nintendo Magazine	70%
Teletext GameCentral	5/10

The game received "mixed" reviews according to the review aggregation website Metacritic.

Prior to release, the game had been criticized by several reviewers who previewed it. JC Fletcher of Joystiq criticized the 3D makeover, saying that "we do wish that Hudson had taken the Mega Man 9 route, because the 3D makeover isn't working". Ray Barnholt of 1Up.com noted that the game looked "remarkably similar" to Hudson Selection Adventure Island, the previously released GameCube and PlayStation 2 remake of the first game, and felt that the graphics in the remake were "more appealing" than their Adventure Island: The Beginning rendition. IGN's review called it "an enjoyable, entertaining update to a classic franchise" but lamented the lack of improvements to the presentation. GamePro said, "The game hasn't strayed far from the original at all, except that you don't die after one hit like the original, unless you fall in fire." (Note: GamePro gave the game three 3/5 scores for graphics, control, and fun factor, and 2.5/5 for sound.)
