= Adventure Island (video game) =

1986 video game

- North American NES box art
- Developer: Hudson Soft
- Publisher: Hudson Soft
- Artist: Susumu Matsushita
- Composer: Jun Chikuma
- Series: Adventure Island
- Platforms: NES, MSX, Game Boy Advance, GameCube, PlayStation 2
- Release: NES: JP: September 12, 1986; NA: September 1988; PAL: 1992; MSX: JP: September 12, 1986
- Genre: Platform
- Mode: Single-player

Hudson's Adventure Island, known as Takahashi Meijin no Bōken Jima (高橋名人の冒険島; Master Takahashi's Adventure Island) in Japan and also known as Adventure Island, (Note: Released in the NES PAL-A region as Adventure Island Classic, and in the PAL-B region as Adventure Island in the Pacific) is a platform game produced by Hudson Soft that was released in Japan for the Famicom and MSX on September 12, 1986. It was released in North America for the Nintendo Entertainment System in 1988 and in the PAL region in 1992.

Adventure Island is an adaptation of the arcade game Wonder Boy, developed by Escape for Sega. It was followed by a series of sequels with no connection to the Wonder Boy series.

== Plot ==
The player controls Master Higgins (known as Master Wigins in the United Kingdom, as Capulinita in Mexico and as Takahashi Meijin in Japanese versions), a young man who ventured to Adventure Island in the South Pacific after hearing that the Evil Witch Doctor kidnapped Princess Tina. To rescue her, Higgins must survive a series of 32 stages. There are eight worlds called "areas", which are divided into four stages or "rounds" each, which are further divided into four checkpoints. When the player reaches the fourth round of each area, he must confront a boss at the end to continue to the next area. The game is completed when the player saves the girl after defeating the eighth and final form of the evil lord.

== Gameplay ==
The first stage in the NES version

Master Higgins (the player character) loses a life whenever he touches an enemy, an enemy's attack, a fire roast, or when he falls into a pitfall or a body of water. The player also has a health gauge that starts out with 11 points, which gradually depletes over time or whenever Higgins trips on a rock in his path. When Higgins' health gauge reaches zero, he will lose a life. If Higgins still has extra lives, he will revive at the last checkpoint he passed through. The game ends when all of Higgins' lives run out. To replenish his health, Higgins can pick up fruit or a milk bottle and has a maximum health of up to 16 points. When the player's score reaches 50,000 points, 100,000 points, and 200,000 points, Higgins will receive an extra life. Finding a bee-like fairy known as Honey Girl will grant Higgins invincibility for about ten seconds and allow him to kill enemies with a single touch. Also hidden in each stage is a special pot, which doubles the player's end-of-stage bonus.

Higgins starts off each life without the ability to attack and can only gain the ability to attack by picking up a stone axe, which can be found in specific spots in each stage. When Higgins is wielding the stone axe, he can trade it for magical fireballs that have longer range and are capable of destroying rocks and rolling stones (which are invulnerable to the stone axe).

To break an egg, the player must touch it or hit it with a weapon twice. In addition to weapons, there are numerous bonus items inside. There is also the possibility of receiving a negative item, the eggplant, which drains Higgins' life meter. Some of the eggs are not immediately visible in plain sight. The locations of these "hidden eggs" are usually indicated when a weapon thrown by a player disappears before falling to the ground and are uncovered by jumping at the indicated spot. Some of these hidden spots do not contain hidden eggs, but instead a cloud that will warp the player to a bonus stage, which is instead uncovered by standing still for a short period of time. During bonus stages, the player can collect a series of fruits (each worth 500 points regardless of the type) until Higgins falls into a pitfall. However, instead of losing a life, he will return to the regular stage at the next checkpoint.

At the fourth round of each area, Higgins will confront a different form of the Evil Witch Doctor, the game's boss character. He has the ability to change his head by up to eight different types. Higgins must defeat him by striking his head a specific number of times with his weapon. The number of hits required to defeat him increases with each area (his first form requires eight hits and every subsequent form requires two additional hits until the eighth and final form, which requires 22 hits). When the Evil Witch Doctor is defeated, he will change his head and escape to the next area. He uses the same attack in each form, with the only changes being his durability, speed and the speed of his fireball attacks. When Higgins defeats his final form, the Evil Witch Doctor will fall into a pit and the girl will be rescued.

== Development ==
=== Relation to Wonder Boy ===
Adventure Island began development as a direct port of the Sega arcade game Wonder Boy, the partial rights to which Hudson Soft obtained from developer Escape (now known as Westone Bit Entertainment). However, the developer had already signed away ownership of the Wonder Boy name and characters to Sega, so Hudson created a new protagonist modeled and named after Hudson Soft's spokesman Takahashi Meijin. In the western version of Adventure Island, the Takahashi Meijin character was renamed Master Higgins.

While the Wonder Boy series adopted an action RPG system for its sequels (beginning with Wonder Boy in Monster Land), most of the Adventure Island sequels stuck to the game system of the original Wonder Boy. Moreover, Hudson Soft also obtained the rights to port all of the Wonder Boy sequels to the TurboGrafx-16, changing the title and character designs of each game (with the exception of Wonder Boy III: Monster Lair). Incidentally, the Japanese version of Dragon's Curse (the TurboGrafx-16 adaptation of Wonder Boy III: The Dragon's Trap) was titled Adventure Island.

In 2004 Hudson Soft adapted Wonder Boy in Monster Land to mobile phones as Super Adventure Island.

The rights to the Adventure Island series are currently owned by Konami, who absorbed Hudson Soft in 2012.

== Re-releases ==
The NES version of Adventure Island was re-released in Japan for the Game Boy Advance as a Famicom Mini title on May 21, 2004. It was later re-released internationally for the Virtual Console service in 2008 for the Wii and in 2014 for the Wii U.

A remake was also developed for the PlayStation 2 and GameCube titled Hudson Selection Volume 4: Takahashi Meijin no Bōken Jima, which was released exclusively in Japan on December 18, 2003.

=== Sequels ===
Two sequels were produced for the NES, Adventure Island II and Adventure Island 3, as well as a fourth game for the Famicom that was released exclusively in Japan titled Takahashi Meijin no Bōken Jima IV. In addition to the standalone Famicom Mini re-release of the first game, all four games were re-released in a compilation for the Game Boy Advance titled Hudson Best Collection Vol 6: Bōken Jima Collection, released in Japan on January 19, 2006.

Sequels were also released on other platforms, such as Adventure Island and Adventure Island II for the Game Boy (based on the second and third NES games respectively), Super Adventure Island and Super Adventure Island II for the Super NES, New Adventure Island for the TurboGrafx-16, Adventure Island: The Beginning for the Wii, Gacha wa shi Meijin no Bōken Jima in 2007 for mobile, and Adventure Island Quest by Takahashi Meijin in 2010 for mobile.

=== Appearances in other games ===
Takahashi Meijin appears as a playable character in the crossover fighting game DreamMix TV World Fighters, released in Japan for GameCube on December 13, 2003.

Takahashi Meijin appears in the mobile game Gacha Washi Meijin no Bōken Jima in 2007, a cross-over between the Gachapin series and the Adventure Island series.

Takahashi Meijin also appears in the sport mobile game Gachapin & Mukku no Dai Undoukai ("Gachapin & Mukku's Big Sports Day") in 2008, and crosses over with Katamari franchise in the mobile game Takahashi Meijin and Katamari Damacy in 2010.

Takahashi Meijin also appears in the pachinko mobile game Pachinko Takahashi Meijin no Bouken Jima in 2008.

== Reception ==
Reception

Aggregate score
Aggregator	Score
GameRankings	NES: 62%

Review scores
Publication	Score
AllGame	3/5
Eurogamer	5/10
GameSpot	6.5/10

GameSpot said Adventure Island was a "fast-paced, challenging platformer". GamesRadar+ ranked it the 23rd best NES game ever made. The staff praised it for the fact that its challenge comes from quality level design and not low quality. It is widely regarded as one of the most difficult NES games.

== Other media ==
- Famicom Runner: Takahashi Meijin Monogatari

ファミコンランナー高橋名人物語
- Manga
- Written by: Kazuyoshi Kawai
- Published by: CoroCoro Comic
- Published: April 1986 – February 1988
- Volumes: 1

- Honey Bee in Toycomland

Bugってハニー (Bug-tte Honey)
- Genre: Adventure
- Anime television series
- Directed by: Minoru Okazaki
- Produced by: Hidehiko Takei; Shunzo Kato; Yasutaka Tarumi
- Written by: Kasumi Oka
- Music by: Hiroshi Tsutsui
- Studio: Tokyo Movie Shinsha
- Original network: NNS (NTV)
- Original run: October 3, 1986 – September 25, 1987
- Episodes: 51
- Anime film

Bug-tte Honey: Megalom Shōjo Rondo 4622
- Directed by: Akinori Nagaoka
- Produced by: Shunzo Kato
- Written by: Kasumi Oka
- Music by: Hiroshi Tsutsui
- Studio: Tokyo Movie Shinsha
- Released: July 21, 1987
- Runtime: 48 minutes

=== Manga ===
- Famicom Runner: Takahashi Meijin Monogatari (ファミコンランナー高橋名人物語, Lit. "Famicom Runner: Master Takahashi's Story") is a manga based on Hudson Soft's character Bee and Takahashi Meijin, was released in April 1986 to February 1988 in Japan, was published by CoroCoro Comics, and created by Kazuyoshi Kawai.

=== Anime ===
- Adventure Island also inspired an animated television series titled Honey Bee in Toycomland (Bugってハニー, Bug-tte Honey), which was produced by TMS Entertainment and aired in Japan from October 3, 1986, to September 25, 1987, lasting 51 episodes and a theatrical film. The series also inspired its own Famicom game titled Takahashi Meijin no Bug-tte Honey (高橋名人のBUGってハニー), released on June 5, 1987. The TV series featured Honey Girl (the bee-like fairy who grants Higgins temporary invincibility in the original game) as a major character. The plot involved the kidnapping of Takahashi (Master Higgins) and his lady friend. Honey Girl's mission is to rescue him by enlisting the help of One-Up, Dal, and Midori, three Earth children who also happen to be video game aces. The series featured Minoru Maeda (known for his contributions to the anime versions of Dragon Ball) as character designer, and featured storylines incorporating elements of various popular video games of the day. Another Hudson character, Bomberman, makes a cameo in the second episode.
