= Case Closed: Captured in Her Eyes =

- Theatrical release poster
- Kanji: 名探偵コナン 瞳の中の暗殺者
- Revised Hepburn: Meitantei Conan: Hitomi no Naka no Ansatsusha
- Directed by: Kenji Kodama
- Screenplay by: Kazunari Kouchi
- Based on: Case Closed by Gosho Aoyama
- Produced by: Michihiko Suwa
- Starring: Minami Takayama; Kappei Yamaguchi; Wakana Yamazaki; Akira Kamiya; Gara Takashima; Megumi Hayashibara; Naoko Matsui; Yukiko Iwai; Ikue Ōtani; Wataru Takagi; Atsuko Yuya; Kenichi Ogata; Kaneto Shiozawa; Chafurin
- Cinematography: Takashi Nomura
- Edited by: Terumitsu Okada
- Music by: Katsuo Ōno
- Production company: TMS Entertainment
- Distributed by: Toho
- Release date: April 22, 2000
- Running time: 95 minutes
- Country: Japan
- Language: Japanese
- Box office: ¥ 2.5 billion (US$ 25.31 million)

Case Closed: Captured in Her Eyes, known as Detective Conan: Captured in Her Eyes (名探偵コナン 瞳の中の暗殺者, Meitantei Conan: Hitomi no Naka no Ansatsusha) in Japan, is a 2000 Japanese animated mystery film and the fourth feature film based on the Case Closed series. It was directed by Kenji Kodama and released on April 22, 2000, in Japan and December 29, 2009, in the United States. This film achieved a box office income of 2.5 billion Japanese yen.

== Plot ==
In the flashback, Shinichi Kudo taking Ran Mouri to the fountain at Tropical Land, the local amusement park. In the present, Conan Edogawa (using Shinichi's voice) calls Ran in a phone booth and she asks if they could go back to Tropical Land. The Detective Boys passes by causing Conan to quickly hang up and have come up with a new riddle but Conan solves it easily. Genta Kojima tries to cross a busy street, but policeman named Osamu Narasawa stops him and advises the Detective Boys and Conan to wait for the next green light. When they finish crossing, Conan turns to see a mysterious man with an umbrella shoot Osamu. The man runs, and Conan attempts to give chase but is unable to. When Conan asks Osamu if he knew who shot him, the man grabs for his notebook and succumbs to his injuries.

The Detective Boys is taken to a police conference because they were witnesses to the crime. However, the conference goes nowhere as Ayumi Yoshida, Mitsuhiko Tsuburaya, and Genta disagree on how the killer looked. Conan states that the killer's raincoat and umbrella were both a shade of gray, remembering that the umbrella was in their right hand, proving that the killer was left-handed, as the gun was shot with the left. Later, a woman in a garage finds detective named Shiba shot to death, who was holding his police notebook in his right hand. The following morning, Kogoro asks Juzo Megure for more details, but Megure hangs up, saying that he is busy. Megure is shown talking to Ninzaburou Shiratori, saying that the information only the two of them know must remain a secret.

Shiratori's sister later has a party to bless her marriage. When Kogoro sees Megure again, he tries to get info, but Megure remains silent. Conan realizes that Megure may know something that is kept confidential. Kogoro and Conan later try to blackmail Wataru Takagi using the info that Takagi likes Miwako Sato. Takagi tells Kogoro and Conan that the second victim held his notebook during his dying moments, something not mentioned to the media. Shiratori appears and tells Kogoro that all the info he will be getting, and that he "need not to know." Conan thinks of the words and fears the killer may be associated to the police force, or the entire force itself.

Sonoko Suzuki and Ran are shown asking the latter's mother Eri Kisaki how Kogoro proposed to her, while Sato goes to the restroom. Ran runs into her as she leaves. The killer then sets off a bomb, cutting off power to the floor. Ran picks up a flashlight from under the sink, which the killer uses to shoot. Sato, however, shields Ran and is shot multiple times, causing the light from the flashlight shines on the killer's face. Sato is shown unconscious, and Ran faints when she sees her bloody hands, blaming herself for what has happened and faints. At the hospital, Megure states Sato has a 50/50 chance of living. Surgeon-turned-psychiatrist Kyosuke Kazato diagnoses Ran with amnesia, explaining that she lost memories of everybody she knew, including the memories of the current day.

Megure decides to reveal the info about the case to Kogoro. A gifted surgeon named Tamotsu Jinno got drunk and committed suicide by slitting his neck. Inspector Tomonari led the investigation with his subordinates Osamu, Shiba, and Sato. During the case, Tomonari suffered a heart attack, insists that no one worry, and to continue the stakeout. Sato is forced to send Tomonari to the hospital, where he dies from his condition. The remaining two see the targets, noticing that one of them is Toshiro Odarigi's son, Toshiya. The case was, however, abruptly concluded as suicide. Megure concludes his description of the case by informing that Kazunobu Chiba and the others have recently been investigating the case on their free time. Someone has been stalking Ran in the hospital's courtyard and inside her hospital room, leading Conan to inform Kogoro that she may have seen the culprit, which makes her a possible target.

The next day, the Detective Boys stays with Ran, acting as bodyguards. Ai Haibara remarks that it may be better if Ran's memory wouldn't return and that she wished she lost hers too. It can be noted that she reveals feelings for Conan, only to put it off as a joke. While at her house, Ran states she is nostalgic when she sees Shinichi's picture. The Detective Boys, not knowing Conan is Shinichi, criticizes Shinichi for being insensitive for not returning to visit Ran. Conan is visibly upset and angry about the situation. That same night, Ran asks Conan about Shinichi.

The following day, Ran, Eri, and Conan are waiting at the Beika City railway station to go shopping when suddenly, the killer pushes Ran off onto the rails, only for Conan to save her life. Conan investigates the people related to Jinno, which leads him to finally realize who the killer is. A major breakthrough, however, is that Jinno cut the surgeon who was operating on a patient who suffered from a heart attack. This apparently caused the patient's death. Ran, at the hospital, sees Tropical Land on television, prompting the others to take her there hoping it helps with her memory. Takagi later goes to the restroom, and a mascot character of Tropical Land approaches Ran. The Detective Boys chases the mascot and takes it down. Kogoro removes the mascot head revealing Makoto, son of the late Tomonari. He also finds the knife in his chest pocket. Makoto claims innocence, but the police arrest him anyway.

The Detective Boys celebrate their victory, but Ai doubts that this is the end. Meanwhile, Tamaki, the freelance journalist and the sister of late Jinno, is watching Toshiya quietly with a smirk on her face. Kogoro tells Ran that he's going to the police station for questioning and also tells her to stay at the Tropical Land until she regains her memory. At the police station, Makoto is questioned. He reveals that he wasn't approaching Ran but instead he wanted to talk to Kogoro for his help; his knife was for protection from the killer. The men are stunned at Makoto's confessions, and realize Ran is in grave danger. Back at Tropical Land, the real killer attacks Ran, but Dr. Agasa protects her and is shot himself. Conan rushes to her aid and quickly takes her deep into Tropical Land, boarding a speedboat with the killer tailing right behind them on his own.

When the killer corners them at a volcano, Conan lays down his theories. The killer is revealed to be the surgeon whose hand was cut by Jinno, Kazato. He murdered Jinno as revenge for having injured his hands, ruining his promising career. After Kazato resigned, he became a psychiatrist, was consulted by one of the officers under the late Tomonari, and found out that Jinno's case was reopened. Kazato would go on and murder all the connections to the case. Ran became a target because she saw his face when he attacked Sato. Conan and Ran escape via a tunnel from Kazato temporarily. Kazato catches up with them, and Conan concludes his presentation, explaining how Kazato shot Sato through an umbrella prepared with a hole in it, thus leaving no gun residue on his clothes when he stuck his arm through the hole and fired his weapon. As evidence, the victims were referring to the heart, which is a pun on Kazato past profession as a heart surgeon.

Kazato approaches with a gun, and Ran asks Conan why is he protecting her, to which Conan replies that he loves her. They evade Kazato again, and Conan takes Ran to the fountain, the same place where Shinichi took Ran a long time ago. Kazato finds them and starts shooting at Conan. As the fountain turns on, Ran breaks free of her amnesia, able to remember Sato protecting her previously and has flashbacks of multiple events, including one where she witnesses Kazato's face. The fountain turns off, giving Conan the chance to kick a Coca-Cola can at Kazato, knocking him out. He wakes up while Conan does not notice, and right when he is about to stab Conan, Ran breaks the blade with her kick, shocking Kazato. She then recalls all the events and proceeds to brutally knock out Kazato, finally defeating him. Everyone then appears and Kazato is taken into custody. News later comes that Sato survived the surgery and will be making a full recovery, much to Takagi's delight.

In the post-credits scene, Ran tells Conan the line Kogoro told Eri was that he loved her more than anything else in the world, leaving Conan saying that he can't believe he used the same pick-up line as that stupid old man, referring to Kogoro.

== Cast ==
Character	Japanese	English
Conan Edogawa	Minami Takayama	Alison Retzloff
Shinichi Kudo / Jimmy Kudo	Kappei Yamaguchi	Jerry Jewell
Mitsuhiko Tsuburaya / Mitch Tennyson	Ikue Ohtani	Cynthia Cranz
Kogoro Mouri / Richard Moore	Akira Kamiya	R. Bruce Elliott
Ran Mouri / Rachel Moore	Wakana Yamazaki	Colleen Clinkenbeard
Ai Haibara / Vi Graythorn	Megumi Hayashibara	Brina Palencia
Genta Kojima / George Kaminski	Wataru Takagi	Mike McFarland
Wataru Takagi / Harry Wilder	Wataru Takagi	Doug Burks
Ayumi Yoshida / Amy Yeager	Yukiko Iwai	Monica Rial
Sonoko Suzuki / Serena Sebastian	Naoko Matsui	Laura Bailey
Juzo Megure / Joseph Meguire	Chafurin	Mark Stoddard
Dr. Hiroshi Agasa	Kenichi Ogata	Bill Flynn
Ninzaburou Shiratori / Nicholas Santos	Kaneto Shiozawa	Eric Vale
Kazunobu Chiba	Isshin Chiba	Chris Cason
Eri Kisaki / Eva Kaden	Gara Takashima	Julie Mayfield
Kousuke Kazato / Christian Clemendale	Kazuhiko Inoue	
Tamotsu Jinno / Thomas Jinno	Naoya Uchida	
Makoto Tomonari / Michael Tomlinson	Toshiyuki Morikawa	

== Music ==
The film's theme song is "Anata ga Iru kara" by Miho Komatsu (arranged by Daisuke Ikeda).

== Home media ==
=== VHS ===
The VHS of the film was released on April 21, 2001. It was discontinued soon after 2006 as it was switched to DVD.

=== Region 2 DVD ===
The DVD of the film was released on January 24, 2001. A new DVD was released on February 25, 2011, significantly lowering the original price and added the trailer as a special feature.

=== Region 1 DVD ===
FUNimation Entertainment released the English dub of Case Closed - Movie: Captured in Her Eyes on Region 1 DVD on December 29, 2009.

=== Blu-ray ===
The Blu-ray version of the film was released on May 27, 2011. The Blu-ray contains the same content of the DVD plus a mini-booklet explaining the film and the BD-live function.
