= Adventure Island 3 =

1992 video game

- North American NES box art by Greg Martin
- Developer: Now Production
- Publisher: Hudson Soft
- Composers: Miyoshi Okuyama; Hirohiko Takayama
- Series: Adventure Island
- Platforms: Nintendo Entertainment System, Game Boy
- Release: NES: JP: July 31, 1992; NA: September 1992; Game Boy: NA: February 1993; JP: February 26, 1993; EU: 1993
- Genre: Platform
- Mode: Single-player

Adventure Island 3 (Note: Japanese: 高橋名人の冒険島III, Hepburn: Takahashi Meijin no Bōken Jima Surī) is a side-scrolling platform game published by Hudson Soft that was originally released for the Nintendo Entertainment System in 1992. It is the third game in the Adventure Island series released for the NES. Like Adventure Island II (1991), it was developed by Now Production. Adventure Island 3 involves Master Higgins rescuing Jeannie Jungle who has been captured by Aliens. He seeks the kidnappers out through various islands with the help of his dinosaur friends.

Adventure Island 3 was released in Japan on July 31, 1992 for the Famicom. A port was also released for the Game Boy in 1993 as Adventure Island II: Aliens in Paradise. (Note: Japanese: 高橋名人の冒険島III, Hepburn: Takahashi Meijin no Bouken Jima III)

== Gameplay ==
Gameplay from first level of NES version

In Adventure Island 3, a woman named Jeannie Jungle has been captured by aliens, leading to the bumbling hero Master Higgins to give chase through eight islands to rescue her.

In the game, the player controls Master Higgins move in a 2-dimensional plane where he can jump and swim, run and throw weapons. Higgins moves through each area with a timer counting down that acts as an energy bar. The player can collect fruits, milk, or meat items to keep replenishing it.

Items are hidden eggs that can be opened through using weapons or jumping on them. Within them are weapon upgrades, energy bar restoring items, and keys that can lead to secret areas. Also hidden in eggs are one of Higgin's five dinosaur friends. Each dinosaur is a different color-coded species and has unique powers, such as a Pteranodon which allows the power of flight, a Elasmosaurus which can swim fast and others that allows for more grip on icy platforms or allow Higgins to traverse lava. If the player is hit when riding a dinosaur, the dinosaur quickly abandons Higgins.

Sometimes an item appears in eggs that is detrimental such as an Eggplant that will make Master Higgins energy meter shorten faster. At the beginning of each level, the player can select an item such as weapon choices such as boomerangs or axes, a "Honey Girl" items that cause invincibility, a "Time-Stop" which allows for the timer to freeze temporarily, or dinosaur partners. The player can only select one of each before a level.

== Development and release ==
Hudson Soft had Adventure Island 3 developed by Now Production. Now Production was created in 1986 and had previously made earlier Famicom games without credit such as Splatterhouse: Wanpaku Graffiti (1989) for Namco and Yo! Noid (1990) for Capcom. Adventure Island 3 was one of the three Adventure Island NES games developed by Now, along with Adventure Island II (1991) and later Adventure Island IV (1994).

In Japan, Adventure Island 3 was released for the Famicom on July 31, 1992. Hudson Soft presented Adventure Island 3 at the 1992 Summer Consumer Electronics Show (CES) in Chicago, a showcase for games expected within the second half of the year. It received an English-language release in September 1992 for the Nintendo Entertainment System (NES).

Adventure Island II: Aliens in Paradise was developed for the Game Boy, and is based on the Adventure Island 3 game for the NES. This version was titled Takahashi Meijin no Bouken Jima III in Japan and Adventure Island II: Aliens in Paradise for its English-language release. It was released for the Game Boy on February 26, 1993 in Japan and received an English-language release in February 1993.

The NES version of Adventure Island 3 was re-released on January 19, 2006 for the Game Boy Advance in Japan as volume six in their Hudson Best Collection video game compilation series. This release also included the other three Adventure Island games originally released for the Famicom.

== Reception ==
Reception

Review scores
Publication	Score	
Publication	Game Boy	NES
AllGame		3.5/5
Electronic Gaming Monthly	8/10, 8/10, 8/10, 7/10	
Famitsu	6/10, 6/10, 5/10, 4/10	4/10, 7/10, 6/10, 5/10
Nintendo Life	9/10	
Video Games	71%	

From contemporary reviews, Nintendo Power reviewers George and Rob stated that game was very similar to the previous Adventure Island games, with George mentioning it became "very challenging in advanced stages" while Rob considered the game likable, but not groundbreaking. In GamePro, a reviewer said the NES game felt like a re-run of an old television series as the game's structure and presentation are nearly identical to the earlier games in the series and that the graphics and music were not as strong as other NES games like Super Mario Bros. 3.

Reviewing the Game Boy port, Martin Klugkist in Total! said the game was pretty average and "typical Game Boy monotony" with no new ideas and middling background graphics, music and sound. Klugkist only recommended it to dedicated fans of platform games while suggesting Super Mario Land 2 as a superior similar title. A reviewer in Play Time said the game was simple and implemented successfully, recommending it during due the current popular cycle of Dinosaur-related media.

From retrospective reviews, a review in Allgame said the NES version was not too different from the previous Adventure Island game, noting only the addition of a new dinosaur partner and that the graphics, sounds and gameplay are on par with Adventure Island II.
