= Super Adventure Island II =

1994 video game

- North American cover art
- Developers: Make Software, Inc.
- Publisher: Hudson Soft
- Designers: T. Kazaku; S.U. Bandit; Karayan; Sadamasa Ono
- Composers: Akihiro Akamatsu; Sachiko Oita; Shinji Nakaya
- Series: Adventure Island
- Platform: Super Nintendo Entertainment System
- Release: NA: October 1994; JP: January 3, 1995; EU: March 1995
- Genres: Platform, Metroidvania
- Mode: Single-player

Super Adventure Island II (高橋名人の大冒険島II, Takahashi Meijin no Daibōken Jima Tsū; "Master Takahashi's Great Adventure Island II") is a platform video game released by Hudson Soft for the Super NES in 1994 in North America, with subsequent releases in Japan and Europe following in 1995. Unlike most of the previous games, it is a platformer with action-adventure elements that encourages exploration, similar to the later Wonder Boy games.

== Story ==
Following on from New Adventure Island, in this game Master Higgins, along with his wife Tina, are stricken by a storm while on their honeymoon. Both of them end up separated by the storm, and Master Higgins wakes up to find out that he does not remember anything. After exploring the island he is on, he finds out that the island is ruled by a king who recently found a girl that also suffers from amnesia and is appointed to become queen. However, she is mysteriously kidnapped and the king requests Higgins to find her. Higgins accepts the mission since he feels that the girl is able to help him recover his lost memories.

== Gameplay ==
Super Adventure Island II puts the player in a world map that is separated in different islands. Each one has various items and equipment, some of which can be used to access other areas on other islands to progress.

On the world map, the player travels by raft on the sea. While on the map and like in some role-playing games, an enemy can randomly attack. This changes the game to a different perspective (in this case, a side-scroller), where the player must defeat the enemies or flee from the area by going to a side of said area.

Once the player accesses an island or some secret area, the game switches to a side-scrolling view. This mode is where the main game takes place.

== Reception ==
Reception

Aggregate score
Aggregator	Score
GameRankings	75.67% (3 reviews)

Review score
Publication	Score
Famitsu	6/10, 5/10, 6/10, 4/10

GamePro stated in their review that "targeted toward younger and first-time adventurers, Super Adventure Island II is light fare for RPG fans. But there's plenty of action for all comers". They commented that the animation is very limited, but that the game's emphasis is on the gameplay, which is solidly excellent. PCMag recommended the game to fans of non-linear levels and character progression, similar to Metroidvania.
