= Case Closed: The Time Bombed Skyscraper =

- Theatrical release poster
- Kanji: 名探偵コナン 時計じかけの摩天楼
- Revised Hepburn: Meitantei Konan: Tokei Jikake no Matenrō
- Directed by: Kenji Kodama
- Written by: Kazunari Kouchi
- Based on: Case Closed by Gosho Aoyama
- Produced by: Michihiko Suwa
- Starring: Minami Takayama; Kappei Yamaguchi; Akira Kamiya; Wakana Yamazaki; Naoko Matsui; Yukiko Iwai; Ikue Ōtani; Wataru Takagi; Kenichi Ogata; Chafurin; Taro Ishida
- Music by: Katsuo Ono
- Production company: TMS-Kyokuichi
- Distributed by: Toho
- Release date: April 19, 1997
- Running time: 94 minutes
- Country: Japan
- Language: Japanese
- Box office: ¥1.1 billion

Case Closed: The Time Bombed Skyscraper, known as Detective Conan: The Time-Bombed Skyscraper (名探偵コナン 時計じかけの摩天楼, Meitantei Konan: Tokei Jikake no Matenrō) in Japan, is a 1997 Japanese animated mystery film directed by Kenji Kodama. It is based on Gosho Aoyama's Case Closed manga series. The film takes place between episodes 54 and 55 of the anime series. Funimation released the film in North America.

== Plot ==
Magnum Cornhouser, a wealthy heart surgeon, is murdered in his own home, bludgeoned with a miniature statue that was left behind. Also at the scene is an unnatural bloodstain on the floor near the body. He left a dying message using his blood to type the keys on his computer's keyboard: JUN. The suspects are Magnum's wife, Mina, his son Mortimer, and housekeeper Manami Goodsbe.

When Richard Moore wrongly accuses Mina on the grounds that "JUN" in Japan is "Minazuki" and Mina was born in June, Conan Edogawa tranquilizes him and uses Richard's voice to explain that the killer snuck up on Magnum and bludgeoned him. The victim turned around and was struck again, causing his hand to brush the keyboard to the ground and accidentally switch it to hiragana. Barely alive, Magnum typed the message "JUN" but when the facts come in play, reads "Ma-Na-Mi" for Manami, revealing her as the killer. As evidence, blood is found on Manami's sock; she removed her footwear to reduce the chance of being caught when she snuck up on Magnum, explaining the unnatural bloodstain found at the crime scene. Manami confesses, stating Magnum was drunk when he performed surgery on her husband Kevin, who died as a result. Manami altered her identity and gave herself a Japanese name knowing Magnum would hire her and today is Kevin's death anniversary. Afterwards, Manami is arrested.

The next day while sorting mail that belonged to his father Booker Kudo at Dr. Agasa's house, Conan finds an invitation addressed to Jimmy from professor Leo Joel, a famous architect. Conan calls Rachel in Jimmy's voice and asks her to go in his place. Rachel agrees, on the condition that Jimmy goes to see a romance movie with her on Saturday at the Beika City Building. She explains how Saturday is May 4th, which is Jimmy's birthday, and she will surprise Jimmy with a red polo shirt when they meet. At the tea party, Joel introduce himself and proposes a small riddle for Richard to solve; it ends up being solved by Conan instead. Joel makes a subtle comment about architecture and the people involved in the field who are only chasing a paycheck.

That morning, Conan receives a call from a mysterious bomber asking for Jimmy, who has recently stolen C-4 explosives and challenges him to a game of cat-and-mouse. Conan accepts the challenge, and the caller gives him clues leading to bombs hidden all over Beika City. Conan finds, intercepts, and destroys all of the bombs, injuring himself in the line of fire while transporting one out of harm's way. He notes that the location of the bombs were or near structures that Joel designed. On one occasion, members of the Junior Detective League received a toy plane which is actually rigged with explosives from the bomber. Amy Yeager remembers the caller having a sweet scent emitting from him, wore a long jacket, had a beard and wore sunglasses but is likely a disguise.

Some of Joel's projects are burned to the ground, including the Cornhouser, Mizushima, Yasuda, and Akutsu households. Joel is interviewed as a precaution. Joseph Meguire recalls a case where Jimmy was called to assist and deduced that a city councilman fatally struck an office worker while under the influence; his son attempted to take the blame instead. The councilman was a supporter for one of Joel's projects. With the councilman arrested, support stopped, but Joel holds no grudges. While transporting a bomb to a safe location, Conan notices the timer has stopped. He backtracks his steps pointing out the park nearby which has English-style gas lights nearby.

After stopping another round of bombs on Yamanote Line, Conan visits Joel once again to investigate, viewing a perfectly symmetrical model project. He notes the similarities between the gas lights near the park and the one in the model. Seeing the connection between the arson and bombings, Conan understands the truth of the matter. Conan calls the authorities via Jimmy's voice and lures them to Joel's gallery where he promptly deduces that Joel to be both the serial bomber and recent arsonist. Having inherited his knowledge from his father, Lionel, Joel exceeded expectations in his field. After gaining fame and fortune from the Yamanote Line Bridge, Joel quietly snapped with a desire to destroy some of his award-winning projects. This is evidenced by his own sentiments how today's generation of architects are only in the field for a paycheck and lack beauty in their work.

The Cornhouser, Mizushima, Yasuda, and Akutsu households, and the Yamanote Line Bridge were all built in classic English styles but were not symmetrical. After stealing C-4 from the plant, Joel sat out and planned to destroy and replace them with symmetrical structures (all of the bomb targets were either at or near buildings he designed). His insanity came after being forced to make drawbacks, either due to customers' preferences, city standards, or neighborhood guidelines. Additionally, Joel challenged Jimmy for his own revenge after Jimmy convicted the councilman for his hit-and-run, who supported his West Tama City redevelopment project, subsequently halting his building plan. Joel stopped the cat carrier bomb as it was near the gas lamps that he designed after the ones from his hometown of London.

To seal Joel for his wrongdoings, Conan reveals the bomber's disguise near his model project, tricking Joel into revealing the real disguise is hidden in his study. He is also responsible for giving the Junior Detective League the toy plane bomb earlier, evidenced by the sweet scent Amy noticed coming from Joel's smoke pipe. Joel attempts to detonate the bombs inside his house, but is stopped when Conan reveals that he removed the batteries earlier. Joel is arrested but taunts the group that he has "one more" place that he wants to destroy, the Beika City Building, which happens to be the venue for Jimmy and Rachel's date. Joel angrily cites that the skyscraper is his least greatest achievement due to the local economy bursting during its construction, selfish taxpayers and drawbacks made because of them, then counts down the time as Richard, Meguire, and Nicholas Santos watch in horror. Conan steals the bomb's blueprints from Joel's coat pocket and sets out on his own to disarm the final bomb.

The bombs cut off the exits and entrances, killing and injuring a number of innocent people, trapping Rachel and more inside. Conan makes his way through the collapsing Beika City Building, but a warped door blocks him off from Rachel. Conan calls Rachel in Jimmy's voice and asks her to look for the bomb which is hidden in a large shopping bag. To disarm the bomb, Conan tells Rachel which wires to cut. Joel has made two extra wires at the last minute, one red, one blue, one of which is booby-trapped and coldly taunts Richard over Rachel's dire situation. He also gave Jimmy 3 extra minutes.

Conan tells Rachel to cut whichever one, having gave up hope and riding on faith. As the rescue team of Tokyo Fire Department arrives and carries him away, Conan realizes that Joel knew that Rachel's favorite color was red and booby-trapped the red one and that the 3 extra minutes were meant for Jimmy to enjoy his birthday. In the last few minutes, Rachel makes a desperate decision and cuts the blue wire because the red wire represents the red string of fate between Jimmy and herself. A celebration ensures and the injured are tended to. Joel, shocked and disgusted that his bomb was successfully disarmed, is finally defeated and arrested for his various crimes.

== Cast ==
Character	Japanese	English
Conan Edogawa	Minami Takayama	Alison Retzloff
Shinichi Kudo/Jimmy Kudo	Kappei Yamaguchi	Jerry Jewell
Ran Mouri/Rachel Moore	Wakana Yamazaki	Colleen Clinkenbeard
Kogoro Mouri/Richard Moore	Akira Kamiya	R. Bruce Elliot
Juzo Megure/Joseph Meguire	Chafurin	Mark Stoddard
Dr. Hiroshi Agasa	Kenichi Ogata	Bill Flynn
Ayumi Yoshida/Amy Yeager	Yukiko Iwai	Monica Rial
Mitsuhiko Tsuburaya/Mitch Tennyson	Ikue Ōtani	Cynthia Cranz
Genta Kojima/George Kaminski	Wataru Takagi	Dameon Clarke
Ninzaburou Shiratori/Nicholas Santos	Kaneto Shiozawa	Eric Vale
Sonoko Suzuki/Serena Sebastian	Naoko Matsui	Laura Bailey
Teiji Moriya/Leo Joel	Tarō Ishida	Kent Williams

== Production ==
For the last scene of the film, an "episode" that original creator Gosho Aoyama wanted to include in the manga was used. He even got to draw the originals himself.

== Music ==
Track	Lyrics by	Composing by	Song by
1. Happy Birthday (theme song)	Shikao Suga	Shikao Suga	Kyoko
2. キミがいれば Kimi ga Ireba (Interlude)	Takayanagi Ren	Katsuo Ōno	Iori
3. 逢いたいよ Aitaiyo (Interlude)	Takayanagi Ren	Katsuo Ōno	Iori

== Release ==
The film was released in 13 theaters in Japan on April 19, 1997. On opening weekend, it grossed ¥8,554,500 ($68,965). It went on to gross a total of ¥1.1 billion in Japan.

== Home media ==
=== VHS ===
The VHS of the film was released on October 19, 1997. Its production was discontinued after switching to DVD in 2006.

=== Region 1 DVD ===
Funimation released the English dub of The Time Bombed Skyscraper on bilingual DVD on October 3, 2006. Unlike the series, the film left the original animation entirely intact with no translations except for the opening title and ending credits. The opening title was replaced with an English version. The original Japanese credits were changed from a tour of Tokyo and recap of the film to a capture of the final shot of the film (an aerial view of the characters and police cars at the crime scene).

=== Region 2 DVD ===
The DVD of the film was released on March 28, 2001. A new DVD was released on February 25, 2011, significantly lowering the original price and added the trailer as a special feature.

=== Blu-ray ===
The Blu-ray version of the film was released on August 26, 2011. The Blu-ray contains the same content as the DVD plus a mini-booklet explaining the film and the BD-live function.

== See also ==
- Die Hard, a 1988 American film with similar premise.
