= Adventure Island II =

1991 video game

- North American cover art
- Developer: Now Production
- Publisher: Hudson Soft
- Designer: J. Koyanagi
- Programmer: Nobuyuki Shinohara
- Artist: Katsuya Jittō
- Composer: Miyoshi Okuyama
- Series: Adventure Island
- Platforms: NES, Game Boy, Gamate
- Release: NES: NA: January 1991; JP: April 26, 1991; EU: July 22, 1992; Game Boy (Adventure Island): NA: February 1992; JP: March 6, 1992; EU: April 23, 1992; Gamate (Kiki Inland): EU: 1992
- Genre: Platform
- Mode: Single-player

Adventure Island II (Note: Known in Japan as Takahashi Meijin no Bōken Jima Tsū (高橋名人の冒険島II; Great Takahashi's Adventure Island II.)) is a 1991 platform game developed by Now Production and published by Hudson Soft for the Nintendo Entertainment System. It is the sequel to Adventure Island and the second game in the series for the NES. While the first game was an adaptation of Sega's Wonder Boy, Adventure Island II is an original work, as were most of the subsequent Adventure Island games. A portable version was also released for the Game Boy in 1992, titled Takahashi Meijin no Bouken Jima II or Adventure Island outside of Japan.

== Plot ==
Master Higgins' girlfriend Tina, has just been kidnapped by the Evil Witch Doctor's persistent followers. Eight islands are in control of the various monster minions, although four friendly dinosaurs will gladly ally themselves with those willing to brave the islands' dangers and defeat their common oppressors. Thinking of how grateful his favorite lady will be when he comes to her rescue, Master Higgins embarks on a daunting quest to get to his honey.

== Gameplay ==
Screenshot of the first level, from the NES version

The rules of the game are the same as those in the original Adventure Island, with the main new feature being the addition of an inventory system. Before the player begins a stage, he can choose which of Higgins' animal friends to bring (if he has rescued any), as well as whether or not he should bring one of the stone hammers he has accumulated. Because of this, the player can no longer upgrade to shooting fireballs when he picks a second hammer. Instead, it gets added as a reserved hammer to the player's inventory.

The checkpoint system has been eliminated and if the player dies in the middle of a stage, he must restart from the very beginning. However, the stages are significantly shorter than in the previous game. When the player strikes a place where a hidden egg is located, it will play a different noise that will serve as an indicator of its location. The bonus zones are now accessed by picking up a key located inside these hidden eggs. Some of these keys will also transport the player to an item room or a shortcut to the next island. There are now underwater stages, as well as vertical-scrolling stages. When the player completes a stage riding a skateboard, he does not get to take it to the next stage like he could in the previous game. When the player completes a stage, he will be asked to choose one of ten spinning eggs that will give him a certain number of points. The player can now backtrack during a stage as well, but only up to a certain point.

The boss of each island awaits the player on a specific stage at the beginning. However, if the player is defeated while fighting a boss, the boss will move to another area, forcing the player not only to clear his current stage, but also another one in order to fight the boss.

There are four types of dinosaur friends that Higgins can ride. These animal friends are summoned when the player collects a playing card suit hidden inside an egg, and they include: A blue camptosaurus (summoned by a heart card) that attacks with its tail and can walk on ice without sliding; a red camptosaurus (spade) that can breathe fire and swim over lava until a certain point; a pteranodon (clover) that can fly over obstacles and drop stones; and an elasmosaurus (diamond), the only dinosaur that can survive in underwater stages (the others will be lost when used underwater) and can help Higgins swim faster.

== Reception ==
Reception

Review scores
Publication	Score
AllGame	3.5/5
Electronic Gaming Monthly	7/10, 7/10, 7/10, 7/10
Famitsu	6/10, 7/10, 7/10, 5/10
GamePro	16/25

Allgame editor Skyler Miller praised the game over the original, specifically its "improved graphics, a map screen, and most importantly, four dinosaur buddies for Master Higgins to ride, each with their own special ability".

== Other media ==
Adventure Island II is one of the video games featuring in the manga titled Cyber Boy, by Nagai Noriaki, Published by Coro Coro Comic and Shogakukan, from 1991 to 1993. Cover artwork for the packaging was illustrated by Shelley L. Hunter.
