= List of Neon Genesis Evangelion video games =

The Neon Genesis Evangelion franchise has spawned a number of tie-in video games. Characters from the series have also made numerous appearances in other titles, such as the Super Robot Wars series by Banpresto.

== PC and console games ==
The following are Evangelion video games that have been released on home and portable consoles, and computer OS.

Title	Details
Neon Genesis EVANGELION (新世紀エヴァンゲリオン, Shinseiki Evangerion)	Platform: Sega Saturn Release date: March 1, 1996 Notes: The first Evangelion video game, released shortly after the TV series' run. The story is set after the episode "Asuka Strikes!", with main character Shinji Ikari badly injured and suffering amnesia as the result of an Angel battle. Having lost his memory, Shinji now has to retrain himself, through sparring with fellow Evangelion pilot Asuka Langley Soryu, eventually defeating the Angel to regain his memories. The game features RPG elements and FMV clips for combat. While most of the animation is original to this title, with the voices of the original Evangelion voice actors reprising their roles, some animated content is recycled from the original TV series.
Neon Genesis Evangelion: 2nd Impression (新世紀エヴァンゲリオン 2nd Impression, Shinseiki Evangerion: 2nd Impression)	Platform: Sega Saturn Release date: March 7, 1997 Notes: A sequel to the previous Neon Genesis EVANGELION for the Sega Saturn, and sees the RPG elements and FMV clips from its predecessor return. This game focuses primarily on Shinji and original character Mayumi Yamagishi, who moves to Tokyo-3 City at the beginning of the story, and is infected with the "Insubstantial Angel" later in the game. The game recreates the structure of an episode of the TV show, and has a number of separate routes for the player to experience. A highly anticipated title, it met with strong sales upon release.
Neon Genesis Evangelion: Girlfriend of Steel (新世紀エヴァンゲリオン鋼鉄のガールフレンド, Shinseiki Evangerion: Kōtetsu no Gārufurendo)	Platform: Sega Saturn, PlayStation, PlayStation 2, PSP, Windows, Macintosh Release date: July 11, 1997 (Original game, Windows); March 30, 2006 (Special Edition, PlayStation 2) Notes: A GAINAX game, set in the time period around Episodes 8 to 13 of the original TV series. It focuses primarily on Shinji and original character Mana Kirishima, a transfer student and pilot of a TRIDENT unit, a rival series to NERV's Evangelion units. The player navigates through the game's map to progress the story, as well as Shinji's possible romantic relationships with Mana and Asuka. The game's remaster, known as the Special Edition, features an additional ending and a number of new scenes.
Neon Genesis Evangelion: Digital Card Library (新世紀エヴァンゲリオン デジタル・カード・ライブラリ, Shinseiki Evangerion: Dejitaru Kaado Raiburari)	Platform: Sega Saturn Release date: September 25, 1997 Notes: Developed by SEGA, the game asks players to clear a number of minigames and quizzes to unlock various promotional art, clips from the show and comics by staff members.
Neon Genesis Evangelion: Collector's Discs (新世紀エヴァンゲリオン コレクターズディスク, Shinseiki Evangerion: Korekutaazu Disuku)	Platform: Windows, Macintosh Release date: February, 1999 (Vol. 1) Notes: A 7-disc series of hybrid CD-ROMs produced by GAINAX. Each disc contains various pieces of Evangelion multimedia, such as wallpapers, screensavers and minigames.
Neon Genesis Evangelion: Eva and Good Friends (新世紀エヴァンゲリオンエヴァと愉快な仲間たち, Shinseiki Evangerion: Eva to Yukaina Nakama-tachi)	Platform: PlayStation, Sega Saturn, Windows, Game Boy Color Release date: July 23, 1998 (Original game, PlayStation); November 19, 1999 (Stripping Instrumentality Project! version, Windows); September 29, 2000 (Mahjong Instrumentality Project version, Game Boy Color) Notes: A mahjong game developed by GAINAX, which also features characters from Nadia: The Secret of Blue Water and Gunbuster. The Evangelion part of the story sees Shinji joining a mahjong tournament and working with the other characters to win it, with the promise that their wishes will be granted if they are victorious. The Windows version of the game, titled Neon Genesis Evangelion: Eva and Good Friends – The Stripping Instrumentality Project! is a port of the PlayStation and Sega Saturn versions, with pornographic "strip mahjong" elements added in. This involves characters taking off items of clothing as the player progresses through the mahjong levels. Two CD-ROM compilation disks that contain these mahjong backgrounds were released under the name of The Stripping Instrumentality Project / Shinji and Good Friends Select, for Windows and Macintosh in 2000. The Game Boy Color version of the game, titled Neon Genesis Evangelion: The Mahjong Instrumentality Project, is also a port of the PlayStation and Sega Saturn versions, however, this edition removes the Nadia and Gunbuster characters from the game.
Shinji and Good Friends (シンジと愉快な仲間たち, Shinji to Yukaina Nakamatachi)	Platform: Windows Release date: February 26, 1999 (Solitaire); May 28, 1999 (Logic); June 4, 1999 (Hanafuda); July 23, 1999 (Daifugō); August 27, 1999 (Buon Giorno); September 24, 1999 (American Page One) Notes: A series of short CD-ROM games featuring several characters from the TV series. Shinji and Good Friends: Is That Solitaire? is a solitaire game featuring 7 different modes. Operation Logic is a nonogram game. Second Hanafuda Impact is based on Japanese Hanafuda playing card games. Daifugō Explosion is similarly based on the Japanese card game, Daifugō. Buon Giorno! Seven in a Row is based on Domino. American Page One is based on One-card.
Neon Genesis Evangelion (新世紀エヴァンゲリオン, Shinseiki Evangerion)	Platform: Nintendo 64 Release date: June 25, 1999 Notes: Released by Bandai, this game covers the major battles throughout the original series as a combat and RPG game. It recycles multiple voice clips and images from the TV show.
Neon Genesis Evangelion: Angel Raising (新世紀エヴァンゲリオン シト育成, Shinseiki Evangerion: Shito Ikusei)	Platform: WonderSwan Release date: July 21, 1999 Notes: Released by Bandai, this game is a virtual pet simulator, and has the player controlling Ryoji Kaji as he raises an Adam fetus over the course of seven in-game days. The player must search NERV headquarters and talk to other characters from the series to acquire different items for the fetus, as well as manage the state of its tank. Depending on what the settings of its tank are, and what items are given to it, the Adam fetus will grow into different things. The potential outcomes of its growth include all of the angels from the show, Eva units, and Pen Pen. The game also has online functionality, allowing two players who own a WonderSwan and a copy of the game to make their Adams fight each other in a mini game.
Neon Genesis Evangelion: Typing-Project E (新世紀エヴァンゲリオン タイピング-E計画, Shinseiki Evangerion: Taipingu-E Keikaku)	Platform: PlayStation 2, Dreamcast, Windows Release date: December 24, 1999 (Windows); April 19, 2001 (Dreamcast); August 2, 2001 (PlayStation 2) Notes: An educational typing training game released by GAINAX. It uses minigames based on events in the original series to teach players how to type, while Maya instructs and encourages the player in between battles.
Neon Genesis Evangelion: Typing Instrumentality Project (新世紀エヴァンゲリオン タイピング補完計画, Shinseiki Evangerion: Taipingu Hokan Keikaku)	Platform: Dreamcast, Windows Release date: July 20, 2000 (Windows); August 30, 2001 (Dreamcast) Notes: A sequel to the previous Typing-Project E and also released by GAINAX, this game features different minigames, while Misato replaces Maya as the character instructing the player on how to type.
Neon Genesis Evangelion: Ayanami Raising Project (新世紀エヴァンゲリオン 綾波育成計画, Shinseiki Evangelion: Ayanami Ikusei Keikaku)	Platform: Dreamcast, PlayStation 2, DS, Windows Release date: May 18, 2001 (Original game, Windows); December 11, 2003 (Asuka Instrumentality Project version, PS2) Notes: Developed by GAINAX and Broccoli, this is a simulation game similar to that of the Princess Maker series. The player character is a NERV official referred to as "The Lieutenant", whose given name is chosen by the player upon starting a new game. He is a young man in his mid twenties, assigned to managing the titular Rei Ayanami's weekly schedule. The game has many possible endings, including potential careers and romantic relationships between Rei and the player, or Rei and Shinji. The PlayStation 2 and DS versions of the game, known as Neon Genesis Evangelion: Ayanami Raising Project with Asuka Instrumentality Project, include an additional route where the Lieutenant looks after Asuka instead of Rei, as well as other new scenes and updated art.
Neon Genesis Evangelion 2 (新世紀エヴァンゲリオン2, Shinseiki Evangerion 2)	Platform: PlayStation 2, PSP Release date: November 20, 2003 (PS2); April 27, 2006 (PSP) Notes: Released by Bandai and developed by Alfa System, this game covers the full story of the original series and The End of Evangelion film, including additional, canonical lore not featured in the show itself. The game sees players going through "Scenarios", separate storylines that focus on different members of the cast of the TV show, while they manage the stats of their player character through life simulation game-style mechanics and engage in conversation with other characters. The PSP version, known as Neon Genesis Evangelion 2: -another cases-, features new stories and some alterations on the gameplay.
Neon Genesis Evangelion: Shinji Ikari Raising Project (新世紀エヴァンゲリオン 碇シンジ育成計画, Shinseiki Evangerion: Ikari Shinji Ikusei Keikaku)	Platform: Windows Release date: September 24, 2004 Notes: Developed by GAINAX, this game sees players taking on the role of Misato Katsuragi to "raise" Shinji, by scheduling him for a number of different daily activities, much like the gameplay in the Ayanami Raising Project game, and the Princess Maker games that preceded it. It features three possible storylines, the first serving as an adaptation of the original show, a second restructuring the plot into a more comedic story, and the third set in an alternate universe similar to the one shown in Episode 26 of the TV series. The game's endings involve Shinji entering different potential futures, careers, or romantic relationships with the other characters. It inspired a manga series of the same name.
Neon Genesis Evangelion: Girlfriend of Steel 2nd (新世紀エヴァンゲリオン鋼鉄のガールフレンド 2nd, Shinseiki Evangerion: Kōtetsu no Gārufurendo 2nd)	Platform: PlayStation 2, PSP, Windows, Macintosh Release date: January 20, 2005 Notes: Officially romanized as Neon Genesis Evangelion: The Iron Maiden 2nd. A GAINAX title, set in the alternate universe shown in Episode 26 of the original TV series. It is primarily a visual novel with dating sim elements, with the player assuming the role of Shinji while he navigates his relationships with Asuka, Rei and Kaworu. The game has no connection to the previous Girlfriend of Steel, despite the name implying it to be a sequel. It inspired the manga series Neon Genesis Evangelion: Angelic Days.
Secret of Evangelion (シークレット オブ エヴァンゲリオン, Shiikuretto obu Evangerion)	Platform: PlayStation 2, Windows, PSP Release date: December 21, 2006 (PS2); June 28, 2007 (PSP, Windows) Notes: A retelling of the events transpiring towards the end of the original series, seen from the point of view of NERV investigator Kenzaki Kyouya, an original character who was a friend of Kaji's in his college days. It also introduces dummy plug research scientist Kaga Hitomi. The game sees Kyouya uncovering the secrets of the NERV organisation's history and purpose, and has a number of different routes that occur based on the player's choices.
Detective Evangelion (名探偵エヴァンゲリオン, Meitantei Evangerion)	Platform: PlayStation 2 Release date: January 18, 2007 Notes: A Broccoli title, featuring an original story in the style of a comedic whodunit murder mystery. In this game, Shinji, controlled by the player, picks up clues on a series of murders and other events from conversation and uses them in Ace Attorney-inspired trial sections. It also involves a variety of different gameplay elements on top of this, including beat 'em up and mecha fights. The original characters from Shinji Ikari Raising Project reappear in this game, alongside the rest of the cast. Two new Evangelion units are also introduced, the Evangelion First-Type and Second-Type. A manga based on the game was serialized in Shōnen Ace, starting in December 2006.
Neon Genesis Evangelion: Battle Orchestra (新世紀エヴァンゲリオン バトルオーケストラ, Shinseiki Evangerion: Batoru Ōkesutora)	Platform: PlayStation 2, PSP Release date: June 28, 2007 (PS2); July 30, 2009 (PSP) Notes: A platform fighter produced by Broccoli, with an original story based loosely on the original series. The game's single player mode has five stories for each character (Shinji, Rei, Asuka, Toji, Kensuke and Kaworu), providing different characters' perspectives on the same scenes and battles in each one. The multiplayer mode features a number of other characters and mecha, including a cameo from Gunbuster, another series by GAINAX and directed by Hideaki Anno.
Petit Eva: EVANGELION@GAME (ぷちえゔぁ EVANGELION@GAME, Puchi Eva: EVANGELION@GAME)	Platform: DS Release date: March 20, 2008 Notes: A spinoff of the Petit Eva parody manga series, developed by Bandai Namco Games. This game features a variety of simple puzzles, and is aimed at younger players. It is notable for being the first piece of Evangelion media to both feature and name Mari Illustrious Makinami, preceding her first canonical appearance, in Evangelion: 2.0 You Can (Not) Advance, by four months.
Evangelion: Jo (ヱヴァンゲリヲン:序, Evangerion: Jo)	Platform: PlayStation 2, PSP Release date: June 4, 2009 Notes: Developed by Bandai Namco Games, this game is based on the movie of the same Japanese name (Evangelion: 1.0 You Are (Not) Alone). It continues the story of the film, loosely following the story of the original television series for the remainder of its play time. It features similar conversation and life simulator gameplay to that of Neon Genesis Evangelion 2, as well as Evangelion mech battles made primarily from quick time events.
Misato Katsuragi's Reporting Plan (葛城ミサト報道計画, Katsuragi Misato Hōdō Keikaku)	Platform: PlayStation 3, PSP Release date: June 6, 2009 Notes: Developed by Cellius, this was a news distribution service that allowed the user to customise a 3D model of Misato, who could then be used to read the daily news. It required users to purchase a separate license for access to the news provided by Japanese newspaper, Mainichi Shimbun. Misato's voice for the daily news reading was generated through a speech synthesis software by the name of Ruby Talk, created by Hitachi. The service was discontinued on June 5, 2010.
Rebuild of Evangelion: -3nd Impact- (ヱヴァンゲリヲン新劇場版-サウンドインパクト-, Evangerion Shin Gekijōban -Saundo Inpakuto-)	Platform: PSP Release date: September 28, 2011 Notes: Developed by Grasshopper, this is a rhythm game that uses Akira Yamaoka's arrangements of music score from the soundtracks of Evangelion: 1.0 You Are (Not) Alone and Evangelion: 2.0 You Can (Not) Advance. It features six different game modes, including some which portray stylised battles between angels and the UN forces, others using clips of Evangelion units fighting angels from the films, and more overlaying sound bites of characters speaking over ambient music. The "3nd" in the title is a Japanese pun on "2nd" (as in Second Impact) and "sound".

=== Pachinko games ===
The following is a list of Evangelion video games that are replications of existing Pachinko slot machines for home console devices. English titles are as provided on the game covers.

Title	Details
Hisshou Pachinko ★ Pachislot Kouryaku Series Vol. 1: CR Neon Genesis Evangelion (必勝パチンコ★パチスロ攻略シリーズ Vol.1 CR新世紀エヴァンゲリオン, Hisshou Pachinko ★ Pachisuro Kouryaku Shiriizu Vol. 1: CR Shinseiki Evangerion)	Platform: PlayStation 2 Release date: October 20, 2005 Notes: Released by D3 Publisher and based on Bisty's CR Evangelion Pachinko machine of the same name.
Hisshou Pachinko ★ Pachislot Kouryaku Series Vol. 5: CR Neon Genesis Evangelion – Second Impact & Pachislot Neon Genesis Evangelion (必勝パチンコ★パチスロ攻略シリーズ Vol.5 CR新世紀エヴァンゲリオン・セカンドインパクト&パチスロ新世紀エヴァンゲリオン, Hisshou Pachinko ★ Pachisuro Kouryaku Shiriizu Vol. 5: CR Shinseiki Evangerion Sekando Inpakuto & Pachisuro Shinseiki Evangerion)	Platform: PlayStation 2 Release date: June 8, 2006 Notes: Released by D3 Publisher and based on Bisty's CR Evangelion Pachinko machines of the same name.
Hisshou Pachinko ★ Pachislot Kouryaku Series Vol. 10: CR Neon Genesis Evangelion ~The Value of a Miracle is...~ (必勝パチンコ★パチスロ攻略シリーズ Vol.10 CR新世紀エヴァンゲリオン 〜奇跡の価値は〜, Hisshou Pachinko ★ Pachisuro Kouryaku Shiriizu Vol. 10: CR Shinseiki Evangerion ~Kiseki no Kachi wa~)	Platform: PlayStation 2 Release date: June 7, 2007 Notes: Released by D3 Publisher and based on Bisty's CR Evangelion Pachinko machine of the same name.
Hisshou Pachinko ★ Pachislot Kouryaku Series Vol. 11: Neon Genesis Evangelion ~I'll Give the True Love for You~ (必勝パチンコ★パチスロ攻略シリーズ Vol.11 新世紀エヴァンゲリオン 〜まごころを、君に〜, Hisshou Pachinko ★ Pachisuro Kouryaku Shiriizu Vol. 11: Shinseiki Evangerion ~Magokoro wo, Kimi ni~)	Platform: PlayStation 2, DS Release date: September 9, 2007 (PlayStation 2); February 21, 2008 (DS) Notes: Released by D3 Publisher and based on Bisty's CR Evangelion Pachinko machine of the same name.
Hisshou Pachinko ★ Pachislot Kouryaku Series Vol. 12: CR Neon Genesis Evangelion ~The Angels are back again~ (必勝パチンコ★パチスロ攻略シリーズ Vol.12 CR新世紀エヴァンゲリオン 〜使徒、再び〜, Hisshou Pachinko ★ Pachisuro Kouryaku Shiriizu Vol. 12: CR Shinseiki Evangerion ~Shito, Futatabi~)	Platform: PlayStation 2, DS Release date: June 26, 2008 (PlayStation 2); June 12, 2008 (DS) Notes: Released by D3 Publisher and based on Bisty's CR Evangelion Pachinko machine of the same name.
Hisshou Pachinko ★ Pachislot Kouryaku Series Vol. 13: Neon Genesis Evangelion ~That time has come, now they're waiting for us~ (必勝パチンコ★パチスロ攻略シリーズ Vol.13 新世紀エヴァンゲリオン 〜約束の時〜, Hisshou Pachinko ★ Pachisuro Kouryaku Shiriizu Vol. 13: Shinseiki Evangerion ~Yakusoku no Toki~)	Platform: PlayStation 2, DS Release date: December 18, 2008 (PlayStation 2); December 4, 2008 (DS) Notes: Released by D3 Publisher and based on Bisty's CR Evangelion Pachinko machine of the same name.
Hisshou Pachinko ★ Pachislot Kouryaku Series Vol. 14: CR Neon Genesis Evangelion ~The Beginning of the End~ (必勝パチンコ★パチスロ攻略シリーズ Vol.14 CR新世紀エヴァンゲリオン 〜最後のシ者〜, Hisshou Pachinko ★ Pachisuro Kouryaku Shiriizu Vol. 14: CR Shinseiki Evangerion ~Saigo no Shisha~)	Platform: PlayStation 2, DS Release date: July 30, 2009 Notes: Released by D3 Publisher and based on Bisty's CR Evangelion Pachinko machine of the same name.
(激アツ!! パチゲー魂 「CRヱヴァンゲリヲン～始まりの福音～」)	Platform: PlayStation 3 Release date: 2010
(激アツ!! パチゲー魂 VOL 2 「ヱヴァンゲリヲン～真実の翼～」)	Platform: PlayStation 3 Release date: 2011
(激アツ!! パチゲー魂MAX ヱヴァンゲリヲン "7" × "生命の鼓動")	Platform: PlayStation 3 Release date: 2012

== Mobile games ==
The following are Evangelion games which have been released for mobile devices.

Title	Details
EVA Card Game (EVAカードゲーム, EVA Kaado Geemu)	Platform: Android Release date: June 8, 2012 Notes: Released by Media Magic, this was a card game simulator that featured characters from the Evangelion franchise. Players could play solitaire, poker and Old Maid.
EVA Slide Puzzle: Operation Angel Annihilation (EVAスライドパズル 使徒殲滅作戦, EVA Suraido Pazuru Shito Senmetsu Sakusen)	Platform: Android, iOS Release date: August 21, 2012 Notes: Released by Media Magic, this was a sliding puzzle game similar to Tetris, where players would line up blocks with the same pattern on them. Doing so would cause the Eva unit they were playing as to give damage to an angel.
Evangelion MEMORIA (ヱヴァンゲリヲン MEMORIA, Evangerion MEMORIA)	Platform: Android, iOS Release date: August 21, 2012 Notes: Released by Taito and COPRO, this was a gacha game available on the Mobage gaming platform. Players assumed the role of a new Evangelion pilot, forming relationships with characters from the Rebuild of Evangelion series, fighting angels and gathering "memories", scenes from the different films. The service was shut down on March 31, 2014.
EVA Arcade Series (EVAアーケードシリーズ, EVA Aakeedo Shiriizu)	Platform: Android, iOS Release date: December 1, 2012 (Jigsaw); August 22, 2013 (Coin Diver); December 17, 2013 (Puzzle Buster); August 22, 2014 (Puzzle Buster: Break) Notes: A series of simple Evangelion games released by Media Magic and Neos. EVA Arcade Series: EVA Jigsaw had the player put together jigsaw puzzles of various shots from the Rebuild of Evangelion films. EVA Arcade Series: Coin Diver was a coin pusher-style game that played clips from the different films, similar to a Pachinko machine. EVA Arcade Series: Puzzle Buster, and its sequel EVA Arcade Series: Puzzle Buster: Break, were tile-matching games that simulated battles with angels from a first person perspective.
Evangelion: Catharsis of the Soul (エヴァンゲリオン 魂のカタルシス, Evangerion Tamashii no Katarushisu)	Platform: Android Release date: March 6, 2014 Notes: Released by DeNA, this was a strategy game similar to Clash of Clans. Players would build cities and strengthen their defenses to fight off invading angels. The service ended on March 31, 2015.
Evangelion Battle Mission (ヱヴァンゲリヲン バトルミッション, Evangerion Batoru Misshon)	Platform: Android, iOS Release date: November 20, 2014 Notes: A gacha game published by Bushimo, in which players could obtain various cards featuring original art of the characters from Rebuild of Evangelion. Gameplay involved drawing a line through connected blocks of the same color to deal damage to enemies. The service was shut down on January 21, 2016.
Yurushito Angel Drop (ゆるしと エンジェルドロップ, Yurushito Enjeeru Doroppu)	Platform: Android, iOS Release date: September 4, 2015 Notes: A match-three RPG released by Media Magic. This game features the angels from the Evangelion franchise as they appear in the merchandise line, "Yurushito".
Evangelion Battlefields (エヴァンゲリオン バトルフィールズ, Evangerion Batorufiiruzu)	Platform: Android, iOS Release date: April 2, 2020 Notes: A player-vs-player battle game released by Mobcast and Takara TOMY Arts, this game was based on the Rebuild of Evangelion films. Players leveled up their characters to fight online against other Evangelion units, and offline against angels. It ran in two month "seasons", with new characters, battles and stories introduced with every season. It also introduced two new characters, Hitomi Amagi, a counselor and NERV operator, and Kotone Suzunami, an Evangelion pilot and internet personality. The game had optional toys-to-life elements. The service ended on July 27, 2023.
