= Project Horned Owl =

1995 light gun shooter video game

Project: Horned Owl
- Developer: Alfa System (Note: Sony Computer Entertainment Japan assisted on development. Cutscenes by Movic.)
- Publisher: Sony Computer Entertainment
- Artist: Masamune Shirow
- Platform: PlayStation
- Release: JP: December 29, 1995; NA: August 9, 1996
- Genre: Light gun shooter
- Modes: Single-player, multiplayer

Project: Horned Owl (Note: Known in Japan as Horned Owl (Japanese: ホーンドアウル, Hepburn: Hōndo Auru).) is a light gun shooter video game developed by Alfa System and published by Sony Computer Entertainment for the PlayStation. Sony’s Japan Studio assisted on development while Movic provided anime cinematics for the game. The game was released in Japan in 1995, and in North America in 1996. It features character designs by manga artist Masamune Shirow. The game was a stylistic predecessor to Elemental Gearbolt, also developed by Alfa System.

== Gameplay and premise ==
Project Horned Owl screenshot.

Project: Horned Owl is an arcade-style rail shooter, with the action taking place in a first-person perspective. The events of the game take place in the somewhat futuristic Metro City, where the player controls one of two Horned Owl Armored Mechanized Unit police officers, Hiro Utsumi or Nash Stolar, as they attempt to take down a terrorist organization known as Metalica. It has the option of utilizing the PlayStation mouse or the Konami light gun. There is a two player co-op as well as single-player mode, both taking place across five city-based levels, where the player controls a giant mech and fights off a variety of mechanized enemies. At the conclusion of each stage there is generally an anime cutscene.

== Reception ==
Reception

Review scores
Publication	Score
AllGame	2/5
Computer and Video Games	58/100
Edge	5/10
Electronic Gaming Monthly	6.5/10, 6/10, 7/10, 7.5/10
EP Daily	7.5/10
Game Informer	5/10
Game Players	6.4/10
GameFan	50/100, 52/100, 50/100; 60/100, 52/100, 52/100
GameSpot	5/10
IGN	6/10
Next Generation	3/5
Play	73%
Dengeki PlayStation	50/100, 75/100, 60/100, 60/100
Game Zero Magazine	30.5/50
PlayStation Plus	68/100
Ultimate Future Games	69%
VideoGames	8/10

According to Famitsu, Project: Horned Owl sold approximately 35,733 copies during its lifetime in Japan. The game received mixed reviews from critics. Next Generation highlighted the futuristic and detailed 3D environments, interactive backgrounds, lengthy missions, and the overwhelming Japanese-style feel, but stated that "the game is pretty average – nothing wrong with it, just not that much to get excited about". Aaron Curtiss for the Los Angeles Times commented that "even though PlayStation went almost a year without a decent shooter, it finally got one it deserves in Project Horned Owl". Bill Hutchens for The News Tribune found that while the game can be played using the standard controller, it was "much more fun when played with a light gun".
