= Yō Kitazawa =

Japanese actor and voice actor (born 1963)

Yō Kitazawa (北沢 洋, Kitazawa Yō; born July 9, 1963) is a Japanese actor and voice actor.

== Voice actor roles ==
=== Anime ===
1995

- Juu Senshi Garukiba
- Linda Cube (Comer)

1996

- Linda Cube Again (Comer)

1998

- Heroine Dream 2 (Hibiki Narutani)
- Serial Experiments Lain (Voice)
- Radiant Silver Gun (Creator)
- If I See You in My Dreams (Whale)

2000

- Sakura Wars (Researcher)

2002

- Overman King Gainer (Kejinan Todd)
- Getbackers (Guard (ep 7))

2003

- Kino no Tabi: The Beautiful World (Man)

2004

- Mars Daybreak (Rim-eyes)

2005

- Kotenkotenko (White Rat)
- Blood+ (Forrest)

2006

- Blood+ Final Piece (Forrest)
- Pumpkin Scissors (Mariel's father)

2008

- Michiko & Hatchin (Nuno)

2010

- Another Century's Episode: R (Kejinan Dad)

2016

- My Hero Academia (Higari Maijima)

2019

- Fairy Tail (Wall Eehto)

=== Video games ===
- Garou: Mark of the Wolves (Kevin Rian, Grant)
- Skylanders: Spyro's Adventure (Dino-Rang and Drill Sergeant)
- Super Robot Wars Z (Kejinan Todd)
- Tatsunoko Fight (Berg Katze)
- Brave Soul
- Linda Cube (George Comer)
- Radiant Silvergun (Creator)

=== Tokusatsu ===
- Kamen Rider Ghost (Denki Ganma)

=== Dubbing ===
==== Live-action ====
- John Leguizamo
  - Collateral Damage (Felix Ramirez)
  - Land of the Dead (Cholo DeMora)
  - The Counselor (Randy)
  - Ride Along (Santiago)
  - Stealing Cars (Montgomery De La Cruz)
  - When They See Us (Raymond Santana Sr.)
  - Playing with Fire (Rodrigo Torres)
- The Assassination of Jesse James by the Coward Robert Ford (Wood Hite (Jeremy Renner))
- The Bounty Hunter (Bobby Jenkins (Dorian Missick))
- The League of Extraordinary Gentlemen (Rodney Skinner (Tony Curran))

==== Animation ====
- CatDog (Dog)
- I Got a Rocket! (Rocket)
