= Asuka Langley Soryu =

Character from Neon Genesis Evangelion

Asuka Langley Sohryu
- Neon Genesis Evangelion character
- Asuka with her Eva-02 (in the background) as a child (left), as a pilot (center) and in civilian clothes (right)
- First appearance: Neon Genesis Evangelion episode 8: "Asuka Strikes!" (1995)
- Created by: Gainax (collectively)
- Voiced by: Japanese: Yūko Miyamura; English: Tiffany Grant (ADV Films dub, Rebuild); Stephanie McKeon (Netflix dub)

In-universe information
- Full name: Asuka Langley Soryu (Original); Asuka Shikinami Langley (Rebuild)
- Gender: Female
- Title(s): Second Child; Captain (Rebuild)
- Relatives: Kyoko Zeppelin Soryu (mother); Ryoji Kaji (guardian); Misato Katsuragi (guardian)
- Nationality: American

Asuka Langley Soryu (Japanese: 惣流・アスカ・ラングレー, Hepburn: Sōryū Asuka Rangurē; IPA: [soːɾʲɯː asɯ̥ka ɾaŋɡɯɾeː]) (Note: Her surname is romanized as Soryu in the English manga and Sohryu in the English version of the television series, the English version of the film, and on Gainax's website.) is a fictional character from the Neon Genesis Evangelion franchise created by animation studio Gainax. She first appears in the original anime series, and also appears in the franchise's animated feature films and related media, including video games, the Rebuild of Evangelion films, and the manga adaptation by Yoshiyuki Sadamoto. In Japanese, Yūko Miyamura voices Asuka in all her animated appearances and merchandise. In English, Tiffany Grant voices her in the ADV Films dub and Stephanie McKeon voices her in the Netflix dub.

Within the franchise, Asuka is designated as the Second Child and the fiery pilot of a giant mecha named Evangelion Unit-02 to fight against enemies known as Angels for the special agency Nerv. Because of childhood trauma, she has developed a competitive and outgoing character to get noticed by other people and affirm her own self. In the Rebuild of Evangelion films, her Japanese surname is changed to Shikinami (式波; IPA: [ɕi̥kʲinamʲi]) and she differs significantly in her background and characterization from her television series incarnation.

Series creator and director Hideaki Anno originally proposed an Asuka-like girl as the main protagonist of the series. Character designer Yoshiyuki Sadamoto asked Anno to include a male main character instead, downgrading her to the role of co-protagonist with Shinji Ikari. Anno based her psychology on his personality, bringing his moods into the character, acting instinctively and without having thought about how the character would evolve. During the first broadcast of the series, he changed his plans, creating an evolutionary parable in which Asuka becomes more dramatic and suffers, intentionally going against the expectations of the fans. The Japanese voice actress Miyamura was also influential, deciding some details and some of Asuka's lines.

Asuka maintained a high ranking in the series' popularity polls and has appeared in surveys to decide the most popular anime characters in Japan. Merchandising based on her has also been released, particularly action figures, which became highly popular. Some critics took issue with her hubris and her personality, judging these as tiresome and arrogant; others appreciated her realism and complex psychological introspection. Asuka is also one of the most successful and influential examples of the tsundere stereotype, characteristic of grumpy and arrogant characters with a fragile hidden side, helping to define its characteristics.

== Conception ==
Early designs for Asuka by mangaka Yoshiyuki Sadamoto, first published in 1993

In the early design stages of the Neon Genesis Evangelion anime, creator and director Hideaki Anno proposed including a girl similar to Asuka as the protagonist. Character designer Yoshiyuki Sadamoto proved reluctant to accept the idea of a female character in the lead role after Gainax's previous works like Gunbuster and Nadia: The Secret of Blue Water; he said: "A robot should be piloted by a trained person, whether it is a woman or not makes no difference, but I cannot understand why a girl should pilot a robot". He thus asked the director to use a boy in the role of main character, downgrading Asuka to the role of female co-protagonist. Sadamoto modeled the relationship between her and the male protagonist Shinji Ikari taking inspiration from Nadia and Jean from The Secret of Blue Water. Asuka should have represented "[Shinji's] desire for the female sex", as opposed to Rei Ayanami's "motherhood", and should have been the idol of Neon Genesis Evangelion. Anno thought of her as Nadia La Arwal from The Secret of Blue Water with a different hairstyle. Early character sketches also depicted Asuka with shorter hair. In the initial project, Asuka was described as "a determined girl" who adapts to the situation in which she finds herself, passionate about video games and "aspires to become like Ryoji Kaji". In the nineteenth episode, she would have had to be seriously injured in her attempt to protect Shinji, who would have thus "proved his worth" trying to save her.

For the character's name, Anno took inspiration from Asuka Saki (砂姫 明日香, Saki Asuka), the protagonist of the manga Super Girl Asuka (超少女明日香, Chō Shōjo Asuka), written by Shinji Wada; for the surname, he merged the names of two ships used in the Second World War, the Japanese World War II aircraft carrier Soryu and the American aircraft carrier Langley. Despite her multi-ethnic origins, the staff made Asuka's skin the same color as that of Rei Ayanami. For the German language terms used in the scenes with Asuka, staff asked for help from an American employee of Gainax, Michael House, who exploited his basic knowledge of the language, acquired in high school, and a Japanese-German dictionary from a local library. According to Anime News Network's May Callum, Gainax did not pay attention to the dialogue's German grammar, believing the series would never be successful enough to be watched by native German speakers.

For Asuka's psychology, Anno relied on his personality, as with the other characters in the series. Staff originally inserted her after the first six episodes to lighten the tone of the series. She was presented with an exhilarating personality without foreshadowing her eventual depressing moments in the latter half. Anno said that he didn't intend to go "that far" at first and that he didn't completely grasp the character of Asuka until he made her "Are you stupid?" (あんたバカ?, Anta baka?) catchphrase, with which the character was definitively born. During the series's first airing, the director began to criticize otaku, Japanese obsessed animation fans, accusing them of being excessively closed and introverted; therefore, he changed the atmosphere of the second half of the series, making the plot darker, violent, and introspective. Asuka's story reflected the changes: although she had been introduced in an essentially positive role, her character became increasingly dramatic and introverted, going against the expectations and the pleasure principle of anime fans. In the twenty-second episode, "Don't Be", Anno focused on Asuka's emotional situation, harassed by her first menstrual cycle, a theme already presented in Gunbuster, but not considering himself capable of exploring such a feminine theme, he condensed everything into a single scene.

Animator Mitsuo Iso, who also wrote "Lilliputian Hitcher", contributed several ideas during the series' production. In one of his early drafts, Asuka's father appeared alongside Gendo Ikari. Iso's ending instead had Asuka lead the defense of Nerv against a nuclear attack alongside a mysterious one-eyed man, later revealed to be Kaji, who had been presumed dead. She then attempted a kamikaze attack to protect him, helped Shinji and Misato escape, and ultimately reconciled with Rei. Miyamura's interpretation was also important for Asuka's characterization. During the production of the last episodes Anno inserted scenes in which staff represented Asuka with simple hand-drawn sketches, remaining satisfied with the result, saying: "After having drawn Asuka with a marker, as soon as Yuko Miyamura gave it her voice, it was more Asuka than ever". Furthermore, the author's original intent was to insert a long live-action segment for the film The End of Evangelion (1997) centered on the character. The original segment focused on a normal day of Asuka, who would wake up in an apartment after drinking and spend the night with Toji Suzuhara, with whom she would embark on a sexual and sentimental relationship. Misato Katsuragi would have been the roommate in the apartment next to her; Rei Ayanami would have been her colleague and her senpai. In the live-action alternative universe, Shinji would never have existed; walking the streets of Tokyo-2, however, Asuka would hear his voice calling her.

=== Voice ===
==== Neon Genesis Evangelion ====
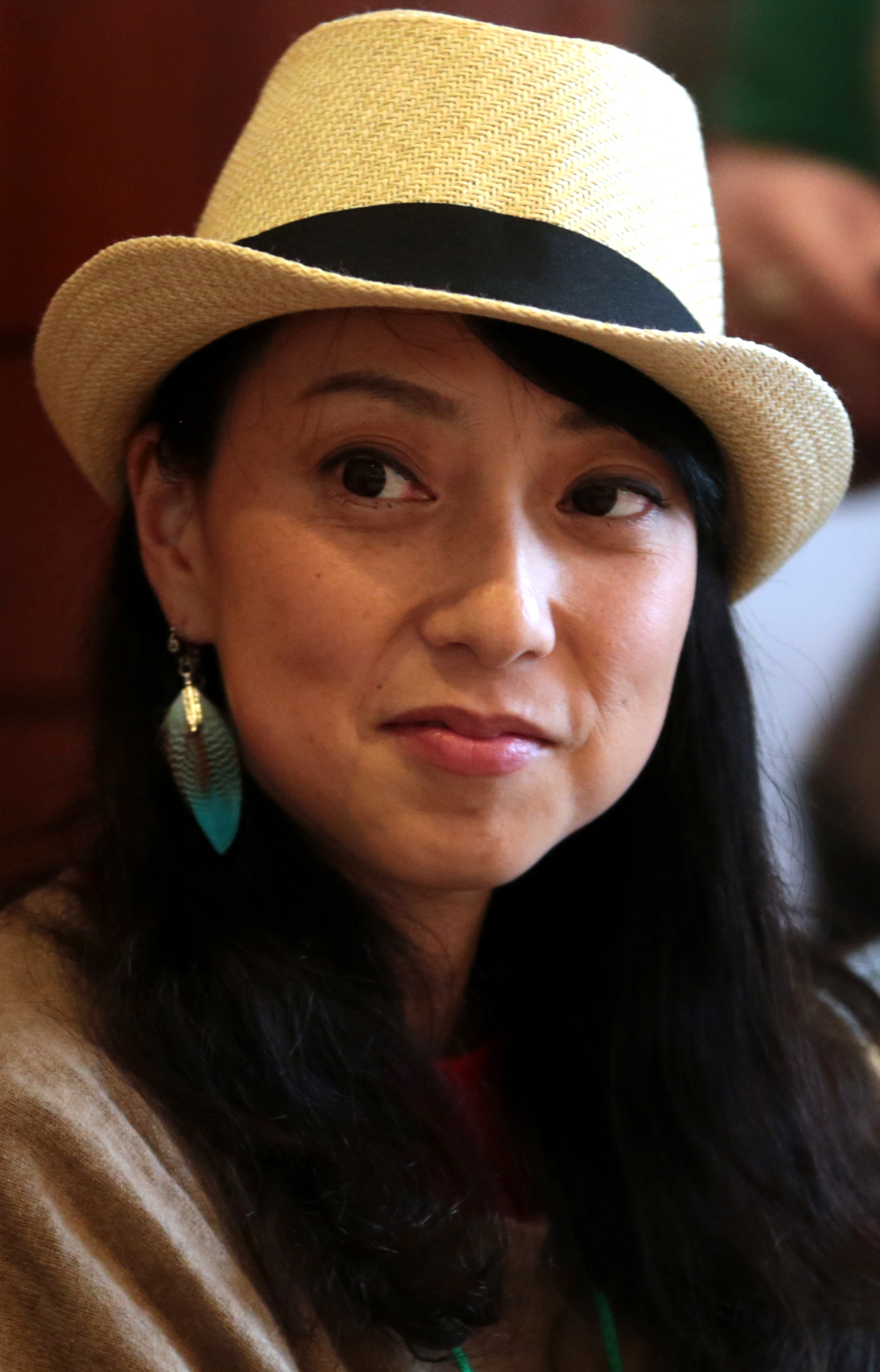
"Asuka wasn't the most open-hearted character I've met. When I act Asuka's part, I try to synchronize myself with her 400%. But every time I tried to draw myself in closer synchronization, Asuka would never allow herself to synch with me. Even in the end, she would never step across the line and draw closer to me. One day, I figured out that there was a wall in Asuka's heart." –Yūko Miyamura

Yūko Miyamura voices Asuka's character in all her appearances in the original series, and the later films, spin-offs, video games, and the Rebuild of Evangelion film series. The only exception is an introspective scene from the twenty-second episode, when other female members of the cast replace the character's voice during a metaphysical sequence. Miyamura had originally auditioned for the role of Rei, but staff felt her voice was too energetic, so she was offered Asuka instead. According to Miyamura, Asuka's dubbing proved difficult. She said she wished to "erase Evangelion" and forget her experience with it. Towards the end of the first broadcast, Miyamura suffered from bulimia and found herself in a disastrous psychic state, similar to that of Asuka's character. After the release of the movie The End of Evangelion (1997) she said, "I think I had a kamikaze feeling during the voice-over". The voice actress identified herself so much with the character she took a conversation course in German, decided some of the character's lines, and Asuka's details, such as the cloth puppet in the shape of a monkey featured in her childhood flashbacks. One of her ideas was the German sentences Asuka utters in the twenty-second episode of the series in a telephone conversation with her stepmother.

When dubbing the last scene of The End of Evangelion, in which Shinji strangles Asuka, Shinji's voice actress Megumi Ogata physically imitated his gesture and strangled her colleague. Because of her agitation, Ogata squeezed her neck too hard, risking having her not properly recite the rest of the film's lines. With Ogata's gesture, Miyamura could finally produce realistic sounds of strangulation and thanked her colleague for her availability. Anno based the scene on an incident that happened to one of his female friends. She was strangled by a malicious man, but when she was about to be killed, she stroked him for no reason. When the man stopped squeezing her neck, the woman regained a cold attitude, speaking the words that Asuka would have said to Shinji in the original script: "I can't stand the idea of being killed by someone like you" (あんたなんかに殺されるのは真っ平よ). Dissatisfied with Miyamura's interpretation of the original last line, Anno asked her to imagine a stranger sneaking into her room, who could rape her at any time, but who prefers to masturbate by watching her sleep. The director asked her what she would say about this if she woke up suddenly, noticing what had happened. Miyamura, disgusted by the scene, replied saying "Kimochi warui" (気持ち 悪い; "How disgusting" or "I feel sick"). After the conversation, Anno changed the line by echoing the voice actress's reaction.

==== Rebuild of Evangelion saga ====
Further difficulties arose during the dubbing sessions for the film Evangelion: 3.0 You Can (Not) Redo (2012), the third installment of the Rebuild saga, set fourteen years after the previous movies. According to Miyamura, the scenario gave her "very confused feelings" and "a constant feeling of light-headedness". Hideaki Anno did not explain the plot and setting of the film to her, complicating her work. At the beginning, however, she didn't want to go back to dubbing the Rebuild and she was scared, given the suffering caused by The End of Evangelion. After finishing the final film of the saga, Evangelion: 3.0+1.0 Thrice Upon a Time (2021), Miyamura stated: "I felt like a mother to Asuka at times. I cannot watch End of Evangelion even now because it's too painful." Recording for Thrice Upon a Time was less stressful, but also taxing due to the many delays and revisions in production. At the end of the recording, Anno thanked her for playing the role of Asuka for twenty-five years; Miyamura furthermore noted Anno and Kazuya Tsurumaki orientated her far more than before.

During the recording of the feature film, she had to dub a scene in which Asuka screams in pain as she pulls an anti-Angel seal from her eye. When she recorded, the drawings for the sequence had not yet been completed, so she imagined the scenes involved, listening to the director's explanations and trying to do her best to feel the required sensations. Screaming, she tried to use all her imagination and pretended to stab herself, as if flesh were being torn from her. The support of Megumi Ogata, Shinji's voice actress who was already used to screaming in other Evangelion scenes, also helped her in the process. The last thing asked of her was to write the character's full name in cursive herself to be used in the film. She had lived in Australia for the past two decades, but was still unsure of how to write "Langley". Miyamura also played Soryu and Shikinami as two different people, but both with a strong desire to be better. Before the COVID-19 pandemic, her sessions were already finished; later, some points were resumed and re-recorded, so there was no precise prediction as to when the work would be finished. She still had difficulties in understanding the story, and had taken the habit of reading fan-made analysis to help herself.

==== English dub ====
Asuka is voiced by Tiffany Grant in English in the ADV films dub, and Stephanie McKeon in the Netflix dub. Grant felt playing Asuka was "refreshing", as "she says the most horrible things to people, things that you'd like to say to people and can't get away with". Grant stated she greatly identified with the character, to the point of Asuka becoming a part of her: "She's kinda like my kid sister, which is why I feel the need to stick up for her". She also met Miyamura in conventions in the early 2000s and, discussing their experiences portraying Asuka, Miyamura rekindled their shared love and concern for the character's happiness.

== Appearances ==
=== Neon Genesis Evangelion ===
Asuka Langley Soryu was born on December 4, 2001. She is the daughter of Dr. Soryu Kyoko Zeppelin, an employee of a research center named Gehirn. She is of Japanese and German descent and has U.S. citizenship. In 2005 her mother participates in a contact experiment with the mecha Evangelion Unit 02, but, because of an accident, she suffers a severe mental breakdown, becoming permanently hospitalized. These injuries render her unable to recognize her child. Asuka is deeply hurt by her mother's behavior, who speaks to a doll believing it to be her daughter. After some time, Asuka is chosen as the Second Child and Eva-02's official pilot. Hoping that her selection could lead her mother to pay attention to her again, she excitedly runs to her room to announce the news, finding her mother's corpse hanging from the ceiling. Shocked and traumatized by her mother's suicide, Asuka adopts self-affirmation as the only reason to be, participating in training sessions to become a pilot and meet other people's expectations.

Her custody is assigned to Ryoji Kaji, towards whom she is infatuated. In 2015, after graduating from a German university, Asuka leaves there, accompanied by Kaji and Unit 02, on board a United Nations aircraft carrier escorted by numerous warships to protect the Eva. During the trip, she meets Shinji Ikari, Third Child and pilot of Unit 01, and her new classmates Toji and Kensuke. The United Nations fleet is then attacked by Gaghiel, the sixth Angel. Recognizing this event as a good chance to demonstrate her skills, Asuka independently activates her Eva, coercing Shinji into joining her in the cockpit. Despite struggling to work together, and the Eva not yet being equipped to operate underwater, the two children destroy the enemy. She is later placed in class 2-A of Tokyo-3 first municipal middle school, living with Shinji under Misato Katsuragi's care. She teases Shinji continuously about his passivity and perceived lack of manliness, but gradually comes to respect and like him as they fight Angels together. She is rarely able to express these feelings. However, following a series of Angel battles where Shinji outperforms her, she grows increasingly unable to continue to suppress her traumatized psyche, drastically lowering her pilot skills. This comes to a head when the Angel Arael attacks; Asuka, burdened by her continually worsening performance in tests, tries to attack the Angel alone, but is overwhelmed by the Angel's attack, a beam that penetrates her mental barrier and forces her to relive her darkest memories.

In the battle with the next Angel, Armisael, she cannot activate the Evangelion. As a result of this, Asuka loses all will to live, runs away and goes to the home of her friend Hikari Horaki, spending time aimlessly roaming the streets of Tokyo-3. She is eventually found by Nerv personnel, naked and starving in the bathtub of a ruined building. The main series ends with her lying in a hospital bed in a catatonic state.

=== The End of Evangelion ===
In the movie The End of Evangelion (1997), as the Japanese Strategic Self-Defense Force invades Nerv headquarters, Asuka is placed inside Unit 02, which is then submerged in a lake for her protection. As she is bombarded by depth charges, Asuka wakes up, declares she does not want to die, and, in a moment of clarity, feels her mother within the Eva. Her self-identity regained, she emerges and defeats the Self-Defence Force, before encountering nine mechas named Mass-Production Evas. Though she successfully disables all nine opponents, Eva-02's power runs out; the power of the mass-produced Evas allows them to eviscerate and dismember Unit 02.

Seeing Asuka's destroyed Evangelion makes Shinji go into a frenzy, which eventually culminates in him starting a catastrophic event named the Third Impact. Shinji and Asuka have an extended dream-like sequence inside Instrumentality, a process in which the soul of humanity merges into one collective consciousness. Shinji claims he wants to understand her, but she refuses. He is furious at her rejection and lashes out by choking her. At the end of the process, Shinji rejects Instrumentality, and she returns after him in a new world on a post-apocalyptic shore surrounded by a red sea. In the film's final scene, Shinji begins strangling Asuka, but stops when she caresses his face. Shinji breaks down crying, and the film ends with Asuka looking down on Shinji as he cries into her chest and saying "How disgusting", before cutting to black.

=== Rebuild of Evangelion ===
In the Rebuild of Evangelion saga, Asuka appears first in the second film, Evangelion: 2.0 You Can (Not) Advance (2009). Changes have been made to her character, such as her family name being changed from Sōryū (惣流) to Shikinami (式波), continuing the Japanese maritime vessel naming convention. The name change resulted from a precise choice by Hideaki Anno, who said he had changed the background of the character. Asuka Shikinami Langley, compared to her original counterpart, seems more open and vulnerable. Near the end of the film, for example, she confides in someone for the first time talking genuinely about her feelings with Misato. She does not feel infatuated with Ryoji Kaji and maintains a more affectionate and peaceful relationship with Shinji. She also keeps her distance from others, often isolating herself to play video games. Although she publicly rejects others, she becomes possessive of Shinji, feeling jealous of him and taking an interest in his feelings.

During the production phase, screenwriter Yōji Enokido added a night scene in which Asuka, feeling alone, enters her colleague's room without permission, sleeping next to him. In the course of events, she also plays video games and tries to cook something for Shinji. She is a captain of the European Air Force, faces the seventh Angel with her Eva-02, and is designated pilot of the Eva-03, whereas in the original series this Eva was piloted by Toji. Unit 03 is later contaminated by a parasitic-type Angel, Bardiel, and collides with Eva-01; Asuka survives, but is last seen in urgent care.

In Evangelion: 3.0 You Can (Not) Redo (2012), Asuka is initially part of the rescue operation for Eva-01, which is stranded in space, working together with Mari for an organization named Wille, which is dedicated to destroying Nerv. Convinced by Mari, she dons her old plugsuit in an attempt to get Shinji to recognize them. (Note: As depicted in the Evangelion: 3.0 (-120min.) prequel manga) After fighting off an initial attack by Nerv, Asuka confronts Shinji in his holding cell and tells him fourteen years have passed. Asuka is chronologically twenty-eight years old, but has not physically aged due to what she calls the "curse of Eva"; she also wears an eyepatch that glows blue. Asuka, again supported by Mari, confronts Shinji and his co-pilot Kaworu Nagisa and eventually self-destructs her Eva during the fight. After the fight, she grabs Shinji's wrist, and they move along the ruins of Tokyo-3, followed by Rei Ayanami.

==== Evangelion: 3.0+1.0 ====
In the final film, Evangelion: 3.0+1.0 Thrice Upon a Time, Asuka guides Shinji and Rei before being picked up by Kensuke Aida. She lives in a place named Village-3 in Kensuke's house. She feels she is no longer human as a result of the changes to her body and lack of aging, growing indifferent to her well-being. In the course of the feature film she goes to check on Shinji's distraught and almost catatonic state in silence; Miyamura described hers as the attitude of a mother "who quietly leaves food in front of her son's room to see how he is doing when he is locked up in his room". Shikinami eventually forces Shinji, completely helpless and no longer wanting to continue living, to eat by forcibly stuffing food into his mouth. Scholar Satoshi Tsukamoto observed that Asuka scolds Shinji "as an elder sister".

When Wille's ship AAA Wunder arrives to pick up Asuka, Shinji insists on going with her. During the final battle in Antarctica Asuka is forced to take off her eyepatch, releasing the ninth Angel contained within. She converts Eva-02 to a new form, but is absorbed by Eva-13. Inside, Asuka meets the original member of the Shikinami clone series she's a part of. Asuka is shown to have fought the other clones as a child before being selected as a pilot. Lamenting not having anyone to take care of her, Kensuke appears, dressed as her stuffed doll, and reassures her. Asuka is then present in an adult body, and Shinji thanks her for saying she liked him, and tells her he liked her as well, before he and Mari bid her farewell. In the final scene of the film, she is last seen on a train platform in a rebuilt world.

During 3.0+1.0, Asuka confesses her feelings to Shinji by saying that she liked him; for Miyamura, the sentence would not imply that her love is over or that she now loves someone else, "but that she genuinely wanted to tell him that". The actress also emphasized during the interviews that she did not interpret Kensuke and Asuka's relationship as romantic, as Shikinami is still physically fourteen years old; according to her, Kensuke would only be a sort of parental reference figure, and even Anno said that the character's last scene in Thrice Upon A Time is related to the image of Kensuke as a father figure for Shikinami. According to her, "Kensuke is a warmth for those who are lonely or want to feel safe". During production, a scene in which Kensuke shoots Asuka with a camera was thought to be a love scene; however, the voice actress also interpreted this love as paternal. Tetsuya Iwanaga, Japanese interpreter of Kensuke, described his character as "a friend she's never quite been able to get rid of ever since middle school". In an interview, Iwanaga stated that he interpreted the scene in which Kensuke is seen disguised as Asuka's rag doll as a representation of him becoming "the prop that rescued Asuka". Miyamura also voiced a scene in which Asuka says "baka Shinji?" as a "love letter" to everyone who supported the couple.

=== In other media ===
In the Neon Genesis Evangelion manga, illustrated and written by Yoshiyuki Sadamoto, Asuka has a more immature character than her animated counterpart and her story is different; despite having a similar, familiar past, in the manga she was conceived through artificial fertilization, as the result of an experiment in eugenics. In her first actual battle against Gaghiel, whom she confronts alongside Shinji in the same Evangelion unit in the classic series, she fights alone, while Shinji later watches the recorded fight on a projector. In the next battle, Asuka and Shinji fight, as in the classic series, against Angel Israfel together; Sadamoto conceived their dance training as akin to a "kiss", underlining their psychological connection. Kotaku also noticed how much of their relationship is "absent", while she remains fixated on Kaji. In the comic her fellow pilot Kaworu Nagisa is also introduced before and interacts with her, immediately arousing her antipathy. Further differences are presented in the last chapters of the manga, corresponding to the events of the movie The End of Evangelion. In the feature film, the Eva-02 is dismembered by the Eva Series before Shinji's arrival, while in the comic the Third Child intervenes in battle in her defense. In the final chapter of the comic, following the failure of Instrumentality, Shinji lives in a world where it snows again in Japan and where people do not seem to have any memory of recent events. The Third Child, traveling on a train to his new school, meets a girl similar to Asuka. According to Sadamoto, the Asuka-like girl is not concretely Asuka, but the symbol "of an attractive woman that Shinji can meet in the new world".

In a scene from the last episode of the animated series, an alternate reality is presented with a completely different story than in the previous installments, where Asuka is a normal middle school student and a childhood friend of Shinji Ikari, the Evangelion units never existed, and Asuka did not experience any childhood trauma regarding her mother Kyōko. A similar version of events can be found in Neon Genesis Evangelion: Angelic Days, and the parody series Petit Eva: Evangelion@School, where she behaves like a sister towards Shinji. In Neon Genesis Evangelion: Campus Apocalypse, Asuka is a foreign exchange student, and uses a whip in battle. She is also present in Neon Genesis Evangelion: Legend of the Piko Piko Middle School Students. The simulation game Neon Genesis Evangelion: Ayanami Raising Project includes an expansion in its PlayStation 2 version that allows the player to take on the role of Asuka's guardian instead of Rei's. She is also available as a romantic option in Neon Genesis Evangelion: Girlfriend of Steel 2nd, Neon Genesis Evangelion 2, Neon Genesis Evangelion: Shinji Ikari Raising Project and its manga adaptation. In Neon Genesis Evangelion: Anima, Asuka is older, more stable and mature, having developed a strong friendship with Shinji and even Rei. Asuka also merges with her Eva unit turning into a hybrid named Crimson A1.

She also appears in the crossover Transformers x Evangelion, in the video games based on the original animated series and media not related to the Evangelion franchise, including Honkai Impact 3rd, Monster Strike, Super Robot Wars, Tales of Zestiria, Puzzle & Dragons, Keri Hime Sweets, Summons Board, Puyopuyo!! Quest, The First Descendant, and in an official Shinkansen Henkei Robo Shinkalion cross-over episode. In the Super Robot Wars franchise, she butts heads with Kouji Kabuto, the pilot of Mazinger Z and Mazinkaiser. It is also implied that she developed crushes on famous heroes such as Char Aznable and Amuro Ray, but proves jealous of Shinji, who crushes for Lynn Minmay of the Macross franchise. In 2026 a new series based on Neon Genesis Evangelion has been announced, with game designer Yoko Taro as main writer; after the announcement, Stellar Blade director Hyung-Tae Kim created an illustration of Asuka surrounded by masks of Emil, a character from Yoko Taro's game Nier, asking Yoko Taro to handle her character well. This artwork proved to be controversial for relying on artificial intelligence, with Nier: Automata designer commenting, "This is the first time I've seen something I created clearly incorporated into a generative AI. The peepholes and paint quirks remain exactly as they were." Asuka is set to appear as a playable character via downloadable content in Sonic Racing: CrossWorlds.

== Characterization ==
At first glance obviously she comes across rather brash and pushy and loud, and I understand that, but the more you get to know her the more you come across her motivations behind this, and you always have to keep in mind that she's still only fourteen, so no matter how terribly educated or clever she might be she's only a fourteen-year-old girl. So I think in the end her heart is in the right place but she has a hard time communicating that with her emotions and everything, how she really feels. I mean, she wants to have friends and she wants to be liked.

— Tiffany Grant

Asuka is an energetic, proud and enterprising girl with a brave and resolute character. She tends to look down on other people and wants to be constantly at the center of attention. Although she normally shows a stubborn and exuberant attitude, in some moments she exhibits a kinder, more sensitive and caring side. Her abrupt and impulsive ways often arouse other people's antipathy, since they do not fully understand her real intentions. Unlike fellow pilots Shinji and Rei, she is extremely proud to be a pilot and engages in missions with great enthusiasm, but despite her apparently strong, aggressive and competitive character, Asuka suffers from the same sense of alienation as her companions. According to critic Vrai Kaiser, Asuka experienced the same trauma as Shinji, but responded by becoming "showy and brashly independent". Scholar Gabriel F. Y. Tsang argued both Shinji and Asuka "repeatedly memorized their sudden loss of mother that leads to their nihilistic feeling and cynical attitude about existing at the present moment". Her desire to prove herself often leads to her rushing into battles unprepared and ending up defeated. She also wants to be recognized by others through her role as a pilot and has been described as a perfectionist.

Her ostentatious competitiveness originates from her childhood experiences, marked by the mental illness and the suicide of her mother, Kyōko. Asuka faced her loss by immersing herself in pride, becoming indisposed to any kind of help or advice and adopting strength and self-affirmation as her only raison d'être. Tormented "by the fear of not being necessary", she pilots Unit-02 only to satisfy her intimate desire for acceptance, longing to be considered "an elite pilot who will protect humanity". Her excessive self-confidence leads her to clash with Shinji, gradually losing self-confidence and becoming psychologically and physically compromised. The Fourth Child's selection, Toji Suzuhara, also contributes to the destruction of her pride. After she learns of Kaji's death, she questions the meaning of her life and her identity, avoiding any kind of human contact and never meeting the gaze of other people. Asuka's relationship with Rei Ayanami is also conflictual. She despises Rei, calling her "Miss Perfect" (優等生, yūtōsei; literally "honor student") and "mechanical puppet girl". In a scene from the twenty-second episode, Rei states that she is ready to die for Commander Gendō Ikari, provoking Asuka's anger, who slaps her and says she has hated her from the moment they met. Shortly thereafter, Rei helps her during the fight against Arael, an act that destroys her already wounded pride.

Asuka's excessive pride prevents her from admitting—even to herself—that she feels something for male protagonist Shinji. This leads her to attack Shinji's virility continuously, directing both interest and open hostility towards him. As events and battles unfold, her feelings of love and hate intensify and dominate her. She kisses Shinji in the fifteenth episode, (Note: "Why does Asuka want to kiss Shinji? Even assuming she was spiteful of Kaji, one doesn't understand the real underlying motive. After the kiss, Asuka states: "I did it just to kill time." She yells, as if to make Shinji perceive it and to confirm it to herself, as if she wants to hide some embarrassment" (Neon Genesis Evangelion Film Book (in Japanese). Vol. 5. Kadokawa Shoten. pp. 44–45.).) but when he beats her in pilot tests, she develops an inferiority complex towards him. Because of their intimate fragility and insecurities, Shinji and Asuka are unable to communicate effectively with one another on an emotional level, despite their mutual latent interest. According to Newtype magazine, Shinji has feelings for her, while Asuka openly states her feeling of being frustrated with wanting him as her partner, so "her feelings for him as a man are less than they appear to be". According to critic Susan J. Napier, they might be expected to develop a romantic attraction for each other, but their sexual tension is subsumed under Asuka's intense competitiveness; Napier also noted that Shinji feels fear and attraction towards the maternal figures of the women around him, such as Rei or Misato, but only Asuka "is allowed to seem explicitly sexual". In one scene from The End of Evangelion movie, Asuka is seen on a bed while she speaks with an angry expression, interpreted by writers Kazuhisa Fujie and Martin Foster as a representation of Shinji's libido. Asuka is framed while she has sexual intercourse with her partner, in a position described by an official artbook as "of the cowgirl". According to an official card game, moreover, neither Yui, nor Rei and nor Misato could be a woman for Shinji, while Asuka, the only girl equal to him, becomes the center of his desire. Shinji however uses her as an object to console himself and ends up hurting her. Despite this, in the last scene Shinji meets Asuka in the new world after the failure of Instrumentality, just as he had wished.

=== Psychoanalysis and themes ===
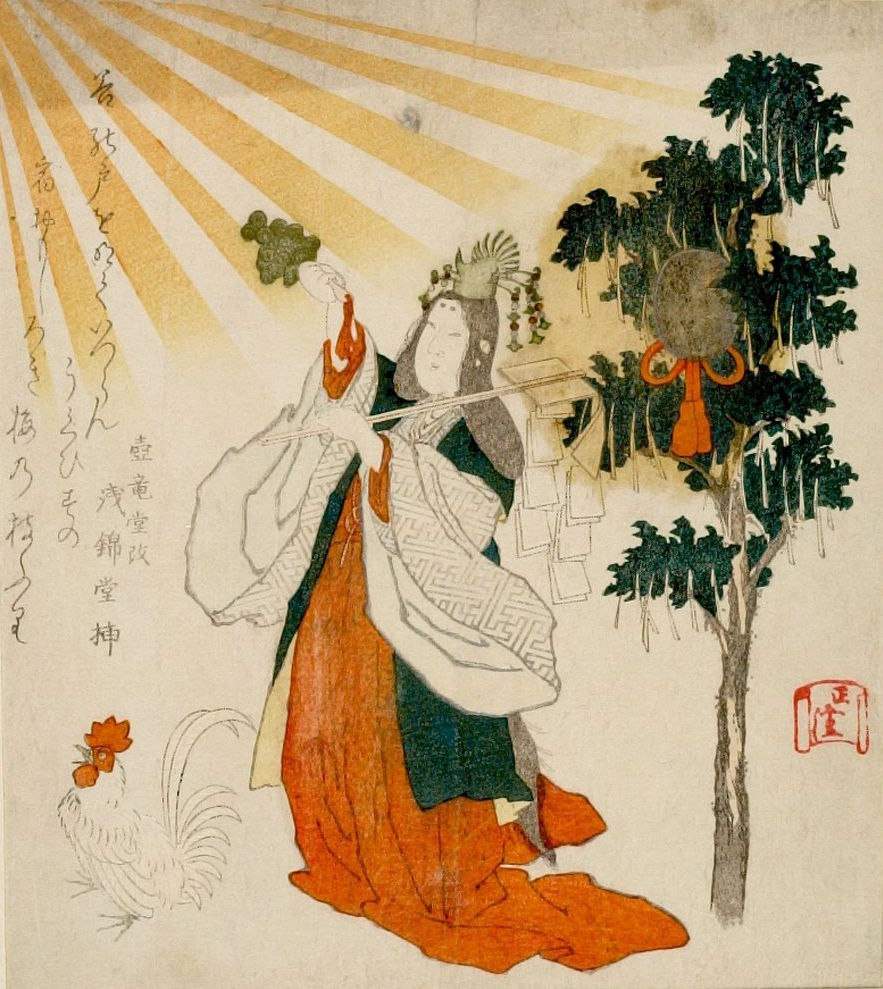
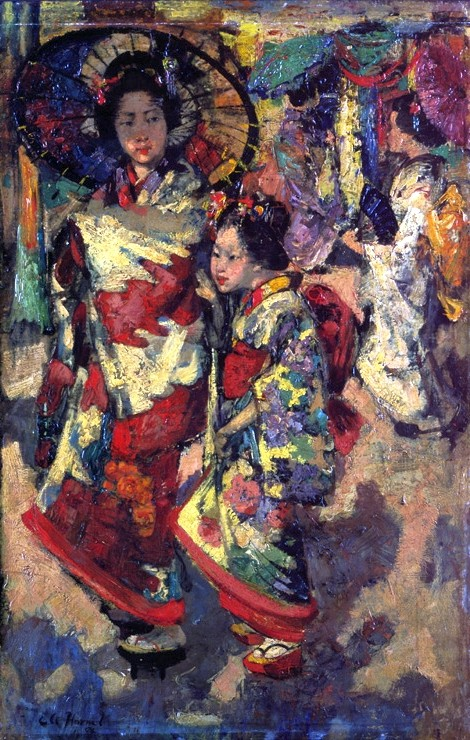
Asuka has been associated with Ama-no-Uzume, a Shinto deity linked to dance and sensuality, as well as to the red color, typical of the lining of some kimono.

According to Yūichirō Oguro, editor of the bonus features included with the series' home video releases, Asuka suffers from a masculine protest, a psychological expression that indicates exaggeratedly masculine tendencies in tired and rebellious women who protest against traditional female gender roles. She sees her male peers merely as rivals and spectators of her abilities, and suffers from a marked emotional complex for the male sex, merging a so-called "radical rivalry" and a latent inferiority complex. Her masculine protest is reflected in her strong misandric tendencies, since she is dominated by the need to beat male peers with an obsessive self-affirmation desire. Despite this, she also has a sense of admiration for her guardian and senpai, Ryoji Kaji. Asuka is emotionally dependent on him, since she has a strong unconscious desire to find a reference figure to rely on. Scholar Alba G. Torrents described Kaji as Asuka's "father figure". Asuka's infatuation also leads her to feel great jealousy for him and to seduce him. Kaji rejects her advances, saying she's too young, but Asuka insists that she is already grown up. Newtype magazine also noted how she sometimes beats boys while being kind to Kaji.

In the latter part of the series, overwhelmed by the fear of being alone, Asuka shows that she has a great and morbid need for the Eva, even more than her colleague Shinji has. In a scene from the twenty-fifth episode, she excoriates the Evangelion unit as a "worthless piece of junk", but immediately admits "I'm the junk". In the director's cut version of the twenty-second episode, two scenes set in the ninth and fifteenth episodes were added, in which Asuka appears frustrated in front of the sliding door of her room and after the kiss with Shinji; from Asuka's dialogue that overlaps these scenes, it becomes clear that she has been looking for help and love from Shinji. Her self-love represents an act of psychological compensation to be recognized in the eyes of other people. After her mother's mental illness, she represses her sadness and eventually decides to not cry anymore and to behave like an adult with a reaction formation. Her memories related to her past and her mother are repressed and removed from her consciousness during this phase. In the last episodes, Asuka completely loses her self-confidence. She develops a deep disgust with herself and suffers from separation anxiety. The caption "attachment behavior" (愛着行動) also appears in the same episodes. The word attachment in psychology can also refer to the emotional bond that is established between the mother and her child; for Asuka, boarding Eva-02 can therefore be regarded as a form of attachment.

Later commentators widely identified Asuka with the tsundere archetype, although the term itself had not yet come into use during the original television broadcast. In a 2007 interview voice actress Yuko Miyamura also described her as tsundere. Furthermore, for Japanese philosopher and cultural critic Hiroki Azuma, she is the "symbol of the outside" in the world of Evangelion, taking Shinji away from his comfort zone in the "Nerv family"; in contrast to Rei, who'd play an "imaginary healing" role, Asuka would be an independent person in reality. Critics also noted that Asuka is iconographically and psychologically opposed to Rei. Rei has blue hair and red eyes and is often associated with the Moon, while Asuka has red hair and blue eyes and is presented in the eighth episode, "Asuka Strikes!", silhouetted by the Sun. Rei is also related to white; writer Claudio Cordella noted how white is associated in Japanese culture with sanctity, light, and eternity, while red is the color of sterile sexuality, traditionally chosen by unmarried girls or geisha for their kimono. Japanese psychiatrist Kōji Mizobe linked Asuka's red to menstruation, compared to Rei's white to altruism, attributing Asuka's unstable behavior to a narcissistic or histrionic personality disorder. Writer Dennis Redmond instead noted that Shinji's Eva-01 is purple, halfway between Rei's blue Eva-00 and Asuka's 02, describing Rei as a symbol of an empty and "lyric neonational interiority", while Asuka as a mirror of a pragmatic and "outrageous multinational exteriority". Polygon has written on how the two are different shades of the same spectrum of "feminine", neither of which is good or bad in themselves, and which Shinji must recognize as autonomous individuals by overcoming the Madonna–whore complex — the inability of some men to see women in their individual nuances, perceiving them dichotomously either as angelic beings or maleficent entities.

The three Children have been compared to the three stages of the human soul postulated by the Jewish Kabbalah: Asuka to Nephesh, source of animal vitality, Shinji to Ru'ah, the soul, fruit of the raising of man from his purely biological aspect, and Rei to Neshamah, the spirit, fruit of the connection between man and God. Critic Patrick Drazen linked Asuka to Ama-no-Uzume, a Shinto female deity associated with dance and sensuality. Hiroki Azuma also described Asuka and the other characters in the series as "stereotypical characters", with no particular individual or aesthetic characteristics; Asuka, in particular, has been described as a "typical sci-fi anime character". According to Azuma, however, with these stereotypical characters Anno would have been able to describe the 1990s. Mizobe described her and Shinji as "communicationally disabled", a feature that allowed contemporary Japanese youth to identify with them even twenty-six years after the original series's airing. Moreover, for the critic Manabu Tsuribe in The End of Evangelion she represents for Shinji the Other, another person separated from himself with whom he can never become one. For Tsuribe, the film concludes when Shinji recognizes Asuka as a separate entity. The Anime Café's Japanese critic Akio Nagatomi, noting how other characters in Evangelion bear similarities with others from Gunbuster, a previous work by Gainax and Anno, described Asuka as a counterpart to Jung Freud. Writer Alexandre Marine identified Nadia from The Secret of Blue Water as a prototype for Asuka, while Virginie Nebbia linked Asuka's backstory to Kushana's mother from Hayao Miyazaki's Nausicaä of the Valley of the Wind, who, like Kyoko, mistakes a doll for her daughter and speaks to it. Engineer Yumiko Yano also compared Asuka's dull gaze in the final episodes, locked up in a hospital room after a psychic and emotional breakdown, to the dolls of artist Katan Amano.

== Cultural impact ==
=== Popularity ===
If you're an anime fan, you've definitely heard of Asuka, even if you haven't watched Evangelion. She's ranked high in popularity polls for a reason, and it's easy to see why. As one of the more dynamic characters in the show, she commands every scene that she's in ... I first saw this series as a teenager myself, and seeing Asuka at her highs and her lows felt extremely validating. There's a lot of truth to be told in the problems that she has .... The story never forces her to become a cleaner version of herself, but lets her have struggles in a way that not many series would allow. She isn't perfect, far from it, and there's a lot of strength to be found in that.

— Noelle Ogawa (Crunchyroll)

Asuka appeared in polls on best anime pilots and female anime characters, proving popular among both female and male audiences. In 1996 she ranked third among the "most popular female characters of the moment" in the Anime Grand Prix survey by Animage magazine, behind Rei Ayanami and Hikaru Shido from Magic Knight Rayearth. In 1997 and 1998 Anime Grand Prixes, she remained among the top ten female characters; in 1997 she ranked in fourth place, while in 1998 she ranked sixth. Asuka also appeared in the magazine's monthly surveys, remaining in the top twenty in 1996, 1997 and 1998 polls. In 1999, Animage ranked her fortieth among the one hundred most popular anime characters.

Her popularity increased after the release of the second Rebuild of Evangelion movie; in August and September 2009 she emerged in first place and remained the most popular female Neon Genesis Evangelion character in Newtype magazine popularity charts, while in October she ranked tenth. In a Newtype poll in March 2010, she was voted the third most popular female anime character from the 1990s, immediately after Rei Ayanami and Usagi Tsukino from Sailor Moon. In February 2015, almost twenty years after the show first aired, she emerged again on the magazine's charts in sixth place. In 2017, she also ranked sixteenth among the characters Anime! Anime! site readers would "rather die than marry". Her line "Are you stupid?" (あんたバカ?, Anta baka?) also became widely used among hardcore fans after her first appearance in the eighth episode. In 2021, after the release of the final Rebuild film, Asuka ranked as the most popular female character in another Newtype poll.

=== Critical reception ===
A fan cosplaying as Asuka in Shibuya for Halloween, 2023

Asuka divided anime critics, receiving an ambivalent response. Negative reviews criticized her arrogant, surly and authoritarian character. While appreciating her for providing "a good dose of comic relief" to Evangelion, Anime Critic Pete Harcoff described her as "an annoying snot". Raphael See from THEM Anime Reviews, who found Neon Genesis Evangelion's characterization "a little cliché, or just plain irritating at times", despised Asuka for her arrogant attitude. Anime Reign writer Matthew Perez described her as initially "overly stuck up", but he also appreciated her evolution. By contrast, IGN critic Ramsey Isler ranked her as the thirteenth greatest anime character of all time for the realism of her characterization, saying: "She's a tragic character, and a complete train wreck, but that is what makes her so compelling because we just can't help but watch this beautiful disaster unfold." Comic Book Resources included her among the best anime female pilots, describing her as "the best classic tsundere in shounen anime" and "one of the most fascinating characters in anime".

Screen Rant ranked her among the best Neon Genesis Evangelion characters, praising her development. According to critic Dennis Redmond, Asuka is "the first credible multinational character" in the history of Japanese science fiction television. Crunchyroll and Charapedia also praised her realism and personality. Asuka's fight sequence against the Mass-Production Evangelions in The End of Evangelion was particularly well received by website Anime Critic, while Tiffany Grant was praised for her role as Asuka's English voice actress by Mike Crandol of Anime News Network. Animation Insider reviewer Eric Surrell commented on Asuka's role in Evangelion: 2.0 You Can (Not) Advance (2009), the second installment of the Rebuild saga, stating that "the arrival and sudden dismissal of Asuka was shocking and depressing, especially considering how integral she was to the original Evangelion". Slant Magazine's Simon Abrams, reviewing Evangelion: 2.0, responded negatively to Shinji and Asuka's new relationship, "which is unfortunate because that bond should have the opportunity to grow in its own time". LA Weekly's Brian Miller appreciated her debut, praising Shinji's "downright charming" courtship. The Fandom Post found the character neglected by Anno's script, given the lesser space devoted to her and Mari's introduction, while Renan Fontes from Comic Book Resources judged Asuka Shikinami significantly less interesting than Langley. UK Anime Network on the other hand found Rebuild's Asuka a more human and easier-to-empathize-with character than that of the classic series.

=== Legacy ===
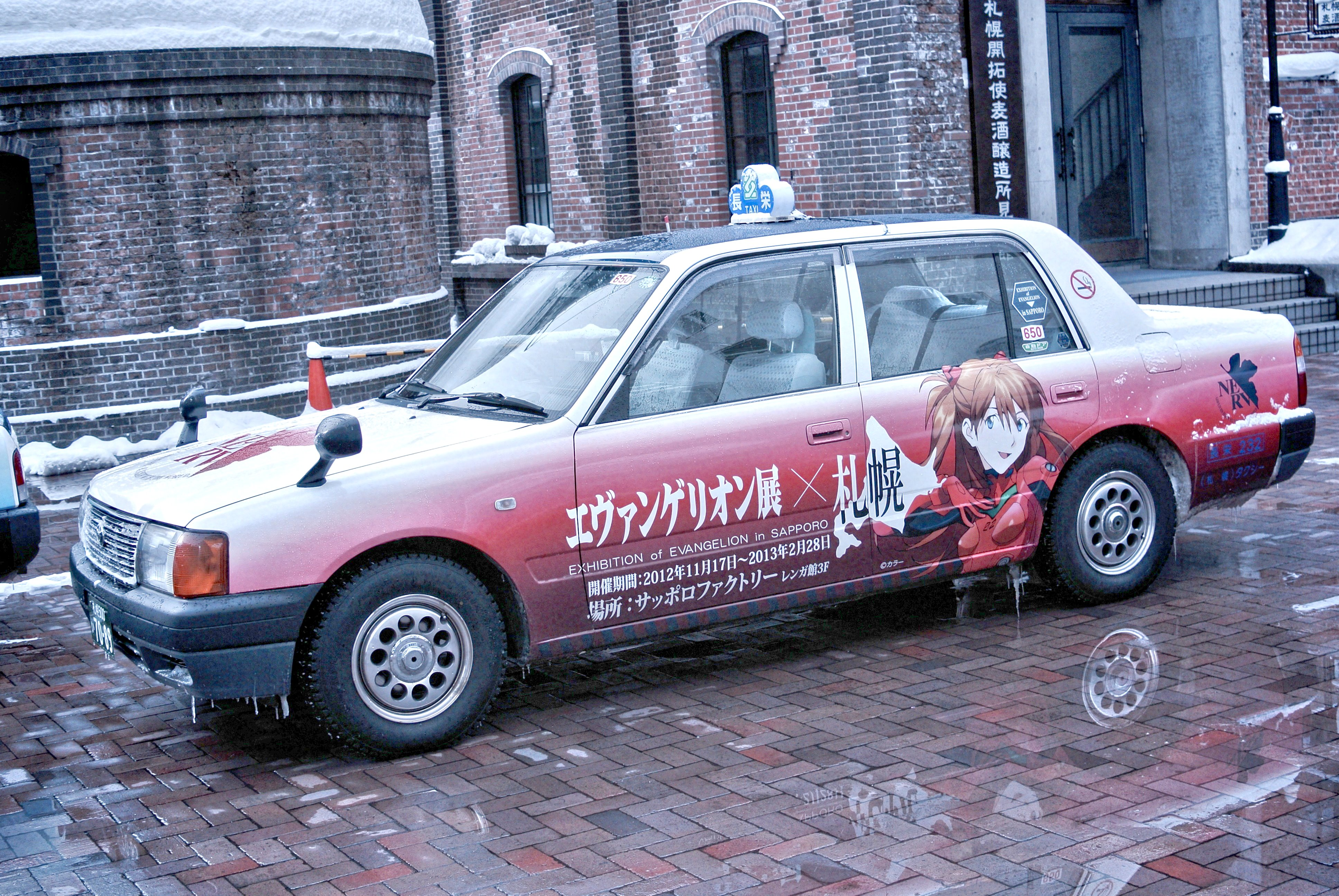
Asuka-decorated taxi in Sapporo

Asuka's character has been used for merchandising items such as life-size figures, action figures, guitars, clothes, and underwear, some of which sold out immediately. Her action figures proved successful. According to Japanese writer Kazuhisa Fujie, Evangelion-related household items with the image of Asuka or other female characters of the series have become so popular that they have been put back on the market with a second edition. Movic has also released a cassette drama featuring her and Shinji as part of its Animate series featuring other popular works. On February 27, 1997, Kadokawa Shoten published a book dedicated to her entitled Asuka - Evangelion Photograph (ＡＳＵＫＡ－アスカ－ 新世紀エヴァンゲリオン文庫写真集). In 2008, Broccoli released a video game entitled Shin Seiki Evangelion: Ayanami Ikusei Keikaku with Asuka Hokan Keikaku, in which the player takes on the task of looking after Asuka or Rei Ayanami.

Japanese celebrities cosplayed her during concerts or tours, such as Haruka Shimazaki, singer Hirona Murata and Saki Inagaki. Lai Pin-yu, a Taiwanese Democratic Progressive Party and Legislative Yuan member, held election rallies cosplaying Asuka, gaining popularity. Asuka's character was parodied by Excel from Excel Saga and some of her aesthetic and character traits inspired other female characters. Kotaku writer Richard Eisenbeins listed her as an example of the tsundere stereotype, a term used to indicate grumpy, assertive and authoritarian characters that nonetheless possess a more gentle, empathetic and insecure side, hidden due to a stormy past or traumatic experiences. Anthony Gramuglia from Comic Book Resources identified her as one of the most popular and influential tsundere characters, comparing Asuna Yūki from Sword Art Online, Rin Tōsaka from Fate/stay night, Kyō Sōma from Fruits Basket and Taiga Aisaka from Toradora! to her. Collider writer Lucas Kloberdanz-Dyck similarly credited Asuka with popularizing the tsundere archetype to a significant extent and helping establish its widespread popularity in anime: "Whether in a romance or action setting, every tsundere owes a debt of gratitude [to Asuka]". Critics also compared Mai Shibamura from Gunparade March, Michiru Kinushima from Plastic Memories and D.Va from the Overwatch game series to Asuka.

Japanese band L'Arc-en-Ciel took inspiration from the character for their song "Anata". Further references have been identified in other Japanese animated series, including Sayonara, Zetsubou-Sensei, Wotakoi: Love Is Hard for Otaku, Gurren Lagann, and Sword Art Online, in which a scene of her and Rei in an elevator from the twenty-second episode is parodied.

== See also ==
- List of Neon Genesis Evangelion characters
