= Cyber Core =

1990 video game

- Developer: Alfa System
- Publishers: TurboGrafx-16: JP: IGS; NA: NEC; X68000: JP: SPS
- Director: Kenji Hisatomi
- Producer: Kotoshi Yokoyama
- Designers: Kiyofumi Katō; Satoru Kubota
- Programmer: Sei Mochizuki
- Artist: Masashige Yumoto
- Writer: Syuichi Kouyama
- Composers: Masahiro Teramoto; Toshio Murai
- Platforms: TurboGrafx-16, X68000
- Release: TurboGrafx-16: JP: March 9, 1990; NA: May 1990; X68000: JP: October 25, 1991
- Genre: Scrolling shooter
- Mode: Single-player

Cyber Core (Note: Japanese: サイバーコア, Hepburn: Saibā Koa) is a 1990 vertically scrolling shooter video game developed by Alfa System and published in Japan by Information Global Service (IGS) and in North America by NEC for the TurboGrafx-16. Set in the year 2269 where Earth has been overrun by an alien race known as Hyper Insects, the player controls a Chimera bio-fighter craft, piloted by the enforcer Rad Ralph (Kato Melange in the Japanese version) in order to fend off the invaders and reclaim the planet. Similar to Dragon Spirit, Ralph has a projectile weapon for destroying air-based enemies and a bomb for destroying ground-based enemies.

Co-headed by director Kenji Hisatomi and producer Kotoshi Yokoyama, Cyber Core was the first shoot 'em up title created by Alfa System, who would later work on future projects such as Down Load and the Shikigami no Shiro series. First released on the TurboGrafx-16, the game was ported to the X68000 by SPS, featuring improved visuals and audio, as well as a rebalanced difficulty. The X68000 conversion has since been re-released only in Japan for Microsoft Windows through D4 Enterprise's Project EGG download service.

Cyber Core on the TurboGrafx-16 received mostly positive reception from critics, but the X68000 conversion was met with mixed reception; reviewers drew comparisons with Dragon Spirit due to its gameplay system but praise was given to its technical performance, visual presentation, sound, and fast-paced gameplay, but criticism was geared towards the repetitive action and enemy attack patterns, while many were divided in regards to its difficulty.

== Gameplay ==
Defeating Hyper Insects in the second stage of the game

Cyber Core is a science fiction-themed vertical-scrolling shoot 'em up game. The plot takes place in the year 2269, where Earth has been overrun by a cybernetic alien race called Hyper Insects. Their primary base is an underground mobile fort known only as the mothership. To fend off the Hyper Insects, Earth's defense forces create an insect-themed bio-jet in similar form to the enemy called the Chimera, which mutates the pilot into a humanoid insect upon use. This occurs to protagonist Rad Ralph (Kato Melange in the Japanese version), who has been assigned to attack the Hyper Insects and reclaim Earth.

The gameplay structure is similar to Xevious and Dragon Spirit. The player controls the Chimera through eight increasingly difficult stages over a constantly scrolling background, populated with an assortment of enemies and the scenery never stops moving until a boss is reached, which must be fought in order to progress further. The Chimera moves in eight directions and is equipped with two main weapons: a projectile weapon for air-based enemies and a bomb for ground-based enemies. The Chimera can mutate into four types of weapons by collecting their respective color eggs when shooting at the supply carrier.

Collecting three eggs in a row also grants the Chimera shield units to sustain enemy hits but this can also prove to be a risky proposition, as the Chimera's size is increased when more weapon eggs are collected. The Chimera can also acquire special egg types, which are dropped when firing at bosses or enemy formations, that grants additional abilities such as invincibility and a destruction egg capable of obliterating enemies and bullets on-screen. The Chimera is equipped with a speed setting, which can be increased or decreased across three levels by pressing its dedicated button. The title uses a checkpoint system in which the Chimera will start off at the beginning of the checkpoint the player managed to reach before dying. Getting hit by enemy fire reduces the Chimera's firepower and shield, which results in losing a live once the shields are depleted. The game is over once all lives are lost, though the player can use limited continues at the title screen to keep playing.

== Development and release ==
Cyber Core was the first shoot 'em up title created by Alfa System, who would later work on future projects such as Down Load and the Shikigami no Shiro series. Its development was co-led by director Kenji Hisatomi and producer Kotoshi Yokoyama. Sei Mochizuki and a member under the pseudonym "Bokegi!" served as co-programmers. The scenario was written by Syuichi Kouyama, while Kiyofumi Katō and Satoru Kubota acted as co-designers, in addition of Masashige Yumoto acting as illustrator. The soundtrack was co-composed by Masahiro Teramoto, who also created the game's sound effects, and Toshio Murai.

Cyber Core was first published in Japan by Information Global Service (IGS) on March 9, 1990, for the PC Engine and later in North America by NEC in May for the TurboGrafx-16. The game was ported to the X68000 by SPS on October 25, 1991, featuring improved visuals and audio, as well as a rebalanced difficulty. The original X68000 version has since been re-released in digital form for Microsoft Windows through D4 Enterprise's Project EGG service on March 26, 2013.

== Reception ==
Reception

Review scores
Publication	Score
Aktueller Software Markt	(TG-16) 11/12
Electronic Gaming Monthly	(TG-16) 7/10, 8/10, 7/10, 6/10
Famitsu	(TG-16) 8/10, 6/10, 8/10, 7/10
Génération 4	(TG-16) 65%
Joystick	(TG-16) 82%
VideoGames & Computer Entertainment	(TG-16) 7/10
Oh!X	(X68K) 8/10
Power Play	(TG-16) 79%
Technopolis	(X68K) 3/7

Cyber Core on the TurboGrafx-16 received mostly positive reception from critics, most of which reviewed it as an import title. Public reception of the original PC Engine release was mixed; readers of PC Engine Fan voted to give the game a 19.26 out of 30 score, ranking at the number 378 spot in a poll, indicating a middling following. The X68000 conversion was also met with mixed reception from reviewers.

Famitsu's four reviewers drew comparisons with Dragon Spirit due to its gameplay system, but they praised the game's sense of speed, as well as the insect character sprites for being quite attractive and slightly creepy but criticized the enemy attack patterns. Génération 4's Philippe Querleux also felt that the title was similar to Dragon Spirit, but with mecha and insect characters. Regardless, Querleux expressed that "fans of the genre will not be disappointed" with Cyber Core. Aktueller Software Markt's Torsten Oppermann noted that the game borrowed ideas from Dragon Spirit as well, but stated that it stands out among the PC Engine library. Oppermann commended visuals, sound and addictive gameplay.

Joystick's Jean-Marc Demoly gave positive remarks to its animated graphics, sound and controls. Electronic Gaming Monthly's four reviewers criticized its repetitive action for not being varied as Blazing Lazers and lack of difficulty balance due to the overpowered weapons. Nevertheless, they gave positive commentary to the frantic gameplay, graphical presentation and large bosses. Power Play's Martin Gaksch praised Cyber Core for its technical performance, good visuals, enemy variety, sound and customizable gameplay. Gaksch also commended the game's adjustable difficulty system that changes the enemy's behavior based on how much items are collected, but noted that it "stole" ideas from both Dragon Spirit and Tiger-Heli.

VideoGames & Computer Entertainment's Clayton Walnum gave positive remarks to the vivid backgrounds, detailed insect sprites, music, interesting sound effects and fast-pacing but felt mixed in regards to the difficult playability. Takahashi Tetushi of Japanese magazine Oh!X gave the X68000 version a positive overview, commending its graphics and music. In contrast, Japanese publication Technopolis gave the X68000 port a mixed outlook. Hardcore Gaming 101's Steven Barbato noted its Nausicaa of the Valley of the Wind-esque world and aesthetic, as well as the skill-based power-up system but criticized the game's difficulty for being occasionally unfair.
