= Tales of the World: Narikiri Dungeon 2 =

2002 video game

- Game cover
- Developers: Wolf Team & Alfa System
- Publisher: Namco
- Series: Tales
- Platform: Game Boy Advance
- Release: JP: October 25, 2002
- Genre: Action role-playing game
- Mode: Single-player

Tales of the World: Narikiri Dungeon 2 (テイルズオブザワールド なりきりダンジョン2, Teiruzu Obu za Waarudo Narikiri Danjon 2) is a spin-off from the Tales RPG series made by Namco. The game was released exclusively in Japan for the Game Boy Advance in October 2002. Tales of the World: Narikiri Dungeon 2's characteristic genre name is Cosplay RPG (コスプレRPG, Kosupure RPG). While it succeeds Tales of Phantasia: Narikiri Dungeon, this was the first game in the Tales of the World series, which is known for featuring characters from various main Tales games.

Narikiri Dungeon 2, like Tales of Phantasia: Narikiri Dungeon, is a dungeon crawler/RPG. It features the Condensed Linear Motion Battle System, a variation of the series' trademark battle system.

== Characters ==
=== Main ===
Frio Sven: The hero of the story, he is an apprentice blacksmith who is quick to jump into action, despite the fact that it always winds up getting him into trouble. He has a rather short attention span and is constantly getting on Kyaro's nerves, especially when he shows his obliviousness to her love for him.

Kyaro Olange: The logical heroine of the tale, she is interested in the tales told to her by the village elder, Lyle. She always tries to be the adult in the group and usually ends up dragging Frio out of trouble. Kyaro is always being irritated by the way he and the village children are always doing something to stir up trouble.

Thanatos: The antagonist, he is an enigma wrapped in mystery. He is able to possess the heroes through the use of the black crystals. He speaks of cleansing this world of the "human filth who have betrayed my mama and me", but he refuses to rationalize with anybody. Thanatos also seems to wish for Ada and Stella, the two Goddesses of their world, to perish as well.

=== Goddesses ===
Ada: The goddess of the future. The eldest Goddess, she is kind, gentle and logical. She watches over the Great Tree, and summons the heroes from the other worlds to assist Frio and Kyaro.

Ciel: The goddess of the present. The middle Goddess, she is selfless, wise, and brave. Millennia ago, she went missing. It is believed that she sacrificed herself in order to destroy the mysterious Dragon God. She has never been seen since, but it is shown that she is missed by her sisters in the start of the game.

Stella: The goddess of the past. The youngest Goddess, she is curious, vigilant, and idealistic. She is particularly interested in the human race.

== Release and reception ==
Reception

Review score
Publication	Score
Famitsu	9/10, 8/10, 8/10, 7/10

Tales of the World: A Narikiri Dungeon 2 was released in Japan for the Game Boy Advance on October 25, 2002.

Four writers in the Japanese magazine Famitsu reviewed the game. One complimented the game's action-based combat and high degree of freedom and character customization for strategic gameplay. Two others found that game a bit scattered, with one saying that there were so many elements to keep track of it gave the impression of it being a bit confusing.
