= Tales of the World: Narikiri Dungeon 3 =

2005 video game

- Cover art
- Developer: Alfa System
- Publisher: Namco
- Series: Tales
- Platform: Game Boy Advance
- Release: JP: January 6, 2005
- Genre: Tactical RPG
- Mode: Single-player

Tales of the World: Narikiri Dungeon 3 (テイルズオブザワールド なりきりダンジョン3, Teiruzu Obu za Waarudo Narikiri Danjon 3) is a spin-off from the Tales RPG series made by Namco. The game was released exclusively in Japan for the Game Boy Advance on January 6, 2005. Tales of the World: Narikiri Dungeon 3's characteristic genre name is Cosplay S-RPG (コスプレS-RPG, Kosupure S-RPG).

== Story ==
Frio and Kyaro, two teenagers, love the Tales legends and read about them every day before they go to sleep. After an earthquake, Dr. Brown finds an ancient time traveling machine in the ruins. Using this, they can go see the Tales legends. They go to sleep and prepare for tomorrow. Before Frio went to sleep, he read a Tales legend again, but this one ended strangely: the hero arrives too late and the world is destroyed.

When Frio and Kyaro wake up, they find out the machine has been stolen. Not long after they find out, a re-color of the machine appears. The one boarding it was Dr. White, a.k.a. Dr. Brown from 100 days into the future whose hair had turned white from extreme stress.

There are thieves who are ruining the timeline of the Tales legends, and they have to be stopped. Dr. White now needs Frio and Kyaro to help stop the thieves and brings with him the aid of the heroes from Tales of Symphonia, Destiny, and Eternia.

== Gameplay ==
Tales of the World: Narikiri Dungeon 3 is a turn-based tactical RPG as well as a real-time RPG. Battles take place in enclosed areas that include ally parties and enemy units. Players move parties (consisting of three characters each) by selecting the sprite of the party's player-controlled character, then selecting the target location on the map. The limit of where the party can travel is indicated by dots between the target destination and the starting point of the party. When the dots are gray, the party can move to that location, as long as an obstacle does not block them. If it is red, then the target is out of range. The player can alter the destination of the party at any time during the player's turn. When the player ends the turn, all ally parties will move simultaneously. When one of the players' parties comes in contact with an enemy party, the player engages in a LMBS-style battle. In a typical RPG fashion, players level up their party members to gain stat increases. Like many Tales games, Narikiri Dungeon 3 includes the aspect of cooking: players can use acquired ingredients to prepare meals that affect party members, like replenishing HP, or temporarily gaining a certain stat in battle.

== Character list ==
Tales of the World:

- Julio Sven
- Caro Orange
- Thanatos
- Clyte
- Ponnie
- Masked Boy
- Masked Girl
- Jababa

Tales of Phantasia:

- Cress Albane
- Chester Burklight
- Mint Adenade
- Claus F. Lester
- Arche Klein
- Suzu Fujibayashi
- Ami
- Dhaos

Tales of Destiny:

- Stahn Aileron
- Rutee Kartret (Rutee Katrea)
- Mary Agent (Mary Argent)
- Lion Magnus (Leon Magnus)
- Philia Felice
- Woodrow Kelvin (Garr Kelvin)
- Chelsea Tone (Chelsea Torn)
- Mighty Kongman (Bruiser Khang)
- Johnny Shiden (Karyl Sheeden)
- Lilith Aileron

Tales of Eternia:

- Reid Hershel
- Farah Oersted
- Keele Zeibel
- Meredy
- Ras
- Chat
- Fog (Max)
- Shizel
- Celsius

Tales of Destiny 2:

- Kyle Dunamis
- Loni Dunamis
- Judas
- Reala
- Nanaly Fletch
- Harold Berselius
- Barbatos Goetia
- Elraine

Tales of Symphonia:

- Lloyd Irving
- Genius Sage (Genis Sage)
- Collet Brunel (Colette Brunel)
- Refill Sage (Raine Sage)
- Kratos Aurion
- Shihna Fujibayashi (Sheena Fujibayashi)
- Zelos Wilder
- Presea Combatir
- Regal Bryan (Regal Bryant)
- Yggdrasil (Mithos Yggdrasill)
