= Emerald Dragon =

1989 video game

- Developers: Glodia; Alfa System (console versions)
- Publishers: Basho House (PC-88, PC-98); Glodia (X68000, MSX2, FM Towns); NEC Home Electronics (PC Engine CD); MediaWorks (SFC)
- Designer: Akihiro Kimura
- Composer: Yasuhiko Fukuda
- Platforms: PC-8801mkII SR, PC-9801 VM/UV, X68000, MSX2, FM Towns, PC Engine Super CD-ROM², Super Famicom
- Release: December 22, 1989; Super CD-ROM²: JP: January 29, 1994; Super Famicom: JP: July 28, 1995
- Genre: Role-playing
- Mode: Single-player

Emerald Dragon (エメラルドドラゴン, Emerarudo Doragon) is a role-playing video game developed by Glodia and released for multiple platforms in Japan. It was first launched for the NEC PC-8801 and PC-9801 home computers on December 22, 1989, followed by conversions for the X68000 (released on December 6, 1990), MSX2 (released on December 26 of the same year), and FM Towns (released on May 28, 1992). Developer Alfa System later produced console versions of the game for the PC Engine in Super CD-ROM² format (released on January 29, 1994) and the Super Famicom (released on July 28, 1995). The game features characters and locations based on Zoroastrian mythology.

== Gameplay ==
Super Famicom screenshot

The game utilizes a top-down overhead perspective, in which players move the controllable character in two dimensions. As players navigate the world map, they may encounter battles that are turn-based and employ a time point system: both movement and attacks deplete a bar displayed at the top of the screen, and a character's turn ends when this bar is exhausted. Experience points, used to level up playable characters, are earned by defeating enemies.

Stronger attacks for the main protagonist, Atorushan, become available through the collection of key items called Emerald Graces. These items allow him to transform into a dragon to unleash a powerful attack, at the cost of reducing his HP when used.

== Plot ==
A long time ago, dragons and humans lived in peace in the land of Ishbahn. Lord Tiridates, believing that the presence of dragons among humans defiles Ishbahn, casts a curse that kills dragons in the region. Some of the dragons—now collectively known as the Dragon Tribe—manage to escape and find refuge in Draguria, where a dimensional rift prevents humans from crossing.

At the start of the game, a ship wrecks on the coast of Draguria. The protagonist, a Dragon Tribe youth named Atorushan, seeks the friendship of the sole survivor, a human girl named Tamryn, under the guidance of the White Dragon, leader of the tribe. The girl is cared for by the dragons of the land, but twelve years later, she departs in search of happiness among her own kind. Atorushan breaks off his left horn and gives it to her as a means of summoning him should she ever require help.

Three years after this event, Atorushan is summoned by the White Dragon, as the horn has been blown. Granting him a silver scale to protect him from the curse of Ishbahn, the White Dragon sends him to the human world to aid Tamryn.

Upon his arrival, Atorushan discovers that all of Ishbahn is under attack by evil armies commanded by Tiridates. To defeat him and lift the curse from the land, Atorushan must locate the five Emerald Graces—dragon-based treasures scattered throughout the realm—and resurrect the Emerald Dragon, the greatest of all dragons, destined to bring about a miracle.

== Release and reception ==
Reception

Review scores
| Publication | Score |
|---|---|
| Famitsu | 7/10, 6/10, 6/10, 7/10 (SFC) |
| Gekkan PC Engine | 90/100, 90/100, 90/100, 85/100, 85/100 (PCE) |
| Joypad | 94% (PCE) |
| Dengeki PC Engine | 90/100, 95/100, 90/100 (PCE) |

Emerald Dragon was released for the Super CD-ROM² add-on for the PC-Engine on January 29, 1994. It was later released for the Super Famicom in Japan on July 28, 1995.

== Legacy ==
Akihiro Kimura successfully crowdfunded a sequel audio series titled Elemental Dragoon in 2015. It is based on ideas that were proposed for a sequel to Emerald Dragon in the 1990s but never came to fruition due to apparent copyright issues. Despite this, Kimura and others created several independent dōjinshi and novels that continued the story over the years, as well as creating a video game adaptation of his audio series titled Elemental Dragoon: Futatsu no Hikari. The series was designed to circumvent copyright issues by focusing on new characters and slightly altering names, including the title, although the original characters appear at the end. It was also intended to help Kimura generate interest in a true sequel to Emerald Dragon and potentially regain the copyright.
