= Tatsunoko Fight =

2000 video game

- Developer(s): Electronics Application (Eleca)
- Publisher(s): Takara
- Artist(s): Roberto Ferrari
- Composer(s): Junzo Yagami; Chuji Nagaoka; Yoshiaki Kubotera; Yoshifumi Iwata; Noboru Iwata
- Platform(s): PlayStation
- Release: JP: October 5, 2000
- Genre(s): Fighting
- Mode(s): Single-player, multiplayer

Tatsunoko Fight (タツノコファイト, Tatsunoko Faito) is a fighting video game developed by Electronics Application (Eleca) and published by Takara for the PlayStation game console released in Japan in October 2000. It features characters from various Tatsunoko superhero properties in addition to original creations developed exclusively for the game. Each series is represented by characters, backgrounds, music, and voice actors from the original television programs, along with new art and animated sequences produced by Tatsunoko Production.

== Plot ==
In the future, a young scientist named Battering creates the "Salvasion System", a dimensional mobile device which allows for travel between parallel worlds. However, this device is stolen by the Demon King Dokucyber and his Jaleizer Empire to enact "Operation Dark Inferno", which sees Dokucyber, the Jaleizer Empire and all of the Tatsunoko villains from various worlds uniting to conquer the multiverse. To stop this, Battering created a combat strengthening suit to become Volter the Lightning and threw himself into the parallel worlds to unite with the Tatsunoko heroes and defeat Dokucyber and the Jaleizer Empire.

== Gameplay ==
Tatsunoko Fight is a two-dimensional, one-on-one fighting game where players must defeat their opponent in two of three rounds in order to advance. The game relies on using both normal and special attacks in order to damage the opponent, with a round ending once all of a character's remaining vitality has been lost. A special gauge at the bottom of the screen steadily fills when a character deals or receives damage, reaching a maximum of three levels. Player's can then expend one level at a time to unleash a more powerful super attack on their opponent to deal more damage. The game uses a combo system where light and heavy attacks can be chained together to launch a succession of attacks that cannot be interrupted or stopped until the sequence ends. In addition to normal versus mode, players may choose a round-robin-style team battle mode involving multiple characters, as well as a single-player story mode that resembles an arcade fighting game.

== Characters ==
A fight between Tekkaman (left) and Casshern (right)

Tatsunoko Fight features playable characters from four established Tatsunoko franchises: Science Ninja Team Gatchaman, Neo-Human Casshern, Tekkaman: The Space Knight, and Hurricane Polymar, as well an original series created exclusively for the game, Denkou Senka Volter (電光石火ヴォルター, literally "Lightning Warrior Volter"). Each series is represented by three members, consisting of a "Hero", "Supporter", and "Arch Rival" character from their respective titles. Original characters created solely for the game include the superhero Volter, his companion Neon, and their nemesis Karochi Taiki, as well as the game's primary antagonist, the demonic Rosraisen. Many of the game's characters are voiced by the actors who portrayed them in their original animated appearances, with additional supporting characters making cameo appearances throughout gameplay.

Character	Series	Voice actor
Ken Washio the Eagle	Science Ninja Team Gatchaman	Katsuji Mori
Jun Shiratori the Swan	Science Ninja Team Gatchaman	Kazuko Sugiyama
Berg Katse	Science Ninja Team Gatchaman	Yō Kitazawa
Casshern	Neo-Human Casshern	Ikuo Nishikawa
Luna Kotsuki	Neo-Human Casshern	Emiko Tsukada
Buraiking Boss	Neo-Human Casshern	Kenji Utsumi
Tekkaman	Tekkaman: The Space Knight	Katsuji Mori
Andro Umeda	Tekkaman: The Space Knight	Nachi Nozawa
Doburai	Tekkaman: The Space Knight	Takeshi Kuwabara
Hurricane Polymar	Hurricane Polymar	Kazuyuki Sogabe
Teru Nanba	Hurricane Polymar	Akiko Hiramatsu
Astral Chameleon	Hurricane Polymar/Original character	Takeshi Aono
Volter	Denkou Senka Volter/Original character	Shin-ichiro Miki
Neon	Denkou Senka Volter/Original character	Hyo-sei
Karochi Taiki	Denkou Senka Volter/Original character	Yoku Shioya
Rosraisen	Original character	Nachi Nozawa

== See also ==
- Tatsunoko vs. Capcom
