= Neon Genesis Evangelion 2 =

PlayStation 2 video game

- PS2 boxart
- Developer: Alfa System
- Publisher: Bandai
- Platforms: PlayStation 2, PlayStation Portable
- Release: PS2: JP: November 20, 2003; PSP: JP: April 27, 2006
- Genres: Role-playing video game, Adventure, Simulation
- Mode: Single-player

Neon Genesis Evangelion 2 (新世紀エヴァンゲリオン2, lit. 'Shinseiki Evangelion 2') "is a Japanese video game for the PlayStation 2 developed by Alfa System and published by Bandai. It has role-playing video game and world-controlling elements, and allows the player to follow a number of characters (such as Asuka Langley Soryu, Shinji Ikari, Pen², etc.) through multiple versions of the main plot of the anime Neon Genesis Evangelion. A PlayStation Portable port was released in 2006 under the name Shinseiki Evangelion 2 Tsukurareshi Sekai -another cases- and as part of the Neon Genesis Evangelion: DECADE -- 10 Year Anniversary Memorial Box.

The game contains 24 topics named "Classified Information" (Kimitsu Jouhou) which considerably expand upon the back-story: Adam and Lilith are "Seeds of Life," settlers sent to Earth by a "First Ancestral Race," along with the Spears of Longinus. The various Angels seek out the Black Moon of Lilith because they are seeking Lilith, or Adam; and so on. While the information seems to have been based on extensive interviews with Hideaki Anno, creator of the franchise, the canonicity of the information in the game has never been officially stated, as the involvement of the original Gainax staff was limited to the Classified Information material. However, Gainax continuously states that all necessary information has been provided in the series and films.

Besides the additional information, Neon Genesis Evangelion 2 also introduced a number of additions like F-type Equipment and the final products of the Jet Alone project (as in some storylines, the eighth episode does not end in the cancellation of the Jet Alone project), and includes several "Scenarios", including of comedic value, that disregard canon. Only Scenario 01, one of Shinji's scenarios, follows the series' own storyline relatively closely. The developers also state in a production log that they wanted to create their own "world of Evangelion". This is also expressed in their effort to create an "autonomous" simulation and characters. This allows the player to create numerous scenarios for characters, battles, and relationships.

== Gameplay ==
The player controls the Eva walking around a large map, until they run into an enemy. The player is then given a list of action commands which they can choose to attack the enemy. Once one of the action commands is chosen, a sequence will be shown, created by CGI depicting the attack. This was one of the most praised elements of the game. The game also has story arcs in which the player has a list of playable characters to choose from, to play as in the story mode. For example, the 3 main characters Shinji Ikari, Rei Ayanami, and Asuka Langley Soryu, are available from the start. More are unlocked as various game events are triggered.

== Reception ==
The game sold 111,787 copies the week of its release.

== See also ==
- List of Neon Genesis Evangelion video games
- Official Game Site (archive)
- Official Site Final Version (archived)
- 新世紀 エヴァンゲリオン2 Producer's Diary #1 (archived)
- Producer's Diary #2 (archived)
- Producer's Diary #2 (archived)
- 新世紀エヴァンゲリオン２ 開発日記 Development Diary (archived)
