= Gunparade March =

2000 video game

- Developer: Alfa System (Note: Additional work by Sony Computer Entertainment Japan.)
- Publisher: Sony Computer Entertainment
- Platform: PlayStation
- Release: JP: September 28, 2000
- Genres: Tactical role-playing, social simulation
- Mode: Single-player

Gunparade March (Note: Japanese: ガンパレード・マーチ, Hepburn: Ganparēdo Māchi) is a 2000 tactical role-playing video game developed by Alfa System and published by Sony Computer Entertainment for the PlayStation. It was released only in Japan.

It led to the release of a manga and anime series, and it was also re-released on the PlayStation Network for PlayStation 3 and PlayStation Portable. A sequel trilogy of games, titled Gunparade Orchestra were released for the PlayStation 2 in 2006.

== Gameplay ==
Gunparade March is a tactical role-playing game where mecha are controlled in combat. Combat is depicted as a map with symbols depicting characters; an "Action Code" can be inputted based on the player's choices. After the player ends their turn, the actual action can be viewed in more detailed cutscenes. Outside of combat, players partake in the characters' social lives.

== Plot ==
In 1945, World War II was abruptly ended when an alien race appeared on Earth and began to slaughter the human population. This alien force, known as the "Phantom Beasts" (or Genjyu in Japanese) had effectively taken over more than half of the Earth. The year is 1999 – 54 years later, mankind is still fighting to survive against the alien forces. Earth forces now use advanced mecha called Humanoid Walking Tanks (HWTs) to combat the invaders, but throughout the ordeal, far too many pilots have been killed in action. To ensure the future of the human race, the Japanese government enforced a student draft which recruited high school students to become HWT pilots. Gunparade March follows the lives of the 5121st Platoon, which consists mainly of drafted high school students and their struggle to defeat the Phantom Beasts and at the same time, lead a normal social life.

== Characters ==
Atsushi Hayami (速水 厚志, Hayami Atsushi) Voiced by: Akira Ishida (Japanese); Larry Law (English)
Atsushi is the main protagonists of the story and an HWT pilot. Hayami is probably one of the most shy and naive characters in Gunparade March. His personality renders him to be dubbed a "goof" among his colleagues and become somewhat an interest for several of the female characters. When he meets Mai, he develops an interest for her and gradually becomes infatuated with her. However, his timidity prevents him from admitting his true feelings and publicly, he considers her as a "good partner on the job". As an HWT pilot, his attributes are quite balanced and this caused him to be teamed with Mai for piloting the two-seater "Tandem" HWT. However, Hayami tends to be nervous during battles and has the habit of messing up. He also seems to be well aware of the concept that the Genjyu feed upon Human's fear and hatred for them which causes them to attack. This is shown when he elaborates a fairy tale (it is speculated that a fairy tale can bring one's childhood innocence back which eliminates most of one's hatred and fear) aloud while carrying Mai to a safe area when they were stranded in a forest full of Genjyu and the Genjyu were rendered motionless. Later on, the whole platoon tried to pair Mai and Hayami up by setting false tasks and trying to trap them into admitting each others true feelings. It initially appeared to be successful until Hayami's naive personality ended the operation in failure. During the New Year's Eve of 2001, Hayami admitted love to Mai and still pilots the Tandem with her.
Mai Shibamura (芝村 舞, Shibamura Mai) Voiced by: Akemi Okamura (Japanese); Deborah Sale Butler (English)
Mai is the main heroine of the story and an HWT pilot. Mai was a transfer pilot to the 5121st Platoon. She initially separated herself from everyone in the division but formed a friendship with Nonomi and eventually, the whole female crew of the platoon. She first saves Mibuya and Hayami when they were in the effective range of the PBE. Afterwards, she gained the gratitude of Hayami and a slight rivalry with Mibuya. Her skills as an HWT pilot are at near perfection. However, her teamwork is as relatively poor as her communication skills. Later on, Mai reveals that is the daughter of the head of Shibamura Industries. Despite that, she tries to lead a normal life and care for Nonomi, thinking she is responsible for her condition. When Hayami and Mai were stranded, she revealed why she came to join the army despite her status as being the daughter of the head of Shibamura. When she was in her old high school, she became infatuated with an elite HWT pilot but never admitted her feelings to him as he died fighting the Genjyu. Holding a grudge against the Genjyu, she trained to be an elite pilot and was eventually transferred to the 5121st platoon. After Hayami saves her, Mai begins to be infatuated with him but again, she is too shy to admit her true feelings to him.

== Adaptations ==
- Gunparade March
- Manga
- Illustrated by: Hiroyuki Sanadura
- Published by: MediaWorks
- Magazine: Dengeki Comics
- Original run: 2001 – 2003
- Volumes: 3
- Anime television series

Gunparade March: The New March
- Directed by: Katsushi Sakurabi
- Written by: Fumihiko Takayama
- Music by: Kenji Kawai
- Studio: J.C.Staff
- Licensed by: NA: Media Blasters (expired) Maiden Japan (current)
- Original network: MBS, TV Kanagawa
- Original run: February 6, 2003 – April 24, 2003
- Episodes: 12
- Anime television series

Gunparade Orchestra
- Directed by: Yutaka Sato (Chief); Toshiya Shinohara
- Written by: Yoshifumi Fukushima
- Music by: Hikaru Nanase; Masayoshi Furukawa
- Studio: Brain's Base
- Original network: ABC, NBN, TV Asahi
- Original run: October 5, 2005 – March 29, 2006
- Episodes: 24 + 3 OVA

=== Manga ===
A manga adaptation by Hiroyuki Sanadura was serialized in the magazine Dengeki Daioh. The three volumes published by MediaWorks between 2001 and 2003 were translated by ADV Manga between 2004 and 2005.

=== Anime ===
==== Gunparade March ====
===== Episodes =====
No.	Title	Original air date
1	"Playback -The Visitor-"; Transliteration: "Pureibakku -The Visitor-" (Japanese: プレイバック -The Visitor-)	February 6, 2003
2	"Do whatever you like - Going My Way"; Transliteration: "Katte ni Shi ya Gare -Going My Way-" (Japanese: 勝手にしやがれ -Going My Way-)	February 13, 2003
3	"Summer Blues -Fireworks-"; Transliteration: "Samātaimu Burūsu -Fire Works-" (Japanese: サマータイムブルース -Fire Works-)	February 20, 2003
4	"Let's Have Tea Together -Duelist-"; Transliteration: "Ni-nin de Ocha o -Duelist-" (Japanese: 二人でお茶を -Duelist-)	February 27, 2003
5	"Withered Leaf"; Transliteration: "Kareha -Thursday's Child-" (Japanese: 枯葉 -Thursday's Child-)	March 6, 2003
6	"After You Left"; Transliteration: "Kimi Sarishi Nochi -I Guess Everything Reminds You Of Something-" (Japanese: 君去りし後 -I Guess Everything Reminds You Of Something-)	March 13, 2003
7	"A Long Night"; Transliteration: "Nagai Yoru -In The Forests Of Nights-" (Japanese: 長い夜 -In The Forests Of Nights-)	March 20, 2003
8	"In April, She Will"; Transliteration: "Shigatsu ni Nareba Kanojo wa -With Your Musket, Fife, And Drum-" (Japanese: 四月になれば彼女は -With Your Musket, Fife, And Drum-)	March 27, 2003
9	"You Are the One Who Makes My Heart Pound"; Transliteration: "Kimi ni Koso Kokoro Tokimeku -A Day In The Life-" (Japanese: 君にこそ心ときめく -A Day In The Life-)	April 3, 2003
10	"Hello Sadness Once Upon a Dime"; Transliteration: "Kanashimi yo Kon'nichiwa -Once Upon A Dime-" (Japanese: 悲しみよこんにちは -Once Upon A Dime-)	April 10, 2003
11	"I Couldn't Bring It Up a Good Reward for Their Labor"; Transliteration: "Īdashi Kanete -A Good Reward For Their Labour-" (Japanese: 言い出しかねて -A Good Reward For Their Labour-)	April 17, 2003
12	"Every Time I Say Goodbye Gunparade March"; Transliteration: "Sayonara o Iutabi ni -Gun Parade March-" (Japanese: さよならを言う度に -Gun Parade March-)	April 24, 2003

==== Gunparade Orchestra ====
The story focuses and revolves around the 108th Guard Squad, stationed in Aomori, Aomori. A poorly equipped unit with very little military standing, it is often viewed as a 'reject camp' for pilots not making the grade for the elite units based in Hokkaido. The apparent helpless nature of this force is hardly a deterrent for the encroaching enemy armies, ever closing in on both the 108th and the rest of the empire. The young pilots of the 108th, who had dreamed on returning home, are plunged forcefully and unwillingly into a war.

===== Episodes =====
No.	Title	Original air date
1	"First Battle"; Transliteration: "Uijin" (Japanese: 初陣)	October 5, 2005
2	"Outbreak"; Transliteration: "Autobureiku" (Japanese: アウトブレイク)	October 12, 2005
3	"A Bridge Too Far"; Transliteration: "Tōsugita Hashi" (Japanese: 遠すぎた橋)	October 19, 2005
4	"Special Day"; Transliteration: "Tokubetsuna Ichi-nichi" (Japanese: 特別な一日)	October 26, 2005
5	"Underground"; Transliteration: "Andāguraundo" (Japanese: アンダーグラウンド)	November 2, 2005
6	"Seven Gold"; Transliteration: "Ōgon no Nana-nin" (Japanese: 黄金の七人)	November 9, 2005
7	Transliteration: "Haru Futō" (Japanese: 春不遠)	November 16, 2005
8	"Unfinished Symphony"; Transliteration: "Mikansei Kōkyōgaku" (Japanese: 未完成交響楽)	November 23, 2005
9	"Beyond the War"; Transliteration: "Senka no Kanata" (Japanese: 戦火のかなた)	November 30, 2005
10	"Dogs of War"; Transliteration: "Sensō no Inu-tachi" (Japanese: 戦争の犬たち)	December 7, 2005
11	"High Noon"; Transliteration: "Mahiru no Kettō" (Japanese: 真昼の決闘)	December 14, 2005
12	"The Wind Has Risen"; Transliteration: "Kaze Tachinu" (Japanese: 風立ちぬ)	December 21, 2005
13	"Tracker"; Transliteration: "Tsuiseki-sha" (Japanese: 追跡者)	January 11, 2006
14	"Strawberry Field"; Transliteration: "Noichigo" (Japanese: 野いちご)	January 18, 2006
15	"Rebel Without a Cause"; Transliteration: "Riyū Naki Hankō" (Japanese: 理由なき反抗)	January 25, 2006
16	"Duel!"; Transliteration: "Gekitotsu!" (Japanese: 激突!)	February 1, 2006
17	"All Quiet on the Western Front"; Transliteration: "Seibu Sensen Ijō Nashi" (Japanese: 西部戦線異状なし)	February 8, 2006
18	"The Door Into Summer"; Transliteration: "Natsu e no Tobira" (Japanese: 夏への扉)	February 15, 2006
19	"Planet Love"; Transliteration: "Koi Suru Wakusei" (Japanese: 恋する惑星)	February 22, 2006
20	"Sea of Prayers"; Transliteration: "Inori no Umi" (Japanese: 祈りの海)	March 1, 2006
21	"Satomi's World"; Transliteration: "Satomi no Sekai" (Japanese: 里美の世界)	March 8, 2006
22	"Senju of the South Island"; Transliteration: "Minami no Shima no Senju" (Japanese: 南の島の千寿)	March 15, 2006
23	"Marathon Man"; Transliteration: "Marason Man" (Japanese: マラソン・マン)	March 22, 2006
24	"In Late Summer"; Transliteration: "Natsu no Owari ni" (Japanese: 夏の終わりに)	March 29, 2006

== Reception ==
On release, Famitsu magazine scored the game a 31 out of 40. Due to its creativity and attention to detail, it won the prestigious 32nd Seiun Award for Best Dramatic Presentation, beating October Sky, Bicentennial Man, Juvenile, X-Men, and The Iron Giant. and It was a nominee for the "Game of the Year" from Japan Game Awards but lost to Phantasy Star Online (for Dreamcast, GameCube, Xbox and Windows 9x Compatible-PC).

== See also ==
- Elemental Gearbolt
- Mars Daybreak
- Loop8: Summer of Gods
