= Neon Genesis Evangelion: Ayanami Raising Project =

2001 video game

Neon Genesis Evangelion: Ayanami Ikusei Keikaku
- Developers: Gainax, Westone Bit Entertainment
- Publishers: BROCCOLI, Gainax
- Platforms: Windows, Dreamcast, PlayStation 2, Nintendo DS
- Release: May 18, 2001 (Windows); April 18, 2002 (Dreamcast); December 11, 2003 (PS2); August 28, 2008 (NDS)
- Genres: Life simulation, Raising simulation
- Mode: Single player

Neon Genesis Evangelion: Ayanami Raising Project (新世紀エヴァンゲリオン 綾波育成計画, Shin Seiki Evangelion: Ayanami Ikusei Keikaku) is a simulation game created by Gainax, based on the anime and manga series Neon Genesis Evangelion. The gameplay is similar to that of the Princess Maker series, also developed by Gainax. It was released for Microsoft Windows PCs in 2001. Dreamcast version was released the following year, ported by Westone Bit Entertainment.

A PlayStation 2 version called Shin Seiki Evangelion: Ayanami Ikusei Keikaku with Asuka Hokan Keikaku (新世紀エヴァンゲリオン 綾波育成計画withアスカ補完計画; lit. "Neon Genesis Evangelion: Ayanami Raising Project with Asuka Supplementing Project") was made another year later by Westone Bit Entertainment. The PS2 version has the original Ayanami route, as well as a new Asuka Route that can be unlocked. A Nintendo DS port of this version was released on August 28, 2008.

== Overview ==
In Ayanami Raising Project, the player takes on the role of a NERV officer who has just been assigned to Tokyo-3. Upon meeting with Commander Gendo Ikari, he is charged with taking care of the First Child, the mysterious Evangelion pilot Rei Ayanami. It is up to the player to decide Ayanami's weekly schedule, balancing between education, duties at NERV, and leisure. The game spans approximately one year, and includes the events of the entire anime series, as well as the movie The End of Evangelion.

The player can direct Rei or Asuka to have multiple scenarios in the ending. Rei has scenarios like becoming a violinist, S&M queen, policewoman or maid. Asuka can become a scientist, manga artist, singer, astronaut, nun, and more. Both girls can have endings where they form a relationship with the player character or Shinji.

== Characters ==
Ayanami Ikusei Keikaku revolves around the interaction between the player and Rei.

- The Lieutenant is the player character. He appears as a normal-looking young man, possibly in his twenties. He has short, brown hair. Although the majority of his personality depends on decisions made throughout the game, he is presented as good-natured and responsible, if a bit naive. The player is assigned by Gendo Ikari to care for Rei over the course of a year. He is given the rank 'Sanii' (lieutenant) and is referred to by his rank rather than whatever name the player inputs throughout the game. If the name is mentioned without 'Sanii' in the dialogue box, the name is simply not said. In the PS2 version, he is in charge of Asuka on Asuka's route. He has a younger sister, which is the reason he was assigned to take care of Asuka. Due to the slight difference of the way the guardian for Rei and Asuka refer to themselves, it is believed they are different people. In the game depending on how well Rei performs its possible that The Lieutenant will be promoted to Captain in the game (this happens around the same time that Misato is promoted to Major. This is done probably to fill the rank gap at NERV and has no effect on the game e.g. Player is still referred to as Sanii)
- Rei Ayanami is the pilot of Evangelion Unit-00. She is said to be fourteen years old. Of very pale complexion and rarely expressing emotions toward people, she is extremely serious about her work, defining it as her sole purpose in life. During the game, Rei's personality and attitude is likely to change and be somewhat different from her portrayal in the anime. A number of outcomes concerning her future are possible, including romantic relations with, and possibly even marriage to, the player.

Other characters in Neon Genesis Evangelion appear in the game to varying degrees:

- Gendo Ikari is the Commander of NERV, and the only person to whom Rei initially shows any emotion. Intimidating and ruthless, he is committed to destroying the Angels that periodically attack the city, at any cost. The Lieutenant receives his salary (¥20,000 per month, 40,000 With Asuka) directly from the commander.
- Ritsuko Akagi is NERV's top scientist, and the first person the Lieutenant meets in the game. She occasionally reports on Rei's condition, especially during visits to NERV.
- Misato Katsuragi is another high-ranking NERV official, and the tactician for most battles. She and the Lieutenant seem to know each other, as she shows absolutely no hesitation in passing on difficult jobs to him or asking him to lend her money.
- Shinji Ikari is the Third Child and pilot of Evangelion Unit-01, as well as the son of Gendo. He is a shy, introverted boy who harbors a deep resentment toward his father. On the other hand, he and the Lieutenant get along fairly well and sometimes exchange notes. He is the other romantic possibility for Rei.
- Asuka Langley Soryu is the Second Child pilot of Evangelion Unit-02. Part German, she is very arrogant and somewhat of a bully. In the addon for the PS2, if the player goes through certain scenes the Asuka route is unlocked. In this route, the player is made Asuka's guardian instead of Rei's.
- Hikari Horaki is the representative of Rei's homeroom class at school. Like other characters, she refers to the player by his rank. She plays a somewhat larger role in Asuka's route since she is Asuka's closest friend.
- Toji Suzuhara is one of Shinji's friends from school. He has a sister being treated in a state-of-the-art NERV hospital and often visits her. He is relatively polite to the Lieutenant, but is very antagonistic towards Asuka.
- Kensuke Aida is another of Shinji's friends and along with Toji and Shinji are referred to as the Three Stooges (San-Baka Trio). A military fan, he uses a lot of military speak when talking to the player.
- Maya Ibuki is one of the technicians of NERV. She appears to be quite familiar with the player character, often complaining about work. Should Rei develop romantic feelings for the Lieutenant, Maya expresses shock and horror (possibly due to the rather large age difference). If the player is Asuka's guardian instead, Asuka gleefully manipulates the oblivious Lieutenant into suggesting she is in a sexual relationship with him, which (unsurprisingly) horrifies Maya.

== Reception ==
The game sold 8,998 copies the week of its release.
