= Elemental Gearbolt =

1997 video game

- Developer: Alfa System (Note: Additional work by Sony Computer Entertainment Japan.)
- Publishers: JP: Sony Computer Entertainment; NA: Working Designs
- Platform: PlayStation
- Release: JP: December 11, 1997; NA: August 7, 1998
- Genre: Light gun shooter
- Modes: Single-player, multiplayer

Elemental Gearbolt (幻世虚構 精霊機導弾, Genseikyokō Seireikidōdan) is a light gun shooter video game developed by Alfa System and published by Sony Computer Entertainment for the PlayStation. It was released in Japan in December 1997 and North America in August 1998 by Working Designs.

Elemental Gearbolt received positive reviews due to its science fantasy setting, which is uncommon in light gun shooters, along with its incorporation of RPG elements, and particularly the artistry of its presentation. It features an orchestral soundtrack, and animated cutscenes directed by renowned anime director Rintaro.

Elemental Gearbolt is the first installment of the Anonymous Worldview franchise. A second installment of the franchise, titled Kōkidō Gensō Gunparade March was released in 2000, which ultimately became the first (and only, as of 2025) video game to win the Seiun Award for Best Dramatic Presentation (previously awarded to numerous works including Blade Runner, Brazil, Jurassic Park and Cowboy Bebop, and later awarded to The Lord of the Rings: The Two Towers and Macross Frontier).

== Story ==
The events of the game are framed through Tagami, a mysterious figure who travels to the world in order to investigate what caused its destruction.

The world was home to two races, Audo and Sulunkan. The Sulunkan, descendants of a fallen magical empire, were oppressed by the Audo. There are resistance groups, but none strong enough to challenge the Audo ruling class. Nell and Seana, the Sugiku (half breed) daughters of a resistance leader, meet Bel Cain, the Sugiku son of the selfish King Jabugal. Nell and Bel Cain promise to meet again. Bel Cain breaks his amulet in two and gives Nell one half as a reminder.

Years later, Bel Cain becomes crown prince, full of ambition to end the bitter class struggle. Armed with advanced technology, he starts a campaign of conquest. Nell and Seana join the Sulunkan resistance, only to be killed. Their bodies are taken back to the capital city as trophies. One of Bel Cain's technologies, a Neural Network Computer, malfunctions and initiates a self-destruct sequence. It links powerful weapons known as Holy Guns to Nell and Seana's corpses, re-animating them as Elementals with only one purpose: seek and destroy the Network.

Nell and Seana battle their way towards Owato, where Bel Cain and his older brother and subordinate Ialu are also headed. Bel Cain visits the Network, revealed to be made of mass amounts of brain-matter of the casualties of war. Bel Cain believes that the people who gave their lives to the Network will find a way to carry out his plans.

Bel Cain has vowed to avenge his mother by killing and overthrowing her murderer, King Jabugal. Ialu reports that the excavation unit at the Goate Mountains have been destroyed, the cause being one or two armored individuals mounted with incredible weapons headed towards Owato. King Jabugal tries to escape after plundering Owato of its riches. However, Bel Cain shoots the king, killing him in front of onlooking nobles. Bel Cain criticizes the people for blindly following a king who exploited his people, then tells them to cast aside the memory of King Jabugal and bow down before him. The nobles cooperate.

Nell and Seana fly into Owato and make their way to the inner depths of the palace. Ialu urges the prince to retreat, but Bel Cain decides to stay, remembering a younger Nell telling him that his strength of character will serve him well. Ialu has the royal guards escort him to safety by force.

Nell and Seana encounter Reftraseal, a creature resembling a dragon. Once Reftraseal is destroyed, an entity resembling Nell's elemental appearance jumps out of Reftraseal. After a battle, the entity is destroyed. The entity is revealed to be piloted by Bel Cain. Mortally wounded, he laments how his carefully set plans and the sacrifices of his subordinates have proven fruitless. Nell approaches. The Prince recognizes her by the amulet she is still wearing. Reunited with his childhood friend, unaware that Nell's corpse is controlled by the Holy Gun, the Prince dies with a peaceful expression.

Nell carries the corpse of Bel Cain with her to the Network. She fires her elemental gun at the Network, destroying it. Having completed the task Nell was reanimated for, a blue light envelops Nell and Bel Cain, who perish together. Bel Cain speaks to the player: "One day, all will put away the destructive desires of self, striving only to create a world without barriers. I failed. You must succeed."

Journal entries written by Tagami reveal that Tagami came from another dimension and gave the Network access to the holy guns, anticipating the malfunction of the Network to mount the holy guns to Nell and Seana's bodies. The life expectancy of their bodies was limited to 24 hours, the exact amount of time needed for the holy gun to destroy Bel Cain's kingdom. Due to an accident with the dimensional gate, Tagami's return to her world is impossible. She enters cryogenic suspension until the gate can be repaired. She makes a private note, reading "Farewell, Yuri. I shall always love you."

Centuries later, Tagami finds Bel Cain's half of the pendant.

== Gameplay ==
As is the norm with light gun shooters, the action in Elemental Gearbolt takes place from a first-person perspective, and the pace of the game and rate of enemy occurrence is completely preset. The player is only required to aim and shoot with the light gun. Most light gun games require the player to reload as ammunition is expended, but Elemental Gearbolt does not, since both the player characters and their weapons are magical. Instead, the game limits the speed at which the player can fire. The player can switch freely between three types of attacks—Blaze Phoenix, a basic, high powered shot; Thunder Tiger, a spread shot; and Water Snake, a rapid shot.

At the conclusion of each stage the player has the opportunity to select percentages of the score for the stage to allocate towards bonus points or experience. As in an RPG, the player characters gain levels by accruing experience, and thus grow more powerful and are better able to take damage. Score determines rank, and in the year following the game's North American release it was used to participate in contests sponsored by Working Designs.

The game supports all of the licensed PlayStation light guns, as well as the PlayStation Analog Joystick and the Dual Analog Controller.

== Music ==
The official soundtrack features a 24½-minute drama track in Japanese and 19 original score cues performed by a full orchestra. It was released by First Smile Entertainment on January 21, 1998, in Japan. Its catalogue ID is FSCA-10030 and the original price in Japan was 2,548¥. Kei Wakakusa composed and arranged the score.

== Promotion ==
Some winners of Working Designs' contests for Elemental Gearbolt in the 1998 E3 at the Georgia World Congress Center received 'Assassin Case' prizes that contained gold-plated GunCon light guns. These Assassin Cases are among the most rare and prized collectibles from the PlayStation era.

== Reception ==
Reception

Aggregate scores
Aggregator	Score
GameRankings	79.71%
Metacritic	76/100

Review scores
Publication	Score
AllGame	3.5/5
Electronic Gaming Monthly	8/10
Game Informer	8.25/10
GameSpot	7.5/10
IGN	8.3/10
Official U.S. PlayStation Magazine	4/5
PlayStation: The Official Magazine	3/5
Dengeki PlayStation	80/100, 90/100
Game Buyer	5/5
Gamers' Republic	B−
PSExtreme	85%
Silicon Magazine	85/100
Weekly TV Gamer	7/10, 8/10, 6/10

According to Famitsu, Elemental Gearbolt sold approximately 16,348 copies during its lifetime in Japan. The game received "generally favorable" reviews, holding a rating of 79.71% based on seven reviews according to review aggregators Metacritic and GameRankings. GamePro's Four-Eyed Dragon considered it a "strong and enjoyable light-gun shooter with an unusual RPG flair", but saw the pixelated polygonal graphics and short duration as negative points. In retrospectives, Elemental Gearbolt has been listed among the best light-gun games on the PlayStation by Retro Gamer, Time Extension, and GamesRadar+.

== See also ==
- Gunparade March
- Shikigami no Shiro
- Mars Daybreak
