= Linda Cube =

1995 video game

- Developers: Alfa System; MARS Corporation (Note: Additional work for the PlayStation version by Sony Computer Entertainment Japan.)
- Publishers: NEC (PCE); Sony Computer Entertainment (PS1); ASCII Corporation (Saturn)
- Designer: Shoji Masuda
- Platforms: PC Engine CD, PlayStation, Saturn
- Release: JP: 1995 (PCE); JP: 1997 (PS1); JP: 1998 (Saturn)
- Genre: Role-playing
- Mode: Single-player

Linda Cube (alternatively Linda³) is a 1995 role-playing video game developed by Alfa System and MARS Corporation and published by NEC for the PC Engine CD. A port for the PlayStation was released in 1997 by Sony Computer Entertainment as Linda Cube Again. Another port for the Sega Saturn was released in 1998 as Linda Cube Kanzenban (Note: "Kanzenban" means "complete edition"). An English fan translation of the PlayStation version was released in 2024. Still in 2024, Biglobe, owner of NEC Home Electronics IPs, sold the rights of Linda³ to Meteorise, which is Alfa System's parent company; though the franchise still is co-owned between Meteorise, MARS and Kadokawa Corporation.

== Plot ==
The game is set on the planet Neo Kenya, where a meteor is set to impact in eight years wiping out all life. The protagonist Ken Challenger and his girlfriend Linda are tasked with catching 30, 50 and 100 animals of both genders, depending on the scenario, and thereafter boarding an Ark that was sent by God to preserve the planet's lifeforms.

== Reception ==
Reception

Review scores
| Publication | Score |
|---|---|
| Famitsu | 8/10, 6/10, 7/10, 8/10 (Saturn) |
| Joypad | 10% (PS1) |
| RPGamer | 4.0/5 (PS1) |
| Dengeki PlayStation | 75/100, 80/100, 80/100, 85/100 |
| Saturn Fan | 24/30 |
| Sega Saturn Magazine (JP) | 24/30 |

Linda Cube has been noted as one of the most bizarre Japanese role-playing games. Joypad liked the characters and called the first hour of the game "quite exciting" but said the graphics are ugly and combat extremely boring. In a retrospective review, RPGamer praised the voice acting and atmosphere but criticized the lack of story.
