= Alfa System =

Japanese video game developer

- Type: Subsidiary
- Industry: Video games
- Founded: January 1988
- Headquarters: Kumamoto City, Japan,
- Number of employees: 60 (2016)
- Parent: Meteorise (2021–present)
- Website: http://www.alfasystem.net/

Alfa System is a Japanese video game developer and publisher. The company was founded in 1988. In their early years Alfa System developed for NEC consoles with Hudson Soft and other publishers. They later worked closely with Sony Computer Entertainment and Bandai Namco Entertainment on the Tales series. In February 2021, Alfa System was acquired by Meteorise.

== Games ==
Title	Release date	Platform(s)	Publisher
NO.RI.KO	December 4, 1988	PC Engine	Hudson Soft
Fighting Street	December 4, 1988	CD-ROM²	Hudson Soft
Susano-o Densetsu	April 27, 1989	PC Engine	Hudson Soft
Wonder Boy III: Monster Lair	August 31, 1989	CD-ROM²	Hudson Soft
Ys I & II	December 21, 1989	CD-ROM²	Hudson Soft
Cyber Core	March 9, 1990	PC Engine, Sharp X68000	Information Global Service
Shanghai II	April 13, 1990	CD-ROM²	Hudson Soft
Download	June 22, 1990	PC Engine	NEC Corporation
Daimakaimura (Note: The conversion itself was done at Hudson Soft, but the person who actually ported Daimakaimura was an employee of Alfa System.)	July 27, 1990	PC Engine SuperGrafx	NEC Corporation
Sinistron	December 14, 1990	PC Engine	Information Global Service
Ys III: Wanderers from Ys	March 22, 1991	CD-ROM²	Hudson Soft
Download 2	March 29, 1991	CD-ROM²	NEC Corporation
Tricky Kick	July 6, 1991	PC Engine	Information Global Service
Populous	1991	PC Engine	Hudson Soft
Psychic Storm	March 19, 1992	CD-ROM²	Laser Soft
Exile: Wicked Phenomenon	September 22, 1992	CD-ROM²	Telenet Japan
Kiaidan 00	October 23, 1992	CD-ROM²	Telenet Japan
Dragon Slayer: The Legend of Heroes II	December 23, 1992	CD-ROM²	Hudson Soft
Quiz Caravan: Cult Q	May 28, 1993	CD-ROM²	Hudson Soft
Godzilla: Battle Legends	December 3, 1993	TurboDuo	Toho
Art of Fighting	March 26, 1994	CD-ROM²	Hudson Soft
The Dynastic Hero	May 20, 1994	CD-ROM²	Hudson Soft
Godzilla: Monster War	December 9, 1994	Super NES	Toho
Emerald Dragon	July 28, 1995	Super NES	MediaWorks
Linda³	October 9, 1995	CD-ROM²	NEC Corporation
Dream Change: Kokin-chan no Fashion Party	1995	Casio Loopy	Casio Computer
Wan Wan Aijō Monogatari	1995	Casio Loopy	Casio Computer
Project Horned Owl	August 31, 1996	PlayStation	Sony Computer Entertainment
Karma: Curse of the 12 Caves	November 22, 1996	PlayStation, Sega Saturn	Patra
Next King: Koi no Sennen Oukoku	June 27, 1997	PlayStation, Sega Saturn	Bandai
Linda³ Again	September 25, 1997	PlayStation	Sony Computer Entertainment
Elemental Gearbolt	December 11, 1997	PlayStation	Sony Computer Entertainment
Lunar: Silver Star Story Complete	May 28, 1998	PlayStation	Kadokawa Shoten
Linda³: Kanzenban	June 18, 1998	Sega Saturn	ASCII Corporation
Ore no Shikabane wo Koete Yuke	June 17, 1999	PlayStation	Sony Computer Entertainment
Gunparade March	September 20, 2000	PlayStation	Sony Computer Entertainment
Abarenbou Princess	November 29, 2001	PlayStation 2	Kadokawa Shoten
Shikigami no Shiro	March 14, 2002	Arcade, Xbox, PlayStation 2	Taito (Xbox version: Mediaquest)
Shikigami no Shiro EX	August 8, 2002	Microsoft Windows	Sourcenext
Tales of the World: Narikiri Dungeon 2	October 25, 2002	Game Boy Advance	Bandai
Shikigami no Shiro Evolution	December 19, 2002	Xbox	Mediaquest
Castle Shikigami 2	October 23, 2003	Arcade, GameCube, PlayStation 2, Dreamcast, Xbox, Microsoft Windows	Taito (Arcade & PS2)
Neon Genesis Evangelion 2	November 20, 2003	PlayStation 2	Bandai
Castle Shikigami 2	January 29, 2004	PlayStation 2	Taito
Vampire Panic	June 24, 2004	PlayStation 2	Sammy
Tales of the World: Narikiri Dungeon 3	January 6, 2005	Game Boy Advance	Namco
Shikigami no Shiro: Nanayozuki Gensoukyoku	August 18, 2005	PlayStation 2	Kids Station
Gunparade Orchestra: Shiro no Shou	January 12, 2006	PlayStation 2	Sony Computer Entertainment
Gunparade Orchestra: Midori no Shou	March 30, 2006	PlayStation 2	Sony Computer Entertainment
Neon Genesis Evangelion 2 -Another Cases-	April 27, 2006	PlayStation Portable	Bandai
Gunparade Orchestra: Ao no Shou	July 20, 2006	PlayStation 2	Sony Computer Entertainment
Castle of Shikigami III	September 29, 2006	Arcade, Microsoft Windows	Taito, Cyberfront (Windows version)
Tales of the World: Radiant Mythology	December 21, 2006	PlayStation Portable	Namco Bandai Games
Tales of Destiny 2	February 15, 2007	PlayStation Portable	Namco Bandai Games
Tales of Innocence	December 6, 2007	Nintendo DS	Namco Bandai Games
Castle of Shikigami III	December 13, 2007	Nintendo Wii	Arc System Works
Phantasy Star Portable	July 31, 2008	PlayStation Portable	Sega
Tales of the World: Radiant Mythology 2	January 29, 2009	PlayStation Portable	Namco Bandai Games
Phantasy Star Portable 2	December 3, 2009	PlayStation Portable	Sega
Tales of the World: Radiant Mythology 3	February 10, 2011	PlayStation Portable	Namco Bandai Games
Phantasy Star Portable 2 Infinity	February 24, 2011	PlayStation Portable	Sega
Oreshika: Tainted Bloodlines	July 17, 2014	PlayStation Vita	Sony Computer Entertainment
Sisters Royale	June 14, 2018	Microsoft Windows, Nintendo Switch, PlayStation 4, Xbox One	Alfa System
