= Shikigami no Shiro =

2001 video game

- Japanese PS2 cover art
- Developer: Alfa System
- Publishers: Arcade; Taito; XS Games; MediaQuest; Sourcenext
- Platforms: Arcade, PlayStation 2, Xbox, Windows
- Release: Arcade: JP: 2001; Xbox: JP: March 14, 2002; PlayStation 2: JP: June 27, 2002; NA: March 19, 2003; EU: 2003; Windows: JP: August 8, 2002; WW: June 16, 2017; (EX); Xbox: JP: December 19, 2002; (Evolution); PlayStation 2: JP: July 29, 2004; (Re-release)
- Genre: Scrolling shooter
- Modes: Single-player, multiplayer
- Arcade system: Taito G-NET

Shikigami no Shiro (式神の城, lit. Castle of Shikigami), released in North America and Europe under the title of Mobile Light Force 2 and in some PAL regions as MLF2 - Mobile Light Force 2, is a 2001 shoot 'em up developed by Alfa System and is the first game in the Shikigami no Shiro series. It was originally released as an arcade game and later ported to the PlayStation 2, Xbox, and Microsoft Windows. The game was titled Shikigami no Shiro Evolution (式神の城 Evolution) for its revised version for Xbox, which was then ported to Windows as Shikigami no Shiro EX (式神の城 EX).

When localized, publisher XS Games re-titled the game as a sequel to Mobile Light Force, but in reality the games are unrelated. Mobile Light Force is known as Gunbird in Japan, and was not developed by Alfa System.

In 2017, Degica Games localized the series, with the first game released on Microsoft Windows via Steam on June 16 as Castle of Shikigami.

== Gameplay ==
When holding down the attack button, the player moves at slower speed, and all on-screen items are automatically retrieved. The player character is invulnerable when a special attack is in effect. When the player character is close to an enemy bullet, the points gained from destroying enemies and retrieving items is multiplied by a factor based on the distance between the bullet and the player character's center. The closer they are to the bullet, the higher the scoring. When destroying enemy in shikigami mode, the multiplier also applies to the number of items dropped by enemy and all items dropped by the enemy are automatically retrieved.

The Xbox release adds Practice mode, Gallery, and Replay mode, while the PlayStation 2 release adds Practice mode, Gallery, and Side Story modes. Windows includes I.R. mode and vertical screen layout from the arcade game. The North American and European releases of the game removed the screen rotation mode and all in-game plot.

== Plot ==
In July 2005, a string of serial murders take place in Tokyo. All the victims are female and killed by external injury. The killings take place within 20 hours. On July 21, the 31st victim is found. The police force classify the case as special crime #568, and begin to seek investigators from occult sources. On July 23, there is a 32nd victim.

== Characters ==
Playable characters:

- Kohtarou Kuga (玖珂 光太郎, Kuga Koutarou)
- Sayo Yuuki (結城 小夜, Yuuki Sayo)
- Gennojo Hyuga (日向 玄乃丈, Hyuuga Gennoujou)
- Fumiko Odette Vanstein (ふみこ・オゼット・ヴァンシュタイン, Fumiko Ozetto Vanshutain)
- Daejeong Kim (金 大正, Kimu Dejon)
- ???? (Tagami, from Elemental Gearbolt)

Bosses:

- Miyoko Aku (悪 美代子, Aku Miyoko) (Stage 1)
- Fujishima Juu (醜 藤島, Juu Fujishima) (Stage 2)
- Hiroshi Aku (悪 浩志, Aku Hiroshi) (Stage 3)
- Bauman Aku (悪 バウマン, Aku Bauman) (Stage 4)
- Shoujo (少女, Shoujo) (Stage 5)
- Zanryuu Shinen (残留 思念, Zanryuu Shinen) (Stage 5–3)

== Shikigami no Shiro Evolution ==
Shikigami no Shiro Evolution was released in two separate versions, a red (紅, kurenai) version which included a database containing character gallery, trailers, and unused voices, and a blue (藍, ai) version which included developer videos. Both versions have improved enemy AI, new characters, a vertical screen mode, and the new Evolution Mode game mode.

== Manga ==
A comic version was written by Tooru Zekuu (aka Shinji Takano) and illustrated by Yuuna Takanagi, serialized in the monthly Magazine Z. Three volumes were published under Kodansha's Magazine Z KC label.

== Reception ==
Reception

Review scores
Publication	Score	
Publication	PS2	Xbox
AllGame	2/5	N/A
Edge	N/A	7/10
GameSpot	6.8/10	N/A
GameSpy	3/5	N/A
Official U.S. PlayStation Magazine	3.5/5	N/A

In Japan, Game Machine listed Shikigami no Shiro on their November 1, 2001 issue as being the fourth most-successful arcade game of the month.

The PlayStation 2 version received "mixed" reviews according to video game review aggregator Metacritic.
