= Wonder Boy (video game) =

1986 video game

- Arcade flyer, featuring Wonder Boy, Tina, King, and several enemies
- Developer: Escape
- Publisher: Sega: C64, CPC, ZX Spectrum Activision
- Director: Ryuichi Nishizawa
- Designer: Ryuichi Nishizawa
- Composer: Ryuichi Nishizawa
- Series: Wonder Boy
- Platforms: Arcade, SG-1000, Master System, Commodore 64, Amstrad CPC, ZX Spectrum, Game Gear, mobile phone
- Release: April 21, 1986: Arcade; JP: April 21, 1986; NA: July 1986 SG-1000; JP: 1986 Master System; JP: March 22, 1987; NA: June 1987; EU: 1987 C64; NA: 1987; EU: 1987 CPC; EU: 1987 ZX Spectrum; EU: 1987; EU: 1988 (budget) Game Gear; JP: December 8, 1990; NA/EU: June 1991 Mobile; JP: April 8, 2004
- Genre: Platform
- Mode: Single-player
- Arcade system: Sega System 1

Wonder Boy (Note: Japanese: ワンダーボーイ, Hepburn: Wandā Bōi) is a 1986 platform game developed by Escape and published by Sega for arcades. It was later ported to the SG-1000, Master System and Game Gear video game consoles by Sega, and to the ZX Spectrum, Commodore 64 and Amstrad CPC home computers by Activision. The game is also known as Super Wonder Boy (スーパーワンダーボーイ, Sūpā Wandā Bōi) for its Sega Mark III release in Japan and Revenge of Drancon for its Game Gear release in North America. A high definition remake of the game, titled Wonder Boy Returns, was developed by CFK and released on Steam on October 12, 2016.

It was the first in the long-running Wonder Boy series of games and was followed up by five sequels, Wonder Boy in Monster Land, Wonder Boy III: Monster Lair, Wonder Boy III: The Dragon's Trap, Wonder Boy in Monster World and Monster World IV. The game was also adapted by Hudson Soft as Adventure Island, which spawned its own series of games.

== Gameplay ==
The titular Wonder Boy (Note: Later named Tom-Tom in the Master System version, known simply as "Boy" in the Japanese versions) is a tribal caveman-like boy whose girlfriend Tina (Note: Tina was later renamed Tanya in the Master System version) has been captured by the dark King (known as Drancon in the Game Gear version). The player must guide the Wonder Boy through seven "areas", each consisting of four "rounds".

Wonder Boy can arm himself with a stone hatchet, which he can throw at oncoming foes, a skateboard with which he can rush through the levels and temporary protection by an angel which allows him to destroy foes by simply running into them. All of the aforementioned power-ups are obtained by breaking open eggs. These eggs can also contain unpleasant surprises – curses which cause him to lose vitality more quickly than usual, and poisonous mushrooms which reduce Wonder Boy's vitality in one go, albeit replacing the original fruit such as apples and bananas with higher scoring desserts such as cake slices and ice cream sundaes. The player must remain aware of the vitality meter, which constantly runs down at a steady pace and can only be refilled by collecting food throughout the level. There is also one doll to collect in each level, which doubles the bonus points awarded at the end of the level. If all 28 dolls are collected, then a bonus eighth area will be unlocked.

At the end of every "area", Wonder Boy will encounter an incarnation of the chief antagonist as a boss character. Once defeated, the mighty lord's mask flies off and transforms into an item such as a tea cup or a piece of fruit, prior to the lord making his escape. A two-player alternating mode is available where each player takes turn whenever the other one loses a life.

== Plot ==
In the far past, a Boy is attacked by the Evil King. He manages to escape, but The King kidnaps his girlfriend, Tina. The Boy explores the island and avoids the Grim Reaper, who has set out under the command of The King to lead him to his doom. After questing for ages, The Boy confronts The King and saves Tina. After returning home, The Boy is heralded as a "Wonder Boy".

== Arcade hardware ==
The game ran on Sega's proprietary System 1 hardware, based on a Z80 processor running at 4 MHz. Audio was provided by two 2 MHz SN76496 chips with a 4 MHz Z80 co-processor. The graphics were provided by a raster video unit at a resolution of 256 x 224.

The game required a cabinet that provided a two-axis joystick and three input buttons – one to act as a start button, two as gameplay buttons.

== Ports ==
=== SG-1000 ===
The first home version of Wonder Boy was released exclusively in Japan for the SG-1000 (Sega's first video game console) during the same year the arcade version was released. The game was released in a "My Card" format, which required the "Card Catcher" peripheral. Because of the severe hardware differences, the game was remade completely for the SG-1000 with an all new set of stages. Certain enemies, stages, and items were also omitted, such as the skateboard.

=== Master System and Game Gear ===
The version of Wonder Boy for the Master System and Game Gear was a direct port of the arcade title, with some minor reductions to accommodate the more limited hardware. In Japan, the Sega Mark III version was entitled Super Wonder Boy to differentiate it from the previous port, although the overseas releases dropped the word "Super" from the title. The Game Gear port in the United States was entitled Revenge of Drancon.

The graphics were lifted straight from the arcade version, but the HUD was restricted to a simple vitality bar – the score and number of lives were displayed prior to starting the level. The sound was modified slightly to adapt it to the more limited audio hardware. The graphics were brighter. The controls were modified slightly to make it possible to only perform a high jump when the run button was pressed, whereas it was possible in the arcade version to perform one simply by being in motion when the jump button was pressed.

However, the most important aspect that differentiated it from its arcade counterpart was the addition of "areas". Wonder Boy for the Master System and Game Gear had nine areas; this included all seven areas from the arcade original plus two new areas created specifically for this version. The new areas featured unique level designs different than the rest of the game. These two areas were dubbed as the fourth area and eighth area in the game. This resulted in a modification on the numbering for the areas lifted from the arcade original (for example, what was the fourth area on the arcade version became the fifth area on the SMS/GG version).

As with the arcade version, collecting all dolls in the game would reveal an extra "area" which, in this case, would be the tenth area.

=== Home computers ===
The license to produce the home computer versions of Wonder Boy was awarded to Activision, who produced versions of the game for the ZX Spectrum, Commodore 64 and Amstrad CPC in 1987. The game was true in spirit to the original, although the levels beyond level 4 differed to allow for the necessary multi-load system. The first round of each area was always a forest, the second an ocean, the third a cave and the fourth a forest at nighttime (the C64 had round 1 at night time and round 4 during the day). This was not the case in the console and arcade versions, in which the areas provided more variation (although based on these same four themes). The Amstrad CPC version contained the graphics used in the C64 conversion, but the sound from the Spectrum conversion.

Some Spectrum versions were afflicted with a bug that prevented the game from preloading all four levels in 128K mode – the fourth level's graphics would not load correctly, and it would be impossible for the player to move before the game crashed and the computer rebooted within around three seconds. As a result, 128K owners were forced to boot into 48K mode to run the game, and did not enjoy the benefit of having all levels preloaded as was designed. Under 48K mode, however, the 128K music still worked.

=== Mobile ===
In 2004, Sega released a pixel-perfect conversion of the game designed for mobile phones.

=== Emulated re-releases ===
On March 31, 2008, Wonder Boy was made available for play on the Wii's Virtual Console in North America. Japan and Europe got the game a week later. The game is available for 500 Wii points, and is an emulation of the Sega Master System version.

The game was released by Hamster Corporation as part of their Arcade Archives series for the PlayStation 4 in 2014; for unknown reasons, Sega and LAT dropped involvement with the series, leading to the port getting neither an international release nor a Nintendo Switch version.

Wonder Boy was rereleased in 2022 as part of Wonder Boy Collection for the Nintendo Switch and PlayStation 4 which includes its versions on arcade, Master System, SG-1000 and Game Gear.

=== Returns series ===
A high-definition remake of the game, titled Wonder Boy Returns, was developed by CFK and released on Windows via Steam on October 12, 2016, later releasing on PlayStation 4 on March 30, 2017. A limited run physical edition of the PS4 version was released by Strictly Limited Games on January 27, 2019.

An enhanced version, Wonder Boy Returns Remix, was released on Nintendo Switch on May 23, 2019.

=== Modified ports ===
Escape had a licensing arrangement whereby it owned the rights to the game design, but Sega retained the Wonder Boy trademark. Because of this, Escape teamed up with Hudson Soft to produce a conversion of the game for the NES, under a new license. To get around the licensing issue, Hudson Soft had the title changed which resulted into Adventure Island. Although Hudson could have featured the generic boy from Wonder Boy as the protagonist of Adventure Island, it instead created a brand new character, Master Higgins, intended to be a caricature of Takahashi Meijin. Since Adventure Island is based on the arcade version of Wonder Boy, it does not contain any of the original levels found in the Master System or Game Gear ports. The bonus stage that was reserved for collecting all the dolls in Wonder Boy is integrated in this game as a regular area.

In this arrangement, once again, Hudson Soft retained the rights to the character and name, allowing the company to continue to produce future games using the Adventure Island name and characters. These sequels are not based on the Wonder Boy sequels.

Hudson released Champion Takahashi's Adventure Island for the MSX. This version featured Master Higgins as the main character but retained the music of Wonder Boy, unlike the NES Adventure Island which had a completely different soundtrack.

Escape repeated the same kind of task by converting Sega's 1991 beat 'em up arcade Riot City, into Hudson Soft's 1992 TurboGrafx-CD title Riot Zone.

Through its 2012 absorption of Hudson Soft, Konami currently owns the rights to the Adventure Island series.

== Reception ==
Reception

Review scores
Publication	Score				
Publication	Arcade	C64	Master System	mobile	ZX
Crash					43%
Computer and Video Games	Positive	7/10	80%		
IGN				7.1/10	
Sinclair User					8/10
Your Sinclair					7/10
Zzap!64		52%			
Computer Entertainer			7/8		

=== Arcade ===
Wonder Boy was a commercial success in arcades. In Japan, Game Machine listed Wonder Boy as the fifth most successful table arcade unit of May 1986. It became Japan's tenth highest-grossing table arcade game during the latter half of 1986. It appeared at number two on Euromax's nationwide UK arcade chart in 1987, just below Capcom's 1942 at number one.

The arcade game was critically acclaimed upon release. In Computer and Video Games, the game was lauded by reviewer Clare Edgeley for its detailed, bright, colorful graphics and simple, addictive gameplay, whilst some criticism was leveled towards the lack of variety. She also stated it reminds her of Super Mario Bros. though "not as complicated but just as playable." Writers now note that both games share a common ancestor in Pac-Land.

=== Ports ===
The Master System port received positive reviews from Computer Entertainer and Computer and Video Games.

Amstrad Action awarded the Amstrad CPC version of the game 68% on its original release in 1987, and 62% on its re-release three years later. Computing With the Amstrad awarded the game 88% on its original release.

Reviewing the ZX Spectrum version, CRASH remained unconvinced, citing technical shortcomings, including poor character-based scrolling, considerable slowdown, and confusion induced by the monochrome display. On its re-release, while quoting the aforementioned problems, the reviewer was willing to overlook them, highlighting the quality of the sprites and the fun offered by the game, and offering it 69%. Sinclair User was the most enthusiastic about the game, offering it 8 out of 10 on its original release, and 72% on its re-release. Your Sinclair offered 7 out of 10 on its original release and 67% on its re-release.

The C64 version shares the same graphics as the Amstrad CPC version; unlike the ZX Spectrum and Amstrad versions, however, the game featured smooth horizontal scrolling. CVG and Your Commodore reviewed the game reasonably well on initial release, with Your Commodore remarking that it was an excellent arcade conversion but feeling it was lacking in originality, and CVG describing it as addictive, whilst Zzap were much more critical, rating the game 52% and criticising the poor sound and labelling the actual arcade game itself as 'ordinary'.

IGN awarded the mobile version 7.1 out of 10, praising its accuracy to the arcade original.
