= The Adventure of Little Ralph =

1999 video game

- Cover art by Shūichirō Ōtomo
- Developer: New Corporation
- Publisher: New Corporation
- Producer: Yasuyuki Narushima
- Designer: Ryūta Aoyagi
- Programmers: Hiroyuki Murata; Katsuyoshi Yamaki; Kazuya Furukawa
- Artists: Aki Wataya; Hiromi Ōi; Kenichi Orito
- Writer: Kōji Maekawa
- Composers: Hideki Satō; Hiroshi Kuronuma; Naoki Tsuchiya
- Platform: PlayStation
- Release: JP: June 3, 1999
- Genre: Platform
- Modes: Single-player, multiplayer

The Adventure of Little Ralph (Note: Japanese: ちっぽけラルフの大冒険, Hepburn: Chippoke Ralph no Daibōken) is a 1999 platform video game developed and published by New Corporation for the PlayStation. It was released only in Japan.

The game's story focuses on Ralph, a man who has been turned into a child who now must save a damsel in distress. Reviewers praised the game for its high quality graphics, music, and difficulty.

== Gameplay ==
Platforming segment

The Adventure of Little Ralph is a two-dimensional side scrolling action game. The player takes on the role of Ralph as he pursues the demons who have cursed him and abducted his friend, Leticia.

There are a total of eight stages in the game, and they include locations such as a desert, an iceberg, and a flying battleship.. There are two distinct difficulty ranks, Easy and Normal: selecting Easy results in the game concluding after the Ice Stronghold stage, with a different ending. Selecting Normal is required to play all eight stages and view the true ending.

As a child, Ralph's abilities are limited. He can run, jump and climb ropes and ladders. He bears the Holy Sword, with which he can send enemies flying or perform a downward strike. Power-ups extend the sword's reach, provide projectile attacks or grant a shield that can protect Ralph from damage once. Taking damage without a shield or running out of time causes Ralph to lose a life and all of his power-ups.

The player can collect fruit to increase points, which will appear as the player moves through stages. Alternate and secret paths provide more fruit or treasure to collect. Collecting points, hearts or icons of Ralph grants extra lives. If Ralph loses all his lives, the game is over and the player's score is reset, though they may continue as many times as they wish. The game has an emphasis on earning high scores, which had become less popular in gaming at the time.

During certain boss fights, Ralph temporarily returns to adult size, and the controls change to that of a fighting game similar to Street Fighter II. Ralph gains new abilities, including a block, high jump, evasive dash and several special attacks with the Holy Sword, executed by using motion inputs. Completing the game unlocks a two-player versus mode, where players can play as Ralph or any of the game's bosses.

== Plot ==
Demons have invaded the world of humans. Unable to resist, humanity places its faith in the Holy Sword, a legendary weapon said to appear when the world is in danger. When a young man named Ralph attempts to stand up to the demons, their leader, Valgo, casts a spell that turns him into a helpless child. Ralph's friend Leticia attempts to protect him from the demons using her magical powers, but is abducted by Valgo. The Holy Sword then appears before Ralph and tasks him with wielding it to save the world from demons.

Ralph's pursuit leads him to a lost continent which the demons are using as their base of operations. In the Ice Stronghold, he confronts and defeats Valgo, but remains trapped as a child. Valgo reveals that the demons are working with a human magician, Destarroza, who has Leticia captive in the flying Broaver Castle and that Ralph can only break the spell by defeating Destarroza.

Ralph infiltrates Broaver Castle to confront Destarroza, who reveals that Leticia is a descendant of the ancient civilisation that created the castle. He intends to control the castle through Leticia in order to conquer the world. Ralph defeats Destarroza, breaking the spell and freeing Leticia, who uses her powers to move the castle away from the world's surface before it self-destructs. The Holy Sword shields the pair from the explosion and returns them to their home.

== Development ==
New Corp was formed by out of the arcade game center community in Kashiwazaki, Niigata Japan. They released Boxer's Road, a boxing game for the PlayStation in 1995.

Development on the game began in 1991, initially for the X68000 home computer before moving to the PlayStation. Designer Aoyagi Ryuta cites Wonder Boy, Rastan, and Quartet as influences. The motivation of the dev team at the time, was that platformers were already starting to wane, and they took it as a challenge to make a great platforming game.

The music was composed by Hiroki Kuroonuma, Naoki Tsuchiya, and Hideki Sato. The score was made collaboratively, and aimed to evoke sounds from the 80's. Tsuchiya did all of the sound effects himself.

When The Adventure of Little Ralph was released, it was one of the few two-dimensional games released during that time period, and there was far more interest in three-dimensional games. Other two-dimensional games such as Skullmonkeys had sold poorly, and Castlevania: Symphony of the Night had relatively low sales.

== Releases ==
The game was released on June 3, 1999 in Japan only for the Sony PlayStation. It retailed for 4800 yen. To promote the game, a high score contest was held at release. First place won an IMac, second won a Sony MiniDisc radio and cassette player, and third won a MiniDisc walkman. Since its release, physical copies of the game has been known to fetch as high as US$200 on online auction sites such as eBay. In 2014, Eurogamer noted the price could be £80 - £100.

The game was later released on PlayStation Network for the PlayStation 3 and PlayStation Portable in Japan on July 26, 2007 and was published by Ertain Corporation. The soundtrack to the game was released in 2009 by EGG Music.

== Reception ==
Reception

Review scores
| Publication | Score |
|---|---|
| Famitsu | 26/40 |
| Gamers' Republic | B- |
| Planet PlayStation | 75/100 |
| Gamers | 14/20 |

Four reviewers for Weekly Famitsu gave the game 26 points out of 40. Reviewers noted the game's difficulty, saying it was suitable for those who wished for an older style video game. One reviewer compared it to Famicom titles.

Gamers' Republic magazine game the game a B−. They noted the minecart section was similar to the one in Hermie Hopperhead. The reviewer praised the 2D graphics, and challenging gameplay which was a contrast to many modern 3D games. The reviewer noted the only flaw in the game was its short length, but still recommended it to import for fans of 2D side scrolling games. Gamers' Republic later listed the game in their 1999 Video Game Buyers Guide and Y2K Preview as one of the best games to import from Japan that year along with such games as, Bangai-O, Neon Genesis Evangelion, Pepsiman, Robot Dandy, and Internal Section.

Planet PlayStation gave it a score of 75 out of 100.

Spanish magazine Loading praised the game.

== See also ==
- Magical Pop'n
