= Riot City =

1991 video game

- Title screen of Riot City
- Developer: Westone
- Publisher: Sega
- Designers: Naoki Hoshizaki (director, main programmer)
- Composer: Jin Watanabe
- Platform: Arcade
- Release: 1991
- Genre: Beat 'em up
- Modes: Single-player, multiplayer
- Arcade system: Sega System 16B hardware

Riot City (ライオットシティ) is a 1991 2D beat 'em up arcade game developed by Westone and published by Sega.

== Plot ==
The plot begins when narcotics agents Paul and Bobby are committed to putting an end to the drug syndicate known as "MID". MID's secret hideout is located on Riot Island, an island full of uninhabited ruins with people moved inside of it while turning it into a slum. Buildings include apartments, hospitals, factories and even a casino. During their heavy research on MID, they unexpectedly received a phone call from MID. When Paul heard the voice of his girlfriend Catherine crying for help on the phone while being hung up without explaining, he assumed she's been abducted, making him and Bobby head toward Riot Island and save her.

== Gameplay ==
Riot City resembles Capcom's 1989 arcade hit, Final Fight, which is an archetypal side scrolling beat-em-up game. Player one controls Paul the blond-haired with balanced fighting skills, and Bobby the tough, but slow break-dancer from left to right through each level (most of which are split into three or more scenes), fighting with the enemy characters who appear, until they reach a confrontation with a stronger boss character at the end of the level. Once that boss is beaten, the players automatically move on to the next stage. Enemies appear from both sides of the screen, and the players must defeat all of them to progress. If the players try to simply travel through the levels without fighting, the screen will stop scrolling until all current enemies have been defeated, before allowing the players to continue progress. Enemies may move outside the confines of the screen, but players may not. Unlike Final Fight, there are no weapons to pick up along the way, but players will only pick up items for points.

== Soundtrack ==
Riot City Original Soundtracks

Soundtrack album by Jin Watanabe
- Released: February 27, 2009
- Recorded: Unknown
- Genre: Video game soundtrack
- Label: EGG Music

A soundtrack album, Riot City Original Soundtracks was released by EGG Music, a division of D4 Enterprise, on February 27, 2009. It contains every background music and sound effect from the game, which were composed by Jin Watanabe, who also composed Monster World IV along with Shinichi Sakamoto.

Riot City
No.	Title	Length
1.	"Adobatai Demo"
2.	"Title (VOICE)"
3.	"Game Start"
4.	"Round 1‐1"
5.	"Round 1‐2 & 4‐1"
6.	"Round Boss & Round 3‐1 & 5‐2"
7.	"Round Clear"
8.	"Round 2‐1 & 4‐2"
9.	"Round 2‐2"
10.	"Round 2‐3"
11.	"Round 2 & 3 Boss"
12.	"Round 3-2 & Round 4 Boss"
13.	"Round 4‐3"
14.	"Round 5‐1"
15.	"Round 5 Boss"
16.	"Ending"
17.	"Name Entry"
18.	"Game Over"
19.	"Continue"
20.	"Unused Tune"
21.	"SE & VOICE"

== Riot Zone ==
While Westone decided to create a modified version of Sega's Wonder Boy for Hudson Soft as Adventure Island for the NES, they also took Riot City, remade and ported it to the TurboGrafx-CD as Riot Zone (known in Japan as Crest of Wolf (クレスト オブ ウルフ or 狼的紋章)). The sprites of Paul and Bobby were modified and used for the main characters of Riot Zone, Hawk (who uses Paul's) and Tony (who uses Bobby's). Some parts of several Riot City stages were also recycled for use in Riot Zone. Unlike Riot City, Riot Zone lacks multiplayer and features high-quality music instead of chip-tune music.
