= Clockwork Aquario =

2021 video game

- Developer: Westone (Note: Restoration work by ININ Games)
- Publishers: ININ Games; Strictly Limited Games
- Designer: Ryuichi Nishizawa
- Programmer: Takanori Kurihara
- Artist: Mina Morioka
- Composer: Shinichi Sakamoto
- Platforms: Nintendo Switch; PlayStation 4; Xbox One; Xbox Series X/S
- Release: Switch, PS4: JP/EU: November 30, 2021; NA: December 14, 2021; Xbox One, Series X/S: WW: December 7, 2023; Windows: WW: TBA
- Genres: Action, platform
- Modes: Single-player, multiplayer

Clockwork Aquario (Note: Japanese: 時計じかけのアクワリオ, Hepburn: Tokeijikake no Aquario; lit. "Aquario of the Clockwork") is a platform game developed by Westone and published by ININ Games for the Nintendo Switch, PlayStation 4, Xbox One, Xbox Series X/S. The gameplay involves defeating waves of enemies, picking up power-ups and items, and destroying bosses across multiple levels to stop Dr. Hangyo from taking over the world.

Clockwork Aquario was intended to be the last arcade game by Westone, developed in 1992 for Sega System 18 and push the hardware to its limits; however, it was canceled due to the increasing popularity of 3D games and fighting games in arcades as well as negative feedback during location tests in 1993. In 2017, Strictly Limited Games acquired the rights from Sega, with ININ Games collaborating on a restoration work alongside former Westone staff members as certain elements from the project's source code were lost. Clockwork Aquario holds the Guinness world record for the longest time between the start of a video game project and its release, at 28 years and 81 days.

Clockwork Aquario garnered mixed reception from critics; praise was directed to the unconventional pick-up-and-throw combo-chaining system similar to Treasure titles due to the controls, colorful visuals reminiscent of the Mega Drive era, soundtrack and co-op multiplayer, but other felt mixed in regards to the gameplay, difficulty, superfluous ideas, mechanics and overall presentation, while its short length was universally criticized.

== Gameplay ==
Gameplay screenshot.

Clockwork Aquario is an action-platform game reminiscent of Super Mario Bros. and Wonder Boy III: Monster Lair, where players assume the role of Huck Rondo, Elle Moon or the robot Gush through five stages in order to stop Dr. Hangyo with his plan to take over the world. Players attack by stomping or slapping to grab and throw enemies out across multiple directions, headbutt enemies thrown at characters, as well as catching enemies thrown by other players. In addition, a player can pick up another player and throw them against enemies. Players also have the ability to turn invincible against enemies for a brief period before the character's invincibility gauge is depleted, which can be replenished by picking up items.

On each stage, players must defeat a sub-boss to obtain a key in order to enter the boss' lair. The bosses can be defeated by stepping on or throwing an enemy them to clear the stage. The game features a 2-hit points per life system similar to Ghosts 'n Goblins, in which getting hit once would make the player's clothes look tattered and getting hit a second time results in a life lost, however the character's clothes can be restored by picking up a health item. Once all life stocks are lost, the game is over but players have the option to continue playing.

== Development and release ==
Clockwork Aquario was created in 1992 at Westone. It was intended to be their final arcade game, and most of the staff were previously involved with several entries in the Wonder Boy/Monster World series. Clockwork Aquario was designed to push the hardware limits of the Sega System 18 board. Ryuichi Nishizawa served as designer alongside programmer Takanori Kurihara, artist Mina Morioka and composer Shinichi Sakamoto. Both Nishizawa and Sakamoto recounted the project's development process and history through various publications, stating that the project was created over the course of two years and intended to resemble Wonder Boy III: Monster Lair but focusing on co-op play before the team added a third player. However, the team reverted to a two-player format at one point during development. Nishizawa stated that the game was coded in Assembler language and recalled that the team used in-circuit emulation for debugging. Nishizawa claimed that the System 18 was a complex and difficult board to work with, due to programmers having to control two graphical functions with one MPU.

Clockwork Aquario was first playable in a mostly-complete state during location tests at Shinjuku and Ueno in 1993. However, the release was ultimately cancelled in 1994 due to poor response from players as well as the increasing popularity of both 3D games and fighting games in arcades. The game's cancellation also led to Westone withdrawing from arcades and focus on console titles. On October 27, 2006, the original soundtrack by Sakamoto was released through D4 Enterprise's EGG MUSIC label. In 2020, German publisher Strictly Limited Games announced that it would be launched in 2020 for Nintendo Switch and PlayStation 4 as a limited physical and digital release by ININ Games, after acquiring the rights from Sega. ININ Games also collaborated alongside former Westone staff members including Nishizawa on a restoration effort as certain elements from the project's source code, which was originally transferred to M2 after Westone closed its doors in 2013, were lost. However, Strictly Limited Games and ININ Games postponed the release to early 2021. In November 2020, Strictly Limited Games announced physical editions in limited supply for Nintendo Switch and PlayStation 4. The game was first released on November 30, 2021 in Japan and Europe, followed by a North American release on December 14. The game was also planned for release on Windows and Xbox One in Summer 2022 but was delayed. It was later announced to be releasing for Xbox One and Xbox Series X/S on December 7, 2023, however, no date for the version for Windows was revealed. Clockwork Aquario holds the Guinness world record for the longest time between the start of a video game project and its release, at 28 years and 81 days.

== Reception ==
Reception

Aggregate score
| Aggregator | Score |
|---|---|
| Metacritic | NS: 70/100; PS4: 66/100 |

Review scores
| Publication | Score |
|---|---|
| Destructoid | 7/10 |
| Famitsu | 28/40 |
| Hardcore Gamer | 4/5 |
| HobbyConsolas | 77/100 |
| Nintendo Life | 9/10 |
| Nintendo World Report | 7/10 |
| The Games Machine (Italy) | 7/10 |
| TouchArcade | 3.5/5 |
| Video Chums | 7.5/10 |

According to review aggregator site Metacritic, Clockwork Aquario received "mixed or average" reviews on both PS4 and Switch. Famitsu's four reviewers found it to be a simple side-scrolling action game, commending its simple but deep combo-chaining system, colorful visuals reminiscent of the Mega Drive era, detailed backgrounds, controls and overall presentation, but they felt mixed in regards to the grab and throw mechanic. HobbyConsolas' Daniel Quesada praised the game's steampunk-esque design, Shinichi Sakamoto's soundtrack, dynamic co-op multiplayer and presentation but criticized its short length, unbalanced difficulty curve, repetitive and low quality character voices and overall visibility due to the colorful visuals. Reviewing the PS4 version,

Video Chums' A.J. Maciejewski found its pick-up-and-throw gameplay mechanic to be unconventional and gave positive remarks to the visuals, cartoon-style artwork, energetic music, frantic multiplayer and presentation. However, Maciejewski criticized the title for its short length and unfair surprise enemy attacks, while also noting that each character using the same playstyle felt tedious. Nintendo Life's Kerry Brunskill gave positive commentary to the pixel art, creative stages and multiplayer, but noted its short length, certain aspects of the presentation and extra modes for being minor variations of the main game. Hardcore Gaming 101's Kurt Kalata stated that its visuals were some the best Westone produced and commended the energetic action, upbeat soundtrack, attention to detail and multiplayer. Regardless, Kalata noted its short length and low difficulty even on harder settings, while criticizing the game's mechanics.

Hardcore Gamer' Jeremy Peeples stated that "Clockwork Aquario is a fantastic action-platformer that blends quick-moving playable characters and enemies alongside an inventive attack strategy. There's nothing else like it on the market today — despite so many games trying to replicate arcade-style fun." Peeples felt that the grab and throw mechanic was reminiscent of Treasure titles like Gunstar Heroes and Dynamite Headdy due to its depth and controls, while praising the addictive gameplay, accessible difficulty, audio design and visuals. Nintendo World Report's Neal Ronaghan commended the 2D sprite-based visuals and fun co-op multiplayer but criticized its short length, confusing menu interface and lack of additional content, regarding it "more as a curiosity than a game to keep coming back to."

TouchArcade' Shaun Musgrave criticized the title's short length, as well as superfluous ideas and mechanics, though he commended the stages' visual variety and found it to be a fascinating piece of history. Destructoid's Chris Moyse also reviewed the PS4 version, giving positive remarks to its visuals due to the sprite work and detailed backgrounds, whimsical soundtrack and 1990s anime-style aesthetic, but found the gameplay to be standard and noted its short length given the asking retail price. The Games Machine's Danilo Dellafrana praised the audiovisual presentation, artistic direction and smooth frame rate, but felt that it was "Perhaps too linear and simple for today's audience."
