= IS – internal section =

1999 video game

iS: internal section
- Developer: Positron
- Publisher: Square
- Producer: Tetsuhisa Tsuruzono
- Composers: Shinji Hosoe; Ayako Saso
- Platform: PlayStation
- Release: JP: January 28, 1999
- Genres: Shooter, music
- Mode: Single player

iS: internal section (イズ ～インターナル・セクション～) is a video game developed by Positron and published by Square and released in 1999.

== Gameplay ==
iS: internal section is a tube shooter, in the same vein of gameplay as Tempest 2000 and N_{2}O: Nitrous Oxide.

A tube shooter is a type of shoot 'em up where the player controls a ship "looking down" a long tunnel or tube, and the player can move around inside the cylinder, shooting enemies that it runs into while moving. It is an experimental project that responds to its 16 built-in tracks, or even your own music from a CD.

The game featured twelve weapons, all of which have names that derive from the Chinese Zodiac.

The graphics in the game feature flat shaded models, and the players ship and enemies are simple polygon shapes.

The game has a default techno soundtrack, but music from a compact disk can be added to the game.

== Release ==
iS: Internal section was released on January 28, 1999, for the Sony PlayStation and was published by Square. The game was ultimately never released outside of Japan. It has also never been re-released for the PlayStation Network's Game Archives in Japan as well. Later, a track from the game was later released in the compilation CD SQUARE ENIX BATTLE TRACKS Vol.3 SQUARE 1999 - 2000.

== Reception ==
Weekly Famitsu gave it a score of 24 out of 40.

Video Games gave it a 4/5 score.

Gamers' Republic listed the game in the 1999 Video Game Buyers Guide and Y2K Preview as one of the best games to import from Japan that year along with such games as, Bangai-O, Neon Genesis Evangelion, Pepsiman, Robot Dandy, and The Adventures of Little Ralph.

In 2015, Retro Gamer magazine listed it as number 5 on their list of "The 20 Greatest PlayStation Games You've Never Played".
