= Wonder Boy III =

Wonder Boy III can refer to:

- Wonder Boy III: The Dragon's Trap, originally released for the Master System in 1989.
- Wonder Boy III: Monster Lair, originally released as an arcade game in 1988.
