= Wonder Boy: The Dragon's Trap =

2017 video game

- Cover art featuring Wonder Boy (right), Wonder Girl (left), and their various transformations, with Nightmare Dragon in the background
- Developer: Lizardcube
- Publishers: WW: Dotemu; NA: Nicalis; EU: Headup Games
- Director: Omar Cornut
- Programmer: Sebastien Ronsse
- Artist: Ben Fiquet
- Composer: Michael Geyre
- Series: Wonder Boy
- Platforms: Nintendo Switch; PlayStation 4; Xbox One; Windows; Linux; macOS; Android; iOS; tvOS
- Release: Switch, PS4, Xbox One; 18 April 2017; Windows; 8 June 2017; Linux, macOS; 18 July 2017; Android, iOS, tvOS; 30 May 2019; Amazon Luna; 20 October 2020
- Genres: Platform, action-adventure
- Mode: Single-player

Wonder Boy: The Dragon's Trap is a 2017 platform action-adventure game developed by Lizardcube and published by Dotemu. The game is a remake of the 1989 game Wonder Boy III: The Dragon's Trap, which was originally developed by Westone Bit Entertainment and published by Sega for the Master System as part of the Wonder Boy series. The game takes place after the ending of Wonder Boy in Monster Land, in which Wonder Boy has been cursed by the Mecha Dragon and must go on a quest to return to human form. In the game, players find items and clues needed to access different parts of Monster Land, and they can transform into other forms and gain different abilities.

Wonder Boy: The Dragon's Trap was released for Nintendo Switch, PlayStation 4, and Xbox One in April 2017, later releasing for Microsoft Windows, macOS and Linux computers, iOS and Android mobile platforms in 2019, and Amazon Luna in 2020. The game was developed by Lizardcube, in which all the art and animation for the game were single-handedly reproduced. The soundtrack was reimagined from the original game's chiptune soundtrack using real musical instruments. The game received positive reviews from critics, and the game has sold nearly 500,000 copies.

== Gameplay ==
Wonder Boy: The Dragon's Trap is a remake of the original Wonder Boy III: The Dragon's Trap, with gameplay reverse engineered from the original Master System code, featuring brand new hand-drawn graphics and musical rearrangements. Set immediately after the events of Wonder Boy in Monster Land, players control an adventurer who, upon defeating the Mecha Dragon, has become afflicted with a curse turning them into a Lizard-Man. The player must journey across the world and defeat all the other dragons in the land in order to return to their human form. As in the original game, players explore various lands, defeating enemies to earn items, such as arrows and fireballs, and money which can be used to purchase new weapons and armor. Over the course of the game, the player gains new animal forms, each with new abilities allowing for additional exploration. These include Lizard-Man, who can spit fire, Mouse-Man, who can cling onto checkerboard-patterned blocks, Piranha-Man, who can swim underwater, Lion-Man, who can perform a vertical slash attack, and Hawk-Man, who can fly through the air.

The game retains the gameplay and level design of the original game, albeit with some enhancements such as instant weapon-toggling and removing the need to acquire charm stones to purchase new equipment. The game also supports passwords from the original game. New features added to the remake include additional difficulty settings, the option to play as a female character named Wonder Girl, hidden bonus areas, and the ability to independently toggle the graphics and audio between modern and retro styles with additional options for visual filters and FM audio. This marks the first time FM audio had been available officially in a Western release of the game. When a game with Wonder Girl selected as the player character was the last to be exited, the title screen is instead styled Wonder Girl: The Dragon's Trap.

== Development ==
The idea of creating a fan remake of Wonder Boy III: The Dragon's Trap was originally conceived by Omar Cornut as early as 1998. Development eventually began in late 2013, and the remake was first announced in June 2016. According to Cornut, the goal was to create a game whose gameplay was as close as possible to the original version.

The remake was originally developed by programmer Cornut and artist Ben Fiquet, who previously worked together on Soul Bubbles, as a fan remake developed by reverse engineering the original Master System game's code. Lizardcube worked on the game in collaboration with original game designer Ryuichi Nishizawa, who acted in an advisory role during development. Fiquet produced all the art and animation for the game single-handedly. Despite requests from fans to include characters from Monica's Gang, mimicking how the original game was released in Brazil under the same license, Lizardcube have stated that it would not be possible due to the licenses required, although an unofficial fan-created mod for the PC version was released in July 2017. The same also applies to using sprites from Hudson Soft's TurboGrafx-16 port of the game, Dragon's Curse, as the rights to that version are currently held by Konami.

To replicate the gameplay from scratch, developers extracted code from the original game cartridge and then read the information using a hex editor. The code from the original game consisted of game data written in Zilog Z80 assembly code as well as other game data. Using reverse engineering, developers used a disassembler to convert the data into Z80 code; then, using a debugger and the MEKA Sega Master System emulator, they would observe what the blocks of code were doing. They then developed a new game with the information with modern improvements in mind, including smoother physics, improved frame rate from the original 30 fps, and going from a 4:3 aspect ratio to widescreen.

The game's soundtrack is composed by Michael Geyre, who re-imagined the original soundtrack composed by Shinichi Sakamoto. The original chiptune soundtrack was arranged using real musical instruments played by musicians. The arranged soundtrack incorporates elements from several world music traditions, including classical, tango, Middle-Eastern and Japanese music. The soundtrack was released on Steam and Bandcamp on 12 July 2017. A vinyl soundtrack was released by Fangamer on 13 August 2018.

Limited Run Games released a physical PlayStation 4 version in both standard and collector's editions in Summer 2017. Arc System Works also published a physical edition of the PlayStation 4 version in Asia in July 2017. A retail release of the PlayStation 4 and Nintendo Switch versions was published by Nicalis on 13 February 2018 in North America and by Headup Games on 20 April 2018 in Europe. Pikii published a physical version for the Nintendo Switch in Japan.

== Reception ==
Reception

Aggregate score
| Aggregator | Score |
|---|---|
| Metacritic | NS: 79/100; PS4: 79/100; XONE: 80/100 |

Review scores
| Publication | Score |
|---|---|
| Destructoid | 8.5/10 |
| Eurogamer | Recommended |
| GameSpot | 8/10 |
| IGN | 7.1/10 |
| Nintendo Life | 8/10 |
| Nintendo World Report | 8/10 |
| TouchArcade | 4/5 |
| HobbyConsolas | 84% |
| Slant Magazine | 8/10 |

Wonder Boy: The Dragon's Trap has received mostly positive reviews, with the Switch version currently holding a score of 79/100 on Metacritic. IGN said that "while (the original game)'s design definitely shows its age, (the remake) still has a few wonders in store for us thanks to a solid foundation, aesthetic upgrades, and some much-appreciated updates to the original programming." GameSpot praised its visual enhancements and called it "one of the best retro remakes yet". Eurogamer also praised the game, saying that it sets the bar for updating classics. As of September 2017, the Switch version of the game has outsold all other versions combined. As of April 2019, the game has sold nearly 500,000 copies. Nintendo Life later called it one of the best metroidvania games on the Nintendo Switch, "a perfectly-pitched non-linear action adventure [and] a Metroidvania before the term coagulated into existence".
