= Dungeon Explorer (1995 video game) =

- Developers: Hudson Soft, Westone
- Publishers: NA: Sega; EU: Hudson Soft
- Directors: Hideo Nakajima; Ryuichi Nishizawa
- Producer: Bill Ritch
- Designers: Kōta Kikuchi; Yutaka Hirata
- Programmers: Michishito Ishizuka; Takanori Kurihara
- Artists: Katsuo Saito; Mina Morioka; Rieko Sumi
- Composers: Jin Watanabe; Shinichi Sakamoto
- Platform: Sega CD
- Release: NA: May 1995; EU: 1995
- Genres: Action role-playing game, dungeon crawl, hack and slash
- Modes: Single-player, multiplayer

Dungeon Explorer is an action role-playing video game co-developed by Hudson Soft and Westone and published by Sega in North America in May 1995 exclusively for the Sega CD and later in Europe by Hudson Soft the same year. The third installment in the eponymous franchise, it shares the same name as with 1989's Dungeon Explorer but is not a port of any previous entry and is very different from other titles in the series.

Taking place in a fantasy world where a powerful evil being known as the Darkling holds a goddess under captivity in his residing tower, players assume the role of one of the six playable main characters to complete a number of dungeons in order to defeat the Darkling and free the goddess, who will grant any wish to those capable of challenging her captor. Dungeon Explorer on Sega CD was met with mostly positive reception from critics and reviewers alike since its release, though many publications felt mixed in regards to several aspects such as the graphics, audio, gameplay and multiplayer, with some noting its similarities with Gauntlet.

== Gameplay ==
Gameplay screenshot

Dungeon Explorer on the Sega CD is an action role-playing game with dungeon crawl and hack and slash elements that is played in a top-down perspective like its predecessors, where players assume the role of one of the six playable characters and complete a series of six dungeons, each one hosting a boss at the end that must be fought before progressing any further, in order to free the goddess of ambition from her captivity at the tower of an evil being known as the Darkling. Each character belongs to a specific class and their abilities vary primarily in their statistics, however, the game now supports up to four players simultaneously via multitap unlike previous entries. The game supports game save with either the Sega CD's internal backup RAM or the CD BackUp RAM cartridge.

== Synopsis ==
Dungeon Explorer on the Sega CD takes place in a fantasy world where a powerful evil being known as the Darkling resided in an impenetrable tower, taking what he desired from humans who approached near his location and killing those who looked at him, staking his victims as a sign of warning for those who reached the tower. However the Darkling feared humankind, knowing that he would be challenged for his lands and one enemy equally matched his power; the goddess of ambition, who could grant any wish to those capable of performing her bidding. The Darkling captured the goddess and threw her at his tower's dungeon, with the goddess waiting to be free from her captivity and grant any wish to her liberator. Rumors of the goddess and the fate of adventurers who went missing began, with more people arriving at the Jojo tavern and telling about their past adventures before departing to the tower.

== Development and release ==
Dungeon Explorer on the Sega CD was co-developed by Hudson Soft and Westone, the latter company being best known for the Wonder Boy/Monster World franchise, with additional support from Sega. Most of the development team at Westone were previously involved with several entries in the Wonder Boy/Monster World series, with co-founder Ryuichi Nishizawa and Hideo Nakajima serving as co-directors, while Bill Rich served as producer at Hudson Soft. Takanori Kurihara and Westone co-founder Michishito Ishizuka acted as programmers, while Nishizawa and Nakajima also served as level designers alongside Kōta Kikuchi and Yutaka Hirata. Nakajima was also involved as artist with Katsuo Saito, Mina Morioka, Rieko Sumi and Takai Sekiyama, who were responsible for the pixel art. The soundtrack was co-composed by Jin Watanabe and Shinichi Sakamoto, with Sakamoto also being responsible for sound effects and voicework alongside Nakajima and Watanabe. The game was first published in North America by Sega in May 1995 and later in Europe by Hudson Soft on the same year.

== Reception ==
Reception

Aggregate score
Aggregator	Score
GameRankings	40%

Review scores
Publication	Score
GamePro	13.5 / 20
Next Generation	3/5
Consoles +	85%
GamesMaster	78%
Game Players	76%
Gamers	2 (B)
Joypad	55%
MAN!AC	73%
Mega Force	87%
Mega Fun	67%
Play Time	70%
Player One	65%
RPGFan	40%
Sega Power	70%
Top Consoles	14 / 20
Video Games	71%
VideoGames	9 / 10

Next Generation reviewed the game, rating it three stars out of five, and stated that "the title isn't groundbreaking, but most of the puzzles are clever, and the variety and challenge will keep your interest high".
