= Magical Pop'n =

1995 video game

- Cover art by Takami Akai
- Developer: Polestar
- Publisher: Pack-in-Video
- Producers: Shōtarō Hara; Yasuhiro Wada
- Designers: Hidetoshi Nakajima; Jun Hoyano; Kazunao Tajiri
- Programmer: Hiroyuki Tani
- Artists: Kaori Kawashima; Yumiko Tokutake
- Composer: Ichirou Ishibashi
- Platform: Super Famicom
- Release: JP: 10 March 1995
- Genres: Action, platform
- Mode: Single-player

Magical Pop'n (Note: Japanese: マジカルポップン, Hepburn: Majikaru Poppun) is a side-scrolling action-platform video game. It was developed by Polestar and published by Pack-In-Video exclusively for the Super Famicom in Japan on 10 March 1995. In Magical Pop'n, the Demon King's army invades the kingdom of To'ahl and steals a magic gem that holds tremendous power from the castle. The Princess (voiced by AV idol Ai Iijima) then sets out on a journey to retrieve the stolen gem, before it can be used for the Demon King's nefarious plans of world domination. Its gameplay consists of platforming and exploration with a main six-button configuration, featuring special moves and techniques.

Magical Pop'n was co-produced by Shōtarō Hara and Yasuhiro Wada. Wada would later become well-known for his work as producer on his next game, the 1996 SFC/SNES game Harvest Moon, also published by Pack-in-Video. The larger Harvest Moon franchise would go on to be popular and a great success.

The game has been met with mixed reception from critics. Critics criticized the high difficulty, voice acting, lack of any support for saving the game, and for being a fairly standard action title, while the controls, graphics, and animations received praise. In the years after its release, Magical Pop'n become an expensive collector's item and one of the rarest Super Famicom titles. Cartridges fetch high prices in the secondary video game collecting market.

== Gameplay ==
Gameplay screenshot

Magical Pop'n is a side-scrolling action-platform game similar to The Adventure of Little Ralph. The player takes control of the Princess, the main protagonist of the game, through six stages of varying themes set in the land of To'ahl. The main objective is to recover the kingdom's powerful Magic Jewel that was stolen by the army of the game's main antagonist, the Demon King, and defeat his many servants. At the end of each stage is a powerful boss enemy that must be defeated in order to progress further. The stages are organized in a mazelike and non-linear fashion, which encourages exploration in order to find new items hidden in treasure chests. Example power-ups include extra heart containers that increase the player's total health, and obtaining magical spells; the Princess starts off with only a three-heart life gauge and one spell attack at the beginning. The player can also increase the Princess's number of lives by collecting three golden tokens (which look like the Princess's face) per life. There is no password or saving feature, so the game must be completed in one session.

Controlling the Princess is done with the D-pad, while jumping and attacking enemies are performed with either the A or Y button for magic or melee attacks. Repeatedly pressing the Y button increases the range of melee attacks, which allows the Princess to hang on certain objects and while jumping with the B button, the player can perform a pogo stick-like attack against enemies from above by holding down and Y. The L and R buttons change between different magic attacks, while pressing Select on the controller activates a powerful magic attack against enemies as well. When crouching, the Princess can also slide by holding forward and B.

== Plot ==
To'ahl is a peaceful kingdom where magic flourishes and home of the Princess, an energetic young girl who lives in the castle of the land that houses the Magic Jewel with her mentor and caretaker Gramps. During a session where Gramps was lecturing Princess with the kingdom's rules of magic, his crystal ball began to glow and float off the table, predicting an upcoming evil event, however the princess was too distracted with the floating ball to notice the future omen. At the same night, an army headed by the Demon King invades the kingdom and manages to steal the jewel, which holds a tremendous power that allows him to conquer the world with ease. As a result, the Princess dons a sword and embarks on a journey to retrieve the jewel back to the kingdom. After travelling through several locations, the Princess reaches the Demon King's location and eventually manages to defeat him, recovering the Magic Jewel and restoring peace to the land of To'ahl and the world.

== Development and release ==
Magical Pop'n was the second game to be developed by Polestar after Aurora Quest: Otaku no Seiza in Another World for the TurboGrafx-CD in 1993. Shōtarō Hara served as a co-producer of the project along with Yasuhiro Wada, who would later go on to work on his next Super NES game, Harvest Moon, which was also released in the same year. The game served as the voice acting debut of Japanese media and former AV idol personality Ai Iijima, who started her adult video career in 1992 and provided her voice for the main character. Gainax co-founder Takami Akai was also responsible in drawing the artwork for the front cover of the box. Magical Pop'n was released in Japan on 10 March 1995 for the Super Famicom and was published by Pack-in-Video. The game has never been released outside of Japan.

Since its initial release, Magical Pop'n has become one of the rarest Super Famicom titles, alongside titles such as Rendering Ranger: R2 which had only 10,000 copies released. It was listed in 2016 as costing 100,000 yen with the box, and without it at 30,000 yen. In the 2018, a successful bid at 80,000 yen was recorded at auction. A full pristine unopened copy can fetch up to 200,000 yen. As of date, ownership of the intellectual property rights to the game currently belong to Marvelous Entertainment. The game has also been featured at the Games Done Quick speed-running events.

== Reception ==
Reception

Review score
Publication	Score
Famitsu	6/10, 5/10, 6/10, 6/10

Upon release, four reviewers for Famitsu magazine compared it to the Monster World series and remarked it was a rather standard, ordinary, and old-fashioned style of game. They noted that the attack range of the character is low, and it was rather difficult, but they praised the character's movements. In a poll taken by Family Computer Magazine, the game received a score of 18.8 out of 30, indicating a middling following.

The book Perfect Guide to Nostalgic Super Famicom, was rather critical of Ai Iijima's voice acting, calling it husky, monotone, and ill-suited for a moe type of character.

The complicated stage structure, lack of password or saving function, led to the game being noted for not being suitable for children who are not allowed to play video games for long hours at home.

Retro Gamer described the visuals as "cute" and called it a "hidden gem" while recommending the game among the top five Super Nintendo games for British gamers to import, alongside Majyūō, DoRemi Fantasy, Chrono Trigger, and Ogre Battle. Allistair Pinsof of Destructoid, praised the game, saying the controls were as good as that of Super Metroid and Super Castlevania IV.
