= Nizar A. Mullani =

American physicist and entrepreneur (born 1942)

Nizar Abdul Mullani
- Born: Nizar Abdul Mullani; October 22, 1942 (age 83); Dar es Salaam, Tanzania
- Education: Washington University in St. Louis
- Occupations: Physicist, entrepreneur
- Spouse: Linda Mullani (m. 1996; died 2021)
- Children: Ethan Mullani (b. 1984)

Nizar A. Mullani (born October 22, 1942) is an American physicist and entrepreneur. Mullani's research and technological innovation has included pioneering work in positron emission tomography, vein imaging and dermoscopy. He was the Georg Charles de Hevesy Nuclear Pioneer Award recipient in 2023.

Since 1998, Mullani has focused on entrepreneurial ventures, bringing several of his inventions to market under the Veinlite and DermLite brands.

== Early life and education ==
Mullani was one of five children born to Indian parents in Dar es Salaam, Tanzania.

In 1963, Nizar Mullani immigrated to the United States, enrolling at Washington University in St. Louis, Missouri. He graduated with a Bachelor of Science in Physics.

== Early career ==
Following his studies, Mullani was appointed as a Research Assistant at the Biomedical Computer Lab of the Washington University School of Medicine (1969–1980) where he worked on the early PET camera models and imaging techniques.

From 1976 to 1980, Mullani held a Research Assistant position at the Mallinckrodt Institute of Radiology.

In 1980, Mullani was hired as an Assistant Professor and Director of PET instrumentation at the University of Texas Medical School, developing an advanced Time-of-Flight PET camera. He also contributed toward the development of the Rubidium-82 generator for use with imaging blood flow in the heart.

== Business career ==
=== Positron Corporation ===
In 1984, Mullani founded Positron Corporation. Positron designed and manufactured POSICAM Positron Emission Tomography (PET) Scanners for the imaging of cancer and heart disease.

=== TransLite LLC ===
In 1998, Mullani launched TransLite LLC and the Veinlite brand. Veinlite devices utilize transillumination technology to image veins in real time. There have been three clinical validation studies performed using Veinlite devices, demonstrating an improvement in venous access success rates (92.9% first-stick success rate, compared to 72% in Standard of Care) in children and adults.

=== 3Gen LLC ===
In 1999, Mullani founded 3Gen LLC. He designed the first DermLite product and subsequently served as director of research and development responsible for new products. DermLite products use polarized imaging to magnify deep into the epidermis layer skin, aiding in early detection of skin cancer.

== Innovations and designs ==
Mullani holds several U.S. patents and trademarks related to positron emission tomography, dermoscopy and vein imaging.

== Awards and recognition ==
In 2023, Mullani was named recipient of the 2023 SNMMI Georg Charles de Hevesy Nuclear Pioneer Award, which is given each year to an individual for outstanding contributions to the field of nuclear medicine.
