= Monster Boy and the Cursed Kingdom =

2018 video game

- Developer: Game Atelier
- Publisher: FDG Entertainment
- Director: Fabien Demeulenaere
- Producers: Thomas Kern; Philipp Döschl
- Designer: Ryuichi Nishizawa
- Programmer: David Bellanco Lopez
- Artist: Johan Lun
- Writer: Miguel Vidaure
- Composers: Cédric Joder; Keiki Kobayashi; Yuzo Koshiro; Motoi Sakuraba; Michiru Yamane
- Series: Wonder Boy
- Platforms: Nintendo Switch; PlayStation 4; Xbox One; Windows; Stadia; PlayStation 5; Xbox Series X/S; macOS; iOS; Apple TV
- Release: Nintendo Switch, PS4; WW: December 4, 2018; JP: August 6, 2020 Xbox One; December 4, 2018; Windows; July 25, 2019; Stadia; July 1, 2020; PlayStation 5; December 2, 2021; Xbox Series X/S; August 2, 2022
- Genres: Metroidvania, platform
- Mode: Single-player

Monster Boy and the Cursed Kingdom is a 2018 platform game developed by Game Atelier and published by FDG Entertainment. Part of the Wonder Boy series, it was released for Nintendo Switch, PlayStation 4 and Xbox One in December 2018, for Windows in July 2019, for Stadia in July 2020, for PlayStation 5 in December 2021, and for Xbox Series X/S in August 2022. It was generally well received by critics.

== Plot ==
A boy named Jin discovers his Uncle Nabu using magic to spread chaos across the kingdom, turning everyone, including his brother Zeke, into animals. While trying to stop Nabu, Jin gets turned into a pig. Learning from the king's court magician, Mysticat, about a way to return everyone to normal, Jin goes on a quest to recover five animal orbs from across the kingdom. Upon doing so, however, Mysticat takes the orbs from Jin and uses them to open the gateway to the Dark Realm for his master Lord Xaros, who had been manipulating Nabu to do his bidding. Venturing into the Dark Realm, Jin confronts Xaros and, with the help of his friends and the spirits of past Wonder Boys, manages to defeat him, restoring the kingdom to normal.

== Gameplay ==
Monster Boy and the Cursed Kingdom is a side-scrolling adventure game in which players control Jin as he battles enemies and solves puzzles to progress through the story. Similar to the 1989 Master System game, Wonder Boy III: The Dragon's Trap, Jin gains five different animal forms throughout the course of the game, which can be switched between at will once obtained. These include a pig who can sniff out hidden contraptions and clues; a snake who can spit venom, climb walls and enter small spaces; a frog who can swim, use his tongue to swing on hoops and carry items; a lion who can dash and break through blocks; and a dragon who can fly and spit fire projectiles. Jin's human form can warp and pass through obstacles. In addition to these forms, players can obtain weapons and armor from shops, many of which offer unique abilities and can be upgraded by finding gemstones. There are also various magic spells that can be used by Jin in either his human or pig forms. Defeated enemies may drop coins, hearts or magic resources.

Exploration works similarly to "Metroidvania" titles, where the player goes through interconnected areas that require certain abilities in order to be accessed. Over the course of the game, the player gains access to fast travel teleporters that allows to quickly move from one area to the other. Exploration often rewards players with magic upgrades, health point increases and also pieces of the legendary golden armor, which upon collected can be forged by a blacksmith.

The game uses an auto-save system upon going through the save altars, which come in two variations: the normal save altar, and the angel save altar, which fully recovers Jin's health. Dying has no penalty, and the player will return to the last checkpoint without losing any progress; any items and coins obtained will be retained.

The game also features a map which provides information about various areas, and also shows places where the player is supposed to go at the current time. The map develops and adds new images as the player moves through the game.

== Development ==
Monster Boy was originally created by Paris-based studio Game Atelier as a planned Kickstarter project titled Flying Hamster II: Knight of the Golden Seed, a sequel to the company's 2010 Flying Hamster. The Kickstarter was canceled and a partnership with FDG Entertainment was announced. After a year of silence, Game Atelier revealed that they had partnered with LAT Corp to officially incorporate the title into the Wonder Boy series. Since the trademark was held separately from the rest of the IP, a new title was chosen, combining Monster World and Wonder Boy: "Monster Boy and the Wizard of Booze." The game was later retitled to Monster Boy and the Cursed Kingdom due to criticisms towards the previous subtitle's reference to alcohol.

The game was developed in collaboration with Wonder Boy series creator Ryuichi Nishizawa, who also supported Dotemu and Lizardcube's remake of Wonder Boy III: The Dragon's Trap. The game's soundtrack was composed by Yuzo Koshiro, Motoi Sakuraba, Michiru Yamane, Keiki Kobayashi, and Takeshi Yanagawa, with the main theme performed by Haruka Shimotsuki. In addition to the original score, some rearranged music from past entries in the series by Shinichi Sakamoto was included. The soundtrack took two years to create, with over 40 pieces being included in the game.

Originally set to use motion-based sprite animation for the characters, the developers announced in October 2017 that they would be switching to hand-drawn animated sprites.

== Release ==
In February 2018, FDG Entertainment announced they partnered with Sega to release the Nintendo Switch and PlayStation 4 versions of the game as physical retail copies in North America, and launch them alongside the digital release on all platforms. It was originally scheduled to release on November 6, 2018, worldwide, however, due to "unforeseen difficulties" regarding the production of the physical copies, FDG Entertainment rescheduled the game's release for December 4, 2018. However, only console versions were released on that date due to the developers' distribution contract to finish those versions on time, with the Windows version being released on July 25, 2019.

The PlayStation 5 and Xbox Series X/S versions of Monster Boy and the Cursed Kingdom were announced in September 2020. They support free upgrade for existing owners of the game, and feature native 4K resolution at up to 120 frames per second. The PlayStation 5 version was released on December 2, 2021, and the Xbox Series X/S version followed on August 2, 2022.

Arc System Works released the game in Japan on August 6, 2020.

== Reception ==
Reception

Aggregate score
Aggregator	Score
Metacritic	NS: 86/100; PS4: 87/100; XONE: 85/100; PC: 82/100

Review scores
Publication	Score
GameSpot	8/10
Nintendo Life	9/10
Nintendo World Report	8.5/10

The game sold 50,000 copies within a week of its console release. In January 2019, FDG Entertainment announced that the Switch version sold eight times more copies than the PlayStation 4 and Xbox One versions combined.

It was generally well received by critics who praised its retro style and hand-drawn artwork, and has a score of 86 on Metacritic. NintendoLife noted the game's similarities to Wonder Boy, calling it a "sequel in all but name." The publication later noted it as one of the best metroidvania games on the Nintendo Switch.
