= Jaws (video game) =

1987 video game

- Developers: Atlus, Westone (uncredited)
- Publisher: LJN
- Programmer: Michishito Ishizuka
- Artist: Ryuichi Nishizawa
- Composer: Shinichi Sakamoto
- Platform: NES
- Release: NA: November 1987
- Genre: Action
- Mode: Single-player

Jaws is a video game for the Nintendo Entertainment System that is loosely based on the film franchise of the same name, specifically Jaws: The Revenge, the fourth and final film in the series. The box art is modeled heavily after the theatrical poster, and the back of the box mentions "...like it's personal", perhaps as a reference to said movie's tagline. However, the game does take elements from the first film. It is one of several LJN-published titles produced by the Japanese company Atlus, although Westone was subcontracted to actually develop it.

There was a separate computer adaptation of the original Jaws movie called Jaws: The Computer Game, released in 1989 by Screen 7 for the Amiga and for the Commodore 64 as simply Jaws by Box Office Software.

An enhanced version was released for the Nintendo Switch, Playstation 5, and PC on Friday the 13th of February, 2026.

== Gameplay ==
Gameplay screenshot

In the game, the player pilots a boat across the sea, randomly encountering groups of hostile sea creatures. When the boat hits something in the overhead map, the perspective changes to a side-view. The player's boat releases a diver who battles various undersea threats such as jellyfish, rays, and smaller sharks. Occasionally, Jaws will appear on the map in the form of its familiar dorsal fin breaking the water's surface. If players collide with Jaws' dorsal fin, they can momentarily control their boat in the side-view encounter in an attempt to attack Jaws with depth charges. Jaws will always collide with the boat and release the diver into the water. Jaws will also appear after a brief moment if the player snags something in the overhead map with Jaws nearby.

Items encountered include crabs (increases movement speed of the diver), stars (bonus points), and conch shells which are used as currency in this game. Equipment and upgrades are purchased by alternating between two ports on the map. The first port visit gives the player a receiver, which tracks the location of Jaws relative to the boat on the overhead map; the faster it beeps, the closer Jaws is to the player. Future visits to ports afterwards increase overall attack power against Jaws. Touching a hostile sea creature during the side-view undersea encounters will kill players and penalize them with a power level drop by one (if they had upgraded their attack power), the loss of the tracking device, the loss of half of the conch shells accumulated to that point, and complete health replenishment for Jaws.

Killing a specific number of smaller sharks will trigger a bonus game. In this bonus game, an airplane travels back and forth in a side-view perspective and drops cannonballs on jellyfish, which assume random formations and movement patterns. Players can adjust the speed of the airplane, depending on what direction it is traveling. The player is rewarded the number of conch shells equivalent to the number of jellyfish killed divided by three, rounded down. Hitting all the jellyfish awards 10,000 bonus points. An extra life is awarded for every 30,000 points.

The player can also find a submarine which appears at random places in the game map. The submarine is an upgrade with two weapons (torpedoes and depth charges) and much less inertia than the diver. The submarine is fragile, however, and one collision with an enemy will destroy it and release the diver (although this will not kill the diver).

Once Jaws' health has been reduced in the side-view encounter, the game changes to a "first person" view of the player's boat. Players are given three charges for their strobe device to force Jaws to breach the water's surface. Timing is essential in order to force Jaws to breach at the proper distance from the bow of the boat. Players can also jut the bow of their boat forward at any time. In order to fully defeat Jaws, the player must jab it with the boat's bow at the proper distance when it breaches from the strobe device. This can be quite difficult and requires much patience. Jaws makes random movements backward, forward and side-to-side which makes for a difficult final kill.

== Music ==
Although the title-screen track is based on John Williams' score to Steven Spielberg's 1975 film Jaws, composer Shinichi Sakamoto does not make explicit reference to Williams's work in any other part of the game. One possible exception is the "You've Hit Something!" music, which features the movie's characteristic oscillating minor-second.

One interpretation of Sakamoto's work notes his use of volume changes as a way to mimic the movement of water: "In Jaws (1987) [...] the overwater music sways from soft to loud and loud to soft, rocking back and forth like the undulating waves of a shark-infested ocean." The effect isn't very smooth, however, because of technological constraints: the Nintendo Entertainment System's sound chip was limited to 16 discrete volume settings.

== Reception ==
Computer Gaming World praised the game in its review, saying, "The graphics, animations and game play in Jaws are all first rate." It also listed Jaws as the most innovative game of the year.

AllGame gave the game a rating of one and a half stars out of a possible five in their review. The review commented the visuals in the game, noting a "dull overhead view of you sailing your boat" and "a repetitive side-view sequence". The review concluded that "by the time you reach the final anti-climactic scene, you'll be so tired that you won't care if you kill Jaws or not. You'll just be glad the game's almost over."

== Works cited ==
- Kunkel, Bill; Worley, Joyce; Katz, Arnie (1988). "Video Gaming World". Computer Gaming World. No. 53.
