= Wonder Boy in Monster World =

1991 video game

- European Mega Drive box art
- Developers: Westone; Shimada Kikaku (Master System)
- Publisher: Sega
- Composer: Shinichi Sakamoto
- Series: Wonder Boy
- Platforms: Sega Mega Drive/Genesis, Master System, PC Engine
- Release: Mega Drive/Genesis: JP: October 25, 1991; NA: February 1992; EU: April 1992; Master System: EU: August 1993; Turbo Duo: NA: March 1994; JP: May 20, 1994
- Genres: Platform, Action role-playing, Action-adventure, Metroidvania
- Mode: Single-player

Wonder Boy in Monster World, known in Japan as Wonder Boy V: Monster World III (ワンダーボーイV モンスターワールドIII), is a side-scrolling action role-playing game originally developed by Westone and published by Sega for the Mega Drive/Genesis in 1991. It is the fifth game in the Wonder Boy series and the third game in the Monster World sub-series, following Wonder Boy in Monster Land (Super Wonder Boy: Monster World on the Japanese Sega Mark III) and Wonder Boy III: The Dragon's Trap (Monster World II: Dragon no Wana on the Japanese Game Gear).

Versions for other platforms were also made. In 1993, Sega released a Master System version of the game specifically for the European market, while in 1994, Hudson Soft remade the game for the TurboDuo under the title of The Dynastic Hero (超英雄伝説ダイナスティックヒーロー, Chō Eiyū Densetsu Dainasutikku Hīrō), featuring an all-new theme and cast of characters. In 2007, the Turbo Duo and Mega Drive versions were re-released on the Wii Virtual Console download service.

== Gameplay ==
Wonder Boy In Monster World puts the player in control of Shion in his quest to save Monster World from the evil BioMeka. It controls like a standard platform game: run, jump, crouch, and kill enemies. The game is filled with adventure elements such as talking to townsfolk, collecting money to buy items, extending the life bar by gathering hearts, and equipping a large variety of armor, weapons and magic.

Shion travels through the many interconnected regions of Monster World and acquires increasingly powerful equipment in the form of different swords, spears, shields, suits of armor, and boots.

The Genesis version introduced a one slot save feature to save progress at inns throughout the game world. In the original Japanese version, Shion returned to the inn last saved at upon death (and was charged its fee accordingly). Returning to an inn to save in this version is a simple matter of allowing Shion to be killed. In the English-language Mega Drive versions, this was changed to a "Game Over" screen. This made it often tedious to return to the inns early in the game when Return magic had not been obtained yet. The Master System version uses a very complex, 45 character, password system.

== Plot ==
In the Genesis and Master System versions, Monster World is described as a once peaceful land. One day, peace was shattered by an invading army of monsters, with seemingly no source for their appearance. The Fairy Queen Eleanora headed to the town of Purapril to seek aid from the Princess after her town of Alsedo was attacked, only to discover that the Princess went missing and many other towns across Monster World have been attacked as well. Eleanora offers up a prayer to the gods that someone, perhaps even a hero, would step forward. Her prayers reach a young man named Shion, who vows to defeat the invading monsters and make Monster World peaceful again.

In the TurboGrafx-16 release, The Dynastic Hero, Monster World is instead named as the land of Tarron, a woodland that was once known as "the peaceful paradise". One day, the evil Drillkor Empire of reptilian monsters attacked Tarron using their advanced technology and space station. Rippen the Beast, Emperor of the Drillkor, attacks Tarron Castle and imprisons the Princess in her own castle dungeon. The princess prays to the gods of Tarron for the aid of a hero. The call to adventure is answered by a young warrior named Dyna, setting out to the fairy village Lindor for information from Queen Nora.

=== Characters ===
During his travels, Shion will often be joined by a small companion who follows him around. Each companion is bound to the region they belong to, and will return to their respective homes when Shion leaves that region. All travel companions will also temporarily stay out of action during boss fights. The Master System version omits all of these companions.

Priscilla	A small fairy who hails from Alsedo, the Fairy village. She joins Shion when he talks to Queen Eleanora. Priscilla will randomly fly over to an enemy and hit it with her wand, but this does no damage. To compensate, when Shion's health is getting low, she may conjure up a few small hearts for Shion to catch. In the Dynastic Hero, Priscilla is a butterfly fairy named "Sabrina"; her village is also renamed "Lindor".
Hotta	A dwarf who lives in the Dwarf village of Lilypad. He will follow Shion around when he has been saved from the bushmen. Hotta can break open certain walls, enabling Shion's entry into the nearby temple, as well as uncover a couple of hidden rooms inside the temple. He also randomly digs up a fountain of small coins. In the Dynastic Hero, Hotta is renamed as "Knut" and is redesigned as wearing armor based on a stag beetle; his village is also renamed as "Manta". In the Master System port, Hotta is not present and is replaced by a block in order to progress.
Shabo	A little summoned reaper, who Shion obtains in Childam, the Darkworld village. He flies alongside Shion throughout the Ice Caverns, attacking enemies randomly with his throwing scythe. In the Dynastic Hero, he is renamed as "Crik", who is a cricket warrior that attacks with his sword; his village was renamed as "Karak".
Rotto	The Elder Dragon's grandson hatchling, who will accompany Shion in Begonia, the Dragon village. He can help Shion through the volcano by frequently attacking enemies with his fire breath. This can be more of a hindrance than a help because it does low damage, and puts enemies in stunlock, preventing standard attacks from landing for a short amount of time. This may lead to the player character getting hit as soon as the stunlock ends. In the Dynastic Hero, Rotto is replaced by the Queen Bee's daughter, functioning in a similar matter and attacking with a spear; her village was renamed to "Bard".

==== Other characters ====
Fairy Queen Eleanora	Her village is the first to be visited by Shion. She lends him Priscilla, one of her fairy servants, to aid him in his journey through the Mushroom infested forest lair near Alsedo. Her name is shortened to "Nora" in the Dynastic Hero.
Princess Shiela Purapril	Shion rescues her early in the game from a Dark Knight. She will give him advice at a few points throughout the game upon visiting her at her castle. According to the Japanese manual, she is a descendant of Anju Purapril from Wonder Boy III: Monster Lair. Near the end, the game eventually suggests some sort of love interest. In the Dynastic Hero, she is a fairy princess named "Brenna", where her role is expanded to sending a prayer of hope that Dyna answers, as well as reviving Dyna's partners after the final battle.
Elder Dwarf	He is distraught about the kidnapping of Hotta, a young dwarf who lives in the village of Lilypad.
Elder Dragon	This wise dragon tells Shion how to obtain the materials for creating the Legendary Sword. He also sends his grandson Rotto along with Shion on his journey through the volcano. In the Dynastic Hero, the Elder Dragon is replaced by a Queen Bee, who sends Dyna to retrieve materials to reforge the Ancient Axe into the Legendary Sword, with her daughter being sent along.
The Darkworld Prince	The Prince has gone missing recently. Rumor has it he was abducted by an evil force. Once found, he will help Shion in the final battle. He is initially encountered in the Castle of Illusion in the form of the Almighty Demon King, having been forcibly transformed into him by the game's final boss. The Prince does not exist in the Dynastic Hero nor does he appear in the Master System port. The Demon King however does appear in the Master System version but no longer transforms back into the Prince. In the Dynastic Hero, the Demon King's role is taken on by Mandra, the Drillkor Empire's Blue General and second in command to Rippen the Beast.

== Conversions and ports ==
The Master System port is somewhat different. It features redrawn graphics, fewer and shorter stages, and a complex password system (approximately 45 digits in length) rather than battery-backed save data. The Genesis version is included on the North American and European releases of the Sega Genesis Mini microconsole.

Hudson Soft later released a slightly rebranded version for the Turbo Duo titled The Dynastic Hero. It features palette-swapped visuals, new insect-themed graphics for the main characters (and insects' natural predators as bosses), a Red Book audio soundtrack which is completely different from the Wonder Boy original, and anime-style cutscenes in the intro and ending. Shion was renamed Dyna and was modeled after a Hercules beetle, and the final boss was changed to a giant lizard king. An English-language version was also produced, but both were built off of the Japanese version of Wonder Boy in Monster World so they feature the same difficulty and mechanics as the Japanese version. This particular version was released on Nintendo's Virtual Console service in Europe on November 30, 2007, and in North America on December 3, 2007.

Tec Toy, Sega's distributor in Brazil, altered the Mega Drive version and released it as Turma da Mônica na Terra Dos Monstros (lit.: Monica's Gang in the Monsters' Land). Like other Wonder Boy-to-Monica conversions, the game is in Portuguese, the main character is Monica from the Monica's Gang comics, and other elements and characters from it were added. Following the re-release of the Sega Mega Drive by Tec Toy in Brazil, the Turma da Mônica na Terra Dos Monstros was also re-released with new boxing, a manual and a label in August 2017.

== Adaptation ==
The UK comic Sonic the Comic ran an eight-part comic strip through issues 2–9 starring Shion on his adventures in Demon World.

== Reception ==
Reception

Aggregate score
Aggregator	Score
GameRankings	SMD: 77% TG16: 75%

Review score
Publication	Score
Electronic Gaming Monthly	6/10, 7/10, 5/10, 7/10 (SMD)

Electronic Gaming Monthly gave the Turbo Duo version a 7.2 out of 10, praising the music, graphics, and vast size of the game. GamePro was less impressed, remarking the characters "have that doe-eyed look reminiscent of the best motel art" and figuring out how to use some of the items is difficult. They did praise the game's emphasis on action over dialogue and travel, but concluded: "Still, it appears that the designers didn't work too hard to inject much freshness, like a more intriguing story line or more realistic graphics. That's what makes Dynastic Hero a 'run of the mill' rather than a 'better' RPG."
