= Monster World IV =

1994 video game

- Cover art featuring different drawings of Asha and Pepelogoo
- Developer: Westone
- Publisher: Sega
- Artist: Maki Ohzora
- Composer: Jin Watanabe
- Series: Wonder Boy/Monster World
- Platform: Mega Drive
- Release: JP: April 1, 1994
- Genre: Platform
- Mode: Single-player

Monster World IV (Note: Monster World IV (モンスターワールドIV, Monsutā Wārudo Fō)) is an action-adventure platform game developed by Westone and released in Japan by Sega for the Mega Drive in April 1994.

It is the sixth game in the Wonder Boy series and the fourth game in the Monster World subseries, the other three of which can be identified by their Japanese names: Super Wonder Boy: Monster World for the Sega Mark III (a port of Wonder Boy in Monster Land), Monster World II: Dragon no Wana for the Game Gear (a port of Wonder Boy: The Dragon's Trap), and Wonder Boy V: Monster World III for the Mega Drive (released overseas as Wonder Boy in Monster World).

It was later released for the PlayStation 2 on March 8, 2007, as part of the Sega Ages 2500 series under the name Sega Ages 2500 Series Vol. 29: Monster World Complete Collection. (Note: Sega Ages 2500 Series Vol. 29: Monster World Complete Collection (セガエイジス2500シリーズ Vol.29 モンスターワールド コンプリートコレクション, Sega Eijisu Nisengohyaku Shirīzu Boryūmu Nijūkyū: Monsutā Wārudo Konpurīto Korekushon)) It was released on the Wii's Virtual Console service in Japan on January 15, 2008. An English-language version was released in North America and Europe for Virtual Console on May 10, 2012, with a release on Xbox Live Arcade and PlayStation Network to come on May 23, 2012. Monster World IV was the last Wonder Boy game to both be published by Sega and developed by Westone Bit Entertainment. A remake by Artdink, titled Wonder Boy: Asha in Monster World, was released in May 2021.

== Gameplay ==
Monster World IV is a mix of action-adventure, platforming, and RPG genres, in which the player traverses a 2D landscape fighting a variety of monsters as well as interacting with non-playable characters.

Expanding upon previous games in the series, Asha has the ability to swing her sword upward, downward, and forward while in midair, depending on which direction is pressed. She can also use her shield while standing by holding down.

Asha can summon her pet Pepelogoo to reach areas that she cannot on her own. By holding onto him, she can slow the descent of her jump (via his flying ability) or even perform a double-jump. Pepelogoo can also protect Asha from falling rocks, be used as a platform over lava geysers, and blow out fires that obstruct Asha's progress.

Equipment upgrades are purchased in the hub town. Armor increases Asha's pink life heart meter. Shields increase her defense and give her stat resistances to certain elements, such as fire or ice. Swords increase Asha's attack stats with critical effects depending on the sword.

Some items cannot be purchased and must be found in the temples and caverns that Asha must explore. Healing medicine will restore Asha's health or bring her back to life if she has Pepelogoo. Gold bars can be traded with the rich lady in town for in-game currency. And finally, there are 150 life drops hidden throughout the game. Collecting ten will add a blue life heart to the life meter.

Items can be permanently missed. Once an area's boss is defeated, that area is inaccessible for the rest of the game.

== Plot ==
The story involves a young girl named Asha, who, upon hearing spirits whisper on the wind pleading for help, embarks on a journey to find and help them. Along the way she becomes the master of a genie and adopts a small monster known as Pepelogoo.

=== Characters ===
- Asha - a young, green-haired girl dressed in Arabian-influenced nomadic gear. Sensitive to the presence of spirits, Asha is able to hear the pleas of the Elemental Spirits coming from Monster World, and ultimately journeys to become a warrior and free them.
- Pepelogoo - belongs to a race of small, spherical monsters who flap their ears to fly. While most Pepelogoos in Monster World are yellow, Asha's is blue. He is seen as more than just a curiosity to several people in Monster World; as in ancient days, the blue ones had been all but wiped out by people fearful of their magical abilities.
- Purapril XIII - descendant of Purapril from the previous Monster World games, and ruler of the kingdom. In the remake, her name is spelled as "Praprill" and provides a greater role by acting as the narrator to the game's prologue, as well as giving her boss form a new darker color scheme.
- The Sage of Save - an elderly man who travels across Monster World, popping up in unexpected places, and recording people's memories. Gameplay-wise, by talking to him, the player can save their progress so far. In the remake, as the player can save on the fly, he offers gameplay advice on the loading screens and in the in-game pause menu.
- The Lamp Spirit - a sarcastic spirit being who resides in an old oil lamp. He becomes Asha's companion and servant on her quest, which he treats as just another mundane activity he will do before he is (as with several classic genie stories) lost for another one thousand years. He is the one who transports Asha to and from Monster World.
- Elemental Spirits - the four Companions from the previous game:
  - Rotto - a young fire-breathing dragon, grandson to the Elder Dragon, who provided much-needed assistance in-and-around Begonia, the Dragon Village.
  - Shabo - a Grim Reaper-esque wraith who offered aid in the frozen wasteland of Childam, the Darkworld Village.
  - Hotta - a Dwarf, whose presence is located in the swampy area of Lilypad, the Dwarf Village.
  - Priscilla - a Fairy Sprite originally hailing from Alsedo, the Fairy Village. She previously appears in Wonder Boy in Monster World but has no major role.

== Legacy ==
Monster World IV was included as one of the 42 games on the Sega Genesis Mini. In August 2020, a full 3D remake of Monster World IV, titled Wonder Boy: Asha in Monster World, was announced. The game, which features 3D graphics, gameplay enhancements, new modes, and voice acting, was developed by Artdink for PlayStation 4, Nintendo Switch, and PC via Steam. It was released in May 2021 for Switch and PlayStation 4, and in June 2021 for PC, published by ININ Games in the West and G Choice in Japan. In July 2025, Bliss Brain also released the game worldwide for PlayStation 5, Xbox Series X/S and PC via Microsoft Store.
