= Positron (disambiguation) =

A positron is an elementary particle of antimatter.

Positron may also refer to:

- Positron (video game), the 1983 video game published by Micro Power
- Positron! Records, a Chicago-based independent record label
- Positron Corporation, an American nuclear medicine healthcare company
- "Positron", a 1993 trance track by Cygnus X
- Positron, a bicycle shifting system from Shimano
- Positron, a software development platform by Posit PBC

== See also ==
- Positron emission, the radioactive decay
- Positronic brain, the fictional device conceived by Isaac Asimov
