= Boxer's Road 2: The Real =

2006 video game

- Developer: Grand Prix
- Publisher: Ertain Corporation
- Platform: PlayStation Portable
- Release: JP: 28 September 2006
- Genres: Fighting, sports
- Modes: Single-player, multiplayer

Boxer's Road 2: The Real (Note: Japanese: ボクサーズロード2 ザ・リアル, Hepburn: Bokusāzu Rōdo 2: Za Riaru) is a 2006 video game for the PlayStation Portable. It is a sequel to Boxer's Road for the PlayStation. It was developed by Grand Prix and published by Ertain Corporation.

== Gameplay ==
Boxer's Road 2 is played by using the d-pad to move closer or further away, or to side step left or right, all relative to the opponent. The face buttons are all attacks, with each corresponding to a right or left hook or jab. The left trigger changes punches into uppercuts, and the right trigger allows the player to bob and weave. The game features either first person or third person viewpoint options.

== Development ==
Boxer's Road 2 was developed by Grand Prix Games. Most of the developers from the original game worked on the sequel.

The game worked with the Japan Professional Boxing Association (JPBA) and includes 77 gyms, and 139 boxers using their real names to be featured in the game.

== Release ==
Boxer's Road 2 was released on September 28, 2006 for the PlayStation Portable.

== Reception ==
Famitsu gave the game a score of 25 out of 40.
