= Riot Zone =

- Developers: Agenda Co., Ltd
- Publisher: Hudson Soft
- Platforms: TurboGrafx-CD, Wii (Virtual Console)
- Release: JP: February 26, 1993; NA: February 1993
- Genre: Beat 'em up action
- Mode: Single-player

Riot Zone, known in Japan as Crest of Wolf (狼的紋章(クレスト・オブ・ウルフ)), is a 1992, beat 'em up video game by Hudson Soft for the TurboGrafx-CD console. It was re-released on the Virtual Console for North America on January 14, 2008, in the PAL regions on January 18, 2008, and in Japan on April 1, 2008.

== Plot ==
In the beginning, the setting takes place in New York City where two men known as Hawk Takezaki and Tony Aldus met up with their chief Jim Hyde, and told him that they finally forced a villain known as Bossman to stay in a place called the DragonZone. The chief advised Hawk not to enter the DragonZone and head back home, but Hawk refused to do so. Before he immediately began traveling toward DragonZone and try to demolish it, in order to save a girl named Candy, Tony told Hawk that he will join him.

== Gameplay ==
Like Riot City, Riot Zone resembles Capcom's 1989 arcade hit, Final Fight, which is an archetypal side scrolling beat-em-up game. Players choose between two characters: Hawk, the blond-haired vigilante who has average statistics, and Tony, who is strong, but slow and has a break-dancing move. Player controls the chosen character from left to right through each level (most of which are split into three or more scenes), fighting with the enemy characters who appear, until they reach a confrontation with a stronger boss character at the end of the level. Once that boss is beaten, the player automatically moves on to the next stage. Enemies appear from both sides of the screen, and the player must defeat all of them to progress. If the player tries to simply travel through the levels without fighting, the screen will stop scrolling until all current enemies have been defeated, before allowing the player to continue progress. Enemies may move outside the confines of the screen, but players may not. Unlike Final Fight, there are no weapons to pick up along the way, but the player will only pick up items for points and health. Unlike Riot City, Riot Zone lacks multiplayer and instead of chiptune music, the TurboGrafx-CD allows it to play high-quality CD-DA music.

== Development ==
Riot Zone is a port of the 1991 arcade game Riot City developed by Westone Bit Entertainment and distributed by Sega. When Hudson Soft picked up the rights to the game for a home conversion to the TurboGrafx-16, they changed the title and character designs in a matter similar to what they have done with various ports of the Wonder Boy series to non-Sega consoles (such as the original Adventure Island on the NES or Dragon's Curse on the TurboGrafx-16). The development of the game was handled by Agenda Co. Ltd.
