= Rendering Ranger: R2 =

1995 video game

Rendering Ranger: R^{2}
- Developer: Rainbow Arts
- Publisher: Virgin Interactive Entertainment
- Producer: Thomas Brockhage
- Designer: Manfred Trenz
- Artists: Jørgen Trolle Ørberg; Stephan Lethaus; Tobias J. Richter
- Composers: Jesper Olsen; Stefan Kramer
- Platform: Super Famicom
- Release: JP: 17 November 1995
- Genre: Action
- Mode: Single-player

Rendering Ranger: R^{2} (Note: Japanese: レンダリング・レンジャーR^{2}, Hepburn: Rendaringu Renjā: R^{2}) is a 1995 side-scrolling action video game developed by Rainbow Arts and published by Virgin Interactive for the Super Famicom. It was released only in Japan, and has gone on to be one of the rarest Super Famicom titles in existence. In June 2022, Ziggurat Interactive announced that the game would be ported to Microsoft Windows, Nintendo Switch, PlayStation 4, and PlayStation 5, with Limited Run Games set to distribute copies for the Super Nintendo Entertainment System.

== Gameplay ==

Top: Run and gun boss fight.
Bottom: Shoot 'em up boss fight.

Players control the titular Rendering Ranger, a special forces soldier tasked with defending the Earth and its remaining inhabitants from a devastating alien invasion. A high score screen is present and there are many different types of laser guns to acquire throughout the post-apocalyptic adventure. The player can choose from three to seven lives. However, there are no continues so practice is essential to winning the game. The player can take five hits before losing a life but pits automatically make him lose a life. Weapons are found in floating orbs, and each color holds a different kind of gun.

== Development and release ==
The game was developed by Manfred Trenz, director of the Turrican series. This game was only released in Japan, but is entirely in English. The unreleased PAL/North American version of the game was to be called Targa. According to an interview with Trenz, he stated that the game was originally named as Targa, it featured hand-drawn graphics, and later it was changed to pre-rendered graphics following the success of Donkey Kong Country, hence the name change. By the time the game was finally finished, the only company interested in publishing it was the Japanese branch of Virgin Interactive.

The game was released exclusively in Japan on November 17, 1995. Only 10,000 copies were made for the game. It is a very rare game, and has become a sought-after collector's item. It is considered one of the rarest games for the Super Famicom, alongside such titles as Magical Pop'n. The 2016 mook, Perfect Guide of Nostalgic Super Famicom, listed it as the rarest title released for the system. On 13 January 2022, Ziggurat Interactive announced that they had acquired the rights to the game for a worldwide release.

== Reception ==
Reception

Review scores
Publication	Score
Famitsu	22/40
Jeuxvideo.com	17/20
M! Games	75%
Nintendo Life	9/10

On release, the game was scored a 22 out of 40 by a panel of four reviewers at Famitsu. Eurogamer writer Tom Massey described it as "Turrican meets Contra", and complained of screen inertia. Nintendo Life gave it a 90/100.
