= Boxer's Road =

1995 video game

- Developer: New Corporation
- Publisher: New Corporation
- Platform: PlayStation
- Release: JP: 8 September 1995
- Genres: Fighting, sports
- Mode: Single-player

Boxer's Road (Note: Japanese: ボクサーズ ロード, Hepburn: Bokusā Dōro) is a 1995 boxing simulation video game developed and published by New Corporation for the PlayStation. It was followed by the sequel Boxer's Road 2: The Real.

== Gameplay ==
Boxer's Road is a game which simulates an entire boxing career. It is a fully 3D polygonal game.

== Release ==
Boxer's Road was released in Japan on September 8, 1995. The game sold 400,000 copies. It was re-released under the "Playstation the Best" line on August 9, 1996, and on the PlayStation Network in Japan on July 26, 2007. It was re-released again for mobile phones in 2007 under the title Boxer's Road the MOBILE.

It was followed up by Boxer's Road 2, released for the PSP in 2005.

== Reception ==
Reception

Review scores
Publication	Score
Famitsu	9/10, 10/10, 9/10, 7/10
Dengeki PlayStation	80/100, 75/100, 85/100, 70/100

Next Generation gave it three stars out of five. They described the matches as "realistic", but "slow" due to game's sluggish controls. Noting that the game was released in Japan only, they also wrote that US import version with some improvements would be an interesting title.

Famitsu gave it a score of 35 out of 40. Ultima Generacion gave the game a score of 60 out of 100. German magazine Mega Fun gave it a score of 86%.

Play gave it a score of 82%.
