= Whomp 'Em =

1991 video game

Whomp 'Em Saiyūki World 2: Tenjōkai no Majin
- North American cover art
- Developer: Jaleco
- Publisher: Jaleco
- Designer: Jirocho Nobu
- Composer: Tsukasa Tawada
- Platform: Nintendo Entertainment System
- Release: JP: December 7, 1990; NA: March 1991
- Genre: Platform
- Mode: Single-player

Whomp 'Em, also known in Japan as Saiyūki World 2: Tenjōkai no Majin (西遊記ワールド2 天上界の魔神, lit. "Saiyūki World 2: Evil Spirit of Heaven") is a platform game released by Jaleco for the Nintendo Entertainment System in December 1990 in Japan and March 1991 in North America. It is named after Wampum.

== Gameplay ==
The player can navigate to the top of this towerlike cliff using one of the totems.

Whomp 'Em is a platform game with some similarities to the Mega Man and Mario series.

After completing the first stage, the player can play the other six in any order. Each of the stages revolves around elements, such as fire and water. After each stage, the player gains a new weapon, much like in the original Mega Man series, which was extremely popular at the time. Both Whomp 'Em and the prior Saiyūki World (which was an adaptation of Wonder Boy in Monster Land) are based on the Journey to the West novel.

== Release ==
The game was released in Japan for the Family Computer on December 7, 1990. The North American version of the game removed references to Journey to the West, by editing the game's sprite and graphics. The first stage music was also slightly modified and included a percussion track using the NES noise channel. The protagonist in the original was Sun Wukong, but is now a Native American, and the setting was changed to the Old West.

== Reception ==
Reception

Review scores
Publication	Score
AllGame	3.5/5
Famitsu	23 / 40

The North American video gaming magazine Nintendo Power gave Whomp 'Em an overall rating of 3.1 out of 5 in its May 1991 review. Allgame editor Brett Alan Weiss praised the game, describing it as "a solid platform game with crisp, clear graphics, peppy music, excellent controls, and a heroic character".
