= Westone Bit Entertainment =

Japanese video game developer (1986–2014)

Westone Bit Entertainment Inc.
- Native name

Japanese name
- Kanji: 株式会社ウエストン·ビット·エンタテインメント
- Formerly: Escape; Westone
- Founded: May 1986; 40 years ago
- Founders: Ryuichi Nishizawa; Michishito Ishizuka
- Defunct: October 1, 2014
- Fate: Bankruptcy liquidation
- Successor: LAT Corporation
- Headquarters: Sumida, Tokyo, Japan
- Website: westone.co.jp

Westone Bit Entertainment Inc. (株式会社ウエストン·ビット·エンタテインメント, Kabushiki-gaisha Uesuton Bitto Entateinmento) was a video game developer founded in May 1986, based in Mukoujima, Sumida-ku, Tokyo. They were most famous for the Wonder Boy/Monster World series. Originally called Escape (エスケープ, Esukēpu), the company was renamed to Westone as the word Escape made them sound unreliable. The company's name was changed yet again to Westone Bit Entertainment in April 2000. The chief publisher was Ryuichi Nishizawa. The company went bankrupt and entered the liquidation process on October 1, 2014. Westone Bit Entertainment was greatly associated with Sega during its existence, with Sega publishing a majority of their games. Currently, the intellectual property rights to Westone Bit Entertainment's games are owned by LAT Corporation, who licenses the Wonder Boy series to external developers with Sega.

The Westone name is derived from the first characters of the names of company founders, Ryuuichi Nishizawa (Nishi = West) and Michishito Ishizuka (Ishi = Stone).

== Games ==
- Wonder Boy (1986)
- Jaws (1987)
- Wonder Boy in Monster Land (1987)
- Wonder Boy III: Monster Lair (1988)
- Appare! Gateball (1988)
- Wonder Boy III: The Dragon's Trap (1989)
- Mashin Eiyuden Wataru Gaiden (1990)
- Aoi Blink (1990)
- Aurail (1990)
- Wonder Boy in Monster World (1991)
- Power Eleven (1991)
- Riot City (1991)
- Riot Zone (1992)
- Monster World IV (1994)
- Blood Gear (1994)
- Mega Bomberman (1994)
- Dungeon Explorer (1995)
- Kekkon (1995)
- Dark Half (1996)
- Wolkenkratzer: Shinpan no Tou (1996)
- Willy Wombat (1997)
- Soukou Kihei Votoms Gaiden: Ao no Kishi Berserga Monogatari (1997)
- Sotsugyou Album (1998)
- Sotsugyou III: Wedding Bell (1998)
- Sotsugyou M: Male Graduation - Seitokaichou no Kareinaru Inbou (1998)
- Wachenröder (1998)
- Milano no Arbeit Collection (1999)
- Cyber Team in Akihabara: PataPies! (1999)
- Di Gi Charat Fantasy (2001)
- Reel Fishing: Wild (2001)
- Neon Genesis Evangelion: Ayanami Raising Project (2001)
- Neon Genesis Evangelion: Ayanami Raising Project with Asuka Supplementing Project (2003)
- Relaxuma: Ojama Shitemasu 2 Shuukan (2005)
- Secret of Evangelion (2006)
- Clockwork Aquario (2021)
