= Neon Genesis Evangelion (video game) =

1999 Nintendo 64 fighting game

- Japanese box art
- Developer: BEC
- Publisher: Bandai
- Director: Shin Unozawa
- Producer: Takeo Isogai
- Designers: Kōzō Igarashi; Yutaka Nagayama
- Programmer: Yutaka Nagayama
- Composer: Jun Enoki
- Series: Neon Genesis Evangelion
- Platform: Nintendo 64
- Release: JP: June 25, 1999
- Genre: Fighting
- Mode: Single-player

Neon Genesis Evangelion (Note: Japanese: 新世紀エヴァンゲリオン, Hepburn: Shinseiki Evangerion; "New Century Gospel"), also referred to as Neon Genesis Evangelion 64, is a 1999 fighting game published by Bandai for the Nintendo 64 exclusively in Japan. It is based on the Gainax anime series Neon Genesis Evangelion and the 1997 film that serves as its conclusion, The End of Evangelion. Players control a mech named Evangelion Unit-01 to destroy a race of aliens known as the Angels before they eradicate the rest of the human race. The game is known for its alterations to the source material in order to make its dystopian and unsettling atmosphere suitable for an action game, and features unique endings and plotlines not present in other Evangelion media.

Evangelion 64 was developed by BEC, a company formed as a joint venture between Bandai and Human Entertainment, and supervised by Gainax. The game received mixed reviews, though it was a moderate commercial success. Several critics identified its graphics and cutscenes as being of higher quality than other games on the Nintendo 64, with some calling it one of the system's most technically impressive titles. However, reviewers were primarily critical of its lack of interactivity, reliance on button-tapping sequences, and limited appeal to players unfamiliar with the series.

== Gameplay ==
The player using the Evangelion to fight the Angel, Sachiel, in the first stage

Neon Genesis Evangelion is based on the anime of the same name, taking place in 2015, where 50% of Earth's population has been wiped out by a catastrophe known as the Second Impact. The organization Nerv assigns three teenage pilots—Shinji Ikari, Rei Ayanami, and Asuka Langley Soryu—to pilot cyborgs called Evangelions to destroy alien beings known as Angels before they eradicate the rest of the human race.

The player controls one of these pilots through a series of levels, each being based on a specific episode of the anime. The pilots' faces can be seen during battle and change their facial expression in reaction to events just like in the original anime. The Evangelion must defeat an enemy Angel through melee attacks, while preventing the Angel from inflicting damage on the Evangelion. The Evangelion begins with standard kicking and punching attacks; later levels allow it to use weapons such as the progressive knife.

The player has to be aware of several other factors in battle. If the Evangelion is at low health, it can become "berserk" and temporarily increase its strength and power. Also, the Evangelion is powered by an umbilical cable. If the cord is severed by taking too much damage, the Evangelion will only have five minutes of battery power to operate. Additionally, a temporary shield called an "AT Field" can be generated to defend against attacks, an ability shared with the Angels. Through a quick time event, the player can neutralize the opposing Angel's AT Field with their own, making the latter unable to use AT Field for the rest of the battle.

In addition to the health bar, a "synchronization rate" that shows the bond between the pilot and mech is indicated by a graph on the screen. It increases with successful attacks, giving the player more powerful attacks, including the ability to deploy AT Field. Outside the main game, meeting certain conditions will result in unlocking additional gameplay modes. Simulation mode is a shooting gallery minigame where players use the Evangelion to shoot formations of Angels. An incomplete 2-player versus mode is present in the game, and can be unlocked after fulfilling certain in-game requirements using a specific button combination. The player can also play as Rei and Asuka. After progressing through the game, players are given a mode to view 3D models of all characters in the game.

== Development and release ==
The Neon Genesis Evangelion anime was a hugely popular series after its release in Japan making video game adaptions inevitable. Neon Genesis Evangelion 64 was developed for the Nintendo 64 by BEC, a video game development subsidiary of Japanese toymaker Bandai. BEC was founded in 1990 as a joint venture between Bandai and Human Entertainment, with most of its staff being employed from Human's game design school. Evangelion 64 is a loose adaptation of the Gainax-produced anime series and its 1997 film adaptation The End of Evangelion.

Most video game adaptions of robot anime series tend to be action-focused, but Evangelion 64 instead opted to reproduce scenes from the anime, which, depending on the player's choices, could produce a different outcome. The game is known for its heavy alterations to the source material to make the anime's dystopian and unsettling atmosphere suitable for an action game; as such, it includes plotlines and endings that are not present in other Evangelion media. Gainax supervised its development, with company co-founder Shin Unozawa being assigned to project director. Bandai worked to implement most of the characters from the series into the game, though several were relegated to small background cameos. The game's audio was created by Jun Enoki, who replicated a number of musical themes from the anime in MIDI. However, the game lacks the song "Fly Me to the Moon" from the show's closing sequence. The audio incorporates archive footage of the characters' voices from the anime, which was limited in use by the low storage size of N64 cartridges.

Evangelion 64 was announced in October 1998 and demonstrated at the Tokyo Game Show the same month, where it generated the longest player lines at the tradeshow. The game was released in Japan on June 25, 1999, and was bundled with a pack of three Evangelion-themed cards that were compatible with Carddass card vending machines for amusement arcades. A strategy guide published by Kadokawa Shoten was also released for the game that included an overview of each mech in the game, as well as gameplay tips. Bandai's North American division considered releasing Evangelion 64 in the United States if it deemed its gameplay suitable for Western audiences. Ultimately, the game was not released outside of Japan.

== Reception ==
Reception

Review scores
Publication	Score
GameFan	151/300
GameSpot	5.6/10
Hyper	61/100
N64 Magazine	61%
Total!	3/5
Gamers' Republic	B+
X64	40%

Famitsu reports that Neon Genesis Evangelion 64 sold over 38,000 copies by the end of 1999. Reviewers were primarily critical of the game's lack of player involvement. Christian Nutt of GameSpot believed its redeeming qualities were overshadowed by the limited interactivity: "The serious problem here is that the game fails to do what a game should do — deliver an engaging play experience." Nutt disliked its combat and button tapping sequences. N64 Magazine writer Jes Bickham had the same opinion and showed disappointment in its quality. Nick O'Shea, a reviewer for Hyper, described the game as "interactive anime" with limited moves in combat and battles that often were reduced to "button mashing". Reviewers for GameFan echoed these same complaints, and suggested it would have been much better as a standard fighting game.

Multiple reviewers have found Evangelion 64 impressive from a technical perspective. Gamers' Republic, which listed it as being among the best import games in its 1999 Video Game Buyers Guide and Y2K Preview, commended Bandai for successfully translating the anime's atmosphere and drama into a video game. Nutt showed admiration towards the voice acting and graphics for being "surprisingly well represented" by the Nintendo 64's limited capabilities. Several believed only fans of the series would enjoy it. Lionel Coen, writing in X64, remarked that those with no knowledge of the series would have very limited interest in the game while those who are fans would delight in seeing scenes from the series translated into a video game. Bruno Sol of Superjuegos also commended the title for faithfully reproducing most of the events from the anime series and the film Death & Rebirth.

Retrospective commentary has been equally mixed. Some reviewers regretted that the game was not released outside of Japan. Play magazine went so far as to say that it was "sheer madness" that the game was not released outside of Japan and listed it as the 10th best anime game of all time. Daniel Quesada of Hobby Consolas felt it was a good adaption of the series with well-designed graphics, and more interesting than the majority of Evangelion video games. Others were more critical, such as USgamer, which called the game mediocre and suggested Evangelion fans should play Super Robot Wars V instead. Kotaku's Richard Eisenbeis was critical of its button-tapping sequences and the slow movement speed of the Evangelion. Writing for Hardcore Gaming 101, Brian Crimmins found its cutscenes and graphics impressive for the console, and saw it as a game that could have potentially given the Nintendo 64 an edge over its competitors. Despite this, Crimmins was critical of the game's handling of its source material, particularly removing the anime's unsettling and psychologically dampening tone in favor of one that was more lighthearted. He described it as being "best remembered as a technical curiosity, and perhaps as a lesson in how to adapt existing franchises to video game form".
