= Positron Corporation =

American healthcare company

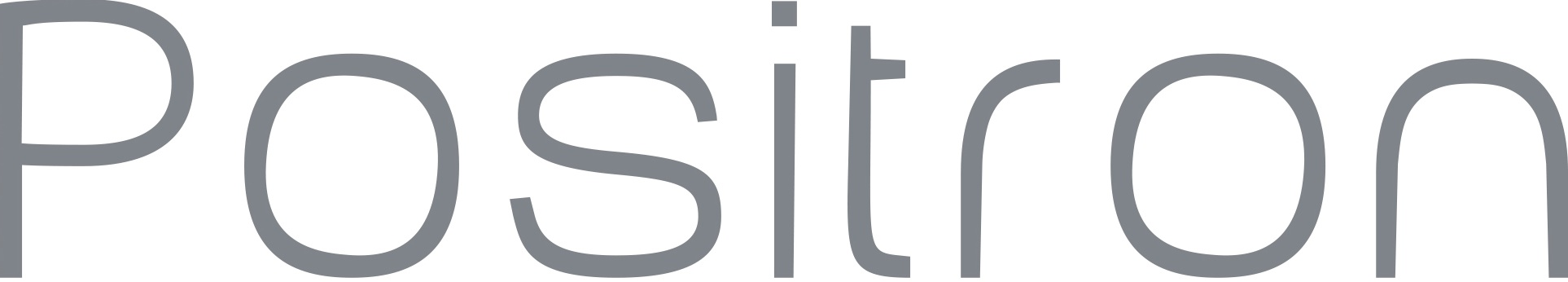
- Type: Public
- Traded as: OTCID Basic: POSC
- Industry: Healthcare
- Founded: (1983)
- Headquarters: North Tonawanda, NY, U.S.
- Products: Nuclear medical PET imaging devices
- Website: www.positron.com

Positron Corporation is an American nuclear medicine healthcare company specializing in cardiac Positron Emission Tomography (PET) imaging. Positron is headquartered in Niagara Falls, New York in addition to its clinical and technical cardiovascular PET training facility.

The company's products and services enable healthcare providers to diagnose cardiac disease and improve patient outcomes. Positron Corporation is a public company and traded on the Financial Industry Regulatory Authority, Inc.'s OTC Bulletin Board under the ticker symbol POSC.

== History ==
Positron was founded in 1983 as a research and development company.

== Company development ==
After its founding in 1983, Positron debuted a new time-of-flight tomograph called the POSICAM. Posicam used barium fluoride for the scintillation detector and was primarily used by researchers interested in cardiac imaging. In 1985, the FDA approved the POSICAM system for marketing and the following year, Positron began commercial operations. The FDA later gave approval to Positron to begin marketing its HZ PET imaging system in 1991. Positron received patents for aspects of its HZ and HZL POSICAM systems in 1993 along with FDA approval to market HZL.

In 2005, Positron entered into a joint venture contract with Neusoft Medical Systems Co., Inc. of Shenyang, China for a jointly owned company to pursue the manufacturing of PET imaging equipment called Neusoft Positron Medical Systems Co. Ltd. The following year, Positron acquired a manufacturer/developer of nuclear imaging devices called IS2 Medical Systems, Inc. based in Ontario, Canada. Positron acquired DoseShield Corporation, a developer and manufacturer of automated radiopharmaceutical technology/systems in 2008. In 2009, Positron and its partner Neusoft Medical Systems received FDA approval to sell and distribute their Attrius PET system.

=== Attrius ===
The Attrius is Positron's main cardiac PET system that the company provides in nuclear medicine that was launched in 2010. The system uses software to monitor coronary artery overlay display and open architecture for new protocol development and customization and motion correction. Other products include PosiRx, a system that simplifies and controls the procedures associated with the preparation and delivery of radiopharmaceuticals used in molecular imaging and PosiStar, Positron's customer care plan for Attrius.

== Awards ==
- Positron Corporation is the winner of the 2010 North American Molecular Imagine Systems New Product Innovation Award given by the research firm Frost & Sullivan.
