= Wonder Boy in Monster Land =

1987 video game

- Cover artwork for the Master System version featuring Tom-Tom fighting Red Knight, with bats in the background
- Developers: Westone; Sega (Master System)
- Publisher: Sega
- Director: Ryuichi Nishizawa
- Producer: Ryuichi Nishizawa
- Designer: Ryuichi Nishizawa
- Programmers: Ryuichi Nishizawa; Michishito Ishizuka
- Artists: Hiromi Suzuko; Rie Ishizuka
- Composer: Shinichi Sakamoto
- Series: Wonder Boy
- Platform: Arcade: Master System, Famicom, Commodore 64, PC Engine, Amstrad CPC, ZX Spectrum, Amiga, Atari ST, mobile phone
- Release: July 1987: Arcade; JP: July 1987 PC Engine; JP: October 30, 1987 Master System; JP: January 31, 1988; NA: August 1988; EU: 1988 Famicom; JP: November 11, 1988 C64, CPC, Amiga, Atari ST; EU: 1989 Mobile; JP: December 1, 2004; NA: June 8, 2005 (as Super Adventure Island)
- Genre: Platform
- Mode: Single player
- Arcade system: Sega System 2

Wonder Boy in Monster Land, known by its original arcade release as Wonder Boy: Monster Land, (Note: Japanese: ワンダーボーイモンスターランド, Hepburn: Wandā Bōi Monsutā Rando) and also known as Super Wonder Boy to Monster Land is a platform video game developed by Westone and released by Sega in Japanese arcades in 1987 and for the Master System in 1988, with a number of other home computer and console ports following. The game is the sequel to the 1986 game Wonder Boy and takes place eleven years after the events in the previous game. After enjoying over a decade of peace on Wonder Land following the defeat of the evil King by Tom-Tom, later bestowed the title "Wonder Boy", a fire-breathing dragon called the MEKA dragon appeared; he and his minions conquered Wonder Land, turning it into "Monster Land". The people, helpless due to their lack of fighting skill, call for Wonder Boy, now a teenager, to destroy the monsters and defeat the MEKA dragon. Players control Wonder Boy through twelve linear levels as he makes his way through Monster Land to find and defeat the MEKA dragon. Players earn gold by defeating enemies and buy weapons, armor, footwear, magic, and other items to help along the way.

The arcade version of Wonder Boy in Monster Land amassed moderate sales, the Master System version received overall positive reviews in all aspects and has been highly regarded as one of the better titles in the Master System library. Reviews praised the game for its colorful graphics, smooth controls, gameplay, and replay value. Other ports received mixed reception: criticisms included very slow multi-load times on the home computer versions, sub-quality sound, and smaller play areas. The arcade version would later be re-released in emulated form as a digital download for Wii, PlayStation 3 and Xbox 360. It had a sequel, Wonder Boy III: The Dragon's Trap, released for the Master System in 1989.

== Plot ==
The plot of Wonder Boy in Monster Land follows the events in its predecessor, Wonder Boy. The game's main protagonist is a young boy named Bock Lee Temjin, known to his friends as "Tom-Tom". In Wonder Boy Tom-Tom's girlfriend Tanya was kidnapped by the "evil King" and was taken to his woodland kingdom; Tom-Tom set out to the kingdom, defeated the evil King, and saved Tanya. Word spread throughout Wonder Land about Tom-Tom's quest, and people bestowed upon him the title of "Wonder Boy".

Meanwhile, the Evil King was resurrected as the MEKA Dragon, who in turn established a powerful army. Additionally, the MEKA Dragon placed mind-controlling bracelets on the land’s various inhabitants and forced them to do his bidding. He also hired the Brothers of Knight (Red and Blue) to do his bidding. Tom-Tom heard of this incident and set off to kill the MEKA Dragon. The game ends with Tom-Tom defeating the dragon, leading up to a cliffhanger for the third game.

== Gameplay ==
In Wonder Boy in Monster Land, players control Wonder Boy as he destroys the monsters in Monster Land and defeats the MEKA dragon. When the player begins the game, Wonder Boy starts out in the City of Wonder Land without any items or gold, but to give him a chance, at the beginning of the game, the city's mayor gives him a sword and a revival potion and sets him off on his own. The game is divided into twelve levels, and each of them has its own unique features, items, monsters, and secrets. These levels include towns, valleys, deserts, islands, and castles. Players use the D-pad to move Wonder Boy on the main screen, to enter doors by pressing upward, and to use Magic Weapons by pressing downward. The D-pad is also used to select between various items when in a shop. Players also have two buttons: one which makes Wonder Boy attack with his sword and buy items in the shop; and one which makes Wonder Boy jump and skip through storylines.

Wonder Boy has a life meter which consists of a series of red hearts; he starts the game with five red hearts. Whenever he sustains damage those hearts turn black. When all the hearts turn black, Wonder Boy dies, and the game ends. Players score points whenever Wonder Boy defeats enemies and collects certain treasures, and at certain point intervals Wonder Boy receives an additional life heart. Players earn gold throughout the game in order to purchase weapons, magic weapons, and other items in shops and rooms. Gold is obtained from enemies, while some are hidden in odd places such as trees and clouds. The game has an "Hourglass Timer" on the top of the screen; whenever the Hourglass Timer runs out, Wonder Boy loses some life. The Hourglass Timer can be refilled by collecting hourglasses or by visiting hospitals or taverns. In the ZX Spectrum version of the game, a candle represents the timer.

Wonder Boy, in his weakest form, defeats an enemy in the City of Wonder Land.

In the Master System version of the game, pressing the pause button on the console takes players to the Status Screen which primarily shows what items they currently have. Other information displayed in the Status Screen include types and strengths of weapons and armor equipped; gold; life remaining; special items collected; and types of "Magic Weapons" collected and their quantities. Magic Weapons include bombs that roll on the ground, fireballs that fly through the air, small tornadoes that run on the ground and attack enemies, and "thunder flash" which damages all enemies on the screen. In the game's other versions except for Famicom version, all gameplay information is displayed on the left and top edges of the screen; there is no need to access a separate screen.

Throughout the game, the player must investigate the surroundings through finding and entering doors. These doors contain shops where players can buy equipment, rooms which provide additional information needed in the quest, traps which contain powerful enemies, and exits to the next level which can be opened after finding a key. Some of the doors in the game are hidden and can only be found through trial and error. At the beginning of the game, shops are visible and are clearly marked with the appropriate signs. Later on in the game, as Wonder Boy gets closer to the MEKA Dragon, the shop doors become unmarked while others are traps set by the level's bosses; near the end of the game, many of the shops are invisible and contain more powerful weapons. There are four types of shops throughout the game: boot shops allow the player to buy boots which make Wonder Boy jump higher and run faster, armor shops contain armor which makes Wonder Boy incur less damage from enemy attacks, shield shops contain shields which allow him to repel fire from enemies, and magical shops allow players to purchase Magic Weapons. There are also various rooms in the game which the player can enter and receive additional assistance in the quest: taverns where players can buy drinks and receive information from the bartender, Fortune Teller rooms where players may receive information about future events, and hospitals which allow players to refill their life meter and Hourglass Timer for a small price. Other rooms contain a boss in which the player must defeat to get the key to the next level, to earn additional gold, or to upgrade to a more powerful sword.

There are many items and treasures located throughout the game. Many of these treasures are obtained by defeating enemies and include the following: gold; golden water jugs, necklaces, scales of justice, harps, mirrors, and crowns which increase the player's score; hourglasses which refill the Hourglass Timer; hearts which refill the life meter; gauntlets which temporarily double Wonder Boy's attack power; helmets which temporarily provide additional protection from enemy attacks; Wing Boots which allow Wonder Boy to fly over obstacles; Revival Potions; and magic mantles which make Wonder Boy temporarily invisible. Other special items hidden in the game which the player must find include letters, the flute, various charms, the bell, and the ruby.

== Development ==
The arcade version, released in Japan as Wonder Boy: Monster Land, ran on the System 2 hardware.

Wonder Boy in Monster Land was created by Ryuchi Nishizawa and Michishisto Ishizuka, two of the three members of a newly founded company called Escape. After the release of the first Wonder Boy game, they rebranded the company as "Westone": the first letter in Nishizawa's name means "west", while the first on Ishizuka's name means "stone". Nishizawa, originally an arcade game developer, was trying to take advantage of the quickly emerging role-playing video game genre, with games such as The Black Onyx, Wizardry, and Dragon Quest. He tried to create a game that fused together arcade and RPG elements. Two earlier games Nishizawa had played which fused arcade and RPG elements were The Tower of Druaga and Dragon Buster from Namco, but he was "irritated" with how those games were designed. He also had an issue with there being "no one to talk to" during the dungeons in Wizardry as well as the stages in The Tower of Druaga and Dragon Buster.

The jungle backdrop was overhauled and replaced with a medieval one with castles and caves. As with RPGs, he intended for the player to start with no items or strength, and for players to buy items, spells, health, and better equipment. Later in the game's development, Shinichi Sakamoto came on board to compose its soundtrack; in an overview of the series by IGN, they said that the music "was a sigh of relief for those still haunted by the repetitive loops of the arcade original", adding that it contributed to the RPG style and that would establish the standard for all future Wonder Boy games in the series.

== Ports and remakes ==
The game would be published by Sega in 1987 and released in Japanese arcades. It ran on a Sega System 2 board based on a Z80 processor that runs at 4 MHz, with audio provided by two SN76489 (also known as SN76496) chips that run at 4 MHz each. It used raster standard graphics and monaural sound. Upon its release for the arcades in Japan in 1987, Wonder Boy: Monster Land had slow sales, but it would eventually pick up to become a decent seller.

Before Sega published it on its own console, Hudson obtained the rights and program from Escape (Westone) and published it on the PC Engine under the name Bikkuriman World in October 1987. Since Hudson did not have the rights for the Wonder Boy franchise, the story and graphics were changed to fit the Bikkuriman franchise instead, while keeping the same gameplay. Sega ported the game to its Master System console in 1988, where in Japan it was titled Super Wonder Boy: Monster World. Elsewhere, it was faithfully released as Wonder Boy in Monster Land, though there exists a cartridge variant in North America with the label Super Wonder Boy Super Monster Land. Jaleco published a Famicom port in Japan in 1988 titled Saiyūki World, developed by NMK, which spawned an independently created sequel, Saiyūki World 2, released in North America as Whomp 'Em. It was also ported by Images Software for the Amiga, Atari ST, Commodore 64, Amstrad CPC, and ZX Spectrum and published by Activision in 1989. The Activision-published version bore the title of Super Wonder Boy in Monster Land on their packaging artwork. Hudson Soft released a version of the game titled Super Adventure Island for mobile phones on June 8, 2005. The Master System version was released for the Wii's Virtual Console service in Japan on December 14, 2008, in Europe on January 23, 2009, and in North America on January 26, 2009. Sega released the arcade version for the Virtual Console, PlayStation Network, Xbox Live Arcade (along with The Revenge of Shinobi, Alex Kidd in Miracle World, the arcade port of Super Hang-On, Monster World IV, and Wonder Boy in Monster World) as part of its third Sega Vintage Collection package in May 2012.

== Reception ==
Reception
Publication	Score							
Publication	Arcade	AMI	AST	C64	PCE	MS	VC	ZX
AllGame						4.5/5	4.5/5	
Amiga Action		52%						
Amiga Format		51%						
Amiga Joker		73%						
Amiga User International		65%						
C+VG						9/10		
Crash								88%
CU Amiga		41%						
Datormagazin				8/10				
Dragon						4.5/5		
Génération 4			88%					
IGN							7.5/10	
MicroHobby								42/60
PC Engine Fan					19.76/30			
Power Play		80%	80%	80%				
Sinclair User	8/10							90%
The Games Machine			88%	71%				
Your Sinclair								75%
Zero			85%					
Zzap!64		36%		68%				

In Japan, Game Machine listed Wonder Boy in Monster Land on their October 1, 1987 issue as being the third most-successful table arcade unit of the fortnight. Sinclair User magazine gave the arcade game a positive review, published in January 1989, calling it a "highly enjoyable" game.

The Master System version of the game was reviewed in the June 1988 issue of Computer and Video Games, which gave it an overall score of 9 out of 10. It described the game as a "total mix of arcade, strategy and adventure" with "role playing elements" such as "interaction with other characters and the ability to develop your character". It further stated that the "graphics rate as some of the best seen to date on a Sega game" and the "playability is supreme", concluding that it pushes its game design "to new horizons, all of which makes for longterm playability and interest". It was also reviewed in the April 1989 issue of Dragon by Hartley, Patricia, and Kirk Lesser in "The Role of Computers" column. The reviewers called it "a good game with a bad name", considered the game play superb, and concluded that the game "is one of SEGA's classic products". They stated that the arcade and role-playing action elements combine to make it "a truly original and enjoyable game" and that Sega has "done an excellent job" overall, giving the game 4½ out of 5 stars. Allgame also gave the game 4½ out of 5 stars, with reviewer Jonathan Sutyak describing it as "one of the best games I have ever played on the Master System". IGN in 2009 described the Virtual Console release as an "interesting platformer/RPG hybrid" game.

The ZX Spectrum version of Wonder Boy in Monster Land received preview coverage in Your Sinclair magazine. They praised the new additions made to the game that separated it from Wonder Boy; they called the game "a good arcade adventure with a smattering of strategy thrown in". The magazine reviewed the game four months later. The reviewer noted the diverse level designs and many "surprises" the player will encounter, and they praised the game's learning curve, saying that it "is well thought out and you really feel as if you made some progress before you die". It was criticized for its long multi-load times on the ZX Spectrum, its jumping mechanics in which the character "floats around", and the graphics which was not as good as its predecessor. The reviewer called Wonder Boy in Monster Land "a souped-up version of Wonderboy, which improves much on the original theory but at a slight cost to gameplay". Reviewers from UK-based magazine The Games Machine called it "probably the best conversion you could expect on the Spectrum". Crash magazine praised the ZX Spectrum version of the game for its detailed sprites and smooth movements, playability, and combat system. The reviewer further commended the game for the differences that set it apart from the original Wonder Boy game, citing the cartoon-like feel and the vast arrays of enemies and items; just as in Your Sinclair, it was criticized for its slow multi-loading. Overall, the reviewer said the game is "great fun for the experienced games player or the person just starting out in the Spectrum world". Sinclair User magazine praised its gameplay, citing the ability to stab enemies with a sword, to collect gold and items left behind, and to go into shops and pubs and buy equipment. Further praise went to the colorful and detailed graphics and animations, though they said they tend not to perform well in more complex background settings. Spanish magazine MicroHobby said that the ZX Spectrum version brought nothing new from its arcade counterpart, but the execution was good; they lauded the game's graphics and its challenging and addictive gameplay, but they criticized it for its lack of originality.

The Commodore 64 and Atari ST versions of Wonder Boy in Monster Land also received similar praise from gaming magazines. The Games Machine praised the Atari ST version but criticized the Commodore 64 version. The reviewers said the former "is not only playable, but the graphics are the nearest to the arcade machine you're going to get"; however, they said the graphics in the latter, while colorful, were too block-like and ruined its overall presentation. Reviewers from Zzap!64 criticized the Commodore 64 version, saying that this version is only slightly better and more playable than the Amiga version. Moreover, they said this version also suffered from repetitive gameplay and "inefficient multi-load", though an improvement from the Amiga version. Zero gave a fair assessment of the Atari ST version, appreciating the "cutesy" and cartoon-like graphics and addicting gameplay, which the reviewer said is "very easy to get into and very hard to put down"; they criticized the game's lack of any save features, saying that some of the gameplay gets repetitive after a while. Swedish magazine Datormagazin acclaimed the Commodore 64 version in most aspects. They lauded its graphics for being simplistic but clean, but they noted that they were not sensational. They criticized the game for its music, which they said can become annoying after a while, and for its lack of save points. Overall, they gave a positive review, saying that it "is a perfect example of how to make a game that is fairly simple to play but still is fairly advanced".

The Amiga version of Wonder Boy in Monster Land received mixed responses, but most reviews were negative. CU Amiga magazine expressed disappointment over the major change in the gameplay and the protagonist himself from the game's predecessor. The review also criticized sharply the game's poor graphics and character sprites, saying that "many of the characters are short and stumpy", that the background resembles that of Boulder Dash, and that Wonder Boy "is as wide as he is tall". Other criticisms included substandard screen scrolling, terrible gameplay due to the game's slowness, and that the actual gameplay area has been drastically reduced in size to include gameplay statistics such as the life meter and score displays. IGN heavily criticized the Amiga version 20 years after its release, saying how Wonder Boy was depicted as "a diaper-clad baby". Amiga Format similarly gave the game poor ratings, including the small gameplay area as a result of displaying the other statistics, sound that is substandard to the Amiga computer's expectations, the lack of a "high score" feature, and limited continues (as opposed to the arcade version which had unlimited continues). The reviewer said that "the game hasn't been programmed to make use of any of the Amiga's features" and that it "is another in the sadly increasing number of games that has simply been ported over from the first conversion, so that none of the features that make Amiga games stand out are included". Zzap!64 complained about the version's "beepy" sound and the very slow multi-load times, saying that the player may spend more time waiting for the game to load levels than play it. It also noted the lack of detail and variety in the graphics which did not make up for the slow multi-load times; the reviewer said that the enemies looked "about as dangerous as a dead tortoise". Other reviews from computer magazines gave the Amiga version of the game more positive reviews. Amiga User International praised the game's graphics, which they said were translated from the arcade version near-perfectly. It also appreciated the game's cartoon-style graphics, which said befits the game well. However, the review noticed that the game's code came from the Atari ST version, which, as noted in the other reviews, resulted in choppy scrolling and a shrunken gameplay area: something which the Amiga could do "perfectly smoothly with one hand tied behind its back". The review also criticized its slow multi-load times and high retail price. German magazine Amiga Joker liked the game's "candy-like graphics" and gameplay style, which they said compared to the title The Great Giana Sisters. However, the reviewers criticized it for its choppy scrolling and sound, of which they said "David Whittaker has already produced much better sound".

== Legacy ==
Wonder Boy in Monster Land received additional coverage years after its release. A 2004 review from Honest Gamers highly lauded its gameplay, challenge, and sound. It noted that while the game starts easy, the difficulty increases at a decent rate and involves good general gameplay skills that serve to add to the gameplay value. The reviewer praised the sound for being simple yet very effective, saying that it "is the ultimate compliment to pay a video game score" and comparing it to other Master System titles such as Alex Kidd. A 2008 IGN feature listed the game as one of "The 7 Master System Games You Need"; the reviewer said the game "is one of the finest adventures in a long series of [Wonder Boy] games", praising its brightly colored graphics and character sprites, and its sound. IGN had its sequel, Wonder Boy III: The Dragon's Trap, at No. 8 on their list, just missing also being featured.

The game received further reviews and general praise upon its release to the Virtual Console in 2009. Website Nintendo Life praised the game's controls for being smooth and responsive, especially for such an old game. The review appreciated its graphics, especially in its sharpness and usage of color; it further lauded the game's upbeat sound that complements the game nicely, the varied level designs and gameplay elements such as the need to answer questions from some bosses, and its overall execution. It said that the game is one of the better Master System titles that still plays good today. IGN called Wonder Boy in Monster Land one of the best games on the Master System, mainly because of its unique balance of platforming and RPG elements, which the reviewer calls "a winning formula". It said that the game is an improvement over its Adventure Island-like predecessor, replacing the "fruit gauge" with an hourglass timer while retaining other elements such as finding invisible items and discovering secret areas. The review mentioned that the game should appeal to fans from the days of 8-bit and the Master System.

Allgame gave positive reviews of the game. It said that game includes everything from hidden items, simplistic gameplay, fun and replay value, and basic but good-looking graphics.
