= Wonder Boy III: Monster Lair =

1988 video game

- Arcade flyer
- Developers: Westone (Arcade); Hudson Soft (TurboGrafx-CD); Sega (Mega Drive)
- Publishers: Sega; TurboGrafx-CD: JP: Hudson Soft; NA: NEC
- Composer: Shinichi Sakamoto
- Series: Wonder Boy
- Platforms: Arcade, TurboGrafx-CD, Mega Drive, Windows
- Release: November 1988: Arcade; JP: November 1988; NA: December 1988 TurboGrafx-CD; JP: August 31, 1989; NA: December 1989 Mega Drive; JP: December 22, 1990; EU: 1991 Windows; WW: January 26, 2011
- Genres: Platform, scrolling shooter
- Modes: Single-player, multiplayer
- Arcade system: Sega System 16

Wonder Boy III: Monster Lair (ワンダーボーイIII モンスターレア, Wandā Bōi Surī: Monsutā Reā; "Wonder Boy III Monster Lair") is a 1988 platform game developed by Westone and published by Sega for arcades. It is the third game in the Wonder Boy series and the last one released for arcades. A console adaptation was made by Hudson Soft and released in 1989 in Japan for the PC Engine CD-ROM² System; the subsequent North American release on the TurboGrafx-CD dropped the Wonder Boy III title. It was also converted and released by Sega for the Mega Drive in Japan in 1990 and Europe in 1991. Both the TurboGrafx-CD and Mega Drive versions were later re-released for the Wii Virtual Console.

== Gameplay ==
Screenshot of the Mega Drive version

The game balances basic concepts found in both platformers and arcade shooters. The player is able to jump and shoot projectiles from a sword. He must ride a flying dragon and confront a large boss throughout the second half of each round. The player's life bar steadily diminishes as time passes. Health is gained through collection of fruit and projectile weapons. Some fruits, when shot, will expand and burst into multiple items.

=== Combat ===
In the action scenes, the player's vitality decreases as he makes his way towards the skull, but this can be restored by collecting fruit. A wide variety of weapons can be picked up, and not only do these allow the player to use the weapons for a limited amount of time, but they also increase vitality. In the shooter scenes, the player rides a pink friend as he makes his way through the scene. Here, vitality remains static unless hit by an enemy passing by. As usual, there is a boss waiting at the end that must be defeated. Every boss changes color to show how much damage has been done to it. Some bosses must be defeated in two stages. If vitality gets low in each scene, the player loses a life. Two players can play the game simultaneously. If available lives are exhausted during the final boss encounter, even if you still have credits remaining (or insert additional coins in the arcade version), the game will end - you will not be permitted to continue.

== Plot and setting ==
The player controls a green-haired boy hero named Leo (player 1; renamed "Adam" for the American TurboGrafx-CD release) or a pink-haired girl hero named Princess Anju Purapril (Priscilla in the English language Mega Drive version, player 2; renamed "Laura" for the American TurboGrafx-CD release) who must attack the invaders that attempt to collect weapons and use them to destroy the land. The gameplay consists of action and shooter scenes. The game starts out as a simple platform game, and later on the game is transformed into a shoot 'em up.

== Development ==
The game's music was composed by Shinichi Sakamoto, who is also responsible for the music of the game Wonder Boy in Monster Land.

== Reception ==
Reception

Review score
Publication	Score
Famitsu	8/10, 8/10, 9/10, 8/10 (PCE)

In Japan, Game Machine listed Wonder Boy III: Monster Lair as the seventh most successful table arcade unit of December 1988.

Reviewers in Famicom Tsūshin complimented the PC Engine version of the game for its graphics, play control and well-balanced difficulty. While one reviewer commented that while it was a great game, it did not offer much new ideas for the genre.
