= Wonder Boy =

Wonder Boy/Monster World
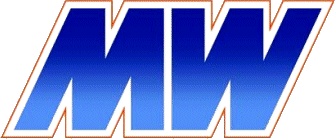
- Monster World logo
- Genres: Platform, action role-playing, Metroidvania
- Developers: Westone Bit Entertainment; Sega; Lizardcube; CFK; Game Atelier; Artdink
- Publishers: Sega; Activision; Hudson Soft; DotEmu; CFK; FDG Entertainment; G-Choice; ININ Games
- Creator: Ryuichi Nishizawa
- Platforms: Arcade, SG-1000, Master System, Sega Genesis, Game Gear, Commodore 64, Amstrad CPC, ZX Spectrum, MSX, Amiga, Apple IIGS, Atari ST, PC Engine/TurboGrafx-16, PlayStation 2, PlayStation 3, PlayStation 4, PlayStation 5, Xbox 360, Xbox One, Xbox Series X/S, NES, Wii, Nintendo Switch, Windows
- First release: Wonder Boy; 21 April 1986
- Latest release: Wonder Boy: Asha in Monster World; May 2021

The Wonder Boy (ワンダーボーイ, Wandā Bōi) series, also known as the Monster World (モンスターワールド, Monsutā Wārudo) series, is a franchise of video games published by Sega and developed by Westone Bit Entertainment (formerly Escape). Beginning with the original Wonder Boy arcade game released in April 21, 1986, the game has spawned several sequels released for arcade, Master System, and Sega Genesis, as well as three compilation titles and three remakes by other developers. Several titles have been ported to other consoles by different publishers under different names, most notably Hudson Soft's Adventure Island adaptation of the original game. The main character "Wonder Boy" was named Book by the developer and Tom-Tom by Sega for overseas editions.

== Overview ==
The first Wonder Boy game is a side-scrolling platformer in which the player must reach the end of the level, avoiding enemies and collecting fruit to restore a gradually reducing health vitality. Originally Wonder Boy was going to have non-stop moving as a pressure element, but the designer, Ryuichi Nishizawa, could not play the game like that and had that element removed. Aside from Wonder Boy III: Monster Lair, which features similar gameplay to the first Wonder Boy while also incorporating shoot 'em up portions, the other games in the series, referred to in Japan as the Monster World sub-series, focus on a fantasy setting with role-playing elements. Defeating enemies in these games earns money that can be used to purchase new weapons, armor, and items to make the player stronger. Many of these games have a Metroidvania approach to gameplay, in which obtaining new items or abilities can grant access to new areas in the game.

== List of games ==
=== Main series ===
Box art for Sega Vintage Collection: Monster World

#	Title	Release	Original system	Ports	Other names / Notes
1	Wonder Boy	1986	Arcade	Commodore 64, Amstrad CPC, ZX Spectrum, SG-1000, Master System, Game Gear, Wii (Virtual Console)	Super Wonder Boy (Japan, Sega Mark III); Revenge of Drancon (North America, Game Gear)
2	Wonder Boy in Monster Land	1987	Arcade	PC Engine, Master System, Family Computer, Amiga, Atari ST, Commodore 64, Amstrad CPC, ZX Spectrum, Wii (Virtual Console), Nintendo Switch	Bikkuriman World (Japan, PC Engine); Super Wonder Boy: Monster World (Japan, Sega Mark III); Saiyūki World (Japan, Family Computer); Super Wonder Boy in Monster Land (Activision microcomputer ports); Super Wonder Boy: Super Monster Land (North American variant cartridge, Master System)
3	Wonder Boy III: Monster Lair	1988	Arcade	Mega Drive, PC Engine CD, Wii (Virtual Console)	Monster Lair (North America, TurboGrafx CD)
4	Wonder Boy III: The Dragon's Trap	1989	Master System	Game Gear, TurboGrafx 16/PC Engine, Wii (Virtual Console)	Adventure Island (Japan, PC Engine); Dragon's Curse (North America, TG-16/Wii); Wonder Boy: The Dragon's Trap (Europe, Game Gear); Wonder Boy III (Master System); Monster World II: Dragon no Wana (Japan, Game Gear)
5	Wonder Boy in Monster World	1991	Sega Genesis / Mega Drive	Master System, PC Engine/TurboGrafx CD, Wii (Virtual Console), Windows	Wonder Boy V: Monster World III (Japan); The Dynastic Hero (US, TurboGrafx CD)
6	Monster World IV	1994	Sega Mega Drive	Wii (Virtual Console)	
7	Monster Boy and the Cursed Kingdom	2018	PlayStation 4, Xbox One, Nintendo Switch	Windows, Stadia, PlayStation 5, Xbox Series X/S	Developed by Game Atelier and published by FDG Entertainment.

=== Remakes ===
Title	Release	Original system	Ports	Other names / Notes
Wonder Boy Returns	2016	Windows	PlayStation 4, Nintendo Switch	Remake of Wonder Boy.; Wonder Boy Returns Remix on Nintendo Switch; Developed and published by CFK.
Wonder Boy: The Dragon's Trap	2017	PlayStation 4, Nintendo Switch, Xbox One	Windows, macOS, Linux, iOS, Android	Remake of Wonder Boy III: The Dragon's Trap.; Developed by Lizardcube and published by DotEmu.
Wonder Boy: Asha in Monster World	2021	PlayStation 4, Nintendo Switch, Windows	PlayStation 5, Xbox Series X/S	Remake of Monster World IV.; Developed by Artdink and Monkey Craft, and published by ININ Games, G-Choice and Bliss Brain.

=== Compilations ===
Title	Release	System	Games included
Sega Ages Vol.29: Monster World Complete Collection	2007 (Japan only)	PlayStation 2	Wonder Boy; Wonder Boy in Monster Land; Wonder Boy III: Monster Lair; Wonder Boy III: The Dragon's Trap; Wonder Boy in Monster World; Monster World IV
Sega Vintage Collection: Monster World	2012	PlayStation 3, Xbox 360	Wonder Boy in Monster Land; Wonder Boy in Monster World; Monster World IV
Sega Genesis Classics	2018	PlayStation 4, Xbox One, Windows	Wonder Boy III: Monster Lair; Wonder Boy in Monster World
Wonder Boy Collection	2022	PlayStation 4, Nintendo Switch	Wonder Boy; Wonder Boy in Monster Land; Wonder Boy in Monster World; Monster World IV
Wonder Boy Anniversary Collection	2022	PlayStation 4, Nintendo Switch, PlayStation 5	Wonder Boy (Arcade, Master System, Game Gear versions); Wonder Boy in Monster Land (Arcade, Master System versions); Wonder Boy III: The Dragon's Trap (Master System, Game Gear versions); Wonder Boy III: Monster Lair (Arcade, Genesis versions); Wonder Boy in Monster World (Genesis, Master System versions); Monster World IV

== Modified ports ==
Westone, the developer of the series, owned the copyrights to each game in the series, while Sega retained the "Wonder Boy" and "Monster World" trademarks. This created a situation which allowed other game companies to publish ports of the games to non-Sega platforms under license from Westone, provided that they changed the titles to remove all references to "Wonder Boy" or "Monster World".

With the exception of Monster World IV, each game in the Wonder Boy series has been ported to other systems by Hudson Soft. The original game was ported to the Nintendo Entertainment System under the name Adventure Island, which eventually spawned its own franchise. Wonder Boy in Monster Land, Wonder Boy III: The Dragon's Trap, and Wonder Boy in Monster World, were all released on the TurboGrafx-16/PC Engine under the names Bikkuriman World, Dragon's Curse, and The Dynastic Hero respectively. Wonder Boy III: Monster Lair was ported to the TurboGrafx-CD with original main and boss characters, although the North American version removed the "Wonder Boy III" part in the title while the Japanese version kept it. Another port of Wonder Boy in Monster Land, titled Saiyūki World, was developed by NMK and published by Jaleco for the Nintendo Famicom in Japan, also spawning an independently created sequel, Saiyūki World 2, which was released in North America as Whomp 'Em.

In Brazil, where the Master System received much popularity, Tec Toy released adapted versions of Wonder Boy in Monster Land, Wonder Boy III: The Dragon's Trap, and Wonder Boy in Monster World under the names Mônica: No Castelo do Dragão (Monica: The Dragon's Castle), Turma da Mônica em O Resgate (Monica's Gang to the Rescue), and Turma da Mônica na Terra dos Monstros (Monica's Gang in the Land of Monsters). These games replaced the main characters with characters from Mauricio de Sousa's Monica's Gang comic book series. The latter, Turma da Mônica na Terra dos Monstros, received a re-release with SD card update compatibility in August 2017.

=== Adventure Island series ===
Adventure Island was Hudson Soft's adaptation of the original Wonder Boy game for the Nintendo Entertainment System and MSX2, originally released in 1986. Due to the popularity of the game's success on the system, Hudson Soft created a series of sequels with no involvement from Westone, retaining the same gameplay style as the original game.

== Other media ==
=== Soundtrack ===
Monster World Complete Collection Original Sound Track

Soundtrack album by Shinichi Sakamoto, Jin Watanabe
- Released: March 8, 2007
- Genre: Video game soundtrack

A soundtrack album, the Monster World Complete Collection Original Sound Track was released in 2007. Composed by Shinichi Sakamoto and Jin Watanabe the 2-CD album was published by Wave Master (the audio division of Sega).

=== Comic books ===
Wonder Boy was adapted into two stories that ran in Fleetway's Sonic the Comic, both written by Mark Eyles with art by Bojan Djukac, which were loosely based on Wonder Boy in Monster World. "Wonder Boy in Demon World" ran between issues 2-9 and saw Shion, the protagonist who has a dislike of being referred to as Wonder Boy, fighting to save some people while staving off a demon curse. "Wonder Boy in Ghost Land" ran between issues 22-27, and saw Shion travel to a world of ghostly dinosaurs.
