= Wonder Boy III: The Dragon's Trap =

1989 video game

- North American Master System box art
- Developer: Westone
- Publisher: Sega
- Composer: Shinichi Sakamoto
- Series: Wonder Boy
- Platforms: Master System, Game Gear, PC Engine/TurboGrafx-16, mobile phone, iOS
- Release: September 1989: Master System; NA: September 1989; EU: 1989 PC Engine/TurboGrafx-16; JP: April 19, 1991; NA: December 31, 1990 Game Gear; JP: March 27, 1992; EU: 1992 Mobile; JP: January 15, 2009 iOS; JP: May 31, 2011
- Genres: Platform, action-adventure
- Mode: Single player

Wonder Boy III: The Dragon's Trap is a platforming action-adventure video game developed by Westone as part of Sega's Wonder Boy series. It was published by Sega in 1989 for the Master System in the US and Europe. It did not reach Japan until its Game Gear port in 1992, localized as Monster World II: The Dragon's Trap (Note: Japanese: モンスターワールドＩＩ ドラゴンの罠, Hepburn: Monsutā Wārudo Tsū: Doragon no Wana). It was ported by Hudson Soft and released in 1991 for the TurboGrafx-16/PC Engine under the name Dragon's Curse. (Note: Released in Japan as Adventure Island (アドベンチャーアイランド, Adobenchā Airando).) It was also ported in 1993 by Brazilian company Tec Toy under the title Turma da Mônica em o Resgate, with the game retooled to include characters from Brazilian comic book series Monica's Gang (Turma da Mônica). A remake developed by Lizardcube and published by DotEmu, titled Wonder Boy: The Dragon's Trap, was released in April 2017.

The game takes place after the events of Wonder Boy in Monster Land, in which Wonder Boy has been cursed by the Mecha Dragon and must locate the Salamander Cross to lift it. The game is nonlinear and features varying landscapes in which players must navigate. Players find items and clues needed to access different parts of Monster Land, and they can transform into other forms and gain different abilities.

Wonder Boy III: The Dragon's Trap received wide acclaim from gaming magazines upon its release. It was praised for its colorful and cartoon-like graphics, rich sound and diverse sound effects, and varied and addictive gameplay. Criticisms include sprite flickering in the Master System version as well as slippery controls. It won Electronic Gaming Monthly's "Best Game of the Year" award for the Master System in 1989. Reviews from gaming magazines have described the game as one of the best Master System and 8-bit titles of that era.

== Overview ==
Wonder Boy III: The Dragon's Trap takes place immediately after the events of Wonder Boy in Monster Land, Wonder Boy travels into the Mecha Dragon's lair in order to slay him. (Some sources refer to this creature as the "MEKA dragon".) However, upon doing so, he is inflicted by a curse that transforms him into "Lizard-Man". In the game, the player controls Wonder Boy as he tries to undo this curse by journeying across the land, defeating other dragons, and finally defeating the Vampire Dragon to obtain the Salamander Cross – the only object that can remove his curse.

After completing the first level in the game (a simplified version of the final level from the preceding game Wonder Boy in Monster Land), the player begins as Lizard-Man from Alsedo, a town in Monster Land, and the gameplay becomes nonlinear. From there, the player explores and finds items and clues needed for Wonder Boy to access different parts of Monster Land. Gold and additional secondary items can be found by defeating enemies and opening treasure chests. With gold, players can buy additional items and better equipment in shops and restore their life meter in hospitals. Items with question marks displayed cannot be bought unless the player has "charm", which can be increased by collecting Charm Stones or by equipping certain items.

Lizard-Man attacks an enemy frog by breathing fire at it in the Desert stage. Above, there are two Fire Shooters.

In the game, the player uses the directional pad to move Wonder Boy left or right, crouch down (only possible as Hu-Man or Lizard-Man), or to enter doors. The buttons on the controller are used to attack enemies and to jump. Wonder Boy can attack with his main weapon or with secondary weapons by holding down on the directional pad and pressing the attack button. Pressing the pause button brings up the Status Screen (and pauses the game if Wonder Boy is fighting a dragon). Wonder Boy has a life meter shown on the top of the gameplay area as a series of hearts. When all hearts turn black, Wonder Boy dies and the game ends, but if he has a life potion ("medicine vial" in Dragon's Curse) remaining, he will revive with some of the hearts refilled. After the game ends, the player is taken to a "continue screen"; there the player has an opportunity to win a free life potion before restarting the game at the town. Players can visit the town's church to receive a password in order to continue the game at a later time. The password saves the player's current form, equipment, and amount of gold; but it does not save any secondary weapons or life potions in stock. Dragon's Curse has a "file cabinet" which allows players to store passwords into the game's memory.

Throughout the game, players go through differently-themed levels: underwater, desert, jungle, cave, and sky. At the end of each level is a different dragon. After defeating a dragon, Wonder Boy changes form, and his abilities change. Wonder Boy begins the game as Hu-Man, equipped with all eight hearts and the strongest equipment. He turns into Lizard-Man after defeating and being cursed by the Mecha Dragon in the first level. At that point, he loses all equipment and all hearts except one. Lizard-Man attacks enemies by breathing fire at them and he can duck, but must use his fire breath to defend against enemy projectiles as he does not hold a shield in front of him. He can assume other different forms throughout the game: Mouse-Man can walk on walls and ceilings designated by checkered "mouse blocks", Piranha-Man can swim freely underwater and can access underwater places (such as the ship) which the other forms cannot, Lion-Man attacks enemies with his sword by slashing from directly above to directly below him allowing him to attack targets other forms cannot hit because all of them except for Lizard-Man simply thrust their sword, and Hawk-Man can fly freely in the air but takes damage if he enters water.

== Development and release ==
Wonder Boy III: The Dragon's Trap was developed by Westone and was published by Sega; it is the sequel to Wonder Boy in Monster Land. It was first released for the Master System in September for North America. The game was then released to the PC Engine in Japan April 19, 1991 under the title Adventure Island (not to be confused with the Adventure Island series of games for the Nintendo Entertainment System); it was released for the TurboGrafx-16 that same year by NEC under the title Dragon's Curse. Westone allowed Hudson Soft to publish the game provided they made no reference to the Wonder Boy series. Sega then released the game for the Game Gear in 1992 in Europe under the game's original title (excluding the roman numeral "III") and in Japan under the title Monster World II: Dragon no Wana. In 1993, Tec Toy released the game in Brazil for the Master System under the title Turma da Mônica em o Resgate. Tec Toy replaced the sprites with characters from Brazilian comic book series Monica's Gang (Turma da Mônica), so instead of the player character turning into different creatures, he gets turned into different characters from the comics, relaying between them in order to rescue Monica, who disappeared after the previous game. In 2007, Sega released the game in Japan for the PlayStation 2 as part of a compilation of all the Wonder Boy games titled Sega Ages 2500 Vol. 29: Monster World Complete Collection. During the same year, Dragon's Curse/Adventure Island was released for the Wii's Virtual Console service worldwide. The Master System version of Wonder Boy III: The Dragon's Trap was released in Europe on September 10, 2009 and in North America on November 9, 2009.

== Reception ==
Contemporary reviews

Review scores
Publication	Score	
Publication	Master System	TurboGrafx-16
ACE	915/1000	
Computer and Video Games	86% 96%	
GamePro	Positive	20/25
Joystick	88%	
Mean Machines Sega	95%	
Raze		80%
The Games Machine (UK)	71%	86%
Video Games (DE)	83%	
Zero	73%	
Mean Machines	95%	
Sega Power	5/5	
Sega Pro	97%	
S: The Sega Magazine	92%	

Award
Publication	Award
Electronic Gaming Monthly	Best Game of the Year (Sega Master System)

=== Contemporary ===
Wonder Boy III: The Dragon's Trap received wide acclaim from critics upon release. It received coverage in the September 1989 issue of Electronic Gaming Monthly, where they provided a brief overview of the game and a summary of the events in Wonder Boy in Monster Land leading up to the game's plot. GamePro published a review of the game in its September–October 1989 issue, stating that "it's truly an adventure worthy of Wonder Boy". It received extensive coverage in both the January and February 1990 issues of VideoGames & Computer Entertainment, featuring an overview and a walkthrough of the game. The magazine praised the game for its challenge and overall look, which it says "will have you manipulating your control pad for days on end".

Various UK-based video gaming magazines gave Wonder Boy III: The Dragon's Trap significant coverage. UK magazines Computer and Video Games and its spin-off Mean Machines – in the latter's premiere issue – gave the game positive reviews. Computer and Video Games praised the animation in particular and called it the best game of its type on that platform, using phrases such as "familiar air of polish and ingenuity" and "piles of addiction guaranteed". Mean Machines' Matt Regan said it "ranks as one of the greatest Sega Master System games ever!"; he compared the gameplay to the Mario series of video games and praised the game's depth, saying that "there's always something new to discover, be it a key to a previously locked door or even a secret room!" Julian Rignall praised the game's graphics and the huge world players can explore, which he says contributes to the game's addictiveness. He said that "the combination of adventuring, shooting and platform action results in one of the best games of its type available on any console". Collectively, they praised the game overall presentation and graphics, saying that the sprites complement the background. While they additionally praised its playability for being "accessible from the word go" and longevity, they criticized its sound, saying that it "could have been much better".

The Games Machine complimented the game's colorful backgrounds and sprites with "the [Wonder] Boy himself being particularly well-drawn", while they criticized the Master System version's weak animation on some of the characters as well as its choppy scrolling. They called it one of the best Master System games but complained that it was expensive, saying "do you really want to spend 28 quid on it?" The magazine's review of the PC Engine version in the same issue was more positive. The magazine's successor, Raze, reviewed the PC Engine version titled Adventure Island. The magazine praised the game's simplistic and addictive platforming gameplay and its smooth-scrolling graphics, though they said they were "a little blocky". They noted that the game had excellent music which was "worth listening through some headphones". Zero, along with praising the game's graphics and music, called it "enormously addictive"; the review said the ability to transform into different forms and hence being able to progress into new areas kept the game fresh. ACE magazine in 1989 listed it as one of the top three best Master System games available at the time, along with Ys: The Vanished Omens and California Games.

German magazine Video Games gave Wonder Boy III: The Dragon's Trap a positive review, saying that the game gave more weight to strategy and tactics, that it "stands out clearly from the two predecessors", and that its graphics became less childlike but more "spectacular". The review continued, saying that its gameplay is a good example of what makes action-adventure games addictive to play. It complimented the game's depth and wide array of equipment, saying that it "provides an additional touch, which makes [it] the best thought-out game [at the time]".

=== Awards ===
In the December 1989 issue of Electronic Gaming Monthly, in its "Best and Worst of 1989" feature, the game won an award for "Best Game of the Year" for the Sega Master System.

German magazine Power Play ranked the Master System version third among the system's games of 1989, and later ranked the Game Gear version third among handheld games of 1992.

=== Retrospective ===
Retrospective reviews

Aggregate score
Aggregator	Score	
Aggregator	Master System	Wii
GameRankings		73% (4 reviews)

Review scores
Publication	Score	
Publication	Master System	Wii
AllGame	4.5/5	4.5/5
IGN		7.5/10
Nintendo Life		8/10

Upon the release of the TurboGrafx-16 version Dragon's Curse to the Virtual Console in 2007, IGN's Lucas Thomas reviewed the game, comparing the opening sequence of the game to the opening sequence of the laterCastlevania: Symphony of the Night; he proceeded to add that the game has similarities with games in the Castlevania series, calling the game "a straightforward and simple 'Metroidvania' adventure" but with "several layers of unexpected depth". Thomas noted the game's popularity among fans and that it plays almost exactly the same as the Master System version despite graphics and sound improvements; at the time, there were no Master System games on the Virtual Console. He praised the game's rich sound, gameplay depth, and "colorful and cartoony" graphics, which "was perfectly suited to the TurboGrafx platform".

IGN's Travis Fahs, in discussing the SMS version, offered another opinion, praising the game as "not only the crowning achievement of the series, but perhaps one of the best games of the 8-bit era", drawing comparisons to both Mario and Zelda. Thomas again reviewed the Master System version of Wonder Boy III: The Dragon's Trap when it was released two years later for the Virtual Console. In this review, he compares the gameplay to Metroid – more specifically the need to gather additional equipment and abilities to advance in the game. While he acknowledged that this version from one of the best Master System games as well as for any 8-bit system, he felt that the Master System's Virtual Console release had a reduced appeal. He said that the TurboGrafx-16 version Dragon's Curse had already been out for two years and that there was no difference in gameplay between the two versions, but there were improvements in graphics and sound in the TurboGrafx-16 version because of the system's superior capabilities. He also noted that the Master System version suffers from sprite flickering – something the TurboGrafx-16 version did not have. Despite the small differences in the two versions, he decided to give the Master System version the same rating as the TurboGrafx-16 version.

Allgame's review of the Master System version praised the non-linear gameplay and the ability to change into different forms, saying that it "keeps things interesting and fun" and "keeps the game from getting repetitive". It lauded its visuals and sound effects, saying the "graphics are very colorful and have a cartoon look to them". Criticisms included slippery controls and the difficulty of getting into doors; it said the controls kept the game from obtaining a perfect rating, and the gameplay was still not as good as Wonder Boy in Monster Land. The editing staff from magazine Retro Gamer listed Wonder Boy III: The Dragon's Trap as one of the "Perfect Ten Games" for the Master System, calling it "the best in a long and highly convoluted myriad of multi-titled games" and "a great adventure that every Master System fan needs to own". The review praised the game's brisk pace and gameplay, despite the length of the game.

== Remake ==
In June 2016, indie developer Lizardcube and publisher DotEmu announced a remake of Wonder Boy III: The Dragon's Trap, simply titled Wonder Boy: The Dragon's Trap, which was released for PlayStation 4, Nintendo Switch, and Xbox One in April 2017, with a release on PC to follow in June 2017. The game supports a different, modern visual style, but retains the same gameplay, level design and story. The game was developed in collaboration with series creator Ryuichi Nishizawa.

A spiritual successor to The Dragon's Trap, titled Monster Boy and the Cursed Kingdom, is also developed by Game Atelier and published by FDG Entertainment for PlayStation 4, Xbox One, Nintendo Switch, Google Stadia, and PC. The game is also developed in collaboration with Nishizawa, but it does not use the Wonder Boy name due to Sega's ownership of the rights.
