= List of video games based on anime or manga =

Video games based on anime and manga also known as anime-based games, this is a list of computer and video games that are based on manga or anime properties. The list does not include games based on western cartoons, which are separately listed at List of video games based on cartoons.

== # ==
- 3×3 Eyes
  - 3×3 Eyes Seima kōrin-den (Super Famicom, 1992)
  - Seima Densetsu 3×3 Eyes MCD (Mega-CD, 1993)
  - 3×3 Eyes Jūma hōkan (Super Famicom, 1995)
  - 3×3 Eyes Kyūsei kōshu (Windows, PlayStation, Sega Saturn, 1995)
  - 3×3 Eyes Sanjiyan Henjyo (PC-9801, FM Towns, PC Engine, Windows, 1996)
  - 3×3 Eyes Tenrin' ō Genmu (Windows, PlayStation, 1997)

== A ==
- Aah! Harimanada (Game Boy, Game Gear, Mega Drive, 1993)
- Accel World: Ginyoku no Kakusei (PlayStation 3, PlayStation Portable, 2012)
  - Accel World: Kasoku no Chōten (PlayStation 3, PlayStation Portable, 2013)
  - Accel World vs. Sword Art Online (Playstation 4, Playstation Vita, Microsoft Windows, 2017)
- Afro Samurai (PlayStation 3, Xbox 360, 2009)
- Ace wo Nerae! (Super Famicom, Telenet Japan, December 24, 1993, ¥9400, Tennis)
- Ah! My Goddess! (PC-FX, NEC, December 29, 1993, ¥8000, Adventure)
  - Quiz Ah! My Goddess!: Tatakau Tsubasa to Tomo ni (Arcade, Sega/Wow Entertainment Inc./Kodansha, May 2000, Adventure/Quiz)
  - Quiz Ah! My Goddess!: Tatakau Tsbasa to Tomo ni (Dreamcast, Sega/Wow Entertainment Inc./Kodansha, November 20, 2000, ¥5800/¥8800, Adventure)
  - Aa Megami-sama! Best Collection (PlayStation 2)
- Akazukin Chacha (Game Boy, Tomy, 1995)
  - Akazukin ChaCha (Super Famicom, Tomy, 1996, Role-playing)
  - Akazukin ChaCha: Osawagase! Panic Race! (PC-FX, NEC, October 25, 1996, ¥7800, Board)
- Akira (Famicom, 1988, ¥6800, Role-playing)
  - Akira (CD-32, AMI, 1994)
  - Akira Psycho Ball (PlayStation 2, 2006)
- Akuma-kun: Makai no Wana (Family Computer)
- Angelic Layer (Game Boy Advance)
- Anpanman (Famicom, PlayStation, Sega Pico, Advanced Pico Beena)
  - Soreike! Anpanman Minna de Hiking Game! (Famicom)
  - Anpanman Niko Niko Party (Wii)
  - Soreike! Anpanman Fushigi na Nikoniko Album (Game Boy Color)
  - Soreike! Anpanman 5tsu no Tou no Ousama (Game Boy Color)
  - Soreike! Anpanman Picnic de Obenkyou (Playdia)
  - Soreike! Anpanman Yuuki Rinrin Anpanchi! (Cocopad)
  - Anpanman to Asobo: ABC Kyoushitsu (Nintendo DS)
  - Anpanman to Asobo: Aiueo Kyoushitsu (Nintendo DS)
  - Anpanman to Asobu: Aiueo Kyoushitsu DX (Nintendo DS)
  - Anpanman to Touch de Waku Waku Training (Nintendo DS, Nintendo 3DS)
  - Anpanman to Asobo: New Aiueo Kyoushitsu (Nintendo 3DS)
  - KidsStation Soreike! Anpanman (PlayStation)
  - KidsStation Anpanman to Daibouken (also available with KidsStation controller set) (PlayStation)
  - KidsStation Sugoroku Anpanman (also available with KidsStation controller set) (PlayStation)
  - KidsStation Oshaberi Oekaki Soreike! Anpanman (also available with pen tablet controller set) (PlayStation)
  - Soreike! Anpanman Baikinman no Daisakusen (Nintendo DS)
- Ao no Exorcist: Genkoku no Labyrinth (PlayStation Portable, 2012, Visual novel)
  - Ao no Exorcist: Weekend Hero (PlayStation Portable)
- Aoi Blink (PC Engine)
- Appleseed: Prometheus no Shintaku (Super Famicom, 1994)
  - Appleseed EX (PlayStation 2, 2007)
- Araiguma Rascal: Raccoon Rascal (Super Famicom)
- Area 88 (Arcade, Capcom, August 1989, Shooting, titled U.N. Squadron in North America)
  - Area 88 (Super Famicom, Capcom, July 26, 1991, ¥8500, Shooting, titled U.N. Squadron in North America)
- Armored Police Metal Jack (Game Boy, Super Famicom)
- Armored Trooper Votoms (Various consoles)
  - Armored Trooper Votoms Gaiden: Blue Knight Berserga Story (PlayStation, Takara, October 30, 1997, ¥9800/¥5800, 3D fighting)
  - Armored Troopers Votoms: Woodo.Kummen (PlayStation, Takara, April 2, 1998, ¥9800/¥5800, 3D action)
  - Armored Trooper Votoms: Lightning Slash (PlayStation, Takara, March 18, 1999, ¥9800/¥5800, 3D action)
  - Armored Troopers Votoms: Steel Force (PlayStation, Takara, September 30, 1999, ¥6800, Strategy)
- Ashita no Joe
  - Legend of Success Joe (NeoGeo, 1991, Boxing)
  - Ashita no Joe (Super Famicom, Kei Amuzement, November 27, 1992, ¥8900, Boxing)
- Ashita no Nadja (Sega Pico)
- Astro Boy
  - Astro Boy: Omega Factor (Game Boy Advance, Sega, December 18, 2003)
  - Astro Boy (PlayStation 2, Sega, April 18, 2004)
- Attack on Titan: Humanity in Chains (Nintendo 3DS, 2013)
  - Attack on Titan (PC, PlayStation 3, PlayStation 4, PlayStation Vita, Xbox One, 2016)
  - Attack on Titan 2 (PC, PlayStation 4, Xbox One, Nintendo Switch, 2018)
- Aura Battler Dunbine (MSX, PlayStation)
- Azumanga Donjara Daioh (PlayStation, April 18, 2002)
  - Azumanga Daioh Puzzle Bobble (Arcade, June 1, 2002)
  - Azumanga Daioh Advance (Game Boy Advance, April 25, 2003)

== B ==
- Bakemonogatari Portable (PlayStation Portable, 2012, Visual Novel)
- Bakugan Battle Brawlers (video game) (PlayStation 2, Xbox 360, Wii, Nintendo DS, PlayStation Portable)
- Bakuretsu Hunter (Sega Saturn, I'Max, April 26, 1996, ¥8800, Adventure)
  - Bakuretsu Hunter Mahjongg Special (PlayStation, Banpresto, October 25, 1996, ¥5800, Mahjongg)
  - Bakuretsu Hunter: Sorezore no Omoi...Nowānchatte (PlayStation, Banpresto, April 11, 1997, ¥5800, Adventure)
  - Bakuretsu Hunter R (Sega Saturn, King Records, August 8, 1997, ¥5800, Adventure)
- Bastard! Ankoku no Hakaishin (Super Famicom, Cobra Team, 1994, 3D Fighting/Action)
  - Bastard! (PlayStation, Seta/Shueisha, December 27, 1996, ¥6800, Role-playing)
- Battle B-Daman (Game Boy, Game Boy Advance, Nintendo 64, Super Famicom)
- Battle Mages Free (Android Mobile)
- Beck: The Game (PS2)
- Berserk: Sword of the Berserk: Guts' Rage (Dreamcast, Yuke's/ASCII, December 1999, 3D Action/Adventure)
  - Berserk: Millennium Falcon Hen Seima Senki no Shō (PlayStation 2, Sega-Sammy, October 2004, 3D Action/Adventure)
  - Berserk and the Band of the Hawk (PlayStation 3, PlayStation 4, October 2016, Musou)
- Beyblade
- Bikkuriman World (PC Engine, Hudson, October 30, 1987, ¥4500, Action)
  - Bikkuriman Daijikai (PC Engine, Hudson, December 23, 1988, ¥4980, Quiz)
  - Bikkuriman World Gekitō Seisenshi (Famicom, Hudson, July 27, 1990, ¥6800, Role-playing)
  - Super Bikkuriman (Super Famicom, Interbec, January 29, 1993, ¥8190, Fighting/Action)
  - Bikkuriman 2000 Viva! Festiva! (Dreamcast, Sega Toys, May 2, 2000, ¥4800, Minigames)
  - Bikkuriman 2000 Viva! Pocket Festiva! (Neo Geo Pocket Color, Sega Toys, March 16, 2000, ¥3800, Minigame)
  - Bikkuriman 2000 Viva! Festiva! (Game Boy Color, Imagineer, June 10, 2000, ¥3980, Card)
  - Bikkuriman 2000 Viva! Festiva! (Dreamcast, Sega Toys, May 2, 2000, ¥4800, Boardgame)
- Bishoujo Senshi Sailor Moon (PC Engine, Super Famicom, Mega Drive, Game Boy, Sega Pico)
- Black Cat (PlayStation 2)
- Black Clover: Dream Knights (Android)
- Black Clover: Quartet Knights (PlayStation 4, PC, 2018)
- Black Rock Shooter: The Game (PlayStation Portable)
- Bleach: Blade Battlers (PlayStation 2, 2006)
  - Bleach: Blade Battlers 2nd (PlayStation 2, 2007)
  - Bleach: The Blade of Fate (Nintendo DS October 9, 2007; Europe February, 2008)
  - Bleach: The 3rd Phantom (Nintendo DS, 2008)
  - Bleach GC (GameCube)
  - Bleach: Heat the Soul (PlayStation Portable)
  - Bleach: Heat the Soul 2 (PlayStation Portable)
  - Bleach: Heat the Soul 3 (PlayStation Portable)
  - Bleach: Heat the Soul 4 (PlayStation Portable)
  - Bleach: Heat the Soul 5 (PlayStation Portable)
  - Bleach: Heat the Soul 6 (PlayStation Portable)
  - Bleach: Heat the Soul 7 (PlayStation Portable)
  - Bleach: Shattered Blade (Wii, Release Date(s): JPN December 14, 2006; North America)
  - Bleach: Soul Carnival (PlayStation Portable)
  - Bleach: Soul Carnival 2 (PlayStation Portable)
  - Bleach: Soul Resurrección (PS3)
- Blood+: The final piece (PlayStation Portable, 2006, Adventure RPG)
- Blood The Last Vampire (PlayStation 2, 2006)
- Blood+: One Night Kiss (PlayStation 2, 2006, Action Shooter)
- Blood+: Sōyoku no Battle Rondo (PlayStation 2, 2006, Adventure Game)
- Blue Seed: Kushinada-hime Hirokuden (Saturn, Sega, June 23, 1995, ¥5800, Role-playing)
- Boboboubo Boubobo (PlayStation 2)
  - Boboboubo Boubobo: 9 Kiwame Senshi Gyagu Yuugou (Game Boy Advance)
  - Boboboubo Boubobo: Bakutou Hajike Taisen (Game Boy Advance)
  - Boboboubo Boubobo Dassutsu! Hajike Royale (Gamecube)
  - Boboboubo Boubobo: Majide!!? Shinken Shoubu (Game Boy Advance)
  - Boboboubo Boubobo: Ougi 87.5 Bakuretsu Hanage Shinken (Game Boy Advance)
  - Boboboubo Boubobo: Shuumare! Taikan Boubobo: (PlayStation 2)
- Bouken ou Beet: Darkness Century (PlayStation 2)
- Boys Be... (PlayStation, PlayStation 2)
- Brave Fencer Musashi (PlayStation)
- Brave Story: New Traveler (PlayStation Portable, 2006, RPG)
- Bravoman (Arcade, Namco, 1988)
  - Chōzetsu Rinjin Bravoman (PC Engine, Namco, ¥6800, 1990)
- B's LOG Party (PSP)
- Bubblegum Crash! (PC Engine, Naxat, December 6, 1991, ¥7200, Adventure)
- Busou Renkin: Welcome To Papillion Park (PlayStation 2)

== C ==
- Captain Tsubasa (Famicom, Super Famicom, Game Boy, Game Boy Advance, Sega-CD, PlayStation, PlayStation 2, Gamecube, PlayStation Portable)
- Cardcaptor Sakura (Dreamcast, Game Boy Advance, Wonderswan)
  - Animetic Story Game Cardcaptor Sakura, August 5, 1999, PlayStation
  - Cardcaptor Sakura Clow Card Magic, January 27, 2000, PlayStation
  - TETRIS with Cardcaptor Sakura, August 10, 2000, PlayStation
  - Cardcaptor Sakura Itsumo Sakurachan to Issho, May 15, 1999, Game Boy with Game Boy Color support
  - Cardcaptor Sakura Tomoeda Shogakko Daiundokai, August 6, 2000, Game Boy Color
  - Cardcaptor Sakura Sakura-chan to Asobo, December 2, 2004, PlayStation 2
- Chibi Maruko-chan (Famicom, Sega Pico, Super Famicom, Game Boy, Game Boy Color, Mega Drive, Neo Geo, Sega Saturn, PlayStation, Nintendo DS)
- Chobits (Game Boy Advance. PlayStation 2)
- Ciao Dream Touch (Nintendo DS)
  - Ciao Manga School (Nintendo DS)
  - Ciao Illust Club (Nintendo 3DS)
- Cobra (see List of Cobra video games)
- Code Geass Hangyaku no Lelouch (Nintendo DS)
  - Code Geass - Hangyaku no Lelouch R2 - Banjou no Geass Gekijou (Nintendo DS)
  - Code Geass: Lost Colors (PlayStation Portable, PlayStation 2)
- Combat Mecha Xabungle THE Race in Action (Simple Characters Series Vol. 17) (PlayStation)
- Cowboy Bebop (PlayStation)
  - Cowboy Bebop (PlayStation 2)
- Crayon Shin-chan (Famicom, Sega Pico, Super Famicom, Game Boy Advance, Nintendo DS, Wii)
- Crusher Joe (PC-9801)
- Cutie Honey Flash (Sega Pico)
- Cyborg 009 (Sega-CD, Super Famicom)
  - Cyborg 009 THE Block Kuzushi (Simple Characters Series Vol. 15) (PlayStation)
- Cyborg Kuro-chan (Game Boy Color)

== D ==
- D.Gray-man: Kami no Shitotachi (Nintendo DS)
  - D.Gray-man Sōsha no Shikaku (PlayStation 2)
- D.N. Angel: Crimson Wings (PlayStation 2)
- Dengeki Bunko Fighting Climax (PlayStation 3, PlayStation Vita)
  - Dengeki Bunko Fighting Climax Ignition (PlayStation 3, PlayStation 4, PlayStation Vita)
- Death Note Kira Game (Nintendo DS)
  - Death Note L o Tsugumono (Nintendo DS)
  - L the Prologue to Death Note -Rasen no Wana- (Nintendo DS)
- Detective Conan (game list)
- Detective Pikachu
- Demon Beast Invasion (PC98)
- Demon Slayer: Kimetsu no Yaiba – The Hinokami Chronicles (Microsoft Windows, PlayStation 4, PlayStation 5, Xbox One, Xbox Series X/S)
- Detonator Orgun (Mega-CD)
- Devastator (Mega-CD)
- Devil Hunter Yoko (Mega Drive)
- Devilman (PlayStation)
- Di Gi Charat Fantasy (Dreamcast visual novel game based on Di Gi Charat)
- Dinosaur King (Nintendo DS)
- Dirty Pair (Famicom Disk System)
- Dokonjō Gaeru THE Mahjong (Simple Characters 2000 Series Vol. 06) (PlayStation)
- Doraemon (PC Engine, Famicom, Sega Pico, Super Famicom, Mega Drive, Game Boy Color)
- Dragon Ball (see List of Dragon Ball video games)
- Dragonia
- Duel Masters (see the list of video games)
- Durarara!! 3 Way Stand Off (PlayStation Portable game based on Durarara!!)
- Doki Doki! Pretty Cure Narikiri Life! (Nintendo 3DS)

== E ==
- Eight Man (Neo Geo)
- Eko Eko Azarak: Wizard of Darkness (PlayStation)
- El Hazard: Shinpi no Sekai (Sega Saturn)
- Erementar Gerad (PlayStation 2)
- Eureka Seven vol. 1: The New Wave (PlayStation 2)
  - Eureka Seven vol. 2: The New Vision (PlayStation 2)
- Eyeshield 21: MAX Devil Power (Nintendo DS)

== F ==
- Fairy Tail: Portable Guild (PlayStation Portable)
  - Fairy Tail: Portable Guild 2 (PlayStation Portable)
  - Fairy Tail: Zeref Awakens (PlayStation Portable)
  - Fairy Tail: Fight! Wizard Battle (Nintendo DS)
  - Fairy Tail: Attack! Kardia Cathedral (Nintendo DS)
- Fist of the North Star (see List of Fist of the North Star video games)
- Fullmetal Alchemist and the Broken Angel (PlayStation 2)
  - Fullmetal Alchemist 2: Curse of the Crimson Elixir (PlayStation 2)
  - Fullmetal Alchemist 3: Kami o Tsugu Shōjo (PlayStation 2)
  - Fullmetal Alchemist: Dual Sympathy (Nintendo DS)
  - Fullmetal Alchemist: Senaka wo Takuseshi Mono (PlayStation Portable)
  - Fullmetal Alchemist: Daughter of the Dusk (Wii)
  - Fullmetal Alchemist: Yakusoku no Hi e (PlayStation Portable)
- Fushigi no Umi no Nadia (Family Computer, Mega Drive, PC Engine, FM Towns, PC-98, X68000, PlayStation 2)
- Futari wa Precure (Game Boy Advance)
- Future GPX Cyber Formula (Game Boy, Super Famicom, PlayStation, PC, PlayStation 2, GameCube, PlayStation Portable)
- Fushigi Yugi (Nintendo DS, PlayStation 2, PlayStation Portable)
- Futari wa Pretty Cure: Arienai! Yume no Sono wa Daimeikyu (Game Boy Advance)
  - Futari wa Pretty Cure (Sega Pico)
  - Futari wa Pretty Cure Max Heart - DANZEN! DS de Pretty Cure Chikara wo Awasete Dai Battle!! (Nintendo DS)
  - Futari Wa Pretty Cure Max Heart: Maji? Maji!? Fight de IN Janai (Game Boy Advance)
  - Futari Wa Pretty Cure Splash Star - Panpaka Game De Zekkouchou! (Nintendo DS)
- Fresh Pretty Cure! Asobi Collection (Nintendo DS)

== G ==
- Gamba no Bouken THE Puzzle Action (Simple Characters Series Vol. 16) (PlayStation)
- Game ni Natta yo! Dokuro-chan ~ Kenkou Shindan Daisakusen
- Gantz: The Game (PlayStation 2)
- Gatchaman THE Shooting (Simple Characters Series Vol. 08) (PlayStation)
- Gate Keepers (PlayStation)
- GD Leen (Super Famicom)
- GeGeGe no Kitaro (Sega Pico, PlayStation, DS, Game Boy Advance, Super Famicom, Famicom, Wii, Game Boy)
- Get Backers: The Stolen City of Infinite (PlayStation 2)
- Get Backers Dakkanoku: Dakkandayo! Zenin Shuugou!! (PlayStation 2)
- Get Backers Dakkanoku: Ura Shinjuku Saikyou Battle (PlayStation 2)
- Ghost in the Shell (based on Ghost in the Shell; PlayStation)
- Ghost in the Shell: Stand Alone Complex (based on Stand Alone Complex; PlayStation 2, PlayStation Portable)
- Ghost Sweeper Mikami (Super Famicom, PC Engine)
- Gintama Dīesu Yorozuya Daisōdō! (Nintendo DS)
- Gintama Gintama Kuesuto Gin-san ga Tenshoku-shitari Sekai o Sukuttari (Nintendo DS)
- Gintama Gintoki vs Hijikata!? Kabuki-cho Gintama Daisōdatsusen!! (Nintendo DS)
- GioGio's Bizarre Adventure (PS2)
- Girlfriend of Steel (based on Neon Genesis Evangelion; Sega Saturn, PlayStation)
- Girlfriend of Steel 2 (based on Neon Genesis Evangelion)
- Girls und Panzer: Senshadō, Kiwamemasu! (PS Vita)
- Goldfish Warning! (Game Boy, Super Famicom)
- Golgo 13: Top Secret Episode (NES, Vic Tokai, 1988)
- Golgo 13 II: The Mafat Conspiracy (NES, Vic Tokai, 1990)
- Gon (Super Famicom)
- Gon: Baku Baku Baku Baku Adventure (Nintendo 3DS)
- Go! Princess Pretty Cure - Sugar Oukoku to Rokunin no Princess! (Nintendo 3DS)
- Eiga Gotoubun no Hanayome ~Kimi to Sugoshita Itsutsu no Omoide~ (PlayStation 4)
- Gotoubun no Hanayome ~Natsu no Omoide mo Gotoubun~ (PlayStation 4)
- Gotoubun no Hanayome Gotopazu Story (PlayStation 4, Nintendo Switch)
- Gotoubun no Hanayome ~Kanojo to Kawasu Itsutsu no Yakusoku~ (PlayStation 4, Nintendo Switch)
- Grand Chase (based on Grand Chase manga series)
- Guilty Crown: Lost Christmas (PC)
- Gundam:
  - Battle Assault 3 featuring Gundam Seed (PlayStation 2)
  - Dynasty Warriors: Gundam (PlayStation 3, Xbox 360)
  - Dynasty Warriors: Gundam 2 (PlayStation 3, Xbox 360)
  - Dynasty Warriors: Gundam 3 (PlayStation 3, Xbox 360)
  - G Gundam THE Battle (Simple Characters 2000 Series Vol. 12) (PlayStation)
  - Gundam THE Gunnin Shogi (Simple Characters 2000 Series Vol. 01) (PlayStation)
  - Gundam 00 (Nintendo DS, PlayStation 2)
  - Gundam 0079 (PlayStation)
  - Gundam Battle Assault (PlayStation)
  - Gundam Battle Assault 2 (PlayStation)
  - Gundam Seed: Battle Assault (GBA)
  - Gundam vs. Gundam (PlayStation Portable)
  - Gundam vs. Gundam Next Plus (PlayStation Portable)
  - Gundam Wing THE Battle (Simple Characters 2000 Series Vol. 13) (PlayStation)
  - Mobile Suit Gundam: Char's Counterattack (PlayStation)
  - Mobile Suit Gundam: Encounters in Space (PlayStation 2)
  - Mobile Suit Gundam: Federation vs. Zeon (PlayStation 2)
  - Mobile Suit Gundam: Journey to Jaburo (PlayStation 2)
  - Mobile Suit Gundam Side Story 0079: Rise from the Ashes (Dreamcast)
  - Mobile Suit Gundam: Zeonic Front (PlayStation 2)
- Gungrave (PlayStation 2)
  - Gungrave: Overdose (2004, PlayStation 2, sequel to Gungrave)
  - Gungrave VR (2017, PlayStation 4, PC)
  - Gungrave G.O.R.E (2022, PlayStation 4, PlayStation 5, PC, Xbox One, Xbox Series X/S)

== H ==
- Hagane no Renkinjutsushi (Game Boy Advance)
- Haikyuu!! Cross Team Match! (Nintendo 3DS)
- Haikyu!! Tsunage! Itadaki no Keshiki!! (Nintendo 3DS)
- Hajime no Ippo: The Fighting! (1997, PlayStation)
- Hajime no Ippo: Victorious Boxers (2000, PlayStation 2, Victorious Boxers: Ippo's Road to Glory)
- Hajime no Ippo: Victorious Boxers Championship Version (2002, PlayStation 2)
- Hajime no Ippo: The Fighting! (2002, Game Boy Advance)
- Hajime no Ippo: The Fighting! - All Stars (2004, PlayStation 2, Victorious Boxers 2: Fighting Spirit)
- Hajime no Ippo 2: Victorious Road (2004, PlayStation 2)
- Hajime no Ippo: Revolution (2007, Wii, Victorious Boxers: Revolutions)
- Hajime no Ippo: The Fighting! DS (2008, Nintendo DS)
- Hajime no Ippo: THE FIGHTING! Portable Victorious Spirits (PlayStation Portable)
- Hajime no Ippo: The Fighting (2014, PlayStation 3)
- Hamtaro (Game Boy Advance)
- Hana no Keiji: Kumo no Kanata ni (Super Famicom)
- Haō Taikei Ryū Knight (Super Famicom)
- Haunted Junction: Seitokai Batch o Oe! (PlayStation)
- Hayate no Gotoku (Nintendo DS, PlayStation Portable)
- Happiness Charge Pretty Cure! Kawarun☆Collection (Nintendo 3DS)
- Heartcatch Pretty Cure! Oshare Collection (Nintendo DS)
- Hetalia (Nintendo DS, PlayStation Portable)
- Hi no Tori (Family Computer, MSX2)
- Hidamari Sketch Dokodemo Sugoroku × 365 (Nintendo DS)
- Higanjima (PlayStation Portable)
- Highschool DXD: Erotic Battle Adventure Game (Nintendo 3DS)
- Highschool! Kimen-gumi (Sega Mark III/Master System)
- Highschool! Kimen-gumi: THE Table Hockey (Simple Characters Series Vol. 05) (PlayStation)
- Himiko Den
- Himouto! Umaru-chan: Umaru Training Plan (PS Vita)
- Hokuto no Ken (see List of Fist of the North Star video games)
- Honkai Impact 3rd (Android, iOS, PC)
- Honō no Dōkyūji: Dodge Danpei
- Hunter × Hunter: Ichi o Tsugomono (2000, WonderSwan)
- Hunter × Hunter: Hunter no Keifu (2000, Game Boy Color)
- Hunter × Hunter: Maraboroshi no Greed Island (2000, PlayStation)
- Hunter × Hunter: Kidan no Hihou (2001, Game Boy Color)
- Hunter × Hunter: Sorezore no Ketsui (2001, WonderSwan Color)
- Hunter × Hunter: Ubawareta Aura Stone (2001, PlayStation)
- Hunter × Hunter: Michibi Kareshi Mono (2001, WonderSwan Color)
- Hunter × Hunter: Ryumyaku no Saidan (2001, PlayStation 2)
- Hunter × Hunter: Minna Tomodachi Daisakusen (2003, Game Boy Advance)
- Hunter × Hunter: Greed Island (2003, WonderSwan Color)
- Hunter x Hunter (In Jump Super Stars) (2005, Nintendo DS)
- Hunter x Hunter (In Jump Ultimate Stars) (2006, Nintendo DS)
- Hunter x Hunter: Wonder Adventure (2012, PlayStation Portable)
- Hunter x Hunter (In J-Stars Victory VS) (2014 PlayStation 3, PlayStation Vita)

== I ==
- Ikkyū-san THE Quiz (Simple Characters Series Vol. 07) (PlayStation)
- Initial D Gaiden (Game Boy)
  - Initial D (PlayStation)
  - Initial D Extreme Stage (PlayStation 3)
  - Initial D: Special Stage (PlayStation 2)
  - Initial D: Another Stage (Game Boy Advance)
  - Initial D Arcade Stage
- Inuyasha
  - Inuyasha (PlayStation)
  - Inuyasha: A Feudal Fairy Tale (PlayStation)
  - Inuyasha: Feudal Combat (PlayStation 2)
  - Inuyasha: Secret of the Cursed Mask (PlayStation 2)
  - Inuyasha: Secret of the Divine Jewel (Nintendo DS)
- Inazuma Eleven (Nintendo DS)
  - Inazuma Eleven Strikers (Wii)
  - Inazuma Eleven Strikers 2012 Xtreme (Wii)
  - Inazuma Eleven GO Strikers 2013 (Wii)
- Ichigeki Sacchu!! HoiHoi-san (PlayStation 2)
- Iria (Super Famicom)

== J ==
- J-Stars Victory Vs (PS3, PS Vita)
- Jankenman (Game Boy)
- Jarinko Chie：Bakudan Musume no Shiawase Sagashi (Famicom)
- Jarinko Chie THE Hanafuda (Simple Characters Series Vol. 04) (PlayStation)
- Jump Super Stars (Nintendo DS)
- Jump Ultimate Stars (Nintendo DS)
- Jungle no Ōja Tar-chan: Sekai Manyū Dai Kakutō no Maki (Super Famicom)
- JoJo's Bizarre Adventure (Super Famicom, 1993)
  - JoJo's Bizarre Adventure (Heritage for the Future) (Dreamcast, PlayStation, PlayStation 3, Xbox 360, 1998)
  - JoJo's Bizarre Adventure: Phantom Blood (PlayStation 2, 2006)
  - JoJo's Bizarre Adventure: All Star Battle (PlayStation 3, 2013)
  - JoJo's Bizarre Adventure: Eyes of Heaven (PlayStation 3, PlayStation 4, 2015)

== K ==
- K-On! Houkago Live!! (PlayStation Portable, PlayStation 3)
- Kachō Kōsaku Shima (Super Famicom, Nintendo DS)
- Kaitou Saint Tail (Game Gear, Sega Saturn)
- Kakutō Ryōri Densetsu Bistro Recipe: Gekitō Food & Battle Hen (Game Boy Color)
- Kakutō Ryōri Densetsu Bistro Recipe: Kettō Bistogarumu Hen (Game Boy Color)
- Kakutō Ryōri Densetsu Bistro Recipe: Wonder Battle Hen (WonderSwan Color)
- Kamiwaza Wanda: Kirakira Ichibangai Kikiippatsu! (Nintendo 3DS)
- Kanbutsu Himouto! Umaru-chan Daratto Puzzle (Nintendo 3DS)
- Karakuri Kengō Den Musashi Lord (Game Boy, Family Computer)
- Katte ni Shirokuma: Mori o Sukue no Maki! (Family Computer)
- Kekko Kamen (PC-98)
- Kimagure Orange Road (PC-98)
- Kimi ni Todoke: Sodateru Omoi (Nintendo DS)
- Kimi ni Todoke: Tsutaeru Kimochi (Nintendo DS)
- Kino no Tabi -the Beautiful World- (PlayStation 2)
- Kino no Tabi -the Beautiful World- II (PlayStation 2)
- Kirarin Revolution: Kira Kira Idol Audition (Nintendo DS)
  - Kirarin Revolution: Na-san to Issho (Nintendo DS)
  - Kilari: Become a Star (Nintendo DS)
  - Kirarin Revolution: Tsukutte Misechao! Kime Kira Stage (Nintendo DS)
  - Kirarin Revolution: Minna de Odorou Furi Furi Debut! (Nintendo DS)
  - Kirarin Revolution: Atsumete Change! Kurikira Coord (Nintendo DS)
- Kishin Douji Zenki (Game Gear)
- Kishin Douji Zenki - Denei Raibu (Super Famicom)
- Kishin Douji Zenki - Retsutou Raiden (Super Famicom)
- Kishin Douji Zenki - Tenchi Meidou (Super Famicom)
- Kishin Douji Zenki FX - Vajura Fight (NEC PC-FX)
- Kiteretsu Daihyakka (Family Computer, Game Boy, Super Famicom)
- Kobayashi ga Kawaisugite Tsurai! Ge-mu demo Kyun Moe MAX ga Tomaranai, Nintendo 3DS
- Konjiki no Gash Bell
- Kōryū no Mimi (Super Famicom)
- KOU-GA-SHA ~Space Odyssey~
- Kujaku Ou (Mark III, Mega Drive, Famicom)
- Kujibiki Unbalance: Kaichō Onegai Smash Fight (PlayStation 2, 2007)
- Kuroshitsuji: Phantom and Ghost (Nintendo DS)
- Kyatto Ninden Teyandee (Famicom)
- Kyo Kara Maoh! Oresama Quest (PC)
- Kyo Kara Maoh! Shin Makoku no Kyuujitsu (PS2)
- Kyo Kara Maoh! Hajimari no Tabi (PS2)
- Kyojin no Hoshi: Slotter Up Core α Shukuhyou! Yusho Panel! Shinka! 2003 Yusho (PlayStation 2)
- Koe De Asobou - HeartCatch Pretty Cure! (Nintendo DS)

== L ==
- La Blue Girl (NEC PC-9801, FM-Towns, Windows 95)
- Laid-Back Camp - Virtual - Fumoto Campsite (Android, iOS, Windows, PlayStation 4, Nintendo Switch)
- Laid-Back Camp - Virtual - Lake Motosu (Android, iOS, Windows, PlayStation 4, Nintendo Switch)
- Last Game
- Legend of Galactic Heroes (Famicom, Super Famicom, PC-98)
- Love★Com (PlayStation 2)
- Love Hina Love Hina Gorgeous (PlayStation 2, Game Boy Advance)
- Lovely Idol (PlayStation 2)
- Little Nemo: The Dream Master (NES)
- Little Witch Academia: VR Broom Racing (Oculus Quest, HTC Vive, Valve Index, PSVR, SteamVR)
- Little Witch Parfait (series)
- Lucky Star (series)
- Lupin III: Treasure of the Sorcerer King (PlayStation 2)
  - Slotter Up Core 5: Lupin Daisuki! Shuyaku ha Zenikage (PlayStation 2)
- Serial: Experiments Lain (PlayStation 1)

== M ==
- Macross (see List of Macross video games)
- Made in Abyss (PlayStation 4)
- Magic Knight Rayearth (Sega Saturn, Game Gear, Game Boy, Super Famicom)
  - Magic Knight Rayearth 2nd: The Missing Colors (Game Boy)
  - Magic Knight Tanjou (Sega Pico)
- Magical Girl Lyrical Nanoha (PlayStation Portable)
- Magical Girl Lyrical Nanoha (PlayStation Portable)
- Magical Girl Pretty Sammy Part 1 (PlayStation)
- Magical Girl Pretty Sammy Part 2 (PlayStation)
- Magical Hat no Buttobi Tabo! Daibōken (Mega Drive)
- Magical Taruruto-kun (Game Boy, Family Computer, Mega Drive, Game Gear, Super Famicom)
- Mahjong Hishō-den: Naki no Ryū (X68000, PC-98, Super Famicom)
- Mahōjin Guru Guru (Super Famicom, Game Boy, Game Boy Color)
- Mahou no Princess Minky Momo (Famicom)
- Mahou Tsukai Kurohime (PlayStation 2)
- Mahou Sensei Negima (Game Boy Advance, PlayStation 2, Nintendo DS, PlayStation Portable)
- Maison Ikkoku (PC Engine, Famicom)
- Marmalade Boy (Super Famicom, Game Boy)
- Martian Successor Nadesico: The Blank of Three Years (Sega Saturn)
- Martian Successor Nadesico: The Mission (Dreamcast)
- Mashin Eiyūden Wataru (PC Engine, Family Computer)
- Maya the Bee (Game Boy Advance)
- Mazinger Z (Arcade, Super Famicom)
- Megazone 23: Aoi Garland (PlayStation 3)
- Mermaid Melody Pichi Pichi Pitch (Game Boy Advance)
  - Mermaid Melody Pichi Pichi Pitch Pitchitto Live Start (Game Boy Advance)
  - Mermaid Melody Pichi Pichi Pitch Party (Game Boy Advance)
- Miracle Girls (Super Famicom)
- Miss Princess MissPuri (Nintendo DS)
- Mitsume ga Tōru
  - Mitsume ga Tōru: The Three-Eyed One Comes Here (MSX, Natsume, April 1989)
  - Mitsume ga Tōru (Famicom, Tomy, 1992)
- Mizushima Shinji All-Stars vs Pro Yakyuu: Gekito Pro Yakyuu (PlayStation 2)
- Mobile Battleship Nadesico (Sega Saturn)
- Mobile Battleship Nadesico: Ruriruri Mahjong (Game Boy Color)
- Mon-Colle Knights: Mumon Tengai Mon-Colle Knight GB (Game Boy Color)
- Monochrome Factor Cross Road (PlayStation 2, PlayStation 3)
- Mōryō Senki MADARA (Famicom)
- Mōryō Senki MADARA 2 (Super Famicom)
- Musashi no Ken – Tadaima Shugyō Chū (Famicom)
- Mushishi: Amefuru Sato (Nintendo DS, 2008)
- MS Saga: A New Dawn (PlayStation 2; a crossover game that featured many mobile suits and was meant to bring in new fans)
- My Hero Academia: Battle for All (Nintendo 3DS, 2016)
- My Hero One's Justice (PlayStation 4, Xbox One, Microsoft Windows, Nintendo Switch)
- My Hero One's Justice 2 (PlayStation 4, Xbox One, Microsoft Windows, Nintendo Switch, Google Stadia)
- MysticLegend

== N ==
- Nagagutsu o Haita Neko: Sekai Isshū 80 Nichi Dai Bōken (Family Computer)
- Nakayoshi to Issho (Famicom)
  - Welcome Nakayoshi Park (Game Boy)
  - Panic in Nakayoshi World (Super Famicom)
  - Nakayoshi All-Stars: Mezase! Gakuen Idol! (Nintendo DS)
- Nanatsu no Taizai: Knights of Britannia (PlayStation 4, 2018)
- Nanatsu no Taizai: Unjust Sin (Nintendo 3DS, 2015)
- Nana (PlayStation 2)
- Nana: Everything Is Controlled By The Great Demon King!? (PlayStation Portable)
- Nana: Live Staff Mass Recruiting! Beginners Welcome (Nintendo DS)
- Nangoku Shōnen Papuwa-kun (Game Boy, Super Famicom)
- Nari Kids Park: HUGtto! Pretty Cure (Nintendo Switch)
- Naruto: The Broken Bond (Xbox 360)
  - Naruto: Clash of Ninja (GameCube)
  - Naruto: Clash of Ninja 2 (GameCube)
  - Naruto: Clash of Ninja Revolution (Wii)
  - Naruto: Clash of Ninja Revolution 2 (Wii)
  - Naruto: Gekitō Ninja Taisen! 3 (GameCube)
  - Naruto: Gekitō Ninja Taisen! 4 (GameCube)
  - Naruto: Konoha Ninpouchou (WonderSwan Color)
  - Naruto: Konoha Senki (Game Boy Advance)
  - Naruto: Ninja Council (Game Boy Advance)
  - Naruto: Ninja Council 2 (Game Boy Advance)
  - Naruto: Ninja Council 3 (Nintendo DS)
  - Naruto: Path of the Ninja (Naruto RPG: Uketsugareshi Hi no Ishi) (Nintendo DS)
  - Naruto: Path of the Ninja 2 (Naruto RPG 3: Reijū vs. Konoha Shōtai) (Nintendo DS)
  - Naruto: Rise of a Ninja (Xbox 360)
  - Naruto: Shinobi no Sato no Jintori Kassen (PlayStation)
  - Naruto: Ultimate Ninja (PlayStation 2, PlayStation portable)
  - Naruto: Ultimate Ninja 2 (PlayStation 2, PlayStation portable)
  Naruto: Ultimate Ninja 3 (PlayStation 2, PlayStation portable)
  - Naruto: Ultimate Ninja Storm (PlayStation 3)
  Naruto: Uzumaki Chronicles (PlayStation 2)
  - Naruto: Uzumaki Chronicles 2 (PlayStation 2)
  - Naruto Shippūden: Clash of Ninja Revolution 3 (Wii)
  - Naruto Shippūden: Gekitō Ninja Taisen! EX (Wii)
  - Naruto Shippūden: Gekitō Ninja Taisen! EX 2 (Wii)
  - Naruto Shippūden: Gekitō Ninja Taisen! EX 3 (Wii)
  - Naruto Shippūden: Gekitō Ninja Taisen! Special (Wii)
  - Naruto Shippūden: Legends: Akatsuki Rising (PlayStation Portable)
  - Naruto Shippuden: Naruto vs. Sasuke (Nintendo DS)
  - Naruto Shippūden: Ninja Council 4 (Nintendo DS)
  - Naruto Shippuden: Shinobi Rumble (Nintendo DS)
  - Naruto Shippūden: Ultimate Ninja 4 (Naruto Shippūden: Narutimate Accel) (PlayStation 2)
  - Naruto Shippūden: Ultimate Ninja 5 (Naruto Shippūden: Narutimate Accel 2) (PlayStation 2)
  - Naruto Shippuden: Ultimate Ninja Impact (PlayStation Portable)
  - Naruto Shippuden: Ultimate Ninja Storm 2 (PlayStation 3), (Xbox 360)
  - Naruto Shippuden: Ultimate Ninja Storm 3 (PlayStation 3), (Xbox 360), (PC)
  - Naruto Shippuden: Ultimate Ninja Storm 4 (Xbox One), (PlayStation 4), (PC)
  - Naruto Shippuden: Ultimate Ninja Storm Generations (PlayStation 3), (Xbox 360)
  - Naruto Shippuden: Ultimate Ninja Storm Revolution (PlayStation 3), (Xbox 360), (PC)
- Natsuki Crisis Battle (Super Famicom)
- Neon Genesis Evangelion: Neon Genesis Evangelion 64 (Nintendo 64, 1999)
- Neon Genesis Evangelion: Ayanami Raising Project (PC, Dreamcast, PlayStation 2, Nintendo DS)
- Neon Genesis Evangelion: Neon Genesis Evangelion 2 (PlayStation 2, 2004)
- Neon Genesis Evangelion: Shinji Ikari Raising Project (Windows, 2004)
- Neon Genesis Evangelion: The Secret of Evangelion (PlayStation 2, 2006)
- Neon Genesis Evangelion: Meitantei Evangelion (PlayStation 2, 2007)
- Neon Genesis Evangelion: Battle Orchestra (PlayStation 2, 2008)
- Neon Genesis Evangelion: Evangelion: Jo (PlayStation 2, 2009)
- New Mobile Report Gundam Wing: Endless Duel (Super Famicom)
- Nichijou: Uchuujin (PlayStation Portable)
- Ninja Hattori-kun (Family Computer)
- Nintama Rantarō (Game Boy, Game Boy Color, Super Famicom, Windows, Playdia, Sega Pico, Nintendo 64, Nintendo DS)

== O ==
- Ojomajo Doremi (Sega Pico, PlayStation)
- Obake no Q-tarō: WanWan Panic (Family Computer)
- Oishinbo (Family Computer, Nintendo DS)
- One Piece (Game Boy Advance)
  - One Piece: Gear Spirits (Nintendo DS)
  - One Piece Grand Adventure (PlayStation 2, GameCube)
  - One Piece Grand Battle! (PlayStation 2, PSone, GameCube)
  - One Piece Grand Battle 3 (PlayStation 2, GameCube)
  - One Piece: Pirate Warriors (PlayStation 3)
  - One Piece: Pirates Carnival (PlayStation 2, GameCube)
  - One Piece: Pirate Warriors 2 (PS3, PS Vita)
  - One Piece Treasure Battle! (GameCube)
  - One Piece: Unlimited Adventure (Wii)
  - One Piece: Unlimited Cruise: The Treasure Beneath the Waves (Wii)
  - One Piece: Unlimited Cruise 2: Awakening of a Hero (Wii)
  - One Piece: Pirate Warriors 3
  - One Piece: Unlimited World Red
  - One Piece: Burning Blood
  - One Piece: World Seeker
  - One Piece: Pirate Warriors 4
  - One Piece Odyssey
- Ookiku Furikabutte: Honto no Ace ni Nareru kamo (Nintendo DS, 2007)
- Ore no Imouto ga Konnani Kawaii Wake ga Nai. HappyenD (PlayStation 3)
- Ore no Imouto ga Konna ni Kawaii Wake ga Nai Portable (PlayStation Portable)
- Ore no Imouto ga Konnani Kawaii Wake ga Nai Portable ga Tsuzuku Wake ga Nai (PlayStation Portable)
- Ore no Imouto Maker EX (PlayStation Portable)
- Osomatsu-kun: Hachamecha Gekijō (Mega Drive)
- Osu!! Karate Bu (Super Famicom)
- Ouran Koukou Host Club (PlayStation 2)
- Ouran Koukou Host Club DS (Nintendo DS)

== P ==
- Parasol Henbee (Game Boy, Family Computer)
- Patlabor (Famicom Disk System, Game Boy, Mega Drive, Turbo CD, PlayStation, PlayStation Portable)
- Perman (Famicom)
- The Pet Girl of Sakurasou(PSP)
- Pokonyan! (Game Boy, Super Famicom)
- Pretty Cure All Stars Everyone Gather ☆ Let's Dance! (Wii)
- Pretty Cure Connection Puzzlun
- Pretty Cure Online
- Pretty Soldier Sailor Moon (Arcade)
- The Prince of Tennis - Driving Smash! Side Genius (Nintendo DS)
- The Prince of Tennis - Driving Smash! Side King (Nintendo DS)
- Princess Princess: Hime-tachi no Abunai Hōkago (PlayStation 2)
- Project Arms in Europe(Germany) only Arms (PlayStation 2)
- Puella Magi Madoka Magica Portable (PlayStation Portable)
- Puella Magi Madoka Magica: The Battle Pentagram (PS Vita)
- Puss 'n Boots: Pero's Great Adventure NES

== Q ==
- The Quiz Master

== R ==
- R: Rock'n Riders (PlayStation)
- Raki Suta Moe Doriru
- Ranma 1/2 (Super Famicom, PlayStation, Game Boy, PC 98, Mega-CD)
- Rave Master (GameCube)
- Rave Master: Special Attack Force! (Game Boy Advance)
- Really? Really! (PC, Nintendo DS)
- Re:Zero − Starting Life in Another World: Death or Kiss (PS Vita, PlayStation 4)
- Re:Zero − Starting Life in Another World: The Prophecy of the Throne (Windows, PlayStation 4, Nintendo Switch)
- Rebuild of Evangelion Sound Impact (PlayStation Portable)
- Ring ni Kakero (Super Famicom)
- Ro-Kyu-Bu! Naisho no Shutter Chance (PS Vita)
- Rokudenashi Blues (Family Computer, Super Famicom)
- Rosario + Vampire Capu2: Koi to Yume no Rhapsodia (PlayStation 2)
- Rosario + Vampire: Tanabata no Miss Yōkai Gakuen (Nintendo DS)
- Rozen Maiden: ALiBAT (freeware game for PC)
- Rozen Maiden: Duellwalzer (PlayStation 2)
- Rozen Maiden: Gebetgarten (PlayStation 2)
- Rurouni Kenshin: Enjō! Kyoto Rinne (PlayStation 2)
- Rurouni Kenshin: Meiji Kenkaku Roman Tan Saisen (PlayStation Portable)
- Rurouni Kenshin: Meiji Kenyaku Romantan (PlayStation)
- RWBY: Grimm Eclipse (PlayStation 4, Xbox One Microsoft Windows, macOS)
- RWBY: Crystal Match (Android, iOS)
- RWBY: Amity Arena (Android)
- RWBY Deckbuilding Game (Android, Microsoft Windows)
- RWBY (mobile game) (iOS, Android, PC)

== S ==
- Saikano (PlayStation 2)
- Sailor Moon (see List of Sailor Moon video games)
- Saint Seiya (see List of Saint Seiya video games)
- Sakigake!! Otokojuku (Game Boy, Family Computer)
  - Sakigake!! Otokojuku THE Dodgeball (Simple Characters Series Vol. 10) (PlayStation)
  - Sakigake!! Otokojuku (PlayStation 2)
  - Sakigake!! Otokojuku (Simple 2000 Series Ultimate Vol. 34) (PlayStation 2)
  - Sakigake!! Otokojuku ~Nihon yo, Kore ga Otoko de Aru!~ (PlayStation 3)
- Salaryman Kintaro:Jissen Pachislo Hisshoho! (PlayStation 2)
- Samurai 7 (PlayStation 2)
- Samurai Champloo (PlayStation 2)
- Samurai Deeper Kyo (GBA)
  - Samurai Deeper Kyo (PlayStation 2)
- Scarlet Nexus (Windows, PlayStation 4, PlayStation 5, Xbox One, Xbox Series X, Xbox Series S; released alongside the anime series.)
- School Rumble: 2nd Semester – Summer Training Camp (of fear?)!! Ghost's Appearing in the Western-styled Building!? Fighting Over the Treasure!!! (PlayStation 2)
- School Rumble: Sis This is Serious! (PlayStation Portable)
- School Rumble: Sleep Helps a Girl Grow (PlayStation 2)
- Science Ninja Team Gatchaman (Amstrad CPC, Commodore 64, ZX Spectrum, PC-98, PlayStation, PlayStation 2)
- Serial Experiments Lain (video game) (PlayStation)
- Shaman King Cho-Senjiryakketsu 2 (Game Boy Advance)
  - Shaman King Cho-Senjiryakketsu 3 (Game Boy Advance)
  - Shaman King Cho-Senjiryakketsu: Funbari Version (Game Boy Color)
  - Shaman King Cho-Senjiryakketsu: Meramera Version (Game Boy Color)
  - Shaman King: Funbari Spirits (PlayStation 2)
  - Shaman King: Legacy of the Spirits - Soaring Hawk (Game Boy Advance)
  - Shaman King: Legacy of the Spirits - Sprinting Wolf (Game Boy Advance)
  - Shaman King: Master of Spirits (Game Boy Advance)
  - Shaman King: Master of Spirits 2 (Game Boy Advance)
  - Shaman King: Power of Spirit (PlayStation 2)
  - Shaman King: Soul Fight (GameCube)
  - Shaman King: Spirit of Shamans (PlayStation)
  - Shaman King: Will to the Future (WonderSwan Color)
- Shijou Saikyou no Deshi Kenichi (PlayStation 2)
- Shin Lucky Star Moe Drill
- Shin Lucky Star Moe Drill Tabidachi
- Shion no Ō (Nintendo DS, 2008)
- Shobushi Densetsu Tetsuya (PlayStation 2)
  - Shobushi Densetsu Tetsuya 2: Genjin Chojo Kessen (PlayStation 2)
- Shogo: Mobile Armor Division (PC)
- Shojo Kakumei Utena (Sega Saturn)
- Shokuhoko no Soma - Yuujou to Kizuna no Hitosara (Nintendo 3DS)
- Shoukoushi Cedie (Family Computer)
- Shugo Chara! Three Eggs and the Joker in Love! (Nintendo DS)
- Shugo Chara! Amu's Rainbow-Colored Chara Change! (Nintendo DS)
- Shugo Chara! Norinori! Chara Formation-Rhythm (Nintendo DS)
- Simoun : Rose War ~Ri Mājon of Sealing~ (シムーン 異薔薇戦争〜封印のリ·マージョン〜, Shimūn Ibara Sensō 〜Fūin no Ri Mājon〜) (PS2)
- Skip Beat (PlayStation 2)
- Slam Dunk (Super Famicom, Sega Saturn, iOS)
- Slayers (Super Famicom)
- Slayers Royal (Sega Saturn)
- Slayers Royal 2 (Sega Saturn)
- Soar High! Isami
- Sonic X (Leapster)
- Sonic Soldier Borgman (Sega Mark III/Master System)
- Sora no Otoshimono Forte: Dreamy Season (Nintendo DS)
- Soul Eater: Battle Resonance (PlayStation 2, PlayStation Portable)
- Soul Eater: Monotone Princess (Wii)
- Soul Eater: Plot of Medusa (Nintendo DS)
- Spice and Wolf VR (Windows, PlayStation 4, Nintendo Switch, Oculus Go, Oculus Quest)
- Spice&Wolf VR2 (Windows, PlayStation 4, Nintendo Switch, Oculus Go, Oculus Quest)
- Spriggan: Lunar Verse (PlayStation)
- Super Bikkuriman (Super Famicom)
- Super Doll Licca-chan (Game Boy Color)
- Super GALS! Kotobuki Ran (Game Boy Color)
- Super GALS! Kotobuki Ran 2 ~Miracle -> Getting~ (Game Boy Color)
- Super GALS! Kotobuki Ran Special -> Coolmen Get you Gals Party -> (PlayStation)
- Sutobasu Yarō Shō (Super Famicom)
  - Episode 1: Suki na Mono wa Suki Dakara Shouganai!! -FIRST LIMIT- (PC, PlayStation 2)
  - Episode 2: Suki na Mono wa Suki Dakara Shouganai!! -TARGET NIGHTS- (PC, PlayStation 2)
  - Episode 3: Suki na Mono wa Suki Dakara Shouganai!! -RAIN- (PC, PlayStation 2)
  - Episode 4: Suki na Mono wa Suki Dakara Shouganai!! +White Flower+ (PC)
- Sword Art Online Alicization Rising Steel (Android, iOS)
- Sword Art Online: Fatal Bullet (Windows, Xbox One, PlayStation4, Nintendo Switch)
- Sword Art Online: Hollow Fragment (PS Vita, PS4)
- Sword Art Online: Infinity Moment (PlayStation Portable)
- Sword Art Online: Integral Factor (Android, iOS)
- Sword Art Online: Lost Song (PS3, PS Vita)
- SWORD ART ONLINE:Memory Defrag (Android, iOS)
- Sword of the Berserk: Guts' Rage (Dreamcast)
- Smile Pretty Cure! Let's Go! Märchen World (Nintendo 3DS)
- Suite Pretty Cure: Melody Collection (Nintendo DS)

== T ==
- Takahashi Meijin no Bug-tte Honey (Famicom, Hudson Soft, June 5, 1987)
- Teasing Master Takagi-san VR - 1st Semester (Oculus Quest, HTC Vive, Valve Index)
- Teasing Master Takagi-san VR - 2nd Semester (Oculus Quest, HTC Vive, Valve Index)
- Tekkaman Blade (Game Boy, Super Famicom, NEC PC-9801)
- Tekken Tag Tournament Two (Xbox 360, PlayStation 3)
- Tenchi Muyo! Game-Hen (Super Famicom)
- Tenchi Muyo! Toukou Muyou (PlayStation, Sega Saturn)
- Tengen Toppa Gurren Lagann
- Tennis no Oujisama 2005 Crystal Drive (Nintendo DS)
- Tennis no Oujisama: Boys Be Glorious (Nintendo DS)
- Tennis no Oujisama: Girls Be Gracious (Nintendo DS)
- Tennis no Oujisama: Smash Hits (PlayStation 2)
- Tennis no Oujisama: Smash Hits 2 (PlayStation 2)
- Tensai Bakabon (Sega Mark III/Master System)
- Tetsuwan Atom (Famicom, Konami, February 26, 1988)
- Tetsuwan Atom (Super Famicom, Banpresto, February 18, 1994)
- The Eminence in Shadow: Master of Garden (Windows, Android, iOS, November 29, 2022)
- Toaru Majutsu no Index (PlayStation Portable)
- To Love-Ru Darkness: Battle Ecstasy (PS Vita)
- Tokyo Mew Mew (Game Boy Advance, PlayStation)
- Top Striker (Family Computer)
- Toradora! Portable (PlayStation Portable)
- Tottemo! Luckyman: Everyone Loves Lucky Cookie!! (Game Boy)
- Tottemo! Luckyman: Lucky Cookie Roulette Assault!! (Super Famicom)
- Trigun: The Planet Gunsmoke
- Tsubasa Chronicle (Nintendo DS)
- Tsuyoshi Shikkari Shinasai: Taisen Puzzle-dama (Super Famicom)
- Tsurikichi Sanpei THE Tsuri (Simple Characters 2000 Series Vol. 09) (PlayStation)

== U ==
- U.N. Squadron, see Area 88
- Uchuu no Stellvia (PlayStation 2, Game Boy Advance)
- Ultraman (Super Famicom, Mega Drive)
- Ueki no Hōsoku (PlayStation 2, Game Boy Advance)
- Urotsukidoji (PC98)
- Urusei Yatsura (MSX2)
  - Urusei Yatsura: Lum no Wedding Bell (1986, Famicom)
  - Urusei Yatsura (1987, Fujitsu FM-7)
  - Urusei Yatsura: Koi no Survival Party (1987, MSX)
  - Urusei Yatsura: Stay With You (1990, PC Engine CD)
  - Urusei Yatsura: Miss Tomobiki o Sagase! (1992, Game Boy)
  - Urusei Yatsura: Dear My Friends (1994, Mega-CD)
  - Urusei Yatsura: Endless Summer (2005, Nintendo DS)
- Ushio and Tora (Famicom, Super Famicom)
- Utsurun Desu.: Kawauso Hawaii e Iku!!! (Family Computer)

== V ==
- Vampire Hunter D (PlayStation)
- Vampire Knight (DS)
- Venus Wars (Famicom)
- Victorious Boxers - Ippo's Road to Glory (PlayStation 2, 2000)
  - Victorious Boxers 2 - Fighting Spirit (PlayStation 2, 2004)
  - Victorious Boxers: Revolution (Wii, 2007)
- Violinist of Hameln (Super Famicom)

== W ==
- W Wish
- Wagamama Fairy Mirumo de Pon! (Game Boy Advance)
- Wangan Midnight (Arcade, PS2, PS3)
- Wedding Peach (Super Famicom, Game Boy, PC-98)
- Wedding Peach: Doki Doki Oiro-naoshi Fashion Dai-sakusen (PlayStation)
- World Trigger: Borderless Mission (PlayStation Vita)

== X ==
- X: Card of Fate (WonderSwan Color)
- X: Unmei no Sentaku (PlayStation)
- XXXHolic (PlayStation 2)

== Y ==
- Yadamon (Super Famicom)
- Yahari Game demo Ore no Seishun Rabu Kome wa Machigatteiru (PlayStation Vita, PlayStation 4)
- Yes! Pretty Cure 5 (Nintendo DS)
  - Yes! Pretty Cure 5 GoGo! - Zenin ShūGo! Dream Festival (Nintendo DS)
- Youchien Senki MADARA (Super Famicom)
- You're Under Arrest (PlayStation, 2001)
- Yu-Gi-Oh! 5D's: Decade Duels (Xbox 360, PlayStation 3)
  - Yu-Gi-Oh! 5D's: Master of the Cards (Wii)
  - Yu-Gi-Oh! 5D's Mobile (i-mode, EZweb, Yahoo! Mobile)
  - Yu-Gi-Oh! 5D's Stardust Accelerator: WORLD CHAMPIONSHIP 2009 (Nintendo DS)
  - Yu-Gi-Oh! 5D's: Tag Force 4 (PlayStation Portable)
  - Yu-Gi-Oh! 5D's: Tag Force 5 (PlayStation Portable)
  - Yu-Gi-Oh! 5D's: Tag Force 6 (PlayStation Portable)
  - Yu-Gi-Oh! 5D's: Wheelie Breakers (Wii)
  - Yu-Gi-Oh! 5D's WORLD CHAMPIONSHIP 2010: Reverse of Arcadia (Nintendo DS)
  - Yu-Gi-Oh! 5D's WORLD CHAMPIONSHIP 2011: Over the Nexus (Nintendo DS)
  - Yu-Gi-Oh! Arc-V Tag Force Special (PlayStation Portable)
  - Yu-Gi-Oh! Capsule Monsters Coliseum (PlayStation 2)
  - Yu-Gi-Oh! The Dawn of Destiny (Xbox)
  - Yu-Gi-Oh! Duel Arena (PC)
  - Yu-Gi-Oh! Duel Monsters (Game Boy)
  - Yu-Gi-Oh! Duel Monsters 4: Battle of the Powerful Duelists (Game Boy Color)
  - Yu-Gi-Oh! Duel Monsters 5: Expert 1 (Game Boy Advance)
  - Yu-Gi-Oh! Duel Monsters 6: Expert 2 (Game Boy Advance)
  - Yu-Gi-Oh! Duel Monsters 7: The Duelcity Legend (Game Boy Advance)
  - Yu-Gi-Oh! Duel Monsters 8: Great False God of Destruction (Game Boy Advance)
  - Yu-Gi-Oh! Duel Monsters Expert 2006 (Game Boy Advance)
  - Yu-Gi-Oh! Duel Monsters Expert 3 (Game Boy Advance)
  - Yu-Gi-Oh! Duel Monsters GX: Aim to be Duel King! (Game Boy Advance)
  - Yu-Gi-Oh! Duel Monsters GX: Card Almanac (Nintendo DS)
  - Yu-Gi-Oh! Duel Monsters GX: Spirit Summoner (Nintendo DS)
  - Yu-Gi-Oh! Duel Monsters GX: Tag Force (PlayStation Portable)
  - Yu-Gi-Oh! Duel Monsters GX: Tag Force 2 (PlayStation Portable)
  - Yu-Gi-Oh! Duel Monsters GX: Tag Force Evolution (PlayStation 2)
  - Yu-Gi-Oh! Duel Monsters II: Dark Duel Stories (Game Boy Color)
  - Yu-Gi-Oh! Duel Monsters III: Tri-Holy God Event (Game Boy Color)
  - Yu-Gi-Oh! Duel Monsters International 2 (Game Boy Advance)
  - Yu-Gi-Oh! Duel Monsters: Nightmare Troubadour (Nintendo DS)
  - Yu-Gi-Oh! Duel Monsters WORLD CHAMPIONSHIP 2007 (Nintendo DS)
  - Yu-Gi-Oh! Duel Monsters WORLD CHAMPIONSHIP 2008 (Nintendo DS)
  - Yu-Gi-Oh! Dungeon Dice Monsters (Game Boy Advance)
  - Yu-Gi-Oh! Falsebound Kingdom: The Confined Imaginary Kingdom (GameCube)
  - Yu-Gi-Oh! Millennium Duels (Xbox 360, PlayStation 3)
  - Yu-Gi-Oh! Monster Capsule: Breed & Battle (PlayStation)
  - Yu-Gi-Oh! Monster Capsule GB (Game Boy Color)
  - Yu-Gi-Oh! ONLINE (PC)
  - Yu-Gi-Oh! ONLINE DUEL ACCELERATOR (PC)
  - Yu-Gi-Oh! ONLINE DUEL EVOLUTION (PC)
  - Yu-Gi-Oh! Power of Chaos: Joey the Passion (PC)
  - Yu-Gi-Oh! Power of Chaos: Kaiba the Revenge (PC)
  - Yu-Gi-Oh! Power of Chaos: Yugi the Destiny (PC)
  - Yu-Gi-Oh! Sugoroku's Board Game (Game Boy Advance)
  - Yu-Gi-Oh! True Duel Monsters II: Inherited Memories (PlayStation 2)
  - Yu-Gi-Oh! True Duel Monsters: Sealed Memories (PlayStation)
  - Yu-Gi-Oh! Worldwide Edition: Stairway to the destined duel (Game Boy Advance)
  - Yu-Gi-Oh! ZeXal: Clash! Duel Carnival! (Nintendo 3DS)
- Yuru Camp: Have a Nice Day! (PlayStation 4, Nintendo Switch)
  - Yuru Camp: Virtual Camp (Microsoft Windows, Nintendo Switch, PlayStation 4, iOS, Android)
- The Battle of Yu Yu Hakusho: Shitō! Ankoku Bujutsu Kai (Arcade and PlayStation 2)
  - Yu Yu Hakusho (Super Famicom, Game Boy, 3DO)
  - Yu Yu Hakusho 2: Kakutou no Sho (Super Famicom)
  - Yu Yu Hakusho: Bakutō Ankoku Bujutsu Kai (Famicom)
  - Yu Yu Hakusho Dai-Ni-Dan: Ankoku Bujutsu Kai Hen (Game Boy)
  - Yu Yu Hakusho Dai-San-Dan: Makai no Tobira (Game Boy)
  - Yu Yu Hakusho Dai-Yon-Dan: Makai Tōitsu Hen (Game Boy)
  - Yu Yu Hakusho: Dark Tournament (PlayStation 2)
  - Yu Yu Hakusho DS: Ankoku Bujutsu Kai Hen (Nintendo DS)
  - Yu Yu Hakusho Final (Super Famicom)
  - Yu Yu Hakusho Forever (PlayStation 2)
  - Yu Yu Hakusho Gaiden MD (Mega Drive)
  - Yu Yu Hakusho: Horobishi Mono no Gyakushū (Game Gear)
  - Yu Yu Hakusho II: Gekitou! Shichi Kyō no Tatakai (Game Gear)
  - Yu Yu Hakusho: Makyō Tōitsusen (Mega Drive)
  - Yu Yu Hakusho: Spirit Detective (Game Boy Advance)
  - Yu Yu Hakusho: Tokubetsu Hen (Super Famicom)
  - Yu Yu Hakusho: Tournament Tactics (Game Boy Advance)
  - Yu Yu Hakusho: Yamishōbu! Ankoku Bujutsu Kai (PC Engine)

== Z ==
- Zatch Bell! series
  - Zatch Bell! Electric Arena (Game Boy Advance)
  - Zatch Bell! Mamodo Battles (GameCube, PS2)
  - Zatch Bell! Mamodo Fury (GameCube, PS2)
- Zero no Tsukaima: Muma ga Tsumugu Yokaze no Nocturne (PS2)
- Zillion (Master System)
  - Zillion II (Master System)
- Zoids (List of Zoids Video Games)
  - Zoids: Battle Legends (GameCube)

== Release timeline ==
Title	Title	Original Release	Genre/Type	Franchise	Developer	Publisher	Platform(s)
2019	One Piece Bounty Rush	January 31, 2019	Team-based PvP	One Piece	Bandai Namco	Bandai Namco	Android, iOS
2019	Jump Force	February 14, 2019	Fighting	Crossover (Shōnen Jump)	Spike Chunsoft	Bandai Namco	Windows, PS4, XBO, Switch
2019	Dragon Ball: Awakening	February 26, 2019	DCCG	Dragon Ball	CMGE	CMGE	Android, iOS
2019	One Piece: World Seeker	March 14, 2019	Action-adventure	One Piece	Ganbarion	Bandai Namco	Windows, PS4, XBO, Stadia
2019	Super Dragon Ball Heroes: World Mission	April 5, 2019	DCCG	Dragon Ball	Dimps	Bandai Namco	Windows, Switch
2020	Dragon Ball Z: Kakarot	January 16, 2020	ARPG	Dragon Ball	CyberConnect2	Bandai Namco	Windows, PS4, XBO, Switch
2020	One-Punch Man: A Hero Nobody Knows	February 27, 2020	Fighting	One-Punch Man	Spike Chunsoft	Bandai Namco	Windows, PS4, XBO
2020	My Hero One's Justice 2	March 12, 2020	Fighting	My Hero Academia	Byking	Bandai Namco	Windows, PS4, XBO, Switch
2020	One Piece Bon! Bon! Journey!	March 17, 2020	Puzzle	One Piece	Bandai Namco	Bandai Namco	Android, iOS
2020	One Piece: Pirate Warriors 4	March 27, 2020	Beat 'em up	One Piece	Omega Force	Bandai Namco	Windows, PS4, XBO, Switch
2020	Sword Art Online: Alicization Lycoris	July 10, 2020	ARPG	Sword Art Online	Aquria	Bandai Namco	Windows, PS4, XBO
2020	Fairy Tail	July 30, 2020	RPG	Fairy Tail	Gust Co.	Koei Tecmo	Windows, PS4, Switch
2020	Captain Tsubasa: Rise of New Champions	August 27, 2020	Sports	Captain Tsubasa	Tamsoft	Bandai Namco	Windows, PS4, Switch
2020	Little Witch Academia: VR Broom Racing	October 13, 2020	Racing	Little Witch Academia	UNIVRS	UNIVRS	Oculus Quest, PSVR, SteamVR
2020	My Hero Academia: The Strongest Hero	December 3, 2020	ARPG	My Hero Academia	Xin Yuan Studios	Komoe Game	Android, iOS
2020	Fairy Tail Forces Unite!	December 30, 2020	Turn-based RPG	Fairy Tail	Morefun Studio	Tencent Games	Android, iOS
2021	Re:Zero − Starting Life in Another World: The Prophecy of the Throne	January 28, 2021	VN, SRPG	Re:Zero	Chime	Spike Chunsoft	Windows, PS4, Switch
2021	One Piece: The Voyage	April 23, 2021	ARPG	One Piece	CMGE	Nuverse (ByteDance)	Android, iOS
2021	Demon Slayer: Kimetsu no Yaiba – The Hinokami Chronicles	October 14, 2021	Fighting	Demon Slayer	CyberConnect2	Aniplex, Sega	Windows, PS4, PS5, XBO, XBSX, Switch
2021	Shaman King: Funbari Chronicle	December 8, 2021	RPG	Shaman King	Studio Z	Studio Z	Android, iOS
2022	Dragon Ball: The Breakers	TBA	Survival	Dragon Ball	Dimps	Bandai Namco	Windows, PS4, XBO, Switch
2022	Made in Abyss: Binary Star Falling into Darkness	TBA	ARPG	Made in Abyss	Spike Chunsoft	Spike Chunsoft	Windows, PS4, Switch
2022	Fullmetal Alchemist Mobile	TBA	Action-adventure	Fullmetal Alchemist	Square Enix	Square Enix	Android, iOS
2022	Black Clover Mobile	TBA	RPG	Black Clover	Vic Game Studios	Pearl Abyss	Android, iOS
2022	Jujutsu Kaisen: Phantom Parade	TBA	RPG	Jujutsu Kaisen	Sumzap	Sumzap	Android, iOS
2023	Inazuma Eleven: Victory Road	2023	RPG, Sports	Inazuma Eleven	Level-5	Level-5	Android, iOS, PS4, Switch
TBA	One Piece: Project Fighter	TBA	Fighting	One Piece	Tencent Games	Tencent Games	Android, iOS

== See also ==
- List of anime based on video games
- List of comics based on video games
- List of hentai computer games
- List of video games based on comics
- List of video games based on cartoons
- List of video games based on films
