= Yūko Miyamura =

Japanese actress (born 1972)

- 宮村 優子
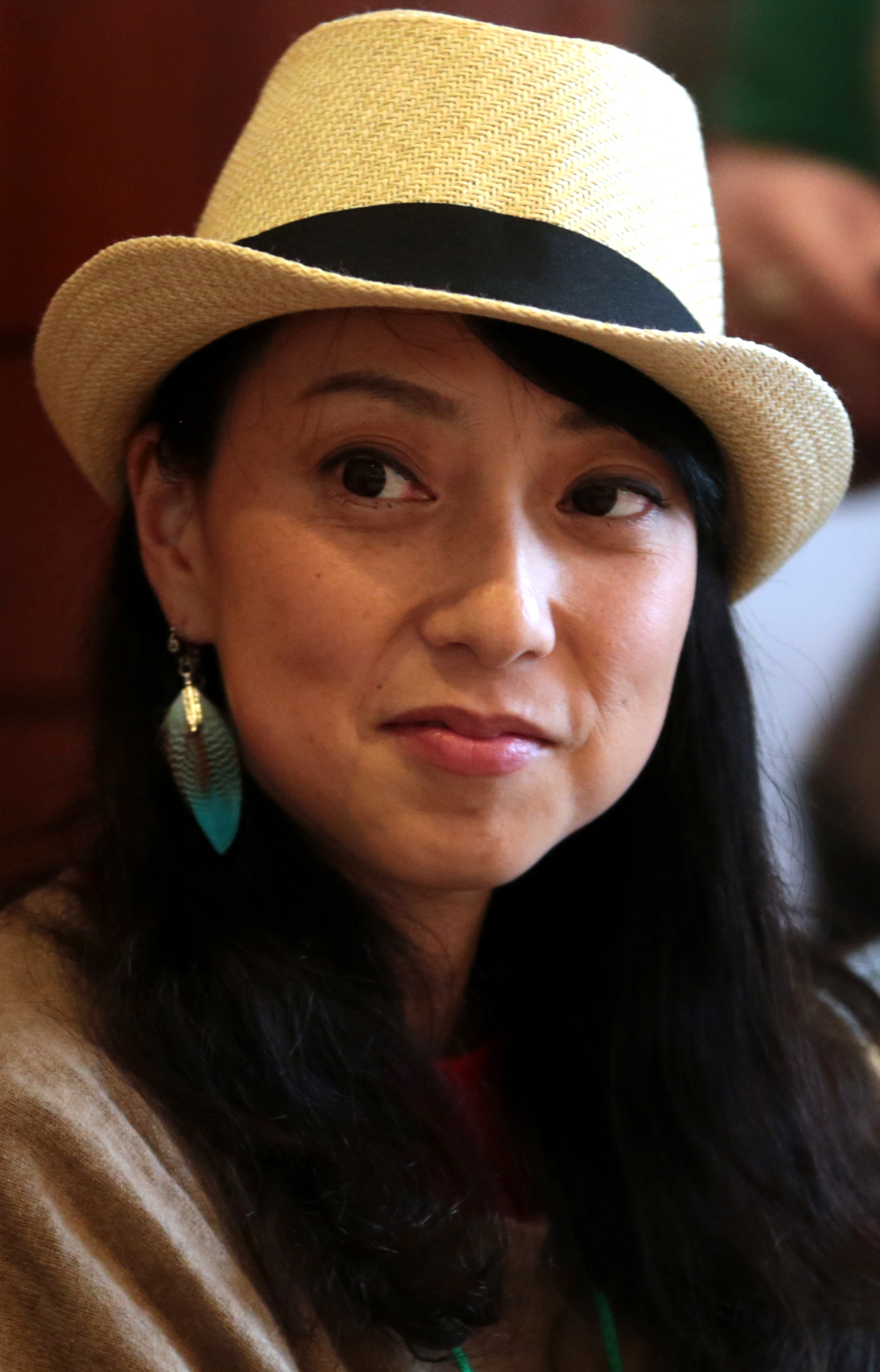
- Miyamura at the 2017 Saboten Con
- Born: December 4, 1972 (age 53); Tarumi-ku, Kobe, Hyōgo Prefecture, Japan
- Other name: Miyamū (みやむー)
- Occupations: Actress; voice actress; singer; sound director
- Years active: 1994–present
- Agent: JAE Promotion
- Notable work: Detective Conan as Kazuha Toyama; Neon Genesis Evangelion as Asuka Langley Soryu; Street Fighter series as Chun-Li
- Height: 157 cm (5 ft 2 in)
- Spouses: Nakatani D. (m. 1998; div. 1999) Takayuki Seki (m. 2004; div. 2016)
- Children: 2

Yūko Miyamura (宮村 優子, Miyamura Yūko; born December 4, 1972), also known by her nickname Miyamū (みやむー), is a Japanese actress, voice actress, singer and sound director. She played Kazuha Toyama in Detective Conan, Casca in Berserk and Asuka Langley Soryu in Neon Genesis Evangelion.

== Personal life ==
Miyamura was born in Kobe, and graduated from the theater division for Toho Gakuen College of Drama and Music. She was diagnosed with Graves' disease and exophthalmos in May 2007. She was initially married to manga artist, Nakatani D. from 1998 to 1999. Miyamura married stuntman Takayuki Seki in 2004. They had two children together, a daughter born in 2004 and a son born in 2011, before they divorced in 2016. The family lived in Melbourne, Australia, until she returned to Japan.

== Career ==
Miyamura released various CD albums as a singer, which feature collaborations with well-known Japanese musicians, such as P-Model vocalist/Berserk series composer Susumu Hirasawa, Yapoos vocalist Jun Togawa and Pizzicato Five producer Yasuharu Konishi. Additionally, she also had a short on-screen role in the movie Battle Royale as the video announcer of the event's rules. She is affiliated with Techno Sound as a sound director and Japan Action Enterprises.

== Filmography ==
=== Television animation ===
List of voice performances in anime
Year	Title	Role	Notes	Source(s)
1994	Brave Police J-Decker	Regina Argine		
1995	The Brave of Gold Goldran	Chris	Episode 5	
1995–96	Wedding Peach	Angel Daisy/Hinagiku Tamano		
1995–96	Juuni Senshi Bakuretsu Eto Ranger	Souffle		
1995	Mojacko	Apple		
1995–96	Neon Genesis Evangelion	Asuka Langley Soryu		
1996–present	Detective Conan	Kazuha Toyama	First appears in Episode 118	
1996	VS Knight Lamune & 40 Fire	Parfait		
1996	Those Who Hunt Elves	Ritsuko Inoue		
1997	Pokémon	Akane/Whitney	Episodes 158–159	
1997	Hyper Police	Natsuki Sasahara		
1997	Clamp School Detectives	Utako Ohkawa		
1997	Those Who Hunt Elves 2	Ritsuko Inoue		
1997	Super Mashin Hero Wataru	Suzume		
1997	Berserk	Casca		
1998	Outlaw Star	Aisha Clanclan		
1998	Neo Ranga	Ushio Shimabara		
1998	Eat-Man '98	Myra Dykstra		
1999	Starship Girl Yamamoto Yohko	Ayano Elizabeth Hakuhōin		
1999–00	Great Teacher Onizuka	Nanako Mizuki	Episode 1	
1999	Colorful	Giant Schoolgirl	Episode 12	
1999–00	We Know You, Moonlight Mask-kun!	Naoto Yamamoto/Gekkou Kamen-kun		
2000	NieA 7	Niea		
2003	Astro Boy: Mighty Atom	Mimi		
2004–05	My-HiME	Alyssa Searrs		
2018	Shinkansen Henkei Robo Shinkalion	Asuka Langley Soryu	Cameo, Episode 31	
2022	Pop Team Epic 2	Pipimi	Episode 9A	

=== Original video animation (OVA) ===
List of voice performances in anime
Year	Title	Role	Notes	Source(s)
1990	Be-Bop High School	Chiharu		
1995	Dirty Pair Flash 2	Joseito B	Episode 2	
1995	Battle Skipper	Shihoko Sasaki		
1996	My Dear Marie	Marie Karigari		
1996	Starship Girl Yamamoto Yohko	Ayano Elizabeth Hakuhōin		
1996	Apocalypse Zero	Megumi		
1996–97	Variable Geo	Satomi Yajima		
1996–97	Adventures of Kotetsu	Linn Suzuki/Kotetsu		
1996–97	Alice in Cyberland ^{(ja)}	Juri Yagami		
1996–97	Wedding Peach DX	Hinagiku Tamano		
1997	Ayane's High Kick	Ayane Mitsui		
1997–98	Night Warriors: Darkstalkers' Revenge (Vampire Hunter)	Lei-Lei		
1997	I Dream of Mimi (Buttobi!! CPU)	Performa Nackintosh		
1998	Queen Emeraldas	Ruda		
1998	Super Mobile Legend Dinagiga ^{(ja)}	Marie Vlaanderen		
1998	Spectral Force	Hiro		
2000	Angel Sanctuary	Kurai		
2002	Detective Conan: 16 Suspects!?	Kazuha Toyama		
2003	Detective Conan: Conan, Heiji, and the Vanished Boy	Kazuha Toyama		
2005	Spectral Force: Chronicle Divergence	Hiro		
2006	Detective Conan: Follow the Vanished Diamond! Conan & Heiji vs. Kid!	Kazuha Toyama		
2009	Detective Conan: The Stranger from Ten Years Later	Kazuha Toyama		
2010	Detective Conan Magic Files: The Osaka Okonomiyaki Odyssey	Kazuha Toyama		

=== Anime films ===
List of voice performances in films
Year	Title	Role	Notes	Source(s)
1997	Neon Genesis Evangelion: Death & Rebirth	Asuka Langley Soryu		
1997	The End of Evangelion	Asuka Langley Soryu		
1997	Rurouni Kenshin: The Motion Picture	Toki Takatsuki		
1998	Welcome to Lodoss Island!	Deedlet		
1998	Gundam Wing: Endless Waltz	Girl A		
1999	Detective Conan: The Last Wizard of the Century	Kazuha Toyama		
2000	A.LI.CE	Yuki		
2003	Detective Conan: Crossroad in the Ancient Capital	Kazuha Toyama		
2006	Detective Conan: The Private Eyes' Requiem	Kazuha Toyama		
2009	Detective Conan: The Raven Chaser	Kazuha Toyama		
2009	Evangelion: 2.0 You Can (Not) Advance	Asuka Langley Shikinami		
2010	Detective Conan: The Lost Ship in the Sky	Kazuha Toyama		
2012	Evangelion: 3.0 You Can (Not) Redo	Asuka Langley Shikinami		
2013	Detective Conan: Private Eye in the Distant Sea	Kazuha Toyama		
2017	Detective Conan: The Crimson Love Letter	Kazuha Toyama		
2021	Evangelion: 3.0+1.0	Asuka Langley Shikinami		

=== Video games ===
List of voice performances in video games
Year	Title	Role	Platform(s)	Notes	Source(s)
1994	Ken Sei Mogura: Street Fighter II	Chun-Li	Arcade		
1994	Travellers! Densetsu o Buttobase	Sophia	TurboGrafx-16 (PC Engine)		
1995	Natsuki Crisis Battle	Rina Takaoka	Super Famicom		
1995	Street Fighter Zero	Chun-Li, Rose	Arcade, CPS Changer, PlayStation, Sega Saturn, Game Boy Color, PC		
1995	Soul Edge	Seong Mi-na	Arcade, PlayStation	PlayStation version	
1996	Street Fighter Zero 2	Chun-Li, Rose	Arcade, PlayStation, Sega Saturn, SNES, PC		
1996	Neon Genesis Evangelion: 1st Impression	Asuka Langley Soryu	Sega Saturn		
1996	Super Puzzle Fighter II X	Chun-Li	Arcade, PlayStation, Sega Saturn, PC, Dreamcast, Game Boy Advance		
1996	Sword & Sorcery	Aya	3DO, Sega Saturn	Sega Saturn Version	
1996	X-Men vs. Street Fighter	Chun-Li	Arcade, Sega Saturn, PlayStation		
1996	Nightruth: Explanation of the Paranormal – Yami no Tobira	Maria Mizunagi	PlayStation		
1996	The Kindaichi Case Files: Hihō Island: The New Tragedy	Miyuki Nanase	Windows, PlayStation		
1996	Street Fighter EX	Chun-Li	Arcade, PlayStation		
1996	Alice in Cyberland ^{(ja)}	Yukari Yagami	PlayStation		
1996	Fire Woman Matoi-gumi ^{(ja)}	Kana Okada	PC-FX		
1997	Neon Genesis Evangelion: Girlfriend of Steel	Asuka Langley Soryu	Windows 95, Mac OS, Sega Saturn, PlayStation, PlayStation 2, PlayStation Portable		
1997	Neon Genesis Evangelion: 2nd Impression	Asuka Langley Soryu	Sega Saturn		
1997	Marika ~The World of Truth~ ^{(ja)}	Marika Kanzaki	Sega Saturn		
1997	Tonari no Princess Rolfee ^{(ja)}	Lion	PC-FX		
1997	My Dream ~On Air ga Matenakute~	Kawai Kurumi	Sega Saturn, PlayStation, Windows		
1997	Voice Fantasia S: Ushinawareta Voice Power	Mary Miin	Sega Saturn, PlayStation		
1997	Marvel Super Heroes vs. Street Fighter	Chun-Li	Arcade, Sega Saturn, PlayStation		
1997	Virus	Mary	Sega Saturn		
1997	Kaito Ranma ^{(ja)}	Mika Hanafusa	Windows		
1997	Pocket Fighter	Chun-Li	Arcade, PlayStation, Sega Saturn, WonderSwan, PlayStation 2		
1997	Super Robot Wars F ^{(ja)}	Grace Urigin, Asuka Langley Soryu	Sega Saturn, PlayStation		
1997	3×3 Eyes Tenrin' ō Genmu	Maria	Windows, PlayStation		
1998	Marvel vs. Capcom: Clash of Super Heroes	Chun-Li, Michelle Heart	Arcade, Dreamcast, PlayStation		
1998	Burning Rangers	Tillis	Sega Saturn		
1998	Yukyu Fantasia 2nd Album	Celine Whitesnow	Sega Saturn, PlayStation		
1998	Anime Freak FX: Vol.6	Yuko Miyamura	PC-FX		
1998	EVE The Lost One ^{(ja)}	Rina Kudo	Sega Saturn		
1998	The Kindaichi Case Files: Hell Park Murder Case	Miyuki Nanase	PlayStation		
1998	Tail Concerto	Alicia Pris	PlayStation		
1998	Super Robot Wars F Final ^{(ja)}	Grace Urigin, Asuka Langley Soryu	Sega Saturn, PlayStation		
1998	Street Fighter EX2	Chun-Li	Arcade, PlayStation		
1998	Street Fighter Zero 3	Chun-Li	Arcade, PlayStation, Dreamcast, Sega Saturn, Game Boy Advance		
1998	B.L.U.E. Legend of Water ^{(ja)}	Maya	PlayStation		
1998	Brave Fencer Musashi	Liquer	PlayStation		
1998	Eva to Yukai na Nakama tachi ^{(ja)}	Asuka Langley Soryu	Sega Saturn, PlayStation, Windows, Game Boy Color		
1998	Black/Matrix	Michette	Sega Saturn, Dreamcast, PlayStation		
1998	Doki Doki Pretty League: Nekketsu Otome Seishunki ^{(ja)}	Arisa Sendo	PlayStation		
1998	The Lost One Last Chapter of Eve ^{(ja)}	Rina Kudo	Windows		
1998	Spectral Force 2	Hiro	PlayStation		
1998	Yukyu Fantasia Ensemble	Celine Whitesnow	Sega Saturn, PlayStation		
1999	Yukyu Fantasia Ensemble 2	Celine Whitesnow	Sega Saturn, PlayStation		
1999	Neon Genesis Evangelion 64	Asuka Langley Soryu	Nintendo 64		
1999	The Kindaichi Case Files: Azure Dragon Legend Murder Case	Miyuki Nanase	PlayStation		
1999	Spectral Force: Itoshiki Ja'aku	Hiro	PlayStation		
1999	Berserk: Chapter of the Lost Flowers of the Millennium	Casca	Dreamcast		
1999	Doki Doki On Air FINAL	Herself	Windows 95/98		
2000	Street Fighter EX3	Chun-Li	PlayStation 2		
2000	Super Robot Wars α ^{(ja)}	Asuka Langley Soryu	PlayStation, Dreamcast		
2000	Yuukyuu Kumikyoku Perpetual Suite -All Star Project-	Celine Whitesnow	PlayStation		
2000	Spectral Force 2: Eternal Miracle	Hiro	Windows		
2000	Marvel vs. Capcom 2: New Age of Heroes	Chun-Li	Arcade, Dreamcast, PlayStation 2, Xbox, PlayStation 3, Xbox 360, iOS		
2001	Neon Genesis Evangelion: Ayanami Raising Project	Asuka Langley Soryu	Windows, Dreamcast		
2003	Drakengard	Fairy	PlayStation 2		
2003	Neon Genesis Evangelion 2	Asuka Langley Soryu	PlayStation 2, PlayStation Portable		
2003	Neon Genesis Evangelion: Ayanami Raising Project with Asuka Complement Project	Asuka Langley Soryu	PlayStation 2, Nintendo DS		
2004	Super Robot Wars MX ^{(ja)}	Asuka Langley Soryu	PlayStation 2, PlayStation Portable		
2004	Spectral Force: Radical Elements	Hiro	PlayStation 2		
2004	Neon Genesis Evangelion: Shinji Ikari Raising Project	Asuka Langley Soryu	Windows		
2004	Berserk – Millennium Empire Arc: Chapter of the Holy Demon War	Casca	PlayStation 2		
2005	Spectral Force Chronicle	Hiro	PlayStation 2		
2005	Neon Genesis Evangelion: Girlfriend of Steel 2nd	Asuka Langley Soryu	Windows, Mac OS (X), PlayStation 2, PlayStation Portable		
2005	3rd Super Robot Wars Alpha: To the End of the Galaxy	Asuka Langley Soryu	PlayStation 2		
2006	Spectral Force 3: Innocent Rage	Culture	Xbox 360		
2006	Secret of Evangelion ^{(ja)}	Asuka Langley Soryu	PlayStation 2, PlayStation Portable, Windows		
2007	Detective Evangelion ^{(ja)}	Asuka Langley Soryu	PlayStation 2		
2007	Kingdom Hearts Re:Chain of Memories	Larxene	PlayStation 2		
2007	Kingdom Hearts II Final Mix	Larxene	PlayStation 2		
2007	Detective Conan: Tsuioku no Mirajiyu	Kazuha Toyama	Wii		
2007	Neon Genesis Evangelion: Battle Orchestra	Asuka Langley Soryu	PlayStation 2, PlayStation Portable		
2007	Baldr Bullet Equilibrium ^{(ja)}	Fai Marinina	PlayStation 2		
2009	Kingdom Hearts 358/2 Days	Larxene	Nintendo DS		
2010	uni. ^{(ja)}	Clarissa von Richthofen	Windows		
2012	Marvel vs. Capcom Origins	Chun-Li	PlayStation 3, Xbox 360		
2013	Kingdom Hearts HD 1.5 Remix	Larxene	PlayStation 3		
2013	Detective Conan: Marionette Symphony	Kazuha Toyama	Nintendo 3DS		
2014	3rd Super Robot Wars Z ^{(ja)}	Asuka Langley Shikinami	PlayStation 3, PlayStation Vita		
2014	Detective Conan: Phantom Rhapsody	Kazuha Toyama	Nintendo 3DS		
2014	Kingdom Hearts HD 2.5 Remix	Larxene	PlayStation 3		
2018	Super Robot Wars V	Asuka Langley Shikinami	PlayStation 4, PlayStation Vita		
2018	Super Robot Wars X-Ω	Asuka Langley Shikinami	Android, iOS		
2019	Kingdom Hearts III	Larxene	PlayStation 4, Xbox One		
2019	Kyoutou Kotoba RPG: Kotodaman	Asuka Langley Shikinami	Android, iOS	Kotodaman × Evangelion collaboration event	
2020	Honkai Impact 3rd	Asuka Langley Shikinami	Android, iOS, Windows	Honkai Impact 3rd × Evangelion collaboration	
2024	Goddess of Victory: Nikke	Asuka Langley Shikinami	Android, iOS		

=== Dubbing ===
Year	Title	Role	Original Performer	Notes	Source
2001	Ginger Snaps	Ginger Fitzgerald	Katharine Isabelle		
2002	Volcano High	So Yo-seon	Gong Hyo-jin		
2020	Rebecca	Mrs. Danvers	Judith Anderson	New Era Movies edition	

=== Live-action ===
Year	Title	Role	Notes	Source
2000	Battle Royale	Training video announcer		
2001	EAT&RUN ^{(ja)}	Yuko		
2003	The End of Evangelion: Renewal	Asuka Langley Soryu	Previously unreleased 11-minute live-action sequence included in the Renewal of Evangelion box set	

=== Television programs ===
- Pa-Pa-Pa-Pa-Puffy (narration)
- Kyuukyuu Sentai GoGoFive (Kyoko Hayase, Infant Demon Drop)
- Ninpuu Sentai Hurricanger Shushutto the Movie (Knuckle)
- Samurai Sentai Shinkenger (Guest)

=== As Sound Director ===
- LOVELESS
- Cherry Magic! Thirty Years of Virginity Can Make You a Wizard?!

== Discography ==
=== Solo ===
Solo Albums
Release date	Title	Album information
June 21, 1996	Kenka Banchō ^{(ja)} (ケンカ番長)	Label: Victor Entertainment; Catalog No.: VICL-758; Type: Album
December 18, 1996	Supēsu Kenka Banchō ^{(ja)} (スペースケンカ番長)	Label: Victor Entertainment; Catalog No.: VICL-23118; Type: Mini Album
November 22, 1997	Fuichi ^{(ja)} (不意打ち)	Label: Victor Entertainment; Catalog No.: VICL-60090; Type: Album
March 25, 1998	Tamashī ^{(ja)} (魂)	Label: Victor Entertainment; Catalog No.: VICL-60182; Type: Mini Album
July 23, 1998	Sankyū ~Thank You~ ^{(ja)} (産休〜Thank You〜)	Label: Victor Entertainment; Catalog No.: VICL-60261 (VIZL-33); Type: Album (Limited Edition)
December 2, 1998	Mecha Best ^{(ja)} (めっちゃベスト)	Label: Victor Entertainment; Catalog No.: VICL-60319; Type: Best Of
May 21, 1999	Uguisu Jou ^{(ja)} (鶯嬢)	Label: Victor Entertainment; Catalog No.: VICL-60380; Type: Mini Album
August 25, 1999	Dai Suu Shī ^{(ja)} (大四喜)	Label: Victor Entertainment; Catalog No.: VICL-60445; Type: Album
December 1, 1999	Hobo Single Best ^{(ja)} (ほぼシングルベスト)	Label: Victor Entertainment; Catalog No.: VICL-60502; Type: Best Of

Solo Singles
Release date	Title	Album information
July 21, 1995	Koi wo Surunara (恋をするなら)	Label: Victor Entertainment; Catalog No.: VIDL-10679
May 22, 1996	ENDLESS PARTY/HELLO,STRANGE DAYS	Label: Victor Entertainment; Catalog No.: VIDL-10760
November 21, 1996	Kurumi Pan/Son'na KISS ja Yurusanai (くるみパン/そんなKISSじゃ許さない)	Label: Victor Entertainment; Catalog No.: VIDL-10828
March 5, 1997	Konjou Sentai Guts-man (根性戦隊ガッツマン)	Label: Victor Entertainment; Catalog No.: VIDL-10848
May 21, 1997	Heisei Ijinden (平成偉人伝)	Label: Victor Entertainment; Catalog No.: VIDL-30019
August 21, 1997	KANON	Label: Victor Entertainment; Catalog No.: VIDL-30053
November 6, 1997	Pi・Pi・Pi/Machi ya Mori ya Tsuki he (Pi・Pi・Pi/街や森や月へ)	Label: Victor Entertainment; Catalog No.: VIDL-30076
February 21, 1998	Mother	Label: Victor Entertainment; Catalog No.: VIDL-30182
May 21, 1998	Koi to Yokubou (恋と欲望)	Label: Victor Entertainment; Catalog No.: VIDL-30219
June 24, 1998	Arigato (アリガト)	Label: Victor Entertainment; Catalog No.: VICL-35030
September 23, 1998	Oho Chinchin / Oppai ga Ippai / Slave & Queen (オー・チンチン/おっぱいがいっぱい/SLAVE&QUEEN)	Label: Victor Entertainment; Catalog No.: VIDL-30357
July 23, 1999	Meitantei ha Jinsei wo Kotaezu (名探偵は人生を答えず)	Label: Victor Entertainment; Catalog No.: VIDL-30434
July 23, 1999	Growin' Up!	Label: Victor Entertainment; Catalog No.: VIDL-30435
January 11, 2012	Kokoro yo genshi ni modore ~2012 Version~ (心よ原始に戻れ〜2012 version〜)	Label: Starchild Records; Catalog No.: KICM-1343
September 1, 2022	Moon Reverie (月、想ふ時)	feat. Yuuhei Satellite; for the mobile game Touhou LostWord

=== In Seiyuu Groups ===
==== Furil ====
- 1995: Yumemiru Ai Tenshi / FURIL [KIDA-106]
- 1995: Wedding Peach MUSIC BOUQUET 1 [KICA-256]
- 1995: Wedding Peach MUSIC BOUQUET 2 [KICA-269]
- 1995: Wedding Peach FURIL [KICA-249]
- 1995: Wedding Peach Dream Collection [JSCA-29034]
