= Kawauso =

Kawauso (Japanese, 'river otter') may refer to:

- Otters in Japanese folklore
- Kawauso, a fictional character in the manga series Utsurun Desu
