= List of Yu Yu Hakusho video games =

The logo of the Yu Yu Hakusho video games released by Atari

There are numerous video games based on the YuYu Hakusho manga and anime series created by Yoshihiro Togashi. The Japanese name of the series is romanized as Yū Yū Hakusho and the anime is officially titled Yu Yu Hakusho in North America. The games primarily revolve around the protagonist Yusuke Urameshi, a delinquent junior high school student who is killed while trying to save a young boy from being hit by a car. Yusuke is brought back to life and is promptly given the task of solving cases involving ghosts and demons in the human world.

There are a total of twenty-one video games based solely on YuYu Hakusho, most of have only been released in Japan. When the anime series aired on Fuji TV in the early 1990s, games were released on both home and handheld consoles. These include a group by Tomy on the Nintendo Game Boy, a group by Namco on the Super Famicom, releases on Sega consoles, and a few miscellaneous platform titles. In May 2003, following the show's western debut, Atari acquired the rights to distribute new YuYu Hakusho games in North America and PAL regions. The company published three games exclusive to those locations. More Japan-exclusive games have since been released by Banpresto and Takara Tomy. Games in the series are of several different genres, though many are action or fighting-themed in relation to the manga's story arcs.

Video games in the YuYu Hakusho franchise have achieved some commercial success. By December 2003, video games in the series had accrued $273 million in life-to-date retail sales. Atari reported adequate fiscal contributions from its releases in North America. Yū Yū Hakusho Forever for the PlayStation 2 also saw initial success on Japanese sales charts. However, games in the franchise that have been released since 2003 have received mostly poor to average reviews from critics.

== Video games ==
=== 1990s ===
Game	Details
Yū Yū Hakusho Original release date(s): JP: August 23, 1993	Release years by system: 1993 — Game Boy
Yū Yū Hakusho Original release date(s): JP: August 23, 1993	Notes: Published by Tomy.
Yū Yū Hakusho Yamishōbu! Ankoku Bujutsu Kai Original release date(s): JP: September 30, 1993	Release years by system: 1993 — PC Engine
Yū Yū Hakusho Yamishōbu! Ankoku Bujutsu Kai Original release date(s): JP: September 30, 1993	Notes: Published and developed by Banpresto.; A scrolling shooter.
Yū Yū Hakusho: Bakutō Ankoku Bujutsu Kai Original release date(s): JP: October 22, 1993	Release years by system: 1993 — Datach Joint ROM System
Yū Yū Hakusho: Bakutō Ankoku Bujutsu Kai Original release date(s): JP: October 22, 1993	Notes: Published by Bandai, developed by Tose.
Yū Yū Hakusho Dai-Ni-Dan: Ankoku Bujutsu Kai Hen Original release date(s): JP: December 10, 1993	Release years by system: 1993 — Game Boy
Yū Yū Hakusho Dai-Ni-Dan: Ankoku Bujutsu Kai Hen Original release date(s): JP: December 10, 1993	Notes: Published by Tomy.
Yū Yū Hakusho Original release date(s): JP: December 22, 1993	Release years by system: 1993 — Super Famicom
Yū Yū Hakusho Original release date(s): JP: December 22, 1993	Notes: Published and developed by Namco
Yū Yū Hakusho Gaiden Original release date(s): JP: January 28, 1994	Release years by system: 1994 — Mega Drive
Yū Yū Hakusho Gaiden Original release date(s): JP: January 28, 1994	Notes: Published by Sega, developed by Gau Entertainment.; A role-playing video game.
Yū Yū Hakusho: Horobishi Mono no Gyakushū Original release date(s): JP: March 25, 1994	Release years by system: 1994 — Game Gear
Yū Yū Hakusho: Horobishi Mono no Gyakushū Original release date(s): JP: March 25, 1994	Notes: Published and developed by Sega.; A beat 'em up.
Yū Yū Hakusho Dai-San-Dan: Makai no Tobira Original release date(s): JP: June 3, 1994	Release years by system: 1994 — Game Boy
Yū Yū Hakusho Dai-San-Dan: Makai no Tobira Original release date(s): JP: June 3, 1994	Notes: Published by Tomy.
Yū Yū Hakusho 2: Kakutō no Sho Original release date(s): JP: June 10, 1994	Release years by system: 1994 — Super Famicom
Yū Yū Hakusho 2: Kakutō no Sho Original release date(s): JP: June 10, 1994	Notes: Published by Namco.; A fighting game.
Yū Yū Hakusho: Makyō Tōitsusen Original release date(s): JP: September 30, 1994; BRA: 1999	Release years by system: 1994 — Mega Drive
Yū Yū Hakusho: Makyō Tōitsusen Original release date(s): JP: September 30, 1994; BRA: 1999	Notes: Developed by Treasure and published by Sega.; Released in Brazil by Tectoy under the title Yu Yu Hakusho: Sunset Fighters.; A fighting game with 11 playable characters for up to four people simultaneously.
Yū Yū Hakusho II: Gekitou! Shichi Kyō no Tatakai Original release date(s): JP: September 30, 1994	Release years by system: 1994 — Game Gear
Yū Yū Hakusho II: Gekitou! Shichi Kyō no Tatakai Original release date(s): JP: September 30, 1994	Notes: Published and developed by Sega.
Yū Yū Hakusho Dai-Yon-Dan: Makai Tōitsu Hen Original release date(s): JP: December 9, 1994	Release years by system: 1994 — Game Boy
Yū Yū Hakusho Dai-Yon-Dan: Makai Tōitsu Hen Original release date(s): JP: December 9, 1994	Notes: Published by Tomy.
Yū Yū Hakusho: Tokubetsu-hen Original release date(s): JP: December 22, 1994	Release years by system: 1994 — Super Famicom
Yū Yū Hakusho: Tokubetsu-hen Original release date(s): JP: December 22, 1994	Notes: Published and developed by Namco.
Yū Yū Hakusho Original release date(s): JP: December 23, 1994	Release years by system: 1994 — 3DO
Yū Yū Hakusho Original release date(s): JP: December 23, 1994	Notes: Published by Tomy, developed by Hudson Soft.
Yū Yū Hakusho Final: Makai Saikyō Retsuden Original release date(s): JP: March 24, 1995	Release years by system: 1995 — Super Famicom
Yū Yū Hakusho Final: Makai Saikyō Retsuden Original release date(s): JP: March 24, 1995	Notes: Published and developed by Namco.; A fighting game with 13 playable characters.

=== 2000s ===
Game	Details
Yu Yu Hakusho: Spirit Detective Original release date(s): NA: December 2, 2003; PAL: April 1, 2005	Release years by system: 2003 — Game Boy Advance
Yu Yu Hakusho: Spirit Detective Original release date(s): NA: December 2, 2003; PAL: April 1, 2005	Notes: Published by Atari, developed by Sensory Sweep Studios and Screaming Games.; Features six playable characters and over 20 levels of gameplay.; Later released in a double pack with Dragon Ball Z: Taiketsu.
Yu Yu Hakusho: Dark Tournament Original release date(s): NA: September 21, 2004; PAL: July 15, 2005	Release years by system: 2004 — PlayStation 2
Yu Yu Hakusho: Dark Tournament Original release date(s): NA: September 21, 2004; PAL: July 15, 2005	Notes: Published by Atari, developed by Digital Fiction.; A 3D fighting game with 25 playable characters.
Yu Yu Hakusho: Tournament Tactics Original release date(s): NA: November 18, 2004; PAL: February 25, 2005	Release years by system: 2004 — Game Boy Advance
Yu Yu Hakusho: Tournament Tactics Original release date(s): NA: November 18, 2004; PAL: February 25, 2005	Notes: Published by Atari, developed by Sensory Sweep Studios and Screaming Games.; A tactical role-playing game.
Yū Yū Hakusho Forever Original release date(s): JP: May 19, 2005	Release years by system: 2005 — PlayStation 2
Yū Yū Hakusho Forever Original release date(s): JP: May 19, 2005	Notes: Published by Banpresto, developed by Dimps and Matrix Software.; A 3D fighting game.; Re-released as part of the PlayStation the Best range on July 6, 2006.
Yū Yū Hakusho DS: Ankoku Bujutsu Kai Hen Original release date(s): JP: September 21, 2006	Release years by system: 2006 — Nintendo DS
Yū Yū Hakusho DS: Ankoku Bujutsu Kai Hen Original release date(s): JP: September 21, 2006	Notes: Published and developed by Takara Tomy.; An action role-playing game
The Battle of Yū Yū Hakusho: Shitō! Ankoku Bujutsu Kai Original release date(s): JP: September 2006 (Arcade); JP: January 11, 2007 (PlayStation 2)	Release years by system: 2006 — Arcade; 2007 — PlayStation 2
The Battle of Yū Yū Hakusho: Shitō! Ankoku Bujutsu Kai Original release date(s): JP: September 2006 (Arcade); JP: January 11, 2007 (PlayStation 2)	Notes: Published by Banpresto, developed by Dimps.; A 3D fighting video game.; Ported to the PlayStation 2 as The Battle of Yū Yū Hakusho: Shitou! Ankoku Bujutsu Kai 120% Full Power.

=== 2010s ===
Game	Details
Yu Yu Hakusho: 100% Maji Battle Original release date(s): WW: August 28, 2018	Release years by system: 2018 — Android, iOS
Yu Yu Hakusho: 100% Maji Battle Original release date(s): WW: August 28, 2018	Notes: Published by KLab, developed by AXEL GameStudio.; A free to play RPG game.

=== Other games ===
Game	Details
Jump Super Stars Original release date(s): JP: August 10, 2005	Release years by system: 2005 – Nintendo DS
Jump Super Stars Original release date(s): JP: August 10, 2005	Notes: Published by Nintendo, developed by Nintendo and Ganbarion.; Features one stage and four characters from the YuYu Hakusho series (one of them playable).
Jump Ultimate Stars Original release date(s): JP: November 23, 2006	Release years by system: 2006 – Nintendo DS
Jump Ultimate Stars Original release date(s): JP: November 23, 2006	Notes: Published by Nintendo, developed by Nintendo and Ganbarion.; Features one stage and six characters from the YuYu Hakusho series (three of them playable).
J-Stars Victory VS Original release date(s): JP: March 19, 2014; NA: June 30, 2015; EU: June 26, 2015	Release years by system: 2014 – PlayStation 3/PlayStation Vita
J-Stars Victory VS Original release date(s): JP: March 19, 2014; NA: June 30, 2015; EU: June 26, 2015	Notes: Published by Bandai Namco Games, developed by Spike Chunsoft.; Features one stage and three playable characters from the YuYu Hakusho series.
Jump Force Original release date(s): JP: February 14, 2019; WW: February 15, 2019	Release years by system: 2019 – PlayStation 4
Jump Force Original release date(s): JP: February 14, 2019; WW: February 15, 2019	Notes: Published by Bandai Namco Entertainment, developed by Spike Chunsoft.; Features three playable characters from the YuYu Hakusho series.
