= Utsurun Desu: Kawauso Hawaii e Iku!!! =

1992 video game

Utsurun Desu: Kawauso Hawaii e iku
- Cover art
- Developer: Takara
- Publisher: Takara-Shogakukan Productions Co., Ltd.
- Designer: Manga: Sensya Yoshida
- Programmer: Joji Hirayama
- Platform: Famicom
- Release: JP: March 6, 1992
- Genre: Platformer
- Mode: Single-player

Utsurun Desu: Kawauso Hawaii e Iku!!! (伝染るんです。 かわうそハワイへ行く; Utsurun Desu - Kawauso moves to Hawaii) is a video game for the Nintendo Famicom based on the popular Japanese manga character from the 1980s "the otter man", Kawauso-kun from Sensya Yoshida's series Uturun Desu. The game was published in 1992 by Takara.

== Summary ==
Traversing the pit of spikes.

While ostensibly a traditional platform game in which the player controls Kawauso-kun, the game has gained renown for being one of the earliest titles to attempt to break away from the video game conventions of the time. Among other convention-flouting novelties that the game offers are a series of fake title screens that the player must pass through at the start, and the allowance of the main character to traverse the background at times to bypass pits of spikes that otherwise appear impossible to cross.

In addition, the character's attack requires the player to hold down the attack button as the game cycles through the possible special moves with the more powerful attacks only highlighted for a short period of time.

== Reception ==
Kurt Kalata reviewed the game as part of Hardcore Gamer 101's "Your Weekly Kusoge" (No. 9), describing it as "an inane platformer with no real effort placed into the actual design." Kalata specifically highlighted the poor playability and gameplay dynamics, but he also noted that it is humorous and clever.

== See also ==
- List of video games based on anime or manga
