= Pa-Pa-Pa-Pa-Puffy =

Japanese television series

- Written by: Sotani; Kundō Koyama; Hiromi Machiyama
- Directed by: Hiroaki Ito
- Presented by: Ami Onuki; Yumi Yoshimura
- Narrated by: Yūko Miyamura; Fumie Kusachi; Keiichi Sonobe
- Theme music composer: Puffy
- Composer: Puffy
- Country of origin: Japan
- Original language: Japanese

Production
- Producer: Takao Yamamoto
- Running time: 30 mins (1997–2000); 45 mins (2000–2002)
- Production company: TV Asahi

Original release
- Release: October 1, 1997 – March 31, 2002

Pa Pa Pa Pa Puffy (also known as Pa-Pa-Pa-Pa Puffy, パパパパパフィー) is a variety TV show which aired in Japan (TV Asahi) from 1 October 1997 to 27 March 2002, and re-aired as a PUFFY 10th anniversary broadcast for a short time in 2006. It was hosted by Ami Onuki and Yumi Yoshimura. Rodney Alan Greenblat was responsible for most of the visual design of the show.

Pa-Pa-Pa-Pa-Puffy featured guests such as Lenny Kravitz, Sylvester Stallone, Harrison Ford, Aerosmith, and rock band Garbage.

== Main cast ==
- Ami Onuki
- Yumi Yoshimura

The Puppets

- Muffy, a yellow squirrel who narrates some segments of the show.
- Little Lemon, a lemon like puppet creature with a high-pitched voice.
- Very Shy Mouse, a gray shy mouse that does not say much.
- Captain Catfish, a catfish who speaks in a very gruff voice.
- Cosmo, a parrot who is little known about.

== Semi-Regulars ==
Men

- Yo Oizumi
- Pierre Taki

Women

- Nanase Aikawa
- Miho Kanno
- Tomoe Shinohara
