= Natsuki Crisis Battle =

1995 video game

- Developer: Tose
- Publisher: Angel
- Composers: Sabakuma Yuki; Tomo Chan; AKP
- Platform: Super Famicom
- Release: JP: April 21, 1995
- Genre: 2D action fighting
- Modes: Single-player; Multiplayer

Natsuki Crisis Battle (なつきクライシスバトル) is a 1995 video game that was released exclusively for the Japanese Super Famicom. Based on the two-episode OVA and manga Natsuki Crisis, which was written by Hiroshi Tsuruta and serialized in the magazine Business Jump, the player can choose from eight characters and fight on locations such as inside a budō gym, outside a high school and other locations.

== Characters and voice actors ==
- Natsuki Kisumi (Voiced by Ai Orikasa): The heroine, who fights in a red gi. In the story mode, she must fight several opponents in her school uniform.
- Rina Takaoka (Voiced by Yūko Miyamura): Natsuki's rival and friend. Despite her diminutive size, she is gifted amateur wrestler. She uses a "cat-as-catch can" wrestling style.
- Akira Kandori (Voiced by Mari Mashiba): A powerfully built female opponent with short hair. Another wrestler, like Rina.
- Masaaki Yanagisawa (Voiced by Nobuyuki Furuta): The karateka team captain at Natsuki and Rina's school. Superhumanly strong.
- Naoya Hondō (Voiced by Nobuo Tobita): A flirtatious pretty boy at Natsuki's school. The first opponent of the Story mode.
- Endo (Voiced by Tōru Furusawa)
- Bigaro Nabeshima (Voiced by Naoki Makishima)
- Tsuguo Nabeshima (Voiced by Ken Narita)

== Reception ==
On release, Famicom Tsūshin scored the game a 21 out of 40.

== See also ==
- List of video games based on anime or manga
