= Neon Genesis Evangelion: Battle Orchestra =

2007 video game

- Developer: Gainax
- Publisher: BROCCOLI
- Platforms: PlayStation 2, PlayStation Portable
- Release: PlayStation 2: JP: June 28, 2007; PlayStation Portable: JP: July 30, 2009
- Genres: Action-adventure, Anime
- Modes: Single player, Multiplayer

Neon Genesis Evangelion: Battle Orchestra (新世紀エヴァンゲリオン バトルオーケストラ, Shinseiki Evangerion Batoru Ōkesutora) is a fighting video game produced by BROCCOLI. The game features Eva units and Angels from Neon Genesis Evangelion battling each other. The game is a platform fighter with fully 3D rendered backgrounds and environments. The Story Mode features individual arcs for Asuka Langley Soryu, Shinji Ikari, Tōji Suzuhara, Kensuke Aida, Rei Ayanami and Kaworu Nagisa. Every playable unit can also do two special attacks that unleashes a devastating attack.

== Playable Units ==
Evangelion Units	Angels	Other units
Unit 00; Unit 01; Unit 02; Unit 03; Unit 04; Mass-Produced Evangelion; Evangelion Alpha; Evangelion Beta; Evangelion Unit 00 (Rebuild of Evangelion version)^{†}; Evangelion Unit 01 (Rebuild of Evangelion version)^{†}	Lilith^{†}; Sachiel; Shamshel; Ramiel; Gaghiel; Israfel; Sandalphon (non-playable, used as an environmental hazard); Sahaquiel; Leliel; Zeruel; Bardiel	Jet Alone; Gunbuster

^†: denotes characters exclusive to the PSP release)

== Reception ==
The PlayStation Portable version of the game sold 7,082 copies the week of its release.
