= Utsurun Desu =

Japanese manga series

- First tankōbon volume cover, featuring Kawauso

伝染るんです。
- Genre: Nonsensical comedy
- Manga
- Written by: Sensha Yoshida
- Published by: Shogakukan
- Magazine: Big Comic Spirits
- Original run: 1989 – 1994
- Volumes: 5
- Original video animation
- Directed by: Mankyū
- Studio: DLE
- Released: August 21, 2009 – October 23, 2009
- Episodes: 3
- icon

Utsurun Desu (Note: Utsurun Desu roughly means "It's contagious" and is a homophone for a brand name of disposable cameras produced by Fujifilm (where Utsurun desu (写ルンです) means "it takes pictures"), sold as QuickSnap outside Japan.) (伝染るんです。) is a Japanese manga series written and illustrated by Sensha Yoshida. It was serialized in Shogakukan's seinen manga magazine Big Comic Spirits from 1989 to 1994, with its chapters collected in five tankōbon volumes.

A video game, titled Utsurun Desu: Kawauso Hawaii e Iku!!!, was released in 1992. A three-episode original video animation (OVA), produced by DLE, was released in 2009. A series of 50-episode live-action shorts was released in that same year.

The manga has had over 3 million copies in circulation. It won the 37th Bungeishunjū Manga Award in 1991. It is regarded as one of the pioneers of the absurd gag manga.

== Characters ==
Kawauso (かわうそ)
Voiced by: Chafurin
Kappa (かっぱ)
Voiced by: Mamiko Noto
Professor Yamazaki (山崎先生, Yamazaki Sensei)
Voiced by: Tomokazu Seki
Mitchie (ミッチー, Mitchī)
Voiced by: Mai Nakahara
Shiitake (しいたけ)
Voiced by: Raikō Sakamoto
Tami Inuyama (犬山 タミ, Inuyama Tami)
Voiced by: Norio Wakamoto
Kawanuma (川沼)
Voiced by: Yukitoshi Tokumoto

== Media ==
=== Manga ===
Written and illustrated by Sensha Yoshida, Utsurun Desu was serialized in Shogakukan's seinen manga magazine Big Comic Spirits from 1989 to 1994. Shogakukan collected its chapters in five tankōbon volumes, released from November 1990 to August 1994.

A special chapter was published in Big Comic Spirits on November 12, 2012, as part of the "Heroes Come Back" anthology, which comprised short stories by manga artists to raise funds for recovery of the areas afflicted by the 2011 Tōhoku earthquake and tsunami. A four-panel manga, titled Kawauso Seven (かわうそセブン), started in the Tokyo Shimbun newspaper on April 3, 2021. It changed to online publication on the newspaper's website on July 8, 2022.

=== Video game ===
A video game, titled Utsurun Desu: Kawauso Hawaii e Iku!!! (伝染るんです。 かわうそハワイへ行く), published by Takara, was released for the Nintendo Famicom on March 6, 1992.

=== Original video animation ===
A three-episode original video animation (OVA), produced by DLE, was released on DVD from August 21 to October 23, 2009.

=== Live-action shorts ===
A 50-episode live-action series, consisting of one-minute short episodes, was released on the BeeTV mobile phone television service starting on October 6, 2009.

== Reception ==
The manga has had over 3 million copies in circulation. In 1991, the series won the 37th Bungeishunjū Manga Award. It is regarded as one of the pioneers of the absurd gag manga.
