= Yū Yū Hakusho (1994 video game) =

- Developers: Hudson Soft, Tose
- Publisher: Tomy
- Series: Yu Yu Hakusho
- Platform: 3DO
- Release: JP: 23 December 1994
- Genre: Fighting
- Modes: Single-player, multiplayer

Yū Yū Hakusho (Note: Japanese: 幽☆遊☆白書) is a 1994 fighting video game developed and published by Tomy for the 3DO platform, based on the YuYu Hakusho anime.

== Gameplay ==
Gameplay screenshot.

The player can choose from 15 characters, each of which has their own special and hyper moves.

Modes include Scenario Mode, where the player watched an FMV from the anime in-between fights; a five-player Team Battle; a Practice mode, as well as an Art Gallery mode to view artworks of the anime.

== Development and release ==
Yū Yū Hakusho was co-developed by Hudson Soft and Tose. The game was produced in cooperation with Pierrot (the company behind the anime adaptation) and borrows clips from the series to use in its cutscenes. The sprites were digitizations of animation cels from the studio. The game was published by Tomy for the 3DO exclusively in Japan on December 23, 1994.

== Reception ==
Reception

Review scores
Publication	Score
Next Generation	1/5
Player One	79%
Super GamePower	3.2/5.0
Última Generación	56/100

Critical reception for Yū Yū Hakusho has been mixed. Hugo Provost of Hardcore Gaming 101 summarized Yū Yū Hakusho as "an interesting failure." He stated that the combination of poor quality character sprites, a low number of animation frames, and zooming during battles "results in an ugly yet striking look that is somewhere between authentic anime and cheap mess." Provost found that this roughness extended to the gameplay where many attacks lack the range to be useful and projectiles lack the speed to hit their targets. Gonzalo Herrero of the Spanish magazine Última Generación expressed a similar opinion regarding its graphics and gameplay. The writer did label the animated cutscenes as a "visual marvel" but stated that they were little more than manga with accompanying music. Next Generation panned the game's digitized sprites as "murky and flat" and its moves as ranging from "run-of-the-mill to boring." The magazine ultimately implored potential players to "avoid this one at all costs."

Nicholas Des Barres (Nick Rox) of GameFan was highly positive to the game, praising the art gallery, the graphics and music, and concluded that Yū Yū Hakusho is an "excellent, well-rounded fighting game". Christophe Delpierre of the French magazine Player One felt that while Yū Yū Hakusho could not be considered "fighting game of the year" that it still has "undeniable qualities" in its atmosphere, aesthetic, and gameplay despite its limited attacks. Rafael Gonzalez of Micromanía considered it a unique yet very attractive approach to the fighting genre. The Spanish magazine GamesTech likewise briefly commended its animated cutscenes and visuals in a retrospective. Marcelo Kamikaze of the Brazilian magazine Super GamePower commented that the simplified attack inputs fit well with its gameplay, but that the game's sound design belittled the 3DO console's power.
