= List of Case Closed video games =

There are several video games based on the manga and anime series Case Closed, also known as Meitantei Conan (名探偵コナン, lit. Great Detective Conan, officially translated as Detective Conan) by Gosho Aoyama. The games primarily revolve around Jimmy Kudo along with his friends as they solve murders in an episodic fashion to a whodunit fashion. The games have been released on home and handheld game consoles. The series are usually Graphic adventure games.

The first game to be released from the Case Closed series was Meitantei Conan: Chika Yuuenchi Satsujin Jiken, which debuted on December 27, 1996, and the latest release being Meitantei Konan: Fantomu Kyōshikyoku (Rapusodī), which was released on April 17, 2014. In total, there are 24 games holding the Case Closed title. All but one of the games have been released only in Japan. Nobilis has localized Case Closed: The Mirapolis Investigation for the PAL region.

== Games ==
=== Handheld console ===
Game	Details
Meitantei Conan: Chika Yuuenchi Satsujin Jiken Original release date(s): JP: December 27, 1996	Release years by system: 1996 – Game Boy
Meitantei Conan: Chika Yuuenchi Satsujin Jiken Original release date(s): JP: December 27, 1996	Notes: Meitantei Conan: Chika Yuuenchi Satsujin Jiken (名探偵コナン 地下遊園地殺人事件, lit. Detective Conan: The Underground Amusement Park Murder Case) is developed by Bandai.
Meitantei Conan: Giwaku no Gouka Ressha Original release date(s): JP: August 7, 1998	Release years by system: 1998 – Game Boy
Meitantei Conan: Giwaku no Gouka Ressha Original release date(s): JP: August 7, 1998	Notes: Meitantei Conan: Giwaku no Gouka Ressha (名探偵コナン 疑惑の豪華列車, lit. Detective Conan: The Suspicious Gorgeous Train) is developed by Bandai.
Meitantei Conan: Majutsushi no Chousenjou! Original release date(s): JP: August 5, 1999	Release years by system: 1999 – WonderSwan
Meitantei Conan: Majutsushi no Chousenjou! Original release date(s): JP: August 5, 1999	Notes: Meitantei Conan: Majutsushi no Chousenjou! (名探偵コナン 魔術師の挑戦状!, lit. Detective Conan: The Magician's Challenge Letter!) is developed by Bandai.
Meitantei Conan: Karakuri Jiin Satsujin Jiken Original release date(s): JP: February 25, 2000	Release years by system: 2000 – Game Boy Color
Meitantei Conan: Karakuri Jiin Satsujin Jiken Original release date(s): JP: February 25, 2000	Notes: Meitantei Conan: Karakuri Jiin Satsujin Jiken (名探偵コナン からくり寺院殺人事件, lit. Detective Conan: The Mechanical Temple Murder Case) is developed by Banpresto.
Meitantei Conan: Kiganshima Hihou Densetsu Original release date(s): JP: March 31, 2000	Release years by system: 2000 – Game Boy Color
Meitantei Conan: Kiganshima Hihou Densetsu Original release date(s): JP: March 31, 2000	Notes: Meitantei Conan: Kiganshima Hihou Densetsu (名探偵コナン 奇岩島秘宝伝説, lit. Detective Conan: Legend of the Strange Rock Island Treasure) is developed by Banpresto.
Meitantei Conan: Nishi no Meitantei, Saidai no Kiki!? Original release date(s): JP: July 27, 2000	Release years by system: 2000 – WonderSwan
Meitantei Conan: Nishi no Meitantei, Saidai no Kiki!? Original release date(s): JP: July 27, 2000	Notes: Meitantei Conan: Nishi no Meitantei, Saidai no Kiki!? (名探偵コナン 西の名探偵 最大の危機!?, lit. Detective Conan: The Western Detective's Greatest Crisis!?) is developed by Bandai.
Meitantei Conan: Yuugure no Oujo Original release date(s): JP: April 5, 2001	Release years by system: 2001 – WonderSwan Color
Meitantei Conan: Yuugure no Oujo Original release date(s): JP: April 5, 2001	Notes: Meitantei Conan: Yuugure no Oujo (夕暮れの皇女, lit. Detective Conan: Twilight Princess) is developed by Bandai.
Meitantei Conan: Norowareta Kouro Original release date(s): JP: June 1, 2001	Release years by system: 2001 – Game Boy Color
Meitantei Conan: Norowareta Kouro Original release date(s): JP: June 1, 2001	Notes: Meitantei Conan: Norowareta Kouro (名探偵コナン 呪われた航路, lit. Detective Conan: The Cursed Sea Route) is developed by Banpresto.
Meitantei Conan: Neraiwareta Tantei Original release date(s): JP: July 25, 2003	Release years by system: 2003 – Game Boy Advance
Meitantei Conan: Neraiwareta Tantei Original release date(s): JP: July 25, 2003	Notes: Meitantei Conan: Neraiwareta Tantei (名探偵コナン 狙われた探偵, lit. Detective Conan: The Targeted Detective) is developed by Banpresto.
Meitantei Conan: Akatsuki no Monument Original release date(s): JP: April 21, 2005	Release years by system: 2005 – Game Boy Advance
Meitantei Conan: Akatsuki no Monument Original release date(s): JP: April 21, 2005	Notes: Meitantei Conan: Akatsuki no Monument (名探偵コナン 暁のモニュメント, lit. Detective Conan: Monument's Sunrise) is developed by Banpresto.
Meitantei Conan: Tantei Ryoku Trainer Original release date(s): JP: April 3, 2007	Release years by system: 2007 – Nintendo DS
Meitantei Conan: Tantei Ryoku Trainer Original release date(s): JP: April 3, 2007	Notes: Meitantei Conan: Tantei Ryoku Trainer (名探偵コナン 探偵力トレーナー, lit. Detective Conan: Detective Skill Trainer) is developed by Bandai.
Meitantei Conan: Kieta Hakase to Machigai Sagashi no Tou Original release date(s): JP: April 3, 2008	Release years by system: 2008 – Nintendo DS
Meitantei Conan: Kieta Hakase to Machigai Sagashi no Tou Original release date(s): JP: April 3, 2008	Notes: Meitantei Conan: Kieta Hakase to Machigai Sagashi no Tou (名探偵コナン 消えた博士とまちがいさがしの塔, lit. Detective Conan: The Missing Professor and the Mistaken Tower Search) is developed by Bandai.
Meitantei Conan & Kindaichi Shounen no Jikenbou: Meguri au 2-Jin no Meitantei Original release date(s): JP: February 3, 2009	Release years by system: 2009 – Nintendo DS
Meitantei Conan & Kindaichi Shounen no Jikenbou: Meguri au 2-Jin no Meitantei Original release date(s): JP: February 3, 2009	Notes: Meitantei Conan & Kindaichi Shounen no Jikenbou: Meguri au 2-Jin no Meitantei (名探偵コナン&金田一少年の事件簿 めぐりあう2人の名探偵, lit. Detective Conan & Kindaichi Case Files: Chance Meeting of Two Great Detectives) is developed by Bandai.; A crossover with the Kindaichi Case Files series.
Meitantei Conan: Aoki houseki no Rinbu Rondo Original release date(s): JP: April 21, 2011	Release years by system: 2011 – Nintendo DS
Meitantei Conan: Aoki houseki no Rinbu Rondo Original release date(s): JP: April 21, 2011	Notes: Meitantei Conan: Aoki houseki no Rinbu Rondo (名探偵コナン 蒼き宝石の輪舞曲, lit. Detective Conan: The Blue Jewel's Rondo) is developed by Bandai.
Meitantei Conan: Kako Kara no Zensōkyoku Prelude Original release date(s): JP: April 19, 2012	Release years by system: 2012 – Nintendo DS, PSP
Meitantei Conan: Kako Kara no Zensōkyoku Prelude Original release date(s): JP: April 19, 2012	Notes: Meitantei Conan: Kako Kara no Zensōkyoku Pureryūdo (名探偵コナン 過去からの前奏曲～プレリュード～, lit. Detective Conan: Prelude from the Past) is developed by Bandai.
Meitantei Conan: Marionetto Kōkyōkyoku (Shinfonī) Original release date(s): JP: April 25, 2013	Release years by system: 2013 – Nintendo 3DS
Meitantei Conan: Marionetto Kōkyōkyoku (Shinfonī) Original release date(s): JP: April 25, 2013	Notes: Meitantei Conan: Marionetto Kōkyōkyoku (Shinfonī) (名探偵コナン マリオネット交響曲(シンフォニー), lit. Detective Conan: Marionette Symphony) is developed by Bandai.
Meitantei Conan: Fantomu Kyōshikyoku (Rapusodī) Original release date(s): JP: April 17, 2014	Release years by system: 2014 – Nintendo 3DS
Meitantei Conan: Fantomu Kyōshikyoku (Rapusodī) Original release date(s): JP: April 17, 2014	Notes: Meitantei Conan: Fantomu Kyōshikyoku (Rapusodī) (名探偵コナン ファントム狂詩曲(ラプソディー), lit. Detective Conan: Phantom Rhapsody) is developed by Bandai.

=== Home console ===
Game	Details
Meitantei Conan Original release date(s): JP: November 19, 1998	Release years by system: 1998 – PlayStation
Meitantei Conan Original release date(s): JP: November 19, 1998	Notes: Detective Conan (名探偵コナン, Meitantei Conan) is developed by Bandai.
Meitantei Conan: 3 Nin no Meisuiri Original release date(s): Normal edition: JP: August 10, 2000; Bandai the Best: JP: July 4, 2002	Release years by system: 2000 – PlayStation
Meitantei Conan: 3 Nin no Meisuiri Original release date(s): Normal edition: JP: August 10, 2000; Bandai the Best: JP: July 4, 2002	Notes: Meitantei Conan: 3 Nin no Meisuiri (名探偵コナン 3人の名推理, lit. Detective Conan: Three Great Deductions) is developed by Bandai.
Meitantei Conan: Saikou no Aibou Original release date(s): JP: April 25, 2002	Release years by system: 2002 – PlayStation
Meitantei Conan: Saikou no Aibou Original release date(s): JP: April 25, 2002	Notes: Meitantei Conan: Saikou no Aibou (名探偵コナン 最高の相棒, lit. Detective Conan: The Best Partner) is developed by Bandai.
Meitantei Conan The Board Game Original release date(s): JP: August 29, 2002	Release years by system: 2002 – PlayStation
Meitantei Conan The Board Game Original release date(s): JP: August 29, 2002	Notes: Meitantei Conan The Board Game (名探偵コナン The ボードゲーム, lit. Detective Conan: The Board Game) is developed by Bandai.
Meitantei Conan: Trick Trick Vol. 1 Original release date(s): JP: April 17, 2003	Release years by system: 2003 – PlayStation
Meitantei Conan: Trick Trick Vol. 1 Original release date(s): JP: April 17, 2003	Notes: Meitantei Conan: Trick Trick Vol. 1 (名探偵コナン トリックトリック Vol. 1, lit. Detective Conan: Trick Trick Vol. 1) is developed by Bandai.
Meitantei Conan: Daiei Teikoku no Isan Original release date(s): JP: November 18, 2004	Release years by system: 2004 – PlayStation 2
Meitantei Conan: Daiei Teikoku no Isan Original release date(s): JP: November 18, 2004	Notes: Meitantei Conan: Daiei Teikoku no Isan (名探偵コナン 大英帝国の遺産, lit. Detective Conan: Legacy of the British Empire) is developed by Bandai.
Case Closed: The Mirapolis Investigation Original release date(s): JP: May 17, 2007; PAL: April 3, 2009	Release years by system: 2007 – Wii
Case Closed: The Mirapolis Investigation Original release date(s): JP: May 17, 2007; PAL: April 3, 2009	Notes: Known in Japan as Meitantei Conan: Tsuioku no Mirage (名探偵コナン 追憶の幻想, lit. Detective Conan: Memories of Illusions) and is developed by Marvelous Entertainment.; The only Case Closed game to be localized into English and released in the PAL region.
Meitantei Conan Skateboard Run: Kaitou Kid to Shinpi no Hihou Original release date(s): JP: April 11, 2019	Release years by system: 2019 – Nintendo Switch
Meitantei Conan Skateboard Run: Kaitou Kid to Shinpi no Hihou Original release date(s): JP: April 11, 2019	Notes: Meitantei Conan Skateboard Run: Kaitou Kid to Shinpi no Hihou (名探偵コナン スケボーラン 怪盗キッドと神秘の秘宝, lit. Detective Conan Skateboard Run: Phantom Thief Kid and the Mysterious Treasures) is developed by NicoLabo.
