= List of Game Boy games =

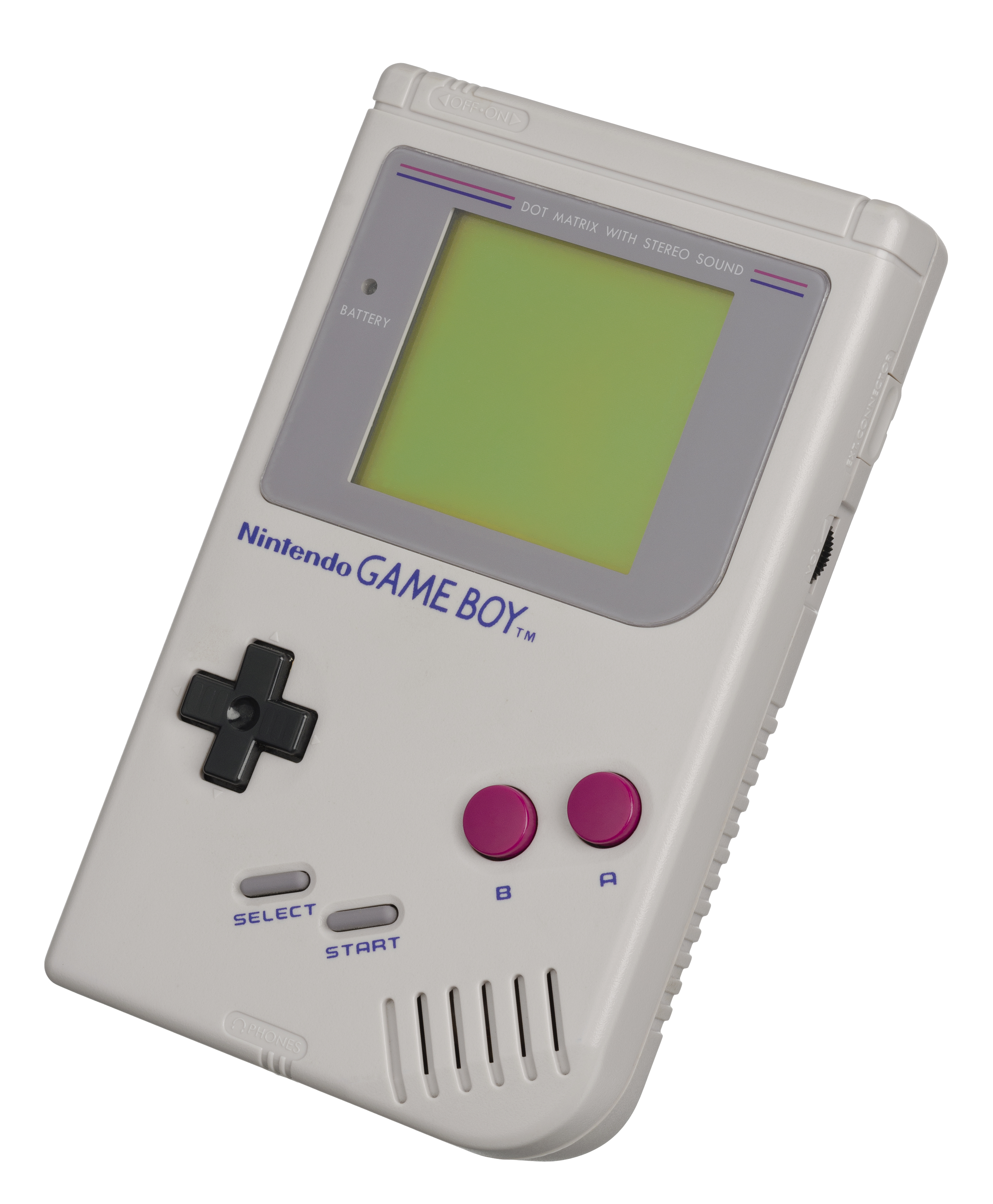
The original model of the Game Boy

The Game Boy portable system has a library of games, which were released in plastic ROM cartridges. The Game Boy first launched in Japan on April 21, 1989, with Super Mario Land, Alleyway, Baseball, and Yakuman. For the North American launches, Tetris and Tennis were also featured, while Yakuman was never released outside of Japan. The last games to be published for the system were the Japan-only titles Shikakui Atama o Maruku Suru: Kanji no Tatsujin and Shikakui Atama o Maruku Suru: Keisan no Tatsujin, both released on March 30, 2001.

This list is initially organized alphabetically by their English titles, or, when Japan-exclusive, their rōmaji transliterations; however, it is also possible to sort each column individually by clicking the square icon at the top of each column. The Game Boy system is not region locked, meaning that software purchased in any region can be played on any region's hardware. For Game Boy Color cartridges compatible with the original Game Boy, see those indicated in List of Game Boy Color games.

== List of games ==
This is a sortable list of 1043 games released for the Game Boy handheld video game system, excluding any cancelled and unlicensed games.

List of Game Boy games
Title	Developer(s)	Publisher(s)	Release date		
Title	Developer(s)	Publisher(s)	Japan	North America	PAL region
3 Chōme no Tama: Tama and Friends – 3 Chōme Obake Panic!!	Tom Create	B-AI	August 5, 1994	Unreleased	Unreleased
3-Pun Yosō Umaban Club	Hect	Hect	October 16, 1992	Unreleased	Unreleased
4-in-1 Fun Pak	Beam Software	Interplay ^{NA/EU} Imagineer ^{JP}	December 22, 1992	September 1992	1992
4-in-1 Funpak: Volume II	Beam Software	Interplay	Unreleased	August 1993	September 1995
Aa Harimanada	Atelier Double	ASK Kodansha	July 23, 1993	Unreleased	Unreleased
The Addams Family	Ocean	Ocean ^{NA/EU} Misawa ^{JP}	October 23, 1992	January 1992	June 1992
The Addams Family: Pugsley's Scavenger Hunt	Enigma Variations	Ocean	Unreleased	July 1993	July 1993
Adventure Island; Takahashi Meijin no Boken Jima II ^{JP}	Hudson Soft	Hudson Soft	March 6, 1992	February 1992	April 23, 1992
Adventure Island II: Aliens in Paradise; Takahashi Meijin no Boken Jima III ^{JP} Adventure Island II ^{EU}	Now Production	Hudson Soft	February 26, 1993	February 1993	October 1993
Adventures of Lolo; Lolo no Daibōken ^{JP}	HAL Laboratory	Imagineer ^{JP} Nintendo ^{EU}	March 25, 1994	Unreleased	October 1995
The Adventures of Rocky and Bullwinkle and Friends	Imagineering	THQ	Unreleased	October 1992	Unreleased
The Adventures of Star Saver; Rubble Saver ^{JP}	A-Wave	Taito ^{NA/EU} King Records ^{JP}	May 17, 1991	March 1992	June 1992
Aerostar	Vic Tokai	Vic Tokai	June 28, 1991	September 1991	March 1992
After Burst	Dual	NCS	October 26, 1990	Unreleased	Unreleased
Aguri Suzuki F-1 Super Driving	Pixel	LOZC G. Amusements	May 28, 1993	Unreleased	Unreleased
Akazukin Cha Cha	Access	Tomy	April 28, 1995	Unreleased	Unreleased
Aladdin	NMS Software	Virgin Interactive Entertainment ^{NA/EU} THQ ^{NA}	Unreleased	October 1995	December 8, 1994
Alfred Chicken	Twilight	Mindscape ^{NA/EU} Sunsoft ^{JP}	July 28, 1995	February 1994	April 1993
Alien Olympics 2044 AD	Dark Technologies	Ocean	Unreleased	Unreleased	September 1994
Alien vs Predator: The Last of His Clan; Alien vs. Predator ^{JP}	ASK Kodansha	Activision ^{NA} ASK Kodansha ^{JP}	September 24, 1993	November 1993	Unreleased
Alien³	Bits Studios	LJN ^{NA/EU} Acclaim Japan ^{JP}	July 9, 1993	January 1993	October 21, 1993
All-Star Baseball '99	Realtime Associates	Acclaim	Unreleased	May 1998	Unreleased
Alleyway	Nintendo R&D1; Intelligent Systems	Nintendo	April 21, 1989	August 1, 1989	September 28, 1990
Altered Space: A 3-D Alien Adventure	Software Creations	Sony Imagesoft ^{NA} Epic/Sony Records ^{JP} Hi Tech Expressions ^{EU}	November 29, 1991	September 1991	December 1992
Amazing Penguin; Osawagase! Penguin Boy ^{JP}	Natsume Co., Ltd.	Natsume Co., Ltd.	August 8, 1990	December 1990	December 1992
The Amazing Spider-Man	Rare	LJN ^{NA} Nintendo ^{EU}	Unreleased	July 1990	November 21, 1991
The Amazing Spider-Man 2	Bits Studios	LJN	Unreleased	August 1992	January 1993
Amazing Tater; Puzzle Boy II ^{JP}	Atlus	Atlus	August 2, 1991	February 1992	Unreleased
America Ōdan Ultra Quiz		Tomy	December 23, 1990	Unreleased	Unreleased
America Ōdan Ultra Quiz Part 2		Tomy	December 20, 1991	Unreleased	Unreleased
America Ōdan Ultra Quiz Part 3		Tomy	November 27, 1992	Unreleased	Unreleased
America Ōdan Ultra Quiz Part 4		Tomy	October 29, 1993	Unreleased	Unreleased
Amida	Sofix	Coconuts Japan	October 23, 1990	Unreleased	Unreleased
Animal Breeder		J-Wing	September 11, 1997	Unreleased	Unreleased
Animal Breeder 2		J-Wing	May 15, 1998	Unreleased	Unreleased
Animaniacs	Factor 5	Konami	Unreleased	July 1995	July 27, 1995
Another Bible	Dice	Atlus	March 3, 1995	Unreleased	Unreleased
Aoki Densetsu Shoot!		Banpresto	April 7, 1995	Unreleased	Unreleased
Arcade Classic No. 1: Asteroids / Missile Command	The Code Monkeys	Nintendo	Unreleased	July 1995	October 26, 1995
Arcade Classic No. 2: Centipede / Millipede	The Code Monkeys	Nintendo	Unreleased	August 1995	November 23, 1995
Arcade Classic No. 3: Galaga / Galaxian; Galaga & Galaxian ^{JP}	Namco	Namco ^{JP} Nintendo ^{NA/EU}	July 14, 1995	September 1995	December 14, 1995
Arcade Classic No. 4: Defender / Joust	Williams	Nintendo	Unreleased	October 1995	December 14, 1995
Arcade Classics: Super Breakout / Battlezone	Black Pearl Software	Black Pearl Software	Unreleased	October 1996	October 1996
Aretha	Japan Art Media	Yanoman	November 16, 1990	Unreleased	Unreleased
Aretha II	Japan Art Media	Yanoman	September 27, 1991	Unreleased	Unreleased
Aretha III	Japan Art Media	Yanoman	October 16, 1992	Unreleased	Unreleased
Asmik-kun World 2	Cyclone System	Asmik Ace Entertainment	May 24, 1991	Unreleased	Unreleased
Asterix	Bit Managers	Infogrames	Unreleased	Unreleased	April 1993
Asterix & Obelix	Bit Managers	Infogrames	Unreleased	Unreleased	April 1995
Asteroids	The Code Monkeys	Accolade	Unreleased	February 1992	July 1992
Astro Rabby	Cyclone System	IGS	October 12, 1990	Unreleased	Unreleased
Atomic Punk; Bomber Boy ^{JP} Dynablaster ^{EU}	Hudson Soft	Hudson Soft	August 31, 1990	May 1991	July 1991
Attack of the Killer Tomatoes; Killer Tomato ^{JP}	Equilibrium	THQ ^{NA} Nintendo ^{EU} Altron ^{JP}	March 19, 1993	January 1992	December 1992
Avenging Spirit; Phantasm ^{JP}	Jaleco	Jaleco	November 6, 1992	December 1992	February 1993
Ayakashi no Shiro		SETA Corporation	May 25, 1990	Unreleased	Unreleased
Baby T-Rex ^{EU} We're Back! A Dinosaur's Story; Bamse ^{SW} AgroSoar ^{AU}	Beam Software	Hi Tech Expressions ^{NA} Laser Beam Entertainment ^{AU/EU}	Unreleased	October 1993	August 1993
Bakenō TV '94	Graphic Research	Asmik Ace Entertainment	October 28, 1994	Unreleased	Unreleased
Bakenō V3	Graphic Research	Asmik Ace Entertainment	December 17, 1993	Unreleased	Unreleased
Bakuchō Retrieve Master	TOSE	Konami	October 15, 1998	Unreleased	Unreleased
Bakuchō Retsuden Shō: Hyper Fishing		Starfish	July 24, 1998	Unreleased	Unreleased
Balloon Kid	Nintendo R&D1; Pax Softnica	Nintendo	Unreleased	October 5, 1990	January 31, 1991
Banishing Racer		Jaleco	July 26, 1991	Unreleased	Unreleased
Barbie: Game Girl	Imagineering	Hi Tech Expressions	Unreleased	October 1992	October 1992
Bart Simpson's Escape from Camp Deadly; Bart no Survival Camp ^{JP}	Imagineering	Acclaim ^{NA/EU} Acclaim Japan ^{JP}	February 26, 1993	November 1991	February 1993
Baseball	Intelligent Systems	Nintendo	April 21, 1989	August 1, 1989	December 1995
Bases Loaded; Baseball Kids ^{JP}	TOSE	Jaleco	March 15, 1990	July 1990	Unreleased
Bass Fishing Tatsujin Techō		Starfish	June 21, 1996	Unreleased	Unreleased
Batman Forever	Probe Entertainment Limited	Acclaim ^{NA/EU} Acclaim Japan ^{JP}	October 27, 1995	September 7, 1995	September 28, 1995
Batman: Return of the Joker	Sunsoft	Sunsoft	March 28, 1992	May 1992	November 26, 1992
Batman: The Animated Series	Konami	Konami	Unreleased	November 1993	November 1993
Batman: The Video Game; Batman ^{JP}	Sunsoft	Sunsoft	April 13, 1990	June 1990	December 15, 1991
Battle Arena Toshinden; Nettō Toshinden ^{JP}	Betop	Takara ^{JP} Nintendo ^{NA} Laguna ^{EU}	March 22, 1996	November 1996	July 1996
Battle Bull	Jorudan	SETA Corporation	November 30, 1990	January 1991	Unreleased
Battle City	Nova Games	Nova Games	August 9, 1991	Unreleased	Unreleased
Battle Crusher	Sun L	Banpresto	January 25, 1995	Unreleased	Unreleased
Battle Dodge Ball	Sun L	Banpresto	October 16, 1992	Unreleased	Unreleased
Battle of Kingdom	Lenar	Meldac	December 13, 1991	Unreleased	Unreleased
The Battle of Olympus	Radical Entertainment	Imagineer	Unreleased	Unreleased	March 1993
Battle Pingpong	Quest	Quest	August 31, 1990	Unreleased	Unreleased
Battle Space		Namco	December 25, 1992	Unreleased	Unreleased
Battle Unit Zeoth	Jaleco	Jaleco	December 21, 1990	July 1991	May 1992
Battleship; Kaisen Game: Navy Blue ^{JP}	Pack-In-Video	Use Corporation ^{JP} Mindscape ^{NA/EU}	December 22, 1989	December 1992	September 1993
Battletoads	Rare	Tradewest ^{NA/EU} NCS ^{JP}	January 7, 1994	November 1991	February 25, 1993
Battletoads & Double Dragon: The Ultimate Team	Rare	Tradewest ^{NA} Sony Imagesoft ^{EU}	Unreleased	December 1993	April 1993
Battletoads in Ragnarok's World	Rare	Tradewest	Unreleased	June 1993	July 1993
Beavis and Butt-head	Torus Games	GT Interactive	Unreleased	March 1999	March 1999
Beethoven	Unexpected Development	Hi Tech Expressions	Unreleased	Unreleased	January 1995
Beetlejuice	Rare	LJN	Unreleased	January 1992	Unreleased
Best of the Best: Championship Karate; The Kick Boxing ^{JP}	Loriciels	Electro Brain ^{NA} Loriciels ^{EU} Micro World ^{JP}	March 19, 1993	December 1992	February 1993
Bikkuri Nekketsu Shin Kiroku! Dokodemo Kin Medal	Million Corp.	Technōs Japan	July 16, 1993	Unreleased	Unreleased
Bill & Ted's Excellent Game Boy Adventure: A Bogus Journey!	Beam Software	LJN	Unreleased	August 1991	March 1992
Bill Elliott's NASCAR Fast Tracks	Distinctive Software	Konami	Unreleased	December 1991	Unreleased
Bionic Battler; VS Battler ^{JP}	Copya Systems	Use Corporation ^{JP} Electro Brain ^{NA}	August 10, 1990	November 1992	Unreleased
Bionic Commando	Minakuchi Engineering	Capcom	July 24, 1992	October 1992	April 1993
Bishōjo Senshi Sailor Moon	Arc System Works	Angel	December 18, 1992	Unreleased	Unreleased
Bishōjo Senshi Sailor Moon R	Angel	Angel	April 22, 1994	Unreleased	Unreleased
Black Bass: Lure Fishing; Hyper Black Bass ^{JP}	Hot B	Hot B	August 28, 1992	January 1994	Unreleased
Blades of Steel	Konami	Ultra Games ^{NA} Palcom Software ^{EU} Konami ^{JP}	November 27, 1992	August 1991	February 27, 1992
Blaster Master Boy; Blaster Master Jr. ^{EU} Bomber King: Scenario 2 ^{JP}	Sunsoft	Sunsoft	August 23, 1991	February 1992	March 1992
Block Kuzushi GB	OeRSTED	Pow	December 29, 1995	Unreleased	Unreleased
Blodia		Tonkin House	April 20, 1990	Unreleased	Unreleased
The Blues Brothers	Titus Software	Titus Software	Unreleased	June 1992	May 19, 1993
The Blues Brothers: Jukebox Adventure	Titus Software	Titus Software	Unreleased	Unreleased	July 1994
Bo Jackson: Two Games In One	Equilibrium	THQ	Unreleased	June 1991	Unreleased
Boggle Plus	Sculptured Software	Parker Brothers	Unreleased	February 1992	Unreleased
Bomb Jack	Bit Managers	Infogrames	Unreleased	Unreleased	February 25, 1993
Bomberman GB; Bomberman GB 2 ^{JP}	S-Plan; A.I	Hudson Soft ^{JP} Nintendo ^{NA} Virgin Interactive Entertainment ^{EU}	August 10, 1995	April 10, 1998	October 1995
Bomberman GB 3	A.I	Hudson Soft	December 20, 1996	Unreleased	Unreleased
Bonk's Adventure; GB Genjin ^{JP} B.C. Kid ^{EU}	Red Company; Mutech	Hudson Soft	November 27, 1992	December 1992	February 1993
Bonk's Revenge; GB Genjin 2 ^{JP} B.C. Kid 2 ^{EU}	A.I	Hudson Soft	October 21, 1994	November 1994	May 1995
Booby Boys	Nichibutsu	Nichibutsu	June 25, 1993	Unreleased	Unreleased
Boomer's Adventure in ASMIK World; Teke! Teke! Asmik-kun World ^{JP}	Dual	Asmik Ace Entertainment ^{JP} Asmik Corporation of America ^{NA}	December 27, 1989	April 1990	Unreleased
Boulder Dash	Beam Software	Victor Interactive Software ^{JP} Nintendo ^{EU}	September 21, 1990	Unreleased	November 1991
Boxxle; Sōkoban ^{JP}	Atelier Double	Pony Canyon ^{JP} FCI ^{NA/EU}	September 1, 1989	February 1990	February 27, 1992
Boxxle II; Sōkoban 2 ^{JP}	Atelier Double	Pony Canyon ^{JP} FCI ^{NA}	June 22, 1990	June 1992	Unreleased
Brain Drain	Visual Impact	Acclaim ^{NA} Acclaim Japan ^{JP} Bandai ^{EU}	July 31, 1998	March 1998	November 1997
Brainbender; Migrain ^{JP}	Gremlin Graphics	Electro Brain ^{NA} Gremlin Graphics ^{EU} Acclaim Japan ^{JP}	April 24, 1992	November 1991	December 1994
Bram Stoker's Dracula	Probe Entertainment Limited	Sony Imagesoft	Unreleased	September 1993	October 1993
BreakThru!	Realtime Associates	Spectrum HoloByte	Unreleased	January 1995	Unreleased
Bubble Bobble	Taito	Taito	December 7, 1990	March 1991	January 30, 1992
Bubble Bobble Part 2 Bubble Bobble Junior ^{JP}	OLM; Taito	Taito	May 28, 1993	July 1993	August 1994
Bubble Ghost	Opera House	FCI ^{NA/EU} Pony Canyon ^{JP}	December 21, 1990	November 1990	August 27, 1992
Bubsy II	Accolade	Telstar ^{EU} Accolade ^{NA}	Unreleased	August 1995	August 1995
The Bugs Bunny Crazy Castle; Mickey Mouse ^{JP}	Kotobuki Systems	Kemco	September 5, 1989	March 1990	August 22, 1991
The Bugs Bunny Crazy Castle 2 Mickey Mouse II ^{JP} Mickey Mouse ^{EU} Hugo ^{EU}	Kotobuki Systems	Kemco; Laguna ^{EU}	April 26, 1991	September 1991	June 1992
Burai Fighter Deluxe; Burai Senshi Deluxe ^{JP}	KID	Taito ^{JP} Taxan ^{NA/EU}	June 27, 1990	January 1991	December 5, 1992
BurgerTime Deluxe	Data East	Data East	February 15, 1991	March 1991	February 1992
Burning Paper	Pixel	LOZC G. Amusements	February 26, 1993	Unreleased	Unreleased
Bust-A-Move 2: Arcade Edition; Puzzle Bobble GB ^{JP}	Probe Entertainment Limited	Acclaim ^{NA/EU} Taito ^{JP}	April 10, 1998	February 1998	February 1998
Bust-a-Move 3 DX	Probe Entertainment Limited	Taito	Unreleased	Unreleased	October 1998
Buster Brothers; Pang ^{EU}		Hudson Soft	Unreleased	October 1993	October 1993
Caesars Palace	Magnin and Associates	Arcadia Systems ^{NA} Ocean ^{EU} Coconuts Japan ^{JP}	August 7, 1992	June 1991	April 1992
Capcom Quiz: Hatena? no Daibōken		Capcom	December 21, 1990	Unreleased	Unreleased
Captain America and The Avengers	Realtime Associates	Mindscape	Unreleased	February 1994	Unreleased
Captain Tsubasa J: Zenkoku Seiha Heno Chōsen		Bandai	September 14, 1995	Unreleased	Unreleased
Captain Tsubasa VS	Graphic Research	Tecmo	March 27, 1992	Unreleased	Unreleased
Card Game	Marionette	Coconuts Japan	June 15, 1990	Unreleased	Unreleased
Casino FunPak	Beam Software	Interplay	Unreleased	January 1995	October 1995
Casper	Bonsai Entertainment	Natsume Inc. ^{NA} Laguna ^{EU}	Unreleased	November 1996	May 1997
Castelian; Kyoro-Chan Land ^{JP}	Bits Studios	Triffix ^{NA} The Sales Curve ^{EU} Hiro ^{JP}	October 30, 1992	May 1991	February 1991
Castle Quest		Hudson Soft	Unreleased	Unreleased	October 1993
Castlevania II: Belmont's Revenge	Konami	Konami	July 12, 1991	August 1991	November 26, 1992
Castlevania Legends	Konami Computer Entertainment Nagoya	Konami	November 27, 1997	March 1998	March 26, 1998
Castlevania: The Adventure	Konami	Konami	October 27, 1989	December 1989	October 31, 1991
Catrap	Kodansha	Kodansha ^{JP} Asmik Corp. of America ^{NA}	June 1, 1990	September 1990	Unreleased
Cave Noire	Konami	Konami	April 19, 1991	Unreleased	Unreleased
Centipede	Accolade	Accolade	Unreleased	December 1992	November 1992
Chacha-Maru Panic		Human Entertainment	April 19, 1991	Unreleased	Unreleased
Chachamaru Bōkenki 3: Abyss no Tō		Human Entertainment	August 2, 1991	Unreleased	Unreleased
Chalvo 55	Japan System Supply	Japan System Supply	February 21, 1997	Unreleased	Unreleased
Championship Pool	Bitmasters	Mindscape	Unreleased	November 1993	Unreleased
Chase H.Q. Taito Chase H.Q. ^{JP}	Bits Studios	Taito ^{NA/JP} Bandai ^{EU}	January 11, 1991	December 1990	August 22, 1991
The Chessmaster	Park Place Productions	Hi Tech Expressions ^{NA} Nintendo ^{EU} Altron ^{JP}	October 28, 1994	January 1991	April 30, 1991
Chibi Maruko-Chan 2 : Deluxe Maruko World	KID	Takara	September 13, 1991	Unreleased	Unreleased
Chibi Maruko-Chan 3 : Mezase! Game Taishō no Maki	KID	Takara	March 27, 1992	Unreleased	Unreleased
Chibi Maruko Chan 4: Korega Nihon Dayo Ōji Sama	KID	Takara	August 7, 1992	Unreleased	Unreleased
Chibi Maruko Chan: Maruko Deluxe Gekijō	KID	Takara	May 26, 1995	Unreleased	Unreleased
Chibi Maruko Chan: Okozukai Daisakusen	KID	Takara	December 7, 1990	Unreleased	Unreleased
Chiki Chiki Machine Mō Race		Atlus	March 27, 1992	Unreleased	Unreleased
Chiki Chiki Tengoku		J-Wing	April 28, 1995	Unreleased	Unreleased
Chikyū Kaihō Gun ZAS	T&E Soft	T&E Soft	December 18, 1992	Unreleased	Unreleased
Choplifter II	Beam Software	Victor Interactive Software ^{JP} JVC Musical Industries ^{NA/EU}	June 21, 1991	September 1991	June 11, 1992
Choplifter III	Teeny Weeny Games	Ocean	Unreleased	Unreleased	December 18, 1997
Chō Majin Eiyūden: Wataru Mazekko Monster	Alpha Unit	Banpresto	December 12, 1997	Unreleased	Unreleased
Chō Majin Eiyūden: Wataru Mazekko Monster 2	Alpha Unit	Banpresto	August 7, 1998	Unreleased	Unreleased
Chōsoku Spinner	Amble	Hudson Soft	September 18, 1998	Unreleased	Unreleased
Chuck Rock	Spidersoft	Sony Imagesoft	Unreleased	December 1993	November 1993
Cliffhanger	Spidersoft	Sony Imagesoft	Unreleased	December 1993	December 1993
Collection Pocket		Naxat Soft	November 21, 1997	Unreleased	Unreleased
College Slam	Iguana Entertainment	Acclaim	Unreleased	March 1996	Unreleased
Contra: The Alien Wars; Contra Spirits^{JP} Probotector 2^{EU}	Factor 5	Konami	September 23, 1994	October 1994	September 1994
Cool Ball; Pop Up ^{EU}	Bit Managers	Infogrames ^{EU} Takara ^{NA}	Unreleased	August 1994	May 1992
Cool Hand	Tarantula Studios	Take-Two Interactive	Unreleased	Unreleased	October 1998
Cool Spot	NMS Software	Virgin Interactive Entertainment	Unreleased	October 1994	July 28, 1994
Cool World	Twilight	Ocean	Unreleased	June 1993	July 1993
Cosmo Tank	Asuka Technologies	Atlus	June 8, 1990	September 1990	Unreleased
Crayon Shin-Chan 2: Ora to Wanpaku Gokko Dazo	TOSE	Banalex	October 22, 1993	Unreleased	Unreleased
Crayon Shin-Chan 3: Ora no Gokigen Athletic	TOSE	Bandai	March 26, 1994	Unreleased	Unreleased
Crayon Shin-Chan 4: Ora no Itazura Dai Henshin	TOSE	Bandai	August 26, 1994	Unreleased	Unreleased
Crayon Shin-Chan: Ora no Gokigen Collection	TOSE	Bandai	December 20, 1996	Unreleased	Unreleased
Crayon Shin-Chan: Ora to Shiro ha Otomodachi Dayo	TOSE	Bandai	April 9, 1993	Unreleased	Unreleased
Crystal Quest	NovaLogic	Data East	Unreleased	September 1991	Unreleased
Cult Jump	Sun L	Bandai	September 10, 1993	Unreleased	Unreleased
Cultmaster: Ultraman ni Miserarete	Minato Giken	Bandai	March 12, 1993	Unreleased	Unreleased
Cutthroat Island	Software Creations	Acclaim	Unreleased	January 1996	January 25, 1996
Cyraid; Bakuretsu Senshi Warrior ^{JP}	Epoch & SAS Sakata	Epoch ^{JP} Nexoft ^{NA}	April 13, 1990	March 1991	Unreleased
Daedalian Opus; Bōken! Puzzle Road ^{JP}	Vic Tokai	Vic Tokai	April 20, 1990	July 1990	Unreleased
Daffy Duck: The Marvin Missions; Daffy Duck ^{EU} Looney Tunes Series: Daffy Duck ^{JP}	Sunsoft	Sunsoft	September 30, 1994	January 1995	February 23, 1995
Dainiji Super Robot Taisen G	Winkysoft	Banpresto	June 30, 1995	Unreleased	Unreleased
Daikaijū Monogatari: Miracle of the Zone	A.I; Birthday	Hudson Soft	March 5, 1998	Unreleased	Unreleased
Daiku no Gen-san: Robot Teikoku no Yabō		Irem	March 25, 1994	Unreleased	Unreleased
Daisenryaku		Hiro	June 12, 1991	Unreleased	Unreleased
Darkman		Ocean	Unreleased	December 1992	November 1992
Darkwing Duck		Capcom	Unreleased	February 1993	October 21, 1993
David Crane's The Rescue of Princess Blobette; Fushigi na Blobby: Princess Blob wo Tsukue! ^{JP}	Imagineering	Jaleco ^{JP} Absolute Entertainment ^{NA} Nintendo ^{EU}	November 9, 1990	May 1991	October 1991
Days of Thunder	Argonaut Games	Mindscape	Unreleased	January 1992	February 1992
Dead Heat Scramble	Copya System	Copya System ^{JP} Electro Brain ^{NA}	April 20, 1990	December 1990	Unreleased
Dennis the Menace; Dennis ^{EU}	Ocean	Ocean	Unreleased	February 1994	December 1993
Desert Strike: Return to the Gulf	Ocean	Malibu Games ^{NA} Ocean Software ^{EU}	Unreleased	February 1995	November 1994
Dexterity; Funny Field ^{JP}	SNK	SNK	June 15, 1990	July 1990	January 1992
Dick Tracy	Realtime Associates	Bandai	Unreleased	December 1991	Unreleased
Dig Dug	Now Production	Namco	Unreleased	September 1992	October 1992
Dino Breeder	Digital Kids	J-Wing	August 22, 1997	Unreleased	Unreleased
Dino Breeder 2		J-Wing	June 5, 1998	Unreleased	Unreleased
Dirty Racing	Gremlin Graphics	Jaleco	January 8, 1993	Unreleased	Unreleased
Dodge Boy	TOSE	Tonkin House	December 6, 1991	Unreleased	Unreleased
Donkey Kong	Nintendo EAD; Pax Softnica	Nintendo	June 14, 1994	June 1994	September 24, 1994
Donkey Kong Land	Rare	Nintendo	July 27, 1995	June 1995	August 24, 1995
Donkey Kong Land 2	Rare	Nintendo	November 23, 1996	September 23, 1996	November 28, 1996
Donkey Kong Land III	Rare	Nintendo	Unreleased	October 1997	October 30, 1997
Doraemon 2: Animal Wakusei Densetsu	Agenda	Epoch	December 19, 1992	Unreleased	Unreleased
Doraemon Kart	Epoch	Epoch	March 20, 1998	Unreleased	Unreleased
Doraemon no GameBoy de Asobōyo DX10	Epoch	Epoch	November 27, 1998	Unreleased	Unreleased
Doraemon no Study Boy 1: Shōichi Koguko Kanji		Epoch	1997	Unreleased	Unreleased
Doraemon no Study Boy 2: Shōichi Sansū Keisan		Epoch	1997	Unreleased	Unreleased
Doraemon no Study Boy 3: Ku Ku Master		Epoch	1997	Unreleased	Unreleased
Doraemon no Study Boy 4: Shōni Kokugo Kanji		Epoch	1997	Unreleased	Unreleased
Doraemon no Study Boy 5: Shōni Sansū Keisan		Epoch	1997	Unreleased	Unreleased
Doraemon no Study Boy 6: Gakushū Kanji Master 1006		Epoch	1998	Unreleased	Unreleased
Doraemon: Taiketsu Himitsu Dogu!!	Epoch & SAS Sakata	Epoch	March 1, 1991	Unreleased	Unreleased
Double Dragon	Technōs Japan	Technōs Japan ^{JP} Tradewest ^{NA} Nintendo ^{EU}	July 20, 1990	August 1990	January 31, 1991
Double Dragon 3: The Arcade Game	The Sales Curve	Acclaim	Unreleased	August 1992	September 1992
Double Dragon II; Nekketsu Kōha Kunio-Kun: Bangai Rantōhen ^{JP}	Technōs Japan	Technōs Japan ^{JP} Acclaim ^{NA/EU}	December 7, 1990	December 1991	December 1991
Double Dribble: 5 on 5 Konamic Basket ^{JP} HyperDunk ^{EU}	Konami	Konami	September 25, 1992	December 1991	February 1994
Double Yakuman	Imagesoft	VAP	March 19, 1993	Unreleased	Unreleased
Double Yakuman II	Imagesoft	VAP	September 17, 1993	Unreleased	Unreleased
Double Yakuman Jr.	Imagesoft	VAP	August 19, 1993	Unreleased	Unreleased
Downtown Nekketsu Kōshinkyoku: Dokodemo Daiundōkai	Million Corp.	Technōs Japan	July 24, 1992	Unreleased	Unreleased
Downtown Special: Kunio-Kun no Jidaigeki Dayo Zenin Shūgō!	Technōs Japan	Technōs Japan	December 22, 1993	Unreleased	Unreleased
Dr. Franken	MotiveTime	Kemco ^{JP/NA} Elite Systems ^{EU}	December 18, 1992	December 1992	July 1992
Dr. Franken II	MotiveTime	Jaleco ^{NA} Elite Systems ^{EU}	Unreleased	October 1997	July 1993
Dr. Mario	Nintendo R&D1	Nintendo	July 27, 1990	December 1990	April 30, 1991
Dragon Ball Z: Goku Gekitōden	BEC Co., Ltd (Bandai Entertainment Company)	Bandai	August 25, 1995	Unreleased	Unreleased
Dragon Ball Z: Goku Hishōden	BEC Co., Ltd (Bandai Entertainment Company)	Bandai	November 25, 1994	Unreleased	Unreleased
Dragon Slayer Gaiden: Nemuri no Ōkan	Agenda	Epoch	March 6, 1992	Unreleased	Unreleased
Dragon Slayer I	Falcom	Epoch	August 12, 1990	Unreleased	Unreleased
Dragon's Lair: The Legend; Dragon's Lair ^{JP}	MotiveTime	Ubisoft ^{NA} Epic/Sony Records ^{JP} Elite Systems ^{EU}	October 25, 1991	January 1991	April 23, 1992
DragonHeart	Torus Games	Acclaim	Unreleased	May 1996	October 1996
Dropzone	Eurocom	Mindscape	Unreleased	Unreleased	February 1993
DuckTales	Capcom	Capcom	September 21, 1990	November 1990	December 5, 1991
DuckTales 2		Capcom	December 3, 1993	November 1993	April 28, 1994
Dungeon Land	Random House	Enix	December 15, 1992	Unreleased	Unreleased
DX Bakenō Z	Graphic Research	Asmik Ace Entertainment	April 17, 1992	Unreleased	Unreleased
Earthworm Jim	Eurocom	Playmates Interactive Entertainment	Unreleased	September 1995	October 26, 1995
Eijukugo Target 1000	C-Lab	Imagineer	March 28, 1997	Unreleased	Unreleased
Eiken 2-Kyū Level no Kaiwa Hyūgen 333		Imagineer	October 31, 1997	Unreleased	Unreleased
Eitango Target 1900	C-Lab	Imagineer	December 13, 1996	Unreleased	Unreleased
Elevator Action	Taito	Taito	August 9, 1991	December 1991	December 1991
Elite Soccer; World Cup Striker ^{JP} Soccer ^{EU}	Denton Designs	Coconuts Japan ^{JP} GameTek ^{NA/EU}	June 17, 1994	August 1994	August 1994
Extra Bases; Famista ^{JP}	Namco	Namco ^{JP} Bandai ^{NA}	September 14, 1990	April 1991	Unreleased
F-1 Race	Nintendo R&D1	Nintendo	November 9, 1990	February 3, 1991	October 10, 1991
F-15 Strike Eagle	NMS Software	MicroProse	Unreleased	June 1993	July 1993
F1 Pole Position; Satoru Nakajima Kanshū F-1 Hero GB '92: The Graded Driver ^{JP}	Natsu System	Varie ^{JP} Ubisoft ^{NA}	August 11, 1992	December 1993	December 1993
Faceball 2000	Xanth Software	Bullet-Proof Software	Unreleased	December 1991	Unreleased
Family Jockey	Use Corporation	Namco	March 29, 1991	Unreleased	Unreleased
Family Jockey 2: Meiba no Kettō	Use Corporation	Namco	August 27, 1993	Unreleased	Unreleased
Famista 2		Namco	July 30, 1992	Unreleased	Unreleased
Famista 3		Namco	October 29, 1993	Unreleased	Unreleased
Fastest Lap	KID	VAP ^{JP} NTVIC ^{NA}	March 20, 1991	February 1992	Unreleased
Felix the Cat	A.I	Hudson Soft ^{NA} Sony Electronics ^{EU}	Unreleased	July 1993	October 1993
Ferrari Grand Prix Challenge; Ferrari ^{JP}	System 3 NMS Software	Acclaim ^{NA/EU} Coconuts Japan ^{JP}	November 13, 1992	September 1992	October 1992
The Fidgetts	Game Over	Elite Systems ^{EU} Coconuts Japan ^{JP} Jaleco ^{NA}	April 22, 1994	October 1997	November 1993
FIFA International Soccer	Probe Entertainment Limited	Malibu Games	Unreleased	February 1995	February 1995
FIFA Soccer 96	Probe Entertainment Limited	Black Pearl Software	Unreleased	December 1995	November 23, 1995
FIFA Soccer 97; FIFA 97 ^{EU}	Tiertex Design Studios	Black Pearl Software	Unreleased	November 1996	December 19, 1996
FIFA: Road to World Cup 98	Tiertex Design Studios	THQ	Unreleased	Unreleased	1998
Fighting Simulator: 2-in-1 Flying Warriors; Hiryu no Ken Gaiden ^{JP}	Culture Brain	Culture Brain	December 22, 1990	April 1992	1992
Final Fantasy Adventure; Seiken Densetsu: Final Fantasy Gaiden ^{JP} Mystic Quest ^{EU}	Square	Square ^{JP/NA} Nintendo ^{EU}	June 28, 1991	November 1991	June 17, 1993
The Final Fantasy Legend; Makai Tōshi SaGa ^{JP}	Square	Square	December 15, 1989	September 1990	Unreleased
Final Fantasy Legend II; SaGa 2: Hihō Densetsu ^{JP}	Square	Square	December 14, 1990	November 1991	Unreleased
Final Fantasy Legend III; SaGa 3: Jikū no Hasha ^{JP}	Square	Square	December 13, 1991	August 1993	Unreleased
Final Reverse	Shōei System	Toei Animation	April 12, 1991	Unreleased	Unreleased
Fire Fighter	Teeny Weeny Games	Mindscape	Unreleased	Unreleased	May 1993
Fish Dude; Uoozu ^{JP}	Salio	Towa Chiki ^{JP} SOFEL ^{NA}	October 5, 1990	April 1991	Unreleased
Fist of the North Star: 10 Big Brawls for the King of the Universe; Hokuto no Ken: Seizetsu Jūban Shōbu ^{JP}	Shōei System	Toei Animation ^{JP} Electro Brain ^{NA}	December 22, 1989	April 1990	Unreleased
Flappy Special		Victor Interactive Software	March 23, 1990	Unreleased	Unreleased
The Flash	Equilibrium	THQ	Unreleased	March 1992	August 1992
Fleet Commander Vs.		ASCII Corporation	August 2, 1991	Unreleased	Unreleased
The Flintstones	Twilight	Ocean	Unreleased	December 1994	December 1994
The Flintstones: King Rock Treasure Island	Taito	Taito	Unreleased	February 1993	February 1993
Flipull: An Exciting Cube Game	Taito	Taito	March 16, 1990	April 1990	Unreleased
Football International; Soccer ^{JP}	TOSE	Tonkin House ^{JP} Bandai ^{EU}	June 7, 1991	Unreleased	May 1992
Foreman for Real	Software Creations	Acclaim	October 27, 1995	September 1995	September 28, 1995
Fortified Zone	Jaleco	Jaleco	February 26, 1991	September 1991	March 19, 1992
Frank Thomas Big Hurt Baseball	Realtime Associates	Acclaim	Unreleased	December 1995	November 1995
Franky, Joe & Dirk: On The Tiles	Audio Visual Magic	Elite Systems	Unreleased	Unreleased	March 1993
Frisky Tom	Nichibutsu	Nichibutsu	July 14, 1995	Unreleased	Unreleased
Frogger	Majesco	Majesco	Unreleased	August 1998	Unreleased
Fushigi no Dungeon: Furai no Shiren GB: Tsukikagemura no Kaibutsu	Chunsoft	Chunsoft	November 22, 1996	Unreleased	Unreleased
G-Arms: Operation Gundam		Bandai	May 18, 1991	Unreleased	Unreleased
G1 King! 3-Hitsu no Yosōya	Graphic Research	Vic Tokai	March 26, 1993	Unreleased	Unreleased
Gakken Kanyōku: Kotowaza 210		Imagineer	January 30, 1998	Unreleased	Unreleased
Gakken Rekishi 512	Sun-Tec	Imagineer	May 29, 1998	Unreleased	Unreleased
Gakken Shiaza Jukugo 288		Imagineer	January 30, 1998	Unreleased	Unreleased
Game & Watch Gallery	Nintendo R&D1; TOSE	Nintendo	February 1, 1997	May 1997	August 28, 1997
Game Boy Gallery	TOSE	Nintendo	Unreleased	Unreleased	April 27, 1995
Game & Watch Gallery 2	TOSE	Nintendo	September 27, 1997	Unreleased	Unreleased
Game Boy Wars	Intelligent Systems	Nintendo	May 21, 1991	Unreleased	Unreleased
Game Boy Wars Turbo	Hudson Soft	Hudson Soft	June 27, 1997	Unreleased	Unreleased
Game de Hakken!! Tamagotchi 2	Tom Create	Bandai	October 17, 1997	Unreleased	Unreleased
Game de Hakken!! Tamagotchi Osucchi to Mesucchi	Tom Create	Bandai	January 15, 1998	Unreleased	Unreleased
The Game of Harmony	The Code Monkeys	Accolade	Unreleased	February 1991	Unreleased
Gamera: Daikaijū Kūchū Kessen	KID	Angel	March 3, 1995	Unreleased	Unreleased
Ganbare Goemon: Sarawareta Ebisumaru!	Konami	Konami	December 25, 1991	Unreleased	Unreleased
Ganso!! Yancha-Maru		Irem	July 11, 1991	Unreleased	Unreleased
Gargoyle's Quest	Capcom	Capcom^{NA/JP} Nintendo^{EU}	May 2, 1990	July 1990	April 11, 1991
Gauntlet II	Eastridge Technology	Mindscape	Unreleased	September 1991	February 1992
GB Genjin Land: Viva! Chikkun Ōkoku	A.I; Amble	Hudson Soft	April 22, 1994	Unreleased	Unreleased
GB Pachi-Slot Hisshōhō Jr.		Sammy Corporation	July 29, 1994	Unreleased	Unreleased
Gear Works	Teque Interactive	Sony Imagesoft	Unreleased	October 1993	October 1993
Gegege no Kitarō: Yōkai Sōzōshu Arawaru!	Act Japan	Bandai	December 13, 1996	Unreleased	Unreleased
Gekitō Power Modeler	Japan System Supply	Capcom	November 27, 1998	Unreleased	Unreleased
Gem Gem	Graphic Research	Vic Tokai	March 29, 1991	Unreleased	Unreleased
Genjin Kotts	KID	B-AI	March 24, 1995	Unreleased	Unreleased
Genki Bakuhatsu Ganbaruger	Sun L	Tomy	November 27, 1992	Unreleased	Unreleased
George Foreman's KO Boxing	Beam Software	Acclaim	Unreleased	September 1992	November 1992
The Getaway: High Speed II	Unexpected Development	Williams	Unreleased	December 1995	Unreleased
Ghostbusters II; Ghostbusters 2 ^{JP}	HAL Laboratory	Activision ^{EU/NA} HAL Laboratory ^{JP}	October 16, 1990	December 1990	January 30, 1992
Ginga	Hot B	Hot B	December 14, 1990	Unreleased	Unreleased
Go Go Ackman		Banpresto	August 25, 1995	Unreleased	Unreleased
Go! Go! Hitchhike	Ocarina System	J-Wing	July 10, 1998	Unreleased	Unreleased
Go! Go! Tank	Copya Systems	Copya Systems ^{JP} Electro Brain ^{NA}	November 30, 1990	May 1991	Unreleased
Goal! J.Cup Soccer ^{JP} Takeda Nobuhiro no Ace Striker ^{JP}	TOSE	Jaleco	July 23, 1993	August 1993	September 1993
God Medicine: Fantasy Sekai no Tanjō	KCE Nagoya	Konami	July 20, 1993	Unreleased	Unreleased
Godzilla; Gojira-kun: Kaiju Daikoshin ^{JP}	Compile	Toho ^{NA/JP} Nintendo ^{EU}	December 18, 1990	October 1990	August 27, 1992
Golf	Nintendo R&D2; HAL Laboratory	Nintendo	November 28, 1989	February 1990	September 28, 1990
Gōkaku Boy Series - 99 Nendo Ban Eitango Center 1500	C-Lab	Imagineer	July 10, 1998	Unreleased	Unreleased
Gradius: The Interstellar Assault; Nemesis II ^{JP} Nemesis II: The Return of the Hero ^{EU}	Konami	Konami	August 9, 1991	January 1992	July 1992
Grander Musashi RV	TOSE	Bandai	July 24, 1998	Unreleased	Unreleased
Great Greed; Bitamīna Ōkoku Monogatari ^{JP}	Namco	Namco	September 17, 1992	April 1993	Unreleased
Gremlins 2: The New Batch	Sunsoft	Sunsoft	December 21, 1990	January 1991	April 23, 1992
HAL Wrestling; Pro Wrestling ^{JP}	Human Entertainment	Human Entertainment ^{JP} HAL Laboratory ^{NA}	September 14, 1990	December 1990	Unreleased
Hammerin' Harry: Ghost Building Company; Daiku no Gen-san: Ghost Building Company ^{JP}	Tamtex	Irem	July 31, 1992	Cancelled	June 1993
Harvest Moon GB; Bokujō Monogatari GB ^{JP}	Victor Interactive Software	Victor Interactive Software ^{JP} Natsume Inc. ^{NA}	December 19, 1997	August 1998	Unreleased
Hatris	Bullet-Proof Software	Bullet-Proof Software	July 19, 1991	May 1991	Unreleased
Hayaoshi Quiz: Ōza Ketteisen		Jaleco	July 31, 1998	Unreleased	Unreleased
Heavyweight Championship Boxing; Boxing ^{JP}	TOSE	Tonkin House ^{JP} Activision ^{NA}	May 18, 1990	September 1990	Unreleased
Heiankyo Alien	Hyperware	Meldac	January 14, 1990	April 1990	Unreleased
Heisei Tensai Bakabon		Namco	February 28, 1992	Unreleased	Unreleased
Heracles no Eikō: Ugokidashita Kamigami	Data East & SAS Sakata	Data East	December 27, 1992	Unreleased	Unreleased
Hercules	Tiertex Design Studios	THQ	Unreleased	July 1997	November 27, 1997
Hero Shugo!! Pinball Party		Jaleco	January 12, 1990	Unreleased	Unreleased
Hiden Inyo Kikoho: Ca Da		Yonezawa PR21	November 22, 1991	Unreleased	Unreleased
Higashio Osamu Kanshū Pro Yakyū Stadium '91		Tokuma Shoten	August 9, 1991	Unreleased	Unreleased
Higashio Osamu Kanshū Pro Yakyū Stadium '92		Tokuma Shoten	July 17, 1992	Unreleased	Unreleased
High Stakes Gambling	Sculptured Software	Electro Brain	Unreleased	June 1992	Unreleased
Hit the Ice	Taito	Taito	Unreleased	October 1992	November 1992
Hitori de Dekirumon! Cooking Densetsu	Jorudan	VAP	December 18, 1992	Unreleased	Unreleased
Home Alone	Imagineering	THQ ^{NA/EU} Altron ^{JP}	June 26, 1992	November 1991	October 29, 1992
Home Alone 2: Lost in New York	Imagineering	THQ	Unreleased	October 1992	October 1992
Hon Shogi		Imagineer	November 25, 1994	Unreleased	Unreleased
Hong Kong	Onion Software	Tokuma Shoten	August 11, 1990	Unreleased	Unreleased
Honmei Boy	Nichibutsu	Nichibutsu	October 7, 1994	Unreleased	Unreleased
Honō no Dōkyūji: Dodge Danpei	Hudson Soft	Hudson Soft	April 24, 1992	Unreleased	Unreleased
Hook	Painting by Numbers	Sony Imagesoft ^{JP/NA} Ocean ^{EU}	April 3, 1992	April 1992	October 29, 1992
Hudson Hawk	Ocean	Sony Imagesoft ^{NA} Epic/Sony Records ^{JP}	March 13, 1992	December 1991	Unreleased
Hugo 2	Bit Managers	Laguna	Unreleased	Unreleased	October 1997
The Humans	Imagitec Design	GameTek	Unreleased	December 1992	April 25, 1996
The Hunchback of Notre Dame	Tiertex Design Studios	THQ	Unreleased	March 1997	September 1997
The Hunt for Red October	Beam Software	Hi Tech Expressions ^{NA/EU} Altron ^{JP}	April 28, 1992	May 1991	June 11, 1992
Hyper Black Bass '95		Black Label Games	October 20, 1995	Unreleased	Unreleased
Hyper Lode Runner: The Labyrinth of Doom; Hyper Lode Runner ^{JP}	TOSE	Bandai	September 21, 1989	February 1990	October 31, 1991
Ikari no Yōsai 2		Jaleco	February 21, 1992	Unreleased	Unreleased (Note: Although unlicensed by Nintendo for the European market, this game received an official release with permission of the current rights holder in 2025 under the title Fortified Zone 2.)
In Your Face	Jaleco	Jaleco	Unreleased	December 1990	Unreleased
The Incredible Crash Dummies	Software Creations	LJN	Unreleased	November 1992	January 1993
Indiana Jones and the Last Crusade; Indiana Jones: Saigo no Seisen ^{JP}	NMS Software	Ubisoft ^{NA/EU} Coconuts Japan ^{JP}	December 23, 1994	July 1994	December 19, 1996
Un Indien Dans La Ville	Titus Software	Titus Software	Unreleased	Unreleased	October 1995
Initial D Gaiden	MTO	Kodansha	March 6, 1998	Unreleased	Unreleased
International Superstar Soccer; World Soccer GB ^{JP}	KCE Nagoya	Konami	June 4, 1998	October 1998	June 1998
Ippatsu Gyakuten: DX Bakenō	Graphic Research	Asmik Ace Entertainment	May 17, 1991	Unreleased	Unreleased
Iron Man and X-O Manowar in Heavy Metal	Realtime Associates	Acclaim	Unreleased	November 14, 1996	August 1996
Ishida Masao no Tsumego Paradise		Pony Canyon	December 21, 1990	Unreleased	Unreleased
Ishido: The Way of Stones	Nexoft	ASCII Corporation ^{JP} Nexoft ^{NA}	August 2, 1990	November 1990	Unreleased
Itsudemo! Nyan to Wonderful	Yoshidayama Workshop	Banpresto	June 26, 1998	Unreleased	Unreleased
J-League Fighting Soccer: The King of Ace Strikers	Graphic Research	IGS	December 27, 1992	Unreleased	Unreleased
J-League Live '95	Graphic Research	Electronic Arts Victor	April 21, 1995	Unreleased	Unreleased
J-League Supporter Soccer		J-Wing	June 26, 1998	Unreleased	Unreleased
J-League Winning Goal	Graphic Research	Electronic Arts Victor	April 2, 1994	Unreleased	Unreleased
Jack Nicklaus Golf	Sculptured Software	Tradewest	Unreleased	May 1992	February 1993
James Bond 007	Saffire	Nintendo	Unreleased	February 9, 1998	January 29, 1998
Janken Man		NCS	December 27, 1991	Unreleased	Unreleased
Janshirō		Sammy Corporation	March 27, 1992	Unreleased	Unreleased
Janshirō II: Sekai Saikyō no Janshi		Sammy Corporation	March 18, 1994	Unreleased	Unreleased
Jantaku Boy		Namco	January 24, 1992	Unreleased	Unreleased
Jeep Jamboree: Off Road Adventure	Gremlin Graphics	Virgin Interactive Entertainment	Unreleased	July 1992	Unreleased
Jelly Boy	Probe Entertainment Limited	Ocean	Unreleased	Unreleased	February 1995
Jeopardy!	Data Design Interactive	GameTek	Unreleased	March 1991	Unreleased
Jeopardy! Platinum Edition	Data Design Interactive	GameTek	Unreleased	December 1996	Unreleased
Jeopardy! Sports Edition	Data Design Interactive	GameTek	Unreleased	May 1994	Unreleased
Jeopardy! Teen Tournament	Data Design Interactive	GameTek	Unreleased	December 1996	Unreleased
The Jetsons: Robot Panic	Act Japan	Taito	Unreleased	October 1992	April 29, 1993
Jikū Senki Mu	Hudson Soft	Hudson Soft	September 13, 1991	Unreleased	Unreleased
Jimmy Connors Tennis; Jimmy Connors no Pro Tennis Tour ^{JP} Yannick Noah Tennis ^{EU}	NMS Software	Misawa ^{JP} Ubisoft ^{NA/EU}	July 23, 1993	May 1998	August 1993
Jinsei Game		Takara	June 23, 1995	Unreleased	Unreleased
Jinsei Game Densetsu		Takara	June 28, 1991	Unreleased	Unreleased
Joe & Mac; Joe & Mac: Caveman Ninja ^{EU}	MotiveTime	Data East ^{NA} Elite Systems ^{EU}	Unreleased	June 1993	September 23, 1993
Jordan vs. Bird: One on One; Michael Jordan: One on One ^{JP}	Imagineering	Electronic Arts ^{NA/EU} Electronic Arts Victor ^{JP}	July 16, 1993	February 1992	May 1992
Judge Dredd	Probe Entertainment Limited	Acclaim ^{NA/EU} Acclaim Japan ^{JP}	October 27, 1995	June 1995	August 24, 1995
The Jungle Book	Eurocom	Virgin Interactive Entertainment	Unreleased	August 1994	August 25, 1994
Jungle no Ōja Tar-chan	Sun L	Bandai	July 29, 1994	Unreleased	Unreleased
Jungle Strike	Ocean	Malibu Games ^{NA} Ocean ^{EU}	Unreleased	June 1995	April 1995
Jungle Wars	Atelier Double	Pony Canyon	June 21, 1991	Unreleased	Unreleased
Jurassic Park	Ocean	Ocean	Unreleased	August 1993	December 16, 1993
Jurassic Park Part 2: The Chaos Continues	Ocean	Ocean	Unreleased	December 1994	January 1995
Kaeru no Tame ni Kane wa Naru	Intelligent Systems	Nintendo	September 14, 1992	Unreleased	Unreleased
Kaijū-ō Godzilla		Bandai	December 17, 1993	Unreleased	Unreleased
Kaisen Game: Navy Blue 90	Use Corporation	Use Corporation	December 7, 1990	Unreleased	Unreleased
Kamen Rider SD: Hashire! Mighty Riders		Yutaka	August 20, 1993	Unreleased	Unreleased
Kandume Monsters		I'Max	March 27, 1998	Unreleased	Unreleased
Karakuri Kengō Den Musashi Lord	TOSE	Yutaka	April 27, 1991	Unreleased	Unreleased
Karamuchō no Daijiken	Freeqsoft	Starfish	December 19, 1997	Unreleased	Unreleased
Kaseki Sōsei Reborn	Freeqsoft	Starfish	July 17, 1998	Unreleased	Unreleased
Kachiuma Yosō Keiba Kizoku		King Records	August 27, 1993	Unreleased	Unreleased
Kachiuma Yosō Keiba Kizoku EX '94		King Records	July 29, 1994	Unreleased	Unreleased
Kachiuma Yosō Keiba Kizoku EX '95		King Records	April 14, 1995	Unreleased	Unreleased
Kattobi Road	Now Production	Namco	October 8, 1993	Unreleased	Unreleased
Keitai Keiba Eight Special		Imagineer	November 18, 1994	Unreleased	Unreleased
Ken Griffey, Jr. Presents Major League Baseball	Software Creations	Nintendo	Unreleased	July 1997	October 1997
Kenyū Densetsu Yaiba		Banpresto	March 25, 1994	Unreleased	Unreleased
Kibihara Hinshutsu Eibunpō: Gohō Mondai 1000	Sun-Tec	Imagineer	April 22, 1998	Unreleased	Unreleased
Kid Dracula; Akumajō Special: Boku Dracula-kun ^{JP}	Konami	Konami	January 3, 1993	March 1993	March 1993
Kid Icarus: Of Myths and Monsters	Nintendo R&D1; TOSE	Nintendo	Unreleased	November 1991	May 21, 1992
Kikō Keisatsu Metal Jack	KID	Takara	January 8, 1992	Unreleased	Unreleased
Killer Instinct	Rare	Nintendo	Unreleased	November 1995	December 14, 1995
The King of Fighters '95; Nettō The King of Fighters '95 ^{JP}	Gaibran	Takara ^{JP} Nintendo ^{NA} Laguna ^{EU}	April 26, 1996	February 1997	August 1996
The King of Fighters: Heat of Battle; Nettō The King of Fighters '96 ^{JP}	Gaibran	Takara ^{JP} Laguna ^{EU}	August 8, 1997	Unreleased	July 1998
Kingdom Crusade; The Legend of Prince Valiant ^{EU}	Sculptured Software	Ocean ^{EU} Electro Brain ^{NA}	Unreleased	November 1992	November 1992
Kingyo Chūihō! 2 Gyopichan o Sagase!	KID	B-AI	November 27, 1992	Unreleased	Unreleased
Kingyo Chūihō! Wapiko no Waku Waku Stamp Rally!	Tom Create	Yutaka	December 14, 1991	Unreleased	Unreleased
Kininkō Maroku Oni	Winkysoft	Banpresto	December 8, 1990	Unreleased	Unreleased
Kinnikuman: The Dream Match		Yutaka	September 12, 1992	Unreleased	Unreleased
Kirby's Block Ball	TOSE; Nintendo R&D1	Nintendo	December 14, 1995	May 13, 1996	August 29, 1996
Kirby's Dream Land	HAL Laboratory	Nintendo	April 24, 1992	August 1992	August 3, 1992
Kirby's Dream Land 2	HAL Laboratory	Nintendo	March 21, 1995	May 1995	July 31, 1995
Kirby's Pinball Land	HAL Laboratory	Nintendo	November 27, 1993	November 1993	August 25, 1994
Kirby's Star Stacker	HAL Laboratory	Nintendo	January 25, 1997	April 1997	August 28, 1997
Kitchen Panic	Bits Laboratory	Coconuts Japan	May 10, 1991	Unreleased	Unreleased
Kiteretsu Daihyakka: Bōken Ōedo Juraki		Video System	July 15, 1994	Unreleased	Unreleased
Kizuchida Quiz da Gen-San Da!	Tamtex	Irem	December 18, 1992	Unreleased	Unreleased
Klax (Hudson)	Hudson Soft	Hudson Soft	December 14, 1990	Unreleased	Unreleased
Klax (Mindscape)	Eastridge Technology	Mindscape	Unreleased	July 1991	Unreleased
Knight Quest	Lenar	Taito	September 13, 1991	July 1992	Unreleased
Koi Wa Kakehiki	Graphic Research	Pony Canyon	July 21, 1991	Unreleased	Unreleased
Konami GB Collection Vol.1	TOSE	Konami	September 25, 1997	Unreleased	Unreleased
Konami GB Collection Vol.2	TOSE	Konami	December 11, 1997	Unreleased	Unreleased
Konami GB Collection Vol.3	TOSE	Konami	February 19, 1998	Unreleased	Unreleased
Konami GB Collection Vol.4	TOSE	Konami	March 19, 1998	Unreleased	Unreleased
Konchū Hakase	Ocarina System	J-Wing	August 28, 1998	Unreleased	Unreleased
Koro Dice	A-Wave	King Records	December 7, 1990	Unreleased	Unreleased
Kōkiatsu Boy	KCE Shinjuku	Konami	July 2, 1998	Unreleased	Unreleased
Kōkō Nyūshideru Jun: Chugaku Eijukugo 350	C-Lab	Imagineer	July 25, 1997	Unreleased	Unreleased
Kōkō Nyūshideru Jun: Chugaku Eitango 1700	C-Lab	Imagineer	June 27, 1997	Unreleased	Unreleased
Kōkō Nyūshideru Jun: Kanji Mondai no Seifuku	C-Lab	Imagineer	August 29, 1997	Unreleased	Unreleased
Kōkō Nyūshideru Jun: Rekishi Nendai Anki Point 240	C-Lab	Imagineer	September 26, 1997	Unreleased	Unreleased
Kōkō Nyūshideru Jun: Rika Anki Point 250	C-Lab	Imagineer	October 1, 1997	Unreleased	Unreleased
Krusty's Fun House; Krusty World ^{JP}	Audiogenic	Acclaim ^{NA/EU} Acclaim Japan ^{JP}	July 29, 1994	January 1993	October 27, 1994
Kuma no Pūtarō: Takara Sagashi da Ooiri Game Battle!	Eleca	Takara	February 29, 1996	Unreleased	Unreleased
Kung-Fu Master; Spartan X ^{JP}	Irem	Irem ^{JP/NA} Nintendo ^{EU}	December 11, 1990	February 1991	December 5, 1991
Kūsō Kagaku Sekai Gulliver Boy: Kūsō Kagaku Puzzle – Puritto Pon		Bandai	April 28, 1995	Unreleased	Unreleased
Kwirk; Puzzle Boy ^{JP}	Atlus	Atlus ^{JP} Acclaim ^{NA} Nintendo ^{EU}	November 24, 1989	March 1990	December 7, 1990
Lamborghini American Challenge	Titus Software	Titus Software	Unreleased	April 1994	December 1993
Last Action Hero	Bits Studios	Sony Imagesoft	Unreleased	October 1993	October 1993
The Lawnmower Man; Virtual Wars ^{JP}	The Sales Curve	The Sales Curve ^{EU} Coconuts Japan ^{JP}	February 11, 1994	Unreleased	November 1993
Lazlos' Leap; Solitaire ^{JP}	Hect	Hect ^{JP} DTMC ^{NA}	June 26, 1992	October 1992	Unreleased
Legend: Ashita e no Tsubasa		Quest	May 31, 1991	Unreleased	Unreleased
Legend of the River King; Kawa no Nushi Tsuri 3 ^{JP}	TOSE	Victor Interactive Software ^{JP} Natsume Inc. ^{NA}	September 19, 1997	August 1998	Unreleased
The Legend of Zelda: Link's Awakening	Nintendo EAD	Nintendo	June 6, 1993	August 6, 1993	November 18, 1993
Lemmings	Ocean	Imagineer ^{JP} Ocean ^{NA/EU}	September 23, 1993	August 1994	January 1993
Lemmings 2: The Tribes	DMA Design	Psygnosis	Unreleased	Unreleased	November 1994
Lethal Weapon	Eurocom	Ocean	Unreleased	April 1993	July 1993
Lingo	PCSL Software	Altron	Unreleased	Unreleased	1994
The Lion King	Dark Technologies	Virgin Interactive Entertainment	Unreleased	April 1995	March 30, 1995
Little Master 2: Raikō no Kishi	Zener Works	Tokuma Shoten	March 27, 1992	Unreleased	Unreleased
Little Master: Likebahn no Densetsu	Zener Works	Tokuma Shoten	April 19, 1991	Unreleased	Unreleased
The Little Mermaid	Great	Capcom	Unreleased	February 1993	June 23, 1994
Lock 'n' Chase	Data East	Data East	May 11, 1990	July 1990	December 1996
Looney Tunes; Looney Tunes: Bugs Bunny to Yukai na Nakama Tachi ^{JP}	Sunsoft	Sunsoft	December 22, 1992	October 1992	December 1992
Loopz	Argonaut Games	Mindscape	March 15, 1991	March 1991	March 1992
The Lost World: Jurassic Park; Le Monde Perdu: Jurassic Park ^{EU/FR}	Torus Games	THQ	Unreleased	December 1997	December 1997
Lucky Luke	Bit Managers	Infogrames	Unreleased	Unreleased	June 24, 1997
Lucle	Vic Tokai	Vic Tokai ^{JP} Nintendo ^{EU}	March 25, 1994	Unreleased	November 1994
Lunar Lander		Pack-In-Video	September 21, 1990	Unreleased	Unreleased
Mach Go Go Go	TOSE	Tomy	August 8, 1997	Unreleased	Unreleased
Madden '95	Halestorm	Malibu Games	Unreleased	November 1994	November 1994
Madden '96	Halestorm	Black Pearl Software	Unreleased	October 1995	November 1995
Madden '97	Tiertex Design Studios	Black Pearl Software	Unreleased	November 1996	Unreleased
Magical Taruruto-kun	TOSE	Bandai	June 15, 1991	Unreleased	Unreleased
Magical Taruruto-kun 2: Rivar Zone Panic!!	Tom Create	Bandai	July 10, 1992	Unreleased	Unreleased
Magnetic Soccer	Nintendo	Nintendo	Unreleased	Unreleased	August 1992
Mahō Kishi Rayearth	Pandora Box	Tomy	June 2, 1995	Unreleased	Unreleased
Mahō Kishi Rayearth 2nd: The Missing Colors	Pandora Box	Tomy	October 27, 1995	Unreleased	Unreleased
Mahōjin GuruGuru: Yūsha to Kukuri no Daibōken	KID	Takara	April 28, 1995	Unreleased	Unreleased
Makai-Mura Gaiden: The Demon Darkness	Sun L	Capcom	April 16, 1993	Cancelled	Unreleased
Malibu Beach Volleyball; Seaside Volley ^{JP}	TOSE	Tonkin House ^{JP} Activision ^{NA}	October 31, 1989	March 1990	Unreleased
Marble Madness	Eastridge Technology	Mindscape	Unreleased	May 1991	May 21, 1992
Marchen Club		Naxat Soft	September 25, 1992	Unreleased	Unreleased
Mario's Picross	Jupiter; Ape	Nintendo	March 14, 1995	March 1995	July 27, 1995
Marmalade Boy	Tom Create	Bandai	January 27, 1995	Unreleased	Unreleased
Maru's Mission; Oira Jajamaru! Sekai Daiboken ^{JP}	TOSE	Jaleco	September 28, 1990	March 1991	Unreleased
Masakari Densetsu: Kintarō Action-Hen	TOSE	Tonkin House	August 7, 1992	Unreleased	Unreleased
Masakari Densetsu: Kintaro RPG-Hen	Tomcat System	Tonkin House	October 28, 1994	Unreleased	Unreleased
Master Karateka	TOSE	Bandai Shinsei	December 28, 1989	Unreleased	Unreleased
Matthias Sammer Soccer; J-League Big Wave Soccer ^{JP}	Jupiter Corporation	Tomy ^{JP} Laguna ^{EU}	November 24, 1995	Unreleased	May 1997
Maui Mallard in Cold Shadow	Bonsai Entertainment	Sunsoft	Unreleased	August 1998	Unreleased
Die Maus	Bit Managers	Infogrames	Unreleased	Unreleased	December 1997
Max; Rubble Saver II ^{JP}	A-Wave	King Records ^{JP} Infogrames ^{EU}	March 6, 1992	Unreleased	1992
Medarot: Kabuto Version	Natsume Co., Ltd.	Imagineer	November 28, 1997	Unreleased	Unreleased
Medarot: Kuwagata Version	Natsume Co., Ltd.	Imagineer	November 28, 1997	Unreleased	Unreleased
Medarot Parts Collection	Natsume Co., Ltd.	Imagineer	March 20, 1998	Unreleased	Unreleased
Medarot Parts Collection 2	Natsume Co., Ltd.	Imagineer	May 29, 1998	Unreleased	Unreleased
Mega Man II	Thinking Rabbit	Capcom ^{JP/NA} Nintendo ^{EU}	December 20, 1991	February 1992	December 17, 1992
Mega Man III	Minakuchi Engineering	Capcom ^{JP/NA} Nintendo ^{EU}	December 11, 1992	December 1992	December 16, 1993
Mega Man IV	Minakuchi Engineering	Capcom	October 29, 1993	December 1993	February 22, 1996
Mega Man V	Minakuchi Engineering	Capcom	July 22, 1994	September 1994	April 25, 1996
Mega Man: Dr. Wily's Revenge	Minakuchi Engineering	Capcom ^{JP/NA} Nintendo ^{EU}	July 26, 1991	December 1991	June 11, 1992
Megalit	ASCII Corporation	Asmik Ace Entertainment ^{JP} Takara ^{NA/EU}	August 9, 1991	December 1992	March 1993
Megami Tensei Gaiden: Last Bible	Multimedia Intelligence Transfer	Atlus	December 25, 1992	Unreleased	Unreleased
Megami Tensei Gaiden: Last Bible II	Multimedia Intelligence Transfer	Atlus	November 19, 1993	Unreleased	Unreleased
Meitantei Conan: Chika Yūenchi Satsujin Jiken	Act Japan	Bandai	December 27, 1996	Unreleased	Unreleased
Meitantei Conan: Giwaku no Gōka Ressha		Bandai	August 7, 1998	Unreleased	Unreleased
Mercenary Force; Tenjin Kaisen ^{JP}	Lenar	Meldac ^{JP/NA} Nintendo ^{EU}	April 27, 1990	October 1990	December 1991
Metal Masters	Bit Managers	Electro Brain	Unreleased	December 1993	Unreleased
Metroid II: Return of Samus	Nintendo R&D1	Nintendo	January 21, 1992	November 1991	May 21, 1992
Mickey Mouse: Magic Wands! Mickey Mouse V: Mahō no Stick ^{JP}	Kotobuki Systems	Kemco ^{JP} Nintendo ^{NA/EU}	December 22, 1993	May 1998	October 1995
Mickey's Dangerous Chase; Mickey's Chase ^{JP}	Now Production	Capcom ^{NA/EU} Kemco ^{JP}	December 18, 1992	May 1991	August 27, 1992
Mickey's Ultimate Challenge	Designer Software	Hi Tech Expressions	Unreleased	May 1994	August 1994
Micro Machines	Mindscape	Ocean	Unreleased	January 1995	January 1995
Micro Machines 2: Turbo Tournament	Codemasters	Ocean	Unreleased	Unreleased	December 1995
Midori no Makibaō	TOSE	Tomy	December 21, 1996	Unreleased	December 1995
Mighty Morphin Power Rangers	Tom Create	Bandai	Unreleased	August 1994	August 1994
Mighty Morphin Power Rangers: The Movie	Tom Create	Bandai	Unreleased	August 1995	December 1995
Mikeneko Homuzu no Kishido		ASK Kodansha	February 15, 1991	Unreleased	Unreleased
Milon's Secret Castle; Milon no Meikyū Kumikyoku ^{JP}	Make Software	Hudson Soft	March 26, 1993	March 1993	January 1995
Miner 2049er	Eastridge Technology	Mindscape	Unreleased	October 1992	Unreleased
Minesweeper	Arc System Works	Pack-In-Video	December 13, 1991	Unreleased	Unreleased
Mini 4 Boy		J-Wing	December 27, 1996	Unreleased	Unreleased
Mini 4 Boy II		J-Wing	September 26, 1997	Unreleased	Unreleased
Mini-Putt		A-Wave	April 26, 1991	Unreleased	Unreleased
Mini-Yonku GB: Let's & Go!!	Jupiter Corporation	ASCII Corporation	May 23, 1997	Unreleased	Unreleased
Mini-Yonku GB: Let's & Go!! All-Star Battle MAX	Jupiter Corporation	ASCII Corporation	June 19, 1998	Unreleased	Unreleased
Miracle Adventure of Esparks	Sun L	Tomy	December 11, 1992	Unreleased	Unreleased
Missile Command	The Code Monkeys	Accolade	Unreleased	March 1992	October 1992
Mogu Mogu Gombo: Harukanaru Chō Ryōri Densetsu		Bandai	June 16, 1995	Unreleased	Unreleased
Mogura de Pon!		Athena	April 15, 1994	Unreleased	Unreleased
Mole Mania	Pax Softnica; Nintendo EAD	Nintendo	July 21, 1996	February 1997	February 1997
Momotaro Collection	A.I	Hudson Soft	August 9, 1996	Unreleased	Unreleased
Momotaro Collection 2	A.I	Hudson Soft	December 6, 1996	Unreleased	Unreleased
Momotaro Dengeki: Momotaro Thunderbolt	Now Production	Hudson Soft	August 8, 1993	Unreleased	Unreleased
Momotaro Dengeki 2: Momotaro Thunderbolt	Now Production	Hudson Soft	December 16, 1994	Unreleased	Unreleased
Momotaro Densetsu Gaiden	Hudson Soft	Hudson Soft	December 26, 1991	Unreleased	Unreleased
Momotarō Dentetsu Jr.: Zenkoku Ramen Meguri no Maki	Make Software	Hudson Soft	July 31, 1998	Unreleased	Unreleased
Money Idol Exchanger	Face	Athena	August 29, 1997	Unreleased	Unreleased
Monopoly	Sculptured Software	Tomy ^{JP} Parker Brothers ^{NA} Konami ^{EU}	December 20, 1991	December 1991	September 1998
Monster * Race		Koei	March 6, 1998	Unreleased	Unreleased
Monster * Race Okawari		Koei	October 2, 1998	Unreleased	Unreleased
Monster Maker		SOFEL	December 22, 1990	Unreleased	Unreleased
Monster Maker 2: Uru no Hiten		SOFEL	March 19, 1993	Unreleased	Unreleased
Monster Maker: Barcode Saga	Jorudan	Namco	August 10, 1993	Unreleased	Unreleased
Monster Max	Rare	Titus Software	Unreleased	Unreleased	August 1994
Monster Truck	Another	Varie	October 19, 1990	Unreleased	Unreleased
Monster Truck Wars	Gremlin Graphics	Acclaim	Unreleased	November 1994	November 1994
Montezuma's Return	Utopia Technologies	Take-Two Interactive	Unreleased	Unreleased	October 1998
Mortal Kombat; Mortal Kombat: Shinken Kōrin Densetsu ^{JP}	Probe Entertainment Limited	Acclaim ^{NA/EU} Acclaim Japan ^{JP}	December 24, 1993	September 13, 1993	September 13, 1993
Mortal Kombat 3	Software Creations	Williams	Unreleased	October 13, 1995	October 1995
Mortal Kombat II; Mortal Kombat II: Kyūkyoku Shinken ^{JP}	Probe Entertainment Limited	Acclaim ^{NA/EU} Acclaim Japan ^{JP}	November 11, 1994	September 9, 1994	September 9, 1994
Motocross Maniacs	Konami	Konami ^{JP/EU} Ultra Games ^{NA}	September 20, 1989	January 1990	April 1991
Mouse Trap Hotel	Imagineering	Electro Brain	Unreleased	October 1992	Unreleased
Mr. Chin's Gourmet Paradise	Romstar	Romstar	Cancelled	October 1990	Unreleased
Mr. Do!	Ocean	Ocean	Unreleased	November 1992	May 1992
Mr. Go no Baken Tekichū Sube		Taito	April 1, 1994	Unreleased	Unreleased
Mr. Nutz	Ocean	Ocean	Unreleased	Unreleased	December 1995
Ms. Pac-Man	Namco	Namco	Unreleased	October 1993	April 1994
Muhammad Ali Heavyweight Boxing	Gremlin Graphics	Virgin Interactive Entertainment	Unreleased	July 1993	November 1993
Mulan	Tiertex Design Studios	THQ	Unreleased	October 1998	December 11, 1998
Mysterium	Maxis	Asmik Corporation of America ^{NA} VAP ^{JP}	July 23, 1993	July 1991	Unreleased
Mystical Ninja Starring Goemon	Konami Computer Entertainment Nagoya	Konami	December 4, 1997	April 1998	April 9, 1998
Nada Asatarō & Kojima Takeo no Jissen Mahjong Kyōshitsu		Gaps	December 25, 1998	Unreleased	Unreleased
Nada Asatarō no Powerful Mahjong: Tsugi no Itte 100 Dai	Affect	Yojigen	December 23, 1994	Unreleased	Unreleased
Nail 'n' Scale; Dragon Tail ^{JP}	Bit2	I'Max ^{JP} Data East ^{NA/EU}	December 13, 1990	April 1992	May 1992
Namco Classic	TOSE	Namco	December 3, 1991	Unreleased	Unreleased
Namco Gallery Vol. 1	TOSE	Namco	July 21, 1996	Unreleased	Unreleased
Namco Gallery Vol. 2	TOSE	Namco	November 29, 1996	Unreleased	Unreleased
Namco Gallery Vol. 3	TOSE	Namco	July 25, 1997	Unreleased	Unreleased
Nangoku Shōnen Papuwa-kun: Ganmadan no Yabō	Daft	Enix	March 25, 1994	Unreleased	Unreleased
Nanonote		Konami	August 7, 1992	Unreleased	Unreleased
Navy Blue 98	Use Corporation	Shōei System	February 20, 1998	Unreleased	Unreleased
Navy SEALs	Ocean	Ocean	Unreleased	September 1991	September 1991
NBA All-Star Challenge	Beam Software	LJN	Unreleased	February 1991	September 1991
NBA All-Star Challenge 2	Beam Software	LJN ^{NA/EU} Acclaim Japan ^{JP}	April 16, 1993	May 1992	February 1993
NBA Jam	Beam Software	Acclaim	Unreleased	November 1994	November 24, 1994
NBA Jam: Tournament Edition	Torus Games	Acclaim ^{NA/EU} Acclaim Japan ^{JP}	October 27, 1995	June 1995	June 29, 1995
NBA Live 96	Tiertex Design Studios	Black Pearl Software	Unreleased	March 1996	January 22, 1996
Nectaris GB	Tam Tam	Hudson Soft	February 27, 1998	Unreleased	Unreleased
Nekketsu Kōkō Dodgeball Bu: Kyōteki! Dodge Soldier no Maki	Million Corp.	Technōs Japan	November 8, 1991	Unreleased	Unreleased
Nekketsu! Beach Volley dayo Kunio-Kun	Million Corp.	Technōs Japan	July 29, 1994	Unreleased	Unreleased
Nekojara Monogatari		Kemco	December 14, 1990	Unreleased	Unreleased
Nemesis	Konami	Konami ^{JP/EU} Ultra Games ^{NA}	February 23, 1990	April 1990	January 30, 1992
Nettō Garō Densetsu 2: Aratanaru Tatakai	Sun L	Takara	July 29, 1994	Unreleased	Unreleased
Nettō Real Bout Garō Densetsu Special	Gaibrain	Takara	March 27, 1998	Unreleased	Unreleased
Nettō Samurai Spirits: Zankuro Musōken	Betop	Takara	August 23, 1996	Unreleased	Unreleased
The New Chessmaster	Park Place Productions	Hi Tech Expressions ^{NA} Altron ^{JP}	January 30, 1998	April 1993	Unreleased
NFL Football	Konami	Konami	Unreleased	April 1990	Unreleased
NFL Quarterback Club	Beam Software	LJN	Unreleased	November 1993	February 1994
NFL Quarterback Club 96	Condor	Acclaim	Unreleased	October 27, 1995	October 1995
NFL Quarterback Club II; NFL Quarterback Club '95 ^{JP}	Condor	LJN ^{NA/EU} Acclaim Japan ^{JP}	March 17, 1995	March 1995	March 1995
NHL 96	Probe Entertainment Limited	Black Pearl Software	Unreleased	July 1996	March 28, 1996
NHL Hockey 95	Malibu Games	Malibu Games	Unreleased	June 1995	September 28, 1995
Nichibutsu Mahjong: Yoshimoto Gekijō	Nichibutsu	Nichibutsu	November 18, 1994	Unreleased	Unreleased
Nigel Mansell's World Championship Racing	Gremlin Graphics	Nintendo ^{EU} GameTek ^{NA}	Unreleased	August 1993	August 1993
Nihonshi Target 201	C-Lab	Imagineer	December 13, 1996	Unreleased	Unreleased
Nikkan Berutomo Club		I'Max	June 26, 1998	Unreleased	Unreleased
Ninja Boy; Super Chinese Land ^{JP}	Culture Brain	Culture Brain	April 20, 1990	November 1990	July 1992
Ninja Boy 2 Super Chinese Land 2 ^{JP}	Culture Brain	Culture Brain	November 29, 1991	April 1993	April 1993
Ninja Gaiden Shadow; Ninja Ryūkenden GB: Matenrō Kessen ^{JP} Shadow Warriors: Ninja Gaiden ^{EU}	Natsume Co., Ltd.	Tecmo	December 13, 1991	December 1991	June 11, 1992
Ninja Taro; Sengoku Ninja-Kun ^{JP}	NMK	UPL ^{JP} American Sammy ^{NA}	March 8, 1991	September 1992	Unreleased
Ninku	TOSE	Tomy	July 14, 1995	Unreleased	Unreleased
Ninku Dai-2-Tama: Ninku Sensōhen	TOSE	Tomy	November 24, 1995	Unreleased	Unreleased
Nintama Rantarō GB		Culture Brain	December 27, 1995	Unreleased	Unreleased
Nintama Rantarō GB: Eawase Challenge Puzzle		Culture Brain	June 19, 1998	Unreleased	Unreleased
Nintendo World Cup; Nekketsu Koko Soccer Bu: World Cup Hen ^{JP}	Technōs Japan	Technōs Japan ^{JP} Nintendo ^{NA/EU}	April 26, 1991	June 1991	July 18, 1991
Nippon Daihyō Team: Eikō no Eleven	Jupiter Corporation	Tomy	May 22, 1998	Unreleased	Unreleased
Nobunaga's Ambition; Nobunaga no Yabō Game Boy Ban ^{JP}	Koei	Koei	October 10, 1990	March 1991	Unreleased
Nontan no Issho: Kuru Kuru Puzzle	Game Freak	Victor Interactive Software	April 28, 1994	Unreleased	Unreleased
Noobow	Irem	Irem	December 11, 1992	Unreleased	Unreleased
Oddworld Adventures	Saffire	GT Interactive	Unreleased	December 1998	December 1998
Olympic Summer Games: Atlanta 1996	Tiertex Design Studios	Black Pearl Software	Unreleased	June 1996	June 27, 1996
Oni II: Innin Densetsu	Pandora Box	Banpresto	February 28, 1992	Unreleased	Unreleased
Oni III: Kuro no Hakaishin	Pandora Box	Banpresto	February 26, 1993	Unreleased	Unreleased
Oni IV: Kishin no Ketsuzoku	Pandora Box	Banpresto	March 11, 1994	Unreleased	Unreleased
Oni V: Innin no Tsugumono	Pandora Box	Banpresto	March 24, 1995	Unreleased	Unreleased
Onigashima Pachinko-Ten	Marionette	Coconuts Japan	February 8, 1991	Unreleased	Unreleased
Operation C Contra ^{JP} Probotector ^{EU}	Konami	Konami ^{JP} Ultra Games ^{NA} Palcom Software ^{EU}	January 8, 1991	February 1991	May 21, 1992
Othello		Kawada ^{JP} Nintendo ^{EU}	February 9, 1990	Unreleased	October 1991
Othello World	Dice	Tsukuda Original	September 30, 1994	Unreleased	Unreleased
Otogi Banashi Taisen	Sun L	Yojigen	August 4, 1995	Unreleased	Unreleased
Ottos Ottifanten: Baby Brunos's Nightmare	Bit Managers	Infogrames	Unreleased	Unreleased	October 1998
Out of Gas	Realtime Associates	FCI	Unreleased	August 1992	Unreleased
Oyatsu Quiz Mogumogu Q		Starfish	September 26, 1997	Unreleased	Unreleased
Pac-Attack; Pac-Panic ^{JP/EU}	Now Production	Namco	December 9, 1994	December 1994	September 1995
Pac-In-Time	Kalisto Entertainment	Namco ^{JP/NA} Nintendo ^{EU}	January 3, 1995	February 1995	January 1995
Pac-Man	Namco	Namco	November 16, 1990	April 1991	March 19, 1992
Pachi-Slot Hisshō Guide GB		Magifact	January 27, 1995	Unreleased	Unreleased
Pachi-Slot Kids		Coconuts Japan	June 18, 1993	Unreleased	Unreleased
Pachi-Slot Kids 2	Aisystem Tokyo	Coconuts Japan	June 10, 1994	Unreleased	Unreleased
Pachi-Slot Kids 3	Aisystem Tokyo	Coconuts Japan	March 24, 1995	Unreleased	Unreleased
Pachi-Slot World Cup '94		I'MAX	July 29, 1994	Unreleased	Unreleased
Pachinko CR Daiku no Gen-San GB		Telenet Japan	March 13, 1998	Unreleased	Unreleased
Pachinko Data Card: Chō Ataru-kun		Boss Communications	January 28, 1999	Unreleased	Unreleased
Pachinko Kaguya Hime	Marionette	Coconuts Japan	October 9, 1992	Unreleased	Unreleased
Pachinko Monogatari Gaiden	Atelier Double	KSS	June 23, 1995	Unreleased	Unreleased
Pachinko Seiyūki	Marionette	Coconuts Japan	December 13, 1991	Unreleased	Unreleased
Pachinko Time	Marionette	Coconuts Japan	December 8, 1989	Unreleased	Unreleased
Pachiokun	Soft Machine	Coconuts Japan	November 19, 1993	Unreleased	Unreleased
Pachiokun 2	Aisystem Tokyo	Coconuts Japan	November 25, 1994	Unreleased	Unreleased
Pachiokun 3	Aisystem Tokyo	Coconuts Japan	April 28, 1995	Unreleased	Unreleased
Pachiokun Puzzle Castle	Marionette	Coconuts Japan	April 22, 1994	Unreleased	Unreleased
The Pagemaster	Probe Entertainment Limited	Fox Interactive ^{NA} Virgin Interactive Entertainment ^{EU}	Unreleased	November 1994	November 1994
Painter Momopie		Sigma Enterprises	December 7, 1990	Unreleased	Unreleased
Palamedes	Natsu System	Hot B ^{JP} Takara ^{EU}	October 12, 1990	Unreleased	May 1992
Panel Action Bingo	Locus	FCI	Unreleased	November 1993	Unreleased
Panel no Ninja Kesamaru	Epoch & SAS Sakata	Epoch	May 2, 1992	Unreleased	Unreleased
Paperboy	Eastridge Technology	Mindscape	Unreleased	July 1990	October 31, 1991
Paperboy 2	Eastridge Technology	Mindscape	Unreleased	April 1992	June 1992
Parasol Henbē	Epoch & SAS Sakata	Epoch	November 16, 1990	Unreleased	Unreleased
Parasol Stars: Rainbow Islands II	Ocean	Ocean	Unreleased	Unreleased	October 1992
Parodius; Parodius da! ^{JP}	Konami	Konami ^{JP} Palcom Software ^{EU}	April 5, 1991	Unreleased	September 1992
Patlabor: The Mobile Police		Yutaka	August 25, 1990	Unreleased	Unreleased
Peetan	Inter State	Kaneko	December 27, 1991	Unreleased	Unreleased
Peke to Poko no Daruman Busters	Birthday	Banpresto	August 3, 1991	Unreleased	Unreleased
Penguin Land	Atelier Double	Pony Canyon	March 21, 1990	Unreleased	Unreleased
Penguin Wars; Penguin-Kun Wars Vs. ^{JP} King of the Zoo ^{EU}	ASCII Corporation	ASCII Corporation ^{JP} Nexoft ^{NA} Nintendo ^{EU}	March 30, 1990	July 1990	December 1990
Penta Dragon	Japan Art Media	Yanoman	July 31, 1992	Unreleased	Unreleased
PGA European Tour	Unexpected Development	Malibu Games	Unreleased	April 1995	September 28, 1995
PGA Tour 96	Unexpected Development	Black Pearl Software	Unreleased	November 1995	January 25, 1996
Picross 2	Jupiter; Creatures Inc.	Nintendo	October 19, 1996	Unreleased	Unreleased
Pierre le Chef is... Out to Lunch	Mindscape	Mindscape	Unreleased	Unreleased	December 1993
Pinball Dreams	Spidersoft	GameTek	Unreleased	August 1993	November 1993
Pinball Fantasies	Spidersoft	GameTek	Unreleased	February 1995	July 27, 1997
Pinball Mania	Spidersoft	GameTek	Unreleased	Unreleased	January 1995
Revenge of the 'Gator; Pinball: Revenge of the 'Gator ^{EU}	HAL Laboratory	HAL Laboratory^{NA/JP} Nintendo ^{EU}	October 18, 1989	March 1990	January 31, 1991
Pingu: Sekai de Ichiban Genki na Penguin	Tom Create	B-AI	December 10, 1993	Unreleased	Unreleased
Pinocchio	NMS Software	Black Pearl Software ^{NA} Virgin Interactive Entertainment ^{EU}	Unreleased	October 1996	August 29, 1996
Pipe Dream	Bullet-Proof Software	Bullet-Proof Software	July 3, 1990	September 1990	Unreleased
Pit-Fighter	Eastridge Technology	THQ	Unreleased	June 1992	October 1992
Play Action Football	TOSE	Nintendo	Unreleased	December 1990	Unreleased
Pocahontas	Black Pearl Software	Black Pearl Software	Unreleased	April 1996	December 19, 1996
Pocket Bass Fishing		Bottom Up	April 24, 1998	Unreleased	Unreleased
Pocket Battle		Sigma Enterprises	April 28, 1992	Unreleased	Unreleased
Pocket Bomberman	Hudson Soft	Hudson Soft	December 12, 1997	Unreleased	January 1998
Pocket Densha		Coconuts Japan	October 30, 1998	Unreleased	Unreleased
Pocket Family GB	Outback	Hudson Soft	August 9, 1998	Unreleased	Unreleased
Pocket Golf		Bottom Up	September 25, 1998	Unreleased	Unreleased
Pocket Kanjirō	Jupiter Corporation	Shingakusha	January 10, 1998	Unreleased	Unreleased
Pocket Kyorochan	Jupiter Corporation	Tomy	February 27, 1998	Unreleased	Unreleased
Pocket Love	KID	KID	July 18, 1997	Unreleased	Unreleased
Pocket Love 2	KID	KID	March 13, 1998	Unreleased	Unreleased
Pocket Mahjong		Bottom Up	July 25, 1997	Unreleased	Unreleased
Pocket Monsters Midori	Game Freak	Nintendo	February 27, 1996	Unreleased	Unreleased
Pocket Puyo Puyo 2	Compile	Compile	December 13, 1996	Unreleased	Unreleased
Pocket Shogi		Bottom Up	September 11, 1998	Unreleased	Unreleased
Pocket Stadium		Atlus	December 14, 1990	Unreleased	Unreleased
Pokémon Blue Version	Game Freak	Nintendo	October 15, 1996	September 28, 1998	October 5, 1999
Pokémon Red Version	Game Freak	Nintendo	February 27, 1996	September 28, 1998	October 5, 1999
Pokémon Yellow Version: Special Pikachu Edition	Game Freak	Nintendo	September 12, 1998	October 19, 1999	June 16, 2000
Pokonyan! Yume no Daibōken		Toho	August 5, 1994	Unreleased	Unreleased
Ponta to Hinako no Chindōchū: Yūjō Hen		Naxat Soft	December 20, 1990	Unreleased	Unreleased
Pop'n TwinBee; TwinBee Da!! ^{JP}	Konami	Konami	October 12, 1990	Unreleased	March 1994
Popeye	Sigma Enterprises	Sigma Enterprises	April 20, 1990	Unreleased	Unreleased
Popeye 2	Copya Systems	Sigma Enterprises ^{JP} Activision ^{NA/EU}	November 22, 1991	October 1993	April 29, 1993
Populous; Populous Gaiden ^{JP}	Enigma Variations	Imagineer	May 28, 1993	Unreleased	April 1993
Power Mission	Graphic Research	VAP ^{JP} NTVIC ^{NA}	August 24, 1990	January 1991	Unreleased
Power Pro GB	KCE Nagoya	Konami	March 26, 1998	Unreleased	Unreleased
Power Racer; Head On ^{JP}	Graphic Research	Tecmo	December 7, 1990	December 1990	August 1991
Prehistorik Man; P-Man ^{JP}	Titus Software	Kemco ^{JP} Titus Software	December 22, 1995	January 1996	July 25, 1996
Pri Pri: Primitive Princess!		Sunsoft	December 12, 1990	Unreleased	Unreleased
Primal Rage	Probe Entertainment Limited	Time Warner Interactive	Unreleased	July 1995	July 1995
Prince of Persia	Broderbund	Virgin Interactive Entertainment ^{NA} NCS ^{JP} Mindscape ^{EU}	July 24, 1992	January 1992	January 28, 1993
Pro Mahjong Kiwame GB		Athena	December 23, 1994	Unreleased	Unreleased
Prophecy: The Viking Child	Imagitec Design	GameTek	Unreleased	July 1992	October 1993
The Punisher: The Ultimate Payback	Beam Software	Acclaim	Unreleased	July 1991	Unreleased
Purikura Pocket 2: Kareshi Kaizō Daisakusen		Atlus	November 29, 1997	Unreleased	Unreleased
Purikura Pocket 3: Talent Debut Daisakusen	Avit	Atlus	December 18, 1998	Unreleased	Unreleased
Purikura Pocket: Fukanzen Joshikōsei Manual		Atlus	October 17, 1997	Unreleased	Unreleased
Puyo Puyo	Winkysoft	Banpresto	July 31, 1994	Unreleased	Unreleased
Puzzle Nintama Rantarō GB		Culture Brain	November 1, 1996	Unreleased	Unreleased
Puzznic		Taito	July 31, 1990	Unreleased	Unreleased
Pyramids of Ra	MICROS	Matchbox	Unreleased	April 1993	Unreleased
QBillion	SETA Corporation	SETA Corporation	December 22, 1989	April 1990	Unreleased
Q*bert for Game Boy	Realtime Associates	Jaleco	January 14, 1992	February 1992	September 17, 1992
Qix	Minakuchi Engineering	Nintendo	April 13, 1990	May 1990	September 28, 1990
Quarth	Konami	Ultra Games	March 16, 1990	December 1990	Unreleased
Quiz Nihon Mukashi Banashi: Athena no Hatena	Athena	Athena	December 18, 1992	Unreleased	Unreleased
Quiz Sekai wa Show by Shōbai!!	Sun L	Takara	August 7, 1992	Unreleased	Unreleased
R-Type	Bits Studios	Irem	March 19, 1991	May 1991	November 21, 1991
R-Type II	Bits Studios	Irem	December 11, 1992	Cancelled	December 1992
Race Drivin'	Argonaut Games	THQ	Unreleased	January 1993	January 1993
Racing Damashii	Irem	Irem	February 28, 1991	Unreleased	Unreleased
Radar Mission	Nintendo R&D1; Pax Softnica	Nintendo	October 23, 1990	February 1991	September 19, 1991
Raging Fighter; Outburst ^{JP}	Konami	Konami	March 26, 1993	June 1993	June 1993
Rampart		Jaleco	October 30, 1992	1993	February 1993
Ranma ½: Kakugeki Mondō!!	Sun L	Banpresto	August 6, 1993	Unreleased	Unreleased
Ranma ½: Kakuren Bodesu Match		Banpresto	July 28, 1990	Unreleased	Unreleased
Ranma ½: Netsuretsu Kakutōhen		Banpresto	July 17, 1992	Unreleased	Unreleased
Ray-Thunder	Nichibutsu	Nichibutsu	February 8, 1991	Unreleased	Unreleased
The Real Ghostbusters; Mickey Mouse IV: Mahō no Labyrinth ^{JP} Garfield Labyrinth ^{EU}	Kotobuki Systems	Kemco ^{JP/EU} Activision ^{NA}	April 23, 1993	October 1993	September 1993
Reibun de Oboeru: Chūgaku Eitango 1132	Tomcat System	Imagineer	March 20, 1998	Unreleased	Unreleased
Reibun de Oboeru: Kyūkyoku no Kobun Tango	Tomcat System	Imagineer	December 25, 1998	Unreleased	Unreleased
The Ren & Stimpy Show: Space Cadet Adventures	Imagineering	THQ	Unreleased	November 1992	Unreleased
The Ren & Stimpy Show: Veediots!	Eastridge Technology	THQ	Unreleased	October 1993	December 1993
Renju Club: Gomoku Narabe	Natsu System	Hect	May 17, 1996	Unreleased	Unreleased
Rentaiō		Visit	September 16, 1994	Unreleased	Unreleased
Rats! Reservoir Rat ^{EU}	Tarantula Studios	Take-Two Interactive	Unreleased	December 14, 1998	October 1998
Riddick Bowe Boxing	Equilibrium	Extreme Entertainment Group ^{NA} GameTek ^{EU}	Unreleased	January 1994	October 1995
Ring Rage	Taito	Taito ^{JP} Natsume Inc. ^{NA}	January 29, 1993	April 1998	Unreleased
Road Rash	The Code Monkeys	Ocean	Unreleased	June 1994	November 1994
Roadster	TOSE	Tonkin House	October 19, 1990	Unreleased	Unreleased
Robin Hood: Prince of Thieves	Bits Studios	Virgin Interactive Entertainment	Unreleased	June 1993	May 19, 1993
RoboCop		Ocean ^{NA/EU} Epic/Sony Records ^{JP}	March 1, 1991	December 1990	August 1991
RoboCop 2	Painting by Numbers	Ocean ^{NA} Epic/Sony Records ^{JP}	March 19, 1992	November 1991	Unreleased
RoboCop Versus The Terminator	Unexpected Development	Interplay	Unreleased	August 1994	April 1995
Rock'n! Monster!!	Eleca	Hori	July 1, 1994	Unreleased	Unreleased
Rod Land; Yōsei Monogatari: RodLand ^{JP}	Eurocom	Jaleco ^{JP} Storm ^{EU}	May 21, 1993	Unreleased	April 1993
Roger Clemens' MVP Baseball; MVP Baseball ^{JP}	Sculptured Software	LJN ^{NA} Acclaim Japan ^{JP}	August 27, 1993	September 1992	Unreleased
Rolan's Curse; Velious: Roland no Majū ^{JP}	NMK	Sammy Corporation ^{JP} American Sammy ^{NA}	October 26, 1990	January 1991	Unreleased
Rolan's Curse 2 Velious II: Fukushū no Jashin ^{JP}	NMK	Sammy Corporation ^{JP} American Sammy ^{NA}	February 21, 1992	October 1992	Unreleased
The Rugrats Movie	Software Creations	THQ	Unreleased	December 1998	Unreleased
Sagaia	Act Japan	Taito	December 13, 1991	Unreleased	Unreleased
Saigo no Nindō: Ninja Spirit	Bits Studios	Irem	December 18, 1993	Unreleased	Unreleased
Saint Paradise		Bandai	November 13, 1992	Unreleased	Unreleased
Sakigake!! Otokojuku: Meikōshima Kessen		Yutaka	August 4, 1990	Unreleased	Unreleased
SameGame	Shimada Kikaku; A.I	Hudson Soft	April 25, 1997	Unreleased	Unreleased
Samurai Shodown; Nettō Samurai Spirits ^{JP}	Takara	Takara	June 30, 1994	November 1994	November 1994
Sangokushi Game Boy Han	Koei	Koei	September 30, 1992	Unreleased	Unreleased
Sanrio Carnival	Scitron & Art	Character Soft	May 11, 1991	Unreleased	Unreleased
Sanrio Carnival 2		Character Soft	March 19, 1993	Unreleased	Unreleased
Sanrio Uranai Party		Imagineer	December 5, 1997	Unreleased	Unreleased
Satoru Nakajima F-1 Hero GB World Championship '91	Natsu System	Varie	December 27, 1991	Unreleased	Unreleased
Scotland Yard	Shōei System	Toei Animation	December 7, 1990	Unreleased	Unreleased
SD Gundam Gaiden: Lacroan Heroes	Human Entertainment	Bandai	October 6, 1990	Unreleased	Unreleased
SD Gundam: SD Sengokuden: Kunitori Monogatari		Bandai	March 24, 1990	Unreleased	Unreleased
SD Gundam: Sengokuden 2: Tenka Tōitsuhen		Bandai	January 18, 1992	Unreleased	Unreleased
SD Gundam: SD Sengokuden 3: Chijō Saikyōhen		Bandai	September 4, 1992	Unreleased	Unreleased
SD Hiryū no Ken Gaiden	Culture Brain	Culture Brain	April 14, 1995	Unreleased	Unreleased
SD Hiryū no Ken Gaiden 2	Culture Brain	Culture Brain	September 27, 1996	Unreleased	Unreleased
SD Lupin Sansei: Kinko Yaburi Daisakusen	Nova Games	Banpresto	April 13, 1990	Unreleased	Unreleased
Sea Battle ^{EU} Bataille Navale ^{FR} Schiffe Versenken ^{DE}	Bit Managers	Infogrames	Unreleased	Unreleased	November 1998
seaQuest DSV	Unexpected Development	Malibu Games	Unreleased	November 1994	November 1994
Selection I & II: Erabareshi Mono & Ankoku no Fūin	Kemco	Kemco	May 1, 1998	Unreleased	Unreleased
Sensible Soccer: European Champions	Sensible Software	Sony Imagesoft	Unreleased	Unreleased	February 1994
Serpent; Kakomunja ^{JP}	Dual	Naxat Soft ^{JP} Taxan ^{NA}	April 6, 1990	November 1990	Unreleased
Shanghai	HAL Laboratory	HAL Laboratory	July 28, 1989	June 1990	Unreleased
Shanghai Pocket	Sunsoft	Sunsoft	August 6, 1998	Unreleased	Unreleased
Shaq Fu	Unexpected Development	Black Pearl Software	Unreleased	October 1995	Unreleased
Shikakui Atama o Maruku Suru		Imagineer	June 26, 1998	Unreleased	Unreleased
Shikakui Atama o Maruku Suru: Jōshiki no Sho		Imagineer	March 17, 2000	Unreleased	Unreleased
Shikakui Atama o Maruku Suru: Kanji no Tatsujin		Imagineer	March 30, 2001	Unreleased	Unreleased
Shikakui Atama o Maruku Suru: Keisan no Tatsujin		Imagineer	March 30, 2001	Unreleased	Unreleased
Shikakui Atama o Maruku Suru: Kokugo Battle-Hen		Imagineer	September 24, 1999	Unreleased	Unreleased
Shikakui Atama o Maruku Suru: Nanmon no Sho		Imagineer	March 17, 2000	Unreleased	Unreleased
Shikakui Atama o Maruku Suru: Rika Battle-Hen		Imagineer	November 5, 1999	Unreleased	Unreleased
Shikakui Atama o Maruku Suru: Sansū Battle-Hen		Imagineer	March 12, 1999	Unreleased	Unreleased
Shikakui Atama o Maruku Suru: Shakai Battle-Hen		Imagineer	July 16, 1999	Unreleased	Unreleased
Shikakui Atama o Maruku Suru: Zukei no Tatsujin		Imagineer	October 27, 2000	Unreleased	Unreleased
Shikinjō	Shōei System	Toei Animation	July 16, 1991	Unreleased	Unreleased
Shin Keiba Kizoku Pocket Jockey	Graphic Research	King Records	October 16, 1998	Unreleased	Unreleased
Shin Nippon Pro Wrestling: Tōkon Sanjushi		Varie	January 29, 1993	Unreleased	Unreleased
Shin SD Gundam Gaiden: Knight Gundam Monogatari	Tom Create	Bandai	September 9, 1994	Unreleased	Unreleased
The Shinri Game		Visit	June 10, 1994	Unreleased	Unreleased
The Shinri Game 2: Osaka-Hen		Visit	October 14, 1994	Unreleased	Unreleased
Shinseiki GPX Cyber Formula		Varie	February 28, 1992	Unreleased	Unreleased
Shippū! Iron Leaguer	Sun L	Bandai	March 11, 1994	Unreleased	Unreleased
Shisenshō: Match-Mania	Tamtex	Irem	July 13, 1990	Unreleased	Unreleased
Shogi		Pony Canyon	December 19, 1989	Unreleased	Unreleased
Shogi Saikyō		Magical Company	December 23, 1994	Unreleased	Unreleased
Shōnen Ashibe: Yūenchi Panic		Takara	September 27, 1991	Unreleased	Unreleased
Shuyaku Sentai Irem Fighter		Irem	July 30, 1993	Unreleased	Unreleased
Side Pocket	Data East	Data East ^{JP/NA} Nintendo ^{EU}	September 21, 1990	November 1990	September 19, 1991
The Simpsons: Bart & the Beanstalk; Bart no Jack to Mame no Ki ^{JP}	Software Creations	Acclaim ^{NA/EU} Acclaim Japan ^{JP}	September 30, 1994	February 1994	February 1994
The Simpsons: Bart vs. The Juggernauts	Imagineering	Acclaim	Unreleased	September 1992	October 1992
The Simpsons: Itchy & Scratchy in Miniature Golf Madness	Beam Software	Acclaim	Unreleased	November 1994	November 1994
Skate or Die: Bad 'N Rad	Konami	Konami	Unreleased	September 1990	October 31, 1991
Skate or Die: Tour de Thrash	Realtime Associates	EA Sports	Unreleased	June 1991	Unreleased
Slam Dunk: Gakeppuchi no Kesshō League		Bandai	August 11, 1994	Unreleased	Unreleased
Slam Dunk 2: Zenkoku e no Tip Off		Bandai	March 17, 1995	Unreleased	Unreleased
Small Soldiers	Tiertex Design Studios	THQ	Unreleased	November 1998	December 18, 1998
The Smurfs	Bit Managers	Infogrames	Unreleased	October 1998	May 30, 1996
The Smurfs 2: The Smurfs Travel The World	Infogrames	Infogrames	Unreleased	Unreleased	December 19, 1996
The Smurfs 3: The Smurfs' Nightmare	Infogrames	Infogrames	Unreleased	Unreleased	December 18, 1997
Sneaky Snakes	Rare	Tradewest	Unreleased	June 1991	February 1992
Snoopy no Hajimete no Otsukai	Kotobuki Systems	Kemco	December 21, 1996	Unreleased	Unreleased
Snoopy's Magic Show	Kemco	Kemco	April 28, 1990	October 1990	February 27, 1992
Snow Bros. Jr.	Naxat Soft	Naxat Soft ^{JP} Capcom ^{NA/EU}	May 24, 1991	January 1992	July 1992
Soccer Mania; Soccer Boy ^{JP}	Kitty Group	Epic/Sony Records ^{JP} Sony Imagesoft ^{NA}	April 27, 1990	February 1992	Unreleased
Solar Striker	Nintendo R&D1; Minakuchi Engineering	Nintendo	January 26, 1990	February 1990	September 28, 1990
Soldam	Jaleco	Jaleco	August 6, 1993	Unreleased	Unreleased
Solitaire FunPak	Beam Software	Interplay	Unreleased	November 1994	October 1995
Solomon's Club	Graphic Research	Tecmo	April 5, 1991	April 1991	January 30, 1992
Soreyuke!! Kid	Kotobuki Systems	Kemco	July 18, 1997	Unreleased	Unreleased
Space Invaders (1990)	Taito	Taito	March 30, 1990	Unreleased	Unreleased
Space Invaders (1994)	Taito	Nintendo	Unreleased	October 1994	May 23, 1995
Spanky's Quest; Lucky Monkey ^{JP}	Natsume Co., Ltd.	Natsume Co., Ltd.	April 26, 1991	July 1992	April 1992
Speedball 2: Brutal Deluxe	Spidersoft	Mindscape	Unreleased	October 1992	November 1992
Speedy Gonzales; Soreyuke! Speedy Gonzales ^{JP}	Citizen Software	Sunsoft	April 29, 1994	July 1993	January 27, 1994
Spider-Man 3: Invasion of the Spider-Slayers	Bits Studios	LJN	Unreleased	July 1993	July 1993
Spider-Man and the X-Men in Arcade's Revenge	Unexpected Development	LJN	Unreleased	December 1993	December 1993
Spirō	Bit Managers	Infogrames	Unreleased	Unreleased	May 1996
Splitz; Splitz: Nigaoe 15 Game ^{JP}	Enigma Variations	Imagineer	June 25, 1993	Unreleased	March 1993
Sports Illustrated for Kids: The Ultimate Triple Dare!	Halestorm	Malibu Games	Unreleased	April 1994	Unreleased
Sports Illustrated: Championship Football & Baseball	Halestorm	Malibu Games	Unreleased	October 1993	Unreleased
Sports Illustrated: Golf Classic; Golf Classic^{EU}	Unexpected Development	Malibu Games	Unreleased	October 1994	October 1994
Spot: The Cool Adventure; McDonaldland ^{EU} Spot: Cool Adventure ^{JP}	Visual Concepts	Ocean ^{EU} Virgin Interactive Entertainment ^{NA/JP}	February 11, 1994	January 1993	November 1992
Spot: The Video Game; Spot ^{JP}	Software Creations	Virgin Interactive Entertainment ^{NA} Bullet-Proof Software ^{JP} Hi Tech Expressions ^{EU}	October 16, 1992	September 1991	November 1992
Spud's Adventure; Totsugeki! Valetions ^{JP}	Atlus	Atlus	January 25, 1991	June 1991	Unreleased
Spy vs. Spy: Operation Boobytrap; Trappers Tengoku: Spy vs. Spy ^{JP}	Kemco	Kemco	May 2, 1992	September 1992	March 1997
Square Deal: The Game of Two Dimensional Poker; Cadillac II ^{JP}	Hect	Hect ^{JP} DTMC ^{NA}	November 30, 1990	April 1992	Unreleased
Star Sweep	Fupac	Axela	December 19, 1997	Unreleased	Unreleased
Star Trek Generations: Beyond the Nexus	Imagineering	Absolute Entertainment ^{NA} GameTek ^{EU}	Unreleased	November 1994	November 1994
Star Trek: 25th Anniversary	Visual Concepts	Ultra Games ^{NA} Palcom Software ^{EU}	Unreleased	February 1992	October 1992
Star Trek: The Next Generation	Imagineering	Absolute Entertainment ^{NA} GameTek ^{EU}	Unreleased	June 1993	November 1993
Star Wars	NMS Software	Capcom ^{NA} Ubisoft ^{EU}	Unreleased	November 1992	June 17, 1993
Star Wars: The Empire Strikes Back	NMS Software	Ubisoft ^{EU} Capcom ^{NA}	Unreleased	January 1993	April 1993
Stargate	Probe Entertainment Limited	Acclaim	Unreleased	December 1994	April 27, 1995
StarHawk	NMS Software	Accolade	Unreleased	Unreleased	June 1993
Stop That Roach! Hoi Hoi: Game Boy Ban ^{JP}	Koei	Koei	February 18, 1994	June 1994	Unreleased
Street Fighter II	Sun L	Capcom ^{JP} Nintendo ^{NA/EU}	August 11, 1995	September 1995	November 23, 1995
Street Racer	Vivid Image	Ubisoft	September 27, 1996	December 1996	February 27, 1997
Sumo Fighter; Sumo Fighter: Tōkaidō Basho ^{JP}	KID	I'Max ^{JP} DTMC ^{NA}	April 26, 1991	March 1993	Unreleased
Sunsoft Grand Prix; F1 Boy ^{JP}	Lenar	ASK Kodansha ^{JP} Sunsoft ^{EU}	September 28, 1990	Unreleased	1992
Super B-Daman: Fighting Phoenix	Amble	Hudson Soft	July 11, 1997	Unreleased	Unreleased
Super Battletank: War in the Gulf	Panoramic Software; Eastridge Technology	Absolute Entertainment ^{NA} GameTek ^{EU}	Unreleased	April 1994	May 1996
Super Bikkuriman: Densetsu no Sekiban	Tom Create	Yutaka	December 11, 1992	Unreleased	Unreleased
Super Black Bass; Super Black Bass Pocket ^{JP}	Starfish	Starfish ^{JP} Hot B ^{NA}	December 28, 1996	November 1998	Unreleased
Super Black Bass Pocket 2	Starfish	Starfish	June 20, 1997	Unreleased	Unreleased
Super Breakout	Morning Star Multimedia	Majesco	Unreleased	December 1998	Unreleased
Super Chase H.Q.	ITL	Taito	Unreleased	January 1994	September 1994
Super Chinese Fighter GB	Culture Brain	Culture Brain	December 28, 1996	Unreleased	Unreleased
Super Chinese Land 1-2-3 Dash	Culture Brain	Culture Brain	September 13, 1996	Unreleased	Unreleased
Super Chinese Land 3	Culture Brain	Culture Brain	January 13, 1995	Unreleased	Unreleased
Super Hunchback	Ocean	Ocean ^{NA/EU} Imagineer ^{JP}	June 26, 1992	April 1992	October 1992
Super James Pond	Millennium Interactive	Ocean	Unreleased	Unreleased	September 1993
Super Kick Off; Pro Soccer ^{JP}	Enigma Variations	Imagineer	March 27, 1992	Unreleased	July 30, 1992
Super Mario Land	Nintendo R&D1	Nintendo	April 21, 1989	August 1989	September 28, 1990
Super Mario Land 2: 6 Golden Coins	Nintendo R&D1	Nintendo	October 21, 1992	November 1992	January 28, 1993
Super Momotaro Dentetsu	Hudson Soft	Hudson Soft	March 8, 1991	Unreleased	Unreleased
Super Momotaro Dentetsu II	Make Software	Hudson Soft	February 18, 1994	Unreleased	Unreleased
Super Off Road	NMS Software	Tradewest	Unreleased	November 1992	November 1992
Super Pachinko Taisen	Kan's	Banpresto	June 30, 1995	Unreleased	Unreleased
Super R.C. Pro-Am	Rare	Nintendo	Unreleased	October 1991	April 23, 1992
Super Robot Taisen	Winkysoft	Banpresto	April 20, 1991	Unreleased	Unreleased
Super Scrabble	Imagineering	Milton Bradley Company	Unreleased	March 1991	Unreleased
Super Star Wars: Return of the Jedi	Realtime Associates	Black Pearl Software	Unreleased	November 1995	1995
Super Street Basketball	C-Lab	VAP	March 19, 1992	Unreleased	Unreleased
Super Street Basketball 2	Arcadia	VAP	September 16, 1994	Unreleased	Unreleased
Superman	Titus Software	Titus Software	Unreleased	December 1997	January 29, 1998
Swamp Thing	Equilibrium	THQ	Unreleased	October 1992	October 1992
The Sword of Hope	Kemco	Seika Corporation	December 28, 1989	June 1991	March 25, 1993
The Sword of Hope II	Kemco	Kemco	September 4, 1992	September 1996	Unreleased
T2: The Arcade Game	Beam Software	LJN ^{NA/EU} Acclaim Japan ^{JP}	February 25, 1994	November 1992	December 1992
Taikyoku Renju		Towa Chiki	February 23, 1990	Unreleased	Unreleased
Tail 'Gator; Shippo de Bun ^{JP}	Natsume Co., Ltd.	Natsume Co., Ltd. ^{NA/EU} VAP	January 24, 1992	June 1991	November 1992
Taiyō no Tenshi Marlow: O Hanabatake wa Dai-Panic	Technōs Japan	Technōs Japan	May 27, 1994	Unreleased	Unreleased
Taiyō no Yūsha Fighbird GB	Japan System House	Irem	December 20, 1991	Unreleased	Unreleased
TaleSpin	Dual	Capcom ^{NA} Bandai ^{EU}	Unreleased	December 1992	September 23, 1993
Tamagotchi; Game de Hakken!! Tamagotchi ^{JP}	Tom Create	Bandai	June 27, 1997	October 1997	December 18, 1997
Tarzan: Lord of the Jungle	Eurocom	GameTek	Unreleased	October 1994	May 30, 1996
Tasmania Story; Tasmania Monogatari ^{JP}	Pony Canyon	Pony Canyon ^{JP} FCI ^{NA}	July 27, 1990	April 1991	Unreleased
Taz-Mania; Looney Tunes 2: Tazmanian Devil in Island Chase ^{EU}	David A. Palmer Productions	Sunsoft	Unreleased	September 1994	November 1994
Taz-Mania 2 Taz-Mania ^{EU}	Beam Software	THQ	Unreleased	January 1997	February 27, 1997
Tecmo Bowl; Tecmo Bowl GB ^{JP}	Sculptured Software	Tecmo	September 27, 1991	September 1991	Unreleased
Teenage Mutant Ninja Turtles II: Back from the Sewers; Teenage Mutant Ninja Turtles 2 ^{JP} Teenage Mutant Hero Turtles II: Back From the Sewers ^{EU}	Konami	Konami	November 15, 1991	December 1991	May 21, 1992
Teenage Mutant Ninja Turtles III: Radical Rescue; Teenage Mutant Ninja Turtles 3: Turtles Kiki Ippatsu ^{JP} Teenage Mutant Hero Turtles III: Radical Rescue ^{EU}	Konami	Konami	November 26, 1993	November 1993	November 27, 1993
Teenage Mutant Ninja Turtles: Fall of the Foot Clan; Teenage Mutant Ninja Turtles ^{JP} Teenage Mutant Hero Turtles: Fall of the Foot Clan ^{EU}	Konami	Konami ^{JP/EU} Ultra Games ^{NA}	August 3, 1990	August 1990	July 18, 1991
Tekichū Rush		Japan Clary Business	July 30, 1993	Unreleased	Unreleased
Tekkyu Fight! The Great Battle Gaiden	Sun L	Banpresto	July 30, 1993	Unreleased	Unreleased
Tenchi o Kurau	Sun L	Capcom	April 22, 1994	Unreleased	Unreleased
Tenjin Kaisen 2: Yomihon Yumegoyomi	KAZe	Meldac	March 13, 1992	Unreleased	Unreleased
Tennis	Nintendo R&D1; Intelligent Systems	Nintendo	May 29, 1989	August 1989	September 28, 1990
Terminator 2: Judgement Day	Bits Studios	LJN	Unreleased	January 1992	July 30, 1992
Tesserae	Eurocom	GameTek	Unreleased	August 1993	April 1996
Tetris	Nintendo R&D1	Nintendo	June 14, 1989	August 1989	September 28, 1990
Tetris 2	Nintendo R&D1; TOSE	Nintendo	June 14, 1994	December 1993	October 27, 1994
Tetris Attack; Yoshi no Panepon ^{JP}	Intelligent Systems	Nintendo	October 26, 1996	August 1996	November 28, 1996
Tetris Blast; Super Bombliss ^{JP}	Bullet-Proof Software; TOSE	Bullet-Proof Software ^{JP} Nintendo ^{NA/EU}	March 17, 1995	January 1996	March 28, 1996
Tetris Plus	Natsume Co., Ltd.	Jaleco ^{JP} Nintendo ^{NA/EU}	December 27, 1996	August 1997	November 28, 1996
Thunderbirds	KID	B-AI	February 12, 1993	Unreleased	Unreleased
Tintin in Tibet	Bit Managers	Infogrames	Unreleased	Unreleased	April 1996
Tintin: Prisoners of the Sun	Bit Managers	Infogrames	Unreleased	Unreleased	March 1997
Tiny Toon Adventures 2: Montana's Movie Madness; Tiny Toon Adventures 2: Buster Bunny no Kattobi Daibōken ^{JP}	Konami	Konami	December 22, 1993	November 1993	February 24, 1994
Tiny Toon Adventures: Babs' Big Break; Tiny Toon Adventures ^{JP}	Konami	Konami	February 1, 1992	February 1992	September 17, 1992
Tiny Toon Adventures: Wacky Sports; Tiny Toon Adventures 3: Doki Doki Sports Festival ^{JP}	Konami	Konami	November 25, 1994	December 1994	December 1994
Tip Off; GB Basketball ^{JP}	Enigma Variations	Imagineer	March 19, 1993	Unreleased	1993
Titus the Fox	Aqua Pacific	Titus Software	Unreleased	June 1993	June 1993
Tokio Senki: Eiyū Retsuden		Human Entertainment	January 10, 1992	Unreleased	Unreleased
Tokoro's Mahjong Jr.		Vic Tokai	December 22, 1994	Unreleased	Unreleased
Tokyo Disneyland: Fantasy Tour	TOSE	Tomy	July 24, 1998	Unreleased	Unreleased
Tokyo Disneyland: Mickey no Cinderella Shiro Mystery Tour	Graphic Research	Tomy	December 22, 1995	Unreleased	Unreleased
Tom & Jerry	Beam Software	Hi Tech Expressions ^{NA/EU} Altron ^{JP}	December 18, 1992	October 1992	March 25, 1993
Tom and Jerry: Frantic Antics; Tom & Jerry 2: The Movie ^{EU} Tom and Jerry Part 2 ^{JP}	Beam Software	Hi Tech Expressions ^{NA/EU} Altron ^{JP}	January 14, 1994	October 1993	March 31, 1994
Top Gun: Guts and Glory	Distinctive Software	Konami	Unreleased	January 1993	January 1993
Top Rank Tennis; Top Ranking Tennis ^{EU}	Pax Softnica	Nintendo	Unreleased	May 1993	July 28, 1994
Torpedo Range	SETA Corporation	SETA Corporation	April 27, 1991	November 1996	Unreleased
Total Carnage	Midway Games	Malibu Games	Unreleased	February 1994	February 1994
Tottemo! Lucky Man: Lucky Cookie Minna Daisuki!!	Bandai	Bandai	September 22, 1994	Unreleased	Unreleased
The Tower of Druaga	TOSE	Angel	December 31, 1990	Unreleased	Unreleased
Toxic Crusaders	Realtime Associates	Bandai	Unreleased	September 1992	Unreleased
Toy Story	Tiertex Design Studios	Black Pearl Software	Unreleased	May 1996	June 27, 1996
Track & Field; Konamic Sports in Barcelona ^{JP}	Konami	Konami	July 17, 1992	September 1992	March 25, 1993
Track Meet; Track Meet: Mezase! Barcelona ^{JP} Litti's Summer Sports ^{DE}	Interplay	Interplay ^{NA/EU} Hiro ^{JP}	February 14, 1992	1991	November 26, 1992
Trax; Totsugeki! Ponkotsu Tank ^{JP}	HAL Laboratory	HAL Laboratory ^{JP} Electro Brain ^{NA/EU}	January 8, 1991	September 1991	March 1992
Trip World	Sunsoft	Sunsoft	November 27, 1992	Unreleased	1993
True Lies	Beam Software	LJN	Unreleased	February 1995	June 29, 1995
Trump Boy		Pack-In-Video	March 29, 1990	Unreleased	Unreleased
Trump Boy II		Pack-In-Video	November 9, 1990	Unreleased	Unreleased
Trump Collection GB		Bottom Up	November 28, 1997	Unreleased	Unreleased
Tsume Go Series 1: Fujisawa Hideyuki Meiyo Kisei		Magical Company	October 19, 1994	Unreleased	Unreleased
Tsume Shogi Hyakuban Shōbu	C-Lab	Imagineer	April 8, 1994	Unreleased	Unreleased
Tsume Shogi Mondai Teikyō: Shogi Sekai	Use Corporation	I'Max	April 15, 1994	Unreleased	Unreleased
Tsume Shogi: Kanki Godan		Magical Company	October 19, 1994	Unreleased	Unreleased
Tsuri Sensei	Ocarina System	J-Wing	September 11, 1998	Unreleased	Unreleased
Tumblepop	Data East	Data East	November 20, 1992	March 1993	Unreleased
Turn and Burn: The F-14 Dogfight Simulator; Phantom Air Mission ^{EU}	Imagineering	Absolute Entertainment ^{NA} Activision^{EU}	Unreleased	May 1992	November 1992
Turok: Battle of the Bionosaurs; Turok ^{JP}	Bit Managers	Acclaim ^{NA/EU} Starfish ^{JP}	August 7, 1998	December 1997	December 1997
Turrican	The Code Monkeys	Accolade	Unreleased	November 1991	April 1992
TV Champion	Tom Create	Yutaka	October 28, 1994	Unreleased	Unreleased
Twin	Athena	Athena	January 31, 1992	Unreleased	Unreleased
Uchū no Kishi Tekkaman Blade	Sun L	Yutaka	December 18, 1992	Unreleased	Unreleased
Uchū Senkan Yamato		Bec	July 17, 1992	Unreleased	Unreleased
Ultima: Runes of Virtue; Ultima ^{JP}	Origin Systems	Pony Canyon ^{JP} FCI ^{NA}	December 14, 1991	July 1992	Unreleased
Ultima: Runes of Virtue II; Ultima 2 ^{JP}	Origin Systems	Pony Canyon ^{JP} FCI ^{NA}	November 19, 1993	March 1994	Unreleased
Ultra Golf; Konamic Golf ^{JP} Konami Golf ^{EU}	Konami	Konami ^{JP/EU} Ultra Games ^{NA}	November 1, 1991	March 1992	April 1994
Ultraman		Bec	December 29, 1991	Unreleased	Unreleased
Ultraman Ball		Bec	December 22, 1994	Unreleased	Unreleased
Ultraman Chō Tōshi Gekiden		Angel	August 26, 1994	Unreleased	Unreleased
Ultraman Club: Teki Kaijū o Hakken Seyo!	TOSE	Bandai	May 26, 1990	Unreleased	Unreleased
Umi no Nushi Tsuri 2	TOSE	Pack-In-Video	July 10, 1998	Unreleased	Unreleased
Undercover Cops Gaiden: Hakaishin Garumaa		Irem	December 10, 1993	Unreleased	Unreleased
Universal Soldier	The Code Monkeys	Accolade	Unreleased	December 1992	September 29, 1994
Uno 2: Small World	Jupiter Corporation	Tomy	March 3, 1995	Unreleased	Unreleased
Uno: Small World		Tomy	November 26, 1993	Unreleased	Unreleased
Urban Strike	Borta	Black Pearl Software	Unreleased	November 1996	November 1996
Urusei Yatsura: Miss Tomobiki o Sagase!	KID	Yanoman	July 3, 1992	Unreleased	Unreleased
V-Rally: Championship Edition	Velez & Dubail	Ocean	Unreleased	Unreleased	June 1998
Vattle Giuce		IGS	July 12, 1991	Unreleased	Unreleased
Vegas Stakes	HAL Laboratory	Nintendo	Unreleased	December 1995	December 1995
Versus Hero: Kakutō-Ō e no Michi		Banpresto	August 7, 1992	Unreleased	Unreleased
Volley Fire		Toei Animation	June 29, 1990	Unreleased	Unreleased
Wario Blast: Featuring Bomberman! Bomberman GB ^{JP}	A.I	Hudson Soft ^{JP} Nintendo ^{NA/EU}	August 10, 1994	November 1994	June 29, 1995
Wario Land II	Nintendo R&D1	Nintendo	Cancelled	March 1998	March 26, 1998
Wario Land: Super Mario Land 3	Nintendo R&D1	Nintendo	January 21, 1994	February 1994	May 13, 1994
Waterworld	PAM Development	Ocean	Unreleased	Cancelled	November 1995
Wave Race	Pax Softnica; Nintendo EAD	Nintendo	Unreleased	July 1992	June 24, 1997
Wayne's World	Radical Entertainment	THQ	Unreleased	November 1993	Unreleased
WCW World Championship Wrestling: The Main Event; WCW Wrestling: The Main Event ^{EU}	Beam Software	FCI	Unreleased	February 1994	February 1994
Wedding Peach: Jamapii Panic	Atelier Double	KSS	December 8, 1995	Unreleased	Unreleased
Welcome Nakayoshi Park	Tom Create	Bandai	March 3, 1994	Unreleased	Unreleased
Wheel of Fortune; Glücksrad ^{DE}	Data Design Interactive	GameTek	Unreleased	September 1990	December 1992
Who Framed Roger Rabbit	Capcom	Capcom	Unreleased	November 1991	February 25, 1993
WildSnake; Super Snakey ^{JP}	Bullet-Proof Software	Spectrum HoloByte ^{NA} Yojigen ^{JP}	December 20, 1994	September 1994	Unreleased
Winner's Horse	NCS	NCS	September 20, 1991	Unreleased	Unreleased
Winter Olympic Games: Lillehammer '94; Winter Gold ^{EU}	Unexpected Development	U.S. Gold	Unreleased	January 1994	November 1994
Wizardry Gaiden 1: Suffering of the Queen	Sir-Tech	ASCII Corporation	October 1, 1991	Unreleased	Unreleased
Wizardry Gaiden 2: Curse of the Ancient Emperor	Sir-Tech	ASCII Corporation	December 26, 1992	Unreleased	Unreleased
Wizardry Gaiden 3: Scripture of the Dark	Sir-Tech	ASCII Corporation	September 25, 1993	Unreleased	Unreleased
Wizards & Warriors X: The Fortress of Fear	Rare	Acclaim	Unreleased	January 1990	November 1990
WordZap	Realtime Associates	Jaleco	Unreleased	September 1992	Unreleased
Wordtris	Realtime Associates	Spectrum HoloByte	Unreleased	November 1992	Unreleased
World Beach Volley: 1992 GB Cup; World Beach Volley: 1991 GB Cup ^{JP}	Graphic Research	IGS ^{JP} Taito ^{EU}	December 13, 1991	Cancelled	October 1992
World Bowling	Athena	Athena ^{JP} Romstar ^{NA}	January 13, 1990	April 1990	Unreleased
World Circuit Series; F-1 Spirit ^{JP} The Spirit of F-1 ^{EU}	Konami	Konami ^{JP/EU} Ultra Games ^{NA}	February 28, 1991	March 1992	July 1992
World Cup 98	Tiertex Design Studios	THQ	Unreleased	June 1998	June 1998
World Cup USA '94	Tiertex Design Studios	Sunsoft ^{JP} U.S. Gold ^{EU}	July 29, 1994	Cancelled	July 1994
World Heroes 2 Jet; Nettō World Heroes 2 Jet ^{JP}	Takara	Takara	February 24, 1995	August 1995	August 1995
World Ice Hockey		Athena	April 12, 1991	Unreleased	Unreleased
Worms	Team17	Ocean	Unreleased	Unreleased	December 18, 1997
WWF King of the Ring	Eastridge Technology	LJN ^{NA/EU} Acclaim Japan ^{JP}	March 25, 1994	September 1993	November 1993
WWF Raw	Realtime Associates	LJN	Unreleased	September 1994	December 1994
WWF Superstars	Rare	LJN ^{NA/EU} Hot B ^{JP}	February 14, 1992	April 1991	August 1991
WWF Superstars 2	Sculptured Software	LJN ^{NA/EU} Acclaim Japan ^{JP}	May 21, 1993	August 1992	October 1992
WWF War Zone	Probe Entertainment Limited	Acclaim	Unreleased	June 1998	July 1998
X	Argonaut Games; Nintendo R&D1	Nintendo	May 29, 1992	Unreleased	Unreleased
Xenon 2 Megablast	Teeny Weeny Games	Mindscape ^{NA/EU} PCM Complete ^{JP}	December 25, 1992	October 1992	1992
Xerd no Densetsu	Graphic Research	Vic Tokai	October 18, 1991	Unreleased	Unreleased
Xerd no Densetsu 2: Xerd!! Gishin no Ryōiki	Graphic Research	Vic Tokai	February 19, 1993	Unreleased	Unreleased
Yakuman	Intelligent Systems	Nintendo	April 21, 1989	Unreleased	Unreleased
Yamakawa Ichimonittō Nihonshi B Yōgo Mondaishū	C-Lab	Imagineer	April 22, 1998	Unreleased	Unreleased
Yamakawa Ichimonittō Sekaishi B Yōgo Mondaishū	C-Lab	Imagineer	March 20, 1998	Unreleased	Unreleased
Yogi Bear's Gold Rush; Yogi Bear in Yogi Bear's Goldrush ^{EU}	Twilight	GameTek ^{NA} Sunsoft ^{EU}	Unreleased	October 1994	November 24, 1994
Yoshi; Mario & Yoshi ^{PAL}	Game Freak	Nintendo	December 14, 1991	July 1992	December 17, 1992
Yoshi's Cookie	TOSE	Nintendo	November 21, 1992	April 1993	April 28, 1993
Yu-Gi-Oh! Duel Monsters	KCE Shinjuku	Konami	December 16, 1998	Unreleased	Unreleased
Yū Yū Hakusho	Tomy	Tomy	July 23, 1993	Unreleased	Unreleased
Yū Yū Hakusho Dai-Ni-Dan: Ankoku Bujutsu Kai Hen		Tomy	December 10, 1993	Unreleased	Unreleased
Yū Yū Hakusho Dai-San-Dan: Makai no Tobira		Tomy	June 3, 1994	Unreleased	Unreleased
Yū Yū Hakusho Dai-Yon-Dan: Makai Tōitsu Hen		Tomy	December 9, 1994	Unreleased	Unreleased
Z-Kai Kyūkyoku no Eigo Kōbun 285	Tomcat System	Imagineer	November 28, 1997	Unreleased	Unreleased
Z-Kai Kyūkyoku no Eijukugo 1017	Tomcat System	Imagineer	October 1, 1997	Unreleased	Unreleased
Z-Kai Kyūkyoku no Eitango 1500	Tomcat System	Imagineer	July 11, 1997	Unreleased	Unreleased
Zen-Nippon Pro Wrestling Jet	Geo Factory	NCS	July 15, 1994	Unreleased	Unreleased
Zen: Intergalactic Ninja	Konami	Konami	Unreleased	1993	July 1995
Zettai Muteki Raijin-Oh		Tomy	December 28, 1991	Unreleased	Unreleased
Zoids Densetsu	Nova Games	Tomy	June 15, 1990	Unreleased	Unreleased
Zool: Ninja of the "Nth" Dimension	Gremlin Graphics	GameTek ^{NA} Gremlin Graphics^{EU}	Unreleased	1993	February 1994
Zoop	Hookstone	Viacom New Media ^{NA/EU} Yanoman ^{JP}	January 31, 1997	November 1995	October 1995

=== Applications ===
Title	Developer(s)	Publisher(s)	Release date		
Title	Developer(s)	Publisher(s)	Japan	North America	Europe
Game Boy Camera	Creatures Inc.; Nintendo; Jupiter Corporation	Nintendo	February 21, 1998	June 1, 1998	June 4, 1998
Gyogun Tanchiki: Pocket Sonar		Bandai	1998	Unreleased	Unreleased
InfoGenius Productivity Pak: Berlitz French Translator	Imagineering	GameTek	Unreleased	September 1991	1991
InfoGenius Productivity Pak: Berlitz Spanish Translator	Imagineering	GameTek	Unreleased	September 1991	1991
InfoGenius Productivity Pak: Frommer's Travel Guide	NovaLogic	GameTek	Unreleased	September 1991	Unreleased
InfoGenius Productivity Pak: Personal Organizer and Phone Book	Imagineering	GameTek	Unreleased	September 1991	1991
InfoGenius Productivity Pak: Spell Checker and Calculator	Imagineering	GameTek	Unreleased	September 1991	Unreleased

=== Bundle compilations ===
Title	Developer(s)	Publisher(s)	Release date		
Title	Developer(s)	Publisher(s)	Japan	North America	Europe
Bomberman Collection	A.I	Hudson Soft	July 21, 1996	Unreleased	Unreleased
Bugs Bunny Collection	Kotobuki Systems	Kemco	December 19, 1997	Unreleased	Unreleased
Genjin Collection	A.I	Hudson Soft	November 22, 1996	Unreleased	Unreleased
Mortal Kombat & Mortal Kombat II; Mortal Kombat I & II ^{EU}	Probe Entertainment Limited	Acclaim ^{NA/EU} Starfish ^{JP}	September 10, 1998	November 1997	November 1997
Pachiokun Game Gallery		Coconuts Japan	November 29, 1996	Unreleased	Unreleased
Pinball Deluxe	Spidersoft	GameTek	Unreleased	Unreleased	1995
Race Days	Gremlin Graphics	GameTek	Unreleased	November 1994	1994
Sports Collection	TOSE	Tonkin House	September 27, 1996	Unreleased	Unreleased
Taito Variety Pack		Taito	February 28, 1997	Unreleased	Unreleased

=== Unlicensed games ===
==== Before the discontinuation of the Game Boy ====
Title	Developer(s)	Publisher(s)	Release date	Region
2nd Space	Sachen	Sachen	1993	Asia
A-Force: Armour Force	Commin	Commin	1993	Asia
Ant Soldiers	Sachen	Sachen	1993	Asia
Arctic Zone	Commin	Commin	1993	Asia
Black Forest Tale	Sachen	Sachen	1993	Asia
Bomb Disposer	Sachen	Sachen	1993	Asia
Captain Knick-Knack	Sachen	Sachen	1999	Asia
Crazy Burger	Sachen	Sachen	1991	Asia
Dan Laser	Sachen	Sachen	1990	Asia
Deep: Final Mission	Commin	Commin	1990	Asia
Duck Adventures	Commin	Commin	1993	Asia
Exodus: Journey to the Promised Land	Color Dreams	Wisdom Tree	1992	North America
Explosive Brick	Sachen	Sachen	1994	Asia
Hong Kong Mahjung	Commin	Commin	1993	Asia
Japan's Mahjong	Commin	Commin	1993	Asia
Joshua & the Battle of Jericho	Wisdom Tree	Wisdom Tree	1992	North America
King James Bible	Wisdom Tree	Wisdom Tree	1994	North America
Magic Maze	Commin	Commin	1993	Asia
Magical Tower	Sachen	Sachen	1993	Asia
NIV Bible & the 20 Lost Levels of Joshua	Wisdom Tree	Wisdom Tree	1996	North America
Railway	Sachen	Sachen	1993	Asia
Sky Ace	Sachen	Sachen	1993	Asia
Spiritual Warfare	Wisdom Tree	Wisdom Tree	1992	North America
Store Tris 2	Commin	Commin	1993	Asia
Story of Lasama	Unknown	Gowin	1993	Asia
Street Race	Commin	Commin	1993	Asia
Taiwan Mahjong	Commin	Commin	1993	Asia
Trap & Turn	Commin	Commin	1993	Asia
Vex Block	Commin	Commin	1993	Asia
Worm Visitor	Sachen	Sachen	1993	Asia
Zipball	Sachen	Sachen	1993	Asia
Zoo Block	Sachen	Sachen	1990	Asia

==== After the discontinuation of the Game Boy ====
Title	Developer(s)	Publisher(s)	Release date	Region
2021: Moon Escape	Spacebot Interactive	Incube8games	2024	North America
Batty Zabella	Ice.Cold.Blood	Retro Room	2022	North America
BIG2SMALL	mdsteele	Retro Room	2022	North America, Europe
Deadeus	IZMA	Incube8games	2022	North America
Death Planet	Mackerel Interactive	insideGadgets	2019	North America
Dragonborne	Spacebot Interactive	Spacebot Interactive	2021	North America
Fydo's Magic Tiles	Malamute	Malamute	2024	North America
GB Studio Central Gameboy Pixel Art Jam 2023	GB Studio Central	insideGadgets	2023	North America
Gelatinous: Humanity Lost	Steven Long	Retro Room	2023	North America
Genesis	7FH	Incube8games	2021	North America
Genesis 2	7FH	Incube8games	2024	North America
Gunship	7FH	Incube8games	2022	North America
IndestructoTank!	The Exp	Incube8games	2022	North America
Leo Legend	Greenboy Cartridge Games	Incube8games	2022	North America
The Little Tales Of Alexandria	MrE	insideGadgets	2024	North America
Lunar Journey	Greenboy Cartridge Games	Incube8games	2022	North America
Magic & Legend: Time Knights	Legendary Monkey Magic	Retro Room	2022	North America
Magipanels	Bownly	Incube8games	2022	North America
Melon Journey Pocket	Poppy Works	Limited Run Games	2023	North America
Micro Doctor	Greenboy Cartridge Games	Incube8games	2022	North America
Ninja Twins	Mackerel Interactive	insideGadgets	2023	North America
Patchy Matchy	Malamute	Modretro	2024	North America
Phobos Dere.GB	AppSir Games	Limited Run Games	2023	North America
Quartet	Photon Storm	insideGadgets	2021	North America
Quest Arrest	Ice.Cold.Blood	Retro Room	2020	North America
Rod Land	Retro-Bit	Limited Run Games	2024	North America
The Shapeshifter	Greenboy Cartridge Games	Incube8games	2022	North America
The Shapeshifter 2	Greenboy Cartridge Games	Incube8games	2022	North America
Song Of Morus - Gala Of Battle	SunnyChowTheGuy	Retro Room	2023	North America
Submarine 9	Greenboy Cartridge Games	Incube8games	2022	North America
Super Connard	Furrtek Software	Furrtek Software	2013	Europe
Take It Racing 2	Robert Doman	Robert Doman	2023	North America
Tobu Tobu Girl	Tangram Games	First Press Games	2017	North America, Europe, Japan
Tower of Hanoi	Mackerel Interactive	insideGadgets	2019	North America
Traumatarium	Eligos Games	Broke Studio	2022	North America
Traumatarium Penitent	Eligos Games	Modretro	2024	North America
Where Is My Body?	Greenboy Cartridge Games	Incube8games	2022	North America
L'Abbaye des morts	Alekmaul Studio	Broke Studio	2025	Europe
Fortified Zone 2	Jaleco & City Connection	Broke Studio	2025	Europe
Lost Treasure of Lima	drgd retro	Broke Studio	2024	Europe
Inspector Waffles Early Days	Goloso Games	Broke Studio	2024	Europe
SOLASTRA	Vorvy	Broke Studio	2026	Europe
Escape from Blackwood Camp	Rhinochoc	Broke Studio	2026	Europe
Escape 2042	OrionSoft	Broke Studio	2026	Europe
Dangerous Demolition	Dr. Ludos	Broke Studio	2026	Europe
Sushi Gun + Birdie Bartender	MetagameMike	Broke Studio	2026	Europe
Blupi's Adventures	initmaster	Broke Studio	2026	Europe
Dashosaur DX	Sleeping Panda Games	Broke Studio	2026	Europe
Paws & Perils: Out Of This World	Stuart Software	Broke Studio	2026	Europe
Yume Tenshi	GoreFreak	Broke Studio	2026	Europe
Year 2031	Game Brewery	Game Brewery	2025	Europe
Luft Gears	Game Brewery	Game Brewery	2025	Europe
Stains of Decay	Game Brewery	Game Brewery	2026	Europe
A Solution	Per Martinson	DragonBox	2025	Europe
Snow Bros. Nick & Tom	Toaplan	Limited Run Games	2025	North America
Jelly Boy	Probe Software	Limited Run Games	2025	North America
Dragon's Lair	MotiveTime Limited	Incube8games	2025	North America
Flap Happy	Refresh Games	Mega Cat Studios	2024	North America
Kudzu	Pie for Breakfast Studios	Mega Cat Studios, 8-Bit Legit	2024	North America
Retroid	Jonas Fischbach	Mega Cat Studios	2024	North America
Academic Quest	Two-Headed Boy	Two-Headed Boy	2026	North America
Black Tower Enigma	Ogre Pixel	Ogre Pixel	2026	North America
Bun Adventure	Jorunna	Kawa Entertainment	2026	North America
Jett Rider mini H.E.R.O.	JanduSoft	JanduSoft	2026	North America
Squirrel Falls	Rocket Games	Bitmap Soft	2025	Europe
Far After	Brent Lattery (SuitNtie)	Bitmap Soft	2023	Europe
Powerball	Ruben Retro	Bitmap Soft	2024	Europe
Brookwood Pocket Tactics	Werebear Games – Jared Chansen	Bitmap Soft	2024	Europe
Glory Hunters	2think Design Studio – César Arminio	Bitmap Soft	2026	Europe
Yõsei Wars	Felix M A – Nekete	Bitmap Soft	2023	Europe
Ruby & Rusty – Save the Crows	Max Oakland	Bitmap Soft	2022	Europe
Pineapple Kid	MHZ Games	Bitmap Soft	2021	Europe
Tales of Monsterland	Joel Jarman	Bitmap Soft	2021	Europe
Magic Life Counter	Falk Tattoos	Falk Tattoos	2026	North America
Shadow Island	Davey Greenman	Davey Greenman	2026	North America
Triple Threat Terror	Gonçalo Fernandes	Gonçalo Fernandes	2025	North America
Land of the Free	Gonçalo Fernandes	Gonçalo Fernandes	2026	North America
Cel Story	Cel	Phoenix Ware	2024	Europe
COMMODORE 16+4 PACK FOR GAME BOY DMG	László Rajcsányi	insideGadgets	2024	North America

== See also ==
- Lists of video games
- List of cancelled Game Boy games
- List of Game Boy Color games
- List of Game Boy Advance games
- List of multiplayer Game Boy games
- List of Super Game Boy games
- List of Nintendo DS games
- List of Nintendo 3DS games
- List of Virtual Console games for Nintendo 3DS
