= Stop That Roach! =

1994 video game

Stop that Roach!
- North American cover art
- Developer: Koei
- Publisher: Koei
- Platform: Game Boy
- Release: JP: March 4, 1994; NA: July 1994
- Genre: Puzzle
- Mode: Single-player

Stop That Roach! (Note: Japanese: ホイホイ ゲームボーイ版, Hepburn: Hoi Hoi: Game Boy Ban; lit. 'Hoi Hoi: Game Boy Version') is a Game Boy puzzle video game developed and published by Koei.

== Gameplay ==
Trying to prevent two cockroaches from eating one piece of cake.

The video game revolves around an insect exterminator who must kill roaches by any means possible. The Game Boy version allows the player to choose between a male hero (Ken) or a female hero (Lilly).

Similar in style to later tower defense games, the ultimate goal for all 100 levels is to protect confectionaries from the invading cockroaches. Each level is played out in a turn-based strategy manner. Players have four options: they can either attempt to walk into the next square, attempt to scare a cockroach, attempt to kill the cockroach or skip their current turn. Allowing the insects to succeed means that the player loses the round and has the choice of either retrying it or accepting a "game over." The game starts out as relatively simple, until the seventh round, where the complexity of the level design becomes an issue.

== Development and release ==
Stop That Roach! was developed and published by Koei.

It is a new version of a game that was originally released for home computers in Japan. The gameplay was changed from the original which was more of a simulation game into a puzzle video game.

It was released on March 4, 1994 in Japan for the Game Boy. The game was released with branding from Hoi Hoi, a popular brand of cockroach traps in Japan. This cross-promotion was removed for the game's English release.

== Reception ==
Reception

Review score
Publication	Score
Famitsu	5/10, 4/10, 4/10, 4/10

GamePro gave the game a positive review, summarizing it as "a very funny offbeat game." Jonathan Gagnon Game Players gave the game a rating of 56% and criticized the game's poor replay value and sound effects. He considered the game "[not] very good", but unique for its options to skip levels and see the moves needed to win.
