= Skate or Die: Tour de Thrash =

1991 video game

- Developer: Realtime Associates
- Publisher: Electronic Arts
- Series: Skate or Die
- Platform: Game Boy
- Release: NA: June 1991
- Genre: Alternative sports (skateboarding)
- Modes: Single-player, multiplayer

Skate or Die: Tour de Thrash is a 1991 skateboarding video game for the Game Boy that was released only in North America. It was sponsored by Santa Cruz Skateboards.

== Summary ==
There are two gaming modes available: one mode allows players to skate across a half-pipe and perform a series of skateboarding stunts. The second mode challenges players to compete in global skateboarding tournaments, aiming to complete a half-pipe race in under three minutes. Occasionally, rival skaters may obstruct the player's performance. Colliding with concrete walls can result in the player losing time, which is particularly critical given the strict time limit. While performing stunts is crucial in the "Retro Rocket Ramp" mode, racing takes precedence in the "Stale Fish Tour" mode.
