= Pyramids of Ra =

1992 video game

- Developer: Matchbox
- Platform: Game Boy
- Release: July 1992
- Genre: Puzzle
- Mode: Single-player

Pyramids of Ra is a 1992 video game developed by Matchbox for the Game Boy.

== Gameplay ==
Pyramids of Ra is a puzzle video game. The objective of the game is to break all the tiles in a level by bouncing a ball, and returning the ball to its starting tile. The ball can be moved to adjacent tiles horizontally and vertically, but not diagonally. One a tile is broken, it vanishes and players cannot return the ball to it. Some tiles have different properties, requiring two or more bounces to break, moving horizontally or vertically, altering the player's position or changing their movement. The game contains 24,000 levels.

== Development ==
Pyramids of Ra was programmed by Andrew King. It was a departure from publisher Matchbox, whose software titles were most known for their toy car range. The game was showcased by Matchbox as part of the Game Boy line-up at the 1992 Summer Consumer Electronics Show.

== Reception ==
Reception

Review scores
Publication	Score
GamePro	3.75/5
Nintendo Power	2.9/5
VideoGames & Computer Entertainment	8/10

GamePro considered that Pyramids of Ra was on par with other puzzle titles, and its graphics were adequate for the game's simplicity. Video Games & Computer Entertainment felt the game's progressed well from simple to challenging puzzles, and that its problem-solving and action gameplay was balanced well, giving it a 'Honorable Mention' as one of the best strategy titles of the year. Nintendo Power reviewers felt the game was "fun and fast-moving", but that its pyramid theme was spurious and that it was not challenging.
