= Megalit =

1991 video game

- North American box art
- Developer(s): ASCII Corporation
- Publisher(s): WW: Takara; JP: Asmik Ace Entertainment
- Designer(s): Syunsaku Kitamura, Takuya Maekawa
- Platform(s): Game Boy
- Release: JP: August 9, 1991; NA: December 1992; EU: December 1992
- Genre(s): Strategy/Puzzle
- Mode(s): Single-Player

Megalit (メガリット, Megaritto) is a 1991 third party puzzle-solving strategy game developed by ASCII Corporation. It was published for the Nintendo Game Boy by Asmik Ace Entertainment in Japan and Takara in North America and Europe. Megalit was first released in Japan on August 9, 1991. It was not released until December 1992 in North America and Europe.

== Plot ==
A wicked witch wants to rule the world with the power of her magic jewels. She has abducted all the princesses, elves, and faeries who have magic jewels from their castles and has cast a Megalit spell on them. One brave hero comes to the rescue but he also is cast under the wicked witch's spell and is turned into a statue of stone. In order to save the captured princesses and to break his own spell, the brave hero must solve Megalit's puzzle. Restore peace to the Kingdom by helping our hero solve the puzzle.

== Gameplay ==
The object of Megalit is to solve a series of increasingly difficult puzzles through six rounds. Each round is divided into five stages. Controlling the hero who has been turned into a round stone, you must reposition a stacked mound of oblong blocks so that each individual piece can freely touch the ground. The blocks may only fall one level at a time, otherwise they will break upon impact and the player will automatically lose the stage. Megalit features two difficulty settings: Easy and Quest. Quest Mode rearranges the puzzles in a more difficult pattern and adds a time limit in which the player must solve them. The game cartridge utilizes a password feature, allowing the player to return to a previously unlocked round.
