= After Burst =

1990 video game

- Cover art
- Developer(s): Dual
- Publisher(s): NCS
- Composer(s): Atsuhiro Motoyama
- Platform(s): Game Boy
- Release: JP: October 26, 1990
- Genre(s): Action
- Mode(s): Single-player; Multiplayer

After Burst (アフターバースト) is a Japan-exclusive action video game released for the Game Boy in 1990.

== Gameplay ==
The player has to destroy two robots and jump through some platforms before destroying the orb.

Players must control a combat robot with the ultimate goal of destroying the enemy orb. Each level only has one screen to blast hostile robots, solve challenging platforms, and manipulate a series of short puzzles.

There are 30 stages with a boss battle on every tenth stage. A weapon is available; its gunfire can be altered by changing the angle of the gun. The distance of the shot can also be changed by holding down the button for extended periods of time. A two-player duel mode has been added, allowing players to fight either another player or the computer.

This game employs a third-person perspective with a side-view.

== Reception ==
Famitsu	1990	17 Out of 40
Génération 4	Jan, 1991	9 out of 10
Power Play	Feb, 1991	59 out of 100
