= Top Rank Tennis =

1993 video game

- Developer: Pax Softnica
- Publisher: Nintendo
- Platform: Game Boy
- Release: 1993
- Genre: Sports (Tennis)
- Modes: Single-player, multiplayer

Top Rank Tennis, released in some territories as Top Ranking Tennis, is a 1993 sports video game developed by Pax Softnica and published by Nintendo for the Game Boy. Players can play against each other by linking two Game Boys.

== Gameplay ==
Top Rank Tennis has simple yet versatile controls: a single button allows for top spins, slices, and serves, ranging from powerful drives to underhand shots. Players can customize their character's shot power and foot speed, and the game saves this data for ongoing play. Modes include both singles and doubles, with the latter offering either computer-controlled partners or a four-player link-up option—though each participant needs their own cartridge. The presentation adds digitized speech from a gravelly umpire, a techno soundtrack, and a straight-on court view that uses more of the screen. Progression is central: winning against ranked opponents elevates the player's standing, while losing drops the player down the ladder. A colorful cast of opponents are included—like Ace Riley the showman, Bobby Island the reliable bet, and the Quarter Brothers with their weak serves. Post-match statistics reveal aces and serve percentages.

== Development ==
The game was developed by Softnica Co., Ltd. a company founded in 1987.

== Reception ==
Reception

Review scores
Publication	Score
GB Action	90%
Joypad	95%
Nottingham Post	90%
Power Unlimited	70%
Wellingborough and Rushden Herald and Post	3/5

GB Action gave the game a score of 90% praising the gameplay and the graphics as well as the game's difficulty. Power Unlimited gave Top Rank Tennis a score of 70% writing: "It's hardly spectacular, but Top Rank Tennis is a good game nonetheless. The rules are all there and it looks good compared to other Game Boy games. You need a very fast reaction time if you want to win."
