= List of multiplayer Game Boy games =

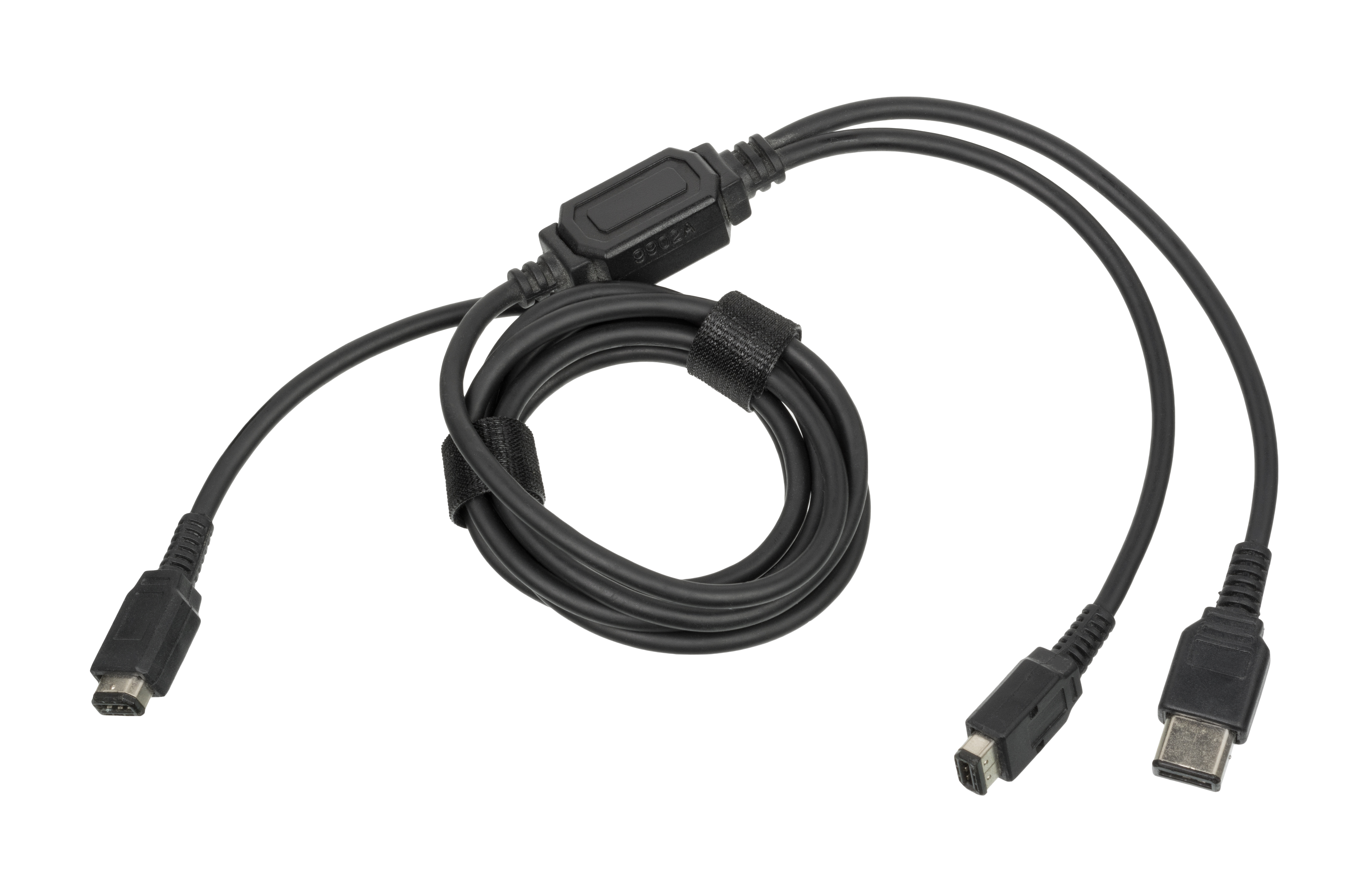
A Game Link Cable with older and newer plugs.

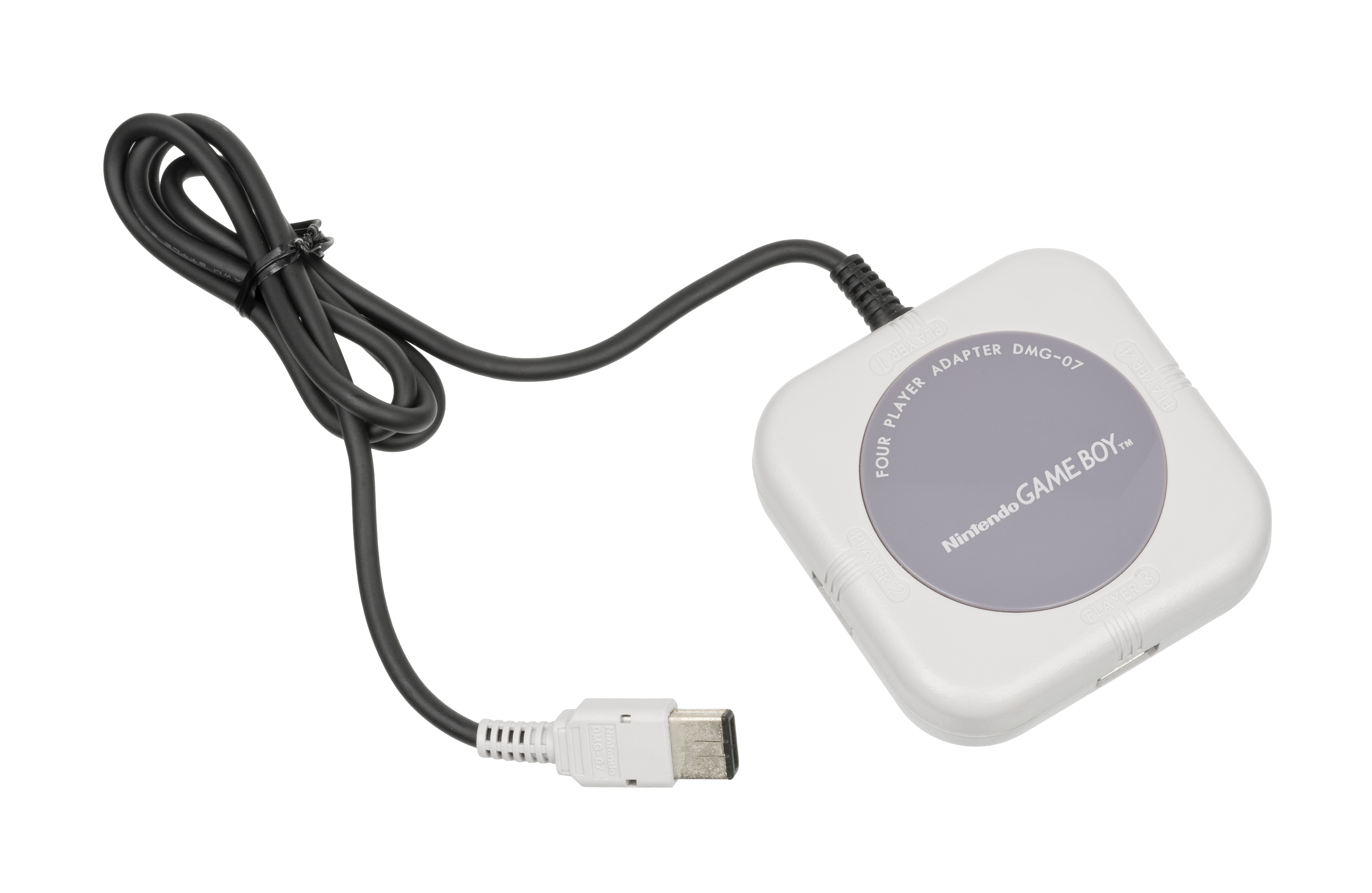
The Four Player Adapter.

This is a list of multiplayer games for the Game Boy handheld game system, organized first by genre and then alphabetically by name. The list omits multiplayer games that use the same system and cartridge for both players. Game Boy Color exclusive titles are not included in this list.

== Two-player games via the Game Link Cable ==
=== Action & Platforming ===
- After Burst
- Asteroids
- Atomic Punk
- Balloon Kid
- Battle Bull
- Bionic Battler
- Boomer's Adventure in Asmik World
- Burai Fighter Deluxe
- BurgerTime Deluxe
- Cosmo Tank
- Cyraid
- Double Dragon
- Double Dragon II
- Double Dragon 3: The Arcade Game
- Dungeon Land (Japan)
- Faceball 2000
- Fist of the north star
- Fortified Zone
- Game & Watch Gallery 3
- Gauntlet II
- Go! Go! Tank
- Heiankyo Alien
- Hyper Lode Runner
- Marble Madness
- Nail 'n' Scale
- Ninja Boy II
- Pac-Man
- Penguin Wars (King of The Zoo)
- Pocket Kyoro Chan (Japan)
- Pop'n TwinBee
- Popeye (Japan)
- Popeye 2
- Revenge of the 'Gator
- Serpent
- Sneaky Snakes
- Space Invaders
- Spy vs Spy
- Titus the Fox: To Marrakech and Back
- Tumble Pop
- Trax
- Volleyfire (Japan)
- Zoids Densetsu (Zoids Legend)

=== Board / Card / Traditional ===
- 4-in-1 Fun Pak
- 4-in-1 Funpak: Volume II
- Chibi Maruko-Chan: Okozukai Daisakusen (Japan)
- High Stakes Gambling
- Ishido: The Way of Stones
- Jantaku Boy Mahjong (Japan)
- Magnetic Soccer
- Monopoly
- Panel Action Bingo
- Pachi-slot Kids 3 (Japan)
- Radar Mission
- Sea Battle
- Side Pocket
- Super Scrabble
- Super Momotaro Dentetsu
- Square Deal: The Game of Two Dimensional Poker
- Uno: Small World (Japan)
- Uno: Small World 2 (Japan)

=== Fighting ===
- Battle Arena Toshinden
- Fighting Simulator: 2 in 1: Flying Warriors
- Fist of the North Star: 10 Big Brawls for the King of the Universe
- Killer Instinct
- Metal Masters
- Mortal Kombat
- Mortal Kombat II
- Raging Fighter
- Ring Rage
- Samurai Shodown
- Street Fighter II
- The King of Fighters '95
- The King of Fighters '96
- World Heroes 2 Jet
- YuYu Hakusho (Japan)

=== Puzzle ===
- Amazing Tater
- Blodia (Japan)
- Boggle
- Boulder Dash EX
- BreakThru!
- Daruman Busters
- Dexterity
- Dr. Mario
- Flipull (Plotting)
- Hatris
- Kirby's Star Stacker
- Kwirk
- Loopz
- Mole Mania
- Palamedes
- Pipe Dream (1990 Bullet Proof Software)
- Puyo Puyo
- Puyo Puyo 2
- Puzznic
- QBillion
- Qix
- Quarth
- Rampart
- Shanghai Pocket
- Snoopy's Magic Show
- Spud's Adventure
- Stargate
- Starsweep
- Tetris
- Tetris 2
- Tetris Attack
- Tetris Blast
- Tetris DX
- Tetris Plus
- WildSnake
- Wordtris
- Yoshi
- Yoshi's Cookie
- Zoop

=== Role-playing ===
- Chou Majin Eiyuuden: Wataru Mazekko Monster 2 (Japan)
- Dragon Warrior Monsters
- Dragon Warrior Monsters 2: Cobi's Journey
- Dragon Warrior Monsters 2: Tara's Adventure
- Keitai Denjū Telefang: Power Version (Japan; unofficial pirate version released in English as Pokémon: Diamond Version)
- Keitai Denjū Telefang: Speed Version (Japan; unofficial pirate version released in English as Pokémon: Jade Version)
- Medarot: Parts Collection (Japan)
- Medarot: Parts Collection 2 (Japan)
- Medarot 2: Parts Collection (Japan)
- Medarot 2: Kabuto Version (Japan)
- Medarot 2: Kuwagata Version (Japan)
- Ō Dorobō Jing: Angel Version (Japan)
- Ō Dorobō Jing: Devil Version (Japan)
- Pocket Monsters: Green Version (Japan)
- Pokémon Gold and Silver
- Pokémon Red and Blue (Pocket Monsters: Green Version in Japan)
- Pokémon Yellow
- Purikura Pocket: Fukanzen Joshikousei Manual (Japan)
- Purikura Pocket 2: Kareshi Kaizou Daisakusen (Japan)
- Rolan's Curse
- Sanrio Time Net: Kako (Japan)
- Sanrio Time Net: Mirai (Japan)
- Ultima: Runes of Virtue
- Ultima: Runes of Virtue II

=== Racing ===
- Bill Elliott's NASCAR Fast Tracks
- Doraemon Kart (Japan)
- F-1 Race
- F1 Pole Position
- Fastest Lap
- Jeep Jamboree: Off Road Adventure
- Micro Machines
- Micro Machines 2: Turbo Tournament
- Motocross Maniacs
- Power Racer
- Race Days
- Super Chase H.Q.
- Super R.C. Pro-Am
- Wave Race
- World Circuit Series (F-1 Spirit)

=== Simulation ===
- Harvest Moon GB
- Harvest Moon GBC
- Harvest Moon GBC 2

=== Sports ===
- Baseball
- Bases Loaded
- Battle Pingpong
- Blades of Steel
- Bo Jackson: Two Games In One
- Double Dribble: 5 on 5
- Extra Bases
- FIFA International Football
- Football International
- Golf
- HAL Wrestling
- Heavyweight Championship Boxing
- Hit the Ice
- Hyperdunk
- In Your Face
- Jimmy Connors Tennis
- Ken Griffey Jr. Presents: Major League Baseball
- Kunio Kun Nekketsu Daiundokai (Japan)
- Malibu Beach Volleyball
- Nintendo World Cup
- NBA All-Star Challenge
- NBA All-Star Challenge 2
- NFL Football
- Play Action Football
- Riddick Bowe Boxing
- Roger Clemens' MVP Baseball
- Soccer Mania
- Sports Collection
- Sports Illustrated: Championship Football & Baseball
- Tecmo Bowl
- Tennis
- Top Rank Tennis
- Track & Field
- Track Meet
- WCW: The Main Event
- World Beach Volley
- WWF Superstars
- WWF Superstars 2
- WWF King of the Ring

=== Strategy ===
- Battleship (called Navy Blue in Japan)
- Kingdom Crusade (The Legend of Prince Valiant)
- Mini 4 Boy (Japan)
- Mini 4 boy 2 - Final Evolution (Japan)
- Navy Blue 90 (Japan)
- Navy Blue 98 (Japan)
- Nobunaga's Ambition
- Power Mission
- Radar Mission
- The Hunt For Red October

=== Strategy / Trading Card ===
- Medarot: Card Robottle Kabuto Version (Japan)
- Medarot: Card Robottle Kuwagata Version (Japan)
- Trade & Battle: Card Hero (Japan)
- Yu-Gi-Oh! Duel Monsters (Japan)

=== Word & Trivia ===
- Jeopardy!
- Jeopardy! Sports Edition
- Word Zap

== Four-player games via the Four Player Adapter ==
- America Oudan Ultra Quiz (Japan)
- Bomberman GB (4 players only with the use of Super Game Boy)
- Chachamaru Panic (Japan)
- Death Track (Prototype)
- Den of Snakes
- Downtown Nekketsu Koushinkyoku: Dokodemo Daiundoukai (Japan)
- F-1 Race
- F1 Pole Position (Nakajima Satoru Kanshuu F-1 Hero GB '92: The Graded Driver in Japan. F1 Challenge in Europe [unreleased].)
- Faceball 2000 (Up to 15 players. There's a hacked version, called Faceball 2000 DX, that goes up to 16 players.)
- Hit the Ice: The Video Hockey League (Prototype version. The released version only has a 2 Player mode.)
- Janshiro (Japan)
- Janshiro II (Japan)
- Jantaku Boy (Japan)
- Jinsei Game Densetsu (Japan)
- Jinsei Game: The Game of Life (Japan) (4 players only with the use of Super Game Boy)
- Micro Machines
- Nakajima Satoru F-1 Hero GB: World Championship '91 (Japan)
- Nekketsu Koukou Dodgeball Bu: Kyouteki! Toukyuu Senshi no Maki (Japan)
- Super Momotarou Dentetsu (Japan)
- Super R.C. Pro-Am
- Top Rank Tennis
- Trax (Totsugeki! Poncotts Tank in Japan)
- Trump Boy II (Japan)
- Uno: Small World (Japan)
- Uno: Small World 2 (Japan) (It's the same game Uno: Small World 1. But it removes the Small mode and with the Super Gameboy's color lecture function.)
- Wario Blast featuring Bomberman (4 players only with the use of Super Game Boy)
- Wave Race
- Wily & Right no RockBoard: That's Paradise (Prototype)
- World Circuit Series (F-1 Spirit in Japan. The Spirit of F-1 in Europe.)
- Yoshi's Cookie

== Games with local multiplayer only (on the same Game Boy) ==
- Chessmaster (turn-based)
- Micro Machines 2: Turbo Tournament (one player turns using the buttons, the other one using the directional pad)
- NFL QuarterBack Club:
- Worms (turn-based, player teams have to be re-created every time the game is turned on, as there is no save)

== See also ==
- Lists of Game Boy games
