= Puss in Boots (disambiguation) =

Puss in Boots is a European fairy tale about an anthropomorphic cat that helps its owner gain riches and fortune.

Puss in Boots or Puss 'n' Boots may also refer to:

== Film and television ==
- Puss in Boots (1922 film), an American animated short by Walt Disney
- Puss in Boots (1934 film), a ComiColor Cartoon by Ub Iwerks
- Puss in Boots, a 1936 animated short by Lotte Reiniger
- Puss in Boots, a 1954 animated short by Lotte Reiniger
- Der gestiefelte Kater, a 1955 German feature film directed by Herbert B. Fredersdorf
- Puss in Boots (1961 film), a Mexican film by Roberto Rodríguez
- Puss in Boots (1969 film), a Japanese animated feature film by Kimio Yabuki
- "Puss in Boots" (Faerie Tale Theatre), a 1985 episode of Faerie Tale Theatre
- Puss in Boots (1988 film), a musical by Eugene Marner starring Christopher Walken
- Adventures of Puss-in-Boots, a 1992 Japanese animated feature film from Enoki Films by Susumu Ishizaki
- Puss in Boots (1993 film), an animated feature film by Richard Slapczynski
- Puss in Boots (1999 film), an American animated feature film by Phil Nibbelink
- The True History of Puss 'N Boots, a 2009 French animated feature film
- Puss in Boots (Shrek), a main character in the Shrek franchise
  - Puss in Boots (2011 film), an American animated film featuring the version from Shrek
  - The Adventures of Puss in Boots, a 2015 Netflix animated television series featuring the version from Shrek
  - Puss in Boots: The Last Wish, a 2022 animated film starring Puss in Boots from the Shrek franchise

== Music ==
- Puss n Boots, an American alternative country group
- Puss in Boots (opera), a 1913 short opera by César Cui
- "Puss 'n' Boots", a 1974 song by New York Dolls from Too Much Too Soon
- "Puss 'n Boots", a 1983 song by Adam Ant, a UK #5 hit single from Strip
- "Puss N' Boots", a 1989 song by Kon Kan
- Puss 'n Boots (The Struggle Continues...), a 1993 album by Professor X the Overseer
- Puss 'n' Boots (album), a 2003 album by Crash Test Dummies

== Literature ==
- Puss in Boots (play), a 1797 play by Ludwig Tieck
- Puss in Boots, an 1842 work by Frances Sargent Osgood
- Puss 'n' Boots (comics), a character pair in the Sparky comic book series
- Puss in Boots, a 1952 picture book illustrated by Marcia Brown
- Puss in Boots, a 1990 picture book illustrated by Fred Marcellino
- Puss in Boots: The Adventures of That Most Enterprising Feline, a 2000 picture book by Philip Pullman and Ian Beck (illustrator)
- Puss in Boots (Pinkney book), a 2012 picture book by Jerry Pinkney

== Video games ==
- Puss 'n Boots: Pero's Great Adventure, a 1990 video game for the Nintendo Entertainment System
- Puss in Boots (video game), a 2011 video game by Blitz Games

== See also ==
- List of Puss in Boots adaptations
- The Tale of Kitty-in-Boots
