= The Legend of Prince Valiant =

- Genre: Action-adventure; Fantasy
- Created by: David J. Corbett
- Based on: Prince Valiant by Hal Foster
- Starring: Robby Benson; Michael Horton; Noelle North; Alan Oppenheimer; Efrem Zimbalist Jr
- Opening theme: "Where the Truth Lies" by Exchange featuring Marc Jordan
- Countries of origin: United States; Germany; France
- Original language: English
- No. of seasons: 2
- No. of episodes: 65

Production
- Running time: 22 minutes
- Production companies: Hearst Entertainment Productions; I.D.D.H.; Polyphon Film-und Fernsehgesellschaft

Original release
- Network: The Family Channel
- Release: September 3, 1991 – June 25, 1993

The Legend of Prince Valiant is an animated television series based on the Prince Valiant comic strip created by Hal Foster. Set in the time of King Arthur, it is a family-oriented adventure show about an exiled prince who goes on a quest to become one of the Knights of the Round Table. He begins his quest after having a dream about Camelot and its idealistic New Order. This television series originally aired on The Family Channel for a total run of 65 episodes.

== Premise ==
Like the original comic strip, the series begins with the fall of Thule, the fictional kingdom to which Prince Valiant is heir. Valiant, his parents, and a group of survivors from the castle are exiled by the ruthless conqueror Cynan to a hostile marsh across the sea. The young prince, deeply saddened by this defeat and vengeful towards Cynan, attempts to make the best of his new life but craves some greater purpose. He finds this purpose when he has a series of dreams about a kingdom called Camelot, King Arthur, Merlin, and the Knights of the Round Table. Valiant becomes enraptured with Camelot's New Order, which is founded on the ideas that might does not make right and that truth, justice, honor and friendship should be the guiding forces in people's dealings with each other. Against the wishes of his father, Valiant leaves the exiles' settlement in search of Camelot so that he may serve King Arthur as a Knight of the Round Table.

During his quest, the prince meets two peasants who fall under the spell of his dream and join him. The first that he meets is Arn, a wandering peasant with great skills as a woodsman but who is ashamed of his class, illiteracy, and clumsiness. The second is Rowanne, the daughter of a blacksmith, who is feisty, unorthodox, and an expert with a bow and arrow. These three quickly become best friends and find Camelot together, but before they can become knights, they must undergo training, face off against various enemies, and do a bit more growing up.

=== Season one (26 episodes) ===
The first few episodes of the series deal with establishing Valiant's backstory and character, uniting him with Arn and Rowanne, and locating Camelot. Two main story arcs guide the rest of the season: 1) Valiant's training and emotional maturity; 2) Cynan's growing threat to Camelot. Through trial and error, Valiant learns the value of humility, patience, responsibility, and controlling his temper. This serves him well as he encounters various emissaries, both good and evil, connected to Cynan that indicate his ambition to invade Camelot. By the end of the season, Valiant has proven himself enough to be allowed to lead an army back to Thule and reclaim his homeland from Cynan's forces. He successfully does so with the help of Arn, Rowanne, Merlin, and his father King Williem. The season ends with Valiant bidding farewell to his parents and childhood home, returning to Camelot, and being knighted by King Arthur. There are also several stand-alone adventures that cause the trio of Valiant, Arn, and Rowanne to grow in fame throughout the kingdom.

Several key storylines begin during the first season that would not be resolved until the following year. The most obvious is Arn and Rowanne's desire to be knighted — their training and coming of age sagas continue throughout the second season. The love triangle amongst the trio (where Arn and Valiant both have feelings for Rowanne and Rowanne cares for both of them equally) is pushed to the background towards the end of the season and will resurface with new complications later on. Recurring villain Duncan Draconarius slowly undergoes a process of redemption that has yet to be completed. Another character, Denys, is briefly introduced yet will come into his own as a recurring character during the second season. Conflicts that are left to percolate until the second year include Camelot's hostilities with the Viking nation, the fallout from the massacre of the Viking peace delegation, the threat posed by a newly exiled Sir Mordred, and the beginnings of popular discontent towards Arthur's New Order. Also unknown are the final fates of the villains Robert (who is never heard from again), Cynan, Dylan, and Lord Maldon.

=== Season two (39 episodes) ===
Three main story arcs guide the overall course of the second season: 1) Valiant settling in as a knight and honing his leadership abilities; 2) Arn and Rowanne coming to terms with their insecurities as they continue to work towards knighthood; 3) the growing threat posed by the various factions of Mordred's New Dawn, a corruption of Arthur's New Order. Mordred and his partner Lord Maldon prey upon the public's prejudice against non-native Camelotians and fear of an imminent Viking invasion. The situation grows steadily worse over the course of the season as Mordred forms alliances with Camelot's enemies (including the Viking nation and the Misty Isles) and a traitor within Camelot takes steps to ensure its downfall. By this time, Arn and Rowanne have both earned their spots at the Round Table, while Valiant has risen in status to become one of the leading knights of Camelot.

Towards the end of the series, King Arthur enacts a drastic plan to foil the New Dawn, a plan that goes awry due to Maldon and causes Arthur to be buried alive. Queen Guinevere then makes the surprise move of proclaiming Prince Valiant to be Arthur's chosen heir and the new King of Camelot. Camelot continues to lose ground against its enemies until a series of surprise events turn the tide of battle: the Vikings acquire information about Mordred that causes them to end their alliance; the general public revolts against the New Dawn's forces; Valiant defeats Mordred in combat and reclaims Excalibur; and Arthur returns alive and well. The series ends with King Arthur back on his throne and saluting the future of Camelot under the New Order as Valiant, Arn, and Rowanne stand by his side.

Other notable storylines develop over the course of the season that influence the main plot arcs. One is the introduction of Princess Aleta and King Hugo of the Misty Isles — these characters add new dimensions to the Valiant-Rowanne-Arn love triangle and the danger posed by Mordred's forces. The Northland storyline also complicates the love and war arcs while providing the catalyst for Arn and Rowanne to finally achieve knighthood. Duncan Draconarious is revisited in a few episodes that place him firmly on the side of Camelot. Several stories focus on Valiant's young squire Denys, including one that finalizes the fate of season one villains Cynan and Dylan. Also, there are the stand-alone adventures that add to Valiant, Arn, and Rowanne's growing legend in Camelot.

Some unresolved and underdeveloped plot threads are worth pointing out at this juncture. One is Valiant and Aleta's marriage, an important part of the comic strip that never transpired onscreen (the two characters end the series betrothed). Another is Rowanne's relationship with King Michael of Northland, which developed rather abruptly and lacked definite closure as the series geared up for its finale. Lady Morgana, introduced in the first season with the potential to become a major antagonist, is forgotten about until the very end of the second season.

== Characters ==
=== Main characters ===
- Prince Valiant (voiced by Robby Benson) — exiled prince of Thule, Valiant is courageous, noble, kind, and headstrong dreamer who is fiercely loyal to and protective of Camelot and his friends. He can be reckless and egotistical on occasion. He wields the Singing Sword, sister blade to Excalibur, and rides a black horse named Caliburn. He is knighted after defeating Cynan and later falls in love with Princess Aleta on first sight. He matures later on and briefly becomes King of Camelot. Valiant is the only character to appear in every episode of the series.
- Arn (voiced by Michael Horton) — insecure but good-hearted wandering woodsman, Arm believes he is unworthy of knighthood due to his illiteracy, social status, and occasional clumsiness. Arn possesses great tracking and survival skills and rides a brown horse named Crux. Orphaned in a Viking raid, he now considers Valiant and Rowanne his family. He harbors an unrequited love for Rowanne. He is later knighted after defeating the treacherous Baron of Lionsgate and his son who were plotting against Camelot.
- Rowanne of Bridgesford (voiced by Noelle North) — strong-willed, spirited peasant who rejects tradition, Rowanne is determined to become the first female Knight of the Round Table; she rides a white horse that is never named. She is temperamental and stubborn, but a romantic at heart, which leads to vicious love triangles and fits of jealousy. She is a highly proficient archer who learned the blacksmithing trade from her father. After stopping numerous plots against Highland and Camelot, Rowanne was knighted at the same time as Arn, choosing Camelot over her courtship with King Michael.
- Merlin (voiced by Alan Oppenheimer) — a mysterious royal advisor, Merlin possesses great wisdom and a knowledge of alchemy and other sciences that laymen mistake as magic. He is an intellectual man who remains in good physical shape despite his age. Merlin traveled the world in his youth, then raised and protected Arthur from infancy. He mentors Arthur and Valiant through direct counsel and cryptic suggestions.
- King Arthur (voiced by Efrem Zimbalist, Jr.) — ruler of Camelot and founder of the New Order, Arthur is a living legend to his people since the day he freed Excalibur from a stone. Stern and fair, he firmly believes in ruling through peace, truth, and honor rather than warfare. He is extremely sensitive to betrayal, especially that of Sir Mordred. Arthur enjoys an affectionate marriage to Guinevere and a lasting friendship with Merlin. He regards Valiant as central to the future of Camelot.
- Sir Gawain (voiced by Tim Curry) — an egotistical veteran Knight of the Round Table and a mighty warrior who is considered the brawn of the Gawain-Bryant duo. Justifiably renowned and respected, Gawain is one of four knights who survived the legendary Combat of the Thirty. He is ladies' man with a short fuse when anyone threatens or insults his king. Gawain trains Valiant, Arn, and Rowanne, forming a particularly close bond with Valiant.
- Queen Guinevere (voiced by Samantha Eggar) — serene and elegant ruler of Camelot, Guinevere is an intelligent and strong woman who is fully capable of taking the lead in a crisis. She is in charge of the kingdom's cultural activities and fully supports the New Order. Deeply in love with her husband Arthur, she serves a calming influence on him. Despite regretting not having children, she sees Valiant and his friends as Camelot's second generation.
- Sir Bryant (voiced by James Avery & Dorian Harewood) — stoic and just veteran Knight of the Round Table, Bryan is a noble, thinking-man's warrior who is considered the brains of the Gawain-Bryant duo. He emigrated from Iberia (where he was a prince) with his wife and son, who were subsequently murdered by highwaymen. He takes his responsibilities as a knight and role model extremely seriously, and trains Valiant, Arn, and Rowanne for knighthood.

=== Recurring characters ===
- King Williem (voiced by Peter Renaday) — Valiant's father and King of Thule.
- Queen Briana (voiced by Marnie Mosiman) — Valiant's mother and Queen of Thule. Her name is given in episode "The Dream Come True".
- Rolf – (voiced by Dan Gilvezan) - Williem's Lord of Arms and early mentor to Valiant, he is killed by a rogue knight.
- King Cynan (voiced by Tony Jay) — a ruthless conqueror of Thule with ambitions to invade Camelot. Father of Dylan and Denys, he is the main antagonist of the first season.
- Cedric (voiced by Brian Cummings) — Rowanne's father and a blacksmith in Bridgesford. He gives Valiant the Singing Sword.
- Elizabeth (voiced by Diane Pershing) — Rowanne's mother.
- Duncan Draconarius (voiced by Neil Ross) — a corrupt baron who governs Bridgesford. He is deposed by Valiant and ventures to Camelot for sanctuary. He opposes the New Order until its ideals cause Arthur to spare his life. Duncan is sent to Kengary to pay for a crime he committed against that kingdom, but later becomes its king. He originally competed with Arthur for Guinevere's hand in marriage.
- Robert Draconarius (voiced by Rob Paulsen) — Duncan's younger brother and the Sheriff of Bridgesford. He Had high hopes of marrying Rowanne, but was deposed when his brother lost power.
- Sir Mordred (voiced by Simon Templeman) — a champion of Camelot and an old friend of Arthur's, Mordred believes that might makes right and peace can only be preserved through warfare. He secretly murdered a Viking peace delegation years earlier. Mordred founded the New Dawn with the hopes of dethroning Arthur and ruling Camelot his way. He is the main antagonist of the second season.
- Lady Morgana (voiced by Patty Duke & Diana Muldaur) — Arthur's older half-sister, Mordred's early lover, an alchemist and a rival of Merlin.
- The Mighty Om (voiced by Clive Revill) — Merlin's former pupil and loyal friend.
- Sir Kay (voiced by Jameson Parker) – a veteran Knight of the Round Table, he is later revealed to be a traitor and murderer of King Hugo. He was killed by a virus that Morgana infected him with.
- Dylan (voiced by Sean Astin & Jordan Jacobson) – Cynan's treacherous eldest son, he was put in a coma by his father's deeds.
- Lord Maldon (voiced by Jeff Bennett) — bitter and vindictive son of one of Arthur's old enemies, Maldon supports the New Dawn for his own purposes. He is a bell-maker who knows the formula for gunpowder (and was severely disfigured in an explosion).
- Denys (voiced by Jack Lynch) — younger son of Cynan, Denys is Valiant's squire and surrogate younger brother. Like the prince, he's drawn to Camelot because of a dream and yearns to become a knight.
- Owen (voiced by Michael York) — a weapons master of Thule, whose family is slaughtered by Cynan. He disavows his allegiance to Williem and joins the New Dawn.
- Aleta (voiced by Paige O'Hara) — impetuous and often prideful Princess (later Queen) of the Misty Isles. She is a competent fighter who steadfastly believes in the ideals of the New Order. Aleta falls in love with Valiant shortly after meeting him.
- King Hugo (voiced by John Rhys-Davies) — Aleta's father and ruler of the Misty Isles, Hugo was exiled forty years ago for attempting to dethrone Arthur. A surly man who is disinclined to let go of old grudges, Hugo is murdered by Sir Kay.
- Prince Michael (voiced by Wil Wheaton) — Prince (later King) of Northland who is committed to the New Order in Season 2. He falls for Rowanne shortly after meeting her and offers to knight her if she stays in Northland as his queen.
- Duke of Lionsgate (voiced by David Warner) — a Duke from Northland, he opposed to peace with Camelot. He attempts to exert control over his nephew Prince (later King) Michael.
- Bosleigh (voiced by Gregg Berger) — the son of the Duke of Lionsgate, he opposed to peace between Northland and Camelot. He is accidentally killed by an arrow fired by the Duke, who was aiming for Arn.
- Selena (voiced by Teri Garr) — sage advisor of Northland who attempts to manipulate Michael to satisfy her own agenda. Merlin had her banished from their homeland which she openly plays against him.
- Allyn (voiced by Stephen Wolfe Smith) — a peasant who is prejudiced against non-native Camelotians. He's enticed by Lord Maldon to join the New Dawn.

== Episodes ==
=== Series overview ===
Season	Episodes	Originally released	
Season	Episodes	First released	Last released
1	26	September 3, 1991	February 24, 1992
2	39	October 2, 1992	June 25, 1993

=== Season 1 (1991–92) ===
"No. in Series" refers to the sequence on the DVD release.

No. overall	No. in series	Title	Written by	Original release date
1	1	"The Dream"	Diane Dixon	September 3, 1991
Prince Valiant's father King Williem loses his throne to Cynan's invading army. The deposed family is sent into exile, and young Prince Valiant has a dream of a city called Camelot and begins his quest to find this realm.
2	2	"The Journey"	Diane Dixon	September 10, 1991
Still on his quest to Camelot, Valiant meets and befriends a wandering peasant named Arn, who joins him in his journey.
3	3	"The Blacksmith's Daughter"	Chris Weber & Karen Willson	September 17, 1991
In a town under the thrall of a corrupt baron Duncan Draconarius (Neil Ross), Valiant and Arn meet Rowanne, the daughter of the local blacksmith, and the unwanted object of desire for the baron's brother Robert (Rob Paulsen), the town's sheriff.
4	4	"The Kidnapping"	David J. Corbett	September 24, 1991
A would-be bounty hunter (Jerry Houser) attempts to capture Rowanne to bring her back to the Baron Draconarius, only for both to be hunted by the baron's bounty hunter Garth.
5	5	"The Trust"	Brooks Wachtel	October 1, 1991
Valiant stumbles into a cave, inhabited by a mad viking with a tragic story and a great mission left unfinished.
6	6	"The Finding of Camelot"	Diane Dixon & David J. Corbett	October 8, 1991
The group finally arrives at Camelot but their news of the viking peace treaty puts them at odds with warmongers hidden in the court.
7	7	"The Gift"	Frank Kerr	October 15, 1991
The trio are now in training to become knights of the Round Table. Rolf, Valiant's former mentor, also arrives to the kingdom carrying a message from Willem. Valiant refuses the letter, bitter for the apparent disregard his father showed when he left for Camelot and wanting nothing to do with him.
8	8	"The Singing Sword"	Frank Kerr	October 22, 1991
Rowanne and Arn return to Bridgeford, following a premonition of great danger. The Baron is determined to extinguish all thoughts of Camelot from his shire, even by executing the knights-in-training. Valiant, the only one left who can save them, receives a great gift from Rowanne's father, a sword like no other.
9	9	"The Trust Betrayed"	Brooks Wachtel	October 29, 1991
Lord Mordred is a knight famed and loved throughout Camelot, but he hides dark secrets. Not only does he side with Lady Morgana, rival advisor to Merlin, but he is guilty of a crime no one but Valiant would dare accuse him of.
10	10	"The Secret of Perilous Garde"	Karen Willson & Chris Weber	November 5, 1991
Sir Gawain is getting married, but while serving as emissaries to the kingdom of Perlious Garde, whose queen is the one Gawain is to wed, the group learns that all might not be as it seems.
11	14	"The Return"	Jack Mendelsohn	November 12, 1991
Baron Duncan Draconarius and his brother seek refuge in Camelot, with Arthur barely containing his resentment for Duncan. Duncan's plot to sabotage Arthur's negotiations with the hot-headed King Ian of Kengerry (Ron Perlman) in the dead of night result in him accidentally killing the foreign king's advisor. Arthur's commitment to the principles of his New Order is put to the test when Duncan is found innocent in the trial that followed.
12	12	"The Visitor"	Frank Kerr	November 19, 1991
A visiting champion, Sir Harold of York, seems everything a knight should be. More than that, he shows Arn that being peasant-born does not make him less than any other knight. This perfect lord however might not be everything that he claims, especially with regards to the Battle of the Thirty as Gawain takes an interest in dueling him.
13	15	"The Awakening"	Brooks Wachtel	November 26, 1991
Valiant, Arn, and Rowanne seek out an old friend of Merlin's for help when Merlin is slipped a poisonous sleeping potion by Lady Morgana (Patty Duke).
14	21	"The Guardian"	David J. Corbett	December 3, 1991
The simpleminded descendant of Romans who used to guard Hadrian's Wall claims there is a danger to Camelot waiting outside the old Roman wall.
15	13	"The Trap"	Diane Dixon	December 10, 1991
Arthur and Guinevere hope to enjoy their wedding anniversary, but kidnappings, poisonings, and attacks by old enemies might spell the end of them.
16	16	"The Turn of the Wheel"	Martin Pasko	December 17, 1991
When an unfamiliar knight named Sir Dylan visits the castle and offers Valiant an opportunity so exciting that he is tempted to neglect his duties, an unfinished chore might put the king's life in peril.
17	17	"The Competitor"	Frank Kerr	December 24, 1991
A rivalry over Rowanne develops between Valiant and a visiting prince, who both also hope to be chosen by King Arthur to carry an important message. The visiting prince's brother Giles looks on as the rivalry gets out of hand.
18	18	"The Road Back"	Brooks Wachtel	December 30, 1991
Valiant escorts Baron Duncan Draconarius to the kingdom of Kengerry to make restitution for the chaos Duncan had caused there previously.
19	19	"The Fist of Iron"	Martin Pasko	January 6, 1992
Giles suspects Sir Gideon, a one-handed knight, of colluding to extort silver from a mining village, but Giles hesitates to accuse the knight, for fear of others attributing it to self-interested motives.
20	20	"The Waif"	Chris Hubbell & Sam Graham	January 13, 1992
After rescuing a boy named Denys from his abusive master, Valiant defends the boy from the master's legal claims, but when Valiant learns Denys's identity, he rethinks his support for the boy.
21	11	"The Dawn of Darkness"	Brooks Wachtel	January 20, 1992
A bitter enemy of Camelot is ready for war, using a weapon of unequaled might. Though such destructive forces are first mistaken as "dragons", their true nature is far more deadly than this world is ready for.
22	22	"The Battle of Greystone"	Chris Hubbell & Sam Graham	January 27, 1992
Cynan's son Dylan has captured Greystone Keep, but an injury prevents Gawain from leading Camelot's forces to regain it.
23	23	"The Reunion"	Frank Kerr	February 3, 1992
Before leaving for Thule, Valiant returns to his parents' home in the swamps with news of his mission. Arn and Rowanne help his home town repel oppressors.
24	24	"The Choice"	Frank Kerr	February 10, 1992
Valiant leads a fleet to Thule to liberate his home, but wrestles with the possibility that this may mean giving up his dream of serving Camelot.
25	25	"The Triumph"	Brooks Wachtel	February 17, 1992
Valiant arrives in Thule and leads the attack on Cynan to regain his father's throne.
26	26	"The Dream Come True"	Diane Dixon	May 10, 1992
With Valiant's father restored to the throne and the people of Thule freed from Cynan's tyranny, Valiant, Arn and Rowanne return to Camelot.

=== Season 2 (1992–93) ===
The sequence on the DVD release is identical to the regular episode order, for season 2.

No.	Title	Written by	Original release date
27	"The Lost"	Brooks Wachtel	October 3, 1992
28	"The Beggar"	Frank Kerr	October 9, 1992
29	"The Black Rose"	Sam Graham, Chris Hubbell	October 16, 1992
30	"The Deception"	Sam Graham, Chris Hubbell	October 23, 1992
31	"The Cursed"	Brooks Wachtel	October 30, 1992
Mordred and Maldon resurface in the village of Serenity, preying on the villagers' prejudice towards Lucitainian refugees that live right across from them.
32	"The Flute"	David J. Corbett, Diane Dixon	November 6, 1992
While working as emissaries in Cathington, Valiant and Denys discover that renowned peacemaker King Donovan (John Rhys-Davies) is abusive towards his son, Henry.
33	"The Color of Honor"	Doug West	November 13, 1992
Newly appointed sheriff Valiant must clear Bryant's name when he is accused of being a spy for Moorish pirates, the captain of whom he has a history with.
34	"The Traitor"	Dorothy Fontana	November 20, 1992
35	"The Tree"	Brooks Wachtel	November 27, 1992
36	"The Crossbow"	Peter Telep	December 4, 1992
37	"The Lesson Twice Learned"	Jeff Sullivan, Bruce Onder	December 11, 1992
A reunion with one of his old mentors, Lorn, leads Valiant to ask him to be appointed King Arthur's new strategist, but a disastrous outing with Gawain shows Valiant that time has not been kind to Lorn's once great strategic mind.
38	"The Princess Aleta"	Frank Kerr	December 18, 1992
39	"The Voyage"	Frank Kerr	December 25, 1992
40	"Mordred's Return"	Frank Kerr	January 1, 1993
41	"The Rescue"	Frank Kerr	January 8, 1993
42	"The Parting"	Frank Kerr	January 15, 1993
43	"Peace on Earth"	Sam Graham, Chris Hubbell	January 22, 1993
44	"Empty Justice"	Jeff Sullivan, Bruce Onder	January 29, 1993
45	"The Rival"	Barbara Slade	February 5, 1993
46	"The Walls of Tyranny"	Douglas Brooks West	February 12, 1993
47	"The Jubilee"	Judith Reeves-Stevens & Garfield Reeves-Stevens	February 19, 1993
48	"The Treaty"	Sam Graham, Chris Hubbell	February 26, 1993
49	"The Blackest Poison"	Jeffrey Sullivan, Bruce Onder	March 5, 1993
50	"The Hero"	Judith Reeves-Stevens & Garfield Reeves-Stevens	March 12, 1993
Denys learns a harsh lesson about idol worship when his hero, Raymond of Long Port (Ron Perlman), joins in on a job, and soon shows he is not the hero Denys thinks he is.
51	"The Vision"	Barbara Slade	March 19, 1993
52	"The Shadows of Destiny"	Brooks Wachtel	March 26, 1993
53	"The Eyes of the Serpent"	Douglas Brooks West	April 2, 1993
54	"The Spirit of Valor"	Douglas Brooks West	April 9, 1993
Arn takes up drinking while he, Valiant, and Rowanne attend the wedding of Arthur and Guinevere's goddaughter to the king of another kingdom. Arn however may have to kick his habit quickly when he over hears an assassination plot against the king, or rather, 'a' king.
55	"The Aurora"	Judith Reeves-Stevens & Garfield Reeves-Stevens	April 16, 1993
56	"The Burning Bridge"	Judith Reeves-Stevens & Garfield Reeves-Stevens	April 23, 1993
57	"The Sage"	Judith Reeves-Stevens & Garfield Reeves-Stevens	April 30, 1993
58	"The Song of Valor"	Judith Reeves-Stevens & Garfield Reeves-Stevens	May 7, 1993
59	"The Ring of Truth"	Judith Reeves-Stevens & Garfield Reeves-Stevens	May 14, 1993
60	"A Light in the Dark"	Brooks Wachtel	May 21, 1993
61	"The Ghost"	Brooks Wachtel	May 28, 1993
62	"A New Dawn"	Chris Hubbell, Sam Graham	June 4, 1993
63	"The Death of Arthur"	Chris Hubbell, Sam Graham	June 11, 1993
64	"The Gathering Storm"	Brooks Wachtel	June 18, 1993
65	"The Hinge of Fate"	Brooks Wachtel	June 25, 1993

== Themes ==
- The New Order
- Dawn/sunlight
- Destiny
- Maturity, coming of age
- Friendship
- Tolerance/prejudice
- Trust/betrayal
- Forgiveness/vengeance
- Knighthood/The Round Table

== Connections to Arthurian lore and the comic strip ==
The characters of King Arthur, Queen Guinevere, Merlin, Sir Gawain, Sir Mordred, Lady Morgana, and Sir Kay are all major characters with origins in Arthurian legend. Also pulled from traditional lore are Camelot, the Knights of the Round Table, and Arthur's sword Excalibur. The general chivalric principles Camelot is famous for have been codified on this series as the New Order. In addition, the second-season episode "The Black Rose" features the characters of King Lot, King Uther, and Queen Igraine in a flashback episode that retells the famous "sword in the stone" legend.

Like the television series, the Prince Valiant comic strip is set in the world of King Arthur and features the above list of major characters amongst its cast. Both the comics and the TV show have the characters of Prince Valiant and Queen Aleta as well as their respective realms — Thule and the Misty Isles — and Valiant's Singing Sword. There are two Arns in the comic book continuity: a young prince who is Valiant's rival for a beautiful maiden, and Valiant and Aleta's firstborn son. The latter character grows up to become a heroic figure equal in importance to his father. In the comics, Valiant's father is named Aguar instead of Williem, while his mother in the comics is unnamed (she is called Briana on the series). In the comics Thule is conquered by a tyrant named Sligon (who has a daughter and no sons) rather than Cynan. There are several situations, adventures, and minor characters from the comics that are retold in the animated series.

Rowanne and Sir Bryant are the two major characters from the television show that do not have counterparts in Arthurian legends or the long running Prince Valiant comic strip.

== Production ==
Hearst Entertainment Distribution President Bill Miller hired David J. Corbett to adapt Prince Valiant which the company controlled through their ownership of King Features Syndicate. The series' pre-production period lasted a year and a half before production formally commenced in July 1990 at a budget of $350,000 per episode. Miller said the series was not a direct adaptation of creator Hal Foster's as they were often too lengthy to lend themselves to adaptation, but did read through the strip's run and cherry picked elements that could be adapted albeit with some alteration. When adapting the strip, it was decided to drop the fantastical elements of the strip that would give writers and the characters overly easy solutions and wanted to avoid falling into typical "kid vid" material. The character of Rowanne was created to play to the female demographic and was designed with modern sensibilities the writers compared to Maid Marian's depiction in Robin Hood: Prince of Thieves with the character and expert marksman with aspirations of becoming a knight. The series was designed in mind with an ongoing narrative and character growth with Corbett comparing the series format to that of L.A. Law where not everything is resolved and wrapped up at the end of the episode and will be addressed in subsequent installments.

== Merchandise ==
=== Soundtrack ===
The Legend of Prince Valiant

Soundtrack album by Exchange
- Released: October 22, 1991
- Genre: Soundtrack
- Label: Rhino Records, Inc

The Legend of Prince Valiant Soundtrack consists of eighteen tracks of background themes produced, composed and performed by the instrumental duo Exchange (Gerald O'Brien and Steve Sexton). The soundtrack is noteworthy for including the full version of the show's opening theme (Where the Truth Lies) as well as a pop song using the show's love music (Love Called Out My Name).

Track listing

1. "Where the Truth Lies" (performed by Exchange featuring Marc Jordan)
2. "Celebration Dance"
3. "Sir Bryant"
4. "Love Called Out My Name" (performed by Exchange featuring Amy Sky and Marc Jordan)
5. "Guinevere"
6. "Search and Journey"
7. "In the Shadows"
8. "Valiant's Theme"
9. "A Monks Evil Drone"
10. "Ending Title Theme"
11. "The Majesty's Feast"
12. "The Serenade"
13. "Valiant & Rolf"
14. "Victory March"
15. "All Alone"
16. "Danger is Near"
17. "Valiant Leaves Home"
18. "Where the Truth Lies (reprise)"

=== Video games ===
In 1991 and 1992, King Features Syndicate licensed the rights to Ocean Software to make video game versions of The Legend of Prince Valiant television series for Nintendo Entertainment System (developed by Special FX Software and published only in Europe) and Game Boy (developed by Sculptured Software and got published by Electro Brain outside of Europe as Kingdom Crusade). The NES version is a fighter/action game and tells the story of Valiant's search for Camelot at the beginning of season one. The player controls Valiant, enabling him to walk, jump, and throw things at opponents. Typical obstacles are pit traps, water hazards and Archers embedded in the background who shoot like turrets from a stationary position. The Game Boy version is a strategy game where all fighting is done in an arcade manner rather than a typical manner of a strategy or role-playing game. Each player must either destroy all of the opponent's units or capture all the castles in order to win the game and to defeat his or her opponent. Winning results in a celebration screen while losing is the equivalent to a game over.

=== DVD releases ===
BCI Eclipse LLC (under its Ink & Paint classic animation entertainment brand) (under license from Hearst Entertainment and SGC Entertainment) released the complete series on DVD for the very first time, in 2006/2007, in 2 volume sets. Each set consists of 5 double-sided DVDs, with extras including cast/crew voiceover commentaries and bonus video interviews with the cast and show writers. As of 2009, these releases have been discontinued and are out of print as BCI Eclipse ceased operations.

Mill Creek Entertainment released Prince Valiant: The Complete 65 Episode Series on DVD in Region 1 on May 18, 2010. This 5-disc set features all 65 episodes of the series on DVD, together in one collection for the very first time.

In May 2004, MBL Group subsidiary Hollywood DVD released 2 episodes (The Dream and The Journey) on a single, all-region disc for the British market: The Legend Of Prince Valiant: The Dream ∙ The Journey.
