= Adaptations of Puss in Boots =

Adaptations of a fairy tale about a cat

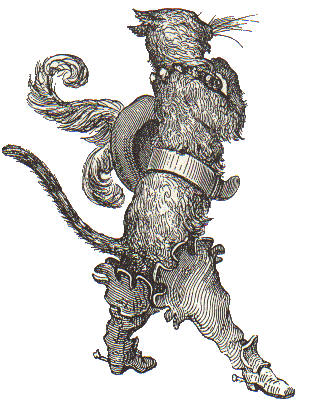
Gustave Doré's 19th-century engraving of le chat botté

Puss is a character in the fairy tale The Master Cat, or Puss in Boots by Charles Perrault. The tale was published in 1697 in his Histoires ou contes du temps passé. The tale of a cat helping an impoverished master attain wealth through its trickery is known in hundreds of variants.

- Gustave Doré created an illustrated version.
- In 1797 the German writer Ludwig Tieck published Puss in Boots, a dramatic satire based on the Puss in Boots tale.
- In 1904 English artist Louis Wain created an illustrated version titled The Marvelous Story of Puss in Boots.
- The Russian composer César Cui (of French ancestry) composed a short children's opera on this subject in 1913. Puss in Boots was first performed in Rome in 1915, and has been something of a repertory item in Germany since at least the 1970s.
- In 1922 Walt Disney created a black-and-white silent short of the same name.
- Xavier Montsalvatge composed a children's opera, El gato con botas, with libretto by Néstor Luján; it was first performed in Barcelona Gran Teatre del Liceu in 1947. It has been performed for children several times, in Spain, but also in Germany, Czech Republic, Australia, and New York.
- In their album of cat songs, Happy Times Records included a version of Puss in Boots. As with their version of Pied Piper of Hamelin, it is not faithful to the original fairy tale and features a cat named Puss in Boots who is the guardian of his native village. He saves the village from several invasions by using his head and is summoned by the song, "Come, boots!/Come, boots!/Come a runnin'/Puss in Boots". The man and woman who perform this story/song are the same ones who perform Happy Times's version of The Pied Piper, and the number ends with the words, "The whole village is proud of their magical cat!"
- A 1961 Mexican adaptation is called El gato con botas. K. Gordon Murray distributed it in the United States as Puss in Boots. Puss was portrayed by Santanon.
- In 1969, Toei Animation produced the film The Wonderful World of Puss 'n Boots, directed by Kimio Yabuki, with a screenplay by Hisashi Inoue, and animation supervision by Yasuji Mori. Its main character, the cat Pero, was very popular and eventually became Toei's mascot. Puss is voiced by Susumu Ishikawa and Gilbert Mack in English version. A video game based on the film's character Pero and a third film Puss n' Boots Travels Around the World, Nagagutsu o Haita Neko: Sekai Isshū 80 Nichi Dai Bōken (Puss n' Boots: Pero's Great Adventure), was released in 1986.
- Rankin/Bass Animated Entertainment produced a hand-drawn animated TV special in 1972 entitled Puss in Boots.
- The Master Cat by David Garnett is a novel first published in 1974 which gives a more detailed account of the established story from Puss getting the boots to his eating the ogre. The second part of the book tells of Puss getting caught up in palace plots and intrigues of which he ultimately becomes the victim, by his own ungrateful master no less.
- In 1985, a television series titled Faerie Tale Theatre produced a live-action adaptation starring Ben Vereen as Puss and Gregory Hines as the miller's son.
- In an episode of Monty Python's Flying Circus, a sketch set in the Police Department of the State of Venezuela is interrupted by an unexpected adaptation of Puss in Boots done in the style of a Christmas pantomime.
- An episode of Garfield and Friends adapted the story with Garfield in the role of the cat, and his owner, Jon Arbuckle in the role of his owner. The episode is titled "Puss in High-Tops", however, as instead of boots, the cat requests of pair of High-tops. This is because at the end, instead of tricking the ogre to turn into a mouse, he tricks him into turning into a cockroach, which he uses the high-tops to step on him. In the end, he charges his owner for his services and gets chased by the ogre who wants revenge after turning back from a cockroach.
- A live-action direct-to-video film adaptation was made in 1988, starring Christopher Walken as Puss and Jason Connery as the miller's son.
- Enoki Films released a Japanese animated series called Nagagutsu wo Haita Neko no Bouken (Adventures of Puss-in-Boots) in 1992. Puss is voiced by Yasunori Matsumoto.
- Puss by Esther Friesner, in Snow White, Blood Red (edited by Ellen Datlow and Terri Windling) retells the story.
- Plaza Entertainment released an animated direct-to-video film called Puss in Boots in 1999. Puss is voiced by Michael York.
- Puss in Boots appears as a character in the films Shrek 2 and Shrek the Third (voiced by Antonio Banderas). The character is originally recruited as a swashbuckling professional ogre killer who is an obvious parody of Banderas' famous role as Zorro. Puss later becomes a sidekick to the ogre Shrek, and in the alternative world in Shrek Forever After, because Rumpelstiltskin erased the day Shrek was born when he was made to sign a contract, Puss is seen to have retired from fencing and grown fat as Fiona's pet. A self-titled spin-off film was released in 2011, followed by a sequel Puss in Boots: The Last Wish in 2022. Puss in Boots, a video game based on the film, was released in 2011. He was also the star of the 2015 animated series The Adventures of Puss in Boots.
- In the furry comic book, Xanadu, the main male hero, Tabbe Le Fauve, is a cat modeled on Puss in Boots with a strong influence of Errol Flynn's typical swashbuckler character.
- The webcomic No Rest for the Wicked features several characters adapted from this story, such as Perrault (Puss), the Marquis de Carabas, and his wife.
- HBO's Happily Ever After: Fairy Tales for Every Child gave the story a Polynesian flavor.
- Angela Carter offers an alternative, updated version of the tale in her collection of short stories The Bloody Chamber.
- In the Pokémon anime series, the character Tyson owns a Meowth that dresses up like Puss in Boots; this Meowth is his main Pokémon.
- In Gainax's 2000 anime FLCL, the third episode is named "Maru Raba" ("Marquis de Carabas") and deals with the young adult characters performing Puss in Boots at their school.
- "The New Traveller's Almanac", a companion to Alan Moore and Kevin O'Neill's The League of Extraordinary Gentlemen, places Carabas Castle (formerly Ogre Castle, where "a talking feline dressed in smashing footwear" ate the Ogre and inherited his riches) in Ardennes on the Belgian border, where also stood (among others) the castles of Bluebeard, the Beast and Rosamund. These castles were subsequently destroyed by shellfire in 1913 during the Great War.
- In Neil Gaiman's novel Neverwhere, the Marquis de Carabas appears as a character and is merged with Puss.
- The novel Reserved for the Cat by Mercedes Lackey is a retelling of Puss in Boots, set in her Elemental Masters series.
- In the manga MÄR, Puss in Boots becomes a form of Babbo in the final battle against the main antagonist named Phantom.
- "Puss in Boots" is the fourth episode of the episode game series American McGee's Grimm, which features the dark version of the cat missing an eye and the queen rabbit in the dark version goes from an easter bunny type creature to a rabbit inspired by the Xenomorph from the Alien franchise.
- The Captain N: The Game Master episode "Once Upon a Time Machine" is based on Puss 'n Boots (though it mostly draws its inspiration from a video game adaptation of Toei's anime film).
- La Véritable histoire du Chat botté (2009) is an animated French film by Jérôme Deschamps, Pascal Hérold and Macha Makeïeff. Dubbed into English as The True History of Puss 'N Boots (2010), Puss in Boots was voiced by Richard Dumont in Canadian/UK version and William Shatner in US version.
- Puss in Boots appears in the Fables spin-off Cinderella: From Fabletown with Love. He is one of the animal Fables who live on Fabletown's "Farm".
- Mary Hanson Roberts wrote and drew a comic book titled Furrlough, about the descendants of Puss in Boots and their adventures in their world's equivalent of the France of Louis XVI and the French Revolution, called "Here Comes a Candle". The reference in the title is to the nursery rhyme that ends: "Here comes a candle to light you to bed; here comes a chopper to chop off your head".
- Puss in Boots is the main character of video game Puss in Boots: Fear Not Hooman, developed by Adana Softworks and released in 2019.
- Puss In Boots: A Musical is a 2019 audiobook musical created by Edelman and Fishman and Khristine Hvam and released by HarperAudio. It is narrated by Jim Dale and features a full ensemble.
- A version of Puss in Boots is one of the main characters in Neverafter, the fifteenth season of the web series Dimension 20. He is played by Zac Oyama.
- Puss in Boots appears in the animated series Kuba and Sruba by Studio Filmów Rysunkowych, titled "Cichomaniak".
