= Dual Heroes =

1997 video game

- North American Nintendo 64 cover art
- Developer: Produce!
- Publishers: ^{JP} Hudson Soft^{NA} Electro Brain^{PAL} Gaga Interactive Media
- Director: Keita Amemiya
- Artist: Tamotsu Shinohara (character design)
- Writer: Keita Amemiya
- Platform: Nintendo 64
- Release: JP: December 5, 1997; PAL: April 12, 1998; NA: November 5, 1998
- Genre: Fighting
- Modes: Single-player, multiplayer

Dual Heroes (デュアルヒーローズ, Dyuaru Hīrōzu) is a fighting game for Nintendo 64. The game was developed by Produce! and published by Hudson Soft in Japan, Electro Brain in North America and Gaga Interactive Media in Europe.

== Gameplay ==
Dual Heroes has a "medal match" where players can win a medal, either from an A.I. opponent or from another player.

== Story ==
120 years ago, in preparation for the coming doom, mankind began an exodus to the manmade satellites in outer space. But the "Day of Judgment" arrived even before half the population had escaped to space. The shift in the tectonic plate caused the shape of the Pacific Ocean to change and a new continent was created.

After 100 years, the only inhabitable areas were limited to the area around the new Pacific Ocean and the new continent. New nations were founded on this continent and mankind began rebuilding their lives. In the midst of rebuilding, "Gaiathyst" a mineral which releases an energy similar to gravity was discovered as a new source of endless energy.

The nations began to war with each other for domination, but conventional weapons were found useless due to the influence of the Gaiathyst. To fight under these conditions, the power suits used to mine Gaiathyst were improved for combat. But the "Gaiathyst War" came to an abrupt end by the invading forces of the Zodgierra Empire from outer space.

After conquering the nations, Emperor ZORR creates the "SAP", a super gravity producing device. Orbiting over the new continent, the super gravity of the device, prohibits beings not wearing a power suit to exist under it. Protected by the super gravity, ZORR commands his empire from a tower under the SAP.

A few brave make a stand to defeat ZORR. They are the true Heroes.

== Development ==
Dual Heroes was developed by Produce! It was the first fighting game to use analog controls. Hudson Soft programmed multiple AIs for each character, in an effort to imitate different players controlling the character on different occasions, and thereby make the game's single-player mode more closely emulate the multiplayer fighting game experience.

The game was shown at E3 1997, being 70% completed. A complete build was later shown at the 1997 Nintendo Space World.

== Reception ==
Reception

Aggregate score
| Aggregator | Score |
|---|---|
| GameRankings | 40% |

Review scores
| Publication | Score |
|---|---|
| Consoles + | 86% |
| Electronic Gaming Monthly | 2.875/10 (Note: In Electronic Gaming Monthly's review of the game, one critic gave it 4.5/10, two of them gave it each a score of 3/10, and another gave it 1/10.) |
| Famitsu | 28/40 |
| GameSpot | 3.7/10 |
| Hyper | 49% |
| IGN | 2.8/10 |
| Joypad | 14% |
| N64 Magazine | (EU) 50% (JP) 28% |
| Nintendo Power | 6.6/10 |

The game received unfavorable reviews according to the review aggregation website GameRankings. In Japan, however, Famitsu gave it a score of 28 out of 40.

It was often mocked and criticized for its gameplay, controls and fighting mechanics, it took out the title of "Worst Game Ever" when a poll was run by an Australian Nintendo magazine Nintendo Gamer (formerly N64 Gamer). The game's poor quality was attributed in part to the poor AI, which often sent your enemy running with a devil-may-care attitude over the edge of precipices and to their deaths in chase of the player's character.

Dual Heroes makes the N64 look so bad, it could easily be a system seller -- meaning N64 owners selling their systems to get a PSX or a Saturn.

— IGN's Peer Schneider.

A reviewer for GameSpot declared the game to be one of the worst fighting games for home consoles.

One writer for Nintendo Power commented that the game did not add much to the fighting game genre.

== See also ==
- List of fighting games
