= The Tale of Kitty-in-Boots =

Children's book by Beatrix Potter

- Front cover, designed by Quentin Blake
- Author: Beatrix Potter
- Illustrator: Quentin Blake
- Language: English
- Genre: Children's literature
- Publisher: Frederick Warne & Co
- Publication date: September 1, 2016
- Publication place: United Kingdom
- Media type: Hardcover
- Pages: 72

The Tale of Kitty-in-Boots is a British children's book written by Beatrix Potter and illustrated by Quentin Blake published in 2016. The manuscript was discovered by Jo Hanks, a publisher at Penguin Random House Children's Books, in the Victoria and Albert Museum archive in 2015.

== Development ==
Potter sent the manuscript to her publisher in 1914 and mentioned in letters that she intended to complete it; however, her work was interrupted by the outbreak of World War I and personal events such as her marriage and illness.

The book was published on 1 September 2016 (ISBN 978-0241247594) by Frederick Warne & Co, the publisher of Potter's other works, which since 1983 has been an imprint of Penguin Group. The publication coincided with the 150th anniversary of Potter's birth.

== Plot ==
The story centres around "a well-behaved prime black Kitty cat, who leads rather a double life", and includes characters from other Potter stories, including Peter Rabbit, and Mrs. Tiggy-Winkle.

== See also ==
- Puss in Boots (disambiguation)
