= Boxing (1990 video game) =

1990 video game

- Japanese cover art
- Developer(s): Tose
- Publisher(s): JP: Tonkin House; NA: Activision
- Platform(s): Game Boy
- Release: JP: May 18, 1990; NA: September 1990
- Genre(s): Fighting, sports (boxing)
- Mode(s): Single-player, multiplayer

Boxing (ボクシング) (known in North America as Heavyweight Championship Boxing) is a boxing video game, developed by Tose and published by Tonkin House which was released in 1990.

Once the player chooses a boxer, the other challengers must be defeated in order to gain the title. Points can be distributed and re-distributed on the fighter's health meter, stamina, and how fast he moves around in the ring. Either uppercuts or normal punches can be used to wear down the opponent in the game.

== See also ==
- Sports Collection
