= Vortex (video game) =

1994 video game

- North American cover art by Roger Loveless
- Developer: Argonaut Software
- Publishers: NA: Electro Brain; JP: Pack-In-Video; PAL: Sony Imagesoft
- Producer: Neil Jackson
- Designers: Nic Cusworth; Michael Powell
- Programmer: Michael Powell
- Artist: Alistair McNally
- Composer: Justin Scharvona
- Platform: Super Nintendo Entertainment System
- Release: NA: September 1994; JP: December 9, 1994; PAL: 1995
- Genre: 3D shooter
- Mode: Single-player

Vortex is a 3D shooter game developed by Argonaut Software and released by Electro Brain for the Super Nintendo Entertainment System in September 1994. Titled Citadel during development, it is one of a few games designed to use the enhanced graphics of the Super FX powered GSU-1.

== Gameplay ==
Gameplay screenshot

The player pilots an experimental mech called the Morphing Battle System against the five worlds of the Aki-Do Forces. The player enters the Vortex, to save the Deoberon system, retrieving the core from the fierce forces, the Aki-Do. The MBS can transform between four different modes: The Walker, Sonic Jet, Land Burner, and Hard Shell.

== Development and release ==
The overall concept of Vortex fueled unconfirmed speculation that the project may have been derived from an unreleased game based on Transformers, but in a 2015 interview with Retro Gamer, programmer Michael Wong-Powell confirmed that Vortex and Transformers were entirely separate projects, with the latter being cancelled during development.

In March 1994, Argonaut Software was signed as a third-party developer by Atari Corporation to develop games for the Atari Jaguar platform. A port of Vortex for the Jaguar was announced at Spring ECTS '94, but it ultimately was never released.

== Reception ==
Reception

Review scores
Publication	Score
AllGame	2.5/5
Computer and Video Games	89/100
Electronic Gaming Monthly	7/10, 8/10, 4/10, 5/10, 6/10
Famitsu	6/10, 5/10, 6/10, 5/10
Game Informer	7.5/10
Game Players	74%
GameFan	79/100, 72/100, 70/100
Hyper	80/100
Nintendo Life	7/10
Official Nintendo Magazine	93/100
Super Play	90%
Total!	(UK) 85/100 (DE) 4+
Electronic Games	B
Games World	75/100
Nintendo Magazine System	94/100
Super Gamer	92/100
Ultimate Future Games	74%
VideoGames	8/10

Vortex received generally favorable reception from critics. Electronic Gaming Monthly's five editors remarked that the pace is slow, but complimented the unique concept and high challenge.
