= Mouse Trap Hotel =

1992 video game

- Promotional flyer
- Developer: Imagineering
- Publisher: Electro Brain
- Designer: Mark Klein
- Artist: Mike Sullivan
- Composer: Mark van Hecke
- Platform: Game Boy
- Release: 1992
- Genre: Action
- Mode: Single-player

Mouse Trap Hotel is an action video game for the Nintendo Game Boy. It is loosely based on Milton Bradley's board game Mouse Trap.

== Summary ==
External videos
- Video of the Game Boy video game Mouse Trap Hotel

The object of this game is to take Maxie the Mouse as he tries to visit his girlfriend. Unfortunately, she is located in a penthouse while Maxie dwells in the basement. By finding the exit in each level, he draws closer to being with his girlfriend. Side-scrolling segments with some vertical elements are an expected part of the game. Getting hit by mousetraps and enemies causes Maxie to lose his energy. As expected with most platform games, getting hit too frequently causes the player to lose a life. Maxie's tail comes in handy when it comes to destroying enemies.

Each floor has its own obstacles; which range from mattress springs in the bedroom to dancing legs at the ballroom. Players must ride an elevator to each new floor where dangers constantly lurk about in places like the kitchen and the gymnasium.
