= Fist of the North Star: 10 Big Brawls for the King of the Universe =

1989 video game

Fist of the North Star: 10 Big Brawls for the King of Universe
- Developer: Shouei System
- Publisher: US: Electro Brain
- Series: Fist of the North Star
- Platform: Game Boy
- Release: JP: December 22, 1989; US: April 1990
- Genre: Fighting
- Modes: Single-player, multiplayer

Fist of the North Star: 10 Big Brawls for the King of Universe (Note: Japanese: 北斗の拳 凄絶十番勝負, Hepburn: Hokuto no kobushi seizetsu jū ban shōbu; lit. 'Fist of the North Star: Ten Fierce Battles') is a 1989 video game for the Game Boy. It is based on the Fist of the North Star series, which debuted as a serialized manga in Japan in 1983. The game involves characters from the series battling after the events of a nuclear war, with each trying to defeat the others to decide the fate of what was left of the Earth.

Fist of the North Star was the first fighting game released for the Game Boy. It features a normal mode where different characters fight each other one-on-one, exchanging blows until one character's power meter is drained. Players can gain experience points to boost their chosen characters defencsive and attack stats to use in the other modes, such as two-player versus modes.

Following Fist of the North Star (1987) for the Nintendo Entertainment System, it was the second game in the series to maintain its name when released in the West. While Amstar magazine in France complimented its gameplay and graphics, reviews in Famicom Tsūshin and later from Allgame found it lacking in terms of graphics and gameplay.

== Plot ==
Fist of the North Star: 10 Big Brawls for the King of Universe is set after a nuclear war has left the world in chaos. This has led to leaders of various factions scrambling for power. Among them is Kenshiro, who hopes to defeat the rest of them with the ultimate goal of rebuilding civilization. Others ultimately seek the goal of reigning over what is left of the Earth.

After defeating all the other combatants in normal mode, a text delivers the message "Congratulation!"

== Gameplay ==
There are three gameplay modes in Fist of the North Star: normal, versus, and team mode. In normal mode, the player chooses one character and faces ten computer-controlled challengers. The player can build each warrior's strength and experience levels by winning battles, allowing them to become stronger. This powered-up character can then be used in versus and team modes. Stats that can be gained in battle include attack and defence power as well as general experience points. In this mode, two players each select a team of five characters and then go into a round robin fight where the player who has their last character still standing wins.

In normal mode, the player's character energy is restored when they finish a battle. If they win, they move on to the next opponent. If the player loses, they can either continue or quit. On continuing the return to the same battle against the same opponent, with their health restored. During battles, the upper-left corners of the screen display the Energy meter for the player on the left and the enemy on the right. Their attack power meter will be displayed below the energy meter. In versus mode, two players compete against each other via the Game Link Cable accessory. In team mode, the player creates a team of five characters to take on the other characters.

The playable characters include Kenshiro, Heart, Shin, Jagi, Uygur, Souther, Raoh, Falco, Han, Hyou, and Kaioh. The player can move their character left and right across the screen. Each character has their own abilities. While most characters can jump and kneel, others, such as Heart and Uygur cannot.

== Development and release ==
Fist of the North Star: 10 Big Brawls for the King of Universe draws its characters and themes from the manga and anime series Fist of the North Star, which was first published in 1983. It was serialized in Japan's Shōnen Jump, which as of 2012, was the best-selling manga magazine. Along with the other Jump title, Dragon Ball, it was one of the two manga series that were originally serialized in the magazine that received a video game adaptation in 1986.

Fist of the North Star: 10 Big Brawls for the King of Universe was developed by Shouei System. It was released for the Game Boy in Japan on December 22, 1989. It was the first fighting game released for the Game Boy. Viz Media had just published the Fist of the North Star manga for the American market in the same year.

At the 1990 Winter Consumer Electronics Show (CES) in Las Vegas, Electro Brain, then a new licensee, showcased Fist of the North Star for Game Boy along with the Nintendo Entertainment System game Puss N Boots: Pero's Great Adventure (1986). It was shown again at the 1990 Summer CES alongside another Game Boy game, Dead Heat Scramble (1990).

It was released in the United States in April 1990. While there were several games based on Fist of the North Star, along with Fist of the North Star (1987), it was only the second game to maintain its Fist of the North Star name in the West.

== Reception ==
Reception

Review scores
Publication	Score
Allgame	1.5/5
Amstar	12/20
Famicom Tsūshin	5/10, 5/10, 6/10, 3/10

From contemporary reviews, the French magazine Amstar complimented the game's sharp graphics but said that its good gameplay overall was appreciated. In the book Game Player's Encyclopedia of Game Boy Games (1990), the author found the graphics "somewhat of a disappointment," noting the single line of text as a reward for beating the game. The four reviewers Famicom Tsūshin discussed the game. While two suggested it may be fun for fans of the series, one said that the appeal of them said the appeal of the series was its unique characters, which was hard to present via the Game Boy hardware.

While one Famicom Tsūshin reviewer was surprised to find such an action-oriented game for the Game Boy, another complimented the ability to level up the character, and another found the gameplay in general to be limited.

From retrospective reviews, Chris Scullion in his book The Game Boy Encyclopedia said that the game's fighting gameplay was very basic. Joe Ottson of Allgame also remarked that the game had stiff control and a lack of balance between the characters. Ottson said that there was a "completely astounding lack of effort put into the graphical side of the game", finding the characters small and poorly-animated while their projectiles were basic square and teardrop shapes.

== See also ==
- List of Game Boy games
- List of video games based on anime or manga
