= Kwirk =

1989 video game

- North American Game Boy cover art
- Developer: Atlus
- Publishers: JP: Atlus; NA: Acclaim Entertainment; EU: Nintendo
- Composer: Tsukasa Masuko
- Platforms: Game Boy, Famicom Disk System, PC Engine
- Release: Game Boy: JP: November 24, 1989; NA: March 1990; EU: 1990; Famicom Disk System: JP: November 16, 1990; PC Engine: JP: February 22, 1991
- Genre: Puzzle
- Modes: Single-player, multiplayer

Kwirk, known in Japan as Puzzle Boy (パズルボーイ, Pazurubōi), is a puzzle video game developed and published by Atlus in Japan on November 24, 1989, for the Game Boy. It was the very first video game Atlus released under its own brand. The game was later published in North America in March 1990 by Acclaim Entertainment.

== Plot ==
Kwirk and his girlfriend Tammy were both out "painting the town red" when they decided to explore the unnamed city's subterranean labyrinth below. While down there, Tammy suddenly disappears and Kwirk, with his Veggie Friends, now has to find her in the labyrinth and bring her home.

In the original Japanese version of the game, the player character is an anthropomorphized potato called Spud. This was changed to a tomato named Kwirk for the US release. In both releases, the character Kwirk has set out to save is a tomato.

== Gameplay ==
Kwirk has three game modes: Going Up?, Heading Out?, and Vs. Mode, each one with its own set of rules. The object is to get from one end of the room to the staircase on the other by rotating turnstiles, moving blocks, and filling holes with blocks.

The game has three skill levels: Level 1 - Easy, Level 2 - Average and Level 3 - Hard. One of two viewpoints may be selected: Diagonal or Bird's Eye. In Diagonal view, characters and blocks have shadows and appear in crude 3D, whereas in Bird's Eye view everything is 2D, viewed from the top down. The three skill levels and two viewpoints are featured in all three game modes.

=== Going Up? ===
In "Going Up?" the object is to go from floor to floor by rotating turnstiles, moving blocks, and filling holes with blocks to get to the staircase on the other side. There are ten floors for each Skill Level for a total of thirty floors. Along the way at certain levels, Kwirk will receive help from his Veggie Friends, who can be taken control of by pressing the Select button. The Going Up? game mode offers a menu screen (upon a press of the A button) that allows the following:

- Redo – Restart the entire stage from the beginning.
- End – Return to the menu.
- Back – Undo the last move made, up to eight times.

Scoring is based on the time taken to complete the stage and the number of steps taken to get to the stairs.

Going Up? serves as the story in which Kwirk has to rescue Tammy from the maze. Although the game features no storyline to progress the game, each stage ends with Tammy displaying the score, and after ten floors to each Level, Tammy and Kwirk are reunited.

=== Heading Out? ===
In "Heading Out?" the object is to complete a certain number of rooms consecutively to get a high score. There are a total of 99 rooms, any of which can be selected to run through by the player. Once started, the player sprints through each room solving the puzzle. Bonus Points are earned upon completion of each room. The Bonus Points start at 2000, decreasing during the course of the room, and resets after entering a new room. A timer is included to track the time through the course. After running through all the rooms the player's score is then recorded on a top four list.

=== Vs. Mode ===
Vs. Mode is a race using Heading Out? mode between two players. Each player selects a number of rooms to race through, but both player do not have to select the same number of rooms as a handicap. Then a Contest is selected to decide the win condition: 1 Game playoff, or a Best of 3, 5, 7, or 9. Once started, the players can monitor each other through a Progress meter on their respective screens. The match ends when one player completes all the rooms.

=== Obstacles ===
In each room, Kwirk must navigate around and interact with various obstacles in order to progress.

Obstacles:

- Brick walls cannot be moved nor walked through. Brick walls must be maneuvered around and blocks must be pushed around them.
- Turnstiles are blocks set on an axis that turn 90 degrees when pushed by a character. They come in single, double, triple, and quadruple variations. They cannot turn if something is blocking their radius of movement.
- Blocks are basic blocks of various sizes. They can be pushed by characters and may block paths necessary for a character to reach the stairs. Blocks can also fill holes to allow characters to walk past.
- Holes can not be walked over. Instead, blocks can be used to fill holes or characters must maneuver around the holes.

=== Kwirk’s Veggie Friends ===
At certain points in the game "Going Up?", one or all of Kwirk's Veggie Friends will appear to help. They do not have special abilities, but instead play exactly like Kwirk to allow maneuvers that are not possible with only one character. The player switches between characters by pressing the select button and all of the Veggie Friends must be brought to the stairs to clear the floor.

The Veggie Friends:

- Curly Carrot
- Eddie Eggplant
- Pete the Pepper
- Sass the Squash

== Reception ==
Reception

Review scores
Publication	Score
Electronic Gaming Monthly	6/10, 3/10, 5/10, 6/10
GameSpot	7.5/10.0
Mean Machines	85%
Video Games (German)	85%
Console XS	81%

Kwirk received largely positive reviews. Reviewers praised the game's challenging difficulty. According to Mean Machines, which rated the game a score of 85%, Kwirk is one of the "simple, but very addictive" puzzle games, as stated by Julian Rignall. Because of the number of different screens, it doesn't "become boring quickly". Rignall stated the game gets "incredibly hard" and "really taxes" the player's brain. Matt Regan criticized that once the player has solved each puzzle, there is "no interest left". The German magazine Video Games reviewed Kwirk in its first issue and awarded it a "Video Games Classic" due to a score of 85%. The magazine's editor Stephan Englhart praised the game's variety of modes and puzzles. He stated that Kwirk captivates with a "well-elaborated and harmonious overall concept" ("wohl durchdachtes und stimmiges Gesamtkonzept"). Console XS gave review score of 81% and described the gameplay as "pleasing and occasionally confounding" and opined that Kwirk is one of the best puzzle games. Writing for MSX Magazine in 1989, a reviewer considered the Game Boy version of Puzzle Boy to be a slightly easier adaptation of the MSX game Maze-kun (めいず君), yet equally addictive.

== Ports and sequels ==
A port for the Famicom Disk System was released on November 16, 1990, and a port for the PC Engine on February 22, 1991. These versions were only released in Japan, and retain the potato protagonist of the Japanese Game Boy version.

A spin-off called Spud's Adventure, known as Totsugeki! Valetions in Japan, was released for the Game Boy in 1991. It was published by Atlus in the U.S. instead of Acclaim. Unlike the first game, Atlus did not change the protagonist into a tomato, but left him as his original character of a potato. Unlike Puzzle Boy, it is an action/adventure game.

A second sequel Amazing Tater (known in Japan as Puzzle Boy II) also for the Game Boy was released later in 1991 in Japan, and in 1992 in the US. Like Spud's Adventure, the protagonist remains a potato called "Spud". It retains much of the gameplay of the first game.

In October 2018, the original game's North American publishing rights were acquired by Canadian production company Liquid Media Group along with other titles originally released by Acclaim.

== In other media ==
Kwirk's only appearance outside of the Game Boy game was on the television show Video Power, as part of a 15-minute cartoon short called The Power Team, which featured characters from Acclaim games.
