= Operation Logic Bomb =

1993 video game

- North American cover art
- Developer: Jaleco
- Publisher: Jaleco
- Designers: Yasuo Igakura; Yutaka Sakashita
- Artists: M. Matsuda; Tomoji Omotani; M. Shimura
- Composer: Yasuyuki Suzuki
- Platform: Super NES/Famicom
- Release: JP: April 23, 1993; NA: September 1993; EU: 1993
- Genre: Action
- Mode: Single-player

Operation Logic Bomb: The Ultimate Search & Destroy, known in Japan as Ikari no Yōsai (怒りの要塞, "The Fortress of Fury") is a 1993 action video game developed and published by Jaleco for the Super NES/Famicom. It was released in Japan on April 23, 1993, and in North America in September 1993. It is the second sequel to the Game Boy game Fortified Zone, following the Japan-only Game Boy sequel Ikari no Yōsai 2. Although the Japanese version shares the same title as the original Game Boy game, it is not a remake. It was later re-released as BS Ikari no Yōsai on the Satellaview system. Operation Logic Bomb was added to the Nintendo Classics service in May 2020.

== Gameplay ==
Bits of virtual reality (blue dots) are corrupting reality (represented by the rest of the base).

The player has to liberate a secret futuristic laboratory dealing with interdimensional physics from monsters that escaped through a rip in the dimensional fabric of space and time. There are many robots and big bosses to fight as the main character liberates his comrades from being trapped inside sections of reality that are turned into a representation of the virtual world.

Controlling a cybernetic soldier, the player starts out with two basic weapons and gains more as he progresses throughout the game. Computer memory banks will permit the player to tap into memories in order to solve the problem once and for all. All of the weapons are essential if the player wishes to beat the game. Enemies include common soldiers, cannon launchers, giant flying robots, and the low amount of continues (3) allowed.

== Plot ==
A group of people have joint ambitions to establish an unprecedented scientific theory. They called it the "crystalline substance transfer theory in dimensional physics." This helped to accomplish the rapid progress in recent years. The fear of leaks of confidential material is a huge expense that the leaders could not possibly afford. As a result, all the research was done on expansive grounds in a nationally sponsored facility that was built behind the rocks.

However, because the near future also demands practical research, the people lost contact with the scientists working at the facility. Defense forces are immediately dispatched to an elite survey of troops. A sky reconnaissance plane was shot down last; forcing the area to go into a state of emergency.

== Reception ==
Reception

Review scores
Publication	Score
AllGame	3.5/5
Computer and Video Games	85/100
Electronic Gaming Monthly	6/10, 8/10, 8/10, 9/10
Famitsu	6/10, 4/10, 6/10, 7/10
GamesMaster	78%
Hyper	78%
Official Nintendo Magazine	84/100
Super Play	68%
Total!	3
Marukatsu Super Famicom	7/10, 8/10, 6/10, 7/10
Super Action	82%
Super Control	61%
Super Gamer	60%
Super Pro	60/100

Operation Logic Bomb received a 18.19/30 score in a 1993 readers' poll conducted by Super Famicom Magazine, ranking among Super Famicom titles at the number 274 spot. The game received mixed reviews from critics.
