= Fortified Zone 2 =

1992 video game

- English box art
- Developer: Jaleco
- Publisher: Jaleco
- Platform: Game Boy
- Release: JP: February 21, 1992; EU: June 3, 2025
- Genre: Top-down shooter
- Modes: Single-player, multiplayer

Fortified Zone 2 (Note: Japanese: 怒りの要塞2, Hepburn: Ikari no Yōsai 2; lit. 'Fortress of Fury 2') is a 1992 top-down shooter video game developed and published by Jaleco for the Game Boy. A direct sequel to Fortified Zone (1991), it follows the two mercenaries, Masato Kanzaki and Mizuki Makimura, on a new mission to take down a new weapon that their enemies have. The game features similar gameplay to the original game, with players going through four levels, all while dealing with enemies and traps.

Initially only released in Japan on February 21, 1992, the game was published by the French-based Broke Studio for an English-language release on June 3, 2025. Original reviews were lukewarm, with reviewers complimenting the graphics, but finding that the only thing improved upon the original was the graphics; it was hurt by slow-paced character movement and a lack of innovation from the original.

== Gameplay ==
Fortified Zone 2 takes place after the events of the first game, Fortified Zone (1991). It has the two mercenaries, Masato Kanzaki and Mizuki Makimura, on a new mission to take down a new weapon that their enemies have.

The game has the player controlling the characters through four stages avoiding enemies and traps. Like in Fortified Zone, the player can switch between the two mercenaries. The characters can equip various weapons to vary how they shoot, such as rapid-fire machine guns, a three-way shot called 3WAY, and a grenade launcher.

== Release and reception ==
Reception

Review scores
Publication	Score
Famitsu	5/10, 5/10, 6/10, 6/10
Joypad	70%
Power Play	70%
Video Games	68%

Fortified Zone 2 was released in Japan for the Game Boy on February 21, 1992. It was re-released digitally in Japan for the Nintendo 3DS's Virtual Console on January 11, 2012.

Initially never released outside of Japan, Fortified Zone 2 was released in West on June 3rd, 2025, by the French studio Broke Studio. Broke Studio's release of Fortified Zone 2 made it the first commercial European release with an English translation and enhancements.

General reception from contemporary video game magazines ranged from Michael Paul of Video Games finding the game to be solid, to a reviewer in Famitsu saying there was nothing particularly poor about the game, but nothing particularly special either. Olivier Prezeau of Joypad wrote that they expected more from a sequel as there were not any major differences between this game and the first Fortified Zone. Two reviewers in Famitsu found the playable characters and enemies moved too slowly.

Reviewers in Famitsu said the game lacked varied enemies and gameplay mechanics, which led to new levels and a low amount of enemies becoming monotonous. Prezeau wrote that while the game was not just mindless action, it did not grab their attention either. They suggested playing the game in two-player mode, as that is what made the game the most engaging. Power Play reviewer Knut Gollert said that despite the somewhat tired gameplay concepts, Fortified Zone 2's detailed graphics and puzzles managed to make the game fun.

Reviewers in Famitsu and Joypad praised the game's graphics, with Prezeau saying they had improved upon the original game.

== See also ==
- List of Game Boy games
