= Lists of Game Boy games =

Lists of Game Boy games cover video games developed for Nintendo's original Game Boy and for other platforms in the Game Boy family.

- List of Game Boy games, for the original Game Boy
- List of Game Boy Color games for games supporting the additional features of the Game Boy Color system
- List of Game Boy Advance games
- List of Super Game Boy games for games supporting the additional features of the Super Game Boy peripheral
- List of multiplayer Game Boy games
- List of best-selling Game Boy video games
