= Stanley: The Search for Dr. Livingston =

1992 video game

- Box art
- Developer(s): Sculptured Software
- Publisher(s): Electro Brain
- Designer(s): Joe Hitchens
- Programmer(s): Ken Moore
- Artist(s): Joe Hitchens
- Composer(s): Paul Webb
- Platform(s): NES
- Release: NA: October 1992
- Genre(s): Action-adventure
- Mode(s): Single-player

Stanley: The Search for Dr. Livingston (after "David Livingstone") is a side-scrolling action-adventure game developed by Sculptured Software and released in 1992 by Electro Brain for the Nintendo Entertainment System. It appeared in one of the first 50 issues of Nintendo Power magazine.

== Summary ==
Stanley tries to fight a cheetah with his bare hands.

The game takes place in the "deepest and darkest" part of Africa during the year 1871. Nations were sending their explorers to uncover the last remaining continent that was not fully mapped by the European superpowers. Dr. Livingston abandoned his original quest to uncover the temple of Am-Zutuk; who was worshipped as a god amongst the indigenous African people. The magic inside this temple is believed to grant its founder amazing wisdom and power. Ghosts and demons haunt the temple making it a tricky venture for any explorer.

The player, as reporter Henry Morton Stanley (after Sir Stanley, 1841-1904), is exploring the last of the mysterious jungle regions for European colonization when his professor, Dr. Livingston (patterned after Dr. David Livingstone, with an ending "e"), gets kidnapped by some African tribesmen. Now the player must explore one of the last uncharted parts of Africa to save his mentor and end an era of exploring Africa. The player is automatically equipped with a gyrocopter to make those tricky landings much smoother.

One of the mentioned places in Africa is Port Harken, which appears as an important "town" level in the game.
