= Boxing Legends of the Ring =

1993 video game

Boxing Legends of the Ring Chavez II Final Knockout
- North American cover art
- Developer: Sculptured Software
- Publishers: NA/EU: Electro Brain; JP: Pack-In-Video
- Designers: Perry Rodgers; Ken Grant; Kenneth Moore
- Composers: Mark Ganus; Dean Morrell
- Platforms: Sega Genesis; Super NES
- Release: Genesis: NA: October 1993; Super NES: NA: October 1993; EU: 1993; JP: November 5, 1993; BR: December 1993
- Genres: Fighting, sports
- Modes: Single-player multiplayer

Boxing Legends of the Ring is a boxing video game for the Sega Genesis and Super NES consoles. The boxers are represented by 2D sprites seen from over the shoulder of one of the fighters. The title of the game refers to the famous boxing magazine, The Ring, which the game is licensed to associate itself with. The following famous middleweight boxers are represented in the game: Sugar Ray Leonard, Roberto Durán, Thomas Hearns, James Toney, Marvin Hagler, Jake LaMotta, Sugar Ray Robinson, and Rocky Graziano.

All of the fights in the game take place in the Las Vegas Hilton casino in the North American version. There are also advertising banners for HBO visible during fights that are not available in the Japanese version. In the Japanese version, the game takes place in a generic boxing ring using the publisher's name in place of the HBO advertisements found in the North American version.

A special version was released in Mexico and the American Southwest called Chavez II; the game exchanged the English language words for Spanish and omitted some vocals.

== Gameplay ==
The skills and attributes of the player

During fights, it is possible to keep track of the participating boxers' wellbeing by observing the small portraits of the fighters' faces at the top of the screen. As the fighters receive punishment, these portraits show injuries such as cuts and bruises, the severity of which indicate the fighter's health (or lack of). There is also a boxing glove shaped meter at the top of the screen, that indicates how much power a boxer has left in his punches (as in a real fight, the more punches boxers throw, the more tired they become, resulting in weaker punches).

The fighters' movement about the ring is limited to side-stepping left or right; it is impossible to step back or forward. A variety of punches can be thrown; left jabs, crosses to the head, hooks to the body, and uppercuts to the head (all punches except jabs can be thrown with either hand). It is also possible to throw a limited number of so-called 'super punches', that are essentially either a right cross or a right uppercut, but with extra power. At the start of each round, each boxer is capable of throwing one super-punch at any time, although it becomes possible to throw one more with each knockdown they score against their opponent. Defensive techniques consist of blocking, dodging, and clinching. Each boxer has three attributes: 'power', 'stamina', and 'chin'.

A scene of one of the boxing matches against Roberto Durán

There are three different modes: 'exhibition', 'career', and 'battle of the legends'. In 'exhibition' mode, a player can choose to fight as any boxer in the game, against any boxer in the game, against either the console or another player. In 'career' mode, a player creates their own boxer, and fights their way through all the boxers in the game, before fighting for the world title. If the player loses once in 'career' mode, he is given a warning that 'game over' would be given for the second loss; giving the player no alternative but to either use a password or start over again with a new boxer.

== Presentation ==
Each fight is seen from behind and slightly to one side of one of the boxers, so that the player appears to be looking over their shoulder, in the direction of their opponent. In the North American version, the blood is colored red while the Japanese version uses sweat instead. This is contrary to Nintendo's then-current censorship policy that blood should never be used in their games. Between each round, girls in bikinis announce the next round by showing a number around the ring (and to the player).

== Reception ==
Reception

Review scores
Publication	Score
Electronic Gaming Monthly	SNES: 23/40
Famitsu	27/40
Game Players	8/10
Next Generation	2/5
Nintendo Power	3.95/5 (Note: Nintendo Power scored Rock n' Roll Racing 3.8/7 for graphics/sound, 3.7/5 for play control, 4/5 for challenge, and 4.3/5 for theme/fun.)
Video Games (DE)	SMD: 66% SNES: 71%
VideoGames & Computer Entertainment	7/10
Mega Action	88%
Mega Power	91%
Super Action	87%
SNES Force	85/100

Reviewing the SNES release as Chavez II, GamePro assessed that while it was not one of the best boxing games for the system, it was a surprisingly strong improvement from the original, with faster controls and sharper, bloodier graphics. They summarized it as "decent".

Next Generation stated that "other than the novely of Spanish text and Chavez on the box, you're just as well off picking up [...] Legends of the Ring." Super Gamer magazine gave the SNES version a review score of 81% stating: "Huge character graphics get you right into the bone-crunching action. Gameplay is somewhat limited, but there is always plenty of challenge and moves."

== See also ==
- List of fighting games
