= Eliminator Boat Duel =

1991 video game

- North American cover art
- Developers: Sculptured Software; Radioactive Software
- Publishers: NA: Electro Brain; EU: Storm
- Designers: Peter Adams; Les Pardew
- Composer: Paul Webb
- Platform: Nintendo Entertainment System
- Release: NA: November 1991; EU: 29 April 1993
- Genre: Racing
- Modes: Single-player, multiplayer

Eliminator Boat Duel is a powerboat racing video game developed for the Nintendo Entertainment System by Sculptured Software and Radioactive Software. It was published by Electro Brain in 1991.

== Gameplay ==
Drivers earn thousands of dollars by competing in powerboat races, setting track records, rescuing stranded people, and collecting cash bonuses. With these winnings they can repair or upgrade various components of the boat to improve racing performance and remain competitive in the increasingly difficult races.

Eliminator Boat Duel offers three difficulty levels: Easy, Normal, and Expert. Completing a race at a lower difficulty level advances the player to the next higher one. At each difficulty level, the player's boat can be damaged from impact with animals, the opponent's watercraft, and various stationary objects. A false start is penalized with a $2,000 fine.

For most of a race, players control their craft from a bird's-eye view, and the screen scrolls in multiple directions, but in one segment of the race, the graphical perspective changes to a third-person tracking mode.

In a single-player game, the player competes first with either Seasick Sidney (in Easy mode), with Aquarius Rex (in Normal mode), or with Surfer Bob (in Expert mode). The sequence of later opponents is Vicious Vicky, Weird Willy, Mangler Mike, Veronica Alabaster, and Disaster Don (the reigning World Champion). To win, the player must defeat each opponent one-against-one on three unique race courses. In all, Eliminator Boat Duel has 24 unique race courses.

== Cartridge and packaging ==
The top edge label on the North American cartridge misspells the game's name as "Elimonator Boat Duel".

== Release ==
Eliminator Boat Duel was added to Nintendo Classics for Nintendo Switch Online subscription service on February 19, 2020. It is available for North America and European regions.

== Reception ==
Reception

Review score
Publication	Score
Nintendo Power	4/5

== See also ==
- R.C. Pro-Am (1988)
- Snake Rattle 'n' Roll (1990)
