= Tony Meola's Sidekicks Soccer =

1993 video game

- North American cover art
- Developer: Sculptured Software
- Publishers: NA: Electro Brain; JP: Pack-In-Video
- Director: Hal Rushton
- Programmers: Mike Spendlove; Alex Dommasch
- Composers: Bob Dayley; Eric Nunamaker; H. Kingsley Thurber
- Platform: Super Nintendo Entertainment System
- Release: NA: November 1993; JP: February 25, 1994
- Genre: Sports (soccer)
- Modes: Single-player, multiplayer

Tony Meola's Sidekicks Soccer is a 1993 soccer video game released for the Super Nintendo Entertainment System. It is named after US goalkeeper Tony Meola. It went under several names in different markets, such as Super Copa in Latin America and Ramos Ruy no World Wide Soccer (ラモス瑠偉のワールドワイドサッカー, Ramosu Rui no Wārudo Waido Sakkā) in Japan (endorsed by Ruy Ramos). In Brazil, there is also a version called Worldwide Soccer, but it is not modified like Super Copa, it is just the same US version.

== Gameplay ==
One of the players is taking the ball down the field for an easy shot opportunity.

The teams in the game include various national teams and some unlicensed club teams from Europe, Japan and America. Players can play with teams from different parts of the United States, including Miami, Los Angeles, and Sacramento.

Mode 7 is used to achieve a pseudo-3D effect similar to that of Sculptured Software's previous NCAA Basketball. There are various options and features, including a variety of soccer formations, corner kicks, curl shots, and the ability to alter each team's roster.

Tony Meola's Sidekicks Soccer encourages passing through a system taken from NCAA Basketball. Players on your team will have a colour above their head indicating their ability to accept a pass. This goes from green, yellow, to red, changing colour as the difficulty of the pass increases.

== Reception ==
Reception

Aggregate score
Aggregator	Score
GameRankings	60.75% (2 reviews)

Review scores
Publication	Score
Electronic Gaming Monthly	5.2/10 (an average from 5 reviews)
Game Players	7/10
GamePro	4.75/5

Allgame would assign this game a rating of 3.5 stars out of 5.

Most reviewers praise the game's Mode 7 graphics. GamePro says "Sidekicks Soccer is the closest you can get to actually being on the field." Electronic Gaming Monthly says the game "adds a new and different perspective", although says it can get "very confusing at times."

Game Players critiques the AI opponents' lack of competent offensive play stating that it "usually sputters and stalls".
