= Ghoul School =

1992 video game

- North American cover art
- Developer: Imagineering
- Publisher: Electro Brain
- Designers: Scott Marshall; Alex Demeo; Garry Kitchen
- Artists: Jesse Kapili; Bill Wentworth
- Composer: Scott Marshall
- Platform: Nintendo Entertainment System
- Release: NA: March 1992
- Genre: Action-adventure
- Mode: Single-player

Ghoul School is an action-adventure video game released for the Nintendo Entertainment System in 1992 by Imagineering. It takes place in a high school which has been overrun by ghosts/demons.

== Gameplay ==
Ghoul School is a side-scrolling action-adventure.

== Plot ==
While taking the usual shortcut home through the cemetery from Cool School High, Senior Spike O'Hara found a strange, glowing skull. He put it in his backpack to show to his anatomy teacher the next day, which happened to be Halloween Eve. When Dr. Femur wanted to keep the skull for a special study, Spike was concerned because it appeared that the skull was bigger than it was the day before. Little did anyone know that the skull had begun transmitting its message to the realm of the dead. The ghouls had begun their assault...

Ghosts/demons have taken over Cool School High. They have turned the teachers and football team into demons. To make matters worse, they have kidnapped Samantha Pompom, the head cheerleader. The player assumes the role of Spike O'Hara as he tries to defeat the ghouls and rescue Samantha. He will have to explore more than 200 rooms and defeat a large number of enemies. There are items and weapons throughout the game that O'Hara can find to defeat the ghouls, though many of these items are well-hidden.

== Reception ==
Reception

Review scores
Publication	Score
AllGame	3/5
Game Players	4/10
Honest Gamers	3/5
Just Games Retro	4/5
The Video Game Critic	F
