= Felix the Cat (video game) =

1992 video game

- North American NES box art
- Developer: Shimada Kikaku
- Publishers: NES: WW: Hudson Soft; Game Boy: NA: Hudson Soft/Electro Brain; EU: Sony Electronic Publishing
- Platforms: NES, Game Boy
- Release: NES: NA: October 1992; EU: 1992; Game Boy: NA: July 1993; EU: 1993
- Genre: Platform
- Mode: Single-player

Felix the Cat is a platform video game by Hudson Soft, based on the cartoon character of the same name. It was released for the Nintendo Entertainment System (NES) in 1992, and for the Game Boy in 1993. Although Felix the Cat was developed in Japan, it was only released in North America and Europe.

A compilation of both versions was developed by Limited Run Games and published by Konami for the Nintendo Switch, PlayStation 5, and PlayStation 4, on March 28, 2024.

== Gameplay ==
NES version screenshot

The player controls Felix the Cat as he sets out to defeat the evil mad Professor, who has kidnapped Felix's girlfriend Kitty. The Game Boy version plays the same as the NES version, aside from featuring fewer levels and being in monochrome.

Felix the Cat has simple game mechanics. The A button is used to jump (press repeatedly to fly or swim), and the B button is used to attack. The type of attack varies depending on the magic level. When Felix falls into the bottomless pit (past the bottom of the level), runs out of time, or loses all his health, he loses a life. Scattered items replenish health and magic. Enemies include moles, tree trunks, cannons, birds, fish, and eight boss monsters. Enemies generally follow a regular pace back and forth, and Felix can shoot them. If Felix takes a hit, his magic power goes down one level. If Felix is at the lowest magic power and gets hit, he loses a life. There are nine worlds.

== Release ==
Felix the Cat was released in North America and Europe. A Famicom version was planned for Japan but never released. Game Champ reported a planned Japanese release for December 1992.

On March 28, 2024, Konami released a compilation of the NES and Game Boy versions of the game for Nintendo Switch, PlayStation 5, and PlayStation 4. A Windows version was also rated by the ESRB but never released. The compilation emulates the games through Limited Run Games' Carbon Engine, and features the ability to save and rewind gameplay at any time.

== Reception ==
Reception

Review scores
Publication	Score
AllGame	3.5/5
Consoles +	87%
Electronic Gaming Monthly	7/10; 8/10; 7/10; 7/10
Game Informer	7.5/10; 6.5/10; 8.25/10
GamePro	5/5; 4.5/5; 4.5/5; 5/5
Player One	79%
Banzzaï	88%

GamePro gave the NES version 5 out of 5. Allgame editor Skyler Miller described the game as "an example of the right way to produce a game using a popular license".
