= Fortified Zone =

1991 video game

- North American box art
- Developer: Jaleco
- Publisher: Jaleco
- Platform: Game Boy
- Release: JP: February 26, 1991; US: September 1991
- Genres: Shooter, action
- Modes: Single-player, multiplayer

Fortified Zone (Note: Japanese: 怒りの要塞, Hepburn: Ikari no Yōsai; lit. 'Fortress of Fury') is a 1991 top-down shooter video game developed and published by Jaleco for the Game Boy. The game is about the mercenaries Masato and Mizuki as they go through several environments to penetrate a military fortress. The game is set in a top-down point of view, where the characters shoot at various enemies while traverse four maze-like levels. The player can swap between each character who each have their own abilities ranging from being able to pick up enemy weapons to being able to jump to avoid traps.

It was first released in Japan on February 26, 1991, and later released in the United States in September 1991. A number of contemporary reviews were lukewarm, with some complimenting the game adding puzzle-solving and to its action-themed gameplay, while others found the game had too many frustrating elements and difficulty spikes. Some retrospective reviews of the game's digital re-releases had similar complaints as well as finding the game to be too short.

The game received two follow-ups with Fortified Zone 2 (1992) for the Game Boy and Operation Logic Bomb (1993) for the Super Nintendo Entertainment System.

== Plot and gameplay ==
Gameplay in Fortified Zone. Mizuki is seen from a top-down view with her health and weapon power information at the bottom of the screen.

Fortified Zone is about two soldiers who are on a mission to infiltrate an enemy fortress. They must travel through various areas to lead to a their final goal of the fortress. The game has four levels: a field, a jungle, a cave and a military complex. The view is in a top-down format with the game scrolling one room at a time. While exploring the levels, the player comes across various enemy soldiers, artillery and mutated creatures. If the player comes into contact or struck by their weapon fire, their health will decrease.

The game lets you switch between two characters during gameplay, Masato Kanzaki and Mizuki Makimura. Masato has the ability to pick up dropped weapons from enemies. Mizuki cannot equip these weapons, but can jump allowing her to navigate rooms that traps in the floor. Each character has their own health bar. Various weapons can be found that change gameplay, such as weapons that give Masato longer range in his shots or allow for rapid-fire shots. Power-ups can be found that can be used by either character, which enhance the fire-power of the character's weapons. If either character's health goes below zero, the player loses the use of that character for the rest of their game. If the remaining soldier loses all of their health, the game ends. At this moment, the player can either retry the game from the level they ended at or restart from the beginning.

Fortified Zone includes puzzle-solving elements to its gameplay. In some rooms in Fortified Zone, the exit is not available until the player defeats all the enemies in a room, others require keys that can be found within the level. Each level has its own boss and mini-boss to battle. On defeating the final boss at the end of stage 4, the player wins the game.

The game features an auto-mapping system that can be displayed to show the player's location as they traverse through the level. In a two-player mode, the players are free to move their character independently from each other through the levels. They can exchange weapons with each other at any time.

== Development and release ==
Fortified Zone was developed and published by the Japanese company Jaleco. The company was described by Game Developer as a "a relatively minor player" in the video game industry, and were predominantly known to American gamers for their series like Bases Loaded and Rod Land.

Fortified Zone was released for the Game Boy in Japan on February 26, 1991, and in the United States in September 1991. Fortified Zone was re-released digitally through the Virtual Console on the Nintendo 3DS on July 7, 2011, and added to the Nintendo Classics service on July 8, 2026.

Fortified Zone was followed by a sequel for the Game Boy, Fortified Zone 2 (Note: 怒りの要塞2, ikari no Yōsai 2; lit. 'Fortress of Fury 2') (1992), which was only released outside of Japan in 2025. A third game in the series was released to Western audiences for the Super Nintendo Entertainment System as Operation Logic Bomb (1993). While Fortified Zone 2 was a direct sequel to the original game, Marcel Van Duyn of NintendoLife described Operation Logic Bomb as a "somewhat unrelated" game.

== Reception ==
Contemporary reviews

Review scores
Publication	Score
Electronic Gaming Monthly	8/10, 8/10, 7/10, 8/10
Famitsu	6/10, 6/10, 7/10, 4/10
Game Zone	84/100
GB Action	65%
HobbyConsolas	83%
Hippon Super!	7/10
Player One	59%
Total!	68%
Video Games	67%

From contemporary reviews, general comments on the game ranged from reviewers in Famitsu finding it to be a simple, but solid game, Electronic Gaming Monthly (EGM) finding it "really average" to a Total! reviewer saying it was a great idea for a game that "doesn't take long before the faults become more apparent." Two reviewers in EGM suggested it may become a sleeper hit."

A review in Game Player's Encyclopedia of Game Boy Games found Fortified Zone's difficulty to be average, and potentially not posing much of a challenge for more hardcore fans. A reviewer in Famitsu noted the game had a difficulty spikes, with the Total! reviewer saying the fourth level had the difficulty level jump significantly.

Paul Lakin of Game Zone complimented Fortified Zone's challenging gameplay, large sprites and self-filling map as its highlights. A reviewer in Famitsu found the characters to be a bit plain, while a reviewer in Video Games said that like all mercenary-themed games, it was utterly ridiculous, but shined in terms of gameplay. A reviewer in Hippon Super! echoed this saying the game required a bit of thought instead of just pure shooting action. Nikito Nipongo of HobbyConsolas complimented the game for adding more strategy to the gameplay for the shooter game genre which he wrote had recently fallen on hard times. A Famitsu reviewer also found it better than the average action game as there was more to do in it. While one reviewer in the magazine complimented the thrill of what would be on the next screen, three of the reviewers said the player would often be automatically hit by enemies or projectiles on moving between said screens. While EGM said that no level is too large or too small, a reviewer in GamePro wished there were more levels. A reviewer in Player One found it had poor graphics and while being rather fun to play, it ultimately was not of any extraordinary interest.

=== Retrospective ===
Retrospective reviews

Review scores
Publication	Score
GamesRadar+	3.5/5
IGN	6.5/10
Nintendo Life	7/10
Official Nintendo Magazine	68%
Super Gamer	70%

From retrospective reviews, Jeremy Parish complimented the game for being a challenging shooter that was superior to similar games like Commando (1985) or Ikari Warriors (1986) as the non-linear missions made had more depth and satisfying action gameplay. Lucas M. Thomas of IGN said that while the ability to swap between characters added some flavor to the game, it was lacking in difficulty, and was too short and had stiff controls. Super Gamer echoed this saying while it was an original shooter game, it was a bit too short to hold anybody's attention too long.

Chris Scullion of Official Nintendo Magazine said it was a fun little action game, but not perfect. The respawning enemies can be a pain and it is frustrating to have to return through an entire area if you are beaten by a boss. Nathan Meunier of GamesRadar+ found Fortified Zone to be pretty fun, complimenting its boss encounters and it's "twists on the explore-and-shoot gameplay". The reviewer ultimately found it too easy and short with similar-looking maze levels. Nintendo Power said that the game's methodical pace and emphasis on exploration make the game "a watered down Metal Gear (1987)."

== See also ==
- List of Game Boy games
