= The True History of Puss 'N Boots =

- French theatrical release poster
- Directed by: Jérôme Deschamps; Pascal Hérold; Macha Makeïeff
- Screenplay by: Jérôme Deschamps; Pascal Hérold; Macha Makeïeff
- Based on: Puss in Boots by Charles Perrault
- Produced by: Pascal Hérold
- Starring: Jérôme Deschamps
- Edited by: Laurent Pelé
- Music by: Moriarty
- Production companies: France 3 Cinéma; Umedia; uFilm; Nexus Factory; Nadeo; Saga-Productions; MK2 Productions
- Distributed by: MK2 Diffusion (France)
- Release dates: 1 April 2009 (France & Belgium); 14 May 2011 (United States)
- Running time: 81 minutes
- Countries: France; Belgium; Switzerland
- Languages: French; English

The True History of Puss 'N Boots (French: La Véritable Histoire du chat botté) is a 2009 animated film directed by Jérôme Deschamps, Pascal Herold and Macha Makeïeff. It is based on Charles Perrault's story "Puss in Boots" about a cat who talks and walks on his hind legs while wearing magical boots.

== Technology ==
The True History of Puss 'N Boots was animated in RenderBox, the in-house rendering engine by Nadeo based on their own engine GameBbox which powers the TrackMania series and most Virtual Skipper games.

== Voice cast ==
- Jérôme Deschamps as Le Chat Botté (Puss 'N Boots) / La Meunier (The Miller) / La Paysan (The Peasant)
- Arthur Deschamps as P'tit Pierre (Peter)
- Louise Wallon as La Princesse (The Princess)
- Yolande Moreau as La Reine (The Queen)
- Atmen Kelif as Marcel / Le Cuisinier (The Cook)
- Jean-Claude Bolle-Reddat as Le Chambellan (The Chamberlain)
- François Toumarkine as Le Bossu (The Hunchback)
- Pascal Ternisien as Gaston
- Hervé Lassïnce as Maurice / Gardes Ogre (Guard Ogre) / Le Bûcheron (The Woodcutter) / Serveurs (Waiter)
- Philippe Leygnac as Le Fou (The Jester)
- Pascal Hérold as Charles Perrault
- André Wilms as L'Ogre (The Ogre)
- Robert Horn as L'Intendant
- Macha Makeïeff as La Serveuse (The Waitress) / La Toucan

=== English-language version ===
- Richard M. Dumont (Canada/UK), William Shatner (US) as Puss 'N Boots
- Daniel Brochu as Peter
- Holly Gauthier-Frankel as The Princess
- Pauline Little as The Queen
- Mark Camacho as Doc Marcel
- Arthur Holden as The Chamberlain
- Michael Perron as The Hunchback
- Terrence Scammel as Gaston
- Thor Bishopric as Maurice
- Hubert Feilden as The Miller
- Rick Jones as The Jester
- Bruce Dinsmore as The Butler
- Marcel Jeannin as Charles Perrault
- Alain Goulem as The Ogre

== See also ==
- Adaptations of Puss in Boots
