= Popeye (1990 video game) =

- Developer: Sigma Enterprises
- Publisher: Sigma Enterprises
- Platform: Game Boy
- Release: JP: April 20, 1990
- Genres: Action; Maze
- Modes: Single-player; Multiplayer

Popeye (ポパイ, Popai) is a Japan-exclusive Game Boy video game based on the comic strip of same name licensed from King Features Syndicate.

A cancelled US version was found in the 2020 Nintendo data leak, intended to be published by INTV Corporation.

== Gameplay ==
Screenshot showing the title screen and gameplay

The scenario is a maze and the player controls Popeye who has a time limit to collect some hearts, find Olive Oyl and save Swee'Pea which only appears somewhere to be saved after the hearts were collected and Olive found.

Popeye should avoid Bluto in order to prevent a fight with him, not losing time. When the fight is inevitable, and if Olive is already found, Popeye will lose her, and after the fight ends, he has to find her again. Bluto can drop weapons and enemies such as cannons and animals. He also steals the hearts and when it happens the heart will appear somewhere else to be collected. J. Wellington Wimpy is always wandering around and puts hamburgers that eventually block Popeye's path, however he can put so much as remove by eating them. A "flying" can of spinach will sometimes appear during the game anytime and out of nowhere, and can be used to increase Popeye's strength: be faster and the ability to eliminate enemies released by Bluto and Wimpy's hamburgers that obstruct the path. There are three playable courses and each one has five stages. In the game ending, Popeye marries Olive Oyl in front of a church.

Bluto is a playable character in the multiplayer-mode.

== See also ==
- Popeye 2
- List of games for the original Game Boy
