= Nagagutsu o Haita Neko: Sekai Isshū 80 Nichi Dai Bōken =

1986 video game

- Developer: Shouei System
- Publishers: JP: Toei Animation; NA: Electro Brain
- Platforms: Family Computer, Nintendo Entertainment System
- Release: JP: November 21, 1986; NA: June 1990
- Genre: 2D action platformer
- Modes: Single-player, multiplayer

Nagagutsu o Haita Neko: Sekai Isshū 80 Nichi Dai Bōken (長靴をはいた猫 世界一周80日大冒険; lit. "Puss in Boots: An Adventure Around the World in 80 Days") is a 1986 video game based on the third film of The Wonderful World of Puss 'n Boots that was released exclusively in Japan for the Family Computer. Four years later, the game (with several modifications) was released in North America for the Nintendo Entertainment System under the title Puss 'n Boots: Pero's Great Adventure.

Pero has to either avoid or eliminate these cat-like enemies who stand in his way.

The main character is the Puss in Boots character from the tale; a cat named Pero (Toei Animation's mascot) is also known as 'Perrault' in the game, as that was the name of the original author of the Puss in Boots story, Charles Perrault. He is known for helping an impoverished master attain wealth through the use of trickery.

== Gameplay ==
Loosely based on Jules Verne's classic novel Around the World in Eighty Days tied together with a classic anime, the player has 80 days in order to travel the world, which is shown through a time limit. One day passes in the game approximately every minute, although certain items can subtract the number of remaining days, providing the player with less time to complete the game. If these 80 days elapse before the player finishes the trip, the game is over no matter how many lives the player has remaining. Places that are explored include: England, the Atlantic Ocean, Arabia, Hong Kong, the Pacific Ocean, Alaska, the North Pole, and Big Ben. The game features "death water", a video game feature where video game characters instantly die after coming into contact with a watery substance.

This game also involves driving boats, cars, and balloons in addition to the standard walking through the stages.

The American version of the game Puss in Boots: Pero's Great Adventure but has slightly different stages. Arabia and the Pacific Ocean remain as they are and the England stage was changed to become the London stage, the other alternate stages are outer space, which is an error on the game's part, as it is actually a flying stage across some mountains, the American Old West, New York City and the final stage taking place at the Statue of Liberty.

== Development and release ==
Nagagutsu o Haita Neko was released in Japan for the Family Computer on November 21, 1986.

At the 1990 Winter Consumer Electronics Show (CES) in Las Vegas, Electro Brain, then a new licensee, showcased Fist of the North Star: 10 Big Brawls for the King of the Universe for the Game Boy along with Puss N Boots: Pero's Great Adventure. The game was released in English by Electro Brain in June 1990.

== Reception ==
In Computer Entertainer, a reviewer said the game should be appealing to younger gamers who its difficulty level is aimed at. Steve Harris of Electronic Gaming Monthly found that the controls in the game could have been better.

== See also ==
- Adaptations of Puss in Boots
