= Sports Collection =

1996 video game

- Cover art of Sports Collection
- Developer: Tose
- Publisher: Tonkin House
- Platform: Game Boy
- Release: JP: September 27, 1996
- Genres: Sports game Racing game
- Modes: Single-player; Multiplayer

Sports Collection (スポーツコレクション) is a 1996 Japan-exclusive sports video game released by Tonkin House for the Game Boy handheld.

== Summary ==
This title is a compilation of five sports games released between 1989 and 1991.

- 1989 - Seaside Volley (known in North America as Malibu Beach Volleyball)
- 1990 - Boxing (known in North America as Heavyweight Championship Boxing)
- 1990 - Roadster
- 1991 - Soccer (known in Europe as Football International)
- 1991 - Dodge Boy
