= Kingdom Crusade =

1991 video game

- North American cover art
- Developer: Sculptured Software
- Publishers: NA: Electro Brain; PAL: Ocean Software
- Designers: Adam T. Clayton; Steven P. Aguirre
- Composer: Paul Webb
- Platform: Game Boy
- Release: PAL: 1991; NA: November 1992
- Genre: Strategy
- Modes: Single-player; Double-player

Kingdom Crusade (known as The Legend of Prince Valiant in Europe) is a Game Boy strategy video game released in 1991 in the PAL regions and 1992 in North America. The PAL version was based on the cartoon of the same name.

== Summary ==
One of the units is patrolling the area around the white castle.

The game takes places during a hypothetical apocalyptic battle between a dark, evil army and a light, good army. Even the king and queen of each respective kingdom are expected to contribute to combat duty; which was expected of kings in the Middle Ages but not of most queens.

Even though this game is medieval in nature, it does not depict any cultures of Medieval Europe against each other. Players can take either side and both kingdom's units are of equal strength to each other. The units in the game correspond to Western high fantasy (i.e., paladins instead of samurai). All fighting is done in an arcade manner (real-time with button mashing) rather than a typical manner of a strategy or role-playing game (either turn-based or real-time without button mashing).

Each player must either destroy all of the opponent's units or capture all the castles in order to defeat the opponent and win the game. Winning results in a celebration screen while losing is the equivalent to a game over.

== Reception ==
Allgame gave this video game a score of 2.5 points out of a possible 5 in their overview. Power Unlimited gave the game a score of 62%, commending its concept, but considered that there is little action and strategy in the game.

== See also ==
- Archon: The Light and the Dark, which plays in a similar fashion to this video game
