= Trax (video game) =

1991 video game

- Developer: HAL Laboratory
- Publisher: HAL Laboratory: NA/EU: Electro Brain (rerelease)
- Composer: Hirohiko Takayama
- Platform: Game Boy
- Release: JP: January 8, 1991
- Genre: Shooter
- Modes: Single-player, multiplayer

Trax (Note: Known in Japan as Charge! Ponkotsu Tank (Japanese: 突撃！ポンコツタンク, Hepburn: Totsugeki! Ponkotsu Tanku)) is a 1991 shooter video game developed and published by HAL Laboratory for the Game Boy. Electro Brain published the game while being re-released outside Japan.

== Gameplay ==
Gameplay screenshot

Trax is a shooter game. The player controls a tank with a cannon that can be rotated to any one of the cardinal directions. Correspondingly, where traditional shooters consist of either horizontal or vertical levels, Trax mixes the two within the same level.

== Development and release ==
Trax was developed by HAL Laboratory. Hirohiko Takayama was the game's composer.

It was released for the Game Boy on January 8, 1991 in Japan.

== Reception ==
Reception

Review scores
Publication	Score
Aktueller Software Markt	8/12
Consoles +	84%
Famitsu	4/10, 7/10, 8/10, 4/10
Joypad	77%
Joystick	87%
Official Nintendo Magazine	59%
Player One	79%
Total!	32%
Video Games (DE)	66%
Play Time	81%
Super Gamer	37%

Trax garnered average reception from critics. Joystick's Jean-Marc Demoly said it was a dynamic game that deviates a bit from traditional shoot 'em ups, and highlighted its graphical presentation. Aktueller Software Markt's Sandra Alter found the game easy to control, but noted that it slowed down when too many enemies appeared on the screen. Play Time's Christian Müller commended the game's audiovisual department, precise controls, and good handling. Jacques Harbonn of Consoles + gave the game positive remarks for its humorous introductory sequence, its varied range of weapons, playability and multiplayer mode, but saw the drab visuals and unexceptional soundscape as weak points. Player One's Olivier Scamps celebrated the game's production value and multiplayer, but noted the occasional slowdowns and considered its low difficulty a major flaw.

Joypad's Olivier Prézeau found the game's four-player mode appealing, and commended its originality, humorous situations, sprite animations and visuals, but noticed the occasional slowdown. Video Games' Stephan Englhart opined that the game's enemies, landscapes, and weapons were not designed with much imagination. Englhart criticized the game's lack of variety and low difficulty, but highlighted its four-player mode. Nintendo Magazine System (Official Nintendo Magazine) rated Trax as a "Snooze-inducing driving-type game which lacks the pace and excitement to get the adrenalin flowing". Steve Jarratt of Total! commended the game's frenetic action, but lamented its short length. Super Gamer labelled it as a strange but repetitive multi-directional shooter.
