= Dead Heat Scramble =

1990 video game

- North American cover art
- Developer(s): Copya System
- Publisher(s): JP: Copya System; NA: Electro Brain
- Platform(s): Game Boy
- Release: JP: April 20, 1990; NA: December 1990
- Genre(s): Arcade racing
- Mode(s): Single-player; Multiplayer

Dead Heat Scramble (デッドヒート スクランブル) is a 1990 arcade racing game developed by Copya System and published by Electro Brain in North America and Copya System in Japan for the Game Boy.

== Summary ==
Players must choose between a dune buggy, a sand rail vehicle, and the incredible off-road truck. All races are strictly against the clock while the driver navigates through blockades on the road and other drivers that want to defeat the player. All of the ten courses must be unlocked in a linear fashion; all the races take place in a tube. Few power-ups exist in the game, including a chance to increase the player's nitro boost.

There are ten stages in the entire game. No penalties are given for bumping into the other drivers; unlike real life. Each course is in the shape of a half-pipe.
