= High Stakes Gambling =

1992 video game

- Developer(s): Sculptured Software
- Publisher(s): Electro Brain
- Designer(s): Perry Rodgers
- Platform(s): Game Boy
- Release: NA: June 1992
- Genre(s): Gambling
- Mode(s): Single-player, multiplayer

High Stakes Gambling is a Game Boy casino video game that takes place during the Great Depression in the 1930s. It was developed by Sculptured Software and published by Electro Brain in 1992.

== Summary ==
The player plays cards against an opponent

An FBI agent named Pete Rosetti, who is going undercover as an intrepid gambler, must turn the Mafia from filthy rich to dirt poor in a series of gambling games in order to arrest them.

In each of the game's five missions, the player competes against a different Mafia member of increasing difficulty in four rounds of casino games. The three preliminary rounds are blackjack, slot machines, and video poker; with the final confrontation being five-card draw poker. The player is provided with ten thousand dollars in his bank account at the start of each round. Each preliminary round awards the winner with a bonus of ten thousand dollars and five draw poker points to be used in the final round; the loser receives no money and two points.

The game's practice mode also includes craps, though it never appears in the game's missions.

For a price, players can buy a variety of special cheating tools in the hopes of making a profit off the gangsters, who often use cheating methods of their own. When running low on cash, the gangsters increase the frequency of their cheating in an attempt to regain their cash from the player.

== Reception ==
Nintendo Power magazine gave High Stakes Gambling a 3.4 out of 5 rating in its March 1992 issue. The independent video gaming magazine Allgame gave High Stakes Gambling an overall score of 3.5 stars out of 5.
