= Popeye 2 =

1991 video game

- Japanese cover art
- Developer: Copya System
- Publishers: JP: Sigma Enterprises; WW: Activision
- Designer: Akihiko Mori
- Composer: Akihiko Mori
- Platform: Game Boy
- Release: JP: November 22, 1991; NA: October 1993; EU: 1994
- Genre: Platform
- Mode: Single-player

Popeye 2 (ポパイ２, Popai Tsu) is a 1991 2D platform game based on Popeye comic strip created by E. C. Segar, developed by Copya System and published by Sigma Enterprises for the Game Boy handheld. It was later published in North America (1993) and Europe (1994) by Activision.

It is a sequel to Popeye, released exclusively in Japan in 1990.

== Reception ==
Reception

Aggregate score
Aggregator	Score
GameRankings	59.00%

Popeye 2 received average reviews with a score of 59% from Gamerankings, 2.95/5 from Nintendo Power and 4/5 from GamePro.
