= Electro Brain =

American video game company

Electro Brain Corp.
- Logo during the mid-1990s
- Type: Public
- Industry: Video games
- Founded: 1989; 37 years ago
- Founder: Ronald Johnson
- Defunct: 1999
- Headquarters: Salt Lake City, Utah, United States

Electro Brain was a North American video game publisher based in Salt Lake City, Utah that was active from 1989 to 1999.

== History ==
The company was originally founded in late 1989 by Ronald Johnson, initially to export NES and Game Boy titles for the North American market. The first games were announced at the 1990 Winter CES, those being the acquired Japanese games Puss 'n Boots: Pero's Great Adventure and Fist of the North Star: 10 Big Brawls for the King of the Universe. Both games were localized from Toei Animation.

The company followed it up with the first Western-developed title to be published by the company, Super Cars, by Gremlin Graphics. The company's success led Electro Brain to enter a distribution partnership with Absolute Entertainment for its video game titles, with the first title coming out of the deal was Battletank. The company also had clients with Sculptured Software, Imagineering, Loriciel and Gremlin Graphics.

The next few games saw success and/or misses such as Eliminator Boat Duel by Sculptured Software, Ghoul School by Imagineering, Stanley: The Search for Dr. Livingston by Sculptured Software and its first SNES title Raiden by Toei Animation. Raiden marked its biggest success to date with critical acclaim, becoming Electro Brain's best-selling video game ever. Following that, the company came Best of the Best: Championship Karate, designed by Loriciel, which was also a critical and commercial success.

In 1993, the company made a milestone when the company released two sports games designed by Sculptured Software, such as the Tony Meola-endorsed Tony Meola's Sidekicks Soccer and Boxing Legends of the Ring, endorsed by boxing players, such as Sugar Ray Leonard, Thomas Hearns and Marvelous Marvin Hagler, which were another of the company's winners. In early 1994, the company decided to endorse with Tommy Moe in a deal for the title Tommy Moe's Winter Extreme: Skiing & Snowboarding, designed by Loriciel, for the SNES. In 1994, the company released another technical hit, Vortex, by Argonaut Software which shows off the effects of the Super FX, and it was the most expensive game Electro Brain ever produced.

After the company stopped publishing games in 1994, as it was resorted to reissuing titles abandoned by their original publishers, such as Trax, which was originally released by HAL America, and Felix the Cat, which was originally released by Hudson Soft, the company once again briefly publishing three Hudson Soft games for the Nintendo 64 and Game Boy Color in 1998, such as Star Soldier: Vanishing Earth, Dual Heroes and Bomberman Quest, the former came to a flop and went bust in 1999.

== Games ==
=== NES ===
- Puss 'n Boots: Pero's Great Adventure (1990)
- Super Cars (1991)
- Eliminator Boat Duel (1991)
- Ghoul School (1992)
- Stanley: The Search for Dr. Livingston (1992)
- Best of the Best: Championship Karate (1992)

=== Super NES ===
- Raiden (1992)
- Boxing Legends of the Ring (1993)
- Best of the Best: Championship Karate (1993)
- Tony Meola's Sidekicks Soccer (1993)
- Jim Power: The Lost Dimension in 3-D (1993)
- Vortex (1994)
- Tommy Moe's Winter Extreme: Skiing & Snowboarding (1994)

=== Nintendo 64 ===
- Dual Heroes (1998)
- Star Soldier: Vanishing Earth (1998)

=== Game Boy ===
- Fist of the North Star: 10 Big Brawls for the King of the Universe (1990)
- Go! Go! Tank (1990)
- Dead Heat Scramble (1990)
- Metal Masters (1990)
- Trax (1991)
- Brainbender (1991)
- High Stakes Gambling (1992)
- Mouse Trap Hotel (1992)
- Bionic Battler (1992)
- Kingdom Crusade (1992)
- Best of the Best: Championship Karate (1992)
- Felix the Cat (1993)
- Bomberman Quest (1998)

=== Sega Genesis ===
- Best of the Best: Championship Karate (1993)
- Boxing Legends of the Ring (1993)
