= Amazing Tater =

1991 video game

- Developer: Atlus
- Publisher: Atlus
- Composer: Hidehito Aoki
- Platform: Game Boy
- Release: JP: August 2, 1991; US: February 1992
- Genre: Puzzle
- Mode: Single-player

Amazing Tater (Note: Japanese: パズルボーイII, Hepburn: Pazuru Bōi II; lit. 'Puzzle Boy II') is a video game for the Game Boy developed and published by Atlus.

Amazing Tater was released in Japan for the Game Boy on August 2, 1991 and is the sequel to Kwirk (1989) which was released as Pazuru Bōi. The English-language release of the game does not present any connection to the earlier game.

== Gameplay ==
Title screen

The player must guide a potato to the exit of each level, which consists of several obstacles. By pushing crates, the player fills up holes that can then be crossed. Different shaped crates and holes create puzzle like situations. The player must also manipulate rotation devices to reach the goal.

There are four different modes in the game. These include a practice mode, a "normal" puzzle mode, a mode specially designed for beginning players and an "action" mode containing two stories: Mega Picnic and Puzzle Forest.

== Production and release ==
Amazing Tater was developed and published by Atlus.

It was released in Japan for the Game Boy on August 2, 1991. In Japan, it was promoted as a sequel to Kwirk (1989) which was released as Pazuru Bōi while the English-language release of the game does not present any connection to the earlier game. It was released in the United States in February 1992.

== Reception ==
Reception

Review scores
Publication	Score
Famitsu	5/10, 6/10, 6/10, 5/10
Games-X	4/5
Go!	86/100
Play Time	73%
Power Play	82%

Contemporaneous reviews of Amazing Tater were generally positive. Most reviewers were complimentary of its charming presentation and moderate difficulty. Paul Rand writing for the magazine Go! said, "A-Mazing Tater has the same addictive qualities and, with a two-player option, a whole new challenge once you've completed the game on your own." Play Time called it "a hot tip for fans of brain teasers and puzzle games!" The quality of the graphics were generally criticized but German publication Power Play called out the music as a highlight.

== See also ==
- List of Game Boy games
