= Go! Go! Tank =

1990 video game

- Japanese cover art
- Developer: Copya System
- Publishers: JP: Copya System; NA: Electro Brain
- Platform: Game Boy
- Release: JP: November 30, 1990; NA: May 1991
- Genres: Action; Strategy
- Modes: single-player; multiplayer

Go! Go! Tank (ゴーゴー・タンク) is an action-oriented strategy video game released in 1990.

== Summary ==
This video game was developed for the Game Boy handheld game console. The game's narrative is as follows: A peaceful nation has been invaded by an enemy army. The tank will roll forward on its own and climb up any wall that is only a single block high—anything taller and it will crash into it and turn around, taking damage. An airplane must be controlled in order to gather the blocks needed to climb the walls. The map is essentially a race to the top of a hill. Puzzle-solving and shooting enemy tanks are a part of the gameplay.
