= Puss in Boots (play) =

1797 play by Ludwig Tieck

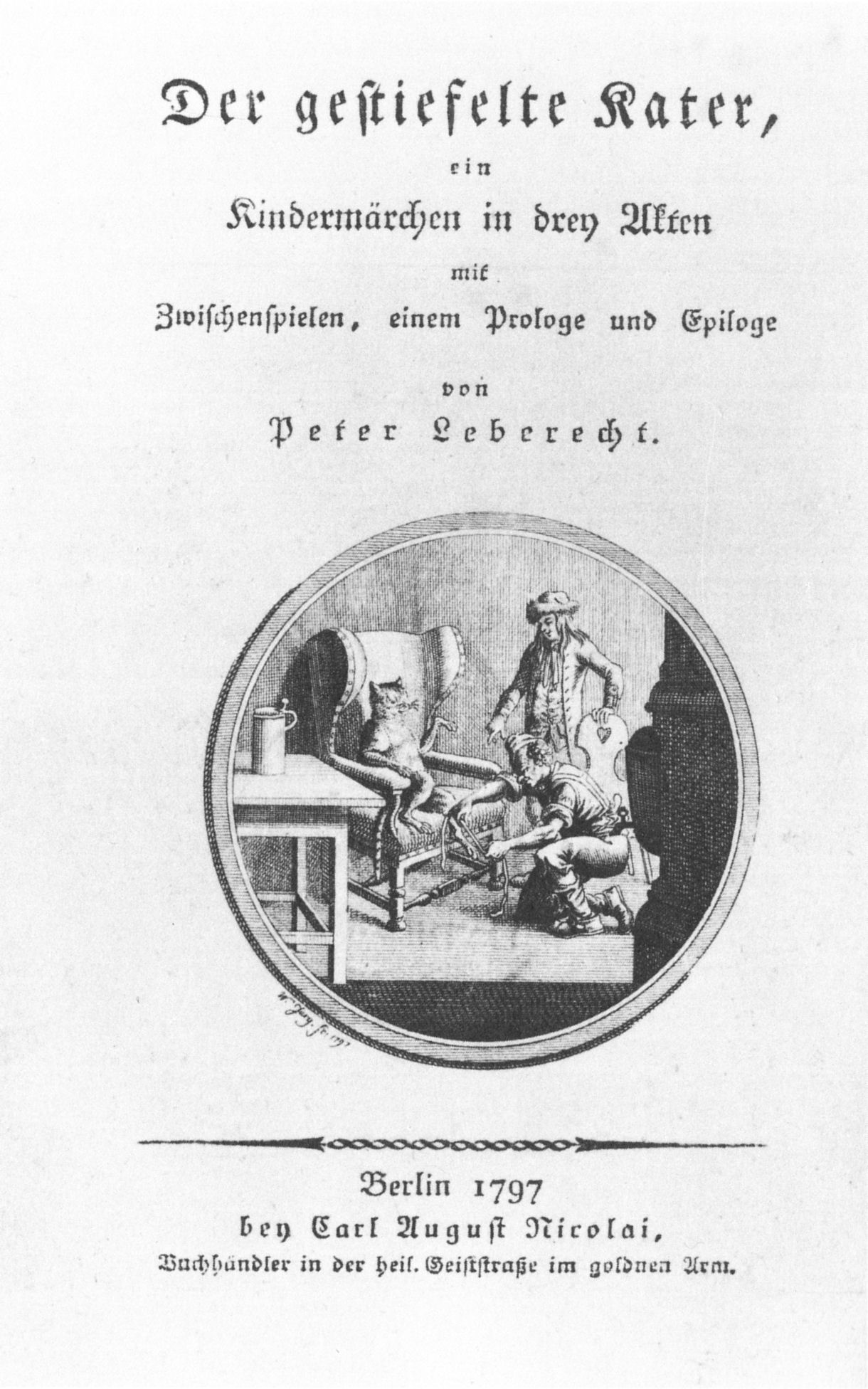
- Title page of the first edition
- Original title: Der gestiefelte Kater
- Written by: Ludwig Tieck
- Original language: German
- Genre: comedy

Premiere
- Date premiered: 20 April 1844
- Place premiered: Berlin

Puss in Boots (German: Der gestiefelte Kater) is a comedy play by the German writer Ludwig Tieck, written in verse and published in 1797. It is based on the fairy tale Puss in Boots and follows the poor farmer Gottlieb and his clever, talking cat as they set out to win a kingdom for themselves. The play has three acts and satirises human nature and the theatre audience of the day, containing interruptions from the audience, the author and technicians during its prologue and epilogue.

The play was first performed in Berlin on 20 April 1844. The original performance was very poorly received. The play was reevaluated and received a much more positive reception after it was staged by Jürgen Fehling in Berlin in 1924.

Tankred Dorst used Tieck's play as the basis for his 1964 play Der gestiefelte Kater oder Wie man das Spiel spielt. This play was in turn the basis for a 1975 opera with the same name, with a libretto by Dorst and music by Günter Bialas.
