= Spud's Adventure =

1991 video game

- North American box art
- Developer: Atlus Co.
- Publisher: Atlus
- Series: Puzzle Boy
- Platform: Game Boy
- Release: JP: January 25, 1991; NA: June 1991
- Genres: Role-playing video game, action
- Modes: Single-player, multiplayer

Spud's Adventure (突撃ばれいしょんず, Totsugeki Bareishons; "Totsugeki! Variations") is an adventure video game with role-playing video game elements published by Atlus in 1991. This game stars a cast of mostly vegetables; Spud, a cap-wearing potato, is the hero and must save Princess Mato from the evil clutches of Devi.

Spud's Adventure is one of the rarest Game Boy games.

== Gameplay ==
Controlling Spud, the player must ascend Far Tower. As Spud fights enemies with his projectile weapon, he gains experience points, and for every 100 points, he gains a level and additional health. As he rescues allies, they can be switched to when exploring the dungeon. Each character has their own unique abilities; Arnie Eggplant, for instance, wields a boomerang with longer range than Spud's weapon.

Each floor of the tower houses either a maze-like area, enemies, puzzles, cinema scenes, power-ups, characters with useful tips, or a combination. Keys can be found to open doors and stairs let Spud get to the next floor. Some floors have the controls reverse or feature holes to avoid, while others intermittently turn off the lights. Select floors feature a boss to fight, after which a password is created.

A Versus Mode is enabled with two copies of the game and a Game Boy Link Cable, which lets players choose a tower round to ascend and allows control of all four playable characters, the goal being the first player to rescue the princess.

== Story ==
Spud has to defeat these enemies in this action sequence of the game.

In the Vegetable Kingdom, King Vegitan the 5th (a tomato) decides it is time to find his daughter Princess Mato a husband. She feels embarrassed by this. This is when the castle is stormed by Devi, a demonic beetle that represents the Devil.

Princess Mato is kidnapped and taken to Devi's castle where he holds her prisoner. The King is terrified for his daughter's life and orders two knights, Arnie Eggplant and Gerrit Carrot to go rescue her. Both head off on their journey but they never return. This is when Spud, a lonely wanderer, offers to go to Devi's castle and attempt to find The King's daughter. The King is grateful for his help, and gives Spud his blessing.

During the adventure, Spud rescues both Arnie and Gerrit, who decide to help Spud by finishing the job they started. Spud also meets one of Arnie's friends on the first floor of the castle, Terry Turnip. When Arnie dies saving her from falling rocks, Terry replaces Arnie in helping Spud find the Princess later on throughout the game. A scene exclusive to the Japanese version of the game has Devi's sister persuade him to not attack Spud. In the end, Devi and Spud face off alone and Spud is victorious, only for Devi to reveal he was serving his master Dodorian. Dodorian kills Devi for providing Spud's party with help, but Spud defeats him as well. Spud rescues the Princess and returns her to The King. Spud then says it is time for him to go, and he leaves to continue wandering the world as Arnie and Devi's spirits smile upon the party.

Princess Mato calls after him, and decides she wants to go with him, and with this, the game is over.

== Release and reception ==
Reception

Review score
Publication	Score
Famitsu	3/10, 6/10, 6/10, 4/10

Spud's Adventure was released for the Game Boy in Japan on January 25, 1991.
