= Puss in Boots (1961 film) =

- Mexican theatrical release poster
- Directed by: Roberto Rodríguez; Manuel San Fernando
- Written by: Charles Perrault (story); Sergio Magaña (screen story)
- Produced by: Roberto Rodríguez
- Starring: Santanón; Humberto Dupeyrón
- Cinematography: Rosalío Solano
- Music by: Sergio Guerrero
- Production company: Películas Rodríguez S.A.
- Release date: 14 September 1961
- Running time: 90 minutes
- Country: Mexico
- Language: Spanish

El gato con botas (English: Puss in Boots) is a 1961 Mexican fantasy film. Based on Charles Perrault's Puss in Boots, it was scripted, produced and directed by Roberto Rodriguez and Manuel San Fernando and starred Santanon in the title role. The film was made by Peliculas Rodriguez, S.A. at the Estudios Churubusco film studios and was shot in Eastmancolor.

== Plot ==
A king is forced to give his daughter to an ogre, but a fairy gives a peasant boy a pair of boots. The boy puts them on his cat, which becomes human-sized and leads the boy to fight the ogre.

== Cast ==
- Santanon as Puss
- Amando Gutierrez as The Ogre
- Rafael Munoz
- Humberto Dupeyron
- Rocio Rosales
- Antonio Raxel
- Luis Manuel Pelayo

== Production ==
For his role as Puss, the star Santanon was covered entirely by a furred cat costume, which in turn was adorned with feathered hat, vest and pants, and a sword.

== Distribution ==
In 1964, entrepreneur K. Gordon Murray acquired American rights to the film, edited it to 70 minutes, dubbed it, and released it nationwide as one in a series of fantasy films intended to be exhibited strictly as matinee films for children. Murray's advertising for these films came with strict instructions as to showtimes, additional programming, advertising displays, and other matters normally left to the discretion of theater managers.
