= Tsukasa Tawada =

- 多和田吏
- Born: March 24, 1965 (age 61); Japan
- Occupations: Composer; sound designer
- Years active: 1987–present
- Musical career
- Genres: Jazz; rock; classical
- Instrument: Piano

Tsukasa Tawada (多和田吏, Tawada Tsukasa; born March 24, 1965) is a Japanese video game composer and sound effects designer best known for scoring several Pokémon games.

== Biography ==
In 2003, Tawada composed the music to Pokémon Colosseum, a video game made by the development studio Genius Sonority. He has since scored the subsequent Pokémon titles developed by the company: the sequel to Pokémon Colosseum, Pokémon XD: Gale of Darkness (2005), the puzzle video game, Pokémon Trozei! (Pokémon Link! in Europe), and Pokémon Battle Revolution (2006).

== Works ==
All works listed below were composed by Tawada unless otherwise noted.

=== Video games ===
Year	Title	Notes
1986	Druid	Famicom version
1986	Dogfight Spirit	
1987	Maniac Mansion	Famicom version
1989	Plus Alpha	
1990	Rod Land	
1990	Cadillac	
1990	JaJaMaru Gekimaden: Maboroshi no Kinmajou	
1991	Dungeon Master (SNES version)	with Hikoshi Hashimoto
1991	Earth Defense Force	
1991	Fortified Zone	
1991	Whomp 'Em	
1992	Moon Crystal	
1993	Ihatovo Monogatari	
1993	Thoroughbred Breeder	
1993	Keio Flying Squadron	
1994	Dungeon Master II	with Hikoshi Hashimoto
1994	Thoroughbred Breeder II	
1995	Dragon Quest VI	sound design
1996	Keio Flying Squadron 2	
1996	Thoroughbred Breeder III	
1996	Dragon Quest III (SFC version)	sound design
1997	Universal Nuts	
1998	Dungeon Master Nexus	with Hikoshi Hashimoto
1998	Rami-chan no Ōedo Sugoroku: Keiō Yūgekitai Gaiden	
1998	ZigZag Ball	
2000	Dragon Quest VII	sound design
2001	Dragon Quest IV (PS1 version)	sound design
2003	Pokemon Colosseum	
2005	Pokémon XD: Gale of Darkness	
2005	Pokémon Trozei!	
2006	Pokémon Battle Revolution	
2009	Wacky World of Sports	
2014	Pokémon Battle Trozei	
2014	Harvest Moon: The Lost Valley	
2015	Pokémon Shuffle	
2016	Harvest Moon: Skytree Village	
2017	Harvest Moon: Light of Hope	
2019	Harvest Moon: Mad Dash	
2020	Pokémon Café Mix	
2021	Harvest Moon: One World	
2023	Harvest Moon: The Winds of Anthos	

=== Other works ===
- Ten Plants (1998) – with many others
