= Keio (disambiguation) =

Keio may refer to:

- Keiō (慶応), a Japanese era name
- Keio University (慶應義塾大学), a Tokyo university
- Keio Corporation (京王電鉄), a Tokyo-based transportation company
  - See under 'Keio...' in Category:Electric multiple units of Japan
- Keio Flying Squadron series or Keio Yūgekitai, the name of a video game series released on the Sega Mega CD\Sega CD, Sega Saturn, and Sony PlayStation consoles
