= Square Deal: The Game of Two Dimensional Poker =

1990 video game

Square Deal Cadillac II
- North American cover art (Game Boy)
- Developer: Hect
- Publishers: Hect (Japan); DTMC (North America)
- Composer: Tsukasa Tawada
- Platforms: Game Boy; Family Computer
- Release: Game Boy: JP: November 30, 1990; NA: 1991
- Genre: Strategy
- Modes: Single-player; Multiplayer

Square Deal: The Game of Two Dimensional Poker (known in Japan as Cadillac II (キャデラックII, Kyaderakku II)) is a video game developed by Hect for the Game Boy. The Japanese version serves as the sequel to the Family Computer game Cadillac. In 1999, Cadillac was also released for the PlayStation.

== Gameplay ==
A straight flush is made for some extra points.

The game uses cards to create hands based on poker. A full deck of 52 playing cards are shuffled and the top four cards are shown to the player. Each card drops down one at a time to a grid of 25 potential playing spaces. A winning poker hand must be made in order to eliminate the cards (i.e., royal flush, straight flush, full house). Players can only place cards horizontally or vertically; never diagonally. Players advance to the next level when all 52 cards have been removed. Each level gives players less time to think about their moves and the ability to have decision-making pauses.

Players start with $1000 in gambling money. However, an increasing number is required for the ante at the beginning of each new level. Antes start at $500 (in the early stages) and work their way up to $3000 (in the later stages). If he cannot make the ante, then it results in an automatic game over. Failing to eliminate all 52 cards results will result in a penalty being deducted from the player's earnings for each card left over. If the player is forced to use the "hidden" sixth row anytime during single-player play, it results in a game over. The sixth row is permitted during the two-player challenge. However, it makes the bottom row disappear.

After winning level 10 on single-player mode; the player will have beaten the entire game.
