= Jōji Yanami =

Japanese actor and narrator (1931–2021)

- 八奈見 乗児
- Born: Shigemitsu Shirato (白土 繁満); August 30, 1931; Tokyo City, Japan
- Died: December 3, 2021 (aged 90)
- Occupations: Actor; voice actor; narrator
- Years active: 1963–2015
- Agent: Aoni Production
- Website: Official profile

Jōji Yanami (八奈見 乗児, Yanami Jōji; born Shigemitsu Shirato (白土 繁満, Shirato Shigemitsu), August 30, 1931 – December 3, 2021) was a Japanese actor, voice actor and narrator who was affiliated with Aoni Production. Some of his most prominent voice roles included the narrator, Dr. Briefs, Kaiō-sama (a.k.a. King Kai or North Kaio), and Bobbidi in the Dragon Ball anime series. Other major roles included Dr. Isaac Gilmore in Cyborg 009, Gennai in Digimon, Ittan Momen in GeGeGe no Kitarō, Dr. Yumi in Mazinger Z, and numerous characters in the Time Bokan series.

On September 25, 2015, Toei Animation announced that Yanami would be taking medical leave from working on the Dragon Ball Super television anime series for an indefinite amount of time, with his roles as the narrator and Kaiō-sama being taken over by Naoki Tatsuta.

== Death ==
Yanami died of natural causes on December 3, 2021, at the age of 90.

== Filmography ==
=== Animation ===
List of voice performances in animation
Year	Title	Role	Notes	Source
1963	Wolf Boy Ken	Boss		
1966	Osomatsu-kun	Father	1st TV series	
1968	Kyojin no Hoshi	Ban Chuuta		
1968	Cyborg 009	Dr. Isaac Gilmore		
1969	Mōretsu Atarō	Kokoro Boss		
1969	Moomin	Muskrat	Also 1972 series	
1970	Ashita no Joe	Tonkichi		
1972	Devilman	Principal Pochi		
1972	Mazinger Z	Prof. Yumi		
1973	Wansa-kun	Lupine ルパン		
1973	Cutie Honey	Dr. Kisaragi 如月博士		
1974	Great Mazinger	Prof. Gennosuke Yumi,		
1974	Calimero	Dr. Owl / Mouse Gang · Pepe フクロウ先生 / ネズミギャング・ペペ		
1975	Getter Robo G	Benkei Kuruma, Emperor Burai		
1975	Time Bokan	Grocky		
1975	UFO Robo Grendizer	Dr. Umon, Emperor Vega		
1977	Yatterman	Boyacky		
1977	Jetter Mars	Secretary Tawashi		
1977	Lupin the 3rd Part II	Guinness, Danchonee ギネス / ダンチョネ	2nd series	
1978	Space Pirate Captain Harlock	Dr. Zero, Prime Minister		
1978	Galaxy Express 999	Black knight, bobambo, Stanley		
1979	Zenderman	Topokke		
1980	Time Patrol-Tai Otasukeman	Sekobitchi		
1980	Magical Girl Lalabel	Tachibana architecture 立花作造		
1980	Botchan	Red shirt 赤シャツ		
1980	Astro Boy	Dr. Bali Bali バリバリ博士		
1980	Space Battleship Yamato III	Old man of a pilgrim spaceship 巡礼宇宙船の老人		
1981	Yattodetaman	Julie Kokematsu		
1981	Braiger	Pancho Poncho		
1981	Urusei Yatsura	Swimming Pool Yōkai / Rude Speech / Rabbit プール妖怪 / 言語道断 / ウサギ		
1982	Gyakuten Ippatsu-man	Kosuinen		
1982	Space Cobra	Jingoli ジンゴロウ		
1983	Kinnikuman	Elder Ingen		
1983	Itadakiman	Dasinen		
1983	Magical Angel Creamy Mami	Bali Bali / Zenkyusori Goro バリバリ / 銭亀為五郎		
1984	Lupin the 3rd Part III	General Reptor / Professor Yang レプトル将軍 / 楊教授		
1984	Farewell Farewell	Odanna オオダンナ		
1985	Magical Emi	Yousuke Nakamori		
1985	Akumatō no Purinsu: Mitsume ga Tōru	Hige Oyaji ヒゲおやじ		
1985	GeGeGe no Kitarō	Sorry 一反もめん	3rd TV series	
1986	Maple Town Story	Mayor of Clark Ryan クラーク・ライアン町長		
1986	Dragon Ball	Narrator, Dr. Briefs, King, Dr. Frappe, Mousse		
1986	Anmitsu Hime	Akakawa Hiroshi gate あべかわ彦左ェ門		
1987	Norakuro-kun	Norayama Kurokichi		
1987	Bikkuriman	Super Zeus		
1988	City Hunter 2	Takeda 武田		
1989	Dragon Ball Z	Narrator, Kaiō-sama (King Kai, North), Dr. Briefs, King, Bobbidi		
1989	Chimpui	Wandau ワンダユウ		
1990	Mōretsu Atarō	Kokoro Boss		
1992	Cooking Papa	Yoshioka 吉岡		
1992	Bastard!!	King of Metallicana	OVA	
1993	The Irresponsible Captain Tylor	Kitaguchi キタグチ		
1996	GeGeGe no Kitaro	Well Sennin 井戸仙人	4th TV series	
1996	Dragon Ball GT	Narration ナレーション		
1999	Digimon Adventure	Gennai ゲンナイ		
1999	Beast Wars	Seaclamp		
1999	One Piece	Boodle, Ganfall (Sky Knight) ブードル, ガンフォール（空の騎士）	TV; Former God of Skypiea	
2000	Inuyasha	Totousai / Kensuke Sakai 刀々斎		
2003	Rumic Theater	Uncle		
2005–2006	Tsubasa Chronicle series	Old shopowner, Old man		
2006	D.Gray-man	Crowley's grandfather クロウリーの祖父		
2007	GeGeGe no Kitaro	Sorry 一反もめん	5th TV series	
2008	Yatterman	Boyacci / Les Onarabu Davenki ボヤッキー / レ・オナラブー・ダベンキ		
2008	Kannagi: Crazy Shrine Maidens	Dr. Poison Scorpio 毒蠍先生		
2009–2010	Dragon Ball Kai	Narrator, North Kaio	Also Majin Boo arc in 2014	
2009	Inuyasha	Kensuke Sakai 刀々斎		
2010	Digimon Cross Wars	Caletemon カレテモン		
2012	Ixion Saga DT	A doctor 医師	TV; Yamami infant nominee	
2015	Dragon Ball Super	Narrator, North Kaiō	Episodes 1-12	

=== Theatrical animation ===
List of voice performances in theatrical animation
Year	Title	Role	Notes	Source
1966	Cyborg 009	Dr. Isaac Gilmore		
1967	Cyborg 009: Monster Wars	Dr. Isaac Gilmore		
1971	Animal Treasure Island	Baron		
1973	Panda's Adventures ja:パンダの大冒険	Elder 長老		
1973	Mazinger Z vs. Devilman	Professor Gennosuke Yumi, Pochi		
1974	Yaemon, the Locomotive ja:きかんしゃやえもん D51の大冒険	jumbo ジャンボ		
1975	Great Mazinger vs. Getter Robo G: Kuchu Daigekitotsu	Benkei Kuruma		
1976	Puss 'N Boots Travels Around the World	Mayor 市長		
1976	Grendizer, Getter Robo G, Great Mazinger: Kessen! Daikaijuu	Dr. Umon, Dr. Yumi		
1977	Planet Robo Dangard A vs Insect Robot Corps ja:惑星ロボ ダンガードA対昆虫ロボット軍団	Insect human being 昆虫人間		
1980	Toward the Terra	Doctor		
1980	Cyborg 009: Legend of the Super Vortex	Dr. Cosmo		
1981	The Fantastic Adventures of Unico	God 神様		
1981	Devil and Princess Mimi ja:悪魔と姫ぎみ	King 王様		
1981	The Sea Prince and the Fire Child	Sandpit 砂っぺ		
1981	Tao Tao: The Story of Panda ja:シュンマオ物語 タオタオ	Prime minister 総理大臣		
1982	Haguregumo	Shibusawa sensei 渋沢先生		
1983	Dr. Slump and Arale-chan: Hoyoyo, Great Round-the-World Race	Volvo ボロボ		
1984	Boy Kenya ja:少年ケニヤ	Dr. Stein シュタイン博士		
1984	Dr. Slump and Arale-chan: Hoyoyo! The Treasure of Nanaba Castle	Demon		
1984	Great Riot! Seigi Choujin	Horumon Yaki		
1986	Fist of the North Star	Gulf ガルフ		
1986	Super Mario Bros.: The Great Mission to Rescue Princess Peach!	Priest		
1986	Ai City	Tei テイ		
1986	Dragon Ball: Curse of the Blood Rubies	Narrator		
1987	Grimm fairy tales: The Golden Bird ja:グリム童話 金の鳥	Large 大とり		
1987	Dragon Ball: Sleeping Princess in Devil's Castle	Narrator		
1988	Dragon Ball: Mystical Adventure	Narrator		
1990	Dragon Ball Z: The World's Strongest	Narrator		
1990	Chinpui: Eri-sama Katsudō Daishashin	Wandau ワンダユウ		
1990	Dragon Ball Z: The Tree of Might	North Kaio, Narrator		
1991	Dragon Ball Z: Lord Slug	Narrator, Kaio		
1991	Dragon Ball Z: Cooler's Revenge	Narrator		
1992	Dragon Ball Z: The Return of Cooler	Narrator		
1992	Dragon Ball Z: Super Android 13	Narrator		
1993	Dragon Ball Z: Broly – The Legendary Super Saiyan	Narrator, Kaio, Dr. Briefs		
1993	Dragon Ball Z: Bojack Unbound	Narrator, Kaio, Gyo san money ナレーション / 界王 / ギョーサン・マネー		
1994	Dragon Ball Z: Broly – Second Coming	Narrator		
1994	Fatal Fury: The Motion Picture	Yamada Jubei 山田十兵衛		
1995	Dragon Ball Z: Fusion Reborn	Narrator, North Kaio		
1995	Farewell to Nostradamus	Philip フィリップ		
1996	Dragon Ball: The Path to Power	Narrator		
1996	Crayon Shin-chan: Adventure in Henderland	Playing cards		
1997	Elmer's Adventure: My Father's Dragon	Cat		
1998	Catnapped!	Hui Hui ホイホイ		
2001	Doraemon: Nobita and the Winged Braves	Prince Ohtakatta オオタカ総理		
2003	Inuyasha the Movie: Swords of an Honorable Ruler	Totosai		
2005	One Piece the Movie: Baron Omatsuri and the Secret Island	Kerodark ケロデーク		
2008	Dragon Ball: Yo! Son Goku and His Friends Return!!	Narrator, North Kai	Short film	
2009	Yatterman: Shin Yatter Mecha Daishūgō! Omocha no Kuni de Daikessen da Koron!	Boyacky		
2011	Dragon Ball: Episode of Bardock	Narrator		
2013	Dragon Ball Z: Battle of Gods	Narration, Kaio, Dr. Briefs		
2013	Lupin the 3rd vs. Detective Conan: The Movie	Master		
2015	Dragon Ball Z: Resurrection 'F'	Narrator		

=== Japanese dubbing ===
Live-action

Year	Title	Role	Dub for	Notes	Source
1992	Masters of the Universe	Gwildor	Billy Barty		
1992	Shining Through	Konrad Friedrichs	John Gielgud		
2010	Where the Wild Things Are	Bernard the Bull	Michael Berry Jr.		

Animation

Year	Title	Role	Notes	Source
1979	Alice in Wonderland	Doorknob		
1981	Fun and Fancy Free	Goofy		
2004	The Incredibles	Passerby		
2006	Cars	Fillmore		
2011	Cars 2	Fillmore		

=== Drama CD ===
List of voice performances in Drama CD
Year	Title	Role	Notes	Source
1993–94	Dragon Quest IV	Bly ブライ		
1995	Don't Leave Me Alone, Daisy	Yoichiro Uino 歩野陽一郎		
	Bastard!!	King of Mettalicana		

=== Video games ===
List of voice performances in video games
Year	Title	Role	Notes	Source
1984	Nausicaa of the Valley of the Wind	Disappointed ギックリ	Other	
1993	Keiō Yūgekitai	Dr. Pon Eho	SCD	
1993	Cyborg 009	Dr. Isaac Gilmore	Mega Drive	
1994–2011	Dragon Ball video games	Narrator, Kaio-sama, Bobbidi, others		
1996	Keiō Yūgekitai: Katsugeki-hen	Dr. Pon Eho, Grandpa	SS	
1996	Tobal No. 1	Fei Pu Su フェイ・プウ・スー	PS1 / PS2	
1996–1998	Time Bokan series	Boyacky		
1997	Tobal 2	Fei Pu Su フェイ・プウ・スー	PS1 / PS2	
1998	Sakura Taisen 2: Kimi, Shinitamō Koto Nakare	Woodcutter 木喰	SS	
1998	Rami-chan no Ōedo Sugoroku: Keiō Yūgekitai Gaiden	Dr. Pon Eho	PS1	
1999	Captain Love	Yoshimori Nagahori 永堀義光	PS1 / PS2	
2000	Salaryman Kintaro the Game	Yoshiyoshi Mita 三田善吉	PS1 / PS2	
2001	Bokan GoGoGo	Grocky, Boyacky, Tobokkee, Sekovitch, Julie Kokematsu, Kosuinen, Dasainen, Hierre	PS1 / PS2	
2001	Matsumoto Zero 999 - Story of Galaxy Express 999 -	Dr. Zero; Dr.ゼロ	PS1 / PS2; Yamami infant nominee	
2001	Inuyasha	Tōtōsai	PS1	
2002	Tales of Destiny 2	La Ville Clemente ラヴィル・クレメンテ	PS1 / PS2	
2002–2004	InuYasha games	Kensuke Sakai 刀々斎	PS1 / PS2	
2003	Everybody's Golf 4	Garuda ガルーダ	PS1 / PS2	
2006	Tales of Destiny	Clemente クレメンテ	PS1 / PS2	
2008	Tatsunoko vs. Capcom: Cross Generation of Heroes	Boyacky, Xavier	Wii	
2009	Super Robot Wars NEO	Pancho · Poncho パンチョ・ポンチョ	Wii	
2010	Tatsunoko vs. Capcom: Ultimate All-Stars	Boyacky	Wii	
