= Miho Kanno =

Japanese actress and singer (born 1977)

- 菅野 美穂
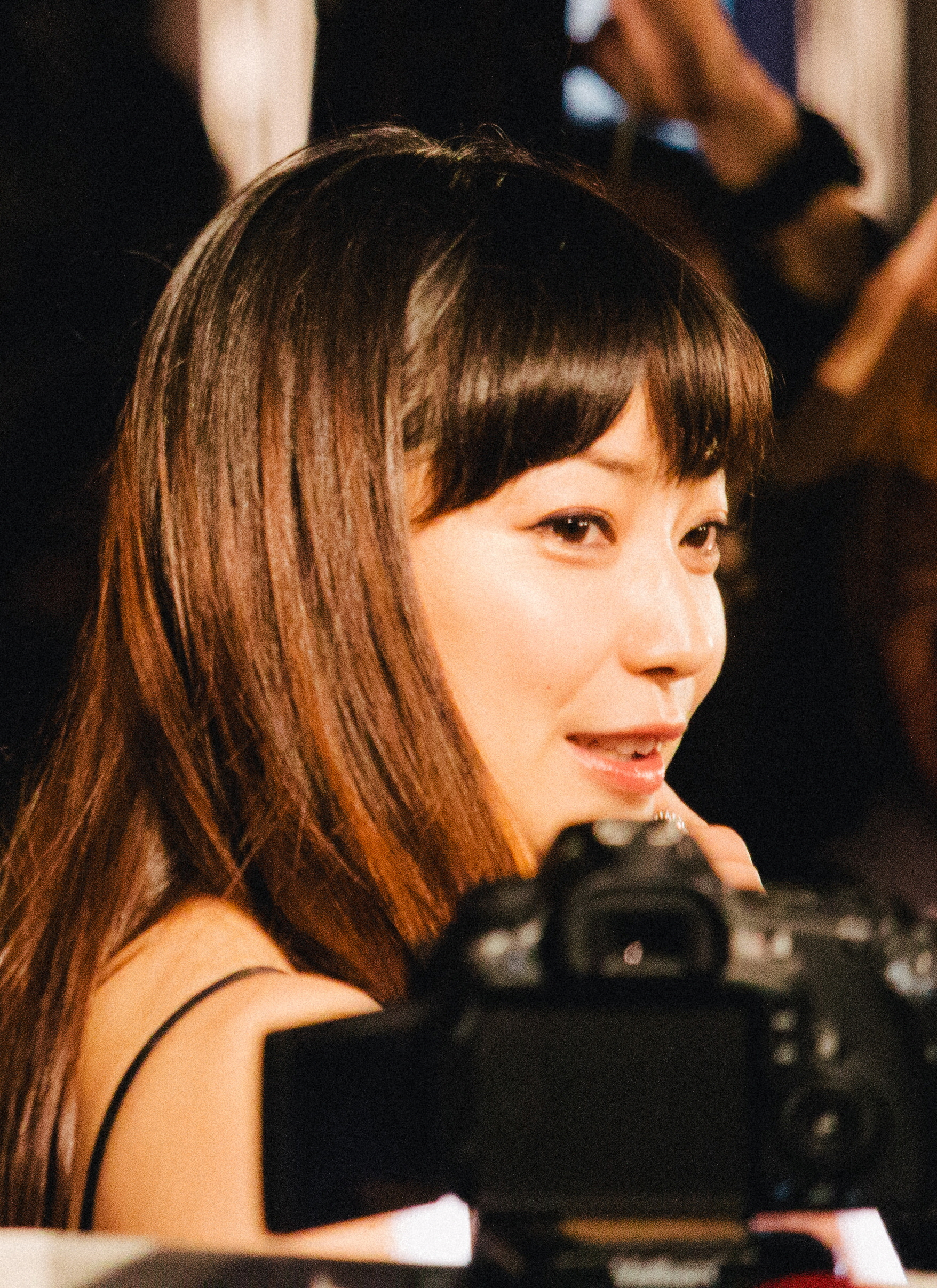
- Kanno at 27th Tokyo International Film Festival
- Born: August 22, 1977 (age 49); Isehara, Kanagawa, Japan
- Other names: Suga-chan (菅ちゃん); Kanno-chan (カンノちゃん)
- Occupations: Actress, singer
- Years active: 1992–present
- Spouse: Masato Sakai (m. 2013)
- Children: 2

Japanese name
- Kanji: 菅野 美穂
- Hiragana: かんの みほ
- Katakana: カンノ ミホ
Transcriptions
- Romanization: Kanno Miho

Miho Kanno (菅野 美穂, Kanno Miho; born August 22, 1977) is a Japanese actress and J-Pop singer. Her nicknames are Suga-chan (菅ちゃん) and Kanno-chan (カンノちゃん).

== Career ==
Kanno was born in Isehara, Kanagawa, Japan on August 22, 1977. Growing up in Sakado, Saitama, she graduated from Shukutoku-yono High School and attended Shukutoku University, where she studied Communications. In 1992, during her third year at junior high school, Kanno made her debut as a member of a group called Sakurakko Club after passing the orientation for the television variety show Sakurakko Kurabu. As a member of the Sakura Gumi, she started to participate actively for the group's second single "DO-shite". Because the group was one that allowed its members to undertake their own individual endeavors, Kanno increased her level of work outside the variety show, while remaining as a regular in the show, appearing in Japanese television dramas, commercials and gravure magazines.

In 1993, she made her television drama debut in Twins Kyōshi (Twins Teacher), and has continued to appear in dramas ever since. She also provided the voice of Rami Nanahikari in the video game Keio Flying Squadron. In 1996, Kanno appeared in the drama Iguana Girl, adapted from the manga by Moto Hagio. She reprised her role as Rami in Keio Flying Squadron 2, and voiced the character Nana Takamura in Real Sound: Kaze no Regret in 1997. She was replaced with Miki Nagasawa for Rami-chan no Ōedo Sugoroku: Keiō Yūgekitai Gaiden in 1998. Afterwards, she continued to take on lead roles in several television and live stage dramas. Her role as Mieko Nobe in Your Hands are Whispering, a deaf and mute person trying to overcome hearing deficiencies while trying to build a family, won the general public opinion vote, which later translated into several awards for her, such as the ATP Award and "Erando-ru New Talent" Award.

At the same time, Kanno began pursuing her solo music career, making her debut on March 24, 1995 with "Koi o Shiyō!" (Let's Fall in Love!), after Sakura Gumi disbanded. Her first album was released later that year. She also participated in photography modeling. On August 22, 1997 (Kanno's 20th birthday), a book featuring nude photographs taken by Miyzawa Masaaki titled Nudity went on sale. Despite Kanno herself causing some controversy by crying at a press conference and criticizing the weekly magazine that had previously exposed the book's content, Nudity was one of 1997 top-ten bestselling books in Japan, selling 540,000 copies by June 2003. Some estimates suggest that 820,000 copies were sold.

Besides starring in dramas, Kanno is also active in variety shows. In 2005, she featured in the Fuji TV show Burogu Taipu as a regular. While Kanno is mostly focused on acting, she still continues to sing.

== Personal life ==
Kanno has two younger brothers. Her parents live in Ōshū, Iwate.

On April 2, 2013, Kanno registered her marriage with fellow actor Masato Sakai in Tokyo.

She has two children with her husband, eldest being a boy born in 2015 and the younger being a girl born in 2018.

== Filmography ==
=== Television ===
Year	Title	Role	Notes	Ref.
1993	Ichigo Hakusho	High School Girl		
1993	Twins Teacher	Keiko Konihata		
1994	The Girl Who Leapt Through Time	Megumi Okamoto	Miniseries	
1996	Hashirannka!	Mari Miura	Asadora	
1996	Iguana Girl	Rika Aoshima	Lead role	
1996	Doku	Li Ming		
1997	Ii Hito.	Taeko Sakura		
1997	A Lost Paradise	Chika Kuki		
1997–2001	Your Hands are Whispering	Mieko Nobe	Lead role	
1998	Osorubeshi!!! Otonashi Karensan	Yoshimi Kosaka		
1998	Days	Nanako Ikeuchi		
1998	Setsunai: Tokyo Heart Break			
1998	Love Again	Kaori Kusumoto		
1998	Sommelier	Naho Kizaki		
1998	Change!			
1998	Tsurukame Waltz	Ayuko Katsuragi	Lead role	
1999	Isn't Being Cute Enough?	Yuko's Senior	Episode 10	
1999	Miracle of Love	Yukino Kurata	Lead role	
1999	Lovers on the Sand	Hitomi Tomoda	Episode 1	
1999	The Neighbours Are Secretly Laughing	Hiromi	Episodes 4 and 5	
2000	Please Give Me Love	Ririka Tōno	Lead role	
2000	The Story of One Century	Yuka Yashiro	Episode 1	
2001	Men's Luck in 2001	Ataru Yuzuki	Lead role	
2001	Churasan	Maria Jōnouchi	Asadora	
2001	I Wanna Fall in Love!!	Mikan Nagashima		
2001	Toward a Brighter Side, Toward a Brighter Side	Yutaka Tanabe	Television film	
2002	100 Tales of Horror	Oiwa Iemon	Lead role; episode 1	
2002	Flowers for Algernon	Erina Toya		
2003	Ōoku	Tenshō-in	Lead role	
2003	Kofuku no Oji	Umi Yasumoto		
2003–2007	Churasan 2, 3, 4	Maria Jōnouchi	3 seasons	
2004	To the One I Love	Shiki	Lead role	
2005	Last Present	Taeko Kanzaki	Lead role	
2005	Song of Love	Yōko Matsuda	Lead role	
2006	Dance Drill	Miyuki Takamiya	Special appearance	
2007	Chiaki Mukai: The Woman Who Pursued her Dreams into Space	Chiaki Mukai	Lead role; television film	
2007	Our Textbook	Tamako Tsumiki	Lead role	
2007	Hataraki Man	Hiroko Matsukata	Lead role	
2008	Tomorrow	Aiko Tanaka		
2009	Kiina	Kiina Haruse	Lead role	
2009–2011	Clouds Over the Hill	Ritsu Masaoka		
2010	The Unbending Woman	Saki Ogiwara	Lead role	
2010	Guilty: The Woman Who Made a Pact with the Devil	Meiko Nogami	Lead role	
2016	Beppin-san	Hana Bando (narrator)	Asadora	
2016	Tower of Sand	Aki Takano	Lead role	
2017	Leaders 2	Kiyo Iida	Television film	
2017	Prison Princesses	Chinatsu Katsuta		
2017	Hiyokko	Setsuko Kawamoto	Asadora	
2021	Date My Daughter!	Aoi Minase	Lead role	
2023	Yuria's Red String of Fate	Yuria Izawa	Lead role	

=== Films ===
Year	Title	Role	Notes	Ref.
1995	Eko Eko Azarak: Wizard of Darkness	Mizuki Kurahashi	Lead role	
1998	Falling into the Evening	Hanako Nezu		
1999	Tomie	Tomie Kawakami	Lead role	
1999	Saimin	Yuka Irie	Lead role	
2002	Makeup Artist Kewaishi	Sumie Aono	Lead role	
2002	Dolls	Sawako	Lead role	
2004	Lady Joker	Yoshiko Shiroyama		
2007	Sakuran	Shohi		
2008	Pandaful Life	Narrator		
2011	Gene Waltz	Rie Sonozaki	Lead role	
2011	Tomie: Unlimited	Tomie (cameo)		
2017	A Loving Husband	Igarashi Shinju		
2021	Tomorrow's Dinner Table	Rumiko	Lead role	
2023	Baian the Assassin, M.D.	Omon		
2023	Baian the Assassin, M.D. 2	Omon		
2024	Dear Family	Yōko Tsuboi		
2025	Kinki	Chihiro Seno	Lead role	
2025	Fuzjko: Everlasting Melody	Narrator	Documentary	
2026	90 Meters	Misaki Fujimura	Lead role	

=== Japanese dub ===
Year	Title	Role	Notes	Ref.
2014	Big Hero 6	Cass Hamada		
2018–2021	Big Hero 6: The Series	Cass Hamada		
2019	Gemini Man	Danielle "Danny" Zakarewski		
2023	Wish			

=== Video games ===
Year	Title	Role	Notes	Ref.
1993	Keio Flying Squadron	Rami Nanahikari		
1996	Keio Flying Squadron 2	Rami Nanahikari		
1997	Real Sound: Kaze no Regret	Nana Takamura		

== Discography ==
=== Albums ===
Studio albums
Title	Details	Ref.
Happy Ice Cream	Released: August 2, 1995	

=== Singles ===
As lead artist

Title	Year	Ref.
"Koi o Shiyō!"	1995	
"Taiyo ga Suki!"	1995	
"Makenai Anata ga Suki"	1996	
"Anoko ja nai"	1996	
"Zoo: Ai o Kudasai"	2000	

== Awards ==
- Best Supporting Actress, 27th Hochi Film Awards, for her role as Sawako in Dolls (2002)
- Newcomer of the Year, 22nd Elan d'or Awards (1998)
