= Ihatovo Monogatari =

1993 video game

- Box art
- Developer: Hector
- Publisher: Hector
- Composer: Tsukasa Tawada
- Platform: Super Famicom
- Release: JP: March 5, 1993
- Genre: Adventure
- Mode: Single-player

Ihatovo Monogatari (Note: Japanese: イーハトーヴォ物語; lit. 'Ihatovo Story') is a 1993 adventure video game for the Super Famicom. It was developed and published by Hector, a small Japanese game development company. The game visually has similarities to role-playing video games of the era, but features no combat or levelling-up systems. The game adapts several fairy tales by the Children's literature author Kenji Miyazawa and predominantly features gameplay of collecting items and talking to non-playable characters. The ultimate goal in the game is to travel to the various areas and to gather the seven notebooks hidden within them.

Contemporary critics in Japanese video game magazines Hippon Super! and Famitsu complimented the atmosphere and narrative of the game, with some reviewers saying that it may prove to be frustrating and tedious in terms of gameplay. Retrospective reviews from Hardcore Gaming 101 also complimented the game's atmosphere, while Vícto Navarro-Remesal wrote Ihatovo Monogatari was an early precursor to games like Harvest Moon (1996) that displayed RPG-like visuals, but featured no battle gameplay.

== Gameplay ==
The visuals in Ihatovo Monogatari resemble contemporary Japanese RPGs, while gameplay consists of exploring and talking to characters.

In his book Zen and Slow Games (2026), author Víctor Navarro-Remesal described the game as being visually very similar to Role-playing video games (RPGs) of the era from Japan. This included its top-down perspective, several non-playable characters (NPCs) to interact with and a world map to explore. He ultimately described it as an adventure game as it contained no combat or any form of action gameplay and no ability to level-up. Gameplay mechanics in Ihatovo Monogatari predominantly consists of conversations with NPCs, exploration and hunting for items.

The ultimate goal of the game is to collect seven notebooks through the various worlds. The player must complete the earlier tasks to trigger the needed events in a town, which then unlocks a new location can be accessed through the world map which displays once a user leaves a city. Areas become inaccessible once the player moves to a new location.

== Development ==
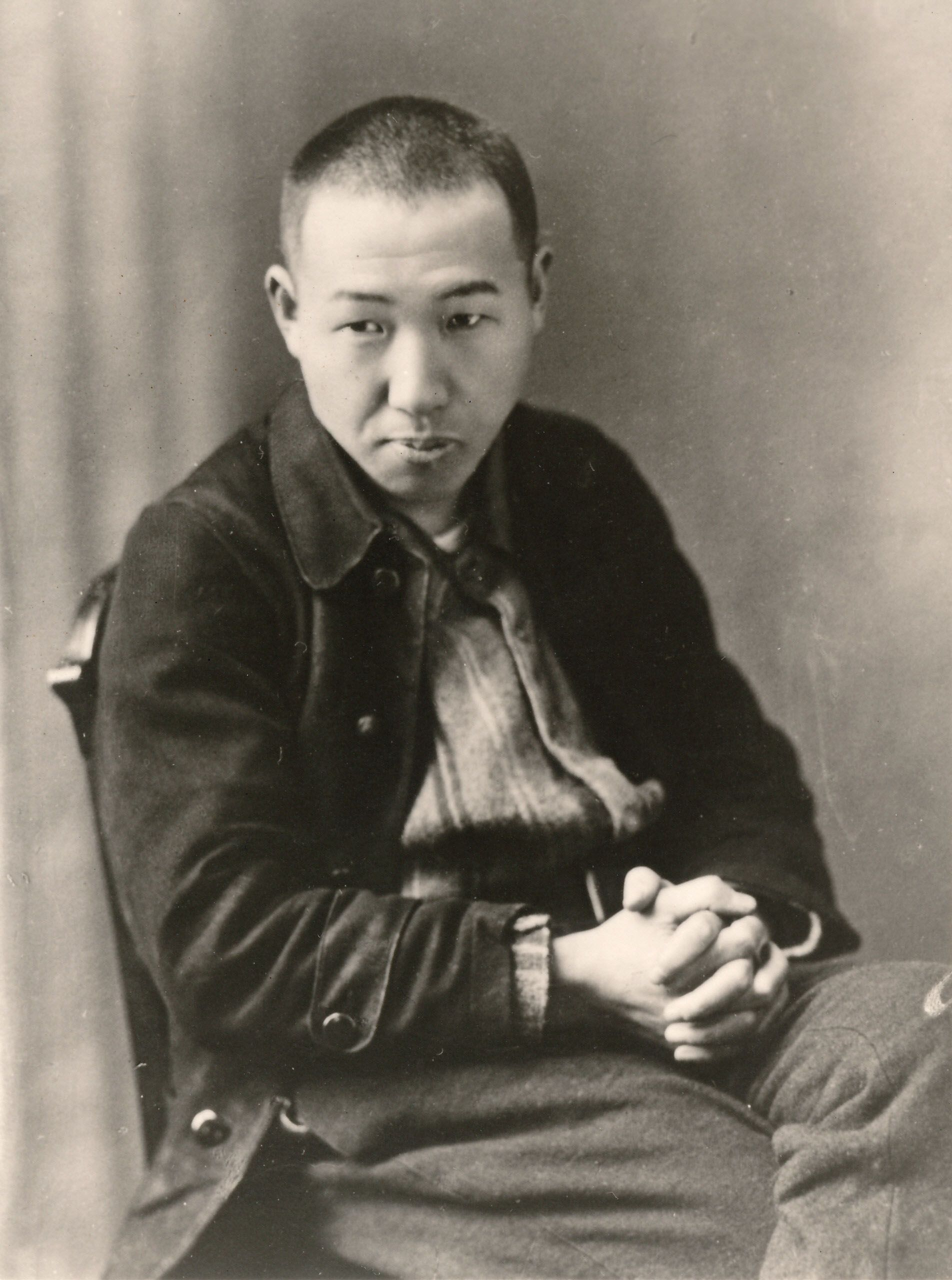
Ihatovo Monogatari is based on the stories written by Kenji Miyazawa.

Ihatovo Monogatari was developed by Hector, who were a smaller Japanese development team that predominantly created simulation games. The game adapts several fairy tales by the Children's literature author Kenji Miyazawa. Among the stories adapted into the game are Night on the Galactic Railroad (1934) and Gauche the Cellist (1934).

The game's music was composed by Tsukasa Tawada. Afterward, he was hired by Enix as a sound designer and worked on various games in the Dragon Quest and various Pokémon spin-off games.

One of the works in the game is called "Ihatōvo Sanka" (Note: イーハトーヴォ賛歌; lit. 'Ihatovo Hymn'). Tawada spoke about its creation later saying that he made the song in a city surrounding by buildings when he was struggling financially. He said he believed the song came from his own yearning for an ideal world.

== Reception ==
Reception

Review scores
Publication	Score
Famitsu	9/10, 5/10, 7/10, 6/10
Hippon Super!	6/10
Marukatsu Super Famicom	6/10, 7/10, 6/10, 9/10
The Super Famicom	59/100

Ihatovo Monogatari was released and published by Hector for the Super Famicom on March 5, 1993. It was never released outside of Japan and Hector went bankrupt in 2002.

The game was reviewed by four critics in the Japanese magazine Famitsu. The reviewers all complimented the games narrative. Two discussed the atmosphere of the game with one reviewer calling it strange and another saying that if a player was feeling sentimental and want to travel, the game would be perfect. Reviewers in The Super Famicom and Marukatsu Super Famicom magazines complimented on the games atmosphere ranging from describing it as "undescribable" and giving the player warm pleasing feelings. A reviewer in the latter magazine said in a world full of brutal games, you can't help but root for more experimental titles like Ihatovo Monogatari and Otogirisō (1992).

Three reviewers found the gameplay mechanics slow and tedious with a constant cycle of moving from one spot to another, and that this led to the sense of accomplishment when finishing the game feel weak. One reviewer was curious to see the general response to the game, particularly from an audience who were more accustomed to the standards set by the popular RPGs of the era. One of the Famitsu reviewers also praised the music, scenario and artwork as being very emotionally moving and made the game their "Best Picks of This Week" (for March 1 to 7, 1993) along with Albert Odyssey and Star Fox. A reviewer in Hippon Super! magazine complimented the game for its ambition but said it was constrained by the conventions of video games as a whole, suggesting that it felt forced to incorporate tasks such as collecting items or gathering information.

From later commentary, a reviewer for Hardcore Gaming 101 described the game as being like "playing a novel" due its linearity. They found that locations like Ihatovo Town were vast and populated which lead to walking through it as being pleasant. They lamented that the visuals, while being pleasant, aimed for the more poetic tone of Miyazawa's work over the more dream-like tone of stories like Night on the Galactic Railroad.

== Legacy ==
Navarro-Remesal described Ihatovo Monogatari as an early pre-cursor to games like Harvest Moon (1996) that displayed RPG-like visuals, but featured no battle gameplay. He described Ihatovo Monogatari, and later games like Flower (2009), Abzû (2016) as being iyashikei, a genre of Japanese fiction that portrays quiet and peaceful lives with the ultimate purpose of having a soothing effect on their audience.

In 2012, "Ihatōvo Sanka" was performed at the 7th annual Press Start: Symphony of Games orchestral concerts in Tokyo. At the concert. One of the concert's organizers, Nobuo Uematsu, spoke about the song at the performance, saying that he wanted to have "Ihatōvo Sanka" performed since the very first concert in the Press Start series.

== See also ==
- List of Super Nintendo Entertainment System games
