= Roger L. Jackson =

American voice actor

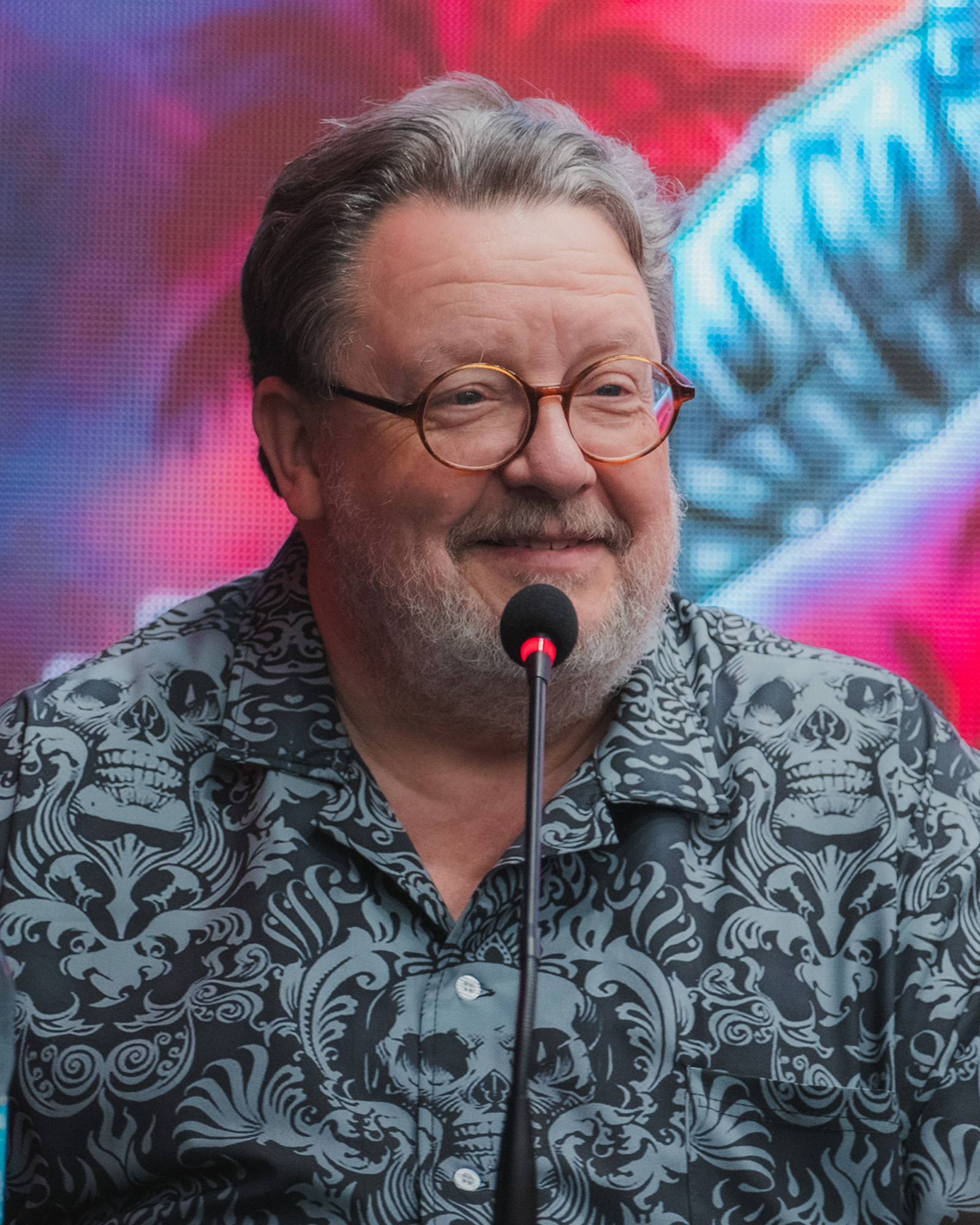
- Jackson in 2025
- Born: Roger Labon Jackson; July 13; Atlanta, Georgia, U.S.
- Occupation: Voice actor
- Years active: 1993–present

Roger Labon Jackson (born July 13) is an American voice actor, best known for voicing Ghostface in the Scream franchise (1996–present) and Mojo Jojo and Butch on The Powerpuff Girls.

== Career ==
Jackson is known for providing the voice for the serial killer Ghostface in the Scream film franchise. He has also appeared in animated films and television series such as The Walt Disney Company's The Book of Pooh. Jackson also voiced the primate supervillain Mojo Jojo and the Rowdyruff Boy Butch on the Cartoon Network animated series The Powerpuff Girls. His Mojo Jojo voice is later featured in The Powerpuff Girls Movie and Cartoon Network's FusionFall online video game.

Jackson has also had roles in the video game industry; voicing heroes for Galleon and Baldur's Gate, robots in Thrillville: Off the Rails and working for several Star Wars and Star Trek titles. On top of that, he provides voices for all the original cats on the Catz virtual pet program. He has contributed to Final Fantasy X and King's Quest VII and has done educational programs for both The Learning Company and Broderbund. For American McGee's Alice and its sequel, Alice: Madness Returns, he has also provided the voices for the Cheshire Cat, the Mad Hatter, the Dormouse and the Jabberwock. He played the tyrant Colonel Nohman from Zone of the Enders and Zone of the Enders: The 2nd Runner. He also voiced John O'Conner in Delphine Software International's Fade to Black. He also featured in Telltale Games’s The Walking Dead: The Game as Chuck/Charles.

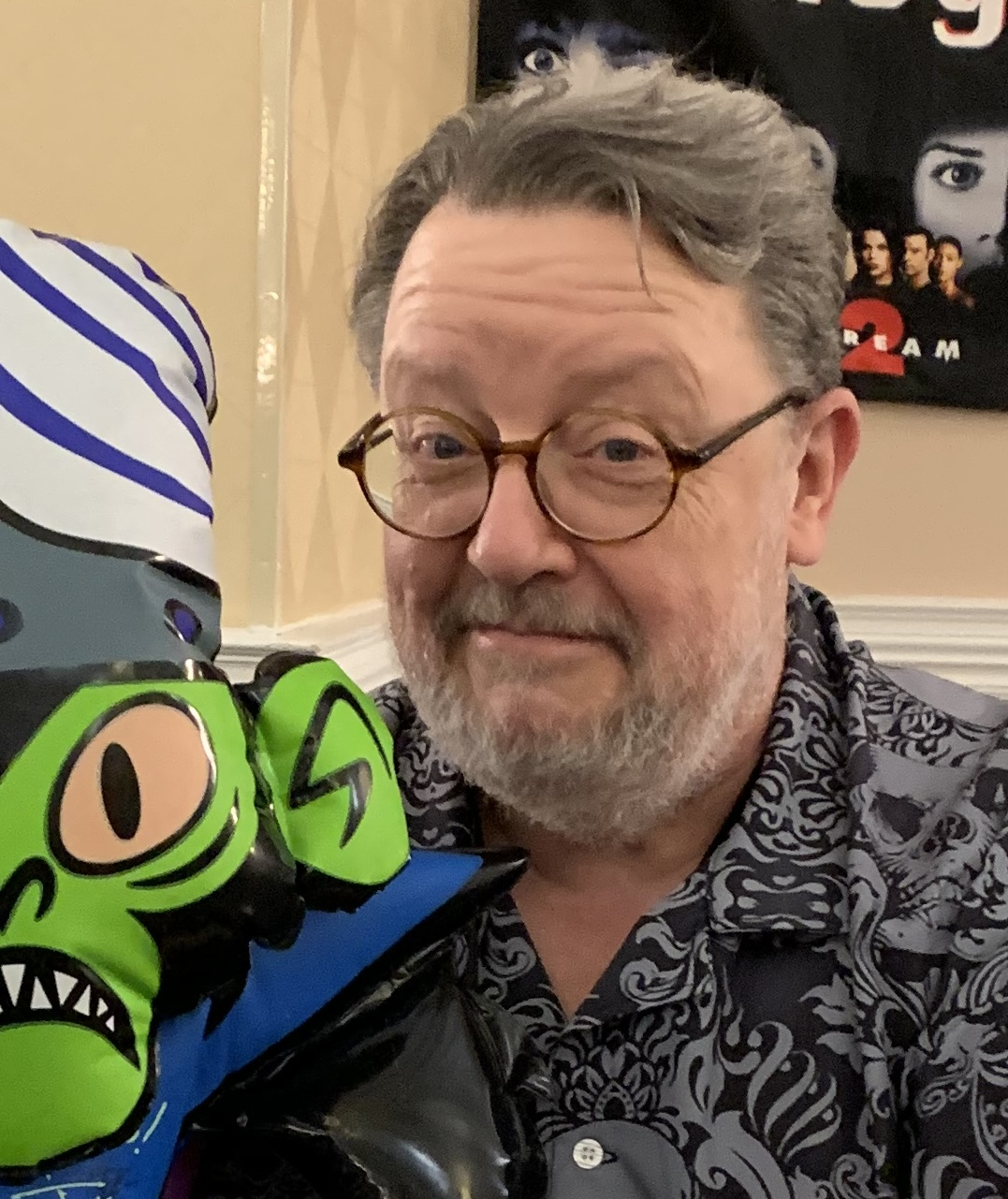
Jackson and Mojo Jojo at Monster-Mania Con

Jackson voiced Mr. Mucus in Mucinex ads for ten years, originating the rough New Yorker characterization in 2004.

On October 10, 2017, Keke Palmer confirmed in an interview that Jackson, who voiced Ghostface in the film series, would reprise the role for the third season of the slasher television series Scream, replacing Mike Vaughn, who served as the voice for two characters, the Lakewood Slasher in the first two seasons and the Shallow Grove Slasher in the Halloween special episodes following the second season. The season premiered on VH1 on July 8, 2019.

Jackson reprised his voice role as Ghostface in the fifth Scream film, which was directed by Matt Bettinelli-Olpin and Tyler Gillett. The film was released on January 14, 2022. He later returned to voice Ghostface in Scream VI, which released on March 10, 2023, and returned in Scream 7, which was released on February 27, 2026.

== Filmography ==
=== Film ===
Year	Title	Role	Notes	Ref(s)
1996	Mars Attacks!	Translator Device		
1996	Scream	Ghostface (voice)		
1997	Scream 2	Ghostface (voice)		
2000	Scream 3	Ghostface (voice)		
2000	Titan A.E.	First Alien		
2001	Monkeybone	Arnold the Super Reaper		
2002	The Powerpuff Girls Movie	Mojo Jojo		
2002	The Wild Thornberrys Movie	Reggie (Squirrel), Thunder		
2004	Home on the Range	Tommy the Ox		
2004	Van Helsing: The London Assignment	Drunken Gentleman	Direct-to-video	
2004	The Chronicles of Riddick: Dark Fury	Junner	Direct-to-video	
2005	Mr. Incredible and Pals	Narrator, Evil Cornhead		
2007	Happily N'ever After	Additional Voices		
2007	Film Noir	Detective Riley, Dr. Kaplanski, Bearded Man, Honest George, Dr. Barnes, Bank Manager, DaVinci, TV Reporter, Krumb, Pilot, Policeman 1, Policeman 2		
2010	Cats & Dogs: The Revenge of Kitty Galore	Inmate Fat Cat		
2011	Scream 4	Ghostface		
2011	Still Screaming: The Ultimate Scary Movie Retrospective	Himself (voice)	Documentary film	
2013	Khumba	Walkie Talkie, Black Eagle		
2017	Monster Island	Nicholas		
2022	Scream	Ghostface (voice)	Jackson recognized in specialized closing credits	
2023	Scream VI	Ghostface (voice)	Jackson recognized in specialized closing credits	
2026	Scream 7	Ghostface (voice)	Jackson recognized in specialized closing credits	
2027	Winnie-the-Pooh: Blood and Honey 3 – The Lost Years	Rabbit (voice)		

=== Television ===
Year	Title	Role	Notes	Ref(s)
1998–2005	The Powerpuff Girls	Mojo Jojo, Butch, Additional Voices	44 episodes	
1999	Celebrity Deathmatch	Mel Gibson, Groucho Marx	2 episodes	
2001–2004	The Book of Pooh	Mr. Narrator	45 episodes	
2001	The Zeta Project	Richards	Episode: "Change of Heart"	
2003–2004	JoJo's Bizarre Adventure	Hol Horse	English dub	
2004	Evil Con Carne	Mojo Jojo Impression	Episode: "Jealousy, Jealous Do/Hector, King of the Britons"	
2005–2022	Robot Chicken	Various Voices	3 episodes	
2006	Codename: Kids Next Door	Clownfather	Episode: "Operation: C.L.O.W.N."	
2009–2011	Regular Show	Evil Voice, Baby #1	3 episodes	
2011	Scream: The Inside Story	Himself (voice)	Documentary film	
2013	The Legend of Korra	Male Nomad	Episode: "Beginnings, Part 2"	
2016–2019	The Powerpuff Girls	Mojo Jojo, Additional Voices	44 episodes	
2016	Teen Titans Go!	Mojo Jojo	Episode: "TTG v PPG"	
2018	Little Big Awesome	Mr. Sprinkles, Space Crab, Lamp Post, Tito	6 episodes	
2019	Scream: Resurrection	Ghostface	5 episodes	
2025	Jellystone!	Mojo Jojo	Episode: "Crisis on Infinite Mirths"	
2025	Devil May Cry	Plasma, Griff	5 episodes	

=== Video games ===
Year	Title	Role	Notes	Ref(s)
1993	Keio Flying Squadron	Dr. Pon Eho, Grandma, Grandpa, Narrator, Additional Voices	English version	
1994	King's Quest VII: The Princeless Bride	Cuddles, Kangaroo Rat, Three-Headed Carnivorous Plant, Snake Oil Salesman, Ghoul Kid #1		
1995	Fade to Black	John O' Conner		
1995	Space Quest 6	Hotel Manager		
1996	Keio Flying Squadron 2	Spot Nanahikari, Dr. Pon Eho, Grandma, Grandpa, Additional Voices	English version	
1996	Star Trek: Deep Space Nine: Harbinger	Scythians		
1996	The Lost Files of Sherlock Holmes: The Case of the Rose Tattoo	Dr. Watson, Professor Moriarty		
1996	Soviet Strike	Additional Voices		
1997	Reader Rabbit Kindergarten	Spike		
1998	Clock Tower II: The Struggle Within	Bates		
1998	Tiger Woods '99	Announcer	Windows version	
1998	Reader Rabbit: 2nd Grade	Sam the Lion		
1999	Reader Rabbit Math Ages 6–9	Cheeseter		
1999	Star Wars: Episode I: Racer	Ark "Bumpy" Roose, Ebe Endocott		
2000	American McGee's Alice	The Cheshire Cat, The Mad Hatter, The Jabberwock, Bill McGill, The March Hare, The Dormouse		
2000	Baldur's Gate II: Shadows of Amn	Keldorn		
2000	Jet Set Radio	Additional Voices		
2000	Road Rash: Jailbreak	In game voices		
2000	The Lion King: Simba's Mighty Adventure	Hyena		
2001	Zone of the Enders	Nohman, Axe	English version	
2001	Final Fantasy X	Maester Wen Kinoc	English version	
2001	Star Wars: Galactic Battlegrounds	Echuu Shen-Jon, Jedi Padawan, Mahwi Lihnn		
2001	The Powerpuff Girls: Chemical X-Traction	Mojo Jojo		
2002	Star Wars Racer Revenge	Kraid Nemmeso		
2002	Star Wars: Jedi Starfighter	Captain Orsai, Generic Toth, Pilot #1, Nym Ground Unit		
2002	Star Trek: Starfleet Command III	Additional Voices		
2002	Shinobi	Hiruko Ubusuna (Old)	English version	
2002	Superman: The Man of Steel	Metallo		
2002	The Powerpuff Girls: Relish Rampage	Mojo Jojo		
2002	Scooby-Doo! The Glowing Bug Man	Nigel Nightwatch, Ralph Rosen, Billy Seasons		
2002	Star Wars: Galactic Battlegrounds: Clone Campaigns	B-wing Pilot, Echuu Shen-Jon, Rebel Trooper		
2003	Zone of the Enders: The 2nd Runner	Nohman	English version	
2003	Cyber Troopers Virtual-On Marz	Narrator	English version	
2003	Final Fantasy X-2	Incidental characters	English version	
2004	Lifeline	Gino		
2004	Galleon	Rhama Sabrier		
2004	The Sims 2	Elder Male Sim		
2004	Blood Will Tell: Tezuka Osamu's Dororo	Redcap	English version	
2004	Star Wars Knights of the Old Republic II: The Sith Lords	Additional Voices		
2004	Bujingai: The Forsaken City	Naguri Tensai		
2005	Star Wars: Republic Commando	Automated Ship Voice, Clone Trooper Lieutenant, Clone Troopers, Gunship Pilot		
2005	Jade Empire	Lord Yun		
2005	Rogue Galaxy	Burton Willis	English version	
2005	Crash Tag Team Racing	Willie Wumpa Cheeks, Park Drones		
2005	Yakuza	Shintaro Fuma	English version	
2005	Light Rangers: Mending the Maniac Madness	Dr. Nono, Maniac Brainiac	English version	
2005	TriJinx: A Kristine Kross	Anwar Mahfouz, Dr. James Kross, Bast the Cat		
2005	Altered Beast	Agent		
2006	Baten Kaitos Origins	Verus		
2006	The Lord of the Rings: The Battle for Middle-earth II	Gríma Wormtongue, Mouth of Sauron		
2006	Final Fantasy XII	Emperor Gramis Gana Solidor	English version	
2006	Bone: The Great Cow Race	Alvie		
2006	Hitman: Blood Money	Alexander Leland Cayne		
2006	Phantasy Star Universe	Do Vol		
2006	Cartoon Network Racing	Mojo Jojo		
2006	Sam & Max Save the World	Abe Lincoln		
2007	MySims	Sim		
2007	Thrillville: Off the Rails	Barry Von Richtoven, Tal-8850, Bandito Chinchilla, Robot		
2007	Shining Force EXA	Ragnadaam III, Garyu, Bornay the Merchant, Gantetsu	English version	
2007	Spider-Man: Friend or Foe	Norman Osborn / Green Goblin, Dr. Curt Connors / Lizard		
2007	Mass Effect	Administrator Anoleis, Engineer Adams, Harkin		
2007	Nights: Journey of Dreams	Wizeman		
2007	Sam and Max: Beyond Time and Space	Abe Lincoln, Storm Moai, Zombie Abraham Lincoln		
2008	Valkyria Chronicles	Gen. Berthold Gregor, Coby Caird, Gallian Officer, Imperial Officer	English version	
2008	Star Wars: The Force Unleashed	Death Star Technician		
2008	Spider-Man: Web of Shadows	Green Goblin, Miscellaneous		
2008	MySims Kingdom	Additional Voices		
2009	Cartoon Network Universe: FusionFall	Mojo Jojo		
2009	MadWorld	Tengu, Shogun Kokushimuso, Man A		
2009	Tales of Monkey Island	Bartender, Hemlock McGee, Reginald Van Winslow		
2009	The Secret of Monkey Island: Special Edition	Spiffy the SCUMM Bar Dog, Bridge Troll, JoJo, Freddy Man of Low Moral Fiber, Pirate Leader 2		
2009	MySims Agents	Sim		
2009	Brütal Legend	SFXs		
2009	Phantasy Star Portable	Do Vol		
2010	Mass Effect 2	Harkin, Dr. Chandana, Freelancer, Refugee, Additional Voices		
2010	Deadly Premonition	General Lysander, Jack the Raging Bull, Wesley the Gunsmith		
2010	Iron Man 2	A.I.M. Soldiers, S.H.I.E.L.D. Agents		
2010	Monkey Island 2 Special Edition: LeChuck's Revenge	Governor Phatt, Parrot, Bart		
2010	Bakugan: Defenders of the Core	Helios, Premo Vulcan		
2010	Star Wars: The Force Unleashed II	Stormtrooper #2, Additional Voices		
2010	Sam & Max: The Devil's Playhouse	General Skun-ka'pe, Grandpa Stinky, Guardian #2, Mole Grandpa, Ex Skun-ka'pe Minion, Charlie Ho-Tep, Abraham Lincoln, Beelzebub		
2010	Poker Night at the Inventory	Reginald Van Winslow		
2010	Nelson Tethers: Puzzle Agent	Sheriff Bahg, Agent Jennings		
2010–2011	Back to the Future: The Game	Cueball Donnely, Judge Erhardt Brown, Hampton, Ernie Philpott, Hostile Guy		
2011	Alice: Madness Returns	The Cheshire Cat, The Mad Hatter, The March Hare, The White Rabbit, Tweedledum		
2011	The Elder Scrolls V: Skyrim	Additional Voices		
2011	Star Wars: The Old Republic	Sel-Makor, Madaga-Ru, Elios Maliss, Ambassador Grub, Asa-Ku, Count Aide, DK-9, GenoHaradan, Herald of Karagga, Koru Tama, Lord Dak-Ah, Peema Ahuff, Remmy, Senator Tudos, Sorno, Technician Prand, Tookreek, Yelzrin, Yjal		
2011	Law & Order: Legacies	Alexander Baran, Mr. Huang, Defense Lawyer		
2011	Backstab	Bartholomew, Pizzaro		
2012	The Darkness II	Crudd, Additional Voices		
2012	Mass Effect 3	Engineer Adams, Urdnot Wreav, Additional Voices		
2012	The Walking Dead	Chuck, Logan, Stranger		
2012	Guild Wars 2	Ferghun		
2012	Dishonored	Anton Sokolov		
2013	Poker Night 2	Reginald Van Winslow		
2013	The Wolf Among Us	Ichabod Crane		
2014	The Lego Movie Videogame	Metalbeard, Additional Voices		
2014	Middle-earth: Shadow of Mordor	Saruman the White		
2014	Tales from the Borderlands	The Stranger, Gen. Pollux, Tour Guard, Additional Voices		
2014	Among the Sleep	Teddy		
2015	Lego Dimensions	Saruman, Mojo Jojo		
2015	Fallout 4	Lawrence Higgs, Institute Scientist		
2016	Star Ocean: Integrity and Faithlessness	Daril Camuze	English version	
2016	Dishonored 2	Anton Sokolov		
2016	Manual Samuel	Samuel		
2016	Kelvin and the Infamous Machine	Groobleu the Jester, Rock Paper Scissors Official, Sculptor, Prisoner		
2017	Minecraft: Story Mode	White Pumpkin, Additional Voices	Season 1	
2018	Red Dead Redemption 2	The Local Pedestrian Population		
2021	Call of Duty: Black Ops Cold War	Ghostface		
2021	Call of Duty: Warzone	Ghostface		
2023	Dead Space	Creature Vocalizations		
2023	Scream: The Game	Ghostface	Mobile application	
2024	Alone in the Dark	MacCarfey, Radio Voice		
2024	MultiVersus	Mojo Jojo, Butch		
2024	Mortal Kombat 1	Ghostface	"Khaos Reigns" downloadable content	
2025	Fortnite	Ghostface		

=== Live-action ===
Year	Title	Role	Notes
1998	Nash Bridges	Stuart	Episode: "Hot Prowler"
2000	Just One Night	Joe	

=== Music videos ===
Year	Title	Artist(s)	Role	Ref.
2026	"Twisting the Knife" (Part 2)	Ice Nine Kills featuring Mckenna Grace	Ghostface	

=== Audiobooks ===
Year	Title	Role	Notes	Reference(s)
2025	Your Favorite Scary Movie: How the Scream Films Rewrote the Rules of Horror	Narration		
