= Pokémon Battle Revolution =

2006 video game

- North American version cover art
- Developer: Genius Sonority
- Publishers: JP: The Pokémon Company; WW: Nintendo
- Director: Manabu Yamana
- Producers: Hiroyuki Jinnai; Hiroaki Tsuru
- Designers: Kuniko Kobashi; Hiroyoshi Kasama
- Programmer: Teruhito Yamaki
- Artist: James Turner
- Composer: Tsukasa Tawada
- Series: Pokémon
- Platform: Wii
- Release: JP: December 14, 2006; NA: June 25, 2007; AU: November 22, 2007; EU: December 7, 2007
- Genre: Turn-based strategy
- Modes: Single-player, multiplayer, multiplayer online

Pokémon Battle Revolution is a turn-based strategy video game in the Pokémon series developed by Genius Sonority and published by The Pokémon Company and Nintendo. It was released for the Wii on December 14, 2006, in Japan; on June 25, 2007, in North America; on November 22, 2007, in Australia, and on December 7, 2007, in Europe. Along with being the first Wii incarnation of the Pokémon video game franchise, it is also the first Wii game to use the Nintendo Wi-Fi Connection in North America and Japan and the second Wii game to wirelessly interact with the Nintendo DS handheld.

Pokémon Battle Revolution features eleven different colosseums in a Pokémon-themed park called Pokétopia. Other features include stadiums that have their own special effects, such as randomizing the order of one's Pokémon. Some other effects are choosing the order of an opponent's Pokémon and setting level limitations.

== Gameplay ==
The game features 11 different colosseums, each with special changes to normal play or prerequisites and a Colosseum Leader. The Crystal Colosseum holds battles in a 16-person single-elimination tournament mode. The Gateway Colosseum is only open to a rental pass holder, and Neon Colosseum uses a wheel to choose the player's and opponent's battling Pokémon. As the player progresses, the Pokémon available to rent become more powerful. The player also earns Poké-Coupons, the currency of this game. Coupons can be spent to customize the player character's in-game appearance with items such as apparel, face paint, and hair color. Unlike Pokémon Colosseum and Pokémon XD: Gale of Darkness, the game does not include a story mode.

A double battle: Dialga and Palkia against Kyogre and Groudon as featured in Nintendo Power

Pokémon attacks are also much more diverse, with each Pokémon acquiring its own animation for most moves in the game. Some animations feature both the attacking and defending Pokémon on screen at the same time. In previous console titles, the game only showed one Pokémon attacking and then cut away to the second getting hit by the attack.

Along with connectivity to the Nintendo DS games, a player can win Pokémon from this game and transfer them back to their DS games through Mystery Gift. This feature allows players to obtain Pokémon that are either hard or impossible to get without using a cheat device. To unlock the Pokémon, players must achieve certain goals or enter a special code. A Pikachu with the special moves Volt Tackle and Surf can be obtained by beating each Colosseum once, whereas an Electivire and a Magmortar can be obtained via special codes. In addition to the Pokémon download, players can purchase items like certain Technical Machines and evolution items.

=== Online functionality ===
Pokémon Battle Revolution is the first Pokémon home console title to go online in the United States as well as the first online game for the Wii console. It features two online modes; Battle with a Friend, which allows a player to battle a friend using a friend code, and Battle with Someone, which lets the player face off against a random opponent. After each random battle, players are given the chance to exchange trainer passes. The exchange must be mutual; it will not work if one of the two trainers refuses.

Nintendo DS controls cannot be used in online multiplayer. When playing random online battles, the player's trainer's custom greetings and Pokémon nicknames are all changed to its native nation's defaults; for example, a Japanese Magikarp (コイキング, Koiking) will show its Japanese name instead of its English one. All Pokémon (excluding Generation 5 and on) are allowed in random battles.

== Development ==
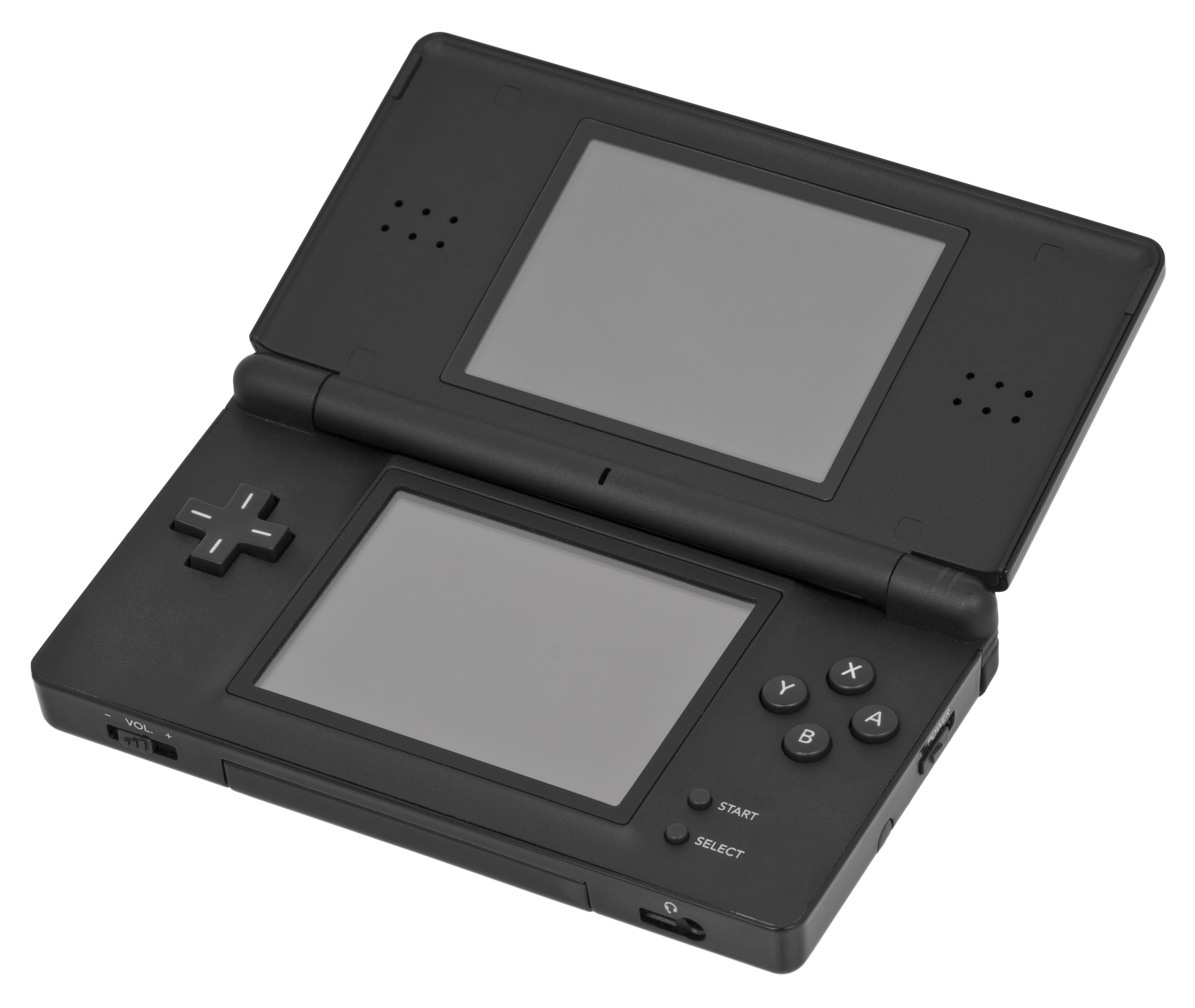
The game can connect with players' copies of Pokémon Diamond and Pearl on their Nintendo DS consoles.

The game was first announced by Nintendo president Satoru Iwata at a Nintendo marketing event in Japan on June 7, 2006. At the event, Iwata described Wii-to-DS connectivity using the game as an example, stating that gamers with either Pokémon Diamond and/or Pearl can play battles using their Diamond/Pearl Pokémon in Pokémon Battle Revolution, using their DS as a controller.

The DS linkup feature was accessible at 2006 Nintendo World Tour for the first time. As well as allowing Pokémon from a Pokémon Diamond or Pearl cartridge to be used in-game, it replaces the on-screen battle menu used in conjunction with the Wii Remote. The GameCube controller is not compatible with this game. The battle menu is displayed on the DS touchscreen instead, and it is navigated with the stylus. Four players can play in a 1-on-1 tournament much like the Battle Frontier Battle Dome in Pokémon Emerald.

== Reception ==
Reception

Aggregate score
Aggregator	Score
Metacritic	53/100

Review scores
Publication	Score
Game Informer	5.75/10
GamePro	3/5
GameSpy	3/5
GameTrailers	5.7/10
IGN	5/10
Yahoo	2.5/5

According to the review aggregate website Metacritic, Pokémon Battle Revolution received "mixed or average reviews". It received a score of 5.0 out of 10 from IGN, which cites that the game omits several features demonstrated in previous games like Pokémon Stadium and Pokémon Colosseum, such as a role-playing mode. The multiplayer and online functionality of the game is also criticized for lacking functions such as tournament play. GameSpot gave the game a 5.5 out of 10 score, criticizing the repetitive gameplay and the barebones online support, as well as the fact that if one did not have Pokémon Diamond or Pearl for the DS, there is not nearly as much to do. Game Informer rated it a 5.75 out of 10 saying the same things as GameSpot, and adding their own comment about a tutorial that teaches the player how to point the Wii Remote. Nintendo Power rated it a 6.5 out of 10, praising the game's multiplayer while criticizing its lack of single player features. Famitsu gave a positive review to the game, with a score of 35 out of 40. Another positive review is from Game Oracle who gave 75% who praised the online mode, graphics, and soundtrack. They criticised it for not being as good as XD: Gale of Darkness mainly due to the low amount of single-player content and the necessity of Pokémon Diamond and Pearl to open the entire game experience. The game currently has a 53.19% average of 34 aggregated reviews on both GameRankings, and Metacritic.

It sold 850,000 copies in North America and Western Europe and 352,123 copies in Japan, bringing its total sales to 1.202 million.
