= Harvest Moon: The Lost Valley =

2014 video game

- North American boxart
- Developers: Tabot, Inc. (Note: Nintendo Switch version developed by Muteki Games Collective)
- Publishers: NA: Natsume Inc.; EU/AU: Rising Star Games
- Director: Daisuke Shimizu
- Producers: Taka Maekawa; Masaru Yoshioka; Yoshiaki Iwasawa
- Designer: Seira Kobayashi
- Programmer: Syou Hamada
- Artists: Sanae Maekawa; Saki Imaizumi
- Writer: Seira Kobayashi
- Composer: Tsukasa Tawada
- Series: Harvest Moon
- Platforms: Nintendo 3DS; Nintendo Switch; Android; iOS
- Release: NA: November 4, 2014; EU: June 19, 2015; AU: June 20, 2015
- Genres: Farm simulation, role-playing
- Mode: Single-player

Harvest Moon: The Lost Valley, known in North America as Harvest Moon 3D: The Lost Valley, is a farm simulation role-playing game developed by Japanese game development studio Tabot, Inc. for the Nintendo 3DS. It was released in North America on November 4, 2014, in Europe on June 19, 2015 and in Australia on June 20, 2015.

== Gameplay ==
Players (male is by default named Pete and female is by default named Claire) are able to modify their home such as expanding it and moving items around on the inside of their home, though the player's home cannot be moved from its original place. Players can also modify their world, including terrain elevations and building locations. Players are also able to get married, have a child, buy pets and help villagers with requests.

== Plot ==
The player arrives in Hillsville, a village located up in the mountains, which is stuck in an eternal winter. They meet a Harvest Sprite named Rowan, who requests their help in reviving the village. After the Harvest Goddess is revived, Rowan returns her bracelet to her. The goddess is unable to end the eternal winter unless the player helps to restore the three Season Crystals. As the player progresses through the story, new characters begin to move into the village. After reviving three more Harvest Sprites, they are able to restore the Spring Crystals. Later, after reviving another Harvest Sprite, the player grows a tree that allows them to reach the Harvest God's domain and he helps recreate the Summer Crystal. Learning that they will need the assistance of the underworld king Gorgan (who is the one responsible for the village's current state) to restore the Fall Crystal, the player gains access to his lair, but he stubbornly refuses to help. After reviving a Harvest Sprite who has a close relationship with Gorgon, they learn from Gorgan that they must grow a special crop called the Blessed Fruit to restore the last crystal, which is considered impossible. Despite this, the player manages to succeed in growing the Blessed Tree just as a storm strikes. An unidentified Harvest Sprite, who is the one who led the player to Hillsville, urges Gorgan to calm his rage. The storm then stops and Gorgan appears, revealing that the reason why he stripped the land of life is due to people abusing it in the first place. Having regained his trust in humans, he reveals a surprise: the Blessed Fruit has turned into the Fall Crystal, allowing the Harvest Goddess to fully restore the land back to its former glory.

== Development ==
The game was announced during E3 2014 by Natsume Inc. Unlike previous titles in the Story of Seasons series, called Harvest Moon in the Western markets, the game was not developed by Japanese developer Marvelous. Their newest entry in the Story of Seasons series is being published in North America and Europe by Xseed Games. Natsume Inc. owns the rights to the "Harvest Moon" brand in those territories.

== Reception ==
Reception

Aggregate score
Aggregator	Score
Metacritic	46/100

Review scores
Publication	Score
4Players	38%
Electronic Gaming Monthly	4.5/10
Hardcore Gamer	2/5
Joystiq	2/5
Nintendo Life	4/10
RPGFan	57%
National Post	3/10

The game received "unfavorable" reviews according to the review aggregation website Metacritic.
