= Keio Flying Squadron 2 =

1996 video game

- European cover art
- Developer: Victor Entertainment
- Publishers: JP: Victor Entertainment; EU: JVC Musical Industries
- Directors: Yasushi Endo; Satoru Honda
- Designer: Teruhito Yamaki
- Artists: Naomasa Kitatani; Kenji Kawashima; Yoshiyuki Ozaki; Nobuyuki Ikigame; Daisuke Fukuda; Akito Kuroda; Masaru Yokōra
- Writer: Satoru Honda
- Composer: Tsukasa Tawada
- Platform: Sega Saturn
- Release: JP: May 17, 1996; EU: September 1996
- Genres: Platformer, scrolling shooter
- Mode: Single-player

Keio Flying Squadron 2 (Note: Keio Flying Squadron 2 (Japanese: 慶応遊撃隊活劇編, Hepburn: Keiō Yūgekitai: Katsugeki-hen; lit. 'Keio Flying Squadron: Action Movie Edition')) is a 1996 platform video game developed and published by Victor Entertainment for the Sega Saturn. It is a direct sequel to Keio Flying Squadron (1993). In a departure from the first game, a side-scrolling shoot 'em up, Keio Flying Squadron 2 is a platformer with shooter sections. The story follows series protagonist Rami Nanahikari as she joins a race to find the Secret Treasure.

Development began in 1994 for the Sega CD. Initially conceived as an enhanced version of the first game, the project was moved to the Saturn and evolved into a full sequel with new graphical features. Although 3D games were gaining popularity in the 1990s, the team decided to retain 2D gameplay and transitioned from a shoot-em-up to a platformer in order to implement new sprites that would show off the characters more prominently. Several planned features, including 3D bonus stages, were cut during development. As with the previous title, the game's animated cutscenes were produced by Studio Pierrot.

Keio Flying Squadron 2 was released in Japan in May 1996, with a release in Europe following in September. It received mixed reviews, with praise for its graphics and music but criticism for its controls. The game was followed by Rami-chan no Ōedo Sugoroku: Keiō Yūgekitai Gaiden in 1998.

== Plot ==
A year has passed since the apocalyptic disaster known as the "Ark Catastrophe", which left a great crater in the center of Edo. The destruction wrought major economic consequences and while much investment was poured into the public works for the new Edo Castle, the citizens were all feeling the pinch of the recession.

Dr. Pon Eho was no exception. Although a freak of nature with an astronomical IQ of 1400, hard reality forced the genius tanuki to become a laborer in the construction of the new castle. One day, while he was shoveling away some gravel near the center of the crater, he unearthed the Secret Treasure Scroll and one of the Six Magical Orbs (called Jewels in the Japanese version). With the knowledge that the six Orbs together would bring him an enormous amount of treasure, he quickly left his job in search of the remaining five Orbs listed on the Scroll's map.

Meanwhile, Himiko Yamatai, "the 13th Queen of Yamatai-koku", makes a dramatic appearance at the Nanahikari family's dinner table and grabs the family's Magical Orb. But before she can get away, Dr. Pon ambushes her and steals it. Of course, Rami makes chase and joins the race for the great treasure, starting her on her new adventure.

== Gameplay ==
The game mainly consists of side-scrolling platformer stages. Two of the stages retain the shoot-'em-up style of the first game, but the Homing Spot Jrs. can be obtained as bonuses only. Besides the platformer and shoot-'em-up stages, there are vertically scrolling bonus stages, a rollercoaster stage and an underwater stage, classifying the game as a multi-genre platformer.

Several bonuses can be collected including three weapons:

- Atami - The Hammer of Dreams - A large mallet, used only for hitting enemies.
- Kinugawa - The Umbrella of Love - An umbrella, used to hit enemies, float and deflect overhead obstacles.
- Kusatsu - The Arrow of Hope - A bow and arrow set, used to shoot arrows at enemies.

Rami can also bounce on the heads of enemies to defeat them, as well as Kappas to reach higher places. Being damaged without holding an item results in the loss of a life. Background objects can be pick up and thrown at enemies to defeat them. Some background objects can also have a utility use. There are three difficulty levels which alter how many enemies there are to defeat and how quickly weapons disappear after being damaged.

Points Orbs can be collected throughout the game. Defeating some enemies also rewards points, but there are some enemies that are considered passive and will instead deduct points when defeated. A reward system accessed from the main menu unlocks helpful hints and behind-the-scenes extras depending on the highest and lowest scores achieved through playing.

== Characters ==
Japanese names are given in the Western order, given name first.

- Rami Nanahikari - The 14-year-old grandchild of an ancient family and a descendant of aliens who came to Earth long ago. She wears a bunny suit, the formal attire of a Key Guardian. After her last adventure she was enjoying her life as an ordinary schoolgirl. However, now that she knows about the Secret Treasure, she has decided to join the battle between Dr. Pon and Himiko in search of it. Voiced by Miho Kanno (Japanese); Samantha Paris (English).
- Spot Nanahikari - The Nanahikari family's pet dragon, who has become like a younger brother to Rami. Because he worked so hard in the first game, he became soporose and now sleeps and nods out whenever he can. In this game, he has a supporting role assisting Rami. Spot is called Pochi in the Japanese release of the game. Voiced by Mika Kanai (Japanese); Samantha Paris (English; cutscenes); Roger L. Jackson (English; gameplay).
- "Grandma" (Note: "Grandma Shima" in Keiō Yūgekitai〈1〉Hakobune-hen and Keiō Yūgekitai〈2〉Hōgyoku-hen.) and "Grandpa" Nanahikari - Rami's natural grandparents who have brought her up to be the next Key Guardian and belong to the Key Guardian Clan, who have been guarding the Key to the Secret Treasure and Magical Orb for generations. Two years ago, when they came to the realization that they no longer look very good in their bunny suits, they decided to resign their posts to Rami and enjoy their retirement. Voiced by Keiko Yamamoto (Japanese; Grandma), Jōji Yanami (Japanese; Grandpa); Roger L. Jackson (English; both).
- Dr. Pon Eho - A super intelligent tanuki with an IQ of 1400. He is critical of most humans, but on the other hand loves nature and is an ecologist who belongs to Greenpeace. He loves to buy new products that come on the market, but because he has no economical common sense, he is always broke. He always carries the part-time job section of the magazine. Voiced by Jōji Yanami (Japanese); Roger L. Jackson (English).
- Himiko Yamatai - The 13th Queen of Yamatai-koku (called the Pompous Queen of the Ancients in the English version) and Rami's rival, who is in search of the Secret Treasure along with Rami and Dr. Pon. She believes that the Magical Orbs and the treasure, known as Jofuku's Gold, righteously belong to her since it was the 1st Queen Himiko that hid the treasure as an emergency measure for the day when there would be a need to re-establish Yamatai-koku. To destroy the magical seal of the door to the Secret Treasure, she controls the mysterious powered karakuri dolls Tōma and Shima (called Psi-Vee 1 and 2 in the English version). Due to her upbringing in poverty, she can be modest in lifestyle, but she is a queen after all, and her pride remains strong. She has her hair wrapped in a headband and neatly pinned up on both sides. Voiced by Mika Kanai (Japanese); Elaine A. Clarke (English).
- Kappa - Turtle-like humanoid creatures and a type of suijin from Shinto mythology, who are seen inhabiting the backdrops of the game. Rami can use these creatures as a spring to reach higher places. She can also pick them up and move them. One of the Kappas, named Kaiyan, narrates the introductory scene in the game's promotional video. Voiced by Akiko Hiramatsu (Japanese; Kaiyan).
- Tanuki - Subordinates who work under Dr. Pon's direct orders. They appear throughout the game trying to intercept Rami's advancement. Voiced by Keiji Fujiwara (Japanese; Fire Tanuki, Fishing Tanuki, Castle Promenade Tanuki); Roger L. Jackson (English; Fire Raccoons, Fishing Raccoons, Castle Promenade Raccoon).
- Armed Tanuki - Rami can snatch the weapons from their hands and add them to her arsenal. Voiced by Nobuo Tobita (Japanese; Umbrella Tanuki); Roger L. Jackson (English; Umbrella Raccoon).
- Crane in Hanging Bag - Because he hates the cold weather, this bird lives in a bag made of leaves that hangs from a tree. He occasionally scares those who pass underneath.
- Nezumi Kozō Tanukichi - A thief who steals money from the rich to give to the poor. By defeating him when he holds a senryō box in his hand, Rami will obtain the box filled with money.
- Mini-Whaling Boat - A high-performance 2-person whaling boat capable of catching the largest type of whale. The harpoon gun which shoots from the head of the boat is extremely powerful.
- Mr. Piggy - Dr. Pon's marine reserve, who usually works as a houseboat captain.
- Musashi Sakaimari - The Ryōgoku Kokugikan's Daruma doll mascot, possessed by the spirit of the legendary sumo champion Raiden Tameemon. His muscular power has no rival. He always dreamed of setting foot in the wrestling arena, but was never given the chance due to his "lack of human spirit". Dr. Pon got him to be a subordinate by promising him the chance to become a genuine wrestler one day. Voiced by Dai Sasahara (Japanese; speaking), Tsukasa Tawada (Japanese; burping and vomiting); Roger L. Jackson (English).
- Tekkannon (+150 ml) - An armed chahakobi ningyō machine and an improved version of Tekkannon from the first game, built and operated by Dr. Pon. If it takes too much damage, it will become angry and transform into a super chahakobi ningyō. It can carry 360 liters of tea (for about 2,000 people) at a time, so it receives many inquiries, mainly from the employees of cafeterias owned by large companies. Tekkannon is called the Toxic Waste Disposer in the English version of the game. Voiced by Wataru Takagi (Japanese); Toby Gleason (English).
- Frog Tanuki - Tanuki who swim in the Aquarium at the amusement park Azuchi Jidaimura ("Azuchi Historic Village"), wearing red G-strings with a long tail to protect themselves from sharks.
- Kurobei the Octopus - An octopus in the Aquarium, who waves his tentacles around to attack Rami. Voiced by Keiji Fujiwara (Japanese); Don Robins (English).
- Menreiki - A yōkai composed of three Noh masks (Hannya, Otafuku and Hyottoko), and a type of tsukumogami. He earns money by working part-time at the Haunted House at Azuchi Jidaimura in order to go to Easter Island and see the Moai statues. The masks are named the Three Funny Faces in the English version of the game. Voiced by Dai Sasahara (Japanese; Hannya), Keiko Yamamoto (Japanese; Otafuku), Keiji Fujiwara (Japanese; Hyottoko); Elaine A. Clark (English; Hannya, Otafuku), Roger L. Jackson (English; Hyottoko).
- Ninjas - Martial arts fighters who appear in Azuchi Castle, trying to attack Rami with shurikens and metal balls and transforming into Hōgyū Jizō statues. Voiced by Keiji Fujiwara (Japanese); Roger L. Jackson (English).
- Karakuri Nobunaga and Hiyo-chan - A karakuri version of Oda Nobunaga and the boss and his pet rooster of Azuchi Castle. The castle was originally the main attraction of Azuchi Jidaimura, which started construction during the bubble era. Construction was assumed to have been stopped due to the Momoyama Company going bankrupt in the aftermath of the "Ark Catastrophe" a year ago, but it was completed before anyone knew it. Karakuri Nobunanga and Hiyo-chan are called Mech-Shogun and Birdie in the English version of the game. Voiced by Nobuo Tobita (Japanese; Nobunanga); Don Robins (English; Mech-Shogun).
- King UFO - A race hailing from an unknown space region that humans have not yet discovered, with the highest amount of hormone secretion in the universe.
- Nipper - Victor's dog mascot. He makes a cameo appearance in the Outer Space stage as a Soviet space dog used to test the crewed spacecraft Sputnik No. 2.
- 3-meter Alien - A Flatwoods monster with a bomb-shaped rocket launcher with human legs and huge mace-hands, first sighted in the small town of Flatwoods in West Virginia in 1952. In Japan, it is nicknamed the "3-meter alien" and has become so popular that even garage kits based on it are being sold (in some quarters). Voiced by Keiji Fujiwara (Japanese); Elaine A. Clark (English).
- Yoshiko Oroshiya - A news anchor who interviews participants of the Martial Arts Tournament. Her gentle smile brings to mind the "personification of an idealized Japanese woman" (Yamato nadeshiko). She was formerly a sheltered girl from a wealthy family in Sangenjaya with dreams of becoming a star. Due to this, she is shown to be nervous at times during interviews. Voiced by Kae Araki (Japanese); Elaine A. Clark (English).
- Benkei Musashibō - A campy kabuki fighter and a participant of the Martial Arts Tournament. Voiced by Keiji Fujiwara (Japanese); Toby Gleason (English).
- Missionary Xavier - A God-fearing Christian Hakata missionary and evangelist and a participant of the Martial Arts Tournament. He is called Cardinal Xavier in the English version of the game. Voiced by Keiji Fujiwara (Japanese); Don Robins (English).
- Daidarabotchi - A giant, mechanical demon and mythical beast that resides in Mount Fuji. Its legendary feats include creating Mount Fuji in one night, washing its feet in the Tone River while sitting on Mount Haruna, and making huge lakes with its footprints. Depending on the area, it has various other names such as Daidarahō Ōhito and Yagorō Misogorō. Daidarabotchi eats Rami when she enters Mount Fuji, after which she has to make her way out of the beast's stomach (a tower with little elves living in it) and fight its heart, which spits out various Japanese words that Rami can use as platforms. After Daidarabotchi's heart is defeated, it turns out to be a transformed cat. Daidarabotchi is called Apocalypse in the English version of the game. Voiced by Keiji Fujiwara (Japanese; Daidarabotchi), Hikiko Takemasa (Japanese; Cat); Toby Gleason (English; Cat).

== Development ==
After Keio Flying Squadron was released to critical acclaim, the developers at Victor Entertainment started talking about developing a sequel. Production on the game began in 1994 with the title Keiō Yūgekitai 2, with director Yasushi Endo, game designer Satoru Honda, programmer Teruhito Yamaki and composer Tsukasa Tawada getting the ideas together. 3D video games were popular at the time, but the developers chose to stick to 2D, initially developing the game for the Sega CD. This was due to them having little experience in 3D game design and considering the idea of turning anime characters into polygon models terrible. Six months later, the developers heard of Sega's plans to release the Saturn in November, so they changed course. However, they did not know the console's technical specifications, and could not really use the development equipment even when it arrived. They were so focused on learning how to make games on the Saturn that they could barely think about doing 3D polygon graphics. Over time the Saturn and PlayStation began focusing primarily on 3D polygon graphics, which angered them. They decided that they would never use the Saturn's capabilities.

The game was going to be a graphically enhanced version of the first game, but was made into its own game with a different story. The developers felt that because the previous game was a shooter, it did not allow time to look closely at the characters onscreen, making it difficult to bring out their charm, with Rami Nanahikari being the only exception. Because of this, the game was changed into an action platformer to allow for larger sprites. The game's art and graphics were done by Naomasa Kitatani, Kenji Kawashima, Yoshiyuki Ozaki, Nobuyuki Ikigame, Daisuke Fukuda, Akito Kuroda and Masaru Yokōra, while the character designs were done by Hiromasa Ota. The characters originally had sprites that were more in line with their anime designs, and Rami would have also carried a Frog Hammer. The game was planned to have different features, including video backgrounds, 3D bonus stages, and real photographs for most of the items that the player would pick up. The specifications for the Saturn had changed a lot at the time, so the developers spent time testing the console's capabilities. Keio Flying Squadron 2 was Victor's next big project, although they were also developing a couple of other Sega Saturn games: Metal Fighter Miku and a port of 4D Sports Boxing (later Center Ring Boxing). The game was considered for release in February 1995. However, development continued past that month. The game was later renamed Keiō Yūgekitai: Katsugeki-hen, and the video backgrounds, 3D bonus stages and photographed items were cut. The characters' sprites had to be redrawn in 2.5D due to limiting the range of movement and making parts of the platformer stages almost unusable. The game would make use of sprite scaling, squashing and rotation, digital photography, transparency, shading and 3D elements.

The enemies in the first game originally exploded when defeated; this was changed in the sequel to them flying away only in the platformer stages. The Sumida River stage was originally going to be a platformer stage, but was changed to a shooter stage when Endo had issues implementing Kusatsu, the Arrow of Hope. Due to this, the bow and arrow set has stationary locations throughout the stage and cannot be obtained. An "extra mode" and score display were added late in development before the game was finalized. The bonus stages were originally planned as a series of minigames based on Japanese fairy tales, such as Urashima Tarō and Momotarō, but the idea was dropped due to time constraints. Sasuke Sarutobi, a ninja monkey, was planned to appear as an enemy in the game, but was cut. The Martial Arts Tournament was planned to have seven participants, but five of them ended up being scrapped, with only Benkei Musashibō and Missionary Xavier making the final cut. They include:

- Kojirō Sasaki - A handsome young swordsman who wields his 3 1/2-inch long sword Bizen Nagamitsu, though he usually carries a drying pole on his back instead. He was also to have a penguin-like swallow as his subordinate.
- Kurama-Tengu - An old man whose true identity is the Great Tengu of Mount Kurama, prohibited from television broadcasting. He rides (or rather, wears) a horse named Pakaran-kun.
- Hanzō Hattori - The leader of the Iga Shinobu-gun. He was given his name apparently due to being half-yin and yang. He never takes off his shinobi shōzoku in order to hide his appearance.
- Shishido Baiken - A Kusarigama master. On his head is a perch carved from a plum tree. He puffs his back instead of his cheeks when blowing purple smoke.
- Goemon Ishikawa and Oyabun Gama - A cleanliness-loving outlaw and his fire-breathing toad. Goemon spends 16 hours a day in the bath and the remaining eight hours sleeping. Therefore, all transportation is dependent on Gama.

In contrast to the first game's fast-paced score, Keio Flying Squadron 2's soundtrack had a "relaxed"-sounding tone. Tawada wanted each stage to have their own different music, with the platformer stages having patterns that ranged from sounding Sonic the Hedgehog-esque to Disney-esque. The musical instruments, which included koto, shamisen, percussion instruments and drums, were recorded using the Yamaha SY99.

The game features animated cutscenes produced by Studio Pierrot, who also produced the cutscenes in the first game. The Japanese voices were recorded and directed by Susumu Aketagawa at Magic Capsule and Avaco Creative Studio. Rami was the only character in the first game with spoken dialogue during gameplay, but this time the enemies and bosses also had dialogue. In response to overwhelming requests, Miho Kanno, who was appearing in advertisements for the Victor V-Saturn and releasing singles under Victor's music label at the time, reprised her role as Rami, reuniting with Jōji Yanami and Keiko Yamamoto, who reprised their roles as Dr. Pon and Grandma, respectively. Kanno stated that upon hearing about the game, she felt a sense of parental affection because Rami was popular and loved by everyone at the time, considering her a character close to her hometown of Saitama Prefecture. Producer Toshiyuki Nagai took care to create an atmosphere in the recording booth so that she could enjoy her sessions. Yanami also replaced Yusaku Yara as the voice of Grandpa. Mika Kanai provided the voice of Himiko and replaced Akiko Hiramatsu as the voice of Spot. Additional voices were provided by Yamamoto, Kae Araki, Keiji Fujiwara, Nobuo Tobita, Wataru Takagi, Dai Sasahara and Hikiko Takemasa. For the boss characters, Tawada used a sample of his own burp from a sound effects library for Musashi Sakaimari, and created Daidarabotchi's (the game's final boss) voice and sound effects by recording Fujiwara's voice and applying various effects to it, such as pitch-shifting it down. A lot of the voice clips were recorded on Digital Audio Tape, with Tawada using about three-fifths of the samples. At one point he recorded the 3-meter Alien's voice at the wrong sampling rate, resulting in it being sped up when imported into the game. Subtitles were added for players to understand the Alien's dialogue. Tawada planned to use the Saturn's built-in sound engine for everything, including the music, but the voice clips took up a lot of memory space on the disc, so he decided to use Compact Disc Digital Audio instead. The English translation and voice recording was done at Watanabe-Robins & Associates and Music Annex, with the voices provided by Samantha Paris, Roger L. Jackson, Elaine A. Clark, Toby Gleason and Don Robins. Clark performed several different characters in the game, including Himiko, Hannya, Otafuku, the 3-meter Alien and Yoshiko Oroshiya.

As part of a marketing campaign for the game, fans could apply to win goodies (including a colored paper with an autograph signed by Miho Kanno, cels used in the game's cutscenes, a 30-minute promotional video, and a telephone card) by answering a questionnaire postcard and entering their gift's number before May 31, June 30, July 31, or August 31, 1996. Others could apply to win goodies (including a copy of the game's script signed by Kanno, a voice actor message board, a stamp poster set and a sweatshirt) by entering the number and attaching an application form before November 27, 1996. Merchandise such as T-shirts and sweatshirts with Rami's face was also being planned by JVC at the time.

The game contains a debug mode, which can be accessed by entering a cheat code on the start/options screen.

== Release ==
Keio Flying Squadron 2 was released for the Sega Saturn in Japan on May 17, 1996, and in Europe and Australia in September later that year. (Note: Attributed to multiple references:) It was originally set for release in March of that year, and was considered for a North American release.

Keiō Yūgekitai: Okiraku Tamatebako (慶応遊撃隊お気楽玉手箱, Keio Flying Squadron: Carefree Jewel Box) was a "not for resale" Sega Saturn disc only available in Japan in 1996. The disc contains higher quality versions of both the opening and ending FMV cutscenes of the first game, two cutscenes related to the second game, demo levels from the second game, a sound test including voice clips for Rami, Spot, Dr. Pon and Himiko, a showcase of the aforementioned scrapped Martial Arts Tournament participants, and an art gallery available both in-game and separately, being accessible on the CD via a personal computer.

=== Manga ===
Prior to the game's Japanese release, Keiō Yūgekitai: Chichibu Gakuen-hen (慶応遊撃隊秩父学園編, Keio Flying Squadron: Chichibu School Edition) was serialized in the magazine Virtual Idol Re☆Co☆Mix in volumes 2-5, running between January 8, 1996 and May 5, 1997. The manga was written by Tatsuya Mitamori. Set after the first two games, it follows Rami's adventures during her time at junior high school.

=== Novel ===
On July 27, 1996, Victor Novels published Keiō Yūgekitai〈2〉Hōgyoku-hen (慶応遊撃隊〈2〉宝玉編, Keio Flying Squadron Volume 2: Jewel Edition), written by Tokuji Komine. The book adapts and expands the plot of the game, with the addition of a new character; Tokai Niimi, the son of gaikoku bugyō Masaoki Niimi and a master of Western magic who joins the race for the Secret Treasure. The scrapped Martial Arts Tournament participants and Sasuke Sarutobi appear in the book as clones created by Dr. Pon.

== Reception ==
Reception

Review scores
Publication	Score
Famitsu	6/10, 6/10, 7/10, 6/10
GameFan	85/100, 90/100, 92/100
GamesMaster	73%
Joypad	4/5
M! Games	76%
Mean Machines Sega	75/100
Mega Fun	65%
Player One	82%
Video Games (DE)	58%
CD Consoles	2/5
Fun Generation	7/10
Mega Force	82%
Power Unlimited	8/10
Saturn+	84%
Sega Power	80%
Sega Saturn Magazine	78%
Sega Saturn Magazine (JP)	5.66/10
Total Saturn	92%
Ultra Player	4/6

Upon release, Keio Flying Squadron 2 was met with average critical sentiments.

Ryan Lockhart, Dave Halverson and Casey Loe of GameFan praised the game for its graphics and music, with Halverson stating, "Few will play Keio Flying Squadron 2, as only the craziest gamers search out and buy import games." Sega Saturn Magazine's Sam Hickman felt that the game had very generic and overly easy gameplay, but was still somewhat fun to play, largely due to the intriguingly strange graphics. However, she concluded that most people would not find it worth the retail price. Total Saturn called it a "playable, refreshing game after the mayhem of Nights into Dreams". Marcus of Mean Machines stated, "Quality platform games are difficult to come across these days and, while the difficulty is level here is obviously pitched towards younger players, there's enough trickery and Japanese kitsch to keep older ones amused." GamesMaster's Alex Cox deemed it "a good, solid, mental platformer that'll give you a laugh if nothing else". Ryan Butt of Saturn+ admitted that it was mostly a platformer, likening the ability to pick up and throw objects to Astal. However, he praised the game for its "cunning puzzles and sick, deranged humour factory that make playing through to the end compulsory". Lucy Longhurst of Cybernet said that the game would "keep any platform-loving gamer going for quite a while", adding that it "should have an even wider appeal with its cute characters, fast action and funky gameplay". In 1998, Saturn Power rated the game 88th on their Top 100 Sega Saturn Games, summarizing, "A bizarre Japanese platform game that, somehow, manages to impress all that come into contact with it. The graphics are fairly primitive, but the gameplay's excellent."

In 2000, the game received a 7.7413/10 score in a reader survey conducted by the Japanese Sega Saturn Magazine, raking among Saturn titles at number 469.
