= Rami-chan no Ōedo Sugoroku: Keiō Yūgekitai Gaiden =

1998 video game

- Developer: Victor Interactive Software
- Publisher: Victor Interactive Software
- Directors: Yasushi Endo; Satoru Honda
- Designer: Teruhito Yamaki
- Artists: Naomasa Kitatani; Nobuyuki Ikigame; Koji Noguchi
- Writer: Satoru Honda
- Composer: Tsukasa Tawada
- Platform: PlayStation
- Release: JP: September 17, 1998
- Genre: Party
- Modes: Single-player, multiplayer

Rami-chan no Ōedo Sugoroku: Keiō Yūgekitai Gaiden (蘭未ちゃんの大江戸すごろく慶応遊撃隊外伝; Rami-chan's Big Edo Sugoroku: A Keio Flying Squadron Sidestory) is a 1998 video game for the PlayStation. Developed by Victor Interactive Software, it is the third and last game in the Keio Flying Squadron series, and was released only in Japan. While the first game is a side-scrolling shoot 'em up and its sequel, Keio Flying Squadron 2, is a platformer with shooter sections, the third game is a party game.

Like the first two games, the third game refers to Japanese culture, both ancient and modern simultaneously.

== Plot ==
After the first two battles with Dr. Pon Eho that did cataclysmic damage to Edo, things are starting to look normal again, and Rami Nanahikari, Pochi and her grandparents go to the beach, following a hot lead on more sacred treasures. Rami and Pochi swim off the beaten path to an abandoned shrine. After blowing up the ground and reaching the disclosed location, they reach a door with a powerful seal that they can't open. Just when they think that they are empty-handed, Pochi finds a ring with the same seal as the one on the locked door, which turns out to be one of King Solomon's Treasures, with the rest hidden somewhere around Japan. Rami now travels around Japan to go through all the leads on the rest of Solomon's Treasures, with Dr. Pon tracking her every move.

== Gameplay ==
Rami-chan no Ōedo Sugoroku: Keiō Yūgekitai Gaiden is a party video game featuring eight playable characters and two secret characters: Rami Nanahikari, Pochi Nanahikari, Himiko Yamatai, a King UFO, and newcomers Tekkannon Dash, Kaeru-hime, Oyabun Saru, Airin, Daizō Hino and Yao Bikuni. The gameplay is similar to Monopoly: players roll a die to advance around a board, purchase property that they land on and earn money when opponents land on the player's property. The goal of the game is to raise more ryō than everyone else and build and buy food stalls for different festivals. Every stall and zone that the player owns counts as capital to help them win at the game's end, even if they do not have it in play. Expensive stalls that have been upgraded repeatedly will net the player massive points over really cheap stalls in play, so they must have as many valuable properties on the board as they can. The course of time is indicated by "Year" and "Month". Beginning from April, the order is each turn is one month elapsed. In January, it changes to the next year. In March, there are annual property taxes and year-end financial results. Each season doubles the value of food stalls in each of the four quadrants. Rami-chan no Ōedo Sugoroku includes multiplayer compatibility for up to four players with the use of the PlayStation Multitap.

Minigames are held at special street stalls. A cash award is paid to the winner of a minigame. There are 4 minigames in this game:

- Toge Jizō - This memory game requires 2 players: the player who lands on the square and the designated player.
- Sumo Tournament - The player wins by pushing the other players from the arena with body blow attacks. If the match drags on, the arena will shrink.
- Lottery - This requires participation of all players. Players have to guess the location of Kaiyan the Kappa, hidden somewhere in one of 16 boxes.
- Chū Race - This requires participation of all players. Among five mice, players predict the combination they think will come in 1st and 2nd place.

== Characters ==
- Rami Nanahikari - The grandchild of an ancient family and a descendant of aliens who came to Earth long ago. She currently thinks of doing some business with the gold she received from her last adventure. Voiced by Miki Nagasawa.
- Pochi Nanahikari - The Nanahikari family's pet dragon. He is best friends with Rami, and completely recovers from injuries and diseases, now appearing full of energy. Voiced by Etsuko Kozakura.
- "Grandma" and "Grandpa" Nanahikari - Rami's grandparents and members of the Key Guardian Clan, who have been guarding the Key to the Secret Treasure and Magical Orb for generations. Voiced by Keiko Yamamoto (Grandma).
- Himiko Yamatai - The 13th Queen of Yamatai-koku. She is always planning a method of raising funds for the restoration of Yamatai-koku, but the day of achieving her ambition is still far away. Voiced by Mika Kanai.
- Dr. Pon Eho - A super intelligent tanuki who regularly perpetrates malicious crimes, but has taken up ecology as a hobby and loves nature. Voiced by Jōji Yanami.
- Benten - One of the Seven Lucky Gods from the first game. She appears in the game's opening cutscene, informing Dr. Pon of the location of King Solomon's Treasure and Rami's movements being marked. Voiced by Misa Watanabe.
- Kaiyan the Kappa - A turtle-like humanoid creature. He plays a minor role in the game, appearing in its tutorial and the "Lottery" minigame, and running his own shop. Voiced by Kurumi Mamiya.
- Yoshiko Oroshiya - A girl who takes on the temporary form of an idol announcer in public, and the host of the game. Voiced by Kae Araki.
- King UFO - A race hailing from an unknown space region that humans have not yet discovered. He has the highest amount of hormone secretion in the universe. He earns money by running a food stall in order to conquer Earth. Voiced by Kōji Ishii.
- Tekkannon Dash - A general-purpose transport machine created by Dr. Pon, manufactured in the first year of the Man'en era and equipped with the artificial intelligence "Pon-chan ver1.33". Voiced by Tomohisa Asō.
- Kaeru-hime - The second princess of the Kēroggu Kingdom, a small country in Europe. She is under a spell cast by a witch as a frog. Her real name is Strona Covers. Voiced by Kurumi Mamiya.
- Oyabun Saru - A lustful monkey and an onmistu from the Minami Machi-bugyō. Voiced by Tomokazu Seki.
- Airin - A young oni who has been living near Kawachi. She goes all the way to Edo in search of a marriage partner. Voiced by Kumiko Watanabe.
- Daizō Hino - The construction supervisor of the new Edo Castle, and a citizen of Edo. Voiced by Dai Sasahara.
- Yao Bikuni - A legendary nun with perpetual youth who has lived for 800 years. Voiced by Kurumi Mamiya.
- Narrator - Voiced by Yusaku Yara.

== Development ==
Rami-chan no Ōedo Sugoroku: Keiō Yūgekitai Gaiden was directed and written by Yasushi Endo and Satoru Honda, executive produced by Kazumasa Harada, and programmed by Teruhito Yamaki, with art and graphics by Naomasa Kitatani, Nobuyuki Ikigame and Koji Noguchi, character designs by Hiromasa Ota, and soundtrack composed by Tsukasa Tawada. Developed between 1996 and 1998 and initially considered to be made as a role-playing game or puzzle game, the game was made on a low budget with a choppy framerate and 3D graphics.

The game features animated cutscenes produced by Studio Pierrot, who also produced the cutscenes in the first two games. The voices were recorded and directed by Jin Aketagawa at Magic Capsule. Miki Nagasawa and Etsuko Kozakura replaced Miho Kanno and Mika Kanai as the voices of Rami Nanahikari and Pochi Nanahikari, respectively, though Kanai reprised her role as Himiko Yamatai, as did Jōji Yanami as Dr. Pon, Keiko Yamamoto as Grandma, Yusaku Yara as the narrator, and Kae Araki as Yoshiko Oroshiya. Additional voices were provided by Nagasawa, Araki, Tomohisa Asō, Kōji Ishii, Kumiko Watanabe, Kurumi Mamiya, Tomokazu Seki, Dai Sasahara and Misa Watanabe.

== Release ==
Rami-chan no Ōedo Sugoroku: Keiō Yūgekitai Gaiden was released on September 17, 1998. Upon its release, the game received mixed-to-negative reviews for its poor graphics, gameplay, and mechanics, and the absence of Miho Kanno. Its genre, release on the PlayStation and expensive price also unintentionally led to the first two games receiving negative reviews at the time for their different genres, releases on the Sega CD and Sega Saturn and prices.

On August 7, 2023, Tsukasa Tawada stated that he personally thought at the time that it would have been nice if the series had a fourth installment, a role-playing game. In February 2024, Samantha Paris, Rami's voice actress in the English versions of the first two games, stated that she was not aware of the game.
