= Wacky World of Sports =

2009 video game

- European cover art
- Developer: Tabot
- Publisher: Sega
- Director: Kenji Murayama
- Producer: Osamu Ohashi
- Artists: Daisuke Nakayama; Tsutomu Kitazawa
- Composer: Tsukasa Tawada
- Platform: Wii
- Release: AU: September 17, 2009; EU: September 18, 2009; NA: September 22, 2009; JP: October 29, 2009
- Genres: Sports, minigames
- Modes: Single-player, multiplayer

Wacky World of Sports, known in Japan as Chin Sports (珍スポーツ, Chin Supōtsu), is a video game by Sega for the Wii console. It consists of minigames involving non-conventional sports like tuna tossing, lumberjack sports, cheese wheel rolling, and other fanciful and fictional activities.
