= Moon Crystal =

1992 video game

- Developer: Hect
- Publisher: Hect
- Programmer: Tomonari Matsumoto
- Composer: Tsukasa Tawada
- Platform: Family Computer
- Release: JP: August 28, 1992
- Genres: Action, platformer
- Mode: Single-player

Moon Crystal (Note: Japanese: ムーンクリスタル) is a 1992 video game for the Family Computer. It is a side scrolling action game, published and developed by Hect. It was well received by critics, who praised the smooth animations and graphics, however it sold poorly. It has never been released outside of Japan.

== Gameplay ==
Ricky is on the left side of the screen, enemy is on the right side.

Moon Crystal is a side scrolling 2D action game. Players take the role as Ricky, a green haired boy who is controlled during action sequences. A second character, a blonde girl Rosina, appears in the game's story cut-scenes but does not appear during gameplay.

The gameplay plays some similarities to Zelda II, while it shares some mechanics from Prince of Persia. It includes the ability to grab onto ledges, which is a rare features for Famicom games.

The game features a wide variety of levels and stages, including a pirate ship, and a clock tower.

== Plot ==
Players must guide Ricky on a quest to rescue his father from the evil necromancer Count Crimson. The rest of Ricky's family has also been kidnapped; prompting him to fight even harder against Crimson's forces.

== Development ==
The game uses Kanji in dialogue, which is rare for games of that era, which typically use katakana.

== Release ==
The game was released in Japan on August 28, 1992 for the Famicom and self-published by Hect. The game got a limited release, and sold few copies due to it being released so late in the Famicom's lifespan. A version published by DTMC for North America was planned. It was shown at the Consumer Electronic Show, and it was previewed by several American gaming magazines. An advertisement for the game even appeared in the June 1992 issues of Electronic Gaming Monthly and GamePro. However, it was cancelled. 1up.com believes the reason it wasn't released was because it came out at a time when the NES was not popular in America and focus had shifted to the Super Nintendo. It has never been released outside of Japan, nor has it been given any re-release on the Virtual Console for the Wii, or other systems.

Since the game was so rare, it became a collector's item, and it has been known to sell as much as 30,000 yen in the used gaming market in Japan.

== Reception ==
Upon release, Japanese gaming publication Weekly Famitsu gave it a score of 24 out of 40, while praising the smoothness of the character animations. 1up.com called it one of many Zelda II clones on the system, but stated the graphics and animation were higher quality than the others which allowed it to stand out. Retro Gamer magazine praised the graphics and animations, saying they were high quality for an 8-bit game, and called it a potential best seller had it been released, while recommending it as a game to import from Japan. Hardcore Gaming 101 called the game "quite great, but not outstanding". Strana Igr praised the graphics, sound, and the game's storyline. The level design was described as varied and the difficulty level was noted as high.
