= JaJaMaru Gekimaden: Maboroshi no Kinmajou =

1990 video game

- JaJaMaru Gekimaden cover art
- Developer: Jaleco
- Publisher: Jaleco
- Composer: Tsukasa Tawada
- Series: Ninja JaJaMaru-kun
- Platform: Family Computer
- Release: JP: May 29, 1990
- Genre: Action RPG
- Mode: Single-player

JaJaMaru Gekimaden: Maboroshi no Kinmajou (じゃじゃ丸撃魔伝 幻の金魔城) is an action role-playing game for the Family Computer. It was released in 1990 by Jaleco to a Japan-exclusive market.

The game is part of the Ninja JaJaMaru-kun series, which had its debut on the Famicom and has had games on several different platforms.

== Gameplay ==
JaJaMaru Gekimaden is an action role-playing game, with gameplay similar to The Legend of Zelda. Players control the protagonist JaJaMaru through towns, dungeons, and a world map. Each different type of map features top-down exploration. When moving through a dungeon, JaJaMaru will gradually recover health. JaJaMaru can equip different types of weapons and items that he can buy or find and use them during combat. Dungeons are made up of several rooms with enemies inside. Occasionally, an enemy will drop money when defeated, which can be used to buy items or heal health points at an inn.

== Reception ==
In his review of the game, Kurt Kalata was negative about JaJaMaru Gekimaden. He complained that the puzzles are too simplistic, the enemies do not drop enough money, and that the music is "grating".

== Ninja JajaMaru: The Legend Of The Golden Castle ==
This game was officially localized in English with the name Ninja JajaMaru: The Legend Of The Golden Castle and released in 2023 for the Nintendo Entertainment System and as part of the game collection Ninja JaJaMaru: The Lost RPGs.
