= Thoroughbred Breeder =

- Cover art of Thoroughbred Breeder: Sekai Seiha-hen, the last game of the series
- Genre: Alternative sports (horse racing)
- Developer: Hect
- Publisher: Hect

Thoroughbred Breeder (サラブレッドブリーダー) is a series of Japan-exclusive horse racing video games developed and published by Hect.

This series of games allows players to simulate the life of a thoroughbred horse breeder and allows players to become very wealthy; if certain conditions are met in the game. Betting in addition to watching are the two modes usually permitted with games in this series.

A part of playing these games also involving feeding the animals, giving them water, buying them at low prices, and selling them when they reach peak prices at the market.

== Games ==
Intro message from the first game of the series.

The following is a list of games released in the series. Three games were released for the Super Famicom while two others were released for the first-generation PlayStation. The music of the games were composed by Tsukasa Tawada.

Japanese Title	English Title	System	Year
サラブレッドブリーダー	Thoroughbred Breeder	Super Famicom	1993
サラブレッドブリーダーII	Thoroughbred Breeder II	Super Famicom	1994
サラブレッドブリーダーII プラス	Thoroughbred Breeder II Plus	PlayStation	1995
サラブレッドブリーダーIII	Thoroughbred Breeder III	Super Famicom	1996
サラブレッドブリーダー 世界制覇編	Thoroughbred Breeder: Sekai Seiha-hen	PlayStation	1998
