= Harvest Moon: Light of Hope =

2017 farming simulation video game

- Developers: Tabot, Inc.
- Publishers: NA: Natsume Inc.; EU/AU: Rising Star Games
- Producers: Taka Maekawa; Masaru Yoshioka; Yoshiaki Iwasawa
- Artists: Sanae Maekawa; Saki Imaizumi
- Composer: Tsukasa Tawada
- Series: Harvest Moon
- Platforms: Microsoft Windows; Nintendo Switch; PlayStation 4; Android; iOS; Xbox One
- Release: Windows November 14, 2017; Nintendo Switch, PS4 May 29, 2018; Android, iOS September 26, 2018; Xbox One September 18, 2020
- Genre: Farm life sim
- Mode: Single-player

Harvest Moon: Light of Hope is a farm simulation role-playing game developed by Tabot, Inc. for multiple platforms. First announced at E3 2017, It was first released for Microsoft Windows on November 14, 2017, with versions for PlayStation 4 and Nintendo Switch following on May 29, 2018. It was later released for iOS and Android on September 26, 2018. A version containing all previously released downloadable content titled Harvest Moon: Light of Hope Complete was released for Windows 10 and Xbox One on September 18, 2020.

== Gameplay ==
The setting is in a harbor town, with the goal of reviving the lighthouse. As in most Harvest Moon games, players can grow crops and raise livestock. They can also opt to get married, have a child, buy animals, and help villagers with requests. In the Special Edition, there is a playable character named Soleil (whose gender varies) who can be controlled by a second player.

== Plot ==
The story begins with the player, Mike or Sabrina, washed onto an island where they are found by a girl named Jeanne, who owns a lighthouse that serves as the life source of the island. The lighthouse has long stopped glowing following a violent storm and many inhabitants have left. She provides them a farm to work in. The player later finds a round stone tablet and meets a Harvest Sprite named Rowan. Showing the tablet to Jeanne, she believes that it might fit in one of the round slots near the lighthouse. After placing the tablet in one of the slots, the lighthouse begins to light up again; it turns out the tablet is one of the keys needed to activate the lighthouse, but the player must seek out the other four tablets to fully revive the lighthouse. During their mission, they are aided by other Harvest Sprites, a wizard named Edmond, the Harvest Goddess, and the Harvest God, and learn that a storm is what caused the tablets to be blown away in the first place. The storm itself was caused by the underworld king Gorgon to discourage his daughter from going up to the surface. Once the lighthouse is revived, the main story ends.

== Reception ==
Reception

Aggregate score
Aggregator	Score
Metacritic	62/100 (NS)

The Nintendo Switch version of Harvest Moon: Light of Hope received "mixed or average reviews" according to Metacritic.
