= Harvest Moon (2014 video game series) =

- The Harvest Moon series logo.
- Genres: Farming simulation Social simulation Cozy game Role-playing game Life simulation
- Developers: Appci Corporation (2014 – 2024) (Note: Formerly known as Tabot, Inc. before 1 June 2018); AJP Games Inc. (2016 – 2018); Daredevil Development (2017); Picola Inc. (2019); Natsume Inc. (2021 – present); Imagica Geeq Inc. (2025 – present)
- Publishers: Natsume Inc. (2014 – present); Rising Star Games (2017 – 2021)
- Platforms: Nintendo 3DS, Nintendo Switch, Android, iOS, Microsoft Windows, PlayStation 4, Xbox One, PlayStation 5, Xbox Series X/S, Nintendo Switch 2
- First release: Harvest Moon: The Lost Valley; 4 November 2014
- Latest release: Harvest Moon: Echoes of Teradea; 15 October 2026

Harvest Moon is a farm life simulation and role-playing video game series published by Natsume. The main objective of the games is to rebuild a run-down old farm and turn it into a successful one.

Previously, Natsume published the series Bokujō Monogatari in North America under the title Harvest Moon. However, the developer, original publisher and owner of this series, Marvelous, decided to have their own American division, Xseed Games, take over North American distribution in 2014. However, due to Natsume keeping the rights to the Harvest Moon name, the latest titles in the series were rebranded Story of Seasons while Natsume began to produce their own series with the name Harvest Moon.

== Origins ==
The name "Harvest Moon" was originally used for the series created by Marvelous known in Japan as Bokujō Monogatari (牧場物語, lit. Ranch Story). Natsume initially distributed this series under the name Harvest Moon outside of Japan until 2014. At that time, Natsume maintained the rights to the Harvest Moon series name after Marvelous announced that it would have its subsidiary, Xseed Games, take over North American distribution. Because of this, Xseed began localizing the series to North America under the Story of Seasons title, beginning with the release of the game of the same name.

Natsume, who retained the rights to the Harvest Moon trademark, began releasing its own games under that title. The resulting spin-off series has caused some degree of confusion among fans and video game news sources.

== List of games ==
Game	Details
Harvest Moon: The Lost Valley Original release date(s): NA: 4 November 2014; EU: 19 June 2015; AU: 20 June 2015	Release years by system: 2014 – Nintendo 3DS; 2025 – Nintendo Switch; 2026 – Android, iOS
Harvest Moon: The Lost Valley Original release date(s): NA: 4 November 2014; EU: 19 June 2015; AU: 20 June 2015	Notes: The first non-spin-off released without involving the developers of Story of Seasons.; Developed by Appci Corporation (as Tabot, Inc.); Published by Natsume Inc.
Harvest Moon: Seeds of Memories Original release date(s): WW: 14 January 2016	Release years by system: 2016 – iOS, Android
Harvest Moon: Seeds of Memories Original release date(s): WW: 14 January 2016	Notes: Developed by Appci Corporation (as Tabot, Inc.); Published by Natsume Inc.
Harvest Moon: Skytree Village Original release date(s): NA: 8 November 2016; EU: 2 June 2017; AU: 30 May 2017	Release years by system: 2016 – Nintendo 3DS; 2025 – Nintendo Switch; 2026 – Android, iOS
Harvest Moon: Skytree Village Original release date(s): NA: 8 November 2016; EU: 2 June 2017; AU: 30 May 2017	Notes: Developed by Appci Corporation (as Tabot, Inc.), AJP Games Inc.; Published by Natsume Inc., Rising Star Games (Limited Edition)
Harvest Moon: Lil' Farmers Original release date(s): WW: 25 May 2017	Release years by system: 2017 – Android, iOS
Harvest Moon: Lil' Farmers Original release date(s): WW: 25 May 2017	Notes: Developed by Daredevil Development; Published by Natsume Inc., Rising Star Games
Harvest Moon: Light of Hope Original release date(s): WW: 15 November 2017	Release years by system: 2017 – Microsoft Windows; 2018 – Nintendo Switch, PlayStation 4, iOS, Android
Harvest Moon: Light of Hope Original release date(s): WW: 15 November 2017	Notes: Developed by Appci Corporation (as Tabot, Inc.), AJP Games Inc.; Published by Natsume Inc., Rising Star Games
Harvest Moon: Mad Dash Original release date(s): WW: 29 October 2019	Release years by system: 2019 – Nintendo Switch, PlayStation 4, Microsoft Windows; 2020 – Xbox One
Harvest Moon: Mad Dash Original release date(s): WW: 29 October 2019	Notes: Spin-off title with puzzle game elements; Developed by Appci Corporation, Picola Inc. (Nintendo Switch); Published by Natsume Inc., Rising Star Games (Nintendo Switch, PlayStation 4)
Harvest Moon: One World Original release date(s): NA: 2 March 2021; EU: 5 March 2021	Release years by system: 2021 – Nintendo Switch, PlayStation 4, Microsoft Windows, Xbox One
Harvest Moon: One World Original release date(s): NA: 2 March 2021; EU: 5 March 2021	Notes: Developed by Appci Corporation, Natsume Inc. (Microsoft Windows); Published by Natsume Inc., Rising Star Games (Nintendo Switch)
Harvest Moon: The Winds of Anthos Original release date(s): NA: 26 September 2023; EU: 6 October 2023	Release years by system: 2023 – Nintendo Switch, PlayStation 4, PlayStation 5, Xbox Series X/S, Xbox One, Microsoft Windows
Harvest Moon: The Winds of Anthos Original release date(s): NA: 26 September 2023; EU: 6 October 2023	Notes: Developed by Appci Corporation, Natsume Inc.; Published by Natsume Inc.
Harvest Moon: Home Sweet Home Original release date(s): WW: 23 August 2024	Release years by system: 2024 – Android, iOS; 2025 – Nintendo Switch, PlayStation 5, Xbox Series X/S, Microsoft Windows
Harvest Moon: Home Sweet Home Original release date(s): WW: 23 August 2024	Notes: Developed by Appci Corporation (2024), Imagica Geeq Inc. (2025), Natsume Inc. (2025); Published by Natsume Inc.
Harvest Moon: Echoes of Teradea Original release date(s): WW: 15th October 2026	Release years by system: 15th October 2026 – Nintendo Switch, Nintendo Switch 2, PlayStation 5, Xbox Series X/S, Microsoft Windows
Harvest Moon: Echoes of Teradea Original release date(s): WW: 15th October 2026	Notes: Developed by Imagica Geeq Inc., Natsume Inc.; Published by Natsume Inc.

== Reception ==
Aggregate review scores
Game	Year	Metacritic
Harvest Moon: The Lost Valley	2014	3DS: 46
Harvest Moon: Seeds of Memories	2016	iOS: 68
Harvest Moon: Skytree Village	2016	3DS: 59
Harvest Moon: Lil' Farmers	2017	iOS: 70
Harvest Moon: Light of Hope	2018	NS: 62; PS4: 63
Harvest Moon: Mad Dash	2019	NS: 29; PS4: 50; XONE: 50
Harvest Moon: One World	2021	NS: 54
Harvest Moon: The Winds of Anthos	2023	NS: 72; PS5: 80; XBX: 85
Harvest Moon: Home Sweet Home	2024	iOS: 70; NS: 35; PS5: 56
Harvest Moon: Echoes of Teradea	2026	NS2: 73; NS: 52

Handheld and home console titles in the series have received mostly mixed to poor reviews from critics. Titles on iOS and Android have generally received more favorable reviews. Harvest Moon: The Winds of Anthos and Harvest Moon: Echoes of Teradea have so far received the most positive treatment from critics.
