= Keio Flying Squadron =

1993 video game

- European cover art
- Developer: Victor Entertainment
- Publisher: JVC Musical Industries
- Director: Yasushi Endo
- Designer: Satoru Honda
- Programmer: Teruhito Yamaki
- Artists: Hiroshi Ogawa; Hitoshi Kakumu
- Composer: Tsukasa Tawada
- Platform: Sega CD
- Release: JP: August 6, 1993; EU: December 1994; NA: February 4, 1995
- Genre: Scrolling shooter
- Mode: Single-player

Keio Flying Squadron (Note: Keio Flying Squadron (Japanese: 慶応遊撃隊, Hepburn: Keiō Yūgekitai; lit. 'Keio Flying Squadron')) is a scrolling shooter video game developed and published by Victor Entertainment for the Sega CD. It was first released in Japan in 1993, followed by Europe in 1994, and North America in 1995. Players control Rami Nanahikari, who rides atop a dragon and battles numerous enemies in search of the key to a secret treasure.

Development was led by director Yasushi Endo and designer Satoru Honda. The team took inspiration from classic Japanese folktales and modern popular culture to create a comedic aesthetic that they believed would have wide appeal. It features music composed by Tsukasa Tawada, and animated cutscenes produced by Studio Pierrot.

Keio Flying Squadron received average reviews, with praise for its graphics and gameplay, but was commercially unsuccessful. It has since attained a cult following and has been recognized as one of the best games for the Sega CD. It was followed by Keio Flying Squadron 2 (1996) for the Sega Saturn, and Rami-chan no Ōedo Sugoroku: Keiō Yūgekitai Gaiden (1998) for the PlayStation.

== Plot ==
The game is set in the Keiō era (1865–1868) of Japanese history, during the Tokugawa shogunate. Rami Nanahikari, a naughty girl in her prime, has been raised from a young age and brought up by her grandparents to be the next Guardian of the Key to the Secret Treasure, known as "Ark", and is really a descendant of aliens who came to Earth in ancient times. She does not know the importance of the Treasure, and her overbearing grandmother does not remember what secret the Key unlocks. The Key was stolen while Rami was at the local convenience store, and now she must get the Key back.

Wearing her bunny girl costume, Rami rides into battle on her trusty dragon, Spot, as she encounters various enemies such as tanuki, dogs, cats, monkeys, the Seven Lucky Gods, the U.S. military forces, the Russian Army, and a serpentine dragon, until she arrives at the ship of Dr. Pon Eho, a tanuki billed as the most intelligent creature on Earth with an IQ of 1400, his appearance being appropriate for the thief that he is.

== Gameplay ==
The game consists of Rami riding on top of Spot, who can shoot fireballs at enemies. By earning "Power-Up Items", the player increases the power of the flames to six different levels. The player can also pick up Sub-Weapons and use either the Ground Bombs, the Explosive Throwing Stars or Homing Spot Jrs. (companion fighters) depending on the type of Sub-Weapon Items available. Normally, Spot Jrs. are for covering Spot; however by pressing the "C" Button, they become powerful bullets projected forward. If surrounded by the enemy, the player can use the Kamikaze Attack, sacrificing the Spot Jrs. to do larger damage, only for them to reappear when Spot ceases to shoot.

== Characters ==
Japanese names are given in the Western order, given name first.

- Rami Nanahikari - An alien descendant of Noah and the grandchild of an ancient family with the mission of guarding the Key to the Secret Treasure. Rami wears a traditional kimono at the beginning of the game, and later changes into her bunny suit, the formal attire of a Key Guardian. Voiced by Miho Kanno (Japanese); Samantha Paris (English).
- Spot Nanahikari - A dragon who has been serving the Key Guardian Clan and the Nanahikari family as a pet for many generations. Although a bit weak-minded and lazy, he is reliable and always loyal to his owner Rami, having no problems with flying and shooting fireballs. He is called Pochi in the Japanese release of the game. Voiced by Akiko Hiramatsu (Japanese); Samantha Paris (English).
- "Grandma" (Note: "Grandma Shima" in Keiō Yūgekitai〈1〉Hakobune-hen and Keiō Yūgekitai〈2〉Hōgyoku-hen.) and "Grandpa" Nanahikari - Rami's biological grandparents who have raised her from a young age and brought her up to be the next Key Guardian. They were former Guardians themselves, continuing a long line of ancestors in the Key Guardian Clan that have kept the Treasure safe for many generations. Though they know their duty, they no longer remember the meaning of the Key. Voiced by Keiko Yamamoto (Japanese; Grandma), Yusaku Yara (Japanese; Grandpa); Roger L. Jackson (English; both).
- Dr. Pon Eho - A super intelligent tanuki who stole the Key to the Secret Treasure and knows of its significance. His IQ is 1400. He is accompanied by his pet cat, (Note: "Poko" in Keiō Yūgekitai〈1〉Hakobune-hen and Keiō Yūgekitai〈2〉Hōgyoku-hen.) whom he found abandoned on the roadside. In the Japanese version, he has a speech quirk where he ends most of his sentences with "~tsupe" (～っぺ). This is not present in the English versions. Voiced by Jōji Yanami (Japanese); Roger L. Jackson (English).
- Seven Lucky Gods - Obedient servants of Dr. Pon, consisting of Fukurokuju, Ebisu, Bishamon, Shōjō, Hotei, Benten and Daikoku.
- Narrator - Voiced by Yusaku Yara (Japanese); Roger L. Jackson (English).

== Development ==
Keio Flying Squadron was made by a small team of developers; director Yasushi Endo, game designer Satoru Honda, programmer Teruhito Yamaki, and composer Tsukasa Tawada, with art and graphics by Hiroshi Ogawa and Hitoshi Kakumu, and character designs by Hiromasa Ota and Takeshi Honda. Since Victor Entertainment was originally a music company before its merge with Nihon AVC, they had been developing products that brought out the potential of CD-ROMs. Most of their previous video games were overseas ports of other games; following the release of the SNES version of Dungeon Master, the developers all came together to create their first original game.

According to Honda, the developers wanted a story inspired by Kachi-kachi Yama, a Japanese folktale about a rabbit and a villainous tanuki. However, he believed that just because a rabbit was the main character did not mean that it had to be an actual rabbit. He chose a bunny girl as the protagonist of the game, naming her Rami Nanahikari, and reducing her breast size in order to fit his vision. He additionally stated that the attire was chosen so that Rami could easily be seen onscreen during gameplay. Rami was also going to have a slightly mature look with longer hair and fishnet stockings (later changed to tights) for her bunny suit, but those ideas were dropped. The developers wanted to make the game more comedic than serious in order to appeal to a wider audience. Due to this, Honda had to create a worldview that fit with the idea. He also wanted it to have a sense of unity, where cute and strange characters could coexist, and be reminiscent of the eve of a festival. He decided to have the game take place in the Edo Shogunate period, feeling that it would be interesting if were set in the past rather than the future. While the first three stages were set in the Edo Shugonate period, the others were set in "parallel worlds". A robot rabbit named Usagimaru was planned to be included as a Sub-Weapon, but was cut and replaced with the Explosive Throwing Stars.

Tawada wanted to make the soundtrack more extravagant, so he composed some parts where players could enjoy the music alone, regardless of whether it fit the game. The music also had a strong focus on Japanese sounds. Keio Flying Squadron used a Japanese drum-like sound, which had a floor tom sound that was processed to create the effect of two drumsticks being struck with a time lag trigger. The musical instruments used in the game's soundtrack were recorded using two Yamaha SY99 FM+PCM tone generation hybrid synthesizers.

The game features animated cutscenes produced by Studio Pierrot. The voices were recorded at Magic Capsule in April 1993, provided by Miho Kanno, Akiko Hiramatsu, Jōji Yanami, Keiko Yamamoto and Yusaku Yara. Keio Flying Squadron was Kanno's first time voice acting, with her playing the role of Rami, applying for it out of curiosity. Due to this, she was initially nervous about working with the other actors and had hay fever, but quickly got along with everyone and had a fun time recording for the game.

The game has a hidden bonus minigame, "LSI Game Neko" ("Super Catch Game" in the English versions), a parody of vintage LCD games which can be accessed by entering a cheat code on the start/options screen; playing as a cat, the goal is to catch as many of the falling objects as possible.

When Keio Flying Squadron was released in Europe and North America, some changes were made. A splash screen for the game appears after the Victor/JVC logo in the Japanese and European versions, but was removed from the North American version. Different "tutorials" by Dr. Pon explaining some mechanics and his minions from the first two stages (Kodakara No. 1, Tekkannon, a heavy armored chahakobi ningyō machine, the Aisai-go, and Victor's dog mascot Nipper, who rides on a tamati) were removed. (Note: Attributed to multiple references:) Rami, Spot and Dr. Pon were given the ages 20, 11, and 3003 years old, respectively, with Spot's gender changed from male to female. A title card at the beginning of each stage where a tanuki unravels a scroll containing the title was removed. In the Japanese version, contact with solid terrain is fatal outside of boss fights, and most enemies flash different colors when hit. In the English versions, touching the ground does nothing, and only the bosses flash different colors when hit. The game's title logo was removed from the stage previews for the North American version. A few extensive monologues from Rami (with Spot and Grandma) and Dr. Pon before the stages were also cut, with only Rami saying the chapters' names and saying, "Push to start!" being translated. A cutscene in which Rami and Spot learn about the Secret Treasure's whereabouts from the Old Testament in Edo Castle's library was removed. The U.S. military forces were renamed the "U.S. Navy".

The game's English translation and voice recording was done at Watanabe-Robins & Associates, with the voices provided by Samantha Paris and Roger L. Jackson. Paris got the audition for Rami from her agent, went to their office to record it, and was hired for the job. Jackson first trained with Paris at her school Voicetrax before he became a professional voice actor.

== Release ==
Keio Flying Squadron was released in Japan on August 6, 1993, in Europe in December 1994, and in North America on February 4, 1995. In the United Kingdom, a playable demo disc for Keio Flying Squadron containing the first stage was provided by the Sega Pro CD magazine in its December 1994 issue. While the demo ends after the first stage, it is identical to the full version, and the whole game is accessible in the demo disc by using a level select cheat code. JVC also sent out bunny ears with copies of the game.

In July 2020, Limited Run Games CEO Josh Fairhurst stated that he tried to get a rerelease of Keio Flying Squadron going, but JVC would not do it without official blessing from Sega.

=== Novel ===
On April 9, 1996, Victor Novels published Keiō Yūgekitai〈1〉Hakobune-hen (慶応遊撃隊〈1〉方舟編, Keio Flying Squadron Volume 1: Ark Edition), written by Tokuji Komine. The book loosely adapts and expands the plot of the game, with the addition of two new characters; Alexander Gray, a mysterious British intelligence officer who investigates the secrets of the Ark; and Reira Nanahikari, Rami's missing mother. Both characters help Rami and Spot throughout in retrieving the Key to the Secret Treasure from Dr. Pon.

== Reception ==
Reception

Review scores
| Publication | Score |
|---|---|
| Beep! MegaDrive | 7.0/10 |
| Electronic Gaming Monthly | 8/10, 8/10, 7/10, 8/10, 8/10 |
| Famitsu | 6/10, 4/10, 7/10, 5/10 |
| Game Informer | 4.75/10 |
| Game Players | 28% |
| Mean Machines Sega | 90/100 |
| Next Generation | 2/5 |
| Dengeki Mega Drive | 66/100, 70/100, 80/100, 70/100 |
| Digital Press | 8/10 |
| Hippon Super! | 3/10 |
| Mega | 89% |
| Mega Action | 90% |
| MegaTech | 90/100 |
| Sega Force Mega | 60/100 |
| Sega Magazine | 82/100 |
| Sega Power | 81% |
| Sega Pro | 78% |
| VideoGames | 8/10 |

In Japan, Keio Flying Squadron sold slowly by word-of-mouth due to an ineffective advertising campaign, but its reputation spread and it gained a cult following after its release. The game was met with average critical sentiments. In 1996, the game was said to have become popular in Europe and North America.

Sega Pro's Jason Johnson and Mark Hill called the Japanese release of the game one of "many mediocre releases on CD", and stated that it "contains bland and unoriginal ideas that will disappoint most players". Mark Pilkington would review the English version two years later in 1995, stating, "It's creepy, it's kooky and a perfect introduction to shoot-'em-ups." Mean Machines Sega's Tom Cox stated that the game "look[ed] like a complete rip-off of Konami's Parodius", but praised the game for its "fresh ideas", such as the enemies and bosses and the soundtrack "being played on genuine oriental instruments". Sega Magazine's Tom Guise and Richard Leadbetter deemed it "an enjoyable, playable blaster that doesn't push the Mega-CD's capabilities, but adds a good game to its catalogue". Paul Anderson of Game Informer deemed the game "an average shooter in every sense", calling the plot "corny and tasteless", while Andrew McNamara likened the "basic" gameplay to Cotton: Fantastic Night Dreams. Ross VanDerShaegen called the game "boring" and criticized the sound effects, voice acting and the character Spot. The magazine also stated that the game "falls directly into the shooter category among the likes of Gradius and R-Type". GamePro's Lawrence Neves stated that "Keio moves as smoothly as it sounds, so novice players and serious shooters alike will enjoy it". Next Generation highlighted the game's humor but felt that it "teeters on the edge of either being silly/funny or just plain stupid". M! Games reviewed the game, giving it a score of 71 out of 100. The game received a 8.0049/10 score in a 1995 readers' poll conducted by the Japanese Sega Saturn Magazine, ranking among Mega-CD and Sega Mega Drive titles at the number 119 spot.

The game has appeared on multiple top lists of Sega CD games. USgamer's Jeremy Parish called the game "one of the rarer and more expensive titles for Sega CD". Retro Gamer included it among top ten Mega CD games, calling it "a perfectly acceptable substitute" of Parodius that features "a similar style of horizontally scrolling wackiness and puts the Mega-CD hardware to good use to produce some excellent cut-scenes and a brilliant CD-quality soundtrack."
