= Nintendo Pictures =

Japanese animation studio

Nintendo Pictures Co., Ltd.

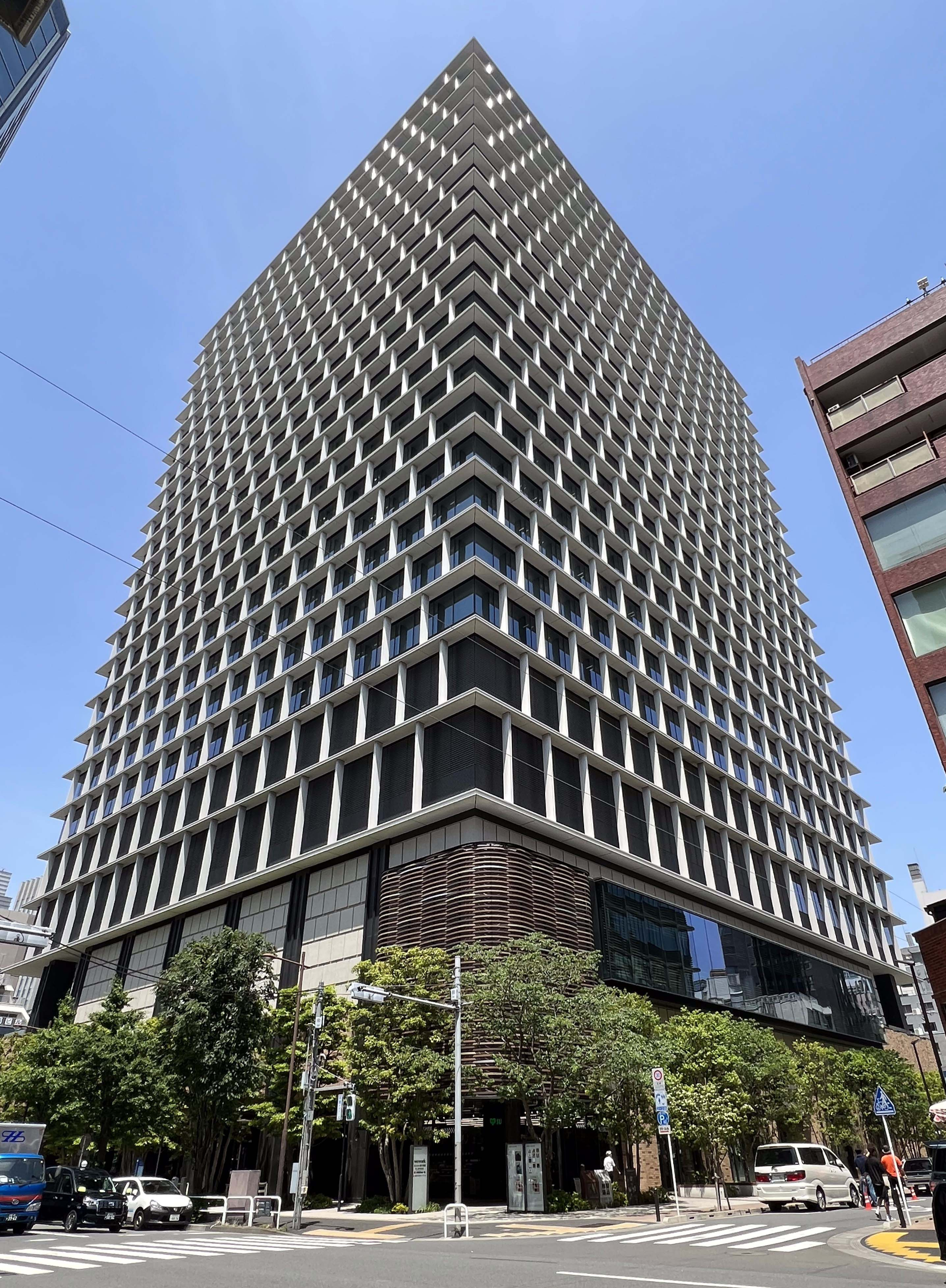
- Main office at the Kanda Square office complex
- Native name: ニンテンドーピクチャーズ株式会社
- Romanized name: Nintendō Pikuchāzu Kabushiki-gaisha
- Formerly: Dynamo Pictures, Inc. (2011–2022)
- Type: Subsidiary
- Industry: Japanese animation
- Founded: March 18, 2011; 15 years ago
- Founder: Hiroshi Hirokawa
- Headquarters: Kanda Square, 2-2-1 Kandanishiki-cho, Chiyoda, Tokyo, Japan
- Number of locations: 2 studios (2022)
- Key people: Hiroshi Hirokawa (Representative Director); Atsushi Shirokawa (Director)
- Products: CG and motion capture for video games and related media
- Total equity: 34.5 million yen
- Number of employees: 134 (2025)
- Parent: Nintendo (2022—present)
- Website: https://nintendo-pictures.co.jp

Nintendo Pictures Co., Ltd. (Note: Japanese: ニンテンドーピクチャーズ株式会社, Hepburn: Nintendō Pikuchāzu Kabushiki-gaisha) (formerly Dynamo Pictures, Inc. (Note: Japanese: 株式会社ダイナモピクチャーズ, Hepburn: Kabushiki-gaisha Dainamo Pikuchāzu)) is a Japanese animation studio based in Tokyo. Owned by Nintendo since 2022, it primarily works on video games, anime films and television series, including but not limited to Nintendo properties.

== History ==
=== As Dynamo Pictures ===
Dynamo Pictures logo

Dynamo Pictures originated as the CG and motion capture production department of Visual Science Laboratory, Inc., a computer graphics and virtual reality research and development company founded in 1991 by Kenji Yoshida. On October 1, 2004, this segment of the company was sold to Index Holdings Co., Ltd. and begin operating as Dynamo Pictures, Inc., with department head Hiroshi Hirokawa later establishing Dynamo Pictures as an independent studio on March 18, 2011.

On October 1, 2021, the "Amusement" section of the company, dedicated to creating theater and VR attractions for theme parks, was spun off into a separate business called Dynamo Amusement, Inc. and subsequently became an affiliate subsidiary of GENDA, a Japanese amusement arcade company.

=== As Nintendo Pictures ===
Nintendo announced their intent to acquire Dynamo Pictures and change its name to Nintendo Pictures on July 14, 2022, citing the focus of the company to strengthen the planning and production structure of visual content. The deal closed on October 3, with the company becoming a full subsidiary of Nintendo, as well as adopting its new name. Even after its acquisition by Nintendo, the company continues to provide its services — primarily motion capture — to other clients across television, film, video games, and live events.

In October 2025, Nintendo Pictures released Close to You, an animated short based on the Pikmin series and the studio's first standalone work since the purchase. In October 2026, Nintendo announced Hello! Pikmin, a short-form series with new episodes releasing monthly starting the following month.

== Filmography ==
=== As Dynamo Pictures ===
As lead animation studio
Year	Title	Production	Notes
As Visual Science Laboratory, Inc. / Motion Capture Studio DYNAMO
1996	Kyoko Date	Virtual idol	Motion capture work done for Horipro
2000	Biohazard 4D-Executer	Animated short film	Distributed by Digital Amuse for Japanese theme parks
As Dynamo Pictures, Inc.
2011	Appleseed XIII	Original net animation	First episode only, produced by Production I.G
2014	Pikmin Short Movies	Original net animation	Produced for Nintendo, originally distributed on Nintendo 3DS and Wii U eShops
2015–2016	Yuuyake Dandan	Theatrical short films	Produced for 109 Cinemas movie theater chain
2018	Eiga Okaa-san to Issho - Hajimete no Daibōken	Live-action film	Animated segments, produced by NHK Educational TV
2018–2019	Monster Strike the Animation	Original net animation	Episodes 25–37, 51–57, 61
2020	ARP Backstage Pass	TV anime	Directed by Tetsuya Endo
2020	Eiga Okaasan to Issho Surikaekamen wo Tsukamaero!!	Live-action film	Animated segments, produced by NHK Educational TV
2020	Monster Strike the Movie: Lucifer - Zetsubō no Yoake	Animated film	Co-production with Anima
2021	Eiga Okaasan to Issho Henteko Sekai Kara no Dasshutsu!	Live-action film	Animated segments, produced by NHK Educational TV

Amusement section
Year	Title
2020	Mega Man VR: The Virtual World is Under Attack
2021	Ace Attorney VR No. 20 Incident

As production assistance
Year	Title	Client	Production	Credit
As Visual Science Laboratory, Inc. / Motion Capture Studio DYNAMO
1995	Center Ring Boxing	Victor Entertainment	Video game	Opening CG Animation
1996	Tōkidenshō Angel Eyes	Tecmo	Video game	Motion capture
1996	Reel Fishing	Victor Interactive Software	Video game	CG Movie
1996	Dead or Alive	Team Ninja	Video game	Motion capture
1996	Bishōjo Senshi Sailor Moon SuperS: Shin Shuyaku Sōdatsusen	Angel	Video game	Opening animation, character animation, motion capture
2000	Reel Fishing II	Victor Interactive Software	Video game	CG movie
2001	Reel Fishing: Wild	Westone Bit Entertainment	Video game	Opening movie (visuals)
2001	Malice@Doll	GAGA Communications	Original video animation	CG production
2002	Shinobi	Overworks	Video game	Motion capture
2002	Lupin the 3rd: Treasure of the Sorcerer King	Banpresto	Video game	Motion capture
2003	Dead or Alive Xtreme Beach Volleyball	Tecmo	Video game	Movie support, technology support (motion capture)
2003	Last Exile	Gonzo	TV anime	3DCG production (Episode 20)
2003	Superflat Monogram	Toei Animation	Animated short film	Production assistance
2003	Simple 2000 Ultimate Series Vol. 23: Project Minerva Professional	Flat-Out, Inc.	Video game	Motion capture
2003	Nightshade	Sega Wow	Video game	Motion capture
2003	Bujingai	Taito	Video game	Motion capture
2004	Seven Samurai 20XX	Dimps	Video game	Motion capture
2004	Shadow Hearts: Covenant	Nautilus	Video game	Cooperation (Motion capture)
2004	Ninja Gaiden	Team Ninja	Video game	Motion capture
2004	KOF: Maximum Impact	Noise Factory	Video game	Cinematics
2004	WWE SmackDown! vs. Raw	Yuke's	Video game	Motion capture
2004	Rumble Roses	Yuke's	Video game	Motion capture
2004–2005	Zoids: Fuzors	Tokyo Kids	TV anime	CGI assistance
As Dynamo Pictures, Inc.
2005	Tengai Makyō III: Namida	Red Entertainment	Video game	Motion capture
2005	Killer7	Capcom	Video game	3D animation unit (Game part crew)
2005	Shadow Hearts: From the New World	Nautilus	Video game	Cooperator (Motion capture, CG movie)
2005	WWE Day of Reckoning 2	Yuke's	Video game	Motion capture
2005	Front Mission 5: Scars of the War	Square Enix	Video game	Motion capture
2006	Samurai Champloo: Sidetracked	Grasshopper Manufacture	Video game	Motion capture
2006	Rumble Roses XX	Yuke's	Video game	Motion capture (Entrance demo)
2006	Raw Danger!	Irem	Video game	Motion capture
2006	Metal Slug	SNK Playmore	Video game	Movie & demo character
2006	WWE Smackdown vs. Raw 2007	Yuke's	Video game	Additional motion capture
2007	Lost Odyssey	Feelplus; Mistwalker	Video game	Motion capture
2008	20th Century Boys: Beginning of the End	Cinebazar; Office Crescendo	Live-action film	CG production
2009	Suzumiya Haruhi no Gekidō	Kadokawa Shoten	Video game	Motion capture
2009	20th Century Boys 2: The Last Hope	Cinebazar; Office Crescendo	Live-action film	CG production
2009	Evangelion: 2.0 You Can (Not) Advance	Khara	Animated film	CG production
2009	Boku no Natsuyasumi 4	Millennium Kitchen	Video game	CG production
2009	Castle Under Fiery Skies	Toei Company	Live-action film	CG production
2009	Wacky World of Sports	Tabot	Video game	Motion capture
2009	Ninja Gaiden Sigma 2	Team Ninja	Video game	Motion capture
2009	Yona Yona Penguin	Madhouse; DFP	Animated film	CG production
2010	Metroid: Other M	Nintendo	Video game	CG production
2010	LovePlus+	Konami	Video game	CG production
2011	Final Fantasy XIII-2	Square Enix	Video game	CG production
2012	The Life of Budori Gusuko	Tezuka Productions	Animated film	CG production
2013	Tokimeki Restaurant☆☆☆	Konami	Video game	Video production
2013	Harlock: Space Pirate	Marza Animation Planet	Animated film	CG production
2014	Giovanni's Island	Production I.G.	Animated film	Motion capture
2014	Kano	ARS Film Production	Live-action film	VFX
2014	M3: The Dark Metal	Satelight	TV anime	CG production
2014	ST Aka to Shirō no Sōsa File	Nippon TV	Live-action series	VFX
2014	Love Live! School Idol Paradise	Dingo Inc.	Video game	Motion capture
2015-2016	Garo: Crimson Moon	MAPPA	TV anime	CG production cooperation
2016	Garo: Divine Flame	MAPPA	Animated film	CG animation
2016	DAYS	MAPPA	TV anime	CG production
2016	Kingsglaive: Final Fantasy XV	Visual Works	Animated film	CG production
2016	Debusen	Hulu Japan; Nippon TV	Live-action series	CG composition
2016	Persona 5	Atlus	Video game	Motion capture
2016	Yuri!!! on ICE	MAPPA	TV anime	3DCGI (eps 1–4), CG Modeling
2016	Monster Hunter Stories	Capcom; Marvelous	Video game	Motion capture
2016	Yo-kai Watch: Soratobu Kujira to Double no Sekai no Daibōken da Nyan!	OLM	Animated/live-action film	CG production
2016-2018	Puzzle & Dragons X	Pierrot	TV anime	CG production, motion capture, ending credits
2016-2018	Chi's Sweet Adventure	Marza Animation Planet	TV anime	CG production
2017	Onihei Hankachō	Studio M2	TV anime	CG Production, photography
2017	Resident Evil: Vendetta	Marza Animation Planet	Animated film	Motion capture
2017	Monster Strike LIVE!	XFLAG	Live attraction	Video production
2017	TsukiPro the Animation	PRA	TV anime	3DCG production, opening credits
2017–2018	Monster Strike: The Fading Cosmos	Yokohama Animation Laboratory	Original net animation	CG production
2018	Alice Gear Aegis	Pyramid	Video game	Motion capture
2018	Monster Hunter World	Capcom	Video game	Motion capture
2018	Shimajiro Mahō no Shima no Daibōken	The Answer Studio	Animated film	Animation production cooperation
2018–2019	22/7 Keisanchū	Tokyo MX	Variety show	CG production
2019	The Price of Smiles	Tatsunoko Production	TV anime	3DCGI production
2019	Death Stranding	Kojima Productions	Video game	Motion capture
2021	Back Arrow	Studio VOLN	TV anime	CG production
2021	IDOLY PRIDE	Lerche	TV anime	Motion capture
2021	Tropical-Rouge! Pretty Cure	Toei Animation	TV anime	CG production cooperation
2021	WIXOSS Diva(A)Live	J.C.STAFF	TV anime	Motion capture (ending credits, eps 7–8)
2021	NieR Replicant_ver.1.22474487139...	Toy Logic	Video game	Facial capture, motion production
2021	TsukiPro the Animation 2	PRA	TV anime	3DCG production, opening credits
2021	Earwig and the Witch	Studio Ghibli	Animated film	CG animation production
2021	Macross Δ the Movie: Absolute Live!!!!!!	Satelight	Animated film	CG animation production
2021	Tropical-Rouge! Pretty Cure the Movie: The Snow Princess and the Miraculous Ring!	Toei Animation	Animated film	CG production cooperation
2021–2022	Monster Strike	XFLAG	Video game	Video production
2022	Ghost in the Shell: SAC_2045	Production I.G; Sola Digital Arts	Original net animation	Layout (Season 2)
2022	Watashi Dake no Okosama Lunch	Toei Animation	Animated short film	CG production cooperation
2022–2023	Delicious Party♡Precure	Toei Animation	TV anime	CG production cooperation

=== As Nintendo Pictures ===
Year	Title	Client	Production	Credit
2023	Soaring Sky! Pretty Cure	Toei Animation	TV anime	CG production cooperation
2023	Ensemble Stars!! Recollection Selection: Element	DandeLion Animation Studio; Happy Elements Cacalia Studio	Original net animation	Animation cooperation (Episode 5)
2023	The Legend of Zelda: Tears of the Kingdom	Nintendo EPD	Video game	Cinematic animation
2023	Pikmin 4	Nintendo EPD; Eighting	Video game	Cutscene animation
2023	Super Mario Bros. Wonder	Nintendo EPD	Video game	Character design, character action design, field design, cinematic design, technical support, project management
2023	Super Mario RPG	ArtePiazza	Video game	Character art, animation art, technical art
2023	HATSUNE MIKU EXPO 2023 VR	Crypton Future Media	Virtual concert	Motion editing
2024	Another Code: Recollection	Arc System Works	Video game	3D animation
2024	Ganbatte Ikimasshoi	Studio Moe; Reirs	Animated film	Motion capture
2024–2025	Wonderful PreCure!	Toei Animation	TV anime	CG production assistance
2025	Death Stranding 2	Kojima Productions	Video game	Motion capture
2025	Close to You	Nintendo	Short film	Lead animation
2025	Double Dragon Revive	Yuke's	Video game	Motion capture
2025–2026	You and Idol Pretty Cure	Toei Animation	TV anime	CG production assistance
2026	Romeo is a Dead Man	Grasshopper Manufacture	Video game	Motion capture
2026	Super Mario Bros. Wonder + Meetup in Bellabel Park	Nintendo EPD	Video game	Character design, character action design, field design, cinematic design, technical support, project management
2026	The Legend of Zelda: Ocarina of Time	Nintendo EPD	Video game	Landscape modeling, character modeling, motion capture, project management
2026–2027	Star Detective Precure!	Toei Animation	TV anime	CG production assistance
2026–present	Hello! Pikmin	Nintendo	Short film	Lead animation
