= Burning Soldier =

1994 video game

- Developer: Genki Co., Ltd.
- Publishers: JP: Pack-In-Video; NA/EU: Panasonic
- Director: Manami Kuroda
- Producer: Hiroshi Hamagaki
- Designer: Manabu Tamura
- Programmer: Yoshinari Sunazuka
- Artists: Manabu Tamura; Mika Urushiyama; Takashi Isoko
- Composers: Haruhiko Nishioka; Takefumi Haketa
- Platforms: 3DO, Windows
- Release: 3DO: JP: 25 June 1994; NA/EU: October 1994; Windows: JP: 1998
- Genre: Rail shooter
- Modes: Single-player, multiplayer

Burning Soldier (Note: Japanese: バーニング・ソルジャー, Hepburn: Bāningu Sorujā) is a 1994 rail shooter video game developed by Genki and originally published by Panasonic and Pack-In-Video in North America, Japan and Europe exclusively on 3DO. The first title created by Genki for the 3DO platform, the game is set in a futuristic Solar System in 2095 where a war against humanity erupts with the arrival of the Kaisertian alien race, as players assume the role of an Earth Defense Force fighter pilot taking control of the mecha-style Strike space fighter craft in an effort to overthrow the invaders and end the conflict. Its gameplay mainly consists of shooting mixed alongside full motion video with sprite-based enemies imposed on them using a main two-button configuration.

Headed by Sword of Vermilion director Hiroshi Hamagaki alongside Kileak: The DNA Imperative writer Manami Kuroda, Burning Soldier was created as a collaboration effort between Genki, Pack-In Video and Panasonic by most of the same team that would later work on several projects such as later entries in the Shutokou Battle franchise and future works from Genki. Though it was first launched for the 3DO, the game would later be ported to Microsoft Windows and released exclusively in Japan by Itochu Corporation on 3 April 1998, featuring very minimal changes and additions compared with the original version.

Burning Soldier garnered mixed reception by critics from video game magazines and dedicated outlets that reviewed the game since its original release on 3DO, who felt mixed in regards to several aspects such as the presentation, graphics and gameplay that drew comparison with both Starblade and Star Wars: Rebel Assault due to its nature, though the music received praise by some reviewers.

== Gameplay ==

Top: Rail shooter segment.
Bottom: Guardian boss fight.
(3DO version showcased)

Burning Soldier is a science fiction-themed on rails game that is primarily played in a first-person perspective inside the ship, reminiscent of Starblade. Either one or two players simultaneously assume the role of an Earth Defense Force fighter pilot taking control of the mecha-style Strike space fighter craft through 18 stages arranged into four missions, each of which ends with a boss that must be defeated to progress further, in an effort to overthrow an invading alien race known as the Kaisertians from conquering the Solar System as the main objective. By entering a cheat code at the options menu, players have access to debug mode, where more settings can be accessed including the ability to play with four players simultaneously.

During gameplay, players must aim their reticle at incoming enemies and other hazards that appear on screen and shoot them before they hit the Strike ship to reduce its health bar. If the players are unable to destroy an enemy before it fires solid projectiles, damage can still be avoided by shooting the projectiles instead. Players can also use a charge attack by holding down the B button for approximately 1.5 seconds and then releasing it, launching homing shots at all on-screen enemies, however, it cannot target projectiles or bosses. Moreover, the player cannot fire while either charging or holding a charge.

All of the stages are rendered as a non-looping full motion video, including the boss stages and if the full motion video plays out before players manage to defeat the boss during this sequence, the players receive an immediate game over regardless of how much health they had left because of this. There are no extra lives, but the player has infinite continues, which allow them to resume from the beginning of the current mission.

== Synopsis ==
Burning Soldier takes place in the year 2095, where an ancient alien race known as the Kaisertians arrived into the Solar System and began a war against mankind. The Kaisertians had previously colonized Earth tens of thousands of years before but the civilization they established there was destroyed long ago by a massive flood. The players assume the role of an Earth Defense Force fighter pilot taking control of the mecha-style Strike space fighter craft to repel the Kaisertian invasion. In the first mission, the Strike fighter pilot is sent to destroy the Kaisertian's flagship Indra, which obliterated a human colony on Mars and although the operation was a success, Earth still fell under control of the Kaisertians and as such, it prompts the Strike fighter and the Earth Defense Force with returning to Earth and counterattack the Kaisertian operation center established in Tokyo, which is under attack by a Kaisertian capital ship named Guardian. After completing the second mission, the Strike fighter and the defense forces proceed underground, where the Kaisertian's main base is located but they are quickly ambushed by one of the alien's fighter ship known as Bug. Once the ship is destroyed, the Strike fighter's final mission is to destroy the core of the Kaisertian base.

== Development and release ==
Most of the artwork were first created by Tamura as hand-drawn sketches before being transpose to pre-rendered graphics.

Burning Soldier was created as a collaboration effort between Genki, Pack-In Video and Panasonic by most of the same team that would later work on several projects such as later entries in the Shutokou Battle franchise and future projects from Genki. Its development was helmed by producer and Genki co-founder Hiroshi Hamagaki alongside Manami Kuroda acting as director, with Yoshinari Sunazuka being the project's sole programmer. Super Magnetic Neo director Manabu Tamura served as character designer for the game and he was also responsible for creating the computer graphics along with Hamagaki, Takashi Isoko and Mika Urushiyama. Multiple people were involved in the sound design including Scramble Cobra director Yasuki Ohno as sound producer along with Shinichi Kuroda directing the soundtrack, which was co-written by Haruhiko Nishioka and Takefumi Haketa, while the sound effects were created by Satoshi Aizato, in addition of Kiyoshi Toba and Kileak: The DNA Imperative producer Tomoharu Kimura acting as audio engineers respectively. The narration voice work was done by Nigel Hogge prior to his role in Vandal Hearts, while actress Robbie Danzie was the singer for the ending vocal track "Summer Leads the Way". Several other people were also involved in the production.

Burning Soldier was first released for the 3DO Interactive Multiplayer in Japan by Pack-In-Video on 25 June 1994 and later by Panasonic across western regions. Despite its Japanese origin, the game has never been translated into Japanese, while both the Japanese and western releases are fully voice acted in English with no subtitles or story-based text of any kind. Early previews for the 3DO version before launch in publications such as the Japanese 3DO Magazine showcased a different HUD compared to the final version. On 24 September 1994, an album was published exclusively in Japan by Polydor, featuring two arranged songs co-composed by Nishioka and Haketa. On 3 April 1998, a conversion of Burning Soldier for Windows 95 was released exclusively in Japan by Itochu Corporation, featuring very minimal changes and additions compared with the original 3DO version.

== Reception and legacy ==
Reception

Review scores
Publication	Score
Consoles +	(3DO) 75%
Computer and Video Games	(3DO) 79 / 100
Edge	(3DO) 2 / 10
Electronic Gaming Monthly	(3DO) 26 / 40
GameFan	(3DO) 228 / 300
Next Generation	(3DO) 2/5
3DO Magazine	(3DO) 2/5
Game Zero Magazine	(3DO) 29.5 / 50
Génération 4	(3DO) 84%
Strana Igr	(3DO) 4- / 10
Video Games	(3DO) 63%

Award
Publication	Award
GameFan (1994)	Best FMV (3DO), Best Music (3DO)

Burning Soldier received mixed reception from critics since its initial release on the 3DO Interactive Multiplayer. Consoles +'s Nicolas Gavet praised the presentation, graphics and music, comparing it with both Silpheed and Galaxian3: Project Dragoon, but felt mixed in regards to the short length when playing on the easiest difficulty. Computer and Video Games' Deniz Ahmet and Rik Skews commended its animated visuals, futuristic atmosphere, sound and reticle-based gameplay to be entertaining but remarked that, like Star Wars: Rebel Assault, the aforementioned gameplay becomes repetitive. However, a reviewer of Edge gave a very negative outlook to the game, criticizing the overall visual presentation and gameplay, stating that "Burning Soldier is the most uninspiring 3DO release ever." Electronic Gaming Monthly's four reviewers regarded it as an enjoyable Sewer Shark clone, giving positive remarks to the audiovisual presentation but criticized its linear gameplay. GameFan's three reviewers noted its seamless combination of full motion video backgrounds with sprites, as well as the graphics and music, but criticized said gameplay for being "one dimensional" and its stiff controls. GameFan also awarded the title in their 1994 Golden Megawards for "Best Music" and "Best FMV" on 3DO.

While comparing it unfavorably to Shock Wave, primarily due to the more simplistic gameplay, GamePro praised the game's cinematics, detailed enemies and explosions, atmospheric music, and hefty challenge when playing on the hard difficulty setting, calling it "a long, intense fight that'll test experienced rocket jockeys." Next Generation stated that "The graphics are fairly well done, and in its brain-dead, shoot-everything-that-moves way, it's not a bad game, but beyond that limited stimulus-response experience, there's not much gaming here." 3DO Magazine's Stuart Wynne praised the enemy sprite designs, pre-rendered visual presentation and two-player mode but criticized its overall short length. The two reviewers of Game Zero Magazine commended the graphics and sound design, however they also criticized its stiff controls and the two-player component. Génération 4's Thierry Falcoz gave positive remarks to the film-like presentation, graphics, music and two-player mode but also criticized its short length. Strana Igr gave the game a negative outlook. Robert Zengerle of German magazine Video Games felt mixed in regards to both visuals and sound design.
