= The Black Bass =

The Black Bass may refer to:

- The Black Bass (1984 video game)
- The Black Bass (1988 video game)

== See also ==
- Black bass or Micropterus, a freshwater fish genus
- Papuan black bass, or Lutjanus goldiei, a species of freshwater and brackish water ray-finned fish
