= Legend of the River King =

1997 video game

- Developer: Tose
- Publisher: NA: Natsume
- Series: River King
- Platforms: Game Boy, Game Boy Color
- Release: Game Boy: JP: September 19, 1997; NA: August 1998; AU: 1999; Game Boy Color: NA: November 23, 1999
- Genres: Fishing, role-playing game
- Mode: Single-player

Legend of the River King (Note: Japanese: 川のぬし釣り3, Hepburn: Kawa no Nushi Tsuri 3) is a 1997 fishing and role-playing game originally released for the Game Boy in 1997. It is part of the River King series and has the player controlling an avid young boy who must seek out the Guardian Fish to cure his sick sister. To do so, the player must collect fish and other items to traverse to newer areas to find the Guardian Fish.

Originally released in 1997 in Japan, it became the first Western release of any game in the River King series on its release for the Game Boy in 1998 in North America. It was released for the Game Boy Color in 1999 with some small extra features added to the game.

On its release, reviewers in Famitsu generally found the gameplay to be too similar to that of earlier titles in the series while reviewers in Electronic Gaming Monthly found it's hybrid of fishing and RPG to not be enjoyable as similarly themed titles like Harvest Moon (1996). Other reviewers from Allgame, IGN and later NintendoLife found the game enjoyable for its hybrid of fishing and RPG mechanics.

== Plot and gameplay ==
Legend of the River King is part fishing game part role-playing video game. In the game, the main character is a young boy who has to cure his sister of a rare disease. The only known cure is the magical power of the legendary Guardian Fish. The young boy heads out to catch this fish to help his sister.

The gameplay has players catch various fish and sell them for supplies to help the player in this quest. In the original Game Boy game, there are 40 different fish, and various items to collect that range from eight forms of fishing baits, lures, and flies along with various fishing rods and hooks. Other items can be found to restore energy while others are for in-game trades. The player progresses to new fishing locations as the game progresses, such as obtaining a raft in the first area allows the player's character to drift downstream to a new town and a larger lake.

There are also battles with wild animals such as bears, snakes eagles and monkeys in an RPG-styled format. These battles are a small portion of the game, where the player has the option to fight the animal or run away. On fighting them, a screen appears showing the enemy and both the health points (HP) the player and enemy have. Each animal has their own weak points. After selecting attack, a small fist will appearing in different places on the screen. The aim is to press the button when it is over the enemy to deal damage. The longer the player waits to push the button, the faster the fist moves around the screen. Losing battles with animals can make the player lose a fish they have caught. Winning battles allows the player to gaine experience points which can increase their character's health, allowing them to cast their fishing lines out further, row across rivers faster and have more HP for later battles.

The game also features an aquarium for caught fish. It features a raising sim styled game play that was reminiscent of Tamagotchi games that were popular at the time. This part of the game features feeding, cleaning and taking care of fish and their environment to encourage their growth.

== Development and release ==
Legend of the River King was developed by Tose. The fishing portions of the game have similar gameplay to the Reel Fishing PlayStation game.

Legend of the River King was released for the Game Boy in Japan on September 19, 1997. It was later released in North America on August 1998 where it was published by Natsume and Australia in 1999. It was the first game in the River King series to be release in the West.

The game was released for the Game Boy Color in North America on November 23, 1999. Other than being presented in color, this version of the game adds some features such as some new bridges on the world map to make moving around easier and six extra types of fish that can be caught. Both versions features a bonus lake called Fun Lake. While the original Game Boy did not allow fish here to be recorded, the Game Boy Color features allows this. A sequel, Legend of the River King 2 was released in 2001 for the Game Boy Color. Both Legend of the River King and Legend of the River King 2 were re-released as a Game Boy Advance video game compilation as Kawa no Nushi Tsuri 3&4 in Japan on February 9, 2006. This title was released for the Wii U Virtual Console in Japan.

The Game Boy Color version was re-released digitally for the Nintendo 3DS Virtual Console on March 28, 2013.

== Reception ==
Reception

Review scores
Publication	Score
AllGame	4.5/5 (GBC)
Electronic Gaming Monthly	4/10, 4/10, 4/10, 2/10 (GB)
Famitsu	6/10, 6/10, 5/10, 6/10 (GB)
IGN	7/10 (GB)
Nintendo Power	7.4/10 (GB)
Game Buyer	4/5 (GB)

Reviewing the original release in Japan, the game was reviewed by four editors in Famitsu magazine. Two reviewers found it basically unchanged in general mechanics from the earlier River King games, with one saying that handheld game, this was not too much of a problem. Two reviewers found the new aquarium features to be a somewhat uninspired take on Tamagotchi-styled games, while one reviewer said it was more fun than the main quest in the game.

Nintendo Power recommended it for fans of more offbeat games like Harvest Moon and E.V.O.: Search for Eden (1992). Four reviewers in Electronic Gaming Monthly generally dismissed the game, with two saying the hybrid of RPG and fishing game was poor, with one recommending Harvest Moon or Reel Fishing as similar and superior games. A reviewer for IGN alternatively found the game had plenty to do to keep players occupied with its RPG and virtual pet gameplay elements gave the game depth that "propels it to the top of its genre." A reviewer in Game Buyer magazine found the fishing segments to be complex for a Game Boy title, and that they had lots of intricacies to manage. They ultimately described it as being "Fun, strange and incredibly deep."

Joe Ottoson of AllGame complimented the graphics on the Game Boy Color version of the game, saying that most Game Boy Color games barely produced graphics that were superior earlier Game Boy games, while Legend of the River King "quite simply blooms." Ottoson praised the colorful environments and the underwater fishing areas that feature parallax scrolling as being particularly effective. Ottoson ultimately said that as most RPGs favored convention, he praised Legend of the River King for "offering a relaxing atmosphere and an intimate, small scale quest."

=== Retrospective ===
Reception

Review scores
Publication	Score
Nintendo Life	8/10
Nintendo World Report	3/10

Reviewing the game upon its Nintendo 3DS re-release, a reviewer for Nintendo World Report found the fishing mechanics monotonous, and the RPG mechanics made the game to be a slow grind. A reviewer for Nintendo Life ultimately found Legend of the River King to be short but found it enjoyable as a rare hybrid of fishing game and RPG.
