= Black Bass: Lure Fishing =

1992 video game

- Japanese cover art
- Developer: Hot B
- Publisher: Hot B
- Series: The Black Bass
- Platforms: Game Boy; Game Boy Color
- Release: Game Boy: JP: August 28, 1992; NA: January 1994; Game Boy Color: EU: 1999; NA: 1999
- Genre: Fishing
- Modes: Single-player; Multiplayer

Black Bass: Lure Fishing (ハイパーブラックバス, Hyper Black Bass) is a 1992 fishing video game for the Game Boy. It was ported to the North American and European Game Boy Color in 1999.

== Summary ==
The player is able to fish at two different lakes using a variety of lures. Casting takes place on an overhead view with one meter for the direction and another meter for the shadow of the fish. The player can catch trout, pike, catfish, and the infamous black bass.

The Game Boy Color re-release allows players to play against 99 AI-controlled fishermen. Tournament hours are twelve non-real time hours long, and all locations are fictional. Each game originally came with a 40-page instruction manual and a precautions booklet. Both versions of the game notify players when they have lost their lure and/or their fish through a text-based message. Once a player runs out of a certain kind of fishing lure, it cannot be recovered until the next gameplay.

== Reception ==
Reception

Review score
Publication	Score
Electronic Gaming Monthly	7/10, 5/10, 4/10, 4/10

GamePro gave the game a positive review, saying it is highly enjoyable despite being essentially a pared-down conversion of Super Black Bass. They praised the controls, addictive challenge, and the use of 3D graphics when fighting a hooked fish.
