= Blue marlin (disambiguation) =

Blue marlin is a common name for fish in the genus Makaira

Blue marlin may also refer to:

- MV Blue Marlin, a heavy transport ship
- The Blue Marlin, a 1991 fishing video game for the Nintendo Entertainment System
