= River King: A Wonderful Journey =

2005 video game

- North American box art
- Developer: Marvelous
- Publisher: Natsume
- Series: River King
- Platform: PlayStation 2
- Release: JP: January 27, 2005; EU: November 16, 2005; NA: March 28, 2006
- Genres: Fishing, role-playing
- Mode: Single-player

River King: A Wonderful Journey, known in Europe as Harvest Fishing and in Japan as Fishing Master of the River: Wonderful Journey (Note: Japanese: 川 の ぬし 釣り: Wonderful Journey, Hepburn: Kawa no Nushi Tsuri: Wandafuru jānī) is a 2005 fishing role-playing video game developed by Marvelous for the PlayStation 2. It follows a family as they attempt to catch a fish known as the "River King".

== Gameplay ==
River King: A Wonderful Journey is a fishing role-playing video game. At the start of the game, the player picks their player character from a member of a family, consisting of a brother, sister, mother, and father, and is then tasked with finding a fish called the "River King".

== Reception ==
Reception

Aggregate score
Aggregator	Score
Metacritic	51/100

Review scores
Publication	Score
GameSpot	5.8/10
IGN	5.5/10

The game garnered mixed reception, according to review aggregator site Metacritic. Most critics criticized it as being too simple in its gameplay and presentation.
