= River King: Mystic Valley =

2007 video game

- North American box art
- Developer: Marvelous
- Publishers: NA: Natsume; JP: Marvelous; EU: Rising Star Games
- Producers: Hikaru Nakano; Keiichi Ajiro
- Programmers: Fumio Saito; Souichi Ashida; Ken Otani; Takashi Horie
- Artist: Igusa Matsuyama
- Composer: Riyou Kinugasa
- Series: River King
- Platform: Nintendo DS
- Release: JP: June 28, 2007; NA: April 29, 2008; EU: October 16, 2009
- Genres: Fishing, role-playing
- Modes: Single-player, multiplayer

River King: Mystic Valley, known in Europe as Harvest Fishing and in Japan as Fishing Master of the River: Valley of Sunlight, Song of the Stream, (Note: Japanese: 木漏れ日 の 谷, せせらぎ の 歌, Hepburn: Kawa no Nushi Tsuri: Komorebi no Tani, Seseragi no Uta) is a 2007 fishing role-playing video game developed by Marvelous for the Nintendo DS. It is, currently, the most recent installment in the River King series, and follows an unnamed male protagonist as they explore a valley in order to find a fish, known as "The River King", that can cure their sister from an endless slumber.

== Gameplay ==
The player, along with a tanuki monster companion, fishing by a rocky shore.

River King: Mystic Valley is a fishing role-playing video game. The player controls an unnamed male protagonist through a valley as they attempt to find a fish, known as "The River King", in order to cure their sister from an endless slumber.

== Development and release ==
The announcement of the development of one of the entries of the River King series for the Nintendo DS was made on August 2, 2004.. The game would later be shown off in Japan at the 2006 Tokyo Game Show convention, and in North America at the E3 2007 trade show under the title River King: Wonderland.

== Reception ==
Reception

Aggregate score
Aggregator	Score
Metacritic	54/100

Review scores
Publication	Score
Eurogamer	5/10
GameRevolution	3/10
GamesRadar+	2/5
IGN	5/10
Nintendo World Report	7/10

The game garnered "mixed or average" reception, according to review aggregation website Metacritic. (Note: Based on 8 reviews) Generally, reviewers viewed it as a title that lacked depth in its gameplay.
