= Reel Fishing: Wild =

2001 video game

- Developer: Westone Bit Entertainment
- Publishers: JP: Victor Interactive Software; NA: Natsume Inc.
- Series: Reel Fishing
- Platform: Dreamcast
- Release: JP: February 22, 2001; NA: July 24, 2001
- Genre: Sports (Fishing)
- Mode: Single-player

Reel Fishing: Wild, known in Japan as Fish Eyes: Wild, is a video game developed by Westone Bit Entertainment and published by Victor Interactive Software and Natsume Inc. for Dreamcast in 2001.

== Reception ==
Reception

Aggregate score
Aggregator	Score
GameRankings	59%

Review scores
Publication	Score
AllGame	2.5/5
Famitsu	27/40
IGN	6.8/10
Next Generation	3/5

The game received mixed reviews according to the review aggregation website GameRankings. Anthony Chau of IGN wrote, "Reel Fishing Wild is a pretty decent fishing game that, unlike SEGA's fishing game, doesn't capture the exciting elements of fishing, but the whole fishing experience overall. That's a nice goal, but the game doesn't accomplish this with average visuals, plain play mechanics, and music that will send you to bed." Eric Bratcher of NextGen wrote, "At full price, we'd throw this one back, but Reel Fishing actually feels a lot like real fishing. For $20, it's definitely a keeper." In Japan, Famitsu gave it a score of 27 out of 40.
