= The Blue Marlin =

1991 video game

- North American cover art
- Developer: Hot-B
- Publisher: Hot-B
- Series: The Black Bass
- Platform: Nintendo Entertainment System
- Release: JP: December 27, 1991; NA: July 1992
- Genre: Fishing
- Mode: Single-player

The Blue Marlin (ザ‧ブルーマリーン) is a 1991 fishing video game developed and published by Hot-B for the Nintendo Entertainment System (NES). Following in the tradition of its predecessors, The Black Bass for MSX and The Black Bass for NES, the objective is to win a tournament by catching the largest fish in the time allotted. The Blue Marlin features four tournament rounds (one in Florida and the other three in Hawaii). It was re-released in 2016 as a built-in game for the Retro-Bit Generations retro video game console.

== Gameplay ==
In the middle of the oceans, players can find plenty of fish to catch.

The player controls a fisherman who is competing in a tournament. The objective in each round of the tournament is to catch the largest billfish. These fish include blue marlin, black marlin, striped marlin, swordfish, and sailfish. Other fish that can be caught include dorado, barracuda, tuna, and sharks.

As the player fights fish, there may be several events that occur that the player must respond to, such as a smoking reel or a marlin attempting to cut the line on the propeller. Other events are static, such as the fish biting off the line or the fish becoming exhausted. Each of these events changes the dynamics of the fight, such as how much line the fish has or how tired the fish is.

There are three attributes that the player can increase as they fight more and more fish. These are Muscle Power (ability to pull in heavier fish), Body Strength (ability to fight a fish longer and with more power), and Skill (ability to respond to events properly).

== Password system ==
The Blue Marlin features a password system to save the player's progress. A password is generated at the end of every tournament round, and after the tournament is completed (with the player victorious). If the player uses this password to begin a new tournament, they can start over with all of their attributes from their previous game.

== Reception ==
Reception

Review scores
Publication	Score
AllGame	4/5
Electronic Gaming Monthly	7/10, 6/10, 5/10, 7/10
Entertainment Weekly	C−

AllGame gave this video game a score of 4 stars out of 5 in their overview. Entertainment Weekly gave the game a C− and wrote that "NES' The Blue Marlin is a fishing game in which you sit for long stretches in front of the television set, reel in the occasional fish, then sit again for long stretches in front of the television set. As if this weren't deadly enough, while you're perched in your video dinghy you're treated to an incessant, looped soundtrack of Japanese pseudo-jazz nonsense, the apotheosis of every tonal cliché in the history of video-game music."
