= American Bass Challenge =

2001 video game

- North American cover art
- Developer: Starfish
- Publishers: JP: Starfish; NA/EU: Ubi Soft
- Series: The Black Bass
- Platform: Game Boy Advance
- Release: JP: August 10, 2001; NA: December 5, 2001; EU: February 5, 2002
- Genre: Fishing
- Modes: Single-player, multiplayer

American Bass Challenge, known in Japan and Europe as Super Black Bass Advance, (Note: Japanese: スーパーブラックバス アドバンス) is a fishing video game developed by Starfish for the Game Boy Advance. It was published in Japan by Starfish in August 2001, and in North America and Europe by Ubi Soft in December 2001 and February 2002, respectively. It is the eleventh game in the Black Bass series, though the Black Bass name was not used for the North American release.

== Gameplay ==
Screenshot of American Bass Challenge

American Bass Challenge has a few different modes: Practice, Quick Fish, and Tournament mode. The practice mode teaches the player the ropes like expected. The only major difference between Quick Fish and Tournament mode in the way it's played out, is that in Quick Fish, the player is provided a location and a lure, while in Tournament mode, the player must decide those aspects themselves. Quick Fish includes a system link feature, that allows up to four friends to play the game at once with only one cartridge.

American Bass Challenge, despite its look, is far from an arcade game, and has a more simulation feel to it. "American Bass Challenge actually takes the other route and delivers some heavier simulation gameplay." The game hearkens back to the NES fishing days, in particular, The Black Bass series.

== Reception ==
The game garnered mostly positive reviews. GameSpot liked the depth of the game, but that the depth was also off-putting and its weakness, and gave the game a 6.1. IGN gave the game an 8 out of 10, praising it, writing, "I never thought I would say this but, I found a fishing game that rocks." GameSpy gave the game a 6.8 out of 10, calling the game an anomaly in its genre due to its quality.
