= Bassin's Black Bass with Hank Parker =

1994 video game

- North American cover art of Bassin's Black Bass with Hank Parker
- Developer: Starfish, Inc.(ja)
- Publisher: Hot B
- Composer: Akihiko Mori
- Series: The Black Bass
- Platform: Super NES
- Release: JP: September 23, 1994; NA: November 1994
- Genre: Fishing
- Mode: Single-player

Bassin's Black Bass with Hank Parker, known in Japan as Super Black Bass 2 (スーパーブラックバス２) is a 1994 tournament-based fishing video game developed by Starfish (ja) and published by Hot B for the Super Nintendo Entertainment System. It is part of the Black Bass series. The player attempts to rise up from an amateur tournament to the bass fishing championship in both versions. In the North American version, the player must compete and win against Hank Parker for the championship.

== Setting ==
The game takes place in an unknown State, in three lakes and one river.

- Green Valley Lake - The location of the Local Amateur Tournament, Green Valley Lake appears to be a glacial lake, due to its general appearance and name. Green Valley Lake is fairly shallow, and as such supports a large amount and variety of plant life, including water lilies, reeds or cat tails and weed beds.
- Onyx River - The location of the Amateur Bass Championship, Onyx River gets its name from thick sediment, making for very low visibility water. This, combined with flowing, moderately deep water makes for little plant growth. The river flows from SSE to N, with rock slides in a small, eroded oxbow in the northern portion of the east arm of the river.
- Bronze Lake - Bronze Lake is the site of the Pro Bass Tournament. Bronze Lake was formerly a farm valley before the river was dammed, as evidenced by the underwater buildings. A man-made reservoir, the largest signs of humanity are the dam at the southern end, and a garbage dump in a cove in the north east corner. Dead trees, flooded when the river was dammed, are located near the dam, on either side of the lake.
- Bluestone Lake - Chosen as the site of the Bassin' World Championship, Bluestone Lake likely gets its name from its depth, from which it receives its deep blue coloring. Its many features include dense water lilies, a road bridge running through the center of the lake, a garbage dump, and sunken weeds and cars.

== Reception ==
GamePro gave the game a positive review, saying it "hits the water with enough competition for anglers of all ages to enjoy." They praised the game's strategic decision-making and realistic graphics with changing weather. A reviewer for Next Generation remarked that after producing three SNES fishing games in as many years, Hot B "has it down to a pure science." He cited the depth and realism of the game's fishing experience and the exceptional graphics, but nonetheless gave it only three out of five stars.
