= List of River King video games =

River King (North America) or Harvest Fishing (PAL) (known in Japan as Kawa no Nushi Tsuri (川のぬし釣り, lit. "Fishing Master of the River")), and originally released in English as Legend of the River King, is a fishing-themed role playing video game series by Marvelous. The series has releases over 6 video game systems. Of these, 4 have been released in America.

In addition to the River King series, a spin-off series of saltwater fishing games has also been released called Umi no Nushi Tsuri (海のぬし釣り, lit."Fishing Master of the Sea"). The series has been released for the Game Boy, Super Nintendo, PlayStation, and Wii.

In North America and PAL regions the series was marketed as a spin-off of the Harvest Moon (Bokujō Monogatari) franchise (despite the Nushi Tsuri franchise being the older one in Japan).

== Games ==
=== Kawa no Nushi Tsuri titles ===
Game	Details
Kawa no Nushi Tsuri Original release date(s): JP: August 10, 1990	Release years by system: 1990—Famicom
Kawa no Nushi Tsuri Original release date(s): JP: August 10, 1990	Notes: Published by Pack-In-Video.; It is the first game released in the series and the only one to be released on the Famicom.
Kawa no Nushi Tsuri: Shizenha Original release date(s): JP: March 27, 1992	Release years by system: 1992—TurboGrafx-CD; 2007—Wii Virtual Console
Kawa no Nushi Tsuri: Shizenha Original release date(s): JP: March 27, 1992	Notes: Published by Pack-In-Video.; It is the only game in the series to be published onto the TurboGrafx-CD and made available on the Virtual Console.; A remake of the Famicom title that uses CD-ROM capabilities for more realistic nature sounds and sound effects, as well as an expanded fish encyclopedia.
Kawa no Nushi Tsuri 2 Original release date(s): JP: April 28, 1995	Release years by system: 1995—Super Famicom
Kawa no Nushi Tsuri 2 Original release date(s): JP: April 28, 1995	Notes: Published by Pack-In-Video.
Legend of the River King Original release date(s): JP: September 19, 1997; NA: August 1998; PAL: 1999	Release years by system: 1997—Game Boy; 1999—Game Boy Color; 2013—Nintendo 3DS Virtual Console (GBC version)
Legend of the River King Original release date(s): JP: September 19, 1997; NA: August 1998; PAL: 1999	Notes: Developed by Victor Interactive Software. Published by Victor Interactive Software in Japan and Natsume Inc. in North America and PAL regions.; Known in Japan as Kawa no Nushi Tsuri 3.; An improved colored version for the Game Boy Color was released later under the name Legend of the River King GBC.
Kawa no Nushi Tsuri Original release date(s): JP: August 20, 1998	Release years by system: 1998—PlayStation
Kawa no Nushi Tsuri Original release date(s): JP: August 20, 1998	Notes: Developed and published by Victor Interactive Software.; It is the first and only game on the PlayStation console.
Legend of the River King 2 Original release date(s): JP: July 16, 1999; PAL: March 30, 2001; NA: April 17, 2001	Release years by system: 1999—Game Boy Color; 2014—Nintendo 3DS Virtual Console
Legend of the River King 2 Original release date(s): JP: July 16, 1999; PAL: March 30, 2001; NA: April 17, 2001	Notes: Developed by Victor Interactive Software and published by Natsume Inc.; Known in Japan as Kawa no Nushi Tsuri 4.; It is the second game in the series to be published on the Game Boy Color.; Could link up with Harvest Moon GBC 2 via Game Link Cable, and also with Nushi Tsuri 64: Shiokaze Ninotte via N64 Transfer Pak (in the Japanese version only).
Kawa no Nushi Tsuri 5 Original release date(s): JP: March 15, 2002	Release years by system: 2002—Game Boy Advance
Kawa no Nushi Tsuri 5 Original release date(s): JP: March 15, 2002	Notes: Developed and published by Victor Interactive Software.
River King: A Wonderful Journey Original release date(s): JP: January 27, 2005; PAL: November 16, 2005; NA: March 28, 2006	Release years by system: 2005—PlayStation 2
River King: A Wonderful Journey Original release date(s): JP: January 27, 2005; PAL: November 16, 2005; NA: March 28, 2006	Notes: Developed by Marvelous Interactive. Published by Marvelous Interactive in Japan, Natsume Inc. in North America and 505 Game Street in Europe.; Known as Kawa no Nushi Tsuri: Wonderful Journey in Japan and as Harvest Fishing in Europe and Australia.
Kawa no Nushi Tsuri 3 & 4 Original release date(s): JP: February 9, 2006	Release years by system: 2006—Game Boy Advance
Kawa no Nushi Tsuri 3 & 4 Original release date(s): JP: February 9, 2006	Notes: Developed and published by Marvelous Interactive.; It is a remake of Kawa no Nushi Tsuri 3 and Kawa no Nushi Tsuri 4, which have been updated with improved graphics.
River King: Mystic Valley Original release date(s): JP: June 28, 2007; NA: April 29, 2008; PAL: October 16, 2009	Release years by system: 2007—Nintendo DS
River King: Mystic Valley Original release date(s): JP: June 28, 2007; NA: April 29, 2008; PAL: October 16, 2009	Notes: Developed by Marvelous Interactive. Published by Marvelous Interactive in Japan, Natsume Inc. in North America and Rising Star Games in Europe.; Known as Kawa no Nushi Tsuri: Komorebi no Tani, Seseragi no Uta in Japan and Harvest Fishing in Europe.

=== Related titles ===
Game	Details
Umi no Nushi Tsuri Original release date(s): JP: July 19, 1996	Release years by system: 1996—Super Famicom
Umi no Nushi Tsuri Original release date(s): JP: July 19, 1996	Notes: Developed and published by Pack-in-Video.
Umi no Nushi Tsuri 2 Original release date(s): JP: July 10, 1998	Release years by system: 1998—Game Boy
Umi no Nushi Tsuri 2 Original release date(s): JP: July 10, 1998	Notes: Developed by Pack-In-Video and published by Victor Interactive Software.
Nushi Tsuri 64 Original release date(s): JP: November 27, 1998	Release years by system: 1998—Nintendo 64
Nushi Tsuri 64 Original release date(s): JP: November 27, 1998	Notes: Developed by Pack-In-Video and published by Victor Interactive Software.; It is the first of the series to be released on the Nintendo 64.
Umi no Nushi Tsuri: Takarajima ni Mukatte Original release date(s): JP: July 22, 1999	Release years by system: 1999—PlayStation
Umi no Nushi Tsuri: Takarajima ni Mukatte Original release date(s): JP: July 22, 1999	Notes: Developed by Pack-In-Video and published by Victor Interactive Software.; Literally translated into Legend of the Sea King: To Treasure Island.
Nushi Tsuri 64: Shiokaze Ninotte Original release date(s): JP: May 26, 2000	Release years by system: 2000—Nintendo 64
Nushi Tsuri 64: Shiokaze Ninotte Original release date(s): JP: May 26, 2000	Notes: Developed by Pack-In-Video and published by Victor Interactive Software.; It is the sequel to Nushi Tsuri 64.
Nushi Tsuri Adventure: Kite no Bouken Original release date(s): JP: August 4, 2000	Release years by system: 2000—Game Boy Color
Nushi Tsuri Adventure: Kite no Bouken Original release date(s): JP: August 4, 2000	Notes: Developed by Marvelous Interactive and published by Victor Interactive Software.

== See also ==
- Story of Seasons
