= GameFan =

Former video game magazine

- Cover of the first issue of GameFan by Terry Wolfinger
- Editor: Dave Halverson; David Hodgson; Eric Mylonas
- Categories: Gaming, Anime
- Frequency: Monthly
- First issue: October 1992
- Final issue Number: December 2000; Volume 8, Issue 12
- Company: DieHard Gamers Club (1992–1996); Metropolis Media (1996–1998); Shinno Media (1999–2000)
- Country: United States, Canada
- Language: English
- Website: gamefan.com (defunct)
- ISSN: 1092-7212

GameFan, originally Diehard GameFan, was a monthly magazine dedicated to video games and gaming culture created by Tim Lindquist, Greg Off, George Weising, and Dave Halverson. The first issue was published in September 1992. It provided coverage of both domestic and imported video games and was notable for its extensive use of game screenshots in its page design, which distinguished it from other U.S. publications at the time. The original magazine ceased operations in December 2000.

In April 2010, Halverson relaunched GameFan as a video game and film magazine. However, the relaunch was short-lived and suffered from internal conflicts and low advertising revenue.

== History ==
The idea for the name GameFan came from the Japanese Sega magazine called Megafan. Although it began as an advertising supplement to sell imported video games, primarily from Japan, the small text reviews and descriptions drew attention for a lack of refinement and a sense of passion. Editor profiles featured caricatures drawn by Terry Wolfinger. The anonymized approach allowed certain editors like Dave Halverson to write multiple reviews of the same game under different pseudonyms.

GameFan was well-known for its extensive coverage of important games and its expansive coverage of emerging interest in anime. Another major feature that separated it from other gaming magazines was the high-quality paper used to print it. GameFan's game screenshots were more colorful and accurate to in-game graphics.

By 2000, the magazine had a monthly print circulation of more than 100,000.

== Controversy ==
In the September 1995 issue of GameFan, an article was printed that contained several derogatory comments about Japanese people (calling them "little Jap bastards") as well as a self-degrading racial comment ("Us poor white trash from So CA"). The text took the place of one of the paragraphs of one of the sports game reviews. The article discussed a Namco combat flight simulator, Ace Combat, rather than College Football '96 (which was the topic of the article) and was poorly written.

GameFan's official explanation was that a rogue employee had sabotaged the magazine in order to alienate its Japanese audience and fan base. However, later reports indicated that it was actually filler text that someone had neglected to remove, and the entire incident was an internal joke that accidentally got printed. An apology (dated August 24, 1995) was published in DieHard GameFan's October 1995 issue in both English and Japanese.

== The Adventures of Monitaur ==
The magazine included a comic strip, The Adventures of Monitaur, an anime-derived series. Although the title character Monitaur was only drawn for the strip, the rest of the magazine's staff personae appeared as characters. Monitaur's main storylines were his struggles against The Blowmeister, who represented the leadership of rival magazines such as Electronic Gaming Monthly. In 1994, GameFan and two new startups, known as Dark Moon Productions and Dark Moon Comics, entered into an agreement to launch a Monitor comic book series, and at that time discussions were underway to make a full-length animated movie to be produced by Dark Moon Productions Inc and DMP Multi-media, a sister company founded by Andrew Spencer and Gary Tucker.

== Golden Megawards ==
The winners of GameFan's annual Golden Megawards were chosen by editors.

1992 Megawards
Award	Skid	Brody	Tom Slick	The Enquirer
Best Game	Wonderdog (Sega CD)	Cybernator (SNES)	Streets of Rage 2 (Genesis)	Street Fighter II (SNES)
Best Import Game	Landstalker (Mega Drive)	Parodius (Super Famicom)	Landstalker (Mega Drive)	Final Fantasy V (Super Famicom)
Best Arcade Translation	Street Fighter II			
Best Handheld Game	Shinobi 2	Dracula		Mario Land 2
Best Action Platform Game	Wonderdog	Sonic 2		World of Illusion
Best One-on-One Fighting Game	Art of Fighting			Street Fighter II
Best Action Fighting Game	TMNT: Hyperstone Heist	Streets of Rage 2		
Best Movie Game	Alien 3			Star Wars
Best Shooter	Air Zonk	Thunder Force IV		Space Megaforce
Best Cartoon Game	Taz-Mania	World of Illusion	Taz-Mania	World of Illusion
Best RPG	Soul Blazer	Zelda: A Link to the Past		
Best Puzzle Game	Q*bert 3	Lemmings	Krusty's Fun House	Q*bert 3
Best Simulation	Steel Talons		Battletank	Steel Talons
Best Sports Game	Baseball Stars 2	Madden '93	Baseball Stars 2	
Best Driving Game	Mario Kart	Top Racer	Mario Kart	
Best Strategy Game	Warsong	Rampart	Warsong	Rampart
Best Action Adventure	Legend of the Mystical Ninja	Cybernator	Prince of Persia	Legend of the Mystical Ninja
Best Sound Effects	Global Gladiators		Super Star Wars	
Best Intro	Wonderdog			Out of This World
Best Game Music	Wonderdog	Streets of Rage 2	Super Adventure Island	Legend of the Mystical Ninja
Best Music (Import Game)	Lunar; Fhey Area	Nobunaga's Ninja Force		Final Fantasy V
Best Character	Wonderdog (Wonderdog)	Cybernator (Cybernator)	Dhalsim (Street Fighter II)	Guile (Street Fighter II)
Best Boss	Smoke Ring Boss (Wonderdog)	Level 5 (Thunder Force IV)		Scaling Face (Mystical Ninja)
Best New Peripheral	Sega CD			
Worst Game	All THQ Games			

1993 Megawards
Award	Winner	Runners-up
Game of the Year	Gunstar Heroes (Genesis)	Star Fox (SNES); Landstalker (Genesis)
Best Action Platform Game	Gunstar Heroes (Genesis)	Tiny Toons (SNES)
Best Action/Adventure	Alien 3 (SNES)	Flashback (Genesis)
Best Fighting Game	Street Fighter II: Special Champion Edition (Genesis)	Street Fighter II Turbo (SNES)
Best Shooter	Silpheed (Sega CD)	Star Fox (SNES)
Best Action/Arcade Game	Batman Returns (SNES)	Final Fight CD (Sega CD)
Best Movie Game	Aladdin (Genesis)	Alien 3 (SNES)
Best Cartoon Game	Stimpy's Invention (Genesis)	Taz-Mania (SNES)
Best Puzzle Game	Mean Bean Machine (Genesis)	Lost Vikings (SNES)
Best Simulation	AH-3 Thunderhawk (Sega CD)	MechWarrior (SNES)
Best Strategy Game	Shining Force (Genesis)	King Arthur's World (SNES)
Best Action/RPG	Landstalker (Genesis)	Secret of Mana (SNES)
Best RPG	Lunar (Sega CD)	Paladin's Quest (SNES)
Best Driving Game	Crash & Burn (3DO)	Formula One (Genesis); Rock & Roll Racing (SNES)
Best 2 Player Game	Dashin' Desperadoes (Genesis)	Battletoads (SNES)
Most Innovative New Game	Landstalker (Genesis); Tax-Mania (SNES)	
Best Music	Lunar (Sega CD)	Star Fox (SNES); Gunstar Heroes (Genesis); Sonic CD (Mega CD)
Best New Character	Bubsy (Bubsy)	Aero (Aero); Sparkster (Rocket Knight Adventures)
Best System of '93	Sega Genesis	SNES
Best Handheld	Game Gear	
Best New System	Atari Jaguar	3DO

1994 Megawards
Award	Winner
Game of the Year	Earthworm Jim (Genesis)
Import Game of the Year	Clockwork Knight (Saturn)
Action/Platform Game of the Year	Earthworm Jim (Genesis)
Action/Adventure Game of the Year	Metroid (SNES)
Action/Arcade Game of the Year	Contra (Genesis)
Fighting Game of the Year	Super Street Fighter II Turbo (3DO)
Shooting Game of the Year	Novastorm (3DO)
Movie Game of the Year	Demolition Man (3DO)
Cartoon Game of the Year	Mickey Mania (Sega CD)
Simulation Game of the Year	Iron Soldier (Jaguar)
Strategy Game of the Year	Shining Force 2 (Genesis)
Role Playing Game of the Year	Final Fantasy III (SNES)
Action/RPG Game of the Year	Illusion of Gaia (SNES)
Driving/Racing Game of the Year	Road Rash (3DO)
Puzzle Game of the Year	Bubba 'n' Stix (Genesis)
Best Adventure/RPG	Snatcher (Sega CD)
Best 2 Player Game	Contra (Genesis); Eternal Champions (Sega CD); Super Street Fighter II (SNES)
Best Soundtrack	Earthworm Jim (Genesis)
Best Music	Final Fantasy III (SNES); Burning Soldier (3DO)
Best Special Effects	Castlevania: Bloodlines (Genesis); Donkey Kong Country (SNES); Guardian War (3DO)
Best FMV	Loadstar (Sega CD); Burning Soldier (3DO)
Best New Character	Earthworm Jim (Earthworm Jim)
Best New System	Sega 32X
Best System '94	Panasonic 3DO

1995 Megawards
Award	Winner	Import Megawards
Game of the Year	Yoshi's Island (SNES)	
16-Bit Game of the Year	Yoshi's Island (SNES)	
32-Bit Game of the Year	Jumping Flash! (PlayStation)	
SNES Game of the Year	Yoshi's Island	
Genesis Game of the Year	Vectorman	
PlayStation Game of the Year	Jumping Flash	
Saturn Game of the Year	Virtua Fighter 2	
3DO Game of the Year	D	
Portable Game of the Year	Red Alarm (Virtual Boy)	
Action Platform Game of the Year	Yoshi's Island (SNES)	Hermie Hopperhead (PlayStation)
Action Adventure Game of the Year	Skeleton Warriors	
Fighting Game of the Year	Virtua Fighter 2 (Saturn); Killer Instinct (SNES)	
Shooter of the Year	Panzer Dragoon (Saturn)	Darius Gaiden (Saturn)
Movie/Cartoon Port Game of the Year	Skeleton Warriors	
RPG of the Year	EarthBound (SNES)	Mystic Ark (Super Famicom)
Action RPG of the Year	Beyond Oasis (Genesis)	Tenchi Sozo (Super Famicom)
Racing Game of the Year	Sega Rally Championship (Saturn)	Motor Toon GP (PlayStation)
Puzzle Game of the Year	Zoop (PlayStation)	Puyo Puyo 2 (Saturn)
Simulation/Shooting Game of the Year	Warhawk (PlayStation)	
Strategy Game of the Year	Ogre Battle (SNES)	Tactics Ogre (Super Famicom)
Racing/Combat Games of the Year	Wipeout (PlayStation); Off-World Interceptor (Saturn)	
Graphic Adventure/FMV Games of the Year	The Mansion of Hidden Souls (Saturn); Discworld (PlayStation); D (3DO)	
Special Effects Game of the Year	Warhawk (PlayStation)	
Soundtrack of the Year	Skeleton Warriors	
New Character of the Year	Astal (Astal)	

1996 Megawards
Award	Winner(s)	Runners-up
Top GameFan Game of 1996	Tomb Raider	1. Resident Evil; 2. Super Mario 64; 3. Nights; 4. Tekken 2
Best Import Game of the Year	Enemy Zero	Keio Yu Gekitai
Coin-Op Game of the Year	Virtua Fighter 3	Street Fighter Alpha 2
16-Bit Game of the Year	Virtua Fighter 2 (Genesis)	Donkey Kong Country 3
Portable Game of the Year	Wario (Virtual Boy)	Red Alarm (Virtual Boy)
Alternative Game of the Year	Nights	Tail of the Sun
Side-Scrolling Game of the Year	Guardian Heroes	Metal Slug
Action/Platform Game of the Year	Crash Bandicoot	Pandemonium
Action/Adventure Game of the Year	Tomb Raider (PlayStation)	Super Mario 64
Action/RPG Game of the Year	The Legend of Oasis	Legacy of Kain
Corridor Game of the Year	PowerSlave (Saturn)	Final Doom
Shooting Game of the Year	Panzer Dragoon Zwei (Saturn)	Virtua Cop 2
Fighting Game of the Year	Street Fighter Alpha 2	Fighting Vipers
Racing Game of the Year	Ridge Racer Revolution, Wave Race 64	Jet Moto, Daytona CCE, Formula 1
Racing/Combat Game of the Year	Wipeout XL	Motor Toon GP, Wipeout (Saturn)
Puzzle Game of the Year	Tetris Attack (Super NES)	Puzzle Fighter
RPG Game of the Year	Suikoden	Super Mario RPG
Strategy Game of the Year	Return Fire (PlayStation)	Tecmo's Deception
Simulation Game of the Year	GunGriffon (Saturn)	Pilotwings 64
Best Sports Game of the Year	Worldwide Soccer '97 (Saturn)	Cool Boarders
Best Game Story of the Year	Suikoden	Legacy of Kain
Best Special Effects of the Year	Super Mario 64	Tomb Raider
Best Soundtrack of the Year	Suikoden	Tekken 2
Best Use of FMV/CG of the Year	Tekken 2	Legacy of Kain

== Related publications ==
GameFan's original editor-in-chief, Dave Halverson, went on to publish Gamers' Republic, and then Play Magazine (an American video-gaming magazine, not to be confused with the English publication of the same name), consisting mostly of former GameFan and Gamers' Republic staff members. Gamers' Republic had a run of 35 issues and ceased publication in July 2001 when the dot-com bubble burst. The Play had a more successful run of 97 issues until the publishing company filed for bankruptcy.

Tim Lindquist, along with several other members of the original GameFan team, launched a new magazine, Hardcore Gamer. They also began developing strategy guides as a part of their publishing company, DoubleJump Books (later renamed OnionBat Books). The magazine had a run of 36 issues before it began focusing exclusively on its website.

The DieHard GameFan name was resurrected by Alex Lucard as a website, Diehard GameFAN, with Halverson's blessing. While the site covers major game releases, the site also reviews indie games, much like the original magazine.

== 2010 relaunch ==
GameFan/MovieFan/Destructoid Magazine
- Editor: Dave Halverson; Wesley Ruscher; James Bacon; Brandon Justice
- Categories: Gaming, Movies, Comics, Anime, Manga
- Frequency: Inconsistent
- First issue: April 2010
- Final issue: July 2015 (Issue 11)
- Company: Paper Planet LLC
- Country: United States, Canada
- Language: English
- Website: http://gamefanmag.com (defunct)

After the bankruptcy of Fusion Publishing and the closure of Play, Dave Halverson began work on a relaunch of GameFan. The magazine returned to newsstands in April 2010, headed by Halverson and a few key staffers from Play, with Rob Duenas serving as the new art director. It was available in both print and digital formats, the latter of which was sold directly through GameFan's online shop.

The first two issues of the relaunched GameFan featured a section titled MovieFan, which covered movies, anime, and comics. The first two-thirds of the magazine was devoted to GameFan, and then readers would have to turn the magazine upside down in order to read the MovieFan magazine. As of issue 3, the MovieFan portion of the magazine was discontinued, but later issues still featured anime and comic reviews similar to Play. In its second and final issue, MovieFan conducted one of the last known interviews with the late filmmaker Satoshi Kon.

The first five issues of the magazine were released on a consistent bi-monthly schedule. However, problems occurred with the magazine's development due to issues with advertising revenue, causing the sixth issue to be released in August 2011, eight months after issue 5, and with an entirely new editing team, headed by newcomer James Bacon. Issue 7 was assembled by only three people – editor-in-chief Dave Halverson, art director and graphic designer Rob Duenas, and managing editor James Bacon – and was released in December 2011. Soon thereafter Duenas resigned. The reason for his departure was due to an overwhelming workload; Duenas stated that he worked "20 hours a day for two weeks straight and [he was] still short cover art". Despite the stressful working conditions, Duenas harbored no ill will towards Halverson or the magazine, stating that he would have still been willing to contribute with cover illustrations or provide assistance with layouts. Soon after Duenas' departure, Bacon left for reasons unstated.

A press release was issued on April 18, 2012, highlighting the supposed future of Paper Planet brands: GameFan and Girls of Gaming. The company planned on increasing its online presence through app development for mobile devices as well as a new GameFan TV online channel. None of these plans would come to fruition except the creation of a YouTube channel. Former Destructoid editor Wesley Ruscher was named the magazine's new editor-in-chief but resigned shortly after the release of issue 8, stating that it "lacked the necessities to keep food in [his] belly and a roof over [his] head."

As of June 2013, GameFan's web presence had been in a mostly inactive state for about a year. Issue 9 was finally made available in February 2013 after missing the holiday 2012 release. This issue was only worked on by two people, Dave Halverson and Greg Orlando. Issues 8 and 9 were only available in a digital format. GameFan later went on a two-year hiatus, returning in 2015 with a redesigned magazine and website. In February 2015, GameFan simultaneously released issue 10 digitally and on newsstands. The digital version was freely released on Magzter with the use of a promotional code. The magazine went through a complete overhaul, simplifying its layouts and design, most likely in order to have the magazines completed on schedule. The size of the print magazine is significantly smaller compared to previous issues. In addition, the GameFan mascot, Monitaur, and logo were redesigned.

On May 6, 2015, GameFan announced a partnership with Destructoid to help promote the GameFan brand with collaborations and free subscription offers. The initial plan was to bring back the dual-cover format from the first two issues, but instead of a MovieFan portion, it would be exclusive content created by Destructoid for the magazine. According to GameFan's official Facebook page, the deal with Destructoid would have allowed for the magazine to be released on a monthly schedule. However, the deal with Destructoid resulted in only one issue of the GameFan/Destructoid magazine ever being released. As of January 2019, there have been no new updates regarding GameFan's overall status.
