= Ultimate Air Combat =

1992 video game

Ultimate Air Combat Aces: Iron Eagle III
- European cover art
- Developer: Activision
- Publishers: NA: Activision; JP: Pack-In-Video
- Producer: Steven Ackrich
- Designer: Chris Shen
- Composer: Richard Miles Boogar
- Platform: Nintendo Entertainment System
- Release: NA: April 1992; JP: August 7, 1992; EU: November 11, 1992
- Genre: Flight simulator
- Mode: Single-player

Ultimate Air Combat (known as Aces: Iron Eagle III in Japan) is a semi-realistic combat flight simulator developed and published by Activision for the Nintendo Entertainment System. Having relatively good graphics for the console, Ultimate Air Combat differs from other similar games by having both a cockpit view and an isometric view throughout the missions. The game seems to be set in the near future due to some of the highly advanced weapons systems but modern-day planes. In Japan, the game is known as Aces: Iron Eagle III and is barely based on the film of the same name (as both involved aircraft).

== Story ==
The story begins when the White House calls an emergency meeting, where they reveal that the military dictator Don Gwano is using the high revenue from his large oil exports to fund his large army and navy. He is now attacking neighbouring countries and the president's military advisers have agreed that action needs to be taken. Rather than a full-scale invasion, they propose a tactic of quick lightning strikes to take out specific systems vital to Don Gwano's militaristic regime. As the top pilot in the military, the player is chosen to perform these attacks.

== Gameplay ==
In flight screenshot of the F14 cockpit

Ultimate Air Combat has thirty-seven different missions (nine groups of four missions then the final, slightly longer mission). Each mission is grouped into two parts. The first part of the mission has the player flying to the destination from the view of the pilot, within the cockpit. In this mode, the player will receive helpful information from the co-pilot such as when damage has been inflicted, when danger of stalling the plane and when an enemy plane is spotted. After destroying three enemy planes the mission moves onto the second half of the mission. This half of the mission is from an isometric view of the plane and the surrounding area where the player completes the actual mission target, usually destroying a particular structure or structures. The aircraft has limited fuel, though a fuel tank can be added at the weapon selection screen for more fuel to allow for a longer time to complete the mission.

If the aircraft being piloted is destroyed by enemy fire, crashes into the sea or runs out of fuel, the pilot survives but the plane being piloted is crashed and unable to be flown again at any further point in the game, so in essence, the player has three lives throughout the game.

== Aircraft ==
Three aircraft are available to pilot within the game: F14 Tomcat, F18 Super Hornet, Harrier. The cockpit layout is slightly different within each plane. Each plane has its own specific weapon later in the game and some other weapons are available for a specific plane or planes. Also there are minor differences in handling, the Harrier being notably easier to control during the first part of a mission where the player's view is from within the cockpit.

== Weapons ==
Professor Newron updates the planes, either by adding new weapons systems or by adding new hard points to allow more weapons to be loaded onto the plane. There are 13 different weapons (not including the fuel tank and machine gun), and some of these are available to all planes while others are plane-specific. As the player completes more missions, more weapons are developed and the finite number of weapons load points are increased.
