= Pack-In-Video =

Japanese video game company

- Native name: 株式会社パック・イン・ビデオ
- Romanized name: Kabushiki-gaisha Pakku-In-Bideo
- Industry: video game industry
- Founded: August 3, 1970
- Defunct: October 1, 1996
- Fate: Merged with Victor Entertainment
- Successor: Victor Interactive Software
- Headquarters: Shibuya, Tokyo, Japan
- Key people: Yasuhiro Wada

Pack-In-Video Co., Ltd. (株式会社パック・イン・ビデオ, Kabushiki-gaisha Pakku-In-Bideo) was a Japanese video game publisher and video distributor. The games published were mostly focused on the Japanese market although a few titles have been published abroad.

== History ==
Pack-In-Video was founded on August 3, 1970.

In October 1996, the company was merged with the video game division of Victor Entertainment and became Victor Interactive Software.

== Videos ==
- Satsujin Kippu wa Heart-iro
- Dokudami Tenement
- Ninja Ryukenden
- Humanoid Monster Bem
- Love Potion: Halley Densetsu
- Record of Lodoss War: Special Edition
- The Laughing Salesman

== Games ==
Title	Platform(s)	Release date
Rambo	MSX	December 5, 1985
Super Rambo	MSX, X1, PC-9801	June 21, 1986
Super Rambo Special	MSX	November 21, 1986
Space Camp	MSX	November 21, 1986
Young Sherlock: The Legacy of Doyle	MSX	March 21, 1987
Labyrinth	MSX	August 21, 1987
Batman	MSX	September 21, 1987
Family Billiards	MSX	November 21, 1987
Rambo	Famicom	December 4, 1987
Gunjin-Shogi	MSX	December 16, 1987
L'Affaire...	MSX	December 16, 1987
Predator	MSX	March 5, 1988
Predator	Famicom	March 10, 1988
Champion Yosuke-Ide's Mah-Jong	MSX	April 5, 1988
Sylviana	FDS	August 10, 1988
Sylviana	MSX	September 15, 1989
Knight Rider	Famicom	September 30, 1988
F-1 Pilot	PC Engine	March 23, 1989
Deep Blue Kaitei Shinwa	PC Engine	March 31, 1989
Putt Putt Golf	FDS	March 31, 1989
The Golf	MSX	May 25, 1989
Faria: Fuuin no Tsurugi	Famicom	July 21, 1989
Thunderbirds	Famicom	September 30, 1989
Kattobi! Douji	FDS	October 20, 1989
Mirai Senshi: Lios	Famicom	December 1, 1989
The Golf Course Shuu	MSX	December 10, 1989
Knight Rider Special	PC Engine	December 22, 1989
Formation Armed F	PC Engine CD-ROM²	March 23, 1990
Trump Boy	Game Boy	March 28, 1990
Formation Armed F	PC Engine	March 30, 1990
Lode Runner: Lost Labyrinth	PC Engine	July 27, 1990
Kawa no Nushi Tsuri	Famicom	August 10, 1990
Bakushō! Star Monomane Shitennō	Famicom	September 14, 1990
Lunar Lander	Game Boy	September 21, 1990
Die Hard	PC Engine	September 28, 1990
Trump Boy II	Game Boy	November 9, 1990
Zipang	PC Engine	December 14, 1990
Jigoku Gokuraku Maru	Famicom	December 21, 1990
Gulclight TDF 2	PC Engine CD-ROM²	January 25, 1991
Road Spirits	PC Engine CD-ROM²	March 22, 1991
Die Hard	Famicom	July 19, 1991
Power Gate	PC Engine	August 30, 1991
Super Metal Crusher	PC Engine	November 29, 1991
Hihou Densetsu Chris no Bouken	PC Engine CD-ROM²	December 13, 1991
Minesweeper	Game Boy	December 13, 1991
Hawk F-123	PC Engine CD-ROM²	March 13, 1992
Minesweeper	PC Engine CD-ROM²	March 20, 1992
Kawa no Nushi Tsuri: Shizenha	PC Engine CD-ROM²	March 27, 1992
Terminator 2	Famicom	June 26, 1992
Super Off Road	Super Famicom	July 3, 1992
Aces: Iron Eagle 3	Famicom	August 7, 1992
Amazing Tennis	Super Famicom	December 18, 1992
Super Soukoban	Super Famicom	January 29, 1993
Super Battletank	Super Famicom	April 23, 1993
Go! Go! Dodge League	Super Famicom	September 24, 1993
Metal Angel	PC Engine CD-ROM²	September 24, 1993
Final Knockout	Super Famicom	November 5, 1993
Aurora Quest: Otaku no Seiza in Another World	PC Engine CD-ROM²	December 10, 1993
Ramos Ruy no World Wide Soccer	Super Famicom	February 25, 1994
Auto Crusher Palladium	PC Engine CD-ROM²	February 25, 1994
Gambler Jiko Chuushinha 2: Dorapon Quest	Super Famicom	March 18, 1994
Super Battletank 2	Super Famicom	May 27, 1994
Yamaneko Bubsy no Daibouken	Super Famicom	June 17, 1994
KO Seiki Beast Sanjuushi: Gaia Fukkatsu Kanketsuhen	PC Engine CD-ROM²	June 17, 1994
Super Dogfight	Super Famicom	June 24, 1994
Burning Soldier	3DO	June 25, 1994
Tsuri Tarou	Super Famicom	July 8, 1994
Tsuri Tarou	Super Famicom	August 30, 1996 (Reprint)
Multi Play Volleyball	Super Famicom	October 28, 1994
Vortex	Super Famicom	December 9, 1994
Ski Paradise with Snowboard	Super Famicom	December 16, 1994
Metal Angel 2	PC Engine CD-ROM²	January 20, 1995
Iron Commando: Koutetsu no Senshi	Super Famicom	February 10, 1995
Magical Pop'n	Super Famicom	March 10, 1995
The Atlas: Renaissance Voyager	Super Famicom	March 24, 1995
Kawa no Nushi Tsuri 2	Super Famicom	April 28, 1995
Kawa no Nushi Tsuri 2	Super Famicom	August 30, 1996 (Reprint)
Nekketsu Legend Baseballer	PC Engine CD-ROM²	June 16, 1995
Trump Island	Super Famicom	June 23, 1995
Scramble Cobra	3DO	August 11, 1995
AIII S.V.: A Ressha de Ikou 3 Super Version	Super Famicom	September 29, 1995
Virtual Fishing	Virtual Boy	October 6, 1995
Majo-tachi no Nemuri	Super Famicom	November 24, 1995
Moon Cradle	3DO	December 15, 1995
Wangan Dead Heat	Sega Saturn	December 15, 1995
Battle Submarine	Super Famicom	December 22, 1995
Isozuri: Ritou Hen	Super Famicom	January 19, 1996
Isozuri: Ritou Hen	Super Famicom	August 30, 1996 (Reprint)
Pinball Graffiti	Sega Saturn	July 12, 1996
Umi no Nushi Tsuri	Super Famicom	July 19, 1996
Bokujo Monogatari	Super Famicom	August 9, 1996
Wangan Dead Heat + Real Arrange	Sega Saturn	August 30, 1996
Monstania	Super Famicom	September 27, 1996
