= Scramble Cobra =

1995 video game

- North American cover art
- Developer: Genki Co., Ltd.
- Publishers: 3DO: JP: Pack-In-Video; NA: Panasonic Software Company
- Directors: Yoshinari Sunazuka; Yasuki Ohno
- Producers: Manami Kuroda; Seiichi Kizu
- Designers: Hiroshi Hamagaki; Mika Urushiyama; Takashi Isoko
- Programmer: Kazuyuki Kodama
- Artist: Chiho Tomita
- Composers: Masato Matsuda; Shigeo Fuchino
- Platform: 3DO
- Release: JP: 11 August 1995; NA: 1995
- Genre: Combat flight simulator
- Mode: Single-player

Scramble Cobra (Note: Japanese: スクランブル コブラ, Hepburn: Sukuranburu Kobura) is a 1995 video game developed by Genki/Pack-In-Video and published by Panasonic, released on 3DO.

== Gameplay ==
Gameplay screenshot.

Scramble Cobra is a 32-bit game in which the player pilots a Bell AH-1 Cobra on 10 missions, and the game features three difficulty settings. The main plot of the game is about the invasion of K by the empire of R. Each mission has a time limit of 8 minutes, so if you were to complete them all in 1 try, it would take almost an hour to finish the game.

== Reception ==
Reception

Review scores
Publication	Score
Electronic Gaming Monthly	19.5/40
GamePro	14/20
Next Generation	2/5
3DO Magazine	3/5
MAN!AC	61%
Power Unlimited	53/100
Strana Igr	4/10
Video Games	45%

According to Famitsu, Scramble Cobra sold a total of nearly 9,000 copies in Japan. Next Generation reviewed the 3DO version of the game, rating it two stars out of five, and stated that "you have an overall experience that isn't even bad enough to be painful, just dull." Retrovideogamer rated the game 4/10, saying "Boring, shallow gameplay and poor presentation mean Scramble Cobra is one to miss."
