= Car Battler Joe =

2001 video game

- North American cover art
- Developer: Ancient
- Publisher: Natsume Inc.: JP: Victor Interactive Software
- Director: Keisuke Miyanaga
- Producer: Koichiro Nakamura
- Programmer: Kazutoyo Kobayashi
- Artist: Ayano Koshiro
- Composer: Yuzo Koshiro
- Platform: Game Boy Advance
- Release: JP: November 30, 2001; NA: October 21, 2002
- Genre: Vehicular combat
- Modes: Single-player, multiplayer

Car Battler Joe (Note: Japanese: 激闘！カーバトラーGO！！, Hepburn: Gekitou! Car Battler Go!!) is a 2001 vehicular combat game developed by Ancient and published by Natsume Inc. for the Game Boy Advance. The game involves using cars to fight opponents in action-styled battles, with role-playing video game game mechanics. It combined vehicular combat game with action role-playing elements in a similar manner to Autoduel from 1985.

== Plot ==
Gameplay screenshot

The player, taking the role of 16-year-old Joe, must earn money by battling to buy parts for his car to make it stronger.

== Development ==
The game was developed by Ancient, with joint publishing by Victor Interactive Software in Japan and Natsume Inc. in the United States. Known in Japan as Car Battler Go, Natsume Inc. secured the North American publishing rights for the game, changing its name and originally scheduled its release in mid-2002. Composer Yuzo Koshiro wrote funk music for the game. It was shown at Nintendo Space World in 2001. In 2015, the game was re-released for the Wii U's Virtual Console.

== Reception ==
Reception

Aggregate score
Aggregator	Score
Metacritic	77/100

Review scores
Publication	Score
Electronic Gaming Monthly	7/10
GamePro	4/5
GameSpot	8.1/10
GameSpy	3/5
IGN	7.7/10
Nintendo Life	7/10
Nintendo Power	4.3/5

Car Battler Joe received "generally favorable reviews" according to the review aggregation website Metacritic. It was well received by Nintendo Power, which called it a "one-of-a-kind adventure" due to its combination of driving challenges and "RPG depth". Before it was playable, Marc Nix of IGN was excited about its premise, as well as the developer attached to it. In his review, he called its gameplay "hectic" and its controls well-designed. He also enjoyed the Mode 7 graphics. However, he found the sound to be less desirable, calling it "busy" but also "lacking punch". It was the 87th most anticipated game for IGN's readers as of January 3, 2003.

Electronic Gaming Monthly praised the car customization, commenting that without it, it would be both mediocre and not as deep. GameSpot's Frank Provo called it "weird and unique", and may not suit some people's tastes. However, he found an abundance of variety and personality to it. The publication later named it the best Game Boy Advance game of February 2003. In his preview of the game, GamePro's Pong Sifu found the gameplay unique and the graphics "delightful". In his review, he commented that while the story was weak and the concept unoriginal, it was "easily one of the most fun action RPGs on the portable system". RPGFan's Neal Chandran found it fun and worth a shot, noting that even with its flaws, its "charm and heart" won him over. GameSpy's Zach Meston called it "unexpectedly entertaining", praising its customization and music and sound effects. However, he criticized the aiming system and storyline, the latter described as "bare-minum".

Retrospectives on Car Battler Joe were also positive towards the game. Outlets such as GamesRadar and Den of Geek listed it as one of the best games for the Game Boy Advance.
