= Dynamite Boxing =

1998 sports video game

- Japanese cover art
- Developer: Victor Interactive Software
- Publishers: JP: Victor Interactive Software; EU: JVC Music Europe; NA: Sony Computer Entertainment
- Platform: PlayStation
- Release: JP: May 21, 1998; EU: October 1998; NA: January 12, 1999
- Genre: Sports
- Mode: Single-player

Dynamite Boxing (ダイナマイトボクシング, Dainamaito Bokushingu), known as Victory Boxing 2 in Europe and Contender in North America, is a boxing video game developed and published by Victor Interactive Software for the PlayStation. It was released by JVC Music Europe in Europe and Sony Computer Entertainment in North America. It was followed by a sequel, Contender 2.

== Reception ==
Reception

Aggregate score
Aggregator	Score
GameRankings	62%

Review scores
Publication	Score
AllGame	2.5/5
CNET Gamecenter	6/10
Electronic Gaming Monthly	6.125/10 (Note: In Electronic Gaming Monthly's review of the game, one critic gave it 5.5/10, two others gave it each a score of 7/10, and another gave it 5/10.)
Famitsu	21/40
Game Informer	6.75/10
GamePro	4/5 (Note: GamePro gave the game two 3.5/5 scores for graphics and sound, and two 4/5 scores for control and overall fun factor.)
GameRevolution	C
GameSpot	6.6/10
IGN	3/10
Next Generation	1/5
Official U.S. PlayStation Magazine	4/5
The Cincinnati Enquirer	2/4

The game received mixed reviews according to the review aggregation website GameRankings. Next Generation said, "From the uninspired graphics to the sloppy and ill-thought-out gameplay, there is nothing in Contender that stands out as being particularly good and quite a bit that is actually painful to experience. Sony should be ashamed of inflicting this abomination on the gaming public." In Japan, Famitsu gave it a score of 21 out of 40.
