= Formation Armed F =

1988 video game

- Arcade flyer
- Developer: Nichibutsu
- Publisher: Nichibutsu: JP: Pack-In-Video (PC Engine)
- Designer: Takanori Tanaka
- Composer: Kenji Yoshida
- Platforms: Arcade, PC Engine
- Release: JP: August 1988; PC Engine: JP: 1990
- Genre: Scrolling shooter
- Modes: Single-player, multiplayer

Formation Armed F (Note: Japanese: フォーメーション アームドエフ, Hepburn: Fōmēshon Āmudo F) is a vertically scrolling shooter developed and published by Nichibutsu. It was released in 1988 as an arcade video game in Japan. A PC Engine port wasd published in 1990 by Pack-In-Video.

Hamster Corporation acquired the rights to the game alongside Nichibutsu's intellectual property, releasing the game as part of their Arcade Archives series for the PlayStation 4 in 2016 and Nintendo Switch in 2019 as simply Armed F.

== Gameplay ==
Arcade screenshot

The player controls a spacecraft called the Vowger and shoots enemies, collects power-ups and attempts to defeat bosses to advance levels. The Vowger can be changed to shoot in a multitude of formations and directions.
