= The Black Bass (1984 video game) =

1984 video game

- MSX cover art
- Developer: Gamu
- Publishers: Hot B, Gamu
- Series: The Black Bass
- Platforms: MSX, Family Computer
- Release: PC-88; August 1984; MSX; 1986; Famicom; February 6, 1987
- Genre: Fishing
- Mode: Single-player

The Black Bass (ザ・ブラックバス, Za Burakku Basu) is a 1984 fishing video game developed and published by Gamu (later known as HOT・B). It was released for the PC-88 in 1984; a version for the Family Computer was released on March 18, 1987, in Japan. It is the first game in The Black Bass series and was not released outside of Japan.

== Gameplay ==
The objective is for the player to catch as many black bass as possible from sunrise to sunset. The player may select a beginner's game or ranking game. A ranking game requires a password. From here, a player may select a location on the lake to start at and begin fishing. Simply tossing a lure out with the desired power will start the process. A fish can be lured in by moving the lure around and if it bites, then the player can try reeling it in. Too much constant reeling leads to the line breaking and the loss of both the fish and the lure.

Between casting rounds, the player can make certain selections. Among the selections available is the option to change the type and or color of lure being used.

== Legacy ==
The Black Bass was the first in a series of games:

- The Black Bass (USA) (known in Japan as The Black Bass II) (1989)
- The Blue Marlin (1991)
- Super Black Bass (1992)
- Black Bass: Lure Fishing (Game Boy: 1994 / Game Boy Color: 1999)
- Bassin's Black Bass with Hank Parker (known in Japan as Super Black Bass 2) (SNES: 1994 / PC: 2000)
- Super Black Bass 3 (1995)
- Bass Fishing Tatsujin Techou (1996)
- Super Black Bass Pocket 2
- Big Bass World Championship (known in Japan as Super Black Bass X)(1997)
- TNN Outdoors Fishing Champ (known in Japan as Super Black Bass 3) (1998)
- Black Bass with Blue Marlin (known in Japan as Super Black Bass X2 & Blue Marlin; both were later released separately) (1999)
- Super Black Bass: Real Fight (1999)
- American Bass Challenge (known in Japan as Super Black Bass Advance) (2001)
- Fishing Fantasy: BuzzRod (known in Japan as BuzzRod: Fighting Fantasy) (2005)
- Super Black Bass Fishing (known in Japan as Super Black Bass: Dynamic Shot) (2005)
- Professional Fisherman's Tour: Northern Hemisphere (known in Japan as Super Black Bass: Kitahankyuu o Tsuru) (2007)
- Super Black Bass: 3D Fight (2011)
