= Bakushō! Star Monomane Shitennō =

1990 video game

- Developer: Pack-In-Video
- Publisher: Pack-In-Video
- Platform: Family Computer
- Release: JP: September 14, 1990
- Genre: Board game
- Modes: Single-player, multiplayer

Bakushō! Star Monomane Shitennō (爆笑! スターものまね四天王; "A Hearty Laugh! Imitation of the Four Heavenly Kings Star") is a Nintendo Family Computer life simulation video game that portrays the life of either a musician or a famous performer of the monomane (模倣; "imitation") style of Japanese theatre. The object is to gain popularity while performing concert tours through the fictional city. Celebrity challenges are included in the game; they are considered to be miniature games like swimming and kicking a giant ball into a goal in a manner similar to soccer. While these games are fun to play, losing results in a loss of popularity points similar to performing terribly at a concert.

== Gameplay ==
These performers are out trying to get gigs (singing jobs) at the local venues.

Appeasing senior citizens by performing gigs at the nursing home is another way to gain popularity. Otherwise, they will criticize the player's music or theatre styles. After gaining the respect of the elderly, the mad faces turn into frowns, and eventually smiles. Television appearances come in the form of talent shows, televised concerts, and several other surprises. The goal is to convert all stadiums and concert venues to the player's colors. In addition to popularity meters for the players, music styles have their own popularity meters. Smiles with the player's colors determine which music styles are best liked by the player's fans. This determine what music or theatre styles to play and which ones to avoid in certain concert venues.

In the talent contest, the show is like a tournament where four people compete in a semi-final format. After the judges give their scores, the two players with the lowest scores are eliminated. The players with the highest scores end up competing in a final round where the highest scoring player is the winner and receives popularity points. During the performance, the player chooses a musical style or styles and must improvise the lyrics. During a televised concert, the game proceeds like in a normal concert. The only difference is that an increased number of popularity points are rewarded for a successful concert.

== Element of luck ==
After drawing a certain combination on the dice, the player must go to a nursing home and impress a grandmother with a musical or theatre performance. If the player can impress the grandmother, then the player is accepted more by the elderly people, but the elderly people can get grumpy again if the player makes the grandmother angry each time the player has to perform at the nursing home again. All the text in the game is in Japanese. Other combinations of the letter and number dice can create or ruin a player's popularity along with other side effects.

The dice combination "A-1" is the best combination and it causes a rapid rise in popularity, which means more fans show up to the lucky person's concerts. Getting an "F-5" is the worst combination and will result in a loss of popularity, but all other combinations can have negative, neutral, or positive results for the player. Guessing about the result of the dice throw is all the fun of trying to get popularity for the band and greater appreciation from different age groups.
