= Reveal Fantasia =

2002 video game

- Developer(s): Infinity Co., Ltd.
- Publisher(s): Victor Interactive Software
- Platform(s): PlayStation 2
- Release: JP: 20 February 2002
- Genre(s): Role playing, Fantasy
- Mode(s): Single-player

Reveal Fantasia: Mariel to Yousei Monogatari (リーヴェルファンタジア～マリエルと妖精物語～, Rīveru Fantajia: Marieru to Yousei Monogatari) is a Fantasy role playing video game released in 2002 for the PlayStation 2 console by Victor Interactive Software, Inc. in Japan. The game involved an innovative concept of a role playing game involving no battles or fighting. Its game play shows some influence from dating simulation games. The game was never released outside Japan.

Victor's official page described the game as a "Heart Warming RPG" The storyline has many humorous sections, as well as plenty of "tear jerker" dramatic scenes. The visual style, music and characters have been widely described as "cute" and the game is arguably aimed at female gamers.

In terms of gameplay, Reveal Fantasia consists mostly of fetch quests and has elements of platform gaming. The game has been criticized for being overly difficult toward the later stages.
