= Reel Fishing =

Photograph of the three Reel Fishing games and fission fishing controller released for the PlayStation and PlayStation 2 consoles

Reel Fishing is a series of fishing video games by Natsume Inc. The first game, Reel Fishing, was released for the PlayStation in 1996. Originally a localization of Victor Interactive Software's (now Marvelous Interactive) Fish Eyes series from Japan, Natsume Inc. has since diverged from that series to create their own games.

== Series ==
There are several games in the series. The first two games, Reel Fishing (released in 1996) and Reel Fishing II (released in 2000) appeared on the PlayStation. They were followed by Reel Fishing III in 2003 on the PlayStation 2. A special fishing reel controller was released with the first game that was also compatible with the sequels. The first game was successful enough to reach "Greatest Hits" status.

Reel Fishing: Wild was released for the Dreamcast in 2001, making it the first non-Sony entry of the series. In 2006, Natsume Inc. released Reel Fishing: Life & Nature and Reel Fishing: The Great Outdoors for the handheld PlayStation Portable. Reel Fishing: Life & Nature was also planned for the Nintendo DS, but was canceled. Two installments for the Wii, Reel Fishing: Angler's Dream and Reel Fishing Challenge (the latter on WiiWare) were released in 2009.

== Games ==
Title	Year	Platforms
Reel Fishing	1996	PlayStation, PlayStation Network
Reel Fishing II	2000	PlayStation
Reel Fishing: Wild	2001	Dreamcast
Reel Fishing III	2003	PlayStation 2
Reel Fishing: The Great Outdoors	2006	PlayStation Portable
Reel Fishing: Life & Nature	Cancelled	Nintendo DS
Reel Fishing: Angler's Dream	2009	Wii
Reel Fishing Challenge	2009	WiiWare
Reel Fishing Challenge II	2010	WiiWare
Reel Fishing Paradise 3D	2011	Nintendo 3DS
Reel Fishing: Ocean Challenge	2012	WiiWare
Reel Fishing Pocket	2013	iOS
Reel Fishing Paradise 3D Mini	2013	Nintendo eShop
Reel Fishing Pocket 2: Ocean	2014	iOS
Reel Fishing: Master's Challenge	2015	PlayStation Vita
Reel Fishing: Road Trip Adventure	2019	PlayStation 4; Nintendo Switch; PC
Reel Fishing: Days of Summer	2024	PlayStation 5; Nintendo Switch; PC; Nintendo Switch 2

=== Reel Fishing ===
Reel Fishing
- Developer: Victor Interactive Software
- Publishers: JP: Victor Interactive Software; WW: Natsume Inc.
- Platforms: PlayStation, PlayStation Network
- Release: JP: October 10, 1996; NA: 1997; EU: 1998; EU: March 28, 2008 (PSN); NA: November 25, 2009 (PSN)
- Genre: Fishing
- Mode: Single player

Reel Fishing (known as Fish Eyes in Japan) is the first in the Reel Fishing series of fishing video games. It was released on the PlayStation. It was published by Natsume Inc.

When hooking a fish, the player must wait until its mouth has completely covered the hook, then hit the reel button to set the hook. Once the hook is set, the player can reel it in. If the player reels when the fish is resisting, there is a greater chance of the line snapping and of the player losing the fish. When the fish is speeding away and then slows, the fish has a lesser chance of resisting. One a fish is caught, the player can put it into their personal aquarium, in which the fish can be fed and raised.

==== Reception ====
Reception

Review scores
Publication	Score
Electronic Gaming Monthly	6.5/10
GameSpot	1.4/10
IGN	6/10

Reel Fishing received mediocre reviews. While most critics were pleased with the graphics, most also found that the gameplay's combination of slow pacing with excessively high difficulty removed the motivation to keep playing. IGN's Jay Boor said he couldn't catch any fish at all, and that the persistent lack of payoff for one's efforts makes the game too frustrating. GamePro said the game has a good amount of strategy involved, requiring players to learn about individual species, but concluded it would only appeal to fishing enthusiasts.

The four reviewers of Electronic Gaming Monthly were somewhat divided. Lead reviewer Sushi-X found that the fish are very easy to hook and extremely difficult to reel in, a combination he regarded as both frustrating and blatantly unrealistic. His three co-reviewers, however, all gave it a moderate recommendation, praising the atmosphere and the aquarium. Josh Smith completely panned the game in GameSpot, ridiculing the appearance of the mixed media interface, the way the fish jerks between its limited animations, and the interminable length of the later levels. However, his primary criticism was how the fish always move and react the same way, requiring the player to perform the same excessively difficult timed inputs every time. He summed up, "Primarily FMV-driven, with otherwise stupid, deficient graphics, and perhaps the most repetitive gameplay to ever retard the potential of the PlayStation, Reel Fishing is really a dog."

=== Reel Fishing II ===
Reel Fishing II
- Developer: Victor Interactive Software
- Publishers: JP: Victor Interactive Software; NA: Natsume Inc.; PAL: Natsume Inc.
- Platform: PlayStation
- Release: JP: January 27, 2000; NA: June 14, 2000; PAL: October 6, 2000

Reel Fishing II (known as Fish Eyes II in Japan) is the final Reel Fishing game on the PlayStation. It was published by Victor Interactive Software. It features 19 levels and tons of different types of fish.

The main menu gives an options menu, Free mode, and Season mode. The game menu is the Aqua Lodge, in which the player may view records, tackle, and a fishing magazine which gives monthly tips and news. In the tank room, the player can care for and watch caught fish. Gameplay consists of a full motion video background and a point of view from the boat. The player may cast anywhere into the play area, but may not move. Some areas may have different spots with different assortments of "hotspots" and a different current. Once a fish has "bitten," the screen shifts to an 3d underwater view and the player must either entice the fish using a lure, or wait for fish to arrive using bait. The hook must be set at the right time, and the fish must be fought to the surface. At the time it reaches the surface, it is automatically brought onto the shore and size is calculated.

Reel Fishing II contains two modes of fishing: "Season," and "Free." In "Season" mode, the player starts with two areas available, Ocean Variety and Carp fishing, but will unlock more. Time progresses in months, and the player is limited on time during fishing. Players unlock new areas by meeting the goals of unlocked areas. Tackle is unlocked upon each visit. In "Free" mode, the player can fish in any unlocked area with any unlocked tackle. There is no time limit, and the month can be selected before fishing. As there are no goals, nothing can be unlocked. Scores will still be kept.

=== Reel Fishing: Wild ===
Reel Fishing: Wild (known as Fish Eyes: Wild in Japan) is a Reel Fishing video game for the Sega Dreamcast. It was published by Victor Interactive Software. It features 14 levels and a fairly wide variety of fish, including a yellow piranha. While gameplay is similar to Reel Fishing II, there is no Season or Free to compete and locations can be chosen at any time of day without restrictions. It also has a smoother 60 FPS unlike the two previous games. Unlike both Reel Fishing games, players cannot keep caught fish in tanks as caught fishes are always released back into the water.

=== Reel Fishing III ===
Reel Fishing III
- Developer: Victor Interactive Software
- Publishers: JP: Victor Interactive Software; NA/EU: Natsume Inc.
- Platform: PlayStation 2
- Release: JP: June 26, 2003; PAL: September 5, 2003; NA: September 11, 2003

Reel Fishing III (known as Fish Eyes 3 in Japan) is a fishing game for the PlayStation 2 platform. It was published by Victor Interactive Software. The story is about a man and his dog. You get a letter from your friend from your childhood. He says that he will be going out of town for a bit and requests that you look over his lodge, named "The Aqua Lodge". You eventually befriend a dog and find pages of your friend's journal as a reward for accomplishing fishing goals. Reel Fishing III is based around freshwater fishing. Unlike Reel Fishing II, players are restricted to fish in freshwater, as to make the story feel more realistic. It ranges from bass fishing, trout fishing, mountain fishing, stream fishing and many more.

=== Angler's Dream ===
Reel Fishing: Angler's Dream
- Developer: Marvelous Entertainment
- Publishers: JP: Marvelous Entertainment; NA: Natsume Inc.; PAL: Zushi Games, Funbox Media
- Platform: Wii
- Release: JP: April 30, 2009; NA: August 31, 2009; EU: February 12, 2010
- Modes: Single-player, Multiplayer

Reel Fishing: Angler's Dream, known in Japan as Fish Eyes Wii, is a fishing video game for the Wii platform. It was released on April 30, 2009 in Japan and in North America on August 25, 2009. The game is part of the Reel Fishing series of games. Owners of Angler's Dream will be able to unlock extra content in the WiiWare game Reel Fishing Challenge.

=== Reel Fishing Challenge ===
Reel Fishing Challenge
- Developer: Marvelous Entertainment
- Publishers: WW: Natsume Inc.; JP: Marvelous Entertainment
- Platform: WiiWare
- Release: NA: June 29, 2009; JP: July 14, 2009; PAL: February 26, 2010
- Mode: Single-player

Reel Fishing Challenge (Fish Eyes Challenge in Japan) is a WiiWare fishing video game by Natsume Inc. It was released in North America on June 29, 2009 and later in Japan on July 14, 2009 and the PAL region on February 26, 2010. The game is part of the Reel Fishing series of games. Owners of the Wii game Reel Fishing: Angler's Dream will be able to unlock extra content including additional fish and challenges in Reel Fishing Challenge. Players catch fish by making a casting motion with the Wii Remote to cast their line, and shaking the Nunchuk to reel it back in. Once they have a hooked a fish, they must follow a series of prompts to make the catch. Players can also alter their gear to help lure specific types of fish. The game features a free play mode and a challenge mode that revolves around completing objectives set within a time limit. Nintendo Life believed the game to be shallow compared to other games in the genre.

=== Paradise 3D ===
Reel Fishing Paradise 3D
- Developer: Natsume Inc.
- Publishers: NA: Natsume Inc.; PAL: Funbox Media
- Platform: Nintendo 3DS
- Release: June 28, 2011
- Mode: Single-player

Reel Fishing Paradise 3D is a fishing video game developed and published by Natsume Inc. as part of the Reel Fishing franchise for the Nintendo 3DS.

A player casting a line in Reel Fishing Paradise 3D

Gameplay, like other games in the fishing simulator genre consists of casting a line from a fishing pole to reel in fish. In the game, the player casts the line and reels in fish with the touch screen. Whether or not a player can catch a fish usually depends on timing and the placement of the tackle. The game includes multiple fishing techniques, including bait fishing as well as fly fishing. The game also includes 15 stages, 40 fish, and over 100 pieces of tackle. Players can also keep caught fish in a fish tank for display.

Reception, though minimal has been universally mixed. Nintendo Gamer gave the game a 6.5/10, calling it a "A pleasant fishing sim." [March 2012, p. 101] Nintendo Power gave the game a 6/10 and stated "We recommend a catch-and-release approach to Reel Fishing Paradise 3D; it probably isn't destined for your trophy wall." [July 2011, p. 89]
