= Victor Interactive Software =

Japanese video game company

- Predecessor: Pack-In-Video
- Founded: October 1, 1996
- Defunct: March 31, 2003
- Fate: Merged with Marvelous Entertainment
- Successor: Marvelous Interactive
- Headquarters: Shibuya, Tokyo, Japan
- Owner: Victor Company of Japan
- Parent: Victor Entertainment

Victor Interactive Software, Inc. (株式会社ビクターインタラクティブソフトウェア, Kabushiki-gaisha Bikutā Intarakutibu Sofutouea) was a Japanese video game software publisher and developer, established on October 1, 1996, as a division of Victor Entertainment. Their first game was Fish Eyes and its last game was Fish Eyes 3.

Some of its games used the Pack-In-Soft (パック・イン・ソフト, Pakku-In-Sofuto) brand.

== History ==
On October 1, 1996, Victor Entertainment merged with Pack-In-Video to establish Victor Interactive Software. On March 31, 2003, Victor Interactive Software was acquired by Marvelous Entertainment and became Marvelous Interactive, which was merged into Marvelous Entertainment in June 2007.

== Games ==
Title	Platform(s)	Release date	Notes
Fish Eyes	PlayStation	October 10, 1996	Published under the "Pack-In-Video" label
Fish Eyes	PlayStation	November 20, 1997	PlayStation the Best
Fish Eyes	PlayStation	February 7, 2002	PSOne Books
Kensei: The King of Boxing	PlayStation	November 15, 1996	
Hyper Securities S	Sega Saturn	February 7, 1997	Published under the "Pack-In-Video" label
Wing Over	PlayStation	February 21, 1997	Developed by Beluga Computer; Published under the "Pack-In-Video" label
Yuushun Classic Road	Sega Saturn	March 14, 1997	
SeaBass Fishing 2	Sega Saturn	April 25, 1997	
SeaBass Fishing 2	PlayStation	September 25, 1997	
SeaBass Fishing 2	Sega Saturn	March 12, 1998	Saturn Collection
Metal Angel 3	PlayStation	June 13, 1997	
Marica: Shinjitsu no Sekai	Sega Saturn	June 20, 1997	Developed by Feycraft
Moon Cradle	Sega Saturn	June 27, 1997	Developed by TOSE; Published under the "Pack-In-Soft" label
Boundary Gate: Daughter of Kingdom	PlayStation	July 17, 1997	
My Home Dream	PlayStation	July 24, 1997	
My Home Dream	PlayStation	August 6, 1998	PlayStation the Best
Fune Tarou	Super Famicom	August 1, 1997	Published under the "Pack-In-Soft" label
Kawa no Nushi Tsuri 3	Game Boy	September 19, 1997	
Kawa no Nushi Tsuri 3	Game Boy	March 1, 2000	Nintendo Power
Steep Slope Sliders	Sega Saturn	October 23, 1997	Developed by Cave; Published under the "Pack-In-Soft" label
Ochige Designer Tsukutte Pon!	Sega Saturn	November 20, 1997	Developed by NineLives
Ooedo Renaissance	Sega Saturn	December 18, 1997	Developed by Bits Laboratory
Gakkou wo Tsukurou!!	PlayStation	December 18, 1997	
Gakkou wo Tsukurou!!	PlayStation	February 18, 1999	PlayStation the Best
Gakkou wo Tsukurou!!	PlayStation	January 16, 2003	PSOne Books
Bokujou Monogatari GB	Game Boy	December 19, 1997	
Bokujou Monogatari GB	Game Boy	August 1, 2000	Nintendo Power
Nile Kawa no Yoake	Sega Saturn	March 5, 1998	Published under the "Pack-In-Soft" label
Wangan Trial	PlayStation	March 7, 1998	Developed by TOSE
Wangan Trial	PlayStation	September 22, 1999	Sanmai Series
Dungeon Master Nexus	Sega Saturn	March 26, 1998	
Wangan Trial Love	Sega Saturn	April 2, 1998	
Classic Road Yuushun	PlayStation	April 2, 1998	Developed by Progress Software
Dynamite Boxing	PlayStation	May 21, 1998	
Downhill Snow	PlayStation	May 28, 1998	Published under the "Pack-In-Soft" label
Murakoshi Masami no Bakuchou Nippon Rettou	PlayStation	June 11, 1998	Developed by A-Wave
Murakoshi Masami no Bakuchou Nippon Rettou	Sega Saturn	June 18, 1998	Developed by A-Wave
Hyper Securities 2	PlayStation	June 25, 1998	
Umi no Nushi Tsuri 2	Game Boy	July 10, 1998	Developed by TOSE
Umi no Nushi Tsuri 2	Game Boy	March 1, 2000	Nintendo Power
Akagawa Jirou: Yasoukyoku	PlayStation	July 16, 1998	Developed by Open Sesame
Kawa no Nushi Tsuri: Hikyou wo Motomete	PlayStation	August 20, 1998	
Kawa no Nushi Tsuri: Hikyou wo Motomete	PlayStation	December 2, 1999	PlayStation the Best
Kawa no Nushi Tsuri: Hikyou wo Motomete	PlayStation	December 5, 2002	PSOne Books
Rami-chan no Ōedo Sugoroku: Keiō Yūgekitai Gaiden	PlayStation	September 17, 1998	
Pilot ni Narou!	PlayStation	September 23, 1998	Developed by Beluga Computer
Pilot ni Narou!	PlayStation	November 11, 1999	PlayStation the Best
Pilot ni Narou!	PlayStation	December 5, 2002	PSOne Books
Falcom Classics II	Sega Saturn	October 29, 1998	
Umi no Oh! Yah!	PlayStation	October 29, 1998	
Neko no Ka-n-ke-i	PlayStation	November 5, 1998	
Nushi Tsuri 64	Nintendo 64	November 27, 1998	Published under the "Pack-In-Soft" label
Gakkou wo Tsukurou!! 2	PlayStation	December 10, 1998	
Let's Go Flyfishing	PlayStation	January 21, 1999	
Bokujou Monogatari 2	Nintendo 64	February 5, 1999	Published under the "Pack-In-Video" label
Luftwaffe: Doitsu Kuugun wo Shiki Seyo	PlayStation	February 25, 1999	Developed by Pegasus Japan
Falcom Classics Collection	Sega Saturn	March 4, 1999	
The Airs	PlayStation	March 25, 1999	
Pakuchikou Seabass Fishing	PlayStation	March 25, 1999	
Classic Road 2	PlayStation	April 1, 1999	Developed by Progress Software
Akagawa Jirou: Majotachi no Nemuri: Fukkatsusai	PlayStation	April 15, 1999	Developed by Open Sesame
Akagawa Jirou: Majotachi no Nemuri: Fukkatsusai	PlayStation	December 5, 2002	PSOne Books
Mirano no Arbeit Collection	PlayStation	July 1, 1999	Developed by Westone
Mirano no Arbeit Collection	PlayStation	March 7, 2002	PSOne Books
Kawa no Nushi Tsuri 4	Game Boy Color	July 16, 1999	
Umi no Nushi Tsuri: Takarajima ni Mukatte	PlayStation	July 22, 1999	Published under the "Pack-In-Soft" label
Umi no Nushi Tsuri: Takarajima ni Mukatte	PlayStation	June 27, 2002	PSOne Books
Bokujou Monogatari GB2	Game Boy Color	August 6, 1999	
Kisekae Monogatari	Game Boy Color	September 3, 1999	
Murakoshi Masami no Bakuchou Nippon Rettou: TsuriCon Edition	PlayStation	September 22, 1999	Developed by A-Wave
Kaeru no Ehon: Adventure for the Lost Memories	PlayStation	October 21, 1999	Developed by Infinity
Kaeru no Ehon: Adventure for the Lost Memories	PlayStation	November 9, 2000	Reprint
Submarine Hunter Sya-Chi	PlayStation	November 2, 1999	Developed by Sol
Submarine Hunter Sya-Chi	PlayStation	October 25, 2001	Victor Best
Submarine Hunter Sya-Chi	PlayStation	February 13, 2003	PSOne Books
Charumera	PlayStation	November 25, 1999	Developed by Bits Laboratory
Charumera	PlayStation	November 9, 2000	Reprint
My Home Dream 2	PlayStation	December 2, 1999	
My Home Dream 2	PlayStation	January 16, 2003	Victor the Best
Vampire Hunter D	PlayStation	December 9, 1999	
Vampire Hunter D	PlayStation	April 19, 2001	Victor Collection
Bokujou Monogatari: Harvest Moon	PlayStation	December 16, 1999	
Bokujou Monogatari: Harvest Moon	PlayStation	December 7, 2000	PlayStation the Best
Fish Eyes II	PlayStation	January 27, 2000	Developed by Open Sesame
Fish Eyes II	PlayStation	March 14, 2002	Victor Best
Jagainu-kun	Game Boy Color	March 24, 2000	
Warera Mitsurin Tankentai!!	PlayStation	April 20, 2000	Developed by Groove Box Japan
Warera Mitsurin Tankentai!!	PlayStation	October 25, 2001	Victor Best
Sorcerian: Shichisei Mahou no Shito	Dreamcast	April 27, 2000	
Victory Boxing	PlayStation	May 18, 2000	
Nushi Tsuri 64: Shiokaze Ni Notte	Nintendo 64	May 26, 2000	
Mushi Tarou	PlayStation	July 6, 2000	
Mushi Tarou	PlayStation	June 27, 2002	PSOne Books
Nushi Tsuri Adventure: Kite no Bouken	Game Boy Color	August 6, 2000	Developed by TOSE
Doguu Senki: Haou	Dreamcast	August 10, 2000	
Murakoshi Masami no Bakuchou Nippon Rettou 2	PlayStation	September 14, 2000	Developed by Infinity
Bokujou Monogatari GB3	Game Boy Color	September 29, 2000	
Gakkou wo Tsukurou!! Kouchou Sensei Monogatari	PlayStation	October 26, 2000	Developed by Groove Box Japan
Gakkou wo Tsukurou!! Kouchou Sensei Monogatari	PlayStation	October 25, 2001	Reprint
Tricolore Crise	Dreamcast	November 9, 2000	
Bokujou Monogatari: Harvest Moon for Girl	PlayStation	December 7, 2000	
Aqua Paradise: Boku no Suizokukan	PlayStation	December 28, 2000	Developed by Open Sesame
Fish Eyes Wild	Dreamcast	February 22, 2001	
Pilot ni Narou! 2	PlayStation 2	March 8, 2001	
Pilot ni Narou! 2	PlayStation 2	August 1, 2002	PlayStation 2 the Best
Kisekae Series 2: Oshare Nikki	Game Boy Color	March 23, 2001	
Hana to Taiyou to Ame to	PlayStation 2	May 2, 2001	Developed by Grasshopper Manufacture
Hana to Taiyou to Ame to	PlayStation 2	September 5, 2002	Victor the Best
Akagawa Jirou: Yasoukyoku 2	PlayStation	June 14, 2001	
Akagawa Jirou: Yasoukyoku 2	PlayStation	December 5, 2002	PSOne Books
Bokujou Monogatari 3: Heart ni Hi wo Tsukete	PlayStation 2	July 5, 2001	
Bokujou Monogatari 3: Heart ni Hi wo Tsukete	PlayStation 2	October 17, 2002	PlayStation 2 the Best
Ouma ga Toki	PlayStation	August 9, 2001	Developed by Break
Ouma ga Toki 2	PlayStation	September 13, 2001	Developed by Break
Komocchi	PlayStation	September 20, 2001	Developed by Open Sesame
DokiDoki Sasete!!	Game Boy Color	October 26, 2001	
Gekitou! Car Battler Go!!	Game Boy Advance	November 30, 2001	
Gakkou wo Tsukurou!! Advance	Game Boy Advance	December 7, 2001	Developed by Groove Box Japan
Sansara Naga 1x2	Game Boy Advance	December 14, 2001	Developed by Groove Box Japan
Kisekae Series 3: Kisekae Hamster	Game Boy Color	December 21, 2001	Developed by Kouyousha
Cinema Surfing: Youga Taizen	PlayStation 2	December 27, 2001	
Kawa no Nushi Tsuri 5: Fushigi no Mori Kawa	Game Boy Advance	March 15, 2002	Developed by TOSE
Reveal Fantasia	PlayStation 2	March 20, 2002	Developed by Infinity
Reveal Fantasia	PlayStation 2	December 5, 2002	Victor the Best
PukuPuku Tennen Kairanban	Game Boy Advance	April 26, 2002	
Tsuki no Hikari: Shizumeru Kane no Satsujin	PlayStation 2	May 23, 2002	Developed by Open Sesame
Tsuki no Hikari: Shizumeru Kane no Satsujin	PlayStation 2	June 26, 2003	Best Collection
My Home wo Tsukurou!	PlayStation 2	June 6, 2002	
Boku wa Chiisai	PlayStation 2	July 11, 2002	
Inaka Kurashi: Nan no Shima no Monogatari	PlayStation 2	September 12, 2002	
Chulip	PlayStation 2	October 3, 2002	Developed by Punchline
Chulip	PlayStation 2	April 24, 2003	Victor the Best
Funky Boxers	PlayStation	November 28, 2002	
Muzzle Flash	Xbox	February 27, 2003	
Fish Eyes 3	PlayStation 2	June 26, 2003	

=== Localizations ===
Title	Platform(s)	Release date	Notes
Tomb Raider	Sega Saturn	January 24, 1997	
Tomb Raider	PlayStation	February 14, 1997	
Tomb Raider	Sega Saturn	February 11, 1998	Saturn Collection
Break Point	Sega Saturn	June 27, 1997	Published under the "Pack-In-Video" label
Tomb Raider II	PlayStation	January 22, 1998	
Tomb Raider II	PlayStation	December 13, 2001	PSOne Books

== See also ==
- JVCKenwood Victor Entertainment
- Electronic Arts Victor
