= Strana Igr =

Russian video game magazine

Страна игр

- Chief editor: Konstantin Govorun
- Categories: Video games, anime
- Frequency: Jan 1996 - Oct 1998 - monthly Nov 1998 – Aug 2010 – semimonthly Sep 2010 - Aug 2013 - monthly Oct 2013 - Nov 2013 - bimonthly
- Publisher: Gameland
- First issue: February 1996
- Final issue Number: December 2013 #12 (350), 2013
- Country: Russia
- Language: Russian
- Website: www.gameland.ru
- ISSN: 1609-1035

Strana Igr (Russian: Страна игр, Gameland) was a Russian magazine focused on video games. It was published by Gameland between January 1996 and November 2013 when the magazine was suspended due to financial problems.

== History and profile ==
Starting December 2010, the magazine established a partnership with Japanese magazine Famitsu, publishing the best of their features. Magazine's chief editor Konstantin Govorun notes this allows the publication to cover exclusives prior to releases in English magazines.

In an interview with GamesLife.ru, Govorun describes that the magazine has seen a significant growth compared to its early years, now becoming one of the biggest video gaming magazine. He explains the success of the publication with the fact that Russia has a strong PC gamer market and that the few available non-Russian publications, such as Edge or gamesTM, do not share the same target audience. He also notes that the team, including editors, are allowed much freedom in writing columns and that the staff room did not see major changes over the years and considers these factors important for still being in circulation, despite other similar magazines having closed. Sergey Galenkin explains in a Kanobu.ru piece that in comparison to other defunct magazines, Strana Igr has taken care to publish non-sensationalized pieces steadily that match their target audience well. He also noted that the magazine's publisher Gameland runs several other publications and the magazine's online availability are positive factors to remain in circulation.

In magazine format, game reviews received a score of up to 10 in 0.5 increments. According to review aggregator Kritikanstvo, Strana Igr published over 3700 game reviews with an average score of 75%.

In late 2013 Strana Igr experienced financial problems, and the magazine's release was suspended. Many of the former employees joined the Russian version of IGN, which was launched by Gameland publishing house the same year.
