= The Black Bass (1988 video game) =

- North American front cover
- Developer: Another
- Publisher: HOT・B
- Directors: Hiroshi Katsumata; Kenji Ishikawa
- Series: The Black Bass
- Platform: Nintendo Entertainment System
- Release: JP: October 18, 1988; NA: September 1989
- Genre: Fishing
- Mode: Single-player

The Black Bass, known in Japan as The Black Bass II (ザ・ブラックバスII, Za Burakku Basu 2), is a NES fishing video game, developed by HOT・B and released in June 1989. It is the sequel to the Japan-exclusive The Black Bass on MSX and Family Computer. It is the second entry in the Black Bass series and the first to be released outside Japan. The game is sometimes referred to as The Black Bass USA, which is the name used on the North American version's title screen. It was re-released in 2016 as a built-in game for the Retro-Bit Generations retro video game console.

== Gameplay ==
A screenshot showing the player character about to cast. The red meter at the bottom of the screen determines the strength of the cast.

The objective of the game is for the player to advance in a series of bass fishing tournaments at four different lakes. Each tournament takes place from sunrise to sunset, and at the conclusion of the day, the player will only advance to the next tournament if they have caught a large number of bass with a high average weight. Pike, rainbow trout, and brown trout may also be caught, but will not affect the player's standing in the tournament.

The actual fishing takes place from an overhead perspective. The player casts their line, with the strength of their cast being determined by a power meter at the bottom of the screen. When the lure lands in the water, the player can manipulate its movement to entice a fish to bite it. Once a fish has bitten, the player has to reel it in carefully to avoid breaking the line.

The player can select from a variety of lure types and colors, with each being more or less effective depending on weather conditions and time of day. Fishing at different parts of the lake during different times of the day will also impact how likely one is to encounter a bass.

Progress in the game is saved via passwords awarded at the conclusion of each tournament. These passwords save the player's rank on their last tournament, which tournament they'll be participating in next, their total number of bass caught across all tournaments, and their average bass weight.

== Reception ==
Nintendo Power magazine gave The Black Bass an overall score of 3.5 out of 5 in their November 1989 issue.
