= Fishing video game =

Video game genre

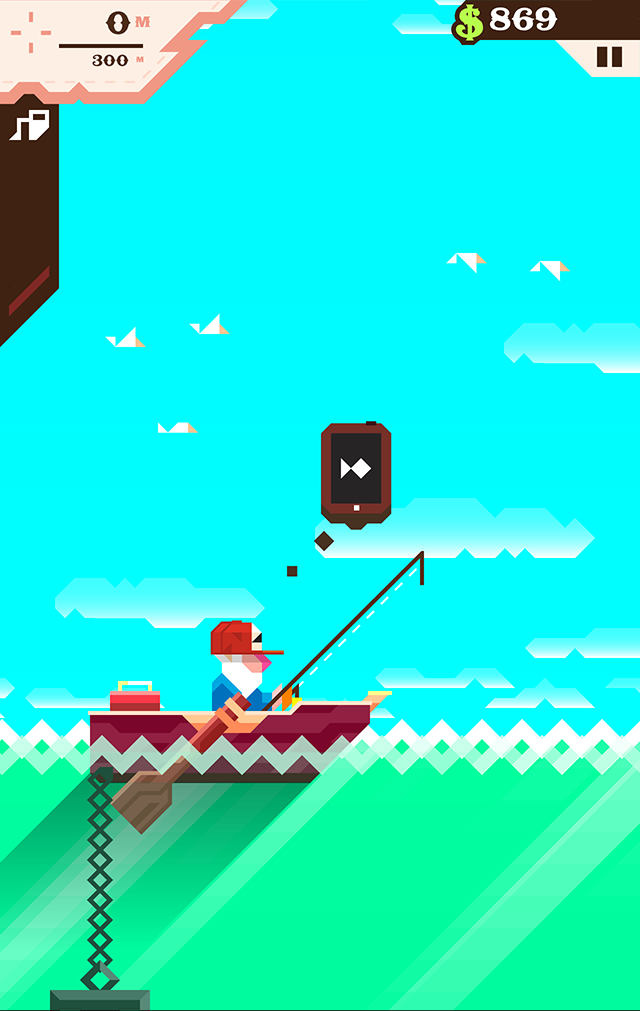
The game Ridiculous Fishing

A fishing video game is a genre of video games in which the player conducts virtual recreational fishing, usually in the context of angling and/or fishing tournaments. Considered a subset of simulation video games, and although not as prolific as other genres, fishing video games have historically been popular and have been released in arcade, console, PC and mobile platforms.

== History ==
Gone Fishin' (1977) developed by William Engel is considered to be the first fishing video game. Fishing Derby (1980) by David Crane was released three years later for the Atari 2600, and is the first fishing video game to incorporate graphics.

"Fish games" also refers to a type of arcade redemption game involving shooting fish. These games first appeared around 2005 in China. These games also became popular in the United States in the mid-2010s, starting in the Pacific rim before spreading in popularity. The legal status of these games has been disputed in many countries and states due to gambling issues, and association with organized crime.

== Gameplay ==
Most fishing games feature a wide variety of fisheries, game fish species, and tackles and other paraphernalia such as rods, baits/lures, reels and boats.

The gameplay of fishing games usually revolves around acquiring/choosing adequate baits/lures, casting, hooksetting in reaction to on-screen signals, along with some sort of button pressing combination or the use of specialized game controller to reel in the fish. In-game scoring is often determined by the cumulative "weight" of the fish caught in a single fishing session, sometimes with added bonus points given for the capture of trophy fish as well as quicker catches and performing special manoeuvres.

== Fishing minigames ==
Minigames of fishing are also common inside larger action-adventure games. Examples of fishing minigames can be seen in the Legend of Zelda series, Pokémon games, Red Dead Redemption 2, and many others. Open world games often include fishing mechanics as an optional gameplay feature. This is especially common in simulation videogames, where fishing is required to complete collections, fulfill missions, and obtaining crafting ingredients. Fishing games are a common element in most farm life sim games, going back to the original Harvest Moon on SNES.

== Accessories ==
Some gaming consoles incorporate the use of additional accessories to play fishing video games. Examples of such accessories include the Dreamcast reel and rod, the Wii Rod, and the Tsuricon 64. These accessories are often sold in licensed packages with fishing video games, although unlicensed accessories do exist.
