= Shining Force EXA =

2007 video game

- Developer: Neverland
- Publisher: Sega
- Director: Shinya Togo
- Producer: Makoto Takada
- Writer: Takashi Hino
- Composer: Tomoko Morita
- Series: Shining
- Platform: PlayStation 2
- Release: PlayStation 2: JP: January 18, 2007; NA: March 20, 2007
- Genre: Action role-playing game
- Mode: Single player

Shining Force EXA (シャイニング・フォース イクサ, Shainingu Fōsu Ikusa) is an action role-playing game developed by Neverland and published by Sega for the PlayStation 2 as part of the Shining series. It tells the story of a world divided by a war between humans and demons.

Like Shining Force Neo, the gameplay is in the vein of Diablo or Record of Lodoss War (the latter also by Neverland). The game features a variety of weaponry inspired by the medieval era, magic, and a collection of skills that can be improved upon for the main characters.

== Gameplay ==
Shining Force EXA is the successor to Shining Force NEO and inherited that game's battle and action RPG mechanics.

One new feature of EXA is the customizable robot castle Geo-Fortress. While adventuring, the party members left behind use the Geo-Fortress as a headquarters. They also protect and defend the castle in the event of an attack. In the beginning, the fortress is very basic and vulnerable. By collecting "Rare Material" from the given quests, the player is able to transform the fortress into two other forms. Once the fortress reaches the third form, it is capable of travel. The player is able to add more rooms for vendors and shops. In addition to a traveling store, the player is also able to train party members. The growth, layout, and defense of the fortress is managed completely by the player, thus allowing the Geo-Fortress to evolve to fit the style and tactics of the player.

The player upgrades characters through experience points and an assortment of items and weapons. In addition, using specific battle tactics of the party will grant it more power and range. As well as advancing the main character, the player progresses to master a variety of Power Arts to unleash special and magic attacks.

== Plot ==
The story focuses mainly on two characters that the player will have the opportunity to control: Toma, a brash sword wielder who dreams of being "King of the World," and Cyrille, a mage of sorts whose reasons for searching for the Shining Force are a well kept mystery. Joining the party almost immediately will be the other half of its members, Gadfort, who wants the blade to become the greatest knight in existence, and Maebelle, an elfin archer seeking the blade to save her people. Their story will unfold in a world that is shared by humans, demons, and beasts that is constantly devastated by war. The world is divided into two main kingdoms. The Noswald Empire is home to the human race and the demons rule the southern territory, Fyrlandt.

== Characters ==
=== Main characters ===
Toma: A human boy born and raised in the wild. He doesn't appear to be very intelligent, but has a cheerful disposition and a bit of a quick temper. He possesses a strong sense of justice, and the one thing he wants in life is "great power", which leads him on his quest for the holy sword known as the Shining Force. He is often advised by Zenus, a jackal-like creature who is a product of ancient methods. He thinks that having the power of the Shining Force will help him accomplish his goal.

Cyrille: A human girl brought up in the Noswald Empire, one of the two main warring factions in the world of Shining Force EXA. She is the opposite of Toma, highly intelligent and a skilled user and researcher of magic. Like Toma, she is also in search of the holy Shining Force sword. She has a cool disposition and tends to be cold towards people, but despite her outward appearance, she is truly a gentle person. Sweets and candy are said to be a secret indulgence of hers. She is often accompanied by her familiar, a ferret-like creature called Zhirra.

=== Secondary characters ===
Maebelle: An elf maiden searching for the Holy Sword in the hopes of saving her dying race. Calm but merciless in battle. Superb archery skills. According to Maebelle, she is what the elves refer to as the "Last Child", meaning she was the last newborn elf since the incident with her people unable to bear children. Maebelle is quite mature and has a motherly complex toward Cyrille at times. Her unique trait is that she seems to eat more than anyone else in the party (much to Duga's surprise) and frequently snacks when she gets a chance.

Gadfort: Former Noswald knight. Parted ways with the Emperor due to differing ideals. Met Toma and the others on his quest for the Holy Sword. Uses a lance as a weapon. Gadfort has a habit of lecturing Toma on his sword style, calling it unpredictable and without form, but in actuality he is simply being a teacher to him. Gadfort idolizes the legendary hero Avalon, and has just about every book written on him in his personal collection. He also follows a lot of Avalon's examples, such as keeping the weapons and armor in his room spotless.

Amitaliri: A girl from an elite Magnus family from which many La Vaes were born. Reckless and truant. Neglects her training but is skilled at magic. Toma nicknames her Ami Girl, which she hates, and is generally called Ami by everyone else. She has a school girl crush on Duga, who can't stand her approaches, but she eventually gives up on trying to get his interest. Her self-centered attitude causes a lot of grief for Faulklin, who has to do everything for her, from cleaning their room to doing her school assignments (along with his own).

Faulklin: A peace-loving Quintol boy. He learned the art of healing and light magic to assist his good friend, Amitaliri. He is generally shy and very quiet, except when it comes to dealing with Ami. He may have some feelings for her, but can't seem to tell her outright. Faulklin is easily taken advantage of and is stuck doing a lot of the work for the two of them. His healing talents and holy attack spells are quite noteworthy on missions.

Duga: A Wolfling and former Noswald Army officer. Gadfort's best friend and a friendly rival, claiming to be stronger than him. Duga is a talented fighter among Wolflings, and is always keeping himself trained and rested for battle. He seems to have a thing for Maebelle and openly asks her out on dates in the Geo-Fortress. He actually has a habit of telling dirty jokes and is quite the womanizer. Much like Volg from Shining Tears, he is strong and fast, but lacks the defense necessary to withstand much damage at any one time.

Adam: A robot soldier from an ancient mobile fortress. He is highly intelligent but lacks emotions and empathy. He originally served alongside the previous Heritor in an ancient war. His systems shut down after fighting too many enemies and straining his power reserves. His memory banks can immediately recall records and analysis from the war. According to him, the description of his capabilities was taken out of a sales manual.

=== Antagonists ===
Ragnadaam III: The current Emperor of the human Noswald Empire. He is known to his people as "The Lion". At first, he tries to talk to Toma and finds him too immature to deal with. Soon after he sets his sights on Cyrille, and holds informed conversations with her. Because Cyrille is quite familiar with world history, Ragna tries to convince her to choose sides, because he wants to obtain the power of the Shining Force for himself.

Riemsianne La Vaes: The current La Vaes, also known as the Queen of Fyrlandt, the southern territory belonging to the magnus. She is quite manipulative and tries to lure Toma to her side with her feminine wiles many times throughout the story. However, despite her calm appearance, she is quite deadly in battle and wields devastating magic spells. Reimsianne is a responsible leader to her people and strictly follows an age-old taboo of not trying to incite a war with the humans.

=== Optional characters ===
Garyu: A mysterious dragon whose name is known only from a signboard. He is clearly very intelligent and can understand human speech. Garyu interacts little with the party, and is only affectionate toward Toma and Cyrille. He is immensely strong and able to take on and defeat great numbers of enemies all on his own. He is gained after defeating him in his cave.

Avalon: An undead man with the same name as a legendary knight. Gadfort is convinced of his identity because of his skills and weapon. Avalon is quite open with regards to his past, having fought with a powerful dark mage when he was a reckless overconfident knight, and lost his life for it and was cursed. Toma and Cyrille were shocked with his need to drink human blood to sustain himself. However, Avalon is greatly opposed to the thought of actually murdering another human. He occasionally cracks a joke about drinking the blood of beautiful young girls. He is gained through collecting his bones scattered throughout the game.

== Reception ==
Reception

Aggregate score
Aggregator	Score
Metacritic	64/100

Review scores
Publication	Score
Electronic Gaming Monthly	5.67/10 (Note: Three critics of Electronic Gaming Monthly gave the game each a score of 6/10, 7/10, and 4/10.)
Famitsu	35/40
Game Informer	7.5/10
GameDaily	6/10
GameSpot	5.3/10
GameSpy	3/5
GameZone	7/10
Hardcore Gamer	3.25/5
IGN	7/10
PlayStation: The Official Magazine	8.5/10
RPGamer	2.5/5
RPGFan	70%
X-Play	4/5

The game received "mixed" reviews according to the review aggregation website Metacritic. In Japan, Famitsu gave it a score of two nines, one eight, and one nine for a total of 35 out of 40.

IGN gave praise to the length and overall design of the game, but criticized the lag often experienced by having so many enemies on the screen at once. GameSpy called the Geo-Fortress system "innovative", but the game in general "uninspired". A more critical review was given by GameSpot, highlighting the game's weak combat, voice acting, and frame-rate, while approving of its visual presentation. On a slightly different note, RPGamer criticized the game's recycling of elements from Shining Force Neo, and the high quantities of enemies that lengthen the "few new areas on display". However, praise was given to the "good character progression", "somewhat interesting story", and the two different playstyles. GamePro said of the game, "If you can overlook those shortcomings, you'll be treated to a decent enough RPG game. EXA doesn't do much to further the legacy of the series but at least it doesn't critically damage it either." (Note: GamePro gave the game two 4/5 scores for graphics and control, 2/5 for sound, and 3.5/5 for fun factor.)

== See also ==
- Project X Zone, a crossover game featuring characters from EXA
