= Shining in the Darkness =

1991 video game

- North American box art by Greg Martin
- Developer: Climax Entertainment
- Publisher: Sega
- Director: Kan Naito
- Producer: Hiroyuki Takahashi
- Writer: Hiroyuki Takahashi
- Composer: Masahiko Yoshimura
- Series: Shining
- Platform: Sega Genesis
- Release: JP: March 29, 1991; NA: October 1991; PAL: November 11, 1991
- Genre: Role-playing
- Mode: Single-player

Shining in the Darkness (Note: Released as Shining and the Darkness (シャイニング&ザ・ダクネス, Shainingu & Za Dakunesu) in Japan) is a 1991 role-playing video game developed by Climax Entertainment and published by Sega for the Sega Genesis. It is the first game in the Shining series.

In 2007, the game was re-released on the Wii Virtual Console. The game also appears in Sonic's Ultimate Genesis Collection for Xbox 360 and PlayStation 3, as well as Sega Mega Drive and Genesis Classics on PC.

== Gameplay ==
Gameplay screenshot

Shining in the Darkness is a "dungeon crawler" role-playing video game that puts the player in control of the main character and two friends (Pyra and Milo) as they explore 3D dungeon mazes with turn-based battles. The game consists of story line interaction, dungeon exploration, random monster fights, and predetermined 'boss' fights. The combat in this game operates similarly to role-playing video games of the era such as Dragon Quest (or, more specifically, Wizardry). Additionally, the dungeon contains three characters in need of rescue. Rescuing any or all of the three is optional, and the story changes depending on whether or not the player locates and returns each of these characters to safety. Another key innovation is its icon-based menu system. This is used for battles in dungeons, equipment management, and character interactions in town.

== Plot ==
Shining in the Darkness is set in the Kingdom of Thornwood. The king's daughter and the main character's father have vanished, while the evil sorcerer Dark Sol (not to be confused with his father, Shining Force villain Darksol) has appeared to threaten the kingdom. The main character is charged to find the Arms of Light, rescue the princess and his own father, and stop Dark Sol.

In Shining Force Gaiden: Final Conflict, it was revealed Dark Sol is the son of Darksol and Mishaela, the villains of Shining Force: The Legacy of Great Intention. After the final defeat of Darksol, the child Dark Sol was whisked away by Oddeye, the foremost Greater Devil of Darksol's archenemy, Zeon. Therefore, Dark Sol's role in Shining in the Darkness places its entry in the timeline sometime following the events of Shining Force II. This revelation also supported by a possible reference to Darksol, when Theos mentions "a Dark Wizard" who once wielded the same Dragonbreath spell as Dark Sol.

== Development ==
Sega allocated the bare minimum budget offered to out-of-house developers for the creation of Shining in the Darkness. In a 2009 interview, Hiroyuki Takahashi (credited for "writing" and producing the game) recalled:

Because we were on such a tight budget, apart from the programming and graphics, I did nearly all of the work on [Shining in the Darkness]. I suppose the basic concept behind Darkness was 'realism'. I thought it would be exciting if the player could actually travel to a fantasy world and walk around, exploring old houses, dungeons and other places. It was in essence a continuation of the sense of excitement you'd get from moving through the dungeons in older games such as Wizardry. By 'reality' I'm not talking about true realism – I mean the feeling that you really are progressing through actual houses and dungeons, and the same thing applied to the battles.

The game was re-released on the Wii Virtual Console in North America on August 13, 2007, and in Europe on September 7, 2007.

== Reception ==
Contemporary reviews

Review scores
Publication	Score
Dragon	4/5
Famitsu	8/10, 9/10, 8/10, 6/10
Sega Force	90%
Sega Pro	93%

Retrospective reviews

Aggregate score
Aggregator	Score
GameRankings	70%

Review scores
Publication	Score
AllGame	2.5/5
RPGFan	82%

Sega Pro reviewed the game in 1991 and gave it a 93% score, describing the dungeon crawler as "superior to all other RPGs of this style", praising its detailed "background preparation", detailed graphics (including scaling sprites and water effects), character conversations, sound design (especially around taverns), replayability ("Every game is different"), and its innovative icon-based menu system. Peter Olafson of Computer Gaming World compared Shining to Dungeon Master and Speed Racer, and favorably cited the combat and animation. The magazine concluded that the game was a "hack-and-slash adventure" that is "not the full-blown CRPG that many gamers were hoping for" but "a decided step" in that direction. Dragon reviewers praised the game's smooth interface and gave it four out of five stars, saying that it "combines the icons and combat of Phantasy Star III, the first person perspective of Phantasy Star I, and the great close-up graphics of Phantasy Star II."

Mega placed the game at #28 in their Top Mega Drive Games of All Time. In 2017, GamesRadar ranked the game 32nd on their "Best Sega Genesis/Mega Drive games of all time."

By late 1991, over 300,000 copies of the game had sold and paved the way for the new game project Shining Force.

== Legacy ==
Shining in the Darkness is considered by many gaming historians to be a pioneer of Japanese console RPGs, especially in Europe, which would not see a Final Fantasy game until more than six years after the Darkness made its mark in the region. One of the game's key innovations was its introduction of an icon-based menu system, possibly inspired by fellow Sega RPG Phantasy Star III: Generations of Doom (1990). The game also marked the beginning of the successful Shining series.

The second game in the Shining series, Shining Force, diverged greatly in gameplay; however, many stylistic parts are reminiscent of Shining in the Darkness, including music and art. Other features such as the distinctive menu system, the use of priests for saving games and resurrecting characters, and several magic spells that would continue to be used in every game in the series up to and including Shining Force III, with the notable exception of Shining Wisdom. These games also all share story continuity, even Wisdom.

A Shining game with similar gameplay, Shining the Holy Ark, was released for the Sega Saturn in 1996.
