= Shining Force Neo =

2005 video game

- Developers: Neverland; Pyramid
- Publisher: Sega
- Director: Naoyuki Ukeda
- Producers: Makoto Takada; Atsushi Ii
- Designers: Shinya Togo; Takashi Miyasaka
- Artists: Yuriko Nishiyama (character designer); Yoshitaka Tamaki (monster designer)
- Composers: Tomoko Morita; Yukio Nakajima
- Series: Shining
- Platform: PlayStation 2
- Release: JP: March 24, 2005; NA: October 20, 2005
- Genre: Action role-playing game
- Mode: Single-player

Shining Force Neo (シャイニング・フォース ネオ, Shainingu Fōsu Neo) is an action role-playing game co-developed by Neverland and published by Sega in 2005 for the Sony PlayStation 2 as a part of the Shining series.

It is not a turn-based strategy game as the other games of the Shining Force sub-series are. Instead, it uses real time action, similar in nature to the popular game Diablo or Record of Lodoss War (the latter also by Neverland). The game features a variety of weaponry inspired by the medieval era, magic, and a collection of skills that can be improved upon for the main character. Like other games in the series, it features anthropomorphic characters and a battle between forces of Light and Darkness. The story is loosely adapted from the original Shining Force.

== Backstory ==
Thirteen years before the game begins, the world was locked in a war against the Clan of the Moon. Foul monsters known as "Legions" were unleashed by the Clan against their enemies in their bid for domination. Powerful heroes called Forces soon rose up to lead the charge against them. Aided by Force Frames, ordinary warriors became gifted with a variety of powerful advantages that made them more than what they would have been otherwise. With this, the war against the Clan of the Moon began to turn. The Clan's Dark Castle and the Legions were banished in the end. Victory was achieved, but only at a great cost. Several nations were utterly destroyed and most of the Forces that participated in the final battle had perished.

When the story starts, a young warrior named Max has nearly completed the training that will make him a Force. Journeying home, he hopes to achieve his dream, not realizing that it is only the beginning of an adventure that will take him and his friends across the world to stop the return of evil.

== Characters ==
Throughout Shining Force Neo there are many characters the player will encounter. However, only the main character (Max) can develop his skills outside of his initial starting role to encompass a larger selection of abilities. The other characters also progressively grow in power, but remain locked in their roles as there are no provisions made to upgrade their skills in the same way as Max.

- Max: A young warrior at the age of 17. After training for two years to become a Force under his master Graham, he is finally allowed to return home to become a Force. He can use a wide variety of weapons in combat and is also the only character that the player can customize with particular skill enhancements via his Force Frame.
- Meryl: Max's family friend, she became an orphan after her parents died in the war 13 years ago. She has been close to Max since. She has had magical training, allowing her to assist Max.
- Cain: Max's older brother. He was one of the youngest warriors ever to become a Force. It was said that he disappeared after being sent on a mission following the war.
- Gaia: Max's father and one of the veteran warriors instrumental in vanquishing the Clan of the Moon in the war 13 years ago. Gaia is regarded as an extremely skilled and powerful Force.
- Graham: A highly skilled centaur knight and captain of the Border Knights at Larcyle Fort. He is also a renowned Force and Max's mentor.
- Chiquitita: Lady of Cantore in Feldland, she is also a Force. She is skilled in recovery spells.
- Baron: A Force of Feldland and the wolfing captain of Quincine Royal Guard. His well-spoken mannerisms and quiet demeanor on the battlefield hide his true skills as a ninja warrior.
- Rhinos: Ex-captain of the Quincine Royal Guard and a Force who lives his life in seclusion, this titan still maintains his skills as a powerful warrior.
- Mariel: She is a Force and a skilled centaur knight of Eranore. As the party will also discover, she is also the daughter of Graham.
- Dryu: A baby dragon found by Klein and Freya. Her attacks include fire breath, a kick and a shockwave.
- Adam: A robot that raised Max and his brother as children. He is a powerful warrior.

== Music ==
The Japanese release includes the opening theme "Zetsubou to Kibou" [絶望と希望] (or if translated, "Despair and Hope") performed by Ai Kawashima, previously half of musical duo "I WiSH". The song was released as a single on April 6, 2005. The game's original score was written by Tomoko Morita and Yukio Nakajima.

== Reception ==
Reception

Aggregate score
Aggregator	Score
Metacritic	69/100

Review scores
Publication	Score
Eurogamer	4/10
Famitsu	33/40
GameSpot	7/10
Official U.S. PlayStation Magazine	3.5/5
PlayStation: The Official Magazine	5.5/10
RPGamer	2/5
RPGFan	72%
X-Play	3/5

The game received "average" reviews according to the review aggregation website Metacritic. In Japan, Famitsu gave it a score of three eights and one nine for a total of 33 out of 40.
