= Shining Soul II =

2003 video game

- North American box art
- Developer: Grasshopper Manufacture
- Publishers: JP/EU: Sega; EU: THQ; NA: Atlus USA
- Director: Akira Ueda
- Producer: Junichiro Takahashi
- Designer: Akira Ueda
- Composer: Masafumi Takada
- Series: Shining
- Platform: Game Boy Advance
- Release: JP: July 24, 2003; EU: March 26, 2004; NA: April 20, 2004
- Genre: Action role-playing
- Modes: Single-player, multiplayer

Shining Soul II (Note: Japanese: シャイニング・ソウルII, Hepburn: Shainingu Sōru Tsu) is an action role-playing game for the Game Boy Advance. It was developed by Grasshopper Manufacture, as the sequel to Shining Soul and part of the Shining series. The game was originally scheduled to be released on February 24, 2004, before it was delayed by two months.

The game is a dungeon crawling hack and slash, playing similarly to Diablo or Baldur's Gate: Dark Alliance. It features eight playable characters, ten dungeons tied into a storyline, and eight hidden dungeons to explore. The game supports multiplayer via link cable as well as single-player.

== Gameplay ==
The game features eight character classes which can be improved up to level 200. Each is customisable with a variety of weapons, spells, support abilities, and attributes. Different classes who can use the same weapons attack differently from them. For example, the Warrior's spear attack is a thrust, while the Archer throws his spear over a distance. Each usable spell in the game has its own spellbook, and only classes with that spell on their skills list can use the spellbook to cast the spell.

- Warrior - A well-balanced melee class. Default name: Eric (Alex in Japanese).
- Archer - Attacks from afar using bows and spears, and summons forest creatures. Default name: Rwinn (Luin in Japanese).
- Sorceress - Uses a variety of offensive elemental spells from a distance. Default name: Premiera (Pamela in Japanese).
- Dragonute - The slowest but toughest melee class. Default name: Tyroth (Tiros in Japanese).
- Priestess - Specializes in healing and support spells. Default name: Prim.
- Dark Wizard - Uses Dark elemental spells. Default name: Armand (Bloodstar in Japanese).
- Brawler - The most powerful and quick offensive melee class, but suffers from low defence. Default name: Zachs (Sachs in Japanese).
- Ninja - A swift medium-ranged class using a mix of spells and physical attacks. Default name: Raizen.
- ??? - A Dark wizard similar to Armand; the secret character who becomes available after beating the game once. Has no default name.

Each character is able to equip up to three weapons and three items for use and switch between them at any time. The player can get 3 extra slots either by equipping the Backpack or Knapsack. Attacks are performed by tapping the attack button or holding it to charge a more powerful attack. Beyond regular equipment, a "Soul" item can also be equipped; it is charged by defeating enemies and unleashed to inflict massive damage on nearby enemies. They come in various elemental types and levels of effectiveness. They are graded on the Roman numerals I, II, III, IV and V, with V being the strongest and taking the longest to charge up.

Characters also have resistance to a number of elements: Fire, Ice, Thunder, Light, Dark and Poison. These can be raised by equipment, but also through endurance: by taking damage of a particular elemental kind, they can increase their resistance to it, but being killed by an attack of that type will decrease the resistance level by a point.

=== Multiplayer ===
The multiplayer is very similar to that of Diablo. The player characters navigate the dungeon and attack monsters. Players can give items to each other by throwing or dropping them. The party can only move to the next area when every player character has either passed the exit point of the current area or died. Opening the inventory window does not pause the game (in single-player or multiplayer), so some players can reorganize their inventory while others engage in combat. Some classes are more useful in multiplayer, such as the priestess or archer.

== Plot ==
Shining Soul II has little connection to the storyline of the rest of the series aside from a reference to the events of Shining Soul in the introduction. However, an alternate universe version of Boken from Shining Force appears as a major NPC, traditional Shining mascot Yogurt is hidden in one of the stages, and a number of dungeons from the original Shining Soul appear as short hidden dungeons.

Centuries after the defeat of Dark Dragon in Shining Soul, the light had become too strong, opening the way to a resurgence of darkness. A crystal in the possession of King Marcel and Queen Yvonne of Klantol, which throughout the story reflects the current balance of light and darkness, turns from shining to cloudy. An alchemist named Gillespie, a member of a dark order, the Chaos Knights, worms his way into the friendship of King Marcel's most trusted knight, Deatharte. Gillespie then disappears, leaving something called "the forbidden fruit" with Deatharte. Driven by curiosity, Deatharte eventually eats the fruit and is corrupted by darkness.

Later, a tournament at the Klantol Colosseum is interrupted by news that Princess Camille has been abducted. King Marcel orders Deatharte to search for her. Deatharte pretends to obey but instead goes to join the Chaos Knights. Since Marcel is also concerned about an army of goblins mustering near the castle, he sends a promising young participant in the tournament (the player character) to investigate. Penetrating the goblin fort, the young hero not only confirms that the goblins were planning an attack on the castle, but learns that they abducted Camille and delivered her to the evil witch Wizari, who plans to sacrifice her to increase her power. The hero defeats the goblins and recovers the key to Camille's prison. Since Deatharte has naturally still not returned, Marcel relies upon the young hero to journey to Wizari's palace and save Camille. He succeeds in doing this and slaying Wizari.

The celebration is short-lived, as normally peaceful beings are driven mad by darkness. The hero's investigations of these incidents take him to the mainland of Klantol, where he uncovers a plot by the Chaos Knights to conquer the world. Meanwhile, Princess Camille sneaks away to find Gillespie and manages to learn the password to the Chaos Knights' hidden stronghold. She is later trapped in Koldazhek Cave but is rescued by the hero and tells him the password. Infiltrating the Chaos Knights' stronghold, the hero slays both Gillespie and Deatharte, who had become the leader of the Chaos Knights.

The defeat of the Chaos Knights, however, causes a violent shift in balance from darkness to light, awakening a destructive power called Chaos, which even the forces of darkness fear. Marcel, Yvonne, Camille, and the court wizard are spirited away by Chaos. A former knight guides the hero to a passage to Chaos's realm. The hero goes there and defeats Chaos, rescuing the four prisoners and restoring balance to the world.

== Reception ==
Reception

Aggregate scores
Aggregator	Score
GameRankings	78.75%
Metacritic	74 of 100

Review scores
Publication	Score
Electronic Gaming Monthly	7.17 of 10 (Note: In Electronic Gaming Monthly's early review of the game, one critic gave it 7.5/10, and the rest gave it each a score of 7/10.)
Famitsu	32 of 40
Game Informer	7.5 of 10
GameSpot	7.7 of 10
GameSpy	3 of 5
IGN	7.5 of 10
Jeuxvideo.com	16 of 20
Joypad	8 of 10
Nintendo Power	4.2 of 5
RPGamer	2 of 5
RPGFan	74%

Shining Soul II received "mixed or average reviews" according to the review aggregation website Metacritic. In Japan, Famitsu gave it a score of all four eights for a total of 32 out of 40. A lot of magazines gave the game favorable reviews while it was still in development.
