= Single Best =

Single Best may refer to:

- Single Best, album by Kou Shibasaki
- Single Best (Day After Tomorrow album)
- Single Best, album by Exile (Japanese band), Rock & Pop Album Of The Year Award 2006
- Single Best 10, Sharam Q 1996
- Single Best, Ai Kawashima 2008
