= Dark Dragon =

Dark Dragon may refer to:

- The Dark Dragon, a fictional character in the TV series American Dragon: Jake Long
- Dark Dragon, a fictional character in the video game Shining Force
- Dark Dragon (wrestler), Japanese professional wrestler
- Dark Dragon (luchador), Mexican professional wrestler
