= Blade Arcus from Shining =

2014 video game

- PlayStation 3 and 4 cover art
- Developer: Studio Saizensen
- Publishers: Sega; Studio Saizensen (Microsoft Windows)
- Platforms: Arcade, PlayStation 3, PlayStation 4, Windows, Nintendo Switch
- Release: Arcade: JP: November 5, 2014; EX; PS3, PS4: JP: November 26, 2015; Battle Arena; Windows: WW: July 28, 2016; Rebellion; PS4, Switch: JP: March 14, 2019
- Genre: Fighting
- Modes: Single-player, multiplayer

Blade Arcus from Shining (Note: Japanese: ブレードアークス・フロム・シャイニング) is a 2014 2D fighting video game developed by Studio Saizensen and published by Sega for the arcades. It features characters from the Shining series and is a crossover featuring characters from Shining Blade and Shining Hearts. An updated version, subtitled EX, was released on November 26, 2015, for the PlayStation 3 and PlayStation 4, adding new characters. The game was ported to PC and released on Steam with online lobbies added on July 28, 2016, under the title Blade Arcus from Shining: Battle Arena. Another update named Blade Arcus Rebellion from Shining was released for the PlayStation 4 and Nintendo Switch on March 14, 2019, featuring extra characters from Shining Resonance Refrain.

== Gameplay ==
The game is played using an 8-directional joystick and four buttons. Three buttons, designated A, B, C, correspond respectively to the light, medium, and heavy attacks. The fourth, designated D, is used for the Support Link. Players select two characters to form a tag-team pairing. They control their primary characters, and are able to switch to using their supporting characters after each round.

=== Characters ===
Blade Arcus from Shining features sixteen playable characters drawn from across all Shining game series.

- Ryuga
- Pairon
- Rage
- Sakuya
- Altina
- Roselinde
- Melty
- Fenrir
- Rick
- Uryukihime
- Dylan
- Rouna
- Misty
- Sonia
- Xiaomei
- Isaac

== Reception ==
Reception

Aggregate score
Aggregator	Score
Metacritic	PC: 64/100

Review scores
Publication	Score
Mamonix	75%
Multiplayer.it	65%

The game has received mixed reviews. Atomix said "the game seems a little lackluster when compared with other great fighting franchises. It is a really good fighting title, but one that will be enjoyed, mostly, by the followers from the original RPG series." Multiplayer.it said that it "delivers an enjoyable beat'em up experience, but lacks the depth of the best 2D fighting games."

== See also ==
- Blade Strangers, 2018 fighting game also developed by Studio Saizensen
