= Mega-Play =

- Sega Mega Play, a JAMMA-compatible arcade game system based on Mega Drive/Genesis technology
- Mega Play (Mega magazine), a section in British video game magazine Mega
