= Shining the Holy Ark =

1996 video game

- North American box art depicting three of the playable characters: Rodi (upper left) Melody (center left) and Arthur (center)
- Developers: Sonic! Software Planning; Camelot Software Planning
- Publisher: Sega
- Director: Yasuhiro Taguchi
- Producers: Hiroyuki Takahashi; Shugo Takahashi
- Designers: Ayumu Shindo; Daisuke Takagi; Shuji Shimizu; Yūsuke Sugimoto
- Programmers: Akiko Sato; Haruki Kodera; Kaoru Shimada; Kenji Numaya
- Artist: Shin Yamanouchi
- Composer: Motoi Sakuraba
- Series: Shining
- Platform: Sega Saturn
- Release: JP: December 20, 1996; EU: June 19, 1997; NA: July 14, 1997
- Genres: Dungeon crawler, role-playing
- Mode: Single-player

Shining the Holy Ark (シャイニング・ザ・ホーリィアーク) is a 1996 first person role-playing video game developed by and published by Sega for the Sega Saturn. It is part of Sega's Shining series of video games, and marked a new direction for the series, utilizing polygons as well as sprites for the visuals and a story targeted more specifically towards an adult audience. It introduced the saga of the Vandals and the Innovators, abandoning the saga of the Devil Kings which was followed by the previous installments of the series.

In contrast to the action-adventure format of the first Shining game on the Saturn, Shining Wisdom, Shining the Holy Ark revived older RPG elements such as extensive first-person dungeon crawling and turn-based combat. It had greater critical success than its predecessor, with praise going to its unique graphical style and engaging battles.

== Gameplay ==
The battle system in Shining in the Holy Ark returns to the style present in Shining in the Darkness. Most enemies are encountered in dungeons like this example here.

Gameplay is most similar to Shining in the Darkness; the player explores towns and dungeons in the first-person view, with battles almost exclusively taking place in dungeons. Exploration uses traditional node-based movement rather than the continuous, free-form movement used in most first-person games at the time Shining the Holy Ark was released. The player controls a party of up to four characters, but additional characters can be kept in reserve and called upon mid-battle if needed.

Battles take place at random and are in a turn-based format, maintaining the first-person view but also allowing the player to view allies as they take their actions. As with every previous game in the Shining series, Shining the Holy Ark uses a menu system in which each menu has exactly four options, all represented by icons.

The effectiveness of the playable characters is increased through the traditional methods of earning experience points and equipping better weapons and armor. New spells are learned automatically when the character reaches higher experience levels.

The game utilizes a "pixie" system, where the player can befriend pixies that can attack enemies at the opening of an encounter. There are five types of pixie: fairy, pixie, succubus, incubus, and leprechaun. When an enemy appears, the player has a few seconds to select the right type of pixie for the direction that the enemy is coming from. For example, leprechauns will only attack enemies that come from underground, while fairies only attack enemies that drop down from above. If the player selects the right type of pixie, it deals some damage to the enemies and increases the amount of gold and experience points earned from the encounter.

Towns can be explored freely without encountering battles, and include buildings where the player can purchase new armor and weapons, save their game, and have their party recover from injuries and illness.

== Plot ==
Mercenaries Arthur, Melody, and Forte are hired by the King of Enrich to hunt down and capture a renegade ninja by the name of Rodi. The group pursues Rodi to the nearby mines where, after a brief skirmish, an unknown craft crashes through the roof. All four characters are gravely injured, but soon healed by being possessed by strange spirits. While those inhabiting Arthur, Melody and Rodi seem benevolent, Forte is occupied by an evil spirit. From here the story follows the three unwitting heroes as they fight to stop the revival of the legendary 1,000 year kingdom, which would return the world to an age of darkness.

Shining the Holy Ark takes place 10 years before Shining Force III. While in the town of Enrich, Arthur and the others meet a young boy named Julian. He tells them that his father went to investigate a haunted mansion in the woods, but never returned. Since that time he has been in the care of a family friend. It would later be discovered that Julian's father was killed by Galm, one of the mythical Vandals that ruled over the world during the time of the 1,000 year kingdom. His father's death compels Julian to seek revenge against Galm, which sets into motion his involvement in the events of Shining Force III.

== Characters ==
=== Playable characters ===
- Arthur – a mercenary swordsman, silent protagonist, and host for the spirit. With experience, gains the ability to use both support and offensive magic. The player sees through his eyes.
- Melody – a mercenary shaman and host for the spirit who uses powerful healing and offensive summon spells.
- Rodi – a ninja from Far East Village, and host for the spirit.
- Forte – a mercenary wizard possessed by an evil spirit for a while.
- Lisa – a mercenary paladin skilled in swordsmanship and support magic.
- Basso – a dragonman mercenary and companion of Lisa.
- Akane – a kunoichi and sister of Rodi.
- Doyle – a wolfman ninja who appears several times as an NPC, and later as a secret character.

=== Non-playable characters ===
- Rilix – a Vandal who secured a position as the king's advisor and court wizard; seeks the revival of the 1,000 year kingdom. One of the game's major antagonists.
- Sabato – A sage who served as the king's advisor and chancellor before being ousted by Rilix. He is responsible for summoning Galm back to the mortal realm, and in return Galm told him what would soon happen at Godspeak. Despite being stripped of his political power, Sabato seeks to manipulate the course of events so that good will triumph over evil.
- Lord of the Far East Village – An elder who serves as leader of Far East Village. He is also the father of Rodi and Akane, and adoptive father of Panzer. He provides help and advice for the party in their struggle against Rilix.
- Galm – the most powerful Vandal, yet for unknown reasons does not wish to see the 1,000 year kingdom revived, which puts him at odds with his brethren.
- Elise – Rilix's sister; like Galm, she doesn't seem too interested in reviving the 1,000 year kingdom.
- Panzer – a young Vandal from Far East Village, he seeks to revive the 1,000 year kingdom. One of the game's major antagonists.

== Development ==
The story of Shining the Holy Ark was designed with a more mature audience in mind than earlier games in the Shining series were targeted towards. In a 2009 interview, producer Hiroyuki Takahashi commented: "Until [Shining] Wisdom, the idea had been simply to develop a story that would attract a broad range of users. From Holy Ark on, the story and game were redesigned to focus on the Saturn players of the time. Japanese Saturn owners were generally in their late-teens or early-twenties. The age group had shifted away from children, so... the concept was 'fantasy that can be enjoyed by adults'. This new approach led to a darker, deeper world than we had been creating for the 'all ages' category prior to Holy Ark. We started to work on the plot of a story that would be appropriate in such a world." The game's soundtrack was composed by Motoi Sakuraba, who later wrote the music for Shining Force III.

The game was unveiled in August 1996 at the first Tokyo Game Show, with a 5% complete version on display.

== Reception ==
Reception

Aggregate score
Aggregator	Score
GameRankings	79%

Review scores
Publication	Score
Computer and Video Games	4/5
Edge	6/10
Electronic Gaming Monthly	7.75/10
Famitsu	8/10, 8/10, 8/10, 8/10
GameFan	274/300
GameRevolution	B
GameSpot	9.1/10
Hyper	73/100
Next Generation	4/5
RPGamer	4/5
RPGFan	82/100 (1999); 80/100 (2000)
Sega Saturn Magazine	93%

Though critical reactions to Shining the Holy Ark varied widely, nearly every review concluded with a strong recommendation to buy the game. Next Generation summarized, "Boasting some sharp, innovative graphics and interesting gameplay elements that haven't been widely used in traditional, turn-based RPGs, SHA truly shines." Rich Leadbetter of Sega Saturn Magazine called it "the best RPG I've played in ages." Trent Ward, reviewing for GameSpot, summed up that "There's nothing in Shining the Holy Ark that RPG fans haven't seen in one form or another before, but it does put them all together nicely." GamePro wrote "Shining the Holy Ark's hypnotic gameplay, supernatural story line, and spellbinding fun will pleasantly entrance you."

Reviewers overwhelmingly approved of the game's graphics. Crispin Boyer of Electronic Gaming Monthly said it has "some of the best animation ever seen in an RPG." He and his co-reviewer Dan Hsu both found the first-person perspective a refreshing change from the overhead perspective used in nearly every other RPG of the time. Next Generation instead stated that it is the game's particular combination of polygons and sprites that "gives SHA a high level of detail and a visual uniqueness that not only looks great during gameplay, but sets the title apart from the bulk of other recent games in the genre." GamePro commented that the "crisp, colorful sprites combine with creepy creatures and eye-catching spells to deliver a visually appealing adventure." Leadbetter was less enthusiastic about the graphics than most, saying that the villages are stunning but the dungeon designs are dull.

Reactions to the story were more mixed. While Leadbetter, Sushi-X of EGM, and GamePro all commented positively on it, Ward said it was generic and predictable, with the only saving grace being the solid English translation. Next Generation seconded Ward on these points, but added that the story was at least "deep enough to keep up a solid, substantial pace."

Commentary on the gameplay centered almost exclusively on the combat. Leadbetter remarked that the game features "a wealth of different adversaries, each with different capabilities that make each confrontation a different tactical challenge." Next Generation and Crispin Boyer of EGM both praised the pixie system as adding further depth to the game. However, Boyer, along with Ward, also said that the enemy animations often drag on too long, slowing the pace of battle. Ward still had an overall positive impression of the combat, and asserted that "The game is well balanced and provides a fighting challenge without making it impossible to win scenarios." EGM's Shawn Smith disagreed, saying the enemy types get increasingly hard too quickly. In contrast, GamePro said the fact that players do not lose any of the items they have acquired when their party is wiped out makes the game too easy.

In Germany, Shining the Holy Ark entered Karstadt's Saturn sales chart at number seven in June 1997. It rose to number one in July and remained at the top in August, before ranking third in September and sixth in October. In, the game ranked ninth on the magazine's Swedish retail sales chart in October 1997, compiled by Design Promotions from reports supplied by video game retailers. In Sweden, the game ranked ninth on the Swedish retail sales chart published in the October 1997 issue of the magazine Super Play. The chart was compiled by Design Promotions using reports supplied by video game retailers.

Shining the Holy Ark ranked fifth on the American multi-format sales chart published by Computer and Video Games in both its October and November 1997 issues.
