= Contact (video game) =

2006 video game

- North American box art
- Developer: Grasshopper Manufacture
- Publishers: JP: Marvelous Entertainment; NA: Atlus USA; PAL: Rising Star Games
- Director: Akira Ueda
- Producer: Takeshi Ogura
- Designer: Akira Ueda
- Artist: Atsuko Fukushima
- Writer: Akira Ueda
- Composers: Masafumi Takada; Jun Fukuda
- Platform: Nintendo DS
- Release: JP: March 30, 2006; NA: October 18, 2006; AU: January 25, 2007; EU: February 2, 2007
- Genre: Role-playing
- Modes: Single-player, multiplayer

Contact (Note: Japanese: コンタクト, Hepburn: Kontakuto) is a role-playing video game developed by Grasshopper Manufacture for the Nintendo DS handheld game console. It was published by Marvelous Entertainment in Japan on March 30, 2006, by Atlus USA in North America on October 18, and by Rising Star Games in Australia, Asia and Europe on January 25, 2007 and February 2, respectively.

== Plot ==
The story begins as a scientist, known as the Professor, flees through space from a mysterious enemy known only as the "CosmoNOTs" (Cosmic Nihilist Organization for Terror). He crash lands on a strange planet, losing the "cells" that power his ship. Without power, he is stranded. He enlists the help of Terry, a young boy. Terry agrees to help the Professor by exploring the planet and locating the cells. Helping the Professor is the only way that Terry will be able to get home, but the Klaxon Army are tracking them down, the cells are hidden in some dangerous areas and, as the game progresses, the Professor's intentions are slowly thrown deeper and deeper into question.

The player is included in the story-line as a separate character from Terry, and the game's characters recognize the player as "controlling" Terry using the DS, breaking the fourth wall, and assisting him through the use of 'decals' - sticker-like items that apply specific, often powerful effects. Throughout the game, the Professor will talk directly to the player to give hints on how to use the controls and to voice his concerns about Terry. The Professor is eager to keep the player's existence and their role in Terry's life a secret from the boy.

== Gameplay ==
The top screen shows the Professor's ship in a pixelated, isometric view, while the bottom screen, where Terry is situated, uses a hand-drawn graphical style.

In Contact, several atypical gameplay mechanics ensure a certain amount of alienation between the player, the Professor, and Terry. The Professor talks directly to the player, giving instructions in order to help Terry. Once battle mode is entered, Terry's attacking is essentially on autopilot - being done automatically provided the attack is not on cooldown, and Terry is within range of the enemy. The player can switch weapons, move Terry, and use items, decals, and skills, but the bulk of combat is out of the player's hands, and they essentially watch, waiting for the right moments to use their abilities, while Terry handles attacking on his own.

Unlike many RPGs, experience gain is instantaneous during battles, which complements the real time combat system. Rather than increasing multiple statistics at once, Contact's experience system increases Terry's statistics individually as he performs specific actions. For instance, when Terry takes damage, his defense increases; when he damages an enemy, his strength increases. There are other statistics that affect Terry's relationship with the game's non-playable characters, including fame, courage, and karma. The character can attack any NPC at will. As animosity towards Terry grows, townsfolk will attack Terry on the street or run when they see him. Weaker enemies also flee when Terry advances depending on his fame.

There is a costume system through which new skills can be learned. Up to eight costumes can be obtained, turning Terry into such forms as a fisherman, a chef, a thief, an "aqua shot", a car driver, a digger and a pilot. With greater use, a costume will add extra powers to its associated skills and statistics, including elemental magic and magical properties. Terry also has weapon-based skills. The weapons are divided into three different categories: punching (gloves), striking (clubs), and slashing (swords). Each skill can be upgraded by using each type of weapon throughout the game. Each enemy has its own weakness, so some of Contact's strategy involves switching to the appropriate weapon to exploit an enemy's weak point. The game also uses decals or stickers. The player can stick multiple decals to Terry, resulting in added powers. Decals can also be used to attack enemies, heal, and other functions.

There are many items to collect, a large number of which are food. Terry can combine foods in the cooking system while wearing the chef costume, which Terry can consume to replenish health and negate status ailments. Food and potions also require time to digest in Terry's gut and yield bonuses which vary depending on the kind of item, in addition to the digestion time varying, so timing is a factor when using these items in battle.

The game contains a number of side-quests. While none of these are necessary to complete the game, certain costumes cannot be obtained without completing a particular side-quest. The game additionally made use of the Nintendo Wi-Fi Connection. During Contact Mode, the player could exchange friend codes with another player and make contact with one another. In the single player adventure, upon reaching the WiFisland, all friends who have been contacted through friend codes appeared as non-playable characters, sharing tips and items. Up to 8 players could be stored as NPCs in the WiFisland.

== Development ==
Contact was developed by Grasshopper Manufacture as the company's first RPG on the DS. The game's main designer and director, Akira Ueda, a former Square graphic designer and a prominent contributor to the Shining Soul games, described the game's main story line as providing a "framework of diversions" such as combat, item collection, and monster hunting. The game uses the touchscreen in several ways through the game. According to Ueda: "We've endeavoured to use as many of the DS' features as we could, but not in an obvious way. Our philosophy was 'How can we use these fantastic features properly?' We wanted them to work for the story rather than dictate it, which is something we feel is incredibly important for an original concept like Contact".

Contact features Apple IIe-style fonts on its title screen and 8-bit mini-games. However, the main graphical draw of Contact is its contrast in art styles between the two DS screens. A simple, pixelated style makes up the top screen, while the bottom screen has a pre-rendered, detailed art style. These styles clash when the Professor transitions from one screen to the other. Ueda originally developed the game for the Game Boy Advance; producer Takeshi Ogura revealed that the two art styles were to switch back and forth. When development moved to the DS, the team decided to take advantage of the dual screens by showing them simultaneously. According to Ueda, this differentiation "underlines how the player and the Professor are aliens to each other. They must make contact, communicate and co-operate to make it through the game" and "creates feelings of nostalgia; just like the interplay between the 'real' and 'game' worlds".

Contact was picked up for a North American release by Atlus USA prior to its Japanese launch. The company's localization director, Tomm Hulett, was attracted to the game's art style and humor, comparing it to the cult-classic EarthBound. As per the company's translation policy, the game's content was not altered from the original Japanese release beyond the English localisation. This was a slight challenge. According to Hulett, it was difficult to figure out which parts of the dialogue were serious and which were comical. Also, the files did not show which character was speaking, which was a problem when multiple characters conversed.

== Release ==
In September 2005, a flash animation prior to the release of Contact was created on Marvelous' website. It was a countdown of roughly a week, and featured the Professor, then called "Doctor", tapping on a chalk board. Due to the similarities between the Professor and Doctor Andonuts from the SNES RPG EarthBound, fans of the game were led to believe the timer was counting down to an announcement for the previously cancelled sequel to EarthBound, Mother 3. The rumour was later proven to be false when the Professor appeared in a Famitsu article unveiling Contact, rather than Mother 3.

== Reception ==
Reception

Aggregate score
Aggregator	Score
Metacritic	73/100

Review scores
Publication	Score
Edge	7/10
Electronic Gaming Monthly	7.5/10 (Note: Three critics of Electronic Gaming Monthly gave the game each a score of 7.5/10, 7/10, and 8/10.)
Eurogamer	7/10
Famitsu	33/40
Game Informer	7/10
GameSpot	6.7/10
GameSpy	3/5
GameZone	8.5/10
IGN	(US) 7.5/10 (UK) 6.5/10
Nintendo Power	6.5/10
Pocket Gamer	3/5
RPGamer	3.5/5
RPGFan	73%

According to Media Create, Contact performed poorly on the Japanese market with just 8,102 units sold during its first week on sale and a total of 25,413 units sold by the end of 2006. Atlus suspects that the game suffered from low sales in the region due to the game's concurrent release with the highly anticipated handheld title Mother 3.

The game received "average" reviews according to the review aggregation website Metacritic. In Japan, Famitsu gave it scores of nine, seven, eight, and nine for a total of 33 out of 40. Gamebrink compared the statistics and level systems to games like Oblivion. The site praised the story, job system and, especially, the music, but defined the battles as "fairly shallow". In contrast, Nintendo Power's major complaints were that the game was "frustrating" due to its objectives as "obtuse" and "unintuitive", in addition to its difficulty. GamePro said of the game, "For those with patience, a good sense of direction, and an interest in the obscure, you owe it to yourself to try the game out. If you have a short temper or enjoy the mundane, it's best you avoid making contact with this one." (Note: GamePro gave the game two 4/5 scores for graphics and fun factor, 3.75/5 for sound, and 3.5/5 for control.)

== Sequel ==
Ueda claimed during a 2006 interview between Gamasutra and developer Grasshopper Manufacture that he was working on a sequel to Contact. When asked again in 2011 about a sequel, Ueda responded that he was ready to work with Suda on a follow-up game despite the original's lack of success. Ueda explained: "Regardless of the business aspects of making a sequel, I think the world would be a better place if there was another Contact game in existence!" The game has yet to be officially announced.
