= Shining Force II =

1993 video game

- European box art
- Developer: Sonic! Software Planning
- Publisher: Sega
- Directors: Shugo Takahashi; Yasuhiro Taguchi
- Producer: Hiroyuki Takahashi
- Artists: Fumihide Aoki; Masayuki Hashimoto
- Composer: Motoaki Takenouchi
- Series: Shining
- Platform: Sega Genesis
- Release: JP: October 1, 1993; NA: 1994; EU: September 1994
- Genre: Tactical role-playing
- Mode: Single-player

Shining Force II (シャイニング・フォースII 古えの封印, Shainingu Fōsu Tsū: Inishie no Fūin; lit. "Shining Force II: The Ancient Seal") is a 1993 tactical role-playing game developed by Sonic! Software Planning and published by Sega for the Sega Genesis. Its storyline is not directly connected to the original Shining Force, although the Game Gear title Shining Force Gaiden: Final Conflict links the two games' plots. The game is much longer than Shining Force, and contains more free roaming. There is no chapter system, so the player can return to previously visited parts of the world. There are also two different ways of promoting certain characters.

Shining Force II was met with positive reviews and acclaim during its initial release, with critics citing it as superior to its predecessor for its straightforward storyline and charming characters. Amongst critics, the game is often regarded as one of the best RPGs of all time, and a highlighted title for the Sega Genesis. After the game's initial release, Shining Force II saw re-releases and remasters on consoles and PCs. It was released on the Wii Virtual Console in Europe on October 3, 2008, and in North America on October 6, 2008, and on the Nintendo Classics service on April 21, 2022. The game was also released for iOS and Android devices in October 2018, and for Microsoft Windows in 2011. It also appears in several game compilations, including Sonic's Ultimate Genesis Collection for Xbox 360 and PlayStation 3 and Sega Genesis Classics for the Nintendo Switch, PlayStation 4, and Xbox One.

== Gameplay ==

Top: Sarah preparing to attack.
Bottom: Sarah defeating a Gizmo.

Shining Force II is a tactical role-playing game. The player assumes the role of the Shining Force leader, Bowie. When not in combat, the player can explore towns and other locales, talk with people, and set the members and equipment of the army. Some towns have a headquarters where the player can inspect and talk with his allies. While roaming through town or moving throughout the world, one can find both visible and hidden treasures and interact with certain objects.

Each ally unit is represented by a character with a background and personality. Some of these characters are hidden, requiring specific events to occur before they will join the force. Each ally unit also has a class, which defines the abilities for that unit. These abilities range from what type of weapons they can use to what kind of spells they can learn. Units can become stronger by fighting enemies and performing various actions which give them experience points (EXP), which allow them to gain levels. Once a unit reaches level 20, that character has the ability to advance to a more powerful class through promotion. Some characters have two different classes they may be promoted to, one of which is only accessible using a special hidden item.

Battles take place on a square grid, and each unit occupies a single square. Battles are turn-based. Each turn, a character can move and perform one action: either attack, cast a spell, or use an item. Some commands, such as equipping or dropping an item during the turn, do not count as actions.

The battle is won if all enemies are defeated, or if the enemy commander is defeated. If Bowie is defeated in combat or withdraws, the battle is lost and the player is returned to the nearest town, where he can recover his allies and fight the same battle again.

== Plot ==
In a shrine south of Granseal Castle, a thief named Slade unwittingly breaks the power of a magic seal by stealing the jewels of Light and Darkness; this unseals the demon king Zeon trapped therein. The following day, King Granseal falls sick when he is attacked by an unknown creature. Sir Astral, the court's adviser, along with his apprentices, Bowie the squire, Sarah the healer and Chester the knight, investigate these events at the castle. They find that the door to the Tower of Ancients has been unlocked and stands open.

Greeting their arrival in the tower are devils named "Gizmos" springing forth to attack, though their ultimate intentions are unknown. Upon their defeat, the Gizmo that appears to be the leader flees. It is discovered thereafter to have possessed King Granseal. Sir Astral and the nascent Shining Force visit the king, finding him possessed. Sir Astral exorcises the demon, which promptly flees. The Minister, in place of King Granseal who is looking over a fainted Astral, then orders the slaying of the Gizmo by a platoon of Granseal's soldiers. The Gizmo subsequently possesses the king of the neighboring kingdom of Galam. Bowie and his friends are captured by the Galam military: while in their dungeon, they meet the thief, Slade. When the party breaks out, Slade helps Bowie retrieve the Jewel of Light and accompanies his party back to Granseal, which has been invaded by Galam forces. They find the possessed King Galam inside the Ancient Tower, who has taken Princess Elis as a hostage. In the ensuing battle, Bowie wrests the Jewel of Darkness from him, but he is unable to rescue Elis, and the ground around the Ancient Tower collapses.

The people of Granseal are forced to resettle on the continent of Parmecia. It is here that the true nature of the threat is revealed, so Bowie and friends must now travel across Parmecia to gather allies, solve the riddle of the Jewels, obtain the Force Sword, and seal away Zeon once more.

== Shining series continuity ==
Shining Force II takes place sometime roughly 55 years after Shining Force Gaiden: Final Conflict, and is set in the same lands of Parmecia and Grans. The story focuses on the bid for freedom of Zeon, the devil who helped defeat Darksol in Final Conflict, and it is explained how Zeon's rivalry with Darksol began. Zeon's chief follower Oddeye also plays a major role and meets his final fate.

The nation of Granseal, founded at the conclusion of Final Conflict, is flourishing. Hawel is still living in the town he pledged to establish in Final Conflict, and has sired several children; one of them, Chaz, joins the Shining Force II party. He also passes on information concerning the Devil Kings that he learned in Final Conflict, and a student of his called Kazin joins the party in the early stages of the story. The gods Volcanon and Mitula again play a hand in matters. Artifacts from Final Conflict such as the Caravan and Nazca Ship make return appearances, and several monsters, most notably the Kraken, still terrorize the lands.

Additionally, the game Shining Wisdom is a sequel of sorts to Shining Force II. Shining Force II tells how Sarah and Kazin ("Salah" and "Parn" in the Working Designs translation) became traveling companions and recounts the full story of the Parmecia War referred to several times in Shining Wisdom.

== Translation issues ==
The three Devil Kings are named in the game as "Dark Sol, Dark Dragon, and Zeon". Fan translators have since uncovered (and Shining Force II co-director/programmer Yasuhiro Taguchi has confirmed) that the Devil Kings are in fact Darksol, Lucifer, and Zeon. The official translation's assigning Dark Sol and Dark Dragon the identity of the Devil Kings creates contradictions with other games in the series. For instance, in the original Shining Force, Darksol is trying to resurrect Dark Dragon (who is implied to be a creation of the Ancients, not a devil at all), while Shining Force II tells that the three Devil Kings are fierce arch-rivals. In addition, Shining Force Gaiden: Final Conflict is based on Darksol's role as a Devil King and shows "Dark Sol" (actually "Mephisto" in the original script, and an entirely different character from Darksol) being born less than a century before Shining Force II.

== Development ==
Despite being the fifth game in the successful Shining series, Sega allotted the same budget for Shining Force II as it had for the first game in the series, Shining in the Darkness. Additionally, producer/co-programmer Hiroyuki Takahasi remarked in a 2009 interview that "We were in a really precarious position at that point because we knew that if we couldn't produce another hit we would have no future." As a result, most of the Shining series development team dropped out and had to be replaced with new staff for the production of Shining Force II. Takahashi summarized the game as "an experimental title where we improved the story and enhanced the game's 'RPG-ness'."

Shining Force II's planning and development was intertwined with first two Shining Force Gaiden games. Hiroyuki Takahashi stated that his and certain Sonic staff members' center of attention would, at times, shift between working on Shining Force Gaiden, Shining Force Gaiden II and Shining Force II.

== Reception ==
Reception

Aggregate score
| Aggregator | Score |
|---|---|
| GameRankings | 89% |

Review score
| Publication | Score |
|---|---|
| Electronic Gaming Monthly | 7/10, 6/10, 7/10, 7/10, 7/10 |

Award
| Publication | Award |
|---|---|
| VideoGames | Best Role-Playing Game (runner-up) |

Shining Force II was a best-seller in Japan.

GamePro panned the game, saying that the cheerful and upbeat soundtrack is out of place, the menu system is confusing, the style is too RPG-generic, and the use of turn-based instead of real-time combat makes battles "slow and cumbersome". Electronic Gaming Monthly's Mike Weigand commented that the story "could use a few more twists and turns", but that the music is good, the control configuration is very user-friendly, and the game improves on the first Shining Force with bigger areas to explore. He summarized that "This will definitely appeal to fans of the first one, and to RPG fans in general." Stan Hojnacki of the Santa Cruz Sentinel recommended the game, describing it as "a worthy sequel to a popular first edition."

In 1997, Electronic Gaming Monthly listed it as the 60th best console video game of all time, citing the compelling story and the cerebral challenge of the battles. In 2007, IGN named it one of the top 100 video games of all time at number 48, citing its refreshing simplicity among tactical RPGs and its underlying challenge, and Retro Gamer included it among the top ten Mega Drive games.
