= Rolo to the Rescue =

1993 video game

- North American cover art
- Developer: Vectordean
- Publisher: Electronic Arts
- Platform: Sega Mega Drive/Genesis
- Release: EU: January 1993; NA: February 1993
- Genre: Platform
- Mode: Single-player

Rolo to the Rescue is a video game developed by British studio Vectordean and published by Electronic Arts for the Sega Mega Drive/Genesis, released in 1993. The game is a two-dimensional action game with platforming elements, starring Rolo the elephant. Several other animal characters are playable once Rolo rescues them.

== Premise and gameplay ==
In-game screenshot

In Rolo to the Rescue the player controls, Rolo, a young elephant. The objective is to traverse through levels with varying terrain, rescue Rolo's captive friends along the way and his mother from the circus. Players can move Rolo left to right and can make Rolo jump. Power ups can give Rolo unique abilities. For example, obtaining a water sprayer allows Rolo to shoot water out of his trunk, a vacuum allows him to suck in small objects into his trunk and shoot it out, a helium tank allows Rolo to be filled with air and float in the air, and a washing machine allows Rolo to shrink and reach areas inaccessible at normal size.

Levels are shown in a map from a top-down perspective and designed in the shape of a jigsaw-puzzle board. Unlocked levels are revealed as jigsaw puzzle pieces and completed levels have animal paw prints stamped on them. Levels are completed by unlocking and reaching the goal. Goals are represented by sign posts and when they are unlocked, a compass rose will appear on the goal. The goal's primary method of being unlocked is by defeating the Ring Master and obtaining his key and freeing all the caged animal friends within the level. Some levels provide alternate methods for unlocking goals like obtaining a hidden puzzle piece somewhere within the level or reaching an alternate goal post. These alternate methods unlock more additional levels.

Once a captive animal is rescued, it will join Rolo's party with a maximum of three animal companions. If more than three are rescued, the earliest recruited animal companion that joined will leave the party and be replaced by the latest. Players can switch between the animal companions. Each animal companion type has their own unique abilities. For example, the rabbit is able to jump very high, the squirrel can climb, the mole can dig, and the beaver can swim. When an animal party member is being controlled, Rolo and the other remaining companions will be idle. If the animal companion takes damage under control of the player, it will faint and the party and be switched immediately back to Rolo. If Rolo receives damage and has party member, he will lose a party member instead. If Rolo receives damage without a party member he will lose a life instead.

== Reception ==
MegaTech awarded the game 89%, while Mega placed the game at #31 in their Top Mega Drive Games of All Time.
