= Shining (video game series) =

Series of fantasy console games by Sega

- Genre: Role-playing
- Developers: Climax Entertainment; Sonic! Software Planning; Camelot Software Planning; Nextech; Grasshopper Manufacture; Amusement Vision; Neverland; Flight-Plan; Media.Vision; Studio Saizensen
- Publishers: Sega; Atlus; Infogrames Entertainment, SA; THQ
- Platform: various
- First release: Shining in the Darkness; 29 March 1991
- Latest release: Shining Resonance Refrain; 29 March 2018

Shining (シャイニング, Shainingu) is a series of role-playing video games published by Sega, who owns the property. The first game, Shining in the Darkness, was a first-person dungeon crawler with randomly encountered, turn-based battles (comparable to Wizardry and Might and Magic). The next game released in the series was Shining Force, which was a turn-based strategy style tactical role-playing game with battle scenes acted out with sprites (comparable to Fire Emblem). Other directions include Shining Soul, a dungeon crawl action role-playing game with roguelike elements, and a number of traditional Japanese role-playing games. Shining Resonance Refrain was released on PlayStation 4, Xbox One, Steam PC and Nintendo Switch worldwide across 2018.

== Dungeon crawler titles ==
In the dungeon crawler titles of the series (Shining in the Darkness and Shining the Holy Ark), the player takes control of an adventuring party. Battles work very similarly to those of Dragon Quest, Mother, Shin Megami Tensei, and the fellow Sega RPG series Phantasy Star, in that they are first person and the player is placed in a position where the hero and team mates would be. Shining in the Darkness is the first game in the Shining series, and is a very simple labyrinth exploration game, with a simplified non explorable town and world map, where choices are made through a cursor system. Shining the Holy Ark was released immediately prior to Shining Force III, and while it is also a dungeon crawler, it features a far more expanded gameplay world over the first title.

== Strategy titles ==
For the strategy games of the series (Shining Force, Shining Force Gaiden, Shining Force Gaiden 2, Shining Force II, Shining Force Gaiden: Final Conflict, Shining Force CD, Shining Force III and Shining Force Feather), the player takes charge of a party in large-scale, strategic battles. The games generally limit the number of characters who can enter any one battle at a time to about a dozen. The player controls unique characters with their own stats, as opposed to generic unit types.

== Action role-playing titles ==
The third broad category of Shining games is the action role-playing game set of titles. This incorporates: Shining Wisdom, Shining Soul, Shining Soul II, Shining Force Neo, Shining Tears, Shining Force EXA, Shining Wind, Shining Force Cross and Shining Resonance. The games it incorporates do not necessarily have any noticeable similarity in gameplay. For instance, while Shining Tears uses similar mechanics to Shining Soul II, it has less in common with Shining Wisdom than it does with any of the strategy RPG titles of the series.

On 3 December 2009, Shining Force Cross was released as an arcade game for Sega's RingEdge system board. It is a multiplayer role-playing game with support for up to eight players, both online and offline. Within one month, nearly 2,400 Shining Force Cross machines had been sold to arcade operators by 31 December 2009. A sequel has been released for the RingEdge arcade system in 2012, Shining Force Cross Illusion.

== Connections between games ==
Each game in the series has a standalone story, meaning that it is not required to play its predecessors to better understand its storyline. Nevertheless, most installments of the series prior to Shining Soul I often reference each other or have characters carried over. For example, in Shining Wisdom, the elf-cleric Sarah and elf-mage Kazin from Shining Force II make an important appearance. Shining Force Gaiden: Final Conflict and Shining Force II are two of the most related games, having the largest number of characters and locations in common.

From Shining Soul I onward, installments of the series tend to have less significant connections. For instance, in Shining Tears a character mentions the Klantol Kingdom (the setting for Shining Soul II) and tells its geographic location, but there is no interaction with any of the characters or plot events of Shining Soul II. However, Shining Wind and Shining Tears are some of the most closely connected pair of games in the series, since the former is a direct sequel to the latter and features return appearances by nearly all of the major characters.

== Development history and reboot ==
=== Early history ===
Game producer Hiroyuki Takahashi left Enix with fellow Dragon Quest developer Kan Naito in April 1990 to found the game development studio Climax Entertainment. Under a production contract with Sega, Climax developed Shining in the Darkness, which was released for the Mega Drive in March 1991. With funding from Sega to continue work on the Shining series, Takahashi would register the studio Sonic! Software Planning as a subsidiary of Sega. Sonic supported Climax in the development of Shining Force and afterward become the primary developer of the series with credits for Shining Force II, Shining Force CD, and the Game Gear games Shining Force Gaiden, Shining Force Gaiden II, and Shining Force Gaiden: Final Conflict.

Hiroyuki Takahashi's brother, Shugo Takahashi, founded Camelot Software Planning as an independent studio in April 1994 in order to develop games for Sony's PlayStation, but Camelot would also provide development support to Sonic for Shining Wisdom, Shining the Holy Ark, and Shining Force III. By 1998, Sonic had ceased operations, and Sega's Shining brand would not be used for any new games until 2002.

=== Reboot by Sega ===
After Sega quit the hardware market, it was decided to reboot the Shining franchise. In charge of the so called "Shining Project" was Sega employee Tadashi Takezaki, who joined marketing in 1993 and in 2004, and was not only in charge of the Shining series, but also the Sakura Wars franchise. According to Takezaki, when you think of Sega RPG's, you think of Phantasy Star and Shining. While Phantasy Star never strictly had a fifth main entry, it was rebooted in the form of Phantasy Star Online. The Shining series never had an entry on the Dreamcast, due to various developers being busy with other projects and it being thought that it would be better to launch a new RPG instead, among other reasons. However, looking at the Japanese video game market, RPG's have the largest marketshare, so Sega decided to go ahead and restart the franchise, with a long-term plan, which included providing one game a year. This was new for Sega, people across different departments came together in 2001 to form what was called the "Shining Committee". The Committee included Takezaki himself, but also Youichi Shimosato who produced Shining Force: Resurrection of the Dark Dragon and Shining Force Neo, and also Tsuyoshi Sawada who produced Shining Tears. While the "Force" games were meant to harken back to the earlier titles, Tears was made from a completely blank slate for a modern audience, and looked at the Shining series from a new angle, much like Phantasy Star Online did.

== Games ==
| Title | Release date | Platform | Notes |
|---|---|---|---|
| Shining in the Darkness | 28 March 1991 | Mega Drive | |
| Shining in the Darkness | 12 June 2007 | Wii Virtual Console | |
| Shining in the Darkness | 26 January 2011 | Windows | |
| Shining in the Darkness | 2019 | iOS | Released as part of Shining Force Classics |
| Shining Force | 19 March 1992 | Mega Drive | |
| Shining Force | 10 July 2007 | Wii Virtual Console | |
| Shining Force | 8 August 2010 | iOS | |
| Shining Force | 26 January 2011 | Windows | |
| Shining Force Gaiden | 25 December 1992 | Game Gear | Never released outside Japan. Remade as part of Shining Force CD. |
| Shining Force Gaiden | 2 October 2013 | 3DS Virtual Console | Never released outside Japan. Remade as part of Shining Force CD. |
| Shining Force Gaiden | 2019 | iOS | Released as part of Shining Force Classics |
| Shining Force: The Sword of Hajya | 25 June 1993 | Game Gear | Released in Japan as Shining Force Gaiden II. Remade as part of Shining Force CD. |
| Shining Force: The Sword of Hajya | 6 November 2013 | 3DS Virtual Console | Released in Japan as Shining Force Gaiden II. Remade as part of Shining Force CD. |
| Shining Force II | 1 October 1993 | Mega Drive | |
| Shining Force II | 11 July 2008 | Wii Virtual Console | |
| Shining Force II | 26 January 2011 | Windows | |
| Shining Force II | 2019 | iOS | Released as part of Shining Force Classics |
| Shining Force CD | 21 July 1994 | Mega-CD | Contains remakes of Shining Force Gaiden I and II and a new scenario. |
| Shining Force Gaiden: Final Conflict | 30 June 1995 | Game Gear | Never officially released in English; however, fan translations are available. |
| Shining Force Gaiden: Final Conflict | 15 January 2014 | 3DS Virtual Console | Japan only |
| Shining Wisdom | 10 August 1995 | Saturn | |
| Shining the Holy Ark | 20 December 1996 | Saturn | |
| Shining Force III Scenario 1 | 11 December 1997 | Saturn | Released in the US and Europe as Shining Force III. |
| Shining Force III Scenario 2 | 29 April 1998 | Saturn | Never officially released in English; however, fan translations are available. |
| Shining Force III Scenario 3 | 23 September 1998 | Saturn | Never officially released in English; however, fan translations are available. |
| Shining Force III Premium Disk | 3 December 1998 | Saturn | Never officially released in English; however, fan translations are available. |
| Shining Soul | 28 March 2002 | Game Boy Advance | This was the first game developed by Grasshopper Manufacture (all previous ones were developed by Camelot Software); all games from this point onward are not part of the same continuity as the pre-Soul games. |
| Shining Soul II | 24 July 2003 | Game Boy Advance | |
| Shining Force: Resurrection of the Dark Dragon | 30 April 2004 | Game Boy Advance | An enhanced remake of the original Shining Force, with a revised story, new battles, and new characters. |
| Shining Tears | 3 November 2004 | PlayStation 2 | Character designs by Tony Taka. |
| Shining Force Neo | 24 March 2005 | PlayStation 2 | |
| Shining Road to the Force | 14 April 2005 | Japanese mobile phones | The first non-remake strategy Shining game in over seven years. |
| Shining Force Chronicle I | 26 April 2005 | Japanese mobile phones | Remake of Shining Force Gaiden. |
| Shining Force Chronicle I | 24 October 2011 | Android | Remake of Shining Force Gaiden. |
| Shining Force Chronicle II | 3 October 2005 | Japanese mobile phones | Remake of Shining Force: The Sword of Hajya. |
| Shining Force Chronicle II | 8 December 2011 | Android | Remake of Shining Force: The Sword of Hajya. |
| Shining Road Priestess of the Dark Dragon | 27 January 2006 | Japanese mobile phones | |
| Shining Force Chronicle III | 27 June 2006 | Japanese mobile phones | Remake of Shining Force Gaiden: Final Conflict. |
| Shining Force Chronicle III | 24 May 2012 | Android | Remake of Shining Force Gaiden: Final Conflict. |
| Shining Force EXA | 18 January 2007 | PlayStation 2 | |
| Shining Wind | 17 May 2007 | PlayStation 2 | Follow-up to Shining Tears. Character designs by Tony Taka. |
| Shining Force EXA Mobile | 10 July 2007 | Japanese mobile phones | |
| Shining Wind X | 1 December 2008 | Japanese mobile phones | Enhanced version of Shining Wind. |
| Shining Force Feather | 19 February 2009 | Nintendo DS | Japan only |
| Shining Force Cross | 3 December 2009 | Arcade | |
| Shining Hearts | 16 December 2010 | PlayStation Portable | Characters designed by Tony Taka. |
| Shining Blade | 15 March 2012 | PlayStation Portable | Characters designed by Tony Taka. |
| Shining Ark | 28 February 2013 | PlayStation Portable | Characters designed by Tony Taka. |
| Blade Arcus from Shining | 5 November 2014 | Arcade | Character designs by Tony Taka. |
| Blade Arcus from Shining | 28 July 2016 | Windows | |
| Shining Resonance | 11 December 2014 | PlayStation 3 | Character designs by Tony Taka. |
| Blade Arcus from Shining EX | 26 November 2015 | PlayStation 3 PlayStation 4 | |
| Blade Arcus from Shining: Battle Arena | 28 July 2016 | Windows | |
| Shining Resonance Refrain | 10 July 2018 | Windows; Nintendo Switch; PlayStation 4 Xbox One | Enhanced port of Shining Resonance; unlike the original PlayStation 3 release, this version was available worldwide. First game in the series for an Xbox console. |
| Blade Arcus Rebellion from Shining | 14 March 2019 | PlayStation 4 Nintendo Switch | Enhanced port of Blade Arcus from Shining with the addition of extra characters from Shining Resonance Refrain. |

== Cancelled games ==
| Title | Initial release date | Platform | Notes |
|---|---|---|---|
| Shining Force: Heroes of Light and Darkness | 2022 | Android; IOS | Enhanced remake that contains Shining Force, Shining Force II and Shining Force CD that would be developed by HIVE with collaboration by Vespa. The game has been cancelled due to 90% of layoffs from Vespa inc., numerous of delays, and low funding for the game. |

== In other media ==
The events of Shining Force II were loosely adapted for a storyline in the UK publication Sonic the Comic, titled "The Curse of Zeon". The series was written by Nigel Kitching, with art by Martin Griffiths and Gina Hart, and ran for six parts in 1996.

== Reception ==
The Shining Force installments of the series were the first tactical role-playing games to have significant success in the U.S.

In 1996, Next Generation listed the Genesis and Sega CD entries of the series (but not Shining Wisdom or any of the Game Gear installments) collectively as number 77 on their "Top 100 Games of All Time". They lauded the series for replacing the then-standard generic RPG encounters with story-based battles, using an exciting character class system, and having brilliant pacing that keeps the games from ever dragging.

== See also ==
- Landstalker and Crusader of Centy, both used the working title "Shining Rogue" during development
