= Akira Ueda =

Japanese video game designer

Akira Ueda (上田 晃, Ueda Akira) is a Japanese video game designer, director, graphical artist, and composer. After previously working for several notable companies, he currently designs games from his own company Audio, Inc.

== Career ==
Ueda was born in 1970 in Tokyo, Japan. He moved to Urayasu, Chiba at the age of 10. As a teenager, he took a part-time job at Tokyo Disney Resort, where he worked until 1988, when he attended Tokyo Design Academy. He was hired by Square in 1990.

At Square, Ueda worked mostly as a background and map designer, most prominently on Super Mario RPG. In 1995, he joined co-worker Kenichi Nishi and others in the establishment of the independent developer Love-de-Lic, where Ueda carried over his responsibilities from Square in the design of the company's first two releases. In 1999, Ueda left Love-de-Lic and joined Grasshopper Manufacture. He continued to design backgrounds and maps, but his debut as a director came with the two Shining Soul games released for the Game Boy Advance. He was also directed and acted as the main designer for Contact on the Nintendo DS.

Ueda left Grasshopper Manufacture in 2005 and founded Audio, Inc. the following January. The company currently consists of Ueda and 8 other individuals. So far, the company has made several Japan-exclusive releases on the DS, including its most recent game, Sakura Note: Ima ni Tsunagaru Mirai.

== Works ==
Year	Title	Role
1991	Final Fantasy IV	Sound effects
1993	Secret of Mana	Background and map design
1996	Super Mario RPG	Background and map design
1997	Moon: Remix RPG Adventure	Background and map design, planning
1999	UFO: A Day in the Life	Background and map design
2001	Flower, Sun, and Rain	3D map design
2002	Shining Soul	Director, background and map design
2003	Shining Soul II	Director, background and map design
2004	Michigan: Report from Hell	Director
2006	Contact	Director, planning, scenario, background and map design
2007	Deltora Quest: Nanatsu no Houseki	
2008	Majin Tantei Nōgami Neuro: Neuro to Miko no Bishoku Sanmai	
2009	Sakura Note: Ima ni Tsunagaru Mirai	Designer
2012	Paper Mario: Sticker Star	Planning
2013	The Denpa Men 2: Beyond the Waves	UI design
2013	Megpoid the Music	UI design
2013	Fantasy Life Link	UI design
