= Shining Force Feather =

2009 video game

- Developer: Flight-Plan
- Publisher: Sega
- Producer: Yoichi Shimosato
- Artists: pako Noizi Ito
- Series: Shining
- Platform: Nintendo DS
- Release: JP: February 19, 2009
- Genre: Tactical RPG
- Mode: Single-player

Shining Force Feather (シャイニング・フォース フェザー, Shainingu Fōsu Fezā) is a turn-based tactical role-playing game developed by Flight-Plan and published by Sega. It is the 20th entry in the Shining series (not counting remakes) and was released in Japan on February 19, 2009. Produced by Yoichi Shimosato and featuring character designs by Noizi Ito and movie cutscenes made by famous animation studio Studio Hibari, it was the only Shining Force game to be released on the Nintendo DS.

== Gameplay ==
Shining Force Feather features a turn-based strategic battle system with an overhead perspective. Once an enemy is selected for attack, the game switches to a side perspective. This phase takes place in real time, as the player presses buttons to activate various attacks. In addition to solo attacks, the battle system will allow players to team up their forces for combination attacks. Rather than being grid based, like many earlier Shining titles, the player is granted with much more liberty as to where to place a unit within a circular range shown during each turn.

== Plot ==
3,000 Years ago, a war between the Shining Force warriors and enemy forces known as the Kyomu plunged the world into chaos. That war is remembered primarily in items known as artifacts, which were sealed away after the war. 3,000 years later, a young Treasure Hunter named Jin and his friend Bail discover a hidden ruin where a lost artifact is found and accidentally awaken an android girl named Alfin. A new adventure in search for lost artifacts has just begun.
