= Hiroyuki Takahashi (game producer) =

President of Camelot Software Planning

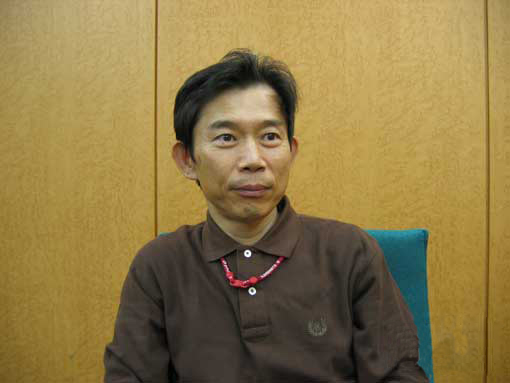
- Takahashi in 2005
- Born: October 30, 1957 (age 68); Tokyo, Japan
- Occupations: Game producer, game designer
- Employer: Camelot (1994–present)
- Known for: Shining series Golden Sun series Mario sports games

Hiroyuki Takahashi (Japanese: 高橋 宏之, born October 30, 1957) is the president of the video game development studio Camelot Software Planning. He has participated in most of the company's projects as a game designer, producer, and writer.

== Career ==
Hiroyuki Takahashi started his career in video game production as an employee at Enix, where his work on the Dragon Quest franchise included roles as assistant producer on Dragon Quest IV and executive producer for the North American release of Dragon Warrior II.

Takahashi left Enix and in April 1990 founded the game development studio Climax Entertainment alongside Kan Naito, the chief programmer of Dragon Quest III and Dragon Quest IV at Chunsoft. Takahashi and Naito were also joined by two former Enix freelancers, artist Yoshitaka Tamaki and programmer Yasuhiro Taguchi. Climax's first project was Shining in the Darkness for the Sega Mega Drive, a game which Takahashi wrote and produced.

On June 12, 1991, Takahashi registered a new game company, Sonic! Software Planning, with an 85 percent investment from Sega Enterprises to develop further role-playing games for the Mega Drive. The studio was named after Sonic the Hedgehog, a Sega mascot character whose first game would release that month.

Sonic supported Climax in the development of the first Shining Force, for which Takahashi has design, production, and writing credits. After Climax's departure from the series, Sonic became the primary developer of subsequent Shining games, which Takahashi would continue to produce.

In April 1994, Hiroyuki Takahashi's brother, Shugo Takahashi, founded Camelot Software Planning as an independent studio to develop games for Sony's PlayStation starting with Beyond the Beyond. Camelot would also support Sonic in the development of games in the Shining series including Shining Wisdom and Shining the Holy Ark. After the release of the latter, Sega merged its investment in Sonic into its subsidiary Nextech, and Hiroyuki Takahashi moved to Camelot, where he became president during the development of Shining Force III.

In late 1998, Sega began focusing their resources on the Dreamcast, leaving Sonic with its last scenario for Shining Force III for the Sega Saturn in jeopardy. After the project was complete, Camelot formed a partnership with Nintendo.

Since working with Nintendo, Camelot has developed many Mario sports games, mainly related to golf and tennis. They have also developed the Golden Sun series of role-playing games.

== Ludography ==
Year	Title	Role
1990	Dragon Quest IV	Assistant producer
1990	Dragon Warrior II	Executive producer
1991	Shining in the Darkness	Producer, scenario
1992	Shining Force	Producer, game designer, scenario
1992	Shining Force Gaiden	Producer, scenario
1993	Shining Force: The Sword of Hajya	Producer, scenario
1993	Shining Force II	Producer, programmer
1995	Shining Wisdom	Producer, map designer, scenario
1996	Shining the Holy Ark	Producer, game designer
1997	Shining Force III Scenario 1	Producer, game designer, scenario
1998	Shining Force III Scenario 2	Producer, game designer, scenario
1998	Shining Force III Scenario 3	Producer, game designer, scenario
1999	Mario Golf	Producer, lead game designer
2000	Mario Tennis	Producer, lead game designer
2001	Golden Sun	Producer, game designer, scenario
2002	Golden Sun: The Lost Age	Producer, game designer, scenario
2003	Mario Golf: Toadstool Tour	Producer, lead game designer
2004	Mario Golf: Advance Tour	Producer, game designer, scenario
2004	Mario Power Tennis	Producer, lead game designer
2005	Mario Tennis: Power Tour	Producer, lead game designer, scenario
2007	We Love Golf!	Producer, lead game designer
2010	Golden Sun: Dark Dawn	Producer, game designer, scenario
2012	Mario Tennis Open	Producer, lead game designer
2014	Mario Golf: World Tour	Producer, lead game designer, scenario
2015	Mario Tennis: Ultra Smash	Producer, lead game designer
2017	Mario Sports Superstars	Producer, lead game designer
2018	Mario Tennis Aces	Producer, lead game designer
2021	Mario Golf: Super Rush	Producer, lead game designer
2026	Mario Tennis Fever	Producer, lead game designer
