= Shining Force Gaiden: Final Conflict =

1995 video game

- Developer: Sonic! Software Planning
- Publisher: JP: Sega
- Director: Tsukasa Tanaka
- Producer: Shugo Takahashi
- Artist: Hiroshi Kajiyama
- Writers: Shugo Takahashi; Sakura Seiseki; Naoko Okada
- Composer: Motoaki Takenouchi
- Series: Shining
- Platforms: Game Gear, N3DS Virtual Console
- Release: JP: June 30, 1995; JP: January 15, 2014 (3DS Virtual Console)
- Genre: Tactical role-playing game
- Mode: Single-player

Shining Force Gaiden: Final Conflict (シャイニング・フォース外伝 ～ファイナル コンフリクト～) is a 1995 tactical role-playing game for the Game Gear, taking place between the games Shining Force and Shining Force II. It was released after both games, with the intention of connecting their plots. Despite its name, it is not directly story-related to Shining Force Gaiden or Shining Force Gaiden II, also released for Game Gear. Unlike most of its predecessors, the game was never released outside Japan. English patches have been created by fans for players who cannot read Japanese.

== Gameplay ==

Top: Sonette preparing to attack.
Bottom: A battle taking place.

Final Conflict uses gameplay identical to the previous Gaiden games, Shining Force Gaiden and Shining Force Gaiden II. The player progresses through a series of turn-based tactical battles interspersed with short cutscenes. Between the cutscenes, the player is allowed to save the game, promote characters, resurrect fallen characters, and sometimes buy and sell weapons and healing items.

As with most strategy RPGs, each battlefield is divided up into a grid where player characters and enemies take turns moving, attacking, casting magic and using items. Player characters gain experience by battling enemies, and may choose, once they reach level 10, to upgrade their class into a more powerful one.

== Plot ==
=== Story ===
Max, the leader of the Shining Force from the first Shining Force game, is chasing the witch Mishaela (servant of the devil king Darksol, from the same game). One of Max's companions, the robot Adam, is injured in battle with Mishaela. Max's party stops to help the robot, and only Max and his companion Ridion continue the chase. Max and Ridion never come back from the chase. Led by a man named Ian, Max's remaining companions set out to find them.

=== Characters ===
The following is a list of the more significant characters in the game:

- Ian: The leader of the Shining Force.
- Max: The former leader of the Shining Force. A great hero who once fought and defeated the evil wizard Darksol and his awakened master, Dark Dragon. After Dark Dragon's demise, Max formed a new party and continued to fight evil, now following the track of Darksol's former servant, Mishaela. He disappeared when chasing Mishaela, and the first goal of the new Shining Force is to find him.
- Adam: A robot constructed by the Ancients who serves and fights alongside Max. He was badly injured when Max's group fought Mishaela's group on Parmecia, and became unable to fight. However, he is important as an advisor to Ian.
- King Galam: The righteous King Galam rules the kingdom with the same name. He gives Ian the legendary sword once wielded by Max to fight evil, the Chaos Breaker. In honour of Ian's victory, he later renames the weapon "Force Sword".
- Mishaela: Chief servant of Darksol. Was seemingly defeated by the Shining Force in the second Shining series game, but we now learn it was only one of her dolls that was defeated. Her plans are still unknown, but it's certain that she is involved in the disappearance of Max. She is a cunning, malicious, and arrogant woman with formidable magical ability.
- Odd Eye: A blind warrior in the service of the devil king Zeon (from Shining Force II). Zeon is a great enemy of Darksol, so Odd Eye joins the Shining Force for a while to help them to defeat Mishaela. He wields a sword and possesses an attack called Odd Eye Beam, shooting rays by opening his blind eyes.

== Release and reception ==
Reception

Review score
Publication	Score
Famitsu	8/10, 7/10, 7/10, 7/10

Shining Force Gaiden: Final Conflict was released in Japan on for the Game Gear on June 30, 1995. It was not officially released outside Japan.
