= Sakura Note: Ima ni Tsunagaru Mirai =

2009 video game

- Developer: Audio Games
- Publisher: Marvelous Entertainment
- Designer: Akira Ueda
- Writer: Kazushige Nojima
- Composer: Nobuo Uematsu
- Platform: Nintendo DS
- Release: JP: November 5, 2009
- Genre: Adventure
- Mode: Single-player

Sakura Note ~Ima ni Tsunagaru Mirai~ (Note: Japanese: サクラノート ～いまにつながるみらい～; lit. Sakura Note ~The Future Connected to the Present~) is an adventure video game developed by Audio Games and published by Marvelous Entertainment for the Nintendo DS. It was released in Japan on November 5, 2009.

== Plot ==
Sakura Note is set among two towns and their surrounding countryside. The player takes control of the protagonist, who is an average, fifth grade boy. A girl named Nanami Yoshida has just moved into his neighborhood, but she happens to be targeted by a local gang of ghosts. This is somehow connected to a pair of cherry blossom trees set among the two towns, one of which is withered and dying, while the other blooms lively. The protagonist decides to seek out the truth of both mysteries by speaking with the inhabitants of the villages.

== Gameplay ==
The gameplay of Sakura Note requires the player to interact with various non-player characters (NPCs) via the "My Fate System". Using only two choices in a conversation, the correct choice will lead the NPC to shed tears. These tears can then be used to unlock more of the storyline. The player is also able to battle enemies for tears; just like in conversations, one button is denoted as a "courageous" action while the other is an "evasion" action. Using the latter will decrease the number of tears obtained at the end of the battle.

== Development ==
Sakura Note was developed by Audio Games and chiefly designed by Akira Ueda. Concept designer Hideo Minaba handled the game's art direction. Nobuo Uematsu and Kazushige Nojima, famous for their work on the Final Fantasy and Kingdom Hearts series, fulfilled their roles as composer and scenario writer respectively. The game was produced by Kenichiro Takagi, who also worked on the Marvelous title Half-Minute Hero. Audio Games stated that if there is potential business, they would like to have the game localized for overseas markets. However, Ignition Entertainment's Shane Bettenhausen revealed that the company passed on the game due to DS market saturation, and because the game was not Western enough.

A CD soundtrack was included for customers who pre-ordered the game. The soundtrack from Dog Ear Records was also made available on the iTunes store. The theme song, Kimito Hashiru Tobokuha Naku (きみと走るとぼくは泣く; lit. "When I Run With You I Cry") was composed by Uematsu, arranged by Saori Kobayashi, and performed by the group Akane.

== Reception ==
Sakura Note was scored a total of 33 out of 40 by Famitsu magazine. One of its four reviewers felt it was extremely enjoyable: "Everything is excellent, from the dialogue to the music to the light, beautiful graphics. I was pretty much knocked over by the story at the end, but it's a gem of a tale, one that gets under your skin. If I have any complaint, it's that I wish the main scenario was a bit longer." Others on the panel found it to be nothing more than traveling around and watching cutscenes. Despite the positive reviews, Sakura Note sold poorly at only 4,142 units for 2009, according to Media Create.
