= Ai Kawashima =

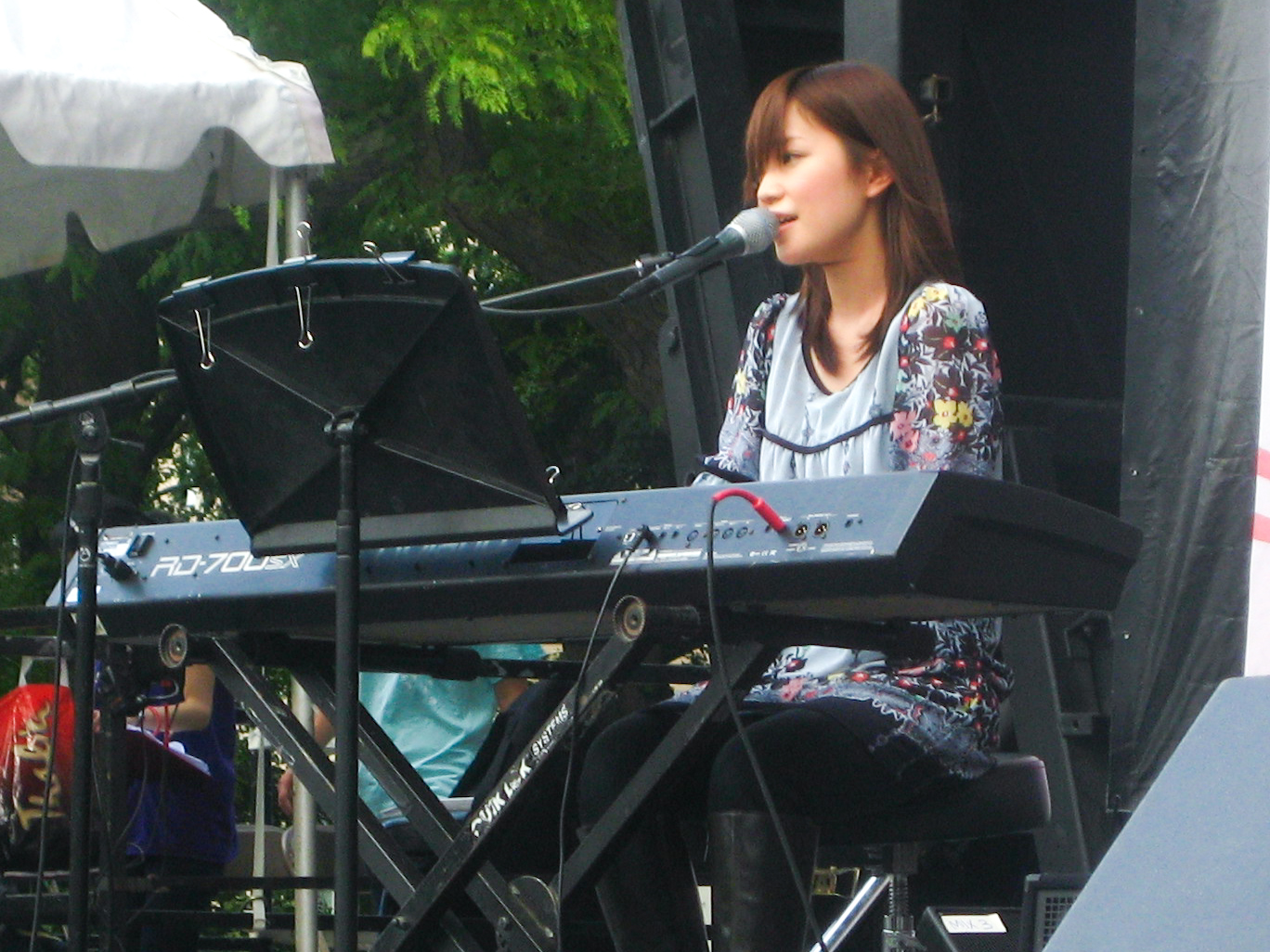
- Ai Kawashima performing at Japan Day 2009 in Central Park, New York City

Background information
- Born: Ai Kawashima (川島 愛); February 21, 1986 (age 40); Fukuoka, Japan
- Genre: J-pop
- Occupations: Singer-songwriter, pianist
- Years active: 1999–present
- Labels: Tsubasa, Sony Music Japan
- Website: www.kawashimaai.com

Ai Kawashima (川嶋 あい, Kawashima Ai; born February 21, 1986) is a Japanese pop singer-songwriter and pianist. After overcoming her tragic childhood, she released her debut single Asueno tobira (Door to Tomorrow) as the duo I Wish in 2003. She is well known for her numerous street performances. She is also known for her devotion to help children under circumstances similar to hers in Japan and rest of the world.

== Early life ==
Kawashima was born and raised in Fukuoka, Japan. After her birth, her mother's health deteriorated and she died when Kawashima was only 3 years old. Because her father had been missing before she was born, she was taken to an orphanage and eventually adopted by the Kawashima family, owners of a construction company. Her foster father died when she was 10. After graduating from middle school, she moved to Tokyo. Her foster mother died when she was 16. She started playing the piano at the age of 3 and eventually began to think about a career as a singer.

== Career ==
Kawashima started her career as an enka singer. At around the age of 10, she performed on stage at the Carnegie Hall in New York. In 1999, she released her debut single, Juu-roku Koi Gokoro / Anata ni Kataomoi (Lit.Sixteen Pure Heart Love / One-Side Love for You). However, the enka project was crippled by poor sales and was abandoned entirely within a few months.

After this initial failure, she began to sing her own songs on the busy street corners in Shibuya, Tokyo with a microphone and a radio cassette player. To become famous, she set herself the goal of performing 1,000 times on the street. Nobody paid attention to her songs at first, but the crowd gradually grew as she kept performing on streets and she met people who gave her support, culminating her major debut and the 2003 hit single "Asueno tobira" (Door to Tomorrow), which sold more than 900,000 copies. She sang the song as the vocalist of the duo I Wish. She has been performing solo since the duo broke up in 2005. Her second solo single, "12-ko no Kisetsu" (12 Seasons) ranked 10th on the Billboard Hits of the world, Japan. Even after her major debut, she kept performing on streets and, in 2005, she accomplished 1,000 street performances, which, according to Kawashima, became the foundation of her music. In 2009, she performed at Japan Day at Central Park, New York.

== Personal life ==
Kawashima has devoted her time and money to a project to build schools in developing countries. 3 schools have been finished so far and her goal is to build 100 schools.

Every year since her mother's death, she has held a memorial concert on August 20.

On the night of March 11, 2011, 20 elementary school students who were able to flee the devastating tsunami after Tohoku earthquake comforted each other by singing the song "Tabidachi no Hi ni" (On the day of departure) together at a local Shinto shrine where they spent the night. The students had been practicing the song for their graduation ceremony, which was only a week away. Having heard the story, Kawashima visited the students in a shelter on April 6 and sang the same song together. On August 21, she visited the students one more time to attend their belated graduation ceremony and sang the song together. The song ends with the words, "Let us bloom from this bud."

== Discography ==
Kawashima's songs have been featured in various anime and video games. "Zetsubou to Kibou" (絶望と希望) is the theme song of Shining Force Neo; "Compass" is the theme song of the eighth One Piece movie Episode of Alabasta: The Desert Princess and the Pirates, and "Kimi no Koe" is the ending theme song of The Place Promised in Our Early Days. One of her newest songs, "Door Crawl", is the theme song of Final Fantasy Fables: Chocobo's Dungeon.

=== Singles ===
1. [2003.08.21] Tenshitachi no Melody / Tabidachi no Asa (「天使たちのメロディー/旅立ちの朝」)
2. [2004.02.18] 12-ko no Kisetsu ~4 Dome no Haru~ (「12個の季節～4度目の春～」)
3. [2004.05.25/06.02] Page 525 (525ページ)
4. [2004.08.04] Mermaid (「マーメイド」)
5. [2004.11.17] 'Sayonara' 'Arigatō' ~Tatta Hitotsu no Basho~ (「さよなら」「ありがとう」～たった一つの場所～)
6. [2005.04.06] Zetsubō to Kibō (「絶望と希望」)
7. [2005.08.24] ...Arigatō... (「・・・ありがとう．．．」)
8. [2006.02.01] Dear / Tabidachi no Hi ni... (Dear/旅立ちの日に...)
9. [2006.04.19] Mienai Tsubasa (「見えない翼」)
10. [2006.10.11] Taisetsu na Yakusoku / Mou Hitotsu no Yakusoku (「大切な約束/もう1つの約束」)
11. [2007.02.14] My Love
12. [2007.03.14] Compass
13. [2007.05.30] Kimi ni..... (「君に･････」)
14. [2007.10.03] Shiawase Desu ka / Suitcase (「幸せですか/スーツケース」)
15. [2007.12.12] Door Crawl (「ドアクロール」)
16. [2008.08.20] Kakera (「カケラ」)
17. [2009.04.08] Daijōbu da yo (「大丈夫だよ」)
18. [2009.12.16] Daisuki da yo (「大好きだよ」)
19. [2010.04.07] haru no yume (「春の夢」)
20. [2010.12.16] I Remember feat. Joe Sample
21. [2013.04.10] Yes/No / T
22. [2014.02.19] Sora wa koko ni aru (「空はここにある」)
23. [2015.07.01] Tobira (「とびら」)

=== Mini albums ===
1. [2002.07.13] Kono Basho Kara... (「この場所から・・・」)
2. [2002.10.18] Habatakeru Hi Made... (「はばたける日まで・・・」)
3. [2002.12.26] Ayumi Tsuzukeru Tame ni... (「歩みつづけるために・・・」)
4. [2003.03.08] Yuki ni Saku Hana no yō ni... (「雪に咲く花のように・・・」)
5. [2003.05.23] Ashita o Shinjite... (「明日を信じて・・・」)
6. [2003.08.02] Utai Tsuzukeru Kara... (「歌いつづけるから・・・」)

=== Albums ===
1. [2005.05.18] 12-ko no Uta (Message) (12個の歌(メッセージ))
2. [2005.09.28] Rojōshū 1-gō (「路上集I号」)
3. [2006.05.24] Thank You! (サンキュー!)
4. [2006.08.23] Piano Songs: Rojōshū 2-gō (Piano Songs～路上集2号～)
5. [2007.06.27] Ashiato (足あと)
6. [2008.04.23] Café & Musique: Rojōshū 3-gō (Café & Musique ～路上集3号～)
7. [2008.06.04] Single Best
8. [2008.06.04] Coupling Best
9. [2009.06.03] Simple Treasure
10. [2010.05.26] 24/24
11. [2011.06.29] My favorite songs – Wing
12. [2012.02.22] My favorite songs – Tabidachi
13. [2013.06.26] One song
14. [2014.06.25] Shutter
15. [2015.10.21] Be Your Side

=== DVDs ===
1. [2004.12.01] 道の途中で...。 (Michi no Tochuu de...)
2. [2005.06.08] ライブ1000回達成記念～1136日の記録～ (Live 1000-kai Tassei Kinen 1136 Nichi no Kiroku)
3. [2005.12.21] PV Collection +α
4. [2006.11.01] ドラマ (大切な約束) (Drama (Taisetsu na Yakusoku))
5. [2006.11.29] つばさ祭'06～秘密の陣～ (Tsubasa-Sai '06: Himitsu no Jin)
6. [2006.12.20] 川嶋あいConcert Tour2006 ～サンキュー！～ (Kawashima Ai Concert Tour 2006: Thank You!)
7. [2007.04.11] 2003.8.20 渋谷公会堂 ～旅立ちの朝～ (2003.8.20 Shibuya Kōkaidō: Tabidachi no Asa)
8. [2007.06.27] つばさ祭'07～春の陣～ (Tsubasa-Sai '07 ~Haru no Jin~)
9. [2007.12.26] Ai Kawashima Concert 2007 足あと (Ai Kawashima Concert 2007 Ashi Ato)
10. [2009.04.08] The Best: Seventeenfivetwentyto- Ai Kawashima Concert Tour 2008
11. [2010.01.13] What's your Simple Treasure? Special Ai Kawashima Concert Tour 2009 渋谷C.C.Lemonホール (What's your Simple Treasure? Special Ai Kawashima Concert Tour 2009 Shibuya C.C.Lemon Hall)
12. [2012.01.08] WING 〜Ai Kawashima Live Concert 2011〜
13. [2012.12.26] My Room – 8 Gatsu 20 Ka 10 Kai Kinen

=== Books ===
- 16-sai no Shiroi Chizu 16歳の白い地図. Gakken. July 25, 2003. ISBN 9784777103690.
- Aoi Tabi no Tsuzuki 蒼い旅の続き. Gentosha. September 2, 2004. ISBN 978-4-344-00669-0.
- Saigo no Kotoba 最後の言葉. Goma Books. September 1, 2005. ISBN 978-4-7771-0209-9.
