= Mega (video game magazine) =

British video game magazine (1992–1995)

- Cover of issue 2, November 1992
- Editor: Neil West; Andy Dyer; Gerry Doak; Lee Brown
- Categories: Video game journalism
- Frequency: Monthly
- First issue: October 1992
- Final issue: 1995
- Company: Future Publishing 1992–1994; Maverick Magazines 1994–1995
- Country: United Kingdom
- Based in: Bath
- Language: English
- ISSN: 0966-6206

Mega was a British monthly magazine that covered the Mega Drive video game console. During its time as one of the main Mega Drive publications, Mega covered the "golden age" of the Sega Mega Drive from 1992 to 1995. The magazine went through many changes including a re-design in content and layout before being sold to a rival publisher.

== History ==
During the summer of 1992, the then Deputy Editor of Sega Power Neil West was given the position of launch Editor of the new Mega Drive magazine. Amanda Cook was drafted in from Amiga Power to serve as Art Editor. Andy Dyer, who had worked on Nintendo magazine Total!, was appointed as Deputy Editor. Paul Mellerick, ex-Sega Force writer, completed the four person editorial team as Staff Writer.

On 17 September the first issue was released Mega, cover dated October 1992, appeared on newsagent stands priced £1.95. Printed on glossy super A4 and put together with a quality front cover and spine, Mega adopted relatively high production values. The launch issue included much of what was to become the magazine's regular content: 'Mega City', previews, reviews, 'Mega Play', 'Arena', 'Mega Mouth' and the always controversial 'Top 100' games guide.

By the end of 1993, West had gone to the USA to launch Next Generation Magazine, holding the title Chief-in-editor. Andy Dyer took over the editor's position and the magazine continued with success, showing a circulation of over 50,000 for the January – June period. However, for reasons unknown to its readers, Future Publishing decided to sell the magazine. The last Mega issue published under Future Publishing was issue 23, cover date August 1994. The event was listed, at a later date, on Future's website history pages.

In August 1994 Mega was now a Maverick Magazine and their first edition was the September 1994 issue, number 24. Already the publisher of rival Mega Drive title Mega Drive Advanced Gaming, Maverick stated that they wanted to cover the "Mega Drive specific market", having already bought another Mega Drive magazine MegaTech from EMAP. The 'Maverick' Mega had the same style and layout as the Future Mega but as the staff had changed, so had the magazine style. The page count was dwindling down every month and it was not too long before the magazine closed.

The magazine had a typical ABC of 45,000.

== Editorial Style & Content ==
=== Mega City ===
Mega City was the games news section where all the Mega Drive news was announced. Also included in this section were features like the Editorial column, 'Q's in the News', 'Bull Durham's World of PR' and 'Busman's Holiday'. Q's in the News was a list of questions that was printed in the News section. The Mega Drive related questions ranged from easy to hard. There were also five screen grabs from games, which were altered and skewered, from which you had to answer, or guess, what game the shot was from. Mainly because of Bull Durham's first name, Mega used this character to bust PR bluffs and blunders in the Mega Drive marketing world, with hilarious consequences. Busman's Holiday featured a Q&A style interview with people working in the video game industry like musician Rob Hubbard, EA Marketing Manager Simon Jeffrey, Games' Tester Danny Curley, GamesMaster host Dominik Diamond and a familiar games journalist called Andy Dyer.

=== Interviews ===
Mega would feature interviews with people who were involved in the video games scene. Celebrity interviews included Dominik Diamond, Robert Llewellyn (Kryten from Red Dwarf), Pat Sharp, Andy Crane and 'The man with the cyber-razor cut' Jimmy of Sega adverts. Discussions would usually involve what they were doing at the moment and occasionally even Sega related stuff. The Pat Sharp interview focused on the heading 'Is Sonic Killing Rock 'n' Roll?'.

=== Previews and Reviews ===
Previews and reviews were informative and the layout was clear. Cover featured games like NHLPA Hockey '93 and Sonic 2 were given massive six-page coverage. Each review had an info panel to the right of the page which included all the game details and ratings. Ratings were given, out of ten, to graphics, sound, gameplay, game size and addiction. The overall score was given as a percentage. Sometimes a second, and third, member of staff would add their 'Not so fast...' box to the review, stating their opinion on the game. Also included in the reviews was a 'Then again..' box, which gave the reader a reminder of previously released games in the same genre.

=== Mega Play ===
Mega's tip section was very comprehensive; in total the Tips pages included 'Mega Play' (tips, cheats, codes and more), 'Mega Medic', where readers wrote in about their gaming problems and Mega replied with tips or solutions, and the 'Rip 'n' Tip' section featured in-depth complete guides to popular games.

=== Top 100 ===
The Top 100 was a buyer's guide to the best Mega Drive games. The Top 100 always caused controversy and confusion among many readers. The idea was to list the best games usually by genre, e.g. Joe Montana Football would be listed lower than usual purely because there was another, better, game in that genre; John Madden Football. Through later issues classic mini reviews and reader's ads were added to the Top 100 section. In issue 23 the Top 100 was given an overhaul and was now just the Top 50 games, of which Sensible Soccer was now at the top spot.

Mega top 40 carts

First	Number	Final
John Madden Football 92	1	Sensible Soccer
EA Hockey	2	Super Street Fighter II
Sonic the Hedgehog	3	John Madden Football
Hellfire	4	Virtua Racing
Super Monaco GP 2	5	Sonic 3
Streets of Rage	6	Landstalker
Quackshot	7	NBA Jam
Road Rash	8	Flashback
Rainbow Islands	9	Mean Bean Machine
PGA Tour Golf	10	Micro Machines
Sword of Vermillion	11	FIFA Soccer
Phantasy Star 3	12	Aladdin
Aero Blasters	13	Jungle Strike
Golden Axe 2	14	ToeJam & Earl 2
Desert Strike	15	Chaos Engine
Speedball 2	16	Sub Terrania
Thunder Force 3	17	F1
Revenge of Shinobi	18	PGA Tour
Taz-Mania	19	Road Rash 2
James Pond 2	20	NHL Hockey
Castle of Illusion	21	Jungle Book
Decap Attack	22	Lost Vikings
Ghouls'n Ghosts	23	Lemmings
Lakers versus Celtics	24	Ecco the Dolphin
Populous	25	Streets of Rage 3
ToeJam & Earl	26	Quackshot
Pit Fighter	27	Davis Cup Tennis
Shining in the Darkness	28	Cool Spot
Phantasy Star 2	29	Hellfire
F-22 Interceptor	30	Mortal Kombat
Strider	31	Rolo to the Rescue
ESWAT	32	Tiny Toons
Shadow Dancer	33	Shining Force
Columns	34	Mega-Lo-Mania
Kid Chameleon	35	Lethal Enforcers
Terminator	36	Sonic 2
Two Crude Dudes	37	Rainbow Islands
After Burner II	38	Desert Strike
Buck Rogers: Countdown to Doomsday	39	Incredible Hulk
New Zealand Story	40	WWF Royal Rumble

Issue 1 also included a list of the 10 Worst Mega Drive Games of All Time, which was topped by Altered Beast.

A Mega CD Top 10 was introduced after the console's launch, with the initial top spot going to Final Fight, which was eventually replaced with Thunderhawk by the end of the magazine's run.

=== Mega Mouth ===
'Mega Mouth' was the letters pages which featured letters from readers. The best letter of the month would be given a prize along with the title 'Mega Star' above their letter, whereas the letter that was deemed unintelligible would be titled with 'Mega Moron'. Also included in these pages were other columns such as 'Excerpts From The Diary of a Stunt Mega Drive', 'Blagged' and 'The Curious Letters of Harold S Bloxham', which followed the unsuccessful exploits of imaginary Harold S Bloxham and his crusade against video game nasties and the evil they inflict on our younger generation. His letters were sent out to various celebrities and politicians in the hope that they would agree with his views and join his cause. Letters and replies came back from the likes of Claire Rayner, Blue Peter editor Lewis Bronze, Jason Donovan, Sir Patrick Moore, Magnus Magnusson, Kenny Dalglish and Loyd Grossman. All correspondence replied back, politely, disagreeing with his views and stating their reasons. Once it was realised to Harold that his efforts were going unheeded he gave up. It was then revealed that Harold S. Bloxham didn't exist after all, it was Neil West and Andy Dyer playing devil's advocate on the game playing scene.

=== Shutdown ===
Was the back page where the magazine previewed what was to come in the next issue. Also featured the A's in the Back Page, which was the answers to the Q's in the News.

== Staff ==
Neil West – Editor (1992–1993)
West worked on Sega Power in 1990, becoming deputy editor. He also contributed to several other Future titles like Commodore Format, Amiga Format and Amiga Power It was during this time that he also appeared many times on games TV shows such as GamesMaster, co-commentating with host Dominik Diamond on the latest games challenge. Also co-hosted, with Jane Goldman, the Games World reviews show House of Games broadcast on satellite TV.
Andy Dyer – Deputy Editor (1992–1993); Editor (1993–1994)
Dyer's first break into games journalism came about when he applied for a Staff Writer position for Commodore Format. His flatmate had noticed the advert for the launch of a new C64 magazine. He continued to work on CF until late 1991.
Along with fellow Commodore Format editor Steve Jarratt, he helped launch the independent Nintendo magazine Total!; a video games magazine initially focusing on the current Nintendo consoles NES and Game Boy, and later SNES and Nintendo 64. In 1992 Andy, along with Steve Jarratt, produced a paperback book on Nintendo games titled Total 42 – Life, the Universe and Nintendo Games.
He left Total! in the summer of 1992 to become Deputy Editor of Mega. Became editor in late 1993 when Neil West went over to work in the United States.
Paul Mellerick – Staff Writer
Mellerick started writing for Commodore 64 magazine Zzap!64, but would later move over to newly launched sister title Sega Force.
Joined Mega as staff writer for the launch issue in 1992 and continued to write for the magazine until its sale to Maverick Magazines in September 1994. He then moved over to work on Amiga Power as staff writer for the October 1994 issue. Mellerick later died of an undiagnosed heart condition at the age of 27.
Amanda Cook (later Amanda Dyson) – Art Editor
Although her official position was Art Editor, Cook was also credited for the odd review. Started on Amiga Power as Art Editor in November 1991. Left after July 1992 to help with the launch of Mega. Then left Mega to work on the TV show games magazine GamesMaster.
Jon Smith – Staff Writer
Moved on from Mega to work on Total Film. Later held the position of Head of External Development at Codemasters. He then moved to games developer TT Games as Development Director, where he was responsible for the production of LEGO Star Wars: The Video Game.
Josse Bilson – Staff Writer
A Staff Writer on the newly acquired Sega Zone in 1993. When Future Publishing sold the magazine to Maverick Magazines in early 1994, Bilson moved over to Mega as Staff Writer. Has also appeared on GamesMaster as a co-commentator during the fourth season. Appeared on GamesMaster in 1994 as co-commentator next to host Dominik Diamond. Later worked on PlayStation Power magazine.
Will Groves – Staff Writer
Groves joined Mega just before it was sold, so never got a real chance to contribute much to the magazine. He became editor of Future Publishing's game website 'gamesradar.com'. Later was promoted to Associate Producer of the CVG online network.
Contributors
Mega's credits mast contributed many writers each month. These writers would often contribute uncredited articles and reviews. Through the years these writers included Stuart Campbell, Andy Hutchinson, James Leach, Adam Waring, Richard Longhurst, Trenton Webb, Jonathan Davies and Gary Penn.

== See also ==
- Video game journalism
- Video game industry
- Video game
