= Shining Force III =

1997 video game

- European box art
- Developers: Sonic! Software Planning; Camelot Software Planning
- Publisher: Sega
- Director: Yasuhiro Taguchi
- Producer: Hiroyuki Takahashi
- Designers: Hiroyuki Takahashi; Shugo Takahashi
- Writer: Hiroyuki Takahashi
- Composer: Motoi Sakuraba
- Series: Shining
- Platform: Sega Saturn
- Release: Scenario 1: JP: December 11, 1997; EU: June 12, 1998; NA: July 31, 1998; Scenario 2: JP: April 29, 1998; Scenario 3: JP: September 23, 1998
- Genre: Tactical role-playing
- Mode: Single-player

Shining Force III (Note: Shining Force III (シャイニング・フォースIII, Shainingu Fōsu III)) is a tactical role-playing game released for the Sega Saturn. In Japan, Shining Force III was a video game released in three parts across three discs - Scenario 1, (Note: Shining Force III Scenario 1 - Oto no Kyoshin (Note: Japanese: シャイニング・フォースIII シナリオ1 王都の巨神; lit. Shining Force III Scenario 1 - Giant God of Royal Capital)) Scenario 2, (Note: Shining Force III Scenario 2 - Nerawareta Miko (Note: Japanese: シャイニング・フォースIII シナリオ2 狙われた神子; lit. Shining Force III Scenario 2 - Targeted Priestess)) and Scenario 3 (Note: Shining Force III Scenario 3 - Hyoheki no Jashingu (Note: Japanese: シャイニング・フォースIII シナリオ3 氷壁の邪神宮; lit. Shining Force III Scenario 3 - Evil Shrine on the Ice Wall)) - released individually across late 1997 and 1998. Game data could be saved and transferred forward to later scenarios in order to influence events and obtain rewards in-game, a mechanic marketed as the "Synchronicity system". Each scenario utilizes the same core gameplay mechanics, but follows a different character's perspective of the overarching narrative in a shared game world. In North America and Europe, only the first entry, Scenario 1, was translated into English, and was simply titled Shining Force III for its release in mid-1998.

The title was the last in the long-running Shining series to be developed by original developers Camelot Software Planning, the last to be developed for Sega hardware as the series would go on a hiatus until after Sega's exit from the hardware industry, and the last game from Camelot Software to not be developed exclusively for Nintendo hardware. The game was generally well-received, albeit with relatively limited sales due to its release late in the Saturn's lifespan. It has not been re-released, though unofficial English fan translations for Scenario 2 and Scenario 3 were later produced.

== Gameplay ==

Top: An enemy preparing to attack.
Bottom: A battle taking place.

Like earlier Force games in the Shining series, Shining Force III is a turn-based tactical role-playing game. Battles take place in square grids, and each unit occupies one square. Each unit can move up to a fixed amount of squares along the battlefield, determined by its Move statistic. Depending on its location relative to enemies and to allies, a unit can also perform one action: attack, cast a spell, use an item, or search the area. Some commands, such as equipping or dropping items, do not count as actions. The order of turns is determined by the unit's agility score and a random seed.

As is typical for an RPG, units become stronger by fighting enemies or by performing other actions in battle, such as healing allies. These actions give the units experience points, which allow them to gain levels.

Each character has a class, which defines a set of abilities for that unit and determines the spells and equipment they have access to. A character can be promoted to another class at any level between 10 or 20. Upon promotion the character's level resets to 1.

Battle goals for the player are fairly simple: kill all enemies, kill the enemies' leader, or advance to a town or landmark. The enemy side wins if they kill the player's leader (Synbios in Scenario 1, Prince Medion in Scenario 2 and Julian in Scenario 3), or if the player chooses to escape the battle by casting Return. Even if the player army is defeated, the player can recover allies and retry the battle. The Force keeps any experience that is obtained, regardless of the battle's outcome. Thus, there is no game over, and the player's army gets stronger even upon its defeat, although the leader's death results in the player losing half of their money.

Characters which fight together develop stronger friendships, which causes their battle stats to increase when the two characters are close to each other.

Shining Force III also possesses an exploration mode that occurs outside of battle. This gameplay mode is essentially a Japanese-style traditional RPG, along the lines of Final Fantasy or Dragon Quest, although there are no labyrinths and few puzzles to solve. In this mode, the player's army is represented by its leader, who is able to walk around, interact with people, find treasure, buy equipment and items, outfit the army and choose which of the army's members will be used in battle.

== Plot ==
Scenario 1 follows Synbios, a young lord from the Republic of Aspinia. Aspinia was once a part of the Empire of Destonia, but seceded after a war of independence spearheaded by some of the more democratic-minded nobles. They opposed Emperor Domaric's totalitarian policies, which disenfranchised a large number of people, creating a huge disparity between the wealthy and the poor. Tensions remained between Aspinia and Destonia after the secession, marked by occasional border disputes. As the game begins, Synbios is part of a military force representing Aspinia at a peace conference in the neutral city of Saraband. Due to manipulation by outside forces - later discovered to be connected with a religious cult known as the "Bulzome Sect" - full-scale war breaks out again between Aspinia and Destonia. The majority of the game's storyline covers this conflict as well as Synbios and his team's fight against the Bulzome sect. Throughout the game, Synbios has periodic encounters with Medion, Destonia's youngest prince, who also recognizes the truth behind the war. Although on opposite sides of the war, the two work together to identify the real threat.

Scenario 2 follows Medion, Prince of Destonia, and youngest of three sons of Emperor Domaric. Although loyal to his father and his country, he senses that there are other forces at work beneath the tensions between Aspinia and Destonia. He attends the conference in Saraband on behalf of Destonia, along with his brothers Arrawnt and Mageron. As discovered in Scenario 1, much of this influence comes from the Bulzome sect, as well as collaborating separatist factions within both Destonia and Aspinia. Medion works parallel to Synbios of Aspinia, often disposing of rogue Aspinian elements to spare Synbios's force from fighting against its own countrymen. At the end of the game, Medion is forced to battle with Synbios' force when Julian steps in to stop them.

Scenario 3 follows Julian, a mercenary who appears as a secondary character in both Scenario 1 and Scenario 2. He is for all intents and purposes the true main character of Shining Force III. His initial motivation as the story begins is to track down and kill Galm, one of, if not the, most powerful member of the Vandals, a powerful race of beings that existed over 1,000 years ago. Julian believes that Galm killed his father and is seeking revenge. Julian joins Synbios in the midst of his quest in Scenario 1, but after an encounter with Galm, he is tossed over a waterfall at the suspension bridge and believed by Synbios' army to be dead. He reappears in Scenario 2, apparently washing ashore at the site of a battle between Medion's army and the Bulzome Sect. Knowing the sect's ties to the Vandals, Julian agrees to fight alongside Medion. As it becomes clear that the sect is trying to kill Gracia, a child intended to become the next god-like existence called an Innovator, Julian takes on the task of protecting him and helping him realize his destiny. Eventually Julian leads a three-party coalition consisting of the armies of both Synbios and Medion, to engage in the final conflict against Bulzome, a powerful Vandal long sealed in another dimension, and the true orchestrator of the conflict.

== Development and release ==
Work on Shining Force III began while its predecessor Shining the Holy Ark (1996) was still in development and took nearly two years. The game was announced exclusively for the Sega Saturn in August 1997. Over thirty people in-house were working on the project. A few things were outsourced.

The game was released in three separate parts, each referred to as a "scenario". Each scenario showed events from different viewpoints, but were wholly separate games. IGN reported on rumors that stated that all three scenarios were once planned for English release. However, as development went on, and the Saturn's hardware sales continued to drop, only Scenario 1 would be localized, simply titled Shining Force III, with minor edits to the game script that resolved the original game's cliffhanger ending.

Camelot issued a supplemental piece of software, Shining Force III Premium Disk, to Japanese players who submitted proof of purchase for the full trilogy. The Premium Disk included concept art, a character model viewer, and bonus battles to play with data imported from prior Shining Force III scenario discs.

Following Sega's exit from the video game hardware and transition into a third party software developer in 2001, Sega of America's VP of Corporate and Marketing Communications, Charles Bellfield, mentioned Sega had plans to port Sega Saturn games to the original PlayStation. While Bellfield mentioned Shining Force III was "a perfect example of the type of title that we believe could sell very well on the PSX/PS one platform", no such release ever materialized.

== Reception ==
Reception

Aggregate score
Aggregator	Score
GameRankings	85% (6 reviews)

Review scores
Publication	Score
Electronic Gaming Monthly	9/10, 8.5/10, 9/10, 9/10
Game Informer	8.5/10
GameSpot	8.5/10
Next Generation	4/5
RPGFan	83% 92%
Sega Saturn Magazine	93%

Reviews for Shining Force III were positive. Critics particularly commented on the fully polygonal graphics, saying they are visually impressive and add depth to the game. GameSpot and Sega Saturn Magazine remarked that while the environments are less detailed than those of Grandia, they run more smoothly. Multiple critics also praised the soundtrack, the use of the rotating game camera, and the English translation.

Most critics also expressed appreciation that Shining Force III retained the same essential gameplay as previous Shining Force installments, which they considered more refreshingly simple than that of most tactical RPGs of the time, enabling a faster paced and more fun style of play. U.S. magazine Next Generation was an exception; when reviewing the Japanese version as an import, they asserted that the retention of the gameplay format and interface of previous series entries was a failure to move forward, though they immediately afterward clarified that the game is "a worthy upgrade to a game series that's already proven itself." In their review of the U.S. release, Next Generation stated that "Like Saturn itself, Shining Force III will end up being an effort that was underproduced, underrated, but fun as hell."

GamePro saw the simple, streamlined gameplay as the highlight of Shining Force III, concluding, "Shining Force III is a vast improvement over the highly complicated, statistic-intense games that fill its tactical sub-genre. This is an accessible, fun RPG that will keep you on your toes at all turns with concentrated challenge." (Note: GamePro gave the game a 4.0 out of 5 in graphics, 4.0 in sound, 4.5 in control, and 4.5 in fun factor.) All four members of Electronic Gaming Monthly's review team instead cited the story as the game's best element, while Rich Leadbetter of Sega Saturn Magazine was most impressed with the amount of freedom offered in battle tactics and story decisions, commenting that while the story is still linear, the player has an unprecedented amount of control in how it plays out. GameSpot's Peter Bartholow gave credit to the game's long playtime and numerous secret characters and weapons, and felt it could have been a system seller had it come out before the Saturn was effectively dead. Many reviews for the game lamented the unlikelihood of Scenarios 2 and 3 receiving English releases.

Ashley Day of Retro Gamer magazine named it his favorite game of all time.
