= Shining Soul =

2002 video game

- North American box art
- Developers: Nextech; Grasshopper Manufacture
- Publishers: JP: Sega; EU: Sega Europe; NA: Atlus USA
- Director: Akira Ueda
- Producer: Junichiro Takahashi
- Designers: Akira Ueda; Masashi Niwano
- Programmers: Tetsuya Nakazawa; Tooru Yoshio
- Artists: Akira Ueda; Rika Kurokawa
- Writer: Akira Ueda
- Composer: Shingo Yasumoto
- Series: Shining
- Platform: Game Boy Advance
- Release: JP: March 28, 2002; EU: March 7, 2003; NA: September 16, 2003
- Genre: Action role-playing
- Modes: Single-player, multiplayer

Shining Soul (Note: Japanese: シャイニング・ソウル, Hepburn: Shainingu Sōru) is an action role-playing game for the Game Boy Advance. It is part of the Shining series. Shining Soul is a reboot of the Shining series. The game was followed by a sequel, Shining Soul II, in 2003. Both games were re-released in Japan in early 2006 as part of the Game Boy Advance "Value Selection".

== Plot ==
The game takes place in the land of Rune, where a creature named Dark Dragon has gathered an army of Darkness in an attempt to bring about the destruction of the world. Your character is a hero of the Shining Fleet, which has trapped Dark Dragon and its five generals in the region of Runefaust and is now preparing to make a final assault on the enemy forces.

== Gameplay ==
The game contains four main classes (Warrior, Archer, Dragonute, or Wizard) and several dungeons that involve hack and slash style fighting. The player can cycle between magic and weapons based attacks. As you progress through the game and gain levels, you're able to allocate points for your main stats, like strength and dexterity, as well as distribute skill points. Skill points allow you to raise weapon and magic proficiency levels and to raise the levels of other abilities that are class-specific, such as defense for the warrior, critical hits for the archer, and so on.

== Release ==
The game saw a European release in March 2003, with Infogrames handling distribution and Sega Europe handling publication. In December 2002, THQ, who held a deal with Sega at the time to publish their games on the Game Boy Advance in the market, announced they had no intentions on releasing the title in the region.

== Reception ==
Reception

Aggregate scores
Aggregator	Score
GameRankings	56.86%
Metacritic	58/100

Review scores
Publication	Score
Electronic Gaming Monthly	7/10, 7.5/10, 6.5/10
Eurogamer	4/10
Famitsu	8/10, 8/10, 6/10, 8/10
Game Informer	6.5/10
GameSpot	5.6/10
GameSpy	2/5
IGN	5.5/10
Nintendo Power	4.1/5
RPGamer	7/10
RPGFan	60%

The game received "mixed or average" reviews according to the review aggregation website Metacritic.

Craig Harris of IGN lamented, "As it stands, Shining Soul just feels like a shell of a design, good ideas and intentions spattered throughout boring action sequences." Tom Bramwell of Eurogamer said: "It says "RPG" in the genre box, but it's really not. Role-playing games are renowned for their engaging (or at least expansive) plot lines, diverse characters and locations, progressive combat and intricacy. Shining Soul is notable because it singularly fails to live up to anything that's come before it." Star Dingo of GamePro said of the game, "Many gamers saw screens of Shining Soul in Japanese form long, long ago and wondered why such a cool-looking game wasn't coming to America right away. That question has finally been answered." (Note: GamePro gave the game 4/5 for graphics, 3.5/5 for sound, and two 3/5 scores for control and fun factor.)
