= Shining Resonance Refrain =

2014 Japanese role-playing game developed by Media.Vision and published by Sega

Shining Resonance
- Refrain cover art featuring Excella
- Developers: Media.Vision; O-Two (Refrain)
- Publisher: Sega
- Directors: Makoto Suzuki; Masaya Kobayashi; Takeshi Ozawa
- Producers: Makoto Suzuki; Tsuyoshi Sawada
- Artist: Tony Taka
- Composers: Junpei Fujita; Hitoshi Fujima; Evan Call
- Series: Shining
- Platforms: PlayStation 3; PlayStation 4; Nintendo Switch; Windows; Xbox One
- Release: PlayStation 3: JP: December 11, 2014; PlayStation 4: JP: March 29, 2018; WW: July 10, 2018; Switch, Windows: WW: July 10, 2018; JP: July 12, 2018; Xbox One: NA/EU: July 10, 2018
- Genre: Role-playing
- Mode: Single-player

Shining Resonance Refrain (Note: シャイニング・レゾナンス リフレイン (Shainingu Rezonansu Rifurein)) is an action role-playing video game developed by O-Two Inc. and published by Sega. Originally developed by Media.Vision, it is an entry in Sega's Shining series of video games, and an expanded and remastered version of the Japan-only Shining Resonance (Note: シャイニング・レゾナンス リフレイン (Shainingu Rezonansu)) released for the PlayStation 3 in 2014. While the original release was not translated into English, Refrain was released worldwide in July 2018 for Nintendo Switch, PlayStation 4, Windows, and Xbox One platforms.

Various staff members returned from previous Shining titles, including character designer Tony Taka and music composers from the group Elements Garden. Upon its worldwide launch, Shining Resonance Refrain received mixed reviews from critics, who generally found the game likeable and praised its combat system, but criticized some aspects of its presentation and lack of originality.

== Gameplay ==
The game plays as a traditional Japanese role-playing game with action-based battles, similar to the Tales series of video games. Interactions by the player made between the main character and other playable characters affect player's "relationship level"; talking while resting or camping initiates special story scenes, which in turn can lead to dating scenes the following day.

== Plot ==
The game follows Yuma Ilvern, who holds the Spirit of the Shining Dragon, an ancient Dragon who died in an ancient war. At the start of the game, Yuma is held captive in Gaelritz Prison with an attempted rescue mission by Sonia Blanche and Kirika Towe Alma on the way. After a confrontation with Excella Noa Aura and her three spears, Yuma summons the Blade of the Shining Dragon, the Vanderhorn. They then manage to escape on the back of the Shining Dragon after Yuma transformed into him and return to Marga, the capital of Astoria. When he wakes up back as Yuma, he joins Astoria in their war against the Empire alongside the Dragoneers and the Princess of Astoria in an attempt to achieve peace for their people.

== Development and release ==
The game was announced in May 2014 as Shining Resonance, as the newest title in Sega's Shining series. The game was developed by Media.Vision, and featured illustrations by longtime series character artist Tony Taka. The game received a Japan-only release later in the year on the PlayStation 3. In November 2017, a remaster, Shining Resonance Refrain, was announced for PlayStation 4. The remaster was at 90% complete at the time of the announcement, and while an English language release was not announced, Sega did note that they were considering a worldwide audience for the series, a departure from most of the recent entries in the series, which had stayed in Japan. In February 2018, Sega announced that the game would receive an English-language localization, and that it would also be released for the Nintendo Switch, Windows, and Xbox One platforms. The game was released in July 2018.

The remastered version contains multiple new additions to the core of the original Shining Resonance. The game contains a "Refrain Mode" which tells a new "what-if" side story separate from the main story. It does not need to be unlocked - it is available prior to even starting the main game, though the developers state that while the side story does not affect the main story, it makes more sense if the main game is played first. Two additional party members, Excella and Jinas, are added as well; they were present in the prior game, but not playable. Over 150 pieces of downloadable content (DLC) from the PS3 game are included in the remaster as well.

== Reception ==
Reception

Aggregate score
| Aggregator | Score |
|---|---|
| Metacritic | NS: 70/100; PC: 68/100; PS4: 67/100; XONE: 74/100 |

Review scores
| Publication | Score |
|---|---|
| Nintendo Life | 7/10 |
| Nintendo World Report | 7/10 |
| Push Square | 7/10 |
| RPGamer | 2.5/5 |

Shining Resonance Refrain received mixed reception, according to review aggregator platform Metacritic. The PlayStation 3 version of the game was the fifth best-selling game in its release week in Japan, selling approximately 67,000 copies.
