= Shining Wisdom =

1995 video game

- North American cover art by Hiroshi Kajiyama
- Developers: Sonic! Software Planning; Camelot Software Planning
- Publishers: JP/EU: Sega; NA: Working Designs
- Director: Yasuhiro Taguchi
- Producer: Hiroyuki Takahashi
- Designers: Ayumu Shindo; Shuji Shimizu; Tatsuya Niikura
- Programmers: Akiko Sato; P. E. Jareth Hein; Takeshi Nohara
- Artists: Ayumu Shindo; Fumihide Aoki; Hiroto Nakashima
- Writer: Hiroyuki Takahashi
- Composer: Motoaki Takenouchi
- Series: Shining
- Platform: Sega Saturn
- Release: JP: 11 August 1995; NA: 27 June 1996; EU: 11 July 1996
- Genre: Action-adventure
- Mode: Single-player

Shining Wisdom (Note: Japanese: シャイニング・ウィズダム, Hepburn: Shainingu Wizudamu) is an action-adventure game developed by Sonic! Software Planning and Camelot Software Planning and published by Sega for the Sega Saturn. It was the last game in the Shining series to be developed for the Sega Genesis/Mega Drive but was reworked for the Saturn late in development. Because of this, it is more typical of the Genesis library than the Saturn library in its basic approach, rendering characters and backgrounds exclusively in 2D (albeit at a higher resolution than would be possible on the Genesis) and utilizing mechanics which mostly follow the rules of a two-dimensional world. This approach was seen as dated by critics, and it was met with mixed reviews, with some seeing it as a decent holdover title due to its massive length.

While the Shining series has flitted across numerous sub-genres, Shining Wisdom remains the only game in the series to abandon the multi-character RPG format entirely. Players instead can control just one character, whose abilities cannot be increased, and gameplay focuses on solving puzzles and navigating the large game world. Though it stands apart from the rest of the series in terms of gameplay, Shining Wisdom is strongly tied into the story continuity of the previous entries and is the last game in the series to follow the saga of the Devil Kings. In North America the game was localized and published by Working Designs.

== Gameplay ==
Gameplay screenshot.

Shining Wisdom differs from its predecessors in the Shining series in that it was the first to employ an action-adventure style of gameplay. Players control one character whose attacks rely on speed and skill, rather than controlling a group of characters who engage in turn-based combat sequences and increase their stats as the game progresses. The gameplay is similar to that of The Legend of Zelda series. Shining Wisdom has a unique system of attacks based on a combination of acquired items and "orbs." The graphics employ CGI-rendered sprites, and a top-down camera angle.

== Plot ==
In the land of Odegan, orphaned squire Mars is employed at Odegan Castle on the strength of his father's great reputation. A series of lies and deceptions on his part unexpectedly places him as the foremost obstacle to the schemes of the dark elf wizard, Pazort. Pazort and his followers intend to destroy the world by summoning the Giant, Seeega (referred to as "the Dark Titan" in the North American translation), and to do so they first must use Princess Satera to get at an orb held by King Odegan. It is up to Mars to redeem his lies and failures by thwarting the mighty wizard's plans.

Shining Wisdom takes place on the continent of Parmecia just a few years after Shining Force II, and some of its plot points follow from that game. Sarah and Kazin, who were playable characters in Shining Force II, are roaming the continent in a hunt for Zeon's remaining henchmen. Pazort, the main villain of Shining Wisdom, is a former follower of Zeon, and Sarah and Kazin aid in the fight against him. There are also several references to the hero of Shining Force II, Bowie, though he does not actually appear anywhere in the game. A book refers to the setting of Shining in the Darkness, Stormsong (referred to in English versions as "Thornwood"). Due to the various name changes and omissions of the North American translation, none of the above connections to the Shining series are apparent in the USA version of the game and they can only be seen in the Japanese and European versions.

== Development ==
Shining Wisdom was originally designed for the Mega Drive, and adapted for the Sega Saturn at the last minute, presumably in order to bolster the new system's library of games. All the characters in the game were modelled using Softimage 3D. It was the last of Sega's Shining series of video games to be scored by Motoaki Takenouchi, the series's longest-running composer.

Working Designs' North American version of the game took numerous creative liberties with the story. Kazin, Sarah, Bowie, and Zeon are respectively referred to as "Parn", "Salah", "Puck", and "Zhaion", while the land of Parmecia is referred to as "Palacia". Sega Japan owned the copyrights to the original names and would not release them. Working Designs also made considerable changes to the characters' personalities and how they relate to each other. For example, the original script made explicit that Sarah does not return the romantic feelings of her companion, Kazin; Working Designs not only deleted these parts of the script, but added in numerous comments from Sarah and other NPCs indicating that she and Kazin are romantically involved.

The European release of Shining Wisdom was translated by Sega Europe. This translation contains some grammatical errors and typos, but none of the contemporary pop-culture jokes and altered characterizations of the Working Designs translation. It also keeps intact the storyline connections between Shining Wisdom and the other games of the Shining series.

== Reception ==
Reception

Review scores
Publication	Score
Electronic Gaming Monthly	5.5/10
GameFan	277/300
Next Generation	3/5
Maximum	4/5
Sega Saturn Magazine	88%

The four reviewers of Electronic Gaming Monthly lambasted Shining Wisdom, citing mediocre and outdated graphics, a lack of originality, and the linearity of the quest. They also criticized the Working Designs translation for its ridiculing of other games on the market, remarking, "Considering the lackluster quality of this generic title, they have a lot of nerve." A reviewer for Next Generation said Shining Wisdom "sadly falls short of 32-bit graphic and gameplaying expectations", looking and playing very similar to last generation games. However, he added it has "a long, involved storyline, a variety of lands to explore, and high play value", and concluded it would make a decent holdover title until more genuinely next generation games in the genre arrived. GamePro thoroughly panned the game, saying it "looks, plays, and feels like a ten-year-old RPG". The reviewer criticized the boring story and dialogue, overly cutesy enemies, and the needlessly difficult to master acceleration skill, and remarked that the game's mediocrity particularly stood out against competition like Mystaria and Working Designs' own Iron Storm.

A reviewer for Maximum concurred with EGM and GamePro that the graphics and audio are outdated to the point where it seemed likely that the game was made for the Genesis/Mega Drive and ported over to the Saturn, but felt the game's "in-depth RPG action" made it a decent holdover title until more promising Saturn action-adventure games like Dark Savior and The Story of Thor 2 were localized to Europe. Rad Automatic of Sega Saturn Magazine praised the "fast-moving and intriguing" storyline, and the ability to control the direction of the plot through yes/no questions. He concluded it to be "ace".
