= I Wish (band) =

Japanese musical group

I WiSH
- Origin: Japan
- Genres: J-pop
- Years active: 2002–2005, 2008
- Label: SME Records
- Past members: Ai Kawashima nao

I WiSH was a Japanese pop group consisting of two members, Ai Kawashima and nao. Ai is responsible for the vocals and occasionally plays the piano also with nao on the keyboard or piano. Their most notable track is "Asu e no Tobira" (明日への扉) and was in the Oricon rankings for over a year.

Nao learned the piano when he was 5 years old. He started making original music, for example "Asu e no Tobira" (明日への扉), "Futatsuboshi" (ふたつ星), "Yakusoku no Hi" (約束の日) and so on. He won the grand prix held by YAMAHA. According to his website, he has a perfect pitch.

Ai Kawashima's father was missing before she was born, and her mother died when she was just three years old. She was adopted by Kawashima's family as an adopted daughter after she spent some time in an orphanage. She learned how to play the piano when she was only 3 years old. In 1999, she debuted as an Enka singer, however, it wasn't a hit. In 2002, they started a life on the road by singing with their own electric piano as a companiment. In 2005, March 24, Ai dissolved I WISH to concentrate on solo activity. But in 2008, the band reformed for a last single together.

== History ==
Nao was walking on Shibuya Road, where he encountered Ai while she was playing background music with a tape recorder and singing while holding a microphone. He talked to her and helped form a group (the office was trying to help). According to the Sony Music advertising materials distributed to each record store, the following content said "Do not let outstanding talents be buried! For Kawashima to form a limited-time single band!" After that, the produced sample cassettes were sent to various record companies, and they made a contract with Sony Music and decided to make their debut.

In October 2002, the band's debut single "Asu e no Tobira" became the theme song of Fuji TV's variety show Love Bus (also used in Japan to broadcast the ending song "Because of You, Yaguchi Mari"). The historical theme songs of this show are popular and actual artists such as Yuzu, Glay, Xiaoshi Band, SPITZ, etc., have become special guests. As an opportunity, their songs topped the karaoke charts, their popularity rose, and "Mukai Mukai Mirai" set a record of 900,000 copies.

In order to focus on individual activities, Kawashima released the album WiSH on March 24, 2005, and the group disbanded. On February 8, 2006, the compilation Best Wishes was released.

On February 21, 2008, at Ai's birthday concert Ai Kawashima Anniversary Live ～Birth Day だからお祝いしNight!～, a one-night limited resurrection concert, was held as a special occasion. In addition to "Renai 3 Busaku", the setlist included song, "Eien to Iu Kono Shunkan Ni".

== Discography ==
=== Studio albums ===
Title	Day	Label	Translation
Tsutaetai Kotoba ~Namida no Ochiru Basho~ 伝えたい言葉 ～涙のおちる場所～	October 1, 2003	SME Records	Words that I Want to Convey ~The Place Where the Tears Fall Down~
WiSH	March 24, 2005	SME Records	

=== Singles ===
Year	Title	Day	Translation
2003	"Asu e no Tobira" 明日への扉	February 14	The Door to Tomorrow
2003	"Futatsubochi" ふたつ星	August 27	Two Stars
2004	"Yakusoku no Hi" 約束の日	May 19	The Day of the Promise
2004	"Kimi to Boku" キミと僕	August 18	You and Me
2005	"Precious Days"	February 9	
2008	"LOVE SONGS 4 YOU"	February 14	

=== Compilations ===
Title	Day	Label
Best Wishes	February 8, 2006	SME Records
The Complete Collection of I WiSH	February 14, 2008	SME Records
