= Record of Lodoss War: Advent of Cardice =

2000 role-playing video game

- Developer: Neverland Co.
- Publishers: JP: Kadokawa Shoten / ESP; EU: Swing! Entertainment Media AG; NA: Conspiracy Entertainment
- Director: Atsushi Ii
- Producer: Yōichi Miyaji
- Designers: Shinya Togo; Tomonari Matsumoto
- Artist: Masato Natsumoto
- Writer: Ryō Mizuno
- Platform: Dreamcast
- Release: JP: 29 June 2000; EU: 15 December 2000; NA: 14 March 2001
- Genre: Action role-playing
- Mode: Single-player

Record of Lodoss War: Advent of Cardice (Note: Japanese: RECORD OF LODOSS WAR 〜ロードス島戦記 邪神降臨〜, Hepburn: RECORD OF LODOSS WAR 〜Rōdosu-Tō Senki: Jashin Kōrin〜 (Note: (Record of Lodoss War in North America and Europe))) is an action role-playing game developed by Neverland for the Dreamcast. It was released in Japan on 29 June 2000; in Europe on 15 December; and in North America on 14 March 2001. It's based on the fantasy novel series Record of Lodoss War.

== Gameplay ==
Gameplay screenshot

At each experience level the player character's hit point capacity increases; however, other character statistics are based on the blacksmith's cash-in advancement system. The hero gathers mithrill and plaques for the blacksmith. When the hero supplies him with a plaque and the requisite amount of mithrill, the blacksmith enhances the hero's weapon or armor by inlaying it with mithrill runes. Each plaque is emblazoned with a magic spell which, when transcribed onto armor or a weapon, augment's a specific statistic. The spell on a "Strength +5" plaque increments the hero's strength statistic by five. As long as the hero provides enough mithrill, the blacksmith can transcribe the same spell repeatedly to compound the effect. However, when the hero finds new armaments, he does not have to spend more mithrill to transcribe spells all over again. This is because the blacksmith can transform old equipment to match newly obtained equipment. For example: When the player finds a better sword, the blacksmith can reforge the hero's current sword to replicate the new one, while retaining all previous inscriptions. Even so, the blacksmith cannot convert one type of armament (such as a helmet) into another (such as a battle axe). As the player progresses through the game world, mithrill becomes more readily available. There is also a traditional level and experience system in place, but it only increases the character's HP.

== Plot ==
The game follows the adventures of a hero who has been resurrected by the wizard Wart to defeat Cardice (sometimes transliterated as Kardis or Kardiss), the dark goddess of destruction.

== Reception ==
Reception

Aggregate score
Aggregator	Score
Metacritic	76/100

Review scores
Publication	Score
AllGame	4/5
Computer and Video Games	4/5
Electronic Gaming Monthly	8.17/10 (Note: Three critics of Electronic Gaming Monthly gave the game each a score of 9/10, 7.5/10, and 8/10.)
Famitsu	30/40
Game Informer	8.5/10
GameSpot	6.8/10
GameSpy	7/10
IGN	8.7/10
Next Generation	3/5
RPGFan	89%
X-Play	2/5

The game received "generally favorable reviews" according to the review aggregation website Metacritic. Greg Orlando of NextGen commended the game's graphics, but was critical to its "weak" gameplay and combat system. In Japan, Famitsu gave it a score of 30 out of 40. Uncle Dust of GamePro said, "Overall, this RPG is nicely done and fun to play. With a few tweaks to the graphics and sounds, it could've been a very good game. As it is, fans of the Lodoss War series, as well as hack-n-slash role-playing nuts, should definitely take notice." (Note: GamePro gave the game 3.5/5 for graphics, 3/5 for sound, and two 4/5 scores for control and fun factor.)
