= Shining Force =

1992 video game

- North American cover art
- Developers: Climax Entertainment; Sonic! Software Planning (Note: Game Boy Advance version developed by Amusement Vision.)
- Publishers: Sega: Game Boy Advance; EU: THQ; NA: Atlus; JP: Sega
- Directors: Yasuhiro Taguchi; Kenji Orimo
- Producer: Hiroyuki Takahashi
- Designer: Hiroyuki Takahashi
- Artists: Hidehiro Yoshida; Yoshitaka Tamaki
- Writers: Masaki Wachi; Kenji Orimo; Haruki Kodra; Hiroyuki Takahashi
- Composer: Masahiko Yoshimura
- Series: Shining
- Platforms: Sega Genesis, Game Boy Advance, iOS, Windows, Linux, macOS
- Release: March 20, 1992: Genesis; JP: March 20, 1992; NA: May 1993; EU: July 1993 Game Boy Advance; EU: April 30, 2004; NA: June 8, 2004; JP: August 5, 2004 iOS July 29, 2010 Windows January 26, 2011 Linux, macOS May 29, 2018
- Genre: Tactical role-playing
- Mode: Single-player

Shining Force: The Legacy of Great Intention (Note: Shining Force: The Legacy of Great Intention (シャイニング・フォース 神々の遺産, Shainingu Fōsu: Kamigami no Isan; lit. "Shining Force: The Legacy of the Gods")), commonly referred to as Shining Force, is a 1992 turn-based tactical role-playing game developed by Climax Entertainment and Sonic! Software Planning and published by Sega for the Sega Genesis. It is the second entry of the Shining series, following 1991's Shining in the Darkness. While primarily a traditional fantasy-themed game, it contains some science fiction elements.

The game has been re-released for various platforms: in Sega Smash Pack Volume 1 for the Dreamcast and Sega Smash Pack 2 for Microsoft Windows, in Sonic's Ultimate Genesis Collection for Xbox 360 and PlayStation 3, and as a standalone game for the Wii Virtual Console and Windows via Steam. Additionally, a remake was released for the Game Boy Advance in 2004 under the title Shining Force: Resurrection of the Dark Dragon. In 2010, the game was released for iOS but was discontinued in 2015. It was re-released again on the Nintendo Classics service in 2021.

== Gameplay ==

Top: Max preparing to attack.
Bottom: A battle taking place.

Shining Force is a turn-based tactical role-playing game. Battles take place in square grids, and each unit occupies one square. Each unit can move up to a fixed amount of squares along the battlefield, determined by its Move statistic. Depending on its location relative to enemies and to allies, a unit can also perform one action: attack, cast a spell, use an item, or search the area. Some commands, such as equipping or dropping items, do not count as actions. The order of turns is determined by the unit's agility score and a random seed.

As is most common for the RPG genre, units become stronger by fighting enemies or by performing other actions in battle, such as healing allies. These actions give the units experience points (EXP), which allow them to gain levels.

In Shining Force, each allied unit is represented by a character with his or her own background and personality, much like in the Fire Emblem series. Although there are no "generic" units, except on the enemy side, most characters contribute little or nothing to the plot upon joining the player army.

Each allied unit also has a class, which defines a set of abilities for that unit and determines the spells and equipment they have access to. A unit can be promoted to another class at any level between 10 or 20. Upon promotion the character's level resets to 1 and statistics are reduced by a fixed amount, although they begin higher if the character had been promoted to a higher level.

Battle goals for the player are fairly simple: kill all enemies, kill the enemies' leader, or advance to a town or landmark. The enemy side wins if they kill the player's leader, Max, or if the player chooses to escape the battle by casting Egress. Even if the player army is defeated, the player can recover allies and retry the battle. The Force keeps any experience that is obtained, regardless of the battle's outcome. Thus, there is no Game Over, and the player's army gets stronger even upon its defeat, although Max's death results in the player losing half of their money.

Shining Force also possesses an exploration mode that occurs outside of battle. This gameplay mode is essentially a Japanese-style traditional RPG, along the lines of Final Fantasy or Dragon Quest, although there are no labyrinths and only a few puzzles to solve. In this mode, the player's army is represented by Max, who is able to walk around, interact with people, find treasure, buy equipment and items, outfit the army, and choose which of the army's members will be used in battle.

== Plot ==
The game opens in the Kingdom of Guardiana, in the land of Rune. The protagonist, Max, is sent on a mission to prevent the evil Kane, who commands the hordes of Runefaust, from opening the Shining Path and resurrecting Dark Dragon. Along the way, Max recruits a number of allies to join the Shining Force. They eventually find that both Kane and King Ramladu are under the control of the manipulative Darksol. Darksol ultimately succeeds in reviving Dark Dragon, but Max seals the creature away using the power of the Chaos Breaker, a sword created by merging a sword of light with Kane's sword of darkness.

== Development and release ==
Despite being the sequel to the successful Shining in the Darkness, Sega allotted only a minimal budget to the development of Shining Force. Contrary to popular assumption, Shining Force was not influenced by archetypal tactical RPG Fire Emblem: Shadow Dragon and the Blade of Light. In fact, when asked about the game, lead Shining Force developer Hiroyuki Takahashi remarked: "The tempo of that title was so bad that it wasn't something I even wanted to play." Takahashi recalled that Shining Force was chiefly inspired by Dragon Quest. Asking himself how he and the rest of the development team could "take the battles from Dragon Quest and make them more fun", he drew inspiration from an obscure Japanese PC game called Silver Ghost, "a simulation action type of game where you had to direct, oversee and command multiple characters".

The game was remade in 2004 for the Game Boy Advance under the title Shining Force: Resurrection of the Dark Dragon. The changes included an expanded plot, three new playable characters, three new battles, ramping difficulty system and some tweaks in the gameplay. One of the new characters can use "cards" in battle, and turn order is determined solely by a unit's speed stat and can be checked at any time from a list, allowing the player to plan out battles with greater certainty. The remake features a ramping difficulty system: every time a playthrough is successfully completed, a player earns a star and all enemies get a boost in stats for the next playthrough. The game has also had a rerelease for iOS, which has been removed from the App Store by Sega.

The game was released for Wii via Virtual Console in Japan on July 10, 2007, in North America on July 23, 2007, and in Europe on August 3, 2007.

== Reception ==
Contemporary reception

Review scores
Publication	Score
Game Informer	8/10
Player One	94%
Mega	92%
Mega Force	95%
Sega Pro	93%
Mega Zone	90%
Power Unlimited	89%

In Japan, it topped the Famitsu sales chart in April 1992. Power Unlimited gave the game a score of 89% "Shining Force is a fantastic RPG in itself, with a great story, good graphics and a sublime battle mode, but the special thing is that the game is much more accessible than most RPGs."

The game was well received. Mega placed the game at #33 in their Top Mega Drive Games of All Time.

GameSpot named Resurrection of the Dark Dragon the best Game Boy Advance game of July 2004.

=== Retrospective ===
Retrospective reception

Aggregate scores
Aggregator	Score
GameRankings	SMD: 80% GBA: 75%
Metacritic	GBA: 77/100 iOS: 84/100

Review score
Publication	Score
AllGame	GBA: 3/5

In 2004, readers of Retro Gamer voted this "truly unique RPG masterpiece" 86th top retro game, with the staff additionally calling it "one of the greatest Megadrive games of all time and a definite office favourite."
