= List of role-playing video games: 1996 to 1997 =

This is a comprehensive index of commercial role-playing video games (RPGs), sorted chronologically by year. Information regarding release platform, release type, RPG subgenre, game setting, developers, publishers, and country of origin is provided where available. The table can be sorted by clicking on the small boxes next to the column headings.

This list includes all RPG subgenres, including MMORPGs, Action RPGs and Tactical RPGs. This list does not include MUDs and Roguelikes by default, unless they have an additional RPG subgenre. For standalone lists on these subgenres, see List of MUDs and List of roguelikes

== Legend ==
Video game platforms
3DO	3DO	AMI	Amiga	DC	Dreamcast
DOS	PC DOS / MS-DOS, Windows 3.X	GB	Game Boy	GEN	Genesis / Mega Drive
LIN	Linux, SteamOS	MAC	Classic Mac OS, 2001 and before	MSX2	MSX2
NEOCD	Neo Geo CD	PC98	PC-9800 series	PCFX	PC-FX
PS1	PlayStation 1	SAT	Sega Saturn	SCD	Sega CD / Mega-CD
SNES	Super NES / Super Famicom / Super Comboy	WIN	Windows, all versions Windows 95 and up	WIN3X	Term not found

Types of releases
Compilation	A compilation, anthology or collection of several titles, usually (but not always) belonging to the same series
Early access	A game launched in early access is unfinished and thus might contain bugs and glitches or have some of the content missing
Episodic	An episodic video game that is released in batches over a period of time
Expansion	A large-scale DLC to an already existing game that adds new story, areas and additions and/or changes to the game's mechanics
Full release	A full release of a game that launched in early access first
Limited	A special release (often called "Limited" or "Collector's Edition") with bonus collector's material. Often provided to people who pre-order a game
Port	The game first appeared on a different platform and a port was made. The game is like the original, with few or no differences
Remake	The game is an enhanced remake of an original, made using a new engine and/or assets and thus containing completely new sound, graphics and possibly changes to the story and/or gameplay
Remaster	The game is a remaster of an original, released on the same or different platform, with (usually minor) changes to graphics, sound and/or gameplay
Rerelease	The game was re-released on the same platform with no or only minor changes

Video game genres
Action RPG	Action role-playing game	Dungeon crawl	Dungeon crawl	JRPG	Japanese-style role-playing game
MMORPG	Massively multiplayer online RPG	Monster tamer	Monster-taming game	MUD	Multi-user dungeon
Real-time	Real-time game	Roguelike	Roguelike, Roguelite	Sandbox	Sandbox game
Soulslike	Soulslike	Tactical RPG	Tactical role-playing game	Turn-based	Turn-based game

== List ==
Year	Title	Developer	Publisher	Setting	Platform	Subgenre	Series/Notes	COO
1996 (??)	Adventures of Hourai High			Fantasy	SNES			
1996 (JP)	Airs Adventure エアーズアドベンチャー	Game Studio	Game Studio	Fantasy	SAT			JP
1996 (JP); 1997 (NA)	Albert Odyssey: Legend of Eldean	Sunsoft	Sunsoft; Working Designs	Fantasy	SAT	JRPG (turn-based)	Albert Odyssey	JP
1996 (JP)	Arabian Nights: Sabaku no Seirei-ō	Pandora Box	Takara	Fantasy	SNES	JRPG (turn-based/card-based)		JP
1996 (JP)	Arc the Lad II	ARC	SCEI	Fantasy	PS1	Tactical RPG	Arc the Lad	JP
1996 (JP)	Arunamu No Kiba Juuzokujuu Nishinto Densetsu; Fang of Alnam アルナムの牙 獣族十二神徒伝説	Right Stuff		Fantasy	PS1 (Port)			JP
1996 (JP)	Bahamut Lagoon バハムートラグーン	Square	Square	Fantasy	SNES	Tactical RPG		JP
1996 (JP)	Bakumatsu Kourinden ONI 幕末降臨伝ONI	Pandora Box	Banpresto	Fantasy	SNES		Kourinden ONI	JP
1996 (JP)	Blue Breaker: Ken yori mo hohoemi o	HuneX	NEC	Fantasy	PCFX		Blue Breaker	JP
1996 (JP)	Blue Forest Monogatari			Fantasy	3DO			JP
1996 (JP)	Daikaijuu Monogatari II 大貝獣物語II	AIM; Birthday; Denki-Mirai; ADS	Hudson Soft	Fantasy	SNES		Daikaijuu Monogatari	JP
1996 (JP)	Dark Half		Enix	Fantasy	SNES			JP
1996 (NA)	Diablo	Blizzard North	Blizzard	Fantasy	WIN	Action RPG; Roguelike	Diablo	NA
1996 (NA)	Dragon Force ドラゴンフォース	Sega	Working Designs	Fantasy	SAT	Tactical RPG	Dragon Force	JP
1996 (JP)	Dragon Knight IV ドラゴンナイト4	ELF	Banpresto	Fantasy	SNES (Port)	Tactical RPG; Eroge	Dragon Knight	JP
1996 (JP)	Dragon Warrior III; Dragon Quest III	Chunsoft	Enix	Fantasy	SNES (Port)	JRPG	Dragon Quest	JP
1996 (JP)	Energy Breaker	Neverland		Fantasy	SNES	Tactical RPG		JP
1996 (JP)	FEDA Remake!: Emblem of Justice	Yanoman		Fantasy	SAT (Remake)	Tactical RPG	FEDA	JP
1996 (JP)	Fire Emblem: Seisen no Keifu	Intelligent	Nintendo	Fantasy	SNES	Tactical RPG	Fire Emblem	JP
1996 (JP)	Gulliver Boy	Hudson Soft	Bandai	Fantasy	SNES (Port)		Based on the anime Gulliver Boy	JP
1996 (JP)	Gulliver Boy	Hudson Soft	Hudson Soft	Fantasy	SAT (Port)		Based on the anime Gulliver Boy	JP
1996 (JP/NA)	King's Field III; King's Field II in NA	From	Agetec	Fantasy	PS1	Dungeon crawl (real-time)	King's Field	JP
1996 (JP)	Langrisser III ラングリッサーIII	Masaya	NCS	Fantasy	SAT	Tactical RPG	Langrisser	JP
1996 (JP)	Langrisser, Der; Langrisser II	Masaya	NCS	Fantasy	PCFX (Remake)	Tactical RPG	Langrisser	JP
1996 (JP)	Legend of Heroes IV, The: A Tear of Vermillion; The Legend of Heroes: A Tear of Vermillion 英雄伝説IV「朱紅い雫」	Nihon Falcom	Nihon Falcom	Fantasy	PC98		Dragon Slayer: The Legend of Heroes	JP
1996 (WW)	The Legend of Oasis	Ancient	Sega	Fantasy	SAT	Action RPG	Prequel to Beyond Oasis	JP
1996 (JP)	Lennus 2	Copya Systems	Asmik Corporation	Fantasy	SNES	JRPG	Lennus	JP
1996 (JP)	Linkle Liver Story	Nextech	Sega	Fantasy	SAT	Action RPG		JP
1996 (JP)	Madara Saga	Datam Polystar	Datam Polystar	Fantasy	SNES		Based on the manga Madara	JP
1996 (JP)	Madou Monogatari I	Compile		Fantasy	SNES (Port)	Dungeon crawler	Madou Monogatari	JP
1996 (JP)	Metajo	R-Force	R-Force	Fantasy	PC98	Tactical RPG		JP
1996 (JP)	Monstania	Amccus; Bits Laboratory	Pack-In-Video	Fantasy	SNES	Tactical RPG		JP
1996 (JP)	Moon Light Saga	Maple Yard	Maple Yard		MSX2			JP
1996 (JP)	Ogre Battle: March of the Black Queen	Quest	Riverhill	Fantasy	SAT (Port)	Tactical RPG	Ogre Battle	JP
1996 (JP)	Only You: The Decadent Juliets; Only You -世紀末のジュリエット達-	Alice Soft		Fantasy	PC98	Eroge		JP
1996 (JP)	Oukoku no Gran Chef			Fantasy	3DO			
1996 (JP); 1998 (NA/AU); 1999 (EU)	Pocket Monsters Red; Pocket Monsters Green(Pokémon Red Version and Pokémon Blue Version)	Game Freak Inc.	Nintendo	Modern; Fantasy	GB	Monster raising	Pokémon	JP
1996 (JP); 1998 (NA/AU); 1999 (EU)	Pocket Monsters Blue	Game Freak Inc.	Nintendo	Modern; Fantasy	GB	Monster raising	Pokémon	JP
1996 (JP)	Popolocrois Monogatari	SCE	SCE	Fantasy	PS1	Tactical RPG	Based on the manga PoPoLoCrois	JP
1996 (JP/NA)	Revelations: Persona	Atlus	Atlus	Modern; Fantasy	PS1	JRPG	Megami Tensei: Persona	JP
1996 (JP)	Riglord Saga 2	Microcabin	Sega	Fantasy	SAT	Tactical RPG	Mystaria: The Realms of Lore	JP
1996 (JP)	RPG Maker 2	Success	ASCII	Fantasy	SNES	RPG-creation software	RPG Maker	JP
1996 (JP)	Sakura Wars	Sega	Sega; Red Ent.	Steampunk	SAT	Tactical RPG	Sakura Wars	JP
1996 (JP)	Shadowrun	Group SNE	Compile	Cyberpunk Fantasy	SCD	Adventure/RPG hybrid	Based on the Shadowrun franchise by FASA	JP
1996 (JP)	Shin Super Robot Wars	Banpresto	Banpresto	Sci-Fi	PS1	Tactical RPG	Super Robot Wars	JP
1996 (JP); 1997 (NA/EU)	Shining the Holy Ark	Sonic Software Planning	Sega	Fantasy	SAT	Dungeon crawl	Shining	JP
1996 (WW)	The Speris Legacy	Binary Emotions	Team17	Fantasy	AMI	Action RPG		GB
1996 (JP)	Star Ocean: Fantastic Space Odyssey	tri-Ace	Enix	Fantasy	SNES	JRPG	Star Ocean	JP
1996 (JP/NA)	Super Mario RPG	Square	Nintendo	Fantasy	SNES	JRPG (turn-based)	Mario RPG	JP
1996 (JP)	Super Robot Taisen Gaiden: Masō Kishin - The Lord Of Elemental	Banpresto	Banpresto	Sci-Fi	SNES	Tactical RPG	Super Robot Wars	JP
1996 (JP)	Sword & Sorcery	Microcabin	Microcabin	Fantasy	SAT	JRPG (turn-based)	Enhanced remake of 3DO game	JP
1996 (NA)	Sword of Hope II	Kemco	Kemco	Fantasy	GB	Dungeon crawl	Sword of Hope	JP
1996 (JP)	Tactics Ogre: Let Us Cling Together	Quest	Riverhill Soft	Fantasy	SAT (Port)	Tactical RPG	Ogre Battle	JP
1996 (JP); 1997 (NA)	Tail of the Sun	Artdink	JP: Artdink; NA: Sony Computer Entertainment	Fantasy	PS1	Action RPG		JP
1996 (JP/NA)	Tecmo's Deception: Invitation to Darkness	Tecmo	Tecmo	Fantasy	PS1	Action RPG	Deception	JP
1996 (JP)	Traverse: Starlight & Prairie			Fantasy	SNES			JP
1996 (JP)	Treasure Hunter G	Sting	Square	Fantasy	SNES	Tactical RPG		JP
1996 (JP)	Treasure of the Rudras	Square	Square	Fantasy	SNES	JRPG		JP
1996 (JP); 1997 (NA/EU)	Vandal Hearts	Konami	Konami	Fantasy	PS1	Tactical RPG	Vandal Hearts	JP
1996 (JP); 1997 (NA); 1998 (PAL)	Wild Arms	Media.Vision	SCE	Western	PS1	JRPG	Wild Arms	JP
1996 (JP)	Wizardry Gaiden IV			Fantasy	SNES	WRPG	Wizardry Gaiden	JP
1996 (TW)	Xin Qigai Wangzi 新乞丐王子	C&E Inc.	C&E Inc.	Fantasy	GEN	JRPG	Adapted from The Prince and the Pauper	TW
1996 (??)	Ys V Expert	Nihon Falcom	Nihon Falcom	Fantasy	SNES (Rerel)	Action RPG	Ys	JP
1997 (JP)	Alnam no Tsubasa: Shouchiri no Sora no Achira e Wing of Alnam アルナムの翼 焼塵の空の彼方へ	Right Stuff		Fantasy	PS1		Wing of Alnam	JP
1997 (JP)	Atelier Marie: The Alchemist of Salburg	Gust		Fantasy	PS1	JRPG	Atelier	JP
1997 (JP); 1998 (NA/PAL)	Breath of Fire III	Capcom	Capcom	Fantasy	PS1	JRPG	Breath of Fire	JP
1997 (JP)	BS Fire Emblem: Akaneia Senki	Intelligent	Nintendo	Fantasy	SNES	Tactical RPG	Fire Emblem	JP
1997 (JP)	Chocobo's Mysterious Dungeon	Square	Square	Fantasy	PS1	Roguelike	Fushigi no Dungeon; Chocobo's Mysterious Dungeon	JP
1997 (JP)	Dark Law: Meaning of Death	ASCII	ASCII	Fantasy	SNES	Tactical RPG	Dark Lord	JP
1997 (JP)	Dragon Knight IV ドラゴンナイト4	ELF	Banpresto	Fantasy	SAT (Port), PS1 (Port)	Tactical RPG; Eroge	Dragon Knight	JP
1997 (JP)	Dragon Knight IV ドラゴンナイト4	ELF	NEC	Fantasy	PCFX (Port)	Tactical RPG; Eroge	Dragon Knight	JP
1997 (WW)	Faery Tale Adventure II: Halls of the Dead	The Dreamers Guild	Encore Software	Fantasy	WIN, DOS	Action RPG	Sequel to The Faery Tale Adventure	US
1997 (JP)	Farland Story	TGL	TGL	Fantasy	PS1 (Port)	Tactical RPG	Farland Story	JP
1997 (JP)	FEDA 2: White Surge the Platoon	Yanoman		Fantasy	PS1	Tactical RPG	FEDA	JP
1997 (JP); 2001 (NA); 2002 (PAL)	Final Fantasy IV	Square	Square	Fantasy	PS1 (Port)	JRPG	Final Fantasy	JP
1997 (JP/NA/EU/AU)	Final Fantasy VII	Square	Square; SCE	Sci-Fi; Fantasy	PS1	JRPG	Final Fantasy	JP
1997 (JP); 1998 (NA)	Final Fantasy Tactics ファイナルファンタジータクティクス	Square	Square; SCE	Fantasy	PS1	Tactical RPG	Final Fantasy Tactics; Ivalice series	JP
1997 (JP)	Front Mission 2	Square	Square	Sci-Fi	PS1	Tactical RPG	Front Mission	JP
1997 (JP)	Galaxy Fraulein Yuna 3: Lightning Angel	Hudson Soft		Sci-Fi	SAT	Tactical RPG	Galaxy Fraulein Yuna	JP
1997 (JP)	Grandia	Game Arts	ESP	Fantasy	SAT	JRPG (turn-based)	Grandia	JP
1997 (JP); 1998 (NA); 1999 (PAL)	Granstream Saga, The	Shade	THQ	Fantasy	PS1	Action RPG		JP
1997 (JP)	Gunmans Proof			Fantasy	SNES			JP
1997 (JP)	Langrisser I & II ラングリッサーI&II			Fantasy	PS1 (Remake)	Tactical RPG	Langrisser: Remake and compilation of I and II	JP
1997 (JP)	Langrisser IV ラングリッサーIV	CareerSoft		Fantasy	SAT, PS1	Tactical RPG	Langrisser	JP
1997 (JP)	Magic School Lunar!	Game Arts; Studio Alex	ESP; Kadokawa Shoten	Fantasy	SAT (Remake)	JRPG	Lunar	JP
1997 (JP); 1998 (NA)	Legend of the River King 川のぬし釣り3	Tose	Natsume (NA)		GB		River King	JP
1997 (JP); 1998 (NA)	Master of Monsters: Disciples of Gaia	ASCII	ASCII; Toshiba	Fantasy	PS1	Tactical RPG		JP
1997 (JP)	Milandra			Fantasy	SNES	Roguelike		JP
1997 (JP)	Moon: Remix RPG Adventure	Love-de-Lic	ASCII	Fantasy	PS1	Adventure RPG		JP
1997 (JP)	Ogre Battle: Limited Edition	Enix		Fantasy	PS1 (Comp)	Tactical RPG	Ogre Battle: Compilation of March of the Black Queen and Tactics Ogre	JP
1997 (JP/NA)	Ogre Battle: March of the Black Queen	Quest	Artdink; Atlus	Fantasy	PS1 (Port)	Tactical RPG	Ogre Battle	JP
1997 (JP)	Princess Crown	Atlus	Atlus	Fantasy	SAT	Action RPG	Princess Crown	JP
1997 (JP)	Ronde 輪舞曲	MIT	Atlus	Fantasy	SAT	Tactical RPG	Megami Tensei: Majin Tensei	JP
1997 (JP); 2000 (NA)	RPG Maker(NA); RPG Maker 3(JP)	Kuusou Kagaku	Enterbrain; Agetec	Fantasy	PS1	RPG-creation software	RPG Maker	JP
1997 (JP); 1998 (NA)	SaGa Frontier	Square	Square; SCE	Fantasy	PS1	JRPG	SaGa	JP
1997 (JP); 1998 (NA/EU)	Shining Force III	Camelot	Sega	Fantasy	SAT	Tactical RPG	Shining	JP
1997 (JP)	Shinsetsu Samurai Spirits Bushidō Retsuden	SNK; Asatsu; Fuji TV	SNK	Fantasy	NEOCD, SAT, PS1	JRPG	Spinoff of Samurai Shodown fighting games	JP
1997 (JP)	Söldnerschild S	Koei		Fantasy	SAT	Tactical RPG	Söldnerschild	JP
1997 (JP)	Super Robot Wars F	Banpresto	Banpresto	Sci-Fi	SAT	Tactical RPG	Super Robot Wars	JP
1997 (JP); 1998 (NA)	Tactics Ogre: Let Us Cling Together	Quest	Atlus	Fantasy	PS1 (Port)	Tactical RPG	Ogre Battle	JP
1997 (JP); 1998 (NA)	Tales of Destiny	Wolf Team	Namco	Fantasy	PS1	Action RPG	Tales	JP
1997 (JP)	Tengai Makyō: Daiyon no Mokushiroku	Red Ent.	Hudson Soft	Fantasy	SAT	JRPG	Tengai Makyō	JP
1997 (JP)	Ultima Underworld: The Stygian Abyss	Blue Sky Productions	Origin	Fantasy	PS1 (Port)	Action RPG (UU style)	Ultima Underworld	NA
1997 (JP)	Vandal Hearts	Konami	Konami	Fantasy	SAT (Port)	Tactical RPG	Vandal Hearts	JP
1996 (NA)	AD&D Masterpiece Collection	Mindscape	SSI; Mindscape	Fantasy	DOS (Comp)	Tactical RPG; Action RPG	Dungeons & Dragons franchise: Compilation of the Dark Sun and Ravenloft games	NA
1996 (NA)	Birthright: The Gorgon's Alliance	Synergistic	Sierra	Fantasy	DOS, WIN	Tactical RPG; RTS/RPG	Dungeons & Dragons franchise (Birthright)	NA
1996 (NA)	Deathkeep	Lion	SSI	Fantasy	WIN (Port)	FPS/RPG	Dungeons & Dragons franchise	NA
1996 (NA)	Elder Scrolls II, The: Daggerfall	Bethesda	Bethesda	Fantasy	DOS	Action RPG (UU style)	The Elder Scrolls	NA
1996 (NA)	Exile II: Crystal Souls	Spiderweb	Spiderweb	Fantasy	MAC, WIN, WIN3X	Tactical RPG	Exile	NA
1996 (NA)	Exile III: Ruined World	Spiderweb	Spiderweb	Fantasy	LIN, MAC, WIN, WIN3X	Tactical RPG	Exile	NA
1996 (JP)	Farland Saga: Toki no Douhyou	TGL	TGL	Fantasy	DOS	Tactical RPG	Farland Saga	JP
1996 (JP)	Farland Story: Kamigami no Isen; Farland Story 6	TGL	TGL	Fantasy	DOS	Tactical RPG	Farland Saga	JP
1996 (NA)	Nemesis: The Wizardry Adventure	Sir-Tech	Sir-Tech	Fantasy	DOS	Adventure RPG	Spin-off of Wizardry	NA
1996 (NA)	Quest for Glory Anthology	Sierra	Sierra	Fantasy	DOS (Comp), WIN (Comp), WIN3X (Comp)	Adventure RPG	Quest for Glory: Compilation of the first four games	NA
1996 (DE); 1997 (NA/EU)	Realms of Arkania: Shadows over Riva (NA, UK) 巫術闇影 (CN); Černé Oko: Stíny nad Rivou (CZ); Das Schwarze Auge: Schatten über Riva (DE); El Ojo Negro: La sombra sobre Riva (ES)	Attic	Topware (DE); U.S. Gold (EU); Sir-Tech (NA)	Fantasy	DOS		Das Schwarze Auge franchise Realms of Arkania	DE
1996 (NA)	Ultima VIII: Pagan - Gold Edition	Origin	EA	Fantasy	DOS (Rerel)	WRPG	Ultima	NA
1996 (NA/UK)	Wizardry Gold	Sir-Tech	Sir-Tech	Fantasy; Sci-Fi	MAC (Remake), WIN (Remake)	WRPG	Wizardry	NA
1997 (NA)	An Elder Scrolls Legend: Battlespire	Bethesda	Bethesda	Fantasy	DOS, WIN	Action RPG	The Elder Scrolls	NA
1997 (NA)	Betrayal in Antara	Sierra	Sierra	Fantasy	WIN, WIN3X	WRPG	Uses the Betrayal at Krondor engine	NA
1997 (NA)	Blood Omen: Legacy of Kain	Silicon Knights	Activision	Fantasy; Horror	WIN	Action-adventure/JRPG	Legacy of Kain	NA
1997 (NA)	Diablo: Hellfire	Synergistic	Sierra	Fantasy	WIN	Action RPG. Roguelike	Diablo	NA
1997 (NA)	Fallout	Interplay	Interplay	Post-apocalyptic	DOS, WIN	WRPG	Fallout	NA
1997 (NA)	Fallout	Interplay	MacPlay	Post-apocalyptic	MAC (Port)	WRPG	Fallout	NA
1997 (JP)	Farland Saga 2: Toki no Michishirube	TGL	TGL	Fantasy	WIN	Tactical RPG	Farland Saga	JP
1997 (NA)	Final Fantasy VII	Square	Eidos	Sci-Fi; Fantasy	WIN	JRPG	Final Fantasy	JP
1997 (NA/UK)	Forgotten Realms Archives, The	SSI	Interplay	Fantasy	DOS (Comp), WIN (Comp)	Tactical RPG; WRPG; Action RPG	Dungeons & Dragons franchise: Compilation of nearly every video game set in the Forgotten Realms	NA
1997 (NA)	Incubation: Time Is Running Out	Blue Byte	Blue Byte	Sci-Fi	WIN	Tactical RPG	Battle Isle	DE
1997 (NA)	Incubation: The Wilderness Missions	Blue Byte	Blue Byte	Sci-Fi	WIN	Tactical RPG	Battle Isle	DE
1997 (NA)	Lands of Lore: Guardians of Destiny	Westwood	Virgin	Fantasy	DOS, WIN	Dungeon crawl	Lands of Lore	NA
1997 (JP)	Medarot: Kabuto Version	Natsume Co., Ltd.	Imagineer	Science Fiction	GB	Action RPG	Medabots	JP
1997 (JP)	Medarot: Kuwagata Version	Natsume Co., Ltd.	Imagineer	Science Fiction	GB	Action RPG	Medabots	JP
1997 (NA)	Quest for Glory: Collection Series	Sierra	Sierra	Fantasy	DOS (Comp), WIN3X (Comp)	Adventure RPG	Quest for Glory: Compilation of first four games	NA
1997 (JP)	RPG Maker 95	Enterbrain	ASCII	N/A	WIN	RPG construction tool	RPG Maker	JP
1999 (JP)	Sorcerian Forever	Nihon Falcom	Nihon Falcom	Fantasy	WIN	Action RPG	Sorcerian	JP
1997 (NA); 1998 (EU)	Ultima Collection	Origin	EA	Fantasy	DOS (Rerel), WIN (Port)	WRPG	Ultima: Rerelease and port of the first eight games and Akalabeth: World of Doom	NA
1997 (JP); 1998 (TW/KR)	Vantage Master ヴァンテージ・マスター	Nihon Falcom	Nihon Falcom	Fantasy	WIN	Tactical RPG	Vantage Master	JP
1997 (JP)	Vantage Master V2; Vantage Master Online	Nihon Falcom		Fantasy	WIN	Tactical RPG	Vantage Master	JP
1997 (JP)	Wizardry: Llylgamyn Saga	Solition	ASCII	Fantasy; Sci-Fi	WIN (Comp)	Dungeon crawl	Wizardry: Remake and compilation of I through III	NA
