= List of tactical role-playing video games: 1980s to 1994 =

This is a comprehensive index of commercial tactical role-playing games (Tactical RPGs), sorted chronologically by year. Information regarding release platform, release type, game setting, developers, publishers, and country of origin is provided where available. The table can be sorted by clicking on the small boxes next to the column headings.

== Legend ==
Video game platforms
AMI	Amiga	AMI32	Amiga CD32	APPII	Apple II family
ATRST	Atari ST, Atari Falcon	BAR	barcode scanner games	C64	Commodore 64
DOS	DOS / MS-DOS	FM7	FM-7	FMT	FM Towns
GB	Game Boy	GEN	Sega Genesis / Mega Drive	GG	Game Gear
MSX	MSX	MSX2	MSX2	NES	Nintendo Entertainment System / Famicom
PC80	PC-8000 series	PC88	PC-8800 series	PC98	PC-9800 series
PCD	TurboGrafx-CD / PC Engine CD-ROM²	SCD	Sega CD / Mega CD	SNES	Super Nintendo / Super; Famicom / Super Comboy
WIN	Microsoft Windows, all versions Windows 95 and up	X1	Sharp X1	X68K	X68000

Types of releases
Compilation	A compilation, anthology or collection of several titles, usually (but not always) belonging to the same series
Early access	A game launched in early access is unfinished and thus might contain bugs and glitches or have some of the content missing
Episodic	An episodic video game that is released in batches over a period of time
Expansion	A large-scale DLC to an already existing game that adds new story, areas and additions and/or changes to the game's mechanics
Full release	A full release of a game that launched in early access first
Limited	A special release (often called "Limited" or "Collector's Edition") with bonus collector's material. Often provided to people who pre-order a game
Port	The game first appeared on a different platform and a port was made. The game is like the original, with few or no differences
Remake	The game is an enhanced remake of an original, made using new engine and/or assets and thus containing completely new sound, graphics and possibly changes to the story and/or gameplay
Remaster	The game is a remaster of an original, released on the same or different platform, with minor changes to graphics, sound and/or gameplay
Rerelease	The game was re-released on the same platform with no or only minor changes

== List ==
Year	Title	Developer	Publisher	Setting	Platform	Series/Notes
1982 (JP)	The Dragon and Princess	Koei	Koei	Fantasy	PC80	
1983 (JP)	Bokosuka Wars	Koji Sumii	ASCII	Fantasy	X1, MSX (Port), NES (Port)	RTS/RPG.
1983 (JP)	The Dragon and Princess	Koei	Koei	Fantasy	FM7 (Port)	
1983 (NA)	Galactic Adventures	SSI	SSI	Sci-Fi	APPII	
1987 (JP)	Tir-nan-og ティル・ナ・ノーグ	Alfa System		Fantasy	PC98	Series debuts.
1987 (INT)	Xconq	Stan Shebs, et al.	Stan Shebs, et al.			Open source. General purpose turn-based strategy engine with several Master of Monsters-like modules created using it after 1987.
1988 (NA)	Pool of Radiance	SSI	SSI	Fantasy	APPII, AMI, C64, DOS, NES, PC98	
1988 (NA)	BattleTech: The Crescent Hawk's Inception	Westwood	Infocom	Sci-Fi	APPII, AMI, C64, DOS, ARTST	
1988 (JP)	Silver Ghost	Kure Software Koubou	Kure Software Koubou	Fantasy	PC88	
1988 (JP)	Tir-nan-og II ティル・ナ・ノーグII	SystemSoft		Fantasy	PC98	Sequel to Tir-nan-og for PC98.
1989 (JP)	Master of Monsters	SystemSoft	SystemSoft	Fantasy	MSX	
1990 (EU)	Lords of Chaos	Mythos Games	Blade Software	Fantasy	AMI, C64	
1990 (JP)	Fire Emblem: Ankoku Ryū to Hikari no Ken	Intelligent	Nintendo	Fantasy	NES	Series debuts.
1990 (NA)	Buck Rogers: Countdown to Doomsday	SSI	SSI	Sci-Fi	AMI, C64, DOS, GEN	
1990 (JP)	Mōryō Senki MADARA	Konami	Konami	Fantasy	NES	
1990 (JP)	Tir-nan-og: The Forbidden Tower ティル・ナ・ノーグ 禁断の塔	SystemSoft		Fantasy	MSX2 (Port)	Port of Tir-nan-og for PC98.
1991 (JP)	2nd Super Robot Wars	Banpresto	Banpresto	Sci-Fi	NES	Sequel to Super Robot Wars.
1991 (JP)	Bahamut Senki	Sega	Sega	Fantasy	GEN	
1991 (JP)	Chaos World		Natsume	Fantasy	NES	
1991 (JP); 1992 (NA)	Crystal Warriors			Fantasy	GG	
1991 (JP/NA)	Master of Monsters	SystemSoft	SystemSoft	Fantasy	GEN (Port), PCD (Port)	Port of Master of Monsters for MSX.
1991 (JP)	Super Robot Wars	Banpresto	Banpresto	Sci-Fi	GB	Series debuts.
1991 (JP/NA)	Warsong; Langrisser ラングリッサー	CareerSoft	NCS; Treco	Fantasy	GEN	Series debuts.
1992 (JP)	Farland Story	TGL	TGL	Fantasy	DOS	Series debuts.
1992 (JP)	Fire Emblem Gaiden	Intelligent	Nintendo	Fantasy	NES	
1992 (JP)	Just Breed ジャストブリード	Enix	Enix	Fantasy	NES	
1992 (JP)	Little Master 2 リトルマスター2 雷光の騎士	Zener Works	Tokuma Shoten	Fantasy	GB	Sequel to Little Master.
1992 (JP)	Megami Tensei Gaiden: Last Bible 女神転生外伝 ラストバイブルシリーズ	MIT	Atlus	Fantasy	GG	Series debuts.
1992 (JP)	Shining Force Gaiden	Sonic!	Sega	Fantasy	GG	
1992 (JP); 1993 (NA/EU)	Shining Force: The Legacy of Great Intention; Shining Force シャイニング・フォース 神々の遺産	Sonic!	Sega	Fantasy	GEN	Series debuts.
1993 (JP)	3rd Super Robot Wars	Banpresto	Banpresto	Sci-Fi	SNES	Sequel to 2nd Super Robot Wars.
1993 (JP)	Albert Odyssey	Sunsoft	Sunsoft	Fantasy	SNES	Series debuts.
1993 (JP); 1994 (NA)	Dark Wizard	Sega	Sega	Fantasy	SCD	
1993 (JP)	Farland Story Denki: Arc Ou no Ensei; Farland Story 2	TGL	TGL	Fantasy	DOS	Sequel to Farland Story.
1993 (JP)	Little Master		Tokuma Shoten	Fantasy	GB	
1993 (JP); 1995 (NA)	Ogre Battle: March of the Black Queen	Quest	Quest; Enix	Fantasy	SNES	
1993 (JP); 1994 (EU/NA)	Shining Force II: Ancient Sealing; Shining Force II シャイニング・フォースII 古えの封印	Sonic!	Sega	Fantasy	GEN	Sequel to Shining Force Gaiden: Final Conflict.
1993 (JP); 1994 (NA)	Shining Force II: The Sword of Hajya	Sonic!	Sega	Fantasy	GG	Sequel to Shining Force Gaiden.
1993 (JP)	Super Barcode Wars バーコードバトラー戦記 スーパー戦士出撃せよ!	Epoch	Epoch	Sci-Fi	SNES, BAR	
1993 (JP)	Langrisser: The Descendants of Light ラングリッサー ～光輝の末裔～			Fantasy	PCD (Port)	Port of Warsong for GEN. Series debuts.
1994 (JP)	Albert Odyssey 2: Jashin no Taidou	Sunsoft	Sunsoft	Fantasy	SNES	
1994 (JP)	Dragon Knight IV ドラゴンナイト4	ELF	ELF	Fantasy	DOS (Port)	Eroge. Port of Dragon Knight IV for PC98. Sequel to Dragon Knight III.
1994 (JP)	Dragon Knight IV ドラゴンナイト4	ELF	ELF	Fantasy	FMT (Port), PC98, X68K (Port)	Eroge. Port of Dragon Knight IV for PC98. Sequel to Dragon Knight III.
1994 (JP)	Farland Story: Shirogane no Tsubasa; Farland Story 4	TGL	TGL	Fantasy	DOS	Sequel to Farland Story: Tenshi no Namida.
1994 (JP)	Farland Story: Tenshi no Namida; Farland Story 3	TGL	TGL	Fantasy	DOS	Sequel to Farland Story Denki: Arc Ou no Ensei.
1994 (JP)	FEDA: Emblem of Justice	Yanoman		Fantasy	SNES	
1994 (JP)	Fire Emblem: Monshō no Nazo	Intelligent	Nintendo	Fantasy	SNES	
1994 (NA)	Jagged Alliance	Madlab	Sir-Tech	Modern	DOS	Series debuts.
1994 (JP)	Langrisser II; Der Langrisser デア ラングリッサー	CareerSoft	NCS	Fantasy	GEN	Sequel to Warsong.
1994 (JP)	Little Master: Niji Iro no Maseki		Tokuma Shoten	Fantasy	SNES	
1994 (JP)	Majin Tensei 魔神転生	Atlus	Atlus	Fantasy	SNES	
1994 (??)	Power of the Hired			Fantasy	WIN (Port)	Port of Power of the Hired for SNES.
1994 (??)	Red Crystal	QQP		Fantasy	DOS	
1994 (JP); 1995 (NA/EU)	Shining Force CD	Sonic!	Sega	Fantasy	SCD (Remake)	Remake of Shining Force Gaiden and Shining Force Gaiden 2: Sword of Hajya for GG.
1994 (JP)	Super Robot Wars EX	Banpresto	Banpresto	Sci-Fi	SNES	
1994 (NA/EU)	X-COM: UFO Defense aka UFO: Enemy Unknown	MicroProse	MicroProse	Sci-Fi	DOS	Series debuts.
1994 (EU); 1995 (NA)	X-COM: UFO Defense	Mythos	MicroProse	Sci-Fi	AMI (Port), AMI32 (Port)	Port of X-COM: UFO Defense for DOS. Series debuts.
