= Dragon Knight =

Dragon Knight or The Dragon Knight may refer to:

- Dragon Knight (novel series), a series of fantasy novels by Gordon R. Dickson which began in 1976.
  - The Dragon Knight (novel), the second novel in the Dragon Knight series, released in 1990
- Dragon Knight (video game series), a series of hentai games by ELF, and (mostly hentai) anime based on those games
  1. Dragon Knight (video game), a 1989 video game
  2. Dragon Knight II, an MSX game released December 1990
  3. Dragon Knight III or Knights of Xentar, a 1991 multi-platform game
  4. Dragon Knight 4, a 1994 game
- Dragon Knight, a 1990 adventure scenario published for the Dragonlance campaign setting in the Dungeons & Dragons roleplaying game
- Kamen Rider: Dragon Knight, a 2009 television series adapted from Kamen Rider Ryuki
- The Dragon Knight (film), a 2011 Chinese animated film

== See also ==
- Dragon Knights, a 1990–2007 fantasy manga series by Mineko Ohkami
