= Brave Prove =

- Developer: Data West
- Publisher: Data West
- Director: Noboru Nishizawa
- Producer: Naokazu Akita
- Designers: Noboru Nishizawa; Kiyoshi Kato; Isamu Kondo
- Programmer: Noboru Nishizawa
- Platform: PlayStation
- Release: JP: April 16, 1998
- Genre: Action role-playing
- Mode: Single-player

Brave Prove (ブレイヴ・プローヴ) is a 1998 Japanese video game for the PlayStation. It was developed by Data West Corporation, and directed by Noburo Nishizawa.

It is a 2D action role-playing game with real time combat and top-down perspective. At the time of release only got mediocre reviews, with most saying the game is too derivative of other action RPGs from the past. The game has never been released outside of Japan. A complete English fan translation was released in January 2020.

== Story ==
The hero of the story goes on a quest to regain the love of a girl named Sheena.

== Gameplay ==
Brave Prove is a two-dimensional action role-playing game with real time combat. Dashing in the game requires the use of double tapping the d-pad. Attacks in the game have a simple three hit combo, but incorporating inputs can result in more moves. Elemental magic can also be found in the game, and the player executes those via button inputs and directional inputs. Attacks can be chained together and combined, for up to 400 unique combinations.

The game incorporates simple puzzle mechanics into the game, such as pushing blocks or extinguishing fire torches to open doors. Various settings in the game include forests, labyrinths, and mountain passes. Using bombs on cracked walls can expose secret new areas or secret rooms to explore.

== Development and release ==
The game was developed by Data West and directed by Noboru Nishizawa who also is credited as the main programmer and one of the planners for the game. Data West created a series of games in the 1980s and 1990s in many genres, including shooting games, rail shooters, visual novel adventure games. Characters have only two or three frames of animation for attacks. The game features entirely 2D graphics, including portraits, sprites, and backgrounds, when most games on the PlayStation were using 3D graphics.

Brave Prove was released in Japan for the Sony PlayStation on April 16, 1998, and was published by Data West Corporation. The game has never been released outside of Japan, nor has it been re-released; however, in 2019 it received a fan translation into English.

== Reception ==
Reception

Review scores
Publication	Score
Famitsu	20/40
Gamers' Republic	C
Consoles +	86/100

Weekly Famitsu gave the game a score of 20 out of 40. Reviewers remarked that it is a particularly orthodox action role-playing game. Mike Griffon writing in Gamers' Republic magazine, gave the game a score of C. He was critical of the music being "generic", and the graphics as looking like something that could have appeared on the Super NES. He said the gameplay is similar to previous games while not improving on the genre. He says the game borrows heavily from such games as Alundra, Legend of Oasis, Ys, and Zelda. However, he recommends playing Alundra or Legend of Oasis as they're better games.

GameFan writer Eggo was more positive of the game. He praised the 2D graphics, saying they are a welcome relief from the majority of new games being 3D, while saying the music was fine, but not too remarkable. He was only critical of needing to double tap to run in the game, saying it can lead to sore fingers, and that the game should have had a dedicated run button. He praised the long dungeons, and long length of the game, but said the dungeons are easy to get lost in. He said the game would be worth checking out if it was ever localized.
