= Metal & Lace: The Battle of the Robo Babes =

- Developer: Forest
- Publishers: JP: Forest; NA: Megatech Software
- Designer: Hideki Masuko
- Programmers: Hideki Masuko; Kazuhiro Otawara
- Artists: Akihiro Yoshizane; Naoki Osaki; Takako Suzuki
- Writer: David Moskowitz (American version)
- Composers: Koichi Yamada; Yoshifumi Doiichi
- Platforms: FM Towns, MS-DOS, PC-98
- Release: JP: May 29, 1992 (PC-98); JP: October 1993 (FM Towns); NA: 1993 (MS-DOS)
- Genres: Fighting, eroge
- Modes: Single-player, multiplayer

Metal & Lace: The Battle of the Robo Babes is a 1993 fighting game published by Megatech Software in North America for the MS-DOS. Set in the year 2053 and featuring an all-female cast of seven "MeCha" robots, the players participate on a "RoboFighting" tournament at MeCha island. The gameplay consists of one-on-one fights using a main two-button configuration and features special moves.

Metal & Lace: Battle of the Robo Babes is a localization of Ningyou Tsukai (Note: Japanese: 人形使い, Hepburn: Ningyō Tsukai; lit. "Puppeteer" or "Puppet Operator"), which was published earlier by eroge developer Forest for PC-98 (1992) and FM Towns (1993). The title was then licensed for the North American market by Megatech Software and released for MS-DOS in 1993. Megatech expanded upon the game's concept during localization, introducing upgrade items, a different plot and English voicework.

Metal & Lace has garnered mixed reception from critics, most of whom reviewed it as an import title: they felt that its use of erotism was disappointing and criticized its high difficulty, while most reviewers were divided in regards to the audiovisual presentation, controls and gameplay. It was later followed by a Japan-exclusive sequel titled Ningyou Tsukai 2 (Note: Japanese: 人形使い2, Hepburn: Ningyō Tsukai Tsu; lit. "Puppeteer 2" or "Puppet Operator 2"), which was first released for PC-98 (1996) and later for Windows (1997).

== Gameplay ==
MS-DOS version screenshot.

Metal & Lace: The Battle of the Robo Babes is an arcade-style all-female eroge fighting game reminiscent of Street Fighter II using a two-button layout. The plot varies between each region. In the original Japanese version, humanity began migrating to another planet due to significant development of industrial remote-controlled robots called "Si-lhouette". They were eventually used for martial arts competitions and duels, gaining popularity and causing their technology to grow rapidly. Mizuho Factory, was a company dedicated to the manufacturing of Si-lhouette machines but its parent company went bankrupt before a new model was launched due to a large debt. Rika Mizuho decides to participate with a Si-lhouette machine she created called Mimi after hearing news of a competition where the winner will receive a cash prize. In the North American localization, players assume the role of an aspiring enthusiast commanding a RoboFighter participating in a RoboFighting tournament taking place at MeCha island, where warriors known as MeCha rely on armor suits that provides several benefits.

Prior to starting a match, the player must pay an entry fee in order to participate. The player fights against other opponents in one-on-one matches and the fighter who manages to deplete the health bar of the opponent wins the first bout. The first to win two bouts becomes the winner of the match. Each round is timed; if both fighters still have health remaining when time expires, the fighter with more health wins the round. It features two modes: single-player battles and versus. In single-player mode, players fight against seven girls representing a computer-controlled fighters and as each are defeated, an image of each girl is rewarded in an increasingly revealing state of undress. If all of the opponents are defeated, the player will be able to fight against the "Ultimate Champions". Characters available in the game are Mimi, Rogue, Mistress, Anna, Sky Hound, Sun C and Silver Dragon. Special moves are performed by entering button commands while pressing the d-pad.

Unlike other fighting games of the era, the player's health bar is not replenished between fights, requiring the purchase of energy batteries by visiting a parts shop where other items can be bought to increase offensive and defensive power levels with money earned from bouts. Players can also buy different armor sets via an armor shop, each with their own advantages and disadvantages, and each one becomes stronger by repeatedly using the same armor during matches.

== Development and release ==
Metal & Lace: The Battle of the Robo Babes was first published in Japan by eroge developer Forest for PC-98 under the title Ningyou Tsukai on May 29, 1992, and later for FM Towns in October 1993. The game was originally programmed and designed by Hideki Masuko. Akihiro Yoshizane, Naoki Osaki and Takako Suzuki, who worked in the Japanese anime industry, as well as two artists credited under the pseudonyms "Ikuko" and "Yoko" were responsible for the creation of characters, animations and backgrounds. The soundtrack was scored by co-composer Koichi Yamada and Yoshifumi Doiichi.

Metal & Lace was then licensed for the North American market by Megatech Software and released for MS-DOS in 1993. This version was also distributed in Europe by Screen Multimedia via import. Megatech designers David S. Moskowitz, Erwin Mab and Kenny Wu expanded upon the game's concept during its localization by introducing elements such as upgrade items, a new plot and English voice acting. The DOS localization was published in both disk and CD-ROM format under two releases: an under 13 version lacking nudity and an over 18 version featuring partial nudity only available via mail order.

== Reception ==
Reception

Review scores
Publication	Score
Aktueller Software Markt	9/12
Génération 4	57%
Joystick	27%
Micromanía	83/100
PC Zone	35/100
Pelit	82/100
PC Joker	62%
PC Player	46/100
Power Play	12%
Power Unlimited	85/100

Metal & Lace: The Battle of the Robo Babes was met with mixed reception from critics since its release, most of which reviewed it as an import title. French magazine Génération 4 regarded Metal & Lace as a disappointing and dull fighting game that uses erotic imagery as pretext, criticizing its difficulty, sprite animations and repetitive fights, stating that Cobra Mission was more fun to play. Joystick's Vincent Solé called the game to be a "pale copy" of Street Fighter II and panned its poor color palette, controls, action and jerky sprite animations but commended the manga-style graphics and CD-quality voice work in the CD-ROM version. PC Player's Anatol Locker felt that the title was mediocre outside of its presentation and graphical "frills", criticizing the difficulty at higher matches and recommended playing Body Blows instead but gave positive remarks to the extras and ability to customize the fighter for adding tactics into gameplay. Dutch publication Power Unlimited gave it a more positive outlook, praising the anime-style visuals that started to become popular at the time of the game's release. Aktueller Software Markt's Michael Suck praised its elaborate animations, atmospheric background graphics, sound and action.

In contrast, Computer Gaming World's Charles Ardai panned Metal & Lace: The Battle of the Robo Babes for its length, combat system, lack of additional customizable items and backgrounds, sluggish controls and repeatability, stating that the core gameplay is not good. Micromanía's Óscar Santos García commended the visuals, addictive gameplay, sound and character animations. However, Santos García felt mixed in regards to its originality and the high difficulty was criticized. In a similar manner, Pelit's Jyrki J.J. Kasvi gave Metal & Lace a positive outlook but criticized the lack of in-game music. PC Joker's Joachim Nettelbeck thought that the controls worked well and gave positive remarks to the sprite animations and fight sequences, though he felt mixed about the presentation and criticized the poor backgrounds. Power Play's Michael Hengst found the action to be dull, criticizing the audiovisual presentation and erotism. PC Zone's Chris Anderson summarized that the game was completely "devoid of any entertainment value whatsoever." Anderson criticized the gameplay for being boring and the erotic elements to be disappointing.

James V. Trunzo reviewed Metal & Lace: The Battle of the Robo Babes in White Wolf #42 (April, 1994), giving it a final evaluation of "Good" and stated that "The Battle of the Robo Babes isn't for everyone. Liberal thinkers might be offended by the implied sexual rewards of victory and by its dehumanization of women. You also need to enjoy games that require a high degree of hand-eye coordination [...] If you're of the Street Fighter, Ninja Warriors, Double Dragon ilk and like a little flash of flesh, Metal & Lace offers everything you want."
