= Aguri Suzuki F-1 Super Driving =

1992 video game

- Super Famicom Japanese box art
- Developer: Genki
- Publishers: JP: LOZC G. Amusements; EU: Altron; NA: Absolute Entertainment
- Designer: Tomoharu Kimura
- Composers: Katsuhiro Hayashi (Super NES); Motoaki Takenouchi (Game Boy)
- Platforms: Super NES, Game Boy
- Release: Super NES: JP: July 14, 1992; NA: September 1993; EU: 1993; Game Boy: JP: May 28, 1993
- Genre: Sim racing
- Modes: Single-player, multiplayer

Aguri Suzuki F-1 Super Driving, (Note: 鈴木亜久里のＦ１スーパードライビング (Suzuki Aguri no F-1 Super Driving) in Japan) released as Redline F-1 Racer in North America, is a Formula One racing simulator game for the Super Nintendo Entertainment System and Game Boy. The game is named after and sponsored by the Japanese Formula 1 driver, Aguri Suzuki; his likeness and imagery were retained in the North American version despite the name change.

== Summary ==
Gameplay from the game's two-player mode.

Everything from treacherous right turns to gasoline is simulated as the player tries to win the FIA World Drivers' and Constructors' Championships. The player can play a single race (non-championship Formula One race) or a season mode where the winner takes all, and the losers can wait until next year. This game is based on the 1992 Formula One season. The player's default role is a driver on the Footwork Racing team (Aguri Suzuki's old team), though they can choose to race with pastiches of five other teams, namely McLaren, Ferrari, Williams, Benetton and Jordan (the latter two uses their 1991 liveries).

Players are given the ability to customize their racing vehicle; transforming them into the pit crew in addition to the driver himself. Suspension, wings, and brakes among other things can be altered to gain lap times in addition to positions on the track. Winning is near impossible unless the player can successfully tinker with his vehicle from the beginning of the race week. Even the weather can betray the player; having the wrong tires will make the car skid out. Aguri Suzuki appears in the game as the most expert driver.

The graphics in the Super NES/Famicom version use mode 7 graphics similar to Super Mario Kart and F-Zero. In 1993, Aguri Suzuki F-1 Super Driving was released for the Game Boy handheld, exclusively in Japan. In this game, the player can control a kart and a Formula One car.

The PAL version of the game is considered to be quite rare.

== Reception ==
Electronic Games scored the game 83%, with Arnie Katz calling it a "deep Formula One sim".
