= Motoaki Takenouchi =

Japanese composer (born 1967)

- 武内 基朗
- Born: July 8, 1967 (age 59); Saitama Prefecture, Japan
- Other name: dj take
- Education: Tokyo University of the Arts
- Occupations: Composer; arranger; keyboardist
- Years active: 1990–2014
- Musical career
- Genres: Progressive rock; symphonic rock; video game music
- Instrument: Keyboards
- Website: taketake.cc/piano/

Motoaki Takenouchi (武内 基朗, Takenouchi Motoaki; born July 8, 1967) is a Japanese composer, most recognized for his video game soundtracks during the 1990s, particularly for the Shining series of games. He has worked for companies such as Sega, Enix, Climax Entertainment, and Game Arts. Takenouchi studied music at the Tokyo University of the Arts, where he and fellow composer Hayato Matsuo were classmates. Around this time, he was involved with several projects, including arrangement under the supervision of Koichi Sugiyama.

Takenouchi's compositional approach often encompasses elements of progressive rock, jazz fusion, and symphonic, frequently making use of odd time signatures, virtuosic musical lines, syncopation and dissonance. He cited King Crimson, Yes, Frank Zappa, and Emerson, Lake & Palmer as some of his influences. In addition to his work on video game soundtracks, Takenouchi also composed music for some of the early releases on Shinji Hosoe's Troubadour record label. In 2000, he composed and arranged the song "Shower" for Rina Chinen. He also plays keyboards for "Autumn-River Willow" under the pseudonym of "dj".

== Works ==
Video games scored by Motoaki Takenouchi
Year	Title	Role
1991	Dragon Quest: The Adventure of Dai	Anime; arrangements with Hayato Matsuo
1991	Jewel Master	Music
1992	Double Moon Densetsu	Music
1992	Landstalker	Music
1992	E.V.O.: Search for Eden	Arrangements
1992	Shining Force Gaiden	Music
1992	Air Combat II: Special	Music
1993	Aguri Suzuki F-1 Super Driving	Music; Game Boy version
1993	Shining Force: The Sword of Hajya	Music
1993	Shining Force II	Music
1994	Shining Force CD	Music
1995	Granhistoria: Genshi Sekaiki	Music
1995	Shining Force Gaiden: Final Conflict	Music
1995	Shining Wisdom	Music
1996	Gungriffon	Music
1996	SD Gundam: Over Galaxian	Music with Norimasa Yamanaka
