= Download (video game) =

1990 video game

Down Load
- Developer: Alfa System
- Publisher: NEC Avenue
- Producers: Makoto Sakio; Toshio Tabeta
- Artist: Masaomi Kanzaki
- Writers: Ken Ohmori; Wataru Nakajima
- Composer: Yasuhiko Fukuda
- Platform: PC Engine
- Release: JP: June 22, 1990
- Genre: Scrolling shooter
- Mode: Single-player

Down Load (Note: Japanese: ダウンロード, Hepburn: Daun Rōdo) is a 1990 horizontally scrolling shooter published by NEC Avenue for the PC Engine. It was followed by Download 2 and also inspired an anime OVA.

== Gameplay ==
Gameplay screenshot

Down Load is a horizontally scrolling shooter.

== Development and release ==
While most text in the game is in Japanese, it includes infamous examples of "Engrish".

== Reception ==
Reception

Review scores
Publication	Score
Aktueller Software Markt	9/12
Computer and Video Games	83%, 85%
Famitsu	5/10, 7/10, 7/10, 6/10
Gekkan PC Engine	70/100, 85/100, 75/100, 75/100, 85/100
Joystick	82%
Marukatsu PC Engine	8/10, 7/10, 7/10, 7/10
Player One	84%
Tilt	16/20
Amstar	16/20
Famicom Hisshoubon	3/5
Power Play	67%

Down Load was met with generally favorable reviews. The Japanese publication Micom BASIC Magazine ranked the game sixteenth in popularity in its November 1990 issue, and it received a score of 21.88 out of 30 in a 1993 readers' poll conducted by PC Engine Fan, ranking among PC Engine titles at the number 175 spot.
