= Download 2 =

1991 video game

Down Load 2
- Developer: Alfa System
- Publisher: NEC Avenue
- Director: Akihiro Saito
- Producers: Makoto Sakio; Toshio Tabeta
- Artist: Shuho Itahashi
- Writer: Wataru Nakajima
- Composers: Kimitaka Matsumae; Suguru Yamaguchi; Tadashi Kitamura
- Platform: PC Engine CD-ROM²
- Release: JP: March 29, 1991
- Genre: Horizontal-scrolling shooter
- Mode: Single-player

Download 2 (Note: Japanese: ダウンロード2, Hepburn: Daunrōdo Tsu) is a side-scrolling 1991 shoot 'em up video game published by NEC Avenue for the PC Engine CD-ROM². It is the sequel of Download and also inspired an anime OVA.

== Gameplay ==
Gameplay screenshot

Down Load 2 is a side-scrolling shoot 'em up game.

== Development and release ==
Down Load 2 was developed by Alfa System and published by NEC Avenue.

== Reception ==
Reception

Review scores
Publication	Score
Famitsu	7/10, 7/10, 8/10, 7/10
Gekkan PC Engine	70/100, 80/100, 70/100, 80/100, 75/100
Génération 4	91%
Joystick	92%
Marukatsu PC Engine	8/10, 7/10, 7/10, 7/10
Computer+Videogiochi	95%
Game Boy	3/5, 3/5, 3/5, 4/5
Hippon Super!	5/10

Down Load 2 was met with generally favorable reviews. The Japanese publication Micom BASIC Magazine ranked the game seventh in popularity in its June 1991 issue.
