= Jewel Master =

1991 video game

- North American box art
- Developer: Sega
- Publisher: Sega
- Composer: Motoaki Takenouchi
- Platform: Sega Genesis
- Release: JP: August 30, 1991; EU: November 21, 1991; NA: 1991
- Genre: Action-adventure
- Mode: Single-player

Jewel Master (Note: Japanese: ジュエル・マスター, Hepburn: Jueru Masutā) is a 1991 action-adventure game developed and published by Sega for the Genesis. It follows a mage who can cast spells using elemental rings as they attempt to thwart the conquest of a demonic king. The player traverses five side-scrolling levels with the aid of their rings to progress through platforming challenges and to defeat enemies and bosses.

The game originally began development by Amusement on the Japanese X68000 computer under the title Blade of the Great Elements, but due to complicated circumstances the game shifted its focus to the Sega Genesis and as a result certain things were changed about the game. The game was composed by Motoaki Takenouchi.

Jewel Master received mixed reviews from critics, who praised the unique elemental ring mechanics, visuals and sound but criticized the gameplay as it was deemed repetitive and uninteresting.

== Gameplay ==
Gameplay Examples

The ring selection screen allows the player to change their rings used and what button they are assigned to. Over the course of the game, more rings are added to the players arsenal.

Rings are all assigned either the fire, water, wind or earth elemental trait, which can be used against certain enemies to gain the upperhand. For example, in this screenshot, the Jewel Master attacks a plant-like enemy with fire magic in Stage 1

Jewel Master is an action-adventure game in which the player traverses side-scrolling levels with the aid of elemental rings. Its plot starts when a demonic king begins to conquer a large portion of a kingdom with his armies. This eventually leads to an unnamed mage going on a journey to destroy them with the combined strength of his rings. There are four types of elemental rings which each correspond to either fire, water, wind or earth magic. The rings are equipables that offer special effects and can be switched around at any point in the game. The effects can be assigned to one of two buttons, represented by two hands in-game. Depending on the rings equipped and where they are assigned, the effect that happens when the buttons are pushed changes. Most effects initiate different kinds of attacks but others can change how the Jewel Master traverses the stage. For example, a wind magic ring can be equipped to allow the Jewel Master to double jump. Some attacks can be more or less effective at defeating enemies.

There are a total of five stages that must be traversed. In stages, there are a variety of enemies that must be avoided or defeated in order to progress. Alongside regular enemies, bosses and mini-bosses are encountered throughout the stages and once defeated give the Jewel Master a new ring to use. Occasionally, minor platforming challenges present themselves which requires the player to either jump or use one of the traversable ring effects to continue.

== Development ==
Jewel Master originally began development by Amusement for the Japanese exclusive Sharp X68000 home computer under the title Blade of the Great Elements. Blade of the Great Elements had a different story and some gameplay differences compared to Jewel Master. The player character being able to use elemental magic rings however was implemented in the early stages of development as seen in early prototype versions of the game. Through a complex series of events, Blade of the Great Elements ceased development for the X68000 and was released on the Sega Genesis as Jewel Master.

Motoaki Takenouchi composed the music for Jewel Master with a strong influence from progressive rock. Some of the track names (as seen in the sound test), such as "The Gate of Delirium", "Burning Bridges" and "Talk to the Wind", seem to pay homage to various progressive rock bands from the late 1960s and early 1970s such as Pink Floyd.

== Reception ==
Reception

Review score
Publication	Score
IGN	6/10

Sega Pro magazine gave Jewel Master an overall score of 88/100 praising the detailed graphics, sound, gameplay and stating “Despite the repetitive gameplay, it does manage to continually impressive with graphics and sound making you play and play”.

MegaTech gave an overall score of 55 out of 100 noting the game being a fairly standard platform game citing a few original features concluding "Has neither the challenge or addiction to keep you entertained for more than a few sessions."
