= Twin Hawk =

1989 video game

- Arcade flyer
- Developer: Toaplan
- Publisher: Taito
- Designer: Yuichirō Nozawa
- Artists: Sanae Nitō; Yuko Tataka
- Composer: Osamu Ōta
- Platforms: Arcade, PC Engine, PC Engine CD-ROM², Sega Mega Drive
- Release: June 1989: Arcade; WW: June 1989 Mega Drive; JP: 23 June 1990; EU: 1990 PC Engine; JP: 14 December 1990 PC Engine CD-ROM²; JP: 26 July 1991
- Genre: Vertically scrolling shooter
- Modes: Single-player, multiplayer
- Arcade system: Taito X System

Twin Hawk (Note: Also known as Daisenpu (Japanese: 大旋風(だいせんぷう), Hepburn: Daisenpū; lit. "Great Whirlwind") in Japan.) is a 1989 vertically scrolling shooter video game developed by Toaplan and published by Taito for arcades. Taking place at the end of an alternative World War II setting, where general Giovanni and his army plots to take over the fictional country Gorongo, players assume the role of a wing commander from the Daisenpū squadron taking control of a Flying Fortress fighter aircraft (known as the A6M Zero) in an effort to overthrow the enemy.

Created by Yuichirō Nozawa, Twin Hawk was developed as a commission for Taito by most of the same team that previously worked on several projects at Toaplan and made use of the former's Taito X System board. The game was later ported to consoles including the Sega Mega Drive, PC Engine and PC Engine CD-ROM², with each one featuring several changes and additions compared to the original version.

The rights to the title are currently owned by Tatsujin, a Japanese company formed by former Toaplan member Masahiro Yuge.

== Gameplay ==
Arcade version screenshot

Twin Hawk is a military-themed vertically scrolling shoot 'em up game reminiscent of Flying Shark, in which players assume the role of a wing commander from the Daisenpū squadron taking control of a Flying Fortress fighter aircraft (known as the A6M Zero Fighter) through multiple levels to defeat an assortment of military enemy forces like tanks, battleships, and artillery to overthrow general Giovanni and his army as the main objective. Like Tiger-Heli, there are no flying enemies in the game. The title initially appears to be a standard vertical scrolling shooter, with players controlling their craft over a constantly scrolling background and the scenery never stops moving. Enemies are shot down using the main shot that travels a max distance of the screen's height. Common to Toaplan arcade titles, there are various differences between the Japanese and western versions, such as Twin Hawk versions containing co-operative play.

A unique gameplay feature is the bomb mechanic in the form of a group of friendly planes; pressing the bomb button will call in six Flying Fortresses to surround and protect the player's plane and provide back-up fire. After taking enemy fire, the friendly planes perform a kamikaze attack against nearest enemies below but players can also lead them to perform kamikaze as well by pressing the bomb button once all planes are already in formation. Double tapping the bomb button activates a bomb capable of obliterating any enemy caught within its blast radius. There are also various types of items scattered through every level: "P" icons to upgrade the player's main gun, extra helper/bomb stocks and 1UPs.

Depending on the settings in the arcade version, the title uses either a checkpoint system in which a downed single player will start off at the beginning of the checkpoint they managed to reach before dying, or a respawn system where their ship immediately starts at the location they died at. Getting hit by enemy fire results in losing a live, as well as a penalty of decreasing the ship's firepower and once all lives are lost, the game is over unless the players insert more credits into the arcade machine to continue playing. The game loops back to the first level after completing the last one as with previous titles from Toaplan, with each one increasing the difficulty and enemies fire denser bullet patterns.

== Synopsis ==
The plot summary of Twin Hawk varies between each region and version. At the end of an alternate World War II, a new European country is formed called Gorongo. General Giovanni of the Gorongo military was infuriated with the results of the war and what it meant to the country of Gorongo, initiating a rebellion against the country's government that was widely followed by his soldiers. Holing themselves up on Bobo Island, south of Gorongo, Giovanni declared the occupation as the independent state of Fuangania and plotted to take over Gorongo. After taking over the town of Kusunoki, the Fuangania invasion – consisting of massive ground and sea attack forces – started to spread. Gorongo President Bratt ordered a counterattack that focused on the one type of firepower Giovanni lacked: an air force. The special air force "Daisenpū" sets up a mountain base after spotting a secret Fuangania fortress under construction. Nearing the end of their training, however, the airforce is spotted by the Fuangania and are preparing to attack. It is up to the player, in the role of a wing commander, to fly into Giovanni's secret base and take him and his commanding unit out.

== Development and release ==
Most of the artwork were hand-drawn sketches created by the development team before being transpose to pixel art graphics.

Twin Hawk was created as a commission for Taito by most of the same team that worked on previous projects at Toaplan and made use of the former's Taito X System board. Yuichirō Nozawa, who until then had not been working exclusively on shoot 'em up titles, served as its game designer. Both Sanae Nitō and Yuko Tataka also acted as designers in the development cycle. Osamu "Lee" Ōta scored the soundtrack, becoming his sole work as composer for a shoot 'em up title. The game was released by Taito in Japanese and European arcades in June 1989. An album containing its audio, as well as from other Toaplan titles was published exclusively in Japan by City Connection under their Clarice Disk label in August 2018. It was also featured on a Japanese TV show, with Pokémon creator Satoshi Tajiri reviewing the arcade version.

Twin Hawk was ported a year later in-house by the same staff from the original arcade release and was published by Sega to the Sega Mega Drive in Japan on 23 June 1990, and in Europe the same year. The Mega Drive port stays faithful to the original arcade release but has a number of key differences such as having a smaller color palette that lead to sprites being recolored in different ways, along with other presentation and gameplay changes from the original version. Tataka stated that working with the Mega Drive proved to be difficult due to several restrictions imposed by the hardware.

Twin Hawk was later ported by Center Tech and published by NEC Avenue to the PC Engine exclusively in Japan on 14 December of the same year after the Mega Drive version. On 26 July 1991, an enhanced re-issue of the PC Engine version for the PC Engine CD-ROM² titled Daisenpu Custom (Note: 大旋風 カスタム (Daisenpū Custom)) was released, which is similar to the previous PC Engine version with the added benefit of arranged CD-DA soundtrack and additional stages and enemies. There are changes between the card and CD versions however, such as levels now being broken into areas instead of being continuous.

== Reception ==
Reception
Review scores
Publication	Scores			
Publication	ARC	SMD	PCE	PCE CD-ROM²
ACE	—N/a	715 / 1000	—N/a	—N/a
ASM	—N/a	6 / 12	—N/a	—N/a
Beep! Mega Drive	—N/a	30 / 40	—N/a	—N/a
CVG MM	—N/a	71%	—N/a	—N/a
Consoles +	—N/a	—N/a	—N/a	76%
Famitsu	—N/a	30 / 40	23 / 40	25 / 40
TGM	—N/a	60%	—N/a	—N/a
Gekkan PC Engine	—N/a	—N/a	74 / 100	74 / 100
Génération 4	—N/a	—N/a	79%	—N/a
Joystick	—N/a	71% 53%	61% 46%	—N/a
Marukatsu PC Engine	—N/a	—N/a	27 / 40	—N/a
MDAG	—N/a	56% 41%	—N/a	—N/a
Mega Drive Fan	—N/a	16.85 / 30	—N/a	—N/a
MegaTech	—N/a	71% 60%	—N/a	—N/a
Micromanía	—N/a	7 / 10	—N/a	—N/a
PC Engine Fan	—N/a	—N/a	20.39 / 30	19.43 / 30
Power Play	—N/a	45%	45%	—N/a
Raze	—N/a	87%	79%	—N/a
Sega Power	—N/a	60% 3/5; 3/5	—N/a	—N/a
Sega Pro	—N/a	64 / 100	—N/a	—N/a
Tilt	—N/a	14 / 20	13 / 20	—N/a
Your Sinclair	70° / 100°	—N/a	—N/a	—N/a
Zero	1/5	—N/a	—N/a	—N/a
Awards
Publication(s)			Award(s)	
Gamest Mook (1989)			Annual Hit Game 40th (Arcade)	

In Japan, Game Machine listed Twin Hawk on their August 1, 1989 issue as being the seventh most-successful table arcade unit of the month, outperforming titles such as Flipull and Golden Axe. On release, Famitsu scored the Mega Drive version of the game a 30 out of 40.

== Legacy ==
In more recent years, the rights to the game and many other IPs from Toaplan are now owned by Tatsujin, a company named after its Japanese title that was founded in 2017 by Masahiro Yuge and is part of Embracer Group since 2022.
