= NEC Avenue =

Japanese music and video game publisher

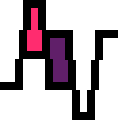
- Company type: Division
- Industry: Music, Video games
- Founded: 1987
- Defunct: January 29, 1999
- Fate: Dissolved
- Headquarters: Chiyoda-ku, Tokyo, Japan; Takatsu-ku, Kawasaki, Japan
- Number of employees: 50 (1994)
- Parent: NEC

NEC Avenue, Ltd. (NECアベニュー株式会社, NEC Abenyū Kabushiki-gaisha) was a Japanese music and video game publisher part of NEC.

== History ==
NEC Avenue was founded in 1987 as a record label within NEC. NEC Avenue eventually got involved with video games, and secured licenses to produce console versions of arcade titles from Sega and Taito. Toshio Tabeta, the employee responsible for the Sega deal, would later learn that the Sega employee that gave NEC Avenue permission to make arcade ports was scolded. Video game records represented about 10% of NEC Avenue's business in 1994. In October 1995, its game division was spun-off into a new NEC subsidiary named NEC Interchannel. NEC Interchannel took over NEC Avenue's music and game operations in October 1997, then acquired its music subsidiary, NEC Avenue Music Publishing (NECアベニュー音楽出版, NEC Abenyū Ongaku Shuppan), in March 1998. NEC Avenue was dissolved on January 29, 1999, and NEC Avenue Music Publishing became IC Avenue Music Publishing after Interchannel split from NEC in 2004.

== Artists ==
- DOME
- Joe Hisaishi
- Junko Yagami
- Katsuhiko Nakagawa
- Monday Michiru
- Nobukazu Takemura
- Shinji Harada
- Takako Ōta

== Video games ==
The publishing rights of all NEC Avenue titles across the HE System family have been owned by M2 since July 2023.

PC Engine

- Space Harrier (1988)
- Fantasy Zone (1988)
- SonSon II (1989)
- Hyper Dyne Side Arms (1989)
- F-1 Dream (1989)
- Jūōki (1989)
- Download (1990)
- Operation Wolf (1990)
- Darius Plus (1990)
- After Burner II (1990)
- Thunder Blade (1990)
- Daisenpū (1990)
- Out Run (1990)
- Darius Alpha (1990)
- Morita Shogi PC (1991)

PC Engine SuperGrafx

- Dai Makaimura (1990)

CD-ROM²

- Jūōki (1989)
- Hyper Dyne Side Arms Special (1989)
- Super Darius (1990)
- ROM² Karaoke Vol. 1 (1990)
- ROM² Karaoke Vol. 2 (1990)
- ROM² Karaoke Vol. 3 (1990)
- ROM² Karaoke Vol. 4 (1990)
- ROM² Karaoke Vol. 5 (1990)
- Quiz Avenue (1991)
- Download 2 (1991)
- Hellfire S (1991)
- Splash Lake (1991)
- Daisenpū Custom (1991)
- Quiz Avenue II (1991)
- Might & Magic (1992)
- Rainbow Islands (1993)
- Space Fantasy Zone (Canceled)

Super CD-ROM²

- Forgotten Worlds (1992)
- Bonanza Bros. (1992)
- Dragon Knight II (1992)
- Gain Ground SX (1992)
- Horror Story (1993)
- CAL II (1993)
- Sotsugyou: Graduation (1993)
- Mahjong on the Beach (1993)
- Super Darius II (1993)
- CAL III: Kanketsuhen (1994)
- Monster Maker: Yami no Ryuukishi (1994)
- Puyo Puyo CD (1994)
- Tenchi wo Kurau (1994)
- Chiki Chiki Boys (1994)
- Dragon Knight III (1994)
- Tanjou Debut (1994)
- Basted (1994)
- Quiz Avenue III (1994)
- Ane-San (1995)
- Dragon Knight & Graffiti (1995)
- Tenchi Muyō! Ryōōki (1995)
- Renny Blaster (1995)
- Asuka 120% Maxima (1995)
- Space Invaders: The Original Game (1995)
- Dōkyūsei (1995)

Arcade CD-ROM²

- Strider Hiryū (1994)
- Madō Monogatari: Honō no Sotsuenji (1996)

PC-98

- Tanjou Debut (1993)
- Mercurius Pretty (1994)

PC-FX

- Dōkyūsei 2 (1996)
- Dragon Knight 4 (1997)
