= Megatech Software =

Video game licensing company

- Type: Private (defunct)
- Industry: Video games
- Founded: Kenny Wu
- Headquarters: California

Megatech Software was the first licensor of anime games in the United States, and the first licensor of hentai games or eroge in English.

== History ==
Very little is known about Megatech as a company. They were founded prior to 1992. The first three games published were anime themed adult games. Their first release Cobra Mission: Panic in Cobra City was self-rated NR-18 (a rating indicating the presence of nudity and sexual content), the second two were NR-13 with the option of purchasing an upgrade to NR-18, and the last was self-rated as acceptable for all ages. All were made for MS-DOS. Upgrades were purchased separately and came in the form of 3.5” floppy disks that were installed separately. The games had some voice acting starting with Cobra Mission:Panic in Cobra City which was limited to moans from the female characters in the game. Metal & Lace had a wider range of voice acting, however, again it was limited to single sentences said by the female characters. Knights of Xentar used CD-ROM technology to have a wide array of voice acting including complete voices during all cut scenes by both male and female characters.

They appeared at Anime Expo 1993 promoting two of their new games.

Megatech folded sometime in between 1997 and 1999. Its last published game was Power Dolls in 1995.

== Restarted company ==
Megatech has restarted their company under the company called Megatech Games. They are developing games for iPhones, iPods, iPads and all other iTunes App Store related products. Their first game after their comeback is named Undercover: Girls of Cobra Mission, which is a line drawing puzzle game. The objective of which is to uncover as much of the screen as you can by boxing sections of the screens to reveal the Anime graphics underneath. Players will need to uncover a minimum of 80% of the screen to win the level before advancing to the next. This free demo contains 6 levels featuring the anime girls from Megatech's Cobra Mission game released in the 1993. The app is released under the company Megatech & Design Inc.

== Games released ==
- 1992: Cobra Mission: Panic in Cobra City
- 1993: Metal & Lace: The Battle of the Robo Babes
- 1994: Knights of Xentar
- 1995: Power Dolls
- 2010: Undercover: Girls of Cobra Mission
