= Soul & Sword =

1993 video game

- Cover art
- Developer: Pandora Box
- Publisher: Zamuse
- Platform: Super Famicom
- Release: JP: November 26, 1993
- Genre: Role-playing game
- Mode: Single-player

Soul & Sword (ソウル アンド ソード) is a 1993 Japanese-only video game on Super Famicom developed by Pandora Box. It is a prequel to Traverse: Starlight & Prairie.

== Summary ==
Being a non-linear role-playing game, the quests can be done in any order although some of them have prerequisites. Most are completely optional, but change the ending. The quests can be abandoned and returned at will.

The game features a time system and the characters are actually aging, though their statistics stay the same. This system is also used for money loans, as you will receive penalties when you don't pay back before the end of the year.

== Reception ==
Soul & Sword received reviews of 8/10, 6/10, 7/10 and 7/10 in Famitsu. Famitsu reviewers praised the non-linear structure of the game but found the combat system to be conventional.
