= Download (OVA) =

1992 anime OVA

- DOWN LOAD 南無阿弥陀仏は愛の詩; Download: Namu Amida Butsu wa Ai no Uta
- Directed by: Rintaro
- Screenplay by: Rintaro; Yoshiyuki Suga
- Character designer: Yoshinori Kanada

Production
- Art director: Hidetoshi Kaneko
- Sound director: Masafumi Mima
- Cinematographer: Hitoshi Yamaguchi
- Color designer: Yukiko Nagahama
- Editors: Yukiko Itou; Harutoshi Ogata; Fumihiro Sueyoshi
- Studio: Madhouse
- Producers: Masao Maruyama; Tsuenro Seto; Toshio Tabeta; Hisaya Takabayashi
- Production companies: NEC Avenue; Sofix

Original release
- Release: December 18, 1992

Download: Namu Amida Butsu wa Ai no Uta, (Note: Japanese: ダウンロード 南無阿弥陀仏は愛の詩, Hepburn: Daunrōdo Namu Amida Butsu wa Ai no Uta) also known as Download: Devil's Circuit and Download: Song in Loving Homage to Amida Buddha, is a direct-to-video anime inspired by the NEC PC Engine games Download and Download 2.

== Staff ==
Besides including themes that inspired psychological studies, such as brain–computer interfaces, the OVA is notable for its production staff, which included Rintaro and Yoshinori Kanada, two of the most acclaimed animators in anime history, and Hiroshi "Monsieur" Kamayatsu, a member of the popular 1960s band The Spiders and later a successful solo artist.

== Reception ==
Hardcore Gaming 101 observed apparent influences from Akira and Megazone 23. It highlighted that the title introduces Japanese Buddhist themes to the franchise, but criticized the fact that the length of the animation is not long enough to develop its plot.
