= Splash Lake =

1991 video game

- Splash Lake Turbografx CD retail release
- Developer: Bits Laboratory
- Publisher: NEC Avenue
- Platforms: PC Engine; TurboGrafx-16
- Genre: Puzzle
- Mode: Single-player

Splash Lake is an action puzzle strategy game developed by Bits Laboratory and published by NEC Avenue for the PC Engine in 1991. Later the game was ported to the TurboGrafx-16 CD add-on unit by Turbo Technologies Inc. in 1992.

== Gameplay ==
In this game, the player takes control of an ostrich that is able to navigate tiles suspended over a lake. Each round consists of a single screen play area with differently arranged tiles and enemies. The player must entrap enemies onto an area of the tile grid and then crack the tiles to make the enemies fall into the water. If the player is hit by an enemy, the player loses a hit point. If the player falls into the water or runs out of hit points, a life is lost and the level starts over. When all enemies are dumped into the lake, the player wins and moves on to the next level. Players can move in 4 directions and use the action buttons to crack a tile or jump over obstacles and enemies.

The game consists of approximately 60 levels, including boss levels. The game can be played single or two player. Every 10 levels there is a light hearted animated cutscene.

== Reception ==
Reception

Review scores
| Publication | Score |
|---|---|
| AllGame | 3.5/5 |
| Gekkan PC Engine | 90/100, 85/100, 80/100, 85/100, 80/100 |
| Joystick | 65% |
| Marukatsu PC Engine | 8/10, 9/10, 9/10, 8/10 |
| Electric Brain | 90% |
| Game Boy | 4/5, 3/5, 3/5, 5/5, 3/5 |
| Game Zero Magazine | 76.5/100 |
| Hippon Super! | 6/10 |
| TurboPlay | 7/10 |

Splash Lake garnered generally favorable reviews from critics.
