= Yoshinori Kanada =

Japanese animator (1952–2009)

- Born: February 5, 1952; Nara Prefecture, Japan
- Died: July 21, 2009 (aged 57); Tokyo, Japan
- Occupation: Animator
- Years active: 1970–2009

Yoshinori Kanada (金田 伊功, Kanada Yoshinori; February 5, 1952 – July 21, 2009) was a Japanese animator originally from Nara, Japan. He is best known for his popular 1984 work Birth, one of the first (after Dallos) original video animations released in the market. Though he did not create many character designs, he was famous for his character animation skills. His work on Galaxy Express 999 (1979) and Harmagedon (1983) were very influential to an entire generation of animators in Japan. These two works also served as partial inspiration for Takashi Murakami's Superflat art movement. During the 1980s and 1990s, he worked closely with director Hayao Miyazaki on several movies from Nausicaä of the Valley of the Wind to Princess Mononoke. He was also known for breaking down the directorial system in animation, allowing individual key animators to exert their own style into a particular work. He died at the age of 57 of a heart attack on July 21, 2009. His works inspired the art and works of animators such as Hiroyuki Imaishi, Masahito Yamashita, Akira Amemiya and Masami Obari. The final episode of Panty & Stocking with Garterbelt was dedicated in memory of him, and his influential work garnered special praise from many industry figures, such as Hayao Miyazaki.

== Anime and video game works ==
Partial list (he was involved in over 50 TV, OVA series and movies since the 70s, and also involved in many Square and Square Enix works)

- Castle in the Sky (Key Animation Supervision)
- Cyborg 009 (1979) (OP Animator)
- Birth (Character Design, Animation director, Lead Animator)
- Blue Submarine No. 6 (Key Animator)
- CLAMP School Detectives (Key Animator for Opening Animation)
- Cutie Honey (Key animation (last episode))
- Download (Character Design, Key Animation)
- Final Fantasy XIII (Storyboard Director)
- Final Fantasy: Legend of the Crystals (Key Animator)
- Final Fantasy: The Spirits Within (Key Animator, Layout Artist)
- Fullmetal Alchemist: Daughter of the Dusk (Key Animator, One of his last works)
- Fushigi Yuugi (OP Animator)
- Galaxy Express 999 (Key Animator)
- GeGeGe no Kitaro (OP Animator)
- Genesis Climber MOSPEADA (OP Animator)
- Harmagedon (Key Animator)
- Hanjuku Hero Tai 3D (Opening Animation Director)
- Hanjuku Hero 4: 7-Jin no Hanjuku Hero (Opening Animation Director)
- Kiki's Delivery Service (Key Animator)
- Mahou no Mako-chan (Animation)
- My Neighbor Totoro (Key Animator)
- Nausicaä of the Valley of the Wind (Key Animator)
- Night Warriors: Darkstalkers' Revenge (anime) (Key Animator)
- Porco Rosso (Key Animator)
- Princess Mononoke (Key Animator)
- Sarutobi Ecchan (Animation)
- Toward the Terra (Key Animator)
- X (1996 film) (Key Animator)
- Zukkoke Knight - Don De La Mancha (Storyboard (episode 6), Character Design, Key Animation (episode 6))
