= Shining Force: The Sword of Hajya =

1993 video game

- North American cover art
- Developer: Sonic! Software Planning
- Publisher: Sega
- Director: Shugo Takahashi
- Producer: Hiroyuki Takahashi
- Artist: Hiroshi Kajiyama
- Writers: Shugo Takahashi; Hiroyuki Takahashi
- Composer: Motoaki Takenouchi
- Series: Shining
- Platform: Game Gear
- Release: JP: June 25, 1993; NA: 1994
- Genre: Tactical role-playing
- Mode: Single-player

Shining Force: The Sword of Hajya (Note: Japanese: シャイニング・フォース外伝(がいでん)II ～邪神(じゃしん)の覚醒(めざめ)～, Hepburn: Shining Force Gaiden II: Jashin no Mezame) is a 1993 tactical role-playing game developed by Sonic! Software Planning and published by Sega for the Game Gear.

It is not to be confused with Shining Force II, as this Gaiden II is the sequel to the original Shining Force Gaiden. Along with the original Gaiden, The Sword of Hajya was remade as Shining Force CD, which contains two new scenarios that further continue the story of Cypress.

== Gameplay ==

Top: Dawn preparing to attack.
Bottom: A battle taking place.

The Sword of Hajya uses gameplay mechanics identical to its predecessor, Shining Force Gaiden. The player progresses through a series of turn-based tactical battles interspersed with short cutscenes. Between the cutscenes, the player is allowed to save the game, promote characters, resurrect fallen characters, and sometimes buy and sell weapons and healing items.

As with most strategy RPGs, each battlefield is divided up into a grid where player characters and enemies take turns moving, attacking, casting magic and using items. Player characters gain experience by battling enemies, and may choose, once they reach level 10, to upgrade their class into a more powerful one.

== Plot ==
Two months after Shining Force Gaiden, this story revolves around Deanna and his companions, young soldiers in the army of Cypress. Nick, the Prince of Cypress, has left the castle in order to defeat Iom, an aggressor nation. He leaves, however, without the powerful Sword of Hajya due to his inability to wield it, as his arm has been turned to stone. Deanna and his friends are left behind to defend the castle and the Sword, with Prince Nick's friend Mayfair placed in charge of them. When forces from Iom attack and steal the sword, Mayfair directs the young soldiers to pursue them in order to regain possession of the sword. The story is continued in new scenarios within Shining Force CD.

Shining Force Gaiden II/Shining Force: The Sword of Hajya is a direct continuation of the story of Shining Force Gaiden and takes place just two months after. Shining Force Gaiden tells how the war between Cypress and Iom began, how Nick befriended Mayfair, how his arm was turned to stone, and several other major plot points. Gyan, Ruce, Woldol, Randolf, and others all originally appeared in Shining Force Gaiden. Shining Force CD, in turn, contains a scenario which takes place just a few months after Shining Force: The Sword of Hajya and features most of the major characters. The hidden characters Hanzou and Musashi (mistranslated in the game as "Higins" and "Rush") previously appeared in Shining Force.

== Release ==
The North American release of Shining Force Gaiden II made drastic alterations to the spells Blaze level 3 and Freeze level 3, more than doubling the damage they inflict while increasing the radius of their effect from two to three squares. This results in mage characters being overpowered compared to other playable characters. Enemies with level 3 magic are also overpowered, as any one of them can kill several characters at full health in a single move.

The game was re-released on the 3DS Virtual Console on June 13, 2013, in North America, Europe and Australia.

== Reception ==
Reception

Review scores
Publication	Score
Electronic Gaming Monthly	7/10, 6/10, 6/10, 7/10, 7/10
Famitsu	7/10, 5/10, 7/10, 6/10

A reviewer in Electronic Gaming Monthly applauded the game for its musical score, graphics, and lengthy play time, and for retaining almost all the same elements as the two Shining Force games for the Sega Genesis.

VideoGames magazine awarded it Best Game Gear Game of 1994.

Retro Gamer included it their list of top ten Game Gear games.
