= Dragon Knight II =

1990 video game

- PC Engine cover art
- Developers: ELF Corporation; TamTam (PC Engine)
- Publishers: ELF Corporation; NEC Avenue (PC Engine)
- Director: Fumiko Suzuki
- Producers: Sachio Ishihara; Toshio Tabeta
- Designers: Masato Hiruta; Takami Sugimoto
- Programmers: Atsushi Kanao; Takefumi Kawakami; Hideki Iwatsuki
- Artists: Hiromitsu Suga; Atsuki Mizusawa; Kouichi Mikado
- Composers: Torou Hara; Tomoyuki Hamada; Shinji Yoshikawa
- Series: Dragon Knight
- Platforms: MSX2, PC-88, PC-98, X68000, PC Engine Super CD-ROM^{2}
- Release: PC-98; December 20, 1990; X68000; February 28, 1991; MSX2; March 1991; PC Engine; August 7, 1992
- Genres: Dungeon crawler, eroge

Dragon Knight II (Note: Japanese: ドラゴンナイトII, Hepburn: Doragon Naito Tsū) is a fantasy-themed eroge role-playing video game in the Dragon Knight franchise that was originally developed and published by ELF Corporation in 1990-1991 only in Japan as the first sequel to the original Dragon Knight game from 1989. The game is an erotic dungeon crawler in which a young warrior Takeru fights to lift a witch's curse that has turned girls into monsters.

Following the commercial and critical success of Dragon Knight II, ELF followed up with Dragon Knight III / Knights of Xentar in 1991. A censored remake of Dragon Knight II was published by NEC Avenue in 1992.

== Gameplay ==
Combat gameplay on the PC-98

Dragon Knight II is available only in Japanese. Its gameplay system has not changed much since the first Dragon Knight game, as it is still a standard dungeon crawler with first-person view perspective and 2D graphics. The player spends most of the time navigating dungeon-like mazes and fighting enemies. As progress is made, the mazes will become more complicated, but as in the first game there is an aid for the player in the form of a mini-map with grid coordinates. The player can also visit shops and converse with non-hostile NPCs.

The game starts with just one player character, Takeru, but two other characters join up later on. The game's battle system has also undergone minor changes. It still features turn-based battles that are mostly randomly generated, but the fights are better balanced than in the first game. The player can attack, defend, and use spells and items to deal with various types of female enemies (berserker, banshee, catgirl, centaur, elf, harpy, ninja, mummy, werewolf, and so on), who are being fought only one at a time. These enemies are actually girls who have been transformed into monsters, and whenever the player character fights off one of them, the subdued enemy loses her clothing. Later, when the enemies revert to their normal self, in their gratitude they offer themselves to have sex with the protagonist in a cutscene (censored in the console versions). There is also only one boss to beat at the end.

== Plot ==
=== Characters ===
- Takeru Yamato (ヤマト・タケル), the protagonist of most media in the Dragon Knight franchise, is womanizing young swordsman, who following his victory over the evil Dragon Knights in the previous game, arrives in Phoenix after Baan made him deliver mysterious scriptures there. At the end of the game, the mystery of his birth and his destiny are revealed. Voiced by Akira Kamiya.
- Baan (バーン) is traveling burly merchant of great physical strength, who first sends Takeru to Phoenix and later joins him on his quest. He seems to be harboring a secret for why he has been avoiding Phoenix and later falls in love with Sophia. Voiced by Banjo Ginga.
- Sophia (ソフィア) is lovely white magic-user who arrives to Phonenix and offers to aid Takeru mid-game. She is capable of casting healing and teleportation spells, but can not engage in physical combat. Voiced by Sumi Shimamoto.
- Mesaanya (メサーニャ), the game's antagonist, is a sexy evil witch who hates all men because of the war 300 years ago and has taken the daughters of Phoenix. Voiced by Yumi Nakatani and Risa Hatayama. She also returns as a boss in a special raid quest "Dragon Rush" in Dragon Knight V.
- Elder (チョウロウ) is the old village chief of Phoenix, who has been looking for a way to get rid of Mesaanya's threat. Voiced by Kōji Yada.
- Kate (ケイト) is Phoenix Elder's beautiful granddaughter taken hostage by Mesaanya, who uses Kate to taunt the heroes by increasingly molesting her. Kate fancies Takeru even as she is already engaged. Voiced by Aya Hisakawa. In Dragon Knight V, Kate can join the party as a player character after defeating Mesanya.

Other characters and their voice actors include the Taverner (Totani Koji), the Weaponsmith (Yukitoshi Hori), the Old Witch (Hiroyuki Sato), the Apothecary Witch (Isamu Tanonaka), Rem (Lisa Hatayama), Mei (Noriko Namiki), Messiah (Natsuko Yamada), Merumo (Mayumi Horikawa), Cherry (Akiko Sato), Orchid (Azusa Nakao), Mami (Kaori Ohara), Hamy (Minako Takenouchi), Rika (Tomomi Uesaka), Monami (Masami Suzuki), Mischa (Mihoko Fujiwara), Tanya (Yasuko Kajimura), Nadia (Yuki Kato), Bunny (Junko Shimakata), Mimi (Yoko Asada), Paula (Naomi Matamura), Betty (Yumiko Sakita), Marie (Mayumi Seto), Lina (Mayumi Shigeno), Eve (Megumi Kanba), Nina (Naoko Nakamura), and Lara (Yasuko Hirayama). The game was narrated by Kaneto Shiozawa.

=== Story ===
The vagabond youth hero of the first Dragon Knight, Takeru Yamato, wanders into a small town of Phoenix and finds it terrorized and devoid of young men, its only residents being few older men and many more unmarried young girls. Next morning after Takeru's arrival, he sees the town changed. He learns that Phoenix had been once ruled by a group of female demons known as the Witch Clan until they were destroyed by their rivals, the all-male Dragon Knights. Three years before the events of the game, a woman known as Mesaanya had arrived in Phoenix. At first she has appeared very friendly and gained the villagers' trust as a healer, but then she revealed her true colors as she took over the Witch Tower and forbade the love between men and women. Now that her commandment was broken, she has turned dozens of kidnapped village girls into different monster minions to guard the Witch Tower and also possessed a young maiden named Kate. After Mesaanya steals a sacred book containing the set of evil-sealing holy scriptures that Takeru delivered for the Elder from Baan before it could be used against her, Takeru reluctantly agreed to enter the tower and collect the scriptures to break the curse.

The ultimate goal of Takeru is to reach and defeat Mesaanya, who is supposed to await then at the top of the tower, but he also needs to rescue the girls one by one. During the course of the game, Takeru is joined by a burly merchant named Baan, who has originally sent him to Phoenix, and later also a mysterious spell-casting priestess named Sophia. He also meets and rescues Kate's fiancé, a young man from a neighboring town who went first to rescue Kate without combat experience and disappeared.

Eventually, almost all the bewitched girls are saved but Kate was nowhere to be found. They still need to find Mesaanya, since the witch's throne room was found empty. Meanwhile, Takeru has learned how the Witch Clan have been conquered with the help of the unique magical metal ore found there and used to create the Falcon Sword that can destroy any evil being and the Genji Armor capable of resisting any magic. Searching for these artifacts, the party descends into a hidden dungeon in the town graveyard where Baan reveals it was his ancestor who had led the Dragon Knights' battle against the Witch Clan 300 years earlier and killed many including their queen, Mesaanya's ancestor. Baan has kept his part-demon heritage secret out of shame. In a twist ending, Sophia's true identity is revealed having been really a disguised Mesaanya all along. Her magic blast gravely wounds Baan and then she is shocked when Takeru, who is revealed to be a son of god and the legendary armor set wraps itself around him and the decisive duel commences. Once Takeru's victory results in Mesaanya's destruction, Kate is freed from her spell and peace is finally restored to the village. With his quest completed, Takeru then spends a night with Kate, who is about to marry, before leaving for his further adventures.

== Release ==
The game was originally released in 1990-1991 for the MSX2, NEC PC-8801, NEC PC-9801 and X68000 computer systems. An enhanced PC Engine port that removed sexually explicit content but added voice acting and new graphics was developed by TamTam and released by NEC Avenue in 1992 among controversies as the first erotic game officially published for a video game console. Two soundtracks were released in Japan by NEC Avenue: Dragon Knight II Fantastic Remix! (ドラゴンナイト II ファンタスティック・リミックス!) in October 1991 and Dragon Knight II PC Engine World (ドラゴンナイト II ～PCエンジンワールド) in 1992, distributed by Nippon Columbia.

== Reception ==
Reception

Review scores
Publication	Score
PC Engine Fan	90% (PC Engine)
Famitsu	24/40

Just like its predecessor, Dragon Knight II was a commercial success. The game placed third on MSX Magazines "MSX Soft Top 30" best-selling chart in May 1991, and even one year later has remained there at 28th place. The PC Engine version was fifth on PC Engine Fan chart in August 1992. The magazine's review gave it a highly positive score of 90%. Famitsu gave it a score 24/40.

Electronic Gaming Monthly (EGM) reported that Dragon Knight II became a sleeper hit with Japanese role-playing fans. EGM said that it was noticeably different from other RPGs because the game offered more women instead of monsters, and, with more action and more scantily clad women to attack, thought that it will entice the Japanese market. EGM also included the game's "tons of interesting people to meet" in their 1993 ranking of "Top Ten Hottest Video Game Babes" at second place. PC Engine Fan listed Mesaanya, Sophia and Kate among the sexiest female characters in the PC Engine games.

== Sequel ==
Takeru (renamed Desmond in the West) returns as the hero of the 1991 sequel Dragon Knight III. It is titled Knights of Xentar in highly rewritten Western-localized versions. Phoenix, where Takeru is a celebrity and the former Witch Tower which is renamed as the Tower of Takeru in honor, is revisited in the sequel. The fully recovered Baan rejoins him there to fight the demons and Kate is romantically met again. Takeru uses the Falcon Sword and the Genji Armor again, and Baan marries Marie, one of the girls from Dragon Knight II.
