= Knights of Xentar =

1991 video game

- Developer: JP: ELF Corporation, NEC Avenue
- Publisher: NA: Megatech Software
- Producers: Masato Hiruta; Shigeru Mabuchi
- Designers: Shinichi Mori; A. Nako
- Artists: Masatsune Noguchi; Atsushi Shimoda
- Writer: David Moskowitz (American version)
- Composers: Manabu Kunieda; H. Sano
- Series: Dragon Knight
- Platforms: MS-DOS, PC-9801, FM Towns, X68000, PC Engine CD
- Release: X68000: JP: January 31, 1992; PC-Engine CD: JP: July 22, 1994; NA: 1995
- Genre: RPG
- Mode: Single-player

Knights of Xentar is an eroge role-playing video game published for MS-DOS compatible operating systems in North America by Megatech Software in 1995. It was originally published as Dragon Knight III (Note: Japanese: ドラゴンナイトIII, Hepburn: Doragon Naito Surī) in Japan. It is part of the Dragon Knight series of games created by Japanese game developer ELF, who originally released the game for the NEC PC-9801 computer in 1991, followed by ports for the X68000 and PC Engine CD in 1992 and 1994. In addition to the regular version of the game, the PC port also has an "adult" version with more explicit nudity.

The game is a sequel to Dragon Knight and Dragon Knight II. Its gameplay system is different from that of previous installments of the Dragon Knight series, resembling this of the early Final Fantasy (even more in the PC version) series instead of first-person-view dungeon crawler, and enabling the player to explore the entire world of the game. Some of the characters were renamed in the English and German localized Knights of Xentar release, including the protagonist Takeru's name changed to Desmond.

== Gameplay ==
Boss battle on the PC Engine

The RPG system is completely different from that of the previous games in the Dragon Knight series. The player travels with a top-down view on the world map, visiting towns and dungeons (including Strawberry Fields and Phoenix from the first two games, Dragon Knight and Dragon Knight II respectively). The game's quest is nearly two times longer than the series' first episode.

The enemy encounters are random and the battles, depending on the version, are displayed either in a first-person perspective like in the previous games in the series (similar to these in Wizardry) or in a side-view style (like in many other Japanese RPGs from that era such as the early Final Fantasy entries). The battles are partially automated with the enemies and characters attacking each other in real-time. A battle can be paused at any time to cast a spell, use an item, or change attack style through a list of AI scripts. There are eight levels of attack strength, each with its advantages and disadvantages (for example, more powerful attack levels require more time).

The game features cartoonish cut scenes, many of which contain nude erotic images - the girls the main character encounters and helps will often feel grateful and award him with sexual favors. However, there are no explicit hardcore sex scenes in the game and the girls' genital areas are censored as in most eroge (the sound of a toilet flushing is played when the main character supposedly reaches his climax). Visiting a girl for a sexual encounter has the same effect as resting in an Inn for most traditional RPGs: HP and MP are restored. Crude erotic humour is combined with classical fairy tales; the hero for example saves Little Red Riding Hood from rape by the Wolf, and Snow White from rape by the seven dwarves.

== Plot ==
The main character is a young wandering hero warrior named Desmond (タケル, Takeru). After liberating Strawberry Fields (now called Arcadia) from a demon's curse and saving the girls of city of Phoenix from an evil witch queen in his previous adventures, Desmond finds himself in a situation unworthy of his heroic status: robbers have taken all his possessions, including his legendary armor, his magic sword, and even his clothes. The first task for the unsuccessful hero is to get some money. Luckily, the mayor has an assignment for him, for which he is also willing to pay. Desmond accepts the assignment without knowing what it will lead to - traveling all over the world, fighting fearsome enemies, encountering beautiful women, and solving a mystery that will also reveal the secret of his own true identity.

In his journeys, Desmond is repeatedly attacked by demons. In the process, his companion Rolf (バーン, Bān) from Dragon Knight II and the sorceress Luna (ルナ) from Dragon Knight join him. He dreams of a woman who later turns out to be the goddess of light Althea (メシア, Meshia). She and the god of darkness Deimos (ディード, Dīdo) have made an agreement that they would decide the fate of the world through a duel between their respective children. Desmond is the son of Althea and his friend, the black knight Arstein (アルスティーン, Arusutīn) is the son of Deimos. Since Arstein does not want to kill his friend Desmond, he gets Desmond to kill him. Since Deimos does not stick to the agreement and attacks Althea, the group has to fight against him in the end.

After Deimos is destroyed, Desmond is offered an ascension to the council of gods, but decides to stay in the mortal world. He marries Luna, and Arcadia's ruler Princess Diana (ネイナ, Naina) builds them a great palace. Rolf marries Marie (from Dragon Knight II).

== Release ==
Knights of Xentar was the second hentai RPG released by Megatech Software after Cobra Mission and remains the only Dragon Knight game to be ever released outside Japan. A CD-ROM "full talkie" version was also produced. The game has been originally released in Japan for different platforms between 1991 and 1994. A soundtrack CD was also released in 1992 and 1994.

Megatech could not use the title "Dragon Knight" in the West due to copyright reasons. In their version of the game, the names of the two main characters were changed: Baan as he was known in the Japanese version was changed to Rolf and Takeru, the main hero of the game, was changed to Desmond. The dialogue was also modified, having a major localization overhaul in the same manner that Working Designs approached in translating several JRPGs. For example, the North American release's dialogue included many American pop culture references and jokes, and several times broke the fourth wall with the Megatech script writers even joining in the heroes' conversation. Desmond's partners Rolf and Luna, and even some of the girls, Desmond meets make fun of him cruelly for his small penis and body odor problem (not existent in the Japanese version). Megatech released two versions of this game: NR-13 and NR-18 (USK 12 and USK 16 in Germany), and the NR-13 version can be upgraded to the NR-18 version via a software patch. The NR-18 version is the uncensored version whereas the NR-13 is censored in that all the nude girls had their private parts covered up by hands or clothing and some of the crude, crass dialogue was edited as well.

== Reception ==
Reception

Review scores
Publication	Score
Famitsu	7/10, 6/10, 6/10, 5/10 (PCECD)
Génération 4	(DOS) 53%
Joypad	(PCECD) 93%
Micromanía	(DOS) 85/100
PC Engine Fan	(PCECD) 23.5/30
Megazin	(DOS) 80/100
PC Joker	(DOS) 62%
PC Player	(DOS) 61/100
Power Play	(DOS) 59%
Score	(DOS) 80%

The X68000 version of Knights of Xentar (Dragon Knight III) proved popular among the computer's userbase in Japan. Japanese magazine PC Engine Fan commended the PC Engine CD conversion for the characters, music and controls. Joypad's Grégoire Hellot gave the PC Engine CD release a highly positive outlook.

James V. Trunzo reviewed Knights of Xentar in White Wolf Inphobia #56 (June, 1995), rating it a 3 out of 5 and stated that "If it seems like I'm coming down hard on Knights of Xentar, I am! Actually, the adventure isn't really bad, and for those who enjoy anime Knights of Xentar might be just what you're looking for. Taken with tongue firmly in cheek and playing it for what might be interpreted as satirical humor, the game has even more merit. While it's obvious that Knights of Xentar isn't for everyone, you might want to check it out just for its weirdness."
