= Traverse: Starlight & Prairie =

1996 video game

- Developer(s): Pandora Box
- Publisher(s): Banpresto
- Platform(s): Super Famicom
- Release: JP: June 28, 1996
- Genre(s): Role-playing game
- Mode(s): Single-player

Traverse: Starlight & Prairie (トラバース スターライト&プレーリー) is a Japanese-only non-linear, turn-based role-playing video game developed by Pandora Box and published by Banpresto in 1996. It is a sequel to Soul & Sword, with a few returning characters.

== Gameplay ==
After the tutorial, the player may freely walk around the world map to visit cities or discover hidden places. The objective is to find and accomplish all the quests in order to unlock the true ending. Alternate endings are also present by marrying the different female characters, which is only possible after fulfilling specific conditions. It contains a time and weather system, with events happening only during specific moments of the year or after a certain amount of time.

Throughout the adventure, thirty characters can join the team. Each possesses unique skills (stealing, paralyzing, healing, etc.), fixed stats, and the ability to use a few weapons or spells. As there is no experience system, characters can only become stronger by using their weapons and spells or acquiring new equipment, save for the hero, Gantt, whose stats can change by completing some events.
