= Shining Force CD =

1994 video game

- European box art
- Developer: Sonic! Software Planning
- Publisher: Sega
- Director: Yasuhiro Taguchi
- Producers: Shugo Takahashi; Hiroyuki Takahashi
- Designers: Shuji Shimizu; Tatsuya Niikura; Ayumu Shindo
- Programmers: Yasuhiro Taguchi; Kenji Numaya; Yutaka Yamamoto
- Artists: Hiroshi Kajiyama; Masayuki Hashimoto; Fumihide Aoki
- Writer: Shugo Takahashi
- Composer: Motoaki Takenouchi
- Series: Shining
- Platform: Sega CD
- Release: JP: 22 July 1994; PAL: April 1995; NA: 1995
- Genre: Tactical role-playing
- Mode: Single-player

Shining Force CD (シャイニングフォースCD) is a 1994 tactical role-playing game developed by Sonic! Software Planning and published by Sega for the Sega CD. It is a remake of the games Shining Force Gaiden and Shining Force Gaiden II, originally for the Game Gear. Although the game went largely unnoticed upon release in 1995, it has gained a cult following and is considered to be one of the best titles released for the Sega CD.

== Gameplay ==

Top: Wendy preparing to move.
Bottom: A battle taking place.

The gameplay mechanics are identical to those of the Shining Force Gaiden games. The player progresses through a series of turn-based tactical battles interspersed with short cutscenes. Between cutscenes, the player is allowed to save the game, promote characters, resurrect fallen characters, and sometimes buy and sell weapons and healing items.

Shining Force CD is divided into four "Books" that can be played sequentially or separately. The first two Books contain the adapted versions of the Gaiden games. The other two Books are new scenarios exclusive to Shining Force CD that continue the story of those games.

Only Books 1 and 2 are available from the beginning. Book 3 is unlocked by completing Books 1 and 2, while Book 4 can be accessed by completing Books 1-3 and finding a hidden item in Book 2. Character stats from Books 1 and 2 can be carried over to Book 3 by saving the game on a backup RAM cart since the Sega CD's internal memory is not enough to keep all the data files. Character stats from Book 3 can similarly be transferred to Book 4.

== Plot ==
=== Book 1 ===
The ambassador of Cypress, Woldol, pays a visit to Guardiana (erroneously written as "Gardiana" here) and presents a jeweled box as a gift for Queen Anri. Opening the box places her under a sleep spell, which Woldol declares that only King Edmond of Cypress can awaken her from. Guardiana launches an invasion of Cypress in retaliation, but a month passes and no word is heard from the Guardiana army.

The player controls Nick, a visitor, who is chosen to be the new leader of the Guardiana Shining Force. The party travels to the kingdom of Cypress to rescue Guardiana's captive soldiers and find a way to cure Queen Anri. On their journey, they are joined by members of the Cypress resistance force, who are fighting to free Cypress from the influence of Woldol, who murdered the rightful king and installed Edmond as a puppet ruler in service to the evil god Iom. The Guardiana army also learns that Nick is, in fact, the son of the late king.

In a final assault on Cypress's castle, Edmond is killed. Nick battles Woldol using the Sword of Hajya, which can only be wielded by those of the royal bloodline of Cypress and is the only weapon which can break Iom's power. Though victorious, Nick is infected with a venom that turns his right arm to stone. With Queen Anri cured by Prince Nick's actions, Guardiana becomes Cypress's ally.

=== Book 2 ===
Cypress and Guardiana are now at war with Iom, a nation devoted to the evil god of the same name. The player now assumes the role of Deanna, a young man found wounded by the cliffs near Cypress's castle by two young Cypress soldiers, Natasha and Dawn. Nick and his troops depart to battle Iom, leaving Mayfair (a former member of the Cypress resistance) and several soldiers in charge of the castle. Once recuperated, Deanna joins them on guard duty, and though shy by nature, he begins to bond with Natasha.

An Iom agent steals the Sword of Hajya from the castle. A small team of young soldiers left to guard the castle, led by Natasha and guided by Mayfair, set out to hunt down the thief and reclaim the Sword of Hayja. Their pursuit takes them to the neighboring kingdom of Emild, whose ruler has been sacrificed to Iom and replaced with the shapeshifting general Gordon. They recover the Sword of Hajya from Gordon, but immediately after a mysterious benefactor informs them that Prince Nick was defeated and taken prisoner.

Natasha's force now heads to Iom to rescue Prince Nick. Their mysterious benefactor repeatedly comes to their aid but refuses to identify himself. They learn that Warderer, the king of Iom, is sacrificing members of royalty to Iom in order to summon the god to their world and that he intends to make Nick the next sacrifice.

When the Cypress force confronts Warderer, General Hindel of Iom rescues Nick. Nick explains that Hindel betrayed Iom in order to save Deanna, Hindel's brother and that the Cypress force's mysterious benefactor was sent by Hindel. Deanna had in fact been wounded by a Cypress soldier while serving in an invading force from Iom. Following this revelation, an enraged Warderer kills Hindel and sacrifices himself to Iom, thereby summoning the evil god. Nick and his men defeat Iom, sending him back to Hades. With the war over, Natasha and the others return to Cypress with Prince Nick. Deanna ultimately decides he must return home to Iom, despite his love for Natasha and the new friendships he has formed in Cypress. But Natasha, who has fallen in love with Deanna, insists on going with him.

=== Book 3 ===
The player again assumes the role of Nick. Several months after Iom's defeat, Prince Nick's coronation ceremony is interrupted by an old woman named Dava. She asserts that Nick is unworthy of being crowned king and kidnaps Queen Anri. To prove himself worthy of the crown, Prince Nick must lead the Cypress army and his friends from Guardiana to rescue the lost queen.

=== Book 4 ===
Nick and his friends are visiting the most historic museum in Cypress when the exhibits of Nick's greatest enemies suddenly come to life.

== Release ==
Shining Force CD was released in Japan in July 1994. At this time, Sega of America stated that they had no plans to release the game outside of Japan, but they later changed their minds, and the game was released in both North America and Europe.

The localization of Shining Force CD is a generally more accurate translation than its predecessors, Shining Force and Shining Force II, though some changes were made. The characters Hanzou and Musashi, who previously appeared in Shining Force, are referred to in Shining Force CD's localization as "Higgins" and "Rush", respectively. Also, in Book 2, Mayfair inexplicably refers to Ruce as "Scavenger".

It was re-released on the Sega Genesis Mini 2 on October, 27 2022.

== Reception ==
Reception

Review score
| Publication | Score |
|---|---|
| Famitsu | 8/10, 7/10, 7/10, 6/10 |

On release, GamePro gave Shining Force CD a mixed review. They praised the quality of the strategic gameplay and graphics perspectives but were critical of the fact that the game doesn't significantly differ from its predecessors Shining Force and Shining Force II in either of those elements. A reviewer for Next Generation, while concurring that the game differs little from its predecessors in the mechanics, felt that the new content was enough to keep the game fresh even to fans of the series. Citing the exciting battles, detailed fight animations, and sense of exploration, he deemed Shining Force CD a must-have for Sega CD owners and gave it four out of five stars.

Retro Gamer included this "almost overwhelming" and "epic" title among their top ten Mega CD games. Though Next Generation listed all the Genesis and Sega CD entries of the Shining series collectively as number 77 on their list of the "Top 100 Games of All Time", they made special note of Shining Force CD as "one of the largest RPGs ever made".
