= Beyond Oasis =

1994 video game

- North American cover art
- Developer: Ancient
- Publisher: Sega
- Producer: Yuzo Koshiro
- Designer: Kataru Uchimura
- Programmer: Yukio Takahashi
- Artist: Ayano Koshiro
- Writer: Juri Ogawa
- Composer: Yuzo Koshiro
- Platform: Sega Genesis
- Release: JP: December 9, 1994; PAL: March 1, 1995; NA: March 1995
- Genre: Action-adventure
- Mode: Single-player

Beyond Oasis (Note: known in Europe and Japan as The Story of Thor and Story of Thor ~Successor of the Light~) is a 1994 action-adventure game developed by Ancient and published by Sega for the Sega Genesis. The game has also been re-released in various emulated collections. A prequel to the game, The Legend of Oasis, was released for the Sega Saturn in 1996.

== Plot ==
The player takes the role of Prince Ali, who has discovered a buried gold "armlet" which once belonged to a wizard who waged a long war against the evil wielder of a silver armlet. The silver armlet was used to create chaos and destruction, while the gold armlet had the power to summon four spirits: the water spirit, "Dytto"; the fire spirit, "Efreet"; the shadow spirit, "Shade"; and the plant spirit, "Bow". Ali travels the land of Oasis, gradually acquiring the ability to summon all these spirits, in an attempt to stop the person who has discovered the ancient silver armlet and is once again using it for evil.

== Gameplay ==
The game has action adventure elements similar to The Legend of Zelda series. The player controls Prince Ali and control him across the map to fulfill his quest. Along the way the player picks up special items to restore health and mana, special weapons to help defeat enemies, and four magic spirits found in shrines to aid Prince Ali in his mission.

Prince Ali's default weapon is his knife, which can perform special attacks and has unlimited usage, but during the course of the game the player can equip Prince Ali with special weapons such as swords, crossbows, and bombs. Some crossbows (and a sword) can ignite their targets on fire. However, unlike the knife, these weapons do generally not have unlimited usage and will break after a set number of uses, unless unlimited versions of these weapons are found.

== Re-releases ==
Beyond Oasis was re-released as a downloadable game for various home and portable platforms: on the Wii Virtual Console in 2007, on Steam in 2012, App Store and Google Play Store in 2017 (now delisted), and the Nintendo Classics service in 2022. Additionally, the game was included in the 2009 Sonic's Ultimate Genesis Collection compilation for PlayStation 3 and Xbox 360, Vol.5 of Sega Genesis Classics, and was preloaded on the Sega Genesis Mini hardware.

== Reception ==
Reception

Aggregate score
Aggregator	Score
GameRankings	78%

Review scores
Publication	Score
Beep! MegaDrive	8/10
Computer and Video Games	89/100
Electronic Gaming Monthly	8/10, 8/10, 7/10, 7/10, 8/10
Famitsu	6/10, 7/10, 6/10, 5/10
Game Informer	8.75/10
Game Players	75%
GameFan	92/100, 95/100, 97/100
GamesMaster	93%
Hyper	83%
Mean Machines Sega	93/100
Next Generation	2/5
Electronic Games	C+
Games World	93/100
Mega	93%
Sega Magazine	90/100
Sega Power	93%
Sega Pro	90%
Ultimate Future Games	84%
VideoGames	8/10

Award
Publication	Award
GameFan (1995)	Action RPG of the Year

The Japanese publication Micom BASIC Magazine ranked the game third in popularity in its March 1995 issue, and it received a 22.8/30 score in a poll conducted by Mega Drive Fan and a 8.2138/10 score in a 1995 readers' poll conducted by the Japanese Sega Saturn Magazine, ranking among Sega Mega Drive titles at the number 78 spot. Beyond Oasis received generally favorable reception from critics, holding a rating of 78% based on seven reviews according to review aggregator GameRankings.

Electronic Gaming Monthly praised its vast game world and strong plot twists. Next Generation contended that the combination of RPG and action elements results in a game which is average on both fronts. He added: "The use of magic, whether it be the fireball or meteor storm; a user-friendly interface; and an ever-ready map put Beyond Oasis beyond others of its type. But ultimately, poor fighting and an uninspired storyline leave this title looking more like a mirage." GamePro's The Unknown Gamer commented that the game "is definitely not for hardcore RPGers" due to its small game world, limited challenge, and greater emphasis on hack-n-slash combat and puzzle solving than on RPG elements, but would be a good game for players new to the RPG genre. They praised the "intriguing" gameplay and the 3D feel of the graphics.

IGN gave the Virtual Console re-release an 8/10, calling it "very stylish," and expressing "surprise" that despite a lack of polish in certain areas, its "unique" mechanics "deserve to be mentioned alongside such classics as Secret of Mana". In 2017, GamesRadar rated Beyond Oasis 38th on their Best Sega Genesis/Mega Drive games of all time, giving praise to the game's graphics and sound.
