= Shining Force Gaiden =

1991 video game

- Developer: Sonic! Software Planning
- Publisher: Sega
- Director: Shugo Takahashi
- Producer: Hiroyuki Takahashi
- Artists: Tomonori Shinjo; Kensuke Suzuki
- Writer: Hiroyuki Takahashi
- Composer: Motoaki Takenouchi
- Series: Shining
- Platform: Game Gear
- Release: JP: 25 December 1992
- Genre: Tactical role-playing game
- Mode: Single-player

Shining Force Gaiden: Ensei – Jashin no Kuni he (シャイニング・フォース外伝 ～遠征・邪神の国へ～) (Note: Shining Force CD translates this subtitle as "Towards the Root of Evil".) is a 1992 tactical role-playing game developed by Sonic! Software Planning and released by Sega only in Japan for the Game Gear. It takes place 20 years after the Shining Force, and is the first game in the Shining Force Gaiden series.

In 1994, a remake of Gaiden and the sequel Shining Force: The Sword of Hajya was released for the Sega CD, titled Shining Force CD. Unlike the originals, this version was released in Japan, North America, and Europe. Shining Force CD also contains two new scenarios that continue the story of these two Gaiden games.

== Gameplay ==

Top: Wendy preparing to attack.
Bottom: A battle taking place.

The game consists of a series of turn-based tactical battles interspersed with short cutscenes. Between cutscenes the player is allowed to save the game, promote characters, resurrect fallen characters, and sometimes buy and sell weapons and healing items. The combat and leveling mechanics are identical to those of Shining Force.

== Plot ==
The player controls Nick, a visitor to Guardiana, who is chosen to be the new leader of the Guardiana Shining Force. The party must travel to the Kingdom of Cypress to rescue Guardiana's captive soldiers and find a way to cure Queen Anri, who was placed under a sleep spell by the ambassador of Cypress, Woldol.

The game takes place 20 years after the events of Shining Force, and is in effect a "story sequel" to it. The story continues the history of Guardiana and centers on a new threat to the nation. Anri, Ken, Lug (called "Luke" in Shining Force and its Resurrection of the Dark Dragon remake), and Lowe, who were playable characters in Shining Force, are all major characters, and Lug briefly serves as a playable character. Domingo, another Shining Force playable character, appears as a hidden character in this game. The initial party members include the sons of Lug, Ken, and Hans, the sister of Tao, and the nephew of Gong.

Shining Force Gaiden is also the beginning of the Cypress saga, which is continued in the Game Gear game Shining Force: The Sword of Hajya and the Sega CD game Shining Force CD. Shining Force: The Sword of Hajya is a direct continuation of the story of Shining Force Gaiden; it takes place just two months after and covers the resolution of the war between the forces of Cypress and the worshipers of Iom.
