= The Dragon Knight (film) =

- Poster
- 洛克王国之圣龙骑士
- Directed by: Shengjun Yu
- Production companies: Shenzhen Tencent Computer Systems; UYONG Media; Toonmax Media; Beijing Ironhide Frog Creativity Media
- Release date: September 30, 2011
- Running time: 90 minutes
- Country: China
- Language: Mandarin
- Box office: CN¥27.3 million

The Dragon Knight (Chinese: 洛克王国之圣龙骑士) is a 2011 Chinese animated film directed by Shengjun Yu. The film was released on September 30, 2011.

== Reception ==
The film earned CN¥27.281 million at the Chinese box office.
