= Cobra Mission: Panic in Cobra City =

- Developer: INOS
- Publishers: JP: Hard; NA: Megatech Software
- Platforms: PC-98, MS-DOS
- Release: JP: October 25, 1991 (PC-98); NA: September 9, 1992; EU: 1993
- Genres: Adventure, eroge

Cobra Mission: Panic in Cobra City is an MS-DOS adventure game published in 1992 in North America by Megatech Software as a port of the 1991 PC-98 Cobra Mission (コブラミッション) game by INOS.

Megatech Software distributed Cobra Mission: Panic in Cobra City in 1992, making it one of the first translated hentai-related video games released in English-territories.

== Gameplay ==
Gameplay screenshot (MS-DOS)

The gameplay in Cobra Mission uses a simple point and click interface. The fighting system would display an image of a character that was attacking and the player had the opportunity to attack that opponent in a particular part of their body. Each character would have some part of their body that was vulnerable and this would cause greater damage than a regular hit. The Japanese version of this game used a turn based, menu style, combat system.

A similar system was used for the game's numerous sex scenes. There are a total of five interactive sex scenes (and four non-interactive ones) in which the player would choose an item to use (hands, lips, etc.) and click on a part of the woman's body, and this would cause her pleasure meter to either increase or decrease. If the player made too many mistakes, then the woman would get upset and leave. If the player filled her meter, then they would be able to finish the sex scene successfully.

== Plot ==
The story takes place on a small, fictitious town of Cobra City. Satoru Fujii meets up with his sidekick, Midori. Midori tells him the story of how women on Cobra Island are disappearing at a rapid rate and the mob boss of the Black Gang, Hōmura, is believed to be the one causing it. Satoru makes it his job to find and stop whoever is causing the women to disappear.

== Release ==
Megatech Software distributed Cobra Mission: Panic in Cobra City in 1992, making it one of the first translated hentai-related video games released in English-territories.

== Reception ==
Reception

Review scores
Publication	Score
Aktueller Software Markt	4/12
Dragon	X
Génération 4	82%
Micromanía	83/100
PC Games (DE)	73/100
Tilt	75%
PC Joker	42%
PC Player	45/100
Play Time	73%
Power Unlimited	95/100

Cobra Mission: Panic in Cobra City received mixed reviews from critics since its release. Aktueller Software Markt's Marcus Höfer commended the audiovisual presentation but panned the controls, atmosphere and lack of additional story paths, regarding the animations and visuals to be the game's only main driving force. PC Joker's Monika Stoschek commended the mouse controls and menus for being easy to use but regarded the gameplay to be repetitive and the visuals as poor, stating that the "half-naked females presented in between are probably a matter of taste." PC Player's Heinrich Lenhardt also criticized the gameplay for being bland and high retail price, stating that it would go under as a "gray RPG" without the mild sex and crime factors. Dragon's three reviewers would normally assign a game a rating from 1 to 5 stars, but gave Cobra Mission an "X" for being an uninteresting adventure game. They found the explicit nudity, sexual connotations and foul language unsuitable, while criticizing the animations and English translation but commended the graphics for being faithful to the Japanese original.

PC Games' Thomas Brenner disagreed with the statement of Dragon's reviewers, doubting that Cobra Mission could be harmful to young players as advertised on the packaging. Brenner stated that the nudity scenes were not stunning but found himself impressed with the dialog for being funny and suggestive. Play Time's Arthur Kreklau commended the game's audiovisual presentation and idea but found its gameplay to be repetitive. Tilt's Jean-Loup Jovanovic praised the visuals, audio and playability but felt mixed in regard to the title's longevity and criticized the animations. Micromanía's F.H.G. praised its sense of humor, erotism, comic-like presentation, graphics, sound and animations but felt mixed in regard to the originality and criticized the low difficulty, while warning that the sexual content on-display makes it unsuitable for younger audiences. Génération 4's Christian Roux gave positive remarks to its longevity, animations and sound but criticized the graphically stripped down top-down segments and repetitive gameplay.
