= The Legend of Oasis =

1996 video game

- North American cover art
- Developer: Ancient
- Publisher: Sega
- Producer: Yuzo Koshiro
- Designer: Kataru Uchimura
- Programmer: Yukio Takahashi
- Artist: Ayano Koshiro
- Writer: Juri Ogawa
- Composer: Yuzo Koshiro
- Series: Oasis
- Platform: Sega Saturn
- Release: JP: 26 April 1996; NA: 31 July 1996; PAL: 19 September 1996
- Genre: Action role-playing
- Mode: Single-player

The Legend of Oasis, released as The Story of Thor 2 in Europe and as Thor: Chronicles of the Elemental King (Note: Japanese: トア: 精霊王紀伝, Hepburn: Thor: Seirei Ou Kiden) in Japan, is a 1996 action role-playing game developed by Ancient and published by Sega for the Sega Saturn. It is the successor and prequel to the 1994 title Beyond Oasis for the Sega Mega Drive/Genesis. The player takes the role of Leon, who must find the six elemental spirits and use their powers to fight the evil wizard Agito and his legions of creatures.

The game was first announced under the title Legend of Thor. It was originally planned for the 32X add-on shortly after the release of its predecessor; however, the idea was scrapped before the game's development, according to an official statement and documents from Ancient.

== Plot ==
Many years before the events in Beyond Oasis, the warrior Ordan gives his young pupil Leon the Golden Armlet, so that he can become the Spirit King of Oasis. This can only be achieved by obtaining the loyalty of the six elemental spirits of the land, which are called Dytto (the spirit of water), Efreet (the spirit of fire), Bawu (the spirit of earth), Brass (the spirit of sound), Shade (the spirit of darkness), and Airl (the spirit of air). Leon's nemesis is the evil wizard Agito who has the Silver Armlet and threatens to destroy the land.

== Gameplay ==
Gameplay screenshot

The game action takes place in real time. Each weapon comes with a set of special attacks that are executed in fighting game style. The player can also summon spirits by firing a "Spirit Ball" at some object from the blue gem in his armlet; the exact spirit summoned depends on the object hit. The spirits can fight enemies, heal Leon, or help solve puzzles. Each has a different power, and Leon can wield short and long swords as well as bow and arrow. He is able to perform "combos" by means of combinations of the D-pad and the action buttons. His arrows can trigger switches.

The game is generally one-player, though a two-player mode can be accessed using a cheat code.

As with the original, the soundtrack was composed by Yuzo Koshiro.

== Release and reception ==
Reception

Aggregate score
Aggregator	Score
GameRankings	78% (4 reviews)

Review scores
Publication	Score
Edge	6/10
Electronic Gaming Monthly	6.75/10
Famitsu	8/10, 8/10, 7/10, 8/10
Game Informer	8.75/10
GameSpot	6.4/10
Next Generation	4/5
Sega Saturn Magazine	89%

The Legend of Oasis was released for the Sega Saturn on April 26, 1996 in Japan.

The Legend of Oasis received mostly positive reviews. Critics varied widely in their reasons for recommending the game, but the most common subjects of praise were the sharp graphics, controls, and blending of the action, puzzle, and RPG genres. The most common criticism was that it is too difficult to judge the difference in height between different platforms, though of the critics who had a more mixed response to the game, Electronic Gaming Monthly's Dan Hsu said his chief complaint was that the puzzles are too difficult, and GameSpot's Jeff Gerstmann said the game is enjoyable but not original enough (compared to its predecessor, Beyond Oasis) to justify its appearance on the Saturn platform. GamePro's Scary Larry remarked: "Though somewhat juvenile, this smooth-moving and colorful action RPG is engaging and enjoyable." Ed Lawrence of Sega Saturn Magazine found the game's longevity to be its strongest point, concluding: "It can't be said that Thor is an essential purchase, as it's currently overshadowed by a few corking bona fide classics, but if you like to see value-for-money from your games, Thor is definitely a title you should check out." Next Generation held that it "manages to expand upon the original formula cosmetically while still offering all the great action-adventure elements that made the first game a winner." In 1998, Saturn Power rated the game 97th on their Top 100 Sega Saturn Games, summarizing: "Story of Thor 2 apes Nintendo's Zelda 3 all the way, without capturing what made it such a classic. It's still as close to Zelda as you'll get on a Sega machine, though."
