= Dragon Knight (video game series) =

Japanese video game series

Dragon Knight (ドラゴンナイト, Doragon Naito) is an eroge/role-playing video game series by the game company ELF. There are four Dragon Knight games released between 1989 and 1997. There is also a hentai OVA series based on it, as well as some other media including audio CDs, novels and comic books. Dragon Knight is set in a sword and sorcery setting and mostly tell the story of Yamato Takeru (no relation with the historical figure of Yamato Takeru), a wayward young swordsman dedicated to saving damsels and fighting evil.

== Game series ==
- Dragon Knight (1989)
- Dragon Knight II (1990)
- Dragon Knight III (Knights of Xentar) (1991)
- Dragon Knight 4 (1994)
- Dragon Knight V (2017) - an online-only revival/sequel, which was developed by DMM Games without ELF Corporation's input. It was released as a browser-based gacha title. The service ended in 2018.

An unreleased remake of Words Worth was planned to be released for the Sega Saturn in 1997 as a Dragon Knight game; it is also advertised within Nonomura Byouin no Hitobito. The characters from both series finally met in Dragon Knight V.

== Anime series ==
- Dragon Knight
- Cover of Dragon Knight: Another Knight on the Town

ドラゴンナイト (Doragon Naito)
- Original video animation
- Directed by: Jun Fukuta
- Produced by: Yukio Kakei
- Written by: Kinuyo Nozaki
- Music by: Hiroshi Taguchi
- Studio: Just
- Released: September 1991
- Runtime: 31 minutes
- Original video animation

Dragon Knight: Another Knight on the Town
- Directed by: Kaoru Toyooka
- Produced by: Yuudai Amachi; Kenji Toyota
- Written by: Rou Hatta
- Music by: Torsten Rasch
- Studio: Triple X
- Released: February 25, 1995
- Original video animation

Dragon Knight: The Wheel of Time
- Directed by: Hiromichi Matano
- Produced by: Kouichi Amagi; Yuutarou Mochizuki
- Written by: Akira Takano
- Music by: Harukichi Yamamoto
- Studio: Dangun Pictures
- Released: November 27, 1998 – August 27, 1999
- Episodes: 4

=== Dragon Knight ===
The first OVA was released by Polystar on VHS and LD in September 1991. Soft Cel Pictures sold the English version in the VHS format. It was also re-released on DVD in 2003. The anime is based on the first game and its cast includes Yasunori Matsumoto as Takeru and Yūko Mizutani as Luna.

=== Dragon Knight Gaiden ===
Dragon Knight Gaiden (ドラゴンナイト外伝) was released on VHS and LD in 1995, distributed by Taki Corporation. It was re-released in 1999 on VHS, then in 2000 in the VHS and DVD formats ("Sexual Grade Up Edition"), all distributed by FiveWays under the Honnybit brand (BOUKIDOU). Soft Cel sold the slightly censored English version as Dragon Knight: Another Knight on the Town. The cast includes Mitsuaki Madono as Yamato Takeru, Mikiko Kurihara as Jodis, Nina Kumagaya as Yurius, Yōko Sōmi as Shade, Hiroshi Naka as Runter and Kenichi Ogata as Renaldo. Character design is by Keiji Gotoh.

=== Dragon Knight: The Wheel of Time ===
Dragon Knight: The Wheel of Time is an adaptation of Dragon Knight 4 featuring the same characters. It is a four-part OVA that was originally released in Japan in 1998 and was in the United States on DVD in 2003. The cast includes Kappei Yamaguchi as Kakeru, Toshiyuki Morikawa as Eto and Kaneto Shiozawa as Lucifon.

== See also ==
- Words Worth
