= Dragon Knight (video game) =

1989 video game

- Developers: ELF Corporation; NEC Avenue (PC Engine)
- Publishers: ELF Corporation (PC-88, PC-98, X68000, MSX); NEC Avenue (PC Engine)
- Designer: Masato Hiruta
- Series: Dragon Knight
- Platforms: MSX, PC-88, PC-98, X68000, TurboGrafx-16 (PC Engine)
- Release: 1989-11-01 (PC88, PC98, X68k, MSX); 1995-03-31 (PCE)
- Genres: Eroge, dungeon crawler
- Mode: Single-player

Dragon Knight (Note: Japanese: ドラゴンナイト, Hepburn: Doragon Naito) is a fantasy-themed eroge role-playing video game and the original entry in the Dragon Knight franchise originally developed and published by ELF Corporation in 1989. Its remake was created by NEC Avenue in 1995. Both versions were released only in Japan. The game was adapted into an OVA in 1991 and was followed by Dragon Knight II in 1990.

== Gameplay ==
Exploration in the 1995 remake

Gameplay-wise, Dragon Knight is a dungeon crawler typical for its era (similar to that of early Wizardry games). The exploration and combat are shown from the first-person perspective using a 2D engine, combat in the game is turn-based and enemies are encountered randomly (a similar system was also used in the first sequel). With each new floor, the mazes becomes more sophisticated (in the remake there is a helpful mini-map with grid coordinates), and enemies are getting stronger. The fights in the first game are difficult and unbalanced. The protagonist can attack, defend, and use spells and items to fight monsters (up to six (three in the remake) at once).

== Plot ==
In the kingdom of Strawberry Fields, a place inhabited only by women, the Goddess' Tower has protected the land and its people for generations. Then one day, the monstrous Dragon Knights, corrupted by evil and led by the demon Gazelbaan (ゲイゼルバーン, Geizerubān), descended upon the tower, and the people of Strawberry Fields suddenly find themselves threatened by his army of monsters, who have turned the goddess Aquarina (アクァーリナー, Akwārinā) to stone and captured the warrior women, demanding the six gems that are a source of magical power of the goddess to be delivered to them or else they would kill their hostages. Answering the plea for help from village girl Luna (ルナ, Runa; voiced by Noriko Hidaka), the young warrior and traveler Yamato Takeru (ヤマト・タケル; voiced by Akira Kamiya) takes them on. Luna's mother is voiced by Rei Sakuma. On each floor of the Tower there are captured females for Takeru to rescue from rapists.

== Release ==
The game was originally released in 1989 for the PC-88, PC-98 and MSX, followed by the X68000 version in 1990. The 1995 remake Dragon Knight & Graffiti for the PC Engine was developed and released by NEC Avenue.

Two soundtracks: Dragon Knight: Treasure King of Water Chapter (Note: ドラゴンナイト～水の宝王篇～, Doragon Naito ~Mizu no Hōō-hen~) and PC Engine World—Dragon Knight & Graffiti were released in Japan by Datam Polystar in 1990 and by NEC Avenue (distributed by Nippon Columbia) in 1995, respectively. An OVA anime adaptation was released by Polystar on the VHS and LD in 1991. Soft Cel Pictures distributed the English version in the VHS format. It was also re-released on DVD in 2003. The cast included Yasunori Matsumoto as Takeru and Yūko Mizutani as Luna.

== Reception ==
On release, Famicom Tsūshin scored the PC Engine remake a 22 out of 40, also giving it an 8 out of 10 in their Reader Cross Review.
