= Feda: The Emblem of Justice =

1994 video game

- Packaging for the Super Famicom version.
- Developer: Max Entertainment
- Publisher: Yanoman
- Director: Yoshitaka Tamaki
- Composer: Hidehiko Enomoto
- Platforms: Super Famicom, Sega Saturn
- Release: Super Famicom: JP: October 28, 1994; Sega Saturn: JP: May 24, 1996
- Genre: Tactical role-playing game
- Mode: Single-player

Feda: The Emblem of Justice (Note: Feda: The Emblem of Justice (フェーダ エンブレム・オブ・ジャスティス)) is a tactical role playing game developed by Max Entertainment and published by Yanoman Games that was originally released for the Super Famicom in 1994. The game centers on two soldiers forced to fight against the now-corrupted empire they used to serve. A version for the Sega Saturn, titled Feda Remake!, was released in 1996. Both versions were released exclusively in Japan.

== Gameplay ==
A strange bipedal creature is attacking the player.

Feda is a tactical role playing game composed of two primary play modes: exploration and battles. During an exploration stage, the player explore towns and other locations and visit shops and houses. When the player enters the overworld, the game becomes turn based and the player can move units to confront enemies. Battles are activated when the player and an enemy unit occupy the same area or in scripted event. Feda feature cinematic battle scenes similar to the Shining Force series. Depending on which character the player uses to act, the scene shows him in full picture or just a part of the character (unlike in Shining Force where the player always just sees his character from behind and the enemy in front of him). During battles, the screen switches from the player's unit to the enemy.

=== Alignment ===
A distinguishing feature in Feda is that the player's alignment can be chosen - the player can fight for law or chaos. This depends on how he finishes a battle, like always just killing everyone makes him become chaos, but trying to find an alternative peaceful way of winning gives him law points. Deciding which way the player chooses also decides which characters that he gets. Beside his neutral characters whose always stay in the player's party, he can get different characters on law and chaos side. But changing the side will make them leave his party. The alignment system is done in ranked emblems - a neutral one and four chaos and four law ones, highest of them called Fedayenn Goddess of Justice.

=== Battle ===
Battles take place on a square grid where each unit occupies a single square. Battle is turn-based where during a character's turn, they can move a certain amount of squares, they may then perform an action such as attack or use items. When an attack action is used it goes into a fight animation and tells the player how much damage was given/received.

== Reception ==
On release, Famicom Tsūshin scored the game a 26 out of 40.

== Sequel ==
A sequel, titled Feda 2: White Surge the Platoon, was released for the PlayStation on April 18, 1997.
