= ELF Corporation =

Japanese eroge studio

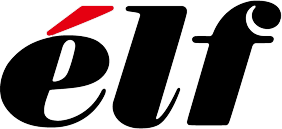
- ELF Corporation logo
- Industry: Video games
- Founded: April 27, 1989
- Defunct: October 2015
- Headquarters: Tokyo, Japan
- Parent: Kirara (1988-1989)
- Website: www.elf-game.co.jp

ELF Corporation (株式会社エルフ, Kabushiki-gaisha Erufu), stylized as élf, was a Japanese eroge studio. One of its most popular games is Dōkyūsei, a pioneering dating sim, which has had a sequel and been turned into adult OVA series. The character design of the main villains from the -saku series is the company mascot. They are also known for role-playing video games such as the Dragon Knight series and visual novel adventure games such as YU-NO. Many ELF games had been turned into adult OVA series. Three of ELF game series had even been turned into TV anime series: Elf-ban Kakyūsei, Raimuiro Senkitan and YU-NO.

Elf was founded on April 27, 1989 in Tokyo. As of 2004, the CEO is Atsushi Shimoda (下田篤). EFC, the ELF Fan Club (エルフFC), has an active membership. There is a project that aims at recreating the game engine for other platforms. After 27 years, it was announced in October 2015 that the company was closing for business. Some of their games were re-released by DMM Games.

== Video games ==
Title	Platform(s)	Release date
Doki Doki! Shutter Chance	PC-8800 series	December 8, 1988
Doki Doki! Shutter Chance	PC-9800 series	December 8, 1988
Private School	PC-8800 series	March 13, 1989
Private School	PC-9800 series	April 19, 1989
Private School	MSX	April 19, 1989
Angel Hearts	PC-9800 series	June 20, 1989
Angel Hearts	PC-8800 series	June 20, 1989
Pinky Ponky	PC-9800 series	July 13, 1989
Pinky Ponky	PC-8800 series	August 11, 1989
Pinky Ponky	MSX	August 1989
Pinky Ponky	X68000	August 30, 1990
RUNRUN Kyosokyoku	PC-9800 series	September 15, 1989
RUNRUN Kyosokyoku	PC-8800 series	September 15, 1989
Dragon Knight	X68000	November 1, 1989
Dragon Knight	PC-8800 series	November 17, 1989
Dragon Knight	PC-9800 series	November 29, 1989
Dragon Knight	MSX	January 19, 1990
Foxy	PC-9800 series	February 6, 1990
Foxy	PC-8800 series	March 1990
Foxy	MSX	May 17, 1990
Ray-Gun	PC-9800 series	May 15, 1990
Ray-Gun	PC-8800 series	September 1990
Ray-Gun	X68000	December 12, 1990
Ray-Gun	MSX	April 11, 1991
De-Ja	PC-9800 series	June 15, 1990
De-Ja	DOS/V	June 15, 1990
De-Ja	PC-8800 series	June 1990
De-Ja	X68000	December 12, 1990
De-Ja	MSX	April 11, 1991
Dragon Knight II	PC-9800 series	November 30, 1990
Dragon Knight II	PC-8800 series	December 1990
Dragon Knight II	MSX	January 31, 1991
Dragon Knight II	X68000	February 28, 1991
Foxy 2	PC-9800 series	April 4, 1991
Foxy 2	X68000	April 25, 1991
Él	PC-9800 series	June 23, 1991
Él	X68000	July 17, 1991
Él	FM Towns	November 1991
Él	MSX	February 17, 1992
Él	Windows (95)	September 29, 2000
Shangrlia	PC-9800 series	August 28, 1991
Shangrlia	X68000	September 26, 1991
Shangrlia	FM Towns	January 17, 1992
Dragon Knight 3	DOS/V	July 6, 1991
Dragon Knight 3	PC-9800 series	December 14, 1991
Dragon Knight 3	X68000	January 31, 1992
Dragon Knight 3	FM Towns	February 1992
Tenshin Ranma	PC-9800 series	March 18, 1992
Tenshin Ranma	X68000	April 18, 1992
Tenshin Ranma	FM Towns	May 1992
De-Ja 2	PC-9800 series	June 25, 1992
De-Ja 2	DOS/V	June 25, 1992
De-Ja 2	X68000	July 30, 1992
De-Ja 2	FM Towns	August 1992
Jan Jaku Jan	PC-9800 series	November 13, 1992
Jan Jaku Jan	X68000	December 24, 1992
Jan Jaku Jan	FM Towns	January 12, 1993
Dōkyūsei	PC-9800 series	December 17, 1992
Dōkyūsei	DOS/V	December 17, 1992
Dōkyūsei	X68000	December 17, 1992
Dōkyūsei	FM Towns	December 17, 1992
Dōkyūsei	Windows (95)	August 27, 1999
Dōkyūsei	Windows (Digital)	March 1, 2007
Metal Eye	PC-9800 series	April 28, 1993
Metal Eye	X68000	May 28, 1993
Metal Eye	FM Towns	June 30, 1993
Words Worth	PC-9800 series	July 22, 1993
Words Worth	X68000	August 27, 1993
Words Worth	FM Towns	September 30, 1993
Words Worth	Windows (95)	March 25, 1999
Words Worth	Windows (XP)	October 29, 2004
Shangrlia 2	PC-9800 series	September 30, 1993
Shangrlia 2	X68000	October 28, 1993
Shangrlia 2	FM Towns	November 27, 1993
Dragon Knight 4	PC-9800 series	February 25, 1994
Dragon Knight 4	X68000	March 31, 1994
Dragon Knight 4	FM Towns	April 28, 1994
Dragon Knight 4	Windows	June 29, 2007
Metal Eye 2	PC-9800 series	August 31, 1994
Metal Eye 2	FM Towns	September 30, 1994
Dōkyūsei 2	PC-9800 series	January 31, 1995
Dōkyūsei 2	FM Towns	February 1995
Dōkyūsei 2	DOS/V	1995
Dōkyūsei 2	Windows	August 29, 1997
Isaku	PC-9800 series	August 25, 1995
Isaku	DOS/V	August 25, 1995
Isaku	Windows	May 30, 1997
Isaku	Macintosh	March 1, 2000
Kakyūsei	PC-9800 series	June 7, 1996
Kakyūsei	Sega Saturn	April 25, 1997
Kakyūsei	Windows	June 26, 1998
Nonomura Byōin no Hitobito	Sega Saturn	April 27, 1996
Nonomura Byōin no Hitobito	Windows	September 27, 1996
YU-NO: A girl who chants love at the bound of this world	PC-9800 series	December 26, 1996
YU-NO: A girl who chants love at the bound of this world	Sega Saturn	December 4, 1997
Kawarazaki-ke no Ichizoku	Windows	October 1, 1997
Shūsaku	Windows	March 27, 1998
Shūsaku	Macintosh	March 27, 1998
Kakyūsei Screen Saver Collection	Windows	July 24, 1998
Refrain Blue	Windows	November 26, 1999
Koi Hime	Windows	December 24, 1999
Elf All-Stars Datsui Jan	Windows	March 30, 2000
Kisaku	Windows	January 30, 2001
Jankyūsei	Game Boy Color	April 27, 2001
Ashita no Yukinojō	Windows	August 31, 2001
Elf All-Stars Datsui Jan 2	Windows	November 22, 2001
Hyakki	Windows	March 29, 2002
Masaru Ashita no Yukinojō 2	Windows	September 27, 2002
Raimuiro Senkitan	Windows	December 13, 2002
Kawarazaki-ke no Ichizoku 2	Windows	June 6, 2003
Raimuiro Senkitan 2	Windows	August 29, 2003
Shin Mikagura Shōjo Tanteidan	Windows	December 26, 2003
Kakyūsei 2	Windows	August 27, 2004
Hana to Hebi	Windows	August 5, 2005
AV King	Windows	January 27, 2006
Elf All-Stars Datsui Jan 3	Windows	March 31, 2006
Biniku no Kaori	Windows	March 28, 2008
Biniku no Kaori Naked	Windows	March 26, 2010
Ningen Debris	Windows	November 26, 2010
Elf in Wonderland	Windows	August 12, 2011
Boku no Kanojo wa Gaten-kei/ Kanojo ga Shita Koto, Boku ga Sareta Koto/ Kyonyūzuma Kanzen Hokaku Keikaku/ Boku no Tsuma ga Aitsu ni Netoraremashita	Windows	December 8, 2011
Elf in Wonderland 2	Windows	July 19, 2012
Maro no Kanja wa Gatenkei	Windows	April 25, 2013
Maro no Kanja wa Gatenkei 2	Windows	August 8, 2013
Boku no Kanojo wa Gatenkei: Visual Lineup	Windows	August 27, 2015
Maro no Kanja wa Gatenkei 3: Kanketsuhen	Windows	October 15, 2015

Yellow Vip (Windows)

Title	Release date
Wakazuma Mangekyō	February 25, 2005
Otto no Mae de Okasarete	July 28, 2006

=== Silky's ===
Silky's is a game studio whose games are mostly distributed by ELF, and several of which have been made into OAVs.

- Ai Shimai 愛姉妹～二人の果実～ [ja] (also called Immoral Sisters: Two Immature Fruits)
  - Ai Shimai Tsubomi 愛姉妹・蕾 ...汚してください (also called Immoral Sisters - Bloom ...Please Deflower and Aishimai 2)
  - Ai Shimai Docchi ni Suru no!! 愛姉妹 どっちにするの!!
- BE-YOND ビ・ヨンド 黒大将に見られてる
- Birthdays バース・デイズ
  - Valentine Kiss Birthdays 2 バレンタイン・キッス 〜バースデイズ2〜
- Dorei Kaigo 奴隷介護
- Flutter of Birds flutter of birds ～鳥達の羽ばたき～ (also called Virgin Touch)
  - Flutter of Birds 2 flutter of birds II 天使たちの翼 (also called Flutter of Birds 2: Wings of an Angel)
- Itoshi no Kotodama 愛しの言霊
- Jokei Kazoku 女系家族
- Mobius Roid Möbius Roid メビウスロイド (also called Moebius Roid)
- Nikutai Ten'i 肉体転移 (also called Teni)
- Shitai o Arau 肢体を洗う (also called Slave Nurse)
- Sweet Hanjuku na Tenshi-tachi sweet ～半熟な天使たち～ (also called Sweet: Semi-Matured Angel)

== See also ==
- Bishōjo game
- List of Japanese erotic video games
- List of hentai authors
- Ryu Umemoto
