= Dragon Knight 4 =

1994 video game

- Developer: ELF Corporation (Note: Ported to Super Famicom and PlayStation by Banpresto, PC-FX by NEC Avenue)
- Publisher: ELF Corporation (Note: MS-DOS version was published by Game Box, Super Famicom and PlayStation versions were published by Banpresto, and PC-FX version was published by NEC Interchannel)
- Producer: Masato Hiruta
- Designer: Masato Hiruta
- Programmer: Atsushi Kanao
- Artist: Masaki Takei
- Composers: Masaki Sugō; Tsuyoshi Fukutomi; Yōichi Shimizu
- Series: Dragon Knight
- Platforms: PC-98, X68000, FM Towns, MS-DOS, Super Famicom, PlayStation, PC-FX, Microsoft Windows
- Release: February 25, 1994: PC-98; JP: February 25, 1994 X68000; JP: March 31, 1994 FM Towns; JP: April 28, 1994 DOS; TW: April 10, 1996; KOR: October 1997 Super Famicom; JP: December 27, 1996 PlayStation; JP: February 7, 1997 PC-FX; JP: March 28, 1997 Windows; JP: June 29, 2007
- Genres: Eroge, tactical role-playing
- Mode: Single-player

Dragon Knight 4 (Note: Japanese: ドラゴンナイト4, Hepburn: Doragon Naito Fō) is a role-playing video game developed by ELF Corporation and released only in Japan for several platforms between 1994 and 1997. In 1994, the game first became available for PC MS-DOS, NEC PC-9801 and X68000, with a censored version ported to the Super Nintendo Entertainment System in 1996 and later to the PC-FX and PlayStation in 1997. It was also adapted into illustrated novels and an anime miniseries.

Dragon Knight 4 is a continuation of the Dragon Knight series, and a sequel to Knights of Xentar. Dragon Knight 4 has a new protagonist, Kakeru, the son of Takeru from the previous games.

== Gameplay ==
The game features a turn-based battle system, with the player in control of up to eight additional characters. Allies and enemies are both separated into statistically distinct classes: swordsmen, archers and sorcerers, with certain armour and weaponry being appropriate to each.

== Plot ==
The central character of Dragon Knight 4 is Kakeru (カケル) (voiced by Megumi Ogata), the son of Yamato Takeru, the protagonist of the earlier games in the series, and the sorceress Luna. At the outset, the player is informed of the wizard Lushifon's plot to destroy civilization and must guide Kakeru through a number of battles to defeat Lushifon.

== Release ==
The original DOS, FM Towns and PC-98 versions of the game feature erotic scenes. The versions for the SNES, PC-FX and PlayStation published by Banpresto removed these aspects. A Windows remake brought the game into the third dimension and brought back the erotic scenes.

=== Other media ===
The original soundtrack Dragon Knight 4 Complete Music File was released by NEC Avenue. Media Works also published a three-volume manga by Togashi in 1997–1999.

Two different illustrated novelization were published. A three-volume novel was written by Rei Marimura, illustrated by Masaki Takei, and released by Wani Books in 1994–1995. The second, two-volume novel was written by Youko Kagura, illustrated also by Masaki Takei, and released by Kill Time Communication in 2007–2008.

A two-volume anime OVA of two episodes each was produced by Dangun Pictures and released by Pink Pineapple in 1998–1999.

== Reception ==
Reception

Review scores
Publication	Score
Consoles +	(PS) 85%
Famitsu	(SFC) 6/10, 5/10, 6/10, 6/10 (PS) 23/40
RPGFan	(PS) 68/100
Dengeki PlayStation	(PS) 70/100, 70/100, 75/100, 75/100
Dokan	6/10

Reviewing the Super Famicom port, the four reviewers from Famitsu dismissed the game with comments rannging from the story being monotonous, the combat having nearly no strategy with one reviewer saying it had all the cliches of the bad qualities of a PC game.

Dragon Knight 4 received average reception from critics who reviewed it as an import title. According to Famitsu, the PlayStation release sold 15,351 copies in its first week on the market. The PlayStation version sold a total of 22,683 copies during its lifetime in Japan. Japanese video game magazine PCpress reported that the Microsoft Windows release ranked tenth in terms of domestic PC game sales in Japan.

German publication AnimaniA highlighted the game's atmosphere, appealing character designs, and character development throughout the plot, but found some erotic scenes unpleasant and criticized aspects such as required action commands not being able to be executed in later areas. Retro Gamer named it one of the ten best games for PC-FX, commenting that the game has attractive graphics, a moderately deep and engaging battle system, and a decent storyline. Hardcore Gaming 101's Diogo Martins wrote that "Dragon Knight 4 is a great example of an erotic game that is actually good, and one that a lot of SRPG fans would most likely enjoy".
