= Shining Blade =

2012 tactical role-playing video game

- Developer(s): Media.Vision
- Publisher(s): Sega
- Artist(s): Character Designer; Tony Taka
- Series: Shining
- Platform(s): PlayStation Portable
- Release: JP: March 15, 2012
- Genre(s): Tactical role-playing game
- Mode(s): Single-player

Shining Blade (シャイニング・ブレイド, Shainingu Bureido) is a tactical role-playing game developed and published by Sega for the PlayStation Portable. It is the fourth Shining game with characters designed by Tony Taka, the other three being Shining Tears, Shining Wind and Shining Hearts. Shining Blade was released in Japan on March 15, 2012.

== Gameplay ==
The game's battle system is called "Concerto", and is a strategic real time battle system similar to the ones found in Sakura Wars and Valkyria Chronicles. The player make use of swords, bows and magic in a battle system that places importance on character cooperation—hence the name "Concerto". The player forms a party of up to five for battle. The game will have damage based on character position, and items collected upon defeating enemies.

The songstresses are special members of the player's battle party. By performing their magic song, they can achieve various effects on battle—blocking enemies from moving, increasing characters' move count, making hasten the party's pace. Some songs can even be used for attack. Using the songs requires Mana Energy.

The game also has inter-character relationships. Depending on the player's selections during event scenes, movements and usage of group skills during battle, the characters' relationships will change.

== Plot ==
=== Story ===
Within the Dragonia Empire, a plan to revive the leader of the Dark Dragon by sapping spirit energy from the land starts to unfold. With giant dragons rampaging throughout the land and the world engulfed in chaos, all hope has turned to the retrieval of the mysterious Shining Blade. And thus, a soul blader is given the task to obtain the legendary blade and find Loreley, the songstress who sings the Song of Mana.

=== Characters ===
- Rage (レイジ, Reiji) Voiced by: Sōichirō Hoshi: Main protagonist of the game. Rage is a great swordsman who comes from another world. He was given the task as the soul blader to find the legendary Shining Blade. Rage wields a soul blade named Yukihime, who is able to transform between a blade and human form at will because she's a Spirit. Depending on her emotional state, the form she takes as a sword will change.
- Altina (アルティナ, Arutina) Voiced by: Marina Inoue: Princess of the kingdom of the forest, Fontina and the spirit protector of the sacred Silver Forest of the elves. After finding Rage drifted ashore, she decided to accompany him on his quest. Altina is a proper princess bound by the strict laws of the elves. She uses bow and arrows in combat.
- Fenrir (フェンリル, Fenriru) Voiced by: Tetsu Inada: The second-in-command of the production unit of the Valeria Liberation Front, a faction that opposes the Dragonia Empire. Fenrir is a true veteran of the battlefield with a unique leadership and is capable of providing flexible support to the unit. He is well-trusted and strongly relied upon.
- Roselinde (ローゼリンデ, Rōzerinde) Voiced by: Houko Kuwashima: The empire's priestess. Because of the Dark Dragon's resurrection, she has attracted many apparitions filled with negative emotions.
- Fafner (ファフナー, Fafunā) Voiced by: Akira Ishida: A knight of the empire and Roselinde's escort. He is able to use the Crystal Sword with ease. He is actually a man named Kaito.
- Sleipnir (スレイプニル, Sureipuniru) Voiced by: Nobutoshi Canna: A horseman who was revived by the power of the empire from the desert and one of the Dark Dragon's henchman.
- Yukihime (ユキヒメ) Voiced by: Ryōko Shiraishi
- Misty (ミスティ) Voiced by: Tamura Yukari
- Elmina (エルミナ) Voiced by: Saori Hayami
- Sakuya (サクヤ) Voiced by: Nana Mizuki
- Touka Kureha (呉羽 冬華) Voiced by: Yui Horie

A Schoolgirl Archer from the returning video game Shining Wind while fighting with Sleipnir in the desert.

- Kanon Seena (椎名 夏音) Voiced by: Nana Mizuki

Touka's close friend was a Fencer from the Shining Wind while containing against Sleipnir in the desert.

- Ein Xecty (ゼクティ・アイン) Voiced by Houko Kuwashima

One of the Demonic Alchemy Empire Baelgard (Elven Kingdom Astraea) have been revived as a schoolgirl of St Luminious High School who wields a Katana instead of her Elf sword while battling Sleipnir in the desert.
