= Tetsu Inada =

Japanese voice actor (born 1972)

- 稲田 徹
- Born: July 1, 1972 (age 54); Hachiōji, Tokyo, Japan
- Other names: Tetuso Imada (今田鉄男); Bansai-banto (番菜判斗); Big Bang Heita (ビッグバン平太); Denemon Iguchi (居口伝衛門); Ichiyama Misheru (ミシェル市山); Hyodo Emeriyaenko (エメリヤーエンコ兵頭)
- Occupation: Voice actor
- Years active: 1994–present
- Agent: Aoni Production
- Notable work: My Hero Academia as Enji Todoroki; Dragon Ball Kai as Nappa; Bleach as Sajin Komamura; Tokusou Sentai Dekaranger as Doggie Kruger; Kill la Kill as Ira Gamagoori; SSSS.Gridman as Alexis Kerib; Ultraman Nexus as Dark Faust; Zipang as Yōsuke Kadomatsu
- Height: 184 cm (6 ft 0 in)

Tetsu Inada (稲田 徹, Inada Tetsu; born July 1, 1972) is a Japanese voice actor affiliated with Aoni Production. Among his best known roles are the voice of main character Yōsuke Kadomatsu Zipang.

== Filmography ==
=== Anime ===
List of voice performances in anime
Year	Title	Role	Notes	Source
1992	Crayon Shin-chan	Giant, Sumo wrestler, Shashin-yasa, Baked sweet potato shopowner		
1996	Dragon Ball GT	Luud, Bisu, Hammer, Android 19, others		
1997	Doctor Slump	Great caramelman FX		
1998	Yu-Gi-Oh!	Jonouchi's father, Teacher		
1998	Android Ana Maico 2010	Pizaya		
1998	DT Eightron	Butler		
1999	Getter Robo Armageddon	Winter Clothed Man	OVA Vol. 5	
1999	Shin Hakkenden	Sai		
1999	Turn A Gundam	Harry Ord		
1999	One Piece	Abi's Father, Bomba, Brogy, Dr. Potsun, Gorilla, Isshi 20, Jesus Burgess, Lake, Lapahn, Million, Mr. 1/Daz Bones, Patty, Purin Purin, Richie, Ripper (ep 68), Tilestone, additional voices		
1999	Blue Gender	Residents, Executive, Korean Man		
1999	Shūkan Storyland	Masato		
2000	Shinzo	Troll, Hito Furai		
2000	Brigadoon: Marin & Melan	Keiji Wakai		
2000	Vandread	Bridge crew		
2000	Legendary Gambler Tetsuya	Isochi		
2000	Inuyasha	Mukotsu, Manten		
2001	Tales of Eternia the animation	Irfit, Tenshu Berukamirazu		
2001	Star Ocean EX	Bisque		
2001	Z.O.E. Dolores, I	Driver, Yan		
2001	ja:まみむめ★もがちょ	Dottosu, Arashiman G		
2001	s-CRY-ed	Leader		
2001	Crush Gear Turbo	Godmama		
2001	Rave Master	Marco Berunju, Gemma		
2002	Ultimate Muscle: The Kinnikuman Legacy	Anaconda, Dead Signal, Ikemen Muscle, Maxman, Samu		
2002	Kanon	Ishibashi-sensei	2002 version	
2002	Daigunder	Brian, Daigaraion		
2002	Lightning Attack Express ja:電光超特急ヒカリアン	E4 power, Doctor, Minayo's father, Chijinju Sphinx, Fujin Beast Nazca		
2002	Atashin'chi	PE Teacher		
2002	Monkey Typhoon	Garutsu		
2002	Bomberman Jetters	Oyabon		
2002	Kiddy Grade	A-ou		
2002	Weiβ Kreuz Gluhen	Masato Kirishima		
2003	Cromartie High School	Akira Maeda		
2003	Machine Robo Rescue	Masayoshi Utada, Anao, Takezo Okano		
2003	Crush Gear Nitro	Tetsuo Shiroyanagi		
2003	Air Master	Gouda		
2003	Firestorm	Robert, Sid		
2003	Croket!	Café latte		
2003	Rockman.EXE Axess	SwordMan (Red)		
2003	Bobobo-bo Bo-bobo	Director		
2004	Yumeria	Ishikari-sensei		
2004	Interlude	Master		
2004	ja:絢爛舞踏祭 ザ・マーズ・デイブレイク	Rich de Bonuru		
2004	The Mars Daybreak	Rich		
2004	Dan Doh!!	Takuya Akano		
2004	Sgt. Frog	Robopyon		
2004	Burst Angel	Bailan Spy	Ep. 9	
2004	Ragnarok the Animation	Priest, bandit leader		
2004	Ultimate Muscle	Ikemen Muscle		
2004	Samurai Champloo	Chinpara		
2004	Samurai 7	Gorobei Katayama		
2004	Agatha Christie's Great Detectives Poirot and Marple	Elsa's brother	Ep. 2	
2004	Onmyō Taisenki	Tsubaki no gorouza, Shusui no namazubou 椿のゴロウザ / 秋水のナマズボウ		
2004	Rockman.EXE Stream	SwordMan (Red)		
2004	Gankutsuou: The Count of Monte Cristo	Maximilien Morrel		
2004	Yu-Gi-Oh! GX	Mike		
2004	Zipang	Yosuke Kadomatsu		
2005	Xenosaga: The Animation	Helmer		
2005	Air	Soldier	Ep. 9	
2005–2007	Buzzer Beater series	Ivan, Doctor		
2005–2011	Bleach	Sajin Komamura		
2005–2006	Tsubasa: Reservoir Chronicle series	Kurogane		
2005	Trinity Blood	Brother Petros		
2005	ja:新釈 眞田十勇士	Hanawa Dan uemon Naoyuki 塙団右衛門直之		
2005	Kamichu!	Dave		
2005	Akahori Gedou Hour Rabuge	Arimasu Kanenara, Chairman		
2005	Guyver: The Bio-Boosted Armor	Aptom		
2005	Gunparade March	Ryoma Taniguchi		
2005	Blood+	McCoy		
2005	Lamune	Nobunaga		
2005	Gaiking: Legend of Daiku-Maryu	Boss		
2006	Amaenaide yo!! Katsu!!	Shodai-san		
2006	Crash B-Daman	Ichibee Sanada		
2006	Nerima Daikon Brothers	Donabenabe		
2006	Ayakashi: Samurai Horror Tales	Odajima		
2006	Rec	Ichi Aomori		
2006	Futagohime Gyu! ja:ふしぎ星の☆ふたご姫 Gyu!	Hyu cha		
2006	School Rumble: Second Semester	Gorou		
2006	Glass Fleet	Uruguzane		
2006	Witchblade	Sakuma		
2006	Yume Tsukai	Masafumi Nakaoka		
2006	Binbō Shimai Monogatari	Fukubiki-sho no ojisan 福引所のおじさん		
2006	Powerpuff Girls Z	Manga artist		
2006	Government Crime Investigation Agent Zaizen Jotaro ja:内閣権力犯罪強制取締官 財前丈太郎	Naoto Todo		
2006	Le Chevalier D'Eon	King Louis XV		
2006	Shooting Star Rockman	Juro Ogami		
2006	Project GA ja:ギャラクシーエンジェる〜ん	Sansa Kanesaka		
2006	D.Gray-man	Richard	Ep. 29	
2006	Buso Renkin	Saruwatari	Ep. 1	
2006	Super Robot Wars Original Generation: Divine Wars	Elzam V. Branstein		
2006	Kanon	Ishibashi-sensei	2006 version	
2006	Hell Girl: Two Mirrors	Michirou Itou		
2006	Shooting Star Rockman	Juro Onoue		
2006	Tokyo Tribe 2	Penny's store manager, Tsutchi		
2007	Deltora Quest	Khan troops captain		
2007	Les Misérables: Shōjo Cosette	Gurumeru		
2007	GeGeGe no Kitaro	Hashira Gyaku, Yamashita-sensei, Katasharin, Hashimoto	5th TV series	
2007	El Cazador de la Bruja	Carlos		
2007	Bakugan Battle Brawlers	Fafnir		
2007	Moonlight Mile: Touch down	Federico, Brenner		
2007	Bamboo Blade	Kenzaburo Ishibashi, Death Armor		
2007	Neuro: Supernatural Detective	Rijin Maguri		
2007	Mobile Suit Gundam 00	Police informer, Kokuten General-Secretary		
2007	Hatara Kizzu Maihamu Gumi	Doburi		
2008	Hakaba Kitaro 墓場鬼太郎	Teacher		
2008	Yu-Gi-Oh! 5D's	Hideo Izayoi		
2008	Allison & Lillia	Village chief		
2008	Macross Frontier	Kiichiro Tokugawa, Chunen Ogotai		
2008	To Love-Ru	Pikari's father		
2008	Monochrome Factor	Taneda		
2008	Uchi no Sanshimai	A-san		
2008	Golgo 13	Baby Luciano, Kimmel		
2008	Sands of Destruction	Ice cream seller		
2008	Blade of the Immortal	Kenei Sumino 隅乃軒栄		
2008	Battle Spirits: Shounen Toppa Bashin	Physician		
2008	Quiz Magic Academy: The Animation	Saunders	OVA	
2008	Corpse Princess	Hikaru's Father	Ep. 2	
2008	Legends of the Dark King	Kio Goram		
2008	Linebarrels of Iron	Takuro Sawatari		
2008	Ga-Rei: Zero	Kouji Iwahata		
2008	Inazuma Eleven	Shinzo Hirai, Kito's father, Kakuma Osho, Koichi (備流田光一), Eiji Sumizu, Kantoku Director		
2008	Mobile Suit Gundam 00 second season	Barack Jinin		
2008	Vampire Knight Guilty	Senri's uncle		
2008	Tytania	Doorman		
2008	Negi Bozu no Asataro ja:ねぎぼうずのあさたろう	Idaten no sahei, Seki Kuromame, Tomato no Figo, Wakai Rokyuuemon		
2009	Examurai Sengoku ja:エグザムライ戦国	Hiro		
2009	Slayers Evolution-R	Thief		
2009	Sora o Miageru Shōjo no Hitomi ni Utsuru Sekai	Gas		
2009	Dungeon Fighter Online	Kazefu		
2009	Dragon Ball Z Kai	Nappa		
2009	Fullmetal Alchemist: Brotherhood	Roa		
2009	Sōten Kōro	Xiahou Yuan		
2009	Battle Spirits: Shounen Gekiha Dan ja:バトルスピリッツ 少年激覇ダン	Gouda		
2009	TO: Symbiotic Planet	Pilot	OVA（一般）	
2009	Anyamaru Tantei Kiruminzuu	Ken's father, Teizo Inomata		
2009	Kobato.	Ioryougi		
2009	Tamagotchi!	Hanabitchi		
2009	Kiddy Girl-and	A-ou		
2010	Quiz Magic Academy: The Animation 2	Saunders	OVA	
2010	Bakugan: Gundalian Invaders	Fafnir		
2010	Beyblade: Metal Masters	DJ Chuto		
2010	Lilpri	Aooni		
2010	Super Robot Wars Original Generation: The Inspector	Ratsel Feinschmecker		
2010	Fairy Tail	Brain/Zero, Ketsupuri Dango-bun, Lapointe		
2010	Coicent	Older brother		
2011	Rio: Rainbow Gate	Bull Hard		
2011	Cardfight!! Vanguard	Tetsu Shinjo		
2011	Little Battlers Experience	Tsunoba Osho		
2011	Nichijou	Manabu Takasaki		
2011	Tiger & Bunny	Paulie		
2011	We Without Wings	Karuma Itami		
2011	Beyblade: Metal Fury	DJ Chuto		
2011	Hyouge Mono	Ujinao Hojo		
2011	Sket Dance	Tetsu, Shitenno		
2011	The World God Only Knows	Wrestler Tagawa	season 2	
2011	Inazuma Eleven Go	Osho Kakuma, Shinzo Hirai		
2011	Marvel Blade ja:ブレイド (2011年のアニメ)	Rome		
2011	Nura: Rise of the Yokai Clan	Haiware Keikain		
2011	Battle Spirits: Heroes	Haku Ragoshia		
2011	Maji de Watashi ni Koi Shinasai!	Ryuhei Itagaki		
2011	Last Exile: Fam, the Silver Wing	Atamora		
2011	Future Diary	Ryuji Kurosaki		
2012	Brave 10	Kojuro Katakura		
2012	The Knight in the Area	Director, referee		
2012	Aquarion Evol	Principal, Commander		
2012	Thermae Romae	Design office director		
2012	Zumomo to Nupepe ja:ズモモとヌペペ	Don Gurireone, Mezamachine ドン・グリレオーネ / メザマッシーン		
2012	Is This a Zombie? Of the Dead	Ikamegaro		
2012	Shirokuma Café	Gorilla		
2012	Transformers: Prime	Vogel	broadcast in US	
2012	Inazuma Eleven GO: Chrono Stone	Shinzo Hirai, Tsunoba Osho, Kanu		
2012	Aesthetica of a Rogue Hero	Kaito Kubota		
2012	Tanken Driland	Jungo		
2012	The Ambition of Oda Nobuna	Itetsu Inaba 稲葉一鉄		
2012	JoJo's Bizarre Adventure: Phantom Blood	Tarkus		
2012	Case Closed	Paul	Natsu no Kaitou Kid Matsuri	
2013	Bakumatsu Gijinden Roman	Akafun no senbee		
2013	Boku wa osama ja:ぼくは王さま	Tonari no kuni no ōsama となりの国の王さま		
2013	Tanken Driland: Sennen no Mahō	Doug		
2013	Dog & Scissors	Wanriki Munakata		
2013	Blood Lad	Franken Stein		
2013	Battle Spirits Saikyou Ginga Ultimate Zero	Akatsuki no Bajira		
2013	Gaist Crusher	Ryumon		
2013	Infinite Stratos 2	Villain		
2013	Kill la Kill	Ira Gamagoori		
2013	I Couldn't Become a Hero, So I Reluctantly Decided to Get a Job	Eric Fritz		
2013	Hajime no Ippo: Rising	Larry Bernard		
2013	Gundam Build Fighters	Tatsuzo		
2014	Robot Girls Z	Ryoma		
2014	D-Frag!	Odawara		
2014	Super Sonico the Animation	Ika Kaijin		
2014	Cardfight!! Vanguard: Legion Mate	Daiysha, Tetsu Shinjo		
2014	Marvel Disk Wars: The Avengers	Crimson Dynamo		
2014	Kutsudaru くつだる。	Narrator		
2014	Notari Matsutarō	Inokawa		
2014	Dragon Collection	Meatmania		
2014	Hero Bank	Tetsunosuke Kinnari		
2014	Sengoku Basara: End of Judgement	Muneshige Tachibana		
2014	Jinsei	Narrator		
2014	Tokyo ESP	Rindo Urushiba		
2014	Gundam Reconguista in G	Garanden captain		
2014	Amagi Brilliant Park	Wrench-kun		
2014	Gonna be the Twin-Tail!!	Draggildy		
2015	High School DxD BorN	Barakiel		
2015	PriPara	Sophie's father	season 2	
2015	Triage X	Mido Hayabusa		
2015	Pikaia! ja:ピカイア!	Frazer Vice President		
2015	Gangsta.	Galahad Woeho		
2016	Ojisan to Marshmallow	Habahiro Hige (日下幅広)		
2016	Kono Subarashii Sekai ni Shukufuku o!	Ruffian (荒くれ者)		
2016	Endride	Ibelda		
2016	The Heroic Legend of Arslan: Dust Storm Dance	Ilterish		
2017–2025	My Hero Academia	Enji Todoroki/Endeavor		
2017	Fate/Apocrypha	Caster of Red/William Shakespeare		
2017	Made in Abyss	Haborugu	Ep. 2, 4, 7, 9	
2017	Mahōjin Guru Guru	Kasegi Gold	Ep. 2-3	
2017	Katsugeki/Touken Ranbu	Hijikata Toshizō		
2018	Golden Kamuy	Captain Wada		
2018	Boruto: Naruto Next Generations	Gekkou		
2018	SSSS.Gridman	Alexis Kerib		
2018	Radiant	Boss		
2019	Isekai Quartet	Ruffian	Eps. 6, 8	
2019	Demon Slayer: Kimetsu no Yaiba	Spider Demon (father)		
2019	Kengan Ashura	Jun Sekibayashi		
2019	The Demon Girl Next Door	Narrator		
2019	Kemono Michi: Rise Up	MAO (Macadamian Ogre)		
2019	Fate/Grand Order – Absolute Demonic Front: Babylonia	Musashibō Benkei		
2020	Yatogame-chan Kansatsu Nikki 2 Satsume	Recchiri-sensei		
2020	Dorohedoro	Tanba		
2020	Appare-Ranman!	Chase the Bad		
2020	The Misfit of Demon King Academy	Gaios Anzem		
2020	By the Grace of the Gods	Wogan		
2021	Back Arrow	Bai Toatsu		
2021	Redo of Healer	Bullet		
2021	Jujutsu Kaisen	Juzo Kumiya		
2021	Vivy: Fluorite Eye's Song	Kuwana		
2021	How a Realist Hero Rebuilt the Kingdom	Gaius Amidonia		
2021–2023	The Fruit of Evolution	Gassle Kroot, Saria (before evolution)		
2021	Super Crooks	Roddy Diesel	ONA	
2022	Miss Kuroitsu from the Monster Development Department	Megistus		
2022	I'm Quitting Heroing	Edwald		
2022	Don't Hurt Me, My Healer!	Golem		
2022	Tomodachi Game	Jūzō Kadokura		
2022	Spriggan	Bo Brantz		
2022	Lucifer and the Biscuit Hammer	Sōichirō Nagumo		
2022	Reincarnated as a Sword	Donadrond		
2022–present	Bleach: Thousand-Year Blood War	Sajin Komamura, Love Aikawa		
2023	Hell's Paradise: Jigokuraku	Gantetsusai Tamiya		
2023	Magical Destroyers	Anime Otaku		
2023	Yakitori: Soldiers of Misfortune	John Do	ONA	
2023	Classroom for Heroes	Asmodeus		
2023	Record of Ragnarok II	Hajun	ONA	
2023	Rurouni Kenshin	Shikijō		
2023	My Daughter Left the Nest and Returned an S-Rank Adventurer	Cheborg		
2023	Firefighter Daigo: Rescuer in Orange	Kyōsuke Yamagami		
2023	Tokyo Revengers: Tenjiku Arc	Kanji Mochizuki		
2024	Sengoku Youko	Dōren		
2024	Brave Bang Bravern!	Cupiridas		
2024	The Unwanted Undead Adventurer	Wolff		
2024	An Archdemon's Dilemma: How to Love Your Elf Bride	Raphael Hyurandell		
2024	Rising Impact	Daichi Arai	ONA	
2024	Kinnikuman: Perfect Origin Arc	Sunshine		
2024	The Elusive Samurai	Hoshina Yasaburō		
2024	Loner Life in Another World	Guild Boss		
2024	Let This Grieving Soul Retire	Arnold Hail		
2024	Blue Miburo	Naozumi Kyohachi		
2025	Ishura Season 2	Uhak the Silent		
2025	Farmagia	Corpus		
2025	Guilty Gear Strive: Dual Rulers	Leo Whitefang		
2025	I'm the Evil Lord of an Intergalactic Empire!	Goaz		
2025	The Brilliant Healer's New Life in the Shadows	Goldran		
2025	New Saga	Gazas		
2025	Dusk Beyond the End of the World	Vare		
2025	Let This Grieving Soul Retire Part 2	Arnold Hail		
2026	Always a Catch!	Maria's father		
2026	The Klutzy Class Monitor and the Girl with the Short Skirt	Kaoru Kogori		
2026	Chainsmoker Cat	Landlord		
2026	The Ghost in the Shell	Head of Security		
2026	The Villager of Level 999	Dark Dragon		
2026	Tank Chair	Yoshitsune		
2027	Kindergarten Wars	Gordon		

=== Films ===
List of voice performances in feature films
Year	Title	Role	Notes	Source
1981	Mobile Suit Gundam I	Wakkein		
1982	Mobile Suit Gundam III: Encounters in Space	Wakkein		
1999	Funny candy of Okashinana!?	Kogerobo		
2001	One Piece: Clockwork Island Adventure	Danny		
2001	One Piece: Jango's Dance Carnival	Captain	short, shown with Clockwork	
2002	6 Angels	Sam Canyon		
2003	One Piece The Movie: Dead End no Bōken	Pogo		
2004	One Piece: The Cursed Holy Sword	Boss		
2004	Appleseed	Layton	2004 film	
2004	Steamboy	Jason		
2005	The Princess in the Birdcage Kingdom	Kurogane		
2007	One Piece Movie: The Desert Princess and the Pirates: Adventures in Alabasta	Mr.1		
2007	Bleach: The DiamondDust Rebellion	Sajin Komamura		
2008	Fist of the North Star: The Legends of the True Savior: Zero: Legend of Kenshiro	Gades		
2008	Bleach: Fade to Black	Sajin Komamura		
2009	Tenjōbito to Akutobito Saigo no Tatakai	Gas		
2009	Kamen Rider Decade: All Riders vs. Dai-Shocker	Kamen Rider 1		
2013	Aura: Maryūinkōga Saigo no Tatakai	White Coat Man		
2015	Dragon Ball Z: Resurrection 'F'	Shisami		
	Chain Chronicle	Greg/Dodogaru	short film	
2017	Kuroko's Basketball The Movie: Last Game	Jason Silver		
2017	Fate/stay night: Heaven's Feel	True Assassin/Hassan-i Sabbah		
2019	Promare	Varys Truss		
2019	My Hero Academia: Heroes Rising	Endeavor		
2020	Fate/Grand Order: Camelot – Wandering; Agaterám	Hassan of the Cursed Arm		
2021	My Hero Academia: World Heroes' Mission	Endeavor		
2024	My Hero Academia: You're Next	Endeavor		

=== Video games ===
List of voice performances in video games
Year	Title	Role	Notes	Source
1996	Der Langrisser FX	Osuto		
1997–2025	Dynasty Warriors series	Lu Bu, Huang Gai	Until Dynasty Warriors: Origins	
1997	Sparkling Feather	Turtoise	PC FX	
1997	Langrisser IV	Shogun Arudan	Sega Saturn	
1999	Getter Robo Daikessen! ja:ゲッターロボ大決戦!	Gai Daido	PS1/PS2	
1999	Zoku Mikagura Shōjo Tanteidan ~Kanketsuhen~ 続・御神楽少女探偵団 ～完結編～	Kozo Iba	PS1/PS2	
1999	Growlanser I	Berger	Also 2009 remake	
2000	Sentimental Graffiti 2 ja:センチメンタルグラフティ2	Ken Iwamoto	Dreamcast	
2000	Hokuto no Ken: Seikimatsu Kyūseishu Densetsu ja:北斗の拳 世紀末救世主伝説	Raiga, Hiruka ライガ / ヒルカ	PS1/PS2	
2000	Tales of Eternia	Ifrit	PS1/PS2	
2001	Segagaga	Research director A, Research director B, Announcer	Dreamcast	
2001	Love Songs: Idol ga Classmate ja:Love Songs アイドルがクラスメ〜ト	Tetsu Gomi	PS1/PS2	
2001	Shadow Hearts	Jack	PS1/PS2	
2001	Everybody's Golf 3	Morgan, Rock	PS1/PS2	
2001	Summon Night 2 ja:サモンナイト2	Jakini, Karausu	PS1/PS2	
2001	Inuyasha	Manten	PS1	
2002	Simple 2000 Ultimate Vol. 1: Love*Smash! Super Tennis Players	Left Hook Smith	PS1/PS2	
2002	Grandia Xtreme	Jade	PS1/PS2	
2002	Tales of Fandom Vol.1	Ifrit, Bob	PS1/PS2	
2002	Kanon	Ishibashi-sensei	PS1/PS2	
2002	Xenosaga Episode I: Der Wille zur Macht	Togashi	PS1/PS2	
2002	Mega Man Zero	Phantom	Game Boy Advance	
2002	Yakitori Musume: Sugo Ude Hanjouki ja:やきとり娘〜スゴ腕繁盛記〜	Joji	PS1/PS2	
2002	Cherry Petals Fall Like Teardrops	Yataro Asama, Hiroki Tanigawa	Adult PC; As Tetsuo Imada	
2002	GioGio's Bizarre Adventure	Leone Abbacchio	PS2	
2002	Groove Adventure Rave: Mikan no Hiseki	Henchman	PS1/PS2	
2003	Venus & Braves	Oruga, King	Also 2011 PSP version	
2003	Muv-Luv	Tamase Genjo Itsuki 珠瀬玄丞斎	Adult PC	
2003	Interlude		Dreamcast, PS2, Windows	
2003	Green Green	Bontenmaru	PS1/PS2	
2003	Yumeria	Teacher	PS1/PS2	
2003	Summon Night 3	Jakini	PS1/PS2	
2003	Tales of Symphonia	Irfit		
2003	Mobile Suit Gundam: Encounters in Space	Wakkein	PS1/PS2	
2003	Growlanser IV	Munzer	PS1/PS2	
2004	Airforce Delta Strike	Rick Campbell, Sergei Kinski, Jake Emerson	PS2	
2004	Your Heart Will be Stolen at the 24th Hour ~ Phantom Thief Jade ~ 24時、君のハートは盗まれる～怪盗ジェイド～	Reo Saotome	Adult PC	
2004	Galactic Wrestling	Shogun Akuma	PS1/PS2	
2004	Mega Man Zero 3	Phantom	Game Boy Advance	
2004	Atelier Iris: Eternal Mana	Muru	PS1/PS2	
2004	Aoi Namida ja:青い涙 (ゲーム)	Kyotaro Kashiwagi	Xbox	
2004	Metal Gear Solid 3: Snake Eater	Colonel Volgin	PS1/PS2	
2005	Mobile Suit Gundam: The One Year War ja:機動戦士ガンダム 一年戦争	Wakkein	PS2	
2005	Tengai Makyō III: Namida ja:天外魔境III NAMIDA	Rekka no myo 烈火の明王	PS1/PS2	
2005	Namco × Capcom	Beraboman	PS2	
2005	Steamboy	Jason Stapps	PS1/PS2	
2005	The Sword of Etheria	Vitis	PS1/PS2	
2005	3rd Super Robot Wars Alpha: To the End of the Galaxy	Rätsel Feinschmecker, Emperor Muge-Zorubadosu ムゲ・ゾルバドス帝王		
2005	Yo-Jin-Bo	Monyama Kadokura	PC, also PS2 version in 2006	
2005	Castlevania: Dawn of Sorrow	Hummer	Nintendo DS	
2005	Tales of Legendia	Curtis	PS1/PS2	
2005	Critical Velocity	Gordon	PS2	
2005	Sakigake!! Otokojuku	Rasetsu	PS1/PS2	
2005–2015	Quiz Magic Academy series	Saunders	starting with 3	
2005	Front Mission 5: Scars of the War	Randy O'Neill	PS1/PS2	
2006	Gunparade Orchestra: Shiro no Shou	Ryoma Taniguchi	PS1/PS2	
2006	Samurai Champloo: Sidetracked	Murasaki hi oni	PS1/PS2	
2006	Muv-Luv Alternative	Tamase Genjo Itsuki 珠瀬玄丞斎	Adult PC	
2006	Gunparade Orchestra: Midori no Shou	Ryoma Taniguchi	PS1/PS2	
2006	Samurai 7	Gorobei Katayama	PS1/PS2	
2006	Xenosaga Episode III	Togashi	PS1/PS2	
2006	Adventures of Brave Story Wataru ブレイブ ストーリー ワタルの冒険	Father Dragon	PS1/PS2	
2006	Mega Man ZX	Model P, Thon	Nintendo DS	
2006	Gunparade Orchestra: Ao no Shou	Ryoma Taniguchi	PS1/PS2	
2006	ja:Scarlett	Bettō Izumi Kurō sukāretto 別当・和泉九郎・スカーレット	Adult PC, also remake in 2008	
2006	Tales of Phantasia	Brambert Milene	PSP version	
2006	The Legend of Heroes: Trails in the Sky	Zin Vathek	PSP	
2006	Really? Really!	Mikio Fuyo	Adult PC, also DS version in 2009	
2006	Metal Gear Solid: Portable Ops	Colonel Sukuronoski スコウロンスキー大佐	PSP	
2007	Appleseed EX	Layton	PS1/PS2	
2007	Warriors Orochi	Huang Gai, Lu Bu	PS1/PS2	
2007	Fate/stay night Réalta Nua	Hasan	PS1/PS2	
2007	Shining Wind	Rowen	PS1/PS2	
2007	Tales of Fandom Vol.2	Ifrit	PS1/PS2	
2007	Rockman ZX Advent	Model P	Nintendo DS	
2007–2008	Fate/tiger colosseum	Shin Assassin	PSP, also Upper	
2007	Generation of Chaos	Ryuhain	PS1/PS2	
2007	The Legend of Heroes: Trails in the Sky SC	Zin Vathek	PSP	
2007	Wonderland Online: Ankoku no kinjutsu	Cliff	Windows	
2008	Rune Factory 2: A Fantasy Harvest Moon	Brurai, Gordon	Nintendo DS	
2008	Yggdra Union: We'll Never Fight Alone	Gunshin barudo~usu/ doruto 軍神バルドゥス / ドルト	PSP version	
2008	Eternal Poison	Rogue	PlayStation 2	
2008	Phantasy Star 0	Ogi	Nintendo DS	
2008	Warriors Orochi 2	Huang Gai, Lu Bu	PS1/PS2	
2008	G Senjō no Maō	Gonzou Azai	Adult PC; As Denemon Iguchi	
2008	Super Robot Taisen OG Saga: Endless Frontier	Shuten, Eizer Guranata	Nintendo DS	
2008	The Legend of Heroes: Trails in the Sky the 3rd	Zin Vathek	PSP	
2008	Sigma Harmonics	Dixon	Nintendo DS	
2008	Macross Ace Frontier	Pilot B	PSP	
2008	Suikoden Tierkreis	Daiafuru ダイアルフ	Nintendo DS	
2009	We Without Wings	Itami togi-rō Ra 伊丹伽楼羅	Adult PC; As Big Bang Heita	
2009	Mikunisohanashi 三国想話	San Koson		
2009	Bamboo Blade: Sorekara no Chousen バンブーブレード ～"それから"の挑戦～	Kenzaburo Ishibashi	PSP	
2009	Trample on Schatten!! ja:Trample on "Schatten!!" 〜かげふみのうた〜	Gen Sakahara 坂原弦凱	Adult PC	
2009	Hottarake no Shima: Kanata to Nijiiro no Kagami	Nazu no junin 謎の住人	Nintendo DS	
2009	Maji de Watashi ni Koi Shinasai!	Ryuhei Itagaki	Adult PC; As Ichiyama Misheru	
2009	Bleach: The 3rd Phantom		Nintendo DS	
2009	Tales of Vesperia	Irfit, Omagh, Fero	PS3	
2009	Macross Ultimate Frontier	Gary Murdoch	PSP	
2009	Full Metal Daemon: Muramasa	Yusa Doshin 遊佐童心	Adult PC; As Denemon Iguchi	
2009	Dragon Ball: Raging Blast	Nappa		
2009	R-Type Tactics II: Operation Bitter Chocolate	Male protagonist	PSP	
2010	Zangeki no Reginleiv	Hagen	Wii	
2010	Super Robot Taisen OG Saga: Endless Frontier EXCEED	Shuten, Ezel Granada	Nintendo DS	
2010	Angelic Crest	Dahl	PC	
2010	Sengoku Basara: Samurai Heroes	Muneshige Tachibana		
2010	Oretachi ni Tsubasa wa Nai AfterStory	Itami togi-rō Ra 伊丹伽楼羅	Adult PC; As Big Bang Heita	
2010	Tales of Phantasia: Narikiri Dungeon X	Brambert Milene, Irfit	PSP	
2010	Dragon Ball: Raging Blast 2	Nappa	PS3	
2010	Shining Hearts	Isaac	PSP	
2010	Ore no Kanojo: Tsure wa Hito Denashi ja:俺の彼女はヒトでなし	Jiyuro Eiakira 英瑛重朗	Adult PC; As Big Bang Heita	
2010	World Wide Love ja:世界征服彼女	Torasame Yasojima 八十島虎鮫	Adult PC; As Hyodo Emeriyaenko	
2011	Macross Triangle Frontier	Gary Murdoch	PSP	
2011	Dead or Alive: Dimensions	Raidou	Nintendo 3DS	
2011	Doctor Lautrec and the Forgotten Knights	Gustav Brachenstein ギュスタフ・ブロッケンシュタイン	Nintendo 3DS	
2011	Nichijo (Uchobito) 日常（宇宙人）	Takasaki-sensei	PSP	
2011	Sengoku Basara 3: Party	Tachibana Muneshige		
2011	Dragon Ball Z: Ultimate Tenkaichi	Nappa		
2012	Maji de Watashi ni Koi Shinasai! S 真剣で私に恋しなさい！S	Ryuhei Itagaki	Adult PC; As Ichiyama Misheru	
2012	Genso Suikoden: Tsumugareshi Hyakunen no Toki	Badamuhatan, Satiyaka	PSP	
2012	Shining Blade	Fenrir	PSP	
2012	Kid Icarus: Uprising	Taiyoshin Razu	Nintendo 3DS	
2012	Code of Princess	Master T. Drakkhen	Nintendo 3DS	
2012	Atelier Ayesha: The Alchemist of Dusk	Fred Rodfork	PS3	
2012	Tokyo Babel ja:東京バベル	Beriaru	PC	
2012	Project X Zone	Arthur	Nintendo 3DS	
2012	Witch's Garden ja:ウィッチズガーデン	Jouji Kurauchi	Adult PC; As Big Bang Heita	
2012	Fist of the North Star: Ken's Rage 2	Devil Rebirth, Akashachi		
2013	Shining Ark	Jinga	PSP	
2013	Tsuki ni Yori Sou Otome no Sahou: After Story 月に寄りそう乙女の作法 アフターストーリー	Ichiyo Yasujima	Adult PC; As Big Bang Heita	
2013	Super Robot Wars OG Infinite Battle ja:スーパーロボット大戦OG INFINITE BATTLE	Rätsel Feinschmecke	PS3	
2014	Guilty Gear Xrd -SIGN-	Leo Whitefang	Arcade, PC, PS3, PS4, also -REVELATOR	
2014	Granblue Fantasy	Ladiva	iOS, Android	
2014	Blade Arcus from Shining	Fenrir, Isaac	Arcade	
2014	The Legend of Heroes: Trails to Azure	Sigmund Orlando		
2014	Tsuki ni Yori Sou Otome no Sahou 2 ja:月に寄りそう乙女の作法2	Ichiyo Yasujima	Adult PC; As Big Bang Heita	
2015	Lost Heroes Bonus Edition ja:ロストヒーローズ	Kamen Rider 1	PSP	
2015	Dead or Alive 5 Last Round	Raido		
2015	Digimon Story: Cyber Sleuth	Gankoomon		
2015	Bravely Second: End Layer	Kuu Fuurin	N3DS	
2015	Sengoku Basara 4	Tachibana Muneshige		
2015	Fate/Grand Order	Musashibo Benkei, William Shakespeare, Hassan of Cursed Arm, Nikola Tesla, Charles Babbage		
2015	Blade Arcus from Shining EX	Fenrir, Isaac		
2015	Mighty No. 9	Mighty No. 4 Seismic		
2017	Musou Stars	Lu Bu		
2017	Sdorica	Pang, Pang SP		
2017	Xenoblade Chronicles 2	Dromarch		
2019	Dead or Alive 6	Raidou		
2021	Guilty Gear -STRIVE-	Leo Whitefang	PC, PS4, PS5	
2021	Cookie Run: Kingdom	Muscle Cookie		
2022	Valkyrie Elysium	Eygon	PC, PS4, PS5	
2022	The Legend of Heroes: Trails Through Daybreak II	Zin Vathek	PS4, PS5	
2025	Trails in the Sky 1st Chapter	Zin Vathek		

=== Tokusatsu ===
List of voice performances in tokusatsu
Year	Title	Role	Notes	Source
1996	B-Fighter Kabuto	Deadly Poison Armored Descorpion	Ep. 28 – 35, 38 – 45, 47 – 50	
1999	Kyuukyuu Sentai GoGoFive: Sudden Shock! A New Warrior	Juuma King Golmois	OV	
2000	Kamen Rider Kuuga Super Secret Video: Kamen Rider Kuuga vs. the Strong Monster Go-Jiino-Da	Go-Jiino-Da	Original Video	
2000	Mirai Sentai Timeranger	Hijacker Nabokov (ep. 8), Poacher Master Hunter (ep. 30)	Ep. 8, 30	
2001	Hyakujuu Sentai Gaoranger	Highness Duke Org Shuten	Eps. 1 – 14, 47 – 49	
2002	Ultraman Cosmos	Alien Nowar	Ep. 43, 53	
2002	Ultraman Cosmos 2: The Blue Planet	Ultraman Cosmos	Movie	
2002	Ultraman Cosmos vs. Ultraman Justice: The Final Battle	Ultraman Cosmos, Ultraman Legend	Movie	
2003	Bakuryu Sentai Abaranger	Trinoid #4: Bakudandelion	Ep. 3, 13	
2004	Tokusou Sentai Dekaranger	Anubian Doggie Kruger/Dekamaster		
2004	Ultraman Nexus	Dark Faust	Eps. 7 – 12	
2005	Mahou Sentai Magiranger	Hades Warrior God Ifrit	Eps. 35 – 36	
2006	Ultraman Mebius	Alien Magma Brothers	Ep. 16	
2006	Mahou Sentai Magiranger vs. Dekaranger	Anubian Doggie Kruger/Deka Master	OV	
2007	Kamen Rider Den-O	Kraken Imagin	Ep. 35 – 36	
2007	Juken Sentai Gekiranger	Mythical Beast Capricorn-Fist Dorou	Ep. 41 – 42	
2008	Engine Sentai Go-onger	Savage Sky Barbaric Machine Beast Engine Banki	Ep. 37	
2009	Kamen Rider Decade	Strange Demon Robot Schwarian	Ep. 26 – 27	
2009	Kamen Rider Decade: All Riders vs. Dai-Shocker	Kamen Rider 1	Movie	
2009	Samurai Sentai Shinkenger	Ayakashi Happouzu	Ep. 32 – 33	
2010	Tensou Sentai Goseiger	Thailago Alien Targate of the Satellite	Ep. 14	
2011	Kamen Rider × Kamen Rider Fourze & OOO: Movie War Mega Max	Kamen Rider 1	Movie	
2011	Kaizoku Sentai Gokaiger	Anubian Doggie Kruger	Ep. 5	
2011	Gokaiger Goseiger Super Sentai 199 Hero Great Battle	Anubian Doggie Krugger/Deka Master	Movie	
2012	Kamen Rider × Super Sentai: Super Hero Taisen	Kamen Rider 1, Deka Red	Movie	
2013	Kamen Rider × Super Sentai × Space Sheriff: Super Hero Taisen Z	Kamen Rider 1, Deka Red, Strange Demon Robot Schwarian	Movie	
2013	Zyuden Sentai Kyoryuger	Debo Kibishidesu	Ep. 14, 37	
2014	Ressha Sentai ToQger vs. Kamen Rider Gaim: Spring Break Combined Special	Kamen Rider 1	TV special	
2014	Heisei Riders vs. Shōwa Riders: Kamen Rider Taisen feat. Super Sentai	Kamen Rider J, Tigerroid, Orphnoch	Movie	
2015	Kamen Rider Ghost	Seiryutou Gamma (ep. 9 – 10), Kamen Rider 1 (ep. 24)	Ep. 9 – 10, 24	
2015	Shuriken Sentai Ninninger	Yokai Kamaitachi	Ep. 1	
2015	Super Hero Taisen GP: Kamen Rider 3	Kamen Rider 1 other	Movie	
2015	Tokusou Sentai Dekaranger 10 Years After	Anubian Doggie Kruger/Deka Master	OV	
2016	Kamen Rider Ex-Aid	Revol Bugster	Ep. 3, 15 – 16, 27	
2017	Power Rangers Dino Force Brave	Fire Deemon Lord Homuras	Eps. 1 – 11	
2017	Doubutsu Sentai Zyuohger Returns	Announcer	OV	
2017	Uchuu Sentai Kyuranger	Anubian Doggie Kruger	Ep. 18	
2017	Space Squad: Gavan vs. Dekaranger	Anubian Doggie Kruger	OV	
2018	Kaitou Sentai Lupinranger VS Keisatsu Sentai Patranger	Kerbero Gangan	Ep. 34	
2019	Super Sentai Strongest Battle	Anubian Doggie Kruger/Deka Master	Television special	
2019	Kishiryu Sentai Ryusoulger	Gachireus	Eps. 14 – 16, 27 – 29, 31 – 39	
2019	Kishiryu Sentai Ryusoulger the Movie: Time Slip! Dinosaur Panic	Gachireus	Movie	
2020	Mashin Sentai Kiramager	Mashin Hakobu	Eps. 28 – 40, 42, 44, 45	
2021	Saber + Zenkaiger: Superhero Senki	Anubian Doggie Kruger/Deka Master	Movie	
2024	Tokusou Sentai Dekaranger 20th: Fireball Booster	Anubian Doggie Kruger	OV	
2025	Bakuage Sentai Boonboomger vs. King-Ohger	Manhole Grumer/Black Hole Grumer	OV	
2026	No.1 Sentai Gozyuger vs. Boonboomger	Universe No.1	OV	

=== Dubbing ===
List of voice performances in overseas dubbing
Title	Role	Dub for	Notes	Source
Dynasty Warriors	Lü Bu	Louis Koo		
Eternals	Gilgamesh	Don Lee		
Forbidden Games	Joseph Dollé	Lucien Hubert	New Era Movies edition	
Power Rangers Mystic Force	Daggeron/Solaris Knight	John Tui		
Wolfe	Professor Wolfe Kinteh	Babou Ceesay		

Animation
Title	Role	Notes	Source
Spider-Man: Into the Spider-Verse	Aaron Davis / Prowler		
Thomas and Friends	Lorry 1	Season 5 only	
Transformers: Cyberverse	Grimlock, Shockwave, Prowl, Bludgeon, Dirge	Main roles	
Transformers Adventure	Groundpounder		
Transformers One	Darkwing		

=== Drama CDs ===
List of voice performances in audio dramas
Title	Role	Notes	Source
Cinematic Sound Drama GetBackers -Bug's Karma- (MKC-0009), 2006.01.31	Ryuho Akimoku	Drama CD	
Cinematic Sound Drama GetBackers -The Origin- (MKC-0010), 2006.08.31	Ryuho Akimoku	Drama CD	
Edelweiss: Eidenjima Pollen War		Drama CD	
Hana no Keiji ja:花の慶次	Hideyasu Yuki	Radio drama	
Is This a Zombie?	Gorilla	Drama CD	
ONE～輝く季節へ～ 里村茜ストーリー「たいせつなばしょ」	Shigeo Watanabe	Drama CD	
Supa Supa Drama		Talk CD	
Tales of Destiny Chijou-hen		Talk CD	
Ten Nights of Dreams: The Fifth Night	General	CD	
Tindharia no Tane		Talk CD	
