= Shining Hearts =

2010 video game

- Developer: Studio Saizensen
- Publisher: Sega
- Artist: Tony Taka
- Composer: Hiroki Kikuta
- Series: Shining
- Platform: PlayStation Portable
- Release: JP: December 16, 2010
- Genre: Role-playing
- Mode: Single-player

Shining Hearts (シャイニング・ハーツ, Shainingu Hātsu) is a PlayStation Portable role-playing video game for the series. Other ones include Shining Tears and Shining Wind. It was adapted into an anime miniseries Shining Hearts: Shiawase no Pan.

== Gameplay ==
The player controls four characters for the team. The ocean serves as a major part with the ship. While it starts off in a ragged state, the player can build up with new functions to travel through islands. The player can roam the island, take part in many activities, and progress through story missions or take on side quests. The player collects materials for baking, forging and fishing. The player can work through the story and help villagers for quests to collect Hearts. If the player returns the emotions for Kaguya, her spirit stone releases "Heart Keys" and open doors to new worlds. Hearts have a parameter indicating how people feel about the characters. In response to their actions, they release any type of colours with feelings. By collecting them, the player can bring about changes to the setting and world, and expand the journey to new areas. Hearts can be used in battle. It is possible to use Hearts when preparing bread at the bakery. One method for collecting Hearts is through the Mind Over Emotion System. During conversation, the player can select a response under constraint of time. Depending on the selection, the conversation partner can release Hearts indicating their reaction. Their favor for characters can change accordingly. There is more than one in the game, and one of them being the "Battle MOE" System. Battle MOE is a group attack system. The player receives a chance to pair up with one of them for groups. Depending on the selections, the player can get different moves. Some group attacks result in heal spells and in group attacks among others. Emotional characters can change during combat. They can perform team attacks for the player to release Red Hearts. Any unselected characters will release Blue Hearts.

== Plot ==
=== Story ===
Kaguya, an amnesic girl washed ashore, meets a swordsman Rick. The peaceful island of Wyndaria is invaded by pirates who seek the pendant. Knowing the situation, Rick plans to restore her memory.

=== Characters ===
- Rick (リック, Rikku): A male swordsman stranded in the island of Wyndaria. He works with a trio of sisters at the bakery.
- Airy (エアリィ, Earii), Amil (アミル, Amiru), Neris (ネリス, Nerisu): A trio of sisters working in the bakery, they have a unique style of baking.
- Kaguya (カグヤ, Kaguya): A mysterious girl who was washed ashore the island of Wyndaria after the storm. She has amnesia and along with them, her emotions. Soon after meeting Rick, the pirates seek the amulet necklace Kaguya is wearing.
- Rufina (ルフィーナ, Rufīna): Princess of Wynderia. She is kind and gentle, and due to her interest in tea and herbs, she appears in the palace garden. She takes a great interest in Rick and his party.
- Ragnus (ラグナス, Ragunasu): Prince of Wynderia, and Rufina's elder brother. He can often be seen dealing with herbs in the palace garden. He serves as a guide for Rick.
- Rouna (ローナ, Rōna): Rufina's maid. She belongs to the beast race. She is an expert with blades, and keeps a good store underneath her dress and in a bag.
- Xiao-Mei (シャオメイ, Shaomei): A fickle black cat pirate and a member of the beast race. She runs an antique shop. Her nickname is "Black Tail".
- Alvin (アルヴィン, Aruvin): One of the forest elves with the ability to control spirits. After hearing the warning of an approaching change in the world, he meets Rick. In battle, he uses a bow and magic. He is meant to support from the back line with pride.
- Melty (メルティ, Merutei): An ice witch living in a mansion near the village. because she is not fond of people and likes the night, she stays inside. Rick ends up in the company of Melty as he finds the ingredients for creating "extreme ice cream." In battle, all Melty's special attacks are ice cream based. She uses her partner, Sorbet, to absorb her damage.
- Sorbet (ソルベエ, Sorubee): Melty's familiar spirit.
- Dylan (ディラン, Deiran): The pirate captain of a group, Arc Buccaneers.
- Mistyral (ミストラル, Misutoraru): A female pirate.
- Maxima Enfield (マキシマ, Makishima)
- Queen (クイーン, Kuīn) Kaguya's robot partner.

== Development and release ==
The game was released in Japan on December 16, 2010. Hiroki Kikuta composed the game's music. The song, entitled "Kokoro ni Todoku Uta" (心に届く詩), sung by Lia, was released on December 15, 2010. The soundtrack was released on January 26, 2011.
