= List of Ultra N Project characters =

This is a character list for Ultra N Project, a multimedia project which centers around Ultraman Noa and his appearances in medias such as magazines, the 2004 series Ultraman Nexus and its movie prequel, Ultraman: The Next.

== TLT ==
The Terrestrial Liberation Trust (地球解放機構, Chikyū Kaihō Kikō), abbreviated as TLT (ティルト, Tiruto), is a top secret global, non-government organization set up to investigate, research and defeat the Space Beast (スペースビースト, Supēsu Bīsuto) threat. Whereas the major headquarters is in North America, the show's major focus is Japan's TLT (TLT-J) branch. The main teams of TLT are the Night Raider, Memory Police (who erase the memories of civilians involved in any Night Raider mission or witnessing any Space Beast attacks) and White Sweeper, who are involved in clean-up.

=== Night Raider ===
Night Raider (ナイトレイダー, Naito Reidā) are TLT-J's special group in charge of Space Beast eradication. The group's true name is TLT-J Special Strategy Mission Group (TLT-J特殊戦略任務班, Tiruto-Jei Tokushu Senryaku Ninmu Han) as members consist of elite cadets in TLT. The squad led by Captain Wakura is known as Night Raider A Unit (ナイトレイダーAユニット, Naito Reidā Ē Yunitto) while there are other groups of Night Raiders, as implied in episode 18. The final episode saw this development as multiple Chrome Chester units patrolling the sky a year after Dark Zagi's destruction.

In addition to NR Special Suits (NRスペシャルスーツ, Enu Āru Supesharu Sūtsu) and NR Met (NRメット, Enu Āru Metto), officers are equipped with a Pulse Breigar (パルスブレイガー, Parusu Bureigā) wrist communicator/launcher and a Divait Launcher (ディバイトランチャー, Dibaito Ranchā) rifle.

- Kazuki Komon (孤門 一輝, Komon Kazuki): see here
- Nagi Saijyo (西条 凪, Saijō Nagi): see here
- Eisuke Wakura (和倉 英輔, Wakura Eisuke): The captain of the Night Raiders. He is a good leader and takes action effectively in any situation. He cares for his teammates and is well trusted by them. Although his motto is to follow orders, he will take necessary action if it means to protect others. He is a brother figure towards Komon who provides wisdom to the new recruit. He is portrayed by Tamotsu Ishibashi (石橋 保, Ishibashi Tamotsu).
- Shiori Hiraki (平木 詩織, Hiraki Shiori): A female in the Night Raider team. Although she looks pretty and cute, she is an expert in weapons and can be very strong and helpful during missions. She has a good personal relationship with Mitsuhiko Ishibori. After Nagi becomes the fourth Dunamist in the final episode, Shiori is shot by Ishibori when he reveals himself as Dark Zagi to the team, but is later shown defending people with the rest of the Night Raiders from Beasts in the closing scenes of the series. She is portrayed by Keiko Gotō (五藤 圭子, Gotō Keiko).
- Mitsuhiko Ishibori: See here
- Shinya Mizorogi: See here

=== High-ranking TLT staff members ===
- Yu Kirasawa (吉良沢 優, Kirasawa Yū): TLT's strategist under the codename "Illustrator" (イラストレーター, Irasutorētā), usually coordinating the Night Raiders' operations against the Space Beasts as part of the CIC (Combat Information Center). Appearing in the form of a hologram, he knows more about the Space Beasts and Nexus than he seems to. It is eventually revealed that he is also a member of Promethean Child like Ren, and lived in the same facility with him in Dallas. When Ren was caught trying to run away from the place, he gives Kirasawa a rope necklace. He is portrayed by Nobuhiko Tanaka (田中 伸彦, Tanaka Nobuhiko).
- Yōichirō Matsunaga (松永 要一郎, Matsunaga Yōichirō): The director of TLT who lost his wife during the battle between Ultraman and The One 5 years ago. In order to better protect the planet from the threat posed by the Space Beasts, he wishes to know the secrets of the Light, Ultraman, and the Dunamists. He is portrayed by Masami Horiuchi (堀内 正美, Horiuchi Masami).
- Tōgō (東郷): A high-ranking officer of TLT, he was among those interrogating the Night Raider in episode 25 and was last seen witnessing the sheer terror of Dark Zagi's rampage. He is portrayed by Kenji Sahara (佐原 健二, Sahara Kenji).
- Koyanagi (小柳) and Sōma (相馬): A pair of high-ranking officers who appeared alongside Tōgō in episode 25. They are portrayed by Kiyozumi Honda (本田 清澄, Honda Kiyozumi) and Shunnosuke Rokude (鹿出 俊之輔, Rokude Shun'nosuke).
- Sara Mizuhara (水原 沙羅, Mizuhara Sara; Movie, 33, 34): An investigator and former BCST researcher from the United States' TLT, she witnessed the battle between Ultraman and The One (formerly her fiancée) 5 years prior to the series and comes back to Japan to investigate the true origin of Nexus. She is portrayed by Kyōko Tōyama (遠山 景織子, Tōyama Kyōko).
- Hayato Kaimoto (海本 隼人, Kaimoto Hayato): A member of TLT North America branch and class A Esper whose ability allows the TLT to contact the Illustrators as a child. His DNA becomes the progenitor to Ren and Illustrator as part of the Prometheus Project (プロメテウス・プロジェクト, Purometeusu Purojekuto), which mass-producing Espers codenamed Promethean Children (プロメテの子, Puromete no Ko) by combining the best DNA of other prodigies. After Ren runs away from Dallas, Kaimoto chased and spied on the boy's final days in Japan as he try to get the Raphael drug to be delivered on time. He was shot down by Ishibori in episode 36 and awakened after discovering that the Night Raider operative is the Unknown Hand all along. He is portrayed by Ryūki Kitaoka (北岡 久貴, Kitaoka Ryūki).

=== Memory Police ===
The Memory Police (メモリーポリス, Memorī Porisu; MP) is a group of secretive operatives in charge of controlling the information of Ultraman and the Space Beasts. Aside from filtering the mass-media and falsify documentations, members can also use flip phone-like device called Memoraser (メモレイサー, Memoreisā) to rid their target's memories of the Ultraman and Space Beasts. This works by suppressing a specified keyword within the target's brain, but can also be removed if they ever encounter the same incident for the second time. Despite their modus operandi helped in suppressing fear among citizens for the Space Beasts to prey upon, it also removed Nexus from his ability to strengthen himself through human bonds. Following the death of Dark Zagi, the Memory Police was disbanded as humanity slowly regained hope to confront the threat of Space Beasts.

- Saya Shutō (首藤 沙耶, Shutō Saya): The leader of Memory Police, she is a realist who believes that ignorance of Space Beast was the best for the citizens. By the time of Dark Zagi's fight with Nexus, Saya smiled upon the citizens cheering for Ultraman as she closes her Memoraser. She is portrayed by Hitomi Hidaka (日高 ひとみ, Hidaka Hitomi).
- Hiroyuki Misawa: See here
- Mizuo Nonomiya (野々宮 瑞生, Nonomiya Mizuo; 25-36): A young operative who was tasked by Matsunaga in observing Ren after his escape from Dallas by posing as his lover. Initially started as an act, she begins to develop genuine affection for him, leading to the Night Raiders' attempt in rescuing him from Matsunaga. She was last seen accompanying Ren in an ambulance. She is portrayed by Tomomi Miyashita (宮下 ともみ, Miyashita Tomomi), who would go on to portray Alien Salome Herodia in Ultra Galaxy Legend Side Story: Ultraman Zero vs. Darklops Zero.

=== Visitors ===
The Visitors (来訪者, Raihō-sha) are a race of advanced aliens that took refuge on Earth since 18 years prior to Ultraman Nexus. Their original form is yet to be seen and usually took the appearance of jellyfishes in the Illustrator's room. They were originally citizens of an unnamed planet from Messier 80, who were under attacked by the Space Beasts. Inspired by Noa's heroics, they replicated the giant into Dark Zagi, but this became their undoing as Zagi went rampant and protected the Space Beasts instead. In order to stop their creation, the Visitors detonated their system's sun and their home world altogether. As they arrived on Earth, the Visitors helped in the foundation of TLT and their technologies. Through the forms of Earth jellyfish, they took residence within the Fortress Freedom's neutrino tank from which they constantly communicating with Illustrator.

In aftermath of The Next's battle in Shinjuku during 2004, the Visitors deploy their creation Lethe to erase the inhabitant's memories and erecting Potential Barriers to prevent the Space Beasts from entering populated areas. In the span of five years however, the Visitor's influence grew weaker, which led to Zagi's infiltration in Lethe.

=== White Sweepers ===
The White Sweepers (ホワイトスイーパー, Howaito Suīpā) are white hazmat suit-wearing troopers whose responsible for cleaning up the remains of Beast cells in the combat field. Aside from wielding machine guns, they are transported through a TLT Transport (TLT輸送機, Tiruto yusō-ki).

Onscreen White Sweepers in episodes 1, 21 and 22 are portrayed by Kōichi Imamura (今村 公一, Imamura Kōichi), Keizō Kawakura (川倉 けいぞう, Kawakura Keizō) and Eiji Yokota (横田 エイジ, Yokota Eiji).

=== Chrome Chesters ===
When fighting against giant Space Beasts, Night Raider members can ride on Chrome Chester (クロムチェスター, Kuromu Chesutā) aircraft units which possesses the Opticamouflage System (オプチカムフラージュシステム, Opuchikamufurāju Shisutemu) to disguise their modus operandi and can transform into various configurations. While only four machines appeared in the entire series, it was mass-produced a year later as TLT (and by extension, the Night Raiders) expanded its ranks.

Known models

- Alpha: A small machine which boasts great speed. It is armed with Spider Missiles (スパイダーミサイル, Supaidā Misairu) and Banisher Laser Cannon (バニッシャーレーザーキャノン, Banisshā Rēzā Kyanon). Usually rode by Komon and Nagi, the latter piloted it herself when Komon received the Delta model. Before Shiori was reassigned to Gamma, she was the initial sole pilot of another Alpha model.
- Beta: A small commander-use machine with greater communication and search purposes. Its purpose is to analyze the battlefield in order to carry out battle plans. It is armed with Mega Lasers (メガレーザー, Mega Rēzā) on both sides of the gyros and the Laser Vulcan (レーザーバルカン, Rēzā Barukan) on the nosecone. Its main pilot is captain Wakura, although Ishibori drove it before the Gamma model's introduction and Nagi during her training period.
- Gamma: Debuted in episode 4, this model is equipped with a large metal generator, high mobility and can perform high speed flight. Its notable trait is a pair of caterpillar treads, one on each wing, and is the main component for each formation. Its armaments are a pair of Metal Lasers (メタルレーザー, Metaru Rēzā) and the Avilock (アビロック, Abirokku) micro missiles. Its main pilots are Shiori and Ishibori, while Nagi replaced the latter during the machine's debut.
- Delta: The last of the Chester models, first appeared in episode 20 as means of independently entering Nexus' Meta Field. Its main armaments are four Quad Blasters (クアドラブラスター, Kuadora Burasutā), each with built-in Hyper Generator Units (ハイパージェネレイターユニット, Haipā Jenereitā Yunitto) and stronger variants of Gamma's Avilock missiles. Komon is the main pilot, but Nagi boarded it in episode 31 and Wakura in the last episode.

Chrome Chester Configurations

Strike Formation (ストライクフォーメーション, Sutoraiku Fōmēshon) is a combination process of the Chrome Chesters to eradicate the Space Beasts. Each combination has different components and formations:

- Strike Chester (ストライクチェスター, Sutoraiku Chesutā): Created from Komon's experience in Nexus' Meta Field during the fight against Pedoleon Guros, it is the combination of Chrome Chesters Alpha, Beta, and Gamma into a fighter jet capable of entering the Meta Field. Through Gamma's Metal Generadar (メタルジェネレーダー, Metaru Jenerēdā), the machine possesses high speed and agility while maintaining sufficient armaments in combat. Its main weapon is the Strike Banisher (ストライクバニッシャー, Sutoraiku Banisshā) beam ray, fired to eradicate Space Beasts in conjunction with Alpha's Spider Missiles and Gamma's Avilock.
- Mega Cannon Chester (メガキャノンチェスター, Mega Kyanon Chesutā; 14, 19, 20): A tank formation for land-based combat. While incredibly lacking in speed and mobility, it is compensated by the two Mega Cannons (メガキャノン, Mega Kyanon) extended from Beta's Mega Lasers, which fires the Mega Cannon Banisher (メガキャノンバニッシャー, Mega Kyanon Banisshā), boasting a 25% rise of output compared to the Strike Chester's Strike Banisher.
- Hyper Strike Chester (ハイパーストライクチェスター, Haipā Sutoraiku Chesutā): A variation of the Strike Chester, with Chrome Chester Delta included, which appeared in episode 24. As its name implies, this machine boasts an improved performance from its predecessor, including a faster entrance into the Meta Field. Based on the data of Jun Himeya during his captivity and experimentation in Fortress Freedom, the aircraft is armed with the Ultimate Banisher (ウルティメットバニッシャー, Urutimetto Banisshā), a beam attack which has the same strength as Nexus Junis' Over Ray Schtrom. All three shots are made by Komon, first against Kutuura, second in a failed attempt to attack Mephisto and the last one was modified to save the weakened Nexus by firing the beam into his Energy Core. The data of the Ultimate Banisher was lost when an unknown spy (Ishibori) hacked the TLT's server. Afterwards, it was replaced by Hyper Strike Banisher (ハイパーストライクバニッシャー, Haipā Sutoraiku Banisshā) during the fight against Megaflash.
- Dig Chester (ディグチェスター, Digu Chesutā): A subterranean combination of Chrome Chesters Alpha, Beta, and Gamma. This formation never made it into the series despite its existence confirmed by Tsuburaya Productions.

=== Other terminologies ===
- Fortress Freedom (フォートレスフリーダム, Fōtoresu Furīdamu): A hydroelectric dam found in the mountainous Kanto region (eastern Japan) which is actually a front to the base of TLT-J. It was portrayed by the Miyagase Dam in real-life.
- Sea of Oblivion Lethe (忘却の海 レーテ, Bōkyaku no Umi Rēte): The Visitor's creation, a massive memory erasing device which can render the entire population amnesiac and controlling mass-media from the information of Ultraman and Space Beast. Due to its massive size, an activation requires the power of Visitors and this cause them to be weakened. For five years, Lethe erected the Potential Barriers (ポテンシャルバリア, Potensharu Baria) in populated areas around the world, including the Fortress Freedom and the facility that held it. However, constant Beast attacks on urban area since Megaflash's arrival caused it to be weakened. In the final episode, Lethe was prepared to be launched again until Ishibori reveal himself as Zagi and provoked Nagi to transform into Nexus, causing the machine to absorb her intense hatred and Nexus' light for Zagi to return to power. Komon would dive into the darkness to save Nagi, allowing Nexus to broke free and destroy the machine. This action caused the originally repressed memories by TLT to resurface as humanity regain hope in against the Space Beast attacks.

== The Dark Giants ==
The Dark Giants (闇の巨人, Yami no Kyojin) were the adversaries of Ultraman Nexus, whose appearances resemble an Ultraman. Each had a human host designated as Dark Dunamist (暗黒適能者, Ankoku Tekinōsha), but neither of them were counted as actual ones. Although much of their characteristic remain unknown, they emitted an opposite wavelength to Ultraman Nexus.

A common ability for them is to deploy a dark pocket dimension called Dark Field (ダークフィールド, Dāku Fīrudo), which neutralizes Nexus' Meta-Field and caused disruption in radio waves. It also empowers both Dark Giants and Space Beasts alike while preventing Nexus from exerting his full power.

=== Dark Zagi ===
The Evil God of Destruction Dark Zagi (邪悪なる暗黒破壊神 ダークザギ, Jaakunaru Ankoku Hakai-shin Dāku Zagi; 34, 37) is the major antagonist of ULTRA N PROJECT, as well as the final villain in Ultraman Nexus. Alternatively, he is also known as Dark Side Noa (ダークサイドノア, Dāku Saido Noa), due to his resemblance to Ultraman Noa and Unknown Hand (アンノウンハンド, Annōn Hando) by TLT before his cover was blown.

Dark Zagi was originally a biological weapon created by the Visitors in the likeness of Ultraman Noa as their protector from Space Beast assaults. Designated Ultinoid Zagi (ウルティノイド・ザギ, Urutinoido Zagi), he was equipped with a self-evolution program which allows him to counter the Space Beasts' ability to grow stronger upon predation. Zagi was awakened with a distorted awareness and went rogue from the revelation that he is a mere imitation of Ultraman Noa. The Visitors try to destroy their creation by self-detonating their home world, but this created a black hole which Zagi exploited to invade the Land of Light, fighting against the Space Garrisons before Noa dragged him back. After an intense battle between the two giants, Dark Zagi lost his physical body while Noa was devolved into The Next due to sealing the aforementioned black hole.

Zagi arrived on Earth in 1991 as he possessed Hajime Yamaoka (山岡 一, Yamaoka Hajime) and killed the members of his research team, save for the young Nagi to plant hatred into her. In the early days of the Night Raiders, Zagi joined the group as their analyzer and bio-weapon expert Mitsuhiko Ishibori (石堀 光彦, Ishibori Mitsuhiko) to spy on Nagi's development. It was also from this point that he corrupted Mizorogi into Dark Mephisto and killing Riko as a host for Dark Faust. Four years after Beast the One's destruction, Ishibori continues to strengthen Nexus through his fight with Space Beasts while actively supporting said monsters after the deaths of his Dark Giants. During Ren's final days as a Dunamist, Ishibori created Ezmael as the final push to strengthen Nexus. As the light chose Nagi, he dropped his cover and attacked the entire TLT facility before provoking the former into Nexus and him absorbing its power. Restored to his original form, Dark Zagi marched his way on Shinjuku while facing Nexus on his forms before said hero restored to his original form, Noa, turning the tides of the battle as Dark Zagi exploded during a beam struggle on Earth's orbit.

In the form of Mitsuhiko Ishibori, the Unknown Hand is capable of maintaining his human shell's youthful appearance for almost 2 decades and utilizing the skills of a hacker. He still maintain his original powers, such as remotely deploying Dark Field G (ダークフィールドG, Dāku Fīrudo Jī) to secure or empowering a Space Beast's regenerative factor or creating other Dark Giants. As Dark Zagi, he possessed all twisted counterparts of Ultraman Noa's techniques, including his own finisher Lightning Zagi (ライトニング・ザギ, Raitoningu Zagi). The lack of Noa Aegis and his color schemes are his only distinction from his rival and his mere presence can cause a simultaneous global-scale Beast attack.

Mitsuhiko Ishibori/Hajime Yamaoka is portrayed by Kosei Kato (加藤 厚成, Katō Kōsei), who also voiced Dark Zagi. In a scrapped planning, the last episode would have included a fight between Noa and Zagi in outer space.

=== Dark Faust ===
Red Giant of Death Dark Faust (赤き死の巨人 ダークファウスト, Akaki shi no Kyojin Dāku Fausuto) is a clown-themed female Dark Giant, as well as Himeya's first adversary during his active period as Nexus.

A year prior to Ultraman Nexus, Komon's kind-hearted artist girlfriend Riko Saida (斉田 リコ, Saida Riko) was ambushed by the Space Beast Nosferu, who killed the rest of her family members. Mizorogi killed her on the spot as Dark Faust assimilated with her to revive the girl. Since then, Riko lives a delusional life wherein her family members were still alive as Dark Faust occasionally surfaced to fight Nexus. The Dark Ultra had fought Nexus on two occasions to support the Space Beasts Bugbuzun and Lafleya. By the time Riko discovered her double life and the fact that she shared her injuries with Faust, the Dark Ultra gained full control of her body and engaged in a final fight with Nexus until Riko's consciousness resurfaced. When Nosferu attempted to kill Komon, Riko/Faust shielded him at the cost of her own before Nexus opened fire with Cross-Ray Schtrom. Riko dissipated into light as Komon took a long time to recover.

Dark Faust's main ability is to corrupt Nexus' Meta-Field with her Dark Field and absorb the Ultra's own light energy. Her finisher is Dark-Ray Jabirom (ダークレイ・ジャビローム, Dāku Rei Jabirōmu).

Dark Faust is voiced by Tetsu Inada (稲田 徹, Inada Tetsu) and Riko Saida is portrayed by Shion Nakamaru (中丸 シオン, Nakamaru Shion). The revelation of Faust's true gender as female was only highlighted in the magazine but design, voice and action wise were purposely portrayed to resemble otherwise.

=== Dark Mephisto ===
Black Demon Dark Mephisto (黒い悪魔 ダークメフィスト, Kuroi Akuma Dāku Mefisuto) (Note: Name is also romanized as "Dark Mephist".) is the second Dark Giant in the series to appear and took over Faust's role in antagonizing Nexus after her demise. He is themed after the Grim Reaper, with visible motifs of rib cage and spine.

His human host is Shinya Mizorogi (溝呂木 眞也, Mizorogi Shinya), a former sub-captain of Night Raider and former accomplice of Nagi, who originally received the dream of ancient ruins that most of Nexus' Dunamists experienced. During one mission, Shinya and Nagi formed a pact to kill each other should any of them brainwashed into a Beast Human but while separated, he was contacted by Dark Mephisto, who sway Mizorogi to his side. Ever since then, Mizorogi disappeared and overseer the Space Beast attacks, including the murder of Riko Saida under his master (Unknown Hand)'s request.

In the present day, Mizorogi/Mephisto try to sway Komon and Nagi to his side through various manipulation and mind games, but failed an instead delivering psychological attack to his foes, including Nexus and a young boy. He would later kidnap Himeya's colleague as a leverage for the Ultraman as he was killed by Kutuura in the Land of Dead. Before he could absorb Nexus' light to empower himself, the Night Raiders attacked him and revived the Ultra to full power. Nexus and Mephisto fought in a heated battle that ended with both sides seemingly perish. Mizorogi survived but remain amnesiac and lost his ability to become Mephisto. After being arrested by TLT to dissect the secret of an Ultra's power, Mizorogi escaped the facility with his memories returned and was shot in the back by Memory Police member Misawa, who becomes the new Mephisto. Wanting to redeem himself, Mizorogi's willpower allows him to transform for one final time into the original Dark Mephisto and grabbed his clone for Nexus Junis Blue to finish him. In his dying breath, Mizorogi apologized to Nagi and reveal that the Unknown Hand is among their ranks.

Mizorogi transforms into Dark Mephisto with the Dark Evolver (ダークエボルバー, Dāku Eborubā) naginata, which can also be used to fire vacuum bullets in human form. As Dark Mephisto, he retained the use of ESP from his human form and is armed with the Armed Mephisto (アームドメフィスト, Āmudo Mefisuto) from his right hand, allowing him to erect the Dark Field with Dark Shift Wave (ダークシフトウェーブ, Dāku Shifuto Uēbu) on his own or exuding Mephisto Claw (メフィストクロー, Mefisuto Kurō) for melee combat. His finishing move is Dark-Ray Schtrom (ダークレイ・シュトローム, Dāku Rei Shutorōmu), which had the same strength as Nexus Junis' Over-Ray Schtrom. After his seeming demise from the final battle with Himeya, Mizorogi regains the ability to transform into Mephisto by absorbing nearby lights, signifying his redemption before death.

Shinya Mizorogi is portrayed by Mitsutoshi Shundō (俊藤 光利, Shundō Mitsutoshi). Dark Mephisto was originally meant to have a separate voice actor until Takeshi Yagi chooses to have Mitsutoshi's voice being altered for the Dark Ultra.

=== Dark Mephisto (Zwei) ===
Black Demon Dark Mephisto (Zwei) (黒い悪魔 ダークメフィスト（ツヴァイ）, Kuroi Akuma Dāku Mefisuto (Tsuvai)) (Note: Also read as "Dark Mephist <Zwei>") is a copy of Dark Mephisto created by Unknown Hand as he possessed the Memory Police officer Hiroyuki Misawa (三沢 広之, Misawa Hiroyuki; 11, 13, 16, 29DC & 32). Hiroyuki ambushed Mizorogi in his attempt to run from TLT's Fortress Freedom and transformed to attack Nagi, Komon and Yayoi. As he managed to overpower Nexus Junis Blue, Mizorogi joined the fray as the original Mephisto to fight his clone before giving an opening for Nexus to finish both of them.

As with the original Mephisto, Misawa can transform with his own Dark Evolver. While physically identical to his predecessor, Zwei's initial black eyes turned red and displayed abilities that are superior to the original Mephisto, including Dark Phalanx (ダークファランクス, Dāku Farankusu), Burst Cluster (バーストクラスター, Bāsuto Kurasutā), Dark Flame (ダークフレイム, Dāku Fureimu) and the ability to siphon Nexus' energy through his Energy Core.

Hiroyuki Misawa is portrayed by Yoshito Takeuchi (竹内 義人, Takeuchi Yoshito).

=== Dark Lucifer ===
Dark Lucifer (ダークルシフェル, Dāku Rushiferu) is the final Dark Giant of the ULTRA N PROJECT, who appeared in Dreams, a novel bundled with the DVD release of Ultraman Nexus in 2012. Masquerading as a retired Memory Police officer, Lucifer begins erasing his targets of their memories being attacked by Space Beasts. The Memoraser he wielded also double as his transformation item and fight against Ultraman Noa, whose bonded to both Komon and Nagi.

Dark Lucifer is actually one of the unused concept as a result of Ultraman Nexus being put to an abrupt end. Its appearance is based on the Divine Comedy, with masks of Dark Faust and Mephisto on each side of his neck. The original concept was for Dark Lucifer to be Mitsuhiko Ishibori's transformed state instead of his creator, Dark Zagi. Additionally, Lucifer would have taken up the role of the second last boss of the series, which was given to the combined Space Beast, Ezmael.

== Other characters ==
=== Minor characters in Ultraman 2004 film ===
- Yōko Maki (真木 蓉子, Maki Yōko): Shunichi's 29 year old wife. She is portrayed by Nae Yūki (裕木 奈江, Yūki Nae).
- Tsugumu Maki (真木 継夢, Maki Tsugumu): Maki's 6 year old terminally ill son, who has only a year left to live. His wish is to fly with his father. He is portrayed by Ryōhei Hirota (広田 亮平, Hirota Ryōhei).
- Takeshi Kurashima (倉島 剛, Kurashima Takeshi): Maki's colleague in the Air Force. He led a squadron of McDonnell Douglas F-15 Eagle in against The One (Beelzebua Corounne) to free The Next from its grasp. He is portrayed by Toshiya Nagasawa (永澤 俊矢, Nagasawa Toshiya).
- Sogabe (曽我部): The head of Bioterror Counter Science and Tactics (対バイオテロ研究機関, Tai Baiotero Kenkyū Kikan; BCST) and aged 45 years old. Like Sarah, he also view Maki/The Next as a dangerous existence comparable to The One. He is portrayed by Daisuke Ryu (隆 大介, Ryū Daisuke), who is known for the role of Kazuma Asuka in Ultraman Dyna.
- Manjōme (万城目): The 46 year old president of Hoshikawa Airlines (星川航空, Hoshikawa Kōkū) and Maki's employer. He is portrayed by Masao Kusakari (草刈 正雄, Kusakari Masao).
- Ippei (一平) and Yuriko (由利子): Hoshikawa Airlines' maintenance staff and mechanic respectively, both of them and their employer Manjōme show great care towards Yōko. They are portrayed by Eisuke Tsunoda (角田 英介, Tsunoda Eisuke) and Yumiko Satō (佐藤 夕美子, Satō Yumiko), while having their names being revolved around the main characters of Ultra Q.
- Yashiro (矢代): The head of BSCT's special force, he led his forces in an attempt to attack The One (Idorobia), but failed and blamed Mizuhara for the fall of his squad. He is portrayed by Kazuya Shimizu (清水 一哉, Shimizu Kazuya).

=== Recurring characters in Ultraman Nexus ===
- Sera (セラ; 5, 24): A little girl from Himeya's past, who lives in a war-torn nation of Southeast Asia. Having lost her parents, she made her living by carrying food and water to the nearby village. When Himeya visited the country and injured, she nursed him to health as the two developed a sibling-like bond. As Himeya was capturing photos in a war, Sera was injured as her death accidentally photographed in his camera. Himeya's photos went on to receive public attention but Sera's death continued to traumatize him, to the point of viewing his duty as a Dunamist being punishments for failures. During Nexus' death in episode 24, Sera's spirit paid a visit, finally allowing Himeya to move on from his past in a renewed determination before engaging in a final fight with Mephisto. Sera is portrayed by Mai Tanaka (田中 舞, Tanaka Mai).
- Jinzou Negoro (根来 甚蔵, Negoro Jinzō): Himeya's colleague and a freelance journalist who wished to foil the government conspiracy after the Beast attacks created a huge number of reported incidents. In an incident with Golgolem, Negoro published Horokusa's photos under his own name and was on the run from Memory Police until he came across a trio of conspiracy theorists. His memory was wiped out by TLT after Himeya's final fight with Mephisto. He is portrayed by Hiroshi Ōkochi (大河内 浩, Ōkōchi Hiroshi).
- Megumi Sakuta (佐久田 恵, Sakuta Megumi): Himeya's senior reporter. After tending Himeya's injuries at some point of time, she was kidnapped by Mizorogi as a leverage for Nexus and witnessed Himeya's final battle with Mephisto. Likewise, her memory was erased afterwards with her encounter with Himeya was removed as well. She is portrayed by Tomoko Kawashima (川嶋 朋子, Kawashima Tomoko).
- Naoichi Harisu (針巣 直市, Harisu Naoichi): A restaurant manager in an amusement park who hired Ren after finding the boy sleeping nearby the park. He is portrayed by Eiichi Kikuchi (きくち 英一, Kikuchi Eiichi), whose popular for the role of Ultraman Jack from The Return of Ultraman.
- Takashi Ojiro (尾白 高志, Ojiro Takashi): Ren's coworker at the amusement park, his family owned a construction company. He is portrayed by Kei Suzuki (鈴木 圭, Suzuki Kei).

=== Guest characters in Ultraman Nexus ===
- Rina Sugiyama (杉山 里奈, Sugiyama Rina; 7, 8): A young girl who was caught in between the crossfire of Bugbuzun and the Night Raiders in an abandoned factory. After being rescued, her memories were erased by the Memory Police. She is portrayed by Natsumi Yamada (山田 夏海, Yamada Natsumi).
- Saida family (4, 11, 12): The family members of Riko Saida. Although the patriarch (age 50) is unnamed, the matriarch and younger brother are Noriko Saida (斎田 典子, Saida Noriko; age 47) and Takashi Saida (斎田 隆, Saida Takashi; age 18). Initially seemed as a relatively normal family, in truth they were murdered by Nosferu a year prior to the series, while Riko was killed by Mizorogi for Faust to possess her. Riko since then lives her delusional life believing that the Saida family were still alive until she breaks down from discovering the truth. They are portrayed by Shinji Yamaguchi (山口 眞司, Yamaguchi Shinji), Sumiko Motoi (元井 須美子, Motoi Sumiko) and Shingo Mizuno (水野 真吾, Mizuno Shingo).
- Riko Yamamura (山邑 理子, Yamamura Riko; 13, 14, 29): A little girl who becomes a victim of Mizorogi's game when he transformed her parents into Beast Humans and put her in a hostage crisis situation within Nosferu's forehead. She survived the monster's destruction but was gravely injured and had her memory erased by Memory Police. However, there was an error in the Memoraser which caused her trauma to be relived and the rest of the memories erased, turning her into antisocial. After living with her cousin, Riko found Mizorogi by accident as they evade Banpira before he was captured by the White Sweepers. She demonstrated the ability to see through Nexus' Meta Field during his fight with Banpira before she regained her previous memories. She is portrayed by Ayame Koike (小池 彩夢, Koike Ayame).
- Kaoru Yamamura (山邑 薫, Yamamura Kaoru; 13, 14, 29): A young boy who was forced to witness his little sister's hostage crisis set up by Mizorogi and Nosferu. When Night Raiders accidentally injured Riko with their Chrome Chesters, a maddened Kaoru lashes at Komon before he was taken away by the Memory Police. He is portrayed by Yūshi Nakano (中野 勇士, Nakano Yūshi).
- Hiroshi Yamamura (山邑 博, Yamamura Hiroshi) and Ryōko Yamamura (山邑 涼子, Yamamura Ryōko) (13, 14, 29): The parents of the Yamamura siblings. After being attacked by Nosferu, they turned into its Beast Humans, causing them to feed on wood and growing a set of talons. They captured Riko to be used as a hostage for Nosferu on its forehead, causing the Night Raiders to kill it without knowing the true situation. The Yamamura parents were labelled deceased as part of TLT's cover-up, while Riko remembered her parents for the first time in episode 29. They are portrayed by Shin Asuka (飛鳥 信, Asuka Shin) and Satoko Okamoto (岡本 さと子, Okamoto Satoko).
- Horokusa (保呂草; 19): A cameraman who was killed by Golgolem. His pictures of Golgolem and the Chrome Chesters were taken by Negoro to be published in a newspaper under his own name. His death was falsified as falling from a cliff while under alcohol influence by TLT members. Yasufumi Hayashi (林 泰文, Hayashi Yasufumi).
- Junpei (潤平; 19, 20): A junior cameraman whose the subject of Horokusa's rant. Even after his coworker's falsified death, Junpei view him as his inspiration as a cameraman. Masahiko Katayama (片山 雅彦, Katayama Masahiko).
- Nanaka (七夏; 19, 20): A gravure idol working under Horokusa. Her memory of the Space Beast was erased by TLT's Memory Police. She is portrayed by Rei Yoshii (吉井 怜, Yoshii Rei).
- Taichirō Yamada (山田 太一郎, Yamada Taichirō), Yasushi Aono (青野 康, Aono Yasushi) and Takeo Hirokawa (広川 武雄, Hirokawa Takeo) (22-24): A trio of conspiracy theorists who assisted Negoro in hiding from Memory Police after being astonished by Horokusa's photographs of Space Beasts and Golgolem. Whereas Negoro was captured and stripped of his memories by Memory Police, what happened to the trio is unknown. They are portrayed by Satoru Saitō (斉藤 暁, Saitō Satoru), Ryōta Satō (佐藤 亮太, Satō Ryōta) and Isao Nonaka (野仲 イサオ, Nonaka Isao).
- Satomi Yamamura (山邑 理美, Yamamura Satomi; 29): The Yamamura siblings' cousin, who took care of them as an older sister figure. She attended middle school. Honami Tajima (田島 穂奈美, Tajima Honami).
- Hazuki Matsunaga (松永 葉月, Matsunaga Hazuki; 33, 34): Aged 18 years old and Yoichiro Matsunaga's only daughter, the two had a strained relationship due to her father's work in TLT. Spotting Ren in one of her father's files, she decided to meet the boy in person and had him confess his feelings to Mizuo. Having been a spectator of Megaflash's assault, she mended her relationship with her father but was cut short after the Memory Police erased her encounter with said monster. She is portrayed by Yūka Sugisaki (杉咲 侑果, Sugisaki Yūka).
- Shigeki Takatsuki (高槻 茂樹, Takatsuki Shigeki; EX): An old friend of Shiori from her time as a police officer, Takatsuki tried to propose his love for Shiori but was cut short when an Arakunia attacked the police department's cafeteria and was rendered amnesiac by Memory Police. Although retaining his job as an officer, Takatsuki instead develop affection for Akiko, Shiori's own best friend. At one point, Takatsuki found himself in the middle of TLT's fight against Bugbuzun Broods. His reunion with Shiori restored his lost memories, which was rendered moot once more after the battle. He is portrayed by Shigeki Kagemaru (影丸 茂樹, Kagemaru Shigeki), who previously known for portraying Tetsuo Shinjoh in Ultraman Tiga.
- Akiko Omote (表 秋子, Omote Akiko; EX): Shiori's best friend, who becomes the target of Bugbuzun Brood after one of them threw their scent into her. She is portrayed by Erika Miyamoto (宮本 えりか, Miyamoto Erika).

== Space Beasts ==
The Space Beasts (スペースビースト, Supēsu Bīsuto) are extraterrestrial monsters that served as major antagonists of ULTRA N PROJECT. They are capable of growing rapidly by obtaining information and feed on the fears of intellectual life forms. Due to this, they naturally prey on human beings. Each individual emits Beast Oscillation Wave (ビースト振動波, Bīsuto Shindō-ha) from internal organs to share information, and can evolve to fight against their enemies. The Dark Giants, including Unknown Hand can manipulate then and strengthen a Space Beast with the Dark Field.

Their true identity are extraterrestrial life forms that ravaged the Messier 80, the Visitors' home world. The Beast Oscillation Waves resonated with the fears of intelligent life forms which gave birth to these monsters. Although the threat of Space Beast were reduced through Noa's presence, the Visitors' anti-Beast weapon Ultinoid Zagi went rogue and enhanced the Beast, endangering their home planet once more. To erase their mistake, they try to detonate their planet to destroy both the Beasts and their creation, but said monsters were reduced to X Neutrino by Zagi's hand and fell on Earth.

According to Sara Mizuhara, since the Beasts prey on human fear, their presence would be shrouded by the TLT, as massive outbreak by citizens would signify the end of the Earth. Potential Barriers were erected by the Visitors in populated area to prevent these monsters from trespassing, but continuous appearance of Megaflash, Galberos and Ezmael in Aoba New Town caused the barriers to be weakened. Furthermore, Space Beasts continued to appear even after Zagi's demise, but its threat had been significantly under control by the expanded TLT.

The Space Beasts are designed by Yasushi Torisawa. As the last season Ultraman Cosmos emphasizes coexistence with monsters, the Space Beasts are incapable of coexisting with others and needed to be destroyed. Apart from that, the resemblance of Space Beasts in Nexus are also compared to Beast the One. Since the show had budget constraints, most appearing Space Beasts are modifications from past monster suits of Ultra Series. As a creature incapable of coexisting with humans, the Space Beasts are not treated as "monsters", but as "alien life forms".

- Beast the One (ビースト・ザ・ワン, Bīsuto Za Wan; Movie): The first Space Beast that Noa fought on Earth as Ultraman the Next. An intelligent Space Beast that was summoned by Dark Zagi to Earth and assimilated with a marine officer named Takafumi Udō (有働 貴文, Udō Takafumi). Having killed Takafumi's co-workers, Beast was detained by B.S.C.T. until it escaped and slaughtering soldiers who stand on its way. As Ultraman the Next also arrived on Earth, Beast went to fight the Ultra until he retreated to the sewers of Shinjuku, wherein both monsters and Ultra faced in a battle that determined the fate of the city. His destruction by Ultraman the Next caused its cells to be scattered and merged with various animals and plants into future Space Beasts, with Nosferu, Galberos and Lizarias being its subject. By itself, Beast the One naturally had the ability to assimilate with Earth creatures to evolve into stronger forms. Beast the One is voiced by Katsuyuki Konishi (小西 克幸, Konishi Katsuyuki), while Takafumi is portrayed by Kenya Ōsumi (大澄 賢也, Ōsumi Ken'ya).
  - Idolovia (イドロビア, Idorobia): The first evolved form obtained by absorbing marine life forms. Idorobia is capable of climbing onto ceiling structures like lizards. Attracted by the light of The Next, The One marched its way to the B.S.C.T.'s hidden facility as the soldiers open fire with modified anesthesia. Unfortunately for them, Idorobia had developed resistance in an instant before evolving into Reptilia.
  - Reptilia (レプティリア, Reputiria): Idorobia's evolved form by absorbing lizards and geckos. Having shrugged off the anesthesia bullets used to shoot him with, Beast the One proceed to slaughter all available soldiers in that facility until Maki saved Sara during his transformation as Ultraman the Next. Both 10-meter-tall (33 ft) giants fight evenly matched before the One retreated to the sewers in Shinjuku. His attempt to guilt trip Sara with Takafumi's appearance failed with Maki intervening.
  - Beelzebua (ベルゼブア, Beruzebua): Obtained by absorbing rats from the sewers. Growing to the size of 50 meters, the One proceed to unleash his reign of terror upon Shinjuku before the Next further evolve into Junis, who grows into the same height as well.
  - Beelzebua Korone (ベルゼブア・コローネ, Beruzebua Korōne): An extension of Beelzebua by absorbing crows, growing a pair of wings. Beelzebua try to take their fight on air and managed to absorb his rival's energy. With the help of the air force, the Next attacks and sliced Beelzebua's wings as the monster fell into the ground and was last seen dispersed by the Next's Evol Ray Schtrom.
- Blob-type Beast Pedoleon (ブロブタイプビースト ペドレオン, Burobu Taipu Bīsuto Pedoreon; 1-4, 37): The first Space Beast to appear in Ultraman Nexus.
  - Kurain (クライン, Kurain; 1, 2, 4, 12): The original form of Pedoleon, a single member try to attack a gas station until the Night Raiders arrived. Another one was targeting a bus full of passengers and once a defenseless Komon was about to be eaten like the rest, Nexus crushed it with his fist. When feeding on several factory workers, the attack from Night Raiders forced the surviving members to fuse into Guros. After the first Guros' destruction, several more Kurain would march its way to a nearby tunnel to merge into another Guros within an hour. In episode 12, several Kurain appeared as illusions when Komon was under influence of a Beast cell until Himeya expelled it from the former.
  - Furigen (フリーゲン, Furīgen; 3, 4,): Pedoleon Guros' transformed form (see below). In the final episode, several smaller and silver-colored Furigen attacked the citizens as the A Unit of Night Raider fought them a year after Zagi's demise.
  - Guros (グロース, Gurōsu; 2-4): The combined form of Pedoleon Kurain. Guros fought against Nexus Anphans and secreted kerosene gas from its back to prevent Night Raiders from firing. It assumed Furigen and try to approach the urban area but Nexus trapped it within the Meta Field halfway and destroy it. Another Guros was created by several Kurain merging within a tunnel while feeding the passengers within their cars. Having obtained info from its predecessor's demise, this Guros developed the ability to fire homing energy balls through the gas it previously consumed and unleashes volts of electricity. Having escaped the attacks from Chrome Chester Alpha and Beta, Furigen try attack Gamma (Komon) before Nexus saved him and brought them into the Meta-Field. After disorienting Guros with Nexus Hurricane, Nexus Junis destroyed it with Over-Ray Schtrom.
- Insect-type Beast (インセクトタイプビースト, Insekuto Taipu Bīsuto)
  - Beesectar (ビーセクタ, Bīsekuta; 5): A swarm of locusts that appear in Himeya's dream. In the actual planning, the Beesectars were meant to combine into the giant Space Beast Bugbuzun. There are also plans in reintroducing them during Megaflash's arc.
  - Bugbuzun (バグバズン, Bagubazun; 5, 7, 8): A Space Beast born from a Beast Cell attached to a beetle who prey upon drivers and several humans in a parking lot at a nearby carnival. With both sharp mouth at his head and at the end of its tail, as well as durable hide, it was able to fend itself against Nexus. With the Night Raiders' Chrome Chesters fighting both giants, Bugbuzun try to escape before the Ultra fired its wings, forcing the monster to go underground. At some point of time, Bugbuzun attacked an abandoned factory and prey upon several graffiti artist. As Bugbuzun approaches Komon and Sugiyama, the Space Beasts reveal itself and frozen by the Night Raiders' Divait Launchers. Nagi proceed to fire a napalm grenade which destroyed the monster altogether.
  - Bugbuzun Grolar (バグバズングローラー, Bagubazun Gurōrā; EX): An evolved variant of the Bugbuzun, it sent out several Broods to prey upon human victims while Grolar would feast on its smaller divisions. Ren transforms into Nexus and fight the monster as Unknown Hand unleashed his Dark Field G to turn the tides of the battle, only for Nexus Junis Blue to absorb the field's own energy to end Grolar's reign of terror.
  - Bugbuzun Brood (バグバズンブルード, Bagubazun Burūdo; EX): Smaller divisions of Bugbuzun Grolar, the Broods took upon human-sized forms disguised as hooded men and feeds on unsuspecting victims. With the ability to modify Beast Vibration Waves, they can turn themselves undetectable to Night Raiders and creating 16 disappearance cases within a week. One of them targeted Shiori's old colleagues and threw their scent before Ren intercepted it. The Unknown Hand however bath the single Brood with Dark Field G into a giant for Nexus to fight with. As the colleague still had the Bugbuzun's scent, another Brood would target her until Komon damaged its head. This caused its Beast Vibration Wave to be unmasked and allows the Night Raiders to find its source (Grolar).
- Fiendish-type Beast (フィンディッシュタイプビースト, Findisshu Taipu Bīsuto)
  - Galberos (ガルベロス, Garuberosu; 6, 17, 18, 35): A cerberus-themed Space Beast created when the nucleus from Beast the One's Beast Cell infected a dog. Galberos was summoned to an ancient ruins where Jun Himeya fought and destroy it as Ultraman Nexus' first opponent. Initially thought to be from Himeya's dream, Galberos was revived in the modern day by Mizorogi to turn several campers into Beast Humans while fighting against Nexus and the Night Raiders. Galberos use its hypnosis to disable them while injuring Nexus' arm before disappearing. In its next reappearance, Galberos gained the advantage on Nexus due to Mizorogi's interference until Nagi fired upon him, allowing the Ultra to finish the monster once and for all. As Ren was fighting against Megaflash, a second Galberos was summoned to assist the nautilus Space Beast until it became the receiving end of Schtrom Sword. Galberos' remains was salvaged by the Unknown Hand and becomes the central body for Ezmael. The second Galberos from episode 35 had its suit modified as a distinction from the original.
  - Nosferu (ノスフェル, Nosuferu; 11-16): A rodent Space Beast with the Tissue Regenerative Organ (組織再生器官, Soshiki Saisei Kikan) on its neck to heal damages from cellular levels. A year prior, Nosferu was responsible for the deaths of Saida family under directions of Unknown Hand while Mizorogi shoots Riko for the vessel of Dark Faust. In the present day, the monster grew from 5 meters into a giant and first appeared fighting Nexus Junis in place of Faust. When Riko's consciousness awoke, she used Faust's body to shield Komon from the monster's own claws, allowing Nexus to defeat Nosferu with Cross Ray Schtrom while Riko died from her injuries. Nosferu however revived itself and assaulted the Yamamura family to turn the parents into Beast Humans, which led to their daughter Riko held hostage within Nosferu's forehead. As part of Mizorogi's twisted game, Nosferu was killed by the Night Raiders' Chrome Chester with Riko still inside while Nexus was pre-occupied with Dark Mephisto. However, Nosferu was revived as its original 5 meter form and attacked a factory and its workers while Komon's hesitation allow it to escape. Somewhere nearby Negoro's secret base, Nosferu grew giant to intercept the Night Raiders. With Nexus' help, the regenerative organ was exposed long enough for Komon to open fire, allowing Nexus Junis to finish it with Over Ray Schtrom.
  - Kutuura (クトゥーラ, Kutoūra; 22-24): A marine life-themed Space Beast with appearance based on Edvard Munch's The Scream. Kutuura's original location is the Grotesque Sea (異形の海, Igyō no umi) and utilized dimensional portals to create six cases of disappearances under Mizorogi's request to lure the Night Raider. With Sakuta being held hostage, Kutuura defeated and crucify Nexus for Mizorogi to harness its power. The Night Raiders arrived and used the Ultimate Vanisher to kill Kutuura as Himeya's will resurrected Nexus from his death.
  - Ezmael (イズマエル, Izumaeru; 36): A combination of all Space Beasts that Nexus fought since the past, with Galberos as the main body. (Note: According to the designer, Ezmael is the second Galberos combined with all existing Space Beasts while returning to the image of Beast the One.) Ezmael rampaged in Aoba New Town to further weaken the Visitor's Potential Barriers and pressuring Ren's already weakened condition. The monster pummeled Nexus with all of the components of the Space Beasts before Nexus Junis Blue combined his finisher into Over Arrow Ray Schtrom. Despite its destruction, the Unknown revealed that Ezmael is yet another stepping stone for Nexus empower himself. Despite being impressed by the Space Beast's design, suit actor Kazunori Yokoo complained that maintaining the suit was the hardest he endured.
- Bloom-type Beast Lafleya (ブルームタイプビースト ラフレイア, Burūmu Taipu Bīsuto Rafureia; 9, 10): A raflessia-like Space Beast which can secrete flammable gases that also burns human flesh when in contact with its victims. After killing a trio of illegal dumpers, Lafleya and Faust fought Nexus in a Dark Field before retreating. The next day, The fight resumed as usual before the Night Raiders interfered again, this time firing upon the monster's own weak spot. Faust retreated from Lafelya's destruction while Nexus Junis managed to save the Night Raiders in the last minute. It is based on Biollante from Godzilla vs. Biollante and Gavora from Ultraman.
- Beast Human (ビーストヒューマン, Bīsuto Hyūman; 14, 17, 18): Human corpses revived into the slaves of Space Beasts upon coming in contact with Beast Cells. Each varies per Space Beasts:
  - Nosferu: Nosferu's breeds were the Yamamura parents who turned into a hybrid of the Space Beast itself, causing them to feed on woods and grew longer talons. They were sacrificed to entrap their daughter, Riko, into Nosferu's forehead.
  - Galberos: A quartet of college students became as feral as canines and were shot down by Night Raiders with anesthesia bullets.
  - Dark Mephisto: As presented in Mizorogi's past, the early Night Raiders fought against zombified humans manipulated by Dark Mephisto to lure Mizorogi into forming a pact with him.
- Insectivore-type Beast Arakunia (インセクティボラタイプビースト アラクネア, Insekutibora Taipu Bīsuto Arakunea; 18): An ant/termite-like Beast with heightened sense of smell and hearing at the cost of vision. It also possesses a prehensile tail and burrows underground. From Captain Wakura's recollection, Arakunia were a pair of Space Beast that the Night Raiders fought in their past. When the Night Raiders killed the first one, the other was sensed by Nagi and Mizorogi, which the latter proceed to open fire. In Shiori's past, a 3-meter-tall Arakunia attacked her police department before the Night Raiders exterminate it.
- Amphibian-type Beast Frogros (アンフィビアタイプビースト フログロス, Anfibian Taipu Bīsuto Furogurosu; 18): A Space Beast from Mizorogi's past, it stands on the height of 10 meters and was killed by the Night Raiders.
- Invisible-type Beast Golgolem (インビジブルタイプビースト ゴルゴレム, Inbishiburu Taipu Bīsuto Gorugoremu; 19-21): A quadrupedal Beast which uses a combination of its back crystals to become intangible/entering different phase and Golgolem Proboscis (ゴルゴレムプロボセス, Gorugoremu Purobosesu) from its mouth to feed on humans. Having escaped Nexus and the Chrome Chesters after feeding on some hikers, Golgolem fell in a trap set by TLT to destroy its crystals, causing it to become vulnerable. However, the operation was interrupted due to Horokusa and his crew's involvement as Golgolem devour Horokusa and forced the Night Raider to retreat upon the regeneration of its crystals. With the Chrome Chester Delta, Komon managed to enter the same phase as Golgolem to bring it into the real world while the Mega Cannon Chester fired their attacks. As Golgolem managed to reduce the attack and regenerated once more, an injured Himeya was forced to transform and bring the Beast to Meta-Field. Before Golgolem can escape, Nexus Junis pull it away from the portal and finish it with Over-Ray Schtrom.
- Crustacean-type Beast Grantella (クラスティシアンタイプビースト グランテラ, Kurusutishian Taipu Bīsuto Gurantera; 25-28): A Scorpion-themed Space Beast and Ren's first opponent during his debut as Ultraman Nexus. Grantella had feed upon several construction workers on the day before Ren was contacted by Nexus. During their first battle, Grantella was spirited away when Unknown Hand used the Dark Field cloud in the Meta Field. As revealed by Ishibori, Grantella was only examining the new Dunamist and that its true combat power is far greater than its debut, evidenced by hidden cannons on its torso. In its next battle, the Unknown Hand set up a Dark Field G to give Grantella additional advantage as during its initial defeat from Nexus' Cross Ray Schtrom, the Beast was instantly revived. After a reckless move in charging against Grantella, Nexus Junis Blue destroy it with Arrow Ray Schtrom. In an initial plan, Grantella was meant to be an aquatic Space Beast which operated in an undersea environment, while demonstrating additional motifs such as crayfish and barnacles.
- Arthropod-type Beast Banpira (アースロポッドタイプビースト バンピーラ, Āsuropoddo Taipu Bīsuto Banpīra; 29, 29DC): A gigantic white spider that utilized a copy of Memory Police's Memoraser, doing so to prey upon humans while remain hidden in a white fog with. It erased the memories of other bystanders to cover its trails. In a nearby forest, Banpira attempted to prey upon Riko Yamamura and Mizorogi before the Chrome Chesters thwarted it. (Note: In the director's cut exclusive scene, Banpira fought Nexus during its attempt to prey upon Mizorogi. The monster tied the Ultra with its web until he escaped with Core Final, as Banpira escaped after that.) The next day, Banpira try to advance towards the city as Nexus trapped the monster within Meta Field. In the end, it was killed by Nexus Junis Blue's Arrow Ray Schtrom.
- Reptile-type Beast Lizarias (レプタイルタイプビースト リザリアス, Reputairu Taipu Bīsuto Rizariasu; 30): A reptilian Space Beast with the ability to breathe fire. It was killed by Nexus Junis Blue's Schtrom Sword, but several of its pieces fell during their battle beforehand. As the White Sweepers were cleaning its remains, one particular piece of flesh was salvaged by the Unknown Hand. Likewise with Galberos and Nosferu, Lizarias is also made up from the cells of Beast the One.
  - Lizarias Grolar (リザリアスグローラー, Rizariasu Gurōrā; 31): After being upgraded by the Unknown Hand, Lizarias was revived into a different form, now sporting additional horns, eyes and mouth on its abdomen. Aside from unleashing purple stream of flames, it can also counter Ren's attack pattern. After Nagi's attempt in preventing the giant from marching in the firing path, Nexus Junis Blue destroy the monster with Arrow Ray Schtrom.
- Nautilus-type Beast Megaflash (ノーチラスタイプビースト メガフラシ, Nōchirasu Taipu Bīsuto Megafurashi; 33-35): Brought to Aoba New Town by Unknown Hand, Megaflash's purpose of constant rampage was to weaken the Visitors' Potential Barriers. By emitting Zero Gravity Rays (無重力光線, Mujūryoku Kōsen), it creates tentacles of light to grab onto humans and devour them. As a result of Ren's weakening condition, Nexus is incapable of erecting Meta-Field and was forced to bury the monster underground. After the Night Raiders' revolt against the TLT and rescuing Ren, Megaflash reappeared with a different Galberos to fight them before being defeated by the Hyper Strike Chester. Afterwards, Megaflash and Galberos was absorbed by Unknown to create Ezmael.
- Zero (ゼロ; Novel): The very first Space Beast to arrive in year 1989 in the American state of Colorado. It fed on livestock and caused various cattle mutilation incidents until it was killed by the military forces.
