= After... (video game) =

2003 video game

- Cover of the PS2 version of After...: Wasureemu Kizuna.
- Developer: Ciel
- Publishers: Ciel (PC); Pionesoft (DC, PS2)
- Designer: Tony Taka (character designs)
- Artist: Tony Taka
- Platforms: Windows 98, Dreamcast, PlayStation 2, Blu-ray, DVD
- Release: JP: June 27, 2003 (Win); JP: December 19, 2003 (Sweet Kiss); JP: February 26, 2004 (DC, PS2); JP: August 26, 2005 (Story Edition); JP: February 25, 2007 (DVD-PG); JP: May 21, 2010 (Blu-ray)
- Genres: Visual novel, eroge
- Mode: Single-player

After... is an adult Japanese visual novel developed by Ciel which was released on June 27, 2003, playable on the PC as a CD or a DVD.The early DVD version includes a guide book and soundtrack CD and the early CD version includes a guide book and a mouse pad. Subsequent enhanced ports to the Dreamcast and to the PlayStation 2 as After... ~Wasureemu Kizuna~ were released. Both ports feature their own exclusive characters and new scenarios not in the original PC release.

== Gameplay ==
The gameplay requires little interaction from the player as most of the duration of the game is spent on simply reading the text that will appear on the screen; this text represents either dialogue between the various characters, or the inner thoughts of the protagonist. Every so often, the player will come to a "decision point" where he or she is given the chance to choose from options that are displayed on the screen, typically two to three at a time. During these times, gameplay pauses until a choice is made that furthers the plot in a specific direction, depending on which choice the player makes.

== Characters ==
- Yūichi Takawashi (高鷲祐一, Takawashi Yūichi)
- Kanami Shiomiya (汐宮香奈美, Shiomiya Kanami)
- Nagisa Takawashi (高鷲渚, Takawashi Nagisa)
- Yōko Kishi (喜志陽子, Kishi Yōko)
- Kōtarō Takidani (滝谷紘太郎, Takidani Kōtarō)
- Keishō Abiko (我孫子慶生, Abiko Keishō)
- Miyuki Chihaya (千早美雪, Chihaya Miyuki)
- Saori Mikkaichi (三日市沙織, Mikkaichi Saori)
- Satoshi Kamuro (学文路聡, Kamuro Satoshi)
- Cypher (サイファ, Saifa)
- Lou (ルー, Rū)

== Release ==
After.. was first introduced in Japan on June 27, 2003, as a CD-ROM or a DVD-ROM playable on a Microsoft Windows PC. Two consumer console versions for the Dreamcast and PlayStation 2 with adult content removed were developed by Pionesoft and released on February 26, 2004, in limited and regular edition versions. Both versions had the title After... ~Wasureemu Kizuna~ (After...～忘れえぬ絆～, lit. "After... ~Unforgettable Bond~"). A version playable as a DVD TV game entitled After... DVDPG was released on February 25, 2007; and a version playable as a Blu-ray TV game was released on May 21, 2010. On August 26, 2005, a version containing both the original game and its fandisc called After... -Story Edition- was released.

After... Sweet Kiss, a fandisc for the original game released on December 19, 2003. It contains side stories for the three main heroines along with desk accessories.

== Anime ==
After... was adapted as a hentai OVA by Milky Label Animation. It was released on two DVDs between August 25, 2007, and January 25, 2008. Media Blasters licensed the two-episode OVA and released it in the United States thru Kitty Media on Blu-ray and DVD on September 28, 2021, with a new English dub featuring American voiceover actresses, Yara Naika and Diana Lockheart.
