= Tony Taka =

Japanese illustrator

- Born: 1971 (age 54–55); Miyagi Prefecture
- Occupations: Illustrator, Video game artist, Character designer

Tony Taka (田中 貴之, Tanaka Takayuki; born 1971 in Miyagi Prefecture), also referred to as just Tony (トニー, Tonī), is a Japanese manga artist, video game artist and character designer.

== Biography ==
Upon graduating from art design college, he first began working on advertisement designs, but in 1998 subsequently changed careers to become a manga/anime style artist. Soon after, he began illustrating for numerous eroge and designing their characters, thus quickly gaining himself renown and popularity. Apart from his illustration work, which has since encompassed designing general games such as the recent iterations of Sega's popular Shining roleplaying game series, he is also executive director of his own company, RPM Y.K.

== Works ==
=== General games ===
- Street Slam
- Ghostlop
- Tempest
- Room with Lina (ルーム・ウィズ・リナ, Rūmu wizu Rina)
- Shining Tears
- Shining Wind
- Shining Hearts
- Shining Blade
- Shining Ark
- Exstetra
- Shining Resonance
- Valhellio
- Azur Lane

=== Rated 18 Series ===
- Partner: Sekai de Ichiban Taisetsu na Hito (Partner ～世界でいちばんたいせつなひと～)
- Tsubasa no Hatameki: A Sound of her Wings (翼のはためき ～A Sound of her wings～)
- Arcana: Hikari to Yami no Extasis (アルカナ ～光と闇のエクスタシス～, Arukana ~Hikari to Yami no Ekusutashisu~)
- Mitama: Shinobi (御魂 ～忍～)
- After...
- Sora no Iro, Mizu no Iro (そらのいろ、みずのいろ)
- Shinshou Genmukan (真章 幻夢館, Shinshō: Genmukan)
- France Shoujo: Une fille blanche (仏蘭西少女～Une fille blanche～, Furansu Shōjo ~Une fille blanche~)
- Fault!! (フォルト！！, Foruto!!)
- Fault!! Service: Aratanaru Rival (フォルト!!S（サービス）～新たなる恋敵（ライバル）～, Foruto!! Sābisu ~Aratanaru Raibaru~)

=== Light novels ===
- Karakuri Onigami Akatsuki (機関鬼神アカツキ)

=== Dōjinshi ===
- Foundation X Kanzen-ban (FOUNDATION X 完全版) (Stellvia of the Universe)
- Unfinished (Princess Crown)
- Kaburimon/Kaburimon 2/Kaburimon 3 (カブリモン/カブリモン2/カブリモン3) (Ragnarok Online)
- Runar! (Mobile Suit Gundam Seed Destiny)
- Watashi wa Kyozetsu Suru! Kamo (わたしは拒絶するっ!かも) (Bleach)
- Maruyaki Barbeque (◯焼きバーベキュー) (Zoids: Genesis)
- Caladbolg (カラドボルグ, Karadoborugu) (Fate/stay night)
- Entangle (エンタングルENTANGLE, Entanguru) (Zegapain)
- Nekomimi Batoraa (ねこみみばとらあ) (Hayate no Gotoku)
- Kiteruyo! Takeuchi-kun (きてるよ!竹内くんっ) (Bamboo Blade)
- Hitagi Oneside (ひたぎ ONESIDE) (Bakemonogatari)
- Nanto Iu Deculture! (なんというデカルチャー!) (Macross Frontier)
- Botan Nabe (ぼたん鍋) (Clannad)

=== Artbooks ===
- Tony's Art Works Graph I to IV (Limited-edition release in Taiwan)
