= Shining Ark =

2013 video game

- Developer: Media.Vision
- Publisher: Sega
- Series: Shining
- Platform: PlayStation Portable
- Release: JP: February 28, 2013
- Genre: Role-playing
- Mode: Single-player

Shining Ark (シャイニング・アーク, Shainingu Akū) is a role-playing video game developed by Media.Vision and published by Sega for the PlayStation Portable. It is the fifth Shining game with characters designed by Tony Taka. It was released on February 28, 2013 in Japan.

== Gameplay ==
Shining Ark uses an "active and command battle system" for monster battles. Players move around the battlefield, guard, dash and attack enemies. Each character uses characteristic attacks. Up to four members can be brought into battle. In addition to battles, Shining Ark allows players to arrange vegetable gardens, gather dairy products such as eggs and milk and bake bread. Players can also hunt monsters to collect materials.

== Plot ==
A boy named Fried lives in Arcadia, a faraway island with ancient ruins. One day Fried sees a mysterious girl named Panis who has one black wing. Panis has an innocent personality and the miraculous power to gather animals by singing. Amazed, the islanders begin to call Panis an "angel".
