= Shining Wind =

2007 video game

- Developer: Nextech
- Publisher: Sega
- Designer: Tony Taka (character designs)
- Artist: Tony Taka
- Series: Shining
- Platform: PlayStation 2
- Release: JP: May 17, 2007
- Genre: Action role-playing game
- Modes: Single-player, multiplayer

Shining Wind (シャイニング・ウィンド, Shainingu Windo) is an action role-playing game developed by Nextech and published by Sega for the PlayStation 2, and the 19th game in the Shining video game series. It was released on May 17, 2007, in Japan. The game is the sequel to Shining Tears. The main characters from Shining Tears appear in Shining Wind as well. An anime adaptation of the two games, called Shining Tears X Wind, began airing in early April 2007. Like Shining Tears, the game is illustrated by artist Tony Taka.

== Characters ==
=== Real World ===
Touka Kureha (呉羽 冬華, Kureha Tōka)
- Voiced by: Yui Horie - Touka is a grade 12 student and also the student council secretary of her school. Representing beauty and wisdom, she is considered the "idol" of her school. She is a gentle and polite girl who always shows kindness to everyone, but when she meets something unreasonable she rejects it resolutely; in fact, she is terrible when she is angry. She is a miko and was born into a shrine family; she is good at the art of kyūdō and spells, but cooking is not her strong point. The school in which she studies was built by her grandfather, and her mother is the director general of this school.
Kanon Seena (椎名 夏音, Shiina Kanon)
- Voiced by: Nana Mizuki - A student who belongs to the Student Council.
Reia Hiruda (Hildareia) (蛭田 麗亜, Hiruda Reia)
- Voiced by: Kumi Sakuma - A seemingly innocent and quiet girl who is devoted to Saionji.

==== Soul Bladers ====
Souma Akizuki (秋月 蒼真, Akizuki Sōma)
- Voiced by: Sōichirō Hoshi - An athletic student who, along with Kureha, was transported to the dream continent, End Earth.
Kaito Kiriya (霧谷 魁斗, Kiriya Kaito)
- Voiced by: Akira Ishida - A quiet and shy student.
Haruto Saionji (西園寺 春人, Saionji Haruto)/Trihart (トライハルト, Toraiharuto)
- Voiced by: Ryōtarō Okiayu - An heir to a rich family and Student Council President.

=== End Earth ===
==== Liberia ====
===== Demonic Alchemy Empire Baelgard (Elven Kingdom Astraea) =====
Xecty Ein (ゼクティ・アイン, Zekuti Ain)
- Voiced by: Houko Kuwashima - One of Baelgard's four guardians.
Killrain (キルレイン, Kirurein)
- Voiced by: Hikaru Midorikawa - One of Baelgard's four guardians. Originally a normal and kind elf, until he was infected by the darkness.
Zeed (formerly Prince Leon Philias) (ジード, Jīdo)
- Voiced by: Takeshi Kusao - One of Baelgard's four guardians.

===== Holy Kingdom Philias =====
Clalaclan Philias (クララクラン・フィリアス, Kurarakuran Firiasu)
- Voiced by: Ayako Kawasumi - Princess and Priestess of Philias' Tower of the Sun.
Caris Philias (カリス・フィリアス, Karisu Firiasu)
- Voiced by: Ryōko Shiraishi - Prince of Philias, thus the future king, and Clalaclan's younger brother.
Jin-Crow (ジンクロウ, Jinkurō)
- Voiced by: Hisao Egawa - A mysterious birdman.
Raidel (ライデル, Raideru)
- Voiced by: Hirohiko Kakegawa - Priest of Philias.

===== United Trading Nation Seiran =====
Rouen (ロウエン, Rōen)
- Voiced by: Tetsu Inada - The King of Seiran. Before becoming king, he was the captain of a pirate crew, but his great conviction and good heart made him win the trust of the beastmen.
Houmei (ホウメイ, Hōmei)
- Voiced by: Chiwa Saitō - The Priestess of Seiran's Tower of Rain Water.
Shumari (シュマリ, Shumari)
- Voiced by: Hiroshi Kamiya - Chancellor of Seiran.
Basou (バソウ, Basō)
- Voiced by: Takahiko Sakaguma - One of Seiran's five generals. A quiet centaurian warrior. He acts as King Rouen's scout.
Enu (エンウ, En'u)
- Voiced by: Kazunari Tanaka - One of Seiran's five generals. A bird-like warrior.
Hyoun (ヒョウウン, Hyōun)
- Voiced by: Kazuya Nakai - One of Seiran's five generals. He was ordered to watch over Houmei.
Kouryu (コウリュウ, Kōryū)
- Voiced by: Tomohisa Asō - One of Seiran's five generals. A bow-wielding turtle-like warrior. When sober, he is very understanding, however, when he is drunk, he fights others for no apparent reason.
Raihi (ライヒ, Raihi)
- Voiced by: Naoki Imamura - One of Seiran's five generals. A tiger-like warrior, who is a good friend of Hyouun. He is very proud of his skills as a warrior.

==== Valeria ====
===== Mercenary Knighthood Weissritter =====
Zero
- Voiced by: Sōichirō Hoshi - Zero is Xion, or what is left of his soul. His angelic wings represent the two entities inside his body; the black one represents Zeroboros, while the white one represents what is left of Xion, but for all intents and purposes, Xion no longer exists.
Mao (マオ, Mao)
- Voiced by: Ai Nonaka - A quarter-beast who has a pair of cat-like ears. She is also the Princess of Bestia.
Elwing (エルウィン, Eruwin)
- Voiced by: Ryō Hirohashi - An old friend of Zero from the Elf race, and is also the princess of Fontina.
Blanc Neige (ブラン·ネージュ, Buran Nēju)
- Voiced by: Ayako Kawasumi - An old friend of Zero and an Ice Sorceress, who lives in an ice house and showers with ice. She is also the princess of Runevale. She is considered a beauty, but is often cold toward others.
Ryuna (リュウナ, Ryūna)
- Voiced by: Akemi Kanda - A priestess of Etwarl Shrine.
Lazarus (ラザラス, Razarasu)
- Voiced by: Yoshinori Sonobe - A Dragonian tribesman who is also a close friend to Ryuna, who acknowledged Zero's intentions.

==== Others ====
Composer of the Eternal Forest (久遠の森の詠み手, Kuon no Mori no Yomite)/Celestia (セレスティア, Seresutia)
- Voiced by: Ryō Hirohashi
Lassi (ラッシィ, Rasshī)
- Voiced by: Junko Hagimori

== Music ==
- "Heart-shaped chant"
  Lyrics by: Nana Mizuki
  Composition and arrangement by: Noriyasu Agematsu (Elements Garden)
  Song by: Nana Mizuki (published in the single "SECRET AMBITION")

== Reception ==
The game was released on Japan on May 17, 2007, and sold over 78,000 units in four days, becoming the top selling game in the country in that week.

According to the 2006 hands-on preview from IGN, the game runs at constant 60 frames per second.

== Other media ==
A game OST was released on May 31, 2007. It features the theme song, "Heart-Shaped Chant", by Nana Mizuki.
