= Shining Tears =

2004 video game

- Developer: Nextech / Amusement Vision
- Publisher: Sega
- Director: Daisuke Tajima
- Producers: Katsuji Aoyama; Yoshitaka Maki
- Designer: Fumio Shimoyama
- Artist: Tony Taka
- Series: Shining
- Platform: PlayStation 2
- Release: JP: November 3, 2004; NA: March 22, 2005
- Genre: Action RPG
- Modes: Single-player, multiplayer

Shining Tears (シャイニング・ティアーズ, Shainingu Tiāzu) is an action role-playing game co-developed by Nextech and Amusement Vision and published by Sega in 2004 for the PlayStation 2 as a part of the Shining video game series. It tells the story of a mysterious boy named Xion.

An anime adaptation for the game was announced by Sega, entitled Shining Tears X Wind. It was produced by Studio Deen and began airing in early April 2007. A sequel, Shining Wind, was released in 2007, with return appearances by all the main characters of Shining Tears.

== Gameplay ==
Shining Tears is an action role-playing game. In each stage, the player advances by killing all the enemies before advancing to the next area. The enemy side wins if they kill the player character, Xion, or if the player chooses to escape. As with other Shining games, players can grind for levels and items by repeatedly escaping from a mission and restarting it, killing enemies and collecting items each time.

Xion is supported by a partner character. The partner character is largely AI-controlled, but at any time the player can take control of the partner character's movement using the second analog stick, lock them into place, or execute certain simple commands such as link skills. Shining Tears also allows a second player to control the partner character for cooperative multiplayer, but only when replaying previously completed stages.

As traditional for role-playing video games, experience points are awarded after an enemy is defeated, ultimately increasing the character's abilities with a level up. With each level up a character gains Status Points and Skill Points. Status Points increase a character's attributes. Skill Points can unlock new skills or level up previously obtained skills. Rather than obtaining new weapons, each character's starting weapon is modified and improved using materials that are awarded at the end of missions, found in chests, hidden around maps, and randomly dropped from monsters.

Monster cards are randomly dropped from defeated monsters. These cards, if brought to Pios in the Heroes' Hearth, can be catalogued and viewed. The monster cards provide statistical information on the monsters portrayed.

The game features multiple endings that are dependent on which female character is used as the partner character the most.

== Plot ==
In the beginning of the story, an elven girl named Elwyn finds Xion washed up on the shore of a river. She checks if he is still alive and as she looks, a ring falls by the water. As Elwyn tries to take it, she sees that Xion is on the verge of death so she takes him quickly to the village doctor, Pios. When Xion wakes up, he finds himself in The Heroes' Hearth, the tavern of the town Heroes' Way.

He is then confronted by Pios and Elwyn, questioning him on what happened. He says he cannot remember and only vaguely remembers his name. The two introduce themselves to him and he finds both his hands have two strange rings. They will not come off his hands as Pios tries to investigate the rings. The two then explain that the rings could possibly be the Twin Dragon Rings, the legendary rings of power. Discarding the thought, Pios investigates more on the rings as Xion falls asleep.

A feature of this game is that there is a unique ending involving each of the eight characters that Xion can team up with, making up a total of eight endings. The ending is determined by the character that Xion has developed the highest relationship with.

== Characters ==
The game's characters were designed by the Japanese artist Tony Taka.

- Xion: He is an amnesiac boy who carries the Twin Dragon Rings, which he received from his Mother, Zenovia, to use for his training. Xion was washed up on a shore near the inn Heroes Hearth. He is found by the elven girl Elwyn and introduced to Doctor Pios, who nurses him back to health. Xion becomes involved in a series of battles to defend the nation Shildia from aggressors. Xion has three personalities within him: A somewhat insecure, good hearted young boy (when no one is wearing the other Twin Dragon Ring), a serene, noble hero (when the other bearer of a Ring has a dark soul), and a battle-crazy, insult-flinging fighter (when the other bearer of a Ring has a light soul) though he retains his kind traits even in this form.
- Lazarus: He is the Dragonian guardian of the priestess Ryuna. As is the rule for Dragonians, Lazarus was raised from the day he hatched to protect the current priestess of the Etwarl Temple, the house of worship for the Dragon God, at all costs. Lazarus's enormous strength and defense are his most noteworthy traits, as well as his protective nature that extends to all his allies. Lazarus is also slightly jealous of Xion. At one point in the game, Lazarus sacrifices his life to protect the party from a devastating magic attack. If the player has developed enough of a friendship with Ryuna, Xion will journey with her to the Tower of Heaven to revive him, though Lazarus will return from the dead at the same point in any case. Upon his revival, Lazarus's soul changes from Light to Dark and this alters the qualities of some of his moves.
- Neige: Often referred to as the Ice Witch due to her specialization in ice magic, Neige was first identified as a member of Volg's Weissritter group. It is later revealed that she is crown princess of Runevale Kingdom (one of the opposing forces). She was targeted for a murder by her younger brother Galahad, but was rescued by Cupido and taken to Shildia where she joined Weissritter. She is cold, sarcastic and antisocial, but intelligent. She first doubts Xion's potential, but changes her mind once she is fought alongside him. As time passes, her cold personality fades and she is revealed to be a nice and honorable girl. In the war against Runegeist (the new name of Runevale), Galahad is killed, much to her dismay.

== Music ==
Opening Theme

- "Shining Tears"
  Lyrics by: Natsuko Kondo
  Composition and arrangement by: Gou Takahashi
  Performed by: Souichiro Hoshi

Ending Theme

- "The Light's Silhouette" (光のシルエット, Hikari no Shiruetto)
  Lyrics by: Yurie Kokubu
  Composition and arrangement by: Masaki Iwamoto
  Performed by: Souichiro Hoshi

These theme songs were also used in the anime version, Shining Tears X Wind.

== Reception ==
Reception

Aggregate score
Aggregator	Score
Metacritic	61/100

Review scores
Publication	Score
Electronic Gaming Monthly	6.17/10
Famitsu	31/40
Game Informer	7.75/10
GameSpot	6.4/10
GameSpy	3/5
GameZone	6/10
IGN	6.1/10
Official U.S. PlayStation Magazine	3/5
PlayStation: The Official Magazine	6/10
X-Play	1/5

The game received "mixed" reviews according to the review aggregation website Metacritic. In Japan, Famitsu gave it a score of one eight, one seven, and two eights for a total of 31 out of 40.
