= Ryan Drummond =

American actor (born 1973)

- Drummond in 2026
- Born: Ryan Shawn Drummond; January 10, 1973 (age 53); Lima, Ohio, U.S.
- Other name: Shawn Silver
- Education: Eastern Michigan University (BA)
- Occupations: Actor; comedian; singer
- Years active: 1980–present
- Spouse(s): Lisa Drummond (m. 2002; div. 2019) Abby Drummond (m. 2019)
- Children: 2
- Musical career
- Genres: Musical theatre; jazz; opera
- Instruments: Vocals
- Member of: The A.Y.U. Quartet

Comedy career
- Medium: Film; television; theatre
- Genres: Sketch comedy; improvisational comedy; physical comedy; clowning; mime
- Website: www.ryandrummond.com (archive)

Ryan Shawn Drummond (born January 10, 1973) is an American actor, comedian and singer, best known for his role as the original English voice of Sonic the Hedgehog in the Sonic the Hedgehog video game franchise from 1998 to 2004.

== Early life ==
Ryan Shawn Drummond was born in Lima, Ohio, on January 10, 1973. He attended Clague Middle School in Ann Arbor, Michigan, where he participated in various children's theatre, beginning in 1980 at seven years old. Both of his parents also worked in theatre, his mother and father was both actors and theatre directors of the children theatre plays that Ryan participated in while in school.

In 1993, he got his first paid acting job at a dinner theater while still attending college. He graduated from the Eastern Michigan University in 1995, with a degree in theater. Upon graduating, he moved to San Diego, California in 1996 to pursue his acting career.

== Career ==
In 1997, Drummond got his first television acting role as DJ Johnny Jam in an episode of the television drama series Baywatch. He would later star in several other television shows, such as Two Guys, a Girl and a Pizza Place, The Chronicle, The Invisible Man, Point Pleasant and Trauma. He also made a guest appearance in an episode on The Rosie O'Donnell Show in December 1998, during the Toys For Tots segment. In film, he made his feature film debut in the 2000 teen cheerleading comedy film, Bring It On, as Theatre Boy.

As a voice actor, he has provided many character voices in various video games titles. In 1998, he became the voice of Sonic the Hedgehog in the video games series for Sega. When auditioning for the role, he was asked by the voice director, "You see that picture of Sonic the Hedgehog on the wall there? If you could imagine a voice coming out of him, what would it sound like?" Drummond stated that he had no time to think and decided to give him a "speedy teenage hedgehog voice", and that Sonic's personality was summarized in four words as "cool, blue, rebellious teenager". A week later, the casting director called him up and said he got the part.

He continued to voice the character for six more years until 2004, in the video games Sonic Adventure, Sonic Adventure 2, Sonic Heroes, Sonic Shuffle, Sonic Battle, Sonic Advance 3 and Sega Superstars, as well as in commercials for Sega Dreamcast and McDonald's, and in a episode of the talk show The Rosie O'Donnell Show. He also voiced Knuckles the Echidna in Sonic Shuffle, Metal Sonic in Sonic Heroes, and briefly voiced Shadow the Hedgehog for a few lines in Sonic Adventure 2.

Additionally, he also voiced Elliot Ballade in Blue Stinger, Insider in AirBlade, Bill Bardi in The Godfather II, J. Edgar Hoover and various other characters in Call of Cthulhu: Dark Corners of the Earth, Kevin Kertsman in Illbleed and has recently voiced the Doctor character in Mafia: Definitive Edition, where he also did the motion-capture.

Drummond initially wanted to play Sonic in the anime adaptation Sonic X, and even offered to move to New York so he could play the role, 4Kids instead hired Jason Griffith who later became his successor.

In an interview, Drummond stated that he was offered the chance by Sega to re-audition as Sonic during the development of Sonic Generations, but he rejected the role because Sega refused to give him a union contract.

He also did acting and voice work in commercials, such as The Padres, Wheel Of Fortune, Ocean's Eleven, Checkmate Inc., Clear Factor Skincare, Hoist Fitness Systems, and Diedrich Coffee. Additionally, he has done voices for theme parks including SeaWorld Orlando as Shamu for a few years and has also provided various background voices in Legoland California.

Outside of acting, Drummond has also worked in comedy, such as a mime artist and a clown.

Today, Drummond mainly works in theatre. He starred in a musical comedy theatre show in San Diego titled Forever Plaid. He would later star in many other musical theatre productions, such as Godspell, Into the Woods, City of Angels, Zhivago, The Producers, Hairspray, The Wedding Singer, Anything Goes, Singin' in the Rain, Mary Poppins, Sunday in the Park with George, Men Are From Mars, Women Are From Venus and most recently, Groundhog Day.

In 2020, Drummond would once again reprise his role as the voice of Sonic in the radio fan web-series Sonic and Tails R.

In 2025, Drummond and his second wife Abby founded the talent agency The Gold Ring Agency, as a way for events to book appearances of Drummond and other Sonic Adventure series voice actors like David Humphrey and Scott Dreier.

== Music career ==
Drummond is a member and the bass vocalist in the music group, The A.Y.U. Quartet. Together, the music group has released three albums.

== Personal life ==
Upon moving to San Diego, California, Drummond met his first wife Lisa. They were married on October 8, 2002, and together, they have two sons. In 2019, they had divorced, and on October 30, 2019, Drummond married his second wife Abby. He currently resides in San Francisco, California.

Drummond would update his fans about his personal life from time to time on his online blog.

== Filmography ==
=== Film ===
Year	Title	Role	Notes	Ref.
2000	Bring It On	Theatre Boy		
2001	Poor Man	Mime	Short film	
2002	Trial By Pies	—N/a		
2003	Miniature Sun	—N/a		
2004	The Color Of Corruption	—N/a		
2005	Man of the House	—N/a		
2008	Based on a True Story	Hunter		

=== Television ===
Year	Title	Role	Notes	Ref.
1997	Baywatch	DJ Johnny Jam	Episode: "Baywatch at Sea World"	
1998	Two Guys, a Girl and a Pizza Place	Isaac Glickstein	Episode: "Two Guys, a Girl and an Elective"	
1999	The Rosie O'Donnell Show	Sonic the Hedgehog	Voice; Season 4, Episode 69	
2001	The Chronicle	Andy	Episode: "What Gobbles Beneath"	
2001	The Invisible Man	Mime, Scientologist	Episodes: "Money for Nothing: Part 2", "Immaterial Girl"	
2002	Art of Betrayal	—N/a	1 episode	
2004	Veronica Mars	Roger	Episode: "You Think You Know Somebody"	
2005	Point Pleasant	Booth Vendor	Episode: "Hell Hath No Fury Like a Woman Choked"	
2009	Trauma	Fair Patron	Episode: "All's Fair"	
2011	Dual Suspects	Robert Evans	Episode: "Fast Food Fatality"	

=== Video games ===
Year	Title	Role	Notes	Ref.
1997	The Three Decoders: Riddle of the Ring	Sheldon		
1997	The Three Decoders 2: Key to the Carousel	Sheldon		
1998	Sonic Adventure	Sonic the Hedgehog		
1999	Nancy Drew: Stay Tuned for Danger	Rick Arlen		
1999	Blue Stinger	Eliot Ballade		
1999	Twisted Metal 4	Pizza Boy		
2000	Evil Dead: Hail to the King	Merchant		
2000	Danger Girl	Additional voices		
2000	The Mummy	Jonathan Carnahan		
2000	Sonic Shuffle	Sonic the Hedgehog, Knuckles the Echidna	Credited as Shawn Silver for Knuckles the Echidna	
2001	Undying	Various		
2001	Illbleed	Kevin Kertsman		
2001	Zax: The Alien Hunter	Zax, Korbo, Villager		
2001	Sonic Adventure 2	Sonic the Hedgehog, Shadow the Hedgehog (few lines)		
2002	AirBlade	Insider		
2002	NASCAR Racing 2002 Season	Spotter		
2002	Backyard Baseball 2003	Albert Pujols, Alex Rodriguez, Cliff Floyd, Frank Thomas, Achmed Khan, Ernie Steele, Pablo Sanchez, Tony Delvecchio		
2002	Backyard Football	Achmed Khan, Amir Khan, Ernie Steele, Pablo Sanchez, Tony Delvecchio		
2003	Chrome	Additional voices		
2003	Rogue Ops	Additional voices		
2003	Backyard Soccer 2004	Additional voices		
2003	Sonic Battle	Sonic the Hedgehog		
2003	Sonic Heroes	Sonic the Hedgehog, Metal Sonic		
2004	Duel Masters	Additional voices		
2004	Gangland	Black Boss, Bouncer, Croupier, Civilian, Sniper, Cop, Ninja, Additional voices		
2004	Spy Fiction	Michael Kwan		
2004	Sonic Advance 3	Sonic the Hedgehog		
2004	Sega Superstars	Sonic the Hedgehog		
2005	Call of Cthulhu: Dark Corners of the Earth	J. Edgar Hoover, Seaman Willie Thompson, Experiment, Poorhouse Resident, Cutter Urania Seaman, Yithian, Additional voices		
2005	Cold War	Carter, scientist, Civilian		
2006	Scared Rings	Additional voices		
2008	The Godfather II: Crime Rings	Bill Bardi		
2009	The Godfather II	Bill Bardi, Additional voices		
2009	Guitar Hero: Van Halen	Additional voices		
2020	Mafia: Definitive Edition	Doctor	Also motion-capture	

=== Web ===
Year	Title	Role	Notes	Ref.
2020–2021, 2024	Sonic and Tails R	Sonic the Hedgehog	11 episodes YouTube fan-made audio drama series	

=== Theme parks ===
Year	Title	Role	Notes	Ref.
1997	SeaWorld San Diego	Shamu, Wild Arctic monitor		
1999	Legoland California	Various voices		

=== Commercials ===
Title	Role	Notes	Ref.
The Padres	Baseball fan	Channel 4	
McDonald's	Sonic the Hedgehog	Voice	
Wheel of Fortune	—N/a	King World distribution	
Sega Dreamcast	Sonic the Hedgehog	Voice	
Oceans Eleven Casino	Himself		
Checkmate Inc.	—N/a		

=== Ads ===
Title	Ref.
Mastercard	
Pizza Hut	
Weekenders Clothing Company	
Chrysler	
Jack in the Box	
Washington Mutual Bank	
Carl's Jr.	
Petco	
Deputy Inc.	
Sunrider	
Applied Micro Circuits	
Lifeforce	
Ford Motor Company	
CTX International	
Mamillian Express	

== Theatre ==
Year	Title	Role	Notes	Ref.
1996	Festival Of Christmas: Once Upon A Time...	Thorr	Lamb's Players Theatre	
1996	I Love You, You're Perfect, Now Change	Man #1	Off-Broadway	
1998	Show Boat	Windy, Jim, Backwoodsman	Off-Broadway	
2001	Kiss Me, Kate	Bill Calhoun, Lucentio	West End	
2001	Marooned! with Clyde and Seamore	Juan Ho	SeaWorld San Diego	
2001	Pinocchio	Pinocchio	Off-Broadway	
2000–2005	Forever Plaid	Smudge	Lamb's Players Theatre, Latina Playhouse Moulton Theatre	
2002	Godspell	John the Baptist	Lamb's Players Theatre	
2003	Cotton Patch Gospel	Simon Rock Johnson	Lamb's Players Theatre	
2003	Festival of Christmas: It's Christmas And It's Live!	Ronald Harmon	Lamb's Players Theatre	
2003	Shear Madness	Eddie Lawrence	Off-Broadway	
2003	Joseph and the Amazing Technicolor Dreamcoat	Judah, Levi	Off-Broadway	
2005	Palm Beach	Ensemble	La Jolla Playhouse Mandela Weiss Theatre	
2006	Zhivago	Performer	La Jolla Playhouse Mandela Weiss	
2006	Dr. Seuss' How the Grinch Stole Christmas! The Musical	Young Max	Old Globe Theatre	
2006	Into the Woods	Baker	Lamb's Players Theatre	
2008	Caroline, or Change	Stuart Gellman	Mountain View Center for the Performing Arts	
2008	Annie Get Your Gun	Frank Butler	John Muir Amphitheater	
2009	The Producers	Leo Bloom	Lesher Center for the Arts Hofmann Theatre	
2009	The Wedding Singer	Robbie Hart	Willows Theatre Company Concord	
2009	On the Town	Ozzie	Lesher Center for the Arts Hofmann Theatre	
2010	A Grand Night for Singing	Lesher Center for the Arts	Cosmopolitan Cabaret	
2010	Hairspray	Corny Collins	Woodminster Amphitheater	
2010	She Loves Me	Georg Nowack	Lesher Center for the Arts	
2011	Curtains	Lieutenant Frank Cioffi	Foothill Collage Lehman Theatre	
2011	The Fantasticks	El Gallo	Willows Theatre Company Concord	
2011	A Midsummer Night’s Dream	Puck	Off-Broadway	
2012	Anything Goes	Moonface Martin	Foothill Collage Lehman Theatre	
2012	Assassins	Samuel Byck	The Ashby Stage	
2012	Pal Joey	Ludlow Lowell	The Eureka Theatre	
2013	Singin' in the Rain	Cosmo Brown	Lester Center for the Arts	
2013	Carnival	Paul Berthalet	The Eureka Theatre	
2013	1776	Richard Henry Lee	American Conservatory Theater	
2013–2014	Edward Gant's Amazing Feats of Loneliness!	Dearlove	The Ashby Stage	
2014	Painting the Clouds With Sunshine	Russell James	The Eureka Theatre	
2014	Du Barry Was a Lady	Jones, Le Docteur, Paingrille	The Eureka Theatre	
2014	Life Could Be a Dream	Denny	Lester Center for the Arts	
2015	Nick & Nora	Nick Charles	The Eureka Theatre	
2015	Company	David	San Francisco Playhouse	
2015, 2016	Scrooge in Love	Jacob Marley	The Eureka Theatre	
2016	City of Angels	Buddy Fidler, Irwin S. Irving	San Francisco Playhouse	
2017	La Cage aux Folles	Georges	San Francisco Playhouse	
2017–2018	A Christmas Story	The Old Man	San Francisco Playhouse	
2017–2020	Men Are From Mars, Women Are From Venus	Performer		
2018	Sunday in the Park with George	Jules, Bob Greenberg	San Francisco Playhouse	
2018–2019	Mary Poppins	Mr. George Banks	San Francisco Playhouse	
2019–2020	Groundhog Day	Phil Connors	San Francisco Playhouse	

== Discography ==
- S.C.R.A.M. (1994) – Harmony, lead vocals
- Atomic Young Ultrasonics (1996) – Harmony, lead vocals
- Acappella Yuletide Uproar (2010) – Harmony, lead vocals
