= LBX =

LBX may refer to:

- Low Bandwidth X, computing protocol
- Little Battlers Experience, video game series
  - LBX: Little Battlers eXperience, the third game in that series
- Lexus LBX, type of car
