= Blue Stinger =

1999 video game

- North American cover art
- Developer: Climax Graphics
- Publishers: JP: Sega; WW: Activision
- Director: Ayumu Kojima
- Producer: Shinya Nishigaki
- Designer: Atsushi Yamamoto
- Programmer: Kazuaki Yokozawa
- Artists: Ryosuke Murakami; Masaki Segawa; Robert Short
- Writers: Masaki Segawa; Shinya Nishigaki
- Composer: Toshihiko Sahashi
- Platform: Dreamcast
- Release: JP: March 25, 1999; NA: September 9, 1999; EU: October 14, 1999
- Genre: Action-adventure
- Mode: Single-player

Blue Stinger (Note: Japanese: ブルー スティンガー, Hepburn: Burū Sutingā) is a 1999 action-adventure game developed by Climax Graphics for the Dreamcast. It was published by Sega in Japan, and by Activision in Western territories as a console launch title. The story follows emergency rescuer Eliot Ballade after he is stranded on the monster-infested Dinosaur Island and allies with fellow survivors and the alien being Nephilim to find the source of the monsters. Gameplay has Eliot navigating Dinosaur Island, fighting monsters using various weapons found or purchased during the game, and finding items to progress to other areas.

Producer and co-writer Shinya Nishigaki was inspired to make Blue Stinger as a tribute to Western action movies. Preproduction began in 1996 with a team of eighteen. Notable American staff included Robert Short as monster designer and Pete von Sholly as storyboard artist and camera consultant. The music was composed by Toshihiko Sahashi. The game received mixed reviews from journalists; it was praised for its gameplay and presentation, but several outlets criticized its camera and voice acting. While it sold poorly in Japan, it was successful in North America, going on to sell 500,000 copies worldwide.

== Gameplay ==
An enemy encounter in Blue Stinger

Blue Stinger is an action-adventure game in which players take control of Eliot Ballade or Dogs Bower on Dinosaur Island after it is overrun by monsters. Players explore the game's 3D environments to progress the story by unlocking new parts of the island complex. The Japanese version uses fixed third-person camera perspectives similar to the early Resident Evil series, while the Western version uses a third-person camera fixed behind the player character and includes an optional first-person mode. In addition to the main mission, there are optional side missions which grant new weapons or items. If the current character loses all health, the player reaches a game over and is sent back to the title screen to reload an earlier save.

Gameplay revolves around Eliot or Dogs−whom the player can switch between once they are together−exploring different areas of the Dinosaur Island complex and finding key items to progress, such as key cards for unlocking doors. The game is made up of eight large environments, which range from outdoor areas such as harbors, to indoor locations such as laboratories and a shopping mall. Some environments include passive hostile elements such as extreme temperatures, with their effects shown using a status bar. Enemies are encountered while exploring and can be fought using weapons, which are either found in the environment or bought from vending machines using money dropped from enemies. Larger enemies and bosses have dedicated health bars. Each character has different strengths and weaknesses; Eliot moves faster, can use multiple weapons, and can swim underwater for a limited time, while Dogs moves slower and can only use one weapon, but can defend himself and uses his fists to fight enemies.

== Synopsis ==
Sixty-five million years ago, a meteorite crashes into Earth, wiping out the dinosaurs and paving the way for humans. In 2000, an earthquake sinks the Yucatán Peninsula aside from one island over the meteorite impact area. This island is dubbed "Dinosaur Island", and international biotech corporation Kimra establishes a research community on it. In 2018, Emergency Sea Evacuation and Rescue member Eliot Ballade is on vacation with his friend Tim off Dinosaur Island when a small meteorite crashes near it, generating a barrier that traps Tim in stasis. A light source emerges from the meteorite and takes the shape and name of Tim's good luck boat charm Nephilim, connecting with Eliot before monsters appear and attack the boat, seemingly killing Tim. Eliot escapes with Nephilim to Dinosaur Island, which has become overwhelmed by monsters born from mutated animals and humans. While exploring the island, Eliot is guided by Nephilim, receives information via radio from security team survivor Janine King; and teams up with Dogs Bower, the original discoverer of the island and Janine's estranged father.

During their exploration, Eliot learns Kimra had discovered the meteorite was the egg of a hostile alien codenamed "Dinosite", whose DNA can mutate other lifeforms. During one attack, Eliot swallows some of a mutant's vomit and starts to mutate, with Dogs being prepared to mercy kill him if the change is irreversible. Eliot is narrowly cured when the group finds a serum designed to reverse the mutation. Nephilim, who communicates telepathically with Eliot and Janine, is revealed to be the spirit of the second meteorite and an alien which opposes the Dinosite. The three humans allow Nephilim to reunite with her original body, allowing her to kill the original Dinosite while Eliot and Dogs destroy a cloned version which Kimra created during their experiments. Nephilim bids farewell to Eliot, while Tim is revealed to be alive. A post-credits scene shows Nephilim transforming into a Dinosite meteor and launching from a shell which is pursued by more Nephilim meteors.

== Development ==
The concept for Blue Stinger was created by Shinya Nishigaki, a developer who had worked at Enix and later Climax Entertainment. When creating the concept, Nishigaki was inspired by the movies of Steven Spielberg, Akira Kurosawa, John Carpenter and Joe Dante. A specific inspiration was Carpenter's movie The Thing. He considered Blue Stinger a tribute to Western action movies. To develop the game, Nishigaki and several staff from Climax Entertainment's CGI division who had worked on Dark Savior (1996) formed Climax Graphics as an independent "brother company". Pre-production of Blue Stinger began in September 1996 following completion of Dark Savior. Originally in development for the Sega Saturn, Blue Stinger was rebooted as a Dreamcast title at Sega's request. The reworked game's design and atmosphere drew additional inspiration from Resident Evil, Enemy Zero, and Alone in the Dark. Full production started following the prototype's approval by Sega in December 1997. Debugging lasted from late January to early March 1999.

The staff was split between eighteen people at Climax Graphics in Japan, and ten working from North America on the early design and localization. Nishigaki produced the game and co-wrote the script. Other staff included Ayumu Kojima as director, Kazuaki Yokozawa as lead programmer, Ryosuke Murakami as art director, and Masaki Segawa as character designer and co-writer. The game designer was Atsushi Yamamoto. Through American connections from his university years, Nishigaki brought on Robert Short to create the creature designs and 3D models, and noted storyboard artist Pete von Sholly to be camera supervisor. Sholly also handled the game's storyboards. The Japanese team worked almost 24 hours a day to complete the game, only taking a few days off during its two years in development.

The game was classified as a cinematic action-adventure game, though Nishigaki wanted to be classed outside traditional game genres. He described one of the game's themes as "wit" or "humor", wanting to set the game apart from the horror-focused titles dominating the Japanese 3D adventure market. The environments were designed to have as few repeated elements as possible, additionally designing the environment to appear lived-in and realistic. The original camera design was directly inspired by his love of movies. Character movements were animated using motion capture. The game engine could not handle two player characters on-screen, though early plans had Dogs tagging along as an AI-driven companion and providing comic relief through environmental interactions. The team also did not have time to make Janine playable.

Nishigaki described the plot as Segawa's work, with Nishigaki mostly writing the character banter. Eliot was not written as a conventional lead, being fun-loving and flirtatious in contrast to Dogs' more traditional stoic attitude. Janine was described as central to the character drama. Commenting on the character and world design, Segawa described Nephilim as a fantastical being compared to the grounded tone of the other characters. The game featured both fully 3D graphics for its environments and character models, and a large number of CGI cutscenes. Nishigaki speculated that Sega's support of the project was due to this 3D focus. The lighting was split between three sources; Nephilim, weapon bursts, and pre-set lightmaps. While the Dreamcast was reported to refresh at 60 frames per second, Blue Stinger was kept to 30 due to the number of creatures shown on screen. They also did not use some of the graphical elements the console was capable of such as bump mapping. During development the team did not know the full specifications of the Dreamcast, with Nishigaki saying they used half the console's graphical capacity.

The music was composed by Toshihiko Sahashi, whom Nishigaki wanted to create a Hollywood-style score for the game. The opening and ending themes were recorded using a 60-piece orchestra conducted by Kouji Haishima. Nishigaki wanted the score to emulate the music of John Williams. Blue Stinger was Sahashi's first video game job, treating it like a background movie score. In contrast to his earlier movie and television work, Sahashi had as much time as he wanted to create the score. The opening and ending themes were composed to match the finished movie scenes. Only the opening and ending themes used CD-quality music, with the rest of the game music using the Dreamcast's sound chip. Voice acting for all regions was in English, with the Japanese release using subtitles to emulate Hollywood movies. The two leads were voiced by Ryan Drummond and Deem Bristow. The voice recording was directed by Lani Minella, who also voiced Janine. All three at the time were voicing characters from the Sonic the Hedgehog series. Nishigaki felt Drummond had done a good job voicing Eliot.

== Release ==
Blue Stinger was announced at the Tokyo Game Show in September 1998 as part of Sega's launch lineup for the Dreamcast in November of that year. It was ultimately delayed into the following year to further polish the title. Nishigaki described Sega as disappointed but understanding that the game missed the Japanese console launch. The game was published in Japan on March 25, 1999, by Sega. Two CDs were released on March 20 of that year through Columbia's music label; a soundtrack album, and a single featuring a promotional image song "Sting Me". A strategy guide, containing both in-game guides and a developer interview, was published by SoftBank Creative on April 27.

The game was shown off at E3 1999, confirming that Activision would serve as the game's publisher outside Japan. The partnership came about when Sega approached Activision about Dreamcast support, and Activision expressed interest in Blue Stinger. For its Western release, the camera was changed at Activision's insistence. Nishigaki disliked the new camera, derisively calling it the "gero system". A harder difficulty was included for players who cleared the game on hard difficulty, resulting in character costumes changing. Some elements that might either not be understood outside Japan or might have proven offensive were also adjusted for the Western release.

The game was released in North America on September 9, 1999, and in Europe on October 14. It was a console launch title in both regions. An English strategy guide was published by BradyGames on September 14, 1999. A sequel was proposed by Sega, but Nishigaki had moved onto working on the survival horror game Illbleed. Plans to port expanded versions of Blue Stinger and Illbleed to the Xbox by Coolnet Entertainment were shelved following Nishigaki's death in 2004; a given reason was the Xbox's poor commercial performance in Japan.

== Reception ==
Reception

Aggregate score
| Aggregator | Score |
|---|---|
| GameRankings | 70% |

Review scores
| Publication | Score |
|---|---|
| CNET Gamecenter | 7/10 |
| Edge | 5/10 |
| Electronic Gaming Monthly | 4.5/10, 4/10, 4/10, 4.5/10 |
| Famitsu | 28/40 |
| Game Informer | 4.75/10, 5.75/10, 5.25/10 |
| GameFan | 70% |
| GamePro | 4/5 |
| GameSpot | 6.3/10 |
| GameSpy | 5.5/10 |
| IGN | 8.4/10 |
| Next Generation | 3/5 |

Blue Stinger sold over 61,000 copies during its opening week in Japan with a sell-through rate of just under 56%. It went on to sell over 111,000 copies in total and become the console's 34th best-selling title in the region. While the game sold relatively poorly in Japan, it was commercially successful in North America. During the Dreamcast's debut week in the UK, Blue Stinger was the eighth best-selling title out of the twelve launch titles. In Brazil, Blue Stinger was the third-best-selling Dreamcast game in Tec Toy's sales records, behind NBA 2K and Mortal Kombat Gold, according to research published by UOL in November 2004. The game went on to sell 500,000 copies worldwide, which Sega counted as a success.

The game received "mixed or average reviews" according to the review aggregation website GameRankings, earning a score of 70% based on 22 reviews. In Japan, Famitsu gave it a score of 28 out of 40. When mentioned, the plot and characters were cited as either enjoyable, or underwhelming. While the gameplay was generally enjoyed, several outlets faulted the puzzle design as obtuse. The camera system in both the Japanese and Western releases met with criticism, though the Western version was seen as less problematic. The real-time and CGI graphics together with monster designs met with overall praise, though the animation was seen as poor. The music met with general praise, but many faulted the voice acting for its poor quality. Several reviewers called the game a showcase for the Dreamcast's graphics that lacked compelling gameplay.

Jason D'Aprile of Gamecenter found Blue Stinger entertaining but not groundbreaking in its genre, describing it as "fun, interesting, and solid on the whole" despite camera issues holding it back. The reviewers for Electronic Gaming Monthly found the game generally inferior to game titles that influenced it, with one recommending that players wait for Resident Evil – Code: Veronica if they wanted a similar but higher quality experience. Edge similarly compared the game negatively to the upcoming Code Veronica, finding its combination of animation issues and inconsistent audio as "unacceptable" in games of the time. The Game Informer reviewers were fairly negative about several aspects of its design, with one highlighting its emphasis on graphics over gameplay and characters, feeling it was a lacking launch title. GameFan was again negative about the title and called it a weak title in the console's launch line-up.

GamePro was disappointed with its presentation issues, saying they turned Blue Stinger into "a flawed adventure game instead of the sure-fire launch hit that the Dreamcast needs." GameSpot's Peter Bartholow felt Blue Stinger was decent as a game, but lacked polish and depth, saying it would satisfy casual Dreamcast owners more than genre fans. GameSpy faulted the short length alongside other problems with its audio and graphic display, but did not think it was a bad game and kept the reviewer's interest throughout. Anoop Gantayat, writing for IGN, found the game as a whole enjoyable but dedicated much criticism to the camera and voice acting for detracting from the atmosphere. Jeff Lundrigan of Next Generation highlighted its strong points as the action-based gameplay and graphics rather than its story and tone.

In a feature for 1UP.com on Resident Evil "rip-offs", Bob Mackey felt the title was lacking elements to make it a true survival horror, and having too great a focus on combat and graphics. Gaming magazine and website Retro Gamer felt the title had become mislabelled as survival horror since its release, having enjoyable action gameplay and a strong narrative to engage players. Both highlighted the localization as adding to the game's appeal due to its inconsistent quality. In a 2015 retrospective on Nishigaki for Gamasutra, John Andersen noted the game's advanced graphics for the time, but that the camera changes and poor lip syncing had dated it.
