= Felony 11-79 =

1997 video game

Felony 11-79 / Runabout
- North American box art
- Developer: Climax Entertainment
- Publishers: JP: Yanoman; WW: ASCII Entertainment
- Director: Kazushige Inaba
- Designer: Kan Naitō
- Series: Runabout
- Platform: PlayStation
- Release: JP: May 29, 1997; NA: September 11, 1997; EU: December 1997
- Genre: Racing
- Mode: Single Player

Felony 11-79, known in Japan as Runabout (ランナバウト, Rannabauto), is a racing video game developed by Climax and published by Yanoman and ASCII for the PlayStation in 1997. It was part of a late 1990s wave of driving games which encourage the player to create chaos and destruction, being preceded by Die Hard Trilogy and Carmageddon. A sequel to the game, Runabout 2, was released in 2000.

== Gameplay ==
Felony 11-79 is a racing game that also has elements of adventure games.

The first release in the Runabout series was known as Felony 11-79 outside Asia, with Kan Naito as designer and producer. The game takes place in three separate gaming environments (known as Down Town, Sea Side, Metro City) with a test course while later games in the series use one city. Players spend the majority of game time unlocking numerous bonus vehicles. The players can choose the settings for the performance of the car, including steering, front and rear suspension, grip balance, acceleration and braking. Each car has its own performance rating (including horsepower, torque, length, weight, and fuel). The player may need to refuel the tank.

== Development ==
Though Climax were primarily developing games for the Sega Saturn at the time, they concluded the production of Runabout would be easier for that style of game using the PlayStation instead.

== Reception ==
Reception

Aggregate score
Aggregator	Score
GameRankings	71%

Review scores
Publication	Score
AllGame	3.5/5 stars
Edge	7/10
Electronic Gaming Monthly	6.5/10 (Note: In Electronic Gaming Monthly's review of the game, one critic gave it a score of 7/10, two critics gave it each a score of 6.5/10, and the other gave it 6/10.)
Famitsu	30/40
Game Informer	8.25/10
GameFan	86% (Note: In GameFan's early viewpoint of the game, two critics gave it each a score of 88, and the other 83.)
GameSpot	6.2/10
IGN	7/10
Next Generation	3/5 stars
Official U.S. PlayStation Magazine	3/5 stars

Critics almost unanimously commented that while Felony 11-79 has an enjoyable concept, the game is too lacking in longevity to be worth buying. Shawn Smith of Electronic Gaming Monthly argued that the game has plenty of replay value in the form of numerous unlockable cars, two unlockable tracks, and hidden routes, but the vast majority of reviewers (including all three of Smith's co-reviewers) pointed out that one can unlock all the tracks, play through the entire game with all the basic vehicle types, and explore all the routes in just two to five hours, and said they would rather have more tracks than the 20 unlockable cars. GamePro summarized the game as "a must-rent". (Note: GamePro gave the game two 4/5 scores for graphics and sound, and two 4.5/5 scores for control and fun factor.)

Some reviewers also complained at the fact that it is impossible to run over pedestrians, and Next Generation criticized that the story's ending is disappointingly brief and trite, given that Climax were known for their involved and original storylines. GameSpot and GamePro both praised the surf-rock soundtrack.

The game held a score of 71% on the review aggregation website GameRankings at the time of the site's 2019 closure, based on six reviews.
