= Runabout 2 =

1999 video game

- Developer: Climax Entertainment
- Publishers: JP: Climax; NA: Hot-B; EU: Midas Interactive
- Series: Runabout
- Platform: PlayStation
- Release: JP: November 18, 1999; NA: May 19, 2000; EU: February 2, 2003
- Genre: Racing
- Mode: Single-player

Runabout 2 is a racing video game developed by Climax Entertainment and released for the PlayStation in Japan on November 18, 1999 and in the US on May 19, 2000. It is the second game in the Runabout series.

The objective of the game is to drive from point A to B in a limited amount of time in order to pick up a certain item or deliver an item. Runabout 2 consists of 13 missions and the player must complete each mission in order to complete the game. Each stage contains many secrets and shortcuts and there are multiple routes through the missions in the game.

== Reception ==
The game received mixed reviews from critics.
