= Lady Stalker: Challenge from the Past =

1995 action-RPG video game

- Cover art
- Developer: Climax Entertainment
- Publisher: Taito
- Designer: Shinya Nishigaki
- Programmer: Kan Naito
- Artist: Hidehiro Yoshida
- Composer: Eri Sugai
- Platform: Super Famicom
- Release: JP: April 1, 1995
- Genre: Action role-playing game
- Mode: Single-player

Lady Stalker: Challenge from the Past (レディストーカー～過去からの挑戦～, Redi Sutōkā : Kako Kara no Chōsen) is an action role-playing game developed by Climax Entertainment and published by Taito for the Super Famicom in 1995. It is a spinoff of Landstalker and was designed with female gamers in mind. Challenge from the Past is the only game related to Landstalker that was never released outside Japan, though the main character appeared in the Dreamcast title Time Stalkers.

A sequel, Lady Stalker 2D: The Solitary Ruler of the Calendar, was announced in 2026, with a physical Famicom release planned following a successful kickstarter.

== Gameplay ==
While Lady Stalker shares the same isometric viewpoint with Landstalker, gameplay is remarkably different. Unlike Landstalker the player character cannot jump, abandoning the most prominent aspect of its predecessor compared to other games of the genre. Another important difference is the way combat initiates. Whereas in Landstalker the enemies are visible at all times and freely move around the map, in Lady Stalker the battles are randomly triggered and cannot be avoided until all enemies are defeated, shifting the gameplay focus more from its action-adventure-roots to an RPG style. Later in the game, Yoshio and Cox will assist the protagonist Lady in her quest, and both can be used and commanded in battle.

== Plot ==
The Lady Stalker storyline begins with Lady, a mischievous young girl who tends to disobey authority and travel around the world as an adventurer, despite the fact that she comes from a rich, upper-class family. She is constantly chased by her servants, the old gardener Yoshio and chef Cox. Lady's adventure involves her finding Deathland Island, a place that hides a treasure.

== Development ==
Many of the employees of Climax Entertainment had formerly worked for Enix. An initial pitch for the game was to create a spinoff of the 1990 Famicom game Dragon Quest IV that featured Princess Alena and her two companions. After this proposal was rejected, the game was made into its own intellectual property instead, and became Lady Stalker.

== Reception ==
On release, Famitsu scored the game a 28 out of 40, giving it a 7 out of 10 in their Reader Cross Review.
