= Landstalker =

1992 video game

- North American box art
- Developer: Climax Entertainment
- Publisher: Sega
- Director: Kenji Orimo
- Designer: Kenji Orimo
- Programmer: Kan Naito
- Artists: Yoshitaka Tamaki; Hidehiro Yoshida
- Writer: Shinya Nishigaki
- Composer: Motoaki Takenouchi
- Platform: Sega Genesis
- Release: JP: October 30, 1992; NA: October 1993; EU: November 1993
- Genre: Action-adventure
- Mode: Single-player

Landstalker: The Treasures of King Nole is a 1992 action role-playing video game developed by Climax Entertainment and published by Sega for the Sega Genesis. The player takes on the role of the treasure hunter Nigel as they navigate a three-dimensional world through an isometric viewpoint, solving puzzles and fighting enemies.

The game was a critical and commercial success. A spinoff called Lady Stalker: Challenge from the Past was released in Japan for the Super NES in 1995. A sequel was in the planning stages but was cancelled. Dark Savior and Alundra are considered spiritual successors. Nigel is a playable character in Time Stalkers.

It has been re-released several times: on the Wii's Virtual Console in 2007, on the Sega Genesis Mini in 2019, and on the Nintendo Classics service in 2023.

== Gameplay ==
The player, as Nigel the treasure hunter, is tasked with searching for clues that lead to the treasure of King Nole. This is accomplished primarily by travelling through both outdoor areas and dungeons. All gameplay and plot-advancing scenes take place in an isometric view.

From the outset of the game, Nigel may walk, jump, swing his sword, climb ropes and ladders, talk to various non-player characters, and pick up and throw various objects. With very few exceptions, these basic actions do not change throughout the game, although Nigel's weapons and armor may be replaced with better versions. There are a variety of items throughout the game, most of which either increase or restore health and attacking power or are important to advancing the plot or solving puzzles.

Much of the game's dungeons and overworld are filled with monsters, mostly creatures from fantasy and mythology like ogres, skeletons, ghosts, golems, and more; many may be avoided or killed for gold or other collectables, while others must be killed to advance the plot and the game. Many traps and puzzles also appear requiring the player to jump from platform to platform press switches and move blocks to climb on. Locked doors inhibit the player's progress, the player must find keys or beat enemies or puzzles to unlock them and progress further. Many dungeons and areas have a boss to defeat at the end. The monsters, puzzles and dungeons increase in difficulty as the game progresses. The player has health which is kept track of by hearts; health and the maximum health limit may be increased with items purchased in towns or found in dungeons. The player is not prevented from revisiting old towns and dungeons, and is frequently required to do so to advance the plot.

There are several optional side quests found in the game involving helping out the non-player characters. Nigel can complete these tasks for benefits, like increased attacking power and use of shortcut warps to travel across the overworld quicker. These can help the player but are not necessary to complete the game.

== Plot ==
In Gamul Date 312, Nigel, a treasure hunter who is 88 years old, far older than he appears, is traversing a dungeon of rolling boulders and moving platforms called Jypta Ruins to acquire the Statue of Jypta. After selling this statue to a shop owner in a port town of Kalva, Nigel is accosted by a wood nymph named Friday. She explains that she is being chased by three persistent yet bumbling thieves named Kayla, Ink, and Wally because she knows the location of the legendary treasure of King Nole. Once Nigel spends most of his money on a bird to carry him to the island, Friday admits that while she doesn't know the exact location of the treasure she has a "feeling" where it is. The player controls Nigel from here on where he and Friday, who accompanies him for the entire game, first journey through a dungeon until they fall into a river and end up in the care of the red-furred bear-people of Massan. When Nigel awakes, he finds his way to the neighboring village of Gumi, where the yellow-furred bear-people are ready to sacrifice the daughter of Massan's leader, Fara. Nigel follows the crazed tribe into their shrine and breaks them of their curse, freeing Fara and earning the respect of both tribes and a clue to help him to the treasure.

Nigel and Friday travel westward until they come to the lighthouse town of Ryuma which has been attacked by thieves. Nigel goes to the thieves' cave and rescues the mayor and some other men who have been kidnapped. He also finds a lithograph of a dragon, which Friday tells him is a clue to the treasure. Before he can leave, Kayla, Ink, and Wally show up and hold Friday hostage until Nigel hands them the lithograph.

Nigel's heroics earn him a place in the court of Duke Mercator, who orders him to go and defeat an old wizard, Mir, who is locked in a tower nearby and who has been terrorizing the town and extorting the Duke. Nigel braves a crypt and the wizard's tower and faces him in single combat. Defeated, Mir confesses all he knows about King Nole's treasure and then explains that the Duke is his brother and had been using him as a scapegoat for years. Nigel returns to the Duke and is about ready to confront him when he is tossed into a dungeon. While imprisoned he finds out that the princess of Maple, his home country, who had been a guest at the castle, has been taken away by the Duke's dragon-like henchman, Zak. He manages to escape to find the castle knights in open revolt and ships stuck in the harbour because the lighthouse in Ryuma is broken. Nigel saves Arthur, the Duke's general, and is given the key to the Greenmaze, where the Sunstone can be found, the gem that powers Ryuma's lighthouse.

Nigel navigates the maze despite the best efforts of troublesome gnomes and restores the lighthouse. He then takes a ship to pursue the Duke. He makes landing up the coast of the island at Verla, which has practically become a ghost town. The Duke had enslaved the population of the town and forced them to work in nearby mines searching for a legendary treasure. Nigel frees the townspeople, and they give him a legendary sword they found but had hidden from the Duke. Nigel continues through the mine to find the Duke sailing, via rafts, across a lake to an island temple. Nigel finds a way over and navigates through the labyrinth to fight the Duke but is caught off-guard by Zak. Nigel is teleported to safety by Mir before the Duke and Zak can finish him off. Mir then proceeds to give Nigel some more information about King Nole's treasure. Mir also gives a magical axe to Nigel which allows him to cut down trees with a single swing of his sword.

Nigel retakes his sword in hand, and Friday leads him up through mountains to get to the entrance to the underground dungeon where King Nole hid his treasure. They encounter Zak again, who has decided that while he doesn't like working for the Duke any longer he still wants to face Nigel one on one. After Nigel proves his superiority, Zak gives Nigel something he stole from the Duke that will allow Nigel to enter the underground. Zak departs defeated.

Nigel finds himself back at the same cave he started in, this time filled with monsters but no traps. He gets to the Duke just as he uses the Princess to open the gate between the above and below worlds (referencing the song In-A-Gadda-Da-Vida). Nigel charges through into the center of the island and into King Nole's labyrinth, a massive confusing dungeon guarding King Nole's palace. After making it through the labyrinth and the palace, Nigel makes it to the room which held the treasure. After all the challenges so far, things are not quite finished for King Nole's restless Spirit attacks Nigel but Nigel makes quick work of him. The Duke then shows up and as he thanks Nigel for doing the dirty work for him, Gola, the Dragon God that King Nole worshipped, burns him alive.

Nigel fights Gola using all of his strength and cunning, and when the beast is finally vanquished, the treasure is his. With vast sums of gold under his control he decides that rather than retire he and Friday will continue their adventures. In the original ending in the Japanese and European version the treasure vanishes after Gola's last stand. Nigel isn't very upset and suggests taking Friday with him to the main country for new adventures.

== Reception ==
Reception

Review scores
Publication	Score
Beep! MegaDrive	8/10
Dragon	3/5, 4/5
Famitsu	8/10, 8/10, 8/10, 9/10
Game Informer	8.75/10
GameFan	100%, 98%, 99%, 99% 100%, 92%, 94%, 94%
GamesMaster	84/100
Hyper	92%
Mean Machines Sega	94/100
Marukatsu Mega Drive	85/100, 75/100, 90/100, 90/100
Mega	92%
Mega Action	85%
Mega Drive Advanced Gaming	96%
MegaTech	93/100
MegaZone	90%
Sega Power	89%
Sega Pro	84%, 85%
Sega Zone	91/100, 90%

Retrospective reception

Aggregate score
Aggregator	Score
GameRankings	77%

Review scores
Publication	Score
Eurogamer	5/10
GameSpot	7/10
GameSpy	9/10
IGN	7.5/10
Nintendo Life	9/10
Retro Gamer	88%
RPGamer	4/5
RPGFan	84%

According to Famitsu and Next Generation, Landstalker was a major system seller for the Sega Mega Drive, selling 34,385 copies in its first week on the market and 160,000 copies during its lifetime in Japan. The game received a 25.28/30 score in a poll conducted by Mega Drive Fan and a 8.5064/10 score in a 1995 readers' poll conducted by the Japanese Sega Saturn Magazine, ranking among Mega Drive titles at the number 41 spot. It also garnered critical acclaim. GamePro's Lawrence Neves stated that "Landstalker will amaze you for hours with its complexity, amuse you with its graphics, and frustrate you with its controls".

In GameFan's annual Megawards, Landstalker won the awards for Most Innovative New Game (Sega) and Best Action/RPG, and was a nominee for the Best Music (Genesis) and Game of the Year awards. Mega placed the game at #5 in their Top Mega Drive Games of All Time. Gamasutra included it as an example of an open world game as part of their Game Design Essentials series. In 2017, Gamesradar ranked the game 24th on their: "Best Sega Genesis/Mega Drive games of all time."
