= Phatiah =

Nigerian singer and songwriter (born 2008)

Fatiah Kanyinsola Ojediran
- Born: 26 August 2008 (age 17); Omole, Lagos State, Nigeria
- Other names: Phatiah, Phatiah music.
- Occupations: Singer, Songwriter

Fatiah Kanyinsola Ojediran (born August 26, 2008) is a Nigerian singer and songwriter, professionally known as Phatiah, Phatiah music. She looks up to the likes of Tiwa Savage, Seyi shay and a lot of other female musicians.

== Education ==
She was born as Fatiah Kayinsola Ojediran on August 26, 2008, in Lagos State, Nigeria. She attended Starfield group of schools in Lagos for her primary and Junior secondary Education, and she went further to Ifako International Schools to continue her Senior Secondary Education.

== Career ==
At the age of five, the little Fatiah showed a keen interest in music and took it a step further in rhyming popular music lyrics. She declared her interest to become a musician who will influence people positively with her music.

Having expressed her desire, her parents set about providing the enabling environment for her to express her inmate talents for public consumption. She was mentored and tutored by her father, a Nigerian Music entrepreneur called Mr. Jamiu Ojediran alias Climax, and was signed under his management company Climax Entertainment in 2019 with the stage name Phatiah.

She gained an audience when she began to innovate and promote conscious pop music in Nigeria.

She made a plea to the government to provide adequate care for children who she says are the future in her song “Leaders of Tomorrow” with the aim of drawing the attention of the public and humanity to the plight of children in a way that meets the objectives of UNICEF.

In an interview with the BBC What's New team, Phatiah insisted she is still very motivated by Social Change despite facing challenges from friends, well wishers and family but remains steadfast because of the love and support she gets which motivates her drive for her music.

She launched her international performance with stunning one at the “A Thousand Hill Festival” in Rwanda.

== Discography ==
In August 2018, track titled “Education” which was released on the stables of Climax Entertainments in August 2018. Her works are:

- Education (2018)
- Leaders of Tomorrow (2020)*
- JEJE featuring Destiny Boy (2021)*
- Hallelujah featuring Zlatan Ibile (2022)*

== Professional life ==
Awards, Nominations and Recognition

- Enya Kid Artiste of the year 2019
- Arise O Nigeria Most Outstanding Kid in Philanthropy of the Year 2018
- Cool Wealth Kid Artiste of the Year Awards 2019
- Enya award Kid Entertainer Year 2020
