= Climax Graphics =

Japanese video game developer

Crazy Games
- Company logo (2001-2002)
- Native name: 株式会社クレイジーゲーム
- Romanized name: Kabushiki gaisha Kureijī Gēmu
- Formerly: Climax Graphics (1996-2001)
- Type: Independent
- Industry: Video games
- Founded: 1 December 1996; 29 years ago
- Founder: Shinya Nishigaki
- Defunct: December 2002; 23 years ago
- Fate: Dissolved
- Headquarters: Tokyo, Japan
- Key people: Shinya Nishigaki (CEO, 1996–2002)
- Products: Blue Stinger; Illbleed
- Number of employees: 23 (2002)

Climax Graphics Inc., (Note: Japanese: 株式会社クライマックス・グラフィックス, Hepburn: Kabushiki gaisha Kuraimakkusu Gurafikkusu) renamed Crazy Games Inc. (Note: Japanese: 株式会社クレイジーゲーム, Hepburn: Kabushiki gaisha Kureijī Gēmu) in 2001, was a Japanese video game developer based in Tokyo. Established in December 1996 by Shinya Nishigaki as an independent "brother company" of Climax Entertainment. The staff were made up of CGI developers who had worked on Climax Entertainment's Dark Savior. Their debut project, the action-adventure Blue Stinger, began production for the Sega Saturn, but on encouragement from Sega it shifted to becoming an early Dreamcast title.

Following Blue Stinger's successful release, Nishigaki led development on the survival horror Illbleed, which ended up releasing shortly before the Dreamcast's discontinuation in 2001 to poor sales and reception. That same year the company changed its name to Crazy Games to distinguish itself from Climax Entertainment. Crazy Games would co-develop the arcade title The Maze of the Kings with Hitmaker before closing in December 2002 due to the uncertain Japanese economy at that time. Nishigaki and his staff moved to Cavia and were working on a new project, but Nishigaki died in 2004 from a heart attack.

== History ==
Climax Graphics was founded by Shinya Nishigaki, a former advertising staff member who had moved into game development at Enix and then at Climax Entertainment, where he worked as a producer and writer on the Landstalker series and Dark Savior. Following the release of Dark Savior in 1996, Nishigaki and a collection of staff members from Climax Entertainment's CGI section decided to form a new studio that would create new graphics-focused titles, beginning pre-production on their first game in September 1996. Climax Graphics was officially founded on December 1, 1996. While sharing a name with Climax Entertainment and being referred to at one point as a "brother studio", Nishigaki referred to Climax Graphics as an independent developer. The studio was based in Shinjuku, Tokyo, with Nishigaki as its CEO.

Their first game, an action adventure game titled Blue Stinger, was originally in development for the Sega Saturn. During talks, console owner Sega requested that the game be made for their upcoming Dreamcast console, prompting the developers to restart production as a Dreamcast title in 1997. Nishigaki drew inspiration from his love of Western action movies, with its reworked design also drawing inspiration from Resident Evil and Enemy Zero. In addition to the eighteen staff of Climax Graphics, they collaborated with external staff including Robert Short for monster designs and Toshihiko Sahashi for the score. For its Western release, publisher Activision insisted that the existing pre-set camera angles be replaced by a behind-the-player camera that Nishigaki disliked. When Blue Stinger released, it saw commercial success in North America, going on to see 500,000 copies worldwide. Sega contacted Nishigaki about developing a sequel, but he was already focused on his new project.

Climax Graphic's next title was Illbleed, a survival horror inspired by both Nishigaki's love of movies and horror-themed amusement parks. Production began in 1999, taking one and a half years to complete, and constituting extensive research and meetings. Illbleed was originally to be published by Sega, but it was dropped due to quality concerns. Climax Graphics ultimately self-published the game in Japan, and after several changes it was published in North America by AIA. Nishigaki described Blue Stinger and Illbleed as "very different games" despite sharing a combination of action and puzzle elements. To separate itself further from Climax Entertainment, the company's name was changed to Crazy Games in February 2001, a month before Illbleed's Japanese release. Illbleed released to mixed reviews and low sales, which Nishgaki was not concerned by, but both Nishigaki and AIA were disappointed at Sega discontinuing the Dreamcast console the year of the game's release.

Following the Dreamcast's discontinuation, Sega continued to support Crazy Games during internal restructuring taking place at the time. Following Illbleed, Nishigaki wanted to create a horror-themed title for arcades. With development assistance from Sega's arcade division Hitmaker, Crazy Games developed The Maze of the Kings, an Ancient Egypt-themed light gun shooter that released for Sega's NAOMI arcade cabinets in May 2002. The Maze of the Kings never saw a Western release or console port, and was the last title developed by Crazy Games before closing down in December 2002. The company was closed by Nishigaki due to the uncertain state of the Japanese economy at the time.

On the recommendation of Hitmaker's then-CEO Hisao Oguchi, Nishigaki and the other Crazy Games staff were hired by Cavia, with Nishigaki beginning work on a new project focused on the Japanese market. Nishigaki died of a heart attack on February 14, 2004, leaving the project unfinished. Plans to port expanded versions of Blue Stinger and Illbleed to the Xbox by Coolnet Entertainment were shelved following Nishigaki's death; a given reason was the Xbox's poor commercial performance in Japan.

== Games developed ==
Year	Title	Platform(s)	Notes
1999	Blue Stinger	Dreamcast	
2001	Illbleed	Dreamcast	
2002	The Maze of the Kings	Arcade	Co-developed with Hitmaker.

=== Game reception ===
Reviews of Blue Stinger gave praise to its graphics and music, but most faulted its camera controls in both the Japanese and Western versions. While Blue Stinger was designed and marketed as an action-adventure game, its presentation and premise caused it to be later labelled as survival horror. Gaming magazine and website Retro Gamer felt the title had become mislabelled as survival horror since its release, having enjoyable action gameplay and a strong narrative to engage players.

Reception of Illbleed was fairly mixed, with several critics highlighting its atmosphere and alternate take on the survival horror genre, but faulting the controls and audio design; most also noted its unconventional tone. In 2015, Daniel Kurland of Bloody Disgusting highlighted Illbleed as one of several innovative titles from the Dreamcast's final year, and a mechanical precursor to later horror titles including Michigan: Report From Hell and Until Dawn. In an IGN preview of The Maze of the Kings, Anoop Gantayat noted a lack of original elements beyond its aesthetic design and the use of magical staffs rather than guns in-game as weapons. On a 2018 Retro Gamer article on unported arcade titles, The Maze of Kings was described as standard for the light gun genre despite the aesthetic differences, and coming too late to see profitable ports to other systems or overseas.

In a 2012 feature for 1UP.com on Resident Evil "rip-offs", Bob Mackey felt Blue Stinger was lacking elements to make it a true survival horror, and having too great a focus on combat and graphics. Mackey additionally recommended Illbleed as a unique take on survival horror. In a 2015 retrospective on Shinigaki for Gamasutra, John Andersen noted that while Blue Stinger had aged poorly due to its camera issues and voice acting, Illbleed had become a cult classic due to its unconventional tone and gameplay.
