= Kingdom of Paradise =

2005 video game

Key of Heaven
- Developer: Climax Entertainment (Note: Additional work by Sony Computer Entertainment Japan)
- Publisher: Sony Computer Entertainment
- Platform: PlayStation Portable
- Release: JP: July 21, 2005; NA: November 15, 2005; EU: March 24, 2006; AU: March 30, 2006
- Genre: Action role-playing
- Mode: Single-player

Kingdom of Paradise, released as Tenchi no Mon (天地の門) in Japan and Key of Heaven in Europe, is an action role-playing video game developed by Climax Entertainment and published by Sony for the PlayStation Portable in 2005. It was re-released as a PlayStation Network title for PS4 and PS5 in September 20, 2022. A prequel is available in Japan, Korea, and China called Tenchi no Mon 2: Busōden.

Heavily influenced by Asian culture in general, and Chinese Wuxia fantasy in particular, the game contains clans named after the Ssu Ling. The fifth clan is named Kirin and is not part of the group.

== Story ==
The story of this game takes place in an almost feudal China, which is simulated through the fictitious world of Ouka. The continent of Ouka is separated into five divisions: Northern (Genbu), Eastern (Seiryu), Southern (Suzaku) Western (Byakko) and Central (Kirin). Each of the five divisions has a Clan Lord, clan disciples, a particular style of Chi and sword fighting and a sacred sword. It is later revealed that each sword – except the Kirin Sacred Sword – controls one of the Four Gods of Ouka. There is also reference to the continent of Seima, which is said to be somewhere over the sea to the west of Ouka. Nobody who has ever tried to find Seima has returned. Three hundred years previously there is said to have been the Seima-Ouka war, in which the Clan Lords of Ouka prevailed. However, nobody was alive three hundred years ago to recount the mysterious events of the war – except the Kirin Lord Gikyo and the Seiman twins, Lu Yan and Li Yin (who are over three hundred years old but look deceptively young in the game because they "are able to sustain [them]selves on the chi of the yin and yang moons" as told by Gikyo. Their very names are references to yin and yang – Lu Yan representing the righteous Yang while Li Yin is the mischievous Yin side). The Forbidden Poem, written by Lu Yan and Li Yin, speaks of the war, reading:

Five great gates of Ouka be,

Name them here for all to see;
Seiryu, Byakko and Genbu
Kirin and Suzaku be there too;
At Heaven’s gate twin keys you need;
At Earth’s gates, bows the Divine Steed;
The soul is born as the Yang moon whirls
The body is born as the Yin moon twirls
The twin moons make a mighty hum

From the watery moon, it doth come.

The main character, Shinbu, has been exiled from his clan, the Seiryu, after looking at the Ancient Monument, which holds the secrets of the Seiryu Chi Arts. The surviving disciple named Sui Lin tracks down Shinbu to tell him that their clan was destroyed, and they're the only two survivors. They also later discover that their sacred sword has been stolen (as, later on, the other three clans'). On a quest to find out who destroyed their clan, Shinbu and Sui Lin go to warn the three other clans that the ruling Kirin clan is rising in power and plans to steal each clan's sacred sword, each containing unimaginable power, to overthrow them all.

A note of dynasty here, every sixteen years, the clans' power change hands. Last time it was the Suzaku rule, so the ruling clan is the Kirin. As with the complementary cycle, the rule of clans goes in the said cycle.

== Gameplay ==
Gameplay is based around a system called Bugei scrolls. Each Bugei scroll uses Kenpu tiles to make a series of martial arts maneuvers (Up to a limit of 10 by using a Freestyle Bugei). Players collect Bugei and Kenpu as they progress through the game; Bugei is mostly found in cinematic sequences, while Kenpu is won from battles and hidden in pots, chests, and other breakable objects.

Shinbu also uses a form of magic called Chi Arts which the player learns from a sacred stone in each clan's temple, and uses it in battle. The player holds down the square button to charge chi and presses it again to use it, usually causing large amounts of damage. As the player's chi arts become stronger, they can eventually wipe out most enemies in 1 or 2 hits.

Players gain levels (up to level 20) by defeating enemies. Upon gaining a level, the player's Mind, Technique, and Body attributes raise depending on how the player fought battles prior to each level up. For example, if a player uses nothing but Chi Arts, his Mind attribute will raise more than the other two (Up to a total of 200).

Throughout the game, players also collect various accessories that they can equip to increase their attributes. In addition to this, players can purchase other swords, which may or may not do more damage than Shinbu's Ginmei Sword, or they can upgrade the Ginmei sword by taking it to a blacksmith. However, certain enemies, as emphasized all over Ouka, can only be hurt by the Ginmei Sword, such as clan gods along with other enemies.

=== Elements ===
Chi arts is what Shinbu acquires as he progresses through the story. The Chi Arts system is a complementary and rival system. The rival system is formed as a star while the complementary is formed into a circle. Shinbu can also use Chi Arts when he buys a Level 1 chi art charm. The Chi Arts system is used to defeat certain enemies very quickly. The five elements are wood, fire, earth, metal, and water. Wood defeats earth, but weak against metal. Fire is strong against metal, but weak against water. Earth triumphs over water but cowers wood. Metal defeats wood, but is poorly fared against fire. Water is strong against fire, but will be weak against earth. The complementary system is only used in bugei scrolls. It must go in a clockwise circle or it is not a cycle. Complementary elements can also charge an attack, making the final attack in the combo the most devastating finisher.

== Reception ==
Reception

Aggregate score
| Aggregator | Score |
|---|---|
| Metacritic | 72/100 |

Review scores
| Publication | Score |
|---|---|
| Edge | 4/10 |
| Electronic Gaming Monthly | 6.67/10 |
| Eurogamer | 6/10 |
| Famitsu | 26/40 |
| Game Informer | 6.75/10 |
| GameRevolution | C |
| GameSpot | 8/10 |
| GameSpy | 3.5/5 |
| GameTrailers | 8.8/10 |
| GameZone | 8/10 |
| IGN | 7.8/10 |
| Official U.S. PlayStation Magazine | 4/5 |
| RPGamer | 1.5/5 |
| RPGFan | 78/100 |

The game received "average" reviews according to the review aggregation website Metacritic. In Japan, Famitsu gave it a score of one seven, two sixes, and one seven for a total of 26 out of 40.
