= Steal Princess =

2008 video game

- North American cover art
- Developer(s): Climax Entertainment
- Publisher(s): JP: Marvelous Entertainment; NA: Atlus
- Platform(s): Nintendo DS
- Release: JP: July 31, 2008; NA: May 19, 2009
- Genre(s): Puzzle, platform
- Mode(s): Single-player

Steal Princess (Note: Japanese: スティールプリンセス～盗賊皇女～, Hepburn: Sutīru Purinsesu ～Tōzoku Ōjo～; Steal Princess: Tōzoku Ōjo) is a puzzle-based platform game developed by Climax Entertainment.

== Gameplay ==
The game is divided into larger areas that are subdivided into multiple levels. Levels are short and generally only take a few minutes to complete. The goal often involves defeating a set of enemies and activating switches in order to gain access to the level's exit. The puzzle elements in the first few levels combine to form more complex puzzles as the game progresses. There is also a level editor feature to allow players to create their own puzzles and share them on the Nintendo Wi-Fi Connection network.

== Plot ==
Anise, a master thief, accidentally triggers a booby-trap in the palace of the Ancient Demon King. She barely escapes and is knocked unconscious. A fairy named Kukri rescues her and takes her to Albyon Castle. Kukri claims that Anise is a descendant of the Legendary Hero of Albyon and thus, the king commands her to save the prince who was captured by the demons in the Demon King's palace.

== Development ==
In December 2008, the ESRB leaked the announcement of three games which Atlus would be releasing in North America, including the announcement of Steal Princess. A week after the leak, Atlus jokingly said in a press release that all future release announcements would be made via the ESRB website. Steal Princess was officially announced on January 15, 2009 with a release date scheduled for March 24, 2009. Three of Atlus's game's releases were rescheduled in February 2009, including Steal Princess whose new release date was April 21, 2009. Atlus announced in May that they would be delaying Steal Princess by a few weeks, until May 19, to allow more time to advertise the game. To appease gamers who were counting on the April 21 release, a free mini-poster was packaged with the game.

== Reception ==
Reception

Aggregate score
Aggregator	Score
Metacritic	60/100

Review scores
Publication	Score
Famitsu	28/40
GamePro	3/5 stars
GameZone	6.9/10
IGN	6.7/10
NGamer	63%
Nintendo Power	6/10
Nintendo World Report	6/10
Official Nintendo Magazine	72%
RPGamer	1.5/5
The A.V. Club	B

The game received "mixed" reviews according to the review aggregation website Metacritic. In Japan, Famitsu gave it a score of 28 out of 40.
