= Illbleed =

2001 video game

- North America cover art
- Developer: Crazy Games
- Publishers: JP: Crazy Games; NA: AIA
- Director: Tetsuro Sugimori
- Producer: Shinya Nishigaki
- Programmer: Kazuaki Yokozawa
- Artists: Ryosuke Murakami; Masaki Segawa
- Writer: Shinya Nishigaki
- Composer: Yukinori Kikuchi
- Platform: Dreamcast
- Release: JP: March 29, 2001; NA: April 16, 2001
- Genre: Survival horror
- Mode: Single-player

Illbleed (Note: Japanese: イルブリード, Hepburn: Iruburīdo) is a survival horror game developed by Crazy Games and released for the Dreamcast in 2001. It was published by Crazy Games in Japan and Amusement Interface Associate (AIA) in North America. The game follows Eriko Christy, a high school student who explores a horror-themed amusement park to find her missing friends. The player explores six haunted house attractions based on fictional horror films, detecting and neutralizing hidden traps and enemies which can harm or frighten Eriko and her friends.

Crazy Games was known as Climax Graphics until a month before Illbleed's release. As Climax Graphics, they developed and published Blue Stinger (1999), an action-adventure game for the Dreamcast. The team wanted to explore horror themes in their next game, and so drew inspiration from haunted house attractions and horror films to create an original scenario that would differentiate it from other horror games.

Illbleed was released in the months following Sega's discontinuation of the Dreamcast. It received mixed reviews, with praise for its original concept, dark humor, camp style, and horror B movie qualities, but criticism for its game design, controls, and playability. It was a commercial failure, only selling a tenth of Blue Stinger's figures; a port for the Xbox was planned, but canceled. In retrospective, modern reviews for Illbleed have been more positive, with praise towards the game's originality and difficulty. The original game has also become a high-valued and sought after collector's item.

== Gameplay ==
Eriko stands in front of a stage entrance for the game's second level

In Illbleed, the player explores six stages, each an amusement park attraction themed after a different fictional horror film, and complete objectives unique to each one. The player begins by controlling the protagonist, Eriko Christy, but as they progress, they rescue and recruit more playable characters, each with their own strengths and weaknesses. Items can be found throughout levels or purchased at the park's grandstand, which serves as a hub world. Items include text that tells the story, event items needed to complete a stage objective, or recovery items that can heal the player character. The player can purchase recovery items and character upgrades from the "Emergency Room" in each stage and the hub world.

Illbleed has been described as a survival horror game. In contrast to contemporary games in the genre, Illbleed prioritizes locating and neutralizing traps over combat; a level's trap locations, enemies, and items are randomized. Different types of traps and enemies can affect the player character's stamina, heart rate, or bleeding rate. Physical damage reduces stamina and increases bleeding, while frightening moments increase heart rate. High bleeding rates cause stamina and heart rate to fall. If the bleeding reaches a certain threshold or they lose all their stamina, the character dies. If their heart rate increases too much, they die of a heart attack, or faint if it drops too low. If the player fails to keep the character alive, they must continue with another available character. Dead characters can be revived outside the level. If there are no remaining characters, the game ends and must be restarted from a previous save point.

To avoid hazards, the player must watch a sensory feedback monitor which indicates the senses of sight, hearing, smell, and a sixth sense. When the player approaches an item or potential hazard, different senses can react on the sensory monitor. The player uses the Horror Monitor, which is found near the beginning of each stage, to dismantle traps. The Horror Monitor allows the player to mark areas for potential traps and enemies at the cost of adrenaline. The player can survey any spot marked; if a trap was there, it is disabled and the spent adrenaline returns to the character. Marking enemies grants the player a first strike advantage when entering battle. Engaging enemies places the game into a combat mode with unique controls, in which the player must neutralize the enemy or escape by calling for a helicopter from a helipad. Winning a battle grants the character adrenaline.

== Plot ==
Eriko Christy is a high school student and horror aficionado. As a child, her family ran a "horror caravan", a traveling horror-themed amusement attraction; her father tested horror gimmicks on her, traumatizing her and causing her to become desensitized to fear. When she was six years old, her mother divorced her father and took Eriko, estranging the two. In the present, Eriko's friends Kevin, Randy, and Michel invite her to Illbleed, a new horror amusement park. Its creator, the horror film producer Michael Reynolds, offers a reward of $100 million to anyone who can successfully reach the end of the park. Eriko declines the invitation, assuming it is a cheap publicity stunt, and her friends set out for the park, leaving her behind with her ticket. After not hearing from them for several days, Eriko goes to the park to investigate.

In the park, Eriko explores haunted house attractions themed after horror films, having the opportunity to save each of her friends along the way. If she saves all three and a reporter, Jorg, (Note: Jorg is named after the real-life journalist Jorg S. Tittel, who did publicity work for the game.) she and her friends win the prize money, but she states that she is returning to Illbleed and tells them not to follow. This initiates a new game plus mode, wherein Eriko meets Michael Reynolds and discovers he is her father. Reynolds explains he built Illbleed out of his obsession to scare Eriko. Eriko scares Reynolds in return, causing him to transform into a monster, which Eriko defeats. Admitting that the monster scared her, she leaves the park. Some time after, Eriko has now become a timid, easily frightened girl, with Kevin swearing to look after her.

== Development ==
Illbleed was developed for the Dreamcast by Tokyo-based game developer Crazy Games under the leadership of its founder and producer Shinya Nishigaki. The company was known as Climax Graphics until one month before the game's release. The team began working on Illbleed after completing their first Dreamcast game, Blue Stinger (1999), which was published by Sega in Japan. They considered making a sequel to Blue Stinger, which Sega had requested after its commercial success in the West. However, they elected to make an original horror game instead. Illbleed's production took place in Shinjuku, Tokyo and lasted a year and a half. At its peak, Crazy Games had 23 staff working on the game. Programmer Kazuaki Yokozawa designed a new game engine in an effort to alleviate many of the issues in Blue Stinger, such as the camera. This also allowed for higher frame rates and the ability to show more effects and objects on screen.

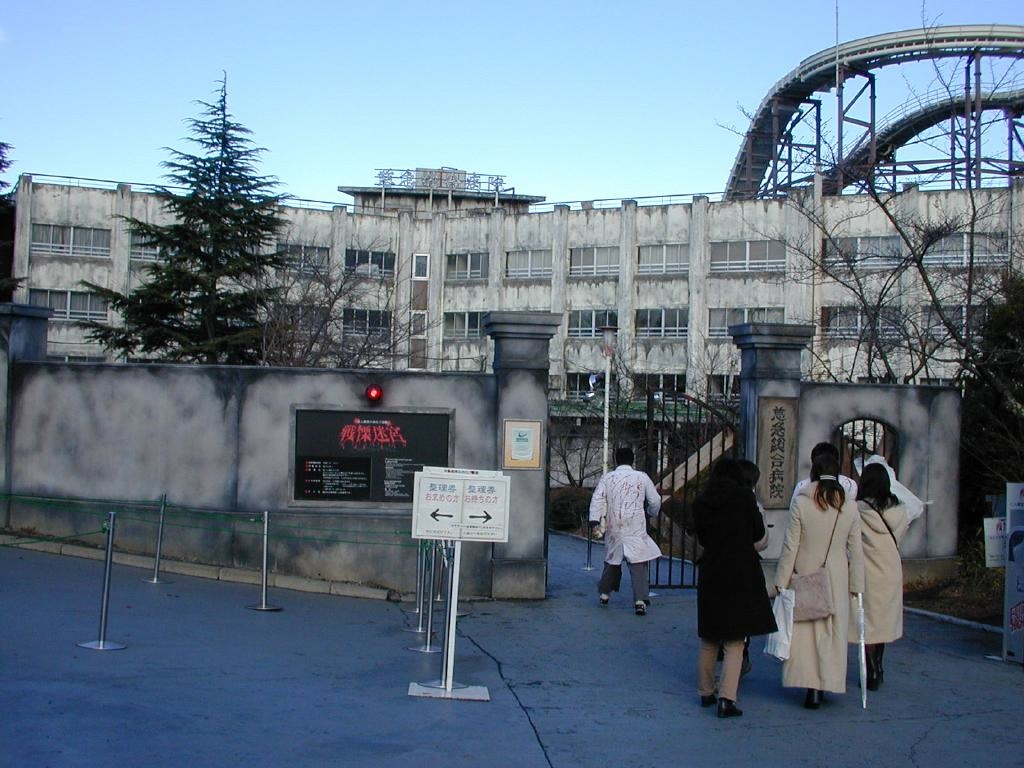
Haunted house attractions, like this haunted hospital at Fuji-Q Highland, were key inspirations for Illbleed.

The team had avoided horror elements in Blue Stinger to distinguish it from horror adventure games on the market like Resident Evil, but they decided to wholly embrace horror for Illbleed. At the time, horror media was undergoing a renaissance as a result of the success of films such as Ring (1998) and Spiral (1998) in Japan, and Scream (1996) in the United States. Wanting a game with jump scares, the team decided to create an elaborate haunted house game that simulated the haunted house attractions seen in amusement parks. They visited haunted house attractions at Fuji-Q Highland in Yamanashi for inspiration, and studied how attractions are designed to play with attendees' expectations. They also drew influence from 1980s American horror films and B movies. Nishigaki, a film aficionado, cited the directorial styles of James Cameron, Steven Spielberg, George Lucas, Hayao Miyazaki, and Akira Kurosawa as influences.

== Release ==
Illbleed was announced in April 2000 at Tokyo Game Show. A playable demo was demonstrated at E3 that year and at the Tokyo Game Show in September 2000. Although Crazy Games originally expected Sega to localize the game due to Blue Stinger's success, Sega of America dropped Illbleed from its localization lineup in mid-2000, citing a crowded first-party release schedule. Despite this, Sega felt it was a strong game that would get picked up by a third-party publisher, and soon Crazy Games had offers from five different publishers to localize it. Jaleco obtained the rights to the game, but was struggling financially and was bought out by PCCW. Former Jaleco executives founded Amusement Interface Associate (AIA) and its subsidiary AIA USA in early 2001, which ultimately localized the game.

Crazy Games self-published Illbleed in Japan on March 29, 2001 for the Dreamcast, two months after Sega announced it was discontinuing the platform. It was released in North America by AIA USA one month later. A Chinese-language edition was released in January 2002. Crazy Games also released an action figure of Eriko Christy, which was limited to 1,000 figures. Illbleed was a commercial failure, only selling 50,000 copies worldwide, a tenth of Blue Stinger's sales.

Ports of Illbleed and Blue Stinger were under development for the Xbox by the Japanese developer Coolnet Entertainment. Despite the port of Illbleed reportedly being 90% complete, the ports were canceled due to Nishigaki's death in 2004 and the Xbox's poor performance in Japan.

== Reception ==
Reception

Aggregate score
Aggregator	Score
Metacritic	61/100

Review scores
Publication	Score
Consoles +	75%
Edge	6/10
Electronic Gaming Monthly	7.5/10, 6/10, 7/10
EP Daily	7/10
Famitsu	6/10, 6/10, 8/10, 8/10
Game Informer	5/10
Gamekult	6/10
GameSpot	6/10
GameSpy	7/10
IGN	6.7/10
Next Generation	3/5
Dreamcast Magazine (JP)	8/10
Dreamcast Magazine (UK)	87%

Illbleed received "mixed or average reviews", according to the video game review aggregator Metacritic. Many critics praised its willingness to stray from the typical survival horror gameplay of the time, by forgoing combat and puzzle-solving segments in favor of trap detection and avoidance. Electronic Gaming Monthly (EGM) wrote that Illbleed "picks up the dying survival horror torch, douses it in gasoline, and throws it into your treehouse, laughing all the while". Next Generation described the survival horror genre as becoming "almost as ubiquitous as first-person shooters", and felt Illbleed successfully set itself apart. GameSpy agreed, saying the genre needed some kind of innovation, and felt that Illbleed's new gameplay elements and unique humor made it original. GamePro said that the game "scores major points for twisted originality, even if unfocused and clunky execution keeps it from turning horror on its gory, severed ear." (Note: GamePro gave the game two 3.5/5 scores for graphics and fun factor, 4/5 for sound, and 2.5/5 for control.)

The most-praised elements included the campy B movie style, twisted dark humor, and gratuitous use of blood. GameSpot called the offbeat presentation Illbleed's most redeeming quality, writing that "gratuitous use of luscious, spurting blood sets its B movie tone perfectly". EGM described the game as "psychotically gorgeous" and "freaking bizarre". Dreamcast Magazine (UK) summarized the game in one word, "excess", explaining that everything in the game was "insane" and "over-the-top". GameSpy and GameSpot observed that the game was self-aware of its camp qualities and fully embraced it. While the voice acting was panned by EGM and GameSpy, Dreamcast Magazine felt it contributed to its campy quality. Both EGM and Next Generation wrote that the game had a low budget feel which made it feel in the same vein as the B-movies that inspired it.

Illbleed's game design and controls were criticized. Critics said the stiff jump mechanics, the stark difference between walking and running, and the camera system all contributed to frustration. IGN wrote that it could be difficult to enjoy the game while these problems interrupted the experience. Edge described the room-to-room exploration as a repetitive "minesweeping" exercise of tagging traps, but felt it worked generally well except for a lack of checkpoints. GameSpot and GameSpy criticized what they called "stop and go" pacing: needing to stop and scan rooms for traps upon entering them, before being able to proceed.

Critics recommended Illbleed to players who can appreciate schlock horror and ignore technical flaws. GameSpot wrote that whether players enjoy the game depends on their "affinity for slapstick horror" and "tolerance for tedium." Producer Shinya Nishigaki said of the reception: "Illbleed requires a high degree of intelligence to play [...] It was just an entire mix of entertainment that many people couldn't understand. To me, the negative reviews of the game did not affect me at all." The game has amassed a cult following.

In retrospective reviews, Illbleed has been re-evaluated by several critics. In a 2023 review, Nicholas Owen for GameRant reviewed the game in 2023, citing Illbleed as an enjoyable and challenging game with replay value, writing: "Illbleed is definitely one of the weirdest horror games of all time, and it's a shame that it will become more and more difficult to find." In 2026, Mandi Odoerfer for CBR praised the game's utilization of awareness, claiming that "Illbleed should have been a horror hit, but because it was released in 2001, after Sega announced it was discontinuing the Dreamcast, it wound up flying under the radar."

== Legacy ==
Due to the discontinuation of the Sega Dreamcast and the game releasing months prior to the console's discontinuation, Illbleed did not see many physical copies on store shelves. Due to the limited quantity of physical copies of the game, Illbleed has become a highly sought-after collector's item. As of 2026, English copies of Illbleed have been recorded for selling upwards of US$350.
