= Sonic Shuffle =

2000 video game

- North American box art
- Developer: Sega (Note: Hudson Soft assisted on development.)
- Publisher: Sega
- Producers: Hirokazu Kojima; Shuji Utsumi
- Designer: Hidenori Oikawa
- Programmer: Yasuhiro Kosaka
- Artist: Hisashi Kubo
- Series: Sonic the Hedgehog
- Platform: Dreamcast
- Release: NA: November 13, 2000; JP: December 21, 2000; PAL: March 9, 2001
- Genre: Party
- Modes: Single-player, multiplayer

Sonic Shuffle (Note: Japanese: ソニックシャッフル, Hepburn: Sonikku Shaffuru) is a 2000 party video game developed and published by Sega for the Dreamcast. A spin-off of the Sonic the Hedgehog series, the game plays like a board game similar to Nintendo's Mario Party series, with up to four players moving their characters across a game board filled with a variety of spaces which can trigger different events. Some spaces will launch minigames that pit the players against each other in short competitive events.

Sega contracted Hudson Soft, the developers of Mario Party, to assist with development. The game's graphics use the same cel shading technique first seen in Jet Set Radio (2000). An online multiplayer mode was planned, but it was cancelled so the game could launch in time for the 2000 holiday season. Sonic Shuffle received mixed reviews from critics. Although it was praised for its graphics, the game's long load times and poorly explained, overly complex minigames were found to be significantly detrimental to the overall experience. Reviewers classified Sonic Shuffle as an inferior clone of Mario Party.

== Gameplay ==
Sonic walking across a minigame space

Sonic Shuffle is a party game for up to four players, playing like a board game in a similar fashion to the Mario Party series. The game is set in a dream world called "Maginaryworld", where the fairy Lumina Flowlight asks Sonic the Hedgehog, Tails, Knuckles the Echidna, and Amy Rose to retrieve "Precioustones" to help her save Maginaryworld from Void, the game's villain. The players can choose to play as one of these four characters, or Big the Cat, E-102 Gamma, Super Sonic, and a Chao if unlocked later. Each character has unique abilities they can use to traverse the game boards.

Players take turns moving across the board in an effort to collect the most Precioustones; this is done by picking cards and moving the amount of spaces specified on it. Each player is dealt seven cards at a time, and their deck is visible on their personal VMU screen in their controller, keeping it a secret from other players. (Note: If a player does not have a VMU, their cards are shown on the television screen for all to see.) When it is a player's turn to move, they can choose to play a card from their hand, or play a random card from another player's hand. There is also a card which can be used to steal cards, swap hands with another player, or move one to seven spaces as decided by a short slot machine style game. Finally, there is a card that will summon Doctor Eggman, who will steal the player's rings or swap their position on the board with another player.

There are a variety of different spaces on the board. The most common spaces increase or subtract the player's ring count. Rings can be used to purchase power-ups in the form of "forcejewels" at special shop spaces. These stones can give the player numerous advantages, such as selecting more than one card in one turn or teleporting to other players' positions. Battle spaces pit the player that lands on the space in a short card game against an enemy. There is also always one space that harbors a Precioustone. When one of these is collected by a player, another one is placed on the board. The goal of each game is to collect the most Precioustones.

Finally there are minigame spaces. These spaces will launch a random minigame with either all the players, or just the player that landed on the space. The solo minigames are story-like sequences where the player must answer a question to win rings or gems, or lose them if answered wrong. The minigames that involve all the players come in a wide variety. Some are free-for-all games, while others pit the players against each other in two-versus-two or one-versus-three situations.

== Development and release ==
Sonic Shuffle was developed by Sega, with assistance from the Hudson Soft team behind Mario Party (1998), and supervision from Sonic Team. Most sources attributed Sega as the developer although some attributed the game to Sega's internal development team Smilebit. Smilebit had previously developed Jet Set Radio (2000) for the Dreamcast which was well regarded for its cel shaded visuals. Sega used the same cel shading techniques in Sonic Shuffle.

Sega revealed that a Sonic Adventure spin-off was in development alongside Sonic Adventure 2 in October 1999. The game was revealed in the June 2000 issue of Electronic Gaming Monthly (EGM) with the tentative title Sonic Square, shortly before the E3 trade fair that year. Sega had planned to reveal information about Sonic Adventure 2 to EGM for the issue, but decided the game was not ready to be shown, and shared Sonic Square instead. Support for online multiplayer through SegaNet was planned, it was ultimately cut so the game could ship ahead of the 2000 holiday season. Sonic Shuffle was released for the Dreamcast in North America on November 14, 2000, in Japan on December 21, and in Europe on March 9, 2001. The game was expected to appear in the 2002 compilation Sonic Mega Collection, but was ultimately not included.

== Reception ==
Reception

Aggregate score
Aggregator	Score
Metacritic	54/100

Review scores
Publication	Score
CNET Gamecenter	4/10
Electronic Gaming Monthly	5.17/10 (Note: Three critics of Electronic Gaming Monthly gave the game each a score of 5.5/10, 4/10, and 6/10.)
EP Daily	6.5/10
Eurogamer	4/10
Game Informer	7/10
GameRevolution	B−
GameSpot	4.5/10
GameSpy	5.5/10
IGN	4.7/10
Next Generation	3/5

Sonic Shuffle received "mixed or average" reviews, according to the review aggregation website Metacritic.

Critics were quick to identify the game as an inferior clone of Mario Party. They found the minigames to be overly complex, poorly explained, and generally not as enjoyable as those in Nintendo's flagship party series. Both GameSpot and Eurogamer felt as though the minigames were an afterthought, only appearing sparingly whereas in Mario Party they were central to the experience. GameSpot noted that it was possible to play through an entire game without ever playing a minigame, and felt that they were "a test of who can decipher the needlessly bewildering gameplay first". IGN complained about needing to land on certain tiles to play the minigames. Official Dreamcast Magazine (UK) argued that the minigames interfered with the main board game. PlanetDreamcast felt that they were inconsistent in quality, and wished there had been an option to turn them off. The long load times when transitioning between the main game board, the minigames, and other scenes was another common complaint. GameSpot wrote: "The combination of the unbearable load times, the smattering of minigames, and the poor minigame design make Sonic Shuffle a boring diversion at best." Eurogamer felt that Samba de Amigo (1999) was a better party game. Greg Orlando of NextGen concluded his review of the game by saying: "In the end, this shuffle is a decent one, and the hand that's dealt from it can hardly be considered a throwaway." Dr. Zombie of GamePro said that the game "can be tedious in one-player mode, but it's clearly intended for multiplayer fun. Although it's the only party game for Dreamcasters, Sonic Shuffle deals a great hand for all to play." (Note: GamePro gave the game two 4.5/5 scores for graphics and sound, 5/5 for control, and 4/5 for fun factor.)

Most reviewers praised the colorful and cartoon styling of the cel shaded graphics. GameRevolution praised the environment textures and felt the graphics were of the same high quality as Jet Set Radio. However, the graphics were not enough to convince critics. Eurogamer wrote that the visuals and audio were "deceptively good", hiding the bad gameplay underneath. Edge appreciated the visuals, but wrote that "ultimately, the game is dull. Under the dark shadow of Sonic Adventure 2, this tepid, diluted affair will have difficulty proving itself, even to franchise stalwarts". (Note: Edge gave the game four out of ten.) Official Dreamcast Magazine (UK) and its American counterpart both felt that the game was more fun with human players rather than computer-controlled opponents, and complained about the lack of online support. GameRevolution agreed, finding it boring waiting for computer players in single-player mode. Official Dreamcast Magazine (US) felt that with more development time and support from Sonic Team, the game could have been saved.
