= LBX: Little Battlers eXperience =

2012 video game

- Developer(s): Level-5; Climax Entertainment
- Publisher(s): Level-5 (Japan); Nintendo (America and Europe)
- Series: Little Battlers Experience
- Platform(s): Nintendo 3DS
- Release: JP: July 5, 2012; NA: August 21, 2015; EU: September 4, 2015; AU: September 5, 2015
- Genre(s): Action role-playing game
- Mode(s): Single-player, multiplayer

LBX: Little Battlers eXperience is an action role-playing video game developed and published by Level-5, and published by Nintendo in Europe and North America. It released for Nintendo 3DS in Japan on July 5, 2012, and in North America on August 21, 2015, Europe on September 4, 2015, and Australia on September 5, 2015. It is the third game in the Little Battlers Experience franchise, and the only one to be officially released in English.

Its story revolves around Van Yamano, a young boy who receives a miniature fighting robot known as an LBX. An evil organization known as the New Dawn Raiders attempt to obtain the robot for evil purposes due to the technology within it.

== Gameplay ==
The main character navigates the overworld and gets into third-person action battles in a miniature robot fighting arena. Most battles are either one-on-one or with up to three LBX on each side. Outside of battle, the player can customize their LBX using various different parts.

== Reception ==
Reception

Aggregate score
Aggregator	Score
Metacritic	73/100

Review scores
Publication	Score
Nintendo Life	7/10
Nintendo World Report	7/10
RPGamer	3/5

The game received an aggregate score of 73/100 on Metacritic, indicating "mixed or average" reviews.

Donald Thierault of Nintendo World Report rated the game 7/10 points, saying that it stuck closely to a Pokémon-style formula of being simple on the surface but having a great amount of postgame depth. Alex Olney of Nintendo Life also rated the game 7/10 stars, calling the game's core "incredibly intricate and precise" despite being outwardly aimed at children with its colorful aesthetic. He also called the plot beyond what he expected both with its writing and voice acting, albeit saying that it was "not exactly War and Peace". While praising the multiplayer, he called the omission of an online multiplayer mode "a huge downer", saying that it would have been perfect for the game. Alex Fuller of RPGamer rated the game 3/5 points, calling its story weak and "unbelievable", and said that despite the game being "generally fun", it had "missed potential".
