= Time Stalkers =

1999 video game

- North American Dreamcast cover art
- Developer: Climax Entertainment
- Publisher: Sega
- Platform: Dreamcast
- Release: JP: September 15, 1999; NA: March 28, 2000; EU: November 10, 2000
- Genres: Roguelike, role-playing
- Mode: Single-player

Time Stalkers, also known as Climax Landers (Note: Japanese: クライマックス ランダーズ, Hepburn: Kuraimakkusu Randāzu) in Japan, is a role-playing video game for the Dreamcast featuring appearances of worlds (and playable characters) from several of Climax Entertainment's earlier games in crossover fashion. The player initially takes the role of Sword, a character caught in a world made of many worlds. As he goes along, similar heroes show up for the player to control. The player may do things such as enter dungeons, take special assignments, and upgrade/buy/sell items.

== Gameplay ==
Time Stalkers is a role-playing video game with party members consisting of Climax characters as well as in-game enemies that can be collected and trained. The battle system combines RTS and turned based out of phase situational combat. The enemies appear on screen and transition to individual arrangements for RTS style combat. The game takes roughly 45 hours to complete and features multiple endings.

== Plot ==
While going to investigate a clock tower that is said to be the source of a curse, Sword is attacked by an armored figure. He manages to fight it off, and it flees into the clock tower. Sword gives chase, and while searching for the armored figure, finds a strange book. When he opens it, a bright light flashes, and Sword loses consciousness. When he awakens, he finds the Clock Tower has changed, and after exiting, he finds himself in a world that seems to be made up of various disparate locations mashed together.

He meets an old man who simply says to call him "Master." He tells Sword that the world is threatened by a terrible darkness, and he must protect it. As Sword tries to figure out a way out of the world, the world expands, with more and more pieces added to it, such as a prehistoric mountain, old ruins, a modern-day city, and many more. Sword also meets and teams up with other heroes, such as Nigel from Landstalker. And Lady from Ladystalker.

They eventually discover that "Master" is the one responsible for the creation of the world, and is basically using all the people he has brought into the world as characters in a living story of his own creation. Sword furiously refuses to play any longer, even going so far as to distract Master from watching his precious story unfold. Master retaliates by punishing everyone with unending hunger and thirst.

Sword finally challenges Master to a showdown, with the stakes that if they lose, they'll remain in Master's story, but if they win, Master lets them go. Master accepts the challenge and creates a final dungeon for their showdown. Sword and his party are victorious, and Master reveals the book that is the source of the world. Sword (or one of the other heroes) closes the book, and all the people of the different worlds who had begun to intermingle with each other return to their respective homes, which are then returned to their worlds.

The ending that follows varies depending on which hero is used to close the book.

== Reception ==
Reception

Aggregate score
Aggregator	Score
GameRankings	52%

Review scores
Publication	Score
AllGame	2.5/5
CNET Gamecenter	4/10
Electronic Gaming Monthly	3.67/10 (Note: Three critics of Electronic Gaming Monthly gave the game each a score of 3.5/10, 3/10, and 4.5/10.)
Famitsu	27/40
Game Informer	6.5/10
GameFan	68%
GameRevolution	C
GameSpot	5.2/10
GameSpy	4.5/10
IGN	6.5/10
Next Generation	3/5
RPGamer	7/10
RPGFan	63/100

Time Stalkers received mixed reviews according to the review aggregation website GameRankings. Pete Bartholow of GameSpot gave the Japanese import a mixed review, criticizing its "traditional" story, randomized dungeon layouts, ugly graphics, and most particularly the resetting of experience points at the beginning of each dungeon. He concluded by advising gamers to instead get the "vastly superior" Evolution: The World of Sacred Device (the Dreamcast's only other RPG at that time). Anoop Gantayat of IGN praised the unique overworld and the monster capture mechanic. However, like GameSpot, he took issue with the resetting of experience points and also complained of the game's concise dialogue and short length. PlanetDreamcast gave it a negative review, over a month and a half before its U.S. release date. Jeff Lundrigan of NextGen said of the game, "It ain't bad, but the Dreamcast RPG audience needs more than this generic fix." In Japan, Famitsu gave it a score of 27 out of 40. GamePro summed up the review of the game by saying, "RPG aficionados looking for that great adventure for the Dreamcast will have to wait—Time Stalkers isn't it. While it'll probably satisfy dungeon crawlers, it will barely get a real adventurer's attention." (Note: GamePro gave the game two 4.5/5 scores for graphics and control, and two 3/5 scores for sound and fun factor.)
