= Little Battlers Experience =

2011 video game series and franchise

- Cover of the first DVD anime
- Genres: Action role-playing Gacha game
- Developers: Level-5; DMM Games
- Publisher: Level-5
- Platforms: PlayStation Portable; Nintendo 3DS; PlayStation Vita; PC; Android iOS
- Original release: List: Little Battlers Experience; JP: June 16, 2011; Little Battlers Experience Boost; JP: November 23, 2011; LBX: Little Battlers eXperience; JP: July 5, 2012; NA: August 21, 2015; EU: September 4, 2015; AU: September 5, 2015; Little Battlers eXperience W; JP: October 18, 2012; Little Battlers eXperience W Super Custom; JP: June 27, 2013; Little Battlers eXperience Wars; JP: October 31, 2013; LBX Girls 2017
- First release: Little Battlers Experience: JP: June 16, 2011; (Note: The game's release was preceded by the manga and anime series of the same name, which debuted in January 2011.)
- Latest release: LBX Girls; 2017

Little Battlers Experience, also known as Danball Senki (Japanese: ダンボール戦機, Hepburn: Danbōru Senki; lit. "Cardboard War-Machines"), or simply LBX, is a series of action role-playing video games created by Level-5, involving small plastic model robots known as LBXs (standing for "Little Battler eXperience") that fight on dioramas made out of cardboard, with the main character setting out to battle against LBXs created by other characters. The first game of the series was released on June 16, 2011, for the PlayStation Portable and has expanded to six official games and three Japanese anime series. Nintendo published the first game for Nintendo 3DS in North America on August 21, 2015, Europe on September 4, 2015, and Australia on September 5, 2015.

== Plot ==
AD 2046, technology has grown all over the world and innovation is leading the way. The way of delivery methods has changed since the creation of fortified cardboard, which can resist every impact and keep its contents intact. As the popularity of the material grew, so did its purposes. The super strong cardboard was used as material for special battlefields for LBXs, specialized miniature robots made by Tiny Orbit that were once banned due to their destructive purposes. Their popularity has again risen due to the specialized battlefield, and special models of LBX were made.

Four years after the creation of these fortified cardboard, in AD 2050, Van Yamano, a male middle school student, was entrusted with the LBX "AX-00" by a mysterious woman, containing a Platinum Capsule. Van learned from the woman that his father was still alive and knew about a secret conspiracy in the government. Van himself must protect the LBX and the Platinum Capsule, as its contents could change the world forever.

=== LBXs and Fortified Cardboard ===
LBX, which stands for "Little Battlers eXperience", are a line of commercially released robot models and was the primary focus of the series. Originally made in the 2040s by Tiny Orbit, the largest toy maker in the world, LBXs were initially discontinued for being deemed too dangerous and powerful to be used for entertainment purposes as a result of their unchecked destructive capabilities. It wasn't until the introduction of the highly resilient "fortified cardboard" (強化ダンボール, kyōka danbōru) in 2042 that the highly dangerous toyline saw a massive resurgence in popularity and has since become both a popular hobby amongst collectors, as well as a massively competitive sport around the world.

Roughly the size of an average human hand, an LBX is highly customizable, allowing anyone to change its three core components: the Core Skeleton (コアスケルトン, Koa Sukeruton), from which all other parts connect; its Armor Frames (アーマーフレーム, Aamaa Fureimu) that acts both as enhanced armor for the Core Skeleton and provides the model's finalized appearance; and the Core Box (コアボックス, Koa Bokkusu), which houses the robot's external components necessary for the robot to function, such as memory units, battery, external motor(s) and other miscellaneous parts.

Typically controlled using cellphone-like devices called a Control & Communication Manipulator (制御・通信マニピュレータ, Seigyo tsūshin Manipyurēta; otherwise called CCM, and also known as eXtroller in the English dub), LBX usually battles against other player's LBXs in special Diorama (ジオラマ, Jiorama) battlefields made from fortified cardboard in controlled regulations set by the combatants. Players can also command their LBX to execute Attack Functions (必殺ファンクション, Hissatsu Fankushonn; also known as Special Attack Routine in the English dub), powerful special attacks that can be learned once the LBX's in-system Chance Gauge (Cゲージ, C Gēji) reaches at least 100%, with certain LBX models has access to alternative Special Modes (特殊モード, Supesharu Mōdo) and set-exclusive Attack Functions (固有必殺ファンクション, Koyuu Hissatsu Fankushon; also known as EX Special Attack Routine in the English dub) powerful enough to cause a Final Break (ファイナルブレイク, Fainaru Bureiku; also known as Breaking Blow in the English dub) on an LBX and destroy it beyond repair.

== Characters ==
=== Main characters ===
Van Yamano (山野バン, Yamano Ban)
Voiced by: Megumi Kubota (Japanese); Cole Howard (English)
A 13-year-old boy and the main protagonist of the series. Van is a young boy who is very obsessed with LBX Toys and has always wanted to collect them. His father was the inventor responsible for creating the LBX Toys, but since he has been missing from the airplane, Van's mother refused to have LBX Toys until the Mysterious Woman gave him an LBX, known as Achilles, saying the fate of the world rested on this LBX. Van later learns that his father is still somewhere, that the airplane accident was a fake, and was captured by an evil organization known as Innovators (イノベーター, Inobētās; also known as New Dawn Raisers in the English dub). Van continues to search for his father and fight with his rivals to defeat the evil man responsible for kidnapping his father.
Amy Cohen (川村アミ, Kawamura Ami)
Voiced by: Marina Inoue (Japanese); Shannon Chan-Kent (English)
A 13-year-old girl and a classmate of Van. Bright and studious, she's a real walking encyclopedia on LBX! She gets LBX Pandora by solving its mystery.
Kaz Walker (青島カズヤ, Aoshima Kazuya)
Voiced by: Daisuke Namikawa (Japanese); Brett Bauer (English)
Van and Ami's best friend. He's a little cynic and unsure, but he's always there to help his friends with his LBX skills, strategy and cunning. He is an expert in long-range shooting.
Hanz Gordon (郷田ハンゾウ, Gouda Hanzou)
Voiced by: Yūki Hayashi (Japanese); Adrian Petriw (English)
Hanz stole Achilles's armor frame by using a fake cash card. He was first defeated by Van. In the second season, he joins Van's gang in order to fight the Directors.
Justin Kaido (海道ジン, Kaidou Jin)
Voiced by: Hisafumi Oda (Japanese); Matthew Erickson (English)
A mysterious, emotionless, and somewhat of a loner, Justin Kaido is practically the anti-Van. He is Yoshimitsu Kaido's Grandson. A new student at school, he spends all of his time battling with his LBX named Emperor. His skills are so advanced that Justin earned himself the nickname "Sudden Death Emperor" because it has never taken him more than 10 seconds to beat an opponent. In fact, the only time Justin has ever lost was when he battled Van. Afterwards he becomes Ban's friend and joins his team.
Nils Richter (灰原ユウヤ, Haibara Yuuya)
Voiced by: Yūki Kaji (Japanese); Brian Doe (English)
He is an LBX player who first shows himself in 2050 Artemis. He is being controlled by Innovator. Jin makes him normal. Afterwards in LBX W, he joins Ban.
Dak Sendō (仙道ダイキ, Sendou Daiki)
Voiced by: Anri Katsu (Japanese); Alistair Abell (English)
He is the second one who defeated Gouda. He is known as the "Magician in the Box".
Hiro Hughes (大空ヒロ, Oozora Hiro)
Voiced by: Hiro Shimono (Japanese); Alex Day (English)
A boy with sharp reflexes and a natural talent with LBXs. The second protagonist of Danball Senki W. Loves video games and an old superhero TV show called "Galactic Hero Senshiman". When his concentration reaches a certain threshold, usually when pushed to his limits, he becomes attentive and able to respond faster than usual, sometimes being able to predict the future when his stress was heightened enough.
Laura Hanasaki (花咲ラン, Hanasaki Ran)
Voiced by: Kana Hanazawa (Japanese); Kazumi Evans (English)
A feisty girl with good combat skills. Ran lives with her grandpa in her family's dojo, and is the inheritor of the Hanasaki style. She gets chosen to fight with Ban and Hiro against Detector by winning Minerva in a karate tournament.
Jessica Kaios (ジェシカ・カイオス, Jeshika Kaiosu)
Voiced by: Eri Kitamura (Japanese); Maggie Blue O'Hara (English)
She is the daughter of Owen Kaios.
Asuka Carter (古城アスカ, Kojou Asuka)
Voiced by: Ryoko Shiraishi (Japanese); Chiara Zanni (English)
The 14-year-old champion of the 2051 Artemis LBX world tournament with the nickname "Super Rookie". Her LBX Vampire Cat was handmade by her little brother, Takeru. She has a habit of getting in other peoples' business, and loves tomato juice. Everyone, including Hiro thought she was a boy until she commented after winning.

== Development ==
Development of the franchise began in 2008 alongside the game which is once titled "LEVEL5 VISION 2008". In December 2009, Level-5 announced that the anime/manga series is under production to accompany the release of their latest PlayStation Portable game, with Bandai releasing a series of plastic models featuring the mecha from the game. Although initially set for release in 2010, the anime is delayed a year later and aired on March 2, 2011, while the game is released on June 16, 2011.

== Media ==
=== Anime ===
The first series, based on the first game, is produced by Oriental Light and Magic under the direction of Naohito Takahashi and began airing on TV Tokyo from March 2, 2011, to January 11, 2012, with a total of 44 Episodes. The sequel series, Little Battlers eXperience W (ダンボール戦機W, Danbōru Senki W; lit. 'Cardboard war-machines double') was announced in late December, and aired between January 18, 2012, and March 20, 2013, with a total of 58 episodes. A third series titled Little Battlers eXperience Wars (ダンボール戦機WARS, Danbōru Senki Wōzu; lit. 'Cardboard war-machine wars') aired on TV Tokyo on April 3, 2013, to coincide with the third game's release. Wars would be the final season for the anime series and ended on December 25, 2013, with a total of 37 episodes.

Dentsu Entertainment USA confirmed that they have licensed the anime in the U.S., and began airing on Nicktoons from August 24, 2014. After the dub was aired in its entirety, it was revealed the series was abridged from 44 episodes to 26 episodes. Episodes with what was considered questionable content were merged with other episodes or in some cases skipped altogether. Because of the large difference in content, the list of dubbed episodes are listed under a new section called LBX: Little Battlers eXperience.

An adaptation of the sequel series, Little Battlers eXperience W, aired as the second season of LBX, premiering October 18, 2015, on Nicktoons.

During AnimeJapan 2019, LBX Girls (Sōkō Musume Senki) was announced by DMM Pictures as a new spinoff of the Little Battlers eXperience series and part of the Sōkō Musume multimedia project. The series aired from January 7 to March 25, 2021. Rikako Aida performs the series' opening theme "Dream Hopper", while Kano performs the series' ending theme "Compass Song". Funimation licensed the series and streamed it on its website in North America and the British Isles, in Europe through Wakanim, and in Australia and New Zealand through AnimeLab. An English dub of the series was released on January 19, 2022.

=== Movie ===
A movie adaptation was announced in the July issue of CoroCoro Comic titled Inazuma Eleven GO vs. Danbōru Senki W, which premiered in theaters on December 1, 2012.

=== Manga ===
A manga adaptation was serialized in Shogakukan's CoroCoro Comic from February 2011 to March 2013. It lasted for six volumes. In the US, it is distributed by Viz Media. Another manga adaptation, entitled Danball Senki Kaidō Jin Gaiden (ダンボール戦機 海道ジン外伝), was written and illustrated by Hiroyuki Takei under the pen name Hiro was published in CoroCoro G. There is also a manga adaptation of Danball Senki Wars which is also serialized in CoroCoro Comic.

=== Music ===
The background music for the English version was composed by David Iris, John Mitchell and Tom Keenlyside. Michael and Andrew Twining wrote the closing theme songs "Battle On" (season 1) and "Save the World" (season 2).

The music for the anime was composed by Rei Kondoh, who also composed the soundtracks for the video games Ōkami and Sengoku Basara 3, among others.

The first anime series has four official theme songs. The first opening is titled "1 Dream" (1ドリーム, 1 Dorīmu) and the second opening is titled "Telepathy" (以心伝心, Ishindenshin), both performed by Little Blue boX. The first ending song is titled "My Savings Bank" (僕の貯金箱, Boku no chokin-bako) and the second ending is titled "Secret Base" (ヒミツキチ, Himitsukichi), both performed by Hiroki Maekawa.

Little Battlers eXperience W has eight official theme songs. The first being "Brave Hero", the second opening theme is "Three as One" (三位一体, Sanmi Ittai), the third opening theme is "2 Spirits" (2スピリッ, 2 Supiritsu), and the fourth opening song "Telepathy", all performed by Little Blue boX. The first ending song is "Do Wak Parappa" (Do Wak パラッパ, Do Wak Parappa), the second ending is "Close your Eyes..." (目を閉じて…, Me o Tojite...), and the third ending is "Even if born again, it's good to be me" (生まれ変わっても僕でいいよ, Umarekawatte mo boku de ī yo), all performed by Hiroki Maekawa. The fourth ending theme is "Bonds of Earth" (地球の絆, Chikyu no Kizuna), performed by Dream5.

Little Battlers eXperience Wars has five official theme songs. The first opening is titled "Mugen Myself" and the second opening is titled "Eternal", both performed by Little Blue boX. The first ending song is "Kamisama Yāyāyā" performed by Dream5. The second ending song is "Bokutachi no Wars" performed by Ryota Ohsaka, Sayori Ishizuka, and Tomoaki Maeno. The third ending song is "Hirameki" performed by Ryota Ohsaka.

== See also ==
- Accel World
- Alice Gear Aegis
- Arcanadea
- Busou Shinki
- Frame Arms Girl
- Gundam Build Divers
- Gundam Build Fighters
- Hundred
- Infinite Stratos
- Model Suit Gunpla Builders Beginning G
- Plamo-Kyoshiro
- Symphogear
