= Runabout (series) =

Runabout is a series of destruction-themed driving video games developed by Climax Entertainment. Games in this series have been released on PlayStation, PlayStation 2, Dreamcast and Nintendo 3DS. Runabout's main missions consist of the player driving from point A to point B in order to pick up or deliver an item. The first game had more than one map to choose from, whereas the later ones utilized one city map modeled after an actual location—San Francisco in Super Runabout (Dreamcast) and New York in Runabout 3 Neo Age (PlayStation 2). Players start off with just a few vehicles. When players complete a mission, destroy as much as they can, or drive without damaging anything, they are rewarded with a new vehicle. In the newer games, players are also rewarded with paint jobs and special abilities for each individual vehicle.

Although made in Japan, all games in the series feature mostly English text and dialogue regardless of the region. Vehicles across all games include a pickup truck, NSR (Honda NSX), F1 car, tank, and various novelty vehicles such as the RCC (radio-controlled car).

== Key features and gameplay ==
- Missions: The main missions involve driving to specific locations to pick up or deliver items. The first game offered multiple maps, while later games focused on a single city map modeled after real locations, such as San Francisco in Super Runabout (Dreamcast) and New York in Runabout 3 Neo Age (PlayStation 2).
- Vehicles: Players start with a limited selection of vehicles. Completing missions, causing destruction, or driving without damage unlocks new vehicles. The series features a variety of vehicles, including a pickup truck, NSR (Honda NSX), F1 car, tank, and novelty vehicles like a radio-controlled car.
- Rewards: In newer games, players can also earn paint jobs and special abilities for their vehicles.

== Development and localization ==
- Japanese origins: Despite being developed in Japan, the games feature predominantly English text and dialogue, making them accessible to a global audience.
- Graphics and mechanics: Over the years, the series has seen improvements in graphics and gameplay mechanics. For example, Runabout 3 Neo Age on PlayStation 2 introduced better reflections, character animations, and higher polygon counts for vehicles and objects.

== Games ==
=== Felony 11-79 (Runabout) ===
Felony 11-79 / Runabout
- Developer: Climax Entertainment
- Publishers: JP: Yanoman; WW: ASCII Entertainment
- Platform: PlayStation
- Release: JP: May 29, 1997; NA: September 11, 1997; EU: December 1997
- Genre: Racing
- Mode: Single-player

=== Runabout 2 ===
Runabout 2
- Developer: Climax Entertainment
- Publishers: JP: Climax; NA: Hot-B USA; EU: Midas Interactive Entertainment
- Director: Yoshiaki Takaoka
- Designer: Yoshiaki Takaoka
- Platform: PlayStation
- Release: JP: November 18, 1999; NA: May 19, 2000; EU: February 2, 2003
- Genre: Racing
- Mode: Single-player

=== Super Runabout: San Francisco Edition ===
Super Runabout: San Francisco Edition
- Developer: Climax Entertainment
- Publishers: JP: Climax Entertainment; NA: Interplay Entertainment; EU: Virgin Interactive
- Platform: Dreamcast
- Release: Super Runabout: JP: May 25, 2000; San Francisco Edition: NA: October 24, 2000; EU: November 24, 2000; JP: June 21, 2001
- Genre: Racing
- Mode: Single-player

=== Runabout 3: Neo Age ===
Runabout 3: Neo Age
- Developer: Climax Entertainment
- Publishers: JP: Hearty Robin; EU: BAM! Entertainment
- Platform: PlayStation 2
- Release: JP: May 23, 2002; EU: August 14, 2003
- Genre: Racing
- Mode: Single-player

Released only in Japan and Europe, this third follow-up for the PlayStation 2 offers just one city, New York. The graphics were improved over those of the previous game. Alterations included improved reflections and character animations, and generally higher polygon counts on the game's vehicle, as well as character and object models. The game featured sections where the player was required to drift crash to get "Drift Crash Points". There were also vehicle-jumping distance and speed records.

Extras

The options menu featured two unlockable sections, one of which was an "Object List" in which every crashable object in the game was displayed. The names were written in colors to reflect their scarcity (items marked with gold being common, and those marked with green being special mission objects). Also in the options menu was the "Bonus Tip" list, where one could keep track of what bonuses were received as well as the criteria for obtaining bonuses not yet revealed. The bonuses ranged from unlockable vehicles to extra paint jobs or special actions for the vehicles.

Reception

On release, Famitsu magazine scored the game a 31 out of 40.

=== Runabout 3D: Drive Impossible ===
Runabout 3D: Drive Impossible was released for the Nintendo 3DS in Japan on January 19, 2012. It was developed by Rocket Company. The game was released as Crash City Mayhem in Europe by British publisher Ghostlight and in North America by American publisher Majesco.

== Music in Runabout ==
Felony 11–79 (or Runabout in Japan), Super Runabout and Runabout 3 Neo Age all feature soundtracks performed by Japanese surf band Surf Coasters, who are known for their Dick Dale-esque sound.
