= Dark Savior =

1996 video game

- North American box art
- Developer: Climax Entertainment
- Publishers: JP: Climax Entertainment; NA/PAL: Sega
- Director: Kōji Sugimori
- Composer: Hiroshi Kondo
- Platform: Sega Saturn
- Release: JP: August 30, 1996; NA: December 12, 1996; PAL: February 20, 1997
- Genres: Adventure, fighting, platform, puzzle
- Mode: Single-player

Dark Savior (Note: Japanese: ダークセイバー, Hepburn: Dāku Seibā) is a 3D mixed-genre video game developed and published by Climax Entertainment for the Sega Saturn. It was referred to by GameSpot as a sequel to the Sega Genesis game Landstalker: The Treasures of King Nole.

== Gameplay ==
Dark Savior is a combination of three different gameplay genres: platform, puzzle-adventure, and fighting. Aside from one or two sections which blend platform and puzzle elements, these three gameplay types are kept distinct and separate. The fighting sections actually run in an entirely different gameplay mode; unlike the rest of the game, which features full 3D movement, these sections use 3D graphics but are played entirely in two dimensions.

During some matches in the fighting mode, the player character can capture his opponent, allowing the player to control that opponent in future matches. The player cannot capture an opponent when using a previously captured character.

The platforming sections require the player to utilize the camera control in order to see around certain objects, and supports the Saturn analog gamepad. Though control is purely digital, the player can use the analog controller to simultaneously control their character (using the D-pad) and the camera (using the analog thumb pad).

Instead of currency, the player can find items (cigarettes, alcohol, and magazines in the original Japanese release, replaced by chocolate bars, empty bottles, and magazines in all other regions) which can be traded for information, items, or points. Points can in turn be used to revive the player character if he dies, increase the player character's hit points, or avoid fights.

== Plot ==
The player character, Garian, is a bounty hunter tasked with escorting a dangerous monster named Bilan to a prison island where it will be interned. During the voyage to the prison, Bilan escapes and Garian races to capture the monster before it reaches the captain's cabin. The time taken by Garian to reach the cabin determines the course of the game.

Parallel I: The Hunt for Evil

Should the player take more than four minutes to reach the captain's cabin, Bilan will kill the captain, escape and head towards the prison. Something of a disaster scenario, this parallel sees Garian pursuing Bilan who leaves a trail of carnage in his wake. After destroying Bilan at the parallel's conclusion, Garian ponders how things might have turned out differently.

Parallel II: A Hunt for the Heart

Reaching the cabin between three and four minutes, Garian finds Bilan threatening the captain. After defeating the monster, it goes through a surprising transformation. With Bilan no longer a threat, the game's plot comes to focus on the conflict between an organization of rebellious prisoners, the corrupt warden Kurtliegen, and a ninja woman, Kay. The longest scenario; it runs roughly twice as long as Parallels III, IV, and V combined.

Parallel III: A Hunt for the Lies

Accessed by reaching the captain within three minutes. Garian gets to the cabin before Bilan and locks the creature out. Bilan again makes its way to the island and Garian pursues it. While quite similar to the first scenario, Parallel 3 is not quite as bleak. It does, however, make a major divergence at its conclusion, where Garian makes a startling discovery.

Parallel IV: A Hunt for the Truth.

Parallel 4 begins when Parallel 3 ends. This scenario has a stronger science fiction element to it, as it revolves around the conflict between parallel universes. Conflicting realities cause the island to become unstable, and leave Garian in poor condition. In this scenario, Garian must rescue his friends to affirm his existence, escape the island and confront the source of the chaos, though he must do it within a time limit and without the aid of save points. This is also the only scenario where the source of the game's name, Dark Savior, becomes apparent.

Parallel V: Marathon of Death

This scenario splits off from II. If the player encounters Bilan at the captain's cabin, but is defeated by him, then Parallel 5 begins. Garian is put through a sort of purgatory, where he must fight through a tournament, the competitors consisting of his allies and enemies from the other scenarios. Unlike the other parallels, this one has no quest components, only battles. Completing this parallel once and re-entering it unlocks a two-player mode (the second player can take control of Garian's opponents).

== Development ==
Work on Dark Savior started in December 1994. Though the characters were all represented with 2-dimensional bitmaps, they were placed within a 3-dimensional environment built of texture mapped polygons. The game took what was then considered an unusually long time in development because none of the Climax team had any experience with 3D camera programming, polygonal modeling, or the Sega Saturn. Programming the adjustable camera alone took six months, and getting the game to run at a decent speed proved difficult. Despite this, director Kan Naito felt that the decision to create the game for the Saturn rather than the PlayStation proved to be the right one: "The PlayStation may be better at managing polygons, but you can't write in assembler, you can only use C and we just don't know if Dark Saviour could be done in C. The PlayStation's polygons become easily distorted, too - especially when big polygons come close to the camera."

Lacking the Silicon Graphics workstations employed by big developers, Climax had to program the game using a little-known 3D software package called Cyclone and their own custom software tools, apart from the two full motion video (FMV) sequences, which were designed in Softimage 3D by freelance artist Masayuki Hasegawa (who had previously designed the FMVs for Clockwork Knight). With the game's development already running past its original release date of May 1996, Climax employed freelance graphic designers, composers, and scenario writers in order to get the game done in a more timely manner.

== Reception ==
Reception

Review scores
Publication	Score
AllGame	3.5/5
Consoles +	92%
Computer and Video Games	4/5
Edge	7/10
Electronic Gaming Monthly	8.375/10
GameFan	91/100 (Note: GameFan's review was by three critics, two critics that gave it a 92/100 and one that scored it 88/100.)
GamesMaster	81%
GameSpot	6.7/10
Hyper	77%
Joystick	5/5
M! Games	68/100
Mean Machines Sega	90%
Video Games (DE)	84%
Sega Saturn Magazine	92%
Ultra Game Players	8/10

Dark Savior received generally positive reviews. Comments on the game varied widely, though the most common subject of praise was the large, graphically impressive polygonal environments. The fighting game segments were somewhat controversial; while Computer and Video Games, Ultra Game Players, Shawn Smith of Electronic Gaming Monthly, and Rich Leadbetter of Sega Saturn Magazine commented that the inclusion of a fighting game component is unique for an adventure game and works well, GamePro, Jeff Gerstmann of GameSpot, and Smith's co-reviewers Dan Hsu, Crispin Boyer, and Sushi-X all remarked that while the ability to fight with captured enemies is an interesting novelty, the actual fighting is rudimentary and lackluster, with each character having only two basic attacks and one special attack, and Mean Machines Sega felt that the restriction of battles to a separate gameplay mode makes the platforming mode "seem empty and lifeless."

GamePro found the game too easy in general and judged the story to be simplistic and overly linear, but concluded that the variety of gameplay styles make Dark Savior "a good buy for novices". The reviewer also said the multiple endings give the game high replay value. Gerstmann commented on its "monotonous" platforming sections and unique combat style, and concluded that while the game is good overall, gamers should rent it first to see how much they are bothered by its various shortcomings. Hsu called it "a refreshing alternative to the mainstream RPGs" and Sushi-X remarked that "the story is intriguing, with a mysterious enemy, and multiple plots that all converge slowly without giving away anything." Leadbetter also praised the story, and made particular note of the parallel system. He deemed Dark Savior "A brilliantly original and well-executed adventure that's without compare." Computer and Video Games called it a "stunning game" with a "really interesting" storyline and "great replay value". Mean Machines called it "the most lavish RPG on Saturn, with nothing to put off platform gamesplayers too. There's never a dull moment." Ultra Game Players deemed it a game which could "bridge the gap" for action-game players who are becoming interested in RPGs.
