= Climax Entertainment =

Video game studio based in Japan

- Native name: 株式会社クライマックス
- Romanized name: Kabushiki Gaisha Kuraimakkusu
- Type: Kabushiki gaisha
- Industry: Video games
- Founded: April 1990
- Defunct: 2014-2015
- Headquarters: Shinjuku-ku, Tokyo, Japan
- Key people: Kan Naito
- Products: Landstalker series

Climax Entertainment was a Japanese video game development company. It was a small company, with just 20 staff in 1996. Climax got its start during the 16-bit era, primarily developing games for the Sega Genesis console. During the 32-bit era, some members of the team left to create Matrix Software. Following the development of Dark Savior (1996), a group of staff members from the company's CGI division formed an independent company Climax Graphics, initially described as a "brother company".

By 2014 to 2015, without any official announcement, Climax was closed due to financial issues. Neratte! Tobashite! Rilakkuma GuraGura Sweets Tower on the Nintendo 3DS was the last game to be developed by Climax.

== Games ==
- Shining in the Darkness (Sega Genesis)
- Shining Force (with Sonic! Software Planning) (Sega Genesis)
- Landstalker (Sega Genesis)
- Lady Stalker (Super Famicom)
- Dark Savior (Sega Saturn)
- Felony 11-79 (PlayStation)
- Time Stalkers (Dreamcast)
- Runabout 2 (PlayStation)
- Virtua Athlete 2K (Dreamcast)
- Super Runabout: San Francisco Edition (Dreamcast)
- Runabout 3: Neo-Age (PlayStation 2)
- Kingdom of Paradise (PlayStation Portable)
- Tenchi no Mon 2: Busouden (PlayStation Portable)
- Ore no Dungeon (PlayStation Portable)
- Miburi & Teburi (Wii)
- Steal Princess (Nintendo DS)
- Dinosaur King (Nintendo DS)
- Hottarake no Shima: Kanata to Nijiiro no Kagami (Nintendo DS)
- Element Hunters (Nintendo DS)
- SD Gundam Sangokuden Brave Battle Warriors: Shin Mirisha Taisen (Nintendo DS)
- Crash City Mayhem (Nintendo 3DS)
- LBX: Little Battlers eXperience (Nintendo 3DS)
- Neratte! Tobashite! Rilakkuma GuraGura Sweets Tower (Nintendo 3DS)
